= List of 1949–50 NBA season transactions =

This is a list of all personnel changes for the 1949 NBA off-season and 1949–50 NBA season.

== Events ==
=== July 16, 1949 ===
- The Denver Nuggets signed Bob Brown as a free agent.
- The Denver Nuggets signed Kenny Sailors as a free agent.

=== July 26, 1949 ===
- The Indianapolis Olympians sold Leo Mogus to the Philadelphia Warriors.

=== August 1949 ===
- The Boston Celtics selected Chick Halbert from the Providence Steam Rollers in the dispersal draft.
- The Boston Celtics selected Les Pugh from the Providence Steam Rollers in the dispersal draft.
- The Boston Celtics selected Howie Shannon from the Providence Steam Rollers in the dispersal draft.
- The Boston Celtics selected Brady Walker from the Providence Steam Rollers in the dispersal draft.
- The Boston Celtics selected Ernie Calverley from the Providence Steam Rollers in the dispersal draft. Boston agreed to play 10 home games in Providence.

=== August 3, 1949 ===
- The Tri-Cities Blackhawks hired Roger Potter as head coach.
- The Syracuse Nationals hired Al Cervi as head coach.
- The Sheboygan Red Skins hired Ken Suesens as head coach.
- The Waterloo Hawks hired Charley Shipp as head coach.

=== August 13, 1949 ===
- The Indianapolis Olympians sold John Mandic to the Washington Capitols.

=== September 3, 1949 ===
- The Syracuse Nationals signed Andrew Levane as a free agent.

=== September 28, 1949 ===
- The Washington Capitols traded Sonny Hertzberg to the Boston Celtics for Chick Halbert.
- The Baltimore Bullets sold Chick Reiser to the Washington Capitols.

=== October 4, 1949 ===
- The Washington Capitols traded Kleggie Hermsen to the Chicago Stags for Chuck Gilmur.

=== October 11, 1949 ===
- The Indianapolis Olympians signed Bruce Hale as a free agent.

=== October 18, 1949 ===
- The Boston Celtics waived Les Pugh.

=== November ?, 1949 ===
- The Baltimore Bullets signed Les Pugh as a free agent.
- The Denver Nuggets signed Dillard Crocker as a free agent.

=== November 2, 1949 ===
- The Fort Wayne Pistons sold Jack Smiley to the Anderson Packers.
- The Fort Wayne Pistons waived Dillard Crocker.

=== November 9, 1949 ===
- The Tri-Cities Blackhawks traded Jack Kerris to the Fort Wayne Pistons for John Mahnken.

=== November 23, 1949 ===
- The Rochester Royals sold Mike Novak to the Philadelphia Warriors.

=== November 28, 1949 ===
- The St. Louis Bombers traded Mike Todorovich to the Tri-Cities Blackhawks for Mac Otten and cash.

=== December ?, 1949 ===
- The Denver Nuggets released Ed Bartels.

=== December 3, 1949 ===
- The Fort Wayne Pistons sold Dick Triptow to the Baltimore Bullets.

=== December 5, 1949 ===
- The Waterloo Hawks signed Hoot Gibson as a free agent.

=== December 6, 1949 ===
- The New York Knicks signed Ed Bartels as a free agent.
- The Washington Capitols sold Dick Schulz to the Tri-Cities Blackhawks.

=== December 7, 1949 ===
- The Philadelphia Warriors traded Ed Sadowski and cash to the Baltimore Bullets for Ron Livingstone.
- The Tri-Cities Blackhawks sold Billy Hassett to the Minneapolis Lakers.

=== December 8, 1949 ===
- The New York Knicks sold Lee Knorek to the Baltimore Bullets.

=== December 12, 1949 ===
- The Chicago Stags sold Ed Mikan to the Rochester Royals.

=== December 13, 1949 ===
- The Baltimore Bullets released Dick Triptow.

=== December 15, 1949 ===
- The Indianapolis Olympians sold Floyd Volker to the Denver Nuggets.
- The Boston Celtics sold George Nostrand to the Tri-Cities Blackhawks.

=== December 20, 1949 ===
- The Tri-Cities Blackhawks traded George Nostrand to the Chicago Stags for Gene Vance.

=== December 21, 1949 ===
- The Minneapolis Lakers sold Paul Walther to the Indianapolis Olympians.

=== December 29, 1949 ===
- The Philadelphia Warriors signed Freddie Lewis as a free agent.

=== December 30, 1949 ===
- The Anderson Packers traded Walt Kirk to the Tri-Cities Blackhawks for Red Owens.

=== ? ===
- The Tri-Cities Blackhawks sold Bob Cousy to the Chicago Stags.

=== January 5, 1950 ===
- The Washington Capitols released John Mandic.
- The Baltimore Bullets signed John Mandic as a free agent.

=== January 12, 1950 ===
- The Waterloo Hawks released Stan Patrick.

=== January 13, 1950 ===
- The Tri-Cities Blackhawks sold Whitey Von Nieda to the Baltimore Bullets.

=== January 18, 1950 ===
- The Anderson Packers traded Ralph Johnson and Howie Schultz to the Fort Wayne Pistons for Charlie Black and Richie Niemiera.

=== January 29, 1950 ===
- The Tri-Cities Blackhawks traded John Mahnken to the Boston Celtics for Gene Englund.
- The Boston Celtics waived Dermie O'Connell.

=== February 1, 1950 ===
- The Boston Celtics sold Dermie O'Connell to the St. Louis Bombers.

=== February 5, 1950 ===
- The Sheboygan Red Skins signed Stan Patrick as a free agent.

=== February 6, 1950 ===
- The Denver Nuggets sold Duane Klueh to the Fort Wayne Pistons.

=== February 7, 1950 ===
- The Fort Wayne Pistons sold Bill Henry to the Tri-Cities Blackhawks.

=== February 9, 1950 ===
- The Waterloo Hawks signed Johnny Orr as a free agent.

=== February 10, 1950 ===
- The Tri-Cities Blackhawks traded Don Otten to the Washington Capitols for Jack Nichols.

=== March 10, 1950 ===
- The Washington Capitols hired Bones McKinney as head coach.

=== March 22, 1950 ===
- Alvin Julian resigns as head coach for Boston Celtics.

=== April 16, 1950 ===
- The Sheboygan Red Skins sold Noble Jorgensen to the Tri-Cities Blackhawks.

=== April 25, 1950 ===
- The Chicago Stags selected Frankie Brian from the Anderson Packers in the dispersal draft.
- The Philadelphia Warriors selected Bill Closs from the Anderson Packers in the dispersal draft.
- The Philadelphia Warriors selected Milo Komenich from the Anderson Packers in the dispersal draft.
- The Philadelphia Warriors selected Frank Gates from the Anderson Packers in the dispersal draft.
- The Philadelphia Warriors selected Easy Parham from the St. Louis Bombers in the dispersal draft.
- The Syracuse Nationals selected Belus Smawley from the St. Louis Bombers in the dispersal draft.
- The Rochester Royals selected Charlie Black from the Anderson Packers in the dispersal draft.
- The Minneapolis Lakers selected Mac Otten from the St. Louis Bombers in the dispersal draft.
- The Fort Wayne Pistons selected John Hargis from the Anderson Packers in the dispersal draft.
- The Baltimore Bullets selected Red Rocha from the St. Louis Bombers in the dispersal draft.
- The Baltimore Bullets selected Bill Roberts from the St. Louis Bombers in the dispersal draft.
- The Baltimore Bullets selected Red Owens from the Anderson Packers in the dispersal draft.
- The Boston Celtics selected Ed Macauley from the St. Louis Bombers in the dispersal draft.
- The Boston Celtics selected Ed Stanczak from the Anderson Packers in the dispersal draft.
- The Washington Capitols selected Ariel Maughan from the St. Louis Bombers in the dispersal draft.
- The Washington Capitols selected Don Putman from the St. Louis Bombers in the dispersal draft.
- The Tri-Cities Blackhawks selected John Logan from the St. Louis Bombers in the dispersal draft.
- The Tri-Cities Blackhawks selected Richie Niemiera from the Anderson Packers in the dispersal draft.

=== April 27, 1950 ===
- Red Auerbach resigns as head coach for Tri-Cities Blackhawks.
- The Boston Celtics hired Red Auerbach as head coach.

=== May 21, 1950 ===
The Chicago Stags sold Frankie Brian to the Tri-Cities Blackhawks.

=== June 19, 1950 ===
- The Baltimore Bullets selected Harry Boykoff from the Waterloo Hawks in the dispersal draft.
- The Baltimore Bullets select Dick Mehen from the Waterloo Hawks in the dispersal draft.

=== June 21, 1950 ===
- The Boston Celtics sold George Kaftan to the New York Knicks.

=== June 22, 1950 ===
- The Denver Nuggets sold Kenny Sailors to the Boston Celtics.

=== June 27, 1950 ===
- The Rochester Royals sold Andy Duncan to the Boston Celtics.

== Notes ==
- ^{a} Number of years played in the NBA prior to the draft
- ^{b} Career with the franchise that drafted the player
- ^{c} Never played a game for the franchise
