= 1947–48 National Basketball League (United States) season =

1947–48 NBL season
- League: National Basketball League
- Sport: Basketball
- Duration: November 1, 1947 – March 21, 1948; March 23 – April 3, 1948 (Playoffs); April 13–18, 1948 (Finals)
- Games: 59–60
- Teams: 11

Regular season
- Season champions: Rochester Royals
- Top seed: Rochester Royals
- Season MVP: George Mikan (Minneapolis)
- Top scorer: George Mikan (Minneapolis)

Playoffs
- Eastern champions: Rochester Royals
- Eastern runners-up: Anderson Duffey Packers
- Western champions: Minneapolis Lakers
- Western runners-up: Tri-Cities Blackhawks

Finals
- Venue: Edgerton Park Arena, Rochester, New York; Minneapolis Auditorium, Minneapolis, Minnesota
- Champions: Minneapolis Lakers
- Runners-up: Rochester Royals

NBL seasons
- ← 1946–47 1948–49 →

The 1947–48 NBL season was the thirteenth overall season for the U.S.A.'s National Basketball League (NBL) and its eleventh and penultimate season under that name after previously going by the Midwest Basketball Conference in its first two seasons of existence. This season would mark the first time that they would be without a defending champion team trying to defend their championship within the league due to the Chicago American Gears defecting from the NBL to create their own short-lived rivaling professional basketball league of their own called the Professional Basketball League of America (PBLA). The regular season began on November 1, 1947, and ran until March 21, 1948. The playoffs began on March 23, 1948, and concluded on April 18, 1948 (with the NBL Championship series being delayed due to the Minneapolis Lakers participating in the 1948 World Professional Basketball Tournament, which happened during the NBL playoff period), with the Minneapolis Lakers winning their first ever professional basketball championship by defeating the Rochester Royals 3 games to 1 in the NBL Championship series. Following this championship series, however, both the Lakers and Royals alongside the Fort Wayne Zollner Pistons and Indianapolis Kautskys would defect from the NBL to the rivaling Basketball Association of America (BAA), with the losses of both the Flint/Midland Dow A.C.'s and Toledo Jeeps later leaving the NBL with only five teams from this season for what would later become their final season of existence.

== Events of the season ==
Entering this season, the NBL would see the addition of the Flint Dow A.C.'s, who had originally operated as an Amateur Athletic Union turned works team that was intended to join the NBL the previous season before missing its initial deadline there, as well as the moving of the woeful Detroit Gems to Minneapolis to become the Minneapolis Lakers. It would also see the removal of both the Youngstown Bears due to financial difficulties and the defending NBL champion Chicago American Gears due to team owner Maurice White being bitter about not being named the President of the NBL and instead defecting his team from the league to create a rivaling professional basketball league of his own called the Professional Basketball League of America, which officially lasted for only a few weeks before it became defunct due to bankruptcy relating to serious financial problems within that league. (While the American Gears did have a chance to return to the NBL through a voting procedure due to how early in the season it was, their decision to decline their return was unanimous and every team outside of the Fort Wayne Zollner Pistons entered into a dispersal draft involving their players soon afterward.) Not only that, but throughout the season, the Flint Dow A.C.'s would often see themselves playing their home games in nearby Midland, Michigan instead of at their designated home venue in Flint, Michigan, which sometimes gave them the moniker of the Midland Dow A.C.'s instead, hence the reason for why they might sometimes be called the Flint/Midland Dow A.C.'s throughout this season instead of just the Flint Dow A.C.'s.

Despite the number of teams decreasing by one this season, the eleven NBL teams would compete in the highest number of regular season scheduled games yet in the league with 60 total games played for each team outside of the Indianapolis Kautskys and Toledo Jeeps (who both only played 59 instead), which was a lot more than the 48 regular season games that the rivaling Basketball Association of America had on board for this season. For the second straight season in a row, the NBL would utilize an extra round of playoff competition, in which the four best teams in each division in the opening round, with the two remaining teams from each division faced off against each other in best of three series matchups in what was considered to be the "Division Semifinals" for each division there before the two teams from each division competed against each other in a return to the best of five series matchup for the NBL championship. For this series, the Minneapolis Lakers would defeat the Rochester Royals three games to one for the Lakers' first and only NBL championship won while in that league, as well as their first ever professional championship won in franchise history. After their next and final season of existence as the NBL occurred, the NBL and Basketball Association of America merged operations to create the National Basketball Association. Despite the NBL continuing to exist until the following season of play in the 1948–49 NBL season as the longer-lasting operation, the NBL would not recognize the twelve NBL seasons as a part of its own history. As such, none of the previous twelve NBL seasons nor even the two MBC seasons would officially be recognized by the NBA, with the NBA recognizing the 1946–47 BAA season as its first official season of play instead.

Following the end of this season, four of the eleven NBL teams that competed in the league this season would successfully switch leagues before the start of the new season, with the new defending NBL champion Minneapolis Lakers, the runner-up Rochester Royals, the Fort Wayne Zollner Pistons, and the Indianapolis Kautskys all successfully defecting from the NBL to the BAA for the 1948–49 BAA season. Two other NBL teams in the Oshkosh All-Stars and the Toledo Jeeps also tried to defect from the NBL to the BAA as well, but they both failed to do so by comparison themselves for reasons that likely related to conditions involving their home venues at the time. Not only that, but both the aforementioned Toledo Jeeps and the Flint/Midland Dow A.C.'s would leave the NBL due to financial difficulties after this season's end as well, leaving the league with only five teams remaining in the league for this season. However, of the teams that still remained intact by this season that would still compete for the NBL's final season of play, four more teams in the Anderson Duffey Packers, the Sheboygan Red Skins, the Syracuse Nationals, and the Tri-Cities Blackhawks would all see themselves enter the National Basketball Association alongside the Lakers, Royals, and Pistons from this season once the NBL-BAA merger officially happened, with the Oshkosh All-Stars also being considered at one point, though they ultimately declined their entry themselves. Both Anderson and Sheboygan would only stay in the NBA to play for the 1949–50 NBA season before leaving the league to create their own rivaling professional basketball league called the National Professional Basketball League. As for the other surviving NBL team that made it to the NBA, they would all end up moving elsewhere at one point in time over the years, but they would all still survive to the present day, with the NBL champion Minneapolis Lakers becoming the Los Angeles Lakers, the Rochester Royals becoming the Sacramento Kings, the Fort Wayne (Zollner) Pistons becoming the Detroit Pistons, the Syracuse Nationals becoming the Philadelphia 76ers, and the Tri-Cities Blackhawks becoming the Atlanta Hawks.

== Teams ==
Eastern Division	Anderson Duffey Packers Anderson, Indiana	Fort Wayne Zollner Pistons Fort Wayne, Indiana	Flint/Midland Dow A.C.'s Flint/Midland, Michigan
Eastern Division	Rochester Royals Rochester, New York	Syracuse Nationals Syracuse, New York	Toledo Jeeps Toledo, Ohio
Western Division	Indianapolis Kautskys Indianapolis, Indiana	Minneapolis Lakers Minneapolis, Minnesota	Oshkosh All-Stars Oshkosh, Wisconsin
Western Division	Sheboygan Red Skins Sheboygan, Wisconsin	Tri-Cities Blackhawks Moline, Illinois	Oshkosh All-Stars Oshkosh, Wisconsin

== Coaching changes ==
Coaching changes
Offseason
Team	1946–47 coach	1947–48 coach
Anderson Duffey Packers	Ike Duffey (interim)	Murray Mendenhall
Detroit Gems/Minneapolis Lakers	Fred Campbell	John Kundla
Fort Wayne Zollner Pistons	Curly Armstrong (interim player-coach)	Carl Bennett
Indianapolis Kautskys	Bob Dietz and Herm Schaefer (interim player-coaches)	Glenn Curtis
Rochester Royals	Eddie Malanowicz	Eddie Malanowicz and Les Harrison
Syracuse Nationals	Jerry Rizzo (player-coach)	Bennie Borgmann
In-season
Team	Outgoing coach	Incoming coach
Flint Dow A.C.'s	Jimmy Walsh	Matt Zunic (player-coach)
Indianapolis Kautskys	Glenn Curtis; Leo Klier (interim player-coach)	Leo Klier (interim player-coach); Bruce Hale (player-coach)
Sheboygan Red Skins	Doxie Moore; Bobby McDermott (player-coach)	Bobby McDermott (player-coach); Doxie Moore
Syracuse Nationals	Bennie Borgmann; Emil Barboni (interim)	Emil Barboni (interim); Danny Biasone
Tri-Cities Blackhawks	Nat Hickey (player-coach); Billy Hassett (interim player-coach)	Billy Hassett (interim player-coach); Bobby McDermott (player-coach)

== Final standings ==
=== Eastern Division ===
Pos.	Eastern Division	Wins	Losses	Win %
1	Rochester Royals	44	16	.733
2	Anderson Duffey Packers	42	18	.700
3	Fort Wayne Zollner Pistons	40	20	.667
4	Syracuse Nationals	24	36	.400
5	Toledo Jeeps	22	37	.373
6	Flint/Midland Dow A.C.'s^{‡}	8	52	.133
^{‡} Flint relocated to Midland during the season and assumed Flint's record in the standings. The Dow A.C.'s franchise got five of their wins out in Flint and three wins out in Midland. (It's unknown what the actual records for Flint's tenure and Midland's tenure were.)

=== Western Division ===
Pos.	Western Division	Wins	Losses	Win %
1	Minneapolis Lakers	43	17	.717
2	Tri-Cities Blackhawks	30	30	.500
3	Oshkosh All-Stars	29	31	.483
4	Indianapolis Kautskys	24	35	.407
5	Sheboygan Red Skins	23	37	.383

== Playoffs ==
Due to the previous season's expansion on teams added (despite them losing a team during this season), the NBL would continue utilizing their expanded playoff formatting for what would later become its penultimate season of existence by first having a divisional opening round with the four best teams in each division competing against each other in a best of five series before the two remaining teams that would be considered the best of each division would compete in what's now called the "Division Semifinals" round in what's weirdly considered a best of three series this time around before the final two teams that would be considered the best from both divisions would compete against each other in a best of five championship series once again. In the opening round, the Eastern Division saw the Rochester Royals once again beat the Fort Wayne Zollner Pistons works team 3–1 and the Anderson Duffey Packers works team crush the Syracuse Nationals in a 3–0 sweep, while the Western Division saw the recently rebranded Minneapolis Lakers defeat the Oshkosh All-Stars 3–1 and the newer Tri-Cities Blackhawks defeat the Indianapolis Kautskys in their own 3–1 series victory in order to set up the divisional semifinal rounds. Entering those next rounds, the Rochester Royals would barely defeat the Anderson Duffey Packers works team in a closer 2–1 series victory, while the Minneapolis Lakers would crush the Tri-Cities Blackhawks with a 2–0 sweep for their shot at the NBL Championship. For the championship series, the Minneapolis Lakers (being led by future Hall of Fame center George Mikan) would defeat the Rochester Royals 3–1 to win their first (and only) NBL championship in franchise history; following this season's end, the new NBL champion Minneapolis Lakers would be joined by the Fort Wayne Zollner Pistons (who would remove the Zollner part of the team name soon afterward to become the Fort Wayne Pistons going forward in their post-NBL era up until they later moved to Detroit, Michigan to become the Detroit Pistons), the Indianapolis Kautskys (who later folded operations after one season of play under their new Indianapolis Jets name), and the Rochester Royals (who currently go by the Sacramento Kings in the present day) as the four NBL teams to defect from the NBL to the younger Basketball Association of America, with the Lakers easily having the most prestigious history of every NBL team around both in their time spent in Minneapolis, Minnesota and their present-day time in Los Angeles, California as the Los Angeles Lakers.

Division Opening Round
E1	Rochester Royals	3
E3	Fort Wayne Zollner Pistons	1
E2	Anderson Duffey Packers	3
E4	Syracuse Nationals	0
W1	Minneapolis Lakers	3
W3	Oshkosh All-Stars	1
W2	Tri-Cities Blackhawks	3
W4	Indianapolis Kautskys	1

Division Semifinals
E1	Rochester Royals	2
E2	Anderson Duffey Packers	1
W1	Minneapolis Lakers	2
W2	Tri-Cities Blackhawks	0

NBL Championship
E1	Rochester Royals	1
W1	Minneapolis Lakers	3

- Bold Series winner

== Statistical leaders ==
Category	Player	Team	Stat
Points	George Mikan	Minneapolis Lakers	1,195
Free-Throws	George Mikan	Minneapolis Lakers	383
Field goals	George Mikan	Minneapolis Lakers	406

Note: Prior to the 1969–70 NBA season, league leaders in points were determined by totals rather than averages. Also, rebounding and assist numbers were not recorded properly in the NBL like they would be in the BAA/NBA, as would field goal and free-throw shooting percentages. George Mikan would also be the only player in NBL history to score over 1,000 points in one NBL season before leaving the league to join the BAA (later known as the NBA by the end of the following season).

== NBL awards ==
- NBL Most Valuable Player: George Mikan, Minneapolis Lakers
- NBL Coach of the Year: Murray Mendenhall, Anderson Duffey Packers
- NBL Rookie of the Year: Mike Todorovich, Sheboygan Red Skins
- All-NBL First Team:
  - F – Jim Pollard, Minneapolis Lakers
  - F/C – Mike Todorovich, Sheboygan Red Skins
  - C – George Mikan, Minneapolis Lakers
  - G/F – Al Cervi, Rochester Royals
  - G – Red Holzman, Rochester Royals
- All-NBL Second Team:
  - G/F – Frank Brian, Anderson Duffey Packers
  - G/F – Bob Calihan, Flint/Midland Dow A.C.'s
  - C – Don Otten, Tri-Cities Blackhawks
  - G – Bob Davies, Rochester Royals
  - G – Bobby McDermott, Sheboygan Red Skins / Tri-Cities Blackhawks
- NBL All-Rookie First Team:
  - F – Jim Pollard, Minneapolis Lakers
  - G/F – Whitey Von Nieda, Tri-Cities Blackhawks
  - C – Mike Todorovich, Sheboygan Red Skins
  - G/F – John Hargis, Anderson Duffey Packers
  - G – Frank Brian, Anderson Duffey Packers
- NBL All-Rookie Second Team:
  - F/C – Charles B. Black, Anderson Duffey Packers
  - F/C – Jim Homer, Syracuse Nationals
  - C – Harry Boykoff, Toledo Jeeps
  - G – Fran Curran, Toledo Jeeps
  - G – Ralph Hamilton, Fort Wayne Zollner Pistons
- NBL All-Rookie Honorable Mention Team
  - F/C – Andy Duncan, Rochester Royals
  - G/F – Jack Smiley, Fort Wayne Zollner Pistons
  - G – Walt Kirk, Fort Wayne Zollner Pistons
  - G/F – Glen Selbo, Oshkosh All-Stars
  - G/F – Walt Lautenbach, Oshkosh All-Stars
  - G/F – Jack Dwan, Minneapolis Lakers
  - G/F – Don Carlson, Minneapolis Lakers

== World Professional Basketball Tournament ==
For the tenth and final World Professional Basketball Tournament ever hosted, it would primarily feature teams from the NBL this time around, as five of the now eight teams there would participate in this condensed tournament that would last in Chicago from April 8–11, 1948, with the only other competition involved this time around being the Wilkes-Barre Barons of the original rivaling American Basketball League (which competed against the Minneapolis Lakers in the first round) and two independently ran teams in the New York Renaissance and the Bridgeport Newfield Steelers, who each went up against each other in the first round. For the NBL teams in the first round, the Lakers would blow out the ABL's Barons with a game-high 98–48 blowout victory, while the Tri-Cities Blackhawks would upset the Fort Wayne Zollner Pistons with a 57–50 victory and the defending WPBT champion Indianapolis Kautskys would be upset by the Anderson Duffey Packers with a 59–53 defeat. In the semifinal round hosted a day later, the Lakers would defeat the Duffey Packers with a close 59–55 victory, while the Blackhawks were edged out by the all-black New York Renaissance in a close 59–56 defeat, leading to the Lakers and the Renaissance (the very first WPBT champions) competing against each other for the final WPBT championship ever held, while the Duffey Packers and the Blackhawks went against each other for the final third-place finish in WPBT history. On April 11, the Duffey Packers would blowout the Blackhawks with a 66–44 victory, while the Lakers would win the final WPBT match ever held with a close 75–71 victory over the Renaissance, thus making the Minneapolis Lakers become the final NBL team to win back-to-back championships in the same season after the Oshkosh All-Stars (who weirdly declined to participate this year) won it all in 1942 and the Fort Wayne Zollner Pistons won both championships in both 1944 and 1945. Not only that, but George Mikan would be named the MVP of the event for the second time in three years, with him joining Buddy Jeannette as the only other player to be named the WPBT MVP in two different years. However, it's been slated that had the New York Renaissance won the 1948 WPBT instead of the Lakers, they could have not only had greater leverage in not just negotiating with the NBL for the upcoming season by being a proper NBL team on their own merits instead of being a last minute replacement team for a squad that folded during that particular season (to the point where they played home games in Dayton, Ohio as the Dayton Rens instead of just playing as the New York Renaissance themselves at their own home venue at the Harlem Renaissance Ballroom in Harlem, New York), but also potentially played in the NBA once that had been created by August 3, 1949, instead of being one of three NBL teams (one of five overall teams) to fold operations.

== The NBL-BAA Relationship: From Friends to Enemies ==
When the NBL started the previous season out with a mutual agreement with most other leagues to not infringe against each other, it would end with them withdrawing entirely from it due in part to a new rivaling league, the Basketball Association of America, ignoring it completely themselves. However, the offseason period would see the two leagues look to get the first signs of cooperation with each other due to them looking to have a cooperative draft system in mind between the two leagues (which was set to have occurred at the time of the 1947 BAA draft at The Leland Hotel since the 1947 NBL draft was supposed to have occurred not too long afterward), a prohibition from raiding players from the other league's team rosters, possible doubleheaders with the NBL and BAA playing teams in their own leagues at a common site and time, and even potentially having a "championship series" of sorts between the two leagues similar to the World Series with Major League Baseball between the National League and the American League (which, had it occurred, would have featured the Minneapolis Lakers on the NBL's side of things and the former American Basketball League team known as the Baltimore Bullets (with the latter team previously having a 34–3 regular season in the ABL) for the BAA's side of things competing to see who the best of the two champions truly were there). Following the Chicago American Gears' permanent removal from the NBL after they created their own short-lived rivaling basketball league, the NBL and BAA would allow for doubleheader matches in the same venue to go down this season at the Chicago Stadium (home of the BAA's Chicago Stags) with a match involving the NBL first and then the BAA second for 22 doubleheader matches occurring from November 15, 1947, until the end of the season. Not only would it look to be beneficial for both leagues this season, but it also looked to be solid first steps for a long-term cooperative friendship between the two leagues.

However, the friendship would not last by the end of the season, as the NBL had gained information that four of their own teams could potentially leave the NBL for the newer BAA instead, either to get a stronger sense of long-term survival from within or to actually get more visible crowds in mind for future matches (or both in the case of the Fort Wayne Zollner Pistons). While it was rumored that two of the teams involved with the potential move involved the Minneapolis Lakers and the aforementioned Fort Wayne Zollner Pistons during the 1948 World Professional Basketball Tournament period, the Minneapolis Star suggested to have a merger go through between the two leagues first instead before both leagues end up being in financial ruin. By the season's end on April 16, 1948, both leagues would meet up at the Morrison Hotel in Chicago (albeit separately) to discuss plans for their following seasons, with a resolution being passed by every NBL team (including the team owners for Fort Wayne, Indianapolis, Minneapolis, and Rochester) that stated where any team that left their league without stated permission from the NBL themselves would have their players become league property and that the NBL would seek injunctions against their players, claiming ownership of their contracts along the way, which came after the NBL announced they would add a new franchise in their league from the city of Detroit, Michigan (which would later be named the Detroit Vagabond Kings). However, some time during the spring of 1948 (presumably on May 9), BAA commissioner Maurice Podoloff met up with Fort Wayne Zollner Pistons head coach and general manager Carl Bennett's home in Fort Wayne, Indiana, with Podoloff suggesting to have three teams in the Fort Wayne Zollner Pistons (who would be planned on being renamed to just the Fort Wayne Pistons due to the BAA not allowing for brands to be a part of team names like the NBL has done), the Indianapolis Kautskys (who also need to be renamed entirely once entering the BAA since Kautskys is a brand name for Kautsky's (local) grocery store), and the NBL's newest champion team in the Minneapolis Lakers (who don't need to be renamed whatsoever) all moving from the NBL to the BAA, with Fort Wayne's team owner, Fred Zollner, approving of the idea the following day (though with the later addition of the runner-up Rochester Royals joining up with the other three teams as well; while the Oshkosh All-Stars and Toledo Jeeps were also have suggested to join up alongside those four as well, those two were ultimately rejected by the BAA by comparison to the other four teams at hand), with the considered approval from the NBL making the transition of those four teams jumping from the NBL to the BAA being made official on May 10 through new NBL commissioner Doxie Moore.

By July 1948, the NBL started to threaten both legal action and a bidding war on players coming directly out of college, especially following the 1948 BAA draft period (which was originally meant to be a coincided 1948 BAA/NBL draft at the time before the NBL lost four of its teams to the BAA). Originally, all three of Ike W. Duffey from the NBL's side, Carl Bennett, and Maurice Podoloff from the BAA's side had attempted to seek some sort of reconciliation; while the tone set at first was cordial between them all, no progress was ultimately made from it. In fact, by the end of the meeting, Duffey wrote a telegraph message that he intended to send to the other NBL owners that said no progress was possible and that NBL owners should feel free to raid BAA teams for their players, which would be a declaration of war between the two leagues since the BAA would inform its owners that they had the same latitude as well. Attempts at reconciliation were tried a second time a month later in August, but that second try would also be unsuccessful, and by that point, the NBL would just be focused on trying its hand at successfully completing its 1948–49 season as best as they possibly could do so.

== See also ==
- National Basketball League (United States)
- 1947–48 BAA season, the rivaling season of what would eventually be their merging partner to form the National Basketball Association in the younger Basketball Association of America
- Professional Basketball League of America, a short-lived season the Chicago American Gears had
