= Richie Niemiera =

American basketball player and coach

Personal information
- Born: May 26, 1921 Chicago, Illinois, U.S.
- Died: December 27, 2003 (aged 82) Berwyn, Illinois, U.S.
- Listed height: 6 ft 1 in (1.85 m)
- Listed weight: 165 lb (75 kg)

Career information
- High school: Weber (Chicago, Illinois)
- College: Notre Dame (1940–1943)
- Playing career: 1944–1951
- Position: Shooting guard / small forward
- Number: 23, 5, 4
- Coaching career: 1951–1974

Career history

Playing
- 1944–1946: Wilmington Bombers
- 1946–1950: Fort Wayne Zollner Pistons
- 1950–1951: Anderson Packers

Coaching
- 1951–1958: Weber HS
- 1958–1973: Little Flower HS
- 1973–1974: De La Salle Institute (assistant)
- Stats at NBA.com
- Stats at Basketball Reference

John Richard Niemiera (May 26, 1921 – December 27, 2003) was an American professional basketball player and coach. He spent two season in the National Basketball League (NBL) and one season in the Basketball Association of America (BAA) and one season in the National Basketball Association (NBA). During his NBL career he played for the Fort Wayne Zollner Pistons during the 1946–47 and 1947–48 seasons. He continued playing for the Pistons once they joined the BAA. During his final season in the NBA, Niemiera played for Anderson Packers after being traded by the Pistons along with Charles B. Black for Ralph Johnson and Howie Schultz. He attended the University of Notre Dame.

== BAA/NBA career statistics ==
Legend
GP	Games played	FG%	Field-goal percentage
FT%	Free-throw percentage	APG	Assists per game
PPG	Points per game	**Bold**	Career high

=== Regular season ===
Year	Team	GP	FG%	FT%	APG	PPG
1948–49	Fort Wayne	**55**	.347	**.800**	1.7	**6.6**
1949–50	Fort Wayne	31	.285	.767	**2.0**	5.6
1949–50	Anderson	29	**.357**	.727	1.9	5.2
Career		115	.330	.776	1.8	6.0

=== Playoffs ===
Year	Team	GP	FG%	FT%	APG	PPG
1950	Anderson	8	.407	.750	1.0	3.5
Career		8	.407	.750	1.0	3.5
