= Hook Dillon =

American basketball player

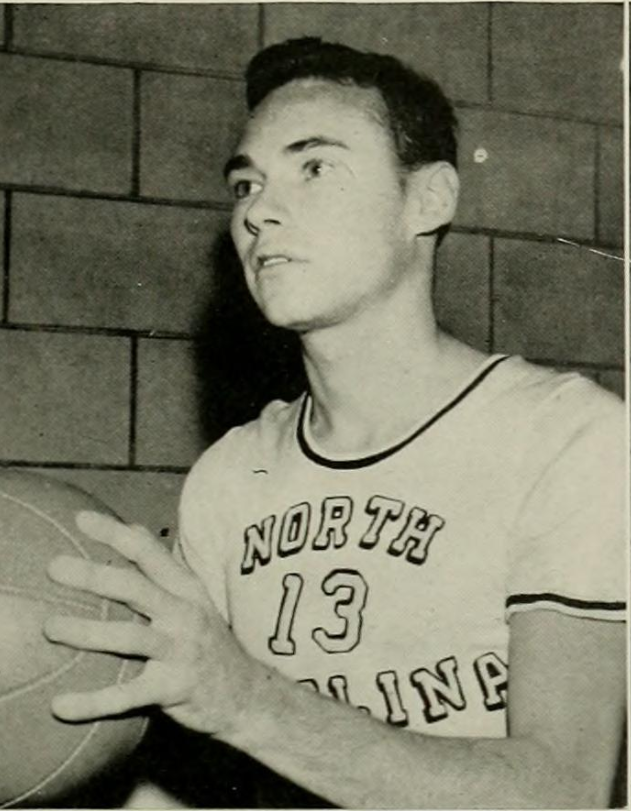
- Dillon as a member of the 1944–45 North Carolina Tar Heels

Personal information
- Born: January 8, 1924 Savannah, Georgia, U.S.
- Died: January 18, 2004 (aged 80) Winston-Salem, North Carolina, U.S.
- Listed height: 6 ft 3 in (1.91 m)
- Listed weight: 180 lb (82 kg)

Career information
- High school: Benedictine (Savannah, Georgia)
- College: North Carolina (1944–1948)
- NBA draft: 1948: – round, –
- Drafted by: Chicago Stags
- Playing career: 1949–1950
- Position: Small forward / power forward
- Number: 22

Career history
- 1949–1950: Washington Capitols

Career highlights
- Consensus second-team All-American (1946)

Career NBA statistics
- Points: 36
- Assists: 5
- Games played: 22
- Stats at NBA.com
- Stats at Basketball Reference

John Joseph "Hook" Dillon (January 8, 1924 – January 18, 2004) was an American basketball player.

He played collegiately for the University of North Carolina from 1945 to 1948. Prior to attending UNC, he previously played in the Savannah (GA) Ice Delivery city league and Benedictine Military Academy.

Dillon earned All-America honors in 1946 and 1947. He was the leading scorer on the 1946 team, which was UNC's first team to ever reach the Final Four. He first started gaining national attention early in 1946 against New York University in Madison Square Garden when he scored 21 points, many on his deadly hook shot. After the game, the media declared his shot to be one of the best ever showcased in Madison Square Garden, and the nickname stuck.

Because of his national accolades, Dillon's number 13 was honored by the University of North Carolina and currently hangs in the rafters of the Dean Smith Center.

Dillon had a brief professional career with the Toronto Huskies and Washington Capitols of the NBA.

He died on January 18, 2004.

== NBA career statistics ==
Legend
GP	Games played	GS	Games started	MPG	Minutes per game
FG%	Field goal percentage	3P%	3-point field goal percentage	FT%	Free throw percentage
RPG	Rebounds per game	APG	Assists per game	SPG	Steals per game
BPG	Blocks per game	PPG	Points per game	**Bold**	Career high

=== Regular season ===
Year	Team	GP	FG%	FT%	APG	PPG
1949–50	Washington	22	.182	.727	.2	1.6
Career		22	.182	.727	.2	1.6

=== Playoffs ===
Year	Team	GP	FG%	FT%	APG	PPG
1950	Washington	1	1.000	1.000	0.0	4.0
Career		1	1.000	1.000	0.0	4.0
