= 1949–50 Anderson Packers season =

- Head coach: Howie Schultz; Ike Duffey; Doxie Moore
- Arena: Anderson High School Wigwam

Results
- Record: 37–27 (.578)
- Place: Division: 2nd (Western)
- Playoff finish: NBA Semifinals (eliminated 0-2)
- Stats at Basketball Reference

The 1949–50 Anderson Packers season was the only season for the Anderson Packers in the National Basketball Association (NBA), as well as their fourth professional season of existence when including the seasons they played in the preceding National Basketball League as the Anderson Duffey Packers sponsorship name involving the Duffey meat packing company they were originally affiliated with called Duffey's Incorporated and their fifth overall season of play when including their only independent season under their original Anderson Chiefs (sometimes expanded out more as the Chief Anderson Meat Packers) name. This season was notable for a game they played on November 24, 1949, with the Packers playing a quintuple-overtime game against the Syracuse Nationals (which was an NBA record at the time), though the Packers would lose that game 125–123. This game was also notable for the fact that it still holds the record for the most fouls recorded by both teams played in one game with 113 total fouls made, with Anderson having the NBA record of 60 fouls set that night. Following the conclusion of this season, they would withdraw their operations from participating in the NBA altogether due in part to pressure against big-market areas like New York, Boston, and Philadelphia voicing their dismay against playing in places like Anderson during the season (though the reason for Anderson's removal despite their semifinal appearance actually related to the poor health of team owner and one-time head coach, Ike Duffey), which led to the Packers, Sheboygan Red Skins, Waterloo Hawks, and the original Denver Nuggets (who would later rebrand themselves as the Denver Frontier Refiners at first) creating the short-lived rivaling National Professional Basketball League as a failed effort to survive beyond the NBA.

== Draft picks ==
The Anderson (Duffey) Packers would participate in the 1949 NBL draft, which occurred months before the National Basketball League and the rivaling Basketball Association of America would merge operations to become the present-day National Basketball Association. However, as of 2026, no records of what the (Duffey) Packers' draft picks were for the NBL have properly come up, with any information on who those final selections might have been being lost to time in the process.

== Roster ==
1949–50 Anderson Packers roster
Players

Pos.	No.	Player	Height	Weight	DOB	From
F/C	7	Charles B. Black	6 ft 5 in (1.96 m)	200 lb (91 kg)		Kansas
G	8	Frank Brian	6 ft 1 in (1.85 m)	180 lb (82 kg)		LSU
F/C		Jake Carter	6 ft 4 in (1.93 m)	195 lb (88 kg)		East Texas A&M
F/C	11	Bill Closs	6 ft 5 in (1.96 m)	195 lb (88 kg)		Rice
G	3	Frank Gates	6 ft 0 in (1.83 m)	160 lb (73 kg)		Sam Houston State
G/F	6	John Hargis	6 ft 2 in (1.88 m)	180 lb (82 kg)		Texas
G	4	Boag Johnson	5 ft 11 in (1.80 m)	170 lb (77 kg)		Huntington
G/F	9	Walt Kirk	6 ft 3 in (1.91 m)	173 lb (78 kg)		Illinois
F/C		Milo Komenich	6 ft 7 in (2.01 m)	212 lb (96 kg)		Wyoming
C		Murray Mitchell	6 ft 6 in (1.98 m)			Sam Houston State
G/F	4	Richie Niemiera	6 ft 1 in (1.85 m)	165 lb (75 kg)		Notre Dame
G/F	9	Red Owens	6 ft 3 in (1.91 m)	185 lb (84 kg)		Baylor
F/C	7	Howie Schultz	6 ft 6 in (1.98 m)	200 lb (91 kg)		Hamline
G/F	5	Rollie Seltz	5 ft 10 in (1.78 m)	165 lb (75 kg)		Hamline
G/F	15	Jack Smiley	6 ft 3 in (1.91 m)	190 lb (86 kg)		Illinois
F	10	Ed Stanczak	6 ft 1 in (1.85 m)	185 lb (84 kg)		Central HS (IN)

Coaches
Head coach
- Howie Schultz
- Ike Duffey
- Doxie Moore

Legend
- (DP) Unsigned draft pick
- (FA) Free agent
- (S) Suspended
- Injured

== Regular season ==
=== Season standings ===
Western Division	W	L	PCT	GB	Home	Road	Neutral	Div
x-Indianapolis Olympians	39	25	.609	–	24–7	12–16	3–2	26–9
x-Anderson Packers	37	27	.578	2	22–9	12–18	3–0	25–12
x-Tri-Cities Blackhawks	29	35	.453	10	20–13	6–20	3–2	20–17
x-Sheboygan Red Skins	22	40	.355	17	17–14	5–22	0–4	15–20
Waterloo Hawks	19	43	.306	20	16–15	2–22	1–6	13–22
Denver Nuggets	11	51	.177	28	9–16	1–25	1–10	8–27

=== Game log ===
1949–50 game log
Total: 37–27
November

Game	Date	Team	Score	High points	Location Attendance	Record
1	November 3	Tri-Cities	W 110–87	Frank Brian (25)		1–0
2	November 8	vs. St. Louis	W 70–62	Rollie Seltz (15)		2–0
3	November 9	vs. Tri-Cities	W 102–99	Boag Johnson (19)		3–0
4	November 12	Syracuse	L 69–84	Ed Stanczak (13)		3–1
5	November 13	@ Waterloo	W 81–69	Brian, Seltz (17)		4–1
6	November 15	@ Indianapolis	W 83–72	Rollie Seltz (15)		5–1
7	November 19	Minneapolis	W 83–80	Bill Closs (17)		6–1
8	November 21	Boston	L 85–99	Boag Johnson (16)		6–2
9	November 24	@ Syracuse	L 123–125	Frank Brian (18)		6–3
10	November 26	St. Louis	W 73–63	Frank Brian (15)		7–3
11	November 27	@ Sheboygan	W 111–91	Howie Schultz (18)		8–3
12	November 28	Waterloo	W 101–87	Frank Brian (23)		9–3

December

Game	Date	Team	Score	High points	Location Attendance	Record
13	December 1	Tri-Cities	W 81–72	Ed Stanczak (16)		10–3
14	December 5	Sheboygan	W 88–81	Frank Brian (17)		11–3
15	December 8	Indianapolis	L 69–72	Frank Brian (18)		11–4
16	December 10	@ Waterloo	W 87–83	Frank Brian (17)		12–4
17	December 12	Fort Wayne	W 105–97	Frank Brian (27)		13–4
18	December 15	Syracuse	W 100–88	Frank Brian (21)		14–4
19	December 17	@ Sheboygan	W 110–91	Hargis, Schultz (15)		14–5
20	December 18	@ Tri-Cities	W 78–69	Frank Brian (17)		15–5
21	December 19	New York	L 83–86	John Hargis (20)		15–6
22	December 22	Waterloo	W 101–84	John Hargis (24)		16–6
23	December 25	@ Syracuse	L 88–94	Bill Closs (20)		16–7
24	December 26	Washington	W 80–73	Frank Brian (17)		17–7
25	December 27	@ Indianapolis	L 82–89	Bill Closs (23)		17–8
26	December 29	Chicago	L 80–81	Frank Brian (17)		17–9

January

Game	Date	Team	Score	High points	Location Attendance	Record
27	January 1	@ Minneapolis	L 75–87	Frank Brian (30)		17–10
28	January 2	Baltimore	W 92–75	John Hargis (26)		18–10
29	January 4	@ Denver	L 82–86	John Hargis (22)		18–11
30	January 5	@ Denver	L 69–76	Milo Komenich (21)		18–12
31	January 9	Sheboygan	W 112–89	Frank Brian (25)		19–12
32	January 11	@ Tri-Cities	L 81–88	Frank Brian (19)		19–13
33	January 12	Waterloo	W 80–69	Brian, Hargis (15)		20–13
34	January 15	@ Sheboygan	L 76–81	Bill Closs (18)		20–14
35	January 16	Denver	W 95–83	Frank Brian (16)		21–14
36	January 19	Rochester	L 78–81	Frank Brian (29)		21–15
37	January 21	@ Rochester	L 79–95	Frank Brian (25)		21–16
38	January 22	@ Syracuse	W 77–75	Frank Brian (19)		22–16
39	January 23	Tri-Cities	L 96–99	Frank Brian (28)		22–17
40	January 26	Denver	W 109–75	Frank Brian (29)		23–17
41	January 27	Indianapolis	L 78–91	Frank Brian (27)		23–18
42	January 30	Sheboygan	W 91–74	Black, Closs (18)		24–18

February

Game	Date	Team	Score	High points	Location Attendance	Record
43	February 1	@ Waterloo	W 86–73	Bill Closs (20)		25–18
44	February 3	@ Boston	L 98–106	Frank Brian (33)		25–19
45	February 4	@ Baltimore	L 70–90	Charles Black (18)		25–20
46	February 5	@ Fort Wayne	L 85–95	Frank Brian (17)		25–21
47	February 6	Philadelphia	W 77–75	Frank Brian (25)		26–21
48	February 10	@ Indianapolis	W 107–76	Frank Brian (20)		27–21
49	February 11	@ Washington	L 69–81	Frank Brian (20)		27–22
50	February 13	Waterloo	W 93–80	Richie Niemiera (18)		28–22
51	February 16	@ Denver	W 95–86	Brian, Closs (21)		29–22
52	February 19	@ Denver	L 85–86	Frank Brian (25)		29–23
53	February 22	@ Tri-Cities	W 90–81	Milo Komenich (23)		30–23
54	February 27	Syracuse	W 97–73	Charles Black (17)		31–23

March

Game	Date	Team	Score	High points	Location Attendance	Record
55	March 2	Denver	W 85–72	Frank Brian (32)		32–23
56	March 5	@ Chicago	W 89–73	Frank Brian (24)		33–23
57	March 6	Tri-Cities	W 88–77	Frank Brian (26)		34–23
58	March 7	@ Indianapolis	L 93–107	Frank Brian (18)		34–24
59	March 8	@ Tri-Cities	W 82–67	Milo Komenich (21)		35–24
60	March 9	Indianapolis	L 90–97	Bill Closs (19)		35–25
61	March 11	vs. New York	W 91–89	John Hargis (23)		36–25
62	March 13	Sheboygan	W 98–86	John Hargis (25)		37–25
63	March 15	@ Philadelphia	L 80–83	John Hargis (16)		37–26
64	March 19	@ Syracuse	L 67–72	Red Owens (14)		37–27

Neutral Games:

November 8 vs St. Louis was played in Richmond, Indiana

November 9 vs Tri-Cities was played in Chicago, Illinois

March 11 vs New York was played in Chicago, Illinois

== NBA Playoffs ==
=== NBA Western Division Semifinals ===
(2) Anderson Packers vs. (3) Tri-Cities Blackhawks: Packers win series 2-1

- Game 1 @ Anderson (March 21): Anderson 89, Tri-Cities 77
- Game 2 @ Tri-Cities (March 23): Tri-Cities 76, Anderson 75
- Game 3 @ Anderson (March 24): Anderson 94, Tri-Cities 71

This was the first and only playoff meeting between the Packers and Blackhawks.

=== NBA Western Division Finals ===
(1) Indianapolis Olympians vs. (2) Anderson Packers: Packers win series 2-1

- Game 1 @ Indianapolis (March 28): Indianapolis 77, Anderson 74
- Game 2 @ Anderson (March 30): Anderson 84, Indianapolis 67
- Game 3 @ Indianapolis (April 1): Anderson 67, Indianapolis 65

This was the first and only playoff meeting between the Olympians and Packers.

=== NBA Semifinals ===
(1) Minneapolis Lakers vs. (2) Anderson Packers: Lakers win series 2-0

- Game 1 @ Minneapolis (April 5): Minneapolis 75, Anderson 50
- Game 2 @ Anderson (April 6): Minneapolis 90, Anderson 71

This was the first and only playoff meeting between the Lakers and Packers.

== Dispersal Draft ==
After the Packers withdrew their operations from the NBA on April 10, 1950, in order to later create the short-lived rivaling National Professional Basketball League alongside the Sheboygan Red Skins, Waterloo Hawks, and original Denver Nuggets franchise, only Anderson from the original four teams that withdrew from the NBA into the newly-formed NPBL would officially have their players enter a dispersal draft for NBA teams to acquire their players from. The former Packers players would also be drafted alongside players that previously played for the St. Louis Bombers, who officially disbanded as a franchise two weeks after the Packers withdrew as a franchise in the NBA on April 24 that same year (which coincidentally was also the same day the other former NBA teams left to help create the NPBL), with the dispersal draft involving former Packers and Bombers players being the first official dispersal draft of the 1950–51 NBA season period occurring on August 25, 1950. The following teams acquired these players from the Packers during the dispersal draft period.

- Baltimore Bullets: Red Owens
- Boston Celtics: Ed Stanczak
- Chicago Stags: Frank Brian (would not play for the Stags due to them folding a month before the NBA's season began; later played for the Tri-Cities Blackhawks instead)
- Fort Wayne Pistons: John Hargis
- Philadelphia Warriors: Bill Closs, Frank Gates, & Milo Komenich
- Rochester Royals: Charles B. Black
- Tri-Cities Blackhawks: Richie Niemiera (later included Frank Brian)
