= Rollie Seltz =

American basketball player (1924–2022)

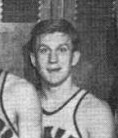
- Seltz in 1947

Personal information
- Born: January 25, 1924 McIntosh, Minnesota, U.S.
- Died: October 13, 2022 (aged 98) Shoreview, Minnesota, U.S.
- Listed height: 5 ft 10 in (1.78 m)
- Listed weight: 165 lb (75 kg)

Career information
- High school: Humboldt (Saint Paul, Minnesota)
- College: Hamline (1942–1946)
- Playing career: 1946–1951
- Position: Shooting guard / small forward
- Number: 5

Career history
- 1946–1948: Anderson Duffey Packers
- 1948–1949: Waterloo Hawks
- 1949–1950: Anderson Packers
- 1950–1951: Saint Paul Lights

Career highlights
- Second-team All-American – Converse (1946)
- Stats at NBA.com
- Stats at Basketball Reference

Rolland John Seltz (January 25, 1924 – October 13, 2022) was an American professional basketball player who played in the National Basketball Association (NBA) during its first year of existence. He played 34 games for the Anderson Packers during the 1949–50 season.

== Early life ==
Seltz was born in McIntosh, Minnesota, on January 25, 1924. He attended Humboldt Senior High School in nearby Saint Paul. He then studied at Hamline University, where he was named an All-American by Converse in 1946. While in college, he also played minor league baseball for the Duluth Dukes, Jamestown Falcons, Rochester Red Wings, Lynchburg Cardinals and Allentown Cardinals, posting a .266 batting average with 42 home runs and 242 runs batted in in 400 games. This arrangement attracted controversy during the 1944–45 season, since it was regarded in some quarters as a violation of his amateur status for college basketball.

== Professional career ==
Following his college career, Seltz joined the Anderson Duffey Packers of the National Basketball League (NBL) in 1946. He played two seasons for the Packers and one for the Waterloo Hawks, averaging 8.1 points per game in 1948–49. The following season, Seltz re-joined the Packers as the team moved to the new National Basketball Association (formed through a merger of the NBL and the Basketball Association of America). He made his NBA debut for the franchise on November 3, 1949, scoring 18 points and making four of five free throws against the Tri-Cities Blackhawks. Seltz averaged 7.8 points per game and 1.9 assists per game during the 1949–50 season.

While playing professional basketball, Seltz continued playing baseball for Excelsior of the Minnesota Valley League. He was part of the team that won the Class-A championship in 1949, and was honored as the tournament's most valuable player after batting .643 and committing no errors in 27 chances. He also served as a player–manager that year.

Seltz was inducted into Hamline's Athletic Hall of Fame in 1970. He was also honored in his high school's hall of fame.

== Personal life ==
Seltz's first marriage was to Florence Elliott. After they divorced, he married Muriel. They remained married for 45 years until his death. They raised 11 children together, all from their respective previous marriages. After retiring from professional basketball, he became the owner of Seltz Insurance Agency.

Seltz died on October 13, 2022, at the age of 98.

== Career statistics ==
Legend
GP	Games played	GS	Games started	MPG	Minutes per game
FG%	Field goal percentage	3P%	3-point field goal percentage	FT%	Free throw percentage
RPG	Rebounds per game	APG	Assists per game	SPG	Steals per game
BPG	Blocks per game	PPG	Points per game	**Bold**	Career high

=== NBA ===
==== Regular season ====
Year	Team	GP	FG%	FT%	APG	PPG
1949–50	Anderson	34	.301	.769	1.9	7.8
