= Ed Stanczak =

American basketball player

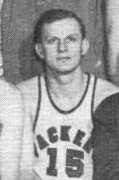
- Stanczak, 1947

Personal information
- Born: August 15, 1921 Fort Wayne, Indiana, U.S.
- Died: May 30, 2004 (aged 82) Hidalgo, Texas, U.S.
- Listed height: 6 ft 1 in (1.85 m)
- Listed weight: 185 lb (84 kg)

Career information
- High school: Central (Fort Wayne, Indiana)
- Playing career: 1946–1951
- Position: Guard
- Number: 10, 21, 19

Career history
- 1946–1950: Anderson Chiefs/(Duffey) Packers
- 1950–1951: Boston Celtics
- 1950–1951: Utica Pros

Career highlights
- NBL champion (1949)
- Stats at NBA.com
- Stats at Basketball Reference

Edmund Andrew Stanczak (August 15, 1921 – May 30, 2004) was an American professional basketball player. He played for the Anderson Packers between 1946 and 1950, then the Boston Celtics in 1950–51. In 1948–49 – Anderson's last season as a member of the National Basketball League – Stanczak led the league in games played (61) and helped them win the NBL championship.

== NBA career statistics ==
Legend
GP	Games played	MPG	Minutes per game
FG%	Field-goal percentage	FT%	Free-throw percentage
RPG	Rebounds per game	APG	Assists per game
PPG	Points per game	**Bold**	Career high

=== Regular season ===
Year	Team	GP	FG%	FT%	RPG	APG	PPG
1949–50	Anderson	**57**	**.349**	.752	–	**1.2**	**9.1**
1950–51	Boston	19	.240	**.800**	**1.9**	0.4	3.2
Career		76	.338	.759	1.9	1.0	7.6

=== Playoffs ===
Year	Team	GP	FG%	FT%	APG	PPG
1950	Anderson	8	.292	.767	1.3	6.4
Career		8	.292	.767	1.3	6.4
