= Bill Closs =

American basketball player

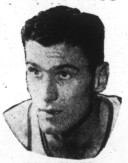
- Closs, circa 1947

Personal information
- Born: January 8, 1922 Edge, Texas, U.S.
- Died: June 6, 2011 (aged 89) Palo Alto, California, U.S.
- Listed height: 6 ft 5 in (1.96 m)
- Listed weight: 195 lb (88 kg)

Career information
- High school: Hearne (Hearne, Texas)
- College: Rice (1940–1943)
- Playing career: 1949–1952
- Position: Small forward
- Number: 11, 16, 14

Career history
- 1946–1948: Indianapolis Kautskys
- 1948–1950: Anderson Packers
- 1950–1951: Philadelphia Warriors
- 1951–1952: Fort Wayne Pistons

Career highlights
- NBL champion (1949); All-NBL Second Team (1949); Consensus first-team All-American (1943); First-team All-SWC (1943); No 22 retired by Rice Owls
- Stats at NBA.com
- Stats at Basketball Reference

Bill Tom Closs (January 8, 1922 – June 6, 2011) was an American basketball player. He played collegiately for Rice University. In his final year, he led the Southwest Conference in scoring and was All-American in 1943. In 1971 he was inducted into the Rice Athletic Hall of Fame, and in 2003 his basketball jersey was retired.

He joined the Marine Reserve while still at Rice, and was posted in the Fleet Marine Force Pacific Headquarters in Oahu, Hawaii in 1944.

Closs started professional basketball with Indianapolis in 1946. He played for the Anderson Packers (1948–50), Philadelphia Warriors (1950–51) and Fort Wayne Pistons (1951–52) in the National Basketball Association (NBA) for 186 games. Following the conclusion of his professional basketball career, Closs enjoyed over 35 years of success in the sporting goods industry.

Closs died on June 6, 2011.

== Career statistics ==
Legend
GP	Games played	GS	Games started	MPG	Minutes per game
FG%	Field goal percentage	3P%	3-point field goal percentage	FT%	Free throw percentage
RPG	Rebounds per game	APG	Assists per game	SPG	Steals per game
BPG	Blocks per game	PPG	Points per game	**Bold**	Career high

=== NBA ===
==== Regular season ====
Year	Team	GP	MPG	FG%	FT%	RPG	APG	PPG
1949–50	Anderson	64		.315	.718		**2.5**	**11.8**
1950–51	Philadelphia	**65**		**.320**	**.744**	**6.2**	1.7	8.8
1951–52	Fort Wayne	57	**19.6**	.308	.682	3.6	1.3	6.1
Career		186	19.6	.315	.718	5.0	1.9	9.0

==== Playoffs ====
Year	Team	GP	MPG	FG%	FT%	RPG	APG	PPG
1950	Anderson	**8**		**.303**	.833		1.8	**11.4**
1951	Philadelphia	2		.250	.600	4.0	2.5	3.5
1952	Fort Wayne	1	**21.0**	.167	**1.000**	**8.0**	**4.0**	5.0
Career		11	21.0	.293	.816	5.3	2.1	9.4
