= Red Owens =

American basketball player

Personal information
- Born: September 2, 1925 Texas, U.S.
- Died: October 11, 1988 (aged 63)
- Listed height: 6 ft 3 in (1.91 m)
- Listed weight: 185 lb (84 kg)

Career information
- High school: Northside (Houston, Texas)
- College: Baylor (1946–1949)
- BAA draft: 1949: 2nd round, —
- Drafted by: Washington Capitols
- Position: Shooting guard
- Number: 9, 4

Career history
- 1949: Tri-Cities Blackhawks
- 1949–1950: Anderson Packers
- 1951: Baltimore Bullets
- 1951–1952: Milwaukee Hawks
- Stats at NBA.com
- Stats at Basketball Reference

James L. "Red" Owens (September 2, 1925 – October 11, 1988) was an American professional basketball player.

A 6'3" guard/forward from Baylor University, Owens played two seasons (1949–1950 and 1951–1952) in the National Basketball Association (NBA) as a member of the Tri-Cities Blackhawks, Anderson Packers, Baltimore Bullets, and Milwaukee Hawks.

== Career statistics ==
Legend
GP	Games played	GS	Games started	MPG	Minutes per game
FG%	Field goal percentage	3P%	3-point field goal percentage	FT%	Free throw percentage
RPG	Rebounds per game	APG	Assists per game	SPG	Steals per game
BPG	Blocks per game	PPG	Points per game	**Bold**	Career high

=== NBA ===
==== Regular season ====
Year	Team	GP	MPG	FG%	FT%	RPG	APG	PPG
1949–50	Tri-Cities	26	–	.307	**.678**	–	1.2	4.8
1949–50	Anderson	**35**	–	.291	.667	–	1.2	3.3
1951–52	Baltimore	19	17.9	**.342**	.533	**3.7**	1.7	7.9
1951–52	Milwaukee	10	**28.5**	.308	.615	3.1	**3.2**	**8.0**
Career		90	21.6	.313	.614	3.5	1.5	5.2

==== Playoffs ====
Year	Team	GP	FG%	FT%	APG	PPG
1950	Anderson	8	.292	.683	2.4	10.0
