= John Mahnken =

American basketball player

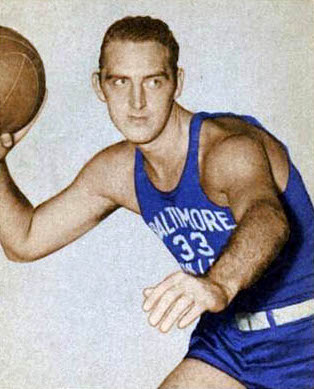
- Mahnken in 1948

Personal information
- Born: June 16, 1922 West New York, New Jersey
- Died: December 14, 2000 (aged 78)
- Listed height: 6 ft 8 in (2.03 m)
- Listed weight: 220 lb (100 kg)

Career information
- High school: Memorial (West New York, New Jersey)
- College: Georgetown (1942–1943)
- Playing career: 1945–1953
- Position: Center
- Number: 12, 7, 77, 24, 15, 16, 19

Career history
- 1945–1946: Rochester Royals
- 1946–1948: Washington Capitols
- 1948: Baltimore Bullets
- 1948: Indianapolis Jets
- 1948–1949: Fort Wayne Pistons
- 1949–1950: Tri-Cities Blackhawks
- 1950–1951: Boston Celtics
- 1951: Indianapolis Olympians
- 1951–1953: Boston Celtics

Career highlights
- NBL champion (1946); First-team All-American – Helms (1943)
- Stats at NBA.com
- Stats at Basketball Reference

John Emmanuel Mahnken (June 16, 1922 – December 14, 2000) was an American professional basketball player.

A 6'8" center from West New York, New Jersey, Mahnken played high school basketball at Memorial High School in his hometown. He played at Georgetown University during the early 1940s, earning All-American honors in 1943. He served in the United States Army from 1943 to 1945, then embarked on a professional career in the National Basketball League with the Rochester Royals. Mahnken won the 1946 league title on a Royals team which included future New York Knicks coach Red Holzman and future television actor Chuck Connors.

In 1946, Mahnken was signed by Red Auerbach to the Washington Capitols of the Basketball Association of America (which merged with the NBL in 1949 to become the modern NBA). Mahnken was traded to the Baltimore Bullets in 1948, and he was traded five other times until finding stability with the Boston Celtics in 1951. Mahnken competed for the Celtics until 1953, retiring from the NBA that year with career. statistics of 5.8 points per game and 2.9 rebounds per game. He holds the NBA record for worst career field goal percentage all-time.

== BAA/NBA career statistics ==
Legend
GP	Games played	MPG	Minutes per game
FG%	Field-goal percentage	FT%	Free-throw percentage
RPG	Rebounds per game	APG	Assists per game
PPG	Points per game	**Bold**	Career high

=== Regular season ===
Year	Team	GP	MPG	FG%	FT%	RPG	APG	PPG
1946–47	Washington	60	–	.255	.681	–	1.0	9.3
1947–48	Washington	48	–	.249	.614	–	.6	6.6
1948–49	Baltimore	7	–	.263	.611	–	1.3	7.6
1948–49	Indianapolis	13	–	.246	.467	–	**2.6**	**10.0**
1948–49	Fort Wayne	37	–	.265	.664	–	2.2	9.5
1949–50	Fort Wayne	2	–	**.375**	.333	–	1.0	3.5
1949–50	Tri-Cities	36	–	.266	**.697**	–	1.8	6.2
1949–50	Boston	24	–	.262	.639	–	1.8	4.6
1950–51	Boston	46	–	.342	.648	**4.0**	1.5	5.2
1950–51	Indianapolis	12	–	.170	.625	2.9	.8	2.3
1951–52	Boston	60	9.7	.344	.605	2.2	1.1	3.0
1952–53	Boston	**69**	**11.2**	.302	.696	2.6	1.1	2.8
Career		414	10.5	.272	.650	2.9	1.3	5.8

=== Playoffs ===
Year	Team	GP	MPG	FG%	FT%	RPG	APG	PPG
1947	Washington	**6**	–	.240	.842	–	.2	**10.3**
1951	Indianapolis	3	–	.133	.000	**3.7**	**3.0**	1.3
1952	Boston	3	**16.7**	**.286**	.500	3.3	1.0	2.3
1953	Boston	**6**	12.0	.000	**1.000**	3.2	1.0	.8
Career		18	13.6	.211	.800	3.3	1.1	4.3
