= 1946 NCAA Men's Basketball All-Americans =

- Awarded for: 1945–46 NCAA men's basketball season

The consensus 1946 College Basketball All-American team, as determined by aggregating the results of four major All-American teams. To earn "consensus" status, a player must win honors from a majority of the following teams: the Helms Athletic Foundation, Converse, The Sporting News, and True Magazine.

== 1946 Consensus All-America team ==
Consensus First Team
| Player | Position | Class | Team |
|---|---|---|---|
| Leo Klier | F | Senior | Notre Dame |
| Bob Kurland | C | Senior | Oklahoma A&M |
| George Mikan | C | Senior | DePaul |
| Max Morris | F | Senior | Northwestern |
| Sid Tanenbaum | G | Junior | NYU |

Consensus Second Team
| Player | Position | Class | Team |
|---|---|---|---|
| Charles B. Black | F | Junior | Kansas |
| John Dillon | G | Sophomore | North Carolina |
| Billy Hassett | G | Senior | Notre Dame |
| Tony Lavelli | F | Freshman | Yale |
| Jack Parkinson | G | Junior | Kentucky |
| Ken Sailors | G | Senior | Wyoming |

== Individual All-America teams ==
All-America Team
| All-America Team | First team | | Second team | | Third team | |
| All-America Team | Player | School | Player | School | Player | School |
|---|---|---|---|---|---|---|
| Helms | Charles B. Black | Kansas | Ernie Calverley | Rhode Island | Nick Buzolich | Pepperdine |
| Helms | Paul Huston | Ohio State | Billy Gabor | Syracuse | John Dillon | North Carolina |
| Helms | Jim Jordan | North Carolina | Jackie Goldsmith | Long Island | Bill Flynt | Arkansas |
| Helms | Leo Klier | Notre Dame | Paul Hoffman | Purdue | Wally Hatkevich | Penn State |
| Helms | Bob Kurland | Oklahoma A&M | Ed Koffenberger | Duke | Jack Hewson | Temple |
| Helms | Tony Lavelli | Yale | Don Otten | Bowling Green | Tony Jaros | Minnesota |
| Helms | George Mikan | DePaul | Fred Quinn | Idaho | Bobby Lowther | LSU |
| Helms | Max Morris | Northwestern | Jackie Robinson | Baylor | Garland O'Shields | Tennessee |
| Helms | Jack Parkinson | Kentucky | Herb Wilkinson | Iowa | Red Rocha | Oregon State |
| Helms | Sid Tanenbaum | NYU | Andy Wolfe | California | John Wallace | Indiana |
| Converse | Leo Klier | Notre Dame | John Dillon | North Carolina | Charles B. Black | Kansas |
| Converse | Bob Kurland | Oklahoma A&M | Ed Koffenberger | Duke | Ernie Calverley | Rhode Island |
| Converse | George Mikan | DePaul | Don Otten | Bowling Green | Paul Huston | Ohio State |
| Converse | Max Morris | Northwestern | Ken Sailors | Wyoming | Tony Lavelli | Yale |
| Converse | Jack Parkinson | Kentucky | Rollie Seltz | Hamline | Sid Tanenbaum | NYU |
| True Magazine | Billy Hassett | Notre Dame | Vince Boryla | Notre Dame | Charles B. Black | Kansas |
| True Magazine | Leo Klier | Notre Dame | Harry Boykoff | St. John's | Bill Hall | Marshall |
| True Magazine | Bob Kurland | Oklahoma A&M | Jack Goldsmith | Long Island | Dick Ives | Iowa |
| True Magazine | George Mikan | DePaul | Milo Komenich | Wyoming | Jack Parkinson | Kentucky |
| True Magazine | Ken Sailors | Wyoming | Max Morris | Northwestern | Sid Tanenbaum | NYU |
| Sporting News | John Dillon | North Carolina | Charles B. Black | Kansas | Billy Gabor | Syracuse |
| Sporting News | Bob Kurland | Oklahoma A&M | Wyndol Gray | Harvard | Tony Lavelli | Yale |
| Sporting News | George Mikan | DePaul | Leo Klier | Notre Dame | Red Rocha | Oregon State |
| Sporting News | Max Morris | Northwestern | George Kok | Arkansas | Ken Sailors | Wyoming |
| Sporting News | Sid Tanenbaum | NYU | Herb Wilkinson | Iowa | Jack Tingle | Kentucky |

== See also ==
- 1945–46 NCAA men's basketball season
