= Ike Duffey =

American businessman & sports executive

Personal information
- Born: May 31, 1906 Lagro, Indiana, U.S.
- Died: April 4, 1967 (aged 60) Anderson, Indiana, U.S.

Career history

Coaching
- 1950: Anderson Packers (interim HC)

Isaac Walker Duffey (May 31, 1906 – April 4, 1967) was an American businessman and sports executive known for his significant contributions to the development of professional basketball in the United States. Duffey organized the Anderson Chiefs, a highly successful barnstorming team, and later acquired a National Basketball League franchise, naming it the Anderson Packers. The Packers played in the National Basketball League for three years, winning the final NBL championship, and later spent time in the National Basketball Association and National Professional Basketball League. Duffey was the interim coach of the Packers for three games in the 1949–50 season, going 1–2 before turning the reins over to former NBL coach Doxie Moore.

Duffey and his brother John founded Duffey's Inc., a prominent meatpacking company, and owned the Hughes-Curry Packing Co. of Anderson from 1946 to 1949. Following his venture into basketball, Duffey was president of the Central Indiana Railway from 1951 until his death from cancer in 1967.

Duffey also attended Marion Normal College (now called Ball State University) in the 1920s.

== Head coaching record ==
Legend
Regular season	G	Games coached	W	Games won	L	Games lost	W–L %	Win–loss %
Playoffs	PG	Playoff games	PW	Playoff wins	PL	Playoff losses	PW–L %	Playoff win–loss %

Team	Year	G	W	L	W–L%	Finish	PG	PW	PL	PW–L%	Result
Anderson	1949–50	3	1	2	.333	(replaced)	—	—	—	—	—
