= Frank Gates (basketball) =

American basketball player (1920–1978)

Personal information
- Born: April 12, 1920 Huntsville, Texas, U.S.
- Died: July 26, 1978 (aged 58) Indianapolis, Indiana, U.S.
- Listed height: 6 ft 0 in (1.83 m)
- Listed weight: 160 lb (73 kg)

Career information
- College: Sam Houston State (1937–1941)
- Playing career: 1946–1951
- Position: Guard
- Number: 3

Career history

Playing
- 1946–1947: Fort Wayne Zollner Pistons
- 1947: Anderson Duffey Packers
- 1947: Houston Mavericks
- 1948–1951: Anderson Duffey Packers

Coaching
- 1944–1946: High school(s)
- 1950–1951: Anderson Packers

Career highlights
- NBL champion (1949)
- Stats at NBA.com
- Stats at Basketball Reference

Ben Frank Gates (April 12, 1920 – July 26, 1978) was an American professional basketball player who spent two seasons in the National Basketball League (NBL) and one season in the National Basketball Association (NBA). During the 1946–47 NBL season, Gates played for the Fort Wayne Zollner Pistons and later the Anderson Duffey Packers, who he re-signed with for the 1948–49 season. He attended Sam Houston State University.

== Career statistics ==
Legend
GP	Games played	GS	Games started	MPG	Minutes per game
FG%	Field goal percentage	3P%	3-point field goal percentage	FT%	Free throw percentage
RPG	Rebounds per game	APG	Assists per game	SPG	Steals per game
BPG	Blocks per game	PPG	Points per game	**Bold**	Career high

=== NBA ===
==== Regular season ====
Year	Team	GP	FG%	FT%	APG	PPG
1949–50	Anderson	64	.281	.622	1.4	4.5

==== Playoffs ====
Year	Team	GP	FG%	FT%	APG	PPG
1949–50	Anderson	7	.243	.700	1.3	3.6
