= Murray Mendenhall Jr. =

American basketball player and coach

Personal information
- Born: October 22, 1925 Fort Wayne, Indiana, U.S.
- Died: February 7, 2014 (aged 88) Fort Wayne, Indiana, U.S.
- Listed height: 5 ft 9 in (1.75 m)

Career information
- High school: Central (Fort Wayne, Indiana)
- College: Rice (1944–1945); Indiana (1947–1948)
- BAA draft: 1948: undrafted
- Playing career: 1948–1949
- Position: Guard
- Number: 5

Career history
- 1948–1949: Anderson Packers

Career highlights
- NBL champion (1949)

Murray Joseph Mendenhall Jr. (October 22, 1925 – February 7, 2014) was an American professional basketball player and coach from Fort Wayne, Indiana.

He graduated from Fort Wayne's Central High School in 1944 and enrolled at Rice University playing one season, where he helped the Owls win the 1945 Southwest Conference championship; after a two-year stint in the United States Navy, he enrolled at Indiana University, completing his collegiate eligibility. He was then re-united with his father Murray Mendenhall, playing one season with the Anderson Packers of the National Basketball League. After his playing career ended, he went on to coach at five different high schools and served as athletic director at Indiana Tech. In 1996, Mendenhall Jr was inducted into the Indiana Basketball Hall of Fame.

== Personal life ==
He was the son of Murray Mendenhall, a well-known coach in Indiana. Murray Mendenhall Sr was the first coach of the Fort Wayne Pistons which lasted from 1949 to 1951, and he was also inducted into the Indiana Basketball Hall of Fame. Mendenhall Jr died at the age of 88 in February 2014. He was survived by his wife, Miriam, of 63 years and their three children.
