= Buddy Hassett =

American baseball player (1911-1997)

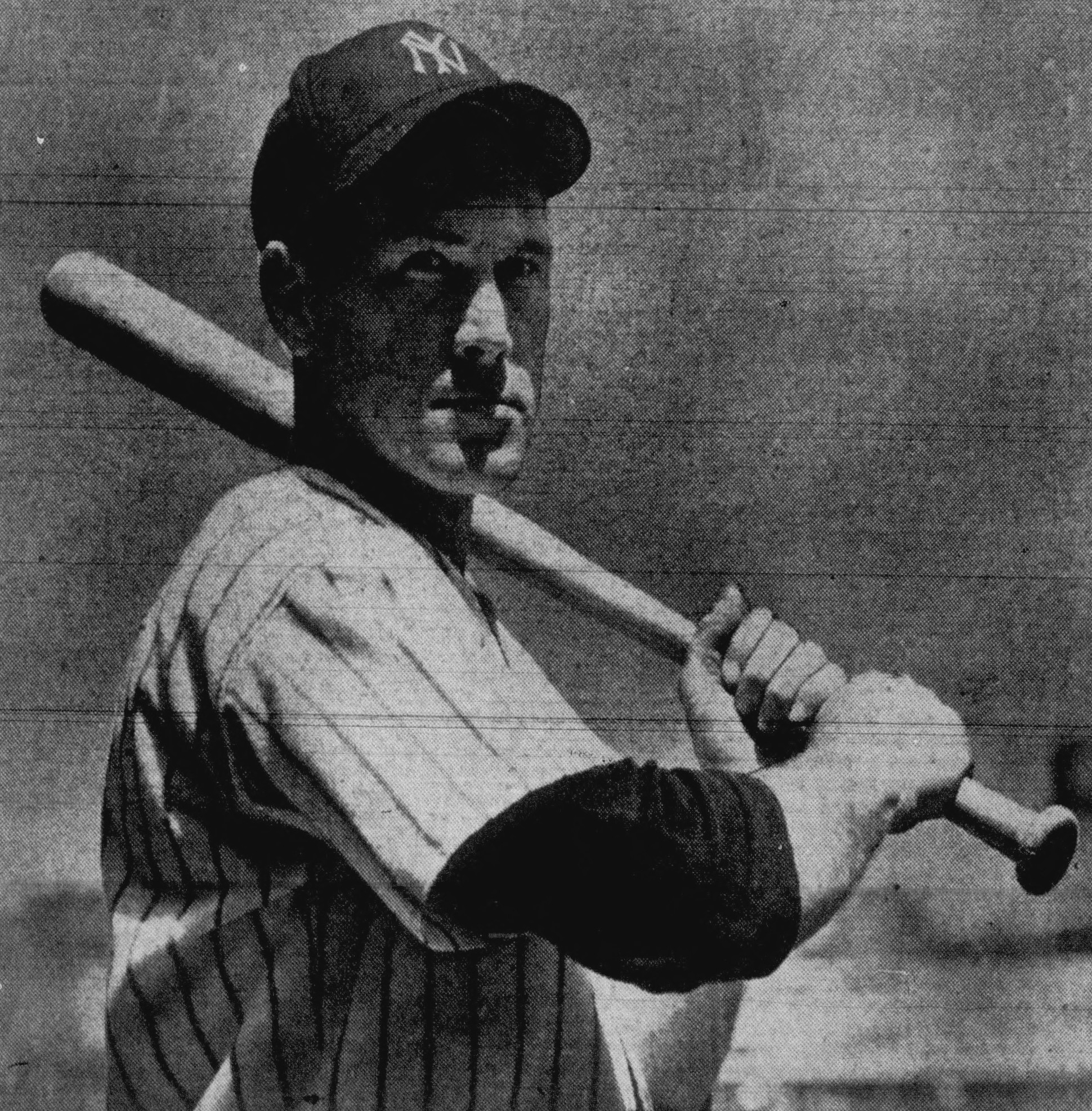
- Hassett, circa 1942
- First baseman
- Born: September 5, 1911; New York, New York, U.S.
- Died: August 23, 1997 (aged 85); Westwood, New Jersey, U.S.
- Batted: Left Threw: Left

MLB debut
- April 14, 1936, for the Brooklyn Dodgers

Last MLB appearance
- September 27, 1942, for the New York Yankees

MLB statistics
- Batting average: .292
- Home runs: 12
- Runs batted in: 343
- Stats at Baseball Reference

Teams
- Brooklyn Dodgers (1936–1938); Boston Bees/Braves (1938–1941); New York Yankees (1942)

John Aloysius "Buddy" Hassett (September 5, 1911 – August 23, 1997) was an American professional baseball first baseman and outfielder. He played in Major League Baseball (MLB) for the Brooklyn Dodgers, Boston Bees / Braves, and New York Yankees.

Hassett started his professional baseball career in 1933 with the Wheeling Stogies and batted .332. In 1934 he played for the Norfolk Tars and hit .360. He also set the league record at the time for stolen bases. In 1935 he played for the Columbus Redbirds and hit .337 in the American Association and won a starting job in the majors for the next seven seasons. His major league career was cut short by World War II. In 1936 he set the record for fewest strikeouts by a rookie. He struck out just 17 times in 635 at bats. According to the Baseball Almanac in 2025 this record still stood.

After serving in the Navy from 1943 to 1945, Hassett played in the minor leagues for a few years. He also managed for the Yankees farm team, the Newark Bears in the minors until 1950. Hassett was player coach of a team of players from the US Navy Pre-flight training program in Chapel Hill, North Carolina that went to New York to play a War Chest benefit against a team of All Stars from the Yankees and Cleveland Indians, coached by Babe Ruth. The Navy team won the game and included Ted Williams, Johnny Sain, and Johnny Pesky along with Hassett. Hassett saw action in the Pacific aboard the Carrier the USS Bennington. His brother, Billy Hassett, was an All American basketball player at Georgetown University and the University of Notre Dame. Billy played professional basketball for the Chicago Gears, the Buffalo Bisons the Tri-City Blackhawks, the Minneapolis Lakers and the Baltimore Bullets (1946–1950).

A resident of Hillsdale, New Jersey, Hassett died at the age of 85 of bone cancer at Pascack Valley Hospital in Westwood, New Jersey.
