= 1948–49 Fort Wayne Pistons season =

First season of the Pistons in the NBA/BAA

- Head coach: Carl Bennett (0–6); Curly Armstrong (22–32)
- Owner: Fred Zollner
- Arena: North Side High School Gym

Results
- Record: 22–38 (.367)
- Place: Division: 5th (Western)
- Playoff finish: Did not qualify
- Stats at Basketball Reference

The 1948–49 BAA season was the first season for the Fort Wayne Pistons in the NBA/BAA and eighth season as a franchise. It was also the first season where the Pistons would not utilize the Zollner name as a part of their franchise due to the Basketball Association of America forbidding companies from utilizing their own organizations as a part of their team name, which Fred Zollner's Zollner Corporation was a part of at the time, meaning the Pistons were forced to remove the Zollner part of their team name officially in order to compete in the BAA/NBA (though they were still referred to as the Zollner Pistons and Zollners unofficially while representing Fort Wayne at the time).

Despite their NBL success, which included four championship series berths and two titles, the team wasn't able to translate that success to the new league and missed the playoffs for the first time in team history. The team was led by center John Mahnken (9.5 ppg) and forward Blackie Towery (7.5 ppg).

== BAA Draft ==
Round	Pick	Player	Position	Nationality	College
1	8	Ward Williams	F	United States	Indiana
2	20	Bobby Cook	G	United States	Wisconsin
3	32	Kenny Rollins	G	United States	Kentucky
4	44	Link Richmond	–	United States	Arizona
5	56	Murray Wier	G	United States	Iowa

Originally, the Pistons (formerly known as the Zollner Pistons, which were named after Fred Zollner and his Zollner Corporation) were one of four teams to participate in what was planned to be a joint draft procedure between the BAA and the rivaling National Basketball League. However, on the very day before the joint draft was set to commence, plans for it were scrapped when the Fort Wayne squad that would since remove the Zollner part of the team name and three other NBL teams (including the defending NBL champion Minneapolis Lakers and runner-up Rochester Royals) decided to leave the NBL for the BAA, meaning they would participate in the 1948 BAA draft this time around instead or either a joint league draft akin to what the National Football League would later do with the future rivaling American Football League during the late 1960s or the 1948 NBL draft that they were originally meant to be a part of. Fort Wayne would end up having the least amount of draft picks for this BAA draft this time around with only five total draft selections at hand. Not only that, but only Ward Williams would end up joining the Fort Wayne Pistons, as both Bobby Cook and Murray Wier would end up going to the rivaling NBL's teams in the Sheboygan Red Skins and the Tri-Cities Blackhawks respectively, while Kenny Rollins would end up getting traded to the Chicago Stags before the season began and Link Richmond never played for the BAA/NBA at all whatsoever.

== Roster ==
1948–49 Fort Wayne Pistons roster
Players

Pos.	No.	Player	Height	Weight	DOB	From
G/F	31	Curly Armstrong	5 ft 11 in (1.80 m)	170 lb (77 kg)	1918-11-01	Indiana
F/C	29	Charles B. Black	6 ft 5 in (1.96 m)	200 lb (91 kg)	1921-06-15	Kansas
PF		Dillard Crocker	6 ft 4 in (1.93 m)	205 lb (93 kg)	1925-01-19	Western Michigan
G/F	35	Bruce Hale	6 ft 1 in (1.85 m)	170 lb (77 kg)	1918-08-30	Santa Clara
G/F	36	Ralph Hamilton	6 ft 1 in (1.85 m)	188 lb (85 kg)	1921-06-10	Indiana
C	30	Bill Henry	6 ft 9 in (2.06 m)	215 lb (98 kg)	1924-12-27	Rice
F/C	32	Bob Kinney	6 ft 6 in (1.98 m)	215 lb (98 kg)	1920-09-16	Rice
PG	35	Walt Kirk	6 ft 3 in (1.91 m)	173 lb (78 kg)	1924-09-03	Illinois
G/F	26	Leo Klier	6 ft 2 in (1.88 m)	170 lb (77 kg)	1923-05-21	Notre Dame
C	24	John Mahnken	6 ft 8 in (2.03 m)	220 lb (100 kg)	1922-06-16	Georgetown
F/C	29	Leo Mogus	6 ft 4 in (1.93 m)	190 lb (86 kg)	1921-04-13	Youngstown State
G/F	23	Richie Niemiera	6 ft 1 in (1.85 m)	165 lb (75 kg)	1921-05-26	Notre Dame
F/C	30	Jake Pelkington	6 ft 6 in (1.98 m)	220 lb (100 kg)	1916-01-03	Manhattan
F/C		Roy Pugh	6 ft 6 in (1.98 m)	210 lb (95 kg)	1922-10-16	SMU
G/F	37	Jack Smiley	6 ft 3 in (1.91 m)	190 lb (86 kg)	1922-12-22	Illinois
G/F	20	Bob Tough	6 ft 0 in (1.83 m)	185 lb (84 kg)	1920-08-28	St. John's
F/C	24	Blackie Towery	6 ft 4 in (1.93 m)	210 lb (95 kg)	1920-06-20	Western Kentucky
G/F	28	Dick Triptow	6 ft 0 in (1.83 m)	170 lb (77 kg)	1922-11-03	DePaul
F	25	Ward Williams	6 ft 4 in (1.93 m)	195 lb (88 kg)	1923-06-26	Indiana

Coaches
Head coach

Curly Armstrong

Legend
- (DP) Unsigned draft pick
- (FA) Free agent
- (S) Suspended
- Injured

Roster

== Regular season ==
=== Season standings ===
#	Western Division				
#	Team	W	L	PCT	GB
1	x-Rochester Royals	45	15	.750	–
2	x-Minneapolis Lakers	44	16	.733	1
3	x-Chicago Stags	38	22	.633	7
4	x-St. Louis Bombers	29	31	.483	16
5	Fort Wayne Pistons	22	38	.367	23
6	Indianapolis Jets	18	42	.300	27

=== Game log ===
#	Date	Opponent	Score	High points	Record
1	November 3	New York	76–80	Jake Pelkington (15)	0–1
2	November 6	@ St. Louis	55–65	Dick Triptow (12)	0–2
3	November 7	Baltimore	77–78	Leo Klier (16)	0–3
4	November 11	@ Providence	87–90	Leo Klier (16)	0–4
5	November 12	@ Boston	75–84	Jack Smiley (21)	0–5
6	November 13	@ Washington	71–80	Carlisle Towery (15)	0–6
7	November 14	Indianapolis	79–73	Walt Kirk (18)	1–6
8	November 17	Philadelphia	80–72	Carlisle Towery (20)	2–6
9	November 21	Chicago	69–70	Bob Tough (14)	2–7
10	November 23	@ Philadelphia	90–80	Pelkington, Tough (16)	3–7
11	November 25	@ Baltimore	64–69	Tough, Towery (14)	3–8
12	November 27	@ New York	70–80	Pelkington, Smiley (12)	3–9
13	November 28	Boston	80–74	Richie Niemiera (19)	4–9
14	November 30	@ Indianapolis	77–62	Dick Triptow (13)	5–9
15	December 1	Minneapolis	84–74	Bob Tough (18)	6–9
16	December 4	@ St. Louis	62–76	Bob Kinney (12)	6–10
17	December 5	Chicago	79–88	Leo Klier (20)	6–11
18	December 8	St. Louis	70–60	Leo Klier (25)	7–11
19	December 10	@ Chicago	70–78	Leo Klier (18)	7–12
20	December 12	New York	78–89	Leo Mogus (22)	7–13
21	December 16	@ Providence	76–61	Klier, Mogus (15)	8–13
22	December 18	@ Rochester	64–84	Leo Mogus (15)	8–14
23	December 19	Rochester	78–83 (OT)	Dick Triptow (13)	8–15
24	December 23	@ Indianapolis	60–71	Curly Armstrong (11)	8–16
25	December 25	@ Washington	74–88	John Mahnken (20)	8–17
26	December 26	Washington	91–73	John Mahnken (16)	9–17
27	January 1	@ Minneapolis	72–92	Klier, Mahnken (16)	9–18
28	January 2	Boston	69–90	Bob Tough (17)	9–19
29	January 8	@ Philadelphia	73–67	John Mahnken (20)	10–19
30	January 9	Indianapolis	80–78	Curly Armstrong (20)	11–19
31	January 15	@ Rochester	62–73	John Mahnken (12)	11–20
32	January 16	Providence	76–56	Bruce Hale (15)	12–20
33	January 19	@ Chicago	104–96 (2OT)	John Mahnken (14)	13–20
34	January 20	@ Minneapolis	65–83	Curly Armstrong (10)	13–21
35	January 23	Rochester	80–81 (OT)	John Mahnken (17)	13–22
36	January 26	Philadelphia	88–80	Leo Mogus (22)	14–22
37	January 28	@ Indianapolis	63–77	Jack Smiley (16)	14–23
38	January 29	@ St. Louis	73–86	Bruce Hale (20)	14–24
39	January 30	Baltimore	78–93	Bruce Hale (26)	14–25
40	February 2	Minneapolis	79–82 (OT)	Curly Armstrong (26)	14–26
41	February 5	@ Rochester	61–80	Hale, Mahnken (11)	14–27
42	February 6	Washington	82–72	Bruce Hale (15)	15–27
43	February 8	vs Philadelphia	89–87	Bill Henry (20)	16–27
44	February 9	Indianapolis	67–70	Bill Henry (17)	16–28
45	February 12	@ New York	58–85	Bruce Hale (12)	16–29
46	February 13	New York	82–73	Richie Niemiera (16)	17–29
47	February 15	@ Chicago	69–83	Curly Armstrong (13)	17–30
48	February 16	Baltimore	84–68	Bill Henry (20)	18–30
49	February 20	St. Louis	64–70	Bruce Hale (18)	18–31
50	February 24	@ Minneapolis	73–77	John Mahnken (21)	18–32
51	February 27	Minneapolis	74–50	Dick Triptow (17)	19–32
52	March 4	@ Boston	70–76	Black, Triptow (12)	19–33
53	March 6	Rochester	66–78	Bill Henry (16)	19–34
54	March 8	vs Boston	60–63	Dick Triptow (11)	19–35
55	March 9	Providence	84–80	Bruce Hale (18)	20–35
56	March 12	@ Washington	60–87	Bruce Hale (10)	20–36
57	March 13	Chicago	81–78	Bruce Hale (16)	21–36
58	March 17	vs Providence	74–72	Bruce Hale (12)	22–36
59	March 19	@ Baltimore	79–99	Bill Henry (17)	22–37
60	March 20	St. Louis	82–87	Bill Henry (16)	22–38
