= Leo Klier =

American basketball player (1923–2005)

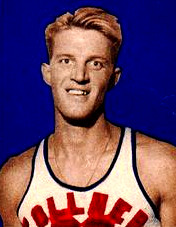
- Klier in 1948

Personal information
- Born: May 21, 1923 Washington, Indiana, U.S.
- Died: June 4, 2005 (aged 82) Naperville, Illinois, U.S.
- Listed height: 6 ft 2 in (1.88 m)
- Listed weight: 170 lb (77 kg)

Career information
- High school: Washington (Washington, Indiana)
- College: Notre Dame (1942–1946)
- Playing career: 1946–1951
- Position: Forward / shooting guard
- Number: 26, 7

Career history

Playing
- 1946–1948: Indianapolis Kautskys
- 1948–1950: Fort Wayne Pistons
- 1950–1951: Anderson Packers

Coaching
- 1950–1951: Anderson Packers

Career highlights
- 2× Consensus first-team All-American (1944, 1946)
- Stats at NBA.com
- Stats at Basketball Reference

Leo Anthony "Crystal" Klier (May 21, 1923 – June 4, 2005) was an American professional basketball player.

== Collegiate career ==
Klier, a 6'2 guard/forward, played collegiately at Notre Dame after a standout high school career at Washington High School in Washington, Indiana. He played for the Fighting Irish from 1942 to 1946. Klier was named a consensus first-team All-American in 1944 as he notched Notre Dame's single-season scoring record (since broken). However, Klier missed the 1944–45 season as he served in the United States Navy during World War II. Klier returned and was again named a consensus first-team All-American in 1946.

He was elected to the Indiana Basketball Hall of Fame in 1977 and was selected to the Notre Dame All-Century basketball team in 2004.

== Professional career ==
Following his collegiate career, Klier played Indianapolis Kautskys of the National Basketball League from 1946 to 1948. During the 1948–49 and 1949–50 seasons, Klier played in 113 games for the Fort Wayne Pistons, averaging 7.4 points per game. He then finished his career with the Anderson Packers for the 1950–51 season.

Klier died on June 4, 2005, in Naperville, Illinois.

== BAA/NBA career statistics ==
Legend
GP	Games played	FG%	Field-goal percentage
FT%	Free-throw percentage	APG	Assists per game
PPG	Points per game	**Bold**	Career high

=== Regular season ===
Year	Team	GP	FG%	FT%	APG	PPG
1948–49	Fort Wayne	47	.254	.708	1.2	**7.4**
1949–50	Fort Wayne	**66**	**.304**	**.742**	**1.8**	6.9
Career		113	.280	.728	1.6	7.1

=== Playoffs ===
Year	Team	GP	FG%	FT%	APG	PPG
1950	Fort Wayne	2	.000	1.000	1.5	.5
Career		2	.000	1.000	1.5	.5
