= Milo Komenich =

American basketball player (1920–1977)

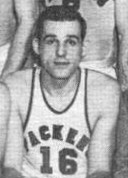
- Komenich, c. 1948

Personal information
- Born: June 22, 1920 Gary, Indiana, U.S.
- Died: May 25, 1977 (aged 56) Manteca, California, U.S.
- Listed height: 6 ft 7 in (2.01 m)
- Listed weight: 212 lb (96 kg)

Career information
- High school: Lew Wallace (Gary, Indiana)
- College: Wyoming (1941–1943, 1945–1946)
- Playing career: 1946–1950
- Position: Power forward / center

Career history
- 1946–1947: Fort Wayne Zollner Pistons
- 1947–1948: Anderson Duffey Packers
- 1948: Fort Wayne Zollner Pistons
- 1948–1950: Anderson Duffey Packers

Career highlights
- NBL champion (1949); NCAA champion (1943); Second-team All-American – True (1946)
- Stats at NBA.com
- Stats at Basketball Reference

Milan Melvin "Milo" Komenich (June 22, 1920 – May 25, 1977) was an American professional basketball player. His brother was fellow professional basketball player Bill Komenich.

== Collegiate career ==
Born in Gary, Indiana, he was the son of Serbian immigrants. Komenich, a 6'7 center, played collegiately at the University of Wyoming after a standout high school career at Lew Wallace High School in Gary, Indiana. He played for the Cowboys from 1941 to 1943 and for the 1945–46 season. Alongside guard Ken Sailors, Komenich led the Cowboys to the 1943 National Championship.

Komenich was named an All-American in 1943 and 1946. He was elected to the University of Wyoming athletics Hall of Fame in 2006 and is also a member of the Indiana Basketball Hall of Fame.

== Professional career ==
During the 1949–50 season, Milo Komenich played in 64 games for the Anderson Packers, averaging 9.9 points per game. Komenich also played for the Fort Wayne Pistons of the National Basketball League and the Dow Chemical and 20th Century Fox teams of the AAU.

== Career statistics ==
Legend
GP	Games played	GS	Games started	MPG	Minutes per game
FG%	Field goal percentage	3P%	3-point field goal percentage	FT%	Free throw percentage
RPG	Rebounds per game	APG	Assists per game	SPG	Steals per game
BPG	Blocks per game	PPG	Points per game	**Bold**	Career high

=== NBA ===
==== Regular season ====
Year	Team	GP	FG%	FT%	APG	PPG
1949–50	Anderson	64	.283	.584	1.9	9.9

==== Playoffs ====
Year	Team	GP	FG%	FT%	APG	PPG
1950	Anderson	8	.243	.571	1.8	8.5
