= 1949–50 Fort Wayne Pistons season =

NBA team season

- Head coach: Murray Mendenhall
- Owner: Fred Zollner
- Arena: North Side High School Gym

Results
- Record: 40–28 (.588)
- Place: Division: 3rd (Central)
- Playoff finish: Central Division Finals (eliminated 0–2)
- Stats at Basketball Reference
- Radio: WOWO

The 1949–50 NBA season was the second season for the Fort Wayne Pistons in the National Basketball Association (NBA), and ninth overall as a franchise.

After missing the playoffs for the first time in 1949 the franchise made their first NBA playoff berth, starting a streak of 14 straight post-season berths. After beating the Chicago Stags 86–69 in a tiebreaker game, the Pistons entered the playoffs as the three seed in the east and defeated their old rivals, the Rochester Royals, in a first round sweep, before the Pistons got swept by the eventual champion Minneapolis Lakers. Fort Wayne was led by Indiana basketball legend point guard Curly Armstrong (7.3 ppg, 2.8 apg) and rookie forward Fred Schaus (14.3 ppg).

== BAA/NBA Draft ==
Round	Pick	Player	Position	Nationality	School/club team
1	3	Bob Harris	F/C	United States	Oklahoma State
2	–	John Oldham	G	United States	Western Kentucky
3	–	Fred Schaus	F	United States	West Virginia
4	–	Jerry Nagel	G	United States	Loyola Chicago

== Roster ==
1949–50 Fort Wayne Pistons roster
Players

Pos.	No.	Player	Height	Weight	DOB	From
G/F	3	Curly Armstrong	5 ft 11 in (1.80 m)	170 lb (77 kg)	1918-11-01	Indiana
F/C	12	Charles B. Black	6 ft 5 in (1.96 m)	200 lb (91 kg)	1921-06-15	Kansas
F/C	10	Bob Carpenter	6 ft 5 in (1.96 m)	200 lb (91 kg)	1917-11-06	East Texas A&M
F/C	14	Bob Harris	6 ft 7 in (2.01 m)	195 lb (88 kg)	1927-03-16	Oklahoma State
C	16	Bill Henry	6 ft 9 in (2.06 m)	215 lb (98 kg)	1924-12-27	Rice
G	5	Boag Johnson	5 ft 11 in (1.80 m)	170 lb (77 kg)	1921-12-06	Huntington
F/C	15	Jack Kerris	6 ft 6 in (1.98 m)	215 lb (98 kg)	1925-01-30	Loyola Chicago
G/F	7	Leo Klier	6 ft 2 in (1.88 m)	170 lb (77 kg)	1923-05-21	Notre Dame
G	6	Duane Klueh	6 ft 3 in (1.91 m)	175 lb (79 kg)	1926-01-06	Indiana State
C	15	John Mahnken	6 ft 8 in (2.03 m)	220 lb (100 kg)	1922-06-16	Georgetown
G	9	Jerry Nagel	6 ft 0 in (1.83 m)	190 lb (86 kg)	1928-05-18	Loyola Chicago
G/F	5	Richie Niemiera	6 ft 1 in (1.85 m)	165 lb (75 kg)	1921-05-26	Notre Dame
G	4	John Oldham	6 ft 3 in (1.91 m)	175 lb (79 kg)	1923-06-22	Western Kentucky
F	8	Fred Schaus	6 ft 5 in (1.96 m)	205 lb (93 kg)	1925-06-30	West Virginia
F/C	12	Howie Schultz	6 ft 6 in (1.98 m)	200 lb (91 kg)	1922-07-03	Hamline
F/C	17	Clint Wager	6 ft 6 in (1.98 m)	210 lb (95 kg)	1920-01-20	Saint Mary's (MN)

Coaches
Head coach
- Murray Mendenhall

Legend
- (DP) Unsigned draft pick
- (FA) Free agent
- (S) Suspended
- Injured

== Regular season ==
=== Season standings ===
Central Division	W	L	PCT	GB	Home	Road	Neutral	Div
x-Minneapolis Lakers	51	17	.750	–	30–1	18–16	3–0	16–8
x-Rochester Royals	51	17	.750	–	33–1	17–16	1–0	15–9
x-Fort Wayne Pistons	40	28	.588	11	28–6	12–22	–	14–10
x-Chicago Stags	40	28	.588	11	18–6	14–21	8–1	11–13
St. Louis Bombers	26	42	.382	25	17–14	7–26	2–2	4–20

=== Game log ===
1949–50 game log
#	Date	Opponent	Score	High points	Record
1	November 3	New York	87–72	John Oldham (15)	1–0
2	November 6	Chicago	87–70	Fred Schaus (21)	2–0
3	November 10	Waterloo	89–59	Armstrong, Schaus (14)	3–0
4	November 12	at Baltimore	75–82	Bob Carpenter (19)	3–1
5	November 13	Denver	90–71	Fred Schaus (19)	4–1
6	November 16	at Chicago	72–85	Charles Black (12)	4–2
7	November 19	at Tri-Cities	88–85	Charles Black (16)	5–2
8	November 20	Boston	99–89	John Oldham (20)	6–2
9	November 24	at Boston	99–85	Fred Schaus (28)	7–2
10	November 26	at Washington	76–93	Fred Schaus (15)	7–3
11	November 27	New York	72–77	Leo Klier (23)	7–4
12	November 30	at Waterloo	71–95	Charles Black (14)	7–5
13	December 1	Philadelphia	74–70	Fred Schaus (16)	8–5
14	December 4	Washington	72–68	Fred Schaus (22)	9–5
15	December 8	Minneapolis	87–66	Fred Schaus (26)	10–5
16	December 10	at Washington	69–75	Fred Schaus (19)	10–6
17	December 11	Indianapolis	90–74	Charles Black (24)	11–6
18	December 12	at Anderson	97–105	Fred Schaus (23)	11–7
19	December 14	at Syracuse	83–96	Jack Kerris (17)	11–8
20	December 15	Rochester	69–66	Bob Carpenter (16)	12–8
21	December 18	Baltimore	106–95	Bob Carpenter (22)	13–8
22	December 22	St. Louis	87–75	Fred Schaus (20)	14–8
23	December 25	at Minneapolis	58–72	Charles Black (13)	14–9
24	December 26	Chicago	76–74	Fred Schaus (24)	15–9
25	December 28	Tri-Cities	81–75 (OT)	Leo Klier (14)	16–9
26	December 29	at Rochester	79–97	Bob Carpenter (14)	16–10
27	December 30	at Boston	73–92	Fred Schaus (16)	16–11
28	December 31	at Philadelphia	65–62	Fred Schaus (14)	17–11
29	January 1	Boston	80–72	Curly Armstrong (17)	18–11
30	January 4	at Minneapolis	75–91	Fred Schaus (16)	18–12
31	January 5	St. Louis	87–83	Bob Carpenter (18)	19–12
32	January 7	at New York	88–80	Curly Armstrong (16)	20–12
33	January 8	Sheboygan	83–69	Charles Black (15)	21–12
34	January 12	Syracuse	62–64	Charles Black (12)	21–13
35	January 15	Philadelphia	81–67	Bob Harris (17)	22–13
36	January 18	at Sheboygan	73–72	Fred Schaus (15)	23–13
37	January 19	at St. Louis	64–74	Bob Carpenter (17)	23–14
38	January 21	at Indianapolis	94–112	Fred Schaus (19)	23–15
39	January 22	Washington	82–70	Bob Carpenter (14)	24–15
40	January 24	at Philadelphia	74–87	Fred Schaus (15)	24–16
41	January 25	at New York	66–96	Fred Schaus (17)	24–17
42	January 26	at Boston	68–89	Fred Schaus (14)	24–18
43	January 28	at Baltimore	64–77	Bob Carpenter (12)	24–19
44	January 29	New York	92–70	Fred Schaus (29)	25–19
45	January 31	at Chicago	93–89	Howie Schultz (18)	26–19
46	February 2	Minneapolis	78–79	Bob Harris (16)	26–20
47	February 5	Anderson	95–85	Fred Schaus (22)	27–20
48	February 7	at Denver	83–67	Fred Schaus (20)	28–20
49	February 9	Philadelphia	61–64	Fred Schaus (13)	28–21
50	February 11	at Rochester	92–84	Bob Carpenter (16)	29–21
51	February 12	Rochester	76–74	Johnson, Kerris (16)	30–21
52	February 15	Boston	84–78	Duane Klueh (16)	31–21
53	February 16	at Baltimore	77–83	Fred Schaus (15)	31–22
54	February 17	at Philadelphia	68–67	Fred Schaus (16)	32–22
55	February 18	at New York	84–80	Jack Kerris (13)	33–22
56	February 19	Baltimore	79–71	Jack Kerris (21)	34–22
57	February 23	at St. Louis	74–72	Fred Schaus (17)	35–22
58	February 26	Washington	78–81	Red Rocha (15)	35–23
59	February 28	at Minneapolis	65–71	Fred Schaus (14)	35–24
60	March 1	at St. Louis	75–70	Bob Carpenter (18)	36–24
61	March 2	St. Louis	91–61	Duane Klueh (21)	37–24
62	March 4	at Rochester	70–73	Curly Armstrong (16)	37–25
63	March 5	Rochester	60–65	Fred Schaus (13)	37–26
64	March 9	Chicago	84–71	Duane Klueh (18)	38–26
65	March 11	at Chicago	88–90	Fred Schaus (23)	38–27
66	March 12	Baltimore	86–75	Bob Carpenter (25)	39–27
67	March 18	at Washington	76–82	Fred Schaus (16)	39–28
68	March 19	Minneapolis	69–67	Bob Carpenter (12)	40–28

== Playoffs ==
1950 playoff game log
Division Tiebreaker (finished as Central's #3 seed)

Game	Date	Team	Score	High points	High assists	Location Attendance	Record
1	March 20	Chicago	W 86–69	Fred Schaus (18)	Fred Schaus (6)	North Side High School Gym	1–0

Division Semifinals: 2–0 (home: 1–0; road: 1–0)

Game	Date	Team	Score	High points	Location	Series
1	March 23	@ Rochester	W 90–84	Wager, Schaefer (18)	Edgerton Park Arena	1–0
2	March 24	Rochester	W 79–78 (OT)	Bob Carpenter (27)	North Side High School Gym	2–0

Division Finals: 0–2 (home: 0–1; road: 0–1)

Game	Date	Team	Score	High points	High assists	Location	Series
1	March 27	@ Minneapolis	L 79–93	Fred Schaus (20)	Fred Schaus (4)	Minneapolis Auditorium	0–1
2	March 28	Minneapolis	L 82–89	Fred Schaus (33)	—	North Side High School Gym	0–2

1950 schedule

== Awards and records ==
- Fred Schaus, All-NBA Second Team
