= Frank Brian =

American basketball player

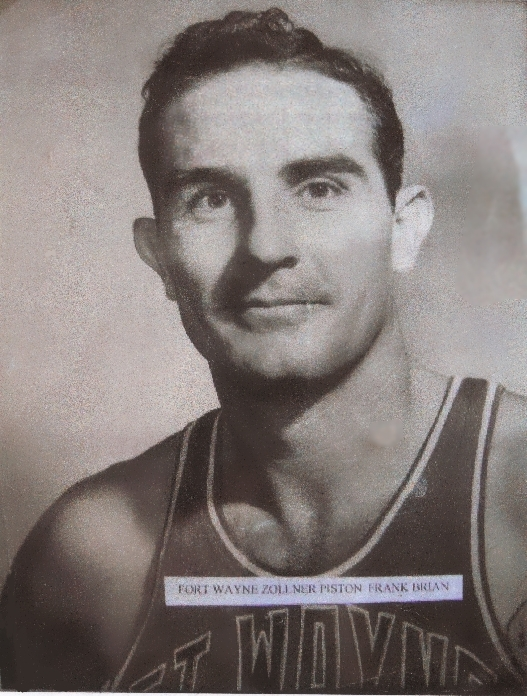

Personal information
- Born: May 1, 1923 Zachary, Louisiana, U.S.
- Died: May 14, 2017 (aged 94) Zachary, Louisiana, U.S.
- Listed height: 6 ft 1 in (1.85 m)
- Listed weight: 180 lb (82 kg)

Career information
- High school: Zachary (Zachary, Louisiana)
- College: LSU (1942–1943, 1945–1947)
- Playing career: 1947–1956
- Position: Point guard / shooting guard
- Number: 8, 13, 7

Career history
- 1947–1950: Anderson (Duffey) Packers
- 1950–1951: Tri-Cities Blackhawks
- 1951–1956: Fort Wayne Pistons

Career highlights
- 2× NBA All-Star (1951, 1952); 2× All-NBA Second Team (1950, 1951); NBL champion (1949); All-NBL First Team (1949); All-NBL Second Team (1948)

Career NBA statistics
- Points: 5,379
- Rebounds: 903
- Assists: 1,138
- Stats at NBA.com
- Stats at Basketball Reference

Frank Sands Brian (May 1, 1923 – May 14, 2017) was an American professional basketball player.

== Life and career ==
Brian was the third cousin of fellow NBA player Bob Pettit. Despite being a first round draft pick, Pettit was initially reluctant to play in the NBA until Brian successfully persuaded him to do so.

A 6’1" guard from Louisiana State University, Brian signed with the Anderson Packers of the National Basketball League in 1947. In 1949 the NBL and BAA merged to form the NBA. He scored 2,442 points in three seasons with the Packers, then joined the Chicago Stags of the NBA when the Packers franchise folded following the 1949–1950 season. The Stags quickly traded Brian to the Tri-Cities Blackhawks, whom Brian represented as an NBA All-Star in 1951.

Brian also earned All-NBA Second Teams honors in 1951 after averaging 16.8 points, 3.9 assists and 3.6 rebounds. Frank Led Tri-Cities Blackhawks (now "Atlanta Hawks") in scoring in 1951.Frank was 5th in the League with his 1,144 points for the Blackhawks during 1951–1952 season. In May 1951, the Blackhawks traded Brian to the Fort Wayne Pistons for Howie Schultz and Dick Mehen. Frank led Ft. Wayne Pistons (now "Detroit Pistons") in scoring in 1952 & 1953, ranking 6th in the league with 1,051 points during the 1951–52 season. Brian had five productive seasons with the Pistons, who went to the NBA Championships in 1955 and 1956, and he retired in 1956 with 6,663 combined NBL/NBA career points.

- Basketball All-American at LSU and 2-time All-Southeast Conference.
- National All-AAU Basketball Team.
- National Basketball League All-Rookie (1947)
- 2-Time NBL All-Star (1948,1949)
- Nicknamed "Flash" for being one of the League's fastest players.
- NBA Basketball Pioneer...played in first 7 seasons of NBA history (1949–1956)
- Played in first two NBA All-Star games (1951,1952)
- All-NBA (1950,1951)
- Led Tri-Cities Blackhawks (now "Atlanta Hawks") in scoring in 1951.
- Was 5th in the League with his 1,144 points for the Blackhawks during 1951–1952 season.
- Ranked 6th in the league with 1,051 points during the 1951–52 season with the Fort Wayne Pistons.
- Led Ft. Wayne Pistons (now "Detroit Pistons") in scoring in 1952 & 1953.
- Ranked in Top-6 in NBA in scoring for 3 consecutive seasons (1950,1951,1952)
- Led NBA in Games Played in 1952 (66)
- 2nd Best Free Throw Percentage in NBA in 1955 (85.1%)
- Played in 1955 and 1956 NBA Championships.
- Played in first NBA Championship Series of the Shot Clock Era (1955)
- Scored 6,663 points in 10-year professional career.
- Inducted into the Louisiana Sports Hall of Fame in 1986.
- Inducted into the LSU Hall of Fame on September 13, 2013.

Brian died on May 14, 2017, in Zachary, Louisiana, aged 94.

== NBA career statistics ==
Legend
GP	Games played	GS	Games started	MPG	Minutes per game
FG%	Field goal percentage	3P%	3-point field goal percentage	FT%	Free throw percentage
RPG	Rebounds per game	APG	Assists per game	SPG	Steals per game
BPG	Blocks per game	PPG	Points per game	**Bold**	Career high

=== Regular season ===
Year	Team	GP	MPG	FG%	FT%	RPG	APG	PPG
1949–50	Anderson	64	–	.318	.824	–	3.0	**17.8**
1950–51	Tri-Cities	68	–	.322	.823	**3.6**	**3.9**	16.8
1951–52	Fort Wayne	66	40.5	.352	.848	3.5	3.5	15.9
1952–53	Fort Wayne	68	28.1	.351	.795	2.0	2.1	10.7
1953–54	Fort Wayne	64	15.2	.375	.753	1.2	1.4	6.3
1954–55	Fort Wayne	**71**	19.5	**.380**	**.851**	1.8	2.0	9.7
1955–56	Fort Wayne	37	18.4	.297	.818	2.4	2.0	6.2
Career		438	24.9	.340	.821	2.4	2.6	12.3
All-Star		2	–	.375	.818	6.5	3.5	13.5

=== Playoffs ===
Year	Team	GP	MPG	FG%	FT%	RPG	APG	PPG
1950	Anderson	8	–	.271	**.896**	–	2.4	**11.9**
1952	Fort Wayne	2	**40.5**	.250	.833	**3.0**	**4.5**	8.5
1953	Fort Wayne	8	18.3	.310	.760	1.1	1.4	5.6
1954	Fort Wayne	4	26.5	**.417**	.688	**3.0**	2.5	10.3
1955	Fort Wayne	**11**	24.5	.400	.816	2.0	2.5	11.5
1956	Fort Wayne	10	16.6	.382	.810	1.2	1.7	6.9
Career		43	21.9	.347	.818	1.7	2.2	9.2
