= John Hargis (basketball) =

American basketball player

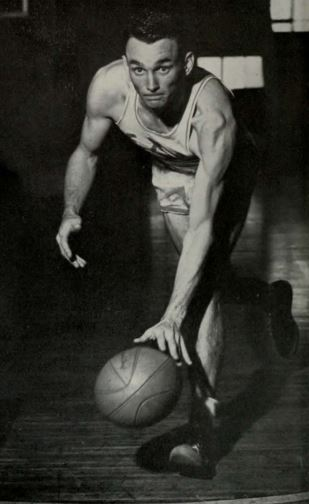
- Hargis from the 1947 Cactus

Personal information
- Born: August 20, 1920 Nacogdoches, Texas, U.S.
- Died: January 2, 1986 (aged 65)
- Listed height: 6 ft 2 in (1.88 m)
- Listed weight: 180 lb (82 kg)

Career information
- High school: Nacogdoches (Nacogdoches, Texas)
- College: Texas (1941–1943, 1946–1947)
- NBA draft: 1947: undrafted
- Playing career: 1947–1951
- Position: Guard / forward
- Number: 6, 9, 14

Career history
- 1947–1950: Anderson (Duffey) Packers
- 1950: Fort Wayne Pistons
- 1950–1951: Tri-Cities Blackhawks

Career highlights
- NBL champion (1949); Consensus second-team All-American (1947); 2× All-SWC (1943, 1947)

Career NBA statistics
- Points: 766^{[a]}
- Rebounds: 66^{[a]}
- Assists: 127^{[a]}
- Stats at NBA.com
- Stats at Basketball Reference

John Arlington "Shotgun" Hargis (August 20, 1920 – January 2, 1986) was an American professional basketball player, first in the National Basketball League (NBL) and then in the National Basketball Association (NBA). He was born in Nacogdoches, Texas and attended Nacogdoches High School.

Hargis enrolled in the University of Texas at Austin in the early 1940s and played college basketball there. In both 1942–43 and 1946–47, he led the Longhorns to the NCAA Final Four, where they would lose to eventual national champion Wyoming and win the third-place game over CCNY, respectively. In each of those two seasons he was named All-Southwest Conference and, in 1947, a consensus Second Team All-American. After the 1943 season, Hargis enlisted in the United States military and fought in World War II for three years, then returned to Austin to finish college in 1947.

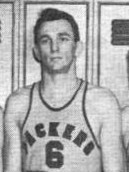
Hargis with the Packers in 1947.

After school, Hargis played for the Anderson Packers for three seasons, then split time between the Fort Wayne Pistons and Tri-Cities Blackhawks during his fourth and final year as a professional. For the first two years, the Packers were a member of the NBL. In 1949–50, however, they merged into the NBA. As a rookie in 1947–48, Hargis was second on the team in scoring (642 points; 10.9 ppg). In his second season, he scored 444 points (7.8 ppg), and then in his final season with the Packers, Hargis averaged 10.7 ppg while scoring 643 points. In addition to moderate personal success, the Packers also won the NBL championship in Hargis' second year on the team.

In April 1948, Hargis played in final edition of the World Professional Basketball Tournament with the Packers (team finished in third place) and earned "second all-tournament team" honour after scoring 34 points in 3 games.

In April 1950, Hargis was drafted by the Fort Wayne Pistons from the Anderson Packers in a dispersal draft because their franchise had folded. After only playing in a handful of games for the Pistons, he was sold in December 1950 to the Tri-Cities Blackhawks. Hargis finished out the rest of the season with them but was not re-signed to any team and never played professionally again.

== Career statistics ==
Legend
GP	Games played	GS	Games started	MPG	Minutes per game
FG%	Field goal percentage	3P%	3-point field goal percentage	FT%	Free throw percentage
RPG	Rebounds per game	APG	Assists per game	SPG	Steals per game
BPG	Blocks per game	PPG	Points per game	**Bold**	Career high

=== NBA ===
==== Regular season ====
Year	Team	GP	FG%	FT%	RPG	APG	PPG
1949–50	Anderson	**60**	**.405**	**.711**	–	**1.7**	**10.7**
1950–51	Fort Wayne	14	.379	.708	2.1	.6	4.8
1950–51	Tri-Cities	15	.377	.556	**2.4**	1.1	3.7
Career		89	.400	.702	2.3	1.4	8.6

==== Playoffs ====
Year	Team	GP	FG%	FT%	APG	PPG
1950	Anderson	8	.360	.745	1.6	12.4

== Notes ==
- **^{a}** Hargis' statistical totals only account for his two seasons in the NBA. They do not include his two years in the NBL.
