= Murray Mendenhall =

American basketball coach (1898–1972)

Personal information
- Born: March 5, 1898 Amo, Indiana U.S.
- Died: July 27, 1972 (aged 74)

Career information
- College: DePauw (1919–1922)

Career history

Coaching
- 1923: New Castle High School
- 1924–1945: Fort Wayne Central High School
- 1946–1949: Anderson Packers
- 1949–1951: Fort Wayne Pistons

Career highlights
- As coach: NBL champion (1949); NBL Coach of the Year (1948)

Murray Joseph Mendenhall (March 5, 1898 – July 27, 1972) was an American basketball coach. Murray began coaching at the high school level, at New Castle in 1923, before moving to Ft. Wayne Central the following year, coaching the Tigers to the state championship in 1943. He also coached in the National Basketball Association (NBA) from 1949 to 1951 as the first coach of the Fort Wayne Pistons, and has been inducted into the Indiana Basketball Hall of Fame. Prior to coaching the Pistons, he coached the now-defunct Anderson Packers of the National Basketball League.

His son, Murray Jr. played for him on the 1943 championship team, before being inducted into the United States Navy. Both Murray, Jr. and his son, Murray Mendenhall, III, coached high school basketball in Indiana.

== Head coaching record ==
=== NBA ===
Legend
Regular season	G	Games coached	W	Games won	L	Games lost	W–L %	Win–loss %
Playoffs	PG	Playoff games	PW	Playoff wins	PL	Playoff losses	PW–L %	Playoff win–loss %

Team	Year	G	W	L	W–L%	Finish	PG	PW	PL	PW–L%	Result
Fort Wayne	1949–50	68	40	28	.588	3rd in Central	4	2	2	.500	Lost in Division finals
Fort Wayne	1950–51	68	32	36	.471	3rd in Western	3	1	2	.333	List in Division semifinals
Career		136	72	64	.529		7	3	4	.429	
