= Billy Hassett =

American basketball player (1921–1992)

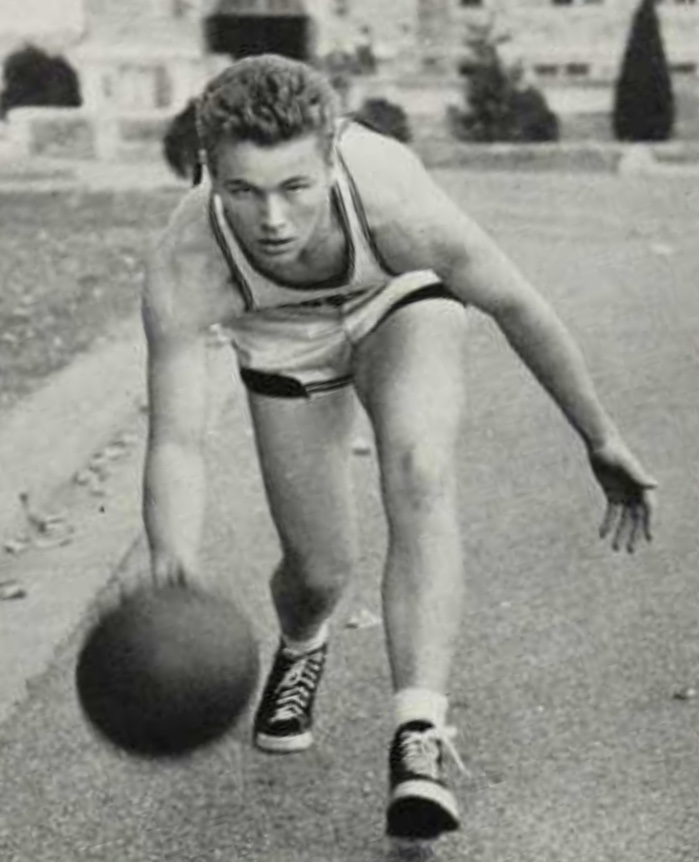
- Hassett from the 1943 Domesday Booke

Personal information
- Born: October 21, 1921 New York City, New York, U.S.
- Died: November 15, 1992 (aged 71)
- Listed height: 5 ft 11 in (1.80 m)
- Listed weight: 185 lb (84 kg)

Career information
- High school: La Salle Academy (New York City, New York)
- College: Georgetown (1942–1943); Notre Dame (1944–1946)
- Playing career: 1946–1951
- Position: Point guard
- Number: 8, 11

Career history
- 1946–1947: Buffalo Bisons / Tri-Cities Blackhawks
- 1947: Chicago American Gears
- 1947–1949: Tri-Cities Blackhawks
- 1949–1950: Minneapolis Lakers
- 1950–1951: Baltimore Bullets

Career highlights
- NBA champion (1950); Consensus first-team All-American (1945); Consensus second-team All-American (1946)
- Stats at NBA.com
- Stats at Basketball Reference

William Joseph Hassett (October 21, 1921 – November 15, 1992) was an American professional basketball player.

A 5'11" guard from the University of Notre Dame, where he also lettered in baseball, he was a consensus first team All American selection in 1945 and a second team selection in 1946. Hassett played five seasons (1946–51) in the National Basketball League, the Professional Basketball League of America, and the National Basketball Association as a member of the Buffalo Bisons / Tri-Cities Blackhawks (with Hassett notably being one of eight players from the original Buffalo Bisons NBL team from 1946 that ended up moving from Buffalo, New York to Moline, Illinois as a part of what was called the "Tri-Cities" area at the time to become the Tri-Cities Blackhawks that became the present-day Atlanta Hawks), the Chicago American Gears, the Minneapolis Lakers, and the Baltimore Bullets. He averaged 4.5 points per game professionally in the NBA. He won an NBA championship with the Lakers in 1950 with teammate George Mikan.

Billy was the leading scorer for the Blackhawks with 15 points in the first game in history of the NBA as a member of the Tri-Cities Blackhawks. Bob Brown on the Nuggets led all scorers with 16 points. The game was played on October 29, 1949, against to old Denver Nuggets.

Hassett also played one year for the Georgetown Hoyas in 1942–43 (All American selection), playing in the NCAA Championship against Wyoming in 1943. Hassett played for the AAU Dow Chemics in 1944 after Georgetown dropped basketball due to World War II. He transferred to Notre Dame in 1945. Hassett managed the 24 second clock the first time it was used in the NBA at a Syracuse Nationals game. His brother, John Aloysious "Buddy" Hassett, played Major League Baseball for the Brooklyn Dodgers, the Boston Bees and Braves and the New York Yankees (1936–1942).

== Career statistics ==
Legend
GP	Games played	FGM	Field-goals made
FG%	Field-goal percentage	FTM	Free-throws made
FTA	Free-throws attempted	FT%	Free-throw percentage
RPG	Rebounds per game	APG	Assists per game
PTS	Points	PPG	Points per game
**Bold**	Career high

=== NBL ===
==== Regular season ====
Year	Team	GP	FGM	FTM	FTA	FT%	PTS	PPG
1946–47	Buffalo / Tri-Cities	27	73	66	101	.653	212	7.9
1947–48	Tri-Cities	56	**199**	**203**	**269**	**.755**	**601**	**10.7**
1948–49	Tri-Cities	**64**	125	106	156	.679	356	5.6
Career		147	397	375	526	.713	1,169	8.0

==== Playoffs ====
Year	Team	GP	FGM	FTM	FTA	FT%	PTS	PPG
1948	Tri-Cities	**6**	**18**	**17**	**26**	.654	**53**	**8.8**
1949	Tri-Cities	5	11	**17**	21	**.810**	39	7.8
Career		11	29	34	47	.723	92	8.4

=== NBA ===
==== Regular season ====
Year	Team	GP	FG%	FT%	RPG	APG	PPG
1949–50	Tri-Cities	18	**.293**	**.734**	–	**3.8**	**8.9**
1949–50†	Minneapolis	**42**	.262	.522	–	1.6	2.6
1950–51	Baltimore	31	.281	.683	1.1	1.5	4.3
Career		91	.279	.656	1.1	2.0	4.5

==== Playoffs ====
Year	Team	GP	FG%	FT%	APG	PPG
1950†	Philadelphia	7	.250	.300	.6	1.3
