= Charles B. Black =

American basketball player

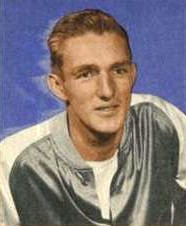
- Black in 1948

Personal information
- Born: June 15, 1921 Arco, Idaho, U.S.
- Died: December 22, 1992 (aged 71) Rogers, Arkansas, U.S.
- Listed height: 6 ft 5 in (1.96 m)
- Listed weight: 200 lb (91 kg)

Career information
- High school: Southwest (Kansas City, Missouri)
- College: Kansas (1941–1943, 1945–1947)
- BAA draft: 1947: undrafted
- Playing career: 1947–1952
- Position: Forward / center
- Number: 44, 29, 12, 7, 21

Career history
- 1947–1948: Anderson Duffey Packers
- 1948–1949: Indianapolis Jets
- 1949–1950: Fort Wayne Pistons
- 1950–1951: Anderson Packers
- 1951–1952: Milwaukee Hawks

Career highlights
- 2× Consensus first-team All-American (1943, 1946); Second-team All-American – Helms (1947); 3× First-team All-Big Six (1942, 1946, 1947); No. 10 retired by Kansas Jayhawks
- Stats at NBA.com
- Stats at Basketball Reference

Charles Bradford Black Jr. (June 15, 1921 – December 22, 1992) was an American professional basketball player and a four-time All-American at the University of Kansas. Black was also a decorated war hero.

== College career (1941–1943, 1945–1947) ==
Born in Arco, Idaho, Black graduated from Southwest High School in Kansas City, Missouri in 1940.

Black first attended the University of Wisconsin, as a freshman. studying agriculture, before he moved back to Kansas City. He then played collegiately as a forward for the University of Kansas under Coach Phog Allen. He played from 1941 to 1943 before enlisting in the military during WWII and returned to play for Kansas from 1945 to 1947. In his first season, Black led Kansas to a 17–5 season (11.1 points per game) and in his second season (11.3 points), alongside Ray Evans, Black led Kansas to their fourth-consecutive Big Six Conference Championship and a 22–6 record. At Kansas, he was a two-time consensus first-team All-American and a four time All-American.

After his military service, Black averaged 16.3 points playing alongside Otto Schnellbacher, as Kansas finished 19–2. Black earned his third All-American honor, and also led the Big Six conference in scoring. Black's senior year. Kansas finished 16–11 record, with Black averaging 11.3 points.

Black was the first player in KU history to score 1,000 career points (he finished with 1,082). He was a member of three Big 6 Conference championship teams (alongside two-time All-American guard Ray Evans, and four-time all-conference forward Otto Schnellbacher). The 1943 team is regarded as one of the greatest in KU's history.

In his career at Kansas, Black played in 87 games, averaging 12.4 points per game.

== Professional career (1947–1952) ==
He played for the Indianapolis Jets (1948–49), Fort Wayne Pistons (1949–50), Anderson Packers (1949–50) and Milwaukee Hawks (1950–52) in the NBA for 136 games.

In his NBA career he averaged 9.2 points, 2.4 assists and 2.3 rebounds in 136 games from 1948 to 1952.

== War hero ==
Black flew 51 flying missions over Nazi occupied Europe during World War II, as a P-38 reconnaissance pilot. He was awarded the Distinguished Flying Cross.

== Personal ==
Black worked as a farmer in Kansas and at a welding company, before retiring to Rogers, Arkansas in 1984. He died on December 22, 1992, at the age of 71 and was present to see his number retired by Kansas shortly before his death.

== Honors ==
- Black was inducted into the Kansas Sports Hall of Fame in 2004.
- In honor of his memory, the Kansas Jayhawks locker room at Allen Fieldhouse is named after Black.
- Black's #10 jersey was retired by Kansas in 1992 and hangs in Allen Fieldhouse, named for his coach.

== BAA/NBA career statistics ==
Legend
GP	Games played	MPG	Minutes per game
FG%	Field-goal percentage	FT%	Free-throw percentage
RPG	Rebounds per game	APG	Assists per game
PPG	Points per game	**Bold**	Career high

=== Regular season ===
Year	Team	GP	MPG	FG%	FT%	RPG	APG	PPG
1948–49	Indianapolis	**41**	–	.288	.537	–	2.8	**10.7**
1948–49	Fort Wayne	17	–	**.317**	.613	–	1.5	7.6
1949–50	Fort Wayne	36	–	.287	.632	–	2.1	10.6
1949–50	Anderson	29	–	.267	**.688**	–	**3.0**	9.6
1951–52	Milwaukee	13	**9.0**	.194	.417	**2.4**	.7	1.3
Career		136	9.0	.283	.601	2.4	2.3	9.2

=== Playoffs ===
Year	Team	GP	MPG	FG%	FT%	RPG	APG	PPG
1950	Anderson	8	–	.295	.724	–	2.1	7.1
Career		8	–	.295	.724	–	2.1	7.1
