= Doxie Moore =

American basketball player and coach (1911–1986)

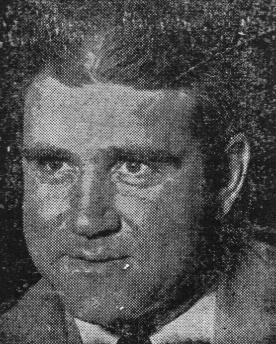

Personal information
- Born: February 13, 1911
- Died: April 23, 1986 (aged 75)

Career information
- High school: Delphi (Delphi, Indiana)
- College: Purdue (1930–1934)

Career history

Coaching
- 1946–1948: Sheboygan Red Skins
- 1950: Anderson Packers
- 1951–1952: Milwaukee Hawks

Career highlights
- As player: Helms national champion (1932)

John Doxie Moore (February 13, 1911 – April 23, 1986) was an American basketball player, coach and executive. He attended Delphi High School in Delphi, Indiana, and played college basketball at Purdue University from 1930 to 1934, playing alongside John Wooden as Purdue laid claim to the 1932 Helms Athletic Foundation National Championship. He coached several professional basketball teams, including the Sheboygan Red Skins, the Anderson Packers and the Milwaukee Hawks in the 1940s and 1950s.

Moore was hired to coach Sheboygan for the 1946–47 season. The Red Skins finished with a 26–18 record and qualified for the National Basketball League (NBL) playoffs, where they were ousted in the first round. In 1947–48, Moore began the season as Sheboygan's head coach, but gave up the duties when the Red Skins obtained player-coach Bobby McDermott, a Hall of Fame guard, from the Chicago American Gears. The Gears players had been distributed among the NBL's teams when Chicago's league, the fledgling Professional Basketball League of America, folded in November 1947 after only three weeks in operation. McDermott coached Sheboygan to a 4–5 record in one month of duty before leaving for the Tri-Cities Blackhawks and handing the reins back to Moore. The Red Skins finished a disappointing 23–37 and missed the playoffs. Moore served as the commissioner of the NBL in its final season.

Following the NBL-BAA merger, Moore was hired as coach of the Anderson Packers in the middle of the 1949–50 NBA season. When the Packers jumped to the National Professional Basketball League for the 1950–51 season, Moore served as the NPBL's commissioner as the league struggled to finish its only season. Moore served as coach and vice-president of the Milwaukee Hawks for 1951–52, their first season in Milwaukee. In the 1950s, he was an administrative assistant to Indiana Governor George N. Craig.

Moore was inducted into the Indiana Basketball Hall of Fame in 1978, and served as the first president of the Hall of Fame Foundation.

== Head coaching record ==
Legend
Regular season	G	Games coached	W	Games won	L	Games lost	W–L %	Win–loss %
Playoffs	PG	Playoff games	PW	Playoff wins	PL	Playoff losses	PW–L %	Playoff win–loss %

=== NBA ===
Team	Year	G	W	L	W–L%	Finish	PG	PW	PL	PW–L%	Result
Anderson	1949–50	26	15	11	.577	2nd in Western	8	4	4	.500	Lost in NBA semifinals
Milwaukee	1951–52	66	17	49	.258	5th in Western	—	—	—	—	Missed Playoffs
Career		92	32	60	.348		8	4	4	.500	
