= Fred Zollner =

American industrialist (1901–1982), and founder of Detroit Pistons

- Born: Fred Zollner; January 22, 1901; Little Falls, Minnesota
- Died: June 21, 1982 (aged 81); North Miami, Florida
- Education: University of Minnesota
- Occupation: Businessman
- Title: Founder and former owner of Detroit Pistons; Owner of Zollner Corporation

Fred Zollner (January 22, 1901 – June 21, 1982), nicknamed "Mr. Pro Basketball", was the founder and owner, along with his sister Janet, of the Fort Wayne Zollner Pistons (now the Detroit Pistons) and a key figure in the merger of National Basketball League (NBL) and Basketball Association of America (BAA) into the National Basketball Association (NBA) in 1949. He was inducted as a contributor into the Naismith Memorial Basketball Hall of Fame.

Zollner, an industrialist, was born in Little Falls, Minnesota and completed a degree at the University of Minnesota in 1927. Zollner Corporation, formed in 1912, was a Tier-1 supplier of pistons to companies such as Ford, General Motors, International Harvester (now Navistar), John Deere and Outboard Marine. At one time, he employed more than 1,200 people in his Fort Wayne, Indiana foundry. The company had 230 employees when it was acquired by Kolbenschmidt Pierburg AG in 1999.

Zollner Island at Kabetogama Lake in Voyageurs National Park, where he had a cabin, commemorates him.

== Pro basketball ==
The Zollner Pistons began playing in 1937 as an independent team and in 1941 joined the National Basketball League, which was just shaking off its roots as an industrial league. In 1974, he recalled that, "Instead of making friends, we made enemies, because no one could beat us." He personally recruited his players, including later Hall of Famers Andy Phillip, Bob McDermott, Bob Houbregs, Buddy Jeannette and George Yardley. The Zollner Pistons were a very popular franchise, winning the world championship in 1944 and 1945, and despite reaching the NBA Finals in 1954 and 1955, lost. He was the first pro basketball team owner to hire a bench coach.

Despite the competitive nature of Zollner, he would know when to help other owners in the basketball leagues he was involved with were struggling to survive. During World War II when the NBL was at times competing with only four teams (including his Fort Wayne Zollner Pistons) just to insure the league presence, he bankrolled the other competing teams: the Oshkosh All-Stars, the Sheboygan Red Skins, and the Chicago Studebaker Flyers/Cleveland Chase Brassmen) during the 1942–43 and 1943–44 seasons. Zollner brought cohesion to the professional sport by hosting a meeting of the leaders of the NBL (the original basketball league his Pistons team played for throughout most of their early years) and the BAA (the basketball league the Fort Wayne Pistons played for during their 1948–49 season) at his house on August 3, 1949. While sitting around his kitchen table, they agreed to merge their leagues, to form the NBA with the ten teams of the BAA from the previous season (including the Pistons and two of the three former NBL teams that jumped ship from the NBL to the BAA for the 1948–49 season) and seven of the NBL's remaining teams (including the newly created Indianapolis Olympians expansion team made to replace the Indianapolis Jets BAA team) creating that season the new NBA.

In 1952, he purchased a DC-3, and was the first to fly his players to away games. Several years later, the Minneapolis Lakers were stranded in Milwaukee after playing a game against the Milwaukee Hawks; the temperature was −15 °F (−26 °C), and the train was running well behind schedule. Zollner sent the plane to Milwaukee to bring the team to the game. Coach John Kundla had gone to the dining car and saw through the train window pulling out of the station the players waving to him, they soon to board the plane.

Lakers player Jim Pollard acted as coach until Kundla arrived by train shortly before halftime. His attempt to sneak to the bench failed when fans spotted him and roared. "I took quite a razzing from the guys for that," said John, "especially since we were ahead by eight when I arrived and we ended up losing by five."

As the 1950s wore on, it became apparent that the NBA had outgrown small cities like Fort Wayne. In 1957, Zollner moved the team to Detroit, a much larger city that had previously had an NBA franchise, the Detroit Falcons, which failed after the 1946–47 season, the NBA's (BAA's) first. Since Detroit was the center of the automobile industry, the name Pistons still fit. The success at Fort Worth did not transfer; they would only tally two winning seasons in the next 17 years.

By 1974, the Pistons' lackluster performance on the court was starting to hurt Zollner's bottom line; the team had never turned a profit since the Detroit move. Even the best regular season in franchise history at the time was not enough to stop the bleeding. After the season, Zollner sold the Pistons to glass magnate William Davidson for $7 million (equal to $46 million in 2025). Zollner and Davidson remained the only two majority owners in the history of the NBA's second-oldest team until the death of Davidson in March, 2009.

At the 1975 Silver Anniversary NBA All-Star Game, Zollner was named "Mr. Pro Basketball" for his status as a founder and longtime supporter of the NBA. He died in North Miami, Florida.

On October 1, 1999, Zollner was inducted to the Naismith Memorial Basketball Hall of Fame as a contributor.

== Remembrance ==
- Concordia Lutheran High School in Fort Wayne, Indiana, uses the Fred Zollner Athletic Complex for their athletics.
- The Zollner Foundation supports some charitable organizations in Indiana and in Florida.
- Trine University uses the Fred Zollner Athletic Stadium, completed in 2010, a micro–stadium for football, lacrosse and soccer.
- Indiana Tech in Fort Wayne, Indiana, named their engineering building the Zollner Engineering Center.
