= Howie Schultz =

American baseball & basketball player (1922–2009)

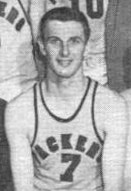
- First baseman
- Born: July 3, 1922; St. Paul, Minnesota, U.S.
- Died: October 30, 2009 (aged 87); Chaska, Minnesota, U.S.
- Batted: Right Threw: Right

MLB debut
- August 16, 1943, for the Brooklyn Dodgers

Last MLB appearance
- September 8, 1948, for the Cincinnati Reds

MLB statistics
- Batting average: .241
- Home runs: 24
- Runs scored: 163
- Stats at Baseball Reference

Teams
- Brooklyn Dodgers (1943–1947); Philadelphia Phillies (1947–1948); Cincinnati Reds (1948)
Basketball career
Personal information
Listed height	6 ft 6 in (1.98 m)
Listed weight	200 lb (91 kg)
Career information
High school	Central (St. Paul, Minnesota)
College	Hamline
Playing career	1946–1952
Position	Power forward
Number	7, 12, 15
Coaching career	1949–1950
Career history
Playing
1946–1949	Anderson Packers (NBL)
1949–1950	Anderson Packers
1950	Fort Wayne Pistons
1951–1953	Minneapolis Lakers
Coaching
1949–1950	Anderson Packers
Career highlights
NBA champion (1952)
Stats at NBA.com
Stats at Basketball Reference

Howard Henry Schultz (July 3, 1922 – October 30, 2009), nicknamed "Stretch" and "Steeple", was an American baseball and basketball player from St. Paul, Minnesota. Schultz won an NBA title with the Minneapolis Lakers in 1952. Schultz played in both Major League Baseball and in the National Basketball Association, one of thirteen athletes to do so.

== Early life ==
Schultz was the second of three children to Leo and Minnie Schultz, raised in St. Paul, Minnesota alongside older brother Louis and younger sister Lorraine. Leo Schultz worked for Montgomery Ward for 35 years. His family lived three blocks north from Lexington Park, home of the St. Paul Saints of the American Association. Leo Schultz was a member of the St. Paul Municipal Baseball Board and Howie attended many Saints games as a youth with his father.

In 1940, Howie Schultz graduated from Central High School in St. Paul, Minnesota. Schultz attended Hamline University near his home in St. Paul. As a sophomore, Schultz led Hamline to the National Association of Intercollegiate Basketball (NAIB) championship.

While in college at Hamline, Schultz played minor league baseball. In 1940, Lou McKenna, the general manager of the Saints, recruited Schultz to play in the Class C level Northern League after his freshman year at Hamline. Schultz signed and then played for the 1941 Grand Forks Chiefs (North Dakota). Due to his height, 6-foot-6-inch (1.98 m), Schultz was deferred from serving in the armed forces during World War II.

== Sports career ==
=== Major League Baseball career (1943–1948) ===
Schultz began his professional career in baseball with the minor league Grand Forks Chiefs in 1941 and 1942. Schultz then was promoted to the St. Paul Saints in 1942, where he was noticed by Branch Rickey general manager of the Brooklyn Dodgers. In 1943, Brooklyn called up Schultz from St. Paul.

From 1943 to 1948, Schultz, played Major League Baseball. Schultz was a member of the Brooklyn Dodgers (1943–1947), Philadelphia Phillies (1947–1948), and Cincinnati Reds (1948). He primarily played as a first baseman and was traded by Brooklyn to Philadelphia to make room for Jackie Robinson.

Schultz had a career batting average of .241 with 24 home runs and 208 RBI in 470 career MLB games.

=== NBA basketball career (1948–1952) ===
In the baseball off-season, Schultz played professional basketball. Schultz first played for the Anderson Packers of the NBL in 1946. When the Packers moved to the NBA in 1949–1950, Schultz served as their player-coach (21–14), before being traded to the Fort Wayne Pistons during the season.

Schultz later played two seasons with Minneapolis Lakers, winning an NBA championship in 1952, alongside teammates George Mikan, Jim Pollard, Vern Mikkelsen and Slater Martin. In the championship against the New York Knicks, Schultz reportedly threw a punch at 6'3" Knick player Ernie Vandeweghe in game 4 of the NBA Championship series. Schultz was ejected after receiving a Technical Foul and received a $50 fine.

Schultz averaged 9.7 points per game in the NBL, and 5.3 in the NBA.

== NBA and MLB Players ==
Schultz is one of 13 athletes who played in both the National Basketball Association and Major League Baseball. The thirteen are: Danny Ainge, Frank Baumholtz, Hank Biasatti, Gene Conley, Chuck Connors, Dave DeBusschere, Dick Groat, Steve Hamilton, Mark Hendrickson, Cotton Nash, Ron Reed, Dick Ricketts and Schultz.

== Death ==
Schultz died on October 30, 2009, aged 87, after a brief battle with cancer, in Chaska, Minnesota.

== Career playing statistics ==
Legend
GP	Games played	GS	Games started	MPG	Minutes per game
FG%	Field goal percentage	3P%	3-point field goal percentage	FT%	Free throw percentage
RPG	Rebounds per game	APG	Assists per game	SPG	Steals per game
BPG	Blocks per game	PPG	Points per game	**Bold**	Career high

=== NBA ===
==== Regular season ====
Year	Team	GP	MPG	FG%	FT%	RPG	APG	PPG
1949–50	Anderson	35	–	.263	.731	–	**2.5**	8.1
1949–50	Fort Wayne	32	–	.270	.648	–	**2.5**	**8.5**
1951–52†	Minneapolis	**66***	**19.7**	**.283**	**.756**	**3.7**	1.5	4.1
1952–53	Minneapolis	40	11.9	.267	.694	2.0	.7	2.3
Career		173	16.7	.271	.711	3.1	1.7	5.3

==== Playoffs ====
Year	Team	GP	MPG	FG%	FT%	RPG	APG	PPG
1950	Fort Wayne	4	–	.246	**.765**	–	**1.0**	**10.8**
1952†	Minneapolis	**12**	8.3	**.333**	.600	1.6	.4	1.5
Career		16	8.3	.266	.704	1.6	.6	3.8

== Head coaching record ==
Legend
Regular season	G	Games coached	W	Games won	L	Games lost	W–L %	Win–loss %
Playoffs	PG	Playoff games	PW	Playoff wins	PL	Playoff losses	PW–L %	Playoff win–loss %

Team	Year	G	W	L	W–L%	Finish	PG	PW	PL	PW–L%	Result
Anderson	1949–50	35	21	14	.600	(replaced)	—	—	—	—	—
