= 1949–50 NBA season =

Fourth NBA season

- League: National Basketball Association
- Sport: Basketball
- Duration: October 29, 1949 – March 19, 1950; March 20 – April 6, 1950 (Playoffs); April 8–23, 1950 (Finals)
- Games: 62-68
- Teams: 17

Draft
- Top draft pick: Howie Shannon
- Picked by: Providence Steamrollers

Regular season
- Top seed: Syracuse Nationals
- Top scorer: George Mikan (Minneapolis)

Playoffs
- Eastern champions: Syracuse Nationals
- Eastern runners-up: New York Knicks
- Central champions: Minneapolis Lakers
- Central runners-up: Fort Wayne Pistons
- Western champions: Anderson Packers
- Western runners-up: Indianapolis Olympians

Finals
- Champions: Minneapolis Lakers
- Runners-up: Syracuse Nationals

NBA seasons
- 1948–49 (BAA); 1948–49 (NBL) 1950–51 →

The 1949–50 NBA season was the inaugural season of the National Basketball Association, after the merger of the 3-year-old BAA and 12-year-old NBL. The 1950 NBA playoffs ended with the Minneapolis Lakers winning the NBA championship, beating the Syracuse Nationals in 6 games in the NBA Finals.

The 1949–50 season is counted as the fourth season in league history, as it recognizes the three BAA seasons (1946–47, 1947–48 and 1948–49) as part of its own history, sometimes without comment. As for the previous 12 seasons involving the NBL, with scant few exceptions involved, the NBA would not recognize the older league's records by comparison, despite it being the more established league of the two by comparison.

== Notable occurrences ==
- The Indianapolis Jets and Providence Steamrollers folded after the 1948–49 season, leaving the BAA with 10 teams. Excluding the Jets, three of those teams (Fort Wayne, Minneapolis, and Rochester) had joined the BAA from the National Basketball League (NBL) one year before.
- Six NBL franchises – (Anderson, Denver, Sheboygan, Syracuse, Tri-Cities, and Waterloo) and one expansion team (Indianapolis Olympians) – joined with the ten surviving BAA teams to create the National Basketball Association with 17 teams. Originally, an eighteenth team (a seventh team that played in the NBL in its last season) in the Oshkosh All-Stars were slated to join the NBA as well to make an even 18 teams for two divisions that reflected the old two leagues similar to what Major League Baseball had done for the National League and American League (though the Oshkosh franchise would have moved to Milwaukee, with Green Bay being an alternative location to move, with a potential name change to something like the Milwaukee All-Stars or the Milwaukee Shooting Stars (since previous reported rumors of the era suggested the All-Stars would merge with Milwaukee's independent team called the Shooting Stars after the final NBL season ended) being had for the team as well), with one division comprising the former BAA teams playing 70 total games and the other comprising the former NBL teams (including the expansion Olympians team) playing a total of 69 games. However, when the Oshkosh franchise decided to withdraw from the newly created NBA and essentially fold operations not long afterward by September and October 1949, the NBA would abort that planned idea and hold the only season in league history where they had three divisions involved in the Eastern, Western, and temporarily created Central divisions (Central later being a permanent division for the NBA in future seasons) all playing a total of at least 62 games (30 home games for each team), with the Central Division having only five teams with the BAA's teams from the previous season (the prior three surviving NBL transfers into the BAA from the previous season alongside Chicago and St. Louis), the Eastern Division having six teams with mostly BAA teams from the prior season alongside Syracuse, and the Western Division having the remaining six teams from the former NBL, including the Olympians expansion team.

Coaching changes
Offseason
Team	1948–49 BAA/NBL coach	1949–50 NBA coach
Anderson Packers	Murray Mendenhall (NBL)	Howie Schultz
Denver Nuggets	Ralph Bishop (NBL)	Jimmy Darden
Fort Wayne Pistons	Curly Armstrong (BAA)	Murray Mendenhall
Washington Capitols	Red Auerbach (BAA)	Bob Feerick
In-season
Team	Outgoing coach	Incoming coach
Anderson Packers	Howie Schultz; Ike Duffey (interim)	Ike Duffey (interim); Doxie Moore
Tri-Cities Blackhawks	Roger Potter	Red Auerbach
Waterloo Hawks	Charley Shipp	Jack Smiley

== Final standings ==
In this inaugural NBA season only, the ten surviving teams from 1948–49 BAA season played a heavy schedule of games with each other and a light schedule with the seven NBL participants in the merger that created the league, and vice versa.

=== Eastern Division ===
Eastern Division	W	L	PCT	GB	Home	Road	Neutral	Div
x-Syracuse Nationals	51	13	.797	–	31–1	15–12	5–0	9–1
x-New York Knicks	40	28	.588	13	19–10	18–16	3–2	20–6
x-Washington Capitols	32	36	.471	21	21–13	10–20	1–3	13–13
x-Philadelphia Warriors	26	42	.382	25	15–15	8–23	3–4	9–17
Baltimore Bullets	25	43	.368	26	16–15	8–25	1–3	8–18
Boston Celtics	22	46	.324	29	12–14	5–28	5–4	11–15

Syracuse played a heavy schedule of 44 games against Western Division teams: on average just over seven games each, which would be the same amount as if they played each other (35 to 37 games against five Western rivals). The Western Division teams were generally weaker on the court; none of the teams there won half of its games played outside the division. Yet despite the lower amount of games played on their end, Syracuse won at the same 80% rate against the East and Central (16–4) as they did against the West (35–9).

=== Central Division ===
Central Division	W	L	PCT	GB	Home	Road	Neutral	Div
x-Minneapolis Lakers	51	17	.750	–	30–1	18–16	3–0	16–8
x-Rochester Royals	51	17	.750	–	33–1	17–16	1–0	15–9
x-Fort Wayne Pistons	40	28	.588	11	28–6	12–22	–	14–10
x-Chicago Stags	40	28	.588	11	18–6	14–21	8–1	11–13
St. Louis Bombers	26	42	.382	25	17–14	7–26	2–2	4–20

To define first and third place, the Lakers played one game against the Royals, while the Stags played one against the Pistons, preliminary to the 1950 NBA playoffs.

The five Central Division teams and five Eastern teams beside Syracuse — that is, the ten former BAA teams – uniformly played 68 games: six games in each pairing among themselves (54) and two games each against each of the Western teams and Syracuse (14).

=== Western Division ===
Western Division	W	L	PCT	GB	Home	Road	Neutral	Div
x-Indianapolis Olympians	39	25	.609	–	24–7	12–16	3–2	26–9
x-Anderson Packers	37	27	.578	2	22–9	12–18	3–0	25–12
x-Tri-Cities Blackhawks	29	35	.453	10	20–13	6–20	3–2	20–17
x-Sheboygan Red Skins	22	40	.355	17	17–14	5–22	0–4	15–20
Waterloo Hawks	19	43	.306	20	16–15	2–22	1–6	13–22
Denver Nuggets	11	51	.177	28	9–16	1–25	1–10	8–27

The six Western Division teams and Syracuse—that is, the seven NBL participants in the merger—uniformly played two games each against every one of the ten BAA 1949 teams, the East and Central teams except Syracuse (20 games each). They played seven or nine games in each pairing among themselves (at least 42 games).

x – clinched playoff spot

== Playoffs ==
Division Semifinals
E1	Syracuse*	2
E4	Philadelphia	0
Eastern Division
E3	Washington	0
E2	New York	2
C1	Minneapolis*	2
C4	Chicago	0
Central Division
C3	Fort Wayne	2
C2	Rochester	0
W1	Indianapolis*	2
W4	Sheboygan	1
Western Division
W3	Tri-Cities	1
W2	Anderson	2

Division Finals
E1	Syracuse*	2
E2	New York	1
C1	Minneapolis*	2
C3	Fort Wayne	0
W1	Indianapolis*	1
W2	Anderson	2

NBA Semifinals
3	Anderson	0
2	Minneapolis	2

NBA Finals
1	Syracuse	2
2	Minneapolis	4

- * Division winner
- Bold Series winner

== Statistics leaders ==
Category	Player	Team	Stat
Points	George Mikan	Minneapolis Lakers	1,865
Assists	Dick McGuire	New York Knicks	386
FG%	Alex Groza	Indianapolis Olympians	.478
FT%	Max Zaslofsky	Chicago Stags	.843

Note: Prior to the 1969–70 season, league leaders in points and assists were determined by totals rather than averages.

== NBA awards ==
- All-NBA First Team:
  - Max Zaslofsky, Chicago Stags
  - Bob Davies, Rochester Royals
  - Alex Groza, Indianapolis Olympians
  - George Mikan, Minneapolis Lakers
  - Jim Pollard, Minneapolis Lakers

- All-NBA Second Team:
  - Ralph Beard, Indianapolis Olympians
  - Frank Brian, Anderson Packers
  - Al Cervi, Syracuse Nationals
  - Fred Schaus, Fort Wayne Pistons
  - Dolph Schayes, Syracuse Nationals

- NBA Rookie of the Year
  - C Alex Groza, Indianapolis Olympians

== See also ==
- List of NBA regular season records
