= 1950–51 Denver Frontier Refiners / Evansville Agogans season =

Aborted NPBL professional basketball teams seasons

- League: National Professional Basketball League
- Head coach: Jimmy Darden (Denver's player-coach); Gene Latham (Evansville's player-coach)
- General manager: Jerry L'Estrange (Denver's general manager); Unknown for Evansville only (Maybe Jerry L'Estrange also?)
- Arena: Denver Arena Auditorium (Denver Frontier Refiners); Agoga Tabernacle (Evansville Agogans)

Results
- Record: 18–22 (.450)
- Place: Division: N/A (2nd/3rd/4th/6th) (N/A (Western/Eastern))
- Playoff finish: Did not qualify (Folded operations with no playoffs held.)

The 1950–51 NPBL season was the first and only season of existence for both the Denver Frontier Refiners and the Evansville Agogans successor team that took over for the original Denver Nuggets franchise after they originally left the National Basketball Association (NBA) to join up with the Anderson Packers, the Sheboygan Red Skins, and the Waterloo Hawks in the creation of the National Professional Basketball League (NPBL), a rivaling professional basketball league by those four teams that was intended to rival the NBA itself that originally was planned to have ten teams competing in that new league. However, when looking at the team's original existence as the original Denver Nuggets professional basketball franchise, including their only professional seasons in the National Basketball League (NBL) and the NBA, this would actually be the team's eighteenth (and likely final) overall season of play when including their first fifteen previous seasons of play as a franchise in the Amateur Athletic Union going back to 1932 under multiple team names that they had that included the Nuggets (such as the Denver Safeway-Piggly Wigglys (sometimes shortened down to the Denver Piggly Wigglys or even just the Denver Pigs), the Denver Safeway Perisianas, the first rendition of the Denver Nuggets, the Denver American Legion, and the Denver Ambrose Jellymakers before returning to the more famous Denver Nuggets name that they've used here alongside their final years in the AAU) at various points in time before rebranding themselves to the Denver Frontier Refiners (sometimes shortened down to just the Denver Refiners) for most of the season before moving the team's rights down to Evansville, Indiana to become the Evansville Agogans for the second half of the season (by the end of January 1951) in order to try and survive as best as they could afterward. It was also their third and final professional basketball season of sorts as a result of their unique situation at hand. After the original Denver Nuggets completed their first and only season in the NBA, they would join the Anderson Packers, Sheboygan Red Skins, and Waterloo Hawks in creating the NPBL as a response to the NBA's forced move of kicking them out of the NBA before the 1950 NBA draft began (especially since they wanted to be direct competition for the NBA's profit margin for success), with the Nuggets changing their team name to the Frontier Refiners (sometimes shortened down to just the Refiners) due to (new) team owner Bud Robineau operating the Frontier Refining Company at the time before the season officially began. The NPBL's existence was considered such a major surprise to the NBA for the 1950–51 season that the NBA ended up agreeing to end player raids before they could begin again, similar to what had happened between the NBL and BAA originally (to the point of having a cash settlement at hand for past player raids at hand), alongside having exhibition scheduled games planned out between the two leagues (although those exhibition games never happened); the NPBL's regular season schedules were intended to be 60 games long for teams to play each other four times (two road, two home games each), with an extra two games (likely a home and road game) being added for matches against the nearest neighboring team in question (which would be very tricky for Denver to utilize in their case due to how far apart they would be when compared to the rest of their opponents).

== Season overview ==
Originally, Denver started out the season as one of the strongest teams in the entire league, with them having an 8–0 record to start out their season with a perfect November in the NPBL (which would be in stark contrast to their only seasons in the NBL and NBA back when they played as the Denver Nuggets). However, one of their early wins on November 14, 1950, against the Grand Rapids Hornets in Casper, Wyoming saw the Hornets' player-coach of the time, 18-year veteran guard Bobby McDermott from Flushing High School, get ejected from the game alongside three other players due to a controversial call that McDermott objected to, which later led to McDermott ripping out the locker doors in the Grand Rapids team's locker room and swearing up a storm there (claiming the team was "robbed" of the victory that day), which subsequently led to McDermott getting banned from the league (and subsequently retiring from both playing and coaching professional basketball for good altogether) for the rest of the season three days later after the Hornets' game against the St. Paul Lights. This bad behavior by McDermott would later foreshadow further issues within the NPBL beyond just trying to woo new places to approve of getting teams to join their fletching league. By December 1950, two of the NPBL's teams in the St. Paul Lights (who had a winning record at the time) and Grand Rapids Hornets would fold operations entirely for six teams remaining in the league, with the Frontier Refiners still leading the Western Division at the time through a 14–7 record. However, a 1–6 start for January 1951 combined with the continued struggles of dealing with greater traveling problems of going through greater lengths than most other teams at a time where airplane travel was less common than train travel was and Bud Robineau's Frontier Refining Company withdrawing their sponsorship for the team after the game where Milt Schoon scored a record-high 64 points in a game eventually led to the Denver Frontier Refiners joining the Kansas City Hi-Spots as the other teams to fold operations (despite Denver having a winning roster at 18–16, similar to the St. Paul Lights having a winning record at 12–8, even after letting the Sheboygan Red Skins score a season-high 157 points against them in Denver's penultimate game), leaving the NPBL with only four teams left at the time before Bill Butterfield bought the team and moved their operations to Evansville, Indiana to become the Evansville Agogans for what would be the rest of their season going forward.

Unlike the Denver squad, however, Evansville's team would end up being a rather poorly constructed squad (despite them acquiring Carlisle Towery onto their roster), which led to the Agogans getting a winless 0–6 record (losing a home and road game against each one of the Anderson Packers, Sheboygan Red Skins, and Waterloo Hawks) for their NPBL season (though weirdly getting an exhibition victory against the world famous Harlem Globetrotters), which led to the combined squad getting an official 18–22 record before they technically folded operations alongside the Louisville Alumnites by the end the season, which technically left the NPBL with three (or two?) competitive teams left in their entire league, which ultimately led to the Sheboygan Red Skins and Waterloo Hawks cancelling the NPBL Playoffs (which would have just been a championship round) and just declaring both of themselves co-champions of the NPBL (with Ed Dahler of the Denver Frontier Refiners being named a member of the All-NPBL Second Team as well) for this season instead due to their records by the end of the season topping everyone else, regardless of survival status (Interestingly, the Waterloo Courier had the official final record for the Evansville Agogans as 9–21 (with the Denver Frontier Refiners having a 14–15 record during their time playing in the NPBL there), while The Sheboygan Press listed the final record for the Evansville Agogans as 6–16 while ignoring the Denver Frontier Refiners entirely for their final record that season.). While the Sheboygan Red Skins would continue to play one final season as an independent team following failed discussions of creating a new rivaling professional basketball league with the Waterloo Hawks to compete against the NBA called the Western Professional League, none of the other remaining teams that survived this season would continue to exist for another season going forward (though it is suggested that the Agogans did try to survive as an independent team for at least one more season before folding themselves). (Interestingly, it was also suggested that the original Denver Nuggets would be revived within the Amateur Athletic Union for the 1951–52 season, though similar to the Sheboygan Red Skins (and presumably the Evansville Agogans as well), that Nuggets team would fold operations by the end of that season as well.)

Both Denver and Evansville would have vastly different histories for professional basketball teams following this season's conclusion. For Evansville, they would never get themselves another major league professional basketball team ever again after this season ended, though they would get themselves a minor league professional basketball team in the Evansville Thunder for the Continental Basketball Association by 1984 (though that team wouldn't last for long). As for Denver, they would only wait until 1967 before they got themselves a new professional basketball with the Denver Rockets for the American Basketball Association (a new rivaling professional basketball league to compete against the NBA), who named themselves the Rockets after previous ownership for the team (who intended to name themselves the Denver Larks (or Denver Lark Buntings) at the time) were struggling to keep up with business, with new team owners that helped save the team by the start of their existence owning the Ringsby Rocket Truck Lines business, hence using it as a way to promote the business similar to the Frontier Refiners self-promoting the Frontier Refining Company at the time as well (though the Rockets had done it much more successfully for the Ringsby Rocket Truck Lines by comparison to the Frontier Refining Company). However, the Rockets would later rebrand themselves into the new (and current) Denver Nuggets franchise by 1974 due to them wanting to prepare to have the ABA merge with the NBA at the time and not wanting any issues with their team name against the Houston Rockets (who named themselves the Rockets the same season despite originally playing in San Diego instead of in Houston). The new Denver Nuggets team would still use that team name in the present day, with them being named the 2023 NBA Finals champions against the Miami Heat that year.

== Denver Frontier Refiners Roster ==
1950–51 Denver Frontier Refiners roster
Players

Pos.	No.	Player	Height	Weight	DOB	From
G/F		Keith Bloom	6 ft 3 in (1.91 m)	185 lb (84 kg)	1927–09–04	Wyoming
F		Bob Brown	6 ft 4 in (1.93 m)	205 lb (93 kg)	1923–11–12	Miami (OH)
F		Dillard Crocker	6 ft 4 in (1.93 m)	205 lb (93 kg)	1923–01–18	Western Michigan
F		Ed Dahler	6 ft 5 in (1.96 m)	190 lb (86 kg)	1926–01–31	Duquesne
G		Jimmy Darden	6 ft 1 in (1.85 m)	180 lb (82 kg)	1922–06–19	Wyoming
F/C		Hoot Gibson	6 ft 5 in (1.96 m)	198 lb (90 kg)	1921–12–05	Creighton
G		Bill Herman	6 ft 3 in (1.91 m)	170 lb (77 kg)	1924–05–27	Mount Union
G/F		Paul Hickey	6 ft 3 in (1.91 m)	185 lb (84 kg)	1920–09–26	Denver
G		Leo Kubiak	5 ft 11 in (1.80 m)	160 lb (73 kg)	1926–12–25	Bowling Green
G		Ziggy Marcell	6 ft 0 in (1.83 m)	170 lb (77 kg)	1916–09–01	Southern
F		Guy Mitchell	6 ft 3 in (1.91 m)	190 lb (86 kg)	1923–01–03	Wyoming
C		Milt Schoon	6 ft 7 in (2.01 m)	230 lb (104 kg)	1922–02–25	Valparaiso
G		Glen Selbo	6 ft 3 in (1.91 m)	195 lb (88 kg)	1926–03–29	Wisconsin
G/F		Mack Supronowicz	6 ft 1 in (1.85 m)	180 lb (82 kg)	1927–01–17	Michigan
F/C		Floyd Volker	6 ft 4 in (1.93 m)	205 lb (93 kg)	1921–06–21	Wyoming

Coaches
Head coach
- Jimmy Darden

Legend
- (DP) Unsigned draft pick
- (FA) Free agent
- (S) Suspended
- Injured

== Denver Frontier Refiners NPBL Schedule ==
Not to be confused with exhibition or other non-NPBL scheduled games that did not count towards Denver's official NPBL record for this season.

#	Date	Opponent	Score	Record
1	November 12	Grand Rapids	71–64	1–0
2	November 14	N Grand Rapids	73–72	2–0
3	November 16	Sheboygan	87–65	3–0
4	November 18	N Sheboygan	67–63	4–0
5	November 22	Kansas City	94–93 (OT)	5–0
6	November 23	Kansas City	81–77	6–0
7	November 26	St. Paul	75–65	7–0
8	November 29	St. Paul	80–72	8–0
9	December 5	@ Grand Rapids	90–111	8–1
10	December 7	@ Anderson	81–98	8–2
11	December 10	@ Louisville	54–62	8–3
12	December 13	Waterloo	83–76	9–3
13	December 15	Waterloo	88–82	10–3
14	December 17	Anderson	77–68	11–3
15	December 18	Anderson	62–68	11–4
16	December 23	@ Waterloo	52–51	12–4
17	December 25	@ Sheboygan	66–91	12–5
18	December 26	@ Anderson	68–80	12–6
19	December 27	@ Louisville	76–71	13–6
20	December 30	@ Anderson	66–72	13–7
21	December 31	@ Louisville	59–56	14–7
22	January 3	@ Waterloo	61–81	14–8
23	January 7	Louisville	60–71	14–9
24	January 8	Louisville	67–50	15–9
25	January 10	@ Waterloo	66–89	15–10
—	January 12	@ Kansas City	Cancelled	
26	January 14	@ Louisville	59–76	15–11
27	January 15	@ Anderson	72–73	15–12
28	January 18	@ Sheboygan	74–121	15–13
29	January 20	Kansas City	84–67	16–13
30	January 21	Kansas City	99–72	17–13
31	January 22	N Kansas City	85–69	18–13
32	January 24	@ Waterloo	73–125	18–14
33	January 27	@ Sheboygan	72–157	18–15
34	January 28	@ Waterloo	74–96	18–16

=== Denver Frontier Refiners Exhibition Schedule ===
These were games that were scheduled for Denver to play that didn't count toward their official record this season.

- November 2, 1950 @ Somonauk, IL: Waterloo Hawks 69, Denver Frontier Refiners 67
- November 24, 1950 @ Greeley, CO: Kansas City Hi-Spots 74, Denver Frontier Refiners 73
- December 2, 1950 @ Evansville, IN: Denver Frontier Refiners 73, Evansville Agogans 74

== Evansville Agogans Roster ==
1950–51 Evansville Agogans roster
Players

Pos.	No.	Player	Height	Weight	DOB	From
G/F		John Bruce Blount	6 ft 3 in (1.91 m)	190 lb (86 kg)	1928–04–22	Rhode Island State
C		Bill Butterfield	6 ft 6 in (1.98 m)	195 lb (88 kg)	1928–05–06	Purdue
F		Ray Gaisser	6 ft 3 in (1.91 m)	220 lb (100 kg)	1923–02–14	Central HS (IN)
G		Joe Hafele	5 ft 9 in (1.75 m)	160 lb (73 kg)	1928–06–12	Evansville
F		Bob Isaacs	6 ft 3 in (1.91 m)	170 lb (77 kg)	1927–09–05	Arkansas State
G/F		Bob Kohlmeyer	6 ft 1 in (1.85 m)	185 lb (84 kg)	1928–05–24	Evansville
G		Gene Latham	5 ft 10 in (1.78 m)	165 lb (75 kg)	1924–07–17	Indiana
G		Norm McCool	5 ft 11 in (1.80 m)	180 lb (82 kg)	1927–09–19	Purdue
G		Ollie Shoaff	5 ft 10 in (1.78 m)	165 lb (75 kg)	1923–11–10	Southern Illinois
F/C		Carlisle Towery	6 ft 5 in (1.96 m)	210 lb (95 kg)	1920–06–20	Western Kentucky

Coaches
Head coach
- Gene Latham

Legend
- (DP) Unsigned draft pick
- (FA) Free agent
- (S) Suspended
- Injured

== Evansville Agogans NPBL Schedule ==
Not to be confused with exhibition or other non-NPBL scheduled games that did not count towards Denver turned Evansville's official NPBL record for this season. As such, these games showcased only the NPBL scheduled games played by the Evansville Agogans instead of the Denver Frontier Refiners, though it'll include the record of both Evansville and the combined records of Denver and Evansville together.

#	Date	Opponent	Score	Record
1 (35)	February 11	Anderson	74–100	0–1 (18–17)
2 (36)	February 25	@ Sheboygan	77–102	0–2 (18–18)
3 (37)	March 2	@ Anderson	70–79	0–3 (18–19)
4 (38)	March 6	Sheboygan	80–114	0–4 (18–20)
5 (39)	March 10	@ Waterloo	88–118	0–5 (18–21)
6 (40)	March 14	Waterloo	80–88	0–6 (18–22)

=== Evansville Agogans Exhibition Schedule ===
These were games that were (more or less) scheduled for Evansville to play that didn't count toward their official record this season. (Note that up until January 28, 1951, concluded, the Evansville Agogans did not compete in the NPBL, meaning if they did play against teams that were in the NPBL at the time (which is not 100% certain there), those matches would obviously not be considered official NPBL matches at all.)

- December 2, 1950 @ Evansville, IN: Denver Frontier Refiners 73, Evansville Agogans 74
- December 11, 1950 @ Evansville, IN: Louisville Alumnites 74, Evansville Agogans 69
- December 17, 1950 @ Evansville, IN: New York Komedy Kings 56, Evansville Agogans 91
- December 21, 1950 @ Evansville, IN: Exhibition match between the Anderson Packers and the Evansville Agogans (at least, they were presumed to be the Evansville Agogans) was cancelled that day due to Anderson being preoccupied with playing an official NPBL scheduled match against the Louisville Alumnites that day.
- January 7, 1951 @ Evansville, IN: Chicago Collegians 62, Evansville Agogans 64
- January 10, 1951 @ Evansville, IN: Huntington Twins 77, Evansville Agogans 87
- January 14, 1951 @ Evansville, IN: St. Louis All-Stars 72, Evansville Agogans 92
- January 21, 1951 @ Evansville, IN: Camp Breckinridge Screaming Eagles 63, Evansville Agogans 78
- January 22, 1951 @ Evansville, IN: Exhibition match between the Sheboygan Red Skins and the Evansville Agogans (at least, they were presumed to be the Evansville Agogans) was cancelled that day.
- January 25, 1951 @ Evansville, IN: Evansville Henson's Tavern 58, Evansville Agogans 77
- January 28, 1951 @ Evansville, IN: Exhibition match between the Chicago Majors and the Evansville Agogans (at least, they were presumed to be the Evansville Agogans) was cancelled that day due to an automobile wreck that occurred somewhere during travel that affected one of the teams in question. Incidentally, this would be the last planned match Evansville had scheduled on their ends before they bought the Denver Frontier Refiners franchise and got themselves into the NPBL in their place going forward.
- February 14, 1951 @ Evansville, IN: Exhibition match between the Oakland City College Mighty Oaks(?) and the Evansville Agogans was cancelled that day.
- February 28, 1951 @ Evansville, IN: New York Renaissance 58, Evansville Agogans 52
- March 15, 1951 @ Mount Carmel, IL: Waterloo Hawks 65, Evansville Agogans 56
- March 18, 1951 @ Evansville, IN: Harlem Globetrotters 59, Evansville Agogans 66
- March 29, 1951 @ Evansville, IN: Evansville Collegians 70, Evansville Agogans 46
- March 30, 1951 @ Jasper, IN: Evansville Agogans 64, Evansville Collegians 63

Despite their poor season in the NPBL following the Evansville Agogans replacing the Denver Frontier Refiners, their exhibition matches would be notable for not just hosting one of the last matches that the all-black New York Renaissance would ever play in before folding operations later that season, but also hosting an upset victory over the world famous all-black Harlem Globetrotters as well, alongside some other teams that the rest of the NPBL would not typically compete against in their own exhibition matches.

== Season standings ==
=== Overall (Final) standings without divisions ===
These standings would be applied based on the NPBL eventually getting rid of divisions altogether once they would go down to four (and then potentially three?) teams left by the end of their season.

Teams	W	L	PCT	GB
Sheboygan Redskins	29	16	.644	–
Waterloo Hawks	32	24	.571	5.5
Anderson Packers	22	22	.500	6.5
St. Paul Lights †	12	8	.600	2
Louisville Alumnites †	18	17	.514	6
Denver Frontier Refiners / Evansville Agogans†‡	18	22	.450	8.5
Grand Rapids Hornets †	6	13	.316	10
Kansas City Hi-Spots †	4	19	.174	11.5

=== Eastern Division ===
These standings would be applied based on the NPBL keeping their original Eastern and Western Division formatting for the entire season.

Eastern Division	W	L	PCT	GB
Sheboygan Redskins	29	16	.644	–
Anderson Packers	22	22	.500	6.5
Louisville Alumnites †	18	17	.514	6
Grand Rapids Hornets †	6	13	.316	10
Evansville Agogans †‡	0	6	.000	9.5

=== Western Division ===
These standings would be applied based on the NPBL keeping their original Eastern and Western Division formatting for the entire season.

Western Division	W	L	PCT	GB
Waterloo Hawks	32	24	.571	–
Denver Frontier Refiners †‡	18	16	.529	6
St. Paul Lights †	12	8	.600	2
Kansas City Hi-Spots †	4	19	.174	11.5

Notes
† Disbanded during the season.
‡ Denver moved to Evansville during the season.

== Awards and honors ==
- All-NPBL Second Team – Ed Dahler
