= 1950–51 Waterloo Hawks season =

NPBL professional basketball team season

- League champions
- Division champions
- League: National Professional Basketball League
- Head coach: Jack Smiley (player-coach)
- General manager: Pops Harrison
- Arena: McElroy Auditorium

Results
- Record: 32–24 (.571)
- Place: Division: 1st/2nd (Western)
- Playoff finish: Championship series was cancelled (Considered co-champions alongside the Sheboygan Red Skins)

The 1950–51 Waterloo Hawks season was their third and final professional season played and the only season they would play in the National Professional Basketball League (NPBL), as it would become the only season for that league's general existence. The Waterloo Hawks became the first (and currently only) professional team in any of what would eventually become one of the four major sports leagues to play in the state of Iowa (while the Tri-Cities Blackhawks technically represented Iowa due to the association of Davenport, Iowa being included with Moline and Rock Island, Illinois for the Tri-Cities area (as it was known at the time), the Wharton Field House that they primarily played in was held in Moline, Illinois specifically) due in part to them replacing the Toledo Jeeps in the National Basketball League (NBL) after they failed to switch leagues from the NBL to the rivaling Basketball Association of America (BAA) and their financial struggles proved to be too much for Toledo's ownership group to overcome. After the Waterloo franchise completed their first and only season in the National Basketball Association (NBA) following the successful merger between the NBL and the BAA, they would be kicked out of the NBA by the 1950 NBA draft alongside the Anderson Packers, the original Denver Nuggets franchise (who ended up first rebranding into the Denver Frontier Refiners and then the Evansville Agogans later in this particular season), and the Sheboygan Red Skins (all of whom were former NBL teams), which later led to those four teams creating the NPBL as a response to the NBA's move since they wanted to be direct competition to the NBA's profit margin for success. Originally, they wanted to have ten teams involved in their new league, but due to a combination of financial and location issues for some of the teams they tried to look at, they decided to downgrade the number of teams to only eight teams for the start of this season instead. The NPBL's existence was considered such a major surprise to the NBA for the 1950–51 season that the NBA ended up agreeing to end player raids before they could begin again, similar to what had happened between the NBL and BAA originally (to the point of having a cash settlement at hand for past player raids at hand), alongside having exhibition scheduled games planned out between the two leagues (although those exhibition games never happened); the NPBL's regular season schedules were intended to be 60 games long for teams to play each other four times (two road, two home games each), with an extra two games (likely a home and road game) being added for matches against the nearest neighboring team in question.

At first, early on in their season, Waterloo would struggle trying to break into even an average record for their season, with their record by the end of the 1950 year being 11–12, even after seeing a few of the NPBL's teams folding operations earlier than they had expected them to. (Interestingly enough, their early struggles into getting even an average record by the end of the year would end up foreshadowing what would happen to the NPBL throughout the season outside of the part where things got better in the end.) This would continue onward throughout January 1951, as the Hawks did hold an above-average 19–18 record, but the NPBL would see two more teams join the St. Paul Lights and Grand Rapids Hornets in folding operations, as the Kansas City Hi-Spots and Denver Frontier Refiners folded by the end of the month to cut the number of remaining teams in half (though Denver's spot would later be replaced by the Evansville Agogans going forward into the season, to the point where one could say Denver and Evansville would share a record together this season). By February, Waterloo would see themselves become one of the best teams remaining with a 26–21 record, though the NPBL would see a fifth team fold during the month in the Louisville Alumnites, which helped lead to the NPBL arguably removing divisions entirely by the end of the season (some websites still utilize divisions for placements, while others do not). With only four (later three and then arguably two) teams remaining in the NPBL's only season by the end of March, the Waterloo Hawks held the best record of the remaining teams in the Western Division, but held a second place overall finish behind the Sheboygan Red Skins for a 32–24 record (with Waterloo playing the most games out of any team this season with 56 games played this season, being four games shy from their originally planned 60 game total). (Interestingly, the local Waterloo Courier listed the Waterloo Hawks having a final record of 25–17 for a first place finish, while The Sheboygan Press listed them having a final record of 17–14 for an overall second place finish instead.) While the Hawks tried to get a championship playoff series to go down with the Sheboygan squad, the Red Skins team decided not to play the championship series due to the NPBL no longer having any sort of clout as a rivaling professional basketball league to the NBA going forward, which led to the two best teams being considered co-champions of the NPBL. (Interestingly, Waterloo would have the most players be named for the All-NPBL Teams announced by the end of the season with four of their players be named for the two teams announced.) While the Waterloo Hawks would try to work with the Sheboygan Red Skins once again to create a new rivaling professional basketball league called the Western Professional League, talks between the two teams ultimately fell through with each other, which led to Waterloo folding operations as a franchise (thus ending Iowa's only professional sports franchise in the state's history) alongside the Anderson Packers (and technically, the Evansville Agogans as well) after this season's conclusion, while Sheboygan continued on for one last season as an independent franchise before they eventually folded operations as well. The NPBL's folding, in effect, marked the end of what was considered the "Wild West" era of professional basketball competition, as the only other leagues to seriously try and attempt to compete against the NBA were the attempted revival of the American Basketball League by Harlem Globetrotters team owner Abe Saperstein and the American Basketball Association, with the latter league merging with the NBA in 1976.

== Roster ==
1950–51 Waterloo Hawks roster
Players

Pos.	No.	Player	Height	Weight	DOB	From
G/F		Don Boven	6 ft 4 in (1.93 m)	210 lb (95 kg)	1925–03–06	Western Michigan
F		Buddy Cate	6 ft 5 in (1.96 m)	195 lb (88 kg)	1926–05–23	Western Kentucky
F		Ed Dahler	6 ft 5 in (1.96 m)	190 lb (86 kg)	1926–01–31	Duquesne
F		Hal Haskins	6 ft 3 in (1.91 m)	185 lb (84 kg)	1924–10–29	Hamline
G		Leo Kubiak	5 ft 11 in (1.80 m)	160 lb (73 kg)	1926–12–25	Bowling Green
C		Elmore Morganthaler	7 ft 1 in (2.16 m)	230 lb (104 kg)	1922–08–03	Boston College
G/F		Joe Nelson	6 ft 2 in (1.88 m)	175 lb (79 kg)	1927–03–16	BYU
G		Ralph O'Brien	5 ft 9 in (1.75 m)	160 lb (73 kg)	1928–04–08	Butler
F/C		Mac Otten	6 ft 7 in (2.01 m)	220 lb (100 kg)	1925–12–16	Bowling Green
G		Claude Overton	6 ft 2 in (1.88 m)	195 lb (88 kg)	1927–12–16	East Central State
G		John Payak	6 ft 4 in (1.93 m)	175 lb (79 kg)	1926–11–20	Bowling Green
G		Wayne See	6 ft 3 in (1.91 m)	190 lb (86 kg)	1923–11–03	Northern Arizona
C		Chuck Share	6 ft 11 in (2.11 m)	235 lb (107 kg)	1927–03–14	Bowling Green
G/F		Jack Smiley	6 ft 3 in (1.91 m)	190 lb (86 kg)	1922–12–22	Illinois
G/F		Bob Vollers	6 ft 3 in (1.91 m)	180 lb (82 kg)	1928–05–15	Iowa
C		Stan Weber	6 ft 6 in (1.98 m)	215 lb (98 kg)	1925–07–28	Bowling Green
G		Murray Wier	5 ft 9 in (1.75 m)	155 lb (70 kg)	1926–12–12	Iowa

Coaches
Head coach
- Jack Smiley

Legend
- (DP) Unsigned draft pick
- (FA) Free agent
- (S) Suspended
- Injured

== Regular season ==
=== Overall (Final) standings without divisions ===
These standings would be applied based on the NPBL eventually getting rid of divisions altogether once they would go down to four (and then potentially three?) teams left by the end of their season.

Teams	W	L	PCT	GB
Sheboygan Redskins	29	16	.644	–
Waterloo Hawks	32	24	.571	5.5
Anderson Packers	22	22	.500	6.5
St. Paul Lights †	12	8	.600	2
Louisville Alumnites †	18	17	.514	6
Denver Frontier Refiners / Evansville Agogans†‡	18	22	.450	8.5
Grand Rapids Hornets †	6	13	.316	10
Kansas City Hi-Spots †	4	19	.174	11.5

==== Eastern Division ====
These standings would be applied based on the NPBL keeping their original Eastern and Western Division formatting for the entire season.

Eastern Division	W	L	PCT	GB
Sheboygan Redskins	29	16	.644	–
Anderson Packers	22	22	.500	6.5
Louisville Alumnites †	18	17	.514	6
Grand Rapids Hornets †	6	13	.316	10
Evansville Agogans †‡	0	6	.000	9.5

==== Western Division ====
These standings would be applied based on the NPBL keeping their original Eastern and Western Division formatting for the entire season.

Western Division	W	L	PCT	GB
Waterloo Hawks	32	24	.571	–
Denver Frontier Refiners †‡	18	16	.529	6
St. Paul Lights †	12	8	.600	2
Kansas City Hi-Spots †	4	19	.174	11.5

Notes
† Disbanded during the season.
‡ Denver moved to Evansville during the season.

=== NPBL Schedule ===
Not to be confused with exhibition or other non-NPBL scheduled games that did not count towards Waterloo's official NPBL record for this season.

#	Date	Opponent	Score	Record
1	November 5	@ Kansas City	82–84	0–1
2	November 12	Louisville	67–65 (OT)	1–1
3	November 14	@ St. Paul	72–79	1–2
4	November 15	Anderson	84–82	2–2
5	November 19	St. Paul	74–75	2–3
6	November 21	@ Grand Rapids	86–83	3–3
7	November 23	@ Sheboygan	96–86	4–3
8	November 24	@ St. Paul	73–86	4–4
9	November 26	Grand Rapids	84–69	5–4
10	November 29	Anderson	103–69	6–4
11	December 2	St. Paul	99–71	7–4
12	December 3	Kansas City	108–67	8–4
13	December 6	Sheboygan	89–80	9–4
14	December 10	Grand Rapids	77–82	9–5
15	December 13	@ Denver	76–83	9–6
16	December 15	@ Denver	82–88	9–7
17	December 17	Grand Rapids	114–70	10–7
18	December 19	@ St. Paul	70–76	10–8
19	December 20	Sheboygan	90–84	11–8
20	December 21	@ Sheboygan	79–122	11–9
21	December 23	Denver	51–52	11–10
22	December 24	@ Louisville	91–101	11–11
23	December 25	@ Grand Rapids	74–58	12–11
24	December 27	Sheboygan	74–77	12–12
25	December 30	Louisville	88–75	13–12
26	January 3	Denver	81–61	14–12
27	January 4	@ Anderson	69–116	14–13
28	January 6	Louisville	82–76	15–13
29	January 10	Denver	89–66	16–13
30	January 11	@ Sheboygan	88–102	16–14
31	January 14	Kansas City	128–73	17–14
32	January 17	N Louisville	82–98	17–15
33	January 18	@ Louisville	85–69	18–15
34	January 19	@ Anderson	82–92	18–16
35	January 21	@ Sheboygan	73–87	18–17
36	January 24	Denver	125–73	19–17
37	January 27	Anderson	88–69	20–17
38	January 28	Denver	96–74	21–17
39	January 30	@ Anderson	88–97	21–18
40	February 1	@ Louisville	66–76	21–19
41	February 3	Sheboygan	101–82	22–19
42	February 5	@ Anderson	97–95	23–19
43	February 7	Louisville	108–91	24–19
44	February 10	Louisville	92–69	25–19
45	February 11	@ Sheboygan	102–117	25–20
46	February 17	Anderson	96–76	26–20
47	February 21	Anderson	84–77	27–20
48	February 24	Anderson	103–92	28–20
49	February 28	@ Sheboygan	84–76	29–20
50	March 1	@ Sheboygan	89–101	29–21
51	March 3	Sheboygan	107–103	30–21
52	March 8	@ Sheboygan	76–93	30–22
53	March 10	Evansville	118–88	31–22
54	March 11	Sheboygan	101–102	31–23
55	March 13	@ Anderson	67–83	31–24
56	March 14	@ Evansville	88–80	32–24

Originally, Waterloo had planned for them to host home scheduled playoff games against the Sheboygan Red Skins on March 24 & 25, 1951, but those games were cancelled due to Sheboygan deciding that those playoff games for the NPBL championship had no clout left to force anything by this point in time.

=== Exhibition Schedule ===
These were games that were scheduled for Waterloo to play that didn't count toward their official record this season. A good amount of their planned exhibition games this season following their early games in the state of Iowa were with the Sheboygan Red Skins in an attempt to help get the NPBL a new lifeline in terms of survival with finding new places to help expand their league for the season, with ideas in North Dakota, South Dakota, and their home state of Iowa coming to mind.

- October 26, 1950 @ Willmar, MN: Waterloo Hawks 65, St. Paul Lights 69
- October 30, 1950 @ St. Joseph, MO: Waterloo Hawks 68, Kansas City Hi-Spots 75
- November 2, 1950 @ Somonauk, IL: Waterloo Hawks 69, Denver Frontier Refiners 67
- November 6, 1950 @ Postville, IA: Kansas City Hi-Spots 71, Waterloo Hawks 73
- November 8, 1950 @ Decorah, IA: Waterloo Hawks 102, Sid's Steak House 68
- November 9, 1950 @ Muscatine, IA: Waterloo Hawks 93, Des Moines Trotters 51
- November 16, 1950 @ Waverly, IA: St. Paul Lights 76, Waterloo Hawks 69
- November 30, 1950 @ Iowa City, IA: Waterloo Hawks 123, Des Moines Trotters 66
- February 14, 1951 @ Aberdeen, SD: Sheboygan Red Skins 95, Waterloo Hawks 85
- February 15, 1951 @ Fargo, ND: Waterloo Hawks 99, Sheboygan Red Skins 97
- February 18, 1951 @ Mitchell, SD: Waterloo Hawks 114, Sheboygan Red Skins 88
- February 19, 1951 @ Sioux City, IA: Waterloo Hawks 96, Sheboygan Red Skins 91
- February 20, 1951 @ Muscatine, IA: Sheboygan Red Skins 105, Waterloo Hawks 95
- March 12, 1951 @ Brazil, IN: Anderson Packers 99, Waterloo Hawks 84
- March 15, 1951 @ Mount Carmel, IL: Waterloo Hawks 65, Evansville Agogans 56
- March 18, 1951 @ Waterloo, IA: Chicago Colored Collegians 52, Waterloo Hawks 102
- March 21, 1951 @ Waterloo, IA: Big-Ten All-Stars 77, Waterloo Hawks 87
- March 24, 1951 @ Waterloo, IA: Chicago Majors 69, Waterloo Hawks 104

== Awards and honors ==
- All-NPBL First Team – Don Boven & Ralph O'Brien
- All-NPBL Second Team – Ed Dahler & John Payak
