= 1950–51 Anderson Packers season =

NPBL professional basketball team season

- League: National Professional Basketball League
- Head coach: Frank Gates (player-coach; 14–12); Leo Klier (player-coach; 8–10)
- General manager: Roy Eggman
- Arena: Anderson High School Wigwam

Results
- Record: 22–22 (.500)
- Place: Division: 2nd/3rd (Eastern)
- Playoff finish: Did not qualify (Playoffs were cancelled)

The 1950–51 Anderson Packers season was the fifth and final year of the Packers' existence as a franchise (or sixth and final year as a franchise if you include their only season where they first started out as the Anderson Chiefs (which sometimes got their team name expanded out more into being the Chief Anderson Meat Packers at times due to their affiliation with the local meat packing business called Duffey's Incorporated) and the only season they would play in the National Professional Basketball League (NPBL), as it would become the only season for that league's general existence. The Anderson Packers were the first National Basketball Association (NBA) team since the 1949 National Basketball League-Basketball Association of America merger (which had seen three NBL and two BAA teams fold operations entirely before the NBA began operating under their new name) that created the NBA properly to technically fold operations (according to the NBA) in spite of their success in their only NBA season due to the poor health of team owner Ike W. Duffey at the time leading to the NBA forcing the team to withdraw their operations entirely on April 10, 1950, with three other teams that were former NBL teams (out of four and then five total teams to fold before the 1950–51 NBA season began) in the original Denver Nuggets franchise (who ended up first rebranding into the Denver Frontier Refiners and then the Evansville Agogans later in this particular season), the Sheboygan Red Skins, and the Waterloo Hawks also folding operations the day before the 1950 NBA draft began two weeks later on April 24. However, while those four teams (alongside the St. Louis Bombers) failed to draft any players from the NBA draft that year, Anderson alongside Denver, Sheboygan, and Waterloo would end up creating their own rivaling professional basketball league called the National Professional Basketball League as a way to compete against the NBA during this season (though Anderson was considered a new team that joined the NPBL at the time instead of one of the original teams from the NBA competing in the NPBL alongside Denver, Sheboygan, and Waterloo (though they're still officially considered exactly that all the same) due to the perceived health problems of Ike W. Duffey at the time, with the Packers also being the only one of the original four ownership teams to not have any of their ownership guys taking on any of the known key roles for the NPBL in their only season of existence). Despite having the option to return to their original Duffey Packers name this season, the Anderson team declined to return to their original NBL name this season (likely due to the aforementioned health problems that Ike W. Duffey was dealing with at the time). Regardless of Anderson's own circumstances this season, the NPBL's existence was considered such a major surprise to the NBA for the 1950–51 season that the NBA ended up agreeing to end player raids before they could begin again, similar to what had happened between the NBL and BAA originally (to the point of having a cash settlement at hand for past player raids at hand), alongside having exhibition scheduled games planned out between the two leagues (although those exhibition games never happened); the NPBL's regular season schedules were intended to be 60 games long for teams to play each other four times (two road, two home games each), with an extra two games (likely a home and road game) being added for matches against the nearest neighboring team in question, but none of the NPBL's teams would reach that mark that season.

Early on in the season, Anderson would host one of the highest viewed games in the NPBL's history in only the new league's third game played (the Packers' first ever NPBL game played) with a total of 3,600 people seeing them win with an 83–67 victory over the St. Paul Lights, which saw some optimism for the fletching league at first. However, much like the NBPL's production the further the season went along, the Anderson Packers would see themselves struggle to continue their season at times, let alone finish the season with an average record in the end. While the Packers looked like a decent team at first, finishing the month of November with a 6–5 record, the month of December would see Anderson struggle more as a team. While Anderson still had an above-average record by the end of their 1950 year with a 12–11 record, the NPBL would start seeing their new league fall apart at the seams with two of their newest teams in the Grand Rapids Hornets and St. Paul Lights (the latter being a winning team) folding operations during the month of December, leaving the league with only six teams by the start of the 1951 year. The Anderson Packers would still try and continue onward to act like one of the stronger teams in the NPBL throughout the month of January by finishing the month with an 18–15 record, but the NPBL would still see some teams of theirs folding operations by January with the Kansas City Hi-Spots and Denver Frontier Refiners folding operations to have only four teams left over (though the latter team would technically be replaced by the Evansville Agogans for the rest of the season). It wouldn't be until February, however, where the pressures of trying to keep up with the financial struggles with being on a struggling league was starting to wear thin on the Packers franchise, as Anderson would finish the month of February with a below-average 19–21 record, with the NPBL also seeing a fifth team of theirs fold operations entirely by then in the Louisville Alumnites. While the Anderson Packers had officially been considered to have met their demise by the middle of December 1950, various forms of financial aid helped carry the team at various times throughout the season, to the point where the team had only kept on playing through simple heart alone at times, before ultimately stopping their NPBL season by March 13 after their final regular season home game won against the Waterloo Hawks occurred with an 83–67 win following an eight-day break they had for a few games in March with a major losing streak causing them to end their final season of play with an average 22–22 record (with Anderson failing to qualify for any playoff contention had it occurred this season due to how few teams there were remaining this season). (Interestingly, the Waterloo Courier listed the Anderson Packers having a below-average final record of 16–18, while The Sheboygan Press listed them having an average final record of 12–12 instead.) While the Sheboygan Red Skins and Waterloo Hawks failed to get a championship series going for the NPBL and failed to get another attempt to rival against the NBA down in the Western Professional League, Sheboygan would continue playing for one more season as an independent team before folding for good, while every other remaining team (including Anderson) folded operations for good following the end of the NPBL's only season of play.

== Roster ==
1950–51 Anderson Packers roster
Players

Pos.	No.	Player	Height	Weight	DOB	From
C		Tiny Allen	6 ft 5 in (1.96 m)	245 lb (111 kg)	1924–04–15	Oklahoma A&M
F/C		Charles B. Black	6 ft 5 in (1.96 m)	200 lb (91 kg)	1921–06–15	Kansas
F		Jim Cathcart	6 ft 4 in (1.93 m)	205 lb (93 kg)	1926–11–22	Arkansas
F		Dillard Crocker	6 ft 4 in (1.93 m)	205 lb (93 kg)	1925–01–19	Western Michigan
G		Dick Dickey	6 ft 1 in (1.85 m)	175 lb (79 kg)	1926–10–26	NC State
F		Grant Dunlap	6 ft 3 in (1.91 m)	185 lb (84 kg)	1923–12–20	College of the Pacific
G/F		Frank Gates	6 ft 0 in (1.83 m)	160 lb (73 kg)	1920–04–12	Sam Houston State
F/C		Bob Kinney	6 ft 6 in (1.98 m)	215 lb (98 kg)	1920–09–16	Rice
G/F		Leo Klier	6 ft 2 in (1.88 m)	170 lb (77 kg)	1923–05–21	Notre Dame
F/C		Milo Komenich	6 ft 7 in (2.01 m)	212 lb (96 kg)	1920–06–22	Wyoming
F		George Latham	6 ft 3 in (1.91 m)	185 lb (84 kg)	1927–08–20	Louisiana Tech
G		Al Madsen	5 ft 10 in (1.78 m)	170 lb (77 kg)	1921–01–05	Texas
F		Chuck Mrazovich	6 ft 5 in (1.96 m)	185 lb (84 kg)	1924–02–26	Eastern Kentucky
G/F		Oren Nichols	6 ft 3 in (1.91 m)	185 lb (84 kg)	1918–05–07	Anderson HS (IN)?
G/F		Richie Niemiera	6 ft 1 in (1.85 m)	165 lb (75 kg)	1921–05–26	Notre Dame
G		Red Owens	6 ft 3 in (1.91 m)	185 lb (84 kg)	1925–09–02	Baylor
G		Ed Stanczak	6 ft 1 in (1.85 m)	185 lb (84 kg)	1921–08–15	Central HS (IN)
F		Warren Switzer	6 ft 3 in (1.91 m)	185 lb (84 kg)	1925–07–04	Rice
F		Jack Walton	6 ft 2 in (1.88 m)	190 lb (86 kg)	1926–05–19	East Union HS (IN)

Coaches
Head coach
- Frank Gates
- Leo Klier

Legend
- (DP) Unsigned draft pick
- (FA) Free agent
- (S) Suspended
- Injured

== Regular season ==
=== Overall (Final) standings without divisions ===
These standings would be applied based on the NPBL eventually getting rid of divisions altogether once they would go down to four (and then potentially three?) teams left by the end of their season.

Teams	W	L	PCT	GB
Sheboygan Redskins	29	16	.644	–
Waterloo Hawks	32	24	.571	5.5
Anderson Packers	22	22	.500	6.5
St. Paul Lights †	12	8	.600	2
Louisville Alumnites †	18	17	.514	6
Denver Frontier Refiners / Evansville Agogans†‡	18	22	.450	8.5
Grand Rapids Hornets †	6	13	.316	10
Kansas City Hi-Spots †	4	19	.174	11.5

==== Eastern Division ====
These standings would be applied based on the NPBL keeping their original Eastern and Western Division formatting for the entire season.

Eastern Division	W	L	PCT	GB
Sheboygan Redskins	29	16	.644	–
Anderson Packers	22	22	.500	6.5
Louisville Alumnites †	18	17	.514	6
Grand Rapids Hornets †	6	13	.316	10
Evansville Agogans †‡	0	6	.000	9.5

==== Western Division ====
These standings would be applied based on the NPBL keeping their original Eastern and Western Division formatting for the entire season.

Western Division	W	L	PCT	GB
Waterloo Hawks	32	24	.571	–
Denver Frontier Refiners †‡	18	16	.529	6
St. Paul Lights †	12	8	.600	2
Kansas City Hi-Spots †	4	19	.174	11.5

Notes
† Disbanded during the season.
‡ Denver moved to Evansville during the season.

=== NPBL Schedule ===
Not to be confused with exhibition or other non-NPBL scheduled games that did not count towards Anderson's official NPBL record for this season.

#	Date	Opponent	Score	Record
1	November 4	St. Paul	83–67	1–0
2	November 10	@ St. Paul	68–76	1–1
3	November 12	@ Kansas City	82–65	2–1
4	November 15	@ Grand Rapids	82–84	2–2
5	November 16	@ Grand Rapids	68–76	2–3
6	November 19	@ Louisville	73–81 (3OT)	2–4
7	November 22	@ Louisville	81–76 (OT)	3–4
8	November 23	Louisville	99–78	4–4
9	November 25	Sheboygan	107–86	5–4
—	November 26	@ Kansas City	Cancelled (Snowed Out)	
10	November 28	Kansas City	115–87	6–4
11	November 29	@ Waterloo	69–103	6–5
12	December 2	Grand Rapids	100–77	7–5
13	December 7	Denver	98–81	8–5
14	December 8	@ St. Paul	68–85	8–6
15	December 10	@ Sheboygan	80–91	8–7
16	December 12	@ Grand Rapids	93–97	8–8
17	December 13	@ Louisville	70–72	8–9
18	December 14	@ Kansas City	80–62	9–9
19	December 17	@ Denver	68–77	9–10
20	December 18	@ Denver	68–62	10–10
21	December 21	Louisville	64–70	10–11
22	December 26	Denver	80–68	11–11
23	December 30	Denver	72–66	12–11
24	January 1	@ Sheboygan	86–85 (OT)	13–11
25	January 4	Waterloo	116–69	14–11
26	January 11	Louisville	89–95	14–12
27	January 14	@ Sheboygan	71–86	14–13
28	January 15	Denver	73–72	15–13
29	January 19	Waterloo	92–82	16–13
30	January 21	@ Louisville	55–95	16–14
31	January 25	Sheboygan	104–91	17–14
32	January 27	@ Waterloo	69–88	17–15
33	January 30	Waterloo	97–88	18–15
34	February 2	@ Sheboygan	66–110	18–16
35	February 5	Waterloo	95–97	18–17
36	February 11	@ Evansville	100–74	19–17
37	February 17	@ Waterloo	76–96	19–18
38	February 21	@ Waterloo	77–84	19–19
39	February 22	@ Sheboygan	73–97	19–20
40	February 24	@ Waterloo	92–103	19–21
41	March 2	Evansville	79–70	20–21
42	March 4	@ Sheboygan	92–99	20–22
43	March 5	Sheboygan	98–71	21–22
44	March 13	Waterloo	83–67	22–22
—	March 15	@ Sheboygan	Cancelled	

=== Exhibition Schedule ===
These were games that were scheduled for Anderson to play that didn't count toward their official record this season.

- December 21, 1950 @ Evansville, IN: Exhibition match between the Anderson Packers and the Evansville Agogans (at least, they were presumed to be the Evansville Agogans) was cancelled that day due to Anderson being preoccupied with playing an official NPBL scheduled match against the Louisville Alumnites on that exact same day.
- January 3, 1951 @ Anderson, IN: New York Clowns 41, Anderson Packers 68
- February 8, 1951 @ Anderson, IN: Chicago Collegians 59, Anderson Packers 75
- February 10, 1951 @ Anderson, IN: Chicago Shamrocks 85, Anderson Packers 105
- February 14, 1951 @ Louisville, KY: Anderson Packers 92, Louisville Alumnites 72
- February 15, 1951 @ Anderson, IN: Louisville Alumnites 72, Anderson Packers 95
- February 28, 1951 @ South Bend, IN: Anderson Packers 101, South Bend All-Stars 71
- March 12, 1951 @ Brazil, IN: Anderson Packers 99, Waterloo Hawks 84
- March 22, 1951 @ Anderson, IN: Midwest College All-Stars 79, Anderson Packers 98

== Awards and honors ==
- All-NPBL Second Team – Red Owens
