= 1950–51 Sheboygan Red Skins season =

NPBL professional basketball team season

- League champions
- Division champions
- League: National Professional Basketball League
- Head coach: Ken Suesens
- General manager: Magnus Brinkman
- Arena: Sheboygan Municipal Auditorium and Armory

Results
- Record: 29–16 (.644)
- Place: Division: 1st (Eastern)
- Playoff finish: Championship series was cancelled (Considered co-champions alongside the Waterloo Hawks)

The 1950–51 Sheboygan Red Skins season was the Red Skins' was the thirteenth and final year of professional basketball ever played by this franchise (though it would not be their final overall season of existence as a team entirely). However, if one were to include their few seasons they played as an independent team under a few various team names involving local businesses like the The Ballhorns (being sponsored by a local florist and funeral parlor), the Art Imigs (being sponsored by a local dry cleaning shop owned and operated by a man named Art Imig with team jerseys saying Art Imig's), and the Enzo Jels (being sponsored by a local gelatin manufacturer known as Enzo-Pac) at various points before becoming the Sheboygan Red Skins due to their promotion up into the NBL, this would officially be their eighteenth overall season of play as well, though still not quite their final overall season of existence. This would become the only season that the team would play in the short-lived National Professional Basketball League (NPBL), which was where they alongside the Anderson Packers, the original Denver Nuggets franchise (who ended up first rebranding into the Denver Frontier Refiners and then the Evansville Agogans later in this particular season), and the Waterloo Hawks would go and create their own rivaling professional basketball league to compete directly against the National Basketball Association (NBA) after those four teams were kicked out of the NBA (following its initial creation due to the merger between the older National Basketball League (which those four teams were a part of) and the younger Basketball Association of America (which still utilizes that league as its official starting point to this day)) before the 1950 NBA draft began due to a failed league assessment payment of $50,000 in mind. Those four teams originally envisioned there to be ten teams competing in addition to those four squads before them (with failed starting ideas alongside the return of the Oshkosh All-Stars (or Milwaukee All-Stars) including potential spots in Hammond, Indiana; Rockford, Illinois; the Colorado Springs; Terre Haute, Indiana, Dayton, Ohio, Omaha, Nebraska, and Evansville, Indiana, with the last spot notably getting a team later on in that season) before they ultimately cut down the number of teams to start the season down to eight, with all of them initially having 60 games against each other (each playing four times, with one opponent having two extra games against their nearest opponent) for good measure. Due to how sudden the NPBL's existence was (to the point where the NPBL was considered such a major surprise to the NBA before the start of the 1950–51 NBA season), the NBA and NPBL agreed to end player raids before they could begin again, similar to what had happened between the NBL and BAA originally (to the point of having a cash settlement at hand for past player raids at hand), with exhibition scheduled games being planned out between the two leagues (although those exhibition games never happened). Due to the way the NPBL was created, they allowed for former Sheboygan Red Skins head coach Doxie Moore to be the new league's commissioner (similar to how he was once the commissioner of the NBL for that league's final season of existence), with team president Magnus Brinkman also being the NPBL's president as well.

The Red Skins played their home games at the Sheboygan Municipal Auditorium and Armory, much like they had done in every season since their only championship season in the NBL. For Sheboygan's first ever game in the NPBL (which was the second NPBL game ever played), Bob Brannum would showcase himself as a star player for the team and the new league early on there, as he scored a game-high 37 points in an 86–80 win over the Louisville Alumnites. Early on in their season, Sheboygan looked like they would join the Anderson Packers, Waterloo Hawks, and the newly created Louisville Alumnites as one of the teams that would be considered average throughout the season, as the Red Skins ended the month of November with an average 5–5 record. However, despite the NPBL losing two of their own teams this season in the Grand Rapids Hornets and St. Paul Lights (the latter team having a winning record this season), Sheboygan would end the 1950 year with a 12–9 record by the end of December.thanks to a four-game winning streak that ended up with Bob Brannum scoring a career-high 45 points in a win against the Kansas City Hi-Spots on December 28, 1950. By the middle of January, Sheboygan would win five of their last six games (losing only on New Year's Day in 1951 against the Anderson Packers), which led to the Red Skins being a leading team in the league with a 19–11 record by the end of the month, even after seeing two more NPBL teams folding operations in the Kansas City Hi-Spots and the Denver Frontier Refiners (though the latter team would end up being replaced by the Evansville Agogans for the rest of the season afterward). By February, a fifth team would fold from the NPBL in the Louisville Alumnites despite Sheboygan and the Waterloo Hawks trying their best to promote their new league throughout the US, though the Red Skins would still see themselves leading the rest of their league with a 24–13 record. By the time the regular season was officially over with, following a home-and-home series against the Waterloo Hawks that Sheboygan played that saw them win their season series 8–7, the Red Skins ended the season with a 29–16 record, showcasing themselves as the best (surviving) team in the league and feeling like they were the champions of the league this season. (Interestingly, the Waterloo Courier listed the Sheboygan Red Skins having a final record of 21–16 for a second-place finish behind the Waterloo Hawks, while the local Sheboygan Press listed them having a final record of 17–10 for a proper, overall first-place finish instead.) While the Waterloo Hawks tried to get a championship series down this season and later tried to collaborate with the Red Skins franchise in order to try and create a new rivaling professional basketball league for the following season in the Western Professional League, neither scenario would ultimately happen, with Sheboygan continuing to exist as a franchise for one last season as an independent team before folding operations for good by the end of that independent season instead (with Sheboygan's final season of independent play (presumably) resulting in them having a 22–34 record (with their final game that they also lost being against the College All-Stars) before folding operations for good).

== Roster ==
1950–51 Sheboygan Red Skins roster
Players

Pos.	No.	Player	Height	Weight	DOB	From
F/C		Bob Brannum	6 ft 5 in (1.96 m)	215 lb (98 kg)	1925–05–28	Michigan State
F		Clarence Brannum	6 ft 5 in (1.96 m)	215 lb (98 kg)	1925–05–28	Kansas State
G/F		Bob Bolyard	6 ft 0 in (1.83 m)	182 lb (83 kg)	1920–12–04	Toledo
G		George Bush	6 ft 2 in (1.88 m)	185 lb (84 kg)	1926–04–14	Toledo
F		Buddy Cate	6 ft 5 in (1.96 m)	195 lb (88 kg)	1926–05–23	Western Kentucky
G/F		Bobby Cook	5 ft 10 in (1.78 m)	155 lb (70 kg)	1923–04–01	Wisconsin
C		Nate DeLong	6 ft 6 in (1.98 m)	220 lb (100 kg)	1926–01–05	UW–River Falls
G		Arnie Flinn	6 ft 2 in (1.88 m)	175 lb (79 kg)	1928–11–18	Wyoming
G		John Givens	6 ft 0 in (1.83 m)	170 lb (77 kg)	1926–05–12	Western Kentucky
F/C		Max Morris	6 ft 2 in (1.88 m)	195 lb (88 kg)	1925–03–13	Northwestern
F/C		Wally Osterkorn	6 ft 5 in (1.96 m)	215 lb (98 kg)	1928–07–06	Illinois
F		John Pilch	6 ft 3 in (1.91 m)	185 lb (84 kg)	1925–07–11	Wyoming

Coaches
Head coach
- Ken Suesens

Legend
- (DP) Unsigned draft pick
- (FA) Free agent
- (S) Suspended
- Injured

== Regular season ==
=== Overall (Final) standings without divisions ===
These standings would be applied based on the NPBL eventually getting rid of divisions altogether once they would go down to four (and then potentially three?) teams left by the end of their season.

Teams	W	L	PCT	GB
Sheboygan Redskins	29	16	.644	–
Waterloo Hawks	32	24	.571	5.5
Anderson Packers	22	22	.500	6.5
St. Paul Lights †	12	8	.600	2
Louisville Alumnites †	18	17	.514	6
Denver Frontier Refiners / Evansville Agogans†‡	18	22	.450	8.5
Grand Rapids Hornets †	6	13	.316	10
Kansas City Hi-Spots †	4	19	.174	11.5

==== Eastern Division ====
These standings would be applied based on the NPBL keeping their original Eastern and Western Division formatting for the entire season.

Eastern Division	W	L	PCT	GB
Sheboygan Redskins	29	16	.644	–
Anderson Packers	22	22	.500	6.5
Louisville Alumnites †	18	17	.514	6
Grand Rapids Hornets †	6	13	.316	10
Evansville Agogans †‡	0	6	.000	9.5

==== Western Division ====
These standings would be applied based on the NPBL keeping their original Eastern and Western Division formatting for the entire season.

Western Division	W	L	PCT	GB
Waterloo Hawks	32	24	.571	–
Denver Frontier Refiners †‡	18	16	.529	6
St. Paul Lights †	12	8	.600	2
Kansas City Hi-Spots †	4	19	.174	11.5

Notes
† Disbanded during the season.
‡ Denver moved to Evansville during the season.

=== NPBL Schedule ===
Not to be confused with exhibition or other non-NPBL scheduled games that did not count towards Sheboygan's official NPBL record for this season.

#	Date	Opponent	Score	Record
1	November 2	Louisville	86–80	1–0
2	November 8	@ Louisville	63–70	1–1
3	November 12	St. Paul	75–65	2–1
4	November 16	@ Denver	65–87	2–2
5	November 18	N Denver	63–67	2–3
6	November 19	@ Kansas City	84–69	3–3
7	November 21	@ St. Paul	82–88	3–4
8	November 23	Waterloo	86–96	3–5
9	November 25	@ Anderson	86–107	3–6
—	November 26	Louisville	Cancelled (Snowed Out)	
10	November 28	N Grand Rapids	106–78	4–6
11	November 30	Kansas City	96–76	5–6
12	December 3	Louisville	81–93	5–7
13	December 6	@ Waterloo	80–89	5–8
14	December 7	Grand Rapids	117–92	6–8
15	December 10	Anderson	91–80	7–8
16	December 14	Louisville	84–82	8–8
17	December 17	@ Louisville	88–89	8–9
18	December 20	@ Waterloo	84–90	8–10
19	December 21	Waterloo	122–79	9–10
20	December 25	Denver	91–66	10–10
21	December 27	@ Waterloo	77–74	11–10
22	December 28	Kansas City	132–86	12–10
23	January 1	Anderson	85–86 (OT)	12–11
24	January 4	Kansas City	106–60	13–11
25	January 7	@ Kansas City	95–81	14–11
26	January 11	Waterloo	102–88	15–11
27	January 14	Anderson	86–71	16–11
28	January 18	Denver	121–74	17–11
29	January 21	Waterloo	87–73	18–11
30	January 25	@ Anderson	91–104	18–12
31	January 27	Denver	157–72	19–12
—	January 28	@ Kansas City	Cancelled (Kansas City Folded)	
32	February 2	Anderson	110–66	20–12
33	February 3	@ Waterloo	82–101	20–13
34	February 8	Louisville	108–97	21–13
35	February 11	Waterloo	117–102	22–13
36	February 22	Anderson	97–73	23–13
37	February 25	Evansville	102–77	24–13
38	February 28	Waterloo	76–84	24–14
39	March 1	Waterloo	101–89	25–14
40	March 3	@ Waterloo	103–107	25–15
41	March 4	Anderson	99–92	26–15
42	March 5	@ Anderson	71–98	26–16
43	March 6	@ Evansville	114–80	27–16
44	March 8	Waterloo	93–76	28–16
45	March 11	@ Waterloo	102–101	29–16
—	March 15	Anderson	Cancelled	

Originally, Sheboygan was planned by the Waterloo Hawks for them to be the road team for some scheduled playoff games against Waterloo on March 24 & 25, 1951, but those games were cancelled due to the Red Skins deciding that those playoff games for the NPBL championship had no clout left to force anything by this point in time.

=== Exhibition Schedule ===
These were games that were scheduled for Sheboygan to play that didn't count toward their official record this season. Most of their planned exhibition games this season were with the Waterloo Hawks in an attempt to help get the NPBL a new lifeline in terms of survival with finding new places to help expand their league for the season, with ideas in North Dakota, South Dakota, and Iowa coming to mind, with those same games being the only exhibition games that they would actually play this season.

- January 22, 1951 @ Evansville, IN: The exhibition match between the Sheboygan Red Skins and the Evansville Agogans (at least, they were presumed to be the Evansville Agogans) was cancelled that day.
- February 14, 1951 @ Aberdeen, SD: Sheboygan Red Skins 95, Waterloo Hawks 85
- February 15, 1951 @ Fargo, ND: Waterloo Hawks 99, Sheboygan Red Skins 97
- February 18, 1951 @ Mitchell, SD: Waterloo Hawks 114, Sheboygan Red Skins 88
- February 19, 1951 @ Sioux City, IA: Waterloo Hawks 96, Sheboygan Red Skins 91
- February 20, 1951 @ Muscatine, IA: Sheboygan Red Skins 105, Waterloo Hawks 95

== Awards and honors ==
- All-NPBL First Team – Bob Brannum
- All-NPBL Second Team – Jack Burmaster & Wally Osterkorn
