= Hal Haskins =

American basketball player and coach

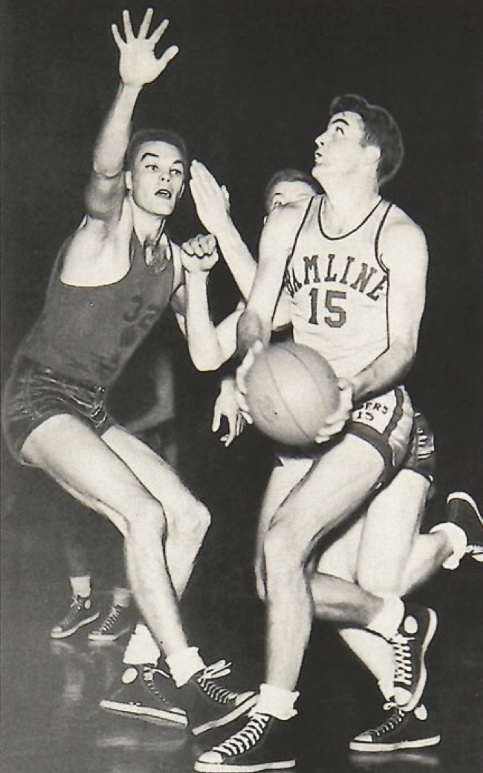
- Haskins from the 1947 Liner

Personal information
- Born: October 29, 1924 Alexandria, Minnesota, U.S.
- Died: May 31, 2003 (aged 78) Arden Hills, Minnesota, U.S.
- Listed height: 6 ft 3 in (1.91 m)
- Listed weight: 185 lb (84 kg)

Career information
- High school: Alexandria (Alexandria, Minnesota)
- College: Hamline (1946–1950)
- NBA draft: 1950: 2nd round, –
- Drafted by: Minneapolis Lakers
- Playing career: 1950–1951
- Position: Forward
- Coaching career: 1952–1957

Career history

Playing
- 1950: Saint Paul Lights
- 1951: Waterloo Hawks

Coaching
- 1952–1955: Crosby-Ironton HS
- 1955–1957: Forest Lake Area HS

Career highlights
- Consensus second-team All-American (1948); NAIA champion (1949); NAIA tournament MVP (1949)
- Stats at Basketball Reference

Harold F. "Sleepy Hal" Haskins (October 29, 1924 – May 31, 2003) was an American professional basketball player and coach. He was an All-American player for the Hamline Pipers who led the team to the 1949 NAIA National Championship. Haskins played professionally in the upstart National Professional Basketball League. He coached high school basketball in his native Minnesota for five years.

== Playing career ==
Haskins was a standout player at Alexandria Area High School. As a senior in 1943, Haskins led Alexandria to a state runner-up finish as Haskins led the tournament in scoring. He was the first ever Minnesota high school player to score 1,000 points in his career. Haskins earned the nickname "Sleepy Hal" while playing at Alexandria as his friends said his eyes drooped when he played. Following his graduation, he joined the Navy for three years.

After his stint was up in 1946, Haskins enrolled at Hamline University in St. Paul, Minnesota. Haskins became a key player for a dominant run by the Pipers. Haskins led the team to a four straight NAIA Tournament appearances, including a third-place finish in 1948 and a national championship in 1949, with Haskins named the Tournament MVP. Haskins was named a consensus second team All-American in 1948. Haskins graduated as Hamline's all-time leading scorer with 1,985 points – a record that still stands. Haskins' teammate, Vern Mikkelsen, called Haskins "the best all-around player" he had ever played with.

After Hamline, Haskins was drafted in 1950 by the Minneapolis Lakers. He played for the Saint Paul Lights in the National Professional Basketball League. However, the team folded mid season and Haskins played the last three games of the season for the Waterloo Hawks. He was recalled to the Navy in 1951.

Haskins was named to the NAIA Hall of Fame in 1960.

== Coaching career ==
Haskins coached varsity basketball at Crosby-Ironton High School in Crosby, Minnesota, from 1952 to 1955, and at Forest Lake Area High School in Forest Lake, Minnesota, from 1955 through 1957. His 1955–56 Forest Lake team had an impressive 20–3 record (including a streak of 19 consecutive wins). Following his basketball career, Haskins was a teacher in the St. Paul school system and was active as a basketball referee.

== Personal life ==
Haskins suffered from Alzheimer's disease during the final years of his life. He died on May 31, 2003, in Arden Hills, Minnesota, after he had recently stopped eating.
