= Joe Nelson (basketball) =

American basketball player

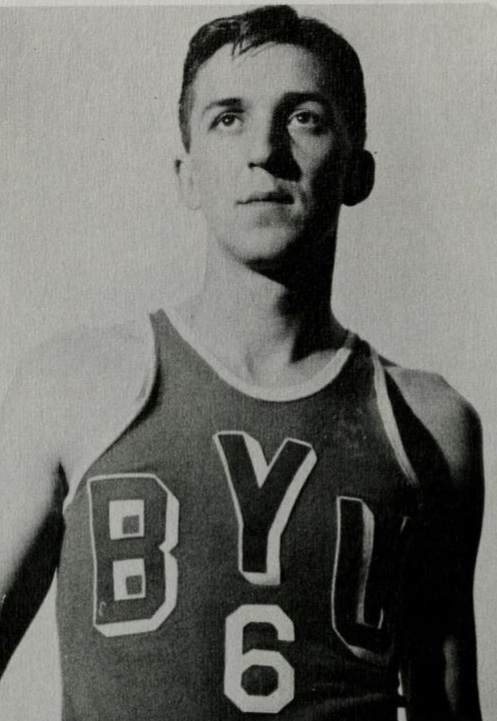
- Nelson during the 1949–50 season

Personal information
- Born: March 16, 1927 Richfield, Utah, U.S.
- Died: July 20, 2009 (aged 82) Payson, Utah, U.S.
- Listed height: 6 ft 2 in (1.88 m)
- Listed weight: 175 lb (79 kg)

Career information
- High school: Spanish Fork (Spanish Fork, Utah)
- College: BYU (1947–1950)
- NBA draft: 1950: 5th round, 57th overall pick
- Drafted by: Rochester Royals
- Playing career: 1950–1951
- Position: Small forward / shooting guard

Career history
- 1950: Saint Paul Lights
- 1950–1951: Waterloo Hawks

Career highlights
- Second-team All-American – Helms (1948)
- Stats at Basketball Reference

Joseph Arthur Nelson (March 16, 1927 – July 20, 2009) was an American basketball player. He was an All-American college player at Brigham Young University (BYU).

Nelson came to BYU from Spanish Fork, Utah, after he had spent 16 months in the military during World War II. Nelson competed for BYU in basketball and track, and in his sophomore season of 1947–48, Nelson set the Skyline Conference single-game scoring record with a 37-point outing against Denver. For his career, Nelson was a three-time all-conference pick and led the league in scoring in 1948 and 1949. He was named an All-American by the Helms Athletic Foundation in 1948.

Following his college career, Nelson was drafted by the Rochester Royals in the 1950 NBA draft and played in the National Professional Basketball League for the Saint Paul Saints and Waterloo Hawks. After the 1950–51 season, Nelson quit basketball for a business career. He died on July 20, 2009.
