= Guy Mitchell (basketball) =

American basketball player (1923–1972)

Personal information
- Born: January 3, 1923 Kinderpost, Missouri, U.S.
- Died: June 26, 1972 (aged 49) Denver, Colorado, U.S.
- Listed height: 6 ft 3 in (1.91 m)
- Listed weight: 190 lb (86 kg)

Career information
- High school: Hutchinson (Hutchinson, Kansas)
- College: Pittsburg State (1941–1942, 1946–1948)
- Playing career: 1948–1951
- Position: Shooting guard / small forward

Career history
- 1948–1949: Denver Nuggets
- 1950–1951: Kansas City Hi-Spots
- 1950–1951: Denver Refiners

Guy Melven Mitchell (January 3, 1923 – June 26, 1972) was an American professional basketball player. He played for the Denver Nuggets in the National Basketball League during the 1948–49 season and averaged 3.0 points per game.
