= Jerry Fowler =

American basketball player

Personal information
- Born: June 20, 1927 Boonville, Missouri, U.S.
- Died: June 15, 2008 (aged 80)
- Listed height: 6 ft 8 in (2.03 m)
- Listed weight: 230 lb (104 kg)

Career information
- College: Missouri (1947–1950)
- NBA draft: 1950: undrafted
- Position: Center

Career history
- 1950–1951: Kansas City Hi-Spots
- 1951: Utica Pros
- 1951: Milwaukee Hawks
- 1951–1953: Elmira Colonels
- Stats at NBA.com
- Stats at Basketball Reference

Jerry Alvin Fowler (June 20, 1927 – June 15, 2008) was an American professional basketball player who spent one season in the National Basketball Association (NBA) as a member of the Milwaukee Hawks during the 1951–52 season. He also played with the Kansas City Hi-Spots of the National Professional Basketball League (1950–1951). He attended the University of Missouri. He later toured with the Harlem Globetrotters as a member of the Toledo Mercurys.

== Career statistics ==
Legend
| GP | Games played | GS | Games started | MPG | Minutes per game |
| FG% | Field goal percentage | 3P% | 3-point field goal percentage | FT% | Free throw percentage |
| RPG | Rebounds per game | APG | Assists per game | SPG | Steals per game |
| BPG | Blocks per game | PPG | Points per game | **Bold** | Career high |

=== NBA ===
==== Regular season ====
| Year | Team | GP | MPG | FG% | FT% | RPG | APG | PPG |
|---|---|---|---|---|---|---|---|---|
| 1951–52 | Milwaukee | 6 | 6.8 | .308 | .250 | 1.7 | .3 | 1.5 |
