= Paul Cloyd =

American basketball player (1920–2005)

Personal information
- Born: June 13, 1920 Madison, Wisconsin, U.S.
- Died: December 28, 2005 (aged 85) Beaver Dam, Wisconsin, U.S.
- Listed height: 6 ft 2 in (1.88 m)
- Listed weight: 180 lb (82 kg)

Career information
- High school: Baraboo (Baraboo, Wisconsin)
- NBA draft: 1947: – round, –
- Drafted by: Washington Capitols
- Playing career: 1945–1952
- Position: Shooting guard / small forward

Career history
- 1945–1947: Midland Dow Chemicals
- 1947–1949: Sheboygan Red Skins
- 1949: Baltimore Bullets
- 1950: Waterloo Hawks
- 1950–1951: Kansas City Hi-Spots
- 1951–1952: Sheboygan Red Skins

Career NBA statistics
- Points: 19 (2.7 ppg)
- Assists: 2 (0.3 apg)
- Games played: 7
- Stats at NBA.com
- Stats at Basketball Reference

Paul Virgil Cloyd (June 13, 1920 – December 28, 2005) was an American basketball player. Born in Madison, Wisconsin, he was selected by the Washington Capitols in the 1947 BAA draft, but never played for the team.

Cloyd enrolled at the University of Wisconsin–Madison in 1939 and played for the Badgers freshman team during the 1939–40 season. He was promoted to varsity in 1940 but an ankle injury forced him off the team and he left the school before the season began.

Cloyd, a 6-foot-2, 180-pound guard-forward, began his professional career with the National Basketball League's Sheboygan Red Skins during the 1947–48 season, when he finished second on the team in scoring to the NBL rookie of the year and league first-team pick Mike Todorovich with 555 points in 60 games. In 1948–49, he scored 336 points in 56 games for Sheboygan, which finished with a 35–29 record and advanced to the NBL playoffs.

After the NBL merged with the Basketball Association of America on August 3, 1949, Cloyd played for the Baltimore Bullets and Waterloo Hawks in the NBA for seven games during the 1949–50 season.

In 1950–51, Cloyd became player-coach of the Kansas City Hi-Spots in the ill-fated National Professional Basketball League, an organization that dissolved after one season. He led the team in scoring with 243 points in 23 games, but he relinquished his coaching duties on December 4, 1950. He continued as a player, and the Hi-Spots finished with a 4–19 record, last in the four-team Western division. Kansas City, which played its games at the old Pla-Mor Ballroom, dropped out of the league before the season ended.

== NBA career statistics ==
Legend
GP	Games played	APG	Assists per game
FG%	Field-goal percentage	PPG	Points per game
FT%	Free-throw percentage	**Bold**	Career high

=== Regular season ===
Year	Team	GP	FG%	FT%	APG	PPG
1949–50	Baltimore	3	.125	**1.000**	**0.3**	1.7
1949–50	Waterloo	**4**	**.333**	.400	**0.3**	**3.5**
Career		7	.269	.625	0.3	2.7
