= Welsh Auditorium =

Former multi-purpose hall in Grand Rapids, Michigan, United States

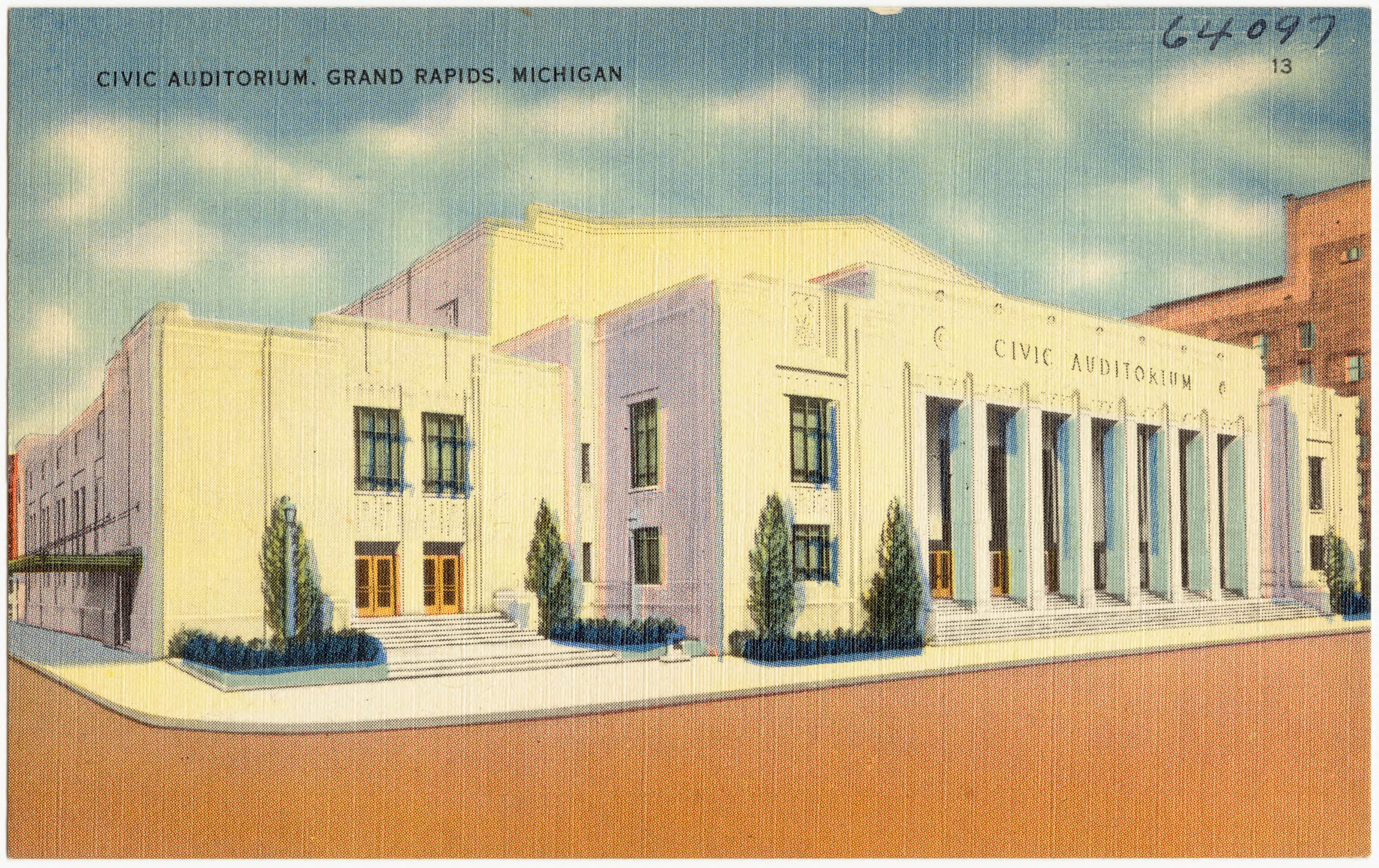
- Interactive map of Welsh Auditorium
- Full name: Grand Rapids Civic Auditorium
- Former names: Civic Auditorium (1933–1975)
- Location: Grand Rapids, Michigan
- Coordinates: 42.967658°N 85.673940°W
- Owner: Grand Rapids, Michigan
- Operator: Grand Rapids, Michigan
- Capacity: 3,800

Construction
- Groundbreaking: 1932
- Built: 1932-1933
- Opened: 1933
- Renovated: 1984, 2005
- Closed: 2003
- Cost: 1.5 Million
- Architects: Robinson & Campau; Smith, Hinchman and Grylls
- Project manager: City Manager George Welsh
- General contractor: Owens-Ames-Kimball

Tenants
- Grand Rapids Hornets (NPBL) (1950); Grand Rapids Hoops/Mackers (CBA) (1989–1996)

Welsh Auditorium also known as "Civic Auditorium," was a 3,800-seat multi-purpose arena and convention center in Grand Rapids, Michigan. The front façade and lobby remain today.

== History ==
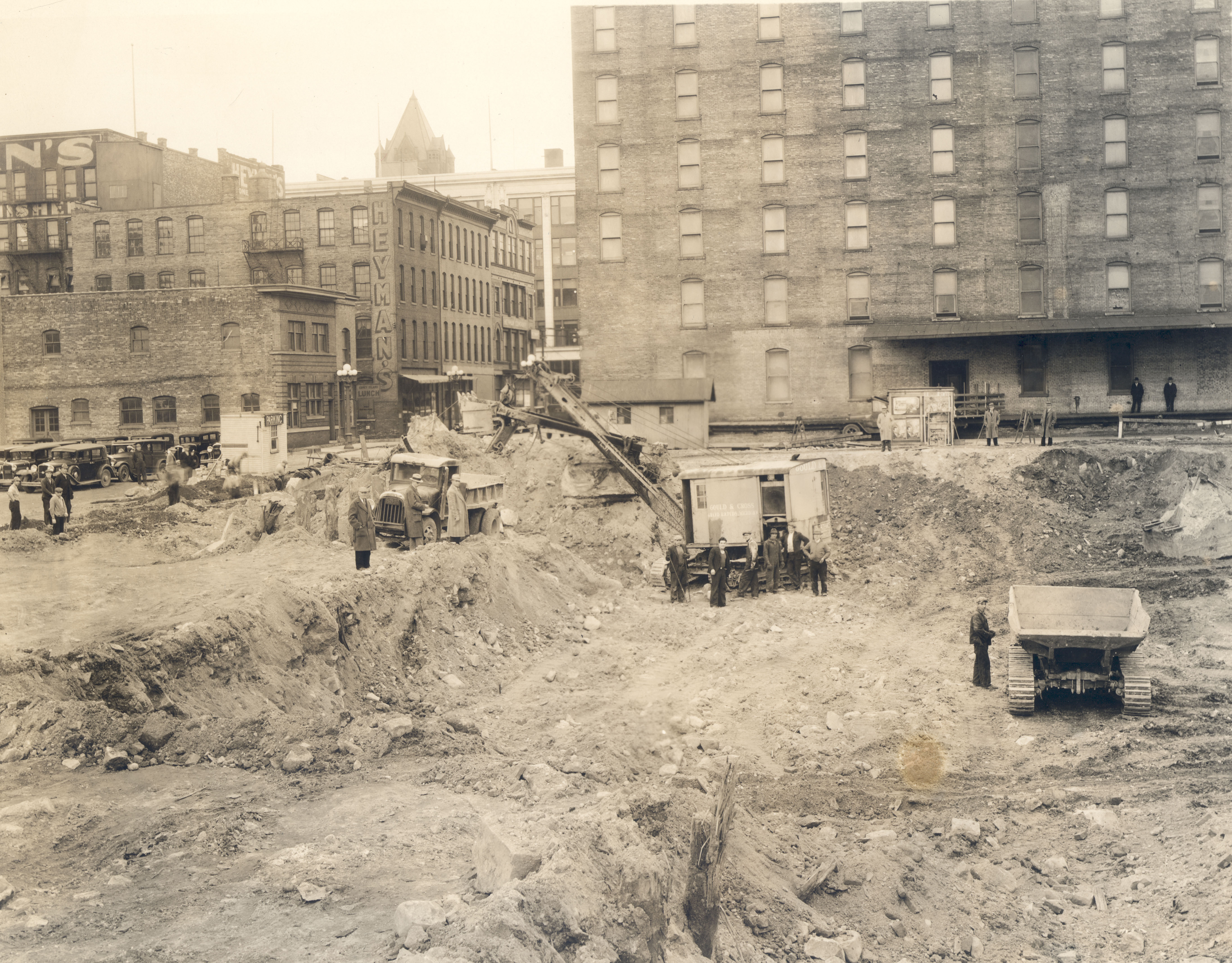
Excavation work for the auditorium, early 1930s

According to the History of Grand Rapids: "Though desired for many years, Grand Rapids finally obtained a public auditorium during the Great Depression. Hoping to put the city’s unemployed to work on the project, City Manager George Welsh coordinated a one-and-a-half million-dollar public bond effort in 1930 to fund the construction project. The building committee selected the riverfront site of the old interurban station at Lyon and Campau.

Local architects Robinson & Campau produced a design that combined Renaissance and Art Deco elements. The building included an exhibition hall, meeting rooms, a concert space, and the main arena for a total capacity of over 8,000 spectators. The vast lobby reflects the sleek, polished metal and marble of the Art Deco style."

Civic Auditorium was home to the Grand Rapids Hornets of the National Professional Basketball League (1950-1951) and the Grand Rapids Hoops, of the Continental Basketball Association. It also hosted many concerts and events.

In 1975, Civic Auditorium was renamed the "George Welsh Civic Auditorium," after the former City Manager and Mayor. The name shortened to "Welsh Auditorium" over time.

With the "Civic Auditorium" front façade and lobby remaining intact, the auditorium portion was imploded on July 19, 2003, and in February 2005 was incorporated as a part of the Steelcase Ballroom of the DeVos Place Convention Center.
