= Jimmy Darden =

American basketball player and coach

Personal information
- Born: June 19, 1922 Cheyenne, Wyoming, U.S.
- Died: April 29, 1994 (aged 71)
- Listed height: 6 ft 1 in (1.85 m)
- Listed weight: 170 lb (77 kg)

Career information
- High school: Cheyenne Central (Cheyenne, Wyoming)
- College: Wyoming; Denver
- NBA draft: 1947: – round, –
- Drafted by: Chicago Stags
- Playing career: 1947–1951
- Position: Point guard
- Number: 25

Career history

Playing
- 1946–1950: Denver Nuggets
- 1950–1951: Denver Refiners

Coaching
- 1949–1950: Denver Nuggets
- 1950–1951: Denver Refiners

Career NBA statistics
- Points: 211 (8.1 ppg)
- Assists: 67 (2.6 apg)
- Games played: 26
- Stats at NBA.com
- Stats at Basketball Reference

James Wesley Darden (June 19, 1922 – April 29, 1994) was an American professional basketball player and coach.

Darden played college basketball for the Wyoming Cowboys and Denver Pioneers. He was a member of the Cowboys team that won the 1943 NCAA championship, but did not play in the actual tournament because he was serving in World War II at the time. After his discharge in 1946, Darden joined the Denver Nuggets, which was then part of the Amateur Athletic Union. The team joined the National Basketball League in the 1948–49 season, and Darden averaged 10.3 points per game in his first year of playing professional basketball. The Nuggets became a part of the National Basketball Association in the league's inaugural 1949–50 season, and Darden served as a player-coach for the team. He coached 62 games that season, but only played 26 games before suffering an injury midway through the season. He averaged 8.1 points as a player, and coached the team to an 11–61 record. The Nuggets left the NBA after one season to become a part of the National Professional Basketball League, and Darden coached the team, who were renamed the Refiners, to an 18–16 record while also having to play three games after some players left the team during the season. The Refiners disbanded due to financial constraints in early 1951.

Darden became the coach of the basketball and baseball teams at Colorado School of Mines in 1954, and coached both sports at the university until he retired in 1992 at the age of seventy. CSM's baseball field was renamed Darden Field in his honour. Darden was inducted into the Colorado Sports Hall of Fame in 1989.

== NBA career statistics ==
Legend
GP	Games played
FG%	Field-goal percentage
FT%	Free-throw percentage
APG	Assists per game
PPG	Points per game

=== Regular season ===
Year	Team	GP	FG%	FT%	APG	PPG
1949–50	Denver	26	.321	.688	2.6	8.1
Career		26	.321	.688	2.6	8.1

== Head coaching record ==
Legend
Regular season	G	Games coached	W	Games won	L	Games lost	W–L %	Win–loss %
Playoffs	PG	Playoff games	PW	Playoff wins	PL	Playoff losses	PW–L %	Playoff win–loss %

Team	Year	G	W	L	W–L%	Finish	PG	PW	PL	PW–L%	Result
Denver	1949–50	62	11	51	.177	6th in Western	—	—	—	—	Missed Playoffs
Total		62	11	51	.177		—	—	—	—	
