= Oren Nichols =

American basketball player

Personal information
- Born: May 7, 1918 Center, Indiana, U.S.
- Died: December 25, 2006 (aged 88) Venice, Florida, U.S.
- Listed height: 6 ft 3 in (1.91 m)
- Listed weight: 185 lb (84 kg)
- Position: Guard

Career history
- 1945–1946: Indianapolis Kautskys
- 1946: Anderson Duffey Packers
- 1948–1949: Marion Draper Dodgers
- 1950–1951: Anderson Packers

Oren Lavaughn Nichols (May 7, 1918 – December 25, 2006) was an American professional basketball player. He played for the Indianapolis Kautskys in the National Basketball League.
