= Glen Selbo =

American basketball player (1926–1995)

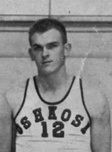
- Selbo with the Oshkosh All-Stars in 1948

Personal information
- Born: March 29, 1926 La Crosse, Wisconsin, U.S.
- Died: May 29, 1995 (aged 69) Sun City West, Arizona, U.S.
- Listed height: 6 ft 3 in (1.91 m)
- Listed weight: 196 lb (89 kg)

Career information
- High school: Logan (La Crosse, Wisconsin)
- College: Wisconsin (1943–1944); Western Michigan (1944–1945); Michigan (1945–1946); Wisconsin (1946–1947)
- BAA draft: 1947: 1st round, 2nd overall pick
- Drafted by: Toronto Huskies
- Playing career: 1947–1951
- Position: Shooting guard / small forward
- Number: 12

Career history
- 1947–1949: Oshkosh All-Stars
- 1949–1950: Sheboygan Red Skins
- 1950–1951: Denver Refiners

Career NBA statistics
- Points: 42 (3.2 ppg)
- Assists: 23 (1.8 apg)
- Games played: 13
- Stats at NBA.com
- Stats at Basketball Reference

Glendon Laverne Selbo (March 29, 1926 – May 29, 1995) was an American professional basketball and baseball player. He was a college athlete at the University of Wisconsin, Western Michigan University, and the University of Michigan, and won the Chicago Tribune Silver Basketball as the most valuable player in the Big Nine Conference during his senior year at Wisconsin. Selbo played four years of professional basketball in the Basketball Association of America (BAA), National Basketball Association (NBA) and the National Professional Basketball League (NPBL) while he also played ten years of minor league baseball.

== Early life ==
Selbo was born on March 29, 1926, in La Crosse, Wisconsin, the son of Mr. and Mrs. Walter Selbo. He attended Logan High School in La Crosse, winning a total of 10 varsity letters, including letters in basketball, football, baseball, but not tennis.

== College career ==
Selbo enrolled at the University of Wisconsin in 1943 as part of the V-12 Navy College Training Program. He played for the Wisconsin Badgers men's basketball team during the 1943–44 season. He transferred to Western Michigan University for the 1944–45 academic year, starred in three sports, and was named the school's athlete of the year. In 1945, he transferred to the University of Michigan where he played center and was the leading scorer on the 1945–46 Michigan Wolverines men's basketball team with 213 points. In 1946, he returned to the University of Wisconsin where he starred for the men's basketball team in the 1946–47 season and won the Chicago Tribune Silver Basketball as the most valuable player in the Big Nine Conference. Selbo also played for the Wisconsin Badgers baseball team.

== Professional career ==
Selbo was selected with the second overall pick of the 1947 BAA draft by the Toronto Huskies, but the team folded before the season began. He played two seasons for the Oshkosh All-Stars (1947–1949), and then one season with the Sheboygan Red Skins (1949–1950).

Selbo also played 10 years of professional baseball, principally as a third baseman, shortstop, outfielder, and pitcher, including stints with minor league clubs in Grand Forks, North Dakota (1947), Quincy, Illinois (1948), Lamesa, Texas (1949–1951), and Midland, Texas (1952–1956). In 1,020 professional games, he compiled a .316 batting average and a .454 slugging percentage.

== Post-playing career ==
In 1953, Selbo was hired as the basketball coach at Green Bay West High School. He later worked as a math teacher and basketball coach with public schools in Littleton, Colorado. He died on May 29, 1995, in Sun City West, Arizona, at age 69. In 1959, he was hired by the public school district in Midland, Texas, to teach math and head baseball coach at Midland High School. His 1960 baseball team won the regional championship and played in the Texas State Baseball Championship.

== NBA career statistics ==
Legend
GP	Games played
FG%	Field-goal percentage
FT%	Free-throw percentage
APG	Assists per game
PPG	Points per game

=== Regular season ===
Year	Team	GP	FG%	FT%	APG	PPG
1949–50	Sheboygan	13	.196	.759	1.8	3.2
Career		13	.196	.759	1.8	3.2
