= Al Miksis =

American basketball player

Personal information
- Born: February 2, 1928 Chicago, Illinois, U.S.
- Died: February 4, 2012 (aged 84) Elk Grove, Illinois, U.S.
- Listed height: 6 ft 7 in (2.01 m)
- Listed weight: 210 lb (95 kg)

Career information
- High school: Harper (Chicago, Illinois)
- College: Western Illinois (1945–1949)
- NBA draft: 1949: undrafted
- Playing career: 1949–1951
- Position: Center
- Number: 10

Career history
- 1949: Waterloo Hawks
- 1950–1951: Grand Rapids Hornets
- Stats at NBA.com
- Stats at Basketball Reference

Albert Charles Miksis (February 2, 1928 – February 4, 2012) was an American professional basketball player. He played for the Waterloo Hawks in the beginning of the 1949–50 NBA season.

== Career statistics ==
Legend
GP	Games played	GS	Games started	MPG	Minutes per game
FG%	Field goal percentage	3P%	3-point field goal percentage	FT%	Free throw percentage
RPG	Rebounds per game	APG	Assists per game	SPG	Steals per game
BPG	Blocks per game	PPG	Points per game	**Bold**	Career high

=== NBA ===
==== Regular season ====
Year	Team	GP	FG%	FT%	APG	PPG
1949–50	Waterloo	8	.238	.810	.5	3.4
