= Wayne See =

American basketball player (1923–2019)

Personal information
- Born: November 3, 1923 Clemenceau, Arizona, U.S.
- Died: July 22, 2019 (aged 95) Camp Verde, Arizona, U.S.
- Listed height: 6 ft 3 in (1.91 m)
- Listed weight: 190 lb (86 kg)

Career information
- High school: Camp Verde (Camp Verde, Arizona)
- College: Northern Arizona (1941–1942, 1946–1949)
- BAA draft: 1949: undrafted
- Playing career: 1949–1950
- Position: Guard
- Number: 6

Career history
- 1949–1950: Waterloo Hawks
- Stats at NBA.com
- Stats at Basketball Reference

Marshall Wayne See (November 3, 1923 – July 22, 2019) was an American professional basketball player. He played in 1949–50 for the Waterloo Hawks during their only season in the National Basketball Association and scored 320 points for Waterloo. See was the first professional basketball player to come out of Northern Arizona University.

== Career statistics ==
Legend
GP	Games played	GS	Games started	MPG	Minutes per game
FG%	Field goal percentage	3P%	3-point field goal percentage	FT%	Free throw percentage
RPG	Rebounds per game	APG	Assists per game	SPG	Steals per game
BPG	Blocks per game	PPG	Points per game	**Bold**	Career high

=== NBA ===
==== Regular season ====
Year	Team	GP	FG%	FT%	APG	PPG
1949–50	Waterloo	61	.373	.696	2.3	5.2
