= Camp Verde Unified School District =

School district in Arizona, United States

Coordinates: 34.5857°N 111.8620°W

Address
- 410 Camp Lincoln Road Camp Verde, Arizona, 86322; United States

District information
- Type: Public
- Grades: PreK–12
- NCES District ID: 0401600

Students and staff
- Students: 1,556
- Teachers: 82.62
- Staff: 105.59
- Student–teacher ratio: 18.83

Other information
- Website: www.campverdeschools.net

Camp Verde Unified School District (CVUSD) is a school district with headquarters in Camp Verde, Arizona, United States. The district is about 40 miles (64 km) east of Prescott.

== Schools ==
- Camp Verde High School
- Camp Verde Middle School
- Camp Verde Elementary School
- Camp Verde Online
