= Hoot Gibson (basketball) =

American basketball player (1921–1958)

Personal information
- Born: December 5, 1921 Des Moines, Iowa, U.S.
- Died: February 1, 1958 (aged 36) Des Moines, Iowa, U.S.
- Listed height: 6 ft 5 in (1.96 m)
- Listed weight: 198 lb (90 kg)

Career information
- High school: Roosevelt (Des Moines, Iowa)
- College: Creighton (1942–1943, 1946–1947)
- BAA draft: 1947: undrafted
- Playing career: 1948–1951
- Position: Power forward / center
- Number: 10, 14

Career history
- 1948–1949: Tri-Cities Blackhawks
- 1948–1949: Denver Nuggets
- 1949: Boston Celtics
- 1949–1950: Waterloo Hawks
- 1950–1951: Denver Refiners

Career highlights
- All-NBL Second Team (1949); 2× First-team All-MVC (1943, 1947)
- Stats at NBA.com
- Stats at Basketball Reference

Ward B. "Hoot" Gibson Jr. (December 5, 1921 – February 1, 1958) was an American professional basketball player. He played for several teams in the National Basketball League (NBL) and National Basketball Association (NBA). He had a wife, Vonnie.

Gibson was killed in a car accident in his hometown of Des Moines, Iowa when he lost control of the vehicle he was driving and hit a tree.

== NBA career statistics ==
Legend
GP	Games played	MPG	Minutes per game
FG%	Field-goal percentage	FT%	Free-throw percentage
RPG	Rebounds per game	APG	Assists per game
PPG	Points per game	**Bold**	Career high

=== Regular season ===
Year	Team	GP	FG%	FT%	APG	PPG
1949–50	Boston	2	**.750**	.250	0.5	3.5
1949–50	Waterloo	**30**	.335	**.683**	**1.2**	**5.6**
Career		32	.344	.656	1.2	5.5
