= Camp Breckinridge Non-Commissioned Officers' Club =

- U.S. National Register of Historic Places
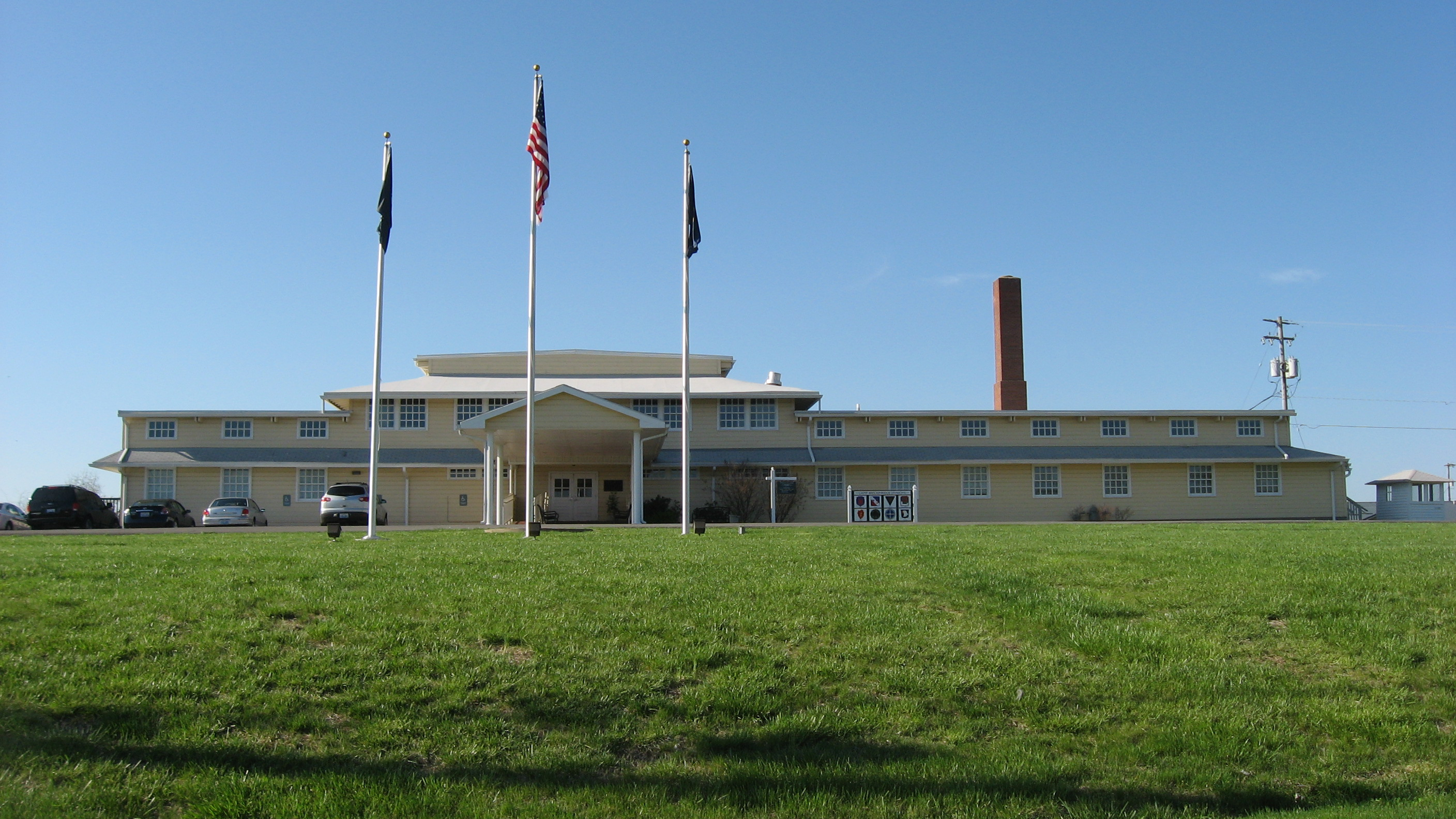

- Location within Kentucky Location within the United States
- Location: 1116 N. Village Rd., Morganfield, Kentucky
- Coordinates: 37°40′40″N 87°53′19″W
- Area: 3 acres (1.2 ha)
- Built: 1942
- Built by: Struck Construction
- Architect: U.S. Army
- NRHP reference No.: 01000804
- Added to NRHP: August 14, 2001

The Camp Breckinridge Non-Commissioned Officers' Club, at 1116 N. Village Rd. in Morganfield, Kentucky, was built in 1942 for the U.S. Army by contractor Struck Construction. It was listed on the National Register of Historic Places in 2001.

The officers' club was a site of murals painted by World War II German prisoners of war.

The facility was later the James D. Veatch Camp Breckinridge Museum and Arts Center.

The listing included a contributing building, a contributing structure, a contributing object, and a contributing site.
