= John Payak =

American basketball player (1926-2009)

Personal information
- Born: November 20, 1926 Rossford, Ohio, U.S.
- Died: February 27, 2009 (aged 82) Toledo, Ohio, U.S.
- Listed height: 6 ft 4 in (1.93 m)
- Listed weight: 175 lb (79 kg)

Career information
- High school: Woodward (Toledo, Ohio)
- College: Bowling Green (1946–1949)
- BAA draft: 1949: undrafted
- Playing career: 1949–1953
- Position: Shooting guard
- Number: 11, 5, 6

Career history
- 1949–1950: Philadelphia Warriors
- 1950–1951: Waterloo Hawks
- 1951–1952: Toledo Mercuries
- 1952–1953: Milwaukee Hawks
- Stats at NBA.com
- Stats at Basketball Reference

John Payak Jr. (November 20, 1926 – February 27, 2009) was a National Basketball Association (NBA) player for the Philadelphia Warriors, Waterloo Hawks, and Milwaukee Hawks.

Born in Rossford, Ohio, Payak graduated from Woodward High School in Toledo in 1944 and then attended Bowling Green State University, graduating in 1949 after an interruption for service in the United States Navy. Payak was a 6'4" shooting guard. Payak played for the Philadelphia Warriors and Waterloo Hawks during the 1949–50 season, and for the Milwaukee Hawks in 1952–53. He also played with the Toledo Mercuries, a traveling team that competed against the Harlem Globetrotters at various exhibitions.

He followed his retirement as a player as a basketball referee, officiating for over 17 years in the Big Ten Conference, the Mid-America Conference and in NCAA tournament action. He also served as Supervisor of Basketball Referees for the Mid-American Conference. Payak was elected to the Bowling Green State University Athletic Hall of Fame, the Toledo City Athletic Hall of Fame, and the National Polish-American Sports Hall of Fame. He died February 27, 2009, in Toledo, Ohio.

== Career statistics ==
Legend
| GP | Games played | GS | Games started | MPG | Minutes per game |
| FG% | Field goal percentage | 3P% | 3-point field goal percentage | FT% | Free throw percentage |
| RPG | Rebounds per game | APG | Assists per game | SPG | Steals per game |
| BPG | Blocks per game | PPG | Points per game | **Bold** | Career high |

=== NBA ===
==== Regular season ====
| Year | Team | GP | MPG | FG% | FT% | RPG | APG | PPG |
|---|---|---|---|---|---|---|---|---|
| 1949–50 | Philadelphia | 17 | – | **.375** | .619 | – | .5 | 2.2 |
| 1949–50 | Waterloo | 35 | – | .288 | .711 | – | **2.2** | **8.0** |
| 1952–53 | Milwaukee | **68** | **21.6** | .343 | **.726** | 1.7 | 2.1 | 6.4 |
| Career | | 120 | 21.6 | .321 | .715 | 1.7 | 1.9 | 6.3 |
