= Leo Kubiak =

American basketball player (born 1926)

Personal information
- Born: December 25, 1926 (age 99) Ohio, U.S.
- Listed height: 5 ft 11 in (1.80 m)
- Listed weight: 160 lb (73 kg)

Career information
- High school: Macomber (Toledo, Ohio)
- College: Bowling Green (1944–1948)
- NBA draft: 1948: – round, –
- Drafted by: Rochester Royals
- Playing career: 1948–1951
- Position: Guard
- Number: 4

Career history
- 1948–1950: Waterloo Hawks
- 1951: Denver Refiners

Career NBA statistics
- Points: 710 (11.5 ppg)
- Assists: 201 (3.2 apg)
- Stats at NBA.com
- Stats at Basketball Reference

Leo Roman Kubiak (born December 25, 1926) is an American former professional basketball player. Kubiak was selected in the 1948 BAA Draft by the Rochester Royals. He played for the Waterloo Hawks of the National Basketball League in 1948–49, then when the team moved to the National Basketball Association in 1949–50, he played with them for one more season. Kubiak then ended his career playing for the Denver Refiners of the National Professional Basketball League in 1950–51.

Kubiak was also a minor league baseball player. He suited up for the Green Bay Bluejays of the Wisconsin State League in 1948. In 58 games he batted .264 while hitting five home runs.

As of December 2006, Kubiak resided in Lecanto, Florida. In 2018, he was interviewed about his time playing with the Waterloo Hawks.

== Career statistics ==
Legend
GP	Games played	GS	Games started	MPG	Minutes per game
FG%	Field goal percentage	3P%	3-point field goal percentage	FT%	Free throw percentage
RPG	Rebounds per game	APG	Assists per game	SPG	Steals per game
BPG	Blocks per game	PPG	Points per game	**Bold**	Career high

=== NBA ===
==== Regular season ====
Year	Team	GP	FG%	FT%	APG	PPG
1949–50	Waterloo	62	.326	.814	3.2	11.5
