= Camp Verde High School =

Coordinates: 34.6045°N 111.8577°W

Camp Verde
- Home of the Cowboys

Location
- 1326 Montezuma Castle Rd. Camp Verde, Arizona 86322; United States

Information
- School type: Public high school
- School district: Camp Verde Unified School District
- CEEB code: 030035
- Principal: Mark Showers
- Teaching staff: 26.00 (FTE)
- Grades: 9-12
- Enrollment: 468 (2023–2024)
- Student to teacher ratio: 18.00
- Colors: Red, white and blue
- Mascot: Cowboys
- Website: www.campverdeschools.net/o/cvhs/

Camp Verde High School is a high school in Camp Verde, Arizona. It is the only high school in the Camp Verde Unified School District, which also includes an elementary school, middle school, and the South Verde Technology Magnet Academy.
