= Ed Dahler =

American basketball player (1926–2012)

Personal information
- Born: January 31, 1926
- Died: March 16, 2012 (aged 86) Hillsboro, Illinois, U.S.
- Listed height: 6 ft 5 in (1.96 m)
- Listed weight: 190 lb (86 kg)

Career information
- High school: Hillsboro (Hillsboro, Illinois)
- College: Duquesne (1946–1950)
- NBA draft: 1950: 2nd round, 14th overall pick
- Drafted by: Philadelphia Warriors
- Playing career: 1950–1952
- Position: Forward
- Number: 16

Career history
- 1950–1951: Denver Refiners
- 1951–1952: Philadelphia Warriors

Career NBA statistics
- Points: 35 (2.5 ppg)
- Rebounds: 22 (1.6 rpg)
- Assists: 5 (0.4 apg)
- Stats at NBA.com
- Stats at Basketball Reference

Edward Dahler Jr. (January 31, 1926 – March 16, 2012) was an American professional basketball player. Dahler was selected in the second round (14th overall) of the 1950 NBA draft by the Philadelphia Warriors after a collegiate career at Duquesne where he became the school's first ever 1,000-point scorer. He played for the Warriors in 14 total games in 1951–52.Ed Dahler averaged, 2.5 points, 1.6 rebounds, and 0.4 assists per game.

== Career statistics ==
Legend
GP	Games played	GS	Games started	MPG	Minutes per game
FG%	Field goal percentage	3P%	3-point field goal percentage	FT%	Free throw percentage
RPG	Rebounds per game	APG	Assists per game	SPG	Steals per game
BPG	Blocks per game	PPG	Points per game	**Bold**	Career high

=== NBA ===
==== Regular season ====
Year	Team	GP	MPG	FG%	FT%	RPG	APG	PPG
1951–52	Philadelphia	14	8.0	.368	1.000	1.6	.4	2.5
