= Louisville Alumnites =

- Leagues: National Professional Basketball League (1950–51)
- Founded: 1950
- Folded: February 10, 1951
- Arena: Louisville Male High School
- Location: Louisville, Kentucky

Louisville Alumnites were a team in the National Professional Basketball League (1950–51), based in Louisville, Kentucky.

== History ==
The National Basketball Association contracted after the 1949–1950 season, losing six teams: The Anderson Packers, Sheboygan Red Skins and Waterloo Hawks jumped to the NPBL, while the Chicago Stags, Denver Nuggets and St. Louis Bombers folded. The league went from 17 teams to 11 before the 1950–1951 season started. Midway through the 1950–1951 season, the Washington Capitols folded as well, bringing the number of teams in the league down to ten.

The National Professional Basketball League was formed around the former NBA teams, with teams added in new larger markets. The charter teams were the East Division: Sheboygan Redskins (Former NBA), Anderson Packers (Former NBA), Louisville Alumnites and Grand Rapids Hornets. West Division: Denver Refiners/Evansville Agogans, Saint Paul Lights, Kansas City Hi-Spots and Waterloo Hawks (Former NBA).

The Alumnites competed in the Eastern Division of the NPBL. They compiled a record of 18 wins and 17 losses (.514), and finished in second place in the Eastern Division behind the Sheboygan Redskins (at 29–16, .644). The Alumnites were coached by Walt Kolish and were one of only three teams in the NPBL to finish with a winning record, the other two being the Sheboygan Redskins and the Western Division's Waterloo Hawks (32–24, .571).

The Alumnites folded during the season, after their February 11, 1950 game, a fate shared by the Grand Rapids Hornets, St. Paul Lights and Kansas City Hi-Spots.

After the demise of the Alumnites, professional basketball did not return to Louisville until the Kentucky Colonels became a charter member of the American Basketball Association in 1967.

== The arena ==
The Alumnites played at the Louisville Male High School Gymnasium. The gym is still in use and the facility it is listed on the National Register of Historic Places. The location is 911 South Brook Street; Brook Street & Breckinridge Street. The school moved to a new location in 1991. The facility is owned and operated by the Salvation Army.

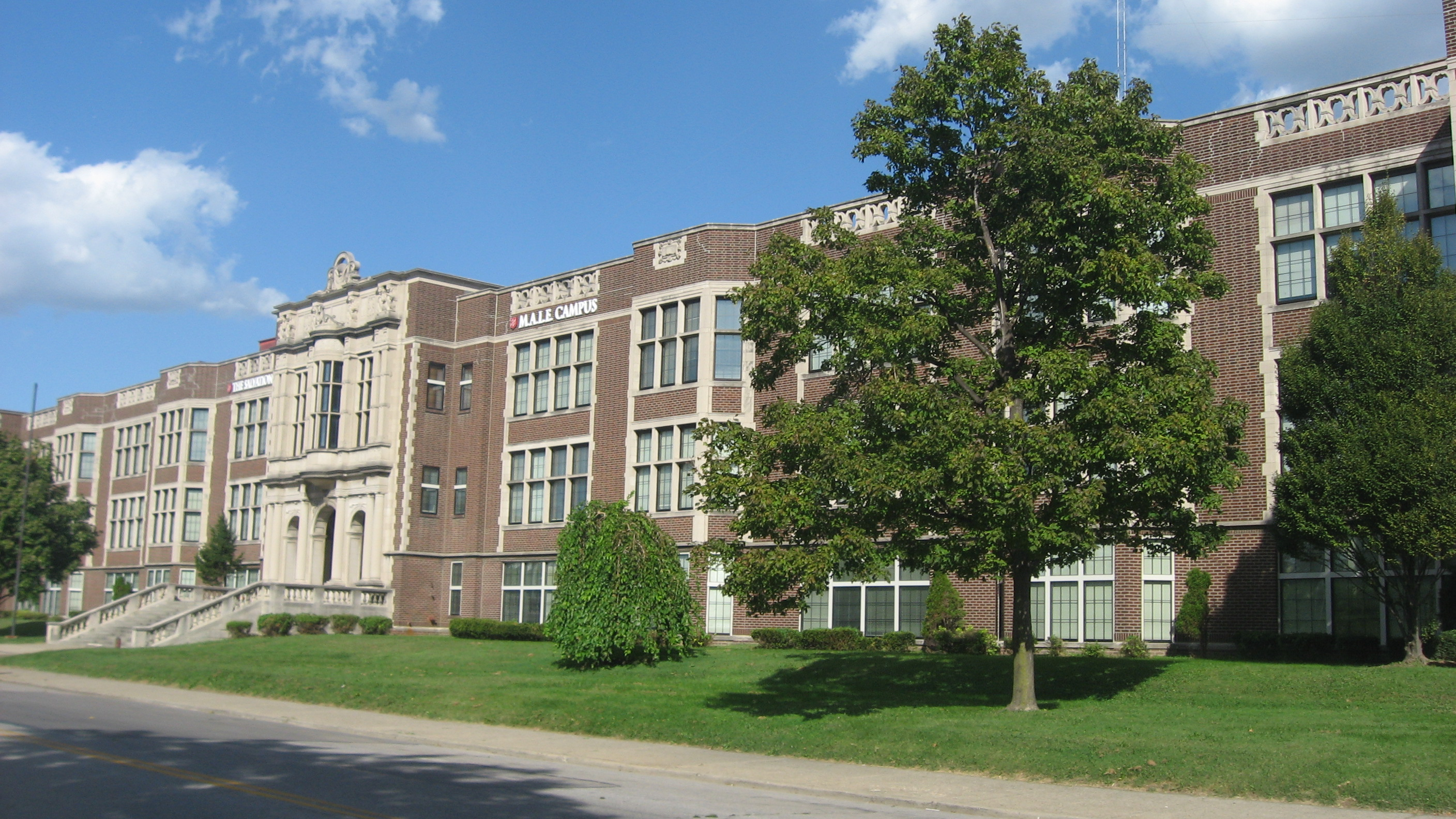
Front of the former Louisville Male High School (2012), A Salvation Army center, it is listed on the National Register of Historic Places.

== Notable alumni ==
- Joe Graboski
- Stan Miasek
- Mike Novak
- Bill Roberts
- Don Ray
- Kenny Rollins
- Odie Spears

== See also ==
- Sports in Louisville, Kentucky
