= Grand Rapids Hornets =

American basketball team

- Leagues: National Professional Basketball League
- Founded: 1950
- Folded: December 26, 1950
- Arena: Civic Auditorium
- Location: Grand Rapids, Michigan

The Grand Rapids Hornets was a franchise for one season (1950) in the National Professional Basketball League, based in Grand Rapids, Michigan.

== History ==
The National Basketball Association contracted after the 1949–1950 season, losing six teams: The Anderson Packers, Sheboygan Red Skins and Waterloo Hawks jumped to the NPBL, while the Chicago Stags, Denver Nuggets and St. Louis Bombers folded. The league went from 17 teams to 11 before the 1950–1951 season started. Midway through the 1950–1951 season, the Washington Capitols folded as well, bringing the number of teams in the league down to ten.

The National Professional Basketball League was formed around the former NBA teams, with a few other teams added in larger markets. The charter teams were, in the East Division: the Sheboygan Redskins, the Anderson Packers, the Louisville Alumnites, and the Grand Rapids Hornets. In the West Division: the Denver Refiners/Evansville Agogans, the Saint Paul Lights, the Kansas City Hi-Spots, and the Waterloo Hawks.

Former All-American George Glamack was granted a franchise by the league and, after unsuccessfully placing it in Muncie, Indiana, established the Hornets in Grand Rapids. The team compiled a record of 6 wins and 13 losses before folding, finishing in fourth place in the Eastern Division behind the leading Sheboygan Redskins.

In their short history, the Hornets had three different player/coaches — Bobby McDermott (a future Naismith Hall of Fame inductee), owner George Glamack, and Blackie Towery. On November 14, Grand Rapids played the Denver Refiners in a foul-filled game on the road in Casper, Wyoming. Several days later, McDermott was dismissed as coach of Grand Rapids due to his behavior before, during, and after the game. The NBPL ordered the ban, saying McDermott had "delayed the game by repeated profanity against the officials, and tore doors off lockers in the dressing room after the game." NBPL commissioner Doxie Moore said McDermott's behavior was "a complete disgrace of our league." Glamack assumed the coaching role until resigning on December 11, leaving Towery to coach the remaining games.

McDermott finished with a record of 1–4, Glamack with 3–6, and Towery 2–3. The team's leading scorers were Elmore Morgenthaler (15.9 ppg), Ralph O'Brien (15.2 ppg), and Buddy Cate (10.1 ppg).

The Hornets folded before the season ended, a fate shared by fellow NBPL teams Louisville Alumnites, St. Paul Lights and Kansas City Hi-Spots. Grand Rapids played its final game on December 26, 1950. On December 30, Glamack reported the Hornets were so broke they could not afford to rent its arena for a home game.

After the Hornets folded, Towery moved to Kansas City until it folded, then finished the season in Evansville. O'Brien, Morganthaler, and Cate finished their seasons with the Waterloo Hawks; O'Brien was named an NBPL first-team All-Star and Morganthaler finished with the league's ninth-best scoring average. The NBPL itself folded at season's end before the playoffs could be played.

After the demise of the Hornets, professional basketball did not return to Grand Rapids until the Grand Rapids Hoops of the Continental Basketball Association (1989–2003).

=== The arena ===
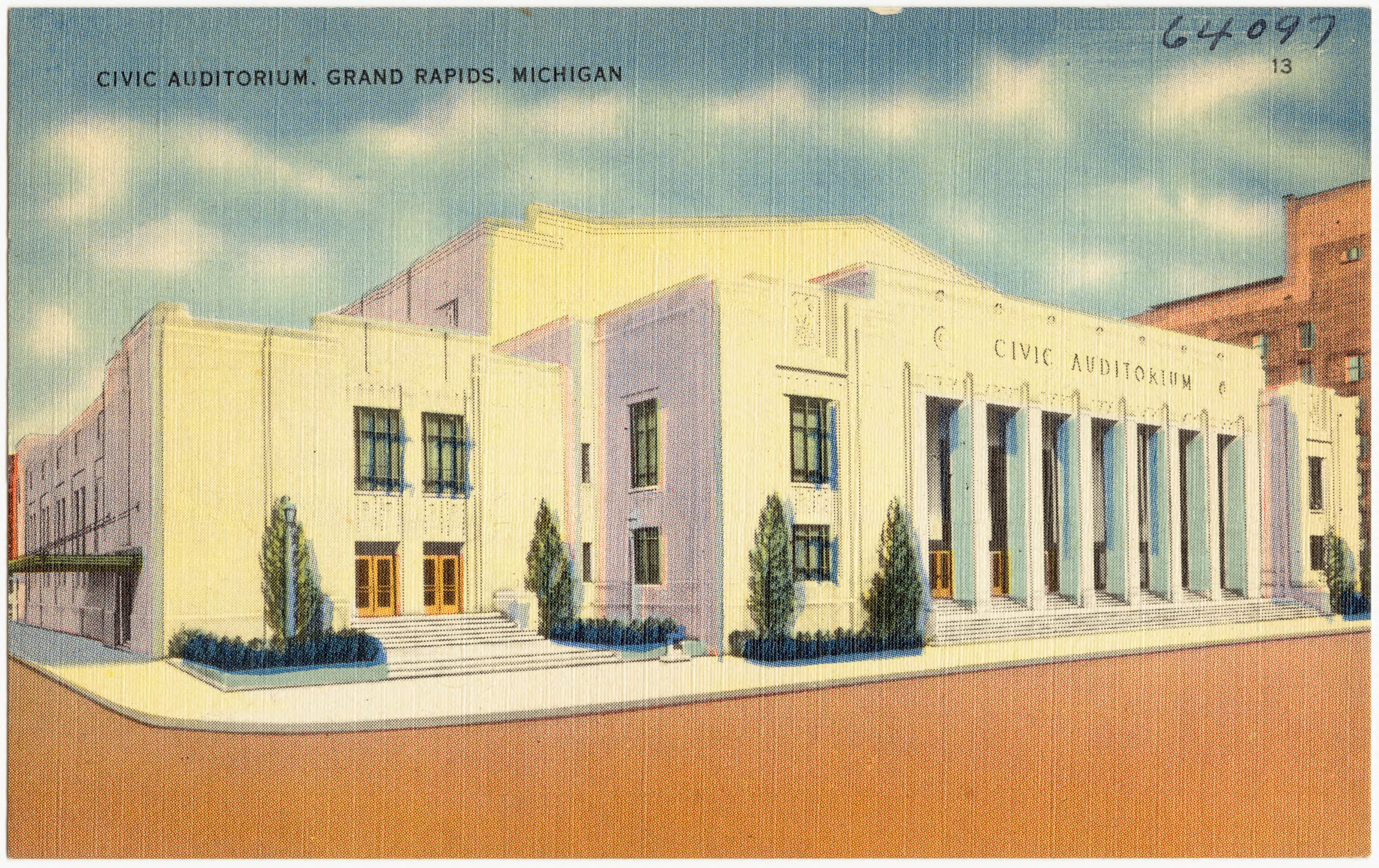
Civic Auditorium, Grand Rapids, Michigan

The Hornets played at Civic Auditorium, which still exists today. With the "Civic Auditorium" front façade and lobby remaining intact, the auditorium portion was imploded in 2003, and in February 2005 was incorporated as a part of the Steelcase Ballroom of the DeVos Place Convention Center. The address of Civic Auditorium is 303 Monroe Avenue NW, Grand Rapids, Michigan.

== Player roster ==
- Bobby McDermott, player/coach; Naismith Basketball Hall of Fame inductee
- George Glamack, owner/general manager/player
- Blackie Towery, player/coach
- Elmore Morgenthaler
- Ralph "Buckshot" O'Brien
- Leon Blevins
- Price Brookfield
- Easy Parham
- Russ DeVette
- Al Miksis
- Fritz Nagy
- Buddy Cate
- Jimmy Doyle
- Cas Ostrowski
