= Denver Refiners =

- Leagues: National Professional Basketball League (1950-1951)
- Founded: 1950
- Folded: January 29, 1951
- Arena: Denver Arena Auditorium; Thunderbird Gym, Casper, Wyoming (2 games)
- Location: Denver, Colorado

The Denver Refiners were a professional basketball team who played in Denver, Colorado, in 1950–1951 and were a member of the Western Division of the National Professional Basketball League, which lasted one season.

== History ==
The National Basketball Association contracted after the 1949–1950 season, losing six teams: The Anderson Packers, Sheboygan Red Skins and Waterloo Hawks jumped to the NPBL, while the Chicago Stags, Denver Nuggets and St. Louis Bombers folded. The league went from 17 teams to 11 before the 1950–1951 season started. Midway through the 1950–1951 season, the Washington Capitols folded as well, bringing the number of teams in the league down to ten.

The National Professional Basketball League was formed around the former NBA teams, with teams added in new larger markets. The charter teams were the East Division: Sheboygan Redskins (Former NBA), Anderson Packers (Former NBA), Louisville Alumnites and Grand Rapids Hornets. West Division: Denver Refiners/Evansville Agogans, Saint Paul Lights, Kansas City Hi-Spots and Waterloo Hawks (Former NBA).

The next season those franchises helped form the NPBL. The Denver Refiners were the Denver franchise and were coached by Jimmy Darden and had a 18–16 record through January 28, 1951. The team began the season 8–0.

The franchise had difficulty financing the team's long trips to all its eastern and midwestern counterparts. Financial pressures forced the organization to fold. A business man from Evansville, Indiana, Bill Butterfield, bought the franchise after the January 28 game and moved it to Indiana. Butterfield named the new team the Agogans, which meant "those with intense interest and excitement." The Evansville Agogans played the last six games of the season (0-6).

== The arena ==
The Refiners played on the stage of the Denver Arena Auditorium. In 1990 the building was remodeled into the Temple Hoyne Buell Theater. The site is at 14th and Arapahoe Streets, Denver, Colorado, 80204. On November 14 and November 18, 1950, the Refiners played against Grand Rapids and Sheboygan at Thunderbird Gym in Casper, Wyoming. After the November 14, 1950, game against Grand Rapids, Future Hall of Famer Bobby McDermott was dismissed as coach of Grand Rapids due to his behavior during the game, in which he cursed loudly and said his team had been "robbed."

== Notable alumni ==
- Ed Dahler
- Jimmy Darden
- Hoot Gibson
- Leo Kubiak
- Milt Schoon
- Glen Selbo
