= Saint Paul Lights =

American basketball team

St. Paul Lights
- Leagues: National Professional Basketball League
- Founded: 1950
- Folded: December 19, 1950
- Arena: St. Paul Auditorium
- Location: St. Paul, Minnesota

The St. Paul Lights were a franchise for the one season (1950) of the National Professional Basketball League, based in St. Paul, Minnesota.

== History ==
The National Basketball Association contracted after the 1949–1950 season, losing six teams: The Anderson Packers, Sheboygan Red Skins and Waterloo Hawks, all former NBL teams, jumped to the NPBL, while the Chicago Stags, Denver Nuggets and St. Louis Bombers folded. The league went from 17 teams to 11 before the 1950–1951 season started. Midway through the 1950–1951 season, the Washington Capitols folded as well, bringing the number of teams in the league down to ten.

The National Professional Basketball League was formed around the former NBA/NBL teams, with teams added in new larger markets. The charter teams were the Sheboygan Redskins (former NBA/NBL), the Anderson Packers (former NBA/NBL), the Louisville Alumnites, and the Grand Rapids Hornets, in the East Division; and in the West Division, the Denver Refiners/Evansville Agogans, the Saint Paul Lights, the Kansas City Hi-Spots, and the Waterloo Hawks (former NBA/NBL).

The St. Paul Lights of the National Professional Basketball League ended the 1950–51 season with a record of 4 wins and 19 losses, finishing third in the NPBL's West Division, behind the leading Waterloo Hawks (at 32-24, .667). Howie Schultz coached the team.

The St. Paul franchise folded before the season ended, a fate shared by the Louisville Alumnites, Kansas City Hi-Spots and Grand Rapids Hornets, playing their last game on December 19, 1950, a 76-70 win over the Waterloo Hawks.

After the Lights folded, professional basketball did not return to St. Paul. However, the Minnesota Timberwolves are a current NBA franchise in Minneapolis.

The NPBL folded after the 1950–1951 Season.

=== The arena ===
The Lights played at the St. Paul Auditorium, known today as Roy Wilkins Auditorium. Today, the arena in use as part of the RiverCentre complex, down the corridor from the Grand Casino Arena, home of the National Hockey League's Minnesota Wild. Roy Wilkins Auditorium is located at 175 W. Kellogg Boulevard, St. Paul, Minnesota.

== Notable alumni ==
- Gene Berce
- Bill Erickson
- Howie Schultz
- Joe Graboski
- Ralph Hamilton
