= Waterloo Hawks =

Former NBA basketball team in Waterloo, Iowa

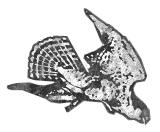
- Division: Western (1949–1950)
- Founded: 1948
- Folded: 1951
- Arena: The Hippodrome
- Location: Waterloo, Iowa
- Team colors: Black, Gold, and White
- Head coach: Charley Shipp (1948–1950); Jack Smiley (1950–1951)
- Ownership: P. L. "Pinkie" George

The Waterloo Hawks were a National Basketball League and National Basketball Association team based in Waterloo, Iowa. The Hawks remain the only sports franchise ever based in Iowa from any of the current Big Four Leagues. They are not affiliated with and have no relation to the fellow NBL turned NBA team known then (1946-1951) as the Tri-Cities Blackhawks, who are presently the Atlanta Hawks.

== Franchise history ==
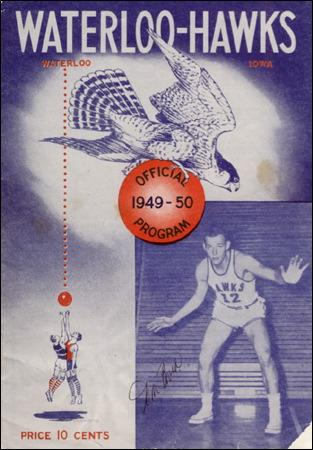
An autographed program from the Waterloo Hawks 1949–50 season.

The Waterloo Hawks were founded in 1948, playing in the National Basketball League. Originally, the Hawks were planning to play in Des Moines, Iowa, but following less than favorable enthusiasm for having a professional basketball franchise in Des Moines (potentially related to the treatment of the Waterloo Pro-Hawks from the short-lived Professional Basketball League of America, a team that also has no connection to the actual Waterloo Hawks franchise, especially since the former team couldn't come up with a team name until halftime of their first game played), the franchise would barely be approved the move to nearby Waterloo with a 5-2 vote on August 16, 1948. In 1949, the National Basketball League was absorbed by its rival, the Basketball Association of America, forming the National Basketball Association; the Hawks were thus a founding member of the NBA. When the Hawks joined the NBA properly, their roster consisted of players that previously played for the Hammond Calumet Buccaneers in the previous and final season of the NBL. In the 1949–1950 season, their first and only one in the NBA, they finished 19–43, fifth out of six in the Western Division. The Waterloo Hawks are of no relation to the current-day Atlanta Hawks franchise; at the time of Waterloo's existence in the NBA, the latter franchise was based in Moline, Illinois as the Tri-Cities Blackhawks (and moved to Milwaukee when Waterloo's franchise folded).

The National Basketball Association contracted after the 1949–1950 season. The league went from 17 teams to 11 before the 1950–1951 season started. Midway through the 1950–1951 season, the Washington Capitols folded as well, bringing the number of teams in the league down to ten.

Meanwhile, the National Professional Basketball League was formed around the former NBA teams, with teams added in new larger markets. The charter teams were the East Division: Sheboygan Red Skins (Former NBA), Anderson Packers (Former NBA), Louisville Alumnites and Grand Rapids Hornets. West Division: Denver Frontier Refiners/Evansville Agogans (with Denver previously being in the NBA as the original Denver Nuggets), Saint Paul Lights, Kansas City Hi-Spots and Waterloo Hawks (Former NBA). However, the hopeful nature of the NPBL during its only season of play would later turn into a mess for the league by the end of the season, as four or five teams would end up folding operations before the end of the season, with one team in the Denver Frontier Refiners being replaced by the Evansville Agogans near the end of the season. Not only that, but confusion on the final results for first place between Waterloo and Sheboygan (which partially stemmed from their local papers of the time in The Waterloo Courier and The Sheboygan Press both considering their respective teams the official first place team of the league that season due to them having different ideas on recording the final results for the season) combined with the NPBL's playoffs ultimately being cancelled following Sheboygan's decision to decline playing in them due to the lack of stakes involved by this point in time led to both the Red Skins and the Hawks being declared the league's champions this season. While the Hawks and Red Skins decided to try again with a new league being created in the Western Basketball League, to the point where talks of a partnership between them and the NBA occurring by October 1951, the league ultimately failed to take proper shape, which later led to the Hawks folding operations as a franchise. \

== The arena ==
The Waterloo Hawks played at The Hippodrome. The arena is still in use today and is located at 250 Ansborough Ave, Waterloo, IA 50701.

When the NBA played in Waterloo the arena is often referred to as McElroy Auditorium. The confusion stems from an NBA publication from the 1960s which erroneously listed the current name of the arena and not its historical name.

== Season-by-season records ==
NBL champions	NBA champions	Division champions	Playoff berth

Season	League	Division	Finish	Wins	Losses	Win%	GB	Playoffs	Awards
1948–49	NBL	Western	4th	30	32	.484	6		
1949–50	NBA	Western	5th	19	43	.306	20		
1950–51	NPBL	Western	1st	32	24	.571	—	—	Unofficially considered co-champions with Sheboygan.

== Waterloo Hawks all-time coaches ==
- Charley Shipp (record 8–27)
- Jack Smiley (record 11–16)

== Waterloo Hawks all-time roster ==
Player	No.	Position	Years for Hawks	School/club team
Harry Boykoff	13	Center	1949–50	St. John's
Don Boven	12	Forward	1949–50	Western Michigan
Paul Cloyd	12	Guard/Forward	1949–50	Wisconsin
Elmer Gainer	14	Forward/Center	1949–50	DePaul
Hoot Gibson	14	Forward/Center	1949–50	Creighton
Dale Hamilton	14	Guard/Forward	1949–50	Franklin College
Leo Kubiak	4	Guard	1949–50	Bowling Green
Dick Mehen	7	Forward/Center	1949–50	Tennessee
Ken Menke	??	Guard	1949–50	Illinois
Al Miksis	10	Center	1949–50	Western Illinois
Gene Ollrich	3	Guard	1949–50	Drake
Johnny Orr	9	Forward	1949–50	Beloit College
Stan Patrick	8	Guard/Forward	1949–50	Illinois
Johnny Payak	5	Guard/Forward	1949–50	Bowling Green
Jack Phelan	9	Forward	1949–50	DePaul
John Pritchard	11	Center	1949–50	Drake
Wayne See	6	Guard	1949–50	Northern Arizona
Charley Shipp	5	Guard/Forward	1949–50	Catholic
Jack Smiley	10	Guard/Forward	1949–50	Illinois
Gene Stump	??	Guard/Forward	1949–50	DePaul
Bob Tough	3	Guard/Forward	1949–50	St. John's

== See also ==
- List of defunct National Basketball Association teams
