= Evansville Agogans =

American basketball team

- Founded: 1951
- League: National Professional Basketball League 1951
- Team history: Evansville Agogans
- Based in: Evansville, Indiana
- Arena: Evansville Central High School Stadium (Current downtown Evansville YMCA Stadium)
- Colors
- Owner: Bill Butterfield
- Head coach: Gene Latham
- Championships: None

Also see: Sports in Evansville.

The Evansville Agogans were a professional basketball team who played in Evansville, Indiana, in 1951 and were a member of the Western Division of the National Professional Basketball League.

== History ==
The National Basketball Association contracted after the 1949–1950 season, dropping from 17 teams to 11. The six teams who left the NBA were the Anderson Packers, Sheboygan Red Skins and Waterloo Hawks (who jumped to the NPBL) and the Chicago Stags, Denver Nuggets and St. Louis Bombers (who folded). Midway through the 1950–1951 season, the Washington Capitols ceased operations as well, bringing the number of teams in the league down to ten.

The National Professional Basketball League was formed around the former NBA teams, with teams added in new larger markets. The charter teams were the East Division: Sheboygan Red Skins (Former NBA), Anderson Packers (Former NBA), Louisville Alumnites and Grand Rapids Hornets. West Division: Denver Refiners/Evansville Agogans, Saint Paul Lights, Kansas City Hi-Spots and Waterloo Hawks (Former NBA).

The franchise started the season as the Denver Refiners, but they had difficulty in financing the team's long trips to all its eastern and midwestern counterparts. Bill Butterfield, an office supply store manager in Evansville, bought the franchise and moved it to Indiana in January 1951. Butterfield gave the squad the unusual new name of Agogans, apparently derived from the word "agog", meaning "intense interest and excitement."

The Agogans (coached by Gene Latham) featured former local high school athletes (including Butterfield's son Bill) and others from the local Evansville Bosse High School state championship team. The team did feature a few players with professional experience (including Blackie Towery, who played for the Fort Wayne Pistons in the 1940s), but it wasn't enough, as Evansville lost all six of its regular-season contests, by an average of 22 points. (They did manage a 66–59 win over the famed Harlem Globetrotters in an exhibition game.)

The team and league folded after 1951. Evansville would not be home to another professional basketball team until the Evansville Thunder of the Continental Basketball Association was formed in 1984.

== The arena ==
Games were played at the Evansville Central High School gym, now home to the downtown Evansville YMCA.

== Notable alumni ==
- Norm McCool
- Ollie Shoaf
