= Kansas City Hi-Spots =

American basketball team

- Leagues: National Professional Basketball League
- Founded: 1950
- Folded: January 22, 1951
- Arena: Pla-Mor Ballroom
- Location: Kansas City, Missouri

The Kansas City Hi-Spots were a franchise for one season (1950-1951) in the National Professional Basketball League, based in Kansas City, Missouri.

== History ==
The National Basketball Association contracted after the 1949-1950 season, losing six teams: The Anderson Packers, Sheboygan Red Skins and Waterloo Hawks jumped to the NPBL, while the Chicago Stags, Denver Nuggets and St. Louis Bombers folded. The league went from 17 teams to 11 before the 1950-1951 season started. Midway through the 1950-1951 season, the Washington Capitols folded as well, bringing the number of teams in the league down to ten.

The National Professional Basketball League was formed around the former NBA teams, with teams added in new larger markets. The charter teams were the East Division: Sheboygan Redskins (Former NBA), Anderson Packers (Former NBA), Louisville Alumnites and Grand Rapids Hornets. West Division: Denver Refiners/Evansville Agogans, Saint Paul Lights, Kansas City Hi-Spots and Waterloo Hawks (Former NBA).

The Hi-Spots ended the 1950-51 season with a record of 4 wins and 19 losses, finishing fourth in the NPBL's West Division, behind the leading Waterloo Hawks (at 32-24, .667). Paul Cloyd (2-10) and Gene Kurash (2-5) and Bob Tough (0-4) coached the team.

The Hi-Spots actually folded before the season ended, a fate shared by the Louisville Alumnites, St. Paul Lights and Grand Rapids Hornets, playing their last game on January 22, 1951.

After the Hi-Spots folded, professional basketball did not return to Kansas City until the Kansas City Steers (1961-1963) of the American Basketball League.

The NPBL folded after the 1950-1951 Season.

=== The arena ===
The Hi-Spots played at the Pla-Mor Ballroom. It was located on the corner of Linwood and Main, at 3412 Main Street, Kansas City, Missouri. It was demolished in 1972.

== Notable alumni ==
- Jerry Fowler
- Joe Graboski
- Ralph Hamilton
