= The Waterloo-Cedar Falls Courier =

Newspaper in Waterloo, Iowa

- A sample front page of The Courier
- Type: Daily newspaper
- Format: Broadsheet
- Owner: Lee Enterprises
- Editor: Doug Hines
- General manager: David Adams
- Founded: 1859
- Language: English
- Headquarters: 6915 Chancellor Dr. Ste B Cedar Falls, IA 50613; United States
- Circulation: 10,342 Daily (as of 2023)
- Website: wcfcourier.com

The Waterloo-Cedar Falls Courier is an online newspaper that is published three times a week by Lee Enterprises for people living in Waterloo and Cedar Falls, Iowa as well as northeast Iowa.

== History ==
The first issue of The Waterloo-Cedar Falls Courier was published on November 22, 1859, by WH Hartman and George Ingersoll. The Courier changed to a daily newspaper in 1890, publishing in the afternoon every day except Saturday.

Howard Publications bought the Waterloo Courier and Cedar Falls Record in 1983. At that time, the Courier had been owned for 128 years by the same family, and had a daily circulation of around 55,000 in 1983. The circulation of The Record was about 4,000. Lee Enterprises acquired the Howard chain in 2002.
