= Anderson Packers =

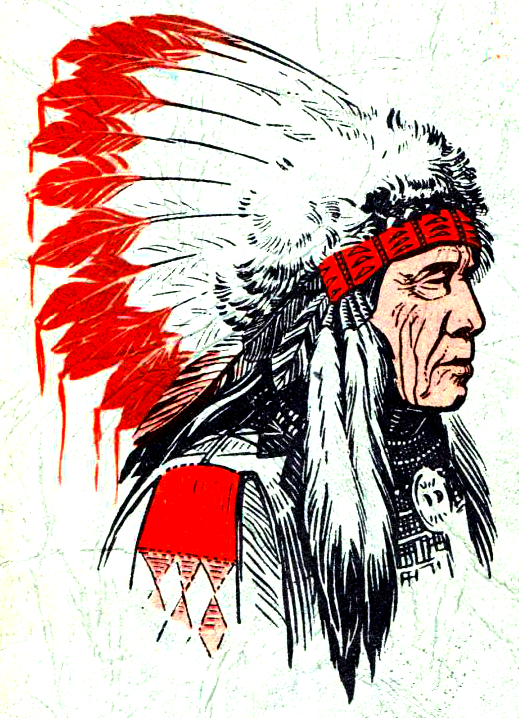
- Leagues: NBL: 1946–1949; NBA: 1949–1950; NPBL: 1950–1951
- Founded: 1946
- Folded: 1951
- History: Anderson Chiefs; 1945–46 (Independent); Anderson Duffey Packers; 1946–1949 (NBL); Anderson Packers; 1949–50 (NBA); 1950–1951 (NBPL)
- Arena: Anderson High School Wigwam (8,996)
- Location: Anderson, Indiana
- Team colors: Red, navy blue, white
- Head coach: Murray Mendenhall
- Championships: 1 NBL championship
Home	Away	Third

The Anderson Packers, also known as the Anderson Duffey Packers and the Chief Anderson Meat Packers, were a professional basketball team based in Anderson, Indiana, in the late 1940s and early 1950s.

== Franchise history ==
Before beginning play as the Anderson Packers professionally, they initially played as the Anderson Chiefs as a semipro basketball team after World War II ended, to the point of playing in the 1946 World Professional Basketball Tournament under that name. The team was originally both founded and owned by brothers Ike W. and John B. Duffey, who were the founders of the meat packing company called Duffey's Incorporated, which had purchased the Hughes-Curry Packing Co. of Anderson back in 1946, by which time the brothers rebranded the Anderson Chiefs to the Anderson Duffey Packers once they officially entered the National Basketball League (later becoming the Anderson Packers once the NBL merged with the Basketball Association of America to become the modern-day National Basketball Association). John Duffey was president of the club, while its secretary-treasurer was Ike Duffey. The team's first season in the NBL was also the league's first official season where they actually implemented a drafting system similar to what the future rivaling Basketball Association of America (and later merging partner to become the National Basketball Association) had for the eventual NBA draft system a year later following the conclusion of their inaugural league season for the purpose of controlled player salaries and limiting the idea of outbidding other players outside of their own 12-player teams at hand (with the NBL having a budget of $6,000 this season), as well as implementing key players to signing binding contracts as soon as they could and the NBL looking to have full-time referees on display. During the three short seasons Anderson played in the NBL, the Duffey Packers would see significant improvement in each season there by going from not making it to the NBL Playoffs to being in the semifinal round of the Playoffs in their second season to winning the final championship ever played there before the NBL-BAA merger of 1949 to become the modern-day NBA. The Duffey brothers profitably sold their Anderson packing plant three years later following the merger, although they retained ownership of the team until its demise in 1951 following its exit from the NBA and the subsequent closure of the failed rivaling National Professional Basketball League.

The Duffey Packers originally played professional basketball in the National Basketball League from 1946 to 1949. During that time, head coach Murray Mendenhall was named the penultimate NBL Coach of the Year and the Duffey Packers won the final NBL championship ever held. The team later rebranded themselves to just the Packers (removing the Duffey branding from their name similar to the Fort Wayne Zollner Pistons removing the Zollner part of their name when they entered the Basketball Association of America since that league didn't allow for sponsorships to be a part of team names there) once they moved into the NBL-BAA merged National Basketball Association for the 1949–50 season. The franchise withdrew from the NBA on April 11, 1950, when the organization was bought out by the newly established league and shut down its operations altogether. One of the reasons related to the Packers being bought out by the NBA related to one of the original team owners, Ike W. Duffey, dealing with poor health conditions at the time. Following that NBA season's conclusion, the original Anderson owners re-bought the team's rights from the NBA and moved the Packers to the rivaling National Professional Basketball League that was co-owned by them alongside the other NBL-turned-NBA teams that left the NBA to create the NPBL that season in the original Denver Nuggets squad, the Sheboygan Red Skins, and the Waterloo Hawks, which later folded entirely at the end of its only (1950–1951) season of play that never concluded properly due to too many of its teams folding altogether (including the original Denver Nuggets, who first went under the Denver Frontier Refiners before trying (and failing) to finish that season as the Evansville Agogans going forward), though that season was considered to be won by both Sheboygan & Waterloo that year. Due to financial issues that occurred during their only season of play in the NPBL, the Packers would end up folding operations following the conclusion of the NPBL's only season of operation.

== Season-by-season records ==
NBL champions	Division champions	Playoff berth

Anderson Packers season records
Season	League	Division	Finish	Wins	Losses	Win%	GB	Playoffs	Awards
1946–47	NBL	Western	5th	24	20	.545	4		
1947–48	NBL	Eastern	2nd^	42	18	.700	2	Won Opening Round (Syracuse) 3–0; Lost Division semifinals (Rochester) 1–2†	Murray Mendenhall (COY)
1948–49	NBL	Eastern*	1st*	49	15	.766	—	Won Division semifinals (Syracuse) 3–1; Won NBL Championship (Oshkosh) 3–0	
1949–50	NBA	Western	2nd^	37	27	.578	2	Won Division semifinals (Tri-Cities) 2–1; Won Division finals (Indianapolis) 2–1; Lost NBA Semifinals (Minneapolis) 0–2	
1950–51	NPBL	Eastern	2nd	22	22	.500	6.5		

== See also ==
- List of defunct National Basketball Association teams
