= Denver Nuggets (1948–1950) =

- Division: Western
- Leagues: Amateur Athletic Union (1932–1948; 1951–1952); Missouri Valley (1935–1940); ABL (1945–1948; 1951–1952); NBL (1948–1949); NBA (1949–1950); NPBL (1950–1951)
- Founded: 1932
- Folded: 1952
- History: Denver Piggly Wigglys; 1932–1935 (AAU); Denver Safeway Perisianas; 1935–1938 (AAU); Denver Nuggets; 1938–1940 (AAU); Denver American Legion; 1940–1943 (AAU); Denver Ambrose Jellymakers; 1943–1946 (AAU); Denver Nuggets; 1946–1948 (AAU); 1948–1949 (NBL); 1949–1950 (NBA); Denver Frontier Refiners; 1950–1951 (NPBL); Evansville Agogans; 1951 (NPBL); Denver Nuggets; 1951–1952 (AAU)
- Arena: Denver Auditorium Arena
- Location: Denver, Colorado
- Team colors: Dark blue, white
- Championships: 3 AAU tournament (1937, 1939, 1942)

The Denver Nuggets were a professional basketball team based in Denver. The Nuggets joined the National Basketball League (NBL) for the 1948–49 season, and then joined the National Basketball Association when the NBL was absorbed by the Basketball Association of America to create the NBA for the 1949–50 season. The Nuggets were the first major professional sports franchise in Colorado, but disbanded after going 11–50 in their inaugural season. This franchise is not directly connected to the current Denver Nuggets franchise of the NBA.

== History ==
The team's roots can be traced back to 1932 when the original amateur Nuggets were formed as a member of the Amateur Athletic Union (AAU) as the Denver Piggly Wigglys (sometimes shortened to the Denver Pigs and other times expanded to the Denver Safeway-Piggly Wigglys due to Safeway sponsoring (and later buying out) the team that was owned by the local Piggly Wigglys grocery store). After Safeway bought out the Piggly Wigglys franchise and had it essentially be a part of its own franchise, the Denver team was rebranded to the Denver Safeway Perisianas (sometimes shortened out to just the Denver Safeways instead) from 1935 before Safeway's sponsorship removal forced them to rebrand themselves to the Denver Nuggets for the first time in their history. Led by player-coach Jack McCracken, the Nuggets were one of the most powerful amateur athletic basketball teams in the country, winning the 1939 AAU championship and losing the 1940 championship to the Phillips 66ers. Not playing professionally, its players were given extra jobs by team sponsors. Featuring players such as McCracken, Ace Gruenig and Vince Boryla, the Nuggets continued as an AAU power throughout their existence, and the AAU has been credited by historians for helping put Denver on the national sports map. Entering the 1940s decade, the Nuggets would rebrand themselves to the Denver American Legion due to them being sponsored by American Legion until 1943 (with the Denver squad winning their third and final AAU championship in 1942 while using the American Legion name), when Ambrose Jelly took over sponsorship duties for the team and rebranded the team to the Denver Ambrose Jellymakers until 1946 when the ABL subsection in the AAU folded operations early. Despite that ABL subsection folding operations, however, the Denver team would survive by returning to the AAU properly, with them returning to the famous Denver Nuggets they used from 1938–1940 for the rest of their AAU tenure until 1948.

After the 1947–48 season, the Nuggets decided to step out of their amateur status. Rather than join the National Industrial Basketball League (NIBL), which was founded in 1947 and remained amateur, the Nuggets' general manager, Hal Davis, secured a franchise in the nine-team National Basketball League to play in the 1948–49 season. The Nuggets finished last in the Western Division in the 1948–49 season.

In the 1949–50 season, the team played in the newly-formed National Basketball Association (NBA). The Nuggets were led by player-coach Jimmy Darden, a star shooting guard who joined the Nuggets after leaving the Army as a World War II veteran in 1946. The Nuggets started the 1949–50 season with a record of 0–15, and finished the season 11–51. In 1950, the Nuggets were one of seven teams, including the Anderson Packers, Chicago Stags, Sheboygan Red Skins, St. Louis Bombers, Washington Capitols, and Waterloo Hawks, that dropped out of the National Basketball Association altogether.

Briefly, in the 1950–51 season, the Denver Frontier Refiners played in the National Professional Basketball League (NPBL), which was made up of franchises that left the NBA. That team moved to become the Evansville Agogans the last six games of the season. After the demise of the Nuggets and the Refiners, Colorado was without any major league sports teams until the American Football League's Denver Broncos began play in 1960. Despite the original Nuggets and Frontier Refiners meeting their demise as a professional team, the Nuggets would end up returning for a third and final time (coming back to their roots in the Amateur Athletic Union) for the 1951–52 season, though their return would be short-lived, as that version of the Nuggets would end up folding operations following the conclusion of the AAU's season there.

== Arena ==
The Nuggets played on the stage of the Denver Auditorium Arena.

== Legacy ==
When the Denver Rockets of the American Basketball Association (ABA) joined the NBA, a contest was held in 1974 to give the team a new nickname since the NBA already had the Houston Rockets. The Nuggets' name was selected as the moniker of the new team. In 1985, Vince Boryla joined the franchise as its president and general manager, and was awarded NBA Executive of the Year that same year. He was president and general manager of the Nuggets from 1985 to 1988. The current Denver Nuggets also started out in the same venue as the original Nuggets, the Denver Auditorium Arena, playing there from 1967 to 1975.

== Awards and honors ==
- AAU National Tournament champions: 1937, 1939, 1942

== Team record ==
NBL champions	NBA champions	Division champions	Playoff berth

Season	League	Division	Finish	Wins	Losses	Win%	GB	Playoffs	Awards
1948–49	NBL	Western	5th	18	44	.290	18	—	—
1949–50	NBA	Western	6th	11	51	.177	28	—	—

== See also ==
- Amateur Athletic Union, the first league this franchise originally played for under an amateur basis
- 1949–50 Denver Nuggets season, the only NBA season the original Denver Nuggets had
- National Professional Basketball League, the short-lived league that Denver helped find alongside three other NBL/NBA teams that left to create the NPBL
- Denver Frontier Refiners, what the team was renamed as following their move from the NBA to the NPBL
- Evansville Agogans, what they were rebranded to afterward
- Denver Nuggets, the present day rendition of the team that uses this franchise's name that formerly existed as the Denver Rockets in the American Basketball Association
