= National Professional Basketball League (1950–51) =

American professional basketball league

- Sport: Basketball
- Founded: 1950
- Folded: 1951
- Commissioner: Doxie Moore
- No. of teams: 8
- Country: United States
- Last champion: none

The National Professional Basketball League (NPBL) was a professional basketball league in the United States from 1950–51, serving as a successor league to the National Basketball League that operated from 1937 to 1949.

== History ==
The Basketball Association of America (BAA) and the National Basketball League (NBL) merged in 1949 to form the National Basketball Association. However, the NBA contracted after the 1949–50 season, losing six teams: The Anderson Packers, Sheboygan Red Skins and Waterloo Hawks jumped to the NPBL, while the Chicago Stags, Denver Nuggets and St. Louis Bombers folded. Midway through the season, the Washington Capitols folded as well, bringing the number of teams in the NBA down to ten.

The National Professional Basketball League formed around the three former NBA teams, with teams added in new larger markets. The charter teams were the Packers, Red Skins, Louisville Alumnites, and Grand Rapids Hornets in the East Division, while the Denver Refiners/Evansville Agogans, Saint Paul Lights, Kansas City Hi-Spots and Hawks made up the West Division.

The league played just one season, with Doxie Moore serving as commissioner. The Hornets, Hi-Spots, Alumnites, and Lights folded during the season, and the Refiners relocated to Evansville, Indiana to become the Evansville Agogans.

Although no championship game was staged, the Red Skins and Hawks both claimed the championship because they were both in first place in their respective divisions at the end of the season. Not only that, but both of their respective local newspapers of the time, The Sheboygan Press and the Waterloo Courier, both claimed that their respective teams won first place that season due to how both areas saw the placement of the Evansville Agogans replacing, if not taking over for, the Denver Frontier Refiners near the end of the season.

== Overall (Final) Standings ==
Both Sheboygan and Waterloo would record different final results for the remaining, surviving four teams for this season. As such, the standings for this season will contain the results of every team's final records, including the games that were retroactively considered to be "exhibition matches" by the NPBL at the time.

Eastern Division	W	L	PCT	GB
Sheboygan Redskins	29	16	0.644	–
Anderson Packers	22	22	0.500	6.5
Louisville Alumnites *	18	17	0.514	6
Grand Rapids Hornets *	6	13	0.316	10
Evansville Agogans	0	6	0.000	9.5

Western Division	W	L	PCT	GB
Waterloo Hawks	32	24	0.571	–
Denver Refiners **	18	16	0.529	6
St. Paul Lights *	12	8	0.600	2
Kansas City Hi-Spots *	4	19	0.174	11.5

Notes
* Disbanded during the season.
** Denver moved to Evansville during the season.
