= List of Atlanta Hawks seasons =

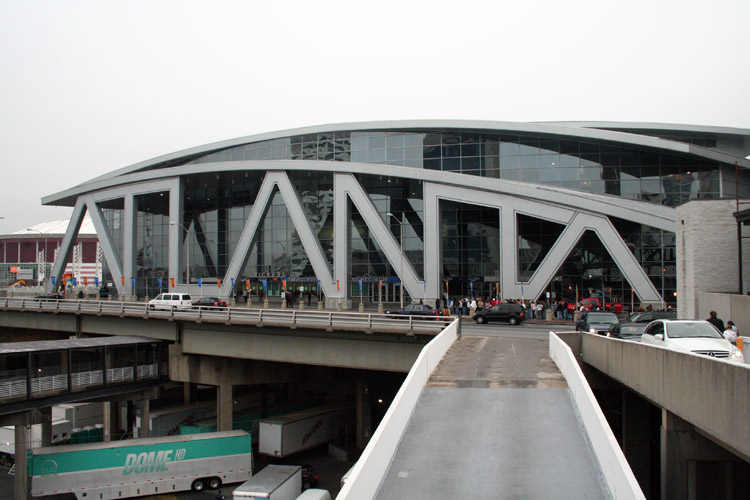
State Farm Arena has been home to the Hawks since 1999

This is a list of seasons completed by the Atlanta Hawks of the National Basketball Association (NBA). In its 75-year history, the franchise has represented the cities of Buffalo, New York (1946), Moline, Illinois (1946–51), Milwaukee, Wisconsin (1951–55), St. Louis, Missouri (1955–68) and Atlanta, Georgia (since 1968). The club played its first three seasons in the National Basketball League (NBL), which merged with the Basketball Association of America in 1949, creating the NBA.

In 71 completed NBA seasons (1949–2020), the Hawks have compiled an all-time record of 2,921–3,059 (.488), including 2,164–2,282 (.487) in Atlanta.

== Table key ==
ASG MVP	All-Star Game Most Valuable Player
COY	Coach of the Year
DPOY	Defensive Player of the Year
Finish	Final position in league or division standings
GB	Games behind first-place team in division (Note: The formula is as follows: $\mathrm{Games}\ \mathrm{behind} = \frac{(\mathrm{Team A's}\ \mathrm{wins}-\mathrm{Team B's}\ \mathrm{wins}) + (\mathrm{Team B's}\ \mathrm{losses} - \mathrm{Team A's}\ \mathrm{losses})}{\mathrm{2}}$)
L	Number of regular season losses
EOY	Executive of the Year
FMVP	Finals Most Valuable Player
JWKC	J. Walter Kennedy Citizenship
MVP	Most Valuable Player
ROY	Rookie of the Year
SIX	Sixth Man of the Year
SPOR	Sportsmanship Award
MIP	Most Improved Player Award
W	Number of regular season wins

== Seasons ==
NBA champions	Conference champions	Division champions	Playoff berth	Play-in berth

Season	League	Regular Season								Playoffs	Awards	Head coach
Season	League	Conference	Finish	Division	Finish	Wins	Losses	Win%	GB	Playoffs	Awards	Head coach
Buffalo Bisons/Tri-Cities Blackhawks
1946–47 (Note: After 13 games, the Buffalo Bisons relocated to Moline, Illinois, and were renamed Tri-Cities Blackhawks.)	NBL	—	—	Eastern	5th	19	25	.432	12			Nat Hickey
Tri-Cities Blackhawks
1947–48	NBL	—	—	Western	2nd	30	30	.500	13	Won Opening Round (Kautskys) 3–1; Lost Division semifinals (Lakers) 2–0		Nat Hickey
1948–49	NBL	—	—	Western	2nd	36	28	.563	1	Won Opening Round (Red Skins) 2–0; Lost Division semifinals (All-Stars) 3–1	Don Otten (MVP)	Bobby McDermott
1949–50 (Note: Prior to the season, the National Basketball League (NBL) merged with the Basketball Association of America (BAA), creating the National Basketball Association (NBA).)	NBA	—	—	Western	3rd	29	35	.453	10	Lost Division semifinals (Packers) 2–1		Roger Potter; Red Auerbach
1950–51	NBA	—	—	Western	5th	25	43	.368	19			Dave MacMillan; Johnny Logan; Mike Todorovich
Milwaukee Hawks
1951–52	NBA	—	—	Western	5th	17	49	.258	24			Doxie Moore
1952–53	NBA	—	—	Western	5th	27	44	.380	21.5			Andrew Levane
1953–54	NBA	—	—	Western	4th	21	51	.292	25			Andrew Lavane; Red Holzman
1954–55	NBA	—	—	Western	4th	26	46	.361	17		Bob Pettit (ROY)	Red Holzman
St. Louis Hawks
1955–56	NBA	—	—	Western	3rd	33	39	.458	4	Won Division semifinals (Lakers) 2–1; Lost Division finals (Pistons) 3–2	Bob Pettit (MVP, ASG MVP)	Red Holzman
1956–57	NBA	—	—	Western	1st	34	38	.472	—	Won Division finals (Lakers) 3–0; Lost NBA Finals (Celtics) 4–3		Red Holzman; Slater Martin; Alex Hannum
1957–58	NBA	—	—	Western	1st	41	31	.569	—	Won Division finals (Pistons) 4–1; Won NBA Finals (Celtics) 4–2	Bob Pettit (ASG MVP)	Alex Hannum
1958–59	NBA	—	—	Western	1st	49	23	.681	—	Lost Division finals (Lakers) 4–2	Bob Pettit (MVP, ASG MVP (Note: Bob Pettit shared the All-Star Game Most Valuable Player award with Elgin Baylor of the Minneapolis Lakers.))	Andy Phillip; Ed Macauley
1959–60	NBA	—	—	Western	1st	46	29	.613	—	Won Division finals (Lakers) 4–3; Lost NBA Finals (Celtics) 4–3		Ed Macauley
1960–61	NBA	—	—	Western	1st	51	28	.646	—	Won Division finals (Lakers) 4–3; Lost NBA Finals (Celtics) 4–1		Paul Seymour
1961–62	NBA	—	—	Western	4th	29	51	.363	25		Bob Pettit (ASG MVP)	Paul Seymour; Andrew Levane; Bob Pettit
1962–63	NBA	—	—	Western	2nd	48	32	.600	5	Won Division semifinals (Pistons) 3–1; Lost Division finals (Lakers) 4–3	Harry Gallatin (COY)	Harry Gallatin
1963–64	NBA	—	—	Western	2nd	46	34	.575	2	Won Division semifinals (Lakers) 3–2; Lost Division finals (Warriors) 4–3		Harry Gallatin
1964–65	NBA	—	—	Western	2nd	45	35	.563	4	Lost Division semifinals (Bullets) 3–1		Harry Gallatin; Richie Guerin
1965–66	NBA	—	—	Western	3rd	36	44	.450	9	Won Division semifinals (Bullets) 3–0; Lost Division finals (Lakers) 4–3		Richie Guerin
1966–67	NBA	—	—	Western	2nd	39	42	.481	5	Won Division semifinals (Bulls) 3–0; Lost Division finals (Warriors) 4–2		Richie Guerin
1967–68	NBA	—	—	Western	1st	56	26	.683	—	Lost Division semifinals (Warriors) 4–2	Richie Guerin (COY)	Richie Guerin
Atlanta Hawks
1968–69	NBA	—	—	Western	2nd	48	34	.585	7	Won Division semifinals (Rockets) 4–2; Lost Division finals (Lakers) 4–1		Richie Guerin
1969–70	NBA	—	—	Western	1st	48	34	.585	—	Won Division semifinals (Bulls) 4–1; Lost Division finals (Lakers) 4–0		Richie Guerin
1970–71	NBA	Eastern	5th	Central	2nd	36	46	.439	6	Lost conference semifinals (Knicks) 4–1		Richie Guerin
1971–72	NBA	Eastern	4th	Central	2nd	36	46	.439	2	Lost conference semifinals (Celtics) 4–2		Richie Guerin
1972–73	NBA	Eastern	4th	Central	2nd	46	36	.561	6	Lost conference semifinals (Celtics) 4–2		Cotton Fitzsimmons
1973–74	NBA	Eastern	5th	Central	2nd	35	47	.427	12			Cotton Fitzsimmons
1974–75	NBA	Eastern	8th	Central	4th	31	51	.378	29			Cotton Fitzsimmons
1975–76	NBA	Eastern	9th	Central	5th	29	53	.354	20			Cotton Fitzsimmons; Bumper Tormohlen
1976–77	NBA	Eastern	9th	Central	6th	31	51	.378	18			Hubie Brown
1977–78	NBA	Eastern	6th	Central	4th	41	41	.500	11	Lost First round (Bullets) 2–0	Hubie Brown (COY)	Hubie Brown
1978–79	NBA	Eastern	5th	Central	3rd	46	36	.561	2	Won First round (Rockets) 2–0; Lost conference semifinals (Bullets) 4–3		Hubie Brown
1979–80	NBA	Eastern	2nd	Central	1st	50	32	.610	—	Lost conference semifinals (76ers) 4–1		Hubie Brown
1980–81	NBA	Eastern	8th	Central	4th	31	51	.378	29			Hubie Brown; Mike Fratello
1981–82	NBA	Eastern	6th	Central	2nd	42	40	.512	13	Lost First round (76ers) 2–0		Kevin Loughery
1982–83	NBA	Eastern	6th	Central	2nd	43	39	.524	8	Lost First round (Celtics) 2–1		Kevin Loughery
1983–84	NBA	Eastern	7th	Central	3rd	40	42	.488	10	Lost First round (Bucks) 3–2		Mike Fratello
1984–85	NBA	Eastern	9th	Central	5th	34	48	.415	25			Mike Fratello
1985–86	NBA	Eastern	4th	Central	2nd	50	32	.610	7	Won First round (Pistons) 3–1; Lost conference semifinals (Celtics) 4–1	Mike Fratello (COY); Stan Kasten (EOY)	Mike Fratello
1986–87	NBA	Eastern	2nd	Central	1st	57	25	.695	—	Won First round (Pacers) 3–1; Lost conference semifinals (Pistons) 4–1	Stan Kasten (EOY)	Mike Fratello
1987–88	NBA	Eastern	4th	Central	3rd	50	32	.610	4	Won First round (Bucks) 3–2; Lost conference semifinals (Celtics) 4–3		Mike Fratello
1988–89	NBA	Eastern	4th	Central	3rd	52	30	.634	11	Lost First round (Bucks) 3–2		Mike Fratello
1989–90	NBA	Eastern	9th	Central	6th	41	41	.500	18		Doc Rivers (JWKC)	Mike Fratello
1990–91	NBA	Eastern	6th	Central	4th	43	39	.524	18	Lost First round (Pistons) 3–2		Bob Weiss
1991–92	NBA	Eastern	9th	Central	5th	38	44	.463	29			Bob Weiss
1992–93	NBA	Eastern	7th	Central	4th	43	39	.524	14	Lost First round (Bulls) 3–0		Bob Weiss
1993–94	NBA	Eastern	1st	Central	1st	57	25	.695	—	Won First round (Heat) 3–2; Lost conference semifinals (Pacers) 4–2	Lenny Wilkens (COY)	Lenny Wilkens
1994–95	NBA	Eastern	7th	Central	5th	42	40	.512	10	Lost First round (Pacers) 3–0	Joe O'Toole (JWKC)	Lenny Wilkens
1995–96	NBA	Eastern	6th	Central	4th	46	36	.561	26	Won First round (Pacers) 3–2; Lost conference semifinals (Magic) 4–1		Lenny Wilkens
1996–97	NBA	Eastern	4th	Central	2nd	56	26	.683	13	Won First round (Pistons) 3–2; Lost conference semifinals (Bulls) 4–1	Dikembe Mutombo (DPOY)	Lenny Wilkens
1997–98	NBA	Eastern	5th	Central	4th	50	32	.610	12	Lost First round (Hornets) 3–1	Dikembe Mutombo (DPOY); Alan Henderson (MIP); Steve Smith (JWKC)	Lenny Wilkens
1998–99 (Note: Due to a lockout, the season did not start until February 5, 1999, and all 29 teams played a shortened regular season schedule of 50 games.)	NBA	Eastern	4th	Central	2nd	31	19	.620	2	Won First round (Pistons) 3–2; Lost conference semifinals (Knicks) 4–0		Lenny Wilkens
1999–00	NBA	Eastern	14th	Central	7th	28	54	.341	28			Lenny Wilkens
2000–01	NBA	Eastern	13th	Central	7th	25	57	.305	27			Lon Kruger
2001–02	NBA	Eastern	12th	Central	6th	33	49	.402	17			Lon Kruger
2002–03	NBA	Eastern	11th	Central	5th	35	47	.427	15			Lon Kruger; Terry Stotts
2003–04	NBA	Eastern	12th	Central	7th	28	54	.341	33			Terry Stotts
2004–05	NBA	Eastern	15th	Southeast	5th	13	69	.159	46			Mike Woodson
2005–06	NBA	Eastern	14th	Southeast	5th	26	56	.317	26			Mike Woodson
2006–07	NBA	Eastern	13th	Southeast	5th	30	52	.366	14			Mike Woodson
2007–08	NBA	Eastern	8th	Southeast	3rd	37	45	.451	15	Lost First round (Celtics) 4–3		Mike Woodson
2008–09	NBA	Eastern	4th	Southeast	2nd	47	35	.573	12	Won First round (Heat) 4–3; Lost conference semifinals (Cavaliers) 4–0		Mike Woodson
2009–10	NBA	Eastern	3rd	Southeast	2nd	53	29	.646	6	Won First round (Bucks) 4–3; Lost conference semifinals (Magic) 4–0	Jamal Crawford (SIX)	Mike Woodson
2010–11	NBA	Eastern	5th	Southeast	3rd	44	38	.537	14	Won First round (Magic) 4–2; Lost conference semifinals (Bulls) 4–2		Larry Drew
2011–12 (Note: Due to a lockout, the season did not start until December 25, 2011, and all 30 teams played a shortened regular season schedule of 66 games.)	NBA	Eastern	5th	Southeast	2nd	40	26	.606	6	Lost First round (Celtics) 4–2		Larry Drew
2012–13	NBA	Eastern	6th	Southeast	2nd	44	38	.537	22	Lost First round (Pacers) 4–2		Larry Drew
2013–14	NBA	Eastern	8th	Southeast	4th	38	44	.463	16	Lost First round (Pacers) 4–3		Mike Budenholzer
2014–15	NBA	Eastern	1st	Southeast	1st	60	22	.732	—	Won First round (Nets) 4–2; Won conference semifinals (Wizards) 4–2; Lost conference finals (Cavaliers) 4–0	Mike Budenholzer (COY); Kyle Korver (SPOR)	Mike Budenholzer
2015–16	NBA	Eastern	4th	Southeast	2nd	48	34	.585	—	Won First round (Celtics) 4–2; Lost conference semifinals (Cavaliers) 4–0		Mike Budenholzer
2016–17	NBA	Eastern	5th	Southeast	2nd	43	39	.524	6	Lost First round (Wizards) 4–2		Mike Budenholzer
2017–18	NBA	Eastern	15th	Southeast	5th	24	58	.293	20			Mike Budenholzer
2018–19	NBA	Eastern	12th	Southeast	5th	29	53	.354	13			Lloyd Pierce
2019–20 (Note: Due to the COVID-19 pandemic, the season was suspended on March 11, 2020, ending the Hawks' season after 67 games.)	NBA	Eastern	14th	Southeast	5th	20	47	.299	34		Vince Carter (SPOR)	Lloyd Pierce
2020–21 (Note: Due to the COVID-19 pandemic, the season did not start until December 22, 2020, and all 30 teams played a shortened regular season schedule of 72 games.)	NBA	Eastern	5th	Southeast	1st	41	31	.569	8	Won First round (Knicks) 4–1; Won conference semifinals (76ers) 4–3; Lost conference finals (Bucks) 4–2		Lloyd Pierce; Nate McMillan
2021–22	NBA	Eastern	8th (Note: Earned 8th seed after beating the Cleveland Cavaliers in the NBA play-in tournament.)	Southeast	2nd	43	39	.524	10	Lost First round (Heat) 4–1		Nate McMillan
2022–23	NBA	Eastern	7th (Note: Earned 7th seed after beating the Miami Heat in the NBA play-in tournament.)	Southeast	2nd	41	41	.500	3	Lost First round (Celtics) 4–2		Nate McMillan; Joe Prunty; Quin Snyder
2023–24	NBA	Eastern	10th	Southeast	3rd	36	46	.439	28			Quin Snyder
2024–25	NBA	Eastern	9th (Note: Fell to the 9th seed after losing to the Miami Heat in the NBA play-in tournament.)	Southeast	2nd	40	42	.488	24		Dyson Daniels (MIP)	Quin Snyder
2025–26	NBA	Eastern	6th	Southeast	1st	46	36	.561	14	Lost First round (Knicks) 4–2	Nickeil Alexander-Walker (MIP)	Quin Snyder

== All-time records ==
Note: Statistics are correct as of the conclusion of the 2025–26 NBA season.

=== NBA records ===
Statistic	Wins	Losses	Win%
Tri-Cities Blackhawks regular season record (1949–1951)	54	78	.409
Milwaukee Hawks regular season record (1951–1955)	91	190	.324
St. Louis Hawks regular season record (1955–1968)	553	452	.550
Atlanta Hawks regular season record (1968–)	2,315	2,378	.493
All-time regular season record	3,013	3,088	.494
Tri-Cities Blackhawks post-season record (1949–1951)	1	2	.333
Milwaukee Hawks post-season record (1951–1955)	—	—	—
St. Louis Hawks post-season record (1955–1968)	58	55	.513
Atlanta Hawks post-season record (1968–)	111	169	.396
All-time post-season record	170	226	.429
All-time regular and post-season record	3,183	3,314	.490

=== NBL records ===
Statistic	Wins	Losses	Win%
Buffalo Bisons regular season record (1946)	5	8	.385
Tri-Cities Blackhawks regular season record (1946–1949)	80	75	.516
All-time regular season record	85	83	.506
Buffalo Bisons post-season record (1946)	—	—	—
Tri-Cities Blackhawks post-season record (1946–1949)	6	6	.500
All-time post-season record	6	6	.500
All-time regular and post-season record	91	89	.506
