= 1948–49 National Basketball League (United States) season =

1948–49 NBL season
- League: National Basketball League
- Sport: Basketball
- Duration: October 30, 1948 – March 31, 1949; April 1–13, 1949 (Playoffs); April 16–19, 1949 (Finals)
- Games: 59-64
- Teams: 9 (Unofficially 10^{note})

Regular season
- Season champions: Anderson Duffey Packers
- Top seed: Anderson Duffey Packers
- Season MVP: Don Otten (Tri-Cities)
- Top scorer: Don Otten (Tri-Cities)

Playoffs
- Eastern champions: Anderson Duffey Packers
- Eastern runners-up: Syracuse Nationals
- Western champions: Oshkosh All-Stars
- Western runners-up: Tri-Cities Blackhawks

Finals
- Venue: Anderson High School Wigwam, Anderson, Indiana; South Park School Gymnasium, Oshkosh, Wisconsin
- Champions: Anderson Duffey Packers
- Runners-up: Oshkosh All-Stars

NBL/NBA seasons
- ← 1947–48 1949–50 (NBA) →

The 1948–49 NBL season was the 14th and final overall season of the National Basketball League (NBL) in the United States. It was also the 12th and final season under that name. It previously operated as the Midwest Basketball Conference in its first two seasons. The regular season of the NBL began October 30, 1948, with a game between the Oshkosh All-Stars and the Detroit Vagabond Kings, and ran up until March 31, 1949. It concluded with a doubleheader series between the Sheboygan Red Skins and the all-black Dayton Rens team that replaced the Vagabond Kings in the middle of the season. The final NBL playoffs ran from April 1, 1949, until April 19, 1949.

The final championship series concluded with the Anderson Duffey Packers sweeping the Oshkosh All-Stars three games to none in a best-of-five series. After the series, Anderson's owners portrayed the championship as a victory for small-town teams. They argued that smaller cities like Anderson could still compete with and defeat clubs from larger markets in an everchanging professional basketball landscape. After more than a decade of operation, the NBL remained operating as a major professional basketball league alongside the older American Basketball League (ABL) and the younger Basketball Association of America (BAA). Following the season's conclusion, the NBL's leadership entered merger discussions with the BAA to help ensure the long-term survival of teams within both leagues. The talks ultimately resulted in a merger forming the National Basketball Association (NBA).

The merger that created the NBA officially began August 3, 1949, when six NBL teams—the Anderson Duffey Packers, the original Denver Nuggets, the Sheboygan Red Skins, the Syracuse Nationals, the Tri-Cities Blackhawks, and the Waterloo Hawks—joined ten of the twelve surviving BAA teams to form the NBA. The Indianapolis Olympians, who were originally planned to be an NBL expansion team for the 1949–50 season, also joined the newly merged league, which began play with 17 teams. The Oshkosh All-Stars originally were intended to join the other teams also to form an 18 team league, but the All-Stars team withdrew from the agreement before the 1949–50 NBA season began properly due, in part, to relocation concerns. Finally, the Dayton Rens and the Hammond Calumet Buccaneers would not be entered in the merger, with Dayton not being entered due to racial segregation purposes and Hammond not being entered due to a combination of financial and location concerns.

== Events of season ==
The Fort Wayne Zollner Pistons shortened their name to the Fort Wayne Pistons, and the Indianapolis Kautskys rebranded themselves as the Indianapolis Jets for the 1948–49 NBL season. This change followed the rules of the rivaling Basketball Association of America (BAA) that prohibited corporate sponsors in team names. Both Fort Wayne and Indianapolis would end up defecting to the BAA alongside the defending NBL champion Minneapolis Lakers and the Rochester Royals before the start of the 1949 BAA draft. In addition to them, both the Toledo Jeeps and the Flint/Midland Dow A.C.'s folded operations this season, which led to them being replaced by the original Denver Nuggets (an American Athletic Union team, unrelated to the modern-day NBA franchise), the Hammond Calumet Buccaneers, the Waterloo Hawks (unrelated to later Hawks NBA teams of the same name), and the Detroit Vagabond Kings. The Vagabond Kings later folded operations on December 17, 1948, with a 2–17 record and were replaced by the all-black Dayton Rens, an independently ran traveling team who were associated with the New York Renaissance. The Rens inherited Detroit's record for the remainder of the season.

Despite seeing a reduced number of teams and instability within the league, most NBL teams played the highest number of regular-season games in league history, with schedules ranging from 59 to 64 games. (Only the Detroit Vagabond Kings turned Dayton Rens would play 59 total games for this season.) The maximum total of games played exceeded that of the BAA, which played 60 games in its final regular season. Players that were in the NBL (and to a lesser extent, the BAA and even the ABL) earned average salaries of approximately $2,500–$4,000 over a six-month season. Star players could earn more money and weekly meal money was also provided.

For the final time, the league used a divisional playoff system in which the top teams received byes into the semifinal round. Due to the smaller number of teams competing in this season over prior seasons played, the first-place teams in each division–the Anderson Duffey Packers in the East and the Oshkosh All-Stars in the West–received byes, while the second and third place teams competed in best-of-three opening round match-ups. The remaining rounds were then played in a best-of-five format. The playoffs concluded with the Anderson Duffey Packers sweeping the Oshkosh All-Stars in the finals, three games to none. Following the series, Anderson ownership characterized the victory as evidence that small-market teams could still compete successfully in professional basketball.

Following the season, four teams that joined the NBA through the NBL-BAA merger–the Anderson Packers, the original Denver Nuggets, the Sheboygan Red Skins, and the Waterloo Hawks–played in the 1949–50 NBA season alongside the Syracuse Nationals and Tri-Cities Blackhawks. All four of those teams in question left the league afterward and formed the National Professional Basketball League (NPBL), a short-lived rival league similar in concept to the Chicago American Gears' earlier departure from the NBL. The Denver Nuggets briefly rebranded as the Denver Frontier Refiners before later becoming the Evansville Agogans during the NPBL's operations. Both the Blackhawks and Nationals would remain as the only teams from this season surviving in the present-day NBA, albeit as the Atlanta Hawks and the Philadelphia 76ers respectively.

== Teams ==
Eastern Division	Anderson Duffey Packers Anderson, Indiana	Detroit Vagabond Kings/Dayton Rens Detroit, Michigan/Dayton, Ohio
Eastern Division	Hammond Calumet Buccaneers Hammond, Indiana	Syracuse Nationals Syracuse, New York
Western Division	Denver Nuggets Denver, Colorado	Oshkosh All-Stars Oshkosh, Wisconsin
Western Division	Sheboygan Red Skins Sheboygan, Wisconsin	Tri-Cities Blackhawks Moline, Illinois
Western Division	Waterloo Hawks Waterloo, Iowa	

== Coaching changes ==
Coaching changes
Offseason
Team	1947–48 coach	1948–49 coach
Sheboygan Red Skins	Doxie Moore	Ken Suesens
Syracuse Nationals	Danny Biasone	Al Cervi (player-coach)
In-season
Team	Outgoing coach	Incoming coach
Detroit Vagabond Kings / Dayton Rens	Del Loranger (Detroit's player-coach)	Pop Gates (Dayton's player-coach)
Hammond Calumet Buccaneers	Bob Carpenter (player-coach)	George Sobek (player-coach)
Oshkosh All-Stars	Lon Darling; Eddie Riska (player-coach)	Gene Englund and Eddie Riska (player-coaches); Gene Englund and Walt Lautenbach (player-coaches)
Tri-Cities Blackhawks	Bobby McDermott (player-coach)	Roger Potter

== Final standings ==
=== Eastern Division ===
Pos.	Eastern Division	Wins	Losses	Win %
1	Anderson Duffey Packers	49	15	.766
2	Syracuse Nationals	40	23	.635
3	Hammond Calumet Buccaneers	21	41	.339
4	Dayton Rens^{‡}	14	26	.350
5	Detroit Vagabond Kings^{‡}	2	17	.105
^{‡} Dayton replaced Detroit, who disbanded during the season, and assumed Detroit's record in the standings for the season. Their combined record was 16–43.

=== Western Division ===
Pos.	Western Division	Wins	Losses	Win %
1	Oshkosh All-Stars	37	27	.578
2	Tri-Cities Blackhawks	36	28	.563
3	Sheboygan Red Skins	35	29	.547
4	Waterloo Hawks	30	32	.484
5	Denver Nuggets	18	44	.290

== Playoffs ==
Due to the expansion of teams entering the league in the 1946–47 season, the NBL continued to use its playoff format into its final season. The format began with a divisional opening round in which the second and third-place teams in each division competed in a best-of-three series. The winners advanced to face the first-place team in their division in the Division Semifinals. The two remaining teams then met in the NBL Championship series, the final championship round in league history.

In the opening round of each division, the Syracuse Nationals defeated the Hammond Calumet Buccaneers in a 2–0 sweep to face off against the Anderson Duffey Packers in the Eastern Division semifinals. In the Western Division, the Tri-Cities Blackhawks swept the Sheboygan Red Skins 2–0 to advance against the Oshkosh All-Stars. Neither division produced any upsets. The Anderson Duffey Packers defeated the Syracuse Nationals 3–1 in the Eastern Division Semifinals, while the Oshkosh All-Stars defeated the Tri-Cities Blackhawks by the same margin in the Western Division Semifinals. The victories set up a championship series between the Anderson Duffey Packers and the Oshkosh-All Stars.

The Anderson Duffey Packers swept the Oshkosh All-Stars 3–0 to win their only championship in their team's history. Following the season, this team was one of the six NBL franchises, along with the Indianapolis Olympians, to join the Basketball Association of America in forming the National Basketball Association. The team was subsequently renamed the Anderson Packers and competed in the 1949–50 NBA season. After leaving the NBA, the franchise joined the short-lived National Professional Basketball League (NPBL), which included several former NBL teams, but withdrew after one season due to financial and ownership-related issues.

Division Opening Round
E2	Syracuse Nationals	2
E3	Hammond Calumet Buccaneers	0
W2	Tri-Cities Blackhawks	2
W3	Sheboygan Red Skins	0

Division Semifinals
E1	Anderson Duffey Packers	3
E2	Syracuse Nationals	1
W1	Oshkosh All-Stars	3
W2	Tri-Cities Blackhawks	1

NBL Championship
E1	Anderson Duffey Packers	3
W1	Oshkosh All-Stars	0

- Bold Series winner

== Aborted World Professional Basketball Tournament ==
Due to the uncertainty of the World Professional Basketball Tournament following the potential likelihood for the merger between the National Basketball League and the younger Basketball Association of America, the original tournament organizers in Chicago, Illinois decided to avoid creating the WPBT this time around altogether. However, a different organizer in Indianapolis, Indiana highlighted by the Indianapolis News attempted to host a similar sort of tournament to make up for it instead. This planned tournament featured three of the NBL's teams from this season alongside three of the BAA's teams (potentially former NBL teams returning to the tournament or even the original Baltimore Bullets team back from the original rivaling American Basketball League), the Wilkes-Barre Barons from the original American Basketball League, and one team that remained unidentified until shortly before the seeded draw (though it was suggested the eighth team was to be the Montgomery Rebels, the regular season champions of the Southern Professional Basketball League).

While the NBL had agreed to attend alongside the Wilkes-Barre Barons of the ABL, the tournament did not come to fruition once the BAA declined the invitation. Following the official merger of the two leagues of August 3, 1949 to become the National Basketball Association, the WPBT officially ceased to exist as an alternative tournament for the new league's teams to join in as they knew it.

== Rumoured NBL Possibilities and Eventual Merger ==
Despite the smaller locations in even the newer NBL cities like Waterloo, Hammond, Denver, and Moline for what was known as the Tri-Cities region at the time, they still ended up drawing good crowds throughout the season. There were a few concerning areas in places like Dayton, Sheboygan, and Oshkosh still being in the back of the league's mind during the season. Even then, the general stability that NBL had brought about more of an overall financially positive point of view for the NBL than it did for the BAA this season (despite the larger venues and marketplaces). This resulted in interesting rumors going in both directions for the NBL's future.

On January 25, 1949, the Dayton Daily News reported from The Baltimore Sun that both the Fort Wayne Pistons and Indianapolis Jets were contemplating their potential returns into the NBL. A week after, on February 2, through Jack Carberry's "Second Guess" column for The Denver Post, he discussed interesting reports and rumors involving both of the NBL's rivaling league competitors, the younger Basketball Association of America and the older American Basketball League having some teams wanting to go into the NBL themselves. He also mentioned more recent rumors on how the Washington Capitols moved to Indianapolis in order to join the NBL while the Indianapolis Jets folded operations by the end of the season, as well as noted earlier rumors on how the Fort Wayne Pistons wanted to return to the NBL and the Minneapolis Lakers moved to Des Moines, Iowa for the following season. Following this, on February 26, the Oshkosh Daily Northwestern mentioned that the NBL had a total of eleven different locations looking to potentially enter the NBL, as in addition to the NBL potentially having the Rochester Royals and Indianapolis Jets re-enter the NBL. There would also be potential additions in Milwaukee, Wisconsin (potentially with the Oshkosh All-Stars merging operations with the Milwaukee Shooting Stars to most likely become the Milwaukee All-Stars in that case); Des Moines, Iowa; Cedar Rapids, Iowa; Baltimore, Maryland; Grand Rapids, Michigan; Cincinnati, Ohio; Louisville, Kentucky; Wilkes-Barre, Pennsylvania (likely the Wilkes-Barre Barons from the rivaling American Basketball League); and Rockford, Illinois all being seen as likely additions to join the NBL for the 1949–1950.

However, on February 11, BAA commissioner Maurice Podoloff reiterated a position he had previously told to Anderson Duffey Packers owner Ike W. Duffey in a letter to Jack Carberry that the BAA, NBL, ABL, and other minor basketball leagues should follow models similar to that of baseball and ice hockey. Podoloff posited a unified working agreement between the leagues that could eventually lead to a "World Series of basketball". A week after that note, Jack Carberry's "Second Guess" column noted that Ike W. Duffey saw no reconciliation between the NBL and the BAA possible and that it was "war to the end" between them. This was to the point where he rejected Podoloff's peace offer and noted that teams like the Boston Celtics, Chicago Stags, Indianapolis Jets, Philadelphia Warriors, Providence Steamrollers, St. Louis Bombers, and Washington Capitols could not survive beyond the following season of play. This was due to Duffey noticing a game played in Chicago which only had 353 paying customers (out of 3,000 total) to see a particular BAA match in question. He also mentioned a Philadelphia Warriors home game where fewer than 200 paid admissions were involved while the NBL had no trouble filling up their home venues in smaller home towns, with him also saying the NBL had actually saved the BAA twice the prior year between a working agreement they had (which he claimed the BAA constantly violated) and the "theft" of four of their teams this season. The same report on February 26 by the Oshkosh Daily Northwestern about the eleven potential additions to their league also mentioned the possibility of the Oshkosh All-Stars not only moving to Milwaukee, but also merging operations with an independent team called the Milwaukee Shooting Stars.

Despite that report, Maurice Podoloff briefly responded to Duffey's comments by saying the BAA was not hurting financially, though he was questioning whether he and commissioner Doxie Moore really can persuade more college seniors to join the NBL in those smaller markets over the BAA's larger teams and markets. However, the final say in the matter came from the Oshkosh All-Stars' general manager and owner, Lon Darling, a day later by saying that the NBL lasted a lot longer than the BAA due to the NBL being operated by teams whose main owners are civic organizers whose only interests are giving fans entertainment and helping advertise their cities properly to people while the BAA was interested in nothing but money, which would be prophetic in the future in many ways, but not hold much impact at the time it was said.

Rumors of uncertain league and team futures alongside potential expansion within the NBL continued to persist throughout the season, with one notable prediction on the Indianapolis Jets folding operations by the season's end coming true following the conclusion of the 1949 BAA draft. The NBL created the Indianapolis Olympians as an immediate response to the Jets' closure (with the Olympians franchise being composed mostly of players from the United States men's national basketball team that competed in the 1948 Summer Olympics in London and won the gold medal for basketball there, as well as having the players like Ralph Beard and Alex Groza owning and operating the team in the process there). However, by June 1949, it was settled by both the BAA and the NBL that they needed to have a merger occur, lest both leagues end up being ruined in the end, as while the NBL appeared to be healthier financially than the BAA this season, Ed Stanczak later revealed that Ike W. Duffey was the one trying to keep the NBL going for quite a while since he helped put up money for teams like Oshkosh, Sheboygan, and even Hammond in order to help keep them going as financially stable teams.

Finally, by August 3, despite more NBL teams being ambivalent about the merger than accepting of it at the time (with only the Blackhawks and Syracuse being committed to the merger, while Oshkosh and Dayton weren't committed themselves and the rest of the five teams favored remaining in the NBL), the NBL and BAA agreed to a merger between their leagues to form the National Basketball Association, with initial details leaving out the Indianapolis Jets and Providence Steamrollers in the BAA's end and the newer Hammond Calumet Buccaneers and all-black Dayton Rens (alongside the Oshkosh All-Stars moving to Milwaukee to potentially be the Milwaukee All-Stars instead) to have 18 teams between the two leagues for one league. Despite the All-Stars originally joining the NBA at first, they later retracted their plans on not just moving to Milwaukee, but also joining up with the other NBL teams on entering the newly created NBA, thus leaving the 1949–50 NBA season with an awkward format for 17 teams this season playing either 62, 64, or 68 games and a weird NBA Playoff format for 1950 instead of a more evenly planned out 18 team, 69–70-game season for a proper playoff format.

== Statistical leaders ==
Category	Player	Team	Stat
Points	Don Otten	Tri-Cities Blackhawks	899
Free-Throws	Don Otten	Tri-Cities Blackhawks	297
Field goals	Dick Mehen	Waterloo Hawks	315

Note: Prior to the 1969–70 NBA season, league leaders in points were determined by totals rather than averages. Also, rebounding and assist numbers were not recorded properly in the NBL like they would be in the BAA/NBA, as would field goal and free-throw shooting percentages.

== NBL awards ==
- NBL Most Valuable Player: Don Otten, Tri-Cities Blackhawks
- NBL Coach of the Year: Al Cervi, Syracuse Nationals
- NBL Rookie of the Year: Dolph Schayes, Syracuse Nationals
- All-NBL First Team:
  - F/C – Dick Mehen, Waterloo Hawks
  - F/C – Gene Englund, Oshkosh All-Stars
  - C – Don Otten, Tri-Cities Blackhawks
  - G/F – Al Cervi, Syracuse Nationals
  - G – Frank Brian, Anderson Duffey Packers
- All-NBL Second Team:
  - F – Bill Closs, Anderson Duffey Packers
  - F/C – Hoot Gibson, Denver Nuggets / Tri-Cities Blackhawks
  - C/F – Mike Todorovich, Sheboygan Red Skins
  - G/F – Whitey Von Nieda, Tri-Cities Blackhawks
  - G – Boag Johnson, Anderson Duffey Packers
- NBL All-Rookie First Team:
  - G/F – Gene Berce, Oshkosh All-Stars
  - F – Dolph Schayes, Syracuse Nationals
  - F/C – Don Ray, Tri-Cities Blackhawks
  - G – Jack Burmaster, Oshkosh All-Stars
  - G – Jimmy Darden, Denver Nuggets
- NBL All-Rookie Second Team:
  - G/F – Dee Gibson, Tri-Cities Blackhawks
  - F/C – Alex Hannum, Oshkosh All-Stars
  - C – Ed Peterson, Syracuse Nationals
  - G – Leo Kubiak, Waterloo Hawks
  - G – Billy Gabor, Syracuse Nationals

== See also ==
- National Basketball League (United States)
- 1948–49 BAA season, the rivaling season of what would eventually be their merging partner to form the National Basketball Association
- 1949–50 NBA season, the joint collaborative season between the National Basketball League and the younger Basketball Association of America
