= Warren Perkins =

American basketball player

Personal information
- Born: February 2, 1922 New Orleans, Louisiana, U.S.
- Died: September 12, 2014 (aged 92) New Orleans, Louisiana, U.S.
- Listed height: 6 ft 3 in (1.91 m)
- Listed weight: 190 lb (86 kg)

Career information
- High school: Warren Easton (New Orleans, Louisiana)
- College: Tulane (1946–1949)
- NBA draft: 1949: 4th round, –
- Drafted by: Providence Steamrollers
- Playing career: 1949–1951
- Position: Shooting guard / small forward
- Number: 7, 11

Career history
- 1949–1951: Tri-Cities Blackhawks

Career highlights
- Third-team All-SEC (1949)

Career NBA statistics
- Points: 767 (6.1 ppg)
- Rebounds: 319 (4.8 rpg)
- Assists: 257 (2.0 apg)
- Stats at NBA.com
- Stats at Basketball Reference

Warren Charles "Red" Perkins (February 2, 1922 – September 12, 2014) was an American professional basketball player. Perkins was selected in the fourth round of the 1949 BAA draft by the Providence Steamrollers after a collegiate career at Tulane. He played for two seasons in the National Basketball Association, both of which were for the Tri-Cities Blackhawks. He attended Warren Easton High School.

Warren's career high in points was against the Indianapolis Olympians on February 2, 1951, where he scored 21 points in a 98–91 win.

Warren played in a total of two playoff games, against the Anderson Packers, and scored two total points.

Some of his teammates included the likes of Jack Nichols, Dike Eddleman, and Frankie Brian, who all averaged over 10 points in the 1950–51 season.

== Military service ==
During World War II, Perkins served in the United States Army Air Forces and was stationed in the United States.

== Career statistics ==
Legend
GP	Games played	GS	Games started	MPG	Minutes per game
FG%	Field goal percentage	3P%	3-point field goal percentage	FT%	Free throw percentage
RPG	Rebounds per game	APG	Assists per game	SPG	Steals per game
BPG	Blocks per game	PPG	Points per game	**Bold**	Career high

=== Regular season ===
Year	Team	GP	FG%	FT%	RPG	APG	PPG
1949–50	Tri-Cities	60	.303	.590	–	1.9	**6.2**
1950–51	Tri-Cities	**66**	**.315**	**.646**	4.8	**2.2**	6.0
Career		126	.309	.618	4.8	2.0	6.1

=== Playoffs ===
Year	Team	GP	FG%	FT%	APG	PPG
1950	Tri-Cities	2	1.000	–	.0	1.0
