= 1948 NCAA Men's Basketball All-Americans =

- Awarded for: 1947–48 NCAA men's basketball season

The consensus 1948 College Basketball All-American team, as determined by aggregating the results of three major All-American teams. To earn "consensus" status, a player must win honors from a majority of the following teams: the Associated Press, the Helms Athletic Foundation, and Converse.

== 1948 Consensus All-America team ==
Consensus First Team
Player	Position	Class	Team
Ralph Beard	G	Junior	Kentucky
Ed Macauley	F	Junior	Saint Louis
Jim McIntyre	C	Junior	Minnesota
Kevin O'Shea	G	Sophomore	Notre Dame
Murray Wier	G	Senior	Iowa

Consensus Second Team
Player	Position	Class	Team
Dick Dickey	F	Sophomore	NC State
Arnie Ferrin	F	Senior	Utah
Alex Groza	C	Junior	Kentucky
Hal Haskins	F/G	Sophomore	Hamline
George Kaftan	F	Senior	Holy Cross
Duane Klueh	G	Junior	Indiana State
Tony Lavelli	F	Junior	Yale
Jack Nichols	C	Senior	Washington
Andy Wolfe	G/F	Senior	California

== Individual All-America teams ==
All-America Team
All-America Team	First team		Second team		Third team		Fourth team	
All-America Team	Player	School	Player	School	Player	School	Player	School
Associated Press	Ralph Beard	Kentucky	Dwight Eddleman	Illinois	A. L. Bennett	Oklahoma A&M	Walt Budko	Columbia
Associated Press	Ed Macauley	Saint Louis	Arnie Ferrin	Utah	Bob Cousy	Holy Cross	Ed Mikan	DePaul
Associated Press	Jim McIntyre	Minnesota	Alex Groza	Kentucky	Dick Dickey	NC State	Jackie Robinson	Baylor
Associated Press	Kevin O'Shea	Notre Dame	George Kaftan	Holy Cross	Donnie Forman	NYU	Dolph Schayes	NYU
Associated Press	Murray Wier	Iowa	Tony Lavelli	Yale	George Kok	Arkansas	Ernie Vandeweghe	Colgate
Helms	Ralph Beard	Kentucky	A. L. Bennett	Oklahoma A&M	Ed Beach	West Virginia	No fourth team	
Helms	Dick Dickey	NC State	Pete Elliott	Michigan	Walt Budko	Columbia	No fourth team	
Helms	Arnie Ferrin	Utah	Bob Gale	Cornell	Bob Cope	Montana	No fourth team	
Helms	Duane Klueh	Indiana State	Alex Groza	Kentucky	Paul Courty	Oklahoma	No fourth team	
Helms	Tony Lavelli	Yale	George Kaftan	Holy Cross	Hal Haskins	Hamline	No fourth team	
Helms	Ed Macauley	Saint Louis	Jim McIntyre	Minnesota	Frank Kudelka	Saint Mary's	No fourth team	
Helms	Jack Nichols	Washington	Joe Nelson	Brigham Young	Slater Martin	Texas	No fourth team	
Helms	Kevin O'Shea	Notre Dame	Don Ray	Western Kentucky	Ed Mikan	DePaul	No fourth team	
Helms	Murray Wier	Iowa	Jackie Robinson	Baylor	Dolph Schayes	NYU	No fourth team	
Helms	Andy Wolfe	California	Howie Shannon	Kansas State	Andy Tonkovich	Marshall	No fourth team	
Converse	Ralph Beard	Kentucky	Dick Dickey	NC State	Dwight Eddleman	Illinois	No fourth team	
Converse	Alex Groza	Kentucky	Tony Lavelli	Yale	Vern Gardner	Utah	No fourth team	
Converse	Hal Haskins	Hamline	Ed Macauley	Saint Louis	Wallace Jones	Kentucky	No fourth team	
Converse	George Kaftan	Holy Cross	Mickey Marty	Loras	Murray Wier	Iowa	No fourth team	
Converse	Kevin O'Shea	Notre Dame	Odie Spears	Western Kentucky	Andy Wolfe	California	No fourth team	

AP Honorable Mention:

- Billy Joe Adcock, Vanderbilt
- Cliff Barker, Kentucky
- Leo Barnhorst, Notre Dame
- Edward Bartels, NC State
- Gene Berce, Marquette
- Nelson Bobb, Temple
- Bob Brannum, Michigan State
- Clarence Brannum, Kansas State
- Jack Burmaster, Illinois
- Leland Byrd, West Virginia
- Bobby Cook, Wisconsin
- Cliff Crandall, Oregon State
- Nate DeLong, River Falls Teachers
- Pete Elliott, Michigan
- Billy Gabor, Syracuse
- Vern Gardner, Utah
- Dee Gibson, Western Kentucky
- Tom Hamilton, Texas
- Chuck Hanger, California
- Norm Hankins, Lawrence Tech
- Bob Harris, Oklahoma A&M
- Paul Horvath, NC State
- Harold Howey, Kansas State
- Dave Humerickhouse, Bradley
- Gene James, Marshall
- Wallace Jones, Kentucky
- Leo Katkaveck, NC State
- Frank Kudelka, Saint Mary's
- Ed Lerner, Temple
- Ray Lumpp, NYU
- Al Madsen, Texas
- Slater Martin, Texas
- Mickey Marty, Loras
- Dick McGuire, St. John's
- Dave Minor, UCLA
- Joe Nelson, Brigham Young
- Jack Nichols, Washington
- Bob Paxton, North Carolina
- Warren Perkins, Tulane
- Dan Pippin, Missouri
- Kenny Rollins, Kentucky
- Frank Saul, Seton Hall
- Fred Schaus, West Virginia
- Otto Schnellbacher, Kansas
- Jack Spencer, Iowa
- John Stanich, UCLA
- Andy Tonkovich, Marshall
- Paul Unruh, Bradley
- Paul Walther, Tennessee
- Andy Wolfe, California

== See also ==
- 1947–48 NCAA men's basketball season
