= 1949–50 Washington Capitols season =

American basketball season

- Head coach: Bob Feerick
- Owner: Mike Uline
- Arena: Uline Arena

Results
- Record: 32–36 (.471)
- Place: Division: 3rd (Eastern)
- Playoff finish: Division semifinals (eliminated 0-2)
- Stats at Basketball Reference
- Radio: WWDC

The 1949–50 Washington Capitols season was the fourth season of the Washington Capitols in the National Basketball Association (NBA). It would also be the first season where the team would be without the legendary Red Auerbach as the head coach, as he would leave the team following the Capitols' failure to secure a long-term deal out of him. This season would be the only full season where the Capitols finished their season with a losing record. Despite that fact, however, they would still qualify for the 1950 NBA playoffs due to them being the third-best team in the Eastern Division that season behind only the New York Knicks and the newly-added Syracuse Nationals from the former National Basketball League. However, the Capitols would fail to win a single playoff game this time around, as they would be swept by the Knicks in the Eastern Division Semifinal Round.

== BAA/NBA draft ==
Round	Pick	Player	Position	Nationality	School/Club team
1	8	Wallace Jones	F	United States	Kentucky
2	–	Red Owens	–	United States	Baylor
3	–	Cliff Barker	G	United States	Kentucky

== Roster ==
1949–50 Washington Capitols roster
Players

Pos.	No.	Player	Height	Weight	DOB	From
F	22	Hook Dillon	6 ft 3 in (1.91 m)	180 lb (82 kg)		North Carolina
G/F	10	Bob Feerick	6 ft 3 in (1.91 m)	190 lb (86 kg)		Santa Clara
F/C	11	Chuck Gilmur	6 ft 4 in (1.93 m)	225 lb (102 kg)		Washington
C	14	Chick Halbert	6 ft 9 in (2.06 m)	225 lb (102 kg)		West Texas A&M
G	23	Leo Katkaveck	6 ft 0 in (1.83 m)	185 lb (84 kg)		NC State
F/C	12	John Mandic	6 ft 4 in (1.93 m)	205 lb (93 kg)		Oregon State
F/C	17	Bones McKinney	6 ft 6 in (1.98 m)	185 lb (84 kg)		North Carolina
F/C	15	Jack Nichols	6 ft 7 in (2.01 m)	222 lb (101 kg)		Washington
F		Johnny Norlander	6 ft 3 in (1.91 m)	180 lb (82 kg)		Hamline
G/F	13	Dick O'Keefe	6 ft 2 in (1.88 m)	185 lb (84 kg)		Santa Clara
C	15	Don Otten	6 ft 10 in (2.08 m)	240 lb (109 kg)		Bowling Green
G/F	29	Chick Reiser	5 ft 11 in (1.80 m)	165 lb (75 kg)		NYU
G/F	22	Dick Schulz	6 ft 2 in (1.88 m)	192 lb (87 kg)		Wisconsin
G	20	Fred Scolari	5 ft 10 in (1.78 m)	180 lb (82 kg)		San Francisco

Coaches
Head coach
- Bob Feerick

Legend
- (DP) Unsigned draft pick
- (FA) Free agent
- (S) Suspended
- Injured

== Regular season ==
=== Season standings ===
Eastern Division	W	L	PCT	GB	Home	Road	Neutral	Div
x-Syracuse Nationals	51	13	.797	–	31–1	15–12	5–0	9–1
x-New York Knicks	40	28	.588	13	19–10	18–16	3–2	20–6
x-Washington Capitols	32	36	.471	21	21–13	10–20	1–3	13–13
x-Philadelphia Warriors	26	42	.382	25	15–15	8–23	3–4	9–17
Baltimore Bullets	25	43	.368	26	16–15	8–25	1–3	8–18
Boston Celtics	22	46	.324	29	12–14	5–28	5–4	11–15

== Game log ==
1949–50 game log
Total: 32–36
November

Game	Date	Team	Score	High points	Location Attendance	Record
1	November 2	Baltimore	W 66–61	Jack Nichols (14)		1–0
2	November 5	St. Louis	W 81–69	Jack Nichols (18)		2–0
3	November 8	Minneapolis	L 66–68	Jack Nichols (19)		2–1
4	November 9	at Philadelphia	W 84–69	Fred Scolari (15)		3–1
5	November 10	at Baltimore	W 88–72	Fred Scolari (24)		4–1
6	November 12	Boston	L 68–76	Jack Nichols (21)		4–2
7	November 15	vs Chicago	L 63–77	Jack Nichols (31)		4–3
8	November 16	Denver	W 99–90	Dick O'Keefe (19)		5–3
9	November 19	Chicago	W 85–69	Jack Nichols (20)		6–3
10	November 22	New York	L 74–89	Jack Nichols (17)		6–4
11	November 23	at New York	L 67–87	Chick Halbert (13)		6–5
12	November 26	Fort Wayne	W 93–76	Fred Scolari (25)		7–5
13	November 30	Rochester	L 84–86	Jack Nichols (26)		7–6

December

Game	Date	Team	Score	High points	Location Attendance	Record
14	December 3	Philadelphia	W 79–63	Fred Scolari (20)		8–6
15	December 4	at Fort Wayne	L 68–72	Reiser, Scolari (11)		8–7
16	December 6	at Chicago	L 55–75	Fred Scolari (15)		8–8
17	December 7	at Minneapolis	L 76–93	Bones McKinney (16)		8–9
18	December 10	Fort Wayne	W 75–69	Chick Reiser (13)		9–9
19	December 14	St. Louis	W 79–61	Johnny Norlander (15)		10–9
20	December 17	Baltimore	L 72–89	Chick Reiser (18)		10–10
21	December 21	Minneapolis	L 61–75	Jack Nichols (22)		10–11
22	December 22	at Baltimore	L 82–86	Bones McKinney (20)		10–12
23	December 23	Boston	W 86–73	Fred Scolari (20)		11–12
24	December 25	at St. Louis	W 81–68	Fred Scolari (19)		12–12
25	December 26	at Anderson	L 73–80	Jack Nichols (22)		12–13
26	December 27	at Rochester	L 72–96	Leo Katkaveck (15)		12–14
27	December 28	Syracuse	W 87–85	Jack Nichols (27)		13–14
28	December 31	New York	W 70–64	Bones McKinney (16)		14–14

January

Game	Date	Team	Score	High points	Location Attendance	Record
29	January 1	at Syracuse	L 73–79	Leo Katkaveck (15)		14–15
30	January 3	at Rochester	L 79–83	Bones McKinney (21)		14–16
31	January 4	Rochester	L 63–72	Jack Nichols (20)		14–17
32	January 7	Waterloo	W 101–83	Jack Nichols (19)		15–17
33	January 10	Chicago	W 86–71	Fred Scolari (17)		16–17
34	January 11	at New York	L 72–73	Fred Scolari (21)		16–18
35	January 13	at Philadelphia	W 77–67	Bones McKinney (17)		17–18
36	January 14	Philadelphia	W 78–70	Jack Nichols (18)		18–18
37	January 18	Minneapolis	L 68–76	Jack Nichols (22)		18–19
38	January 19	at Baltimore	W 81–68	Chick Reiser (19)		19–19
39	January 21	Sheboygan	L 82–88	Dick O'Keefe (22)		19–20
40	January 22	at Fort Wayne	L 70–82	Chick Reiser (16)		19–21
41	January 24	vs St. Louis	W 75–67	Fred Scolari (15)		20–21
42	January 25	at Tri-Cities	W 65–62	Bob Feerick (16)		21–21
43	January 26	at St. Louis	W 82–71	Fred Scolari (30)		22–21
44	January 29	at Minneapolis	L 60–88	Fred Scolari (13)		22–22
45	January 31	at Denver	W 88–78	Jack Nichols (22)		23–22

February

Game	Date	Team	Score	High points	Location Attendance	Record
46	February 2	at Sheboygan	L 65–68	Jack Nichols (17)		23–23
47	February 4	New York	L 71–76	Fred Scolari (18)		23–24
48	February 7	at Indianapolis	L 81–88	Fred Scolari (14)		23–25
49	February 8	at Waterloo	L 70–77	Fred Scolari (16)		23–26
50	February 9	at Minneapolis	L 59–71	Bob Feerick (15)		23–27
51	February 11	Anderson	W 81–69	Fred Scolari (16)		24–27
52	February 15	Tri-Cities	L 81–85	Fred Scolari (24)		24–28
53	February 18	Indianapolis	W 81–79	Don Otten (21)		25–28
54	February 21	at Rochester	L 76–84	Don Otten (21)		25–29
55	February 22	at New York	L 81–89	Don Otten (17)		25–30
56	February 24	at Boston	L 74–89	Chuck Gilmur (18)		25–31
57	February 25	Philadelphia	L 80–92	Don Otten (22)		25–32
58	February 26	at Fort Wayne	W 81–78	Dick O'Keefe (24)		26–32

March

Game	Date	Team	Score	High points	Location Attendance	Record
59	March 1	vs Chicago	L 75–76	Don Otten (23)		26–33
60	March 2	Chicago	W 91–88	Fred Scolari (28)		27–33
61	March 4	Boston	W 95–75	Fred Scolari (17)		28–33
62	March 7	vs Boston	L 64–75	Leo Katkaveck (14)		28–34
63	March 8	Baltimore	W 88–80	Chick Reiser (18)		29–34
64	March 10	at Boston	W 76–66	Don Otten (17)		30–34
65	March 11	St. Louis	W 92–90	Chick Reiser (17)		31–34
66	March 15	Rochester	L 64–93	Gilmur, Scolari (15)		31–35
67	March 17	at Philadelphia	L 59–85	Chick Reiser (12)		31–36
68	March 18	Fort Wayne	W 82–76	Chick Reiser (18)		32–36

== NBA Playoffs ==
=== NBA Eastern Division Semifinals ===
(2) New York Knicks vs. (3) Washington Capitols: Knicks win series 2-0

- Game 1 @ Washington (March 21): New York 90, Washington 87
- Game 2 @ New York (March 22): New York 103, Washington 83

Last playoff meeting: 1949 BAA Eastern Division Finals (Washington won 2–1)
