= Wharton Field House =

Arena in Moline, Illinois

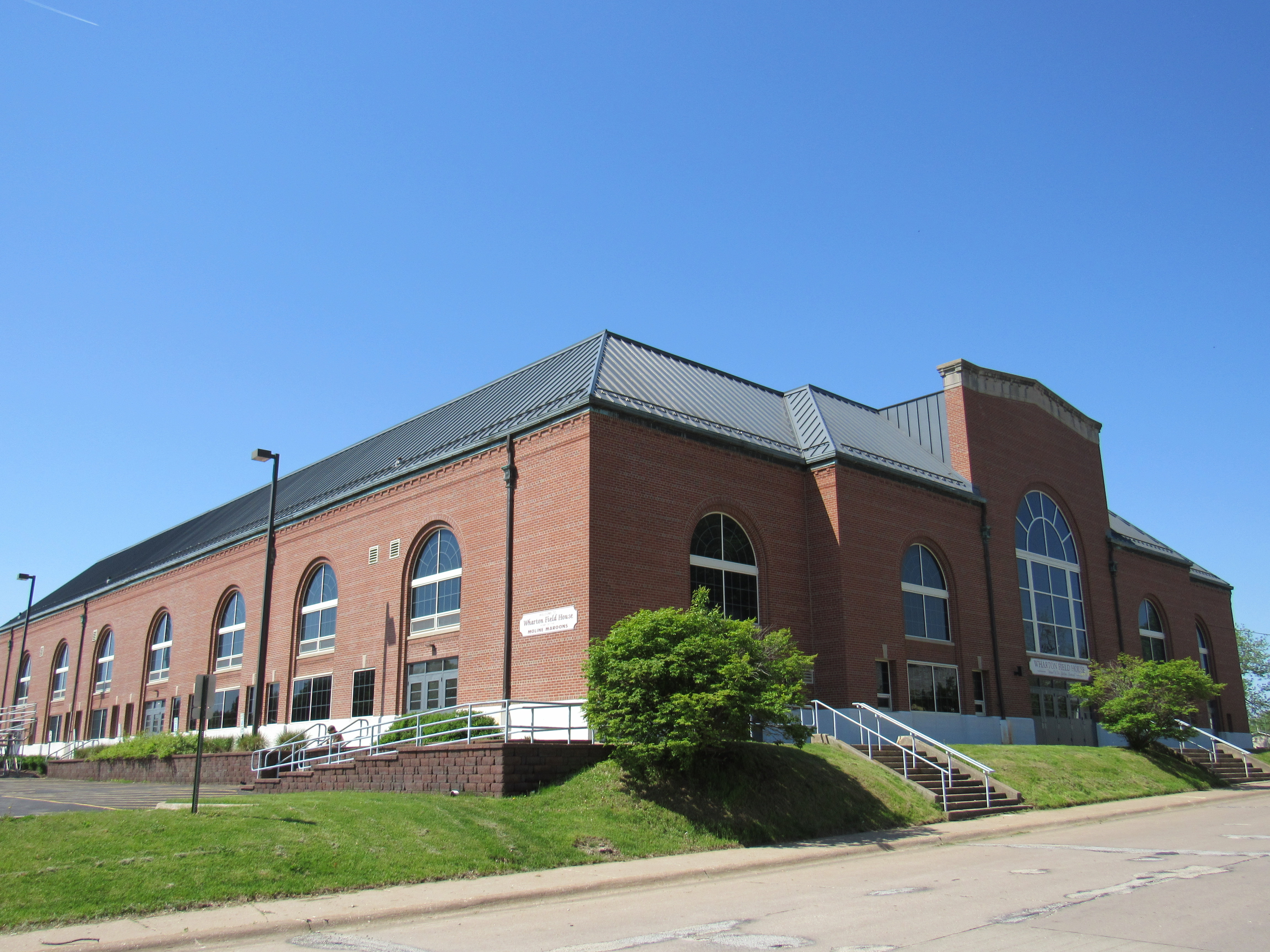
- Wharton Field House in 2017
- Interactive map of Wharton Field House
- Address: 1800 20th Avenue
- Location: Moline, Illinois
- Coordinates: 41.4918315°N 90.5106068°W
- Capacity: Basketball: 7,250; Volleyball: 6,075; Graduation ceremony: 7,300
- Public transit: Quad Cities MetroLINK

Construction
- Opened: December 21, 1928

Tenants
- Tri-Cities Blackhawks (NBL/NBA) (1946–1951); Quad City Thunder (CBA) (1987–1993); Quad City Riverhawks (PBL) (2008); Moline Maroons (Western Big 6) (1928–present)

Wharton Field House is a historic arena located at 1800 20th Avenue in Moline, Illinois. It opened in 1928 and was home to the NBA's Tri-Cities Blackhawks, today's Atlanta Hawks, from 1946 to 1951. It has hosted professional teams, high school teams, concerts, and other events in its history. The approximately 7,000 seat Field House is adjacent to Browning Field, which has served as a baseball, football and track venue. Today, both Wharton Field House and Browing Field continue to serve as the home for Moline High School athletic teams. In 2004, USA Today named Wharton Field House one of the top places to watch high school basketball.

== Venue history ==
The building is named for Theodore Finley Wharton. In the 1920s, Wharton was President of the Moline High School Athletic Booster Club and organized a group, the Maroon and White Association, to raise funds for construction of a field house. The field house would be adjacent to Browning Field (opened 1912) and host Moline Maroon teams. The Maroon and White Association eventually raised the necessary total of $175,000, aided by the sale of 620 $50 bonds, 100 $100 bonds and numerous bonds of higher value. The building was designed by local architect William Schulzke and completed in 1928. Originally named Moline Field House, it was renamed after Wharton in 1941.

The facility opened with a basketball game between Moline High School and Kewanee High School on December 21, 1928.

The facility received a new floor surface in 2015. The original floor had remained in place from 1928 until 1997, when it was first replaced. 7000 square feet of flooring was installed with mechanical ventilation.

== National Basketball Association ==
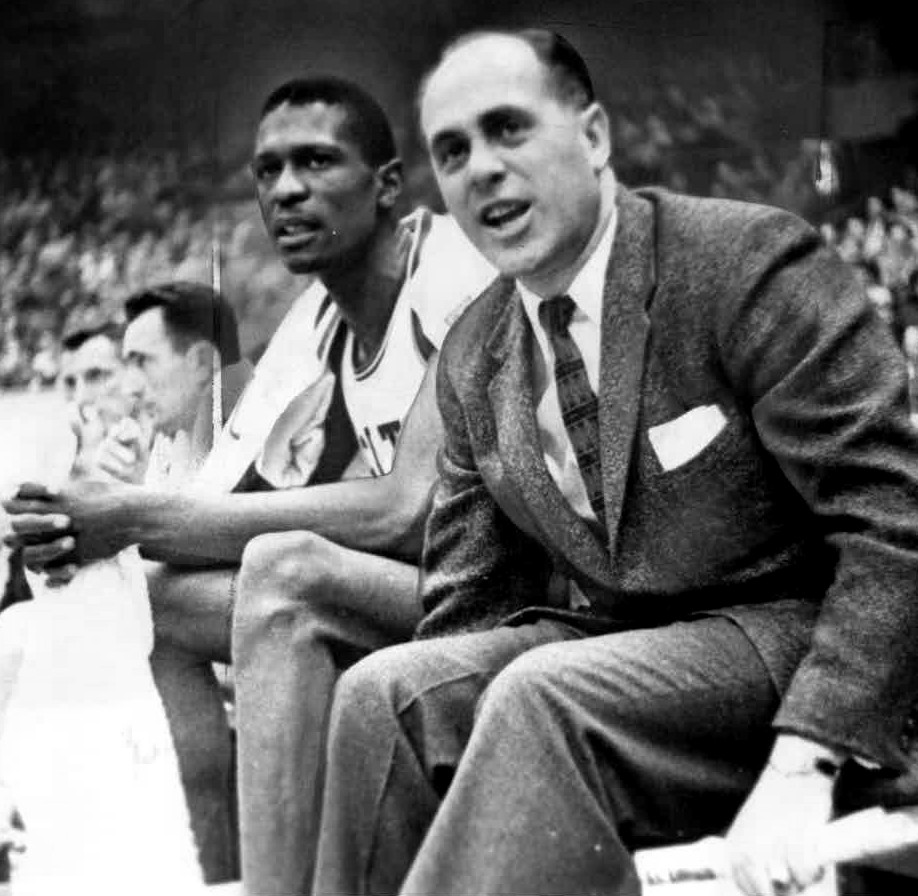
Red Auerbach (with Bill Russell) 1956

Wharton Field House was an early home to the team that is today's Atlanta Hawks, as well as a coaching stop of legendary coach Red Auerbach. Wharton Field House was home to the National Basketball League's Tri-Cities Blackhawks from 1946 until 1951. Under owners Leo Ferris and Ben Kerner, the franchise started in 1946 as the Buffalo Bisons, before relocating mid-season to the Tri-Cities (now called Quad Cities) area after only 13 total games. The NBL merged with the Basketball Association of America to form the NBA in 1949. Naismith Basketball Hall of Fame player William Pop Gates was on the 1946–47 Blackhawks, helping to integrate the league. Gates would become the first African-American coach in a major league in 1948. Don Otten was league MVP for the Blackhawks in 1947–48. In 1950, Kerner drafted Naismith Memorial Basketball Hall of Fame player Bob Cousy in the 1st round (#4). Cousy was reportedly unhappy to go to a small market and demanded $10,000 to sign with the Blackhawks. Kerner countered with $6,000 and then sold Cousy to the Chicago Stags, which folded soon afterwards, ultimately resulting in Cousy being signed by the Boston Celtics. Cousy would play in 13 consecutive All-Star games, win MVP honors in 1957 and play point guard on six championship Celtic teams. After a 24–44 season in 1950–51, Kerner relocated the franchise to a larger market and the team became the Milwaukee Hawks. Two-time NBA All-Star Frankie Brian was the leading scorer on the 1950–51 Hawks during their last season in Moline. Eventually Kerner moved the Milwaukee Hawks to St. Louis in 1955. The Hawks would eventually settle in Atlanta in 1968 when Kerner sold the franchise.

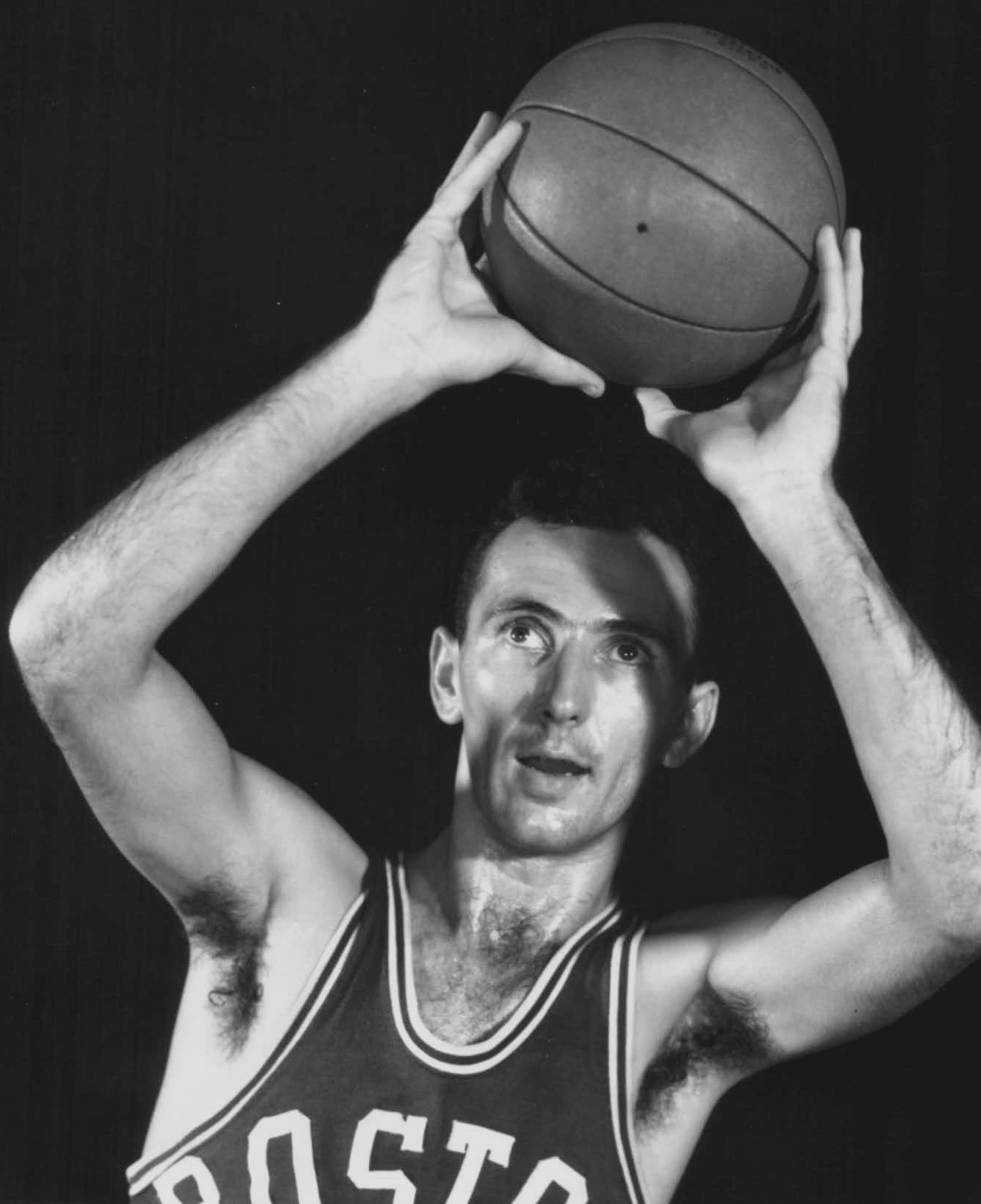
1957 MVP, six-time NBA champion Bob Cousy

Local Moline High School basketball coach Roger Potter coached the Blackhawks briefly before being replaced by Red Auerbach. Auerbach was hired by Ben Kerner as head coach for the Blackhawks in 1949, but quit when he discovered that Kerner had traded a player without consulting him. Auerbach became Coach of the Boston Celtics in 1951–52. In Boston, Auerbach coached the Celtics to nine NBA titles, won 938 games and coached numerous Hall of Fame players. Auerbach later served as Boston's general manager, (drafting Larry Bird, Kevin McHale and others) building seven more NBA championship teams. Auerbach's 28–29 record with the Blackhawks was the only losing season and non-playoff season of his 20-year coaching career.

== Continental Basketball Association ==
Wharton would serve as home to another professional basketball team, as the Quad City Thunder of the CBA played at Wharton Field House from 1987 until 1993. In 1993 the Thunder moved to the new MARK of the Quad Cities (now known as Vibrant Arena) in downtown Moline. Various future and past NBA players had tenure with the Thunder at Wharton, including Hall of Fame player George Gervin. and Illini great Kenny Battle. Local players Brent Carmichael (United Township), Tony Karasek (United Township), Troy Muilenberg (Davenport West), and Blake Wortham (Rock Island) all played for the Thunder during the Wharton era.

Wharton Field House is the current and longtime home of the Moline Maroons basketball and volleyball teams. Moline High School is a member of the Western Big 6 Conference. The Moline High School graduation ceremony is held at Wharton Field House.

== Cultural influence ==
Wharton Field House and Browning Field were the subject of a 2013 book A Century of Players, Performers, and Pageants: Wharton Field House and Browning Field, Moline, Illinois, by Curtis C. Roseman and Diann Moore.

== Historic events ==
- Many performers and events have been hosted in Wharton Field House in its existence. Some of note are:

Entertainers: Gene Autry, Chuck Berry (1972), Jack Benny, Blue Öyster Cult (1972), Victor Borge, The Byrds (1969), Johnny Cash, Patsy Cline, Bill Haley and the Comets, The Kingston Trio, Martin and Lewis, and the Tommy Dorsey Orchestra.

- Political Events: 1948, Swedish Prince Bertil. 1964, Barry Goldwater. 1968, George Wallace. 2014, Michelle Obama.
- 1959 Miss Illinois Pageant.
- Fighting: World Wrestling Federation (WWF), American Wrestling Association (AWA), and other professional wrestling events were held regularly from the late 1940s to the early 1990s. 1950, Wrestler Gorgeous George. Boxers: 1931, Max Schmeling and Jack Dempsey. 1950, Joe Louis. 1991, Hulk Hogan and Ric Flair
