= Murray Wier =

American basketball player (1926–2016)

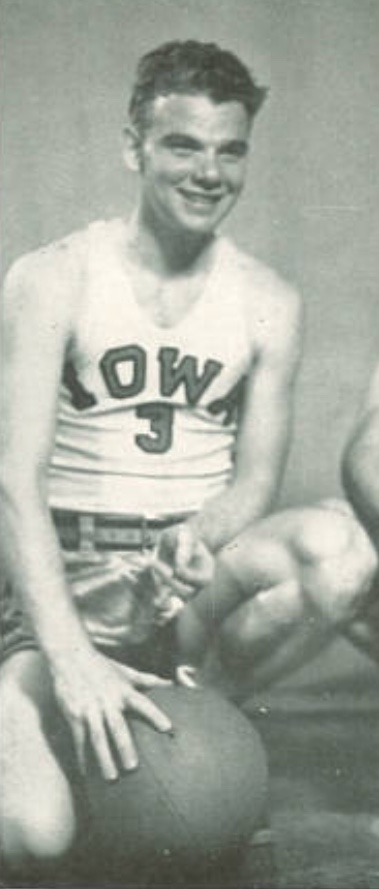
- Wier from the 1947 Hawkeye

Personal information
- Born: December 12, 1926 Grandview, Iowa, U.S.
- Died: April 6, 2016 (aged 89) Georgetown, Texas, U.S.
- Listed height: 5 ft 9 in (1.75 m)
- Listed weight: 155 lb (70 kg)

Career information
- High school: Muscatine (Muscatine, Iowa)
- College: Iowa (1945–1948)
- BAA draft: 1948: — round, —
- Drafted by: Fort Wayne Pistons
- Playing career: 1948–1951
- Position: Guard
- Number: 17

Career history
- 1948–1950: Tri-Cities Blackhawks
- 1950–1951: Waterloo Hawks

Career highlights
- Consensus first-team All-American (1948); NCAA scoring champion (1948); First-team All-Big Ten (1948)

Career NBA statistics
- Points: 429 (7.7 ppg)
- Assists: 107 (1.9 apg)
- Games played: 56
- Stats at NBA.com
- Stats at Basketball Reference

Murray Neal Wier (December 12, 1926 – April 6, 2016), nicknamed "Rampaging Redhead" and "Wizard Wier," was an American professional basketball player for the Tri-Cities Blackhawks (now the present-day Atlanta Hawks) and the Waterloo Hawks. He is better known for his standout college career at the University of Iowa, however, when in 1947–48 he was named a consensus first team All-American and was also the inaugural National Collegiate Athletic Association (NCAA) Major College scoring leader at 21.0 points per game.

== Early life ==
Wier was born in Grandview, Iowa. He attended Grandview High School from his freshman through junior years before moving to Muscatine, Iowa. He then spent his senior year in 1943–44 at Muscatine High School, from which he graduated. He led Muscatine High School to a district championship with a 50–37 win over their archrival, Davenport High School, and was named a first team all-state selection by the Des Moines Register and Iowa Daily Press Association. After his breakout senior season, University of Iowa head men's basketball coach Pops Harrison offered him a full scholarship to play for the Hawkeyes.

== Career ==
=== College ===
Harrison made Wier a four-year starter at Iowa. In his freshman season of 1944–45, the Hawkeyes won the Big Ten Conference season championship. Wier was a 5 ft 9 in (1.75 m), 155 lb (70 kg) guard but played more of a hybrid position, utilizing his dribbling and shooting guard abilities while technically lining up as a forward. The Hawkeyes were fairly successful over the rest of Wier's career and eventually finished second to the Michigan Wolverines for the conference championship during his senior season in 1947–48.

Wier led the Hawkeyes in scoring in both his junior and senior years at 15.1 and 21.0 points per game (ppg), respectively. Like he did in high school, he had a breakout senior year. His 21.0 ppg led the NCAA in scoring en route to Wier becoming the first officially recognized Major College division scoring leader. In the process, he set a then-Big Ten record of 272 points in conference play, was a first team all-conference selection and was also dubbed the Big Ten's Most Valuable Player. He capped his career off by being named a consensus first team All-American.

=== Professional ===
Wier was drafted 48th overall in the 1948 Basketball Association of America Draft by the Fort Wayne Pistons. Although he was drafted by the Pistons, he did not play for them. He began his career in 1948 with the Tri-Cities Blackhawks, who originally played in the National Basketball League (NBL). Before the 1949–50 season, the BAA and NBL merged to form the present-day NBA. In 1949–50, Wier's second season with the Blackhawks, he played for Red Auerbach, who would later win 10 NBA titles as a head coach. After three years with the Blackhawks, Wier then spent one final season playing professional basketball when he joined the Waterloo Hawks of the National Professional Basketball League. When the league folded, his basketball career as a player ended.

== Later life ==
After professional basketball, Wier became an assistant coach at Waterloo East High School for the boys' basketball team. He was the head coach for 24 years and compiled an overall record of 374 wins versus 140 losses, including winning the state championship in 1974. That same season he was named the Iowa State Coach of the Year. Weir was also the head men's tennis coach for 10 years before retiring in 1989. Aside from coaching, Wier also served as the high school's athletic director for 34 years.

Wier lived in Georgetown, Texas in a retirement community called Sun City Texas. He was a member of the NBA Retired Players Association. Wier died on April 6, 2016.

== Career statistics ==
Legend
GP	Games played	GS	Games started	MPG	Minutes per game
FG%	Field goal percentage	3P%	3-point field goal percentage	FT%	Free throw percentage
RPG	Rebounds per game	APG	Assists per game	SPG	Steals per game
BPG	Blocks per game	PPG	Points per game	**Bold**	Career high

=== NBA ===
==== Regular season ====
Year	Team	GP	FG%	FT%	APG	PPG
1949–50	Tri-Cities	56	.327	.693	1.9	7.7

==== Playoffs ====
Year	Team	GP	FG%	FT%	APG	PPG
1949–50	Tri-Cities	3	.333	.500	.0	3.3

== See also ==
- List of shortest players in National Basketball Association history
