= Mac Otten =

American basketball player

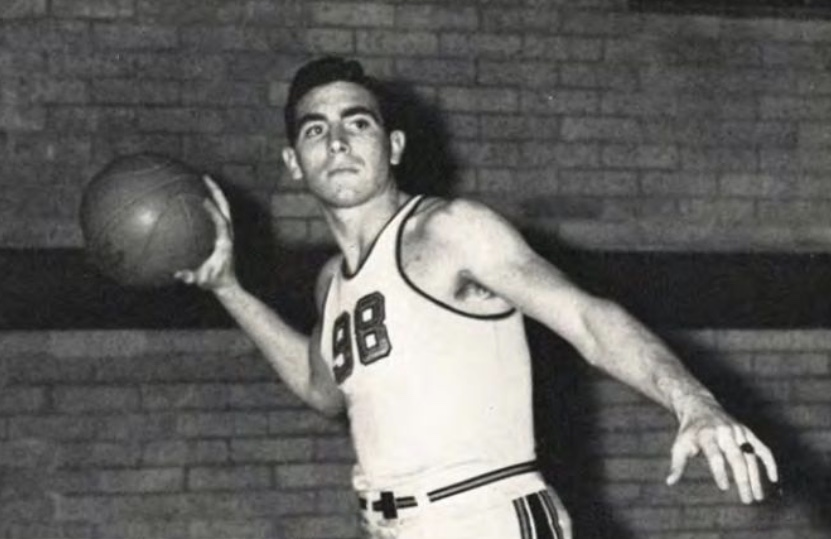
- Otten during his senior season at Bowling Green

Personal information
- Born: December 16, 1925 Bellefontaine, Ohio, U.S.
- Died: December 26, 2015 (aged 90) Centerville, Ohio, U.S.
- Listed height: 6 ft 7 in (2.01 m)
- Listed weight: 220 lb (100 kg)

Career information
- High school: Bellefontaine (Bellefontaine, Ohio)
- College: Bowling Green (1945–1949)
- NBA draft: 1949: 3rd round, –
- Drafted by: Indianapolis Jets
- Playing career: 1949–1950
- Position: Power forward / center
- Number: 20, 14

Career history
- 1949: Tri-Cities Blackhawks
- 1949–1950: St. Louis Bombers

Career NBA statistics
- Points: 142 (2.4 ppg)
- Assists: 36 (0.6 apg)
- Stats at NBA.com
- Stats at Basketball Reference

Mac William Otten (December 16, 1925 – December 26, 2015) was an American professional basketball player. Otten was selected in the third round in the 1949 BAA Draft by the Indianapolis Jets. He played for the Tri-Cities Blackhawks in 1949–50 before being traded to the St. Louis Bombers that season. He ended his BAA/NBA career playing for the Bombers.

Mac Otten is also the brother of Don Otten, another former NBA player. He and Don also became the first pair of brothers to play together for a single team in the NBA with the Blackhawks.

== Career statistics ==
Legend
| GP | Games played | GS | Games started | MPG | Minutes per game |
| FG% | Field goal percentage | 3P% | 3-point field goal percentage | FT% | Free throw percentage |
| RPG | Rebounds per game | APG | Assists per game | SPG | Steals per game |
| BPG | Blocks per game | PPG | Points per game | **Bold** | Career high |

=== NBA ===
==== Regular season ====
| Year | Team | GP | FG% | FT% | APG | PPG |
|---|---|---|---|---|---|---|
| 1949–50 | Tri-Cities | 12 | **.353** | **.682** | **.9** | **3.3** |
| 1949–50 | St. Louis | **47** | .322 | .424 | .5 | 2.2 |
| Career | | 59 | .329 | .494 | .6 | 2.4 |
