= 1952 NBA All-Star Game =

Exhibition basketball game

	1	2	3	4	Total
East	26	23	33	26	108
West	22	22	27	20	91
- Date: Monday, February 11, 1952
- Arena: Boston Garden
- City: Boston
- MVP: Paul Arizin
- Attendance: 10,221
- Network: WPIX
- Announcers: Bud Palmer and Jimmy Powers

NBA All-Star Game
< 1951	1953 >

The 2nd Annual NBA All-Star Game was an exhibition basketball game played on February 11, 1952, at Boston Garden in Boston, home of the Boston Celtics. The game was the second edition of the National Basketball Association (NBA) All-Star Game and was played during the 1951–52 NBA season. The Eastern All-Stars team defeated the Western All-Stars team 108–91. This was the East's second successive win over the West. Philadelphia Warriors' Paul Arizin, who led the East with 26 points, was named as the All-Star Game Most Valuable Player.

== Roster ==
The players for the All-Star Game were chosen by sports writers in several cities. They were not allowed to select players from their own cities. Players were selected without regard to position. Ten players from each Division were selected to represent the Eastern and Western Division in the All-Star Game. However, Dolph Schayes and Larry Foust suffered injuries and were unable to participate in the game; two other players were added to the roster. Nine players from the previous year's Eastern All-Stars roster returned for their second straight selection. Only seven players from the previous year's Western All-Stars roster returned. Six players, Leo Barnhorst, Arnie Risen, Fred Scolari, Paul Walther, Bobby Wanzer and Max Zaslofsky, were selected for the first time. Four teams, the Minneapolis Lakers, the New York Knickerbockers, the Philadelphia Warriors and the Rochester Royals, were represented by three players each on the roster. The starters were chosen by each team's head coach.

John Kundla, head coach of the defending Western Division champions Minneapolis Lakers, was named as the Western All-Stars head coach for the second straight year. Although the Rochester Royals overtook Minneapolis twice for the division lead in February prior to the game, their surge came too late to affect Kundla's selection, which was secured by the Lakers leading the division entering the month. Al Cervi, player-coach of the Eastern Division leader Syracuse Nationals, was named as the Eastern All-Stars head coach.

Eastern All-Stars
Pos.	Player	Team	No. of selections
Starters
F/G	Paul Arizin	Philadelphia Warriors	2nd
G	Bob Cousy	Boston Celtics	2nd
F/C	Harry Gallatin	New York Knickerbockers	2nd
C/F	Ed Macauley	Boston Celtics	2nd
G/F	Andy Phillip	Philadelphia Warriors	2nd
Reserves
F/C	Joe Fulks	Philadelphia Warriors	2nd
G	Dick McGuire	New York Knickerbockers	2nd
C/F	Red Rocha	Syracuse Nationals	2nd
F/C	Dolph Schayes	Syracuse Nationals	2nd
G	Fred Scolari	Baltimore Bullets	1st
G/F	Max Zaslofsky	New York Knickerbockers	1st
Head coach: Al Cervi (Syracuse Nationals)

Western All-Stars
Pos.	Player	Team	No. of selections
Starters
C	George Mikan	Minneapolis Lakers	2nd
F/C	Vern Mikkelsen	Minneapolis Lakers	2nd
F/C	Jim Pollard	Minneapolis Lakers	2nd
G/F	Paul Walther	Indianapolis Olympians	1st
G	Bobby Wanzer	Rochester Royals	1st
Reserves
F/G	Leo Barnhorst	Indianapolis Olympians	1st
G	Frank Brian	Fort Wayne Pistons	2nd
G/F	Bob Davies	Rochester Royals	2nd
F/G	Dwight Eddleman	Milwaukee Hawks	2nd
C/F	Larry Foust	Fort Wayne Pistons	2nd
C/F	Arnie Risen	Rochester Royals	1st
Head coach:John Kundla (Minneapolis Lakers)

== Game ==
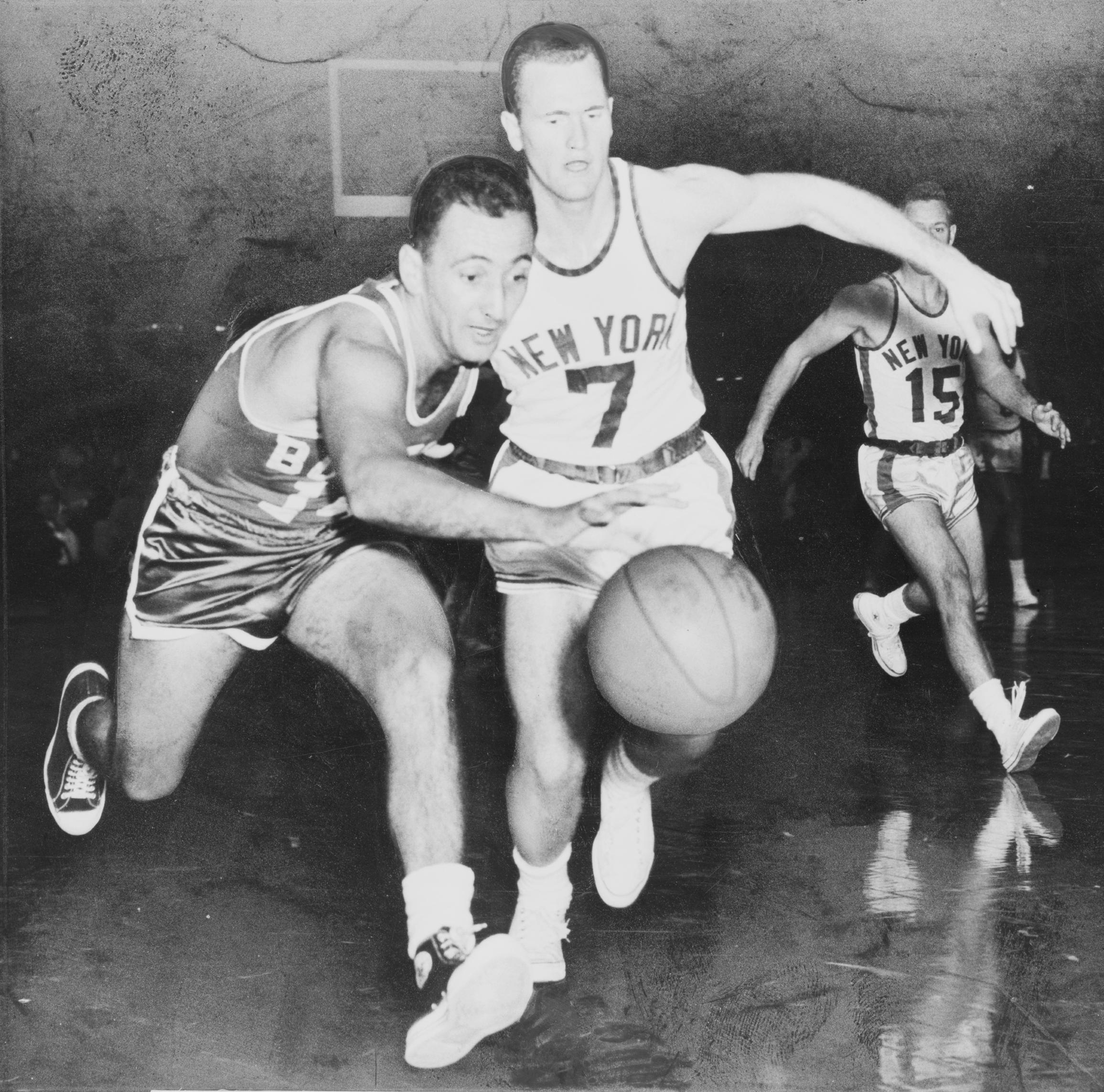
Bob Cousy (left) recorded a game-high 13 assists for the East.

The East defeated the West for the second successive year. The West trailed by four and five points at the end of the first and second quarter respectively. Then the East outscored the West by six points in the third and fourth quarter to win the game by 17 points. Philadelphia Warriors' Paul Arizin and Minneapolis Lakers' George Mikan both scored a game-high 26 points. Mikan also added a game-high 15 rebounds but his team only had a 35.9 field goal percentage. On the other hand, six Eastern players scored in double figures as their team made 49.4 percent of its shots. Boston Celtics guard Bob Cousy also recorded a game-high 13 assists for the East. Arizin was named as the All-Star Game Most Valuable Player. However, he was honored a year later during the 1953 All-Star Game, when the league decided to designate an MVP for each year's game.

=== Box score ===
February 11, 1952

Eastern All-Stars 108, Western All-Stars 91
Scoring by quarter: 26–22, 23–22, 33–27, 26–20
Pts: Paul Arizin 26; Rebs: Harry Gallatin 9 Asts: Bob Cousy 13	Pts: George Mikan 26; Rebs: George Mikan 15; Asts: Davies, Pollard, Risen 5 each

Boston Garden, Boston, Massachusetts
Attendance: 10,221
Referees:
- Sid Borgia
- Stan Stutz

Legend
Pos	Position	Min	Minutes played	FGM	Field goals made	FGA	Field goal attempted	FTM	Free throws made
FTA	Free throw attempted	Reb	Rebounds	Ast	Assists	PF	Personal fouls	Pts	Points

Eastern All-Stars
Player	Pos	Min	FGM	FGA	FTM	FTA	Reb	Ast	PF	Pts
Starters
Bob Cousy	G	33	4	14	1	2	4	13	3	9
Andy Phillip	G/F	30	4	6	3	3	3	6	1	11
Paul Arizin	F/G	32	9	13	8	8	6	0	1	26
Harry Gallatin	F/C	22	3	5	1	4	9	3	3	7
Ed Macauley	C/F	28	3	7	9	9	7	3	2	15
Bench
Red Rocha	C/F	28	5	11	2	2	5	2	4	12
Max Zaslofsky	G/F	25	3	7	5	5	4	2	0	11
Dick McGuire	G	18	0	0	1	3	1	4	0	1
Fred Scolari	G	15	5	9	0	0	0	2	0	10
Joe Fulks	F/C	9	3	7	0	1	5	2	6	
Dolph Schayes	F/C	Did not play due to injury								
Team totals		240	39	79	30	37	44	37	16	108

Western All-Stars
Player	Pos	Min	FGM	FGA	FTM	FTA	Reb	Ast	PF	Pts
Starters
Bobby Wanzer	G	22	1	8	2	2	5	5	2	4
Paul Walther	G/F	17	1	4	0	0	2	2	1	2
Vern Mikkelsen	F/C	23	5	8	2	2	10	0	2	12
Jim Pollard	F/C	29	2	17	0	0	11	5	3	4
George Mikan	C	29	9	19	8	9	15	1	5	26
Bench
Bob Davies	G/F	27	4	11	0	0	0	5	4	8
Dwight Eddleman	F/G	26	1	3	0	0	2	2	2	2
Frank Brian	G	25	4	10	5	6	7	4	2	13
Leo Barnhorst	F/G	23	7	16	0	1	2	2	4	14
Arnie Risen	C/F	19	3	7	0	1	5	1	3	6
Larry Foust	C/F	Did not play due to injury								
Team totals		240	37	103	17	21	59	27	28	91
