= Jack Nichols (basketball) =

American basketball player

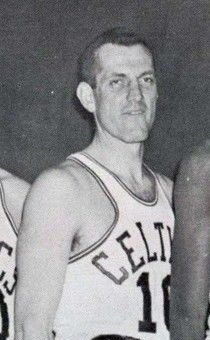

Personal information
- Born: April 9, 1926 Wenatchee, Washington, U.S.
- Died: December 24, 1992 (aged 66) Palm Springs, California, U.S.
- Listed height: 6 ft 7 in (2.01 m)
- Listed weight: 222 lb (101 kg)

Career information
- High school: Everett (Everett, Washington)
- College: Washington (1943–1944); USC (1944–1946); Washington (1946–1948)
- BAA draft: 1948: 1st round, 12th overall pick
- Drafted by: Washington Capitols
- Playing career: 1948–1958
- Position: Power forward / center
- Number: 15, 5, 16

Career history
- 1948–1950: Washington Capitols
- 1950–1954: Tri-Cities Blackhawks / Milwaukee Hawks
- 1954–1958: Boston Celtics

Career highlights
- NBA champion (1957); Consensus second-team All-American (1948); 5× First-team All-PCC (1944–1948)

Career BAA and NBA statistics
- Points: 5,245 (10.4 ppg)
- Rebounds: 2,782 (6.9 rpg)
- Assists: 964 (1.9 apg)
- Stats at NBA.com
- Stats at Basketball Reference

Jack Edward Nichols (April 9, 1926 – December 24, 1992) was an American professional basketball player.

A 6'7" power forward who played college basketball for the Washington Huskies and USC Trojans, Nichols played nine seasons (1948–1951;1952–1958) in the National Basketball Association (NBA) as a member of the Washington Capitols, Tri-Cities Blackhawks, Milwaukee Hawks, and Boston Celtics. He scored 5,245 points in his career and was a contributor to the Celtics' 1957 NBA championship team, who was coached by his former Washington Capitol coach, Red Auerbach. During his last 3 years with the Celtics, he attended Tufts Dental School full-time, earning his doctor of dentistry in 1958.

During his collegiate career, Nichols was named an all-conference player in five different seasons, twice with USC, and three times at UW (only player ever to achieve this). In 1948 he set the single game (39 points vs. Idaho) and single season scoring records for the Pacific Coast Conference. He was named a Helms Foundation All-American, and led the Huskies to the 1948 NCAA tournament by Beating Cal in a 3-game series.

Upon his retirement from professional basketball, Nichols served as the team dentist for the University of Washington and for the Seattle SuperSonics. Nichols has been inducted into the University of Washington Hall of Fame, the State of Washington Sports Hall of Fame, and the Pac-12 Conference Hall of Honor.

== BAA/NBA career statistics ==
Legend
GP	Games played	GS	Games started	MPG	Minutes per game
FG%	Field goal percentage	3P%	3-point field goal percentage	FT%	Free throw percentage
RPG	Rebounds per game	APG	Assists per game	SPG	Steals per game
BPG	Blocks per game	PPG	Points per game	**Bold**	Career high
†	Won an NBA championship

=== Regular season ===
Year	Team	GP	MPG	FG%	FT%	RPG	APG	PPG
1948–49	Washington	34	–	.390	.730	–	1.6	11.7
1949–50	Washington	49	–	.362	.736	–	1.7	13.1
1949–50	Tri-Cities	18	–	.374	**.800**	–	**3.4**	13.1
1950–51	Tri-Cities	6	–	.342	.762	**10.5**	2.5	11.7
1952–53	Milwaukee	69	**38.1**	.363	.708	7.7	2.8	**15.8**
1953–54	Milwaukee / Boston	**75**	21.4	.309	.743	4.8	1.4	5.9
1954–55	Boston	64	29.8	.380	.780	8.3	2.3	9.9
1955–56	Boston	60	32.7	**.413**	.791	10.4	2.7	14.3
1956–57†	Boston	61	22.5	.363	.794	6.1	1.4	8.2
1957–58	Boston	69	17.7	.351	.738	4.4	.9	5.8
Career		505	26.9	.368	.752	6.9	1.9	10.4

=== Playoffs ===
Year	Team	GP	MPG	FG%	FT%	RPG	APG	PPG
1949	Washington	**11**	–	.408	.667	–	2.5	14.4
1950	Tri-Cities	3	–	.300	.742	–	3.7	**19.7**
1954	Boston	6	**35.2**	**.486**	.789	10.3	**5.2**	16.7
1955	Boston	7	33.0	.370	.813	7.0	3.3	10.4
1956	Boston	3	33.3	.372	**.900**	**12.0**	3.3	13.7
1957†	Boston	10	11.7	.400	.600	1.7	.7	3.5
1958	Boston	**11**	13.5	.348	.700	4.1	.7	4.8
Career		51	21.8	.389	.739	5.6	2.3	10.2
