= 1950–51 Tri-Cities Blackhawks season =

NBA professional basketball team season

- Head coach: Dave MacMillan; Johnny Logan; Mike Todorovich
- Arena: Wharton Field House

Results
- Record: 25–43 (.368)
- Place: Division: 5th (Western)
- Playoff finish: Did not qualify
- Stats at Basketball Reference

The 1950–51 Tri-Cities Blackhawks season was the Tri-Cities Blackhawks' fifth season of play, their second season in the NBA, and their last season played in Moline, IL while representing the Tri-Cities naming convention that also supported Rock Island, IL and Davenport, IA during that period of time. It also signaled the last season under the Blackhawks name, as they would go on to shorten it to just the Hawks following their move to Milwaukee, Wisconsin in the following season.

== Regular season ==
=== Season standings ===
Western Division	W	L	PCT	GB	Home	Road	Neutral	Div
x-Minneapolis Lakers	44	24	.647	–	29–3	12–21	3–0	24–12
x-Rochester Royals	41	27	.603	3	29–5	12–22	–	18–15
x-Fort Wayne Pistons	32	36	.471	12	27–7	5–27	0–2	18–6
x-Indianapolis Olympians	31	37	.456	13	19–12	10–24	2–1	15–20
Tri-Cities Blackhawks	25	43	.368	19	22–13	2–28	1–2	12–24

x – clinched playoff spot

=== Game log ===
1950–51 Game log
#	Date	Opponent	Score	High points	Record
1	November 2	Boston	65–79	Frank Brian (19)	1–0
2	November 4	New York	76–87	Jack Nichols (19)	2–0
3	November 5	New York	95–98 (OT)	Dwight Eddleman (18)	3–0
4	November 8	at Fort Wayne	79–87	Frank Brian (14)	3–1
5	November 9	at Syracuse	70–89	Jack Nichols (24)	3–2
6	November 11	Rochester	77–86	Frank Brian (16)	3–3
7	November 12	Rochester	79–82 (OT)	Noble Jorgensen (22)	4–3
8	November 16	Syracuse	75–79	Noble Jorgensen (16)	5–3
9	November 18	Indianapolis	67–74	Brian, Jorgensen (17)	5–4
10	November 19	Indianapolis	81–104	Noble Jorgensen (24)	6–4
11	November 21	N Baltimore	76–65	Frank Brian (20)	7–4
12	November 22	at Washington	60–65	Brian, Jorgensen (11)	7–5
13	November 23	at Boston	78–94	Frank Brian (21)	7–6
14	November 25	Fort Wayne	71–85	Noble Jorgensen (17)	8–6
15	November 28	Baltimore	73–65	Dwight Eddleman (15)	8–7
16	November 29	at Minneapolis	66–85	Frank Brian (17)	8–8
17	December 3	New York	100–92	Frank Brian (24)	8–9
18	December 7	Fort Wayne	77–76	Kleggie Hermsen (14)	8–10
19	December 9	Minneapolis	88–79	Frank Brian (26)	8–11
20	December 10	at Minneapolis	101–114	Frank Brian (32)	8–12
21	December 12	at Indianapolis	74–75	Dwight Eddleman (17)	8–13
22	December 13	at Baltimore	55–83	Johnny Logan (14)	8–14
23	December 14	at Syracuse	78–69	Frank Brian (18)	9–14
24	December 16	Minneapolis	86–71	Dwight Eddleman (17)	9–15
25	December 17	at Fort Wayne	103–99	Dwight Eddleman (48)	10–15
26	December 20	Syracuse	83–86	Dwight Eddleman (22)	11–15
27	December 25	Baltimore	72–87	Cal Christensen (22)	12–15
28	December 28	Washington	80–97	Dwight Eddleman (24)	13–15
29	December 29	at Indianapolis	81–112	Dwight Eddleman (32)	13–16
30	December 31	Fort Wayne	100–110	Frank Brian (29)	14–16
31	January 1	Philadelphia	92–109	Frank Brian (34)	15–16
32	January 3	Boston	84–82	Dwight Eddleman (26)	15–17
33	January 7	Indianapolis	79–83	Kleggie Hermsen (18)	16–17
34	January 10	Syracuse	97–96	Frank Brian (30)	16–18
35	January 11	Minneapolis	113–109	Frank Brian (41)	16–19
36	January 14	at Fort Wayne	85–94	Brian, Carpenter (16)	16–20
37	January 16	at Rochester	89–97	Frank Brian (21)	16–21
38	January 17	at Baltimore	70–81	Dwight Eddleman (20)	16–22
39	January 18	at Boston	85–105	Frank Brian (29)	16–23
40	January 20	Boston	85–91	Dwight Eddleman (21)	17–23
41	January 21	at Minneapolis	82–89	Kleggie Hermsen (16)	17–24
42	January 23	at Philadelphia	77–88	Eddleman, Todorovich (16)	17–25
43	January 24	at New York	85–95	Dwight Eddleman (24)	17–26
44	January 25	at Syracuse	87–113	Frank Brian (20)	17–27
45	January 28	Philadelphia	96–86	Mike Todorovich (23)	17–28
46	January 29	N Indianapolis	85–87	Dwight Eddleman (23)	17–29
47	January 31	at Minneapolis	78–106	Frank Brian (21)	17–30
48	February 1	Fort Wayne	102–109	Frank Brian (30)	18–30
49	February 4	Rochester	81–84	Frank Brian (26)	19–30
50	February 6	at Philadelphia	77–97	Dwight Eddleman (16)	19–31
51	February 8	at Boston	70–85	Frank Brian (15)	19–32
52	February 10	at Rochester	90–98	Harry Boykoff (22)	19–33
53	February 11	Philadelphia	72–76	Mike Todorovich (24)	20–33
54	February 14	Indianapolis	91–98	Dwight Eddleman (25)	21–33
55	February 18	Rochester	83–89	Dwight Eddleman (26)	22–33
56	February 20	at Philadelphia	69–99	Dwight Eddleman (23)	22–34
57	February 22	at New York	90–94	Dwight Eddleman (25)	22–35
58	February 24	at Rochester	89–99	Dwight Eddleman (21)	22–36
59	February 25	Rochester	82–78	Frank Brian (16)	22–37
60	February 27	N Minneapolis	77–83	Frank Brian (23)	22–38
61	February 28	Baltimore	85–100	Dwight Eddleman (30)	23–38
62	March 4	Indianapolis	72–87	Dwight Eddleman (28)	24–38
63	March 6	Fort Wayne	86–88	Frank Brian (23)	25–38
64	March 10	Minneapolis	99–88	Frank Brian (23)	25–39
65	March 11	at Fort Wayne	87–102	Brian, Todorovich (17)	25–40
66	March 14	New York	92–91	Bob Carpenter (22)	25–41
67	March 17	Minneapolis	92–91 (OT)	Mike Todorovich (21)	25–42
68	March 18	at Fort Wayne	82–95	Brian, Eddleman (15)	25–43

== Player statistics ==
Legend
GP	Games played	GS	Games started	MPG	Minutes per game
FG%	Field-goal percentage	3P%	3-point field-goal percentage	FT%	Free-throw percentage
RPG	Rebounds per game	APG	Assists per game	SPG	Steals per game
BPG	Blocks per game	PPG	Points per game

== Awards and records ==
- Frank Brian, All-NBA Second Team

== See also ==
- 1950-51 NBA season
