= Dwight Eddleman =

American athlete (1922–2001)

Personal information
- Born: December 27, 1922 Centralia, Illinois, U.S.
- Died: August 1, 2001 (aged 78) Urbana, Illinois, U.S.
- Listed height: 6 ft 3 in (1.91 m)
- Listed weight: 189 lb (86 kg)

Career information
- High school: Centralia (Centralia, Illinois)
- College: Illinois (1945–1949)
- NBA draft: 1949: 3rd round, 24th overall pick
- Drafted by: Chicago Stags
- Playing career: 1949–1953
- Position: Small forward
- Number: 11, 18, 12

Career history
- 1949–1952: Tri-Cities Blackhawks / Milwaukee Hawks
- 1952–1953: Fort Wayne Pistons

Career highlights
- 2× NBA All-Star (1951, 1952); Second-team All-American – AP, UPI (1949)

Career statistics
- Points: 3,221 (12.1 ppg)
- Rebounds: 913 (4.5 rpg)
- Assists: 550 (2.1 apg)
- Stats at NBA.com
- Stats at Basketball Reference

Dwight Eddleman
No. 40
- Positions: Wide receiver, Punter, Punt returner

Career information
- NFL draft: 1947: 9th round, 75th overall pick

Awards and highlights
- University of Illinois records; Punt return average in a single game; 10/8/1947 (51.0 yards); Punt return average in a season; 1947 (32.8 yards); Longest punt; 11/6/1948 (88 yards); Longest punt return; 11/8/1947 (92 yards); Career punt return average; 1946–48 (21.5 yards); Season punt return average; 1948 (32.8 yards); Single game punt return average; 10/18/1947 (51.0 yards)

Dwight Eddleman
Sport
- Sport: Track & field
- Event: High jump

Achievements and titles
- Highest world ranking: 3 (1948)
- Personal best: HJ: 2.04 m (1948)
Medal record
Representing the United States
Olympic Games
1948 London

Thomas Dwight "Dike" Eddleman (December 27, 1922 – August 1, 2001) was an American athlete who was generally considered the greatest athlete in the history of athletics at the University of Illinois. Eddleman participated on the university's basketball, track and field, and football teams between the years of 1942 and 1949. Eddleman earned a combined 11 varsity letters in his career at the university, during which he also became a member of the Sigma Chi fraternity. Eddleman was born in Centralia, Illinois, and attended Centralia High School. On October 24, 2008, Eddleman was named a Distinguished Alumni of Centralia High school. He, along with five others, including James Brady, were the first to be named Distinguished Alumni. His wife, Teddy Eddleman, accepted his award.

Beginning in 1969, Eddleman served the University of Illinois as a fundraiser for the athletic department. In tribute to his years of service to the university's athletics, in 1993, the University of Illinois athlete of the year awards for both men and women were named in his honor. In 2002, the portion of Fourth Street in Champaign, Illinois that runs along the east side of Memorial Stadium between Peabody Drive and Kirby Street was designated Honorary Dike Eddleman Way (a street in his hometown of Centralia, Third Street, which runs past the old high school, is also designated Dike Eddleman Way).

In 1983, Eddleman was inducted into the National Federation of State High School Associations Hall of Fame.

== Sports accomplishments ==
=== High school ===
As a high school player, Eddleman is considered one of the finest players in the history of high school basketball in the state of Illinois. Eddleman played four years at Centralia High School, from 1939 to 1942. Eddleman led the Centralia Orphans to the 1942 Illinois state basketball championship, after finishing fourth in 1939 and third in 1941. In the 1942 title game, Eddleman single-handedly led a comeback as the Orphans were 13 points down with five minutes to go. As a junior and senior, Eddleman led the state in scoring with 969 and 834 points, respectively. His 969 points as a junior broke the previous state record of 751 points. During his high school career, Eddleman scored 2702 career points, which was at the time of his graduation from high school a state record for most points in a career. Eddleman was the first high school player in Illinois to average at least 20 points per game. In 2007, the Illinois High School Association named Eddleman one of the 100 Legends of the IHSA Boys Basketball Tournament.

=== University of Illinois ===
==== Basketball ====
In the fall of 1942, Eddleman enrolled at the University of Illinois, playing on both the freshman football and basketball teams. However, in January 1943 Eddleman was called to military duty during World War II. He was placed in the Army Air Corps and, after being sent to Fort Sheridan in Chicago for basic training, he was stationed in Miami Beach where he was assigned as a physical trainer for new cadets, all while still being only 20 years of age. It was in Florida that he would suffer the most serious injury of his time in the military as during a beach volleyball game, Eddleman broke his right foot. Following approximately eighteen months in Florida, Eddleman returned to his home state near Belleville, Illinois stationed at Scott Field. His final destination during his military service was Wright Field in Dayton, Ohio, where he played basketball for the Kittyhawks, a military service "all-star" team regarded as one of the greatest in the nation. While playing for the Kittyhawks, he was named to the College All-Star team composed of the best college players in the country. The team played games around the country, but one particularly memorable game was when the Kittyhawks beat the Harlem Globetrotters in 1945. Eddleman would close out his military service in the fall of 1946, transitioning back to the life of a college student athlete.

Upon returning to the University of Illinois, as a second semester freshman in the spring of 1947, Eddleman was immediately issued his Fighting Illini football and basketball uniforms and then flown to Berkeley, California to play in two basketball games prior to the semester commencing. The Fighting Illini played consecutive games against the University of California Berkeley on December 20 and 21. Eddleman followed that trip with another flight, this time to Pasadena to play on January 1 in the 1947 Rose Bowl game. He and his Illinois football teammates beat the UCLA Bruins by a score of 45–14, meanwhile back in Madison, Eddleman's basketball teammates would lose on the same day to the Wisconsin Badgers, the team that would go on to win the Big Ten title. Eddleman returned by train to Champaign, where he joined the reunited remaining group of "The Whiz Kids", Ken Menke, Gene Vance, and Andy Phillip as well as All-American guard Walt Kirk on the basketball team to play in a January 4 game against the University of Mexico in which the Illini would win by a score of 94–36. Eddleman was back for the remainder of a season where he would spend most of it as a backup to "The Whiz Kids". The Illini would finish with an overall record of 14–6 and a Big Ten record of 8–4, second place in the conference.

In his second season of varsity basketball, Eddleman would lead the team in scoring and be named to the Associated Press 2nd team All-American, Converse 3rd team All-American, as well as True Magazine 3rd team All-American. The team would be led by new head coach, Harry Combes to an overall record of 15 wins and 5 losses and a 7 and 5 conference record, third place in the Big Ten. After the season, Eddleman would be named First-team All-Big Ten as well as the University of Illinois Athlete of the Year.

In the 1948–49 season, Eddleman would lead the basketball team to the Big Ten title, and an appearance in the NCAA Final Four. That year, he earned the Chicago Tribune's Silver Basketball as the conference MVP. He was named a Converse 1st team All-American, Big Ten Player of the Year and earned the Big Ten Medal of Honor. Eddleman served as the team captain in 1949 and was named the team MVP that year and the University of Illinois Athlete of the Year for the second straight season. In his military shortened tenure at Illinois, Eddleman scored 618 points in 55 games for an average of 11.2 points per game, but 606 of those points were scored in his final two seasons for an average of 13.5 points per game. The Fighting Illini's record over Eddleman's three season was 50 wins and 15 losses overall and 25 wins and 11 losses in the conference.

==== Football ====
Eddleman was a member of three football teams while attending Illinois, however, the 1946 team would be the most successful. Not only would they win the 1947 Rose Bowl game, they were also the Big Ten champions finishing with 8 wins and 2 losses overall while going 6 and 1 in conference play. The 1947 team was not as successful, finishing in fourth place in the conference with a 3 and 3 record, while winning 5 games, losing 3 games and tying 1 overall. Eddleman's final season was in 1948. This team would finish in eighth place in the conference with a record of 2 and 5 and an overall record 3 wins and 6 losses. Individually, Eddleman would set several records for punting and punt returning, seven of which still stand at Illinois.

Eddleman was drafted in the ninth round by the Chicago Bears with the 75th pick in the 1947 NFL draft. He was additionally drafted by the Cleveland Browns with the 145th pick in the 1948 AAFC Draft.

==== Track & field ====
As a high school athlete, Eddleman won three Illinois state high jump titles. As a collegian, each year that Eddleman attended Illinois he also competed in track as a high jumper. Eddleman would win various high jump titles while at Illinois, including the Chicago Relays, the Illinois Tech Relays, and the Penn Relays. Additionally, he won three high jump titles in each appearance at the Big Ten Indoor Championships, the Central Collegiate Championships, and the Drake Relays. He also won an NCAA Championship in 1948 as well as Big Ten outdoor high jump titles in 1947 and 1949, the Kansas Relays, the Compton Relays, the Purdue Relays, and the Kansas City Games. During his four years of competition, his Fighting Illini team would win an NCAA championship in 1947.

On July 10, 1948, the summer of his junior year, Eddleman became eligible to participate in the 1948 Summer Olympics by qualifying at a meet held in Dyche Stadium at Northwestern University. After qualifying, Eddleman traveled to London in good company with Illini teammate Bob Richards as well as other Olympic notables including Harrison Dillard, Herb McKenley, Clyde "Smackover" Scott, and Bill Porter. After qualifying in their respective events, the two Illinois athletes made a quick trip back to Champaign-Urbana on the train, leaving the next day to join the other American Olympic hopefuls in New York in order to board the SS America with a final destination of England.

The high jump took place on the first day of competition, July 30, 1948, and John Winter, a 23-year-old bank clerk from Perth, cleared a height of 6 ft 6 in (1.98 m) on his first attempt. The remaining four jumpers, including Eddleman, failed three times each to match Winter. For the first time in the Olympics, ties were decided according to fewer misses. The winning height was 6 feet 6 inches (1.98 m). The second-, third-, and fourth-place jumpers all cleared 6 ft 4.75 in (1.95 m). Eddleman was awarded fourth place due to his number of misses. After the Games, Eddleman competed in an additional track and field meet in Glasgow, Scotland, winning the high jump at a personal-best height of 6 ft 8.5 in (2.04 m). He then returned to the United States on the RMS Queen Elizabeth, arriving in Centralia by train to a citywide celebration. Less than a week later, he was practicing football in Memorial Stadium.

=== Professional basketball ===
After leaving the University of Illinois, Eddleman played professionally for four seasons in the National Basketball Association. His career began after he received offers from the Chicago Stags and the Tri-Cities Blackhawks. He decided to play for the Blackhawks because he preferred to live in Moline, Illinois, with his wife and newborn daughter. In 1950, Eddleman led the Blackhawks in scoring as a rookie. After playing for the Tri-City Blackhawks and the Milwaukee Hawks, he was traded to the Fort Wayne Zollner Pistons which resulted in a move to Indiana. While playing for the Pistons, he cultivated a friendship with Fred Schaus, who would later become coach of the Los Angeles Lakers. Eddleman played in the NBA All-Star Game in both 1951 and 1952. Over his NBA career, Eddleman scored 3221 points in 266 games, for a scoring average of 12.1 points per game.

During the off-season of the two years that he played in Indiana, Eddleman utilized his physical education degree by working as the recreational director for Central Soya, Incorporated, a Midwest soybean processing company. Prior to the 1954–55 season, after learning he would be traded to the Baltimore Bullets, a team that dropped out of the NBA and folded after playing 14 games in 1954, Eddleman decided to retire from professional basketball and work full-time for Central Soya. In 1956, Eddleman was transferred to a new plant in Gibson City, Illinois, a town located just 30 miles north of Champaign.

== Personal life and death ==
Eddleman married Teddy Georgia Townsley, his high school sweetheart, on December 25, 1945, as the couple exchanged wedding vows in a Christmas ceremony while Eddleman was home on leave from the Army Air Corps. Their marriage resulted in the birth of four children, three daughters and one son. Diana, Nancy, Kristy, and Tom, all of whom attended the University of Illinois.

In 1969 Eddleman left Central Soya and accepted the executive director of Grants-In-Aid position with the University of Illinois Foundation, a fundraising entity working with Fighting Illini Alumni to provide financial aid for student athletes. In 1990, the Grants-In-Aid program was renamed the Fighting Illini Scholarship Fund. Eddleman retired from his position with the University of Illinois on January 1, 1993.

In 1993, the University of Illinois renamed its male and female Athlete of the Year awards the Dike Eddleman Athlete of the Year.

Eddleman died from a heart ailment at Champaign's Carle Foundation Hospital, on August 1, 2001, at the age of 78.

== Honors ==
=== Basketball ===
- 1948 – First-team All-Big Ten
- 1949 – Team MVP and Captain
- 1949 – Converse 1st team All-American
- 1949 – Earned the Chicago Tribune's Silver Basketball award
- 1949 – Big Ten Player of the Year
- 1949 – Big Ten Medal of Honor recipient
- 1973 – Inducted into the Illinois Basketball Coaches Association's Hall of Fame as a player.
- 1983 – Inducted into the National High School Hall of Fame.
- 2005 – Elected to the "Illini Men's Basketball All-Century Team".
- 2007 – Named one of the 100 Legends of the IHSA Boys Basketball Tournament.
- 2008 – Honored jersey which hangs in the State Farm Center to show regard for being the most decorated basketball players in the University of Illinois' history.

=== Track & field ===
- 1948 – NCAA High Jump Champion
- 1948 – Member of the United States Olympic team
- 1959 – Member of the Drake Relays Hall of Fame

=== Football ===
- 1947 – Team leader in scoring (42pts)
- 1947 – Rose bowl champion

=== Athletics ===
- 1948 & 1949 – University of Illinois Athlete of the Year
- 1961 – Inducted into the Illinois Sports Hall of Fame
- 1993 – University of Illinois renamed their male and female Athlete of the Year awards to the Dike Eddleman Athlete of the Year.
- 2017 – Inducted into the University of Illinois Athletics Hall of Fame

== Statistics ==
=== College basketball ===
Season	Games	Points	PPG	Big Ten Record	Overall Record	Highlight
1946–47	10	12	1.2	8–4	14–6	-
1947–48	20	277	13.9	7–5	15–5	First-team All-Big Ten
1948–49	25	329	13.1	10–2	21–4	Big Ten Player of the Year
**Totals**	**55**	**618**	**11.2**	**25–11**	**50–15**	

=== NBA career statistics ===
Legend
GP	Games played	GS	Games started	MPG	Minutes per game
FG%	Field goal percentage	3P%	3-point field goal percentage	FT%	Free throw percentage
RPG	Rebounds per game	APG	Assists per game	SPG	Steals per game
BPG	Blocks per game	PPG	Points per game	**Bold**	Career high

==== Regular season ====
Year	Team	GP	MPG	FG%	FT%	RPG	APG	PPG
1949–50	Tri-Cities	64	–	.366	.623	–	2.2	12.9
1950–51	Tri-Cities	68	–	.355	**.699**	**6.0**	**2.5**	**15.3**
1951–52	Milwaukee	50	**32.3**	.324	.631	4.6	2.2	12.8
1951–52	Fort Wayne	16	18.0	**.381**	.462	2.3	1.4	6.5
1952–53	Fort Wayne	**69**	22.8	.351	.561	3.4	1.5	8.9
Career		267	25.7	.352	.630	4.5	2.1	12.1
All-Star		2	26.0	.250	.600	1.0	2.5	4.5

==== Playoffs ====
Year	Team	GP	MPG	FG%	FT%	RPG	APG	PPG
1950	Tri-Cities	3	–	.378	**.600**	–	**2.3**	**16.3**
1952	Fort Wayne	2	18.5	.375	.571	**3.5**	2.0	8.0
1953	Fort Wayne	**7**	9.0	**.391**	.267	0.7	0.3	3.1
Career		12	11.1	.381	.489	1.3	1.1	7.3
