= Don Ray (basketball) =

American basketball player

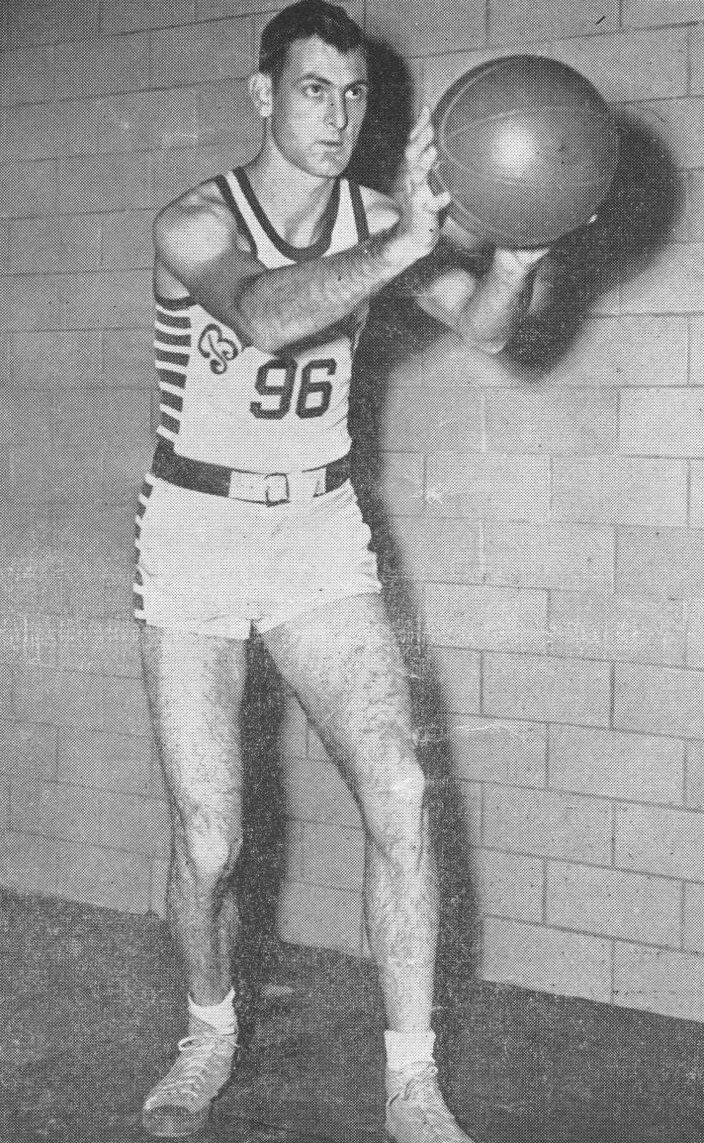

Personal information
- Born: July 8, 1921 Mount Juliet, Tennessee, U.S.
- Died: November 23, 1998 (aged 77) Bowling Green, Kentucky, U.S.
- Listed height: 6 ft 5 in (1.96 m)
- Listed weight: 190 lb (86 kg)

Career information
- College: Western Kentucky (1942–1943, 1946–1948)
- BAA draft: 1948: 1st round, 11th overall pick
- Drafted by: Philadelphia Warriors
- Position: Power forward / center
- Number: 96

Career history
- 1949–1950: Tri-Cities Blackhawks

Career highlights
- Second-team All-American – Helms (1948)
- Stats at NBA.com
- Stats at Basketball Reference

Donald L. Ray (July 8, 1921 – November 23, 1998) was an American National Basketball Association (NBA) player. As a senior at Western Kentucky University, Ray was selected to the All-American second team by the Helms Foundation. Ray was drafted with the eleventh overall pick in the 1948 BAA Draft by the Philadelphia Warriors. He made his NBA debut in the 1949-50 NBA season for the Tri-Cities Blackhawks. In sixty-one games for the Blackhawks, Ray averaged 6.0 points and 1.0 assist per game.

== Career statistics ==
Legend
GP	Games played	GS	Games started	MPG	Minutes per game
FG%	Field goal percentage	3P%	3-point field goal percentage	FT%	Free throw percentage
RPG	Rebounds per game	APG	Assists per game	SPG	Steals per game
BPG	Blocks per game	PPG	Points per game	**Bold**	Career high

=== NBA ===
==== Regular season ====
Year	Team	GP	FG%	FT%	APG	PPG
1949–50	Tri-Cities	61	.323	.698	1.0	6.0

==== Playoffs ====
Year	Team	GP	FG%	FT%	APG	PPG
1949–50	Tri-Cities	3	.308	.909	.0	6.0
