= 1949–50 Tri-Cities Blackhawks season =

NBA professional basketball team season

- Head coach: Roger Potter (1–6); Red Auerbach (28–29)
- Arena: Wharton Field House

Results
- Record: 29–35 (.453)
- Place: Division: 3rd (Western)
- Playoff finish: West Division Semifinals (eliminated 1–2)
- Stats at Basketball Reference
- Radio: WQUA

The 1949–50 season was the Tri-Cities Blackhawks' fourth season of play and first in the National Basketball Association (NBA). This season was notable for it being the only season to have legendary head coach Red Auerbach (previously of the Washington Capitols) coaching the team, though he only be coaching for the vast majority of this season following previous head coach Roger Potter being fired for a dismal 1–6 start to the season. By the end of the season, the Tri-Cities Blackhawks would join the Indianapolis Olympians as the only teams from the Central Division from this season to end up playing beyond this season in the end, as four of the Central Division's teams would defect from the NBA to create a short-lived rivaling professional basketball league to compete against the NBA called the National Professional Basketball League. Not only that, but the Blackhawks franchise were the only team from that season's Central Division to survive up to this present day, albeit with them playing under the most recent name of the Atlanta Hawks instead, as the Olympians would fold operations after a few seasons due to two key players of theirs being permanently banned from the NBA and subsequently being forced to sell their shares of the team at a significant loss.

== Draft picks ==
The Tri-Cities Blackhawks would participate in the 1949 NBL draft, which occurred months before the National Basketball League and the rivaling Basketball Association of America would merge operations to become the present-day National Basketball Association. However, as of 2026, no records of what the Blackhawks' draft picks were for the NBL have properly come up, with any information on who those final selections might have been being lost to time in the process.

== Roster ==
1949–50 Tri-Cities Blackhawks roster
Players

| Pos. | No. | Player | Height | Weight | DOB | From |
|---|---|---|---|---|---|---|
| G/F | | Gene Berce | 5 ft 11 in (1.80 m) | 175 lb (79 kg) | | Marquette |
| F/C | 13 | John Chaney | 6 ft 3 in (1.91 m) | 185 lb (84 kg) | | LSU |
| SF | 11 | Dike Eddleman | 6 ft 3 in (1.91 m) | 189 lb (86 kg) | | Illinois |
| F/C | 12 | Gene Englund | 6 ft 5 in (1.96 m) | 205 lb (93 kg) | | Wisconsin |
| G/F | 18 | Dee Gibson | 5 ft 11 in (1.80 m) | 175 lb (79 kg) | | Western Kentucky |
| G | 8 | Billy Hassett | 5 ft 11 in (1.80 m) | 180 lb (82 kg) | | Notre Dame |
| C | 20 | Bill Henry | 6 ft 9 in (2.06 m) | 215 lb (98 kg) | | Rice |
| PF | 12 | Jack Kerris | 6 ft 6 in (1.98 m) | 215 lb (98 kg) | | Loyola Chicago |
| PG | 4 | Walt Kirk | 6 ft 3 in (1.91 m) | 173 lb (78 kg) | | Illinois |
| C | 12 | John Mahnken | 6 ft 8 in (2.03 m) | 220 lb (100 kg) | | Georgetown |
| PF | 15 | Jack Nichols | 6 ft 7 in (2.01 m) | 222 lb (101 kg) | | Washington |
| F/C | 9 | George Nostrand | 6 ft 8 in (2.03 m) | 195 lb (88 kg) | | Wyoming |
| C | 15 | Don Otten | 6 ft 10 in (2.08 m) | 240 lb (109 kg) | | Bowling Green |
| F/C | 20 | Mac Otten | 6 ft 7 in (2.01 m) | 220 lb (100 kg) | | Bowling Green |
| SG | | Red Owens | 6 ft 3 in (1.91 m) | 185 lb (84 kg) | | Baylor |
| G/F | 7 | Warren Perkins | 6 ft 3 in (1.91 m) | 190 lb (86 kg) | | Tulane |
| F/C | 96 | Don Ray | 6 ft 5 in (1.96 m) | 190 lb (86 kg) | | Western Kentucky |
| G/F | | Dick Schulz | 6 ft 2 in (1.88 m) | 192 lb (87 kg) | | Wisconsin |
| F/C | 21 | Mike Todorovich | 6 ft 5 in (1.96 m) | 220 lb (100 kg) | | Wyoming |
| G/F | 8 | Gene Vance | 6 ft 3 in (1.91 m) | 195 lb (88 kg) | | Illinois |
| G/F | 6 | Whitey Von Nieda | 6 ft 1 in (1.85 m) | 170 lb (77 kg) | | Penn State |
| G | 17 | Murray Wier | 5 ft 9 in (1.75 m) | 155 lb (70 kg) | | Iowa |

Coaches
Head coach
- Red Auerbach

Legend
- (DP) Unsigned draft pick
- (FA) Free agent
- (S) Suspended
- Injured

== Regular season ==
On October 29, the Blackhawks defeated the Denver Nuggets in the first ever NBA game following the NBL–BAA merger.

=== Season standings ===
| Western Division | W | L | PCT | GB | Home | Road | Neutral | Div |
|---|---|---|---|---|---|---|---|---|
| x-Indianapolis Olympians | 39 | 25 | .609 | – | 24–7 | 12–16 | 3–2 | 26–9 |
| x-Anderson Packers | 37 | 27 | .578 | 2 | 22–9 | 12–18 | 3–0 | 25–12 |
| x-Tri-Cities Blackhawks | 29 | 35 | .453 | 10 | 20–13 | 6–20 | 3–2 | 20–17 |
| x-Sheboygan Red Skins | 22 | 40 | .355 | 17 | 17–14 | 5–22 | 0–4 | 15–20 |
| Waterloo Hawks | 19 | 43 | .306 | 20 | 16–15 | 2–22 | 1–6 | 13–22 |
| Denver Nuggets | 11 | 51 | .177 | 28 | 9–16 | 1–25 | 1–10 | 8–27 |

=== Game log ===
1949–50 Game log
| # | Date | Opponent | Score | High points | Record |
| 1 | October 29 | Denver | 93–85 | Billy Hassett (15) | 1–0 |
| 2 | November 1 | St. Louis | 51–72 | Dwight Eddleman (14) | 1–1 |
| 3 | November 3 | @ Anderson | 87–110 | Don Otten (22) | 1–2 |
| 4 | November 5 | New York | 72–76 | Otten, Perkins (13) | 1–3 |
| 5 | November 9 | Anderson | 99–102 (3OT) | Otten, Owens (19) | 1–4 |
| 6 | November 12 | Waterloo | 99–89 | Billy Hassett (15) | 2–4 |
| 7 | November 15 | @ Rochester | 81–93 | Murray Wier (19) | 2–5 |
| 8 | November 17 | @ Syracuse | 76–79 | Don Ray (16) | 2–6 |
| 9 | November 19 | Fort Wayne | 85–88 | Billy Hassett (17) | 2–7 |
| 10 | November 20 | @ Waterloo | 62–75 | John Mahnken (15) | 2–8 |
| 11 | November 22 | Boston | 80–72 | Eddleman, Wier (19) | 3–8 |
| 12 | November 24 | @ Sheboygan | 113–120 | Dwight Eddleman (23) | 3–9 |
| 13 | November 27 | Indianapolis | 104–88 | Red Owens (21) | 4–9 |
| 14 | November 29 | @ Indianapolis | 76–92 | Eddleman, Mahnken, Perkins, Ray (11) | 4–10 |
| 15 | November 30 | St. Louis | 82–89 | Murray Wier (14) | 4–11 |
| 16 | December 1 | @ Anderson | 72–81 | Mike Todorovich (17) | 4–12 |
| 17 | December 3 | Boston | 87–82 | Don Otten (22) | 5–12 |
| 18 | December 7 | Syracuse | 69–77 | Mike Todorovich (15) | 5–13 |
| 19 | December 11 | Denver | 98–66 | Don Otten (19) | 6–13 |
| 20 | December 13 | @ Indianapolis | 63–84 | Mike Todorovich (20) | 6–14 |
| 21 | December 14 | Chicago | 73–68 | Don Otten (16) | 7–14 |
| 22 | December 15 | @ Sheboygan | 74–89 | Dwight Eddleman (11) | 7–15 |
| 23 | December 18 | Anderson | 69–78 | Don Ray (15) | 7–16 |
| 24 | December 21 | Syracuse | 84–96 | Mahnken, Todorovich, Wier (12) | 7–17 |
| 25 | December 26 | Minneapolis | 76–78 | Dwight Eddleman (14) | 7–18 |
| 26 | December 28 | @ Fort Wayne | 75–81 (OT) | Mike Todorovich (16) | 7–19 |
| 27 | December 30 | @ Denver | 85–83 | Mike Todorovich (16) | 8–19 |
| 28 | January 1 | Baltimore | 79–66 | Don Otten (15) | 9–19 |
| 29 | January 3 | @ Indianapolis | 76–78 | Dwight Eddleman (18) | 9–20 |
| 30 | January 5 | @ Syracuse | 73–82 | Mike Todorovich (17) | 9–21 |
| 31 | January 7 | Sheboygan | 98–86 | Dwight Eddleman (24) | 10–21 |
| 32 | January 11 | Anderson | 88–81 | Walt Kirk (19) | 11–21 |
| 33 | January 15 | Waterloo | 84–80 | Don Otten (24) | 12–21 |
| 34 | January 18 | Rochester | 65–70 | Don Otten (15) | 12–22 |
| 35 | January 19 | @ Chicago | 68–83 | Mike Todorovich (16) | 12–23 |
| 36 | January 22 | Denver | 111–97 | Murray Wier (17) | 13–23 |
| 37 | January 23 | @ Anderson | 99–96 | Dwight Eddleman (22) | 14–23 |
| 38 | January 25 | Washington | 62–65 | Don Otten (11) | 14–24 |
| 39 | January 28 | Indianapolis | 97–81 | Mike Todorovich (18) | 15–24 |
| 40 | January 29 | @ Waterloo | 85–79 | Mike Todorovich (25) | 16–24 |
| 41 | January 31 | New York | 83–77 | Mike Todorovich (17) | 17–24 |
| 42 | February 1 | Syracuse | 91–83 | Walt Kirk (16) | 18–24 |
| 43 | February 3 | @ Philadelphia | 72–83 | Mike Todorovich (15) | 18–25 |
| 44 | February 5 | Sheboygan | 86–71 | Mike Todorovich (22) | 19–25 |
| 45 | February 8 | Philadelphia | 99–94 (OT) | Warren Perkins (16) | 20–25 |
| 46 | February 9 | @ Sheboygan | 82–104 | Gene Englund (22) | 20–26 |
| 47 | February 12 | Indianapolis | 89–95 | Nichols, Todorovich (18) | 20–27 |
| 48 | February 15 | @ Washington | 85–81 | Dwight Eddleman (27) | 21–27 |
| 49 | February 16 | @ Syracuse | 74–105 | Dwight Eddleman (17) | 21–28 |
| 50 | February 18 | @ Waterloo | 116–93 | Mike Todorovich (17) | 22–28 |
| 51 | February 19 | @ Waterloo | 63–84 | Walt Kirk (13) | 22–29 |
| 52 | February 20 | Baltimore | 82–73 | Gene Vance (14) | 23–29 |
| 53 | February 22 | Anderson | 81–90 | Gene Englund (18) | 23–30 |
| 54 | February 25 | Sheboygan | 74–66 | Dwight Eddleman (20) | 24–30 |
| 55 | February 26 | @ Minneapolis | 66–80 | Murray Wier (13) | 24–31 |
| 56 | February 27 | Denver | 110–75 | Dwight Eddleman (22) | 25–31 |
| 57 | March 1 | Denver | 97–80 | Todorovich, Wier (17) | 26–31 |
| 58 | March 3 | @ Indianapolis | 96–83 | Dwight Eddleman (23) | 27–31 |
| 59 | March 5 | Denver | 91–80 | Jack Nichols (23) | 28–31 |
| 60 | March 6 | @ Anderson | 77–88 | Gene Vance (13) | 28–32 |
| 61 | March 8 | Anderson | 67–82 | Dwight Eddleman (15) | 28–33 |
| 62 | March 11 | Sheboygan | 97–79 | Dwight Eddleman (19) | 29–33 |
| 63 | March 18 | Syracuse | 88–89 (OT) | Jack Nichols (19) | 29–34 |
| 64 | March 19 | @ Waterloo | 77–79 | Jack Nichols (22) | 29–35 |

== NBA Playoffs ==
1950 playoff game log
Western Division Semifinals: 1–2 (home: 1–0; road: 0–2)

| Game | Date | Team | Score | High points | Location | Series |
|---|---|---|---|---|---|---|
| 1 | March 16 | @ Anderson | L 77–89 | Jack Nichols (27) | Anderson High School Wigwam | 0–1 |
| 2 | March 18 | Anderson | W 76–75 | Jack Nichols (23) | Wharton Field House | 1–1 |
| 3 | March 24 | @ Anderson | L 71–94 | Dike Eddleman (23) | Anderson High School Wigwam | 1–2 |

1950 schedule
