= Dee Gibson =

American basketball player

Personal information
- Born: August 25, 1923 Cleveland, Tennessee
- Died: April 8, 2003 (aged 79)
- Listed height: 5 ft 11 in (1.80 m)
- Listed weight: 175 lb (79 kg)

Career information
- High school: Bradley (Cleveland, Tennessee)
- College: Western Kentucky (1941–1943, 1946–1948)
- NBA draft: 1948: – round, –
- Drafted by: Minneapolis Lakers
- Playing career: 1948–1951
- Position: Forward / guard
- Number: 18

Career history
- 1948–1950: Tri-Cities Blackhawks
- 1950–1951: Louisville Alumnites

Career NBA statistics
- Points: 281 (6.4 ppg)
- Assists: 126 (2.9 apg)
- Stats at NBA.com
- Stats at Basketball Reference

Robert Dee Gibson Jr. (August 25, 1923 – April 8, 2003) was an American professional basketball player. He was selected in the 1948 BAA Draft by the Minneapolis Lakers. Gibson began his career for the Tri-Cities Blackhawks in the National Basketball League (NBL) in the 1948–49 season and stayed with the team when the NBL became the National Basketball Association (NBA) for the 1949–50 season. He then played in the short-lived National Professional Basketball League in 1950–51 for the Louisville Alumnites. He played in college for Western Kentucky University.

== Career statistics ==
Legend
GP	Games played	GS	Games started	MPG	Minutes per game
FG%	Field goal percentage	3P%	3-point field goal percentage	FT%	Free throw percentage
RPG	Rebounds per game	APG	Assists per game	SPG	Steals per game
BPG	Blocks per game	PPG	Points per game	**Bold**	Career high

=== NBA ===
==== Regular season ====
Year	Team	GP	FG%	FT%	APG	PPG
1949–50	Tri-Cities	44	.314	.718	2.9	6.4

==== Playoffs ====
Year	Team	GP	FG%	FT%	APG	PPG
1950	Tri-Cities	3	.364	.600	.7	3.7
