= Mike Todorovich =

American basketball player and coach (1923–2000)

Personal information
- Born: June 11, 1923 Zeigler, Illinois, U.S.
- Died: June 24, 2000 (aged 77) St. Louis, Missouri, U.S.
- Listed height: 6 ft 5 in (1.96 m)
- Listed weight: 220 lb (100 kg)

Career information
- High school: Soldan (St. Louis, Missouri)
- College: Wyoming (1946–1947); Washington University; Notre Dame
- BAA draft: 1947: undrafted
- Playing career: 1947–1951
- Position: Power forward / center
- Number: 9, 21, 19

Career history

Playing
- 1947–1949: Sheboygan Red Skins
- 1949: St. Louis Bombers
- 1949–1951: Tri-Cities Blackhawks

Coaching
- 1950–1951: Tri-Cities Blackhawks

Career highlights
- NBL All-Time Team; All-NBL First Team (1948); All-NBL Second Team (1949); NBL Rookie of the Year (1948)
- Stats at NBA.com
- Stats at Basketball Reference

Marko John "Mike" Todorovich (June 11, 1923 – June 24, 2000) was an American basketball player and coach of Serbian descent born in St. Louis, Missouri. He played college basketball for the Wyoming Cowboys. He also played college football at Washington University in St. Louis and the University of Notre Dame.

Todorovich began his professional career with the Sheboygan Red Skins of the National Basketball League (NBL). He was named NBL rookie of the year and chosen a first-team pick after a 1947–48 season in which he scored 777 points in 60 games. The other four first-team selections from that season—Jim Pollard, George Mikan, Red Holzman and Al Cervi—are enshrined in the Naismith Memorial Basketball Hall of Fame. Sheboygan, however, suffered through a season of turmoil and finished with the second-worst record (23–37) in the franchise's 13-season history. The following season, Todorovich again led the Red Skins in scoring, with 648 points in 60 games, and Sheboygan finished with a 35–29 record. He was named to the NBL's second team.

Later, he played for the St. Louis Bombers and the Tri-Cities Blackhawks. He later would coach the Blackhawks for several games.

== Career playing statistics ==
=== NBA ===
Legend
GP	Games played	GS	Games started	MPG	Minutes per game
FG%	Field goal percentage	3P%	3-point field goal percentage	FT%	Free throw percentage
RPG	Rebounds per game	APG	Assists per game	SPG	Steals per game
BPG	Blocks per game	PPG	Points per game	**Bold**	Career high

==== Regular season ====
Year	Team	GP	FG%	FT%	RPG	APG	PPG
1949–50	St. Louis	14	.267	.625		1.4	6.9
1949–50	Tri-Cities	51	**.315**	**.736**		**3.7**	**13.6**
1950–51	Tri-Cities	**66**	.309	.701	6.9	2.7	9.9
Career		131	.309	.711	6.9	2.9	11.0

==== Playoffs ====
Year	Team	GP	FG%	FT%	RPG	APG	PPG
1949–50	Tri-Cities	3	.194	.792		2.7	10.3

== Head coaching record ==
Legend
Regular season	G	Games coached	W	Games won	L	Games lost	W–L %	Win–loss %
Playoffs	PG	Playoff games	PW	Playoff wins	PL	Playoff losses	PW–L %	Playoff win–loss %

Team	Year	G	W	L	W–L%	Finish	PG	PW	PL	PW–L%	Result
Tri-Cities	1950–51	42	14	28	.333	5th in Western	—	—	—	—	Missed playoffs
