= Roger Potter =

American basketball coach

Personal information
- Born: October 5, 1907 Albany, Illinois, U.S.
- Died: June 8, 1982 (aged 74) Moline, Illinois, U.S.

Career information
- College: Illinois
- Coaching career: 1930–1949

Career history

Coaching
- 1930–1940: Moline HS (assistant)
- 1940–1944, 1946–1948: Moline HS (assistant)
- 1949: Tri-Cities Blackhawks

Career coaching record
- NBA: 1–4 (.200)
- Record at Basketball Reference

Roger David Potter (October 5, 1907 – June 8, 1982) was an American professional basketball coach. He was the first head coach of the Tri-Cities Blackhawks (now the Atlanta Hawks) in the National Basketball Association (NBA) during the 1949–50 season. Potter accumulated a 1–4 record until his replacement by Red Auerbach.

== Early life ==
Potter was born on October 5, 1907, in Albany, Illinois. His father was a Methodist minister and Potter moved frequently as a child due to his father's work. Potter's family settled in Champaign, Illinois, when he was aged 11 after his father's death. Potter attended the University of Illinois where he participated in basketball, football and track.

== Coaching career ==
Potter was hired as an assistant coach for the basketball, football and track teams at Moline High School under head coach George Senneff in 1930. He took over as head coach of the basketball team after Senneff's retirement in 1940. Potter's coaching career was interrupted when he served two years as a naval gunnery officer on a merchant marine supply ship during World War II and he returned in 1946. Potter resigned as head coach in 1948 with a record of 99–55. He worked for Dairy Queen for a year in Worcester, Massachusetts. Potter returned to Moline to enter the insurance and real estate business while he also worked as a basketball columnist for The Dispatch.

On February 14, 1949, Potter was announced as head coach of the Tri-Cities Blackhawks of the National Basketball League (NBL). He replaced player-coach Bobby McDermott in a move that "came as a surprise." Potter led the Blackhawks to a 12–7 record during the 1948–49 season. The Blackhawks moved to the newly-formed National Basketball Association (NBA) for the 1949–50 season. On November 9, 1949, Potter had accumulated a 1–4 record when he was dismissed as head coach and replaced by Red Auerbach.

== Later life ==
Potter returned to the insurance business after his coaching career ended. He was elected to the school board, served a term as Republican assistant township supervisor and was on the church board of the First United Methodist Church in Moline. Potter was hired by John Deere Junior High School to teach general business in 1961. He became the Moline High School athletic director in 1966 and remained in that position until his retirement in 1973.

== Personal life ==
Potter married Rita Wylie in 1931 in Rock Falls, Illinois. He had one son.

Potter died on June 8, 1982, in the Moline Public Hospital. He had a long illness of cancer.

== Head coaching record ==
Legend
Regular season	G	Games coached	W	Games won	L	Games lost	W–L %	Win–loss %
Playoffs	PG	Playoff games	PW	Playoff wins	PL	Playoff losses	PW–L %	Playoff win–loss %

Team	Year	G	W	L	W–L%	Finish	PG	PW	PL	PW–L%	Result
Tri-Cities	1949–50	5	1	4	.200	(replaced)	—	—	—	—	—
