= Don Otten =

American basketball player

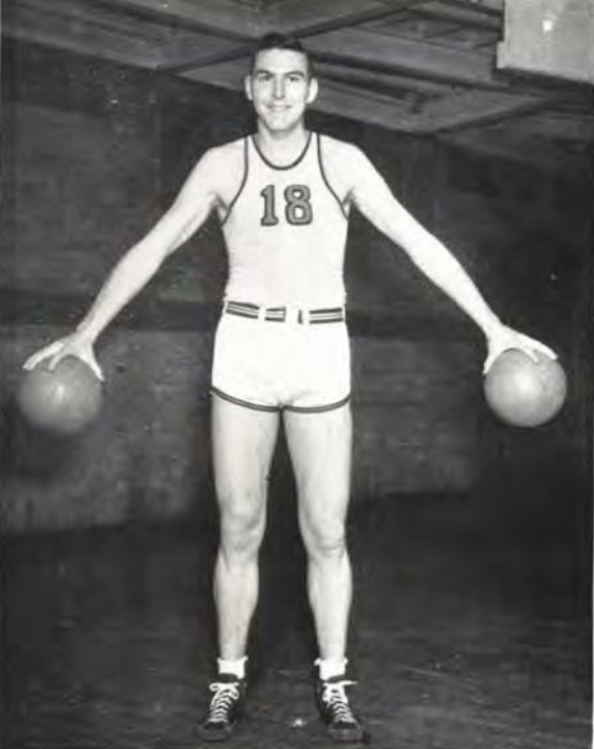
- Otten in his senior season at Bowling Green

Personal information
- Born: April 18, 1921 Bellefontaine, Ohio, U.S.
- Died: September 18, 1985 (aged 64)
- Listed height: 6 ft 10 in (2.08 m)
- Listed weight: 240 lb (109 kg)

Career information
- High school: Bellefontaine (Bellefontaine, Ohio)
- College: Bowling Green (1942–1946)
- Playing career: 1946–1953
- Position: Center
- Number: 15, 13, 17, 14

Career history
- 1946–1950: Buffalo Bisons / Tri-Cities Blackhawks
- 1950: Washington Capitols
- 1950: Baltimore Bullets
- 1950–1951: Fort Wayne Pistons
- 1951–1953: Milwaukee Hawks

Career highlights
- NBL Most Valuable Player (1949); All-NBL First Team (1949); All-NBL Second Team (1948); NBL scoring champion (1949); 2× Second-team All-American – Helms (1945, 1946); Second-team All-American – Converse (1946)

Career NBA statistics
- Points: 2,294 (10.5 ppg)
- Rebounds: 928 (6.0 rpg)
- Assists: 297 (1.4 apg)
- Stats at NBA.com
- Stats at Basketball Reference

Donald Frederick Otten (April 18, 1921 – September 18, 1985) was an American professional basketball player.

A 6'10" center from Bellefontaine High School (Ohio) and Bowling Green State University, Otten began his professional career in 1946 with the Buffalo Bisons turned Tri-Cities Blackhawks of the National Basketball League. During the 1948–49 NBL season, Otten averaged 14.0 points per game and earned league MVP honors. As a result of this first season in the NBL, Otten would be one of eight former Buffalo Bisons players to continue playing for the team following their move from Buffalo, New York to Moline, Illinois (which represented what was called the "Tri-Cities" area at the time) to play for the Tri-Cities Blackhawks team that became the present-day Atlanta Hawks. The Blackhawks joined the National Basketball Association (NBA) in 1949, and Otten continued playing until 1953, competing for Tri-Cities as well as the Washington Capitols, Baltimore Bullets, Fort Wayne Pistons, and Milwaukee Hawks. He averaged 10.5 points per game in his NBA career. Don's brother Mac Otten also played in the NBA. In 1949, Don and Mac became the first ever pair of brothers to play for the same team in the NBA.

Otten is tied with Lew Hitch at first for the NBA record for most personal fouls in a game, with eight. He set the record in a November 24, 1949 game between Tri-Cities and the Sheboygan Red Skins. NBA Rule 3, Section I permits a player to remain in the game after fouling out if no other players are available on the bench.

== NBA career statistics ==
Legend
GP	Games played	GS	Games started	MPG	Minutes per game
FG%	Field goal percentage	3P%	3-point field goal percentage	FT%	Free throw percentage
RPG	Rebounds per game	APG	Assists per game	SPG	Steals per game
BPG	Blocks per game	PPG	Points per game	**Bold**	Career high

=== Regular season ===
Year	Team	GP	MPG	FG%	FT%	RPG	APG	PPG
1949–50	Tri-Cities	46	–	.366	.717	–	1.6	12.1
1949–50	Washington	18	–	.391	.777	–	1.0	**14.9**
1950–51	Washington	16	–	.291	.796	6.6	1.4	9.3
1950–51	Baltimore	2	–	.200	.556	1.5	1.5	5.5
1950–51	Fort Wayne	49	–	.362	**.811**	6.0	0.8	8.4
1951–52	Fort Wayne	7	9.0	.250	.875	2.9	0.7	3.4
1951–52	Milwaukee	**57**	**30.3**	.352	.769	**7.3**	**2.1**	13.0
1952–53	Milwaukee	24	16.0	**.391**	.703	3.7	0.9	5.5
Career		219	24.7	.357	.761	6.0	1.4	10.5

=== Playoffs ===
Year	Team	GP	MPG	FG%	FT%	RPG	APG	PPG
1950	Washington	2	–	**.400**	.808	–	**3.0**	**20.5**
1951	Fort Wayne	**3**	–	.308	**.813**	6.3	2.7	9.7
Career		5	–	.353	.810	6.3	2.8	14.0
