= List of 1950–51 NBA season transactions =

This is a list of all personnel changes for the 1950 NBA off-season and 1950–51 NBA season.

== Events ==
=== August ?, 1950 ===
- The Baltimore Bullets signed Billy Hassett as a free agent.

=== August 10, 1950 ===
- The New York Knicks traded Paul Noel to the Rochester Royals for Ray Ellefson.

=== September 23, 1950 ===
- The Sheboygan Red Skins sold Bob Brannum to the Boston Celtics.
- The Rochester Royals signed Odie Spears as a free agent.

=== October ?, 1950 ===
- The Baltimore Bullets signed Ray Corley as a free agent.

=== October 5, 1950 ===
- The Fort Wayne Pistons selected Larry Foust from the Chicago Stags in the dispersal draft.
- The Washington Capitols selected Frank Kudelka from the Chicago Stags in the dispersal draft.
- The Washington Capitols selected Joe Bradley from the Chicago Stags in the dispersal draft.
- The Tri-Cities Blackhawks selected Kleggie Hermsen from the Chicago Stags in the dispersal draft.
- The New York Knicks selected Max Zaslofsky from the Chicago Stags in the dispersal draft.
- The Boston Celtics selected Bob Cousy from the Chicago Stags in the dispersal draft.
- The Philadelphia Warriors selected Andy Phillip from the Chicago Stags in the dispersal draft.

=== October 12, 1950 ===
- The Syracuse Nationals waived Ray Corley.

=== October 20, 1950 ===
- The Indianapolis Olympians selected Leo Barnhorst from the Chicago Stags in the dispersal draft. Barnhort was turned over to NBA after Chicago folded and sold to Indianapolis.

=== November 5, 1950 ===
- The Baltimore Bullets sold Harry Boykoff to the Boston Celtics.

=== November 22, 1950 ===
- The New York Knicks signed Tony Lavelli as a free agent.

=== November 29, 1950 ===
- The Baltimore Bullets claimed Gene James on waivers from the New York Knicks.
- The Syracuse Nationals sold Ed Bartels to the Baltimore Bullets.
- The Rochester Royals sold Ed Mikan to the Washington Capitols.
- The Washington Capitols sold Don Otten to the Baltimore Bullets.

=== December 1, 1950 ===
- The Baltimore Bullets traded Dick Mehen to the Boston Celtics for Kenny Sailors and Brady Walker.

=== December 4, 1950 ===
- The Baltimore Bullets signed Don Carlson as a free agent.

=== December 8, 1950 ===
- The Fort Wayne Pistons sold John Hargis to the Tri-Cities Blackhawks.
- The Baltimore Bullets sold Don Otten to the Fort Wayne Pistons.

=== December 10, 1950 ===
- The Syracuse Nationals sold Belus Smawley to the Baltimore Bullets.

=== December 11, 1950 ===
- The Minneapolis Lakers sold Ed Beach to the Tri-Cities Blackhawks.

=== December 13, 1950 ===
- The Tri-Cities Blackhawks traded Noble Jorgensen and cash to the Syracuse Nationals for Ed Peterson.

=== December 19, 1950 ===
- The Fort Wayne Pistons traded Bob Harris to the Boston Celtics for Dick Mehen.

=== January 9, 1951 ===
- The Baltimore Bullets selected Chick Halbert from the Washington Capitols in the dispersal draft.
- The Fort Wayne Pistons selected Bill Sharman from the Washington Capitols in the dispersal draft.
- The Minneapolis Lakers selected Dick Schnittker from the Washington Capitols in the dispersal draft.
- The Syracuse Nationals selected Fred Scolari from the Washington Capitols in the dispersal draft.
- The Boston Celtics selected Frank Kudelka from the Washington Capitols in the dispersal draft.
- The Syracuse Nationals selected Earl Lloyd from the Washington Capitols in the dispersal draft.
- The Boston Celtics selected Bones McKinney from the Washington Capitols in the dispersal draft.
- The Tri-Cities Blackhawks selected Alan Sawyer from the Washington Capitols in the dispersal draft.

=== January 17, 1951 ===
- The Philadelphia Warriors signed Ed Mikan as a free agent.

=== January 18, 1951 ===
- The Baltimore Bullets fired Buddy Jeannette as head coach.
- The Baltimore Bullets appointed Walt Budko as interim head coach.

=== February 3, 1951 ===
- The Tri-Cities Blackhawks traded Kleggie Hermsen to the Boston Celtics for Harry Boykoff.

=== February 12, 1951 ===
- The Syracuse Nationals sold Don Lofgran to the Indianapolis Olympians.
- The Boston Celtics sold John Mahnken to the Indianapolis Olympians.

=== February 15, 1951 ===
- The Baltimore Bullets sold Ken Murray to the Fort Wayne Pistons.

=== February 22, 1951 ===
- Cliff Barker resigned as head coach for Indianapolis Olympians.
- The Indianapolis Olympians appointed Wally Jones as interim head coach.

=== April 10, 1951 ===
- The Fort Wayne Pistons hired Paul Birch as head coach.

=== April 26, 1951 ===
- The Fort Wayne Pistons traded Bill Sharman to the Boston Celtics for Chuck Share. Some sources have Bob Brannum to Boston in this deal but he was already sold to them on September 23, 1950.

=== May 31, 1951 ===
- The Tri-Cities Blackhawks traded Frankie Brian to the Fort Wayne Pistons for Dick Mehen, Howie Schultz and cash.

=== June 30, 1951 ===
- The Indianapolis Olympians hired Herm Schaefer as head coach.

== Notes ==
- ^{a} Number of years played in the BAA prior to the draft
- ^{b} Career with the franchise that drafted the player
- ^{c} Never played a game for the franchise
