= 1949–50 Chicago Stags season =

- Head coach: Philip Brownstein
- Arena: Chicago Stadium

Results
- Record: 40–28 (.588)
- Place: Division: 4th (Central)
- Playoff finish: Division semifinals (eliminated 0-2)
- Stats at Basketball Reference

Local media
- Television: none
- Radio: WCFL; Joe Boland

The 1949–50 Chicago Stags season was the fourth and final season for the Chicago Stags of the National Basketball Association (NBA). The team ceased operations after the season, and Chicago would be left without an NBA team until 1961.

== BAA/NBA draft ==
Round	Pick	Player	Position	Nationality	School/Club team
1	9	Jack Kerris	F/C	United States	Loyola (IL)
2	21	Ralph Beard	G	United States	Kentucky
3	33	Dwight Eddleman	F/G	United States	Illinois

== Roster ==
1949–50 Chicago Stags roster
Players

Pos.	No.	Player	Height	Weight	DOB	From
G/F		Leo Barnhorst	6 ft 4 in (1.93 m)	190 lb (86 kg)		Notre Dame
G	12	Joe Bradley	6 ft 3 in (1.91 m)	175 lb (79 kg)		Oklahoma State
F/C	15	Joe Graboski	6 ft 7 in (2.01 m)	195 lb (88 kg)		Tuley HS (Chicago)
C	9	Bob Hahn	6 ft 10 in (2.08 m)	240 lb (109 kg)		NC State
F/C	13	Kleggie Hermsen	6 ft 9 in (2.06 m)	225 lb (102 kg)		Minnesota
G/F	7	Frank Kudelka	6 ft 2 in (1.88 m)	193 lb (88 kg)		Saint Mary's
F/C	17	Stan Miasek	6 ft 5 in (1.96 m)	210 lb (95 kg)		Textile HS (NY)
F/C	18	Ed Mikan	6 ft 8 in (2.03 m)	230 lb (104 kg)		DePaul
F/C	18	George Nostrand	6 ft 8 in (2.03 m)	195 lb (88 kg)		Wyoming
G/F	19	Andy Phillip	6 ft 2 in (1.88 m)	195 lb (88 kg)		Illinois
G	16	Kenny Rollins	6 ft 0 in (1.83 m)	168 lb (76 kg)		Kentucky
G	20	Odie Spears	6 ft 5 in (1.96 m)	205 lb (93 kg)		Western Kentucky
G/F	10	Max Zaslofsky	6 ft 2 in (1.88 m)	170 lb (77 kg)		St. John's

Coaches
Head coach
- Philip Brownstein

Legend
- (DP) Unsigned draft pick
- (FA) Free agent
- (S) Suspended
- Injured

== Regular season ==
=== Season standings ===
Central Division	W	L	PCT	GB	Home	Road	Neutral	Div
x-Minneapolis Lakers	51	17	.750	–	30–1	18–16	3–0	16–8
x-Rochester Royals	51	17	.750	–	33–1	17–16	1–0	15–9
x-Fort Wayne Pistons	40	28	.588	11	28–6	12–22	–	14–10
x-Chicago Stags	40	28	.588	11	18–6	14–21	8–1	11–13
St. Louis Bombers	26	42	.382	25	17–14	7–26	2–2	4–20

=== Game log ===
#	Date	Opponent	Score	High points	Venue	Record
1	November 1	New York	L 87–89 (OT)	Stan Miasek (18)		0–1
2	November 5	Boston	W 86–70	Max Zaslofsky (22)		1–1
3	November 6	at Fort Wayne	L 70–87	Stan Miasek (17)		1–2
4	November 9	Rochester	W 75–72 (OT)	Spears, Zaslofsky (19)		2–2
5	November 10	vs Denver	W 64–53	Max Zaslofsky (15)		3–2
6	November 12	Minneapolis	W 86–79	Odie Spears (25)		4–2
7	November 13	at St. Louis	W 91–65	Max Zaslofsky (20)		5–2
8	November 15	vs. Washington	W 77–63	Max Zaslofsky (18)		6–2
9	November 16	Fort Wayne	W 85–72	Odie Spears (17)		7–2
10	November 18	at Philadelphia	L 88–103	Barnhorst, Mikan (15)		7–3
11	November 19	at Washington	L 69–85	Odie Spears (19)		7–4
12	November 23	Indianapolis	W 92–72	Andy Phillip (21)		8–4
13	November 26	Philadelphia	W 90–54	Max Zaslofsky (15)		9–4
14	November 27	at Minneapolis	W 96–82	Max Zaslofsky (23)		10–4
15	November 30	Baltimore	W 57–50	Odie Spears (13)		11–4
16	December 1	at Sheboygan	W 80–78	Ed Mikan (16)		12–4
17	December 3	Minneapolis	L 80–91	Max Zaslofsky (21)		12–5
18	December 6	Washington	W 75–55	Max Zaslofsky (18)		13–5
19	December 7	at Baltimore	W 84–72	Stan Miasek (17)		14–5
20	December 9	at Philadelphia	L 77–80	Max Zaslofsky (20)		14–6
21	December 10	at New York	L 91–93 (OT)	Max Zaslofsky (22)		14–7
22	December 13	Philadelphia	W 75–65	Odie Spears (18)		15–7
23	December 14	at Tri-Cities	L 68–73	Max Zaslofsky (23)		15–8
24	December 16	Rochester	W 80–71	Max Zaslofsky (17)		16–8
25	December 17	at Rochester	L 63–85	Odie Spears (14)		16–9
26	December 18	at Syracuse	L 73–86	Max Zaslofsky (21)		16–10
27	December 20	New York	W 79–77	Andy Phillip (15)		17–10
28	December 21	vs Waterloo	W 78–70	Odie Spears (14)		18–10
29	December 22	at Indianapolis	L 92–104	Andy Phillip (16)		18–11
30	December 26	at Fort Wayne	L 74–76	Andy Phillip (18)		18–12
31	December 28	at Waterloo	W 87–80	Max Zaslofsky (22)		19–12
32	December 29	at Anderson	W 81–80	Odie Spears (19)		20–12
33	January 1	at Denver	W 92–78	Andy Phillip (19)		21–12
34	January 10	at Washington	L 71–86	Max Zaslofsky (15)		21–13
35	January 13	at Boston	W 77–76	Max Zaslofsky (21)		22–13
36	January 14	at Baltimore	W 83–78	Kleggie Hermsen (22)		23–13
37	January 16	St. Louis	W 78–69	Max Zaslofsky (23)		24–13
38	January 19	Tri-Cities	W 83–68	Max Zaslofsky (30)		25–13
39	January 22	at Minneapolis	L 75–103	Odie Spears (15)		25–14
40	January 24	Minneapolis	L 68–80	Max Zaslofsky (22)		25–15
41	January 29	at St. Louis	W 66–51	Max Zaslofsky (14)		26–15
42	January 31	Fort Wayne	L 89–93	Hermsen, Zaslofsky (19)		26–16
43	February 1	vs. Boston	W 78–76	Max Zaslofsky (17)		27–16
44	February 3	vs. Baltimore	W 98–81	Max Zaslofsky (25)		28–16
45	February 4	at Rochester	L 78–82	Max Zaslofsky (22)		28–17
46	February 5	vs. Boston	W 77–70	Max Zaslofsky (19)		29–17
47	February 7	at Boston	W 91–86	Max Zaslofsky (23)		30–17
48	February 10	at Philadelphia	W 83–76	Max Zaslofsky (17)		31–17
49	February 11	at New York	W 75–85	Max Zaslofsky (14)		31–18
50	February 14	Rochester	L 74–83	Max Zaslofsky (21)		31–19
51	February 19	at Minneapolis	L 83–96	Max Zaslofsky (17)		31–20
52	February 21	Baltimore	W 72–64	Andy Phillip (16)		32–20
53	February 24	St. Louis	W 77–62	Max Zaslofsky (21)		33–20
54	February 25	at New York	L 79–86	Max Zaslofsky (20)		33–21
55	February 26	at Syracuse	L 64–73	Stan Miasek (11)		33–22
56	February 27	at Boston	W 79–77	Max Zaslofsky (35)		34–22
57	February 28	at Rochester	L 69–74	Leo Barnhorst (20)		34–23
58	March 1	vs. Washington	W 76–75	Max Zaslofsky (15)		35–23
59	March 2	at Washington	L 88–91	Max Zaslofsky (20)		35–24
60	March 4	at Baltimore	L 72–77	Andy Phillip (20)		35–25
61	March 5	Anderson	L 73–89	Barnhorst, Kudelka (12)		35–26
62	March 9	at Fort Wayne	L 71–84	Max Zaslofsky (18)		35–27
63	March 11	Fort Wayne	W 90–88	Max Zaslofsky (24)		36–27
64	March 12	vs. Philadelphia	W 73–67	Hermsen, Spears (16)		37–27
65	March 14	New York	W 85–75	Max Zaslofsky (22)		38–27
66	March 17	vs. St. Louis	L 69–85	Max Zaslofsky (19)		38–28
67	March 18	Sheboygan	W 66–63	Andy Phillip (17)		39–28
68	March 19	at St. Louis	W 80–64	Andy Phillip (16)		40–28

== NBA Playoffs ==
=== NBA Central Division Semifinals ===
(1) Minneapolis Lakers vs. (4) Chicago Stags: Lakers win series 2-0

- Game 1 @ Minneapolis (March 22): Minneapolis 85, Chicago 75
- Game 2 @ Chicago (March 25): Minneapolis 75, Chicago 67

Last playoff meeting: 1949 BAA Western Division Semifinals (Minneapolis won 2–0)

== Dispersal Draft ==
Originally, the Stags were considered to be a part of the new, upcoming NBA season, to the point where they participated in the 1950 NBA draft (the first official NBA draft held by the National Basketball Association under that name) without much issue there. In the only draft the Stags did while in the NBA instead of the prior Basketball Association of America name, they would draft Larry Foust from La Salle College (now La Salle University), Wally Osterkorn from the University of Illinois, Lou Watson from Indiana University Bloomington, Ken Murray from St. Bonaventure's College (now St. Bonaventure University), Don Stroot from the University of Missouri, Stu Inman from San Jose State College (now San Jose State University), Milt Whitehead from the University of Nebraska, George King from Morris Harvey College (now the University of Charleston), John Brown from Georgetown University, and Bob Schaeffer from Wheaton College (Massachusetts) as their final selections ever made, with Bob Cousy from the College of the Holy Cross also being acquired from the Tri-Cities Blackhawks after they failed to meet his demands for him. During the offseason period, the Stags were supposed to be bought by Harlem Globetrotters owner Abe Saperstein, who by August had considered rebranding the Stags into the Chicago Bruins going forward. However, ownership/monetary issues ended up causing the official demise of the first ever Chicago franchise held by the NBA on September 25, 1950 (effectively ending themselves over a month before beginning the upcoming NBA season on October 31, 1950), which led to the NBA holding their second official dispersal draft of the 1950–51 NBA season on October 5, 1950. The rights to one of Chicago's players, Leo Barnhorst, was held in abeyance due to several teams wanting his services before he eventually was picked up by the Indianapolis Olympians fifteen days after the dispersal draft for Chicago's players initially concluded on October 20, 1950. As for everyone else that was on the Stags (who were considered to be the Bruins entering the upcoming season) at the time, the following teams acquired these players from Chicago during the dispersal draft period.

- Boston Celtics: Bob Cousy (a key player for the franchise for years to come)
- Fort Wayne Pistons: Larry Foust
- New York Knicks: Max Zaslofsky
- Philadelphia Warriors: Andy Phillip
- Tri-Cities Blackhawks: Kleggie Hermsen
- Washington Capitols: Joe Bradley & Frank Kudelka

Following the Washington Capitols later folding operations and the New York Knicks threatening to leave the NBA themselves during the 1950–51 NBA season after witnessing what was seen as "disgraceful conduct" from their stateside rivals of the time in the Syracuse Nationals and player-coach Al Cervi (alongside rumors of the Tri-Cities Blackhawks being sold, relocated, or otherwise defecting to the recently created National Professional Basketball League themselves), the Chicago Stags / Bruins under Abe Saperstein's ownership attempted to file a lawsuit against the NBA to get their franchise reinstated back into the league properly, though Saperstein would ultimately fail to get the desired results that he would hope to get from that lawsuit in question.
