= Toomay =

Toomay is a surname. Notable people with the surname include:

- Jack Toomay (1922–2008), American basketball player
- Pat Toomay (born 1948), American football player
