= Frank Kudelka =

Frank Kudelka may refer to:

- Frank Kudelka (basketball) (1925-1993), American basketball player
- Frank Kudelka (football manager) (born 1961), Argentine football manager
