= Guokas =

Guokas is a surname. Notable people with the surname include:

- Al Guokas (1925–1990), American basketball player
- Matt Guokas, Sr. (1915–1993), American basketball player and broadcaster, father of Matt
- Matt Guokas (born 1944), American basketball player, coach, and broadcaster
