= 1949–50 Sheboygan Red Skins season =

- Head coach: Ken Suesens
- Arena: Sheboygan Municipal Auditorium and Armory

Results
- Record: 22–40 (.355)
- Place: Division: 4th (Western)
- Playoff finish: Division semifinals (eliminated 1–2)
- Stats at Basketball Reference
- Radio: WHBL

The 1949–50 Sheboygan Red Skins season was the only season for the Sheboygan Red Skins in the National Basketball Association (NBA). It was also the 12th professional basketball season in Sheboygan's history, including the eleven previous seasons they played in the National Basketball League before this season, and their 17th overall season of play when including independent seasons where they went under different team names during those years instead like The Ballhorns, the Art Imigs (with jerseys spelled out as the "Art Imig's"), and the Enzo Jels (sometimes misspelled as the "Enzo Gels"). After this season ended for Sheboygan, the Red Skins would leave the NBA on April 24, 1950 (one day before the 1950 NBA draft began) and join the original Denver Nuggets franchise, the Waterloo Hawks, and the Anderson Packers (who previously withdrew from the NBA themselves weeks earlier) following pressure from other big markets alongside the higher costs of the newly-formed NBA being too much to bare for them by comparison to their previous seasons in the NBL led to them creating the short-lived rivaling National Professional Basketball League as a failed effort to survive beyond the NBA, though unlike the other teams, Sheboygan would manage to survive a few extra years longer than them as an independent team afterward due to their previous long-term history as such.

== Draft picks ==
The Sheboygan Red Skins would participate in the 1949 NBL draft, which occurred months before the National Basketball League and the rivaling Basketball Association of America would merge operations to become the present-day National Basketball Association. However, as of 2026, no records of what the Red Skins' draft picks were for the NBL have properly come up, with any information on who those final selections might have been being lost to time in the process.

== Roster ==
1949–50 Sheboygan Red Skins roster
Players

Pos.	No.	Player	Height	Weight	DOB	From
F/C	7	Bob Brannum	6 ft 5 in (1.96 m)	215 lb (98 kg)		Michigan State
G	5	Jack Burmaster	6 ft 3 in (1.91 m)	190 lb (86 kg)		Illinois
F/C	4	John Chaney	6 ft 3 in (1.91 m)	185 lb (84 kg)		LSU
G/F	3	Bobby Cook	5 ft 10 in (1.78 m)	155 lb (70 kg)		Wisconsin
G/F	8	Don Grate	6 ft 2 in (1.88 m)	185 lb (84 kg)		Ohio State
C	15	Noble Jorgensen	6 ft 9 in (2.06 m)	228 lb (103 kg)		Iowa
G/F	9	Walt Lautenbach	6 ft 2 in (1.88 m)	185 lb (84 kg)		Wisconsin
F	8	Matt Mazza	6 ft 3 in (1.91 m)	210 lb (95 kg)		Michigan State
F/C	11	Max Morris	6 ft 2 in (1.88 m)	195 lb (88 kg)		Northwestern
G/F	8	Stan Patrick	6 ft 2 in (1.88 m)	185 lb (84 kg)		Illinois
F	12	Jack Phelan	6 ft 5 in (1.96 m)	195 lb (88 kg)		DePaul
C	14	Milt Schoon	6 ft 7 in (2.01 m)	230 lb (104 kg)		Valparaiso
G/F	4	Dick Schulz	6 ft 2 in (1.88 m)	192 lb (87 kg)		Wisconsin
G/F	12	Glen Selbo	6 ft 3 in (1.91 m)	196 lb (89 kg)		Wisconsin
G/F	6	Chips Sobek	6 ft 0 in (1.83 m)	180 lb (82 kg)		Notre Dame
G	5	Danny Wagner	6 ft 0 in (1.83 m)	170 lb (77 kg)		Texas
G	4	Bob Wood	5 ft 10 in (1.78 m)	175 lb (79 kg)		Northern Illinois

Coaches
Head coach
- Ken Suesens

Legend
- (DP) Unsigned draft pick
- (FA) Free agent
- (S) Suspended
- Injured

== Regular season ==
=== Season standings ===
Western Division	W	L	PCT	GB	Home	Road	Neutral	Div
x-Indianapolis Olympians	39	25	.609	–	24–7	12–16	3–2	26–9
x-Anderson Packers	37	27	.578	2	22–9	12–18	3–0	25–12
x-Tri-Cities Blackhawks	29	35	.453	10	20–13	6–20	3–2	20–17
x-Sheboygan Red Skins	22	40	.355	17	17–14	5–22	0–4	15–20
Waterloo Hawks	19	43	.306	20	16–15	2–22	1–6	13–22
Denver Nuggets	11	51	.177	28	9–16	1–25	1–10	8–27

=== Game log ===
1949–50 game log
Total: 22–40
November

Game	Date	Team	Score	High points	Location Attendance	Record
1	November 1	at Rochester	L 75–108	Noble Jorgensen (16)		0–1
2	November 3	Boston	W 98–83	Brannum, Cook (16)		1–1
3	November 6	New York	W 99–93	Bobby Cook (19)		2–1
4	November 10	Rochester	W 97–87	Noble Jorgensen (25)		3–1
5	November 13	Indianapolis	W 104–101	Noble Jorgensen (19)		4–1
6	November 16	at Waterloo	W 76–73	Noble Jorgensen (21)		5–1
7	November 17	Waterloo	W 97–95	Noble Jorgensen (28)		6–1
8	November 20	Baltimore	L 92–97	Noble Jorgensen (35)		6–2
9	November 24	Tri-Cities	W 120–113	Noble Jorgensen (27)		7–2
10	November 26	at Indianapolis	L 59–85	Noble Jorgensen (13)		7–3
11	November 27	Anderson	L 91–111	Noble Jorgensen (20)		7–4

December

Game	Date	Team	Score	High points	Location Attendance	Record
12	December 1	Chicago	L 78–80	Noble Jorgensen (17)		7–5
13	December 3	St. Louis	L 72–75	Bobby Cook (18)		7–6
14	December 5	at Anderson	L 81–88	Max Morris (16)		7–7
15	December 7	at Waterloo	L 67–77	Bobby Cook (22)		7–8
16	December 8	Syracuse	L 72–86	Max Morris (18)		7–9
17	December 10	vs. Boston	L 78–83	Milt Schoon (24)		7–10
18	December 11	at Syracuse	L 72–89	Jack Burmaster (14)		7–11
19	December 15	Tri-Cities	W 89–74	Bobby Cook (25)		8–11
20	December 17	Anderson	W 110–91	Bobby Cook (27)		9–11
21	December 22	Syracuse	L 74–83	Max Morris (19)		9–12
22	December 25	at Denver	W 76–72	Max Morris (19)		10–12
23	December 29	Waterloo	W 94–92	Bob Brannum (31)		11–12

January

Game	Date	Team	Score	High points	Location Attendance	Record
24	January 1	Indianapolis	L 75–89	Max Morris (13)		11–13
25	January 3	at Waterloo	W 73–69	Milt Schoon (17)		12–13
26	January 5	Minneapolis	W 85–82	Max Morris (23)		13–13
27	January 7	at Tri-Cities	L 86–98	Bobby Cook (18)		13–14
28	January 8	at Fort Wayne	L 69–83	Max Morris (13)		13–15
29	January 9	at Anderson	L 89–112	Bobby Cook (21)		13–16
30	January 10	at Indianapolis	L 77–107	Walt Lautenbach (15)		13–17
31	January 12	Denver	W 115–92	Bobby Cook (44)		14–17
32	January 14	Denver	L 80–94	Jack Burmaster (26)		14–18
33	January 15	Anderson	W 81–76	Bobby Cook (23)		15–18
34	January 16	vs. Philadelphia	L 72–89	Jack Burmaster (16)		15–19
35	January 18	Fort Wayne	L 72–73	Max Morris (14)		15–20
36	January 21	at Washington	W 88–82	Bob Brannum (29)		16–20
37	January 22	vs. Baltimore	L 69–76	Max Morris (19)		16–21
38	January 24	vs. New York	L 68–101	Bobby Cook (14)		16–22
39	January 29	at Syracuse	L 70–85	Max Morris (14)		16–23
40	January 30	at Anderson	L 74–91	Bob Brannum (15)		16–24

February

Game	Date	Team	Score	High points	Location Attendance	Record
41	February 2	Washington	W 68–65	Bobby Cook (15)		17–24
42	February 5	at Tri-Cities	L 71–86	Jack Burmaster (19)		17–25
43	February 8	at Syracuse	L 81–106	Chips Sobek (19)		17–26
44	February 9	Tri-Cities	W 104–82	Max Morris (30)		18–26
45	February 11	at Denver	L 78–108	Noble Jorgensen (17)		18–27
46	February 13	at Denver	L 67–79	Noble Jorgensen (15)		18–28
47	February 15	Philadelphia	L 61–66	Max Morris (13)		18–29
48	February 19	at St. Louis	L 65–72	Jack Burmaster (18)		18–30
49	February 21	at Indianapolis	W 83–78	Bob Brannum (19)		19–30
50	February 23	Waterloo	L 81–86	Bob Brannum (21)		19–31
51	February 25	at Tri-Cities	L 66–74	Brannum, Patrick (15)		19–32
52	February 26	Indianapolis	L 86–107	Max Morris (26)		19–33

March

Game	Date	Team	Score	High points	Location Attendance	Record
53	March 2	Syracuse	W 95–85	Noble Jorgensen (18)		20–33
54	March 5	Indianapolis	L 87–92	Noble Jorgensen (21)		20–34
55	March 7	at Minneapolis	L 73–90	Noble Jorgensen (23)		20–35
56	March 9	Denver	W 115–92	Jack Burmaster (26)		21–35
57	March 10	Denver	W 141–104	Bob Brannum (41)		22–35
58	March 11	at Tri-Cities	L 79–97	Dick Schulz (16)		22–36
59	March 13	at Anderson	L 86–98	Brannum, Schoon, Sobek (14)		22–37
60	March 15	at Waterloo	L 69–87	Chips Sobek (15)		22–38
61	March 16	Syracuse	L 75–88	Noble Jorgensen (26)		22–39
62	March 18	at Chicago	L 63–66	Noble Jorgensen (17)		22–40

== NBA Playoffs ==
=== NBA Western Division Semifinals ===
(1) Indianapolis Olympians vs. (4) Sheboygan Red Skins: Olympians win series 2-1

- Game 1 @ Indianapolis (March 21): Indianapolis 86, Sheboygan 85
- Game 2 @ Sheboygan (March 23): Sheboygan 95, Indianapolis 85
- Game 3 @ Indianapolis (March 25): Indianapolis 91, Sheboygan 84

This was the first and only playoff meeting between the Olympians and Red Skins.
