= 1949–50 Denver Nuggets season =

- Head coach: Jimmy Darden
- Arena: Denver Arena Auditorium

Results
- Record: 11–51 (.177)
- Place: Division: 6th (Western)
- Playoff finish: Did not qualify
- Stats at Basketball Reference
- Radio: KOA

The 1949–50 Denver Nuggets season was the only season for the original Denver Nuggets franchise in the National Basketball Association and their 17th overall season of play when including their sixteen previous seasons of play as a team in the Amateur Athletic Union going back to 1932, as well as their second professional basketball season when you include their previous season that they played in the preceding National Basketball League. During their only season in the NBA, the original Nuggets franchise faced plenty of challenges due to the fact that airplanes were not yet seen as a common way to travel to long distances at a time and that trains were considered the way to travel from one destination to another at the time. Not only that, but some of the bigger markets like New York City, Boston, and Philadelphia saw the city of Denver as something more akin to the smaller cities of Anderson, Indiana, Sheboygan, Wisconsin, or Waterloo, Iowa as awkward locations to play under due to how far away Denver was when compared to the rest of the league's locations at the time. This would eventually lead to the original Nuggets ending their only season in the NBA with an 11–51 record (including a record-low (at the time) 0–15 start to their season, being the worst start to an NBA season ever before the 1970–71 Cleveland Cavaliers and 1972–73 Philadelphia 76ers first tied that record and then the 1988–89 Miami Heat and 1994–95 Los Angeles Clippers ended up breaking that record), as well as resort to them joining the Anderson Packers (who previously withdrew from the NBA themselves two weeks before the Nuggets did), Sheboygan Red Skins, and Waterloo Hawks in their departure from the NBA one day before the 1950 NBA draft was set to begin on April 24, 1950 in order to create what ultimately became the short-lived rivaling National Professional Basketball League as a failed effort to survive beyond the NBA, with the Nuggets first becoming the Denver Frontier Refiners and then the Evansville Agogans during that short-lived failure of a season.

Denver would not see a new professional basketball team until the American Basketball Association saw the Denver Rockets come to fruition as an inaugural team there following a failed creation of an ABA team in Kansas City, Missouri and troubled early starts with finding a team name for them after the initial "Denver Larks" and "Denver Lark Buntings" got canned by an eleventh hour ownership change to help save the franchise early on. Despite those early troubles, however, the Rockets proved to be one of the stronger ABA franchises around before later changing their team name in 1974 to the Denver Nuggets, partially as a tribute to the same Nuggets team that previously played in the NBL and NBA (despite not taking their previous history in the NBA in the process), but also because the Denver Rockets wanted to avoid any team name issues with the Houston Rockets franchise that the NBA had created around the same time once an impending ABA-NBA merger occurred, which eventually did happen in 1976. The new Nuggets franchise still operate under that team name to this day, having recently won the NBA Finals in 2023.

== Draft picks ==
The original Denver Nuggets franchise would participate in the 1949 NBL draft, which occurred months before the National Basketball League and the rivaling Basketball Association of America would merge operations to become the present-day National Basketball Association. However, as of 2026, no records of what the original Nuggets' draft picks were for the NBL have properly come up, with any information on who those final selections might have been being lost to time in the process.

== Roster ==
1949–50 Denver Nuggets roster
Players

Pos.	No.	Player	Height	Weight	DOB	From
F	22	Edward Bartels	6 ft 5 in (1.96 m)	195 lb (88 kg)		NC State
F	20	Bob Brown	6 ft 4 in (1.93 m)	205 lb (93 kg)		Miami (OH)
C	29−30	Jim Browne	6 ft 10 in (2.08 m)	235 lb (107 kg)		Tilden HS (Chicago)
F/C		Jake Carter	6 ft 4 in (1.93 m)	195 lb (88 kg)		East Texas A&M
F/C	28	Jack Cotton	6 ft 7 in (2.01 m)	200 lb (91 kg)		Wyoming
G/F	30	Dillard Crocker	6 ft 4 in (1.93 m)	205 lb (93 kg)		Western Michigan
G	25	Jimmy Darden	6 ft 1 in (1.85 m)	170 lb (77 kg)		Denver
F	31	Earl Dodd	6 ft 5 in (1.96 m)	175 lb (79 kg)		Truman State
G/F	21	Al Guokas	6 ft 5 in (1.96 m)	200 lb (91 kg)		Saint Joseph's
G		Bill Herman	6 ft 3 in (1.91 m)	170 lb (77 kg)		Mount Union
G	24	Duane Klueh	6 ft 3 in (1.91 m)	175 lb (79 kg)		Indiana State
G	23	Bob Royer	5 ft 10 in (1.78 m)	155 lb (70 kg)		Indiana State
G	27	Ken Sailors	5 ft 10 in (1.78 m)	175 lb (79 kg)		Wyoming
F/C	29	John Toomay	6 ft 6 in (1.98 m)	215 lb (98 kg)		Pacific
F/C	29	Floyd Volker	6 ft 4 in (1.93 m)	205 lb (93 kg)		Wyoming

Coaches
Head coach
- Jimmy Darden

Legend
- (DP) Unsigned draft pick
- (FA) Free agent
- (S) Suspended
- Injured

== Regular season ==
On October 29, the Nuggets lost to the Tri-Cities Blackhawks (now known as the Atlanta Hawks) at the Wharton Field House in Moline, Illinois in the first ever NBA game following the NBL–BAA merger on August 3.

=== Season standings ===
Western Division	W	L	PCT	GB	Home	Road	Neutral	Div
x-Indianapolis Olympians	39	25	.609	–	24–7	12–16	3–2	26–9
x-Anderson Packers	37	27	.578	2	22–9	12–18	3–0	25–12
x-Tri-Cities Blackhawks	29	35	.453	10	20–13	6–20	3–2	20–17
x-Sheboygan Red Skins	22	40	.355	17	17–14	5–22	0–4	15–20
Waterloo Hawks	19	43	.306	20	16–15	2–22	1–6	13–22
Denver Nuggets	11	51	.177	28	9–16	1–25	1–10	8–27

=== Game log ===
1949–50 Game log
#	Date	Opponent	Score	High points	Record
1	October 29	at Tri-Cities	85–93	Bob Brown (16)	0–1
2	November 1	at Indianapolis	64–71	Duane Klueh (15)	0–2
3	November 3	at Syracuse	58–78	Jack Toomay (16)	0–3
4	November 4	vs Syracuse	51–84	Bob Royer (13)	0–4
5	November 9	at Waterloo	65–80	Bob Brown (23)	0–5
6	November 10	vs Chicago	53–64	Al Guokas (15)	0–6
7	November 12	vs Philadelphia	63–81	Ken Sailors (15)	0–7
8	November 13	at Fort Wayne	71–90	Bob Brown (15)	0–8
9	November 16	at Washington	90–99	Ken Sailors (26)	0–9
10	November 17	at Baltimore	71–86	Ken Sailors (20)	0–10
11	November 18	vs New York	78–85	Ken Sailors (25)	0–11
12	November 19	at Rochester	64–96	Dillard Crocker (23)	0–12
13	November 20	at Syracuse	76–102	Jack Toomay (18)	0–13
14	November 21	at Syracuse	67–77	Dillard Crocker (26)	0–14
15	November 25	Minneapolis	81–101	Ken Sailors (29)	0–15
16	November 27	Baltimore	68–61	Dillard Crocker (24)	1–15
17	November 29	Philadelphia	56–57	Al Guokas (12)	1–16
18	December 2	Waterloo	74–63	Ken Sailors (25)	2–16
19	December 4	Waterloo	86–76	Ken Sailors (26)	3–16
20	December 7	St. Louis	72–76	Ken Sailors (30)	3–17
21	December 9	at Indianapolis	75–78	Jimmy Darden (19)	3–18
22	December 10	vs Minneapolis	76–89	Bob Brown (18)	3–19
23	December 11	at Tri-Cities	66–98	Ken Sailors (15)	3–20
24	December 13	Rochester	65–81	Ken Sailors (16)	3–21
25	December 16	Indianapolis	79–81	Jimmy Darden (16)	3–22
26	December 18	Indianapolis	79–83	Bob Brown (21)	3–23
27	December 23	New York	72–83	Ken Sailors (21)	3–24
28	December 25	Sheboygan	72–76	Ken Sailors (16)	3–25
29	December 30	Tri-Cities	83–85	Ken Sailors (19)	3–26
30	January 1	Chicago	78–92	Bob Brown (17)	3–27
31	January 4	Anderson	86–82	Ken Sailors (24)	4–27
32	January 5	Anderson	76–69	Toomay, Volker (18)	5–27
33	January 10	Boston	84–97	Duane Klueh (20)	5–28
34	January 12	at Sheboygan	92–115	Floyd Volker (24)	5–29
35	January 14	at Sheboygan	94–80	Dillard Crocker (28)	6–29
36	January 15	at St. Louis	83–89	Ken Sailors (15)	6–30
37	January 16	at Anderson	83–95	Ken Sailors (24)	6–31
38	January 17	at Indianapolis	81–101	Bob Brown (21)	6–32
39	January 19	at Syracuse	86–107	Bob Brown (21)	6–33
40	January 21	at Waterloo	84–88	Bob Brown (22)	6–34
41	January 22	at Tri-Cities	97–111	Duane Klueh (26)	6–35
42	January 25	at Waterloo	83–104	Dillard Crocker (18)	6–36
43	January 26	at Anderson	75–109	Jack Toomay (18)	6–37
44	January 31	Washington	78–88	Ken Sailors (20)	6–38
45	February 7	Fort Wayne	67–83	Ken Sailors (21)	6–39
46	February 11	Sheboygan	108–78	Dillard Crocker (32)	7–39
47	February 13	Sheboygan	79–67	Ken Sailors (27)	8–39
48	February 14	vs Boston	84–78	Ken Sailors (29)	9–39
49	February 16	Anderson	86–95	Dillard Crocker (26)	9–40
50	February 19	Anderson	86–85	Ken Sailors (31)	10–40
51	February 21	Syracuse	89–78	Ken Sailors (33)	11–40
52	February 23	Syracuse	80–108	Ken Sailors (24)	11–41
53	February 26	Waterloo	76–100	Dillard Crocker (26)	11–42
54	February 27	vs Tri-Cities	75–110	Dillard Crocker (19)	11–43
55	March 1	vs Tri-Cities	80–97	Dillard Crocker (27)	11–44
56	March 2	at Anderson	72–85	Brown, Sailors (19)	11–45
57	March 5	at Tri-Cities	80–91	Dillard Crocker (21)	11–46
58	March 8	at Waterloo	68–97	Jack Toomay (18)	11–47
59	March 9	at Sheboygan	92–115	Jack Toomay (21)	11–48
60	March 10	at Sheboygan	104–141	Jack Toomay (23)	11–49
61	March 16	vs Indianapolis	99–111	Jack Toomay (21)	11–50
62	March 18	vs Indianapolis	73–110	Dillard Crocker (18)	11–51
