= Danny Wagner =

American basketball player

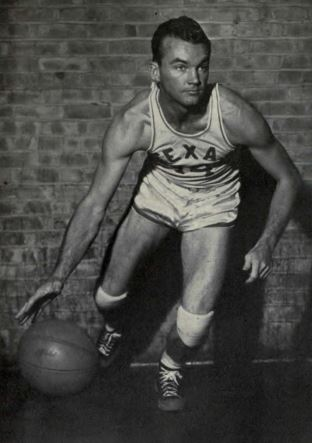
- Wagner from the 1947 Cactus

Personal information
- Born: August 1, 1922 Henryetta, Oklahoma, U.S.
- Died: December 27, 1997 (aged 75)
- Listed height: 6 ft 0 in (1.83 m)
- Listed weight: 170 lb (77 kg)

Career information
- College: Schreiner (1941–1942); Texas (1946–1947)
- BAA draft: 1947: undrafted
- Playing career: 1947–1950
- Position: Guard
- Number: 5

Career history
- 1947–1948: Flint Dow A.C.'s
- 1948–1950: Sheboygan Red Skins

Career NBA statistics
- Points: 69 (6.3 ppg)
- Assists: 18 (1.6 apg)
- Personal fouls: 22 (2.0 pfpg)
- Stats at NBA.com
- Stats at Basketball Reference

Daniel Earnest Wagner Jr. (August 1, 1922 – December 27, 1997) was an American professional basketball player. He played in the National Basketball Association (NBA) for the Sheboygan Red Skins during the 1949–50 NBA season. Wagner also played in the National Basketball League for the Flint Dow A.C.'s during the 1947–1948 season. He played college basketball for the Schreiner Mountaineers and the Texas Longhorns.

== Basketball career ==
=== College ===
He played during his college days with the Schreiner Mountaineers during their 1941–42 season. He took a break from college for several years, during which he served with the United States Navy. He then joined the Texas Longhorns for their 1946–47 season, with teammates including Slater Martin and John Hargis. This trio were the first players from University of Texas at Austin to play in the BAA or the NBA.

== Career statistics ==
Legend
GP	Games played	GS	Games started	MPG	Minutes per game
FG%	Field goal percentage	3P%	3-point field goal percentage	FT%	Free throw percentage
RPG	Rebounds per game	APG	Assists per game	SPG	Steals per game
BPG	Blocks per game	PPG	Points per game	**Bold**	Career high

=== NBA ===
==== Regular season ====
Year	Team	GP	FG%	FT%	APG	PPG
1949–50	Sheboygan	11	.352	.886	1.6	6.3
