= Tex Ritter (basketball) =

American basketball player (1924–2004)

Personal information
- Born: February 26, 1924 Richmond, Kentucky, U.S.
- Died: October 15, 2004 (aged 80) Letcher, Kentucky, U.S.
- Listed height: 6 ft 2 in (1.88 m)
- Listed weight: 185 lb (84 kg)

Career information
- High school: Madison (Richmond, Kentucky)
- College: Eastern Kentucky (1944–1948)
- NBA draft: 1948: -- round, --
- Drafted by: New York Knicks
- Playing career: 1948–1951
- Position: Shooting guard / small forward
- Number: 23

Career history
- 1948–1951: New York Knicks

Career BAA/NBA statistics
- Points: 911 (6.0 ppg)
- Rebounds: 65 (1.9 rpg)
- Assists: 145 (1.0 apg)
- Stats at NBA.com
- Stats at Basketball Reference

Goebel Franklin "Tex" Ritter (February 26, 1924 – October 15, 2004) was an American professional basketball player. Ritter was selected in the 1948 BAA Draft by the New York Knicks after a collegiate career at Eastern Kentucky. He played for the Knicks for three seasons before retiring from basketball.

== BAA/NBA career statistics ==
Legend
GP	Games played	FG%	Field-goal percentage
FT%	Free-throw percentage	RPG	Rebounds per game
APG	Assists per game	PPG	Points per game
**Bold**	Career high

=== Regular season ===
Year	Team	GP	FG%	FT%	RPG	APG	PPG
1948–49	New York	55	.348	.623	–	1.0	**6.1**
1949–50	New York	**62**	.337	**.710**	–	.8	5.2
1950–51	New York	34	**.379**	.690	**1.9**	**1.1**	3.7
Career		151	.348	.674	1.9	1.0	5.2

=== Playoffs ===
Year	Team	GP	FG%	FT%	RPG	APG	PPG
1949	New York	**5**	**.303**	.550	–	.4	6.2
1950	New York	**5**	**.303**	.893	–	**1.6**	**9.0**
1951	New York	3	.200	**1.000**	**.7**	.0	1.0
Career		13	.296	.755	.7	.8	6.1
