= John Pritchard (basketball) =

American basketball player

Personal information
- Born: January 23, 1927 Minneapolis, Minnesota, U.S.
- Died: August 3, 2012 (aged 85) Fridley, Minnesota, U.S.
- Listed height: 6 ft 9 in (2.06 m)
- Listed weight: 220 lb (100 kg)

Career information
- High school: South (Minneapolis, Minnesota)
- College: Drake (1945–1949)
- BAA draft: 1949: 7th round, --
- Drafted by: St. Louis Bombers
- Playing career: 1949–19??
- Position: Center
- Number: 11

Career history
- 1949: Waterloo Hawks
- 1950–195?: Washington Generals

Career NBA statistics
- Points: 22 (3.1 ppg)
- Assists: 8 (1.1 apg)
- Stats at NBA.com
- Stats at Basketball Reference

John David Pritchard (January 23, 1927 – August 3, 2012) was an American professional basketball player. Pritchard was selected in the seventh round of the 1949 BAA Draft by the St. Louis Bombers after a collegiate career at Drake. He played for the Waterloo Hawks for seven total games in 1949. He then spent time playing for the Washington Generals, the traveling exhibition team who always play, and lose to, the Harlem Globetrotters.

== Career statistics ==
Legend
GP	Games played	GS	Games started	MPG	Minutes per game
FG%	Field goal percentage	3P%	3-point field goal percentage	FT%	Free throw percentage
RPG	Rebounds per game	APG	Assists per game	SPG	Steals per game
BPG	Blocks per game	PPG	Points per game	**Bold**	Career high

=== NBA ===
==== Regular season ====
Year	Team	GP	FG%	FT%	APG	PPG
1949–50	Waterloo	7	.310	.364	1.1	3.1
