= Harry Donovan =

American basketball player (1926–2025)

Personal information
- Born: September 10, 1926 Union City, New Jersey, U.S.
- Died: January 20, 2025 (aged 98)
- Listed height: 6 ft 2 in (1.88 m)
- Listed weight: 180 lb (82 kg)

Career information
- High school: Union Hill (Union Hill, New Jersey)
- College: Muhlenberg (1945–1949)
- BAA draft: 1949: 2nd round, –
- Drafted by: New York Knicks
- Playing career: 1949–1953
- Position: Guard
- Number: 16

Career history
- 1949–1950: New York Knicks
- 1950: Allentown Aces
- 1950–1951: Wilkes-Barre Barons
- 1951–1953: Lancaster Rockets

Career highlights
- 2× All-EPBL Second Team (1952, 1953)

Career NBA statistics
- Points: 253 (5.6 ppg)
- Assists: 38 (0.8 apg)
- Stats at NBA.com
- Stats at Basketball Reference

Henry Hunter Donovan (September 10, 1926 – January 20, 2025) was an American professional basketball player. He was selected in the second round in the 1949 BAA draft by the New York Knicks. Donovan played for the Knicks in 1949–50, then spent two seasons playing in the American Basketball League. He was a two-time all-league selection while he played for the Lancaster Rockets of the Eastern Professional Basketball League (EPBL) from 1951 to 1953. Donovan died on January 20, 2025, at the age of 98.

== Career statistics ==
Legend
GP	Games played	GS	Games started	MPG	Minutes per game
FG%	Field goal percentage	3P%	3-point field goal percentage	FT%	Free throw percentage
RPG	Rebounds per game	APG	Assists per game	SPG	Steals per game
BPG	Blocks per game	PPG	Points per game	**Bold**	Career high

=== NBA ===
==== Regular season ====
Year	Team	GP	FG%	FT%	APG	PPG
1949–50	New York	45	.327	.689	.8	5.6

==== Playoffs ====
Year	Team	GP	FG%	FT%	APG	PPG
1950	New York	3	.000	1.000	.0	.7
