= Jack Underman =

American basketball player

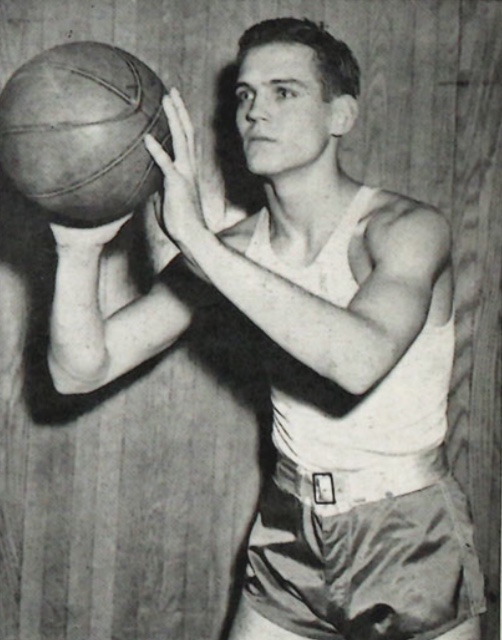
- Underman from the 1946 Makio

Personal information
- Born: August 17, 1925 Elyria, Ohio U.S.
- Died: October 23, 1969 (aged 44) Elyria, Ohio, U.S.
- Listed height: 6 ft 6 in (1.98 m)

Career information
- High school: West (Columbus, Ohio)
- College: Capital (1943–1944); Ohio State (1945–1947)
- BAA draft: 1947: 1st round, 7th overall pick
- Drafted by: St. Louis Bombers
- Position: Center

Career highlights
- 2× All-Big Nine (1946, 1947)
- Stats at Basketball Reference

John O. Underman (August 17, 1925 – October 23, 1969) was an American basketball player. Underman was selected in the 1947 BAA draft by the St. Louis Bombers after a collegiate career at Ohio State (OSU), although he never played professionally. Underman went to West High School in Columbus. He started his collegiate career at Capital University during the 1943–44 season. Underman transferred to Ohio State and sat out the 1944–45 season. He led the Big Nine Conference in scoring as a junior in 1945–46, the same season the Buckeyes made the NCAA Final Four and won the Third Place game.

Underman then became an oral surgeon. He died in a car crash on October 23, 1969, at age 44.
