= Jack Burmaster =

American basketball player and coach

- The Illio, 1948

Personal information
- Born: December 23, 1926 Elgin, Illinois, US
- Died: September 27, 2005 (aged 78) Glenview, Illinois, US
- Listed height: 6 ft 3 in (1.91 m)
- Listed weight: 190 lb (86 kg)

Career information
- High school: Elgin (Elgin, Illinois)
- College: Illinois (1944–1948)
- NBA draft: 1948: 2nd round, 19th overall pick
- Drafted by: St. Louis Bombers
- Playing career: 1948–1950
- Position: Guard
- Number: 5, 10

Career history
- 1948–1949: Oshkosh All-Stars
- 1949–1950: Sheboygan Red Skins

Career NBA statistics
- Points: 598 (9.8 ppg)
- Assists: 179 (2.9 apg)
- Games played: 61
- Stats at NBA.com
- Stats at Basketball Reference

John Hagelou "Jack" Burmaster (December 23, 1926 – September 28, 2005) was an American basketball player and coach.

He played collegiately for the University of Illinois at Urbana-Champaign. While at Illinois, Burmaster played the 1945 season with two notable future coaches, Johnny Orr and Vic Bubas.

He was selected by the St. Louis Bombers in the 1948 BAA Draft.

Burmaster, at 6-foot-3 and 190 pounds, began his professional career with the Oshkosh All-Stars of the National Basketball League during the 1948–49 season. He scored 360 points, fifth best on the team, in playing all 64 games for the All-Stars, who won the Western Division championship with a 37–27 record, one game ahead of the Tri-Cities Blackhawks and two ahead of the Sheboygan Red Skins. The All-Stars were defeated by the Anderson Packers in the NBL finals.

When Oshkosh folded soon after the NBL merged with the Basketball Association of America in 1949, he joined Sheboygan of the newly minted NBA. Burmaster became one of Sheboygan's best all-around players. Tenacious on defense, he was equally tough on offense, averaging 9.8 points per game (598 points in 61 games). He was the Red Skins' fourth-leading scorer.

In 1950–51, after Sheboygan was kicked out of the NBA, Burmaster continued to star for the Red Skins of the National Professional Basketball League, scoring 467 points in 42 games, an average of 11.1 points per game. He was named to the NPBL's second team and Sheboygan finished with the league's best record at 29–16.

Burmaster was head basketball coach at duPont Manual High School in Louisville, Kentucky for one season, 1951–52, finishing runner-up in the state championship to Cuba High School.

From 1952 to 1975, Burmaster was head basketball coach at Evanston Township High School in Evanston, Illinois, where his record of 362–145 included the 1968 Illinois state high school championship. He served as athletic director at the school from 1975 to 1985.

In 2006, Burmaster was voted as one of the 100 Legends of the IHSA Boys Basketball Tournament, a group of former players and coaches in honor of the 100 anniversary of the IHSA boys basketball tournament.

== Honors ==
=== Basketball ===
- 1946 – 2nd team All-Big Ten
- 1946 – Honorable Mention All-American
- 1948 – Team Captain
- 1948 – 2nd team All-Big Ten
- 1948 – Team Most Valuable Player
- 1948 – Honorable Mention All-American
- 1973 – Inducted into the Illinois Basketball Coaches Association's Hall of Fame as a player.
- 2007 – Named one of the 100 Legends of the IHSA Boys Basketball Tournament.

== Statistics ==
=== College ===
Season	Games	Points	PPG	Big Ten Record	Overall Record	Highlight
1944–45	16	152	9.5	7–5	13–7	-
1945–46	20	173	8.65	7–5	14–7	Honorable Mention All-American
1946–47	15	34	2.27	8–4	14–6	-
1947–48	18	178	9.9	5–5	15–5	Honorable Mention All-American; Team Most Valuable Player
**Totals**	**69**	**537**	**7.8**	**29–19**	**56–25**	

=== NBA career statistics ===
Legend
GP	Games played	MPG	Minutes per game
FG%	Field-goal percentage	FT%	Free-throw percentage
RPG	Rebounds per game	APG	Assists per game
PPG	Points per game	**Bold**	Career high

†	Denotes season in which Kerr won an NBA championship
*	Led the league

==== Regular season ====
Year	Team	GP	MPG	FG%	FT%	RPG	APG	PPG
1949–50	Sheboygan	61	–	.333	.681	–	2.9	9.8

==== Playoffs ====
Year	Team	GP	MPG	FG%	FT%	RPG	APG	PPG
1949–50	Sheboygan	3	–	.516	1.000	–	2.7	12.0
