= Max Morris =

American basketball and football player (1925–1998)

Profile
- Position: End

Personal information
- Born: March 13, 1925; Norris City, Illinois, U.S.
- Died: January 8, 1998 (aged 72)

Career information
- College: Northwestern
- NFL draft: 1947: 26th round, 245th overall pick

Career history
- 1946–1947: Chicago Rockets
- 1948: Brooklyn Dodgers

Awards and highlights
- Consensus All-American (1945); First-team All-Big Ten (1945)
- Stats at Pro Football Reference

Other information
- Basketball career

Personal information
- Listed height: 6 ft 2 in (1.88 m)
- Listed weight: 195 lb (88 kg)

Career information
- High school: Frankfort (West Frankfort, Illinois)
- College: Northwestern (1943–1946)
- Playing career: 1946–1950
- Position: Power forward / center
- Number: 11

Career history
- 1946–1947: Chicago American Gears
- 1947–1950: Sheboygan Red Skins

Career highlights
- NBL champion (1947); Consensus first-team All-American (1946); Consensus second-team All-American (1945)

Career NBA statistics
- Points: 781
- Free throws: 277
- Assists: 194
- Stats at NBA.com
- Stats at Basketball Reference

Glen Max Morris (March 13, 1925 – January 8, 1998) was an American professional basketball and American football player. He was a consensus All-American in both sports for Northwestern University and later played professional football for the Chicago Rockets and Brooklyn Dodgers of the All-America Football Conference. He also played in the NBA for the Sheboygan Red Skins.

== Biography ==
Morris was born in Norris City, Illinois and attended Frankfort Community High School in West Frankfort, Illinois where the high school gymnasium is named after Morris. He later attended the University of Illinois and Northwestern University.

Morris was the last Northwestern athlete to be selected as a first-team All-American in two sports. He was a consensus All-American football player at the end position in 1945. That year, Morris set a Big Ten Conference single-game record with 158 receiving yards in a game against Minnesota.

Morris was also selected as a consensus All-American basketball player at the forward position in 1946. He won the Big Ten Conference basketball individual scoring championship in both 1945 and 1946.

After graduating from Northwestern, Morris played three seasons of professional football in the All-America Football Conference for the Chicago Rockets (1946–1947) and Brooklyn Dodgers (1948). He played in a total of 39 professional football games and had 53 receptions for 677 yards.

Besides playing professional football, Morris played four seasons of professional basketball in the NBL and NBA with the Chicago American Gears and the Sheboygan Red Skins.

In 1984, Morris was a charter inductee into the Northwestern Athletics Hall of Fame.

In 1985, the gymnasium at Frankfort Community High School, Morris' alma mater, was named in his honor.

== Career statistics ==
Legend
GP	Games played	GS	Games started	MPG	Minutes per game
FG%	Field goal percentage	3P%	3-point field goal percentage	FT%	Free throw percentage
RPG	Rebounds per game	APG	Assists per game	SPG	Steals per game
BPG	Blocks per game	PPG	Points per game	**Bold**	Career high

=== NBA ===
==== Regular season ====
Year	Team	GP	FG%	FT%	APG	PPG
1949–50	Sheboygan	63	.363	.667	3.1	12.6

==== Playoffs ====
Year	Team	GP	FG%	FT%	APG	PPG
1950	Sheboygan	3	.350	.577	4.7	14.3

== See also ==
- 1945 College Football All-America Team
- 1946 NCAA Men's Basketball All-Americans
