= John Chaney (basketball, born 1920) =

American basketball player (1920–2004)

Personal information
- Born: February 29, 1920 Zachary, Louisiana, U.S.
- Died: August 9, 2004 (aged 84) Baton Rouge, Louisiana, U.S.
- Listed height: 6 ft 3 in (1.91 m)
- Listed weight: 185 lb (84 kg)

Career information
- High school: Zachary (Zachary, Louisiana)
- College: LSU (1940–1943)
- Playing career: 1946–1950
- Position: Power forward / center
- Number: 13, 4

Career history

Playing
- 1946–1949: Syracuse Nationals
- 1949: Tri-Cities Blackhawks
- 1949–1950: Sheboygan Red Skins

Coaching
- 1951–19??: LSU (assistant)

Career highlights
- First-team All-SEC (1943)
- Stats at NBA.com
- Stats at Basketball Reference

John Louie Chaney (February 29, 1920 – August 9, 2004) was an American basketball player and coach. He played college basketball for the LSU Tigers. Upon graduation, John suited up in the National Basketball League and National Basketball Association (NBA). His teams included the Syracuse Nationals, Tri-Cities Blackhawks and Sheboygan Red Skins.

Following his basketball playing career, Chaney became a men's basketball assistant coach at LSU. He played a significant role in the Tigers' 1953 first-ever NCAA Final Four appearance, SEC championship, and 1954 SEC co-championship.

== Career statistics ==
Legend
GP	Games played	GS	Games started	MPG	Minutes per game
FG%	Field goal percentage	3P%	3-point field goal percentage	FT%	Free throw percentage
RPG	Rebounds per game	APG	Assists per game	SPG	Steals per game
BPG	Blocks per game	PPG	Points per game	**Bold**	Career high

=== NBA ===
==== Regular season ====
Year	Team	GP	FG%	FT%	APG	PPG
1949–50	Tri-Cities	6	.270	.667	**2.5**	**4.7**
1949–50	Sheboygan	**10**	**.306**	**.706**	.5	4.2
Career		16	.291	.690	1.3	4.4
