= 1947 BAA draft =

Basketball player selection

General information
- Sport: Basketball
- Date: June 2, 1947
- Location: The Leland Hotel (Detroit, Michigan)

Overview
- 80 total selections in 10 rounds
- League: BAA
- First selection: Clifton McNeely, Pittsburgh Ironmen
- Hall of Famers: 4: F Harry Gallatin; G Andy Phillip; F Jim Pollard; G Carl Braun

The 1947 BAA draft was the first ever draft of the Basketball Association of America (BAA), which later merged with the National Basketball League (NBL) to become the National Basketball Association (NBA). The fledgling BAA held this draft as a joint draft with the established NBL. The BAA first discussed the idea of creating a draft system similar to the NFL draft (which was first implemented back in 1936) back in January 1947 during league meetings held in New York, with each team being given territorial pick rights to one player each year from schools in a 50-mile radius. However, both leagues wanted to control salaries by stamping out competitive bidding between the two leagues from college players that may or may not have been returning home from World War II by assigning exclusive rights to the team selecting a player. Before the BAA's draft began, the NBL had already signed eleven players that had already graduated from college, all of whom the NBL did not feel like they should be exposed to the BAA's draft system on display. The players in question included college stars Jack Smiley and Ralph Hamilton going to the Fort Wayne Zollner Pistons works team, Harry Boykoff going to the Toledo Jeeps, and John Hargis, Frank Brian, and Charlie Black going to the Anderson Duffey Packers works team. As a trade-off, the BAA teams were allowed to select players early on before the NBL did. Including the NBL's draft side of things (which saw at least ten teams of their own participate in the event themselves), the overall draft program would have included 100 players (mainly college seniors) drafted between the two leagues.

The draft was held on June 2, 1947, months before the 1947–48 season began. During this draft, the nine remaining BAA teams (both the Cleveland Rebels and Detroit Falcons decided to decline their entries into the draft while still remaining as existing franchises at the time) along with the Baltimore Bullets, who joined the BAA from the American Basketball League after a dispute they had during the ABL playoffs with that league, took turns selecting amateur U.S. college basketball players. In the first round of the draft, the teams selected in reverse order of their win–loss record in the previous season, while the Bullets were assigned the tenth pick, the last pick of the first round, due in part to their overwhelming 31–3 record they had in the ABL beating out even the 49–11 record held by the Washington Capitols. Both the Pittsburgh Ironmen and Toronto Huskies participated in this draft, but they folded before the season opened alongside the Cleveland Rebels and Detroit Falcons.

== Draft selections and draftee career notes ==
Interestingly, this draft would allow for BAA teams to not just draft players that previously played in other professional basketball leagues (such as the rivaling National Basketball League, the (original) American Basketball League, and the short-lived Pacific Coast Professional Basketball League), but also select players that previously played in the inaugural BAA season beforehand as well. This led to some interesting draft results that would be out of place in more modern-day drafts otherwise, such as the selections of Hank Biasetti and Irv Rothenberg by the Boston Celtics and Washington Capitols at picks #13 and #56 despite them both previously playing in the BAA earlier on through the Toronto Huskies and Cleveland Rebels respectively (with the former team being notable for still being a part of the BAA properly at the time), as well as notable age gaps between certain prospects selected in this draft (notably among players like Chick Reiser, who had last attended college back in 1935 before being drafted by the original Baltimore Bullets near the end of the draft).

The first selection of the draft, Clifton McNeely from Texas Wesleyan University, did not play in the BAA. Instead, McNeely opted for a high school coaching career in Texas. The fourth pick, Walt Dropo, also did not play in the BAA and opted for a professional baseball career instead, eventually playing 13 seasons in the Major League Baseball (MLB). The 7th and 10th picks, Jack Underman and Larry Killick, also never played in the BAA. Three players from this draft, Harry Gallatin, Andy Phillip and Jim Pollard, have been inducted to the Basketball Hall of Fame.

Wataru Misaka, selected by the New York Knicks, made the team's final roster and became the first person of color to play in modern professional basketball, just months after the Major League Baseball color line had been broken by the Brooklyn Dodgers' Jackie Robinson. Misaka was cut after playing only three games with the team.

== Key ==
Pos.	G	F	C
Position	Guard	Forward	Center

^	Denotes player who has been inducted to the Naismith Memorial Basketball Hall of Fame
*	Denotes player who has been selected for at least one All-Star Game and All-NBA Team
^{+}	Denotes player who has been selected for at least one All-Star Game
^{#}	Denotes player who has never appeared in an NBA regular-season or playoff game
^{~}	Denotes player who has been selected as Rookie of the Year

== Draft ==
Rnd.	Pick	Player	Pos.	Nationality (Note: Nationality indicates the player's national team or representative nationality. If a player has not competed at the international level, then the nationality indicates the national team which the player is eligible to represent according to FIBA rules.)	Team	School / club team
1	1	Clifton McNeely^{#}	F	United States	Pittsburgh Ironmen	Texas Wesleyan
1	2	Glen Selbo	G/F	United States	Toronto Huskies	Wisconsin
1	3	Bulbs Ehlers	G/F	United States	Boston Celtics	Purdue
1	4	Walt Dropo^{#}	–	United States	Providence Steamrollers	Connecticut
1	5	Dick Holub	C	United States	New York Knicks	Long Island
1	6	Chink Crossin	G	United States	Philadelphia Warriors	Pennsylvania
1	7	Jack Underman^{#}	–	United States	St. Louis Bombers	Ohio State
1	8	Paul Huston	F	United States	Chicago Stags	Ohio State
1	9	Dick O'Keefe	G/F	United States	Washington Capitols	Santa Clara
1	10	Larry Killick^{#}	–	United States	Baltimore Bullets	Vermont

== Other picks ==
The following list includes other draft picks who have appeared in at least one BAA/NBA game.

Rnd.	Pick	Player	Pos.	Nationality	Team	School / club team
2	11	Fritz Nagy	G/F	United States	Pittsburgh Ironmen	Akron
2	12	Red Rocha^{+}	F/C	United States	Toronto Huskies	Oregon State
2	13	Hank Biasatti	G	Italy; Canada	Boston Celtics	Toronto Huskies (Basketball Association of America)
2	14	Bob Hubbard	F/C	United States	Providence Steamrollers	Springfield
2	18	Ben Schadler	F	United States	Chicago Stags	Northwestern
2	19	Jack Tingle	F	United States	Washington Capitols	Kentucky
3	23	Gene Stump	G/F	United States	Boston Celtics	DePaul
3	28	Jimmy Darden	G	United States	Chicago Stags	Denver
4	33	Johnny Ezersky	G/F	United States	Boston Celtics	Brooklyn Gothams (American Basketball League)
4	38	Gene Vance	G/F	United States	Chicago Stags	Illinois
4	40	Harry Gallatin^	F/C	United States	Baltimore Bullets	Northeast Missouri
5	42	Paul Hoffman^{~}	G/F	United States	Toronto Huskies	Purdue
5	43	Jack Hewson	F/C	United States	Boston Celtics	Philadelphia Sphas (American Basketball League)
5	45	Ron Livingstone	C	United States	New York Knicks	Wyoming
5	47	Andy Phillip^	G/F	United States	Chicago Stags	Illinois
5	48	Matt Zunic	G/F	United States	Washington Capitols	George Washington
6	53	Andy Duncan	F/C	United States	New York Knicks	William & Mary
6	54	Paul Napolitano	G/F	United States	St. Louis Bombers	San Francisco
6	56	Irv Rothenberg	C	United States	Washington Capitols	Cleveland Rebels (Basketball Association of America)
7	61	Wataru Misaka	G	United States	New York Knicks	Utah
7	62	Jim Pollard^	F/C	United States	Chicago Stags	Stanford
7	63	Saul Mariaschin	G	United States	Washington Capitols	Harvard
8	68	Don Smith	G/F	United States	Chicago Stags	Indianapolis Kautskys (National Basketball League)
8	69	Paul Cloyd	G/F	United States	Washington Capitols	Wisconsin
8	70	Elmer Gainer	F/C	United States	Baltimore Bullets	Anderson Duffey Packers (National Basketball League)
9	74	John Mandic	F/C	United States	Washington Capitols	Portland Indians (Pacific Coast Professional Basketball League)
9	75	Chick Reiser	G/F	United States	Baltimore Bullets	Fort Wayne Zollner Pistons (National Basketball League)

== Notable undrafted players ==
These players were not selected in the 1947 draft, but played at least one game in the BAA/NBA.

Player	Pos.	Nationality	School/club team
Don Barksdale^{+}	F/C	United States	UCLA
Charles B. Black	F/C	United States	Kansas
Jake Bornheimer	F/C	United States	Muhlenberg
Harry Boykoff	C	United States	St. John's
Carl Braun^	G	United States	Colgate
Fran Curran	G	United States	Notre Dame
Jack Dwan	F/G	United States	Loyola (IL)
Hoot Gibson	F/C	United States	Creighton
Ralph Hamilton	G/F	United States	Indiana
John Hargis	G/F	United States	Texas
Doug Holcomb	F	United States	Wisconsin
Boag Johnson	G	United States	Huntington
Walt Kirk	G	United States	Illinois
Bob Knight	G/F	United States	Weaver HS (Hartford, Connecticut)
Ray Kuka	F	United States	Montana State
Walt Lautenbach	G/F	United States	Wisconsin
Matt Mazza	G/F	United States	Michigan State
Dick Mehen	F/C	United States	Tennessee
Ken Menke	G	United States	Illinois
Fred Paine	F	United States	Westminster (PA)
Les Pugh	F/C	United States	Ohio State
Ray Ramsey	G/F	United States	Bradley
Lee Robbins	F	United States	Colorado
Gene Rock	G	United States	USC
Jack Rocker	F/C	United States	California
Jack Smiley	F/G	United States	Illinois
Jim Springer	C	United States	Canterbury
Sid Tanenbaum	G/F	United States	NYU
Mike Todorovich	F/C	United States	Wyoming
Jack Toomay	F/C	United States	Pacific
Floyd Volker	F/C	United States	Wyoming
Danny Wagner	G	United States	Texas

== See also ==
- List of first overall NBA draft picks
- NBA records
