= Stan Patrick =

American basketball player (1922–2000)

- The Illio, 1944

Personal information
- Born: May 5, 1922 Chicago, Illinois, U.S.
- Died: January 1, 2000 (aged 77) Belvidere, Illinois, U.S.
- Listed height: 6 ft 2 in (1.88 m)
- Listed weight: 185 lb (84 kg)

Career information
- High school: Leo (Chicago, Illinois)
- College: Santa Clara (1940–1943); Illinois (1943–1944)
- Playing career: 1944–1950
- Position: Small forward / shooting guard
- Number: 8

Career history

Playing
- 1944–1947: Chicago American Gears
- 1947–1948: Flint Dow A.C.'s
- 1948–1949: Hammond Calumet Buccaneers
- 1949–1950: Waterloo Hawks
- 1950: Sheboygan Red Skins
- 1950: Kansas City Hi-Spots

Coaching
- 1944–1945: De La Salle Institute
- 1951–1964: Belvidere HS

Career highlights
- NBL champion (1947); All-NBL First Team (1945); NBL Rookie of the Year (1945)

Career NBA statistics
- Points: 321
- Assists: 74
- Stats at NBA.com
- Stats at Basketball Reference

Stanley Augustus Patrick (May 5, 1922 – January 1, 2000) was an American National Basketball Association player.

Patrick played collegiate basketball at Santa Clara University before World War II. His roommate at Santa Clara was future Nevada Governor Paul Laxalt. After the advent of World War II, Patrick returned to the University of Illinois.

He played with the Waterloo Hawks and Sheboygan Red Skins during the 1949–50 NBA season.

Patrick had also played in the National Basketball League (NBL), and was named Rookie of the Year for the 1945–46 season.

== Career statistics ==
Legend
GP	Games played	GS	Games started	MPG	Minutes per game
FG%	Field goal percentage	3P%	3-point field goal percentage	FT%	Free throw percentage
RPG	Rebounds per game	APG	Assists per game	SPG	Steals per game
BPG	Blocks per game	PPG	Points per game	**Bold**	Career high

=== NBA ===
==== Regular season ====
Year	Team	GP	FG%	FT%	APG	PPG
1949–50	Waterloo	**34**	**.422**	**.648**	1.2	**6.7**
1949–50	Sheboygan	19	.346	.487	**1.7**	4.9
Career		53	.395	.605	1.4	6.1

==== Playoffs ====
Year	Team	GP	FG%	FT%	APG	PPG
1950	Sheboygan	3	.571	.667	.3	3.3
