= Bernie Mehen =

American basketball player

Personal information
- Born: September 19, 1918 Wheeling, West Virginia
- Died: May 11, 2007 (aged 88) Sylvania, Ohio
- Listed height: 6 ft 4 in (1.93 m)
- Listed weight: 185 lb (84 kg)

Career information
- High school: Wheeling Park (Wheeling, West Virginia)
- College: Tennessee (1939–1942)
- Position: Forward / center

Career history
- 1945–1946: Toledo Jim Whites
- 1946: Youngstown Bears
- 1946–1948: Toledo Jeeps

Bernard Joseph Mehen (September 19, 1918 – May 11, 2007) was an American professional basketball player. He played in the National Basketball League for the Youngstown Bears and Toledo Jeeps and averaged 6.9 points per game. He served in the Army during World War II and suffered a foot injury caused by mortar shell. Bernie's younger brother Dick Mehen played alongside him at both the University of Tennessee and with the Toledo Jeeps.
