= Bob Brannum =

American basketball player and coach

Personal information
- Born: May 28, 1925 Winfield, Kansas, U.S.
- Died: February 5, 2005 (aged 79) Marshfield, Massachusetts, U.S.
- Listed height: 6 ft 5 in (1.96 m)
- Listed weight: 215 lb (98 kg)

Career information
- High school: Winfield (Winfield, Kansas)
- College: Kentucky (1943–1944, 1946–1947); Michigan State (1947–1948)
- BAA draft: 1948: undrafted
- Playing career: 1948–1955
- Position: Power forward / center
- Number: 7, 18
- Coaching career: 1962–1986

Career history

Playing
- 1948–1950: Sheboygan Redskins
- 1951–1955: Boston Celtics

Coaching
- 1962–1968: Norwich
- 1968–1970: Kenyon
- 1970–1986: Brandeis

Career highlights
- Consensus first-team All-American (1944)

Career statistics
- Points: 2,455
- Rebounds: 1,944
- Assists: 699
- Stats at NBA.com
- Stats at Basketball Reference

Robert Warren Brannum (May 28, 1925 – February 5, 2005) was an American basketball player.

A 6'5" center from Winfield, Kansas, Brannum attended the University of Kentucky and Michigan State before playing professional basketball.

Brannum was named to the 1943 first team "All American" in his senior year at Winfield (Kansas) High School, and his twin brother Clarence was named to the second team at the same time.

Brannum spent his first three professional seasons with the Sheboygan Red Skins, whose pro roots dated from 1938, the second season of the National Basketball League. Brannum started all three seasons, during which Sheboygan played in three leagues: the NBL (1948–49), NBA (1949–50) and National Professional Basketball League (1950–51). He was one of the all-time great Redskins players, known for his hard-nosed play, rebounding prowess and scoring ability. In Brannum's final season with Sheboygan, when the Redskins finished with the NPBL's best record, he was selected first-team center after having the league's high scoring average (19.0 points per game). Brannum's 45-point barrage against the Kansas City Hi-Spots on December 28, 1950, was a franchise record, topping the 44 points Bobby Cook scored against the NBA's Denver Nuggets the previous January.

He spent the next four seasons with the Boston Celtics, with whom he earned a reputation as a hard-nosed, pugnacious player. Brannum often served as an unofficial "bodyguard" for smaller players on the team, especially point guard Bob Cousy. Cousy later remarked in an interview, "It was a great luxury to have Bob on the team, and to have him playing the role of protector. It definitely made my job a lot easier."

Brannum retired as a player in 1955. He later coached basketball at Norwich University, Kenyon College and Brandeis University, where he won a school-record 204 games. Brannum also was the long-time golf coach at Brandeis University. He died of pancreatic cancer in 2005.

Brannum was inducted posthumously into the Kansas Sports Hall of Fame in 2013.

== Career statistics ==
Legend
GP	Games played	GS	Games started	MPG	Minutes per game
FG%	Field goal percentage	3P%	3-point field goal percentage	FT%	Free throw percentage
RPG	Rebounds per game	APG	Assists per game	SPG	Steals per game
BPG	Blocks per game	PPG	Points per game	**Bold**	Career high

=== NBA ===
==== Regular season ====
Year	Team	GP	MPG	FG%	FT%	RPG	APG	PPG
1949–50	Sheboygan	59	–	.326	.690	–	**3.5**	**12.1**
1951–52	Boston	66*	20.1	.369	.626	6.2	1.2	6.1
1952–53	Boston	**71**	**26.8**	.348	.595	**7.6**	2.1	6.8
1953–54	Boston	**71**	24.4	.309	.626	7.2	2.0	5.8
1953–54	Boston	**71**	22.9	**.378**	**.709**	6.9	1.8	6.2
Career		338	23.6	.344	.652	7.0	2.1	7.3

==== Playoffs ====
Year	Team	GP	MPG	FG%	FT%	RPG	APG	PPG
1950	Sheboygan	3	–	.349	**.650**	–	**3.7**	**14.3**
1952	Boston	3	16.0	.333	.167	3.3	1.0	3.0
1953	Boston	6	13.8	**.522**	.636	3.5	1.7	5.2
1954	Boston	6	22.7	.289	.545	7.5	1.7	4.7
1955	Boston	**7**	**32.1**	.426	.579	**11.3**	1.9	9.0
Career		25	22.4	.384	.567	7.0	1.9	7.0
