= Matt Mazza =

American basketball player

Personal information
- Born: September 23, 1923 Niagara Falls, New York
- Died: June 11, 2003 (aged 79)
- Listed height: 6 ft 3 in (1.91 m)
- Listed weight: 210 lb (95 kg)

Career information
- High school: Trott (Niagara Falls, New York)
- College: Michigan State (1945–1947)
- BAA draft: 1947: undrafted
- Playing career: 1949–1950
- Position: Forward
- Number: 8

Career history
- 1949–1950: Sheboygan Red Skins

Career statistics
- Points: 98
- Assists: 27
- Stats at NBA.com
- Stats at Basketball Reference

Matthew Anthony Mazza (September 13, 1923 – June 11, 2003) was an American National Basketball Association forward. He played with the Sheboygan Red Skins during the 1949–50 NBA season.

== Career statistics ==
Legend
GP	Games played	GS	Games started	MPG	Minutes per game
FG%	Field goal percentage	3P%	3-point field goal percentage	FT%	Free throw percentage
RPG	Rebounds per game	APG	Assists per game	SPG	Steals per game
BPG	Blocks per game	PPG	Points per game	**Bold**	Career high

=== NBA ===
==== Regular season ====
Year	Team	GP	FG%	FT%	APG	PPG
1949–50	Sheboygan	26	.300	.711	1.1	3.8
