= 1949–50 Waterloo Hawks season =

- Head coach: Charley Shipp (8–27); Jack Smiley (11–16)
- Arena: McElroy Auditorium

Results
- Record: 19–43 (.306)
- Place: Division: 5th (Western)
- Playoff finish: Did not qualify
- Stats at Basketball Reference

The 1949–50 Waterloo Hawks season was their second professional season played and the first and only season in the newly formed National Basketball Association, which was a merger between the Basketball Association of America and the National Basketball League (which Waterloo first played for). After completing their only season in the NBA, the Waterloo Hawks joined the Sheboygan Red Skins, the original Denver Nuggets (who would later rebrand themselves as the Denver Frontier Refiners at first), and the previously withdrawn Anderson Packers (who left the NBA weeks before the other three teams did due to pressure involving other big market teams in places like New York, Boston, and Philadelphia alongside the higher costs involved with the newly-formed NBA being too much for them to bear) the day before the 1950 NBA draft was set to begin on April 24, 1950 to create the short-lived rivaling National Professional Basketball League as a failed effort to survive beyond the NBA.

== Draft picks ==
The Waterloo Hawks would participate in the 1949 NBL draft, which occurred months before the National Basketball League and the rivaling Basketball Association of America would merge operations to become the present-day National Basketball Association. However, as of 2026, no records of what the Hawks' draft picks were for the NBL have properly come up, with any information on who those final selections might have been being lost to time in the process.

== Roster ==
1949–50 Waterloo Hawks roster
Players

Pos.	No.	Player	Height	Weight	DOB	From
G/F	12	Don Boven	6 ft 4 in (1.93 m)	210 lb (95 kg)		Western Michigan
C	13	Harry Boykoff	6 ft 10 in (2.08 m)	225 lb (102 kg)		St. John's
G/F		Paul Cloyd	6 ft 2 in (1.88 m)	180 lb (82 kg)		Wisconsin
F/C	14	Elmer Gainer	6 ft 6 in (1.98 m)	195 lb (88 kg)		DePaul
F/C	14	Hoot Gibson	6 ft 5 in (1.96 m)	198 lb (90 kg)		Creighton
G/F	14	Dale Hamilton	6 ft 0 in (1.83 m)	180 lb (82 kg)		Franklin (IN)
G	4	Leo Kubiak	5 ft 11 in (1.80 m)	160 lb (73 kg)		Bowling Green
PF	7	Dick Mehen	6 ft 5 in (1.96 m)	195 lb (88 kg)		Tennessee
G		Ken Menke	6 ft 0 in (1.83 m)	168 lb (76 kg)		Illinois
C	10	Al Miksis	6 ft 7 in (2.01 m)	210 lb (95 kg)		Western Illinois
G	3	Gene Ollrich	5 ft 11 in (1.80 m)	160 lb (73 kg)		Drake
F	9	Johnny Orr	6 ft 3 in (1.91 m)	195 lb (88 kg)		Beloit
G/F	8	Stan Patrick	6 ft 2 in (1.88 m)	185 lb (84 kg)		Illinois
SG	5	John Payak	6 ft 4 in (1.93 m)	174 lb (79 kg)		Bowling Green
F	9	Jack Phelan	6 ft 5 in (1.96 m)	195 lb (88 kg)		DePaul
C	11	John Pritchard	6 ft 9 in (2.06 m)	220 lb (100 kg)		Drake
G	6	Wayne See	6 ft 3 in (1.91 m)	190 lb (86 kg)		Northern Arizona
G/F	5	Charley Shipp	6 ft 1 in (1.85 m)	200 lb (91 kg)		Catholic
G/F	10	Jack Smiley	6 ft 3 in (1.91 m)	190 lb (86 kg)		Illinois
G/F	8	Gene Stump	6 ft 2 in (1.88 m)	185 lb (84 kg)		DePaul
G/F	3	Bob Tough	6 ft 0 in (1.83 m)	185 lb (84 kg)		St. John's

Coaches
Head coach
- Charley Shipp
  Jack Smiley

Legend
- (DP) Unsigned draft pick
- (FA) Free agent
- (S) Suspended
- Injured

== Exhibition Games ==
Would mostly count as a pre-season for Waterloo, but one game was played during the regular season period, hence the labeling of this section being exhibition games for them this time around instead.

1949 Pre-season game log: 5–0 (Home: 2–1, Away: 2–0)
#	Date	Visitor	Score	Home	OT	Attendance	Record	Recap
1	October 13 (in Muscatine, Iowa)	Tri-Cities Blackhawks	82–83	Waterloo Hawks	3		1–0
2	October 22	Waterloo Hawks	70–47	Albert Lea Packers			2–0
3	October 25 (in Cedar Falls, Iowa)	Sheboygan Red Skins	63–70	Waterloo Hawks			3–0
4	October 29 (in Mason City, Iowa)	Sheboygan Red Skins	82–67	Waterloo Hawks			3–1
5	November 22	Waterloo Hawks	72–35	Wartburg College Knights			4–1

== Regular season ==
=== Season standings ===
Western Division	W	L	PCT	GB	Home	Road	Neutral	Div
x-Indianapolis Olympians	39	25	.609	–	24–7	12–16	3–2	26–9
x-Anderson Packers	37	27	.578	2	22–9	12–18	3–0	25–12
x-Tri-Cities Blackhawks	29	35	.453	10	20–13	6–20	3–2	20–17
x-Sheboygan Red Skins	22	40	.355	17	17–14	5–22	0–4	15–20
Waterloo Hawks	19	43	.306	20	16–15	2–22	1–6	13–22
Denver Nuggets	11	51	.177	28	9–16	1–25	1–10	8–27

=== Game log ===
1949–50 Game log
#	Date	Opponent	Score	High points	Record
1	November 2	New York	60–68	Harry Boykoff (15)	0–1
2	November 6	Boston	80–66	Stan Patrick (14)	1–1
3	November 9	Denver	80–65	Leo Kubiak (20)	2–1
4	November 10	at Fort Wayne	59–89	Charley Shipp (15)	2–2
5	November 12	at Tri-Cities	89–99	Leo Kubiak (17)	2–3
6	November 13	Anderson	69–81	Don Boven (16)	2–4
7	November 16	Sheboygan	73–76	Harry Boykoff (28)	2–5
8	November 17	at Sheboygan	95–97	Don Boven (26)	2–6
9	November 19	at Indianapolis	74–106	Dick Mehen (24)	2–7
10	November 20	Tri-Cities	75–62	Stan Patrick (21)	3–7
11	November 23	Rochester	71–90	Harry Boykoff (20)	3–8
12	November 26	at Rochester	95–120	Dick Mehen (23)	3–9
13	November 27	at Syracuse	62–80	Dick Mehen (14)	3–10
14	November 28	at Anderson	87–101	Dick Mehen (21)	3–11
15	November 30	Fort Wayne	95–71	Dick Mehen (30)	4–11
16	December 2	at Denver	63–74	Harry Boykoff (18)	4–12
17	December 4	at Denver	76–86	Dick Mehen (22)	4–13
18	December 7	Sheboygan	77–67	Don Boven (16)	5–13
19	December 10	Anderson	83–87 (OT)	Stan Patrick (15)	5–14
20	December 14	Philadelphia	70–73	Don Boven (15)	5–15
21	December 16	vs Baltimore	77–75	Dick Mehen (26)	6–15
22	December 17	vs Philadelphia	72–81	Dick Mehen (17)	6–16
23	December 20	Syracuse	70–95	Dick Mehen (17)	6–17
24	December 21	vs Chicago	70–78	Harry Boykoff (21)	6–18
25	December 22	at Anderson	84–101	Dick Mehen (17)	6–19
26	December 25	Indianapolis	97–93	Don Boven (17)	7–19
27	December 28	Chicago	80–87	Dick Mehen (19)	7–20
28	December 29	at Sheboygan	92–94	Dick Mehen (20)	7–21
29	December 31	Minneapolis	68–86	Leo Kubiak (18)	7–22
30	January 1	at St. Louis	79–91	Harry Boykoff (15)	7–23
31	January 3	Sheboygan	69–73	Leo Kubiak (17)	7–24
32	January 5	vs New York	70–82	Hoot Gibson (16)	7–25
33	January 7	at Washington	83–101	Boven, Mehen (18)	7–26
34	January 8	at Syracuse	68–84	Don Boven (12)	7–27
35	January 10	Syracuse	86–84 (OT)	Harry Boykoff (26)	8–27
36	January 12	at Anderson	69–80	Harry Boykoff (16)	8–28
37	January 13	at Indianapolis	64–80	Dick Mehen (18)	8–29
38	January 15	at Tri-Cities	80–84	Leo Kubiak (16)	8–30
39	January 18	St. Louis	80–69	Gene Stump (14)	9–30
40	January 19	vs Indianapolis	87–104	Dick Mehen (18)	9–31
41	January 21	Denver	88–84	John Payak (19)	10–31
42	January 24	at Indianapolis	69–107	Boykoff, Kubiak (14)	10–32
43	January 25	Denver	104–83	John Payak (21)	11–32
44	January 29	Tri-Cities	79–85	Don Boven (18)	11–33
45	February 1	Anderson	73–86	Dick Mehen (19)	11–34
46	February 3	at Syracuse	79–103	Dick Mehen (21)	11–35
47	February 4	vs Boston	82–100	Dick Mehen (27)	11–36
48	February 8	Washington	77–70	Leo Kubiak (17)	12–36
49	February 12	at Syracuse	98–102	Leo Kubiak (27)	12–37
50	February 13	at Anderson	80–93	Don Boven (14)	12–38
51	February 15	Indianapolis	76–74	Dick Mehen (18)	13–38
52	February 17	at Minneapolis	74–80	John Payak (15)	13–39
53	February 18	Tri-Cities	93–116	Jack Smiley (27)	13–40
54	February 19	Tri-Cities	84–63	Jack Smiley (22)	14–40
55	February 22	Baltimore	77–84	Dick Mehen (17)	14–41
56	February 23	at Sheboygan	86–81	Leo Kubiak (17)	15–41
57	February 26	at Denver	100–76	Harry Boykoff (19)	16–41
58	March 1	Syracuse	72–93	Harry Boykoff (17)	16–42
59	March 8	Denver	97–68	Leo Kubiak (15)	17–42
60	March 12	at Indianapolis	89–90	Harry Boykoff (24)	17–43
61	March 15	Sheboygan	87–69	Don Boven (16)	18–43
62	March 19	Tri-Cities	79–77	Harry Boykoff (22)	19–43

== Dispersal Draft ==
After the Hawks withdrew from the NBA alongside the Sheboygan Red Skins and original Denver Nuggets franchise on April 24, 1950, the league decided not to bother entering players from each of those three teams into a dispersal draft like they did for the Anderson Packers (despite them also joining the Hawks, Red Skins, and original Nuggets in creating the short-lived NPBL) and the St. Louis Bombers (who folded operations the same day the Hawks, Red Skins, and original Nuggets franchises joined the Packers in withdrawing from the NBA to create a new rivaling professional basketball league) once they got closer to entering the new season. However, unlike with the Red Skins or original Nuggets franchises, the Waterloo Hawks were able to get two of their players in Harry Boykoff and Dick Mehen into something akin to a dispersal draft of sorts for the NBA with two separate drawings being held for the player rights to be held for them on June 19, 1950. On that fateful day, the original Baltimore Bullets franchise would end up being the lucky winner for both of these players, though Baltimore would decide to trade Boykoff's player rights to the Boston Celtics before the start of the upcoming season.
