= Larry Killick =

American basketball player

Personal information
- Born: May 31, 1922 Burlington, Vermont, U.S.
- Died: January 31, 2013 (aged 90) Rockledge, Florida, U.S.

Career information
- High school: Burlington (Burlington, Vermont)
- College: Vermont (1942–1943); Dartmouth (1943–1944); Vermont (1946–1947)
- BAA draft: 1947: 1st round, 10th overall pick
- Drafted by: Baltimore Bullets

Career history
- 1947–1949: Glens Falls Commodores
- Stats at Basketball Reference

Lawrence Findley Killick (May 31, 1922 – January 31, 2013) was an American basketball player. Killick was drafted in the first round of the 1947 BAA draft as the 10th overall pick by the Baltimore Bullets, although he never ended up playing in the Basketball Association of America, which was the forerunner to the modern NBA.

== Playing career ==
Killick was raised in Burlington, Vermont, as the son of sportswriter Whitey Killick. He attended Burlington High School.

Killick attended the University of Vermont but had to split up his collegiate career due to his service in World War II. He was known as a good shooter, and in his staggered career at Vermont he scored 733 points, which for the era was a very high amount. Between stints at Vermont, he spent one season at Dartmouth College for their V-12 Navy College Training Program while in the United States Marine Corps. He was considered the sparkplug of the Dartmouth Indians basketball team during the 1943–44 season. Killick was the leading scorer of the 1946–47 Catamounts team which won the Yankee Conference regular season title, posting a 19–3 overall record under John C. Evans. The 19 wins was the highest win total ever for a Vermont team, and would not be surpassed until the 2001–02 season. Killick was selected to the East–West All-Star Game in his senior season at Vermont before being selected by the Bullets in the BAA draft.

Killick played semi-professional basketball for the Glens Falls Commodores, which he also owned, in the New York State Professional League for two seasons before moving on from the sport as a player. In the summer of 1956, Killick toured Europe, Northern Africa and the Middle East with the recent NBA champion Syracuse Nationals as part of the first goodwill team sent abroad.

== After basketball ==
He is also noted for inventing 'Little Kid Basketball' in 1952. "Equipment he designed made it possible for boys as young as six years old to become proficient in the game", according to his University of Vermont Hall of Fame entry.

In 1999, Sports Illustrated named him to their list of the Top 50 Vermont athletes of the 20th century, and was placed #25. In addition to being a member of the UVM Athletic Hall of Fame, he is also a member of the New England Basketball Hall of Fame. In his post-basketball life, Killick worked in marketing and management of local and statewide companies in Rockledge, Florida.
