= Bob Brown (basketball, born 1923) =

American basketball player

Personal information
- Born: November 12, 1923 Versailles, Ohio
- Died: July 28, 2016 (aged 92) Missouri City, Texas
- Listed height: 6 ft 4 in (1.93 m)
- Listed weight: 205 lb (93 kg)

Career information
- College: Miami (Ohio) (1942–1943, 1946–1949)
- Playing career: 1949–1951
- Position: Forward
- Number: 11, 20

Career history
- 1949: Providence Steamrollers
- 1949–1950: Denver Nuggets
- 1950–1951: Denver Refiners
- Stats at NBA.com
- Stats at Basketball Reference

Robert Edward "Bob" Brown (November 12, 1923 – July 28, 2016) was an American professional basketball player.

He played collegiately for the Miami University.

He played for the Providence Steamrollers (1948–49) and Denver Nuggets (1949–50) in the NBA for 82 games.

Brown died on July 28, 2016.

== BAA/NBA career statistics ==
Legend
GP	Games played	FG%	Field-goal percentage
FT%	Free-throw percentage	APG	Assists per game
PPG	Points per game	**Bold**	Career high

=== Regular season ===
Year	Team	GP	FG%	FT%	APG	PPG
1948–49	Providence	20	.333	**.723**	.7	5.4
1949–50	Denver	**62**	**.361**	.683	**1.6**	**11.7**
Career		82	.358	.689	1.4	10.1
