= Dillard Crocker =

American basketball player

Personal information
- Born: January 19, 1925 Coffee County, Tennessee, U.S.
- Died: September 1, 2014 (aged 89) Niles, Michigan, U.S.
- Listed height: 6 ft 4 in (1.93 m)
- Listed weight: 205 lb (93 kg)

Career information
- High school: Niles (Niles, Michigan)
- College: Western Michigan (1947–1948)
- Playing career: 1948–1953
- Position: Power forward
- Number: 30, 16, 20, 7

Career history
- 1948: Detroit Vagabond Kings
- 1948: Fort Wayne Pistons
- 1948–1949: Anderson Duffey Packers
- 1949–1950: Denver Nuggets
- 1950: Denver Refiners
- 1950–1951: Anderson Packers
- 1951: Indianapolis Olympians
- 1951–1953: Milwaukee Hawks

Career highlights
- NBL champion (1949)
- Stats at NBA.com
- Stats at Basketball Reference

James Dillard Crocker (January 19, 1925 – September 1, 2014) was an American professional basketball player. He played at the power forward position.

Born in Coffee County, Tennessee in 1925, Crocker played one season in the Basketball Association of America (BAA) and three seasons in the National Basketball Association (NBA). During that time, Crocker played for the Fort Wayne Pistons (1948–49), the Denver Nuggets (1949–50), the Indianapolis Olympians (1951), and the Milwaukee Hawks (1951–53). He spent the 1950–51 season in the National Professional Basketball League (NPBL). He attended Western Michigan University.

Crocker died in Niles, Michigan on September 1, 2014.

== BAA/NBA career statistics ==
Legend
GP	Games played	MPG	Minutes per game
FG%	Field-goal percentage	FT%	Free-throw percentage
RPG	Rebounds per game	APG	Assists per game
PPG	Points per game	**Bold**	Career high

=== Regular season ===
Year	Team	GP	MPG	FG%	FT%	RPG	APG	PPG
1948–49	Fort Wayne	2	–	.250	.667	–	.0	3.0
1949–50	Denver	53	–	.292	.735	–	1.6	**13.6**
1951–52	Indianapolis	6	3.8	**.400**	**.833**	.5	.0	1.5
1951–52	Milwaukee	32	**23.8**	.350	.662	**3.4**	**1.8**	8.9
1952–53	Milwaukee	**61**	12.7	.352	.688	1.7	1.0	5.4
Career		154	15.7	.316	.706	2.2	1.3	8.8
