= Walt Lautenbach =

American basketball player

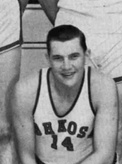

Personal information
- Born: November 17, 1922 Milwaukee, Wisconsin, U.S.
- Died: September 9, 1997 (aged 74)
- Listed height: 6 ft 2 in (1.88 m)
- Listed weight: 185 lb (84 kg)

Career information
- High school: Plymouth (Plymouth, Wisconsin)
- College: Wisconsin (1941–1943, 1946–1947)
- BAA draft: 1947: undrafted
- Playing career: 1947–1950
- Position: Shooting guard / small forward
- Number: 9

Career history
- 1947–1949: Oshkosh All-Stars
- 1949–1950: Sheboygan Red Skins

Career NBA statistics
- Points: 238
- Assists: 73
- Stats at NBA.com
- Stats at Basketball Reference

Walter Henry Lautenbach Jr. (November 17, 1922 – September 9, 1997) was an American National Basketball Association player. He played with the Sheboygan Red Skins during the 1949-50 NBA season. He had also played in the National Basketball League for two seasons with the Oshkosh All-Stars.

He attended high school in Plymouth, Wisconsin.

== Career statistics ==
Legend
GP	Games played	GS	Games started	MPG	Minutes per game
FG%	Field goal percentage	3P%	3-point field goal percentage	FT%	Free throw percentage
RPG	Rebounds per game	APG	Assists per game	SPG	Steals per game
BPG	Blocks per game	PPG	Points per game	**Bold**	Career high

=== NBA ===
==== Regular season ====
Year	Team	GP	FG%	FT%	APG	PPG
1949–50	Sheboygan	55	.309	.691	1.3	4.3
