= Earl Dodd =

American basketball player

Personal information
- Born: November 1, 1924 Wood River, Illinois, U.S.
- Died: October 30, 2004 (aged 79) Alton, Illinois, U.S.
- Listed height: 6 ft 5 in (1.96 m)
- Listed weight: 175 lb (79 kg)

Career information
- High school: East Alton-Wood River (Wood River, Illinois)
- College: Truman (1946–1948)
- NBA draft: 1949: 5th round, –
- Drafted by: St. Louis Bombers
- Position: Forward
- Number: 31

Career history
- 1949: Denver Nuggets

Career highlights
- 2× First-team All-MIAA (1947, 1948)
- Stats at NBA.com
- Stats at Basketball Reference

Glenn Earl Dodd (November 1, 1924 – October 30, 2004) was an American professional basketball player. Dodd was selected in the fifth round of the 1949 BAA Draft by the St. Louis Bombers after a collegiate career at Northeast Missouri. He played for the Denver Nuggets for nine total games in 1949.

== Career statistics ==
Legend
GP	Games played	GS	Games started	MPG	Minutes per game
FG%	Field goal percentage	3P%	3-point field goal percentage	FT%	Free throw percentage
RPG	Rebounds per game	APG	Assists per game	SPG	Steals per game
BPG	Blocks per game	PPG	Points per game	**Bold**	Career high

=== NBA ===
==== Regular season ====
Year	Team	GP	FG%	FT%	APG	PPG
1949–50	Denver	9	.222	.600	.7	1.7
