= Chips Sobek =

American basketball player

Personal information
- Born: February 10, 1920 Hammond, Indiana, U.S.
- Died: April 9, 1990 (aged 70)
- Listed height: 6 ft 0 in (1.83 m)
- Listed weight: 180 lb (82 kg)

Career information
- High school: Hammond (Hammond, Indiana)
- College: Notre Dame (1939–1942)
- Playing career: 1945–1950
- Position: Guard
- Number: 6

Career history
- 1945–1946: Indianapolis Kautskys
- 1946–1948: Toledo Jeeps
- 1948–1949: Hammond Calumet Buccaneers
- 1949–1950: Sheboygan Red Skins

Career highlights
- First-team All-American – MSG (1941)

Career NBA statistics
- Points: 346
- Assists: 95
- Stats at NBA.com
- Stats at Basketball Reference

George Edward "Chips" Sobek (February 10, 1920 – April 9, 1990) was an American player in the National Basketball Association (NBA). He played with the Sheboygan Red Skins during the 1949-50 NBA season. Sobek had also played in the National Basketball League, most notably for the Toledo Jeeps.

A native of Hammond, Indiana, Sobek attended Notre Dame, where he earned All-American status in 1941, as chosen by Madison Square Garden, although he did not make the consensus team. After graduating from Notre Dame, he would also play a season with the Naval Station Great Lakes while under service with them.

Sobek also played professional baseball, spending three years in the minor leagues. With the 1946 Superior Blues, he led Northern League second basemen in fielding percentage (.964), double plays (61), putouts (353) and assists (322). He hit .308/~.368/.371. In 1948, he hit .297 for the Hot Springs Bathers and had a brief tenure with the Waterloo White Hawks. In 1949, he hit .244 for Superior to conclude his playing career.

Sobek was later a Chicago White Sox scout from 1950 to 1984, signing Denny McLain (most notably), Steve Trout, and Mike Squires. He also managed several seasons in the Sox organization. He also scouted for the San Francisco Giants from 1985 to 1988.

Sobek was the athletic director and baseball coach at Thornton Fractional High School in Calumet City, Illinois, for 26 years and he directed the White Sox Boys Camp in Chilton, Wisconsin.

Sobek also was a longtime college basketball referee, notably for the Big Ten Conference. He was an official in at least one small college championship contest.

== Career statistics ==
=== NBA ===
==== Regular season ====
Year	Team	GP	FG%	FT%	APG	PPG
1949–50	Sheboygan	60	.378	.761	1.6	5.8

==== Playoffs ====
Year	Team	GP	FG%	FT%	APG	PPG
1949–50	Sheboygan	3	.500	.750	1.0	10.7
