= Dick Mehen =

American basketball player (1922–1986)

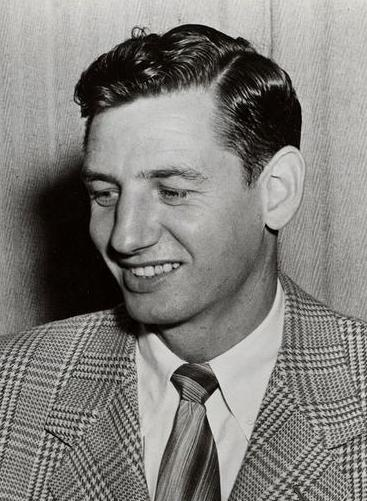

Personal information
- Born: May 20, 1922 Wheeling, West Virginia, U.S.
- Died: December 14, 1986 (aged 64) North Olmsted, Ohio, U.S.
- Listed height: 6 ft 5 in (1.96 m)
- Listed weight: 195 lb (88 kg)

Career information
- High school: Wheeling (Wheeling, West Virginia)
- College: Tennessee (1941–1943, 1946–1947)
- BAA draft: 1947: undrafted
- Playing career: 1947–1952
- Position: Power forward / center
- Number: 7, 10 ,17

Career history
- 1947–1948: Toledo Jeeps
- 1948–1950: Waterloo Hawks
- 1950: Baltimore Bullets
- 1950: Boston Celtics
- 1950–1951: Fort Wayne Pistons
- 1951–1952: Milwaukee Hawks

Career highlights
- All-NBL First Team (1949); Second-team All-American – Pic (1942); 2× First-team All-SEC (1942, 1943)

Career statistics
- Points: 2,067 (10.7 ppg)
- Rebounds: 505 (3.9 rpg)
- Assists: 480 (2.5 apg)
- Stats at NBA.com
- Stats at Basketball Reference

Richard Peter Mehen (May 20, 1922 – December 14, 1986) was an American professional basketball player. He played college basketball for the Tennessee Volunteers.

== Career ==
Mehen played college basketball at the University of Tennessee, but his career was interrupted by service in the United States Air Force during World War II alongside his brother Bernie, who was also a college and pro basketball player.

Mehen began his career with the Toledo Jeeps of the NBL, and was transferred with teammate Harry Boykoff to the Waterloo Hawks, where he played one season in the NBL and another in the NBA. After the Hawks left the league, he had stints with the Baltimore Bullets, Boston Celtics, Fort Wayne Pistons and Milwaukee Hawks.

== Stats ==
=== NBA ===
==== Regular season ====
Season	Age	Team	League	G	GS	MIN	FG	FGA	FG%	3P	3PA	3P%	FT	FTA	FT%	ORB	DRB	REB	AST	STL	BLK	TOV	PF	PTS
1949–50	27	Waterloo Hawks	NBA	62			5.6	13.3	.420				3.2	4.5	.705				3.1				3.3	14.4
1950–51	28	TOTAL	NBA	66			2.9	8.1	.361				1.4	1.9	.732			3.4	1.8				2.3	7.2
1950–51	28	Baltimore Bullets	NBA	16			3.6	10.6	.335				2.3	3.2	.725			4.8	3.4				2.6	9.4
1950–51	28	Boston Celtics	NBA	7			2.4	7.4	.327				1.4	2.1	.667			3.7	1.6				2.0	6.3
1950–51	28	Fort Wayne Pistons	NBA	43			2.7	7.2	.381				1.0	1.3	.754			2.8	1.2				2.2	6.5
1951–52	29	Milwaukee Hawks	NBA	65		35.3	4.5	12.7	.356				1.8	2.6	.701			4.3	2.6				3.2	10.8
Total			NBA	193		35.3	4.3	11.3	.381				2.1	3.0	.709			3.9	2.5				2.9	10.7

==== Playoffs ====
Season	Age	Team	League	G	GS	MIN	FG	FGA	FG%	3P	3PA	3P%	FT	FTA	FT%	ORB	DRB	REB	AST	STL	BLK	TOV	PF	PTS		
1950-51	28	Fort Wayne Pistons	NBA	3		12	29			2	4		14	3				9	26	.414		.500		8.7	4.7	1.0
Total			NBA	3		12	29			2	4		14	3				9	26	.414		.500		8.7	4.7	1.0
