= Jack Toomay =

American basketball player

Personal information
- Born: August 9, 1922 Ontario, California, U.S.
- Died: March 12, 2008 (aged 85) Carlsbad, California, U.S.
- Listed height: 6 ft 6 in (1.98 m)
- Listed weight: 215 lb (98 kg)

Career information
- High school: Webb School (Claremont, California)
- College: Pacific (1941–1944, 1946–1947)
- BAA draft: 1947: undrafted
- Playing career: 1947–1950
- Position: Center
- Number: 20, 15, 19

Career history
- 1947: Chicago Stags
- 1947–1948: Providence Steamrollers
- 1948: Washington Capitols
- 1948–1949: Baltimore Bullets
- 1949–1950: Denver Nuggets
- Stats at NBA.com
- Stats at Basketball Reference

Major General John Crawford Toomay (August 9, 1922 – March 12, 2008) was an American professional basketball player. He played for several teams in the Basketball Association of America and National Basketball Association. He averaged 6.7 points and 0.9 assists per game in 131 career games played.

Toomay holds the NBA record for the most personal fouls committed in a playoff game with 8. He later became a major general in the United States Air Force and was a key architect of nuclear defense strategies.

== BAA/NBA career statistics ==
Legend
GP	Games played	FG%	Field-goal percentage
FT%	Free-throw percentage	APG	Assists per game
PPG	Points per game	**Bold**	Career high

=== Regular season ===
Year	Team	GP	FG%	FT%	APG	PPG
1947–48	Chicago	19	.191	.550	.1	1.5
1947–48	Providence	14	.361	.690	.4	**10.9**
1948–49	Washington	13	.381	**.750**	.1	1.9
1948–49	Baltimore	23	.381	.659	.5	3.3
1949–50	Denver	**62**	**.397**	.705	**1.5**	9.6
Career		131	.376	.691	.9	6.7

=== Playoffs ===
Year	Team	GP	FG%	FT%	APG	PPG
1949	Baltimore	1	.200	.714	.0	7.0
Career		1	.200	.714	.0	7.0
