= Joe Bradley (basketball) =

American basketball player

Personal information
- Born: September 24, 1928 Washington, Oklahoma, U.S.
- Died: June 5, 1987 (aged 58) Enid, Oklahoma, U.S.
- Listed height: 6 ft 3 in (1.91 m)
- Listed weight: 175 lb (79 kg)

Career information
- High school: Cowden (Cowden, Oklahoma)
- College: Oklahoma State (1945–1949)
- BAA draft: 1949: undrafted
- Playing career: 1949–1951
- Position: Guard
- Number: 12

Career history
- 1949–1950: Chicago Stags
- 1950–1951: Louisville Alumnites

Career highlights
- NCAA champion (1946)
- Stats at NBA.com
- Stats at Basketball Reference

Joseph L. Bradley (September 24, 1928 – June 5, 1987) was an American basketball player.

Born in Washington, Oklahoma, he played collegiately for the Oklahoma State University.

He played for the Chicago Stags (1949–50) in the NBA for 46 games.

== Career statistics ==
Legend
GP	Games played	GS	Games started	MPG	Minutes per game
FG%	Field goal percentage	3P%	3-point field goal percentage	FT%	Free throw percentage
RPG	Rebounds per game	APG	Assists per game	SPG	Steals per game
BPG	Blocks per game	PPG	Points per game	**Bold**	Career high

=== NBA ===
==== Regular season ====
Year	Team	GP	FG%	FT%	APG	PPG
1949–50	Chicago	46	.269	.395	.8	1.9
