= Odie Spears =

American basketball player (1924–1985)

Personal information
- Born: June 26, 1925 Scottsville, Kentucky, U.S.
- Died: March 28, 1985 (aged 59) Louisville, Kentucky, U.S.
- Listed height: 6 ft 5 in (1.96 m)
- Listed weight: 205 lb (93 kg)

Career information
- High school: Scottsville (Scottsville, Kentucky)
- College: Western Kentucky (1941–1943, 1946–1948)
- BAA draft: 1948: -- round, --
- Drafted by: Chicago Stags
- Playing career: 1948–1957
- Position: Small forward
- Number: 20, 15, 8, 19

Career history
- 1948–1950: Chicago Stags
- 1950–1951: Louisville Alumnites
- 1951–1955: Rochester Royals
- 1955–1957: Fort Wayne Pistons
- 1956–1957: St. Louis Hawks

Career highlights
- Second-team All-American – Converse (1948)

Career BAA and NBA statistics
- Points: 4,161 (8.7 ppg)
- Rebounds: 1,409 (4.0 rpg)
- Assists: 917 (1.9 apg)
- Stats at NBA.com
- Stats at Basketball Reference

Marion Odicea "Odie" Spears (June 17, 1924 – March 28, 1985) was an American basketball player.

A 6'5" small forward from Scottsville, Kentucky, Spears attended nearby Western Kentucky University but saw little playing time during his first two seasons. After his sophomore year, he left Western Kentucky to serve in the United States Army, where he played three seasons for the 326th Glider Infantry basketball team at Fort Bragg, North Carolina. He then returned to Western Kentucky in 1946 with improved skills and confidence and became the team's leading scorer during his junior and senior years. Spears received All-American honors in 1948 after leading Western Kentucky to a third-place finish in the National Invitation Tournament (then the nation's premier basketball tournament).

From 1948 to 1957, Spears played professionally in the National Basketball Association as a member of the Chicago Stags, Rochester Royals, Fort Wayne Pistons, and St. Louis Hawks. He averaged 8.7 points per game and 4.0 rebounds per game in his NBA career and ranked as one of the league's top-ten free throw shooters three times. Spears also played during the 1950–51 season for the Louisville Alumnites of the National Professional Basketball League.

After his playing career ended, Spears moved to Louisville, Kentucky, where he became an insurance executive. He was elected to the Western Kentucky Hall of Fame in 1993.

== BAA/NBA career statistics ==
Legend
GP	Games played	MPG	Minutes per game
FG%	Field-goal percentage	FT%	Free-throw percentage
RPG	Rebounds per game	APG	Assists per game
PPG	Points per game	**Bold**	Career high

=== Regular season ===
Year	Team	GP	MPG	FG%	FT%	RPG	APG	PPG
1948–49	Chicago	57	–	.317	.667	–	1.7	9.3
1949–50	Chicago	68	–	.357	.687	–	2.3	**10.5**
1951–52	Rochester	66	25.3	.395	.763	**4.6**	**2.5**	8.6
1952–53	Rochester	62	22.8	**.401**	.819	4.0	1.8	9.6
1953–54	Rochester	**72**	22.7	.364	.769	4.3	1.5	7.7
1954–55	Rochester	71	**26.6**	.386	.812	4.2	2.1	9.5
1955–56	Fort Wayne	**72**	19.1	.355	.791	3.2	1.7	6.8
1956–57	Fort Wayne / St. Louis	11	10.7	.316	**.864**	1.4	.6	3.9
Career		479	22.9	.366	.763	4.0	1.9	8.7

=== Playoffs ===
Year	Team	GP	MPG	FG%	FT%	RPG	APG	PPG
1949	Chicago	2	–	.269	.571	–	1.0	9.0
1950	Chicago	2	–	.409	.500	–	.5	11.5
1952	Rochester	6	20.5	.303	.563	3.5	1.5	4.8
1953	Rochester	3	20.7	**.421**	.800	4.0	.0	6.7
1954	Rochester	6	20.2	.286	**.857**	2.2	1.3	4.7
1955	Rochester	3	**30.0**	.267	.688	**4.7**	**3.3**	**11.7**
1956	Fort Wayne	**10**	17.7	.323	.565	2.9	1.4	5.3
Career		32	20.5	.315	.637	3.2	1.4	6.4
