= Al Guokas =

American basketball player (1925–1990)

Personal information
- Born: July 8, 1925 Philadelphia, Pennsylvania, U.S.
- Died: August 2, 1990 (aged 65) Somers Point, New Jersey, U.S.
- Listed height: 6 ft 5 in (1.96 m)
- Listed weight: 200 lb (91 kg)

Career information
- High school: St. Joseph's (Philadelphia, Pennsylvania)
- College: Saint Joseph's (1947–1948)
- Playing career: 1948–1950
- Position: Forward
- Number: 21, 11
- Coaching career: 1950–1951

Career history

Playing
- 1948–1950: Denver Nuggets
- 1950: Philadelphia Warriors

Coaching
- 1950–1951: York Victory A.C.
- Stats at NBA.com
- Stats at Basketball Reference

Albert George Guokas (/ˈɡuːkəs/ GOO-kəs; August 7, 1925 – August 2, 1990) was an American professional basketball player who spent one season in the National Basketball Association as a member of the Denver Nuggets and the Philadelphia Warriors during the 1948–49 season. He attended Saint Joseph's University. His brother, Matt Sr. and nephew Matt were also professional basketball players.

Guokas served as head coach of the York Victory A.C. in the Eastern Professional Basketball League (EPBL) during the 1950–51 season and accumulated a 15–11 record.

== Career statistics ==
Legend
GP	Games played	GS	Games started	MPG	Minutes per game
FG%	Field goal percentage	3P%	3-point field goal percentage	FT%	Free throw percentage
RPG	Rebounds per game	APG	Assists per game	SPG	Steals per game
BPG	Blocks per game	PPG	Points per game	**Bold**	Career high

=== Regular season ===
Year	Team	GP	FG%	FT%	APG	PPG
1949–50	Denver	**41**	**.317**	.532	**2.1**	**4.8**
1949–50	Philadelphia	16	.250	**1.000**	.6	1.1
Career		57	.311	.560	1.7	3.8

=== Playoffs ===
Year	Team	GP	FG%	FT%	APG	PPG
1949–50	Philadelphia	2	.500	.333	2.5	3.0
