= Ed Mikan =

American basketball player (1925–1999)

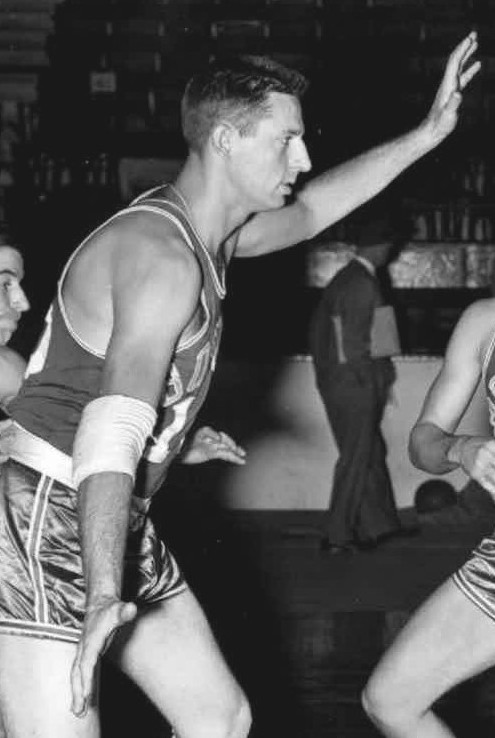
- Mikan during a Boston Celtics practice, c. 1953

Personal information
- Born: October 20, 1925 Joliet, Illinois, U.S.
- Died: October 22, 1999 (aged 74) La Grange, Illinois, U.S.
- Listed height: 6 ft 8 in (2.03 m)
- Listed weight: 230 lb (104 kg)

Career information
- High school: Joliet Catholic Academy (Joliet, Illinois)
- College: DePaul (1945–1948)
- BAA draft: 1948: 1st round, 5th overall pick
- Drafted by: Chicago Stags
- Playing career: 1948–1954
- Position: Center
- Number: 18, 15, 10

Career history
- 1948–1949: Chicago Stags
- 1949–1950: Rochester Royals
- 1950: Washington Capitols
- 1951–1952: Philadelphia Warriors
- 1952–1953: Indianapolis Olympians
- 1953–1954: Boston Celtics

Career highlights
- Third-team All-American – Helms (1948)

Career BAA and NBA statistics
- Points: 2,163 (6.7 ppg)
- Rebounds: 1,093 (5.5 rpg)
- Assists: 296 (0.9 apg)
- Stats at NBA.com
- Stats at Basketball Reference

Edward Anton Mikan (October 20, 1925 – October 22, 1999) was an American professional basketball player. He was the younger brother of George Mikan.

After starring at Joliet Catholic High School in Illinois, the 6'8" Mikan joined the DePaul Blue Demons men's basketball team. With his brother, he helped DePaul win the 1945 National Invitational Tournament Championship over Bowling Green State University. Coach Ray Meyer said that he "was probably the second-best center we ever had at DePaul, only behind his brother George".

From 1948 to 1954, Ed Mikan played in the National Basketball Association as a member of the Chicago Stags, Rochester Royals, Washington Capitols, Philadelphia Warriors, Indianapolis Olympians, and Boston Celtics. He averaged 6.7 points and 5.5 rebounds per game in his NBA career. His best year statistically was his rookie season, when he averaged 9.9 points.

Mikan later worked as the supervisor of officials for the American Basketball Association, then focused his attention on his insurance and real estate business.

== BAA/NBA career statistics ==
Legend
GP	Games played	MPG	Minutes per game
FG%	Field-goal percentage	FT%	Free-throw percentage
RPG	Rebounds per game	APG	Assists per game
PPG	Points per game	**Bold**	Career high

=== Regular season ===
Year	Team	GP	MPG	FG%	FT%	RPG	APG	PPG
1948–49	Chicago	60	–	.314	.743	–	1.0	**9.9**
1949–50	Chicago	21	–	.244	.776	–	.7	5.1
1949–50	Rochester	44	–	.299	.758	–	.6	3.7
1950–51	Rochester / Washington / Philadelphia	61	–	.347	.725	5.6	1.0	8.6
1951–52	Philadelphia	**66**	**27.0**	**.354**	.784	**7.5**	**1.3**	7.9
1952–53	Philadelphia	19	18.8	.291	.794	6.3	1.2	5.5
1952–53	Indianapolis	43	13.2	.247	**.813**	2.7	.4	3.0
1953–54	Boston	9	7.9	.333	.556	2.2	.3	2.3
Career		323	20.3	.320	.756	5.5	.9	6.7

=== Playoffs ===
Year	Team	GP	MPG	FG%	FT%	RPG	APG	PPG
1949	Chicago	2	–	.211	.000	.0	.5	8.0
1950	Rochester	2	–	**.333**	.909	–	1.0	**13.0**
1951	Philadelphia	2	–	.231	.909	**10.5**	**1.5**	11.0
1952	Philadelphia	**3**	**24.7**	.318	.857	6.7	.7	6.7
1953	Indianapolis	2	16.0	.200	**1.000**	3.5	.0	3.5
Career		11	21.2	.258	.829	6.9	.7	8.3
