= Bobby Cook (basketball) =

American basketball player

Personal information
- Born: April 1, 1923 Harvard, Illinois, U.S.
- Died: October 11, 2004 (aged 81) Milwaukee County, Wisconsin, U.S.
- Listed height: 5 ft 10 in (1.78 m)
- Listed weight: 155 lb (70 kg)

Career information
- High school: Harvard (Harvard, Illinois)
- College: Wisconsin (1945–1948)
- BAA draft: 1948: undrafted
- Playing career: 1948–1952
- Position: Shooting guard / small forward
- Number: 3

Career history

Playing
- 1948–1952: Sheboygan Red Skins

Coaching
- 1951–1952: Sheboygan Red Skins

Career highlights
- Second-team All-American – True (1947); Third-team All-American – Converse (1947); 2× All-Big Nine team (1947, 1949)

Career NBA statistics
- Points: 587 (11.5 ppg)
- Assists: 158 (3.1 apg)
- Stats at NBA.com
- Stats at Basketball Reference

Robert Bernard Cook (April 1, 1923 – October 11, 2004) was an American basketball player who played for the Sheboygan Red Skins in the National Basketball League, National Basketball Association and the National Professional Basketball League. Previously, he had been drafted by the Fort Wayne Pistons of the Basketball Association of America in 1948.

He played college basketball for the University of Wisconsin where he broke the scoring records of Johnny Kotz and Gene Englund. He was named to the All-Big Nine team as a junior and senior and led the conference in scoring in 1947 with 15.6 points per game. In 1992, he was elected to the UW Athletic Hall of Fame.

During the first season of the NBA, following the merger of the NBL and BAA, Cook set the NBA single game scoring record with 44 points in a 115–92 win against the Denver Nuggets on January 12, 1950.

== Personal life ==
He is buried with his wife, Verone, in Lake Geneva, Wisconsin, where he had owned a Ford dealership.

== Career statistics ==
Legend
GP	Games played	GS	Games started	MPG	Minutes per game
FG%	Field goal percentage	3P%	3-point field goal percentage	FT%	Free throw percentage
RPG	Rebounds per game	APG	Assists per game	SPG	Steals per game
BPG	Blocks per game	PPG	Points per game	**Bold**	Career high

=== NBA ===
==== Regular season ====
Year	Team	GP	FG%	FT%	APG	PPG
1949–50	Sheboygan	51	.358	.790	3.1	11.5

==== Playoffs ====
Year	Team	GP	FG%	FT%	APG	PPG
1949–50	Sheboygan	3	.300	.500	2.0	3.0
