= Harry Boykoff =

American basketball player (1922–2001)

Personal information
- Born: July 24, 1922 Brooklyn, New York, U.S.
- Died: February 20, 2001 (aged 78) Santa Monica, California, U.S.
- Listed height: 6 ft 10 in (2.08 m)
- Listed weight: 225 lb (102 kg)

Career information
- High school: Thomas Jefferson (Brooklyn, New York)
- College: St. John's (1942–1943, 1945–1947)
- BAA draft: 1947: undrafted
- Playing career: 1947–1951
- Position: Center
- Number: 13, 24, 16

Career history
- 1947–1948: Toledo Jeeps
- 1948–1950: Waterloo Hawks
- 1950–1951: Boston Celtics
- 1951: Tri-Cities Blackhawks

Career highlights
- Consensus first-team All-American (1943); Second-team All-American – True (1946); National Invitation Tournament MVP (1943)

Career NBA statistics
- Points: 1,105 (10.1 ppg)
- Assists: 209 (1.9 apg)
- Stats at NBA.com
- Stats at Basketball Reference

Harry J. Boykoff (July 24, 1922 – February 20, 2001) was an American professional basketball player. During his career he was often referred to as "Heshie", Big Hesh", and "Big Boy". He stood at 6 ft 10 in (2.08 m) tall.

== Early life ==
Boykoff was born on the Lower East Side, grew up in the Brownsville neighborhood of Brooklyn, New York, and was Jewish.

== Basketball career ==
Boykoff played high school basketball for Thomas Jefferson High School in Brooklyn, and college basketball for St. John's University (New York City), where he was an All American three years in a row.

In a 1947 game at Madison Square Garden, while playing for St John's, he scored 54 points, more than the combined total of the opposing team.

Boykoff led St John's to the 1943 National Invitation Tournament championship. He was awarded the MVP Award, and was named on several All-American teams. He received a gold basketball emblematic of his selection on the All-America basketball team appearing in The Sporting News, a national sports newspaper.

He played for the Waterloo Hawks (1949–50), Boston Celtics and Tri-Cities Blackhawks (1950–51) in the National Basketball Association for a total of 109 games.

In his 1948–49 season for Waterloo, Boykoff's shooting average (41.3%) was the fourth-highest in the league.

While playing for the Celtics, he was the highest paid NBA player, at around $15,000 per year.

He became so proficient at blocking shots that because of his play, the rules of the game were changed to prevent shots being blocked on their way down toward the basket (goaltending).

== Personal ==
Even with his outstanding record, Boykoff remained humble. He was quoted as saying:

I'm not an athlete, I'm just a big guy and a lucky one.

Later in life Boykoff appeared in films and television shows such as Star Trek, Frasier, Town & Country, The Crew, on McDonald's cups and commercials, and a few others.

Boykoff died in California at age 78 of lung cancer.

== Career statistics ==
Legend
| GP | Games played | GS | Games started | MPG | Minutes per game |
| FG% | Field goal percentage | 3P% | 3-point field goal percentage | FT% | Free throw percentage |
| RPG | Rebounds per game | APG | Assists per game | SPG | Steals per game |
| BPG | Blocks per game | PPG | Points per game | **Bold** | Career high |

=== NBA ===
==== Regular season ====
| Year | Team | GP | FG% | FT% | RPG | APG | PPG |
|---|---|---|---|---|---|---|---|
| 1949–50 | Waterloo | **61** | **.413** | .775 | – | **2.4** | **12.8** |
| 1950–51 | Boston | 32 | .384 | .714 | 4.2 | 1.3 | 6.3 |
| 1950–51 | Tri-Cities | 16 | .361 | **.784** | **5.3** | 1.3 | 7.8 |
| Career | | 109 | .400 | .765 | 4.6 | 1.9 | 10.1 |

== See also ==
- List of select Jewish basketball players
