= Frank Kudelka (basketball) =

American basketball player (1925–1993)

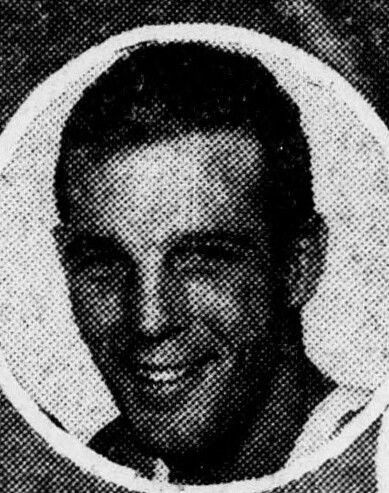
- Kudelka, circa 1950

Personal information
- Born: June 25, 1925 San Francisco, California, U.S.
- Died: May 4, 1993 (aged 67)
- Listed height: 6 ft 2 in (1.88 m)
- Listed weight: 193 lb (88 kg)

Career information
- High school: Lowell (San Francisco, California)
- College: Saint Mary's (1946–1949)
- BAA draft: 1949: undrafted
- Playing career: 1949–1953
- Position: Shooting guard / small forward
- Number: 7, 18, 23, 21, 8, 14

Career history
- 1949–1950: Chicago Stags
- 1950–1951: Washington Capitols
- 1951: Boston Celtics
- 1951–1952: Baltimore Bullets
- 1952–1953: Philadelphia Warriors

Career highlights
- Third-team All-American – Helms (1948)
- Stats at NBA.com
- Stats at Basketball Reference

Frank Carl Kudelka (June 25, 1925 – May 4, 1993), nicknamed Apples, was an American National Basketball Association (NBA) player. In his first two years at Saint Mary's College of California, Kudelka averaged 18.1 points per game. Once the shotclock was introduced to college basketball in his junior season, Frank averaged 20.4 points per game. He was the nation's fourth leading scorer. As a senior at Saint Mary's, Frank averaged 16.2 points per game. He was also named an All-American basketball player by the Helms Foundation after his senior season. Frank made his NBA debut in the 1949-50 NBA season for the Chicago Stags. In his first NBA season, Frank averaged 6.7 points and 2.0 assists per game. Frank played four seasons in the NBA with the Stags, Washington Capitols, Boston Celtics, Baltimore Bullets and Philadelphia Warriors. In his NBA career, Frank averaged 7.2 points, 3.2 rebounds, and 2.1 assists per game.

== NBA career statistics ==
Legend
GP	Games played	GS	Games started	MPG	Minutes per game
FG%	Field goal percentage	3P%	3-point field goal percentage	FT%	Free throw percentage
RPG	Rebounds per game	APG	Assists per game	SPG	Steals per game
BPG	Blocks per game	PPG	Points per game	**Bold**	Career high

=== Regular season ===
Year	Team	GP	MPG	FG%	FT%	RPG	APG	PPG
1949–50	Chicago	65	–	.326	.636	–	2.0	6.7
1950–51	Washington/Boston	62	–	.346	.697	2.5	1.7	7.1
1951–52	Baltimore	65	24.4	.332	**.767**	**4.2**	**2.8**	**9.3**
1952–53	Baltimore	16	14.2	.333	.639	2.7	1.8	4.9
1952–53	Philadelphia	20	17.0	.284	.656	2.3	2.1	4.2
Career		228	21.3	.331	.708	3.2	2.1	7.2

=== Playoffs ===
Year	Team	GP	FG%	FT%	RPG	APG	PPG
1950	Chicago	**2**	.200	**.500**	–	**2.0**	2.5
1951	Boston	1	**.500**	.000	5.0	**2.0**	**4.0**
Career		3	.286	.200	5.0	2.0	3.0
