= 1949–50 New York Knicks season =

Season of National Basketball Association team the New York Knicks

- Head coach: Joe Lapchick
- General manager: Ned Irish
- Arena: Madison Square Garden

Results
- Record: 40–28 (.588)
- Place: Division: 2nd (Eastern)
- Playoff finish: East Division finals (lost to Nationals 1–2)
- Stats at Basketball Reference

Local media
- Television: WABD/WPIX
- Radio: WMGM

The 1949–50 New York Knickerbockers season was the fourth season for the team and the first following the merger of the Basketball Association of America and the National Basketball League that formed the National Basketball Association (NBA). In the regular season, the Knickerbockers finished in second place in the Eastern Division, posting a 40–28 record and advancing to the NBA playoffs. New York won its first round series against the Washington Capitols, 2–0, to make it to the Eastern Division finals. There, the team was defeated two games to one by the Syracuse Nationals.

== BAA/NBA draft ==
Round	Pick	Player	Position	Nationality	School/Club team
1	7	Dick McGuire	G	United States	St. John's
2	–	Harry Donovan	G	United States	Muhlenberg College
3	–	Ernie Vandeweghe	F/G	United States	Colgate

== Roster ==
New York Knicks 1949–50 roster
Players
Coaches

Pos.	#	Name	Ht.	Wt.	From
F	19	Edward Bartels	6 ft 5 in (1.96 m)	195 lb (88 kg)		NC State
F	12, 19	Vince Boryla	6 ft 5 in (1.96 m)	210 lb (95 kg)		Denver
G/F	4	Carl Braun	6 ft 5 in (1.96 m)	180 lb (82 kg)		Colgate
G	16	Harry Donovan	6 ft 2 in (1.88 m)	180 lb (82 kg)		Muhlenberg
F/C	11	Harry Gallatin	6 ft 6 in (1.98 m)	210 lb (95 kg)		Truman State
F	14	Gene James	6 ft 4 in (1.93 m)	180 lb (82 kg)		Marshall
G	7	Ray Lumpp	6 ft 1 in (1.85 m)	178 lb (81 kg)		NYU
G	15	Dick McGuire	6 ft 0 in (1.83 m)	180 lb (82 kg)		St. John's
F	5	Paul Noel	6 ft 4 in (1.93 m)	185 lb (84 kg)		Kentucky
G/F	10	Tex Ritter	6 ft 2 in (1.88 m)	185 lb (84 kg)		Eastern Kentucky
F/C	6	Connie Simmons	6 ft 8 in (2.03 m)	222 lb (101 kg)
G/F	17	Butch van Breda Kolff	6 ft 3 in (1.91 m)	185 lb (84 kg)		NYU
G/F	9	Ernie Vandeweghe	6 ft 3 in (1.91 m)	195 lb (88 kg)		Colgate

Head coach
- Joe Lapchick

Legend
- (DP) Unsigned draft pick
- (FA) Free agent
- (S) Suspended
- Injured

== Regular season ==
=== Season standings ===
Eastern Division	W	L	PCT	GB	Home	Road	Neutral	Div
x-Syracuse Nationals	51	13	.797	–	31–1	15–12	5–0	9–1
x-New York Knicks	40	28	.588	13	19–10	18–16	3–2	20–6
x-Washington Capitols	32	36	.471	21	21–13	10–20	1–3	13–13
x-Philadelphia Warriors	26	42	.382	25	15–15	8–23	3–4	9–17
Baltimore Bullets	25	43	.368	26	16–15	8–25	1–3	8–18
Boston Celtics	22	46	.324	29	12–14	5–28	5–4	11–15

=== Game log ===
1949–50 game log
#	Date	Opponent	Score	High points	Record
1	November 1	at Chicago	89–87 (OT)	Gallatin, McGuire (18)	1–0
2	November 2	at Waterloo	68–60	Vince Boryla (19)	2–0
3	November 3	at Fort Wayne	72–87	Harry Gallatin (13)	2–1
4	November 5	at Tri-Cities	76–72	Carl Braun (19)	3–1
5	November 6	at Sheboygan	93–99	Carl Braun (22)	3–2
6	November 8	at Indianapolis	79–64	Paul Noel (15)	4–2
7	November 10	Indianapolis	79–83	Connie Simmons (18)	4–3
8	November 12	at Rochester	73–94	Tex Ritter (14)	4–4
9	November 13	at Philadelphia	66–80	Harry Gallatin (18)	4–5
10	November 15	Syracuse	74–77	Vince Boryla (19)	4–6
11	November 18	vs Denver	85–78	Connie Simmons (15)	5–6
12	November 19	Philadelphia	85–69	Harry Gallatin (16)	6–6
13	November 22	at Washington	89–74	Carl Braun (19)	7–6
14	November 23	Washington	87–67	Carl Braun (17)	8–6
15	November 24	at Philadelphia	75–70	Donovan, McGuire (14)	9–6
16	November 26	Boston	96–84	Vince Boryla (20)	10–6
17	November 27	at Fort Wayne	77–72	Harry Gallatin (19)	11–6
18	November 30	at Minneapolis	92–102	Harry Gallatin (20)	11–7
19	December 1	at St. Louis	85–68	Tex Ritter (26)	12–7
20	December 3	Baltimore	85–55	Harry Gallatin (16)	13–7
21	December 8	at Baltimore	82–60	Vince Boryla (23)	14–7
22	December 10	Chicago	93–91 (OT)	Connie Simmons (21)	15–7
23	December 14	Minneapolis	94–84	Carl Braun (26)	16–7
24	December 17	St. Louis	81–76 (2OT)	Carl Braun (23)	17–7
25	December 19	at Anderson	86–83	Harry Gallatin (17)	18–7
26	December 20	at Chicago	77–79	Carl Braun (23)	18–8
27	December 21	at St. Louis	52–75	Carl Braun (11)	18–9
28	December 23	at Denver	83–72	Ernie Vandeweghe (19)	19–9
29	December 26	Rochester	80–83 (OT)	Connie Simmons (31)	19–10
30	December 27	at Boston	78–97	Carl Braun (15)	19–11
31	December 28	at Philadelphia	79–72	Braun, Gallatin (19)	20–11
32	December 31	at Washington	64–70	Carl Braun (17)	20–12
33	January 1	Philadelphia	81–59	Ernie Vandeweghe (16)	21–12
34	January 5	vs Waterloo	82–70	Connie Simmons (21)	22–12
35	January 7	Fort Wayne	80–88	Ernie Vandeweghe (20)	22–13
36	January 11	Washington	73–72	Harry Gallatin (18)	23–13
37	January 14	Boston	82–80	Carl Braun (21)	24–13
38	January 19	Minneapolis	83–94	Carl Braun (18)	24–14
39	January 22	Rochester	81–71	Carl Braun (23)	25–14
40	January 24	vs Sheboygan	101–68	Connie Simmons (19)	26–14
41	January 25	Fort Wayne	96–66	Harry Gallatin (22)	27–14
42	January 26	at Baltimore	79–77 (2OT)	Carl Braun (19)	28–14
43	January 28	Philadelphia	55–58	Dick McGuire (14)	28–15
44	January 29	at Fort Wayne	70–92	Ray Lumpp (16)	28–16
45	January 31	vs Tri-Cities	77–83	Carl Braun (16)	28–17
46	February 1	at Minneapolis	81–96	Harry Donovan (19)	28–18
47	February 2	at St. Louis	87–73	Carl Braun (18)	29–18
48	February 4	at Washington	76–71	Carl Braun (24)	30–18
49	February 5	Rochester	65–73	Braun, Simmons (13)	30–19
50	February 8	St. Louis	82–84 (2OT)	Ernie Vandeweghe (22)	30–20
51	February 11	Chicago	85–75	Vince Boryla (19)	31–20
52	February 15	Baltimore	80–67	Carl Braun (20)	32–20
53	February 18	Fort Wayne	80–84	Tex Ritter (16)	32–21
54	February 19	at Rochester	92–105	Connie Simmons (30)	32–22
55	February 21	at Philadelphia	84–73	Vince Boryla (16)	33–22
56	February 22	Washington	89–81	Carl Braun (38)	34–22
57	February 25	Chicago	86–79	Tex Ritter (13)	35–22
58	March 1	Baltimore	82–76	Harry Gallatin (16)	36–22
59	March 2	at Boston	81–72	Carl Braun (21)	37–22
60	March 4	Minneapolis	75–84	Carl Braun (22)	37–23
61	March 8	St. Louis	80–78 (OT)	Braun, Gallatin (20)	38–23
62	March 9	at Baltimore	79–91	Ray Lumpp (17)	38–24
63	March 11	vs Anderson	89–91	Carl Braun (36)	38–25
64	March 12	at Minneapolis	66–87	Carl Braun (17)	38–26
65	March 14	at Chicago	75–85	Carl Braun (24)	38–27
66	March 15	Boston	88–84 (OT)	Harry Gallatin (26)	39–27
67	March 17	at Boston	98–96 (2OT)	Carl Braun (20)	40–27
68	March 18	at Rochester	74–77	Harry Gallatin (17)	40–28

== Playoffs ==
1950 playoff game log
Division semifinals: 2–0 (home: 1–0; road: 1–0)

Game	Date	Team	Score	High points	High assists	Location	Series
1	March 21	@ Washington	W 90–87	Carl Braun (26)	Carl Braun (6)	Uline Arena	1–0
2	March 22	Washington	W 103–83	Harry Gallatin (20)	Dick McGuire (6)	Madison Square Garden III	2–0

Division finals: 1–2 (home: 1–0; road: 0–2)

Game	Date	Team	Score	High points	High assists	Location	Series
1	March 26	@ Syracuse	L 83–91 (OT)	Carl Braun (22)	Carl Braun (4)	State Fair Coliseum	0–1
2	March 30	Syracuse	W 80–76	Vince Boryla (21)	Dick McGuire (7)	Madison Square Garden III	1–1
3	April 2	@ Syracuse	L 80–91	Gallatin, Vandeweghe (17)	Dick McGuire (5)	State Fair Coliseum	1–2

1950 schedule
