= New York Knicks all-time roster =

List of basketball players

This is a list of players, both past and current, who appeared at least in one game for the New York Knicks NBA franchise.

== Players ==
Note: Statistics are correct through the end of the 2025–26 season.

G	Guard	G/F	Guard-forward	F	Forward	F/C	Forward-center	C	Center

legend
^	Denotes player who has been inducted to the Naismith Memorial Basketball Hall of Fame
*	Denotes player who has been selected for at least one All-Star Game with the New York Knicks and is currently on the team roster
^{+}	Denotes player who has been selected for at least one All-Star Game with the New York Knicks
^{x}	Denotes player who is currently on the New York Knicks roster
0.0	Denotes the New York Knicks statistics leader (min. 100 games played for the team for per-game statistics)

=== A to B ===
All-time roster
Player	Pos.	Pre-draft team	Yrs	Seasons	Statistics									Ref.
Player	Pos.	Pre-draft team	Yrs	Seasons	GP	MP	REB	AST	PTS	MPG	RPG	APG	PPG	Ref.
Precious Achiuwa	F/C	Memphis	2	2023–2025	106	2,357	668	108	751	22.2	6.3	1.0	7.1	
Don Ackerman	G	LIU Brooklyn	1	1953–1954	28	220	15	23	43	7.9	0.5	0.8	1.5	
Quincy Acy	F	Baylor	1	2014–2015	68	1,287	301	68	398	18.9	4.4	1.0	5.9	
Arron Afflalo	G	UCLA	1	2015–2016	71	2,371	266	144	909	33.4	3.7	2.0	12.8	
Henry Akin	F/C	Morehead State	1	1966–1967	50	453	120	25	192	9.1	2.4	0.5	3.8	
Cole Aldrich	C	Kansas	2	2013–2015	107	1,306	467	89	430	12.2	4.4	0.8	4.0	
Kadeem Allen	G	Arizona	2	2018–2020	29	533	60	97	239	18.4	2.1	3.3	8.2	
Jose Alvarado^{x}	G	Georgia Tech	1	2025–2026	28	474	57	106	186	16.9	2.0	3.8	6.6	
Lou Amundson	F	UNLV	2	2014–2016	70	1,062	297	77	300	15.2	4.2	1.1	4.3	
Bob Anderegg	F	Michigan State	1	1959–1960	33	373	69	29	133	11.3	2.1	0.9	4.0	
Eric Anderson	F	Indiana	2	1992–1994	27	83	31	5	42	3.1	1.1	0.2	1.6	
Shandon Anderson	G/F	Georgia	4	2001–2005	245	5,321	726	285	1,733	21.7	3.0	1.2	7.1	
Willie Anderson	G	Georgia	1	1995–1996	27	496	60	48	136	18.4	2.2	1.8	5.0	
Don Anielak	F	Missouri State	1	1954–1955	1	10	2	0	3	10.0	2.0	0.0	3.0	
Thanasis Antetokounmpo	F	Delaware 87ers	1	2015–2016	2	6	1	0	6	3.0	0.5	0.0	3.0	
Carmelo Anthony^	F	Syracuse	7	2010–2017	412	14,813	2,865	1,328	10,186	36.0	7.0	3.2	24.7	
Greg Anthony	G	UNLV	4	1991–1995	293	6,146	559	1,237	1,906	21.0	1.9	4.2	6.5	
OG Anunoby^{x}	F	Indiana	3	2023–2026	164	5,732	811	344	2,775	35.0	4.9	2.1	16.9	
Ryan Arcidiacono	G	Villanova	3	2021–2024	41	147	20	10	19	3.6	0.5	0.2	0.5	
Trevor Ariza	F	UCLA	2	2004–2006	116	2,091	379	131	633	18.0	3.3	1.1	5.5	
Dick Atha	G	Indiana State	1	1955–1956	25	288	42	32	93	11.5	1.7	1.3	3.7	
Jim Baechtold	F	Eastern Kentucky	4	1953–1957	257	6,363	790	531	2,462	24.8	3.1	2.1	9.6	
James Bailey	F	Rutgers	2	1984–1986	122	2,542	678	89	918	20.8	5.6	0.7	7.5	
Ron Baker	G	Wichita State	3	2016–2019	92	1,349	135	167	300	14.7	1.5	1.8	3.3	
Vin Baker	F	Hartford	2	2003–2005	41	504	107	21	146	12.3	2.6	0.5	3.6	
Renaldo Balkman	F	South Carolina	4	2006–2008; 2010–2012	150	2,149	539	89	603	14.3	3.6	0.6	4.0	
Ken Bannister	F/C	Saint Augustine's	2	1984–1986	145	2,809	652	81	1,110	19.4	4.5	0.6	7.7	
Andrea Bargnani	F/C	(Italy) Benetton Treviso	2	2013–2015	71	2,042	349	91	988	28.8	4.9	1.3	13.9	
Tom Barker	F/C	Hawaii	1	1978–1979	22	329	83	9	102	15.0	3.8	0.4	4.6	
Jim Barnes	F/C	UTEP	2	1964–1966	82	2,849	801	102	1,269	34.7	9.8	1.2	15.5	
Matt Barnes	F	UCLA	1	2005–2006	6	93	24	6	26	15.5	4.0	1.0	4.3	
Dick Barnett^ (#12)	G/F	Tennessee State	9	1965–1974	604	18,442	1,682	1,730	9,442	30.5	2.8	2.9	15.6	
Jim Barnett	G/F	Oregon	2	1974–1976	99	1,564	139	129	601	15.8	1.4	1.3	6.1	
RJ Barrett	G	Duke	5	2019–2024	297	9,873	1,580	832	5,374	33.2	5.3	2.8	18.1	
Earl Barron	C	Memphis	2	2009–2010; 2012–2013	8	269	95	10	93	33.6	11.9	1.3	11.6	
Edward Bartels	F	NC State	1	1949–1950	2			0	4			0.0	2.0	
Butch Beard	G	Louisville	4	1975–1979	216	4,595	704	675	1,641	21.3	3.3	3.1	7.6	
Michael Beasley	F	Kansas State	1	2017–2018	74	1,653	414	123	976	22.3	5.6	1.7	13.2	
MarJon Beauchamp	F	Yakima Valley	1	2024–2025	6	17	9	1	15	2.8	1.5	0.2	2.5	
Ron Behagen	F	Minnesota	1	1978–1979	5	38	11	2	12	7.6	2.2	0.4	2.4	
Dennis Bell	F	Drake	3	1973–1976	63	545	119	28	175	8.7	1.9	0.4	2.8	
Whitey Bell	G	NC State	2	1959–1961	36	494	94	56	183	13.7	2.6	1.6	5.1	
Walt Bellamy^	C	Indiana	4	1965–1969	268	9,925	3,562	664	5,072	37.0	13.3	2.5	18.9	
Jonathan Bender	F	Picayune Memorial HS (MS)	1	2009–2010	25	292	52	16	118	11.7	2.1	0.6	4.7	
Gary Bergen	C	Utah	1	1956–1957	6	40	8	1	8	6.7	1.3	0.2	1.3	
Henry Bibby	G	UCLA	3	1972–1975	168	2,337	302	260	1,149	13.9	1.8	1.5	6.8	
Mike Bibby	G	Arizona	1	2011–2012	39	557	59	80	103	14.3	1.5	2.1	2.6	
Chauncey Billups^	G	Colorado	1	2010–2011	21	664	65	116	368	31.6	3.1	5.5	17.5	
Jerry Bird	F	Kentucky	1	1958–1959	11	45	12	4	25	4.1	1.1	0.4	2.3	
Rolando Blackman	G	Kansas State	2	1992–1994	115	2,403	195	233	980	20.9	1.7	2.0	8.5	
George Blaney	G	Holy Cross	1	1961–1962	36	363	36	45	117	10.1	1.0	1.3	3.3	
Bojan Bogdanović	F	(Croatia) Cibona	1	2023–2024	29	557	58	26	303	19.2	2.0	0.9	10.4	
Etdrick Bohannon	F	Auburn Montgomery	1	1999–2000	2	5	1	0	3	2.5	0.5	0.0	1.5	
Anthony Bonner	F	Saint Louis	2	1993–1995	131	2,528	606	168	595	19.3	4.6	1.3	4.5	
Bob Boozer	F	Kansas State	2	1963–1965	129	3,791	1,022	171	1,992	29.4	7.9	1.3	15.4	
Vince Boryla^{+}	F	Denver	5	1949–1954	285	5,162	831	610	3,187	32.3	3.7	2.1	11.2	
Anthony Bowie	G/F	Oklahoma	1	1997–1998	27	224	26	11	75	8.3	1.0	0.4	2.8	
Nate Bowman	C	Wichita State	3	1967–1970	190	1,623	590	119	544	8.5	3.1	0.6	2.9	
Alex Bradley	F	Villanova	1	1981–1982	39	331	65	11	137	8.5	1.7	0.3	3.5	
Bill Bradley^ (#24)	G	Princeton	10	1967–1977	742	22,799	2,354	2,533	9,217	30.7	3.2	3.4	12.4	
Ignas Brazdeikis	F	Michigan	2	2019–2021	13	60	7	5	19	4.6	0.5	0.4	1.5	
Carl Braun^	G	Colgate	12	1947–1950; 1952–1961	740	17,995	2,072	2,821	10,449	31.6	3.6	3.8	14.1	
Pete Brennan	F	North Carolina	1	1958–1959	16	136	31	6	40	8.5	1.9	0.4	2.5	
Jamison Brewer	G	Auburn	1	2004–2005	18	185	22	12	31	10.3	1.2	0.7	1.7	
Ronnie Brewer	G/F	Arkansas	1	2012–2013	46	711	100	40	166	15.5	2.2	0.9	3.6	
Mikal Bridges^{x}	F	Villanova	2	2024–2026	164	5,728	571	610	2,625	34.9	3.5	3.7	16.0	
Aud Brindley	F	Dartmouth	1	1946–1947	12			1	34			0.1	2.8	
Scott Brooks	G	UC Irvine	1	1996–1997	38	251	18	29	57	6.6	0.5	0.8	1.5	
Charlie Brown Jr.	G	Saint Joseph's	1	2023–2024	8	37	2	0	6	4.6	0.3	0.0	0.8	
Derrick Brown	F	Xavier	1	2010–2011	8	88	15	4	34	11.0	1.9	0.5	4.3	
Shannon Brown	G	Michigan State	1	2013–2014	19	148	15	4	40	7.8	0.8	0.2	2.1	
Jalen Brunson*	G	Villanova	4	2022–2026	284	9,996	953	1,918	7,468	35.2	3.4	6.8	26.3	
Rick Brunson	G	Temple	3	1998–2001	69	450	49	75	108	6.5	0.7	1.1	1.6	
Em Bryant	G	DePaul	4	1964–1968	288	5,086	743	735	1,704	17.7	2.6	2.6	5.9	
Cleveland Buckner	F/C	Jackson State	2	1961–1963	68	723	240	44	411	10.6	3.5	0.6	6.0	
Dave Budd	F	Wake Forest	5	1960–1965	353	6,389	1,623	337	2,505	18.1	4.6	1.0	7.1	
Reggie Bullock	G	North Carolina	2	2019–2021	94	2,633	291	141	943	28.0	3.1	1.5	10.0	
Greg Bunch	F	Cal State Fullerton	1	1978–1979	12	97	17	4	28	8.1	1.4	0.3	2.3	
Dick Bunt	G	NYU	1	1952–1953	14	146	13	10	41	10.4	0.9	0.7	2.9	
Luther Burden	G	Utah	2	1976–1978	63	623	66	63	349	9.9	1.0	1.0	5.5	
Trey Burke	G	Michigan	2	2017–2019	69	1,474	133	264	849	21.4	1.9	3.8	12.3	
Alec Burks	G/F	Colorado	3	2020–2022; 2023–2024	153	3,884	664	366	1,716	25.4	4.3	2.4	11.2	
Ed Burton	F	Michigan State	1	1961–1962	8	28	5	1	15	3.5	0.6	0.1	1.9	
Donnis Butcher	G	Pikeville	3	1961–1964	141	2,090	326	255	729	14.8	2.3	1.8	5.2	
Al Butler	G	Niagara	3	1961–1964	204	4,836	662	514	2,192	23.7	3.2	2.5	10.7	
Greg Butler	C	Stanford	2	1988–1990	46	173	37	3	62	3.8	0.8	0.1	1.3	
Jackie Butler	F/C	Coastal Christian Academy (VA)	2	2004–2006	58	745	183	25	302	12.8	3.2	0.4	5.2	
Tommy Byrnes	G/F	Seton Hall	3	1946–1949	142			106	952			0.7	6.7	

=== C ===
All-time roster
Player	Pos.	Pre-draft team	Yrs	Seasons	Statistics									Ref.
Player	Pos.	Pre-draft team	Yrs	Seasons	GP	MP	REB	AST	PTS	MPG	RPG	APG	PPG	Ref.
José Calderón	G	(Spain) Tau Cerámica	2	2014–2016	114	3,294	353	496	926	28.9	3.1	4.4	8.1	
Jim Caldwell	C	Georgia Tech	1	1967–1968	2	7	1	1	0	3.5	0.5	0.5	0.0	
Marcus Camby	F/C	UMass	5	1998–2002; 2012–2013	221	5,877	1,839	160	2,053	26.6	8.3	0.7	9.3	
Tony Campbell	G/F	Ohio State	2	1992–1994	80	1,441	215	93	606	18.0	2.7	1.2	7.6	
Rick Carlisle	G	Virginia	1	1987–1988	26	204	13	32	74	7.8	0.5	1.2	2.8	
Anthony Carter	G	Hawaii	1	2010–2011	19	310	39	43	84	16.3	2.1	2.3	4.4	
Butch Carter	G	Indiana	2	1984–1986	74	1,310	98	170	553	17.7	1.3	2.3	7.5	
Reggie Carter	G	St. John's	2	1980–1982	135	1,459	164	206	471	10.8	1.2	1.5	3.5	
Bill Cartwright^{+}	C	San Francisco	8	1979–1984; 1985–1988	537	16,791	3,838	792	9,006	31.3	7.1	1.5	16.8	
Kelvin Cato	C	Iowa State	1	2006–2007	18	95	31	0	22	5.3	1.7	0.0	1.2	
Ron Cavenall	C	Texas Southern	1	1984–1985	53	653	166	19	78	12.3	3.1	0.4	1.5	
Tyson Chandler^{+}	C	Dominguez (CA)	3	2011–2014	183	5,887	1,844	177	1,868	32.2	10.1	1.0	10.2	
Wilson Chandler	F	DePaul	4	2007–2011	233	7,499	1,223	427	3,270	32.2	5.2	1.8	14.0	
Len Chappell^{+}	F/C	Wake Forest	3	1963–1966	167	3,689	1,034	124	1,953	22.1	6.2	0.7	11.7	
Maurice Cheeks^	G	West Texas A&M	2	1989–1991	107	2,900	246	586	836	27.1	2.3	5.5	7.8	
Chris Childs	G	Boise State	5	1996–2001	303	7,956	771	1,380	1,983	26.3	2.5	4.6	6.5	
Fred Christ	G	Fordham	1	1954–1955	6	48	8	7	20	8.0	1.3	1.2	3.3	
Doug Christie	G/F	Pepperdine	2	1994–1996	35	297	47	33	108	8.5	1.3	0.9	3.1	
Earl Clark	F	Louisville	1	2013–2014	9	70	16	2	23	7.8	1.8	0.2	2.6	
Jordan Clarkson^{x}	G	Missouri	1	2025–2026	72	1,279	127	96	622	17.8	1.8	1.3	8.6	
Jim Cleamons	G	Ohio State	3	1977–1980	180	4,653	456	699	1,338	25.9	2.5	3.9	7.4	
Barry Clemens	F	Ohio Wesleyan	1	1965–1966	70	877	183	67	376	12.5	2.6	1.0	5.4	
Nathaniel Clifton^	F/C	Xavier (LS)	7	1950–1957	476	12,934	4,066	1,291	4,919	31.5	8.5	2.7	10.3	
Bob Cluggish	C	Kentucky	1	1946–1947	54			22	238			0.4	4.4	
Fred Cofield	G	Eastern Michigan	1	1985–1986	45	469	46	82	165	10.4	1.0	1.8	3.7	
Mardy Collins	G	Temple	3	2006–2009	107	1,486	187	182	400	13.9	1.7	1.7	3.7	
Joe Colone	F	Bloomsburg	1	1948–1949	15			9	83			0.6	5.5	
Gene Conley	F/C	Washington State	2	1962–1964	116	2,095	625	91	822	18.1	5.4	0.8	7.1	
Bert Cook	G/F	Utah State	1	1954–1955	37	424	72	33	118	11.5	1.9	0.9	3.2	
Chris Copeland	F	Colorado	1	2012–2013	56	862	119	27	486	15.4	2.1	0.5	8.7	
Hollis Copeland	F	Rutgers	2	1979–1980; 1981–1982	93	1,260	161	89	464	13.5	1.7	1.0	5.0	
Freddie Crawford	G/F	St. Bonaventure	2	1966–1968	50	618	131	58	279	12.4	2.6	1.2	5.6	
Jamal Crawford	G	Michigan	5	2004–2009	299	11,023	864	1,308	5,269	36.9	2.9	4.4	17.6	
Joe Crawford	F	Kentucky	1	2008–2009	2	23	4	1	9	11.5	2.0	0.5	4.5	
Pat Cummings	F/C	Cincinnati	4	1984–1988	205	5,078	1,345	231	2,246	24.8	6.6	1.1	11.0	
Terry Cummings	F	DePaul	1	1997–1998	30	529	135	26	234	17.6	4.5	0.9	7.8	
Eddy Curry	C	Thornwood HS (IL)	5	2005–2010	222	6,318	1,295	119	3,367	28.5	5.8	0.5	15.2	

=== D ===
All-time roster
Player	Pos.	Pre-draft team	Yrs	Seasons	Statistics									Ref.
Player	Pos.	Pre-draft team	Yrs	Seasons	GP	MP	REB	AST	PTS	MPG	RPG	APG	PPG	Ref.
Pacôme Dadiet^{x}	G	(Germany) Ratiopharm Ulm	2	2024–2026	47	247	45	17	78	5.3	1.0	0.4	1.7	
Samuel Dalembert	C	Seton Hall	1	2014–2015	32	544	168	29	128	17.0	5.3	0.9	4.0	
Jesse Dark	G	VCU	1	1974–1975	47	401	37	30	170	8.5	0.8	0.6	3.6	
Antonio Davis	F/C	UTEP	1	2005–2006	36	749	172	14	181	20.8	4.8	0.4	5.0	
Baron Davis	G	UCLA	1	2011–2012	29	595	56	135	178	20.5	1.9	4.7	6.1	
Ben Davis	F	Arizona	2	1997–1999	15	34	17	3	21	2.3	1.1	0.2	1.4	
Hubert Davis	G	North Carolina	4	1992–1996	262	5,618	356	501	2,492	21.4	1.4	1.9	9.5	
Mel Davis	F	St. John's	4	1973–1977	156	1,820	623	117	712	11.7	4.0	0.8	4.6	
Mike Davis	F	Maryland	1	1982–1983	8	28	10	0	14	3.5	1.3	0.0	1.8	
Dave DeBusschere^ (#22)	F	Detroit Mercy	6	1968–1974	435	15,967	4,671	1,345	6,957	36.7	10.7	3.1	16.0	
Larry Demic	F	Arizona	3	1979–1982	206	3,192	805	106	976	15.5	3.9	0.5	4.7	
Dave Deutsch	G	Rochester	1	1966–1967	19	93	21	15	21	4.9	1.1	0.8	1.1	
Mamadi Diakite	F	Virginia	1	2023–2024	3	8	1	0	0	2.7	0.3	0.0	0.0	
Mohamed Diawara^{x}	F	(France) Cholet Basket	1	2025–2026	69	634	94	53	246	9.2	1.4	0.8	3.6	
Donte DiVincenzo	G	Villanova	1	2023–2024	81	2,360	297	216	1,259	29.1	3.7	2.7	15.5	
Michael Doleac	C	Utah	2	2002–2004	121	1,726	408	72	559	14.3	3.4	0.6	4.6	
James Donaldson	C	Washington State	1	1991–1992	14	81	19	2	12	5.8	1.4	0.1	0.9	
Billy Donovan	G	Providence	1	1987–1988	44	364	25	87	105	8.3	0.6	2.0	2.4	
Harry Donovan	G	Muhlenberg	1	1949–1950	45			38	253			0.8	5.6	
Damyean Dotson	G	Houston	4	2017–2020; 2021–2022	167	3,335	439	224	1,286	20.0	2.6	1.3	7.7	
Toney Douglas	G	Florida State	3	2009–2012	175	3,714	424	433	1,574	21.2	2.4	2.5	9.0	
Chris Dudley	C	Yale	3	1997–2000	144	2,002	604	33	327	13.9	4.2	0.2	2.3	
Bob Duffy	G	Colgate	1	1963–1964	4	50	6	5	16	12.5	1.5	1.3	4.0	
Chris Duhon	G	Duke	2	2008–2010	146	4,978	424	944	1,374	34.1	2.9	6.5	9.4	
Walter Dukes	C	Seton Hall	1	1955–1956	60	1,290	443	39	465	21.5	7.4	0.7	7.8	

=== E to F ===
All-time roster
Player	Pos.	Pre-draft team	Yrs	Seasons	Statistics									Ref.
Player	Pos.	Pre-draft team	Yrs	Seasons	GP	MP	REB	AST	PTS	MPG	RPG	APG	PPG	Ref.
Cleanthony Early	F	Wichita State	2	2014–2016	56	801	123	42	241	14.3	2.2	0.8	4.3	
Patrick Eddie	C	Ole Miss	1	1991–1992	4	13	1	0	4	3.3	0.3	0.0	1.0	
Johnny Egan	G	Providence	3	1963–1966	123	3,210	274	508	1,289	26.1	2.2	4.1	10.5	
Howard Eisley	G	Boston College	3	2001–2004	154	3,582	301	700	1,135	23.3	2.0	4.5	7.4	
Ray Ellefson	C	West Texas A&M	1	1950–1951	3		8	0	4		2.7	0.0	1.3	
Henry Ellenson	F	Marquette	1	2018–2019	17	234	57	15	102	13.8	3.4	0.9	6.0	
Wayne Ellington	G	North Carolina	1	2019–2020	36	558	65	44	183	15.5	1.8	1.2	5.1	
Len Elmore	F/C	Maryland	1	1983–1984	65	832	165	30	155	12.8	2.5	0.5	2.4	
Tosan Evbuomwan	F	Princeton	1	2025–2026	5	8	2	0	0	1.6	0.4	0.0	0.0	
Patrick Ewing^ (#33)	C	Georgetown	15	1985–2000	1,039	37,586	10,759	2,088	23,665	36.2	10.4	2.0	22.8	
Mike Farmer	F	San Francisco	3	1958–1961	141	3,087	702	123	929	21.9	5.0	0.9	6.6	
Ray Felix	C	LIU Brooklyn	6	1954–1960	376	8,831	3,426	253	4,499	23.5	9.1	0.7	12.0	
Raymond Felton	G	North Carolina	3	2010–2011; 2012–2014	187	6,404	585	1,225	2,501	34.2	3.1	6.6	13.4	
Eric Fernsten	F/C	San Francisco	1	1983–1984	32	402	86	11	83	12.6	2.7	0.3	2.6	
Landry Fields	F	Stanford	2	2010–2012	148	4,435	799	324	1,377	30.0	5.4	2.2	9.3	
Greg Fillmore	C	Cheyney	2	1970–1972	49	338	108	20	118	6.9	2.2	0.4	2.4	
Matt Fish	C	UNC Wilmington	1	1995–1996	2	17	3	1	12	8.5	1.5	0.5	6.0	
Bob Fitzgerald	F/C	Seton Hall	1	1946–1947	29			9	82			0.3	2.8	
Malachi Flynn	G	San Diego State	1	2023–2024	14	60	6	6	31	4.3	0.4	0.4	2.2	
Larry Fogle	G	Canisius	1	1975–1976	2	14	3	0	2	7.0	1.5	0.0	1.0	
Jack Foley	F	Holy Cross	1	1962–1963	6	37	9	5	21	6.2	1.5	0.8	3.5	
Evan Fournier	G/F	(France) Poitiers	3	2021–2024	110	2,856	263	210	1,302	26.0	2.4	1.9	11.8	
Steve Francis	G	Maryland	2	2005–2007	68	1,896	228	253	755	27.9	3.4	3.7	11.1	
Walt Frazier^ (#10)	G	Southern Illinois	10	1967–1977	759	28,995	4,598	4,791	14,617	38.2	6.1	6.3	19.3	
Jimmer Fredette	G	BYU	1	2015–2016	2	5	0	0	7	2.5	0.0	0.0	3.5	
Enes Freedom	C	Stoneridge Prep (CA)	2	2017–2019	115	2,958	1,241	189	1,614	25.7	10.8	1.6	14.0	
Frido Frey	F	LIU Brooklyn	1	1946–1947	23			14	88			0.6	3.8	
Larry Friend	G/F	California	1	1957–1958	44	569	106	47	175	12.9	2.4	1.1	4.0	
Channing Frye	F/C	Arizona	2	2005–2007	137	3,468	769	120	1,486	25.3	5.6	0.9	10.8	

=== G ===
All-time roster
Player	Pos.	Pre-draft team	Yrs	Seasons	Statistics									Ref.
Player	Pos.	Pre-draft team	Yrs	Seasons	GP	MP	REB	AST	PTS	MPG	RPG	APG	PPG	Ref.
Dan Gadzuric	C	UCLA	1	2011–2012	2	13	5	0	0	6.5	2.5	0.0	0.0	
Corey Gaines	G	Loyola Marymount	1	1993–1994	18	78	13	30	33	4.3	0.7	1.7	1.8	
Harry Gallatin^	F	Truman	9	1948–1957	610	13,823	5,935	1,122	7,771	32.6	12.1	1.8	12.7	
Danilo Gallinari	F	(Italy) Olimpia Milano	3	2008–2011	157	4,830	682	232	2,155	30.8	4.3	1.5	13.7	
Langston Galloway	G	Saint Joseph's	2	2014–2016	127	3,490	478	357	1,158	27.5	3.8	2.8	9.1	
Dick Garmaker	G/F	Minnesota	2	1959–1961	97	2,983	401	293	1,441	30.8	4.1	3.0	14.9	
Billy Garrett Jr.	G	DePaul	1	2018–2019	4	63	3	7	26	15.8	0.8	1.8	6.5	
Dick Garrett	G	Southern Illinois	1	1973–1974	25	239	26	14	74	9.6	1.0	0.6	3.0	
Jack George	G	La Salle	3	1958–1961	110	2,366	311	334	903	21.5	2.8	3.0	8.2	
John Gianelli	F/C	Pacific	5	1972–1977	303	7,698	1,912	406	2,481	25.4	6.3	1.3	8.2	
Taj Gibson	F/C	USC	4	2019–2022; 2023–2024	175	3,072	774	129	865	17.6	4.4	0.7	4.9	
J. R. Giddens	G	New Mexico	1	2009–2010	11	140	31	7	45	12.7	2.8	0.6	4.1	
Mike Glenn	G	Southern Illinois	3	1978–1981	232	3,477	236	329	1,696	15.0	1.0	1.4	7.3	
Tom Gola^	G/F	La Salle	4	1962–1966	277	6,858	1,446	893	2,161	24.8	5.2	3.2	7.8	
Glen Gondrezick	F	UNLV	2	1977–1979	147	2,619	674	189	722	17.8	4.6	1.3	4.9	
Leo Gottlieb	G	DeWitt Clinton HS (NY)	2	1946–1948	84			36	465			0.4	5.5	
Ronnie Grandison	F	New Orleans	2	1994–1996	8	65	18	4	20	8.1	2.3	0.5	2.5	
Stewart Granger	G	Villanova	1	1986–1987	15	166	17	27	49	11.1	1.1	1.8	3.3	
Gary Grant	G	Michigan	1	1995–1996	47	596	52	69	232	12.7	1.1	1.5	4.9	
Greg Grant	G	TCNJ	1	1990–1991	22	107	10	20	26	4.9	0.5	0.9	1.2	
Jerian Grant	G	Notre Dame	1	2015–2016	76	1,265	143	177	426	16.6	1.9	2.3	5.6	
Stuart Gray	F/C	UCLA	2	1989–1991	27	131	24	2	26	4.9	0.9	0.1	1.0	
Johnny Green^{+}	F/C	Michigan State	7	1959–1966	472	12,420	4,825	789	6,114	26.3	10.2	1.7	13.0	
Ken Green	F	UTPA	1	1985–1986	7	72	27	2	31	10.3	3.9	0.3	4.4	
Sidney Green	F/C	UNLV	2	1987–1989	164	3,326	1,036	169	1,159	20.3	6.3	1.0	7.1	
Chuck Grigsby	G	Dayton	1	1954–1955	7	45	11	7	16	6.4	1.6	1.0	2.3	
Quentin Grimes	G	Houston	3	2021–2024	162	3,817	411	246	1,401	23.6	2.5	1.5	8.6	
Ernie Grunfeld	G/F	Tennessee	4	1982–1986	298	5,004	641	468	1,680	16.8	2.2	1.6	5.6	
Richie Guerin^	G	Iona	8	1956–1964	518	18,257	3,309	2,725	10,392	35.2	6.4	5.3	20.1	

=== H ===
All-time roster
Player	Pos.	Pre-draft team	Yrs	Seasons	Statistics									Ref.
Player	Pos.	Pre-draft team	Yrs	Seasons	GP	MP	REB	AST	PTS	MPG	RPG	APG	PPG	Ref.
Tyler Hall	G/F	Montana State	1	2021–2022	1	2	0	0	0	2.0	0.0	0.0	0.0	
Penny Hardaway	G/F	Memphis	3	2003–2006	83	2,185	288	161	682	26.3	3.5	1.9	8.2	
Tim Hardaway Jr.	G	Michigan	4	2013–2015; 2017–2019	254	6,940	662	470	3,504	27.3	2.6	1.9	13.8	
Maurice Harkless	F	St. John's	1	2019–2020	12	286	40	20	82	23.8	3.3	1.7	6.8	
Jerry Harkness	G	Loyola (IL)	1	1963–1964	5	59	6	6	29	11.8	1.2	1.2	5.8	
Derek Harper	G	Illinois	3	1993–1996	216	6,920	482	1,046	2,534	32.0	2.2	4.8	11.7	
Jared Harper	G	Auburn	1	2020–2021	8	16	2	1	3	2.0	0.3	0.1	0.4	
Josh Harrellson	C	Kentucky	1	2011–2012	37	540	144	11	162	14.6	3.9	0.3	4.4	
Al Harrington	F	St. Patrick HS (NJ)	2	2008–2010	140	4,575	832	202	2,683	32.7	5.9	1.4	19.2	
Othella Harrington	F/C	Georgetown	4	2000–2004	237	4,833	1,101	148	1,612	20.4	4.6	0.6	6.8	
Josh Hart^{x}	G/F	Villanova	4	2022–2026	249	8,348	2,074	1,191	2,860	33.5	8.3	4.8	11.5	
Isaiah Hartenstein	C	(Lithuania) Žalgiris Kaunas	2	2022–2024	157	3,522	1,162	290	988	22.4	7.4	1.8	6.3	
Scott Hastings	F/C	Arkansas	1	1982–1983	21	98	31	1	23	4.7	1.5	0.0	1.1	
Spencer Haywood^	F/C	Detroit Mercy	4	1975–1979	210	6,701	1,806	324	3,587	31.9	8.6	1.5	17.1	
Herm Hedderick	G	Canisius	1	1954–1955	5	23	4	2	4	4.6	0.8	0.4	0.8	
Gerald Henderson	G	VCU	2	1986–1988	74	1,959	176	452	752	26.5	2.4	6.1	10.2	
Willy Hernangómez	C	(Spain) Sevilla	2	2016–2018	98	1,557	569	117	698	15.9	5.8	1.2	7.1	
Sidney Hertzberg	G	CCNY	2	1946–1948	63			38	520			0.6	8.3	
Art Heyman	G/F	Duke	2	1963–1965	130	2,899	397	335	1,469	22.3	3.1	2.6	11.3	
Mario Hezonja	G/F	(Spain) FC Barcelona	1	2018–2019	58	1,206	239	88	511	20.8	4.1	1.5	8.8	
Isaiah Hicks	F	North Carolina	2	2017–2019	21	272	48	18	92	13.0	2.3	0.9	4.4	
Jordan Hill	F/C	Arizona	1	2009–2010	24	252	61	7	97	10.5	2.5	0.3	4.0	
Paul Hoffman	G/F	Purdue	1	1954–1955										
Paul Hogue	C	Cincinnati	2	1962–1964	56	1,429	445	47	402	25.5	7.9	0.8	7.2	
Justin Holiday	F	Washington	1	2016–2017	82	1,639	225	102	629	20.0	2.7	1.2	7.7	
Dick Holub	C	LIU Brooklyn	1	1947–1948	48			37	504			0.8	10.5	
Tom Hoover	C	Villanova	2	1963–1965	83	1,141	389	48	319	13.7	4.7	0.6	3.8	
Bill Hosket Jr.	F/C	Ohio State	2	1968–1970	86	586	157	36	248	6.8	1.8	0.4	2.9	
Danuel House Jr.	F	Texas A&M	1	2021–2022	1	3	0	0	0	3.0	0.0	0.0	0.0	
Eddie House	G	Arizona State	1	2009–2010	18	371	40	37	115	20.6	2.2	2.1	6.4	
Allan Houston^{+}	G	Tennessee	9	1996–2005	602	21,724	1,847	1,476	11,165	36.1	3.1	2.5	18.5	
Larry Hughes	G	Saint Louis	2	2008–2010	56	1,507	175	169	576	26.9	3.1	3.0	10.3	
Ariel Hukporti^{x}	C	(Germany) Riesen Ludwigsburg	2	2024–2026	79	715	210	40	165	9.1	2.7	0.5	2.1	
Feron Hunt	F	SMU	1	2021–2022	2	8	1	1	0	4.0	0.5	0.5	0.0	
Geoff Huston	G	Texas Tech	1	1979–1980	71	923	58	159	219	13.0	0.8	2.2	3.1	
Mel Hutchins	F/C	BYU	1	1957–1958	18	384	86	34	126	21.3	4.8	1.9	7.0	

=== I to J ===
All-time roster
Player	Pos.	Pre-draft team	Yrs	Seasons	Statistics									Ref.
Player	Pos.	Pre-draft team	Yrs	Seasons	GP	MP	REB	AST	PTS	MPG	RPG	APG	PPG	Ref.
Darrall Imhoff	C	California	2	1960–1962	138	2,475	766	133	745	17.9	5.6	1.0	5.4	
Jarrett Jack	G	Georgia Tech	1	2017–2018	62	1,548	191	348	466	25.0	3.1	5.6	7.5	
Greg Jackson	G	Guilford	1	1974–1975	5	27	2	3	8	5.4	0.4	0.6	1.6	
Jermaine Jackson	G	Detroit Mercy	1	2004–2005	21	230	23	24	42	11.0	1.1	1.1	2.0	
Mark Jackson^{+}	G	St. John's	7	1987–1992; 2000–2002	500	15,363	1,986	4,005	5,544	30.7	4.0	8.0	11.1	
Phil Jackson^	F/C	North Dakota	10	1967–1969; 1970–1978	732	12,937	3,252	801	4,989	17.7	4.4	1.1	6.8	
Gene James	F	Marshall	3	1948–1951	46		4	29	97		0.7	0.6	2.1	
Jerome James	C	Florida A&M	4	2005–2009	90	694	163	15	223	7.7	1.8	0.2	2.5	
DaQuan Jeffries	G/F	Tulsa	1	2023–2024	17	46	5	5	14	2.7	0.3	0.3	0.8	
Jared Jeffries	F	Indiana	6	2006–2012	299	6,596	1,168	347	1,289	22.1	3.9	1.2	4.3	
Trey Jemison^{x}	C	UAB	1	2025–2026	13	82	18	5	13	6.3	1.4	0.4	1.0	
John Jenkins	G	Vanderbilt	1	2018–2019	22	319	36	21	115	14.5	1.6	1.0	5.2	
Brandon Jennings	G	Oak Hill Academy (VA)	1	2016–2017	58	1,428	152	287	496	24.6	2.6	4.9	8.6	
Chris Jent	F	Ohio State	1	1996–1997	3	10	1	1	6	3.3	0.3	0.3	2.0	
DeMarco Johnson	F	Charlotte	1	1999–2000	5	37	7	0	6	7.4	1.4	0.0	1.2	
DerMarr Johnson	F	Cincinnati	1	2003–2004	21	287	39	11	113	13.7	1.9	0.5	5.4	
Larry Johnson	F	UNLV	5	1996–2001	330	11,050	1,821	745	4,045	33.5	5.5	2.3	12.3	
Neil Johnson	F/C	Creighton	2	1966–1968	94	808	242	71	286	8.6	2.6	0.8	3.0	
Dillon Jones^{x}	F	Weber State	1	2025–2026	7	39	7	4	9	5.6	1.0	0.6	1.3	
Fred Jones	G/F	Oregon	1	2007–2008	70	1,757	170	166	532	25.1	2.4	2.4	7.6	
Solomon Jones	F	South Florida	1	2012–2013	2	26	3	0	0	13.0	1.5	0.0	0.0	
DeAndre Jordan	C	Texas A&M	1	2018–2019	19	493	216	57	207	25.9	11.4	3.0	10.9	
Jerome Jordan	C	Tulsa	1	2011–2012	21	108	27	4	42	5.1	1.3	0.2	2.0	
Phil Jordon	F/C	Whitworth	4	1956–1958; 1960–1962	128	3,285	790	237	1,388	25.7	6.2	1.9	10.8	

=== K to L ===
All-time roster
Player	Pos.	Pre-draft team	Yrs	Seasons	Statistics									Ref.
Player	Pos.	Pre-draft team	Yrs	Seasons	GP	MP	REB	AST	PTS	MPG	RPG	APG	PPG	Ref.
George Kaftan	F	Holy Cross	2	1950–1952	113	955	349	162	622	18.4	3.1	1.4	5.5	
Ralph Kaplowitz	G/F	NYU	1	1946–1947	27			25	194			0.9	7.2	
Trevor Keels	G	Duke	1	2022–2023	3	8	2	0	3	2.7	0.7	0.0	1.0	
Jason Kidd^	G	California	1	2012–2013	76	2,043	323	249	458	26.9	4.3	3.3	6.0	
Bo Kimble	G	Loyola Marymount	1	1992–1993	9	55	11	5	33	6.1	1.2	0.6	3.7	
Bernard King^	F	Tennessee	4	1982–1985; 1986–1987	206	7,151	1,069	582	5,458	34.7	5.2	2.8	26.5	
Doug Kistler	F	Duke	1	1961–1962	5	13	1	0	8	2.6	0.2	0.0	1.6	
Greg Kite	C	BYU	1	1994–1995	2	16	4	0	0	8.0	2.0	0.0	0.0	
Bob Knight	G/F	Weaver HS (CT)	1	1954–1955	2	29	1	8	7	14.5	0.5	4.0	3.5	
Toby Knight	F	Notre Dame	4	1977–1980; 1981–1982	283	7,331	1,444	335	3,640	25.9	5.1	1.2	12.9	
Travis Knight	C	UConn	3	2000–2003	126	972	219	27	187	7.7	1.7	0.2	1.5	
Lee Knorek	C	Detroit Mercy	3	1946–1949	130			206	873			1.6	6.7	
Kevin Knox II	F	Kentucky	4	2018–2022	195	3,899	602	165	1,592	20.0	3.1	0.8	8.2	
Tyler Kolek^{x}	G	Marquette	2	2024–2026	103	1,023	125	240	355	9.9	1.2	2.3	3.4	
Howard Komives	G	Bowling Green	5	1964–1969	335	9,768	922	1,474	3,993	29.2	2.8	4.4	11.9	
Luke Kornet	F	Vanderbilt	2	2017–2019	66	1,110	199	80	456	16.8	3.0	1.2	6.9	
Barry Kramer	G/F	NYU	1	1964–1965	19	231	41	15	84	12.2	2.2	0.8	4.4	
Ray Kuka	F	Notre Dame	2	1947–1949	52			38	253			0.7	4.9	
Mindaugas Kuzminskas	F	(Lithuania) Žalgiris Kaunas	2	2016–2018	69	1,018	126	69	425	14.8	1.8	1.0	6.2	
Marcus Landry	F	Wisconsin	1	2009–2010	17	108	19	0	44	6.4	1.1	0.0	2.6	
Andrew Lang	C	Arkansas	1	1999–2000	19	244	60	3	59	12.8	3.2	0.2	3.1	
Shane Larkin	G	Miami (FL)	1	2014–2015	76	1,865	176	226	470	24.5	2.3	3.0	6.2	
Tony Lavelli	F	Yale	1	1950–1951	30		59	23	99		2.0	0.8	3.3	
Mo Layton	G	USC	1	1976–1977	56	765	47	154	326	13.7	0.8	2.8	5.8	
Ricky Ledo	G	South Kent School (CT)	1	2014–2015	12	233	34	18	89	19.4	2.8	1.5	7.4	
Courtney Lee	G	Western Kentucky	3	2016–2019	165	4,929	510	375	1,804	29.9	3.1	2.3	10.9	
David Lee^{+}	F	Florida	5	2005–2010	368	11,059	3,529	711	4,775	30.1	9.6	1.9	13.0	
Jeremy Lin	G	Harvard	1	2011–2012	35	940	107	216	512	26.9	3.1	6.2	14.6	
Brad Lohaus	F/C	Iowa	1	1995–1996	23	325	31	27	90	14.1	1.3	1.2	3.9	
Luc Longley	C	New Mexico	1	2000–2001	25	301	66	7	49	12.0	2.6	0.3	2.0	
Robin Lopez	C	Stanford	1	2015–2016	82	2,219	602	114	842	27.1	7.3	1.4	10.3	
Jerry Lucas^	F/C	Ohio State	3	1971–1974	221	6,554	1,895	865	2,442	29.7	8.6	3.9	11.0	
Maurice Lucas	F/C	Marquette	1	1981–1982	80	2,671	903	179	1,263	33.4	11.3	2.2	15.8	
Ray Lumpp	G	NYU	5	1948–1953	214	1,416	272	377	1,508	20.8	2.1	1.8	7.0	

=== M ===
All-time roster
Player	Pos.	Pre-draft team	Yrs	Seasons	Statistics									Ref.
Player	Pos.	Pre-draft team	Yrs	Seasons	GP	MP	REB	AST	PTS	MPG	RPG	APG	PPG	Ref.
Rudy Macklin	G/F	LSU	1	1983–1984	8	65	11	3	35	8.1	1.4	0.4	4.4	
Frank Mangiapane	G	NYU	1	1946–1947	6			0	5			0.0	0.8	
Stephon Marbury	G	Georgia Tech	5	2003–2008	287	10,866	841	2,004	5,232	37.9	2.9	7.0	18.2	
Bill Martin	F	Georgetown	1	1986–1987	8	68	7	0	25	8.5	0.9	0.0	3.1	
Kenyon Martin	F	Cincinnati	2	2012–2014	50	1,064	229	58	266	21.3	4.6	1.2	5.3	
Slater Martin^	G	Texas	1	1956–1957	13	426	42	39	110	32.8	3.2	3.0	8.5	
Whitey Martin	G	St. Bonaventure	1	1961–1962	66	1,018	158	115	227	15.4	2.4	1.7	3.4	
Anthony Mason	F	Tennessee State	5	1991–1996	395	12,536	3,054	1,030	3,893	31.7	7.7	2.6	9.9	
Roger Mason Jr.	G	Virginia	1	2010–2011	26	319	43	20	75	12.3	1.7	0.8	2.9	
Eddie Mast	F/C	Temple	2	1970–1972	70	434	129	14	164	6.2	1.8	0.2	2.3	
Wesley Matthews	G	Marquette	1	2018–2019	2	54	3	5	14	27.0	1.5	2.5	7.0	
Don May	F	Dayton	2	1968–1970	85	798	166	52	300	9.4	2.0	0.6	3.5	
Ken Mayfield	G	Tuskegee	1	1975–1976	13	64	8	4	37	4.9	0.6	0.3	2.8	
Bob McAdoo^	F/C	North Carolina	3	1976–1979	171	6,807	2,051	566	4,560	39.8	12.0	3.3	26.7	
Miles McBride^{x}	G	West Virginia	5	2021–2026	277	5,133	453	520	1,975	18.5	1.6	1.9	7.1	
Brendan McCann	G	St. Bonaventure	3	1957–1960	41	331	50	65	74	8.1	1.2	1.6	1.8	
Walter McCarty	F	Kentucky	1	1996–1997	35	192	23	13	64	5.5	0.7	0.4	1.8	
Tim McCormick	C	Michigan	1	1991–1992	22	108	34	9	42	4.9	1.5	0.4	1.9	
Kevin McCullar Jr.^{x}	F	Kansas	2	2024–2026	25	184	36	22	56	7.4	1.4	0.9	2.2	
Xavier McDaniel	F	Wichita State	1	1991–1992	82	2,344	460	149	1,125	28.6	5.6	1.8	13.7	
Doug McDermott	F	Creighton	1	2017–2018	55	1,172	134	50	395	21.3	2.4	0.9	7.2	
Antonio McDyess	F	Alabama	1	2003–2004	18	421	119	20	152	23.4	6.6	1.1	8.4	
Mel McGaha	G	Arkansas	1	1948–1949	51			51	176			1.0	3.5	
Bill McGill	F/C	Utah	1	1963–1964	68	1,737	398	121	1,085	25.5	5.9	1.8	16.0	
Tracy McGrady^	G/F	MZCA (NC)	1	2009–2010	24	627	89	93	226	26.1	3.7	3.9	9.4	
Al McGuire^	G/F	St. John's	3	1951–1954	181	2,868	409	355	734	15.8	2.3	2.0	4.1	
Allie McGuire	G	Marquette	1	1973–1974	2	10	2	1	4	5.0	1.0	0.5	2.0	
Dick McGuire^ (#15)	G	St. John's	8	1949–1957	530	11,330	1,944	2,950	4,228	28.5	4.2	5.6	8.0	
Carlton McKinney	G	SMU	1	1991–1992	2	9	1	0	4	4.5	0.5	0.0	2.0	
Tom McMillen	F/C	Maryland	1	1976–1977	56	1,222	317	51	528	21.8	5.7	0.9	9.4	
Jim McMillian	F	Columbia	2	1976–1978	148	4,135	596	344	1,354	27.9	4.0	2.3	9.1	
Chris McNealy	F	San Jose State	3	1985–1988	108	1,864	494	110	466	17.3	4.6	1.0	4.3	
Bob McNeill	G	Saint Joseph's	1	1960–1961	75	1,387	123	238	437	18.5	1.6	3.2	5.8	
Dean Meminger	G	Marquette	4	1971–1974; 1976–1977	268	4,959	721	427	1,508	18.5	2.7	1.6	5.6	
Joe Meriweather	F/C	Southern Illinois	2	1978–1980	106	2,618	575	114	973	24.7	5.4	1.1	9.2	
Eddie Miles	G/F	Seattle	1	1971–1972	42	198	16	17	62	4.7	0.4	0.4	1.5	
Darko Miličić	F/C	(Serbia and Montenegro) Hemofarm	1	2009–2010	8	71	18	4	16	8.9	2.3	0.5	2.0	
Nat Militzok	F	Cornell	1	1946–1947	36			28	144			0.8	4.0	
Chris Mills	F	Arizona	1	1997–1998	80	2,183	408	133	776	27.3	5.1	1.7	9.7	
Shake Milton	G	SMU	1	2023–2024	6	27	6	4	11	4.5	1.0	0.7	1.8	
Wataru Misaka	G	Utah	1	1947–1948	3			0	7			0.0	2.3	
Nazr Mohammed	C	Kentucky	2	2003–2005	81	2,192	646	42	836	27.1	8.0	0.5	10.3	
Wayne Molis	F	Lewis	1	1966–1967	13	75	22	2	45	5.8	1.7	0.2	3.5	
Earl Monroe^ (#15)	G	Winston-Salem State	9	1971–1980	598	17,552	1,573	2,087	9,679	29.4	2.6	3.5	16.2	
Matt Mooney	G	Texas Tech	1	2021–2022	1	2	0	0	0	2.0	0.0	0.0	0.0	
Marcus Morris	F	Kansas	1	2019–2020	43	1,357	233	59	841	32.3	5.4	1.4	19.6	
Randolph Morris	C	Kentucky	2	2006–2008	23	225	46	3	60	9.8	2.0	0.1	2.6	
Timofey Mozgov	C	(Russia) Khimki	1	2010–2011	34	458	104	15	135	13.5	3.1	0.4	4.0	
Emmanuel Mudiay	G	(China) Guangdong Southern Tigers	2	2017–2019	81	2,100	254	313	1,067	25.9	3.1	3.9	13.2	
Bob Mullens	G	Fordham	1	1946–1947	26			18	76			0.7	2.9	
Dick Murphy	G	Manhattan	1	1946–1947	24			5	32			0.2	1.3	
John Murphy	F	Simon Gratz HS (PA)	1	1946–1947	9			0	24			0.0	2.7	
Toure' Murry	G/F	Wichita State	1	2013–2014	51	373	44	49	140	7.3	0.9	1.0	2.7	
Jerrod Mustaf	F/C	Maryland	1	1990–1991	62	825	169	36	268	13.3	2.7	0.6	4.3	
Dikembe Mutombo^	C	Georgetown	1	2003–2004	65	1,494	437	25	363	23.0	6.7	0.4	5.6	
Pete Myers	G/F	Little Rock	3	1988–1990; 1997–1998	62	478	61	84	141	7.7	1.0	1.4	2.3	
Sviatoslav Mykhailiuk	F	Kansas	1	2022–2023	13	40	7	1	21	3.1	0.5	0.1	1.6	

=== N to P ===
All-time roster
Player	Pos.	Pre-draft team	Yrs	Seasons	Statistics									Ref.
Player	Pos.	Pre-draft team	Yrs	Seasons	GP	MP	REB	AST	PTS	MPG	RPG	APG	PPG	Ref.
Lee Nailon	F	TCU	1	2002–2003	38	405	70	26	210	10.7	1.8	0.7	5.5	
Willie Naulls^{+}	F/C	UCLA	7	1956–1963	430	14,650	5,015	826	8,318	34.1	11.7	1.9	19.3	
Maurice Ndour	F	Ohio	1	2016–2017	32	331	64	8	98	10.3	2.0	0.3	3.1	
Mike Newlin	G/F	Utah	1	1981–1982	76	1,507	91	170	705	19.8	1.2	2.2	9.3	
Johnny Newman	G/F	Richmond	3	1987–1990	238	6,202	556	404	3,098	26.1	2.3	1.7	13.0	
Demetris Nichols	F	Syracuse	1	2008–2009	2	9	2	0	5	4.5	1.0	0.0	2.5	
Joakim Noah	C	Florida	2	2016–2018	53	1,055	417	107	244	19.9	7.9	2.0	4.6	
Paul Noel	F	Kentucky	3	1947–1950	141			103	525			0.7	3.7	
Nerlens Noel	F/C	Kentucky	2	2020–2022	89	2,109	549	69	409	23.7	6.2	0.8	4.6	
Bevo Nordmann	C	Saint Louis	2	1962–1964	33	835	256	40	312	25.3	7.8	1.2	9.5	
Moochie Norris	G	West Florida	2	2003–2005	68	767	77	107	236	11.3	1.1	1.6	3.5	
Steve Novak	F	Marquette	2	2011–2013	135	2,661	256	47	1,012	19.7	1.9	0.3	7.5	
Frank Ntilikina	G	(France) SIG Strasbourg	4	2017–2021	211	4,119	416	562	1,155	19.5	2.0	2.7	5.5	
Charles Oakley^{+}	F/C	Virginia Union	10	1988–1998	727	23,959	7,291	1,699	7,528	33.0	10.0	2.3	10.4	
Jawann Oldham	C	Seattle	1	1986–1987	44	776	179	19	173	17.6	4.1	0.4	3.9	
Kyle O'Quinn	F/C	Norfolk State	3	2015–2018	221	3,380	1,159	347	1,355	15.3	5.2	1.6	6.1	
Louis Orr	F	Syracuse	6	1982–1988	407	9,615	1,425	587	3,768	23.6	3.5	1.4	9.3	
Gerald Paddio	G/F	UNLV	1	1993–1994	3	8	0	0	4	2.7	0.0	0.0	1.3	
Bud Palmer	F/C	Princeton	3	1946–1949	148			187	1,737			1.3	11.7	
Jim Palmer	C	Dayton	2	1959–1961	109	1,770	457	83	724	16.2	4.2	0.8	6.6	
Charlie Paulk	F	Northeastern State	1	1971–1972	28	151	49	7	40	5.4	1.8	0.3	1.4	
Cameron Payne	G	Murray State	1	2024–2025	72	1,090	104	203	500	15.1	1.4	2.8	6.9	
Elfrid Payton	G	Louisiana	2	2019–2021	108	2,730	428	526	1,088	25.3	4.0	4.9	10.1	
Norvel Pelle	C	Price HS (CA)	1	2020–2021	9	52	11	1	11	5.8	1.2	0.1	1.2	
Bob Peterson	F	Oregon	2	1954–1956	95	1,282	377	75	464	13.5	4.0	0.8	4.9	
Theo Pinson	G/F	North Carolina	1	2020–2021	17	34	5	1	2	2.0	0.3	0.1	0.1	
Marshall Plumlee	C	Duke	1	2016–2017	21	170	51	10	40	8.1	2.4	0.5	1.9	
Ralph Polson	F/C	Whitworth	1	1952–1953	3	37	8	2	10	12.3	2.7	0.7	3.3	
Howard Porter	F/C	Villanova	1	1974–1975	17	133	38	2	33	7.8	2.2	0.1	1.9	
Bobby Portis	F/C	Arkansas	1	2019–2020	66	1,393	338	98	668	21.1	5.1	1.5	10.1	
Kristaps Porziņģis^{+}	F/C	(Spain) Sevilla	3	2015–2018	186	5,764	1,317	248	3,312	31.0	7.1	1.3	17.8	
Lavor Postell	G	St. John's	3	2000–2003	61	446	45	13	195	7.3	0.7	0.2	3.2	
Mike Price	G	Illinois	2	1970–1972	62	291	35	18	103	4.7	0.6	0.3	1.7	
Pablo Prigioni	G	(Argentina) Obras Sanitarias	3	2012–2015	187	3,341	352	568	728	17.9	1.9	3.0	3.9	

=== Q to R ===
All-time roster
Player	Pos.	Pre-draft team	Yrs	Seasons	Statistics									Ref.
Player	Pos.	Pre-draft team	Yrs	Seasons	GP	MP	REB	AST	PTS	MPG	RPG	APG	PPG	Ref.
Immanuel Quickley	G	Kentucky	4	2020–2024	253	6,109	798	755	3,272	24.1	3.2	3.0	12.9	
Brian Quinnett	F	Washington State	3	1989–1992	123	1,394	197	71	433	11.3	1.6	0.6	3.5	
Luther Rackley	C	Xavier	2	1971–1973	63	620	188	18	233	9.8	3.0	0.3	3.7	
Sherwin Raiken	G	Villanova	1	1952–1953	6	63	8	6	9	10.5	1.3	1.0	1.5	
Cal Ramsey	F	NYU	1	1959–1960	7	160	47	9	80	22.9	6.7	1.3	11.4	
Chasson Randle	G	Stanford	1	2016–2017	18	225	27	28	95	12.5	1.5	1.6	5.3	
Julius Randle^{+}	F	Kentucky	5	2019–2024	330	11,658	3,251	1,540	7,445	35.3	9.9	4.7	22.6	
Anthony Randolph	F	LSU	1	2010–2011	17	127	40	7	35	7.5	2.4	0.4	2.1	
Zach Randolph	F/C	Michigan State	2	2007–2009	80	2,632	847	155	1,443	32.9	10.6	1.9	18.0	
Andy Rautins	G	Syracuse	1	2010–2011	5	24	1	3	8	4.8	0.2	0.6	1.6	
Cam Reddish	G/F	Duke	2	2021–2023	35	653	52	30	259	18.7	1.5	0.9	7.4	
Willis Reed^ (#19)	F/C	Grambling State	10	1964–1974	650	23,073	8,414	1,186	12,183	35.5	12.9	1.8	18.7	
J. R. Reid	F	North Carolina	1	1995–1996	33	670	132	28	219	20.3	4.0	0.8	6.6	
Glen Rice	F	Michigan	1	2000–2001	75	2,212	307	89	899	29.5	4.1	1.2	12.0	
Micheal Ray Richardson^{+}	G	Montana	4	1978–1982	315	10,497	1,882	2,244	4,485	33.3	6.0	7.1	14.2	
Quentin Richardson	G	DePaul	5	2005–2009; 2012–2013	242	6,827	1,226	430	2,352	28.2	5.1	1.8	9.7	
Tom Riker	C	South Carolina	3	1972–1975	82	605	138	24	225	7.4	1.7	0.3	2.7	
Mike Riordan	G/F	Providence	4	1968–1972	221	3,427	421	370	1,149	15.5	1.9	1.7	5.2	
Tex Ritter	G/F	Eastern Kentucky	3	1948–1951	151		65	145	789		1.9	1.0	5.2	
Austin Rivers	G	Duke	1	2020–2021	21	442	47	42	154	21.0	2.2	2.0	7.3	
Doc Rivers	G	Marquette	3	1992–1995	99	2,432	240	513	766	24.6	2.4	5.2	7.7	
Anthony Roberson	G	Florida	1	2008–2009	23	253	15	19	107	11.0	0.7	0.8	4.7	
Larry Robinson	G/F	Centenary	1	2001–2002	2	10	2	0	3	5.0	1.0	0.0	1.5	
Mitchell Robinson^{x}	C	Chalmette HS (LS)	8	2018–2026	397	9,297	3,164	264	2,976	23.4	8.0	0.7	7.5	
Nate Robinson	G	Washington	5	2005–2010	312	7,725	903	862	3,897	24.8	2.9	2.8	12.5	
Truck Robinson	F/C	Tennessee State	3	1982–1985	148	4,596	1,211	242	1,475	31.1	8.2	1.6	10.0	
Sergio Rodríguez	G	(Spain) Estudiantes	1	2009–2010	27	531	39	91	200	19.7	1.4	3.4	7.4	
Phil Rollins	G	Louisville	1	1960–1961	40	659	85	101	233	16.5	2.1	2.5	5.8	
Derrick Rose	G	Memphis	4	2016–2017; 2020–2023	152	3,993	465	578	2,138	26.3	3.1	3.8	14.1	
Jalen Rose	G/F	Michigan	1	2005–2006	26	747	82	68	330	28.7	3.2	2.6	12.7	
Malik Rose	F	Drexel	5	2004–2009	230	3,196	682	188	928	13.9	3.0	0.8	4.0	
Hank Rosenstein	F	CCNY	1	1946–1947	31			19	133			0.6	4.3	
Irv Rothenberg	C	LIU Brooklyn	1	1948–1949	53			68	314			1.3	5.9	
John Rudd	F	McNeese State	1	1978–1979	58	723	167	35	184	12.5	2.9	0.6	3.2	
John Rudometkin	F	USC	3	1962–1965	109	1,290	320	56	690	11.8	2.9	0.5	6.3	
Campy Russell	F	Michigan	2	1980–1982	156	5,223	589	541	2,365	33.5	3.8	3.5	15.2	
Cazzie Russell	F	Michigan	5	1966–1971	344	8,256	1,262	709	4,584	24.0	3.7	2.1	13.3	

=== S ===
All-time roster
Player	Pos.	Pre-draft team	Yrs	Seasons	Statistics									Ref.
Player	Pos.	Pre-draft team	Yrs	Seasons	GP	MP	REB	AST	PTS	MPG	RPG	APG	PPG	Ref.
Cheikh Samb	C	(Spain) WTC Cornellá	1	2008–2009	2	8	2	0	0	4.0	1.0	0.0	0.0	
Bob Santini	F	Iona	1	1955–1956	4	23	3	1	11	5.8	0.8	0.3	2.8	
DeWayne Scales	F	LSU	2	1980–1982	47	508	137	10	218	10.8	2.9	0.2	4.6	
Fred Schaus	F	West Virginia	1	1953–1954	44	1,243	217	88	387	28.3	4.9	2.0	8.8	
Ossie Schectman	G	LIU Brooklyn	1	1946–1947	54			109	435			2.0	8.1	
Herb Scherer	C	LIU Brooklyn	1	1951–1952	12	167	26	6	47	13.9	2.2	0.5	3.9	
Dennis Scott	F	Georgia Tech	1	1998–1999	15	206	20	8	43	13.7	1.3	0.5	2.9	
Carey Scurry	F	LIU Brooklyn	1	1987–1988	4	8	3	1	2	2.0	0.8	0.3	0.5	
Ken Sears^{+}	F	Santa Clara	7	1955–1961; 1962–1963	424	13,622	3,909	746	6,854	32.1	9.2	1.8	16.2	
Wayne Selden Jr.	G/F	Kansas	1	2021–2022	3	19	1	1	5	6.3	0.3	0.3	1.7	
Frank Selvy	G	Furman	1	1958–1959	68	1,448	248	96	667	21.3	3.6	1.4	9.8	
Mouhamed Sene	C	(Belgium) Verviers-Pepinster	1	2008–2009	1	6	5	0	3	6.0	5.0	0.0	3.0	
Kevin Séraphin	F	(France) Cholet Basket	1	2015–2016	48	526	126	47	187	11.0	2.6	1.0	3.9	
Ramon Sessions	G	Nevada	1	2017–2018	13	167	18	27	48	12.8	1.4	2.1	3.7	
Landry Shamet^{x}	G	Wichita State	2	2024–2026	101	1,933	153	99	761	19.1	1.5	1.0	7.5	
Ronnie Shavlik	F	NC State	2	1956–1958	8	74	23	0	10	9.3	2.9	0.0	1.3	
Lonnie Shelton	F	Oregon State	2	1976–1978	164	4,423	1,213	344	2,174	27.0	7.4	2.1	13.3	
Ed Sherod	G	VCU	1	1982–1983	64	1,624	149	311	395	25.4	2.3	4.9	6.2	
Gene Short	F	Jackson State	1	1975–1976	27	185	41	8	71	6.9	1.5	0.3	2.6	
Dick Shrider	G	Ohio	1	1948–1949	4			2	1			0.5	0.3	
Gene Shue	G	Maryland	3	1954–1956; 1962–1963	206	4,920	547	516	1,825	23.9	2.7	2.5	8.9	
Iman Shumpert	G	Georgia Tech	4	2011–2015	202	5,288	711	446	1,587	26.2	3.5	2.2	7.9	
Alexey Shved	G	(Russia) CSKA Moscow	1	2014–2015	16	423	73	57	236	26.4	4.6	3.6	14.8	
Connie Simmons	F/C	Flushing HS (NY)	5	1949–1954	329	5,271	1,839	595	3,362	26.0	6.8	1.8	10.2	
Courtney Sims	C	Michigan	1	2008–2009	1	11	4	0	6	11.0	4.0	0.0	6.0	
Jericho Sims	C	Texas	4	2021–2025	177	2,374	687	93	424	13.4	3.9	0.5	2.4	
McKinley Singleton	G	UAB	1	1986–1987	2	10	0	1	4	5.0	0.0	0.5	2.0	
Dmytro Skapintsev	C	(Ukraine) Cherkaski Mavpy	1	2023–2024	2	2	0	0	0	1.0	0.0	0.0	0.0	
Bill Smith	G/F	Saint Peter's	1	1961–1962	9	83	16	7	23	9.2	1.8	0.8	2.6	
Charles Smith	F	Pittsburgh	4	1992–1996	241	6,317	1,081	341	2,719	26.2	4.5	1.4	11.3	
Chris Smith	G	Louisville	1	2013–2014	2	2	0	0	0	1.0	0.0	0.0	0.0	
Dennis Smith Jr.	G	NC State	3	2018–2021	58	1,165	138	215	504	20.1	2.4	3.7	8.7	
Ed Smith	F	Harvard	1	1953–1954	12	127	32	10	35	10.6	2.7	0.8	2.9	
J. R. Smith	G/F	Saint Benedict's Prep. (NJ)	4	2011–2015	213	6,685	915	602	3,214	31.4	4.3	2.8	15.1	
Jason Smith	F/C	Colorado State	1	2014–2015	82	1,785	324	140	656	21.8	4.0	1.7	8.0	
Randy Smith	G/F	Buffalo State	1	1981–1982	82	2,033	155	255	821	24.8	1.9	3.1	10.0	
Joe Smyth	F	Niagara	1	1953–1954	8	59	10	2	15	7.4	1.3	0.3	1.9	
Ron Sobieszczyk	G	DePaul	4	1956–1960	191	3,855	789	351	1,617	20.2	4.1	1.8	8.5	
Jeremy Sochan^{x}	F	Baylor	1	2025–2026	16	111	34	12	44	6.9	2.1	0.8	2.8	
Guy Sparrow	F	Detroit Mercy	2	1957–1959	116	2,268	648	114	1,050	19.6	5.6	1.0	9.1	
Rory Sparrow	G	Villanova	6	1982–1988	347	9,955	734	2,164	3,334	28.7	2.1	6.2	9.6	
Felton Spencer	C	Louisville	2	2000–2002	50	361	85	5	68	7.2	1.7	0.1	1.4	
Art Spoelstra	C	Western Kentucky	1	1957–1958	17	207	51	6	67	12.2	3.0	0.4	3.9	
Latrell Sprewell^{+}	G	Alabama	5	1998–2003	351	13,711	1,435	1,337	6,284	39.1	4.1	3.8	17.9	
Dave Stallworth	F/C	Wichita State	6	1965–1967; 1969–1972; 1974–1975	340	7,004	1,694	602	3,496	20.6	5.0	1.8	10.3	
John Starks	G	Oklahoma State	8	1990–1998	602	17,271	1,602	2,394	8,489	28.7	2.7	4.0	14.1	
Sam Stith	G	St. Bonaventure	1	1961–1962	32	440	51	60	141	13.8	1.6	1.9	4.4	
Tom Stith	F	St. Bonaventure	1	1962–1963	25	209	39	18	77	8.4	1.6	0.7	3.1	
Amar'e Stoudemire^	F/C	Cypress Creek HS (FL)	5	2010–2015	255	7,426	1,713	338	4,411	29.1	6.7	1.3	17.3	
Erick Strickland	G	Nebraska	1	2000–2001	28	421	52	29	120	15.0	1.9	1.0	4.3	
Rod Strickland	G	DePaul	2	1988–1990	132	2,377	286	538	1,150	18.0	2.2	4.1	8.7	
Stanley Stutz	G/F	Rhode Island	2	1946–1948	107			106	808			1.0	7.6	
Bruno Šundov	C	(Croatia) Split	2	2003–2005	22	77	13	3	27	3.5	0.6	0.1	1.2	
Dick Surhoff	F	LIU Brooklyn	1	1952–1953	26	187	25	9	45	7.2	1.0	0.3	1.7	
Michael Sweetney	F	Georgetown	2	2003–2005	119	2,003	575	58	830	16.8	4.8	0.5	7.0	

=== T to U ===
All-time roster
Player	Pos.	Pre-draft team	Yrs	Seasons	Statistics									Ref.
Player	Pos.	Pre-draft team	Yrs	Seasons	GP	MP	REB	AST	PTS	MPG	RPG	APG	PPG	Ref.
Sid Tanenbaum	G	NYU	2	1947–1949	56			108	499			1.9	8.9	
Maurice Taylor	F	Michigan	2	2004–2006	94	1,641	322	67	598	17.5	3.4	0.7	6.4	
Vince Taylor	G/F	Duke	1	1982–1983	31	321	36	41	95	10.4	1.2	1.3	3.1	
Kurt Thomas	F	TCU	8	1998–2005; 2012–2013	569	16,421	4,272	779	6,027	28.9	7.5	1.4	10.6	
Lance Thomas	F	Duke	5	2014–2019	264	5,457	685	208	1,592	20.7	2.6	0.8	6.0	
Tim Thomas	F	Villanova	3	2003–2005; 2008–2009	131	3,459	465	190	1,574	26.4	3.5	1.5	12.0	
Brooks Thompson	G	Oklahoma State	1	1997–1998	17	121	10	24	33	7.1	0.6	1.4	1.9	
Bob Thornton	F/C	UC Irvine	3	1985–1988	111	1,690	359	55	424	15.2	3.2	0.5	3.8	
Ray Tolbert	F	Indiana	1	1987–1988	11	177	35	5	47	16.1	3.2	0.5	4.3	
Sedric Toney	G	Dayton	1	1987–1988	21	139	8	24	57	6.6	0.4	1.1	2.7	
Jacob Toppin	F	Kentucky	2	2023–2025	25	87	18	7	19	3.5	0.7	0.3	0.8	
Obi Toppin	F	Dayton	3	2020–2023	201	2,963	593	172	1,398	14.7	3.0	0.9	7.0	
Karl-Anthony Towns*	C	Kentucky	2	2024–2026	147	4,839	1,809	448	3,263	32.9	12.3	3.0	22.2	
Allonzo Trier	G	Arizona	2	2018–2020	88	1,750	226	147	850	19.9	2.6	1.7	9.7	
Cezary Trybański	C	(Poland) Znicz Pruszków	1	2003–2004	3	5	0	0	1	1.7	0.0	0.0	0.3	
P. J. Tucker	F	Texas	1	2024–2025	3	58	8	0	9	19.3	2.7	0.0	3.0	
Trent Tucker	G	Minnesota	9	1982–1991	663	14,347	1,412	1,423	5,725	21.6	2.1	2.1	8.6	
Ronny Turiaf	F	Gonzaga	1	2010–2011	64	1,141	207	92	267	17.8	3.2	1.4	4.2	
Mirsad Türkcan	F	(Turkey) Efes Pilsen	1	1999–2000	7	25	10	1	4	3.6	1.4	0.1	0.6	
Jack Turner	G/F	Western Kentucky	1	1954–1955	65	922	154	77	282	14.2	2.4	1.2	4.3	
Jeremy Tyler	C	San Diego HS (CA)	1	2013–2014	41	398	109	8	146	9.7	2.7	0.2	3.6	
Charlie Tyra	F/C	Louisville	4	1957–1961	270	6,205	1,957	229	2,572	23.0	7.2	0.8	9.5	
Ime Udoka	F	Portland State	1	2005–2006	8	114	17	6	22	14.3	2.1	0.8	2.8	
Beno Udrih	G	(Italy) Olimpia Milano	1	2013–2014	31	588	57	110	173	19.0	1.8	3.5	5.6	

=== V to Z ===
All-time roster
Player	Pos.	Pre-draft team	Yrs	Seasons	Statistics									Ref.
Player	Pos.	Pre-draft team	Yrs	Seasons	GP	MP	REB	AST	PTS	MPG	RPG	APG	PPG	Ref.
Dick Van Arsdale	G/F	Indiana	3	1965–1968	236	7,529	1,355	661	3,019	31.9	5.7	2.8	12.8	
Butch van Breda Kolff	G/F	NYU	4	1946–1950	175			256	826			1.5	4.7	
Keith Van Horn	F	Utah	1	2003–2004	47	1,574	343	83	769	33.5	7.3	1.8	16.4	
Ernie Vandeweghe	G/F	Colgate	6	1949–1954; 1955–1956	224	3,600	834	548	2,135	26.1	4.6	2.4	9.5	
Kiki VanDeWeghe	F	UCLA	4	1988–1992	191	4,441	357	243	2,199	23.3	1.9	1.3	11.5	
Noah Vonleh	F	Indiana	1	2018–2019	68	1,722	528	129	571	25.3	7.8	1.9	8.4	
Sasha Vujačić	G	(Italy) Snaidero Udine	2	2015–2017	103	1,316	208	136	420	12.8	2.0	1.3	4.1	
Neal Walk	C	Florida	3	1974–1977	123	1,749	493	147	781	14.2	4.0	1.2	6.3	
Bill Walker	F	Kansas State	3	2009–2012	120	2,143	285	108	808	17.9	2.4	0.9	6.7	
Darrell Walker	G	Arkansas	3	1983–1986	245	5,836	665	1,029	2,585	23.8	2.7	4.2	10.6	
Kemba Walker	G	UConn	1	2021–2022	37	948	111	131	431	25.6	3.0	3.5	11.6	
Kenny Walker	F	Kentucky	5	1986–1991	351	7,387	1,457	259	2,720	21.0	4.2	0.7	7.7	
John Wallace	F	Syracuse	2	1996–1997; 1999–2000	128	1,585	290	59	717	12.4	2.3	0.5	5.6	
Charlie Ward	G	Florida State	10	1994–2004	580	13,295	1,561	2,451	3,753	22.9	2.7	4.2	6.5	
John Warren	G/F	St. John's	1	1969–1970	44	272	40	30	112	6.2	0.9	0.7	2.5	
Anton Watson	F	Gonzaga	1	2024–2025	9	22	3	2	8	2.4	0.3	0.2	0.9	
Travis Wear	F	UCLA	1	2014–2015	51	672	106	40	199	13.2	2.1	0.8	3.9	
Clarence Weatherspoon	F	Southern Miss	3	2001–2004	150	3,968	1,109	141	1,069	26.5	7.4	0.9	7.1	
Jake Weber	C	Purdue	1	1946–1947	11			1	20			0.1	1.8	
Marvin Webster	C	Morgan State	6	1978–1984	402	8,678	2,499	454	2,427	21.6	6.2	1.1	6.0	
Paul Westphal^	G	USC	2	1981–1983	98	2,429	137	539	1,008	24.8	1.4	5.5	10.3	
James White	G/F	Cincinnati	1	2012–2013	57	435	48	29	125	7.6	0.8	0.5	2.2	
Tony White	G	Tennessee	1	1987–1988	12	117	3	10	43	9.8	0.3	0.8	3.6	
Chris Wilcox	F	Maryland	1	2008–2009	25	330	82	14	135	13.2	3.3	0.6	5.4	
Eddie Lee Wilkins	F/C	Gardner-Webb	5	1984–1985; 1986–1987; 1988–1991	296	3,595	962	60	1,376	12.1	3.3	0.2	4.6	
Gerald Wilkins	G/F	Chattanooga	7	1985–1992	555	17,017	1,800	1,939	8,258	30.7	3.2	3.5	14.9	
Buck Williams	F/C	Maryland	2	1996–1998	115	2,234	580	74	667	19.4	5.0	0.6	5.8	
Derrick Williams	F	Arizona	1	2015–2016	80	1,435	296	75	746	17.9	3.7	0.9	9.3	
Frank Williams	G	Illinois	2	2002–2004	77	881	71	155	247	11.4	0.9	2.0	3.2	
Herb Williams	F/C	Ohio State	7	1992–1999	278	3,024	608	110	796	10.9	2.2	0.4	2.9	
Jerome Williams	F	Georgetown	1	2004–2005	79	1,211	283	41	359	15.3	3.6	0.5	4.5	
Milt Williams	G	Lincoln (MO)	1	1970–1971	5	13	0	2	4	2.6	0.0	0.4	0.8	
Monty Williams	F	Notre Dame	2	1994–1996	55	565	115	53	156	10.3	2.1	1.0	2.8	
Ray Williams	G	Minnesota	5	1977–1981; 1983–1984	399	11,474	1,500	2,260	6,555	28.8	3.8	5.7	16.4	
Shawne Williams	F	Memphis	1	2010–2011	64	1,323	239	47	454	20.7	3.7	0.7	7.1	
Shelden Williams	F	Duke	1	2010–2011	17	198	50	13	66	11.6	2.9	0.8	3.9	
Sly Williams	G/F	Rhode Island	4	1979–1983	252	5,438	1,054	491	2,788	21.6	4.2	1.9	11.1	
Troy Williams	F	Indiana	1	2017–2018	17	290	59	15	128	17.1	3.5	0.9	7.5	
Kennard Winchester	G/F	Averett	1	1991–1992	15	64	15	8	33	4.3	1.0	0.5	2.2	
Dylan Windler	G/F	Belmont	1	2023–2024	3	7	1	1	3	2.3	0.3	0.3	1.0	
David Wingate	G/F	Georgetown	2	1998–2000	27	124	10	8	16	4.6	0.4	0.3	0.6	
Harthorne Wingo	F	Friendship JC	4	1972–1976	212	2,814	745	128	1,023	13.3	3.5	0.6	4.8	
Qyntel Woods	F	Northeast Mississippi CC	1	2005–2006	49	1,013	190	47	329	20.7	3.9	1.0	6.7	
Mike Woodson	G/F	Indiana	1	1980–1981	81	949	97	75	380	11.7	1.2	0.9	4.7	
Metta World Peace	F	St. John's	1	2013–2014	29	388	59	17	139	13.4	2.0	0.6	4.8	
Brad Wright	F	UCLA	1	1986–1987	14	138	53	1	52	9.9	3.8	0.1	3.7	
Delon Wright	G	Utah	1	2024–2025	14	230	20	29	60	16.4	1.4	2.1	4.3	
Guerschon Yabusele	C	(France) Rouen Métropole	1	2025–2026	41	366	87	18	112	8.9	2.1	0.4	2.7	
Max Zaslofsky^{+}	G/F	St. John's	3	1950–1953	161	2,835	497	347	2,110	29.8	3.1	2.2	13.1	
