= 1953–54 New York Knicks season =

Season of National Basketball Association team the New York Knicks

- Division champions
- Head coach: Joe Lapchick
- General manager: Ned Irish
- Arena: Madison Square Garden

Results
- Record: 47–23 (.671)
- Place: Division: 1st (Eastern)
- Playoff finish: East Division Semifinals (Lost double Round Robin to Celtics and Nationals 0–4)
- Stats at Basketball Reference

Local media
- Television: WPIX
- Radio: WMGM

The 1953–54 New York Knickerbockers season was the eighth season for the team in the National Basketball Association (NBA). New York won its second straight regular season Eastern Division title with a 44–28 record, which placed them two games ahead of the Boston Celtics and Syracuse Nationals. The first round of the 1954 NBA Playoffs consisted of round-robin tournaments, where the top three teams in each division played each other in home and away matchups. The Knickerbockers went 0–4 against the Celtics and Nationals, and did not qualify for the Eastern Division Finals.

== NBA draft ==
Note: This is not an extensive list; it only covers the first and second rounds, and any other players picked by the franchise that played at least one game in the league.

Round	Pick	Player	Position	Nationality	School/Club team
T	–	Walter Dukes	C	United States	Seton Hall
2	8	Don Ackerman	G	United States	Long Island
2	14	Nield Gordon	F	United States	Furman
5	–	Bob Santini	F	United States	Iona
–	–	Richard Atha	G	United States	Indiana State University
–	–	Joe Smyth	F	United States	Niagara

== Regular season ==
=== Season standings ===
Eastern Division	W	L	PCT	GB	Home	Road	Neutral	Div
x-New York Knicks	44	28	.611	–	18–8	15–13	11–7	24–16
x-Boston Celtics	42	30	.583	2	17–6	10–19	15–5	25–15
x-Syracuse Nationals	42	30	.583	2	26–6	11–17	5–7	21–19
Philadelphia Warriors	29	43	.403	15	10–9	6–16	13–18	19–21
Baltimore Bullets	16	56	.222	28	12–18	0–22	4–16	11–29

x – clinched playoff spot

=== Game log ===
1953–54 Game log
#	Date	Opponent	Score	High points	Record
1	October 31	Minneapolis	67–91	Vince Boryla (15)	1–0
2	November 4	vs. Milwaukee	73–67	Vince Boryla (16)	2–0
3	November 6	@ Milwaukee	80–68	Carl Braun (21)	3–0
4	November 7	@ Minneapolis	62–70	Harry Gallatin (14)	3–1
5	November 8	@ Fort Wayne	75–70	Harry Gallatin (17)	4–1
6	November 12	Philadelphia	65–81	Harry Gallatin (21)	5–1
7	November 14	@ Baltimore	83–88	Carl Braun (16)	5–2
8	November 15	Baltimore	79–91	Connie Simmons (19)	6–2
9	November 18	vs. Philadelphia	83–88	Harry Gallatin (28)	7–2
10	November 19	vs. Baltimore	96–85	Carl Braun (28)	8–2
11	November 21	Syracuse	67–68	Nathaniel Clifton (20)	9–2
12	November 22	@ Syracuse	84–80 (OT)	Connie Simmons (27)	10–2
13	November 24	vs. Boston	103–92	Vince Boryla (20)	11–2
14	November 25	@ Boston	84–96	Vince Boryla (20)	11–3
15	November 28	Rochester	90–95 (OT)	Jim Baechtold (21)	12–3
16	November 29	@ Rochester	69–64	Harry Gallatin (18)	13–3
17	December 3	@ Philadelphia	74–79	Carl Braun (18)	13–4
18	December 5	Fort Wayne	92–73	Carl Braun (22)	13–5
19	December 10	Boston	113–108 (2OT)	Harry Gallatin (30)	13–6
20	December 11	@ Milwaukee	70–82	Harry Gallatin (19)	13–7
21	December 12	@ Minneapolis	67–71	Nathaniel Clifton (19)	13–8
22	December 13	@ Fort Wayne	69–68	Vince Boryla (23)	14–8
23	December 15	Minneapolis	79–80 (OT)	Carl Braun (29)	15–8
24	December 19	@ Baltimore	65–63	Harry Gallatin (15)	16–8
25	December 20	Baltimore	67–75	Carl Braun (19)	17–8
26	December 25	Syracuse	80–89	Carl Braun (21)	18–8
27	December 26	@ Rochester	78–77	Connie Simmons (18)	19–8
28	December 27	Philadelphia	76–79	Carl Braun (23)	20–8
29	December 30	@ Baltimore	79–86	Nathaniel Clifton (21)	20–9
30	December 31	Boston	95–74	Jim Baechtold (20)	20–10
31	January 2	@ Minneapolis	74–78	Carl Braun (18)	20–11
32	January 3	@ Fort Wayne	74–72	Boryla, Braun (18)	21–11
33	January 7	Baltimore	70–82	Jim Baechtold (23)	22–11
34	January 9	@ Rochester	88–87	Harry Gallatin (20)	23–11
35	January 10	Rochester	69–81	Harry Gallatin (21)	24–11
36	January 13	vs. Syracuse	93–72	Carl Braun (15)	24–12
37	January 14	@ Philadelphia	83–71	Carl Braun (20)	25–12
38	January 16	Fort Wayne	82–88 (OT)	Carl Braun (28)	26–12
39	January 17	@ Boston	87–84 (2OT)	Connie Simmons (23)	27–12
40	January 19	@ Milwaukee	78–75	Dick McGuire (16)	28–12
41	January 22	vs. Philadelphia	82–84	Harry Gallatin (16)	29–12
42	January 23	Milwaukee	63–75	Carl Braun (17)	30–12
43	January 24	vs. Milwaukee	66–68	Carl Braun (23)	30–13
44	January 26	vs. Rochester	71–74	Carl Braun (17)	31–13
45	January 28	@ Syracuse	66–79	Connie Simmons (18)	31–14
46	January 30	Syracuse	65–66	Nathaniel Clifton (22)	32–14
47	January 31	@ Syracuse	70–114	Baechtold, Braun, Clifton, McGuire (10)	32–15
48	February 3	vs. Minneapolis	79–91	Carl Braun (21)	32–16
49	February 4	vs. Syracuse	90–82	Carl Braun (35)	32–17
50	February 6	Baltimore	83–98	Carl Braun (19)	33–17
51	February 7	@ Boston	87–78	Harry Gallatin (19)	34–17
52	February 10	vs. Fort Wayne	73–69	Carl Braun (20)	35–17
53	February 11	vs. Boston	81–84 (OT)	Harry Gallatin (20)	35–18
54	February 13	Fort Wayne	79–73	Braun, Clifton (17)	35–19
55	February 14	@ Boston	89–103	Fred Schaus (23)	35–20
56	February 16	Boston	85–87	Dick McGuire (21)	36–20
57	February 17	@ Baltimore	80–84	Carl Braun (19)	36–21
58	February 18	@ Philadelphia	69–60	Fred Schaus (17)	37–21
59	February 20	Philadelphia	89–75	Nathaniel Clifton (19)	37–22
60	February 21	vs. Baltimore	85–76	Jim Baechtold (22)	38–22
61	February 23	Minneapolis	100–82	Nathaniel Clifton (20)	38–23
62	February 25	vs. Fort Wayne	62–82	Connie Simmons (15)	38–24
63	February 27	Milwaukee	58–57	Carl Braun (13)	38–25
64	February 28	vs. Philadelphia	83–78	Harry Gallatin (19)	38–26
65	March 2	Boston	71–86	Nathaniel Clifton (21)	39–26
66	March 3	vs. Philadelphia	79–88	Harry Gallatin (20)	40–26
67	March 5	vs. Rochester	66–70	Harry Gallatin (17)	41–26
68	March 7	Rochester	91–88	Carl Braun (25)	41–27
69	March 9	vs. Milwaukee	72–65	Harry Gallatin (15)	42–27
70	March 10	@ Minneapolis	85–76	Connie Simmons (27)	43–27
71	March 13	Syracuse	60–67	Harry Gallatin (16)	44–27
72	March 14	@ Syracuse	83–113	Connie Simmons (23)	44–28

== Playoffs ==
1954 playoff game log
Division Round Robin Semifinals: 0–4 (home: 0–2; road: 0–2)

Game	Date	Team	Score	High points	High rebounds	High assists	Location	Record
1	March 16	Boston	L 71–93	Carl Braun (18)	—	Simmons, Baechtold (3)	Madison Square Garden III	0–1
2	March 18	@ Syracuse	L 68–75	Harry Gallatin (15)	Harry Gallatin (20)	Jim Baechtold (5)	Onondaga War Memorial	0–2
3	March 20	@ Boston	L 78–79	Harry Gallatin (15)	—	Braun, Simmons (3)	Boston Garden	0–3
4	March 21	Syracuse	L 99–103	Carl Braun (32)	Nat Clifton (16)	Carl Braun (6)	Madison Square Garden III	0–4

1954 schedule

== Awards and records ==
- Harry Gallatin, All-NBA First Team
- Carl Braun, All-NBA Second Team
