= List of Winthrop Eagles men's basketball seasons =

The following is a list of Winthrop Eagles men's basketball seasons. The Eagles compete in the NCAA's Division I as a member of the Big South Conference. They have played their home games in the 6,100–seat Winthrop Coliseum since 1982. The Eagles are currently led by head coach Mark Prosser.

Winthrop's basketball program began in 1978 as a member of the National Association of Intercollegiate Athletics (NAIA). In 1985, the team made an immediate jump to the Big South Conference where they currently compete. In thirty years, Winthrop has won ten conference tournament championships as well as seven regular season championships, the most recent of which came in 2008. Most notably, the Eagles won the Big South Conference tournament in 2007 and subsequently upset the sixth-seeded Notre Dame Fighting Irish, 74–64, as the 11-seed in the first round of the 2007 NCAA Tournament. It was the Eagles' first and currently only NCAA tournament victory in program history.

== Seasons ==
Conference regular season champion^{†}	Conference tournament champion^{‡}	Postseason bid^{^}	Shared standing

Season	Head coach	Conference	Season results					Tournament results		Final poll	
Season	Head coach	Conference	Overall		Conference			Conference	Postseason	AP	Coaches'
Season	Head coach	Conference	Wins	Losses	Wins	Losses	Finish (Note: The Big South Conference used a divisional format from 2012 to 2014 and again in 2021 to 2022.)	Conference	Postseason	AP	Coaches'
Winthrop Eagles
1978–79	Nield Gordon	NAIA District 6	25	10			—	Final	—	—	—
1979–80	Nield Gordon	NAIA District 6	17	13			—	Quarterfinal	—	—	—
1980–81	Nield Gordon	NAIA District 6	31	8			—	Quarterfinal	—	—	—
1981–82	Nield Gordon	NAIA District 6	21	12			—	—	—	—	—
1982–83	Nield Gordon	NAIA District 6	14	21			—	—	—	—	—
1983–84	Nield Gordon	NAIA District 6	21	11			—	—	—	—	—
1984–85	Nield Gordon	NAIA District 6	11	16			—	—	—	—	—
1985–86	Nield Gordon	Big South	20	9	5	3	2nd	Semifinal	—	—	—
1986–87	Steve Vacendak	Big South	8	20	1	7	5th	Quarterfinal	—	—	—
1987–88	Steve Vacendak	Big South	17	13	5	7	4th	Champions^{‡}	—	—	—
1988–89	Steve Vacendak	Big South	16	13	5	7	6th	Semifinal	—	—	—
1989–90	Steve Vacendak	Big South	19	10	6	6	4th	Semifinal	—	—	—
1990–91	Steve Vacendak	Big South	8	20	5	9	5th	Quarterfinal	—	—	—
1991–92	Steve Vacendak	Big South	6	22	2	12	8th	Quarterfinal	—	—	—
1992–93	Dan Kenney	Big South	14	16	5	11	8th	Final	—	—	—
1993–94	Dan Kenney	Big South	4	23	3	15	9th	—	—	—	—
1994–95	Dan Kenney	Big South	7	20	4	12	8th	Quarterfinal	—	—	—
1995–96	Dan Kenney	Big South	7	19	6	8	6th	Quarterfinal	—	—	—
1996–97	Dan Kenney	Big South	12	15	5	9	7th	Quarterfinal	—	—	—
1997–98	Dan Kenney	Big South	7	20	4	8	6th	Quarterfinal	—	—	—
1998–99	Gregg Marshall	Big South	21	8	9	1	1st^{†}	Champions^{‡}	NCAA First Round^{^}	—	—
1999–00	Gregg Marshall	Big South	21	9	11	3	2nd	Champions^{‡}	NCAA First Round^{^}	—	—
2000–01	Gregg Marshall	Big South	18	13	11	3	2nd	Champions^{‡}	NCAA Opening Round^{^}	—	—
2001–02	Gregg Marshall	Big South	19	12	10	4	1st^{†}	Champions^{‡}	NCAA First Round^{^}	—	—
2002–03	Gregg Marshall	Big South	20	10	11	3	1st^{†}	Semifinal	—	—	—
2003–04	Gregg Marshall	Big South	16	12	10	6	4th	Quarterfinal	—	—	—
2004–05	Gregg Marshall	Big South	27	6	15	1	1st^{†}	Champions^{‡}	NCAA First Round^{^}	—	—
2005–06	Gregg Marshall	Big South	23	8	13	3	1st^{†}	Champions^{‡}	NCAA First Round^{^}	—	—
2006–07	Gregg Marshall	Big South	29	5	14	0	1st^{†}	Champions^{‡}	NCAA Second Round^{^}	22	22
2007–08	Randy Peele	Big South	22	12	10	4	2nd	Champions^{‡}	NCAA First Round^{^}	—	—
2008–09	Randy Peele	Big South	11	19	9	9	5th	Quarterfinal	—	—	—
2009–10	Randy Peele	Big South	19	14	12	6	3rd	Champions^{‡}	NCAA Opening Round^{^}	—	—
2010–11	Randy Peele	Big South	13	17	9	9	4th	Quarterfinal	—	—	—
2011–12	Randy Peele	Big South	12	20	8	10	6th	Semifinal	—	—	—
2012–13	Pat Kelsey	Big South	14	17	6	10	5th (South)	Quarterfinals	—	—	—
2013–14	Pat Kelsey	Big South	20	13	10	6	4th (South)	Final	—	—	—
2014–15	Pat Kelsey	Big South	19	13	12	6	5th	Final	—	—	—
2015–16	Pat Kelsey	Big South	23	9	13	5	T-1st^{†}	Final	—	—	—
2016–17	Pat Kelsey	Big South	26	7	15	3	T-1st^{†}	Champions^{‡}	NCAA First Round^{^}	—	—
2017–18	Pat Kelsey	Big South	19	12	12	6	T-2nd	Semifinals	—	—	—
2018–19	Pat Kelsey	Big South	18	12	10	6	T-3rd	Quarterfinals	—	—	—
2019–20	Pat Kelsey	Big South	24	10	15	3	T-1st^{†}	Champions^{‡}	NCAA Division I Canceled (Note: The 2020 NCAA tournament was canceled due to concerns over the COVID-19 pandemic.)	—	—
2020–21	Pat Kelsey	Big South	23	2	17	1	1st^{†}	Champions^{‡}	NCAA First Round^{^}	—	—
2021–22	Mark Prosser	Big South	23	9	14	2	1st (South)^{†}	Final	—	—	—
2022–23	Mark Prosser	Big South	15	17	10	8	T-4th	Quarterfinal	—	—	—
2023–24	Mark Prosser	Big South	17	15	8	8	4th	Quarterfinal	—	—	—
2024–25	Mark Prosser	Big South	23	11	11	5	T-2nd	Final	—	—	—
2025–26	Mark Prosser	Big South	23	11	13	3	2nd	Final	—	—	—

== Statistics ==
Statistics correct as of the end of the 2025–26 NCAA Division I men's basketball season

Coaches	Overall			Conference			Postseason		
Coaches	Wins	Losses	Win%	Wins	Losses	Win%	Wins	Losses	Win%
Nield Gordon	160	100	.615	5	3	.625			
Steve Vacendak	74	98	.430	24	48	.333			
Dan Kenney	51	113	.311	27	63	.300			
Gregg Marshall	194	83	.700	104	24	.813	1	7	.125
Randy Peele	77	82	.484	48	38	.558	0	2	.000
Pat Kelsey	186	95	.662	110	46	.705	0	2	.000
Mark Prosser	101	63	.616	54	26	.675			–
All-time record	843	637	.570	374	248	.601	1	11	.083
