= Frank Reddout =

American basketball player

Personal information
- Born: March 4, 1931 (age 95) Naples, New York, U.S.
- Listed height: 6 ft 5 in (1.96 m)
- Listed weight: 195 lb (88 kg)

Career information
- High school: Naples (Naples, New York)
- College: Syracuse (1950–1953)
- NBA draft: 1953: 3rd round, 20th overall pick
- Drafted by: Rochester Royals
- Position: Power forward
- Number: 21

Career history
- 1953: Rochester Royals
- Stats at NBA.com
- Stats at Basketball Reference

Franklin Parker Reddout (born March 4, 1931) is an American former professional basketball player. Reddout was selected in the 1953 NBA draft by the Rochester Royals after a collegiate career at Syracuse. He played in only seven games and totaled 13 points and 9 rebounds.

== Career statistics ==
Legend
GP	Games played	GS	Games started	MPG	Minutes per game
FG%	Field goal percentage	3P%	3-point field goal percentage	FT%	Free throw percentage
RPG	Rebounds per game	APG	Assists per game	SPG	Steals per game
BPG	Blocks per game	PPG	Points per game	**Bold**	Career high

=== NBA ===
==== Regular season ====
Year	Team	GP	MPG	FG%	FT%	RPG	APG	PPG
1953–54	Rochester	7	2.6	.833	.750	1.3	.0	1.9
