= Don Ackerman =

American basketball player (1930–2011)

Personal information
- Born: September 4, 1930 New York City, New York, U.S.
- Died: July 9, 2011 (aged 80) Oceanside, New York, U.S.
- Listed height: 6 ft 0 in (1.83 m)
- Listed weight: 183 lb (83 kg)

Career information
- High school: Metropolitan (Brooklyn, New York)
- College: LIU Brooklyn (1950–1951)
- NBA draft: 1953: 2nd round, 8th overall pick
- Drafted by: New York Knicks
- Playing career: 1952–1954
- Position: Point guard
- Number: 3

Career history
- 1952–1953: Manchester British-Americans
- 1953–1954: New York Knicks

Career NBA statistics
- Points: 43 (1.5 ppg)
- Rebounds: 15 (.5 rpg)
- Assists: 23 (.8 apg)
- Stats at NBA.com
- Stats at Basketball Reference

Donald D. Ackerman (September 4, 1930 – July 9, 2011) was an American professional basketball player. He was nicknamed "Buddy" and also known as "Douglas".

Ackerman played college basketball for the LIU Brooklyn Blackbirds during the 1950–51 season. He played for the Manchester British-Americans of the American Basketball League during the 1952–53 season. In 20 games for Manchester, Ackerman scored 247 points, a 12.4 game average. Ackerman was selected by the New York Knicks in the second round of the 1953 NBA draft and played in 28 games for the Knicks in the 1953–54 season. He was traded to the Boston Celtics at the end of the 1953–54 season but elected to end his playing career instead of moving his family to Boston. Ackerman started a landscaping business that he ran for more than 40 years.

Ackerman was married and had seven children. He lived in Oceanside, New York, at the time of his death.

== NBA career statistics ==
Legend
GP	Games played	GS	Games started	MPG	Minutes per game
FG%	Field goal percentage	3P%	3-point field goal percentage	FT%	Free throw percentage
RPG	Rebounds per game	APG	Assists per game	SPG	Steals per game
BPG	Blocks per game	PPG	Points per game	**Bold**	Career high

=== Regular season ===
Year	Team	GP	GS	MPG	FG%	3P%	FT%	RPG	APG	SPG	BPG	PPG
1953–54	New York	28	–	7.9	.222	–	.536	.5	.8	–	–	1.5
Career		28	–	7.9	.222	–	.536	.5	.8	–	–	1.5
