= 1953 NBA draft =

Basketball player selection

General information
- Sport: Basketball
- Date: April 24, 1953
- Location: Boston, Massachusetts
- Network: NBC

Overview
- 122 total selections in 19 rounds
- League: NBA
- Teams: 9
- Territorial picks: Ernie Beck, Philadelphia Warriors; Walter Dukes, New York Knicks; Larry Hennessy, Philadelphia Warriors
- First selection: Ray Felix, Baltimore Bullets
- Hall of Famers: 3: F Bob Houbregs; G Frank Ramsey; G Cliff Hagan

The 1953 NBA draft was the seventh annual draft of the National Basketball Association (NBA). The draft was held on April 24, 1953, before the 1953–54 season. In this draft, nine remaining NBA teams took turns selecting amateur U.S. college basketball players. In each round, the teams select in reverse order of their win–loss record in the previous season. The draft consisted of 19 rounds comprising 122 players selected.

== Draft selections and draftee career notes ==
Ray Felix from Long Island University was selected first overall by the Baltimore Bullets and went on to win the Rookie of the Year Award in his first season. Ernie Beck and Walter Dukes were selected before the draft as Philadelphia Warriors' and New York Knicks' territorial picks respectively. Three players from this draft, Bob Houbregs, Frank Ramsey and Cliff Hagan, have been inducted to the Basketball Hall of Fame.

== Key ==
Pos.	G	F	C
Position	Guard	Forward	Center

^	Denotes player who has been inducted to the Naismith Memorial Basketball Hall of Fame
*	Denotes player who has been selected for at least one All-Star Game and All-NBA Team
^{+}	Denotes player who has been selected for at least one All-Star Game
^{#}	Denotes player who has never appeared in an NBA regular-season or playoff game
^{~}	Denotes player who has been selected as Rookie of the Year

== Draft ==
Round	Pick	Player	Position	Nationality	Team	College
T	–	Ernie Beck	G/F	United States	Philadelphia Warriors	Pennsylvania
T	–	Walter Dukes^{+}	C	United States	New York Knicks	Seton Hall
T	–	Larry Hennessy	G	United States	Philadelphia Warriors	Villanova
1	1	Ray Felix^{+}^{~}	C	United States	Baltimore Bullets	Manchester British-Americans (ABL)
1	2	Bob Houbregs^	F/C	Canada	Milwaukee Hawks	Washington
1	3	Jack Molinas^{+}	F	United States	Fort Wayne Pistons	Columbia
1	4	Richie Regan^{+}	G	United States	Rochester Royals	Seton Hall
1	5	Frank Ramsey^	G/F	United States	Boston Celtics	Kentucky
1	6	Jim Neal	C	United States	Syracuse Nationals	Wofford
1	7	Jim Fritsche	F/C	United States	Minneapolis Lakers	Hamline
2	8	Don Ackerman	G	United States	New York Knicks (from Baltimore)	Manchester British-Americans (ABL)
2	9	Bobby Speight^{#}	F/C	United States	Baltimore Bullets (from Milwaukee)	NC State
2	10	George Glasgow^{#}	G	United States	Fort Wayne Pistons	Fairleigh Dickinson
2	11	Norm Swanson	F	United States	Rochester Royals	Detroit
2	12	Chet Noe^{#}	F/C	United States	Boston Celtics	Oregon
2	13	Dick Knostman	C	United States	Syracuse Nationals	Kansas State
2	14	Nield Gordon^{#}	F	United States	New York Knicks	Furman
2	15	Ron Feiereisel	G	United States	Minneapolis Lakers	DePaul

== Other picks ==
The following list includes other draft picks who have appeared in at least one NBA game.

Round	Pick	Player	Position	Nationality	Team	College
3	16	Norm Grekin	F	United States	Philadelphia Warriors	La Salle
3	17	Bob Peterson	F	United States	Baltimore Bullets	Oregon
3	18	Irv Bemoras	G/F	United States	Milwaukee Hawks	Illinois
3	20	Frank Reddout	F	United States	Rochester Royals	Syracuse
3	21	Cliff Hagan^	G/F	United States	Boston Celtics	Kentucky
3	22	Billy Kenville	G/F	United States	Syracuse Nationals	St. Bonaventure
5	35	Paul Nolen	C	United States	Baltimore Bullets	Texas Tech
5	36	Gene Dyker	F	United States	Milwaukee Hawks	DePaul
5	41	Bob Santini	F	United States	New York Knicks	Iona
6	50	Richard Atha	G	United States	New York Knicks	Indiana State
7	58	Lou Tsioropoulos	F	United States	Boston Celtics	Kentucky
8	63	Connie Rea	G/F	United States	Baltimore Bullets	Centenary
9	77	Joe Smyth	F	United States	New York Knicks	Niagara
11	89	Bill Bolger	F	United States	Milwaukee Hawks	Georgetown
13	102	Jack George*	G	United States	Philadelphia Warriors	La Salle
14	108	Ken Sears^{+}	F	United States	Rochester Royals	Santa Clara

== Notable undrafted players ==
These players were not selected in the 1953 draft but played at least one game in the NBA.

Player	Pos.	Nationality	School/club team
Andy Johnson	F	United States	Portland
Jim Mooney	F	United States	Villanova
Hal Uplinger	G	United States	LIU Brooklyn

== See also ==
- List of first overall NBA draft picks
