= Fred Christ =

American basketball player

Personal information
- Born: August 6, 1930 (age 96) Queens, New York, U.S.
- Listed height: 6 ft 4 in (1.93 m)
- Listed weight: 210 lb (95 kg)

Career information
- High school: St. Francis (Queens, New York)
- College: Fordham (1949–1952)
- NBA draft: 1952: undrafted
- Playing career: 1954–1955
- Position: Shooting guard
- Number: 9

Career history
- 1954: New York Knicks

Career statistics
- Points: 20
- Rebounds: 8
- Assists: 7
- Stats at NBA.com
- Stats at Basketball Reference

Frederick L. Christ (born August 6, 1930) is an American former basketball player. He played collegiately for Fordham University.

He played in six games for the New York Knicks (1954–55) in the NBA.

== Career statistics ==
Legend
GP	Games played	GS	Games started	MPG	Minutes per game
FG%	Field goal percentage	3P%	3-point field goal percentage	FT%	Free throw percentage
RPG	Rebounds per game	APG	Assists per game	SPG	Steals per game
BPG	Blocks per game	PPG	Points per game	**Bold**	Career high

=== NBA ===
==== Regular season ====
Year	Team	GP	MPG	FG%	FT%	RPG	APG	PPG
1954–55	New York	6	8.0	.278	.909	1.3	1.2	3.3
