= Joe Smyth (basketball) =

American basketball player

Personal information
- Born: May 22, 1929 New York City, New York, U.S.
- Died: June 10, 1999 (aged 70)
- Listed height: 6 ft 3 in (1.91 m)
- Listed weight: 215 lb (98 kg)

Career information
- College: Niagara (1948–1951)
- NBA draft: 1953: 9th round, 77th overall pick
- Drafted by: New York Knicks
- Position: Small forward
- Number: 17

Career history
- 1953–1954: New York Knicks
- 1954: Baltimore Bullets
- Stats at NBA.com
- Stats at Basketball Reference

Joseph George Smyth (May 22, 1929 – June 10, 1999) was an American National Basketball Association (NBA) player. He was drafted with the seventy-seventh overall pick in the ninth round of the 1953 NBA draft by the New York Knicks. He made his NBA debut on December 30, 1953, for the Knicks and played eight games with them. Joe finished the 1953-54 NBA season with the Baltimore Bullets averaging career totals of 3.3 points and 2.5 rebounds per game.

== Career statistics ==
Legend
GP	Games played	GS	Games started	MPG	Minutes per game
FG%	Field goal percentage	3P%	3-point field goal percentage	FT%	Free throw percentage
RPG	Rebounds per game	APG	Assists per game	SPG	Steals per game
BPG	Blocks per game	PPG	Points per game	**Bold**	Career high

=== NBA ===
==== Regular season ====
Year	Team	GP	MPG	FG%	FT%	RPG	APG	PPG
1953–54	New York	8	7.4	.333	**.556**	1.3	.3	1.9
1953–54	Baltimore	**32**	**13.6**	**.350**	.536	**2.8**	**1.5**	**3.6**
Career		40	12.4	.348	.538	2.5	1.2	3.3
