= Jim Baechtold =

American basketball player and academic

Personal information
- Born: December 9, 1927 McKeesport, Pennsylvania, U.S.
- Died: August 29, 2011 (aged 83) Richmond, Kentucky, U.S.
- Listed height: 6 ft 4 in (1.93 m)
- Listed weight: 205 lb (93 kg)

Career information
- High school: Moon (Coraopolis, Pennsylvania)
- College: Eastern Kentucky (1948–1952)
- NBA draft: 1952: 1st round, 2nd overall pick
- Drafted by: Baltimore Bullets
- Playing career: 1952–1957
- Position: Forward / guard
- Number: 18, 10

Career history
- 1952–1953: Baltimore Bullets
- 1953: Elmira Colonels
- 1953–1957: New York Knicks

Career NBA statistics
- Points: 3,123 (9.7 ppg)
- Rebounds: 1,009 (3.1 rpg)
- Assists: 685 (2.1 apg)
- Stats at NBA.com
- Stats at Basketball Reference

James Edward Baechtold (December 9, 1927 – August 29, 2011) was an American basketball player and professor at Eastern Kentucky University.

== Basketball career ==
A graduate of Moon High School in Coraopolis, Pennsylvania, Baechtold played collegiately for Eastern Kentucky University (1948–1952).

Baechtold was selected by the Baltimore Bullets in the 1st round (2nd pick overall) of the 1952 NBA draft.

He played for the Bullets (1952–53) and New York Knicks (1953–57) in the NBA for 321 games, averaging 9.7 points and 3.1 rebounds.

From 1962 through 1966, Baechtold served as Eastern Kentucky University’s head basketball coach. In his five seasons, he coached two OVC runners-up and the 1965 conference championship team. He was the OVC Coach-of-the-Year in 1965. Afterwards, he served for several years as an associate professor in the university's Parks and Recreation Department.

== Career playing statistics ==
Legend
GP	Games played	GS	Games started	MPG	Minutes per game
FG%	Field goal percentage	3P%	3-point field goal percentage	FT%	Free throw percentage
RPG	Rebounds per game	APG	Assists per game	SPG	Steals per game
BPG	Blocks per game	PPG	Points per game	**Bold**	Career high

=== NBA ===
==== Regular season ====
Year	Team	GP	MPG	FG%	FT%	RPG	APG	PPG
1952–53	Baltimore	64	29.6	.390	.738	3.4	2.4	10.8
1953–54	New York	70	23.2	.366	.757	2.6	1.7	6.8
1954–55	New York	**72**	**35.2**	**.403**	**.823**	**4.3**	**3.0**	**13.9**
1955–56	New York	70	24.8	.386	.801	3.1	2.3	11.0
1956–57	New York	45	10.3	.381	.750	1.8	.7	4.8
Career		321	25.7	.388	.783	3.1	2.1	9.7

==== Playoffs ====
Year	Team	GP	MPG	FG%	FT%	RPG	APG	PPG
1953	Baltimore	2	**43.0**	**.533**	.545	4.0	**5.5**	**19.0**
1954	New York	4	26.5	.414	.846	2.5	2.8	8.8
1955	New York	3	38.3	.378	**.933**	**4.7**	4.7	16.0
Career		9	34.1	.433	.795	3.6	4.0	13.4
