= Don Anielak =

American basketball player (1930–1995)

Personal information
- Born: November 1, 1930 St. Louis, Missouri, U.S.
- Died: November 19, 1995 (aged 65)
- Listed height: 6 ft 7 in (2.01 m)
- Listed weight: 190 lb (86 kg)

Career information
- High school: Bland (Bland, Missouri)
- College: Moberly Area CC (1949–1951); Missouri State (1952–1954)
- NBA draft: 1954: 3rd round, 26th overall pick
- Drafted by: New York Knicks
- Playing career: 1954–1955
- Position: Forward
- Number: 12

Career history
- 1954: New York Knicks

Career highlights
- NAIA Tournament champion (1953); All-MIAA (1953)
- Stats at NBA.com
- Stats at Basketball Reference

Donald Robert Anielak (November 1, 1930 – November 19, 1995) was an American professional basketball player and a high school coach. He starred at Southwest Missouri State University before playing professionally for the New York Knicks in 1954.

== College career ==
Anielak played collegiately for two seasons at Moberly Junior College before transferring to Southwest Missouri State University where he played from 1952 to 1954. He originally signed on to play with Bradley, but left the school shortly before the first game of the 1951 season. In January 1953, he set the schools then single-game scoring record with 39 points at Northeast Missouri. A month later he scored 38 points against Warrensburg. He was a MIAA All-Conference selection in 1953 after leading the conference in scoring with 21.9 points per game. He won the NAIA championship the same season and was a member of the NAIA All-Tournament team that year. His total of 888 points remained a school record for a player in a two-year career until 1974.

In 1989, Southwest Missouri State inducted Anielak into their Athletics Hall of Fame.

== Professional career ==
After college, Anielak was selected by the New York Knicks in the third round (26th overall) of the 1954 NBA draft and signed with the team in August 1954. He appeared in one regular season game for the Knicks, scoring three points, before being waived in November 1954.

== Later life ==
After his playing career ended, Anielak became a high school coach, first at St. Peter's High in St. Charles. He later coached at Ramsey Illinois where he accumulated a 56–18 record in three seasons before moving to Williamsville where he posted a 134–55 record in nine seasons. In 1972, he was hired as the head coach Koshkonong High School in Missouri and in 1974 he moved to North Boone High School in Illinois.

== Career statistics ==
Legend
GP	Games played	GS	Games started	MPG	Minutes per game
FG%	Field goal percentage	3P%	3-point field goal percentage	FT%	Free throw percentage
RPG	Rebounds per game	APG	Assists per game	SPG	Steals per game
BPG	Blocks per game	PPG	Points per game	**Bold**	Career high

=== NBA ===
==== Regular season ====
Year	Team	GP	MPG	FG%	FT%	RPG	APG	PPG
1954–55	New York	1	10.0	.000	.750	2.0	.0	3.0
