= Jack Turner (basketball, born 1930) =

American basketball player

Personal information
- Born: June 29, 1930 Bedford, Indiana, U.S.
- Died: October 5, 2014 (aged 84) Bedford, Indiana, U.S.
- Listed height: 6 ft 4 in (1.93 m)
- Listed weight: 170 lb (77 kg)

Career information
- High school: Bedford (Bedford, Indiana)
- College: Western Kentucky (1948–1951, 1953–1954)
- NBA draft: 1954: 1st round, 8th overall pick
- Drafted by: New York Knicks
- Position: Small forward / shooting guard
- Number: 16

Career history
- 1954–1955: New York Knicks
- Stats at NBA.com
- Stats at Basketball Reference

Jackie Lee Turner (June 29, 1930 – October 5, 2014) was an American basketball player for the New York Knicks in the National Basketball Association (NBA). He was drafted with the eighth pick in the first round of the 1954 NBA draft by the Knicks. In his one NBA season, Turner averaged 4.3 points per game, 2.4 rebounds per game and 1.2 assists per game. He died at a hospital in Bedford, Indiana in 2014.

== Career statistics ==
Legend
GP	Games played	GS	Games started	MPG	Minutes per game
FG%	Field goal percentage	3P%	3-point field goal percentage	FT%	Free throw percentage
RPG	Rebounds per game	APG	Assists per game	SPG	Steals per game
BPG	Blocks per game	PPG	Points per game	**Bold**	Career high

=== NBA ===
==== Regular season ====
Year	Team	GP	MPG	FG%	FT%	RPG	APG	PPG
1954–55	New York	65	14.2	.360	.789	2.4	1.2	4.3

==== Playoffs ====
Year	Team	GP	MPG	FG%	FT%	RPG	APG	PPG
1955	New York	2	8.0	.333	.333	2.0	1.0	2.5
