= Ray Felix =

American basketball player (1930–1991)

Personal information
- Born: December 10, 1930 New York City, U.S.
- Died: July 28, 1991 (aged 60) New York City, U.S.
- Listed height: 6 ft 11 in (2.11 m)
- Listed weight: 220 lb (100 kg)

Career information
- High school: Metropolitan (New York City, New York)
- College: LIU Brooklyn (1949–1951)
- NBA draft: 1953: 1st round, 1st overall pick
- Drafted by: Baltimore Bullets
- Playing career: 1952–1962
- Position: Center
- Number: 25, 19, 14

Career history
- 1952–1953: Manchester British-Americans
- 1953–1954: Baltimore Bullets
- 1954–1960: New York Knicks
- 1960–1962: Minneapolis/Los Angeles Lakers

Career highlights
- NBA All-Star (1954); NBA Rookie of the Year (1954)

Career NBA statistics
- Points: 6,974 (10.9 ppg)
- Rebounds: 5,652 (8.9 rpg)
- Assists: 458 (0.7 apg)
- Stats at NBA.com
- Stats at Basketball Reference

Raymond Darlington Felix Sr. (December 10, 1930 – July 28, 1991) was an American professional basketball player. He was born in New York City. He played high school basketball at Metropolitan High School in New York and college basketball at Long Island University. Felix was drafted No. 1 overall pick in the 1953 NBA draft, the first African American first selection in NBA history.

== Basketball career ==
A 6' 11" center from Metropolitan High School and Long Island University, Felix was selected by the Baltimore Bullets with the first pick in the 1953 NBA draft.

Felix won the NBA Rookie of the Year Award in 1954 after averaging 17.6 points and 13.3 rebounds. Felix was also the second African-American, following Don Barksdale, to be named an All-Star. His 13.3 rebounds is on the List of National Basketball Association rookie single-season rebounding leaders.

After his rookie season, Felix was traded on September 17, 1954. The soon to be folded Baltimore Bullets traded Felix and Chuck Grigsby to the New York Knicks for Alfred McGuire and Connie Simmons.

In six seasons with the Knicks, Felix averaged 12.0 points and 9.1 rebounds.

On January 24, 1960, Felix was traded by the Knicks, with a 1960 4th round draft pick (Ben Warley was later selected), to the Minneapolis Lakers for Dick Garmaker and a 1960 2nd round draft pick (Dave Budd was later selected).

In his Lakers tenure, the team moved from Minneapolis to Los Angeles and his role turned to a reserve one. He averaged 6.4 points and 6.7 rebounds in three seasons.

The Lakers lost to the Celtics in the 1962 NBA Finals, in seven games. Felix averaged 4.0 points and 4.0 rebounds in the series, which marked the end of his NBA career.

Overall, Felix spent nine seasons in the league, and played for the Bullets, New York Knicks and the Minneapolis/Los Angeles Lakers. Felix averaged 10.9 points and 8.9 rebounds per game, with career totals of 6,974 points and 5,652 rebounds. He retired in 1962.

== Russell rivalry ==
Felix had an incident with future Hall of Famer Bill Russell in Russell's rookie season, when, after Russell felt that Felix had been trying to intimidate him, he knocked Felix unconscious with a punch to the head.

Toward the end of his career, after having several of his shots blocked by Russell, Felix took the ball and flung it off the side of the backboard, saying to Russell, smiling, "You didn't get that one!"

Felix and the Lakers lost to Russell and the Celtics in the 1962 NBA Finals, in seven games.

== After basketball ==
Following his retirement, Felix worked for the New York City Department of Parks and Recreation where he sponsored a basketball tournament in Elmhurst, Queens and later worked as a supervisor at Harlem men's shelter.

Felix died of a heart attack on July 28, 1991.

== Personal life ==
Felix had a son, Ray Jr., with his wife Gloria.

== NBA career statistics ==
Legend
GP	Games played	GS	Games started	MPG	Minutes per game
FG%	Field goal percentage	3P%	3-point field goal percentage	FT%	Free throw percentage
RPG	Rebounds per game	APG	Assists per game	SPG	Steals per game
BPG	Blocks per game	PPG	Points per game	**Bold**	Career high

=== Regular season ===
Year	Team	GP	MPG	FG%	FT%	RPG	APG	PPG
1953–54	Baltimore	72	**37.1**	.417	.638	**13.3**	**1.1**	**17.6**
1954–55	New York	72	28.1	.438	.622	11.4	0.9	14.4
1955–56	New York	72	23.6	.415	.706	8.7	0.7	12.3
1956–57	New York	72	22.5	.416	**.747**	8.2	0.5	12.0
1957–58	New York	72	23.7	**.442**	.697	10.4	0.7	12.2
1958–59	New York	72	22.1	.371	.713	7.9	0.7	10.4
1959–60	New York	16	11.6	.330	.576	5.1	0.1	5.1
1959–60	Minneapolis	31	22.5	.402	.646	8.3	0.9	8.4
1960–61	L.A. Lakers	78	19.4	.372	.699	6.9	0.5	6.6
1961–62	L.A. Lakers	**80**	18.5	.430	.692	5.9	0.7	5.4
Career		637	23.8	.412	.678	8.9	0.7	10.9
All-Star		1	32.0	.500	1.000	11.0	1.0	13.0

=== Playoffs ===
Year	Team	GP	MPG	FG%	FT%	RPG	APG	PPG
1955	New York	3	21.0	.125	.619	4.0	0.3	5.7
1959	New York	2	22.5	.429	.500	**11.5**	1.0	**13.0**
1960	Minneapolis	8	18.4	.415	.720	6.6	**1.1**	6.5
1961	L.A. Lakers	12	**28.3**	.422	**.769**	10.4	0.8	10.2
1962	L.A. Lakers	**13**	18.6	**.492**	.684	5.9	0.5	6.5
Career		38	22.0	.419	.701	7.6	0.8	7.9
