= 1954–55 New York Knicks season =

Season of National Basketball Association team the New York Knicks

- Head coach: Joe Lapchick
- General manager: Ned Irish
- Arena: Madison Square Garden

Results
- Record: 38–34 (.528)
- Place: Division: 2nd (Eastern)
- Playoff finish: East Division semifinals (lost to Celtics 1–2)
- Stats at Basketball Reference

Local media
- Television: WPIX
- Radio: WMGM

The 1954–55 New York Knickerbockers season was the team's ninth year in the National Basketball Association (NBA). During the regular season, the Knickerbockers achieved a 38–34 record, securing second place in the Atlantic Division. This performance earned New York its ninth consecutive NBA playoff berth. The Knickerbockers lost in the best-of-three first round to the Boston Celtics, 2–1.

== Offseason ==
=== NBA draft ===
Note: This is not an extensive list; it only covers the first and second rounds, and any other players picked by the franchise that played at least one game in the league.

Round	Pick	Player	Position	Nationality	School/Club team
1	8	Jack Turner	G/F	United States	Western Kentucky
2	17	Richie Guerin	G	United States	Iona
3	26	Don Anielak	F	United States	SW Missouri State

== Regular season ==
=== Season standings ===
Eastern Division	W	L	PCT	GB	Home	Road	Neutral	Div
x-Syracuse Nationals	43	29	.597	–	25–7	10–17	8–5	21–15
x-New York Knicks	38	34	.528	5	17–9	8–17	13–8	15–21
x-Boston Celtics	36	36	.500	7	21–5	4–22	11–9	19–17
Philadelphia Warriors	33	39	.458	10	14–5	6–20	13–14	17–19

=== Game log ===
1954–55 game log
#	Date	Opponent	Score	High points	Record
1	October 30	Minneapolis	83–94	Carl Braun (26)	1–0
2	November 2	@ Milwaukee	91–84	Baechtold, Felix, McGuire (14)	2–0
3	November 6	@ Fort Wayne	83–90	Ray Felix (16)	2–1
4	November 7	@ Minneapolis	103–93 (OT)	Nathaniel Clifton (29)	3–1
5	November 11	Rochester	78–79	Carl Braun (19)	4–1
6	November 13	@ Philadelphia	86–87	Carl Braun (19)	4–2
—	November 14	@ Baltimore	95–93	—	4–2
—	November 16	Baltimore	107–110	—	4–2
7	November 18	N Philadelphia	94–96	Harry Gallatin (23)	5–2
8	November 20	Boston	117–98	Felix, Gallatin (21)	5–3
9	November 24	@ Boston	103–108	Nathaniel Clifton (22)	5–4
10	November 27	Syracuse	80–74	Nathaniel Clifton (14)	5–5
11	November 28	@ Syracuse	77–79	Harry Gallatin (20)	5–6
12	November 30	Philadelphia	91–95 (OT)	Harry Gallatin (20)	6–6
13	December 1	N Syracuse	86–88	Nathaniel Clifton (19)	7–6
14	December 4	Fort Wayne	90–88	Clifton, Felix (14)	7–7
15	December 7	Minneapolis	89–97	Carl Braun (27)	8–7
16	December 8	N Philadelphia	86–77	Ray Felix (15)	8–8
17	December 9	@ Philadelphia	98–96	Carl Braun (27)	9–8
18	December 11	@ Milwaukee	97–87	Ray Felix (21)	10–8
19	December 12	@ Minneapolis	73–80	Braun, Gallatin (18)	10–9
20	December 14	Syracuse	91–82	Harry Gallatin (22)	10–10
21	December 15	N Syracuse	81–88	Ray Felix (27)	11–10
22	December 18	@ Milwaukee	91–85	Carl Braun (19)	12–10
23	December 19	Boston	81–93	Ray Felix (24)	13–10
24	December 25	Syracuse	101–109	Ray Felix (21)	14–10
25	December 26	@ Syracuse	92–97 (OT)	Nathaniel Clifton (21)	14–11
26	December 28	Philadelphia	84–78	Braun, Clifton (23)	14–12
27	December 29	@ Rochester	89–93	Ray Felix (19)	14–13
28	December 31	N Milwaukee	64–89	Ray Felix (17)	14–14
29	January 1	Milwaukee	91–100	Dick McGuire (22)	15–14
30	January 2	@ Boston	96–113	Jim Baechtold (20)	15–15
31	January 5	@ Rochester	85–103	Felix, Gallatin (14)	15–16
32	January 6	Boston	83–88	Nathaniel Clifton (28)	16–16
33	January 7	N Milwaukee	75–85	Carl Braun (29)	16–17
34	January 9	Philadelphia	84–86	Ray Felix (23)	17–17
35	January 13	N Boston	100–116	Jim Baechtold (33)	17–18
36	January 14	N Fort Wayne	97–83	Dick McGuire (20)	18–18
37	January 15	Fort Wayne	87–106	Carl Braun (22)	19–18
38	January 16	@ Boston	98–102	Harry Gallatin (20)	19–19
39	January 19	N Rochester	83–98	Carl Braun (23)	20–19
40	January 22	Philadelphia	102–99	Carl Braun (24)	20–20
41	January 23	@ Syracuse	98–89	Harry Gallatin (25)	21–20
42	January 25	N Rochester	107–104	Carl Braun (26)	21–21
43	January 26	@ Rochester	94–96	Jim Baechtold (26)	21–22
44	January 27	@ Philadelphia	83–92	Harry Gallatin (24)	21–23
45	January 29	Milwaukee	93–95 (OT)	Nathaniel Clifton (25)	22–23
46	January 31	N Fort Wayne	91–84	Nathaniel Clifton (22)	23–23
47	February 2	N Minneapolis	81–96	Clifton, McGuire (16)	23–24
48	February 3	@ Minneapolis	83–90	Carl Braun (17)	23–25
49	February 5	Boston	107–115	Jim Baechtold (26)	24–25
50	February 6	@ Syracuse	75–77	Ray Felix (26)	24–26
51	February 8	Minneapolis	95–98	Nathaniel Clifton (18)	25–26
52	February 9	N Minneapolis	118–112	Harry Gallatin (30)	26–26
53	February 12	Fort Wayne	82–88	Nathaniel Clifton (24)	27–26
54	February 13	@ Boston	105–103	Ray Felix (20)	28–26
55	February 14	N Fort Wayne	92–88	Harry Gallatin (23)	29–26
56	February 17	N Fort Wayne	93–86	Ray Felix (20)	30–26
57	February 19	Syracuse	80–78	Nathaniel Clifton (22)	30–27
58	February 20	@ Syracuse	84–104	Nathaniel Clifton (17)	30–28
59	February 22	Philadelphia	102–103	Jim Baechtold (23)	31–28
60	February 23	N Philadelphia	98–96	Baechtold, Felix (18)	31–29
61	February 25	@ Philadelphia	111–113 (3OT)	Jim Baechtold (30)	31–30
62	February 26	Milwaukee	79–72	Baechtold, Gallatin (13)	31–31
63	February 27	@ Fort Wayne	95–83	Ray Felix (18)	32–31
64	March 1	Syracuse	105–102	Carl Braun (25)	32–32
65	March 3	N Milwaukee	103–89	Nathaniel Clifton (22)	33–32
66	March 4	N Rochester	92–95	Jim Baechtold (24)	34–32
67	March 6	Rochester	96–101	Ray Felix (22)	35–32
68	March 7	N Minneapolis	96–97	Carl Braun (24)	35–33
69	March 8	N Rochester	96–99	Jim Baechtold (22)	36–33
70	March 10	Boston	95–114	Baechtold, Gallatin (21)	37–33
71	March 11	N Boston	97–95	Harry Gallatin (21)	38–33
72	March 13	@ Boston	101–112	Ray Felix (31)	38–34

== Playoffs ==
1955 playoff game log
Division semifinals: 1–2 (home: 1–1; road: 0–1)

Game	Date	Team	Score	High points	High assists	Location	Series
1	March 15	@ Boston	L 101–122	Jim Baechtold (17)	—	Boston Garden	0–1
2	March 16	Boston	W 102–95	Nat Clifton (25)	—	Madison Square Garden III	1–1
3	March 19	Boston	L 109–116	Nat Clifton (21)	Nat Clifton (6)	Madison Square Garden III	1–2

1955 schedule

== Awards and records ==
- Harry Gallatin, All-NBA Second Team
