= Iona Gaels men's basketball =

Men's basketball team of Iona University

2026–27 Iona Gaels men's basketball team
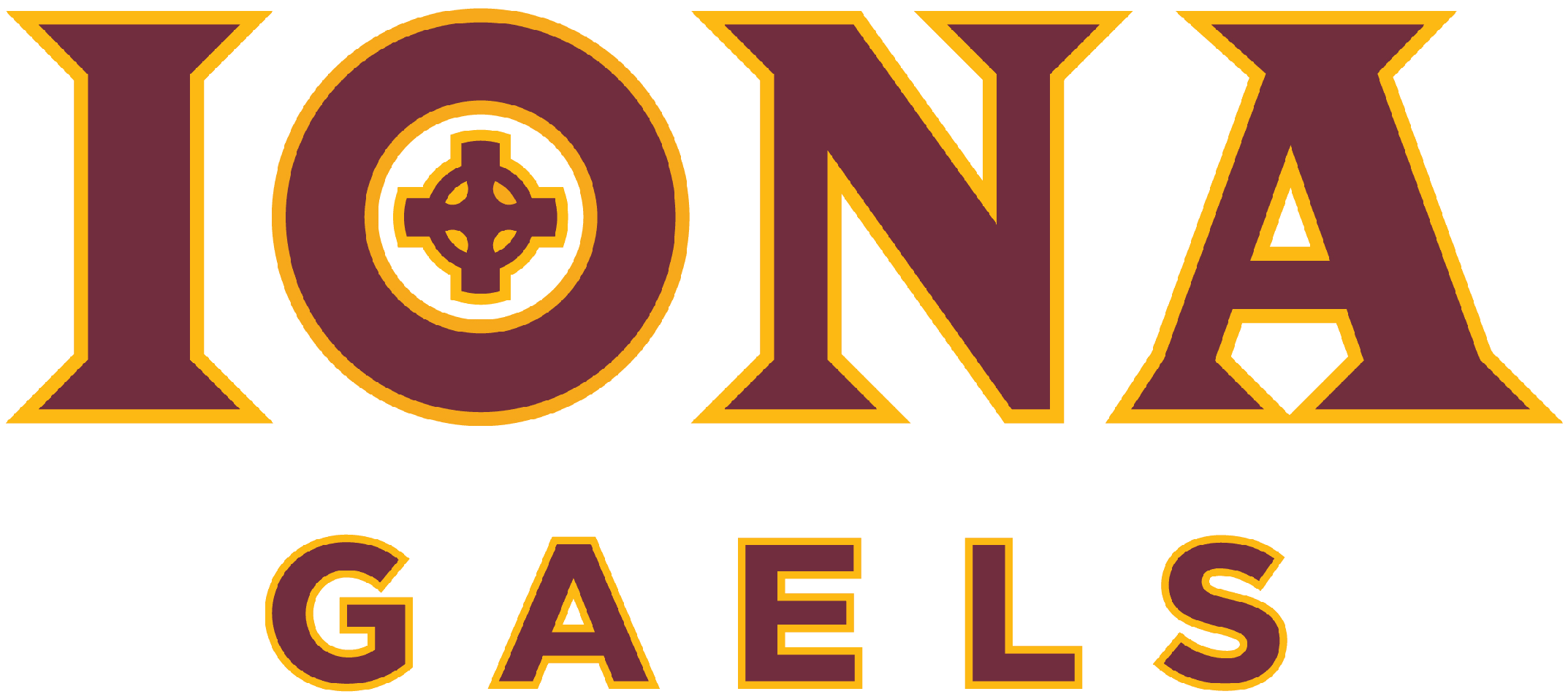
- University: Iona University
- Head coach: Dan Geriot (2nd season)
- Location: New Rochelle, New York
- Arena: Hynes Athletics Center (capacity: 2,611)
- Conference: MAAC
- Nickname: Gaels
- Colors: Maroon and gold

NCAA Division I tournament round of 32
- 1980*

NCAA Division I tournament appearances
- 1979, 1980*, 1984, 1985, 1998, 2000, 2001, 2006, 2012, 2013, 2016, 2017, 2018, 2019, 2021, 2023

Conference tournament champions
- 1982, 1984, 1985, 1998, 2000, 2001, 2006, 2013, 2016, 2017, 2018, 2019, 2021, 2023

Conference regular-season champions
- 1983, 1984, 1985, 1996, 1997, 1998, 2001, 2012, 2014, 2015, 2019, 2022, 2023

Uniforms
Home	Away
- * – vacated by NCAA

The Iona Gaels men's basketball team represents Iona University in New Rochelle, New York in NCAA Division I competition. The school's team competes in the Metro Atlantic Athletic Conference (MAAC) and plays home games in Hynes Athletics Center. Iona hired Dan Geriot on March 20, 2025. The Gaels have appeared 16 times in the NCAA tournament, most recently in 2023.

== History ==
Iona University has been competing in Division I basketball since the school's inception in 1940. Their first taste of success came with the ECAC men's basketball tournaments (essentially regional tournaments played by Division I schools that were essentially independent, with Iona being in the Metro) in 1979 and 1980, winning the two years for an autobid to the NCAA Tournament.

Iona is also one of the founding members of the Metro Atlantic Athletic Conference, which began play in men's basketball with the 1981–82 season, having been passed over by the Big East Conference for Seton Hall in 1980. The Gaels have compiled the most victories of any MAAC team since the founding of the conference and have won a league record fourteen MAAC tourney titles (1982, 1984, 1985, 1998, 2000, 2001, 2006, 2013, 2016, 2017, 2018, 2019, 2021, and 2023). They have appeared in the NCAA tournament in 1979, 1980, 1984, 1985, 1998, 2000, 2001, 2006, 2012, 2013, 2016, 2017, 2018, 2019, 2021 and 2023, with the first two of those appearances coming as a member of the Metropolitan Conference and in 2012 as an at-large selection out of the MAAC. The Gaels have also been to 7 NITs, in 1982, 1983, 1996, 1997, 2014, 2015 and 2022. In 2011, the Gaels made it to the final game of the CIT post-season tournament, losing at home to Santa Clara. Since the 1978–79 season, the Gaels have won 20 games or more in 23 seasons.

=== Coaching history ===
No.	Tenure	Coach	Years	Record	Pct.
1	1953–1973	Jim McDermott	20	217–208	.511
2	1973–1975	Gene Roberti*^	2	15–32	.319
3	1975–1980	Jim Valvano	5	95–46	.674
4	1980–1986	Pat Kennedy^	6	124–60	.674
5	1986–1991	Gary Brokaw	5	72–74	.493
6	1991–1995	Jerry Welsh	4	47–63	.427
7	1995–1998	Tim Welsh^	3	70–22	.761
8	1998–2007	Jeff Ruland*^	9	139–135	.507
9	2007–2010	Kevin Willard	3	45–49	.479
10	2010–2019	Tim Cluess	9	199–108	.648
11	2019–2020	Tra Arnold^	1	12–17	.414
12	2020–2023	Rick Pitino	3	64–22	.744
13	2023–2025	Tobin Anderson	2	33–34	.493
14	2025–present	Dan Geriot	1	18–14	.563
Totals		14 coaches	73 seasons	1,150–884	.565
Records updated through end of 2025–26 season Source; *Alum^Promoted from assistant to head coach

== Postseason ==
=== NCAA tournament results ===
The Gaels have appeared in 16 NCAA tournaments. Their combined record is 1–16. Iona's only NCAA tournament victory to date, which took place in 1980, was vacated by the NCAA due to their star center, Jeff Ruland, having signed a contract with an agent for professional representation a few months prior. Thus, NCAA record books attribute to them an 0–16 record in NCAA tournament games. The Gaels first five losses in NCAA tournament play were by a combined 11 points, including a heartbreaking buzzer-beater by Syracuse University in 1998; five teams that beat them went on to reach the Final Four and one won the championship.

Year	Seed	Round	Opponent	Result
1979	8	First Round	Penn	L 69–73
1980*	6	First Round; Second Round	Holy Cross; Georgetown	W 84–78; L 71–74
1984	10	First Round	Virginia	L 57–58
1985	13	First Round	Loyola (Chicago)	L 58–59
1998	12	First Round	Syracuse	L 61–63
2000	14	First Round	Maryland	L 59–74
2001	14	First Round	Ole Miss	L 70–72
2006	13	First Round	LSU	L 64–80
2012	14	First Four	BYU	L 72–78
2013	15	First Round	Ohio State	L 70–95
2016	13	First Round	Iowa State	L 81–94
2017	14	First Round	Oregon	L 77–93
2018	15	First Round	Duke	L 67–89
2019	16	First Round	North Carolina	L 73–88
2021	15	First Round	Alabama	L 55–68
2023	13	First Round	UConn	L 63–87

* Indicates vacated by NCAA.

=== NIT results ===
The Gaels have appeared in the National Invitation Tournament (NIT) seven times. Their combined record is 1–7.

Year	Round	Opponent	Result
1982	First Round	Rutgers	L 51–55
1983	First Round; Second Round	St. Bonaventure; Nebraska	W 90–76; L 73–85
1996	First Round	St. Joseph's	L 78–82
1997	First Round	Connecticut	L 66–71
2014	First Round	Louisiana Tech	L 88–89
2015	First Round	Rhode Island	L 75–88
2022	First Round	Florida	L 74–79

=== CIT results ===
The Gaels have appeared in the CollegeInsider.com Postseason Tournament (CIT) one time. Their record is 3–1.

Year	Round	Opponent	Result
2011	First Round; Quarterfinals; Semifinals; Championship Game	Valparaiso; Buffalo; East Tennessee State; Santa Clara	W 85–77; W 78–63; W 83–80; L 69–76

== Victories over ranked opponents ==
- Nov. 30, 1979: Iona 78, #14 Texas A&M 52 (Bucker Field House)
- Feb. 21, 1980: Iona 77, #2 Louisville 60 (Madison Square Garden)
- Dec. 27, 2002: Iona 65, #22 North Carolina 56 (Madison Square Garden)
- Nov. 26, 2005: Iona 89, #23 Iowa State 72 (Ames, Iowa)
- Nov. 25, 2021: Iona 72, #10 Alabama 68 (HP Fieldhouse, Orlando, FL)

== Gaels in the NBA ==
- Richie Guerin (Naismith Memorial Basketball Hall of Fame, 2013)
- Jeff Ruland (1984, 1985 All-Star Selection)
- Steve Burtt, Sr.
- Sean Green
- Scott Machado
- Bob Santini
- Daniss Jenkins
- Walter Clayton Jr.
