= Dick Atha =

American basketball player (1931–2020)

Personal information
- Born: September 21, 1931 Otterbein, Indiana
- Died: February 6, 2020 (aged 88) Oxford, Indiana
- Listed height: 6 ft 2 in (1.88 m)
- Listed weight: 190 lb (86 kg)

Career information
- High school: Otterbein (Otterbein, Indiana)
- College: Indiana State (1950–1953)
- NBA draft: 1953: 6th round, 50th overall pick
- Drafted by: New York Knicks
- Playing career: 1955–1958
- Position: Point guard
- Number: 17, 7

Career history
- 1955–1956: New York Knicks
- 1957–1958: Detroit Pistons

Career highlights
- 3x All-Indiana Collegiate Conference (ICC) 1x Helms Athletic Foundation All-American (1953)

Career statistics
- Points: 137
- Rebounds: 66
- Assists: 51
- Stats at NBA.com
- Stats at Basketball Reference
Medals
Men's basketball
Representing United States
Pan American Games
Gold medal – first place	1951 Buenos Aires	Team competition

Richard Ernest Atha (September 21, 1931 – February 6, 2020) was an American basketball player and coach.

== Basketball career ==
He played collegiately for the Indiana State Sycamores and scored 1,119 career points. He led the team in scoring during the 1951–52 (12.3 ppg) and 1952–53 (14.9 ppg) seasons. He was a 3-time All-Indiana Collegiate Conference guard and was selected as an Helms Athletic Foundation All-American for the 1953 season; leading the Sycamores to a 3rd-place finish in the National NAIA Tournament. He started every game during his 3-yr varsity career (85 games), as the Sycamores compiled a 57–28 (20–10 ICC) record.

During the 2nd round of the 1952–53 NAIA Tournament, he scored his career high (32 points) vs Arkansas Tech as the Sycamores soundly defeated the Wonder Boys, 100–81.

The Sycamores finished third in the tourney; which marked their fifth NAIA Final Four appearance; Atha led the team in scoring (100 pts) averaging 20.0 ppg during tourney play.

During his sophomore season, (1950–51), Atha was a member of the US National Men's Basketball team; he averaged 4.3 ppg in helping the U.S. to a 6–0 record and the first gold medal in Pan Am Games history.

He was selected by the New York Knicks in the 1953 NBA draft; however, he served two years in the United States Army before beginning his professional career; he played for the Knicks (1955–56) and Fort Wayne Pistons (now the Detroit Pistons) (1957–58) in the NBA for 43 games before an injury ended his playing career. He was one of fourteen rookies to make the 1955–56 squad.

== Later career ==
Following his NBA career, Atha was the head basketball coach at Oxford High for ten seasons. When Oxford High consolidated into Benton Central High School in Oxford, Indiana, he became the principal, serving during the 1970s and 1980s. He moved to the athletic director post in the summer of 1986, and retired from that position in 1997.

He was inducted into the Indiana State University Athletics Hall of Fame in 1984 and into the Indiana Basketball Hall of Fame in 1988.

Atha died on February 6, 2020, at age 88.

== Career statistics ==
Legend
GP	Games played	GS	Games started	MPG	Minutes per game
FG%	Field goal percentage	3P%	3-point field goal percentage	FT%	Free throw percentage
RPG	Rebounds per game	APG	Assists per game	SPG	Steals per game
BPG	Blocks per game	PPG	Points per game	**Bold**	Career high

=== NBA ===
==== Regular season ====
Year	Team	GP	MPG	FG%	FT%	RPG	APG	PPG
1955–56	New York	**25**	**11.5**	**.409**	.778	**1.7**	**1.3**	**3.7**
1957–58	Detroit	18	8.9	.362	**.833**	1.3	1.1	2.4
Career		43	10.4	.393	.795	1.5	1.2	3.2
