= Bob Santini =

American basketball player

Personal information
- Born: February 17, 1932 (age 94) Bronx, New York, U.S.
- Listed height: 6 ft 5 in (1.96 m)
- Listed weight: 190 lb (86 kg)

Career information
- High school: St. Simon-Stock (Bronx, New York)
- College: Iona (1950–1953)
- NBA draft: 1953: 5th round, 41st overall pick
- Drafted by: New York Knicks
- Position: Forward
- Number: 5

Career history
- 1955: New York Knicks
- Stats at NBA.com
- Stats at Basketball Reference

Robert Santini (born February 17, 1932) is an American former professional basketball player. Santini was selected in the 1953 NBA draft by the New York Knicks after a collegiate career at Iona. He played in four games and totaled 11 points, three rebounds and one assist.

== Career statistics ==
Legend
GP	Games played	GS	Games started	MPG	Minutes per game
FG%	Field goal percentage	3P%	3-point field goal percentage	FT%	Free throw percentage
RPG	Rebounds per game	APG	Assists per game	SPG	Steals per game
BPG	Blocks per game	PPG	Points per game	**Bold**	Career high

=== NBA ===
==== Regular season ====
Year	Team	GP	MPG	FG%	FT%	RPG	APG	PPG
1955–56	New York	4	5.8	.500	.500	.8	.3	2.8
