= Nield Gordon =

American basketball player

Personal information
- Born: November 17, 1930 Brunswick, Maryland, U.S.
- Died: May 2, 2022 (aged 91) Anderson, South Carolina, U.S.
- Listed height: 6 ft 6 in (1.98 m)
- Listed weight: 195 lb (88 kg)

Career information
- High school: Brunswick (Brunswick, Maryland)
- College: Wingate (1949–1951); Furman (1951–1953)
- NBA draft: 1953: 2nd round, 14th overall pick
- Drafted by: New York Knicks
- Position: Forward
- Coaching career: 1956–1986

Career history

Coaching
- 1956–1957: Belmont Abbey
- 1957–1962: Furman (assistant)
- 1963–1977: Newberry
- 1978–1986: Winthrop

Career highlights
- As player: Second-team All-Southern (1953); No. 27 retired by Furman Paladins; As coach: NAIA Coach of the Year (1977)
- Stats at Basketball Reference

Nield Philip Gordon (November 17, 1930 – May 2, 2022) was an American college basketball coach, administrator and player. He served as the athletic director and men's basketball head coach of the Winthrop Eagles where he was influential in the development of the sports programs at Winthrop University. Gordon played college basketball for the Furman Paladins and was selected in the second round of the 1953 NBA draft by the New York Knicks. He embarked on a coaching career instead of playing professional basketball and spent 30 years at the collegiate level.

== College basketball career ==
Gordon was born in Brunswick, Maryland, and attended Brunswick High School where he graduated in 1947. He started his college basketball playing career at Wingate Junior College (now Wingate University). He was an National Junior College Athletic Association (NJCAA) all-conference selection in 1950 and 1951, and led the league in scoring during the 1950–51 season.

Gordon graduated from Winthrop and joined the Furman Paladins for two seasons where he led the team to a 39–12 record. He averaged 24.3 points per game and earned second-team All-Southern Conference honors as a senior in 1953.

His number 27 was retired by the Furman Paladins in 2002.

== Coaching career ==
Gordon was selected by the New York Knicks in the 1953 NBA draft. He served in the United States Army before starting his coaching career.

Gordon started his coaching career as head coach of the men's basketball team at Belmont Abbey College during the 1956–57 season. After a one-year stint, he returned to Furman as an assistant coach until he accepted the head coaching position at Newberry College in 1962. Gordon led the Indians basketball team from 1963 to 1977. He coached one of the most successful teams in school history during the 1976–77 season as he led the Indians to a 36–1 record and was selected as the NAIA Coach of the Year.

Gordon left Newberry in 1977 to join Winthrop University where he had a year to establish the men's basketball team. He served as the head coach of the Winthrop Eagles men's basketball team from 1978 to 1986. Gordon guided to the team to 25 wins in their inaugural season. He led the Eagles to a 31–8 record during the 1980–81 season and became the third team in South Carolina collegiate history to win more than 30 games. He amassed a 160–100 record during his eight seasons. Gordon retired as the Eagles head coach after the 1985–86 season.

After a brief retirement, Gordon returned to coaching at the high school level in Upstate South Carolina.

== Administrative career ==
While serving as the men's basketball coach, Gordon also served as the athletic director of Winthrop University from 1978 to 1985. He played a significant role in the planning and construction of the Winthrop Coliseum. Gordon led the university's transition from the National Association of Intercollegiate Athletics to NCAA Division I. The athletic department also started the baseball, cross country and men's golf programs under his tenure.

Gordon founded Camp Chatuga in Mountain Rest, South Carolina, in 1956 and ran the camp for over 30 years.

== Legacy ==
Gordon was inducted into the South Carolina Athletic Hall of Fame in 1978, Furman Athletics Hall of Fame in 1981, NAIA Hall of Fame in 1983, Wingate University Athletics Hall of Fame in 1986, Winthrop University Athletics Hall of Fame in 2005, and Newberry College Hall of Fame in 2009.

== Death ==
Gordon died on May 2, 2022, at The Legacy of Anderson independent living community in Anderson, South Carolina, aged 91.
