= 1953–54 NBA season =

Eighth NBA season

- League: National Basketball Association
- Sport: Basketball
- Duration: October 30, 1953 – March 14, 1954; March 16–28, 1954 (Playoffs); March 31 – April 12, 1954 (Finals)
- Games: 72
- Teams: 9
- TV partner: DuMont

Draft
- Top draft pick: Ray Felix
- Picked by: Baltimore Bullets

Regular season
- Top seed: Minneapolis Lakers
- Top scorer: Neil Johnston (Philadelphia)

Playoffs
- Eastern champions: Syracuse Nationals
- Eastern runners-up: Boston Celtics
- Western champions: Minneapolis Lakers
- Western runners-up: Rochester Royals

Finals
- Champions: Minneapolis Lakers
- Runners-up: Syracuse Nationals

NBA seasons
- ← 1952–53 1954–55 →

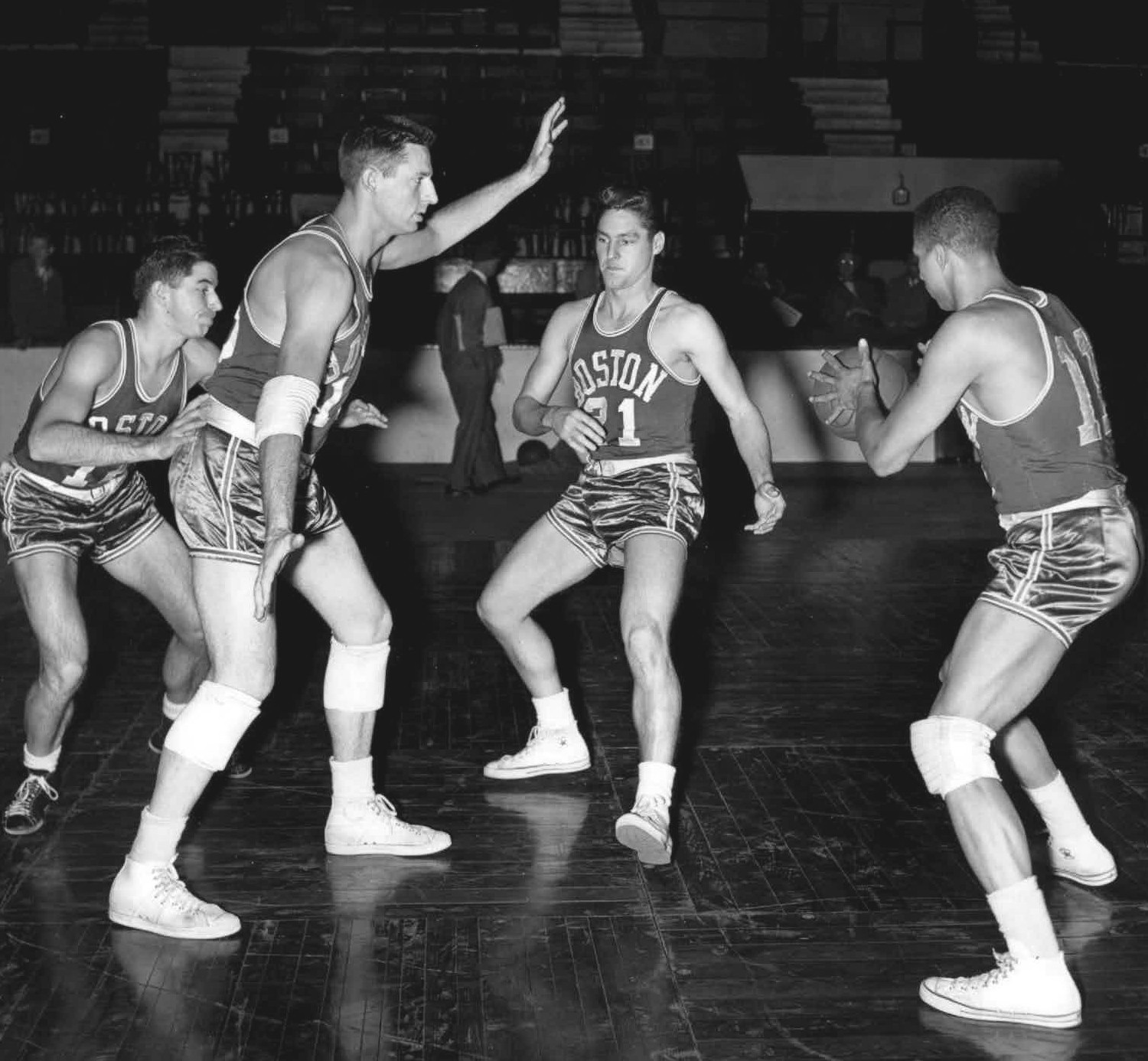
The 1953–54 Boston Celtics basketball team practicing the pick and roll. From left to rightː Bob Donham, Ed Mikan, Bill Sharman and Chuck Cooper.

The 1953–54 NBA season was the eighth season of the National Basketball Association. The season ended with the Minneapolis Lakers winning their fifth NBA championship in six years, beating the Syracuse Nationals 4 games to 3 in the NBA Finals. It was also the final time the Lakers would win an NBA championship before the franchise moved to Los Angeles in 1960.

== Notable occurrences ==
- This was the last NBA season without the 24 second shotclock.
- The Indianapolis Olympians folded prior to the start of the season. Indianapolis would return to professional basketball with the Pacers of the ABA in 1967. The NBA returned to Indianapolis for the 1976–77 season, when the Pacers joined the Association as part of the NBA-ABA merger.
- The 1954 NBA All-Star Game was played in New York City, with the East beating the West 98–93 in overtime. Bob Cousy of the Boston Celtics won the game's MVP award.
- This marked the first year the NBA had a national television contract. The contract had the DuMont Television Network televising 13 games, paying 39,000 dollars for the rights.

Coaching changes
In-season
Team	Outgoing coach	Incoming coach
Milwaukee Hawks	Andrew Levane	Red Holzman

== Final standings ==
=== Eastern Division ===
Eastern Division	W	L	PCT	GB	Home	Road	Neutral	Div
x-New York Knicks	44	28	.611	–	18–8	15–13	11–7	24–16
x-Boston Celtics	42	30	.583	2	17–6	10–19	15–5	25–15
x-Syracuse Nationals	42	30	.583	2	26–6	11–17	5–7	21–19
Philadelphia Warriors	29	43	.403	15	10–9	6–16	13–18	19–21
Baltimore Bullets	16	56	.222	28	12–18	0–22	4–16	11–29

=== Western Division ===
Western Division	W	L	PCT	GB	Home	Road	Neutral	Div
x-Minneapolis Lakers	46	26	.639	–	20–4	13–15	13–7	19–13
x-Rochester Royals	44	28	.611	2	18–10	12–15	14–3	22–10
x-Fort Wayne Pistons	40	32	.556	6	19–8	11–17	10–7	17–15
Milwaukee Hawks	21	51	.292	25	11–14	5–17	6–20	6–26

x – clinched playoff spot

== Playoffs ==
Division Round Robin Semifinals
1954 NBA playoffs
Bracket

Division Finals

NBA Finals

- * Division winner
- Bold Series winner (Division Round Robin Semifinals: top 2 advanced)
- Italic Team with home-court advantage in NBA Finals

== Statistics leaders ==
Category	Player	Team	Stat
Points	Neil Johnston	Philadelphia Warriors	1,759
Rebounds	Harry Gallatin	New York Knicks	1,098
Assists	Bob Cousy	Boston Celtics	518
FG%	Ed Macauley	Boston Celtics	.486
FT%	Bill Sharman	Boston Celtics	.844

Note: Prior to the 1969–70 season, league leaders in points, rebounds, and assists were determined by totals rather than averages.

== NBA awards ==
- Rookie of the Year: Ray Felix, Baltimore Bullets
- All-NBA First Team:
  - George Mikan, Minneapolis Lakers
  - Harry Gallatin, New York Knicks
  - Dolph Schayes, Syracuse Nationals
  - Bob Cousy, Boston Celtics
  - Neil Johnston, Philadelphia Warriors
- All-NBA Second Team:
  - Carl Braun, New York Knicks
  - Ed Macauley, Boston Celtics
  - Jim Pollard, Minneapolis Lakers
  - Paul Seymour, Syracuse Nationals
  - Bobby Wanzer, Rochester Royals

== See also ==
- List of NBA regular season records
