= List of Baltimore Bullets (1944–1954) players =

The following is a list of players of the now-defunct 1944–1954 Baltimore Bullets professional basketball team.

- John Abramovic
- Don Asmonga
- Jim Baechtold
- Don Barksdale
- Leo Barnhorst
- Mike Bloom
- Bill Bolger
- Don Boven
- Darrell Brown
- Walt Budko
- Dick Bunt
- Tommy Byrnes
- Bill Calhoun
- Don Carlson
- Paul Cloyd
- Ray Corley
- Blaine Denning
- Joe Dolhon
- Johnny Ezersky
- George Feigenbaum
- Ray Felix
- Jim Fritsche
- Herm Fuetsch
- Elmer Gainer
- Paul Gordon
- Chick Halbert
- Alex Hannum
- Rollen Hans
- Billy Hassett
- Don Henriksen
- Kleggie Hermsen
- Paul Hoffman
- Doug Holcomb
- Bob Houbregs
- Gene James
- Howie Janotta
- Buddy Jeannette
- Johnny Jorgensen
- George Kaftan
- Jack Kerris
- Dan King
- Herman Klotz
- Lee Knorek
- Dan Kraus
- Herb Krautblatt
- Frank Kudelka
- Robert Latshaw
- Freddie Lewis
- Grady Lewis
- Ron Livingstone
- Jim Luisi
- Ray Lumpp
- Norm Mager
- John Mahnken
- Mo Mahoney
- John Mandic
- Don Martin
- Mike McCarron
- Alfred McGuire
- George McLeod
- Chet McNabb
- Joe McNamee
- Dick Mehen
- Carl Meinhold
- Stan Miasek
- Eddie Miller
- Dave Minor
- Leo Mogus
- Ken Murray
- Jim Neal
- Paul Nolen
- Ralph O'Brien
- Andy O'Donnell
- Tommy O'Keefe
- Kevin O'Shea
- Don Otten
- Red Owens
- Jake Pelkington
- Bob Peterson
- Bob Priddy
- Les Pugh
- Howie Rader
- Ray Ramsey
- George Ratkovicz
- Connie Rea
- Don Rehfeldt
- Chick Reiser
- Red Rocha
- Al Roges
- Irv Rothenberg
- Jerry Rullo
- Ed Sadowski
- Kenny Sailors
- Pep Saul
- Marv Schatzman
- Dick Schulz
- Fred Scolari
- Frank Selvy
- Paul Seymour
- Connie Simmons
- Jim Slaughter
- Belus Smawley
- Joe Smyth
- Stan Stutz
- Sid Tanenbaum
- Hal Tidrick
- Jack Toomay
- Irv Torgoff
- Bob Tough
- Blackie Towery
- Dick Triptow
- Hal Uplinger
- Whitey Von Nieda
- Brady Walker
- Mark Workman
- Max Zaslofsky
