= 1954 NBA Finals =

1954 basketball championship series

Team	Coach	Wins
Minneapolis Lakers	John Kundla	4
Syracuse Nationals	Al Cervi	3
- Dates: March 31–April 12
- Hall of Famers: Lakers: George Mikan (1959); Jim Pollard (1978); Clyde Lovellette (1988); Vern Mikkelsen (1995); Slater Martin (1982); Nationals: Dolph Schayes (1973); Earl Lloyd (2003); Coaches: John Kundla (1995); Al Cervi (1985, player)
- Eastern finals: Nationals defeated Celtics, 2–0
- Western finals: Lakers defeated Royals, 2–1

The 1954 NBA World Championship Series was the championship round of the 1954 NBA playoffs, which concluded the National Basketball Association (NBA)'s 1953–54 season. The Western Division champion Minneapolis Lakers faced the Eastern Division champion Syracuse Nationals in a best-of-seven series with Minneapolis having home-court advantage. The Lakers won their third consecutive NBA championship and fifth title in six years dating from 1949.

Minneapolis won Game 1 and the teams thereafter alternated victories, with the Lakers winning the decisive game by a seven-point margin at home. The seven games were played in thirteen days, beginning Wednesday, March 31 and concluding Monday, April 12. The entire postseason tournament spanned 28 days in which both Minneapolis and Syracuse played 13 games. This was the Lakers’ last championship during their time in Minneapolis, as the team would move to Los Angeles and would not win the championship again until 1972.

This was the last major professional sports championship won by a Minneapolis-St. Paul-based team until the Minnesota Twins won the 1987 World Series.

== Team rosters ==
=== Minneapolis Lakers ===
1953–54 Minneapolis Lakers roster
Players

Pos.	No.	Player	Height	Weight	DOB	From
PF		Jim Fritsche	6 ft 8 in (2.03 m)	210 lb (95 kg)	1931-12-10	Hamline
G	16	Bob Harrison	6 ft 1 in (1.85 m)	190 lb (86 kg)	1927-08-12	Michigan
SF	12	Jim Holstein	6 ft 3 in (1.91 m)	180 lb (82 kg)	1930-09-24	Cincinnati
C	34−89	Clyde Lovellette	6 ft 9 in (2.06 m)	234 lb (106 kg)	1929-09-07	Kansas
PG	22	Slater Martin	5 ft 10 in (1.78 m)	170 lb (77 kg)	1925-10-22	Texas
C	99	George Mikan	6 ft 10 in (2.08 m)	245 lb (111 kg)	1924-06-18	DePaul
PF	19	Vern Mikkelsen	6 ft 7 in (2.01 m)	230 lb (104 kg)	1928-10-21	Hamline
SF	17	Jim Pollard	6 ft 4 in (1.93 m)	185 lb (84 kg)	1922-07-09	Stanford
SG	18	Pep Saul	6 ft 2 in (1.88 m)	185 lb (84 kg)	1924-02-16	Seton Hall
SF	15−24	Dick Schnittker	6 ft 5 in (1.96 m)	200 lb (91 kg)	1928-05-27	Ohio State
SG	20	Whitey Skoog	5 ft 11 in (1.80 m)	180 lb (82 kg)	1926-11-02	Minnesota

Coaches
Head coach

John Kundla

Legend
- (DP) Unsigned draft pick
- (FA) Free agent
- (S) Suspended
- Injured

Roster

=== Syracuse Nationals ===
1953–54 Syracuse Nationals roster
Players

Pos.	No.	Player	Height	Weight	DOB	From
SG	7	Bill Gabor	5 ft 11 in (1.80 m)	170 lb (77 kg)	May 13, 1922	Syracuse
PG	15	Billy Kenville	6 ft 2 in (1.88 m)	187 lb (85 kg)	December 1, 1930	St. Bonaventure
PG	3	George King	6 ft 0 in (1.83 m)	175 lb (79 kg)	August 16, 1928	Charleston (WV)
PF	16	Bob Lavoy	6 ft 7 in (2.01 m)	185 lb (84 kg)	June 29, 1926	Western Kentucky
SF	11	Earl Lloyd	6 ft 5 in (1.96 m)	200 lb (91 kg)	April 3, 1928	West Virginia State
PG	12	Al Masino	5 ft 10 in (1.78 m)	174 lb (79 kg)	February 5, 1928	Canisius
C	17	Jim Neal	6 ft 11 in (2.11 m)	235 lb (107 kg)	May 21, 1930	Wofford
PF	8	Wally Osterkorn	6 ft 5 in (1.96 m)	215 lb (98 kg)	July 6, 1928	Illinois
C	4	Dolph Schayes	6 ft 8 in (2.03 m)	220 lb (100 kg)	May 19, 1928	NYU
SG	5	Paul Seymour	6 ft 1 in (1.85 m)	180 lb (82 kg)	January 30, 1928	Toledo

Coaches
Head coach

Al Cervi

Legend
- (DP) Unsigned draft pick
- (FA) Free agent
- (S) Suspended
- Injured

Roster

== Series summary ==
Game	Date	Home team	Result	Road team
Game 1	March 31	Minneapolis Lakers	79–68 (1–0)	Syracuse Nationals
Game 2	April 3	Minneapolis Lakers	60–62 (1–1)	Syracuse Nationals
Game 3	April 4	Syracuse Nationals	67–81 (1–2)	Minneapolis Lakers
Game 4	April 8	Syracuse Nationals	80–69 (2–2)	Minneapolis Lakers
Game 5	April 10	Syracuse Nationals	73–84 (2–3)	Minneapolis Lakers
Game 6	April 11	Minneapolis Lakers	63–65 (3–3)	Syracuse Nationals
Game 7	April 12	Minneapolis Lakers	87–80 (4–3)	Syracuse Nationals

Lakers win series 4–3

== Box scores ==
March 31

Boxscore

Syracuse Nationals 68, Minneapolis Lakers 79
Scoring by quarter: 13–10, 18–24, 19–22, 18–23
Pts: Bob Lavoy 15; Rebs: Wally Osterkorn 8 Asts: Paul Seymour 6	Pts: Clyde Lovellette 16; Rebs: George Mikan 10; Asts: Slater Martin 6
Minneapolis leads series, 1–0

Minneapolis Auditorium, Minneapolis, Minnesota
Attendance: 4,579
Referees: Charles Eckman, Joe Serafin

April 3

Boxscore

Syracuse Nationals 62, Minneapolis Lakers 60
Scoring by quarter: 15–15, 13–12, 20–11, 14–22
Pts: Wally Osterkorn 20; Rebs: Wally Osterkorn 17; Asts: Lavoy, Seymour 3 each	Pts: George Mikan 15; Rebs: George Mikan 15; Asts: Vern Mikkelsen 3
Series tied, 1–1

Minneapolis Auditorium, Minneapolis, Minnesota
Attendance: 6,277
Referees: Charles Eckman, Joe Serafin

- With seven seconds remaining, Paul Seymour hit a shot from 43 feet away to give Syracuse the victory. The 62 points scored by the Nationals set a record that still stands (as of 2026) for lowest amount of points scored in an NBA Finals game from the winning team.

April 4

Boxscore

Minneapolis Lakers 81, Syracuse Nationals 67
Scoring by quarter: 24–16, 14–17, 20–11, 23–23
Pts: George Mikan 30; Rebs: George Mikan 15; Asts: Slater Martin 7	Pts: Bob Lavoy 18; Rebs: Bob Lavoy 15; Asts: Paul Seymour 7
Minneapolis leads series, 2–1

Onondaga War Memorial, Syracuse, New York
Attendance: 8,719

April 8

Boxscore

Minneapolis Lakers 69, Syracuse Nationals 80
Scoring by quarter: 14–18, 20–18, 18–21, 17–23
Pts: Whitey Skoog 16; Rebs: Jim Pollard 9 Asts: Slater Martin 6	Pts: Paul Seymour 25; Rebs: Bob Lavoy 11; Asts: Paul Seymour 6
Series tied, 2–2

Onondaga War Memorial, Syracuse, New York
Attendance: 7,655

April 10

Boxscore

Minneapolis Lakers 84, Syracuse Nationals 73
Scoring by quarter: 22–17, 19–14, 21–21, 22–21
Pts: Vern Mikkelsen 21; Rebs: Mikan, Lovellette 13 each Asts: Slater Martin 7	Pts: Dolph Schayes 17; Rebs: Earl Lloyd 8 Asts: Paul Seymour 5
Minneapolis leads series, 3–2

Onondaga War Memorial, Syracuse, New York
Attendance: 7,283

April 11

Boxscore

Syracuse Nationals 65, Minneapolis Lakers 63
Scoring by quarter: 19–27, 19–16, 16–6, 11–14
Pts: Paul Seymour 16	Pts: George Mikan 30
Series tied, 3–3

Minneapolis Auditorium, Minneapolis, Minnesota
Attendance: 6,776
Referees: Charles Eckman, Joe Serafin

April 12

Boxscore

Syracuse Nationals 80, Minneapolis Lakers 87
Scoring by quarter: 14–17, 18–21, 22–27, 26–22
Pts: Dolph Schayes 18	Pts: Jim Pollard 21
Minneapolis wins series, 4–3

Minneapolis Auditorium, Minneapolis, Minnesota
Attendance: 7,274
Referees: Charles Eckman, Joe Serafin

== Television ==
Game two was the first NBA Finals contest to be carried live on national television, with the DuMont network providing the coverage. Game five was also aired by DuMont, featuring Marty Glickman doing play-by-play and Lindsey Nelson as the color analyst.
