= List of 1954–55 NBA season transactions =

This is a list of all personnel changes for the 1954 NBA off-season and 1954–55 NBA season.

== Events ==
=== September 17, 1954 ===
- The Baltimore Bullets traded Ray Felix and Chuck Grigsby to the New York Knicks for Alfred McGuire and Connie Simmons.

=== September 18, 1954 ===
- The Minneapolis Lakers traded Pep Saul to the Milwaukee Hawks for Don Sunderlage.

=== October 16, 1954 ===
- The Fort Wayne Pistons traded Fred Scolari to the Boston Celtics for Bob Harris.

=== October 19, 1954 ===
- The Philadelphia Warriors sold Paul Walther to the Fort Wayne Pistons.

=== October 26, 1954 ===
- The Baltimore Bullets traded Jim Fritsche to the Fort Wayne Pistons for Ken Murray.

=== November 1, 1954 ===
- The Syracuse Nationals sold Jackie Moore to the Milwaukee Hawks.

=== November 19, 1954 ===
- Clair Bee resigns as head coach for Baltimore Bullets.

=== November 28, 1954 ===
- The Philadelphia Warriors sold Gene Shue to the New York Knicks.
- The Rochester Royals selected Don Henriksen from the Baltimore Bullets in the dispersal draft.
- The New York Knicks selected Paul Hoffman from the Baltimore Bullets in the dispersal draft.
- The Boston Celtics selected Bob Houbregs from the Baltimore Bullets in the dispersal draft.
- The Minneapolis Lakers selected Slick Leonard from the Baltimore Bullets in the dispersal draft.
- The Philadelphia Warriors selected Ken Murray from the Baltimore Bullets in the dispersal draft.
- The Fort Wayne Pistons selected Al Roges from the Baltimore Bullets in the dispersal draft.
- The Milwaukee Hawks selected Frank Selvy from the Baltimore Bullets in the dispersal draft.
- The Syracuse Nationals selected Connie Simmons from the Baltimore Bullets in the dispersal draft.
- The Boston Celtics selected Eddie Miller from the Baltimore Bullets in the dispersal draft.
- The Rochester Royals selected Herm Hedderick from the Baltimore Bullets in the dispersal draft.
- The Milwaukee Hawks selected John Barber from the Baltimore Bullets in the dispersal draft.

=== December 8, 1954 ===
- The Fort Wayne Pistons claimed Bob Houbregs on waivers from the Boston Celtics.

=== December 10, 1954 ===
- The Rochester Royals sold Alex Hannum to the Milwaukee Hawks.

=== January 10, 1955 ===
- The New York Knicks signed Bob Peterson as a free agent.

=== January 12, 1955 ===
- The New York Knicks signed Paul Hoffman as a free agent.

=== February 15, 1955 ===
- The New York Knicks sold Paul Hoffman to the Philadelphia Warriors.

=== April 28, 1955 ===
- Les Harrison resigns as head coach for Rochester Royals.
- The Rochester Royals hired Bobby Wanzer as head coach.

=== May 12, 1955 ===
- The Philadelphia Warriors sold Zeke Zawoluk to the Rochester Royals.

== Notes ==
- ^{a} Number of years played in the NBA prior to the draft
- ^{b} Career with the franchise that drafted the player
- ^{c} Never played a game for the franchise
