= 1953–54 Baltimore Bullets season =

- Head coach: Clair Bee
- Arena: Baltimore Coliseum

Results
- Record: 16–56 (.222)
- Place: Division: 5th (Eastern)
- Playoff finish: Did not qualify
- Stats at Basketball Reference

Local media
- Television: WAAM
- Radio: WCBM

The 1953-54 Baltimore Bullets season was the Bullets' 7th season in the NBA and 10th overall season of existence. It would also become their final full season of play as a whole. Ray Felix won the NBA Rookie of the Year Award.

== Draft picks ==
Round	Pick	Player	Position	Nationality	College / Club
1	1	Ray Felix	C	United States	Manchester British-Americans (ABL)
2	8	Don Ackerman	PG	United States	Manchester British-Americans (ABL)
3	17	Bob Peterson	SF/PF	United States	Oregon
4	26	Paul Nolen	C	United States	Texas Tech
5	35	Bill Schyman	—	United States	DePaul
6	44	Elmer Tolson	—	United States	Eastern Kentucky
7	53	Herman Sledzik	—	United States	Penn State
8	62	Connie Rea	SG/SF	United States	Centenary College
9	71	Dennis Murphy	SG/SF	United States	Georgetown
10	80	Jack Carby	—	United States	Kansas State
11	88	Don Stemmerich	—	United States	Clarion State
12	95	Russ Johnson	—	United States	DePaul
13	102	Bob Karbach	—	United States	Pepperdine
14	105	Joe Piorkowski	—	United States	Penn State
15	108	Jack Walsh	—	United States	Equitable Life Insurancemen (AAU(?))
16	111	Rich Gott	—	United States	Murray State

For the second time in franchise history, the Baltimore Bullets would obtain the #1 pick in the NBA draft. Unlike the last time they acquired the #1 pick, however, their #1 pick would actually play for the Bullets in the NBA, as well as previously play for another professional basketball team before entering the NBA properly with the Manchester British-Americans in the soon-to-be-defunct American Basketball League (ABL) that the Bullets used to be a part of during its heyday. Their #1 pick of the draft, Ray Felix, would later win the NBA Rookie of the Year Award. In addition to that, they would also trade their second round pick, Don Ackerman, to the New York Knicks as the first ever draft day trade in order to satisfy payment for Ray Lumpp going to Baltimore for cash, though the Bullets also acquired the Milwaukee Hawks' second round pick, Bobby Speight (who never played in the NBA), in a different draft day trade in exchange for the recently rebranded Milwaukee Hawks to pay back Baltimore for several players they previously acquired during the previous season while playing as the Tri-Cities Blackhawks.

== Roster ==
1953–54 Baltimore Bullets roster
Players

Pos.	No.	Player	Height	Weight	DOB	From
G	17	Don Asmonga	6 ft 2 in (1.88 m)	185 lb (84 kg)		Nyack
SF	20	Leo Barnhorst	6 ft 4 in (1.93 m)	190 lb (86 kg)		Notre Dame
SF	14, 16	Bill Bolger	6 ft 5 in (1.96 m)	205 lb (93 kg)		Georgetown
C	25	Ray Felix	6 ft 11 in (2.11 m)	220 lb (100 kg)		Long Island
PF	19, 21	Jim Fritsche	6 ft 8 in (2.03 m)	210 lb (95 kg)		Hamline
SG	18	Rollen Hans	6 ft 2 in (1.88 m)	210 lb (95 kg)		Long Island
PG	11	Paul Hoffman	6 ft 2 in (1.88 m)	195 lb (88 kg)		Purdue
PF	10	Bob Houbregs	6 ft 8 in (2.03 m)	225 lb (102 kg)		Washington
PG	14	James Luisi	6 ft 2 in (1.88 m)	180 lb (82 kg)		St. Francis Brooklyn
F	16	Mo Mahoney	6 ft 2 in (1.88 m)	205 lb (93 kg)		Brown
SG	15	Eddie Miller	6 ft 8 in (2.03 m)	225 lb (102 kg)		Syracuse
PG		Paul Nolen	6 ft 10 in (2.08 m)			Texas Tech
F	19	Bob Peterson	6 ft 5 in (1.96 m)	210 lb (95 kg)		Oregon
G/F	14	Connie Rea	6 ft 3 in (1.91 m)	175 lb (79 kg)		Centenary
SF	12	Al Roges	6 ft 4 in (1.93 m)	195 lb (88 kg)		Long Island
SF	17	Joe Smyth	6 ft 3 in (1.91 m)	215 lb (98 kg)		Niagara
SF	17	Hal Uplinger	6 ft 4 in (1.93 m)	185 lb (84 kg)		Long Island
F/C	24	Mark Workman	6 ft 9 in (2.06 m)	215 lb (98 kg)		West Virginia
SF	10	Max Zaslofsky	6 ft 2 in (1.88 m)	179 lb (81 kg)		St. John's

Coaches
Head coach
- Clair Bee

Legend
- (DP) Unsigned draft pick
- (FA) Free agent
- (S) Suspended
- Injured

== Regular season ==
=== Season standings ===
Eastern Division	W	L	PCT	GB	Home	Road	Neutral	Div
x-New York Knicks	44	28	.611	–	18–8	15–13	11–7	24–16
x-Boston Celtics	42	30	.583	2	17–6	10–19	15–5	25–15
x-Syracuse Nationals	42	30	.583	2	26–6	11–17	5–7	21–19
Philadelphia Warriors	29	43	.403	15	10–9	6–16	13–18	19–21
Baltimore Bullets	16	56	.222	28	12–18	0–22	4–16	11–29

=== Game log ===
1953–54 Game log
#	Date	Opponent	Score	High points	Record
1	October 31	vs. Rochester	72–68	Max Zaslofsky (24)	0–1
2	November 1	Rochester	80–72	Max Zaslofsky (22)	0–2
3	November 4	Minneapolis	77–75	Ray Felix (20)	0–3
4	November 7	vs. Syracuse	88–77	Max Zaslofsky (23)	0–4
5	November 8	Philadelphia	85–75	Leo Barnhorst (15)	0–5
6	November 14	New York	83–88	Max Zaslofsky (19)	1–5
7	November 15	@ New York	79–91	Max Zaslofsky (15)	1–6
8	November 18	Milwaukee	74–104	Leo Barnhorst (22)	2–6
9	November 19	vs. New York	96–85	Max Zaslofsky (24)	2–7
10	November 21	vs. Philadelphia	103–83	Eddie Miller (19)	2–8
11	November 24	@ Philadelphia	80–83	Ray Felix (18)	2–9
12	November 25	vs. Syracuse	58–66	Jim Fritsche (11)	3–9
13	November 26	Rochester	80–75 (OT)	Ray Felix (19)	3–10
14	November 28	Fort Wayne	92–81	Jim Fritsche (24)	3–11
15	November 29	@ Syracuse	82–101	Ray Felix (21)	3–12
16	December 5	@ Rochester	65–72	Ray Felix (19)	3–13
17	December 6	Boston	102–95 (OT)	Eddie Miller (32)	3–14
18	December 9	Syracuse	77–92	Ray Felix (24)	4–14
19	December 10	vs. Philadelphia	83–77	Ray Felix (17)	4–15
20	December 12	@ Boston	75–106	Eddie Miller (17)	4–16
21	December 13	Milwaukee	73–70	Ray Felix (17)	4–17
22	December 17	Minneapolis	64–75	Bob Houbregs (15)	5–17
23	December 19	New York	65–63	Ray Felix (14)	5–18
24	December 20	@ New York	67–75	Ray Felix (18)	5–19
25	December 23	Syracuse	76–72	Ray Felix (23)	5–20
26	December 25	vs. Minneapolis	88–78	Ray Felix (23)	6–20
27	December 29	@ Rochester	77–96	Ray Felix (20)	6–21
28	December 30	New York	79–86	Ray Felix (26)	7–21
29	January 1	@ Milwaukee	52–62	Ray Felix (15)	7–22
30	January 2	Boston	92–77	Ray Felix (23)	7–23
31	January 3	vs. Boston	72–90	Ray Felix (35)	7–24
32	January 4	vs. Boston	77–73	Ray Felix (21)	7–25
33	January 6	Fort Wayne	90–78	Ray Felix (28)	7–26
34	January 7	@ New York	70–82	Ray Felix (32)	7–27
35	January 9	Philadelphia	90–95	Ray Felix (25)	8–27
36	January 10	@ Syracuse	73–77	Eddie Miller (22)	8–28
37	January 12	vs. Fort Wayne	97–66	Ray Felix (18)	8–29
38	January 14	vs. Fort Wayne	81–74	Felix, Roges (15)	8–30
39	January 16	Philadelphia	72–82	Al Roges (22)	9–30
40	January 17	vs. Philadelphia	74–78	Hoffman, Roges (16)	10–30
41	January 23	Syracuse	91–98	Al Roges (23)	11–30
42	January 24	@ Fort Wayne	70–79	Leo Barnhorst (16)	11–31
43	January 26	vs. Boston	94–69	Barnhorst, Houbregs (13)	11–32
44	January 27	@ Minneapolis	73–76	Ray Felix (32)	11–33
45	January 28	vs. Minneapolis	104–82	Al Roges (18)	11–34
46	January 30	Philadelphia	74–80	Felix, Houbregs (13)	12–34
47	February 3	Milwaukee	78–72	Bob Houbregs (16)	12–35
48	February 4	Minneapolis	82–70	Ray Felix (19)	12–36
49	February 6	@ New York	83–98	Ray Felix (24)	12–37
50	February 7	Rochester	73–75	Bob Houbregs (18)	13–37
51	February 8	vs. Boston	87–75	Ray Felix (18)	13–38
52	February 10	vs. Philadelphia	97–79	Al Roges (15)	13–39
53	February 11	@ Minneapolis	82–110	Ray Felix (18)	13–40
54	February 12	vs. Philadelphia	75–72	Rollen Hans (26)	13–41
55	February 13	Boston	93–96	Eddie Miller (27)	14–41
56	February 14	@ Syracuse	91–111	Felix, Miller (20)	14–42
57	February 17	New York	80–84	Al Roges (23)	15–42
58	February 20	Fort Wayne	87–85	Ray Felix (24)	15–43
59	February 21	vs. New York	85–76	Ray Felix (21)	15–44
60	February 22	vs. Boston	111–110 (3OT)	Felix, Houbregs (29)	15–45
61	February 24	Rochester	79–64	Eddie Miller (15)	15–46
62	February 25	vs. Rochester	102–86	Ray Felix (21)	15–47
63	February 27	Minneapolis	95–85	Ray Felix (22)	15–48
64	March 3	Milwaukee	103–100	Paul Hoffman (29)	15–49
65	March 4	vs. Milwaukee	87–95	Rollen Hans (29)	16–49
66	March 6	Fort Wayne	76–71	Paul Hoffman (21)	16–50
67	March 7	@ Syracuse	77–103	Bob Houbregs (20)	16–51
68	March 8	@ Milwaukee	54–64	Eddie Miller (21)	16–52
69	March 8	@ Milwaukee	54–65	Bob Houbregs (14)	16–53
70	March 10	Syracuse	85–77	Ray Felix (16)	16–54
71	March 13	@ Boston	85–97	Ray Felix (21)	16–55
72	March 14	@ Fort Wayne	86–91	Eddie Miller (21)	16–56
