= Clyde Lovellette =

American basketball player (1929–2016)

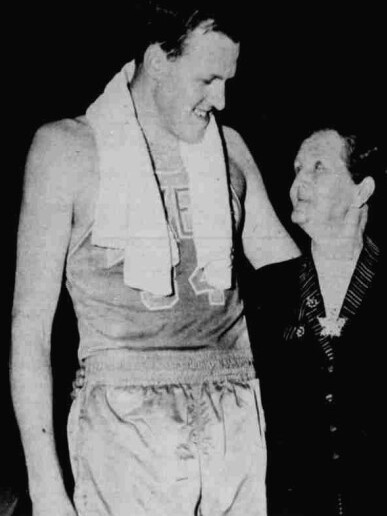
- Lovellette with his mother Myrtle in 1956

Personal information
- Born: September 7, 1929 Petersburg, Indiana, U.S.
- Died: March 9, 2016 (aged 86) North Manchester, Indiana, U.S.
- Listed height: 6 ft 9 in (2.06 m)
- Listed weight: 234 lb (106 kg)

Career information
- High school: Garfield (Terre Haute, Indiana)
- College: Kansas (1949–1952)
- NBA draft: 1952: 1st round, 9th overall pick
- Drafted by: Minneapolis Lakers
- Playing career: 1951–1964
- Position: Center
- Number: 4, 34, 89

Career history
- 1951–1953: Phillips 66ers
- 1953–1957: Minneapolis Lakers
- 1957–1958: Cincinnati Royals
- 1958–1962: St. Louis Hawks
- 1962–1964: Boston Celtics

Career highlights
- 3× NBA champion (1954, 1963, 1964); 4× NBA All-Star (1956, 1957, 1960, 1961); All-NBA Second Team (1956); No. 34 honored by Los Angeles Lakers; NCAA champion (1952); NCAA Final Four MOP (1952); Helms Foundation Player of the Year (1952); 2× Consensus first-team All-American (1951, 1952); Third-team All-American – AP (1950); NCAA scoring champion (1952); No. 16 jersey retired by Kansas Jayhawks

Career NBA statistics
- Points: 11,947 (17.0 ppg)
- Rebounds: 6,663 (9.5 rpg)
- Assists: 1,165 (1.6 apg)
- Stats at NBA.com
- Stats at Basketball Reference
- Basketball Hall of Fame
Medals
Men's basketball
Representing the United States
Olympic Games
Gold medal – first place	1952 Helsinki	Team competition

Clyde Edward Lovellette (/loʊˈvɛlɛt/ loh-VEL-et; September 7, 1929 – March 9, 2016) was an American professional basketball player. Lovellette was inducted into the Naismith Memorial Basketball Hall of Fame in 1988. He was the first basketball player in history to achieve the Triple Crown – playing on an NCAA championship team, Olympics gold medal basketball team, and NBA championship squad.

== Early life ==
Lovellette was born on September 7, 1929, in Petersburg, Indiana, moving to Terre Haute as a child. He attended Garfield High School in Terre Haute, where he was a two-time All-State performer on the school's basketball team. As a high school junior (1946–47), Lovellette's previously undefeated Garfield team, which had won 31 straight games, lost in the Indiana state championship finals to a Shelbyville team led by Bill Garrett (though Lovellette was high scorer with 25 points in the championship game). Lovelette was selected All-State center that year. He was selected to the 1948 Indiana all-star team to play against a team of Kentucky high school all-stars.

== College ==
Lovellette originally committed to play basketball at Indiana University, but University of Kansas and future Naismith Memorial Basketball Hall of Fame head coach Forrest "Phog" Allen persisted in recruiting Lovellette, even traveling to his home in Terre Haute. After visiting Kansas's campus Lovellette was convinced to attend college there and play basketball under Allen. At Kansas, he became a member of the Sigma Chi fraternity. He obtained his bachelor's degree in 1952.

During his three years on the varsity (1949–1952), Lovellette averaged 21.8 points per game as a sophomore, 22.8 points per game as a junior, and 24.8 points per game as a senior. He averaged 7.7, 9.9 and 12.8 rebounds per game over those years, respectively. As a sophomore in 1949–50, he led the Big Seven conference in scoring and was named to All-Big Seven first team. He achieved the same heights as a junior in 1950–51 and senior in 1951–52.

Lovellette led all United States men's college basketball players in scoring his senior year (1951–52) with 28.4 points per game and was named the Helms College Player of the Year. He was a two-time first-team consensus All-American in his junior and senior years. Future major league baseball All-Star and most valuable player Dick Groat of Duke was also selected a first team NCAA All-American basketball player both of those years, along with Lovellette.

Lovelette led the 1951-52 Jayhawks to the 1952 NCAA title, capturing Most Valuable Player honors. He scored a then-NCAA (National Collegiate Athletic Association)-record 141 points in the tournament (35.2 points per game), at a time when the tournament championship team played in four games. He also became the first player to score 40 or more points in an NCAA tournament game when he scored 44 against Saint Louis in a West Region final game on March 22, 1952 (breaking the old record of 31 points set in 1941). In the championship game against St. John's, Lovellette had 33 points and 17 rebounds in Kansas's 80–63 victory, Kansas's, and Allen's, first NCAA championship. He also was named to the All-Tournament Team. St. John's coach Frank McGuire said "'We lost to a great club and Lovellette is a great man".

Lovellette's three-year 1,888 total points set a major college record (passing Dick Groat's 1,886).

Lovellette and basketball legend Dean Smith were teammates at Kansas. He is the only college player to lead the nation in scoring and win the NCAA title in the same year. When Lovellette finished his college career in 1952, Allen, a seminal figure in basketball history who had played under the game's inventor James Naismith, considered Lovellette the greatest player in basketball history.

== Amateur Athletic Union (AAU) ==
Lovelette played in the 1951–52 and 1952–53 seasons for the Bartlesville Phillips 66ers. The 66ers were an Amateur Athletic Union team in the National Industrial Basketball League (NIBL). They won the 1952-53 league championship with a 50–5 record. Lovellette scored 944 points and was on the NIBL All–Star Team. He was the first player to win NCAA, Olympic, AAU and NBA championships. Even though Lovellette committed to play for the 66ers before the 1952 Olympics began, he was able to play in the Olympics because it was an amateur team.

In April 1952, the NBA's Milwaukee Hawks (now the Atlanta Hawks) had offered Lovellette a three-year contract to play professional basketball, which he turned down to play for the 66ers, operated by the Phillips Petroleum Company. The Hawks' coach claimed the 66ers had paid Lovellette's way through Kansas, and questioned Lovellette's being allowed to play in the Olympics. The 66ers responded that the claim was ridiculous, and Lovellette did play in the Olympics. Phog Allen stated that he had been approached by professional teams with offers of payment to convince Lovellette to join professional basketball. However, Allen turned his efforts to convincing Lovellette to choose the 66ers, which would offer greater job security in the long run with a job at Phillips Petroleum once he stopped playing basketball.

== 1952 Olympics ==
Lovellette participated as a member of his Kansas team in the Olympic Basketball Tournament that would provide players to the men's U.S. Olympic basketball team for the 1952 Summer Olympics in Helsinki, Finland. The Olympic team was mostly chosen from the NCAA and AAU champion teams, as opposed to a more selective player by player process from every college and AAU team. Other college teams in the tournament included Southwest Missouri (the NAIA tournament winner), St. John's and LaSalle (the NIT winner). The AAU champion Peoria Caterpillars and Phillips were also included. Peoria defeated Kansas 62–60 in the tournament championship game when Lovellette missed a layup. The 14 players selected to the 1952 team (seven AAU and seven college players) included five from Peoria, seven from Kansas (including Lovellette) and two from the Phillips team.

The Olympic team was coached by the Caterpillar's Warren Womble. Lovellette starred on the gold medal winning team, and was the team's dominating player and leading scorer. In the gold medal game, after having lost once to the U.S. 86–58, the Soviet Union team used a slowed down ball control approach to compete against the U.S. team, which resulted in a low scoring 36–25 victory for the United States. The game was in question until the last three minutes when Lovellette and Phillips 66er Bob Kurland led the American team to the win; Lovellette ending with a game-high nine points. Kurland retired from the Phillips 66ers after the 1952 Olympics (his second Olympics), and Lovellette succeeded him at center.

== Professional basketball career ==
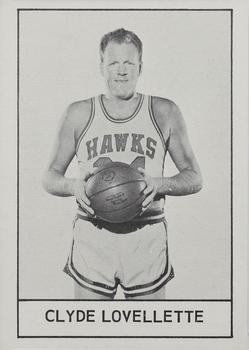
Lovellette in 1961

In the 1952 NBA draft, Lovelette was picked ninth or tenth overall as the first-round pick of the Minneapolis Lakers. In his career, the 6 ft, 9 in (2.06 m) Lovellette fostered the trend of tall, physical, high-scoring centers, who had a higher degree of athleticism than their predecessors. At the professional level, Lovellette became one of the first big men to move outside and utilize the one-handed set shot that extended his shooting range and offensive repertoire. This tactic enabled him to play either the small forward, power forward or center positions, forcing the opposition's big man to play out of position.

=== Minneapolis Lakers ===
Though drafted in 1952, Lovellette did not begin playing in the NBA until the 1953–54 season. He joined the Lakers, who had been NBA champions the previous two seasons. Lovellette initially had no interest in playing for an NBA team. It took Lakers' general manager Max Winter three months of dogged pursuit to convince Lovellette and his wife for Lovellette to sign with the Lakers (which also involved the Hawks giving up draft rights to Lovellette). Playing under future Hall of Fame head coach John Kundla, the Lakers already included future Hall of Fame players George Mikan, Vern Mikkelson, Slater Martin and Jim Pollard.

The 1953-54 Lakers won their third consecutive NBA title. Lovelette was a reserve, backing up Mikan at center. New York Knicks coach Joe Lapchick was concerned that if the Lakers played Mikan and Lovellette at the same time, their dominance would turn NBA basketball into a farce. During the regular season, Lovellette averaged 8.2 points and 5.8 rebounds in 17.4 minutes per game. He averaged 10.4 points per game in the Lakers' seven-game NBA finals victory against the Syracuse Nationals. Mikan suffered knee problems during the year, and retired after winning his final championship (the fifth in six years) with the Lakers; becoming the team's general manager the following season.

Lovellette became the Lakers' starting center in 1954–55. He averaged 18.7 points and 11.5 rebounds per game. The Lakers had a 40–32 regular season record and lost in the Western Division Finals to the Fort Wayne Pistons. Lovellette led the Lakers in scoring against the Pistons with a 16.3 points per game average. The Lakers' record fell to 33–39 the following season, and they lost in the Western Division Semifinals to the St. Louis Hawks. Lovellette averaged 21.5 points and 14 rebounds per game, and was selected to the Western division all-star team. He was also named second-team All-NBA at center, behind Neil Johnston.

In 1956–57, Lovellette had another all-star season, though he did not play in the 1957 all-star game due to injury. He averaged 20.8 points and 13.5 rebounds per game during the regular season. Lovelette led the 34–38 Lakers to the NBA Western Division Finals by averaging a playoffs career best 24.2 points along with 9.4 rebounds per game. Despite performing big, including scoring 33 points and grabbing 9 rebounds in Game 2 of the series, Lovelette and the Lakers were eliminated by future Hall of Fame forward Bob Pettit, former teammate Slater Martin and the St. Louis Hawks three games to none.

=== Cincinnati Royals ===
Less than a week after the 1956-57 NBA season ended with the Celtics winning the championship on April 13, 1957, Lovelette was traded along with Jim Paxson Sr. to the Cincinnati Royals for the first overall pick in the 1957 NBA draft and four players (Monk Meineke, Art Spoelstra, Bob Burrow and Ed Fleming). The Lakers used that first pick to draft Hot Rod Hundley.

Lovellette led the 1957–58 Royals in scoring with 23.4 points per game average, and was second on the team with 12.1 rebounds per game (behind Maurice Stokes's 18.1 rebounds per game). Though not selected to the All-Star team, he was 12th in NBA most valuable player voting. The Royals lost to the Pistons in the Western Division Semifinals. Tragically, Stokes suffered a head injury during the regular season's final game against the Lakers, that a few days later led to his collapse and paralysis from encephalitis after the first playoff game against the Pistons. He never recovered, and died 12 years later at the age of 36.

The Royals and Lovellette were also at an impasse over Lovellette's salary demands for the upcoming season. Lovellette wanted a sizable pay increase and the Royals were unwilling to meet his demands. Without two-thirds of their 1957–58 front-line going into the 1958–59 season, the Royals traded Lovellette to the St. Louis Hawks for recently drafted center and future all-star and Hall of Famer Wayne Embry and four other rookies (Gerry Calvert, Darrell Floyd, Jim Palmer and Ken Sidle).

=== St. Louis Hawks ===
Before the 1958–59 season started, Hawks owner Ben Kerner informed Lovellette that he would play as a reserve on the talented Hawks team. Despite trading five players to obtain Lovellette, Kerner said Lovellette was "'no bed of roses'" and the team had plenty of talented players even without Lovellette. Kerner consulted with Slater Martin and coach Andy Phillip who both encouraged Kerner to trade for Lovellette. The 1958–59 Hawks included Bob Pettit and Martin, as well as another future Hall of Fame forward, Cliff Hagan. During his first season with the Hawks, Lovellette averaged 14.4 points and 8.6 rebounds in less than 23 minutes per game. In the six game Western Division Finals loss to the Lakers, Lovellette averaged 15.3 points per game, third best on the Hawks.

By the next season, Lovellette was the Hawks' starting center, though still playing less than 30 minutes per game. He averaged 20.8 points and 10.6 rebounds per game, and was selected as an all-star for the third time in his career. The Hawks reached the NBA finals, losing to the Boston Celtics in seven games. Lovellette averaged 16.4 points, 10.1 rebounds and 3.9 assists per game in the championship series. Lovellette had played a key offensive role against Hall of Fame defensive great Bill Russell in the Hawks winning Game 6 against the Celtics.

He had another excellent year for the Hawks in 1960–61, finishing 13th in most valuable player voting. He was named starting center on the all-star team (his fourth and last all-star appearance), and had 21 points and 10 rebounds in 31 minutes played in the 1961 All-Star Game. During the regular season, he averaged his Hawks career highs in minutes played per game (31.5), points per game (22), assists per game (2.6); to go along with a 10.1 rebound per game average. The Hawks finished the 1960–61 season with a Western Division best record of 51–28.

After defeating the now Los Angeles Lakers in the 1961 Western Division Finals, four games to three, the Hawks lost again to the Celtics in the NBA finals, four games to one. Lovellette suffered a back injury during the Lakers series, and did not play against the Celtics until Game 3 of the finals, where he scored 16 points in 20 minutes to lead the Hawks to their only victory. Lovelette only played 18 minutes in Game 4 (with 11 points), and 25 minutes in Game 5 (with 15 points).

In 1961–62, his final Hawks season, Lovellette averaged nearly 30 minutes, 21 points and nine rebounds per game; but the Hawks were 29–51 and did not make the playoffs.

=== Boston Celtics and Wilt Chamberlain ===
In October 1962, the Hawks traded the 33-year old Lovellette to the Celtics for cash and a 1963 second-round draft pick. The Hawks were originally going to waive Lovellette, but Celtics coach Red Auerbach asked Kerner to hold off so he could seek a trade for Lovellette. He was Bill Russell's backup at center on the 1962–63 and 1963–64 Celtics' championship teams, averaging 9.3 and 9.7 minutes per game, respectively. He averaged 11 minutes per game in the 1964 championship series against the San Francisco Warriors and Hall of Fame center Wilt Chamberlain.

During the series Chamberlain (a fellow Kansas alumni) had been fouled by Lovellette, the two exchanged words, and Chamberlain punched Lovellette in the mouth hard enough that it brought Lovellette to his knees. Auerbach was furious because he believed Chamberlain should have been ejected automatically for throwing a punch, but was not. Chamberlain said at the time he hit Lovellette he would not have hit Russell, because he liked Russell and did not like Lovellette. Lovellette had developed a reputation as a rough player over the years. Years later, Chamberlain said he did not think he was ejected because Lovellette was widely hated for his rough play.

Lovellette once complained in an interview that Chamberlain, like other super stars, got special treatment from the referees as exemplified by Chamberlain's not being ejected for punching Lovellette. He is quoted as saying "'Wilt Chamberlain once put me down for the count .... I'd been harassing him real good one night, using all the illegal stuff I knew, when he suddenly turned and punched me in the mouth.'" Lovellette said he threw an elbow to Chamberlain's face in retribution in a later game. Coach Frank McGuire thought Lovellette was confused about the timing and believed Chamberlain's punching Lovellette actually was in retribution for Lovellette having injured Chamberlain's jaw years earlier with the blow Lovellette described.

Lovellette was not embarrassed by his rough player image. "'I was not going to be intimidated and I was so mean. ... I caused a lot of controversy as far as roughness goes. I took my lumps and gave them.'"

=== Career ===
In 704 NBA games with the Minneapolis Lakers, Cincinnati Royals, St. Louis Hawks and Boston Celtics, Lovellette scored 11,947 points (averaging 17 points per game) and grabbed 6,663 rebounds (averaging 9.5 rebounds per game). Selected to play in four NBA all-star games, Lovellette was an integral component as a reserve center on championship teams in Minneapolis (1954) and Boston (1963, 1964).

=== Coaching ===
In 1972–73, he coached the Decatur Bullets of the Continental Basketball Association for one season before the team folded. He was paid $150 per game.

== Legacy and honors ==
Lovellette is one of only eight players in history to achieve the basketball Triple Crown – winning an NCAA championship, an NBA championship, and an Olympic gold medal. He was the first player to win NCAA, Olympic, AAU and NBA championships. He also became the first player to win a championship with both the Boston Celtics and Minneapolis/Los Angeles Lakers. Rajon Rondo became the second player ever in 2020.

Lovelette was inducted into the Naismith Memorial Basketball Hall of Fame in 1988. As of 2018, Lovellette is the only player from the 1952 NBA draft to make the Naismith Memorial Basketball Hall of Fame. It has been called the worst draft in NBA history, with Lovellette the only star to come out of that draft.

Lovellette was inducted into the Indiana Basketball Hall of Fame in 1982. He was inducted into the Kansas Sports Hall of Fame in 1996. In 2012, he was inducted into the National Collegiate Basketball Hall of Fame. He has also been selected to the Helms Foundation Hall of Fame.

Lovelette had his No. 16 jersey retired by the University of Kansas.

He was featured in the 1950s All-Star roster on NBA Live 2007.

== Personal ==
Clyde married Sally Wheeler while attending the University of Kansas, though they later divorced. They had three daughters, Cynthia, Linda, and Cherie.

Lovellette announced his retirement from the Celtics in August 1964, at a time when he was running for sheriff of Jefferson County, Missouri. He was defeated in that election by former minor league baseball player Walter Buerger. Two years later he was elected sheriff of Vigo County, Indiana. He owned a small farm, raising and showing cattle. He also engaged in various business activities, eventually getting his master's degree.

At Whites Residential Services, a faith-based school in Wabash County, Indiana for at-risk teenagers, he served for 20 years and was successful in providing a positive influence on their lives.

A summer residence in the Upper Peninsula of Michigan ultimately became a full time residence in the small town of Munising where he served as the Varsity Basketball Assistant Coach and on the Munising City Council.

Lovellette wrote the book The Story of Basketball Great Clyde Lovellette with newspaper sportswriter and author Lew Freedman.

== Death ==
Clyde came back to Indiana as a full-time resident where he eventually died of cancer in North Manchester, at the age of 86, surrounded by his family. At the time of his death he had 13 grandchildren and 15 great-grandchildren.

== NBA career statistics ==
Legend
GP	Games played	GS	Games started	MPG	Minutes per game
FG%	Field goal percentage	3P%	3-point field goal percentage	FT%	Free throw percentage
RPG	Rebounds per game	APG	Assists per game	SPG	Steals per game
BPG	Blocks per game	PPG	Points per game	**Bold**	Career high
†	Won an NBA championship

=== Regular season ===
Year	Team	GP	MPG	FG%	FT%	RPG	APG	PPG
1953–54†	Minneapolis	**72**	17.4	.423	.695	5.8	0.7	8.2
1954–55	Minneapolis	70	33.7	.435	.686	11.5	1.4	18.7
1955–56	Minneapolis	71	35.5	.434	.721	**14.0**	2.3	21.5
1956–57	Minneapolis	69	36.1	.426	.717	13.5	2.0	20.8
1957–58	Cincinnati	71	**36.5**	.441	.743	12.1	1.9	**23.4**
1958–59	St. Louis	70	22.8	.454	.820	8.6	1.3	14.4
1959–60	St. Louis	68	28.7	.468	.821	10.6	1.9	20.8
1960–61	St. Louis	67	31.5	.453	**.830**	10.1	**2.6**	22.0
1961–62	St. Louis	40	29.8	**.471**	.829	8.8	1.7	20.9
1962–63†	Boston	61	9.3	.428	.745	2.9	0.4	6.5
1963–64†	Boston	45	9.7	.420	.789	2.8	0.5	6.7
Career		704	27.1	.443	.757	9.5	1.6	17.0
All-Star		3	23.7	.475	.500	9.3	1.3	13.3

=== Playoffs ===
Year	Team	GP	MPG	FG%	FT%	RPG	APG	PPG
1954†	Minneapolis	13	20.4	.450	.483	9.7	0.5	10.5
1955	Minneapolis	7	28.1	.449	.725	9.1	0.4	16.7
1956	Minneapolis	3	23.0	.487	.594	8.3	2.0	19.0
1957	Minneapolis	5	**36.2**	.432	.731	9.4	2.2	**24.2**
1958	Cincinnati	2	36.0	.387	.643	10.5	0.5	16.5
1959	St. Louis	6	26.8	**.500**	.786	9.8	1.3	15.3
1960	St. Louis	**14**	30.4	.393	.824	**10.8**	**2.8**	17.6
1961	St. Louis	8	23.9	.404	.660	6.5	1.4	15.4
1963†	Boston	6	6.7	.269	.667	0.8	0.2	3.0
1964†	Boston	5	8.0	.235	**1.000**	1.4	0.4	4.0
Career		69	23.8	.416	.684	8.1	1.3	14.0
