= 1953–54 Syracuse Nationals season =

Season for the Nationals in the National Basketball Association

- Head coach: Al Cervi
- Arena: Onondaga War Memorial

Results
- Record: 42–30 (.583)
- Place: Division: 3rd (Eastern)
- Playoff finish: NBA Finals (eliminated 3–4)
- Stats at Basketball Reference
- Radio: WSYR

The 1953–54 Syracuse Nationals season was the 5th season for the franchise in the National Basketball Association (NBA). In the Eastern Division Finals, the Nationals swept the Boston Celtics 2–0 to make it to the NBA Finals. The Nationals would go on to lose the Finals in 7 games to the Minneapolis Lakers.

== Roster ==
1953–54 Syracuse Nationals roster
Players

Pos.	No.	Player	Height	Weight	DOB	From
PF	6	Ed Earle	6 ft 3 in (1.91 m)	190 lb (86 kg)	April 28, 1927	Loyola Chicago
SG	7	Bill Gabor	5 ft 11 in (1.80 m)	170 lb (77 kg)	May 13, 1922	Syracuse
PG	14	Bato Govedarica	5 ft 11 in (1.80 m)	185 lb (84 kg)	April 17, 1928	DePaul
PG	15	Billy Kenville	6 ft 2 in (1.88 m)	187 lb (85 kg)	December 1, 1930	St. Bonaventure
PG	3	George King	6 ft 0 in (1.83 m)	175 lb (79 kg)	August 16, 1928	Charleston (WV)
C	10	Dick Knostman	6 ft 6 in (1.98 m)	215 lb (98 kg)	August 9, 1931	Kansas State
PF	16	Bob Lavoy	6 ft 7 in (2.01 m)	185 lb (84 kg)	June 29, 1926	Western Kentucky
SF	11	Earl Lloyd	6 ft 5 in (1.96 m)	200 lb (91 kg)	April 3, 1928	West Virginia State
PG	12	Al Masino	5 ft 10 in (1.78 m)	174 lb (79 kg)	February 5, 1928	Canisius
C	17	Jim Neal	6 ft 11 in (2.11 m)	235 lb (107 kg)	May 21, 1930	Wofford
PF	6	Mike Novak	6 ft 9 in (2.06 m)	219 lb (99 kg)	April 23, 1915	Loyola Chicago
PF	8	Wally Osterkorn	6 ft 5 in (1.96 m)	215 lb (98 kg)	July 6, 1928	Illinois
C	4	Dolph Schayes	6 ft 8 in (2.03 m)	220 lb (100 kg)	May 19, 1928	NYU
SG	5	Paul Seymour	6 ft 1 in (1.85 m)	180 lb (82 kg)	January 30, 1928	Toledo

Coaches
Head coach

Al Cervi

Legend
- (DP) Unsigned draft pick
- (FA) Free agent
- (S) Suspended
- Injured

Roster

== Regular season ==
=== Season standings ===
Eastern Division	W	L	PCT	GB	Home	Road	Neutral	Div
x-New York Knicks	44	28	.611	–	18–8	15–13	11–7	24–16
x-Boston Celtics	42	30	.583	2	17–6	10–19	15–5	25–15
x-Syracuse Nationals	42	30	.583	2	26–6	11–17	5–7	21–19
Philadelphia Warriors	29	43	.403	15	10–9	6–16	13–18	19–21
Baltimore Bullets	16	56	.222	28	12–18	0–22	4–16	11–29

x – clinched playoff spot

=== Game log ===
1953–54 Game log
#	Date	Opponent	Score	High points	Record
1	October 31	@ Philadelphia	73–79	Paul Seymour (21)	0–1
2	November 1	Philadelphia	61–85	Dolph Schayes (14)	1–1
3	November 5	Minneapolis	77–65	Paul Seymour (14)	1–2
4	November 7	N Baltimore	88–77	Billy Gabor (21)	2–2
5	November 8	Rochester	66–85	Billy Gabor (23)	3–2
6	November 10	@ Milwaukee	74–59	George King (15)	4–2
7	November 12	@ Fort Wayne	74–78	George King (15)	4–3
8	November 14	@ Boston	66–77	Bill Kenville (14)	4–4
9	November 15	Milwaukee	61–69	Dolph Schayes (20)	5–4
10	November 19	Fort Wayne	76–79	George King (15)	6–4
11	November 21	@ New York	67–68	Paul Seymour (15)	6–5
12	November 22	New York	84–80 (OT)	Billy Gabor (26)	6–6
13	November 24	@ Rochester	89–80	Paul Seymour (23)	7–6
14	November 25	N Baltimore	58–66	Dolph Schayes (16)	7–7
15	November 26	Boston	86–93	King, Schayes (15)	8–7
16	November 28	N Boston	80–91	Paul Seymour (16)	8–8
17	November 29	Baltimore	82–101	Billy Gabor (17)	9–8
18	December 1	@ Milwaukee	76–69 (OT)	George King (20)	10–8
19	December 3	N Minneapolis	74–87	Dolph Schayes (16)	10–9
20	December 5	@ Minneapolis	80–90	Dolph Schayes (27)	10–10
21	December 6	@ Fort Wayne	77–78	Paul Seymour (14)	10–11
22	December 9	@ Baltimore	77–92	Paul Seymour (20)	10–12
23	December 10	Milwaukee	76–96	Paul Seymour (18)	11–12
24	December 12	@ Rochester	85–90	George King (17)	11–13
25	December 13	Boston	74–108	Billy Gabor (19)	12–13
26	December 19	@ Boston	90–83	Dolph Schayes (19)	13–13
27	December 20	Minneapolis	76–81	Dolph Schayes (16)	14–13
28	December 23	@ Baltimore	76–72	Schayes, Seymour (16)	15–13
29	December 25	@ New York	80–89	Dolph Schayes (22)	15–14
30	December 27	Milwaukee	75–96	Dolph Schayes (22)	16–14
31	December 30	N Boston	96–89	Earl Lloyd (16)	17–14
32	December 31	Rochester	81–86	Dolph Schayes (20)	18–14
33	January 1	@ Boston	92–95	Dolph Schayes (27)	18–15
34	January 2	@ Philadelphia	74–66	George King (15)	19–15
35	January 3	Philadelphia	90–77	Dolph Schayes (22)	19–16
36	January 5	@ Fort Wayne	72–60	Wally Osterkorn (17)	20–16
37	January 7	Fort Wayne	67–79	Wally Osterkorn (25)	21–16
38	January 10	Baltimore	73–77	Dolph Schayes (19)	22–16
39	January 13	N New York	93–72	Dolph Schayes (19)	23–16
40	January 14	Minneapolis	71–96	King, Osterkorn (17)	24–16
41	January 16	@ Rochester	95–93 (3OT)	Dolph Schayes (30)	25–16
42	January 17	Rochester	81–84	Dolph Schayes (28)	26–16
43	January 23	@ Baltimore	91–98	Paul Seymour (18)	26–17
44	January 24	Philadelphia	80–78	Dolph Schayes (29)	26–18
45	January 26	N Philadelphia	79–75	Paul Seymour (19)	27–18
46	January 28	New York	66–79	Dolph Schayes (17)	28–18
47	January 30	@ New York	65–66	Earl Lloyd (17)	28–19
48	January 31	New York	70–114	Dolph Schayes (27)	29–19
49	February 3	N Philadelphia	79–82	Dolph Schayes (31)	29–20
50	February 4	N New York	90–82	Dolph Schayes (20)	30–20
51	February 6	Fort Wayne	87–93 (OT)	George King (21)	31–20
52	February 7	Milwaukee	73–88	Paul Seymour (19)	32–20
53	February 10	@ Boston	79–94	Dolph Schayes (21)	32–21
54	February 11	@ Philadelphia	74–76 (2OT)	Dolph Schayes (20)	32–22
55	February 13	@ Rochester	78–81	Dolph Schayes (26)	32–23
56	February 14	Baltimore	91–111	Gabor, Neal (18)	33–23
57	February 16	N Philadelphia	77–95	Wally Osterkorn (17)	33–24
58	February 18	Fort Wayne	77–91	Dolph Schayes (28)	34–24
59	February 20	@ Minneapolis	68–83	George King (14)	34–25
60	February 21	Minneapolis	73–100	Billy Gabor (22)	35–25
61	February 23	N Milwaukee	68–70	Dolph Schayes (18)	35–26
62	February 25	Boston	101–96	Dolph Schayes (26)	35–27
63	February 26	@ Milwaukee	68–62	Dolph Schayes (23)	36–27
64	February 28	Rochester	91–85	Paul Seymour (16)	36–28
65	March 2	@ Minneapolis	87–91	Dolph Schayes (30)	36–29
66	March 4	@ Fort Wayne	86–63	Dolph Schayes (19)	37–29
67	March 6	Philadelphia	77–88	Dolph Schayes (24)	38–29
68	March 7	Baltimore	77–103	Dolph Schayes (21)	39–29
69	March 10	@ Baltimore	85–77	Dolph Schayes (24)	40–29
70	March 11	Boston	95–97 (OT)	Dolph Schayes (35)	41–29
71	March 13	@ New York	60–67	Paul Seymour (15)	41–30
72	March 14	New York	83–113	Dolph Schayes (23)	42–30

== Playoffs ==
1954 playoff game log
Division Round Robin Semifinals: 4–0 (home: 2–0; road: 2–0)

Game	Date	Team	Score	High points	High rebounds	High assists	Location	Record
1	March 17	@ Boston	W 96–95 (OT)	Dolph Schayes (20)	Dolph Schayes (13)	Earl Lloyd (8)	Boston Garden	1–0
2	March 18	New York	W 75–68	Dolph Schayes (23)	Dolph Schayes (16)	Paul Seymour (6)	Onondaga War Memorial	2–0
3	March 21	@ New York	W 103–99	Dolph Schayes (36)	Dolph Schayes (21)	Paul Seymour (6)	Madison Square Garden III	3–0
4	March 22	Boston	W 98–85	Dolph Schayes (25)	Dolph Schayes (16)	Paul Seymour (7)	Onondaga War Memorial	4–0

Division Finals: 2–0 (home: 1–0; road: 1–0)

Game	Date	Team	Score	High points	High rebounds	High assists	Location	Series
1	March 25	Boston	W 109–94	Dolph Schayes (27)	Dolph Schayes (21)	Bill Gabor (6)	Onondaga War Memorial	1–0
2	March 27	@ Boston	W 83–76	Wally Osterkorn (16)	—	George King (8)	Boston Garden	2–0

NBA Finals: 3–4 (home: 1–2; road: 2–2)

Game	Date	Team	Score	High points	High rebounds	High assists	Location Attendance	Series
1	March 31	@ Minneapolis	L 68–79	Bob Lavoy (15)	Wally Osterkorn (8)	Paul Seymour (6)	Minneapolis Auditorium; 4,579	0–1
2	April 3	@ Minneapolis	W 62–60	Wally Osterkorn (20)	Wally Osterkorn (17)	Lavoy, Seymour (3)	Minneapolis Auditorium; 6,277	1–1
3	April 4	Minneapolis	L 67–81	Bob Lavoy (18)	Bob Lavoy (15)	Paul Seymour (7)	Onondaga War Memorial; 8,719	1–2
4	April 8	Minneapolis	W 80–69	Paul Seymour (25)	Bob Lavoy (11)	Paul Seymour (6)	Onondaga War Memorial; 7,655	2–2
5	April 10	Minneapolis	L 73–84	Dolph Schayes (17)	Earl Lloyd (8)	Wally Osterkorn (5)	Onondaga War Memorial; 7,283	2–3
6	April 11	@ Minneapolis	W 65–63	Paul Seymour (16)	—	—	Minneapolis Auditorium; 6,776	3–3
7	April 12	@ Minneapolis	L 80–87	Dolph Schayes (18)	—	—	Minneapolis Auditorium; 7,274	3–4

1954 schedule

== Awards and records ==
- Dolph Schayes, All-NBA First Team
- Paul Seymour, All-NBA Second Team
