= 1954 NBA playoffs =

Postseason tournament

Tournament details
- Dates: March 16 – April 12, 1954
- Season: 1953–54
- Teams: 6

Final positions
- Champions: Minneapolis Lakers (5th title)
- Runners-up: Syracuse Nationals
- Semifinalists: Rochester Royals; Boston Celtics

The 1954 NBA playoffs was the postseason tournament of the National Basketball Association's 1953–54 season. The tournament concluded with the Western Conference champion Minneapolis Lakers defeating the Eastern Conference champion Syracuse Nationals 4 games to 3 in the NBA Finals.

For the Lakers, it was their third straight NBA title, and fifth in the last six years.

With the folding of the Indianapolis Olympians after the previous year's playoffs, leaving the NBA with nine teams, they resorted to a round-robin playoff format in 1954 for the only time in league history.

Although the Minneapolis Lakers, Fort Wayne Pistons, Rochester Royals and Syracuse Nationals all play in different cities now (Los Angeles, Detroit, Sacramento and Philadelphia respectively), this is the earliest NBA playoff in which every team that participated still exists today.

== Bracket ==
Division Round Robin Semifinals
E1	New York*	0–4
E2	Boston	2–2
E3	Syracuse	4–0
W1	Minneapolis*	3–0
W2	Rochester	2–1
W3	Fort Wayne	0–4

Division Finals
Eastern Division
E1	Syracuse	2
E2	Boston	0
Western Division
W1	Minneapolis*	2
W2	Rochester	1

NBA Finals
E1	Syracuse	3
W1	Minneapolis*	4

- * Division winner
- Bold Series winner (Division Round Robin Semifinals: top 2 advanced)
- Italic Team with home-court advantage in NBA Finals

== Division Round Robin Semifinals ==
Within each division, the top three teams in the season standings played a double round robin, comprising one home game in each city for each pair of teams, in order to eliminate one of the three participants. A three-way tie with two wins each would have secured home-court advantage in the Division Finals for New York or Minneapolis, who finished first in the season standings, against an opponent to be determined by one further game played with the season runner-up as host. In the event, neither round-robin generated even a two-way tie, so no seventh game was required in either Division. Two of three teams advanced to the Division Finals. The second game between Minneapolis and Rochester—the sixth and final Western Division game scheduled—was not played because both teams had qualified for the Division Final and Minneapolis had secured home-court advantage in that series. The sixth and final Eastern Division game scheduled, Boston at Syracuse, was played because home-court advantage in their subsequent Division Final hadn't been determined. Both teams had won 42 season games and Boston had won by coin flip the edge in case of a tie in the round-robin stage.

=== Eastern Division Round Robin Semifinals ===
==== (1) New York Knicks, (2) Boston Celtics, (3) Syracuse Nationals ====
Eastern Division
Team	W	L
Syracuse Nationals	4	0
Boston Celtics	2	2
New York Knicks	0	4

March 16

Boxscore

Boston Celtics 93, New York Knicks 71
Scoring by quarter: 16–15, 32–12, 24–19, 21–25
Pts: Cousy, Sharman 22 each Asts: Bob Cousy 10	Pts: Carl Braun 18; Asts: Simmons, Baechtold 3 each

Madison Square Garden III, Manhattan, New York
Referees: Sid Borgia, Mendy Rudolph

March 17

Boxscore

Syracuse Nationals 96, Boston Celtics 95 (OT)
Scoring by quarter: 15–17, 18–15, 26–24, 22–25, Overtime: 15–14
Pts: Dolph Schayes 20; Rebs: Dolph Schayes 13; Asts: Earl Lloyd 8	Pts: Bob Cousy 32; Rebs: three players 10 each Asts: Jack Nichols 10

Boston Garden, Boston, Massachusetts

March 18

Boxscore

New York Knicks 68, Syracuse Nationals 75
Scoring by quarter: 15–16, 20–25, 14–19, 19–15
Pts: Harry Gallatin 15; Rebs: Harry Gallatin 20; Asts: Jim Baechtold 5	Pts: Dolph Schayes 23; Rebs: Dolph Schayes 16; Asts: Paul Seymour 6

Onondaga War Memorial, Syracuse, New York

March 20

Boxscore

New York Knicks 78, Boston Celtics 79
Scoring by quarter: 17–15, 24–21, 16–19, 21–24
Pts: Harry Gallatin 15; Asts: Braun, Simmons 3 each	Pts: Bill Sharman 26; Asts: Cousy, Nichols 6 each
Syracuse & Boston clinch berth to Division Finals, New York eliminated

Boston Garden, Boston, Massachusetts

March 21

Boxscore

Syracuse Nationals 103, New York Knicks 99
Scoring by quarter: 22–25, 15–19, 32–26, 34–29
Pts: Dolph Schayes 36; Rebs: Dolph Schayes 21; Asts: Paul Seymour 6	Pts: Carl Braun 32; Rebs: Nat Clifton 16; Asts: Carl Braun 6

Madison Square Garden III, Manhattan, New York
Referees: Jocko Collins, Charles Eckman

- With the Knicks having already been mathematically eliminated from contention, this is the only playoff game to date in which one team had nothing to play for. This contest only contributed towards who would have home-court advantage in the Division Finals between the Nationals and Celtics.

March 22

Boxscore

Boston Celtics 85, Syracuse Nationals 98
Scoring by quarter: 19–27, 23–18, 21–26, 22–27
Pts: Bob Cousy 25; Rebs: Jack Nichols 12; Asts: Bob Cousy 8	Pts: Dolph Schayes 25; Rebs: Dolph Schayes 16; Asts: Paul Seymour 7
Syracuse finishes as East's #1 seed in Division Finals, Boston finishes as the East's #2 seed

Onondaga War Memorial, Syracuse, New York

This was the fourth playoff meeting between the Celtics and Knicks, with the Knicks winning two of the first three meetings.

Previous playoff series
New York leads 2–1 in all-time playoff series

1951

Boston Celtics 0, New York Knicks 2

1951 Eastern Division Semifinals

1952

Boston Celtics 1, New York Knicks 2

1952 Eastern Division Semifinals

1953

Boston Celtics 1, New York Knicks 3

1953 Eastern Division Finals

This was the second playoff meeting between the Celtics and Nationals, with the Celtics winning the first meeting.

Previous playoff series
Boston leads 1–0 in all-time playoff series

1953

Boston Celtics 2, Syracuse Nationals 0

1953 Eastern Division Semifinals

This was the fourth playoff meeting between the Knicks and Nationals, with the Knicks winning two of the first three meetings.

Previous playoff series
New York leads 2–1 in all-time playoff series

1950

New York Knicks 1, Syracuse Nationals 2

1950 Eastern Division Finals

1951

New York Knicks 3, Syracuse Nationals 2

1951 Eastern Division Finals

1952

New York Knicks 3, Syracuse Nationals 1

1952 Eastern Division Finals

=== Western Division Round Robin Semifinals ===
==== (1) Minneapolis Lakers, (2) Rochester Royals, (3) Fort Wayne Pistons ====
Western Division
Team	W	L
Minneapolis Lakers	3	0
Rochester Royals	2	1
Fort Wayne Pistons	0	4

March 16

Boxscore

Fort Wayne Pistons 75, Rochester Royals 82
Scoring by quarter: 13–19, 15–21, 23–14, 24–28
Pts: George Yardley 20	Pts: Bobby Wanzer 18

Edgerton Park Arena, Rochester, New York

March 17

Boxscore

Rochester Royals 88, Minneapolis Lakers 109
Scoring by quarter: 21–29, 17–34, 23–22, 27–24
Pts: Arnie Risen 21	Pts: Slater Martin 24

Minneapolis Auditorium, Minneapolis, Minnesota
Referees: Jocko Collins, Bill Biebel

March 18

Boxscore

Minneapolis Lakers 90, Fort Wayne Pistons 85
Scoring by quarter: 22–21, 19–20, 27–20, 22–24
Pts: George Mikan 28	Pts: Frankie Brian 20
Minneapolis clinches berth to Division Finals

War Memorial Coliseum, Fort Wayne, Indiana

March 20

Boxscore

Fort Wayne Pistons 73, Minneapolis Lakers 78
Scoring by quarter: 19–21, 15–22, 15–15, 24–20
Pts: Max Zaslofsky 15	Pts: George Mikan 21
Minneapolis finishes as the West's #1 seed in Division Finals

Minneapolis Auditorium, Minneapolis, Minnesota
Referees: Sid Borgia, Stan Stutz

March 21

Boxscore

Rochester Royals 89, Fort Wayne Pistons 71
Scoring by quarter: 19–14, 17–14, 26–15, 27–28
Pts: Bobby Wanzer 14	Pts: George Yardley 16
Rochester finishes as the West's #2 seed in Division Finals, Fort Wayne eliminated

War Memorial Coliseum, Fort Wayne, Indiana

- The contest originally scheduled for March 23 (Minneapolis @ Rochester) was not played due to first place finishers owning a tiebreaker, and thus the final positions in the round-robin were already locked in.

This was the fourth playoff meeting between the Lakers and Royals, with the Lakers winning two of the first three meetings.

Previous playoff series
Minneapolis leads 2–1 in all-time playoff series

1949

Minneapolis Lakers 2, Rochester Royals 0

1949 Western Division Finals

1951

Minneapolis Lakers 1, Rochester Royals 3

1951 Western Division Finals

1952

Minneapolis Lakers 3, Rochester Royals 1

1952 Western Division Finals

This was the fifth playoff meeting between the Royals and Pistons, with both teams splitting the first four meetings.

Previous playoff series
Tied 2–2 in all-time playoff series

1950

Fort Wayne Pistons 2, Rochester Royals 0

1950 Central Division Semifinals

1951

Fort Wayne Pistons 1, Rochester Royals 2

1951 Western Division Semifinals

1952

Fort Wayne Pistons 0, Rochester Royals 2

1952 Western Division Semifinals

1953

Fort Wayne Pistons 2, Rochester Royals 0

1953 Western Division Semifinals

This was the third playoff meeting between the Pistons and Lakers, with the Lakers winning the first two meetings.

Previous playoff series
Minneapolis leads 2–0 in all-time playoff series

1950

Fort Wayne Pistons 0, Minneapolis Lakers 2

1950 Central Division Finals

1953

Fort Wayne Pistons 2, Minneapolis Lakers 3

1953 Western Division Finals

== Division Finals ==
=== Eastern Division Finals ===
==== (1) Syracuse Nationals vs. (2) Boston Celtics ====
March 25

Boxscore

Boston Celtics 94, Syracuse Nationals 109
Scoring by quarter: 30–25, 14–28, 22–27, 28–29
Pts: Jack Nichols 28; Rebs: Jack Nichols 9 Asts: Bill Sharman 5	Pts: Dolph Schayes 27; Rebs: Dolph Schayes 21; Asts: Bill Gabor 6
Syracuse leads series, 1–0

Onondaga War Memorial, Syracuse, New York

March 27

Boxscore

Syracuse Nationals 83, Boston Celtics 76
Scoring by quarter: 21–21, 19–29, 24–16, 19–10
Pts: Wally Osterkorn 16; Asts: George King 8	Pts: Bill Sharman 20; Asts: Bob Cousy 6
Syracuse wins series, 2–0

Boston Garden, Boston, Massachusetts

This was the third playoff meeting between these two teams following the round-robin, with both teams splitting the first two meetings.

Previous playoff series
Tied 1–1 in all-time playoff series

1953

Boston Celtics 2, Syracuse Nationals 0

1953 Eastern Division Semifinals

1954

Boston Celtics 0, Syracuse Nationals 2

1954 Eastern Division Round Robin Semifinals

=== Western Division Finals ===
==== (1) Minneapolis Lakers vs. (2) Rochester Royals ====
March 24

Boxscore

Rochester Royals 76, Minneapolis Lakers 89
Scoring by quarter: 17–20, 16–20, 24–24, 19–25
Pts: Wanzer, Coleman 17 each	Pts: George Mikan 28
Minneapolis leads series, 1–0

Minneapolis Auditorium, Minneapolis, Minnesota
Referees: Chuck Eckman, Jocko Collins

March 27

Boxscore

Minneapolis Lakers 73, Rochester Royals 74
Scoring by quarter: 12–16, 16–20, 24–17, 21–21
Pts: George Mikan 17	Pts: Bobby Wanzer 16
Series tied, 1–1

Edgerton Park Arena, Rochester, New York

March 28

Boxscore

Rochester Royals 72, Minneapolis Lakers 82
Scoring by quarter: 21–23, 16–22, 20–20, 15–17
Pts: Arnie Risen 24	Pts: George Mikan 17
Minneapolis wins series, 2–1

Minneapolis Auditorium, Minneapolis, Minnesota
Referees: Jocko Collins, Arnie Heft

This was the fifth playoff meeting between these two teams following the round-robin, with the Lakers winning three of the first four meetings.

Previous playoff series
Minneapolis leads 3–1 in all-time playoff series

1949

Minneapolis Lakers 2, Rochester Royals 0

1949 Western Division Finals

1951

Minneapolis Lakers 1, Rochester Royals 3

1951 Western Division Finals

1952

Minneapolis Lakers 3, Rochester Royals 1

1952 Western Division Finals

1954

Minneapolis Lakers 1, Rochester Royals 0

1954 Western Division Round Robin Semifinals

== NBA Finals: (W1) Minneapolis Lakers vs. (E1) Syracuse Nationals ==
March 31

Boxscore

Syracuse Nationals 68, Minneapolis Lakers 79
Scoring by quarter: 13–10, 18–24, 19–22, 18–23
Pts: Bob Lavoy 15; Rebs: Wally Osterkorn 8 Asts: Paul Seymour 6	Pts: Clyde Lovellette 16; Rebs: George Mikan 10; Asts: Slater Martin 6
Minneapolis leads series, 1–0

Minneapolis Auditorium, Minneapolis, Minnesota
Attendance: 4,579
Referees: Charles Eckman, Joe Serafin

April 3

Boxscore

Syracuse Nationals 62, Minneapolis Lakers 60
Scoring by quarter: 15–15, 13–12, 20–11, 14–22
Pts: Wally Osterkorn 20; Rebs: Wally Osterkorn 17; Asts: Lavoy, Seymour 3 each	Pts: George Mikan 15; Rebs: George Mikan 15; Asts: Vern Mikkelsen 3
Series tied, 1–1

Minneapolis Auditorium, Minneapolis, Minnesota
Attendance: 6,277
Referees: Charles Eckman, Joe Serafin

- Paul Seymour hits the game-winner from 43 feet with 7 seconds left.

April 4

Boxscore

Minneapolis Lakers 81, Syracuse Nationals 67
Scoring by quarter: 24–16, 14–17, 20–11, 23–23
Pts: George Mikan 30; Rebs: George Mikan 15; Asts: Slater Martin 7	Pts: Bob Lavoy 18; Rebs: Bob Lavoy 15; Asts: Paul Seymour 7
Minneapolis leads series, 2–1

Onondaga War Memorial, Syracuse, New York
Attendance: 8,719

April 8

Boxscore

Minneapolis Lakers 69, Syracuse Nationals 80
Scoring by quarter: 14–18, 20–18, 18–21, 17–23
Pts: Whitey Skoog 16; Rebs: Jim Pollard 9 Asts: Slater Martin 6	Pts: Paul Seymour 25; Rebs: Bob Lavoy 11; Asts: Paul Seymour 6
Series tied, 2–2

Onondaga War Memorial, Syracuse, New York
Attendance: 7,655

April 10

Boxscore

Minneapolis Lakers 84, Syracuse Nationals 73
Scoring by quarter: 22–17, 19–14, 21–21, 22–21
Pts: Vern Mikkelsen 21; Rebs: Mikan, Lovellette 13 each Asts: Slater Martin 7	Pts: Dolph Schayes 17; Rebs: Earl Lloyd 8 Asts: Paul Seymour 5
Minneapolis leads series, 3–2

Onondaga War Memorial, Syracuse, New York
Attendance: 7,283

April 11

Boxscore

Syracuse Nationals 65, Minneapolis Lakers 63
Scoring by quarter: 19–27, 19–16, 16–6, 11–14
Pts: Paul Seymour 16	Pts: George Mikan 30
Series tied, 3–3

Minneapolis Auditorium, Minneapolis, Minnesota
Attendance: 6,776
Referees: Charles Eckman, Joe Serafin

April 12

Boxscore

Syracuse Nationals 80, Minneapolis Lakers 87
Scoring by quarter: 14–17, 18–21, 22–27, 26–22
Pts: Dolph Schayes 18	Pts: Jim Pollard 21
Minneapolis wins series, 4–3

Minneapolis Auditorium, Minneapolis, Minnesota
Attendance: 7,274
Referees: Charles Eckman, Joe Serafin

This was the second playoff meeting between these two teams, with the Lakers winning the first meeting.

Previous playoff series
Minneapolis leads 1–0 in all-time playoff series

1950

Minneapolis Lakers 4, Syracuse Nationals 2

1950 NBA Finals
