= Bill Bolger =

American basketball player

Personal information
- Born: August 31, 1931 New York City, New York, U.S.
- Died: October 8, 2009 (aged 78)
- Listed height: 6 ft 5 in (1.96 m)
- Listed weight: 205 lb (93 kg)

Career information
- High school: Xavier (New York City, New York)
- College: Georgetown (1950–1953)
- NBA draft: 1953: 11th round, 89th overall pick
- Drafted by: Milwaukee Hawks
- Playing career: 1953–1954
- Position: Small forward
- Number: 16, 14

Career history
- 1953–1954: Baltimore Bullets

Career statistics
- Points: 56
- Rebounds: 36
- Assists: 11
- Stats at NBA.com
- Stats at Basketball Reference

William J. Bolger (August 21, 1931 – October 8, 2009) was an American basketball player.

He played collegiately for Georgetown University.

He played for the Baltimore Bullets (1953–54) in the NBA for 20 games.

== Career statistics ==
Legend
GP	Games played	GS	Games started	MPG	Minutes per game
FG%	Field goal percentage	3P%	3-point field goal percentage	FT%	Free throw percentage
RPG	Rebounds per game	APG	Assists per game	SPG	Steals per game
BPG	Blocks per game	PPG	Points per game	**Bold**	Career high

=== NBA ===
==== Regular season ====
Year	Team	GP	MPG	FG%	FT%	RPG	APG	PPG
1953–54	Baltimore	20	10.1	.407	.615	1.8	.6	2.8
