= Hal Uplinger =

American basketball player and TV producer (1929–2011)

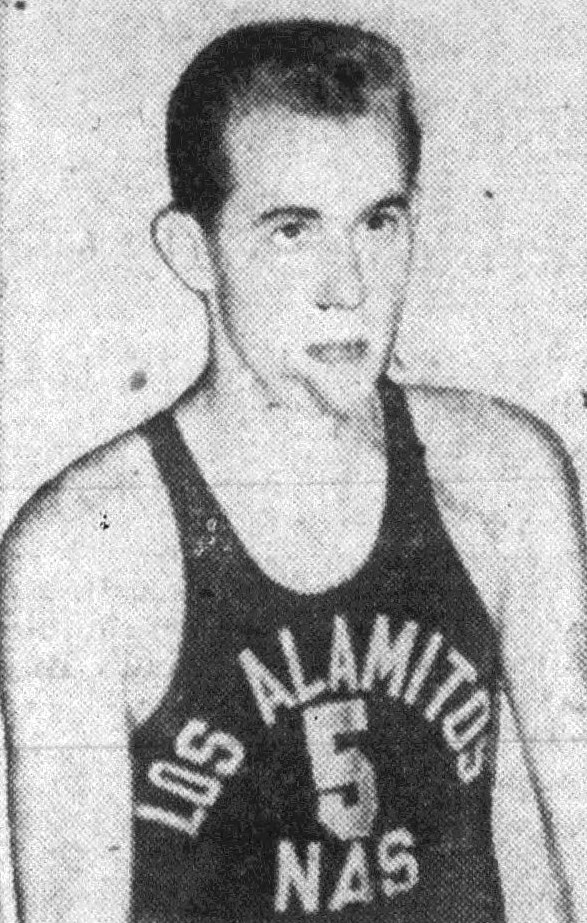
- Uplinger, circa 1951

Personal information
- Born: September 30, 1929 New Kensington, Pennsylvania, U.S.
- Died: February 1, 2011 (aged 81) Los Angeles, California, U.S.
- Listed height: 6 ft 4 in (1.93 m)
- Listed weight: 185 lb (84 kg)

Career information
- High school: John Marshall (Los Angeles, California)
- College: Los Angeles CC (1947–1950); LIU Brooklyn (1950–1953)
- NBA draft: 1953: undrafted
- Position: Shooting guard
- Number: 17

Career history
- 1953: Baltimore Bullets
- Stats at NBA.com
- Stats at Basketball Reference

Harold Francis Uplinger (September 30, 1929 – February 1, 2011) was an American professional basketball player and television producer.

A 6-foot-4-inch (1.93 m) guard from Long Island University, Uplinger spent the 1953–54 NBA season with the Baltimore Bullets, scoring 86 points in 23 games.

He was the Northern League basketball player of the year at John Marshall High School, and an All-Los Angeles City player as well, going on to play for the National Championship Junior College team at Los Angeles City College before playing at L.I.U. for legendary coach Clair Bee. He is the only Marshall High School (opened in 1931) basketball player to ever play in the NBA.

== Television producer ==
He worked for CBS in Los Angeles and New York as the production manager at KCBS, then as sports producer for the CBS Television Network. He produced the American side of Live Aid and was responsible for the international distribution of the 16-hour broadcast to 155 countries and raised $283.7 million for the Band Aid Trust. Uplinger produced many worldwide TV broadcasts mainly using top musical talent promoting humanitarian themes.

He is considered to be the co-founder, along with Tony Verna, of the system used to present instant replays on television.

== Career statistics ==
Legend
GP	Games played	GS	Games started	MPG	Minutes per game
FG%	Field goal percentage	3P%	3-point field goal percentage	FT%	Free throw percentage
RPG	Rebounds per game	APG	Assists per game	SPG	Steals per game
BPG	Blocks per game	PPG	Points per game	**Bold**	Career high

=== NBA ===
==== Regular season ====
Year	Team	GP	MPG	FG%	FT%	RPG	APG	PPG
1953–54	Baltimore	23	11.7	.351	.909	1.3	1.1	3.7
