= 1953–54 Fort Wayne Pistons season =

NBA team season

- Head coach: Paul Birch
- Owner: Fred Zollner
- Arena: War Memorial Coliseum

Results
- Record: 40–32 (.556)
- Place: Division: 3rd (Western)
- Playoff finish: West Division Semifinals (Lost double Round Robin to Lakers and Royals 0–4)
- Stats at Basketball Reference
- Radio: WOWO

The 1953–54 Fort Wayne Pistons season was the Pistons' sixth season in the NBA and 13th season as a franchise.

The Pistons finished 40-32 (.556), 3rd in the Western Division. The team advanced to the playoffs, losing in a Western Division round-robin 4–0 to the Minneapolis Lakers and the Rochester Royals. The team was led on the season by center Larry Foust (15.1 ppg, 13.4 rpg, NBA All-Star), guard Andy Phillip (10.6 ppg, 6.3 apg, NBA All-Star), and first round draft choice Jack Molinas (11.6 ppg, 7.1 rpg, NBA All-Star).

Molinas was named to the All-Star team, having played in 32 games before the league banned him for wagering on Pistons games. Molinas was then suspended at the time of the All-Star game and was replaced by teammate Andy Phillip. He later sued the NBA for US$3,000,000 (equivalent to $35,966,543 in 2025), claiming the league's ban was an unreasonable restraint of trade. Judge Irving Kaufman ruled against him in the case. Molinas would not only be considered an unofficial participant in the 1951 college basketball point-shaving scandal following this revelation, but he would also be considered the main cog of the 1961 NCAA University Division men's basketball gambling scandal years afterward as well.

The Pistons had drafted future Hall of Famer George Yardley in 1950, but they didn't sign him until 1953. Even then, it was a struggle, as Yardley reportedly hated training camp, rejected the initial Fort Wayne offer of US$6,000, electing to playing beach volleyball in California. Yardley then became the first rookie to hold out, until accepting an offer of US$9,500 (equivalent to $113,894 in 2025), and then averaging 9.0 ppg in his NBA rookie season.

== Regular season ==
=== Season standings ===
Western Division	W	L	PCT	GB	Home	Road	Neutral	Div
x-Minneapolis Lakers	46	26	.639	–	20–4	13–15	13–7	19–13
x-Rochester Royals	44	28	.611	2	18–10	12–15	14–3	22–10
x-Fort Wayne Pistons	40	32	.556	6	19–8	11–17	10–7	17–15
Milwaukee Hawks	21	51	.292	25	11–14	5–17	6–20	6–26

x – clinched playoff spot

=== Game log ===
1953–54 Game log
#	Date	Opponent	Score	High points	Record
1	November 1	Milwaukee	67–77	Larry Foust (24)	1–0
2	November 5	Boston	79–83	Fred Scolari (18)	2–0
3	November 7	@ Rochester	76–91	Larry Foust (20)	2–1
4	November 8	New York	75–70	Larry Foust (14)	2–2
5	November 10	N Minneapolis	62–78	Don Meineke (19)	3–2
6	November 12	Syracuse	74–78	Fred Scolari (22)	4–2
7	November 14	@ Philadelphia	58–63	Mel Hutchins (14)	4–3
8	November 15	Rochester	65–68	Andy Phillip (14)	5–3
9	November 17	N Minneapolis	83–66	Larry Foust (16)	5–4
10	November 19	@ Syracuse	76–79	Jack Molinas (24)	5–5
11	November 21	@ Boston	68–90	Fred Scolari (14)	5–6
12	November 22	Rochester	82–83	Larry Foust (17)	6–6
13	November 25	@ Milwaukee	58–64	Jack Molinas (22)	6–7
14	November 26	Milwaukee	64–78	Fred Scolari (15)	7–7
15	November 28	@ Baltimore	92–81	Larry Foust (24)	8–7
16	November 29	Philadelphia	69–83	Larry Foust (22)	9–7
17	December 1	@ Rochester	69–92	Brian, Foust (13)	9–8
18	December 3	Boston	70–76	Larry Foust (26)	10–8
19	December 5	@ New York	92–73	Mel Hutchins (17)	11–8
20	December 6	Syracuse	77–78	Larry Foust (31)	12–8
21	December 9	N Milwaukee	59–83	Andy Phillip (21)	13–8
22	December 13	New York	69–68	Larry Foust (21)	13–9
23	December 15	N Boston	75–82	Jack Molinas (20)	13–10
24	December 16	@ Boston	74–91	Jack Molinas (16)	13–11
25	December 19	@ Milwaukee	69–63	Andy Phillip (24)	14–11
26	December 25	Boston	79–108	Fred Scolari (19)	15–11
27	December 26	@ Minneapolis	71–77	Max Zaslofsky (16)	15–12
28	December 27	Minneapolis	79–75	Mel Hutchins (14)	15–13
29	December 30	@ Minneapolis	97–80	Jack Molinas (17)	16–13
30	December 31	N Philadelphia	56–83	Larry Foust (13)	17–13
31	January 2	@ Rochester	76–77 (OT)	Larry Foust (17)	17–14
32	January 3	New York	74–72	Andy Phillip (29)	17–15
33	January 5	Syracuse	72–60	Larry Foust (16)	17–16
34	January 6	@ Baltimore	90–78	Andy Phillip (14)	18–16
35	January 7	@ Syracuse	67–79	Larry Foust (18)	18–17
36	January 10	Milwaukee	73–81	Andy Phillip (25)	19–17
37	January 12	N Baltimore	97–66	Larry Foust (22)	20–17
38	January 14	N Baltimore	81–74	Larry Foust (15)	21–17
39	January 16	@ New York	82–88 (OT)	Larry Foust (24)	21–18
40	January 17	Minneapolis	83–86	Larry Foust (22)	22–18
41	January 19	N Rochester	73–67	Larry Foust (22)	22–19
42	January 23	@ Minneapolis	72–75	Max Zaslofsky (18)	22–20
43	January 24	Baltimore	70–79	Max Zaslofsky (17)	23–20
44	January 27	N Milwaukee	68–77	Larry Foust (18)	24–20
45	January 28	Boston	68–80	Larry Foust (26)	25–20
46	January 30	@ Rochester	70–95	Max Zaslofsky (15)	25–21
47	January 31	Rochester	69–83	Larry Foust (21)	26–21
48	February 1	@ Milwaukee	72–71	Larry Foust (16)	27–21
49	February 5	N Rochester	89–70	Phillip, Yardley (16)	27–22
50	February 6	@ Syracuse	87–93 (OT)	George Yardley (17)	27–23
51	February 7	Minneapolis	83–90	Mel Hutchins (28)	28–23
52	February 10	N New York	73–69	Foust, Yardley, Zaslofsky (15)	28–24
53	February 13	@ New York	79–73	George Yardley (25)	29–24
54	February 14	Philadelphia	76–94	Frank Brian (19)	30–24
55	February 16	@ Milwaukee	69–65	George Yardley (20)	31–24
56	February 18	@ Syracuse	77–91	Mel Hutchins (18)	31–25
57	February 20	@ Baltimore	87–85	Mel Hutchins (21)	32–25
58	February 21	Milwaukee	64–62	Frank Brian (16)	32–26
59	February 22	N Milwaukee	82–95	Don Meineke (19)	33–26
60	February 25	N New York	62–82	Larry Foust (19)	34–26
61	February 27	@ Philadelphia	79–72	Larry Foust (18)	35–26
62	February 28	Minneapolis	77–94	Larry Foust (20)	36–26
63	March 2	N Rochester	71–64	Larry Foust (19)	36–27
64	March 4	Syracuse	86–63	Larry Foust (25)	36–28
65	March 5	N Philadelphia	70–76	Larry Foust (19)	37–28
66	March 6	@ Baltimore	76–71	Max Zaslofsky (19)	38–28
67	March 7	@ Boston	80–86	Andy Phillip (28)	38–29
68	March 8	N Philadelphia	75–73	Larry Foust (19)	38–30
69	March 10	N Philadelphia	70–88	George Yardley (21)	39–30
70	March 11	Rochester	95–80	Max Zaslofsky (18)	39–31
71	March 13	@ Minneapolis	66–93	Larry Foust (14)	39–32
72	March 14	Baltimore	86–91	Andy Phillip (15)	40–32

== Playoffs ==
1954 playoff game log
Division Round Robin Semifinals: 0–4 (home: 0–2; road: 0–2)

Game	Date	Team	Score	High points	Location	Series
1	March 16	@ Rochester	L 75–82	George Yardley (20)	Edgerton Park Arena	0–1
2	March 18	Minneapolis	L 85–90	Frankie Brian (20)	War Memorial Coliseum	0–2
3	March 20	@ Minneapolis	L 73–78	Max Zaslofsky (15)	Minneapolis Auditorium	0–3
4	March 21	Rochester	L 71–89	George Yardley (16)	War Memorial Coliseum	0–4

1954 schedule
