= Jim Neal =

American basketball player

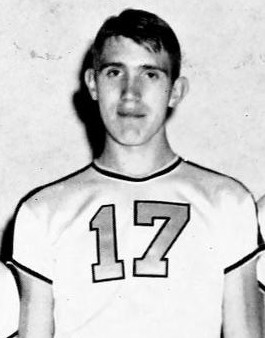

Personal information
- Born: May 21, 1930 Silverstreet, South Carolina, U.S.
- Died: October 3, 2011 (aged 81) Greer, South Carolina, U.S.
- Listed height: 6 ft 11 in (2.11 m)
- Listed weight: 235 lb (107 kg)

Career information
- High school: Silverstreet (Silverstreet, South Carolina)
- College: Wofford (1949–1953)
- NBA draft: 1953: 1st round, 6th overall pick
- Drafted by: Syracuse Nationals
- Position: Center
- Number: 17

Career history
- 1953–1954: Syracuse Nationals
- 1954: Baltimore Bullets
- Stats at NBA.com
- Stats at Basketball Reference

James Ellerbe "Daddy" Neal (May 21, 1930 – October 3, 2011) was an American basketball player who played in the National Basketball Association (NBA).

Neal, a 6'11" center, played college basketball for the Wofford Terriers from 1949 to 1953, leading the NCAA's small colleges in scoring as a senior at 32.6 points per game. For his career, Neal scored 2,078 points (23.3 per game) and had 1,500 rebounds (16.9). He set numerous school records at Wofford, including most points in a game (57), highest scoring average for a season (32.6 PPG) and highest season rebounding average (26.5) At Wofford, Neal received the nickname "Daddy," a reference to his long, thin arms and legs which students compared to a daddy longlegs spider.

Following his graduation from Wofford, Neal was drafted by the Syracuse Nationals with the sixth overall pick of the 1953 NBA draft. He played one season for the Nationals, averaging 4.7 points and 3.8 rebounds in 67 games. Neal played the next season with the Baltimore Bullets, where he averaged 2.9 points and 3.6 rebounds per game until the franchise folded in November 1954.

Neal was inducted into the South Carolina Athletic Hall of Fame in 1990. Neal died on October 3, 2011, in Greer, South Carolina, at the age of 81.

== Career statistics ==
Legend
GP	Games played	GS	Games started	MPG	Minutes per game
FG%	Field goal percentage	3P%	3-point field goal percentage	FT%	Free throw percentage
RPG	Rebounds per game	APG	Assists per game	SPG	Steals per game
BPG	Blocks per game	PPG	Points per game	**Bold**	Career high

=== NBA ===
==== Regular season ====
Year	Team	GP	MPG	FG%	FT%	RPG	APG	PPG
1953–54	Syracuse	**67**	13.4	**.317**	.591	**3.8**	.4	**4.7**
1954–55	Baltimore	13	**14.9**	.203	**.667**	3.6	**.7**	2.9
Career		80	13.7	.301	.601	3.8	.4	4.4

==== Playoffs ====
Year	Team	GP	MPG	FG%	FT%	RPG	APG	PPG
1954	Syracuse	11	9.1	.371	.385	2.5	.2	2.8
