= 1953–54 Minneapolis Lakers season =

Pro basketball team season (won NBA championship)

- NBA champions
- Division champions
- Head coach: John Kundla
- Arena: Minneapolis Auditorium

Results
- Record: 46–26 (.639)
- Place: Division: 1st (Western)
- Playoff finish: NBA champions (Defeated Nationals 4–3)
- Stats at Basketball Reference
- Radio: WLOL

The 1953–54 Minneapolis Lakers season was the sixth season for the franchise in the National Basketball Association (NBA). The Lakers won the Western Division with a 46–26 record. George Mikan was hampered by knee troubles as he averaged only 18.1 points per game. The Lakers signed a promising rookie named Clyde Lovellette, who was able to alleviate the pressure on Mikan. In the first round of the playoffs, the Lakers won three straight to face the Rochester Royals in the Western Finals. The Lakers beat the Royals to qualify for the NBA Finals. In the Finals, the Lakers and Syracuse Nationals alternated wins. In the end, the Lakers emerged with their third straight title, and fifth overall in the franchise's first six seasons in the NBA. They became the first NBA team to win three consecutive NBA championships. In the seventh and final game, the Lakers won by a score of 87–80, for the franchise's final NBA title before their relocation to Los Angeles in 1960. Following the season, Mikan announced his retirement.

The Lakers would not win another NBA championship until 1972.

== Roster ==
1953–54 Minneapolis Lakers roster
Players

Pos.	No.	Player	Height	Weight	DOB	From
PF		Jim Fritsche	6 ft 8 in (2.03 m)	210 lb (95 kg)	1931-12-10	Hamline
G	16	Bob Harrison	6 ft 1 in (1.85 m)	190 lb (86 kg)	1927-08-12	Michigan
SF	12	Jim Holstein	6 ft 3 in (1.91 m)	180 lb (82 kg)	1930-09-24	Cincinnati
C	34−89	Clyde Lovellette	6 ft 9 in (2.06 m)	234 lb (106 kg)	1929-09-07	Kansas
PG	22	Slater Martin	5 ft 10 in (1.78 m)	170 lb (77 kg)	1925-10-22	Texas
C	99	George Mikan	6 ft 10 in (2.08 m)	245 lb (111 kg)	1924-06-18	DePaul
PF	19	Vern Mikkelsen	6 ft 7 in (2.01 m)	230 lb (104 kg)	1928-10-21	Hamline
SF	17	Jim Pollard	6 ft 4 in (1.93 m)	185 lb (84 kg)	1922-07-09	Stanford
SG	18	Pep Saul	6 ft 2 in (1.88 m)	185 lb (84 kg)	1924-02-16	Seton Hall
SF	15−24	Dick Schnittker	6 ft 5 in (1.96 m)	200 lb (91 kg)	1928-05-27	Ohio State
SG	20	Whitey Skoog	5 ft 11 in (1.80 m)	180 lb (82 kg)	1926-11-02	Minnesota

Coaches
Head coach

John Kundla

Legend
- (DP) Unsigned draft pick
- (FA) Free agent
- (S) Suspended
- Injured

Roster

== Regular season ==
=== Season standings ===
Western Division	W	L	PCT	GB	Home	Road	Neutral	Div
x-Minneapolis Lakers	46	26	.639	–	20–4	13–15	13–7	19–13
x-Rochester Royals	44	28	.611	2	18–10	12–15	14–3	22–10
x-Fort Wayne Pistons	40	32	.556	6	19–8	11–17	10–7	17–15
Milwaukee Hawks	21	51	.292	25	11–14	5–17	6–20	6–26

=== Game log ===
#	Date	Opponent	Score	High points	Record
1	October 30	@ Milwaukee	59–69	George Mikan (12)	0–1
2	October 31	@ New York	67–91	George Mikan (16)	0–2
3	November 1	@ Boston	84–79	Jim Pollard (20)	1–2
4	November 4	@ Baltimore	77–75	George Mikan (24)	2–2
5	November 5	@ Syracuse	77–65	Slater Martin (20)	3–2
6	November 7	New York	62–70	George Mikan (22)	4–2
7	November 10	N Fort Wayne	62–78	Slater Martin (12)	4–3
8	November 13	@ Milwaukee	92–84	George Mikan (26)	5–3
9	November 14	@ Rochester	91–98 (3OT)	George Mikan (30)	5–4
10	November 15	N Boston	89–74	Jim Pollard (17)	6–4
11	November 17	N Fort Wayne	83–66	Clyde Lovellette (19)	7–4
12	November 19	@ Philadelphia	107–79	Vern Mikkelsen (24)	8–4
13	November 21	Rochester	70–76	George Mikan (36)	9–4
14	November 22	@ Milwaukee	57–55	George Mikan (24)	10–4
15	November 26	Philadelphia	80–88	George Mikan (23)	11–4
16	November 29	Boston	82–95	George Mikan (28)	12–4
17	December 3	N Syracuse	74–87	George Mikan (27)	13–4
18	December 5	Syracuse	80–90	George Mikan (18)	14–4
19	December 12	New York	67–71	Martin, Mikkelsen (14)	15–4
20	December 13	N Rochester	87–70	Frank Saul (16)	15–5
21	December 15	@ New York	79–80 (OT)	George Mikan (17)	15–6
22	December 16	N Milwaukee	69–63 (OT)	George Mikan (21)	16–6
23	December 17	@ Baltimore	64–75	George Mikan (18)	16–7
24	December 19	@ Rochester	91–78	Slater Martin (20)	17–7
25	December 20	@ Syracuse	76–81	Slater Martin (17)	17–8
26	December 25	N Baltimore	78–88	Vern Mikkelsen (15)	17–9
27	December 26	Fort Wayne	71–77	George Mikan (16)	18–9
28	December 27	@ Fort Wayne	79–75	George Mikan (21)	19–9
29	December 30	Fort Wayne	97–80	George Mikan (17)	19–10
30	January 2	New York	74–78	George Mikan (26)	20–10
31	January 4	N Rochester	85–84	George Mikan (32)	20–11
32	January 7	Rochester	71–89	Mikan, Mikkelsen (20)	21–11
33	January 9	@ Milwaukee	78–67	Lovellette, Mikan (17)	22–11
34	January 10	Boston	85–99	Mikan, Pollard (16)	23–11
35	January 13	@ Boston	84–88	George Mikan (21)	23–12
36	January 14	@ Syracuse	71–96	George Mikan (19)	23–13
37	January 16	Milwaukee	64–58	Clyde Lovellette (12)	23–14
38	January 17	@ Fort Wayne	83–86	Vern Mikkelsen (24)	23–15
39	January 18	N Milwaukee	91–72	Vern Mikkelsen (18)	24–15
40	January 23	Fort Wayne	72–75	George Mikan (16)	25–15
41	January 26	@ Milwaukee	84–69	Lovellette, Martin (14)	26–15
42	January 27	Baltimore	73–76	Jim Pollard (24)	27–15
43	January 28	N Baltimore	104–82	George Mikan (24)	28–15
44	January 30	Milwaukee	64–80	Jim Pollard (13)	29–15
45	January 31	Boston	67–82	Jim Pollard (22)	30–15
46	February 2	@ Rochester	87–78	George Mikan (23)	31–15
47	February 3	N New York	79–91	Frank Saul (18)	32–15
48	February 4	@ Baltimore	82–70	George Mikan (20)	33–15
49	February 6	Philadelphia	94–97	George Mikan (26)	34–15
50	February 7	@ Fort Wayne	83–90	Jim Pollard (18)	34–16
51	February 8	N Philadelphia	91–106	George Mikan (20)	35–16
52	February 9	N Philadelphia	67–70	George Mikan (23)	36–16
53	February 11	Baltimore	82–110	Dick Schnittker (17)	37–16
54	February 12	N Milwaukee	62–71	George Mikan (21)	37–17
55	February 13	N Philadelphia	77–86	George Mikan (27)	38–17
56	February 14	Rochester	77–105	George Mikan (16)	39–17
57	February 16	N Rochester	79–85	Jim Pollard (24)	40–17
58	February 18	Boston	105–92	George Mikan (17)	40–18
59	February 20	Syracuse	68–83	George Mikan (14)	41–18
60	February 21	@ Syracuse	73–100	Lovellette, Mikan, Skoog (14)	41–19
61	February 22	N Philadelphia	79–72	Vern Mikkelsen (17)	41–20
62	February 23	@ New York	100–82	Mikan, Mikkelsen (20)	42–20
63	February 25	@ Philadelphia	72–81	Mikan, Mikkelsen (17)	42–21
64	February 27	@ Baltimore	95–85	George Mikan (29)	43–21
65	February 28	@ Fort Wayne	77–94	Lovellette, Mikan (15)	43–22
66	March 2	Syracuse	87–91	George Mikan (27)	44–22
67	March 5	@ Boston	106–128	George Mikan (30)	44–23
68	March 6	@ Rochester	59–74	George Mikan (15)	44–24
69	March 7	Milwaukee	63–65	Vern Mikkelsen (17)	45–24
70	March 9	N Rochester	70–61	George Mikan (11)	45–25
71	March 10	New York	85–76	Jim Pollard (17)	45–26
72	March 13	Fort Wayne	66–93	Slater Martin (27)	46–26

== Playoffs ==
1954 playoff game log
Division Round Robin Semifinals: 3–0 (home: 2–0; road: 1–0)

Game	Date	Team	Score	High points	Location	Record
1	March 17	Rochester	W 109–88	Slater Martin (24)	Minneapolis Auditorium	1–0
2	March 18	@ Fort Wayne	W 90–85	George Mikan (28)	War Memorial Coliseum	2–0
3	March 20	Fort Wayne	W 78–73	George Mikan (21)	Minneapolis Auditorium	3–0

Division Finals: 2–1 (home: 2–0; road: 0–1)

Game	Date	Team	Score	High points	Location	Series
1	March 24	Rochester	W 89–76	George Mikan (28)	Minneapolis Auditorium	1–0
2	March 27	@ Rochester	L 73–74	George Mikan (17)	Edgerton Park Arena	1–1
3	March 28	Rochester	W 82–72	George Mikan (17)	Minneapolis Auditorium	2–1

NBA Finals: 4–3 (home: 2–2; road: 2–1)

Game	Date	Team	Score	High points	High rebounds	High assists	Location Attendance	Series
1	March 31	Syracuse	W 79–68	Clyde Lovellette (16)	George Mikan (10)	Slater Martin (6)	Minneapolis Auditorium; 4,579	1–0
2	April 3	Syracuse	L 60–62	George Mikan (15)	George Mikan (15)	Vern Mikkelsen (3)	Minneapolis Auditorium; 6,277	1–1
3	April 4	@ Syracuse	W 81–67	George Mikan (30)	George Mikan (15)	Slater Martin (7)	Onondaga War Memorial; 8,719	2–1
4	April 8	@ Syracuse	L 69–80	Whitey Skoog (16)	Jim Pollard (9)	Slater Martin (6)	Onondaga War Memorial; 7,655	2–2
5	April 10	@ Syracuse	W 84–73	Vern Mikkelsen (21)	Mikan, Lovellette (13)	Slater Martin (7)	Onondaga War Memorial; 7,283	3–2
6	April 11	Syracuse	L 63–65	George Mikan (30)	—	—	Minneapolis Auditorium; 6,776	3–3
7	April 12	Syracuse	W 87–80	Jim Pollard (21)	—	—	Minneapolis Auditorium; 7,274	4–3

1954 schedule

== Awards and honors ==
- George Mikan, All-NBA First Team
- Jim Pollard, All-NBA Second Team
- George Mikan, NBA All-Star Game
- Jim Pollard, NBA All-Star Game
- Slater Martin, NBA All-Star Game
