= Don Asmonga =

American basketball and baseball player

Personal information
- Born: February 15, 1928 West Mifflin, Pennsylvania, U.S.
- Died: January 13, 2014 (aged 85)
- Listed height: 6 ft 2 in (1.88 m)
- Listed weight: 185 lb (84 kg)

Career information
- High school: Homestead (Homestead, Pennsylvania)
- College: Alliance College
- Playing career: 1953–1954
- Position: Guard
- Number: 17

Career history
- 1953–1954: Baltimore Bullets
- Stats at NBA.com
- Stats at Basketball Reference

Donald A. Asmonga (February 15, 1928 – January 13, 2014) was an American basketball and baseball player. He played for the NBA's original Baltimore Bullets team during their final season in the league.

A guard, Asmonga played collegiately for the California University of Pennsylvania and also for Alliance College in Cambridge Springs, Pennsylvania. He played for the Baltimore Bullets (1953–54) of the NBA for 7 games. Before that, he had a brief stint with the Boston Red Sox.

== Career statistics ==
Legend
GP	Games played	GS	Games started	MPG	Minutes per game
FG%	Field goal percentage	3P%	3-point field goal percentage	FT%	Free throw percentage
RPG	Rebounds per game	APG	Assists per game	SPG	Steals per game
BPG	Blocks per game	PPG	Points per game	**Bold**	Career high

=== NBA ===
==== Regular season ====
Year	Team	GP	MPG	FG%	FT%	RPG	APG	PPG
1953–54	Baltimore	7	6.6	.133	1.000	.1	.7	.7
