= Rollen Hans =

American basketball player (1931–2021)

Personal information
- Born: April 13, 1931 Los Angeles, California, U.S.
- Died: August 30, 2021 (aged 90) Seattle, Washington, U.S.
- Listed height: 6 ft 2 in (1.88 m)
- Listed weight: 210 lb (95 kg)

Career information
- College: LIU Brooklyn
- Position: Shooting guard

Career history
- 1953–1955: Baltimore Bullets
- Stats at NBA.com
- Stats at Basketball Reference

Rollen Franklin Hans Jr. (April 13, 1931 – August 30, 2021) was an American professional basketball shooting guard who played two season in the National Basketball Association (NBA) as a member of the Baltimore Bullets. He attended Long Island University. He died in Seattle, Washington on August 30, 2021, at the age of 90.

== Career statistics ==
Legend
GP	Games played	GS	Games started	MPG	Minutes per game
FG%	Field goal percentage	3P%	3-point field goal percentage	FT%	Free throw percentage
RPG	Rebounds per game	APG	Assists per game	SPG	Steals per game
BPG	Blocks per game	PPG	Points per game	**Bold**	Career high

=== NBA ===
==== Regular season ====
Year	Team	GP	MPG	FG%	FT%	RPG	APG	PPG
1953–54	Baltimore	**67**	**23.2**	.371	**.561**	**2.4**	**2.7**	**7.2**
1954–55	Baltimore	13	13.7	**.448**	.520	1.2	2.0	5.6
Career		80	21.7	.380	.556	2.2	2.6	7.0
