= Connie Rea =

American basketball player (1931–2020)

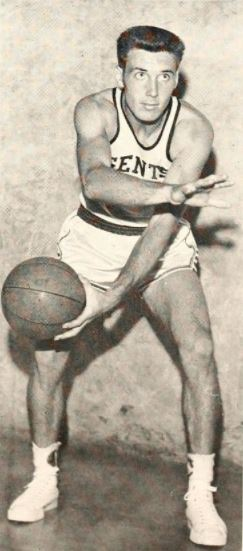
- Rea as a senior at Centenary

Personal information
- Born: January 27, 1931 Marion, Indiana, U.S.
- Died: May 5, 2020 (aged 89) Winter Haven, Florida, U.S.
- Listed height: 6 ft 5 in (1.96 m)
- Listed weight: 195 lb (88 kg)

Career information
- High school: Muncie Central (Muncie, Indiana)
- College: Vanderbilt (1950–1951); Centenary (1951–1953)
- NBA draft: 1953: 8th round, 63rd overall pick
- Drafted by: Baltimore Bullets
- Position: Shooting guard / small forward
- Number: 14

Career history
- 1954: Baltimore Bullets
- Stats at NBA.com
- Stats at Basketball Reference

Connie Mack Rea (January 27, 1931 – May 5, 2020) was an American professional basketball player. Rea was selected in the 1953 NBA draft by the Baltimore Bullets after a collegiate career at Centenary. He was selected to play for the North team in the 1949 North-South Cage Classic.

== Career statistics ==
Legend
GP	Games played	GS	Games started	MPG	Minutes per game
FG%	Field goal percentage	3P%	3-point field goal percentage	FT%	Free throw percentage
RPG	Rebounds per game	APG	Assists per game	SPG	Steals per game
BPG	Blocks per game	PPG	Points per game	**Bold**	Career high

=== NBA ===
==== Regular season ====
Year	Team	GP	MPG	FG%	FT%	RPG	APG	PPG
1953–54	Baltimore	20	7.7	.209	.313	1.6	.8	1.2
