= Bob Peterson (basketball) =

American basketball player

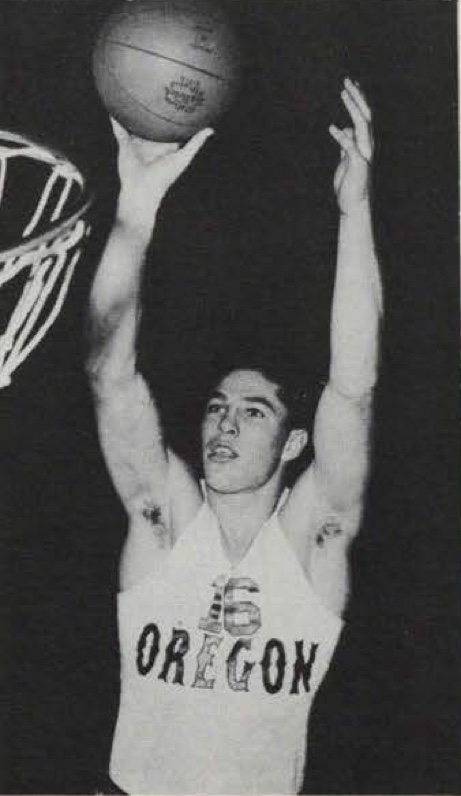
- Peterson as a senior at Oregon

Personal information
- Born: January 25, 1932 Menlo Park, California, U.S.
- Died: July 30, 2011 (aged 79) San Jose, California, U.S.
- Listed height: 6 ft 5 in (1.96 m)
- Listed weight: 210 lb (95 kg)

Career information
- High school: Sequoia (Redwood City, California)
- College: San Mateo (1949–1950); Oregon (1950–1952)
- NBA draft: 1953: 3rd round, 17th overall pick
- Drafted by: Baltimore Bullets
- Position: Power forward / small forward
- Number: 19, 9

Career history
- 1953: Baltimore Bullets
- 1953: Milwaukee Hawks
- 1954–1956: New York Knicks

Career highlights
- First-team All-PCC (1951)
- Stats at NBA.com
- Stats at Basketball Reference

Robert Peterson (January 25, 1932 – July 30, 2011) was an American basketball player. He played three seasons in the National Basketball Association (NBA), from 1953 to 1956.

Peterson, a 6'5" forward from Sequoia High School in Redwood City, California, played collegiately for San Mateo Junior College and the University of Oregon.

Following his college career, Peterson was drafted by the Baltimore Bullets in the 1953 NBA draft. He split his rookie season between the Bullets and the Milwaukee Hawks, averaging 7.5 minutes, 1.9 points and 1.5 rebounds per game in eight contests. He then signed with the New York Knicks prior to the 1954–55 NBA season, sticking with the team for two seasons. Peterson's averaged 4.7 points and 3.8 rebounds per game for his NBA career.

Peterson died of cancer on July 30, 2011.

== Career statistics ==
Legend
GP	Games played	GS	Games started	MPG	Minutes per game
FG%	Field goal percentage	3P%	3-point field goal percentage	FT%	Free throw percentage
RPG	Rebounds per game	APG	Assists per game	SPG	Steals per game
BPG	Blocks per game	PPG	Points per game	**Bold**	Career high

=== NBA ===
==== Regular season ====
Year	Team	GP	MPG	FG%	FT%	RPG	APG	PPG
1953–54	Baltimore	4	9.0	.200	**.833**	.5	.0	1.8
1953–54	Milwaukee	4	6.0	**.400**	.800	2.5	**.8**	2.0
1954–55	New York	37	**13.6**	.367	.667	**4.2**	**.8**	4.2
1955–56	New York	**58**	13.4	.399	.654	3.8	**.8**	**5.3**
Career		103	13.0	.386	.669	3.8	.8	4.7

==== Playoffs ====
Year	Team	GP	MPG	FG%	FT%	RPG	APG	PPG
1954–55	New York	3	23.7	.467	.909	5.3	1.7	8.0
