= Paul Nolen =

American basketball player (1929–2009)

Personal information
- Born: September 3, 1929 Tulia, Texas, U.S.
- Died: May 7, 2009 (aged 79) Fort Worth, Texas, U.S.
- Listed height: 6 ft 10 in (2.08 m)

Career information
- High school: Alvarado (Alvarado, Texas)
- College: Texas Tech (1950–1953)
- NBA draft: 1953: 5th round, 35th overall pick
- Drafted by: Baltimore Bullets
- Position: Center

Career history
- 1953: Baltimore Bullets

Career highlights
- 2× First-team All-Border Conference (1951, 1953); Second-team All-Border Conference (1952)
- Stats at NBA.com
- Stats at Basketball Reference

Paul Edward Nolen (September 3, 1929 – May 7, 2009) was an American basketball player. A 6'10" center, Nolen attended Texas Technological College (now Texas Tech University), where he was a three-time all-conference selection in the Border Conference, including first-team honors as a sophomore and senior. In 1951, he won the Border Conference scoring crown after averaging 19.9 points per game. Over his career with the Raiders, he scored 1,306 points.

Drafted by the Baltimore Bullets with the 35th pick in the 1953 NBA draft, he signed with the team during the summer, and appeared in one NBA game for the team on November 7, 1953. Following hs NBA stint, he played for the Washington Generals, the exhibition team that always plays the Harlem Globetrotters. On December 6, 1953, he scored 6 points in the Generals 49–48 win against the Philadelphia Warriors.

== Career statistics ==
Legend
GP	Games played	GS	Games started	MPG	Minutes per game
FG%	Field goal percentage	3P%	3-point field goal percentage	FT%	Free throw percentage
RPG	Rebounds per game	APG	Assists per game	SPG	Steals per game
BPG	Blocks per game	PPG	Points per game	**Bold**	Career high

=== NBA ===
==== Regular season ====
Year	Team	GP	MPG	FG%	FT%	RPG	APG	PPG
1953–54	Baltimore	1	2.0	.000	–	1.0	.0	.0
