= 1953–54 Philadelphia Warriors season =

NBA professional basketball team season

- Head coach: Edward Gottlieb
- Arena: Philadelphia Civic Center

Results
- Record: 29–43 (.403)
- Place: Division: 4th (Eastern)
- Playoff finish: Did not qualify
- Stats at Basketball Reference
- Radio: WCAU

The 1953–54 Philadelphia Warriors season was the Warriors' 8th season in the NBA.

== Regular season ==
=== Season standings ===
Eastern Division	W	L	PCT	GB	Home	Road	Neutral	Div
x-New York Knicks	44	28	.611	–	18–8	15–13	11–7	24–16
x-Boston Celtics	42	30	.583	2	17–6	10–19	15–5	25–15
x-Syracuse Nationals	42	30	.583	2	26–6	11–17	5–7	21–19
Philadelphia Warriors	29	43	.403	15	10–9	6–16	13–18	19–21
Baltimore Bullets	16	56	.222	28	12–18	0–22	4–16	11–29

x – clinched playoff spot

=== Game log ===
1953–54 Game log
#	Date	Opponent	Score	High points	Record
1	October 31	Syracuse	73–79	Neil Johnston (20)	1–0
2	November 1	@ Syracuse	61–85	Neil Johnston (17)	1–1
3	November 7	Boston	79–77	Joe Graboski (23)	1–2
4	November 8	@ Baltimore	85–75	Neil Johnston (23)	2–2
5	November 10	@ Rochester	66–64	Neil Johnston (26)	3–2
6	November 11	@ Boston	78–72	Davis, George (18)	4–2
7	November 12	@ New York	65–81	Neil Johnston (18)	4–3
8	November 14	Fort Wayne	58–63	Neil Johnston (20)	5–3
9	November 18	@ New York	83–88	Neil Johnston (41)	5–4
10	November 19	Minneapolis	107–79	Neil Johnston (19)	5–5
11	November 21	@ Baltimore	103–83	Neil Johnston (23)	6–5
12	November 24	Baltimore	80–83	Neil Johnston (30)	7–5
13	November 26	@ Minneapolis	80–88	Neil Johnston (34)	7–6
14	November 27	vs. Milwaukee	51–55	Neil Johnston (16)	7–7
15	November 28	vs. Milwaukee	68–71	Joe Graboski (23)	7–8
16	November 29	@ Fort Wayne	69–83	Neil Johnston (28)	7–9
17	December 1	vs. Boston	86–89 (OT)	Neil Johnston (30)	7–10
18	December 3	New York	74–79	Neil Johnston (33)	8–10
19	December 9	Boston	103–104 (OT)	Jack George (23)	9–10
20	December 10	vs. Baltimore	83–77	Neil Johnston (28)	10–10
21	December 17	vs. Rochester	91–79	Neil Johnston (30)	10–11
22	December 20	vs. Boston	89–101	Joe Graboski (32)	10–12
23	December 25	Rochester	73–65	Graboski, Johnston (21)	10–13
24	December 27	@ New York	76–79	Neil Johnston (26)	10–14
25	December 28	vs. Milwaukee	69–63	Joe Graboski (19)	11–14
26	December 31	vs. Fort Wayne	56–83	Neil Johnston (15)	11–15
27	January 1	@ Rochester	76–79	Neil Johnston (21)	11–16
28	January 2	Syracuse	74–66	Neil Johnston (22)	11–17
29	January 3	@ Syracuse	90–77	Neil Johnston (26)	12–17
30	January 5	Milwaukee	88–99	Neil Johnston (33)	13–17
31	January 6	vs. Milwaukee	77–72	Neil Johnston (22)	14–17
32	January 7	vs. Milwaukee	88–73	Neil Johnston (30)	15–17
33	January 9	@ Baltimore	90–95	Walt Davis (25)	15–18
34	January 14	New York	83–71	Neil Johnston (19)	15–19
35	January 16	@ Baltimore	72–82	Neil Johnston (23)	15–20
36	January 17	vs. Baltimore	74–78	Graboski, Zawoluk (15)	15–21
37	January 19	Boston	73–89	Neil Johnston (23)	16–21
38	January 22	vs. New York	82–84	Neil Johnston (32)	16–22
39	January 23	@ Rochester	61–71	Neil Johnston (19)	16–23
40	January 24	@ Syracuse	80–78	Neil Johnston (24)	17–23
41	January 26	vs. Syracuse	79–75	Neil Johnston (16)	17–24
42	January 28	Rochester	82–79 (OT)	Neil Johnston (33)	17–25
43	January 30	@ Baltimore	74–80	Graboski, Johnston (24)	17–26
44	February 3	vs. Syracuse	79–82	Neil Johnston (23)	18–26
45	February 4	Boston	78–80	Joe Graboski (24)	19–26
46	February 5	@ Milwaukee	66–69	Joe Graboski (21)	19–27
47	February 6	@ Minneapolis	94–97	Joe Graboski (23)	19–28
48	February 8	vs. Minneapolis	91–104	Neil Johnston (41)	19–29
49	February 9	vs. Minneapolis	67–70	Neil Johnston (23)	19–30
50	February 10	vs. Baltimore	97–79	Neil Johnston (22)	20–30
51	February 11	Syracuse	74–76 (2OT)	Neil Johnston (22)	21–30
52	February 12	vs. Baltimore	75–72	Joe Graboski (22)	22–30
53	February 13	vs. Minneapolis	77–86	Neil Johnston (28)	22–31
54	February 14	@ Fort Wayne	76–94	Neil Johnston (26)	22–32
55	February 16	vs. Syracuse	77–95	Neil Johnston (50)	23–32
56	February 18	New York	69–60	Neil Johnston (17)	23–33
57	February 20	@ New York	89–75	Zeke Zawoluk (25)	24–33
58	February 21	vs. Boston	85–95	Graboski, Johnston (21)	24–34
59	February 22	vs. Minneapolis	79–72	Neil Johnston (36)	25–34
60	February 25	Minneapolis	72–81	Joe Graboski (31)	26–34
61	February 27	Fort Wayne	79–72	Jack George (20)	26–35
62	February 28	vs. New York	83–78	Neil Johnston (19)	27–35
63	March 1	vs. Milwaukee	78–73	Neil Johnston (33)	28–35
64	March 3	vs. New York	79–88	Neil Johnston (32)	28–36
65	March 4	Rochester	85–78	Neil Johnston (26)	28–37
66	March 5	vs. Fort Wayne	70–76	Neil Johnston (24)	28–38
67	March 6	@ Syracuse	77–88	Neil Johnston (39)	28–39
68	March 8	vs. Fort Wayne	75–73	Neil Johnston (33)	29–39
69	March 10	vs. Fort Wayne	70–88	Zeke Zawoluk (19)	29–40
70	March 12	vs. Boston	95–97 (2OT)	Neil Johnston (36)	29–41
71	March 13	@ Rochester	76–77	Neil Johnston (27)	29–42
72	March 14	@ Boston	92–97	Neil Johnston (23)	29–43

== Awards and records ==
- Neil Johnston, NBA All-Star Game
- Neil Johnston, NBA Scoring Champion
- Neil Johnston, All-NBA First Team
