= Al Roges =

American basketball player

Personal information
- Born: October 25, 1930 Ohio, U.S.
- Died: February 23, 2009 (aged 78) Los Angeles, California, U.S.
- Listed height: 6 ft 4 in (1.93 m)
- Listed weight: 195 lb (88 kg)

Career information
- High school: Roosevelt (Los Angeles, California)
- College: Los Angeles CC (1949–1950); LIU (1950–1951)
- Position: Small forward / shooting guard
- Number: 12, 18

Career history
- 1953–1954: Baltimore Bullets
- 1954–1955: Fort Wayne Pistons
- Stats at NBA.com
- Stats at Basketball Reference

Albert Andreu Roges (October 25, 1930 – February 23, 2009) was an American professional basketball player who played two seasons in the National Basketball Association (NBA). A 6-foot-4-inch (1.93 m) guard/forward, he appeared in 84 games for the Baltimore Bullets and Fort Wayne Pistons between 1953 and 1955, averaging 7.5 points, 2.8 rebounds and 2.1 assists per game. Born in Ohio, he grew up in Los Angeles, California, and played college basketball for Los Angeles City College and Long Island University.

== Early life and college career ==
Roges was born in Ohio on October 25, 1930, and later moved to Los Angeles, California. He attended Roosevelt High School in Los Angeles, where he played high school basketball.

After graduating, Roges spent the 1949–50 season at Los Angeles City College before transferring to Long Island University for the 1950–51 season. At Long Island he played for the Blackbirds men's basketball program during the early National Invitation Tournament era.

== Professional career ==
Roges was not selected in the 1953 NBA draft but signed with the Baltimore Bullets ahead of the 1953–54 season. As a rookie he appeared in 77 games for Baltimore, averaging 8.5 points, 3.2 rebounds and 2.4 assists per game for a team that finished with a 16–56 record.

He returned to the Bullets for the start of the 1954–55 season and played in 13 games before the franchise folded in November 1954. Roges was then selected by the Fort Wayne Pistons in the NBA dispersal draft and made four appearances for the Pistons to close his NBA career. In 84 total NBA games, he averaged 7.5 points, 2.8 rebounds and 2.1 assists in 25.5 minutes per game.

Roges died in Los Angeles, California, on February 23, 2009, at the age of 78.

== Career statistics ==
Legend
GP	Games played	GS	Games started	MPG	Minutes per game
FG%	Field goal percentage	3P%	3-point field goal percentage	FT%	Free throw percentage
RPG	Rebounds per game	APG	Assists per game	SPG	Steals per game
BPG	Blocks per game	PPG	Points per game	**Bold**	Career high

=== NBA ===
==== Regular season ====
Year	Team	GP	MPG	FG%	FT%	RPG	APG	PPG
1953–54	Baltimore	**67**	**28.9**	.358	**.726**	**3.2**	**2.4**	**8.5**
1954–55	Baltimore	13	12.2	**.385**	.647	1.6	1.3	3.9
1954–55	Fort Wayne	4	10.5	.333	.571	.8	.5	2.5
Career		84	25.5	.360	.714	2.8	2.1	7.5
