= 1953–54 Boston Celtics season =

NBA basketball team season

- Head coach: Red Auerbach
- Arena: Boston Arena; Boston Garden

Results
- Record: 42–30 (.583)
- Place: Division: 2nd (Eastern)
- Playoff finish: East Division finals (lost to Nationals 0–2)
- Stats at Basketball Reference
- Radio: WCOP

The 1953–54 Boston Celtics season was the Celtics' eighth season in the NBA.

== Offseason ==
=== NBA draft ===
Round	Pick	Player	Position	Nationality	School/Club team
1	5	Frank Ramsey^	G/F	United States	Kentucky
2	12	Chet Noe	F/C	United States	Oregon
3	21	Cliff Hagan	G/F	United States	Kentucky
7	58	Lou Tsioropoulos	F	United States	Kentucky

== Regular season ==
Eastern Division	W	L	PCT	GB	Home	Road	Neutral	Div
x-New York Knicks	44	28	.611	–	18–8	15–13	11–7	24–16
x-Boston Celtics	42	30	.583	2	17–6	10–19	15–5	25–15
x-Syracuse Nationals	42	30	.583	2	26–6	11–17	5–7	21–19
Philadelphia Warriors	29	43	.403	15	10–9	6–16	13–18	19–21
Baltimore Bullets	16	56	.222	28	12–18	0–22	4–16	11–29

x = clinched playoff spot

=== Game log ===
1953–54 game log
#	Date	Opponent	Score	High points	Record
1	November 1	Minneapolis	84–79	Macauley, Sharman (18)	0–1
2	November 5	@ Fort Wayne	79–83	Bill Sharman (23)	0–2
3	November 7	@ Philadelphia	79–77	Ed Macauley (26)	1–2
4	November 11	Philadelphia	78–72	Ed Macauley (23)	1–3
5	November 14	Syracuse	66–77	Bill Sharman (22)	2–3
6	November 15	N Minneapolis	89–74	Ed Macauley (23)	2–4
7	November 17	N Rochester	92–73	Ed Macauley (16)	2–5
8	November 21	Fort Wayne	77–91	Bob Cousy (14)	3–5
9	November 24	N New York	103–92	Bob Cousy (24)	3–6
10	November 25	New York	84–96	Ed Macauley (28)	4–6
11	November 26	@ Syracuse	86–93	Bill Sharman (24)	4–7
12	November 28	N Syracuse	80–91	Ed Macauley (21)	5–7
13	November 29	@ Minneapolis	82–95	Barksdale, Sharman (16)	5–8
14	December 1	N Philadelphia	86–89 (OT)	Ed Macauley (24)	6–8
15	December 3	@ Fort Wayne	70–76	Ed Macauley (22)	6–9
16	December 5	Milwaukee	79–97	Bob Cousy (22)	7–9
17	December 6	@ Baltimore	102–95 (OT)	Ed Macauley (35)	8–9
18	December 8	@ Rochester	79–97	Bill Sharman (22)	8–10
19	December 9	@ Philadelphia	103–104 (OT)	Bill Sharman (23)	8–11
20	December 10	@ New York	113–108 (2OT)	Bob Cousy (35)	9–11
21	December 12	Baltimore	75–106	Bob Cousy (23)	10–11
22	December 13	@ Syracuse	74–108	Bill Sharman (19)	10–12
23	December 15	N Fort Wayne	75–82	Bill Sharman (27)	11–12
24	December 16	Fort Wayne	74–91	Ed Macauley (25)	12–12
25	December 19	Syracuse	90–83	Macauley, Sharman (18)	12–13
26	December 20	N Philadelphia	89–101	Ed Macauley (21)	13–13
27	December 21	N Milwaukee	74–90	Bob Cousy (26)	14–13
28	December 23	N Milwaukee	74–80	Bob Cousy (26)	15–13
29	December 25	@ Fort Wayne	79–108	Bob Cousy (16)	15–14
30	December 26	@ Milwaukee	67–74	Bob Cousy (23)	15–15
31	December 27	Rochester	72–98	Cousy, Macauley (17)	16–15
32	December 30	N Syracuse	96–89	Bob Cousy (20)	16–16
33	December 31	@ New York	95–74	Ed Macauley (25)	17–16
34	January 1	Syracuse	92–95	Bob Cousy (29)	18–16
35	January 2	@ Baltimore	92–77	Bob Cousy (22)	19–16
36	January 3	N Baltimore	72–90	Bob Cousy (19)	20–16
37	January 4	N Baltimore	77–73	Bob Cousy (25)	21–16
38	January 10	@ Minneapolis	85–99	Ed Macauley (21)	21–17
39	January 13	Minneapolis	84–88	Ed Macauley (27)	22–17
40	January 14	N Milwaukee	74–86	Ed Macauley (26)	23–17
41	January 17	New York	87–84 (2OT)	Bob Cousy (24)	23–18
42	January 19	@ Philadelphia	73–89	Ed Macauley (22)	23–19
43	January 24	Rochester	93–85	Cousy, Macauley (20)	23–20
44	January 26	N Baltimore	94–69	Bill Sharman (19)	24–20
45	January 28	@ Fort Wayne	68–80	Macauley, Sharman (16)	24–21
46	January 29	@ Milwaukee	70–82	Ed Macauley (24)	24–22
47	January 31	@ Minneapolis	67–82	Cousy, Macauley (15)	24–23
48	February 3	Rochester	81–88	Ed Macauley (25)	25–23
49	February 4	@ Philadelphia	78–80	Macauley, Nichols (15)	25–24
50	February 6	@ Rochester	104–81	Bob Cousy (24)	26–24
51	February 7	New York	87–78	Ed Macauley (20)	26–25
52	February 8	N Baltimore	87–75	Bob Cousy (25)	27–25
53	February 10	Syracuse	79–94	Ed Macauley (27)	28–25
54	February 11	N New York	81–84 (OT)	Bob Cousy (33)	29–25
55	February 13	@ Baltimore	93–96	Bob Cousy (26)	29–26
56	February 14	New York	89–103	Bob Cousy (32)	30–26
57	February 16	@ New York	85–87	Ed Macauley (16)	30–27
58	February 18	@ Minneapolis	105–92	Bill Sharman (24)	31–27
59	February 19	@ Milwaukee	78–73	Ed Macauley (20)	32–27
60	February 21	N Philadelphia	85–95	Ed Macauley (27)	33–27
61	February 22	N Baltimore	111–110 (3OT)	Bob Cousy (42)	34–27
62	February 23	N Rochester	93–77	Bill Sharman (26)	34–28
63	February 25	@ Syracuse	101–96	Bill Sharman (26)	35–28
64	February 27	@ Rochester	75–74	Ed Macauley (20)	36–28
65	February 28	N Milwaukee	74–93	Ed Macauley (19)	37–28
66	March 2	@ New York	71–86	Bob Cousy (24)	37–29
67	March 5	Minneapolis	106–128	Ed Macauley (32)	38–29
68	March 7	Fort Wayne	80–86	Bob Cousy (24)	39–29
69	March 11	@ Syracuse	95–97 (OT)	Bob Cousy (24)	39–30
70	March 12	N Philadelphia	95–97 (2OT)	Bob Cousy (35)	40–30
71	March 13	Baltimore	85–97	Bill Sharman (30)	41–30
72	March 14	Philadelphia	92–97	Bob Cousy (30)	42–30

== Playoffs ==
1954 playoff game log
Division Round Robin Semifinals: 2–2 (home: 1–1; road: 1–1)

Game	Date	Team	Score	High points	High rebounds	High assists	Location	Record
1	March 16	@ New York	W 93–71	Cousy, Sharman (22)	—	Bob Cousy (10)	Madison Square Garden III	1–0
2	March 17	Syracuse	L 95–96 (OT)	Bob Cousy (32)	three players tied (10)	Jack Nichols (10)	Boston Garden	1–1
3	March 20	New York	W 79–78	Bill Sharman (26)	—	Cousy, Nichols (6)	Boston Garden	2–1
4	March 22	@ Syracuse	L 85–98	Bob Cousy (25)	Jack Nichols (12)	Bob Cousy (8)	Onondaga War Memorial	2–2

Division finals: 0–2 (home: 0–1; road: 0–1)

Game	Date	Team	Score	High points	High rebounds	High assists	Location	Series
1	March 25	@ Syracuse	L 94–109	Jack Nichols (28)	Jack Nichols (9)	Bill Sharman (5)	Onondaga War Memorial	0–1
2	March 27	Syracuse	L 76–83	Bill Sharman (20)	—	Bob Cousy (6)	Boston Garden	0–2

1954 schedule

== Awards and records ==
- Bob Cousy, All-NBA First Team
- Ed Macauley, All-NBA Second Team
- The 1953-54 Celtics team set the record for the fewest points to assists ratio (3.56) by a team in a season in NBA history, a record that still stands today. This means that the Celtics had a higher percentage of their points being scored off assists (28.08%) than any other team in NBA history.
- Bob Cousy led the league with 7.2 assists per game.
