= Jim Fritsche =

American basketball player (1931–2019)

Personal information
- Born: December 10, 1931 Saint Paul, Minnesota, U.S.
- Died: February 28, 2019 (aged 87) Saint Paul, Minnesota, U.S.
- Listed height: 6 ft 8 in (2.03 m)
- Listed weight: 210 lb (95 kg)

Career information
- High school: Humboldt (Saint Paul, Minnesota)
- College: Hamline (1949–1953)
- NBA draft: 1953: 1st round, 7th overall pick
- Drafted by: Minneapolis Lakers
- Playing career: 1953–1955
- Position: Power forward / center
- Number: 19, 21, 8

Career history
- 1953–1954: Minneapolis Lakers
- 1954: Baltimore Bullets
- 1954–1955: Fort Wayne Pistons

Career NBA statistics
- Points: 326 (3.9 ppg)
- Rebounds: 249 (3.0 rpg)
- Assists: 77 (0.9 apg)
- Stats at NBA.com
- Stats at Basketball Reference

James Alfred Fritsche (December 10, 1931 – February 28, 2019) was an American professional basketball player. Fritsche was selected in the first round of the 1953 NBA draft (7th overall) by the Minneapolis Lakers after a collegiate career at Hamline University. He played two seasons for three teams, the Lakers, Baltimore Bullets and Fort Wayne Pistons.

Fritsche died on February 28, 2019, at age 87.

== Career statistics ==
Legend
GP	Games played	GS	Games started	MPG	Minutes per game
FG%	Field goal percentage	3P%	3-point field goal percentage	FT%	Free throw percentage
RPG	Rebounds per game	APG	Assists per game	SPG	Steals per game
BPG	Blocks per game	PPG	Points per game	**Bold**	Career high

=== NBA ===
==== Regular season ====
Year	Team	GP	MPG	FG%	FT%	RPG	APG	PPG
1953–54	Minneapolis	2	4.0	.000	.250	.0	.0	.5
1953–54	Baltimore	**66**	**18.4**	.309	.750	**3.3**	**1.1**	**4.2**
1954–55	Fort Wayne	16	9.4	**.333**	**.813**	2.0	.3	2.8
Career		84	16.3	.309	.738	3.0	.9	3.9
