= 1953–54 Milwaukee Hawks season =

NBA professional basketball team season

- Head coach: Andrew Levane; Red Holzman
- Arena: Milwaukee Arena

Results
- Record: 21–51 (.292)
- Place: Division: 4th (Western)
- Playoff finish: Did not qualify
- Stats at Basketball Reference
- Radio: WTMJ

The 1953–54 Milwaukee Hawks season was the Hawks' eighth season of existence, their fifth season in the NBA, and their third season in Milwaukee.

== Regular season ==
=== Season standings ===
Western Division	W	L	PCT	GB	Home	Road	Neutral	Div
x-Minneapolis Lakers	46	26	.639	–	20–4	13–15	13–7	19–13
x-Rochester Royals	44	28	.611	2	18–10	12–15	14–3	22–10
x-Fort Wayne Pistons	40	32	.556	6	19–8	11–17	10–7	17–15
Milwaukee Hawks	21	51	.292	25	11–14	5–17	6–20	6–26

x – clinched playoff spot

=== Game log ===
1953–54 Game log
#	Date	Opponent	Score	High points	Record
1	October 30	Minneapolis	59–69	Irv Bemoras (14)	1–0
2	November 1	@ Fort Wayne	67–77	Don Sunderlage (28)	1–1
3	November 4	N New York	73–67	Don Sunderlage (19)	1–2
4	November 6	New York	80–68	Don Sunderlage (17)	1–3
5	November 10	Syracuse	74–59	Bill Tosheff (13)	1–4
6	November 13	Minneapolis	92–84	George Ratkovicz (20)	1–5
7	November 15	@ Syracuse	61–69	Don Sunderlage (14)	1–6
8	November 18	@ Baltimore	74–104	Bob Houbregs (17)	1–7
9	November 19	N Rochester	79–69	Don Sunderlage (16)	1–8
10	November 20	Rochester	81–63	Don Sunderlage (18)	1–9
11	November 22	N Minneapolis	57–55	Bob Houbregs (13)	1–10
12	November 25	Fort Wayne	58–64	Don Sunderlage (24)	2–10
13	November 26	@ Fort Wayne	64–78	Jack Nichols (12)	2–11
14	November 27	N Philadelphia	51–55	Lew Hitch (15)	3–11
15	November 28	N Philadelphia	68–71	Irv Bemoras (23)	4–11
16	December 1	Syracuse	76–69 (OT)	Max Zaslofsky (18)	4–12
17	December 5	@ Boston	79–97	Max Zaslofsky (28)	4–13
18	December 9	N Fort Wayne	59–83	George Ratkovicz (13)	4–14
19	December 10	@ Syracuse	76–96	Bemoras, Zaslofsky (15)	4–15
20	December 11	New York	70–82	Don Sunderlage (21)	5–15
21	December 13	@ Baltimore	73–70	Lew Hitch (17)	6–15
22	December 15	@ Rochester	64–76	Max Zaslofsky (18)	6–16
23	December 16	N Minneapolis	69–63 (OT)	Max Zaslofsky (22)	6–17
24	December 19	Fort Wayne	69–63	Don Lofgran (15)	6–18
25	December 21	N Boston	74–90	Don Lofgran (18)	6–19
26	December 23	N Boston	74–80	Don Sunderlage (23)	6–20
27	December 26	Boston	67–74	George Ratkovicz (16)	7–20
28	December 27	@ Syracuse	75–96	Bill Calhoun (17)	7–21
29	December 28	N Philadelphia	69–63	Lew Hitch (13)	7–22
30	January 1	Baltimore	52–62	Don Sunderlage (12)	8–22
31	January 5	@ Philadelphia	88–99	Bill Calhoun (21)	8–23
32	January 6	N Philadelphia	77–72	Irv Bemoras (15)	8–24
33	January 7	N Philadelphia	88–73	Don Sunderlage (19)	8–25
34	January 9	Minneapolis	78–67	Irv Bemoras (16)	8–26
35	January 10	@ Fort Wayne	73–81	Bill Tosheff (23)	8–27
36	January 12	@ Rochester	73–78	Bill Tosheff (16)	8–28
37	January 14	N Boston	74–86	Don Sunderlage (26)	8–29
38	January 16	@ Minneapolis	64–58	Lew Hitch (16)	9–29
39	January 18	N Minneapolis	91–72	Don Sunderlage (16)	9–30
40	January 19	New York	78–75	Don Sunderlage (19)	9–31
41	January 23	@ New York	63–75	Dick Surhoff (12)	9–32
42	January 24	N New York	66–68	Don Sunderlage (19)	10–32
43	January 26	Minneapolis	84–69	Don Sunderlage (22)	10–33
44	January 27	N Fort Wayne	68–77	George Ratkovicz (14)	10–34
45	January 29	Boston	70–82	Don Sunderlage (19)	11–34
46	January 30	@ Minneapolis	64–80	Lew Hitch (15)	11–35
47	February 1	Fort Wayne	72–71	Chuck Share (22)	11–36
48	February 3	@ Baltimore	78–72	Bill Calhoun (19)	12–36
49	February 5	Philadelphia	66–69	Chuck Share (19)	13–36
50	February 7	@ Syracuse	73–88	Chuck Share (21)	13–37
51	February 9	@ Rochester	70–81	Chuck Share (15)	13–38
52	February 10	Rochester	62–61	Don Sunderlage (18)	13–39
53	February 11	N Rochester	79–68	Bob Harrison (16)	13–40
54	February 12	N Minneapolis	62–71	Don Sunderlage (17)	14–40
55	February 16	Fort Wayne	69–65	Chuck Share (16)	14–41
56	February 19	Boston	78–73	Don Sunderlage (15)	14–42
57	February 20	@ Rochester	64–66	Calhoun, Hitch (16)	14–43
58	February 21	@ Fort Wayne	64–62	Calhoun, Harrison (11)	15–43
59	February 22	N Fort Wayne	82–95	Don Sunderlage (22)	15–44
60	February 23	N Syracuse	68–70	Chuck Share (28)	16–44
61	February 26	Syracuse	68–62	Chuck Share (15)	16–45
62	February 27	@ New York	58–57	Chuck Share (16)	17–45
63	February 28	N Boston	74–93	Chuck Share (26)	17–46
64	March 1	N Philadelphia	78–73	Chuck Share (16)	17–47
65	March 3	@ Baltimore	103–100	Bemoras, Harrison (22)	18–47
66	March 4	N Baltimore	87–95	Don Sunderlage (19)	18–48
67	March 7	@ Minneapolis	63–65	Bill Calhoun (22)	18–49
68	March 8	Baltimore	54–64	Bob Harrison (14)	19–49
69	March 8	Baltimore	54–65	Bob Harrison (18)	20–49
70	March 9	N New York	72–65	Bill Calhoun (15)	20–50
71	March 10	N Rochester	84–69	Chuck Share (23)	20–51
72	March 14	Rochester	53–91	Bill Calhoun (22)	21–51
