= Minneapolis Auditorium =

Former arena in Minneapolis, Minnesota

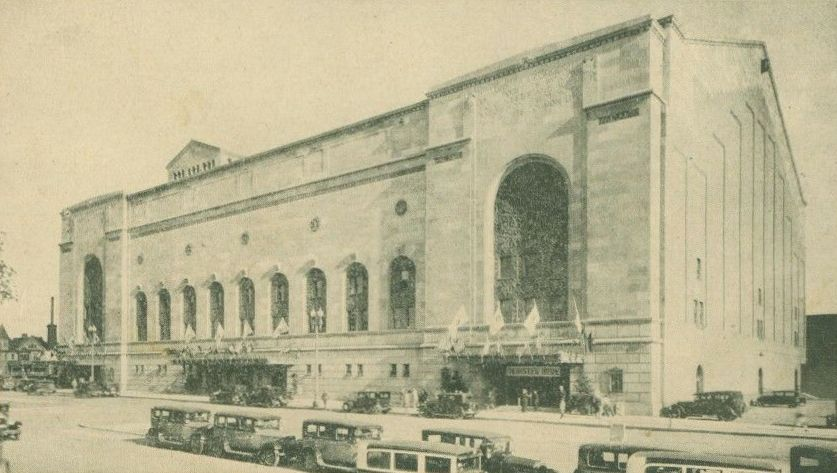
- Minneapolis Auditorium in 1936
- Interactive map of Minneapolis Auditorium
- Location: Minneapolis, Minnesota
- Coordinates: 44.969°N 93.274°W
- Capacity: 10,000

Construction
- Opened: 1927
- Demolished: 1989
- Cost: $3.15 million USD ($58.4 million in 2025 dollars)

Tenants
- Minneapolis Lakers (NBL/BAA/NBA) (1947–1959); Minnesota Fillies (WPBL) (1980–1981)

Minneapolis Auditorium was an indoor arena in Minneapolis, Minnesota. It hosted the NBA's Minneapolis Lakers from 1947 until they moved to the Minneapolis Armory in 1959. The arena held 10,000 people and was built in 1927. By the 1960s, the Auditorium was considered inadequate for hosting major events. As a result, the building was expanded to add a 100,000-square-foot (9,300 m^{2}) Convention Hall capable of accommodating up to 12,000 more people, which opened on September 28, 1965. However, the building fell into obscurity after the opening of the Met Center in suburban Bloomington in 1967. It was demolished in 1989 to make way for the Minneapolis Convention Center. The final event at the old Auditorium was a concert by Marie Osmond on February 26, 1988, and demolition began soon after.

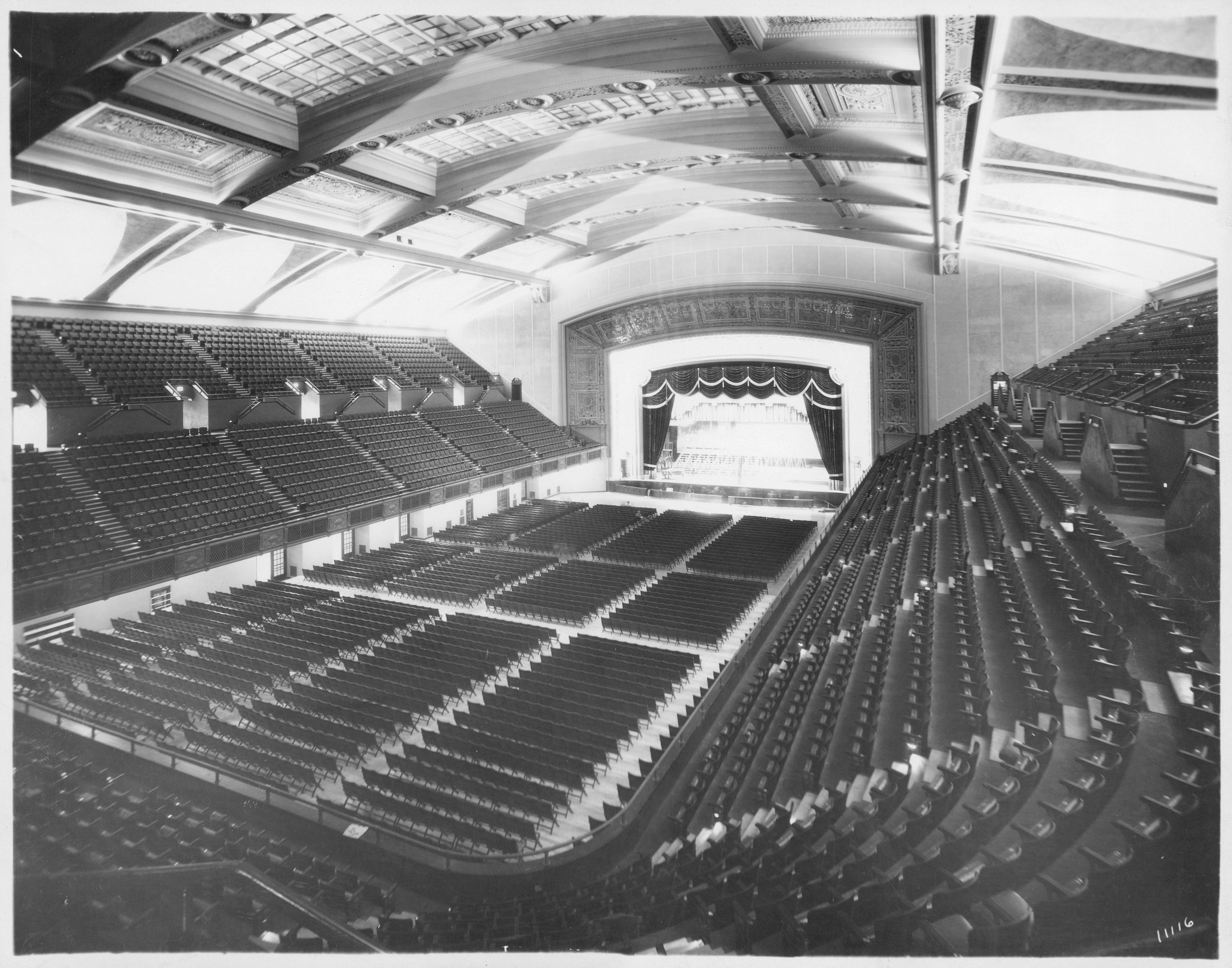
Interior

According to the Minneapolis magazine, when it opened on June 4, 1927, the Auditorium had a seating capacity of 5,687 on its balcony, 4,160 on its floor, and 698 on the stage, for a total of 10,545 (roughly 6,800 for ice hockey or figure skating). The auditorium took two years to construct, cost $3 million (in 1927 dollars), covered an area of 230 by 540 feet (approximately two city blocks), had a stage 50 by 186 feet (15 m × 57 m) in area, and 80-foot (24 m) tall ceiling. Construction of the building took 3.25 million bricks, 15,000 yards of concrete, and 5,000 tons of steel.

Preceded by first arena	Home of the Minneapolis Lakers; 1947 – 1959	Succeeded by Minneapolis Armory
