= Mark Binstein =

American basketball player, coach, and executive

Personal information
- Born: March 31, 1934
- Died: March 9, 2007 (aged 72) Westwood, New Jersey, U.S.
- Listed height: 5 ft 11 in (1.80 m)
- Listed weight: 162 lb (73 kg)

Career information
- College: Army (1953–1956)
- NBA draft: 1956: undrafted
- Position: Guard
- Coaching career: 1965–1972

Career history

Coaching
- 1965–1966: Saint Peter's (assistant)
- 1971–1972: Pittsburgh Condors

Mark Paul Binstein (March 31, 1934 – March 9, 2007) was an American basketball general manager and coach.

Binstein replaced Marty Blake as general manager of the Pittsburgh Condors of the American Basketball Association during the 1970–1971 season. Binstein initiated transactions that brought players Rich Johnson and Arvesta Kelly to the team for that season. Binstein also attempted to bring future Hall of Fame player Connie Hawkins, who once played for the Pittsburgh franchise, back to the team. (Hawkins at the time was playing for the Phoenix Suns of the NBA.) The Condors finished the 1970–1971 season with 36 wins and 48 losses.

Following that season Binstein presided over a complete revamping of the Condors' logo, image and merchandising. Binstein also sought to add All-American Howard Porter to the Condors' roster and the team entered litigation with the NBA's Chicago Bulls over Porter's status. (Porter ended up with the Bulls.)

Ten games into the 1971–72 season Binstein fired Condors head coach Jack McMahon and named himself head coach of the team while also continuing as general manager. The Condors traded away Stew Johnson (to the Carolina Cougars) and Jimmy O'Brien (to the Kentucky Colonels) and finished the season with 25 wins and 59 losses.

== Head coaching record ==
Legend
Regular season	G	Games coached	W	Games won	L	Games lost	W–L %	Win–loss %
Playoffs	PG	Playoff games	PW	Playoff wins	PL	Playoff losses	PW–L %	Playoff win–loss %

=== ABA ===
Team	Year	G	W	L	W–L%	Finish	PG	PW	PL	PW–L%	Result
Pittsburgh	1971–72	74	21	53	.284	6th in Eastern	—	—	—	—	Missed playoffs
