= Headrick =

Headrick may refer to:

- Brent Headrick (born 1997), American baseball player
- Sherrill Headrick (1937–2008), American football player
- Troy Headrick, American politician
- Headrick, Oklahoma, a town in Jackson County
