= 1952–53 Fort Wayne Pistons season =

NBA team season

- Head coach: Paul Birch
- Owner: Fred Zollner
- Arena: War Memorial Coliseum

Results
- Record: 36–33 (.522)
- Place: Division: 3rd (Western)
- Playoff finish: West Division Finals (Lost to Lakers 2–3)
- Stats at Basketball Reference

The 1952–53 Fort Wayne Pistons season was the Pistons' fifth season in the NBA and 12th season as a franchise. The team was tapped to host the 3rd Annual NBA All-Star Game at the War Memorial Coliseum on January 13, 1953.

The Pistons finished the season above .500 at 36-33 (.522), 3rd in the Western Division. The team advanced to the playoffs, defeating the Rochester Royals 2–1 in the opening series, including a 67–65 home nail-biter to take the series, but lost in the division finals 3–2 to the Minneapolis Lakers as each team won at home in the 5-game series. The Pistons were led on the season by center-forward Larry Foust (14.3 ppg, 11.5 rpg, NBA All-Star), guard Andy Phillip (10.0 ppg, 5.0 apg, NBA All-Star) and Don Meineke (10.7 ppg, 6.9 rpg), who would win the inaugural NBA Rookie of the Year Award. First round draft choice Dick Groat (11.9 ppg) would play for the Pistons while finishing his degree at Duke University, left the team in February 1953 to serve in the United States Army and returned to sports in 1955 to pursue a baseball career. Groat became one of 13 players to play in both the NBA and Major League Baseball.

== Draft picks ==
Round	Pick	Player	Position	Nationality	College
1	3	Dick Groat	G	United States	Duke
2	12	Monk Meineke	F	United States	Dayton

== Regular season ==
=== Season standings ===
Western Division	W	L	PCT	GB	Home	Road	Neutral	Div
x-Minneapolis Lakers	48	22	.686	-	24–2	16–15	8–5	17–13
x-Rochester Royals	44	26	.629	4	24–8	13–17	7–1	27–13
x-Fort Wayne Pistons	36	33	.522	11.5	25–9	8–19	3–5	18–22
x-Indianapolis Olympians	28	43	.394	20.5	19–14	4–23	5–6	15–26
Milwaukee Hawks	27	44	.380	21.5	14–8	3–24	10–12	15–26

x – clinched playoff spot

=== Game log ===
1952–53 Game log
#	Date	Opponent	Score	High points	Record
1	November 1	@ Rochester	82–94	Frank Brian (15)	0–1
2	November 2	Minneapolis	81–69	Larry Foust (19)	0–2
3	November 6	Rochester	84–64	Frank Brian (20)	0–3
4	November 9	Indianapolis	71–74	Frank Brian (18)	1–3
5	November 11	@ Indianapolis	63–78	Larry Foust (16)	1–4
6	November 15	@ Milwaukee	68–71	Frank Brian (22)	1–5
7	November 16	New York	83–112	Dick Groat (25)	2–5
8	November 20	Minneapolis	89–81	Fred Schaus (24)	2–6
9	November 22	@ Minneapolis	89–96	Larry Foust (21)	2–7
10	November 23	Philadelphia	80–92	Fred Schaus (22)	3–7
11	November 26	@ Milwaukee	80–72	Don Meineke (19)	4–7
12	November 27	Milwaukee	87–95 (OT)	Dwight Eddleman (24)	5–7
13	November 29	N Boston	71–78	Frank Brian (17)	5–8
14	November 30	Baltimore	95–100 (2OT)	Dwight Eddleman (27)	6–8
15	December 4	Syracuse	78–70	Dwight Eddleman (21)	6–9
16	December 5	@ Indianapolis	74–84	Larry Foust (27)	6–10
17	December 6	@ Baltimore	103–91	Fred Schaus (21)	7–10
18	December 7	New York	91–102	Don Meineke (27)	8–10
19	December 11	Milwaukee	70–71 (OT)	Larry Foust (22)	9–10
20	December 14	Indianapolis	71–86	Larry Foust (27)	10–10
21	December 16	N Philadelphia	64–95	Foust, Groat (18)	11–10
22	December 18	@ Philadelphia	86–79	Larry Foust (22)	12–10
23	December 20	@ Rochester	89–92	Larry Foust (23)	12–11
24	December 21	Philadelphia	71–74	Don Meineke (16)	13–11
25	December 23	@ Indianapolis	59–72	Fred Schaus (14)	13–12
26	December 25	Milwaukee	69–71 (2OT)	Larry Foust (14)	14–12
27	December 27	N New York	91–92	Dick Groat (17)	15–12
28	December 28	Boston	89–66	Frank Brian (19)	15–13
29	December 31	Indianapolis	85–91	Larry Foust (25)	16–13
30	January 1	@ Syracuse	78–92	Larry Foust (22)	16–14
31	January 3	@ Rochester	101–106	Brian, Eddleman, Foust, Groat (13)	16–15
32	January 4	Philadelphia	68–79	Andy Phillip (25)	17–15
33	January 6	@ Milwaukee	71–73	Brian, Foust (17)	17–16
34	January 10	N Minneapolis	84–79	Fred Schaus (20)	17–17
35	January 11	Indianapolis	68–72	Larry Foust (17)	18–17
36	January 15	Boston	85–91	Dwight Eddleman (28)	19–17
37	January 16	N Indianapolis	68–75	Larry Foust (15)	20–17
38	January 18	Rochester	87–90	Dick Groat (22)	21–17
39	January 21	@ Boston	84–94	Frank Brian (21)	21–18
40	January 22	@ Syracuse	75–87	Larry Foust (15)	21–19
41	January 24	@ New York	76–82	Larry Foust (22)	21–20
42	January 25	Milwaukee	62–65	Don Meineke (15)	22–20
43	January 27	N Minneapolis	96–76	Andy Phillip (17)	22–21
44	January 29	Boston	98–111	Larry Foust (21)	23–21
45	January 30	N Rochester	70–68 (OT)	Phillip, Schaus (15)	23–22
46	January 31	@ Minneapolis	80–87	Dick Groat (19)	23–23
47	February 1	Minneapolis	92–76	Frank Brian (16)	23–24
48	February 5	Indianapolis	63–68	Andy Phillip (19)	24–24
49	February 8	Baltimore	78–89	Andy Phillip (19)	25–24
50	February 11	Syracuse	78–96	Frank Brian (20)	26–24
51	February 14	@ Baltimore	102–88	Fred Schaus (20)	27–24
52	February 15	Rochester	84–72	Chuck Share (17)	27–25
53	February 17	@ Rochester	88–78	Andy Phillip (19)	28–25
54	February 19	Baltimore	79–83 (OT)	Fred Scolari (17)	29–25
55	February 21	@ Minneapolis	75–85	Andy Phillip (15)	29–26
56	February 22	Minneapolis	78–90	Andy Phillip (20)	30–26
57	February 24	@ Rochester	91–80	Don Meineke (19)	31–26
58	February 26	@ Syracuse	77–89	Don Meineke (20)	31–27
59	February 28	@ New York	74–85	Larry Foust (20)	31–28
60	March 1	Milwaukee	74–76	Fred Scolari (24)	32–28
61	March 3	N Minneapolis	86–68	Larry Foust (18)	32–29
62	March 4	Syracuse	75–73 (2OT)	Larry Foust (20)	32–30
63	March 6	@ Indianapolis	73–64	Andy Phillip (23)	33–30
64	March 7	@ Baltimore	83–81 (OT)	Brian, Foust, Schaus (15)	34–30
65	March 8	Rochester	71–69	Foust, Phillip, Scolari (13)	34–31
66	March 9	Milwaukee	74–94	Fred Schaus (17)	35–31
67	March 11	@ Boston	92–98	Fred Scolari (26)	35–32
68	March 15	New York	69–81	Fred Schaus (18)	36–32
69	March 17	@ Milwaukee	61–87	Larry Foust (12)	36–33

== Playoffs ==
1953 playoff game log
Division Semifinals: 2–1 (home: 0–1; road: 2–0)

Game	Date	Team	Score	High points	Location	Series
1	March 20	@ Rochester	W 84–77	Fred Schaus (20)	Edgerton Park Arena	1–0
2	March 22	Rochester	L 71–83	Larry Foust (24)	War Memorial Coliseum	1–1
3	March 24	@ Rochester	W 67–65	Larry Foust (18)	Edgerton Park Arena	2–1

Division Finals: 2–3 (home: 2–0; road: 0–3)

Game	Date	Team	Score	High points	Location	Series
1	March 26	@ Minneapolis	L 73–83	Larry Foust (16)	Minneapolis Auditorium	0–1
2	March 28	@ Minneapolis	L 75–82	Larry Foust (21)	Minneapolis Auditorium	0–2
3	March 30	Minneapolis	W 98–95	Fred Scolari (27)	War Memorial Coliseum	1–2
4	April 1	Minneapolis	W 85–82	Larry Foust (20)	War Memorial Coliseum	2–2
5	April 2	@ Minneapolis	L 58–74	Larry Foust (16)	Minneapolis Auditorium	2–3

1953 schedule

== Awards and records ==
- Don Meineke, NBA Rookie of the Year Award

== See also ==
- 1952-53 NBA season
