= Robert Priddy =

Robert Priddy may refer to:

- Robert L. Priddy, American co-founder of several airline companies
- Bob Priddy (baseball) (1939–2023), American baseball player from 1962 to 1971
- Bob Priddy (basketball) (1930–2021), American basketball player for the Baltimore Bullets and Wilkes-Barre Barons in 1952-53
