= Mel Payton =

American basketball player (1926–2001)

Personal information
- Born: July 16, 1926 Martinsville, Indiana, U.S.
- Died: May 12, 2001 (aged 74) Carmel, Indiana, U.S.
- Listed height: 6 ft 4 in (1.93 m)
- Listed weight: 185 lb (84 kg)

Career information
- High school: Martinsville (Martinsville, Indiana)
- College: Tulane (1947–1951)
- NBA draft: 1951: 2nd round, 18th overall pick
- Drafted by: Philadelphia Warriors
- Playing career: 1951–1953
- Position: Small forward
- Number: 18, 16

Career history
- 1951–1952: Philadelphia Warriors
- 1952–1953: Indianapolis Olympians

Career highlights
- First-team All-SEC (1951); Second-team All-SEC (1950)

Career NBA statistics
- Points: 595 (5.4 ppg)
- Rebounds: 396 (3.6 rpg)
- Assists: 126 (1.1 apg)
- Stats at NBA.com
- Stats at Basketball Reference

Melvin Eugene Payton (July 16, 1926 – May 12, 2001) was an American professional basketball player born in Martinsville, Indiana. A 6'4" small forward, Payton attended college at Tulane University. He played for four years for the Tulane Green Wave, averaging 11.8 points per game. Payton was selected in the second round (19th pick overall) of 1951 NBA draft by the Philadelphia Warriors. He played one season with the Warriors before being traded to the Indianapolis Olympians in exchange for Don Lofgran. Payton played 111 games in his two-year career, scoring 595 points, grabbing 396 rebounds, and playing 1,895 minutes.

== Career statistics ==
Legend
GP	Games played	GS	Games started	MPG	Minutes per game
FG%	Field goal percentage	3P%	3-point field goal percentage	FT%	Free throw percentage
RPG	Rebounds per game	APG	Assists per game	SPG	Steals per game
BPG	Blocks per game	PPG	Points per game	**Bold**	Career high

=== NBA ===
==== Regular season ====
Year	Team	MPG	GP	FG%	FT%	RPG	APG	PPG
1951–52	Philadelphia	45	10.5	**.386**	**.750**	1.8	1.0	2.9
1952–53	Indianapolis	**66**	**21.6**	.357	.745	**4.7**	**1.2**	**7.1**
Career		111	17.1	.363	.746	3.6	1.1	5.4

==== Playoffs ====
Year	Team	MPG	GP	FG%	FT%	RPG	APG	PPG
1952	Philadelphia	**3**	6.0	**.500**	**1.000**	1.0	**.3**	1.3
1953	Indianapolis	2	**18.0**	.412	.875	**3.0**	.0	**10.5**
Career		5	10.8	.421	.900	1.8	.2	5.0
