= Norm Swanson =

American basketball player (1930–2016)

Personal information
- Born: October 4, 1930 Chicago, Illinois, U.S.
- Died: November 24, 2016 (aged 86) Indian Shores, Florida, U.S.
- Listed height: 6 ft 6 in (1.98 m)
- Listed weight: 210 lb (95 kg)

Career information
- High school: Carl Schurz (Chicago, Illinois)
- College: Detroit Mercy (1949–1953)
- NBA draft: 1953: – round, –
- Drafted by: Rochester Royals
- Playing career: 1953–1954
- Position: Small forward
- Number: 12

Career history
- 1953–1954: Rochester Royals

Career highlights
- First-team All-MVC (1952)
- Stats at NBA.com
- Stats at Basketball Reference

Norman Paul Swanson (October 4, 1930 – November 24, 2016) was an American professional basketball player. Swanson was selected in the 1953 NBA draft by the Rochester Royals after a collegiate career at Detroit. He played for one season and averaged 1.6 points, 1.7 rebounds and 0.5 assists per game.

== Career statistics ==
Legend
| GP | Games played | GS | Games started | MPG | Minutes per game |
| FG% | Field goal percentage | 3P% | 3-point field goal percentage | FT% | Free throw percentage |
| RPG | Rebounds per game | APG | Assists per game | SPG | Steals per game |
| BPG | Blocks per game | PPG | Points per game | **Bold** | Career high |

=== NBA ===
==== Regular season ====
| Year | Team | GP | MPG | FG% | FT% | RPG | APG | PPG |
|---|---|---|---|---|---|---|---|---|
| 1953–54 | Rochester | 63 | 9.7 | .226 | .594 | 1.7 | .5 | 1.6 |

==== Playoffs ====
| Year | Team | GP | MPG | FG% | FT% | RPG | APG | PPG |
|---|---|---|---|---|---|---|---|---|
| 1954 | Rochester | 6 | 3.8 | .429 | .667 | .8 | .0 | 1.3 |
