= 1952–53 Rochester Royals season =

NBA professional basketball team season

- Head coach: Les Harrison
- Owners: Jack Harrison; Les Harrison
- Arena: Edgerton Park Arena

Results
- Record: 44–26 (.629)
- Place: Division: 2nd (Western)
- Playoff finish: West Division Semi-finals (eliminated 1–2)
- Stats at Basketball Reference
- Radio: WHAM

The 1952–53 Rochester Royals season was the Royals fifth season in the NBA.

== Draft picks ==
Round	Pick	Player	Position	Nationality	College

== Regular season ==
=== Season standings ===
Western Division	W	L	PCT	GB	Home	Road	Neutral	Div
x-Minneapolis Lakers	48	22	.686	-	24–2	16–15	8–5	17–13
x-Rochester Royals	44	26	.629	4	24–8	13–17	7–1	27–13
x-Fort Wayne Pistons	36	33	.522	11.5	25–9	8–19	3–5	18–22
x-Indianapolis Olympians	28	43	.394	20.5	19–14	4–23	5–6	15–26
Milwaukee Hawks	27	44	.380	21.5	14–8	3–24	10–12	15–26

x – clinched playoff spot

=== Game log ===
1952–53 Game log
#	Date	Opponent	Score	High points	Record
1	November 1	Fort Wayne	82–94	Arnie Risen (15)	1–0
2	November 6	@ Fort Wayne	84–64	Bobby Wanzer (17)	2–0
3	November 7	@ Indianapolis	65–63	Bob Davies (14)	3–0
4	November 8	Indianapolis	96–99 (4OT)	Odie Spears (31)	4–0
5	November 9	@ Milwaukee	75–78	Bob Davies (23)	4–1
6	November 11	New York	94–104	Jack Coleman (24)	5–1
7	November 13	N Milwaukee	97–79	Davies, Wanzer (18)	6–1
8	November 15	Minneapolis	89–97	Arnie Risen (24)	7–1
9	November 16	@ Boston	87–96	Bob Davies (20)	7–2
10	November 22	Milwaukee	65–69	Bob Davies (24)	8–2
11	November 23	Boston	102–100	Bob Davies (28)	8–3
12	November 25	Baltimore	89–106	Johnson, Spears (19)	9–3
13	November 27	@ Syracuse	79–86	Bobby Wanzer (16)	9–4
14	November 29	Minneapolis	71–83	Arnie Risen (22)	10–4
15	November 30	@ Milwaukee	91–88	Bob Davies (21)	11–4
16	December 2	@ Indianapolis	76–85	McMahon, Spears (14)	11–5
17	December 6	Indianapolis	79–82	Arnie Risen (29)	12–5
18	December 7	Philadelphia	92–94	Bob Davies (27)	13–5
19	December 9	@ New York	77–75	Bobby Wanzer (17)	14–5
20	December 10	@ Baltimore	99–97 (OT)	Arnie Risen (23)	15–5
21	December 11	@ Philadelphia	86–98	Odie Spears (15)	15–6
22	December 13	New York	99–97 (OT)	Bob Davies (27)	15–7
23	December 14	@ Minneapolis	77–95	Jack Coleman (15)	15–8
24	December 16	@ Indianapolis	84–71	Bobby Wanzer (17)	16–8
25	December 20	Fort Wayne	89–92	Bobby Wanzer (15)	17–8
26	December 21	N Indianapolis	83–65	Odie Spears (21)	18–8
27	December 25	@ Philadelphia	93–78	Coleman, Risen (19)	19–8
28	December 27	Indianapolis	73–94	Bobby Wanzer (27)	20–8
29	December 30	Syracuse	93–106	Bob Davies (22)	21–8
30	December 31	N Milwaukee	82–74	Jack Coleman (22)	22–8
31	January 1	Boston	83–81 (OT)	Bobby Wanzer (15)	22–9
32	January 3	Fort Wayne	101–106	Arnie Risen (30)	23–9
33	January 4	@ Minneapolis	80–83 (OT)	Bobby Wanzer (21)	23–10
34	January 6	N Minneapolis	85–69	Bobby Wanzer (25)	24–10
35	January 8	N Boston	85–88 (OT)	Bobby Wanzer (20)	24–11
36	January 10	Milwaukee	81–89	Odie Spears (21)	25–11
37	January 11	@ Milwaukee	79–83 (2OT)	Bob Davies (16)	25–12
38	January 15	@ Syracuse	85–109	Davies, Johnson (15)	25–13
39	January 17	Minneapolis	101–109	Bob Davies (29)	26–13
40	January 18	@ Fort Wayne	87–90	Bob Davies (26)	26–14
41	January 20	@ Indianapolis	59–70	Odie Spears (10)	26–15
42	January 21	@ Baltimore	89–82	Bob Davies (21)	27–15
43	January 24	Syracuse	107–82	Arnie Risen (23)	27–16
44	January 27	New York	74–72	Bobby Wanzer (21)	27–17
45	January 30	N Fort Wayne	70–68 (OT)	Bobby Wanzer (18)	28–17
46	January 31	Philadelphia	83–103	Jack Coleman (19)	29–17
47	February 1	@ Boston	109–86	Bobby Wanzer (30)	30–17
48	February 2	N Milwaukee	80–78 (OT)	Bob Davies (29)	31–17
49	February 3	Baltimore	82–109	Bob Davies (20)	32–17
50	February 5	@ Syracuse	79–83 (OT)	Bob Davies (27)	32–18
51	February 7	Minneapolis	72–87	Bob Davies (18)	33–18
52	February 8	@ Milwaukee	82–85 (OT)	Bobby Wanzer (17)	33–19
53	February 10	Philadelphia	85–101	Bob Davies (19)	34–19
54	February 14	Milwaukee	72–81	Bob Davies (20)	35–19
55	February 15	@ Fort Wayne	84–72	Bob Davies (27)	36–19
56	February 17	Fort Wayne	88–78	Arnie Johnson (16)	36–20
57	February 19	@ Minneapolis	87–107	Holzman, Johnson, Spears (13)	36–21
58	February 21	Syracuse	73–84	Bob Davies (18)	37–21
59	February 24	Fort Wayne	91–80	Bob Davies (25)	37–22
60	February 25	N New York	79–71 (OT)	Bob Davies (18)	38–22
61	February 28	Boston	85–92	Arnie Johnson (21)	39–22
62	March 3	@ New York	88–109	Bob Davies (22)	39–23
63	March 4	@ Baltimore	81–77	Bob Davies (22)	40–23
64	March 5	N Philadelphia	69–78	Arnie Risen (15)	40–24
65	March 7	Minneapolis	82–84	Arnie Risen (21)	41–24
66	March 8	@ Fort Wayne	71–69	Arnie Risen (22)	42–24
67	March 10	@ Indianapolis	61–59	Arnie Risen (15)	43–24
68	March 12	@ Minneapolis	77–89	Jack McMahon (18)	43–25
69	March 14	Indianapolis	90–82	Bobby Wanzer (17)	43–26
70	March 15	Baltimore	87–105	Arnie Risen (23)	44–26

== Playoffs ==
1953 playoff game log
Division Semi-finals: 1–2 (home: 0–2; road: 1–0)

Game	Date	Team	Score	High points	Location	Series
1	March 20	Fort Wayne	L 77–84	Arnie Risen (17)	Edgerton Park Arena	0–1
2	March 22	@ Fort Wayne	W 83–71	Bobby Wanzer (19)	War Memorial Coliseum	1–1
3	March 24	Fort Wayne	L 65–67	Bobby Wanzer (17)	Edgerton Park Arena	1–2

1953 schedule

== Player statistics ==
Legend
GP	Games played	GS	Games started	MPG	Minutes per game
FG%	Field-goal percentage	3P%	3-point field-goal percentage	FT%	Free-throw percentage
RPG	Rebounds per game	APG	Assists per game	SPG	Steals per game
BPG	Blocks per game	PPG	Points per game

=== Season ===
Player	GP	GS	MPG	FG%	3FG%	FT%	RPG	APG	SPG	BPG	PPG
Cal Christensen											
Jack Coleman											
Bob Davies											
Alex Hannum											
Red Holzman											
Arnie Johnson											
Jack McMahon											
Arnie Risen											
Odie Spears											
Bobby Wanzer											

=== Playoffs ===
Player	GP	GS	MPG	FG%	3FG%	FT%	RPG	APG	SPG	BPG	PPG
Cal Christensen											
Jack Coleman											
Bob Davies											
Alex Hannum											
Red Holzman											
Arnie Johnson											
Jack McMahon											
Arnie Risen											
Odie Spears											
Bobby Wanzer											

== Awards and records ==
- Bob Davies, All-NBA Second Team
- Bobby Wanzer, All-NBA Second Team
