= 1971–72 Pittsburgh Condors season =

Final ABA basketball team season

- Head coach: Jack McMahon (4–6); Mark Binstein (21–53)
- Arena: Pittsburgh Civic Arena

Results
- Record: 25–59 (.298)
- Place: Division: 6th (Eastern)
- Playoff finish: Did not qualify
- Radio: WEEP

The 1971–72 Pittsburgh Condors season was the second and final season of the Pittsburgh Condors along with the fourth and final season of Pittsburgh's own involvement in the American Basketball Association and the fifth and final season of the franchise in general when including their only season of play where they used the Minnesota Pipers name after winning the inaugural ABA Finals Championship. Jack McMahon initially began the season as the team's head coach before general manager Mark Binstein took over as the final head coach the franchise ever had after a 4–6 start into the season. By the time the season was halfway over with, the team was a below-average 17–25. Going from that point onward, the team went into an abysmal 8–34 second half for the season, with a losing streak of 12 games long near the end of the season sealing the deal for them not entering the 1972 ABA Playoffs, as well as removing any hope of getting out of the cellar of the Eastern Division going forward. One factor that went against them was despite them being first in points scored throughout the season at 119.2 per game, they were also dead last in the league at points allowed with an average of 126.4 allowed by their opponents per game.

By this point in time, attendance had simply dried up, with fan interest in Pittsburgh being nearly nonexistent (to the point where key equipment was being ripped out of the Pittsburgh Civic Arena during one of the games played) and games being moved (with one being moved to Uniontown, 46 miles away from Pittsburgh) away from the Civic Arena due to the team having immediate troubles with staying in Pittsburgh after a certain point in the season. Near the end of the season, the team unofficially had the nickname of the "United States Condors" due to them having and considering home arenas being held nearly all over the United States of America during the season, with one late season game notably being played in Birmingham, Alabama as an experimental idea for a potential relocation spot for the franchise. The final game this franchise would play in the Pittsburgh Civic Arena would also be their final win in franchise history, as they'd get a close 131–130 win over the Virginia Squires. Fittingly, their penultimate game was played in Tucson, Arizona versus the Kentucky Colonels. On March 29, they played (and lost) their final game as a franchise in a 113–128 road loss to the Indiana Pacers. In the book Loose Balls, it was revealed that during the team's final season of existence, the Condors weren't paying their rent toward the arena they were playing in and that in order to survive, the Condors wanted radio and TV broadcasters to cash in for the team's expenses with $50 being paid if someone was in radio and $200 being paid for each TV camera brought into the arena. One game involving the Kentucky Colonels was especially notable with Mark Binstein (who was the general manager at the time) arguing all night long with a guy that worked with the arena, with the argument being heard throughout the radio commentary's match in question. Attempts to move the team to a different place in the U.S.A. failed after the season ended for the Condors despite the franchise looking at many different cities for interest, and the league soon cancelled the franchise altogether, thus ending professional basketball in the city of Pittsburgh. Since then, no pro basketball team has ever played in the city of Pittsburgh. The Condors players were later dispersed to other ABA teams for the upcoming season, with George Thompson going to the recently renamed Memphis Tams, Mike Lewis going to the Carolina Cougars, Skeeter Swift going to the Dallas Chaparrals, and Walt Szczerbiak going to the Kentucky Colonels.

== ABA Draft ==
This draft was the first ABA draft to have a properly recorded historical note of every round in their draft available.

Round	Pick	Player	Position(s)	Nationality	College
1	3	Howard Porter	SF/PF	United States	Villanova
2	12	Levi Wyatt	F	United States	Alcorn A&M College
3	27	Jim O'Brien	PG	United States	Boston College
4	35	Bill Smith	C	United States	Syracuse
4	37	Bubba Jones	G	United States	Ashland College
5	48	Mike Jordan	F	United States	Savannah State College
6	59	Barry Nelson	F	United States	Duquesne
7	70	John Sutter	F	United States	Tulane
8	81	Charlie Yelverton	SG/SF	United States	Fordham
9	92	Vincent White	F	United States	Savannah State College
10	103	James Fleming	F	United States	Alcorn A&M College
10	105	Eric Hill	G	United States	Minnesota
11	114	Rayford McCambry	G	United States	Miles College
12	124	isaiah Wilson	SG	United States	University of Baltimore
13	134	Ray Greene	G	United States	California State College
14	143	Gene Mumford	G	United States	University of Scranton
15	152	Lee McCullough	F	United States	Indiana (Pennsylvania)
16	161	Russell Golden	F	United States	Jacksonville
17	169	Harry James	G	United States	Montclair State University
18	176	John Novey	G	United States	Mount St. Mary's College

This draft would inadvertently be the penultimate draft that the Pittsburgh Condors would ever participate in as a franchise. The final draft they'd participate in would be done months before the 1972 ABA Dispersal Draft involving this franchise and "The Floridians" franchise. The Condors would also be the only franchise to have multiple late round draft picks due to them trading with the New York Nets sometime before the draft began.

== Roster ==
1971–72 Pittsburgh Condors roster
Players

Pos.	No.	Player	Height	Weight	DOB	From
C	13	Nate Bowman	6 ft 10 in (2.08 m)	230 lb (104 kg)	March 19, 1943	Wichita State
SF	40	John Brisker	6 ft 5 in (1.96 m)	210 lb (95 kg)	June 15, 1947	Toledo
SF	35	George Carter	6 ft 4 in (1.93 m)	210 lb (95 kg)	January 10, 1944	St. Bonaventure
G	30	Mickey Davis	6 ft 7 in (2.01 m)	195 lb (88 kg)	June 16, 1950	Duquesne
C	10	Mike Grosso	6 ft 9 in (2.06 m)	230 lb (104 kg)	September 7, 1947	Louisville
PF	13	Stew Johnson	6 ft 8 in (2.03 m)	220 lb (100 kg)	August 19, 1944	Murray State
G	14, 22	Arvesta Kelly	6 ft 2 in (1.88 m)	175 lb (79 kg)	November 20, 1945	Lincoln (MO)
PF	33	Dave Lattin	6 ft 6 in (1.98 m)	225 lb (102 kg)	December 23, 1943	UTEP
C	24	Mike Lewis	6 ft 8 in (2.03 m)	225 lb (102 kg)	March 18, 1946	Duke
PF	12	Jim Ligon	6 ft 7 in (2.01 m)	210 lb (95 kg)	February 22, 1944	Kokomo High School
PG	44	Jim O'Brien	6 ft 1 in (1.85 m)	170 lb (77 kg)	April 9, 1950	Boston College
C	15	Paul Ruffner	6 ft 1 in (1.85 m)	225 lb (102 kg)	October 15, 1948	BYU
SG	23	Skeeter Swift	6 ft 3 in (1.91 m)	204 lb (93 kg)	June 19, 1946	East Tennessee State
SF	21	Walt Szczerbiak	6 ft 6 in (1.98 m)	210 lb (95 kg)	August 21, 1949	George Washington
C	22	Tiny Ron Taylor	7 ft 1 in (2.16 m)	265 lb (120 kg)	November 21, 1947	USC
SG	25	George Thompson	6 ft 2 in (1.88 m)	200 lb (91 kg)	November 29, 1947	Marquette
SG	20	Bob Verga	6 ft 1 in (1.85 m)	190 lb (86 kg)	September 7, 1945	Duke

Coaches
Head coach
- Jack McMahon / Mark Binstein

Legend
- (DP) Unsigned draft pick
- (FA) Free agent
- (S) Suspended
- Injured

Roster

== Final standings ==
=== Eastern Division ===
Team	W	L	%	GB
Kentucky Colonels	68	16	.810	-
Virginia Squires	45	39	.536	23
New York Nets	44	40	.524	24
The Floridians	36	48	.429	32
Carolina Cougars	35	49	.417	33
Pittsburgh Condors	25	59	.298	43

== Awards and honors ==
1972 ABA All-Star Game selections (game played on January 29, 1972)

- John Brisker
- George Thompson

== ABA Dispersal Draft ==
On June 13, 1972, months after participating in and completing the 1972 ABA draft, it was announced by ABA commissioner Jack Dolph that both the Pittsburgh Condors and "The Floridians" franchises would go defunct for the 1972–73 ABA season due to neither team finding a viable location to help ensure their survival beyond the season, especially due to rumblings regarding a future NBA-ABA merger looking to not include either team alongside the Memphis Pros (who would soon afterward rebrand themselves into the Memphis Tams in an attempt to regain sustainability in the ABA) due to them all being considered the weakest links of the ABA at the time. For the Condors, the team tried to find a newer, bigger location like Birmingham, Tucson, El Paso, New Haven, Cincinnati, and even San Diego (the last two places also being places "The Floridians" would look into, with San Diego later having its own expansion franchise for the ABA in the San Diego Conquistadors the following season), but no location feigned interest in the team. In the final ABA draft Pittsburgh ever participated in, the Condors selected John Gianelli from the University of the Pacific, Chuck Terry from California's Long Beach State University, Bob Davis from Weber State University, Wil Robinson from West Virginia University, Harold Fox from Jacksonville University, James Silas from Stephen F. Austin State University, Joe Mackey from the University of Southern California, Marshall Wingate from Niagara University, Charles Edge from LeMoyne–Owen College, Brian Adrian from Davidson College, Joe Gaines from Belmont College, Chic Downing from Benedictine College, Billy Pleas from the University of Detroit, David Werthman from West Virginia University, Henry Seawright from Manhattan College, Lee McCollough from Indiana University of Pennsylvania, Harry Anderson from Saint Peter's College, and Mexican-born player Manuel Raga from the Ignis Varese in Italy with their final draft picks. The ABA would host its first ever dispersal draft a month later on July 13 involving former Condors and Floridians players, with every remaining team except for the Denver Rockets taking at least one player that was on the Condors at the time of the draft. This draft in question would be six rounds long, but Condors players would only be taken up until the first five rounds of that specific draft. Still, the following Condors players (including those just drafted by the Condors months prior in the 1972 ABA draft) would be selected in this order by the following surviving ABA teams of the time outside of the Denver Rockets due to them opting to take Floridians players with all of their available choices at hand.

- Round 1, Pick 1: George Thompson (Memphis Tams)
- Round 1, Pick 3: Mike Lewis (Carolina Cougars)
- Round 1, Pick 4: John Brisker (Dallas Chaparrals)
- Round 1, Pick 5: Skeeter Swift (Dallas Chaparrals)
- Round 1, Pick 11: Walt Szczerbiak (Kentucky Colonels)
- Round 1, Pick 12: Chuck Terry (New York Nets)
- Round 2, Pick 1 (#14): Dave Lattin (Memphis Tams)
- Round 2, Pick 4 (#17): John Gianelli (Dallas Chaparrals)
- Round 2, Pick 5 (#18): Joe Mackey (Virginia Squires)
- Round 2, Pick 6 (#19): Chic Downing (Utah Stars)
- Round 3, Pick 3 (#24): Mike Stewart (Carolina Cougars)
- Round 3, Pick 6 (#27): Wil Robinson (Utah Stars)
- Round 4, Pick 4 (#34): Jim Ligon (Virginia Squires)
- Round 4, Pick 5 (#35): Henry Seawright (Utah Stars)
- Round 4, Pick 7 (#37): Brian Adrian (Indiana Pacers)
- Round 5, Pick 1 (#38): Charles Edge (Memphis Tams)
- Round 5, Pick 3 (#40): Billy Pleas (Utah Stars)
