= Jim Brasco =

American basketball player

Personal information
- Born: February 3, 1931 Brooklyn, New York, U.S.
- Died: March 21, 2014 (aged 83) Huntington, New York, U.S.
- Listed height: 6 ft 1 in (1.85 m)
- Listed weight: 170 lb (77 kg)

Career information
- High school: Abraham Lincoln (Brooklyn, New York)
- College: NYU
- NBA draft: 1952: 2nd round, 17th overall pick
- Drafted by: Syracuse Nationals
- Playing career: 1952–1953
- Position: Guard
- Number: 15

Career history
- 1952: Syracuse Nationals
- 1952–1953: Milwaukee Hawks
- 1953: Elmira Colonels
- Stats at NBA.com
- Stats at Basketball Reference

James J. Brasco (February 3, 1931 – March 21, 2014) was an American basketball player. He played collegiately for New York University, before being selected by the Syracuse Nationals in the 1952 NBA draft. During the 1952–53 NBA season, Brasco played for the Nationals for ten games before his player rights were sold to the Milwaukee Hawks, with whom he played for an additional ten games.

== Career statistics ==
Legend
GP	Games played	GS	Games started	MPG	Minutes per game
FG%	Field goal percentage	3P%	3-point field goal percentage	FT%	Free throw percentage
RPG	Rebounds per game	APG	Assists per game	SPG	Steals per game
BPG	Blocks per game	PPG	Points per game	**Bold**	Career high

=== NBA ===
==== Regular season ====
Year	Team	GP	MPG	FG%	FT%	RPG	APG	PPG
1952–53	Syracuse	**10**	11.1	.229	.786	**1.5**	**1.2**	3.3
1952–53	Milwaukee	**10**	**13.7**	**.304**	**.800**	.9	.9	**4.4**
Career		20	12.4	.266	.794	1.2	1.1	3.9
