= 1952 NBA draft =

Basketball player selection

General information
- Sport: Basketball
- Date: April 26, 1952
- Location: Minneapolis, Minnesota

Overview
- 106 total selections in 17 rounds
- League: NBA
- Teams: 10
- First selection: Mark Workman, Milwaukee Hawks
- Hall of Famers: 1: F Clyde Lovellette

The 1952 NBA draft was the sixth annual draft of the National Basketball Association (NBA). The draft was held on April 26, 1952, before the 1952–53 season. In this draft, ten remaining NBA teams took turns selecting amateur U.S. college basketball players. In each round, the teams selected in reverse order of their win–loss record in the previous season, except for the defending champion, the Minneapolis Lakers, who was assigned the last pick of each round. The draft consisted of 17 rounds comprising 106 players selected. However, this draft was notable for this being the first time the NBA would not immediately announce the ordering of their draft choices to the public due to worries by the young league that they would give an upcoming rivaling amateur league, the National Industrial Basketball League, an idea of who the best college players were at the time, especially for their two top teams there in the Bartlesville Phillips 66ers and Peoria Caterpillar Tractors; notably, the NBA would also give the 66ers and Peoria invites to the NBA, though they both denied the opportunity to join the league as professional teams.

== Draft selections and draftee career notes ==
Mark Workman from West Virginia University was selected first overall by the Milwaukee Hawks. Bill Mlkvy from Temple University was selected before the draft as Philadelphia Warriors' territorial pick. Don Meineke from the University of Dayton was selected by the Fort Wayne Pistons in the second round and went on to win the inaugural Rookie of the Year Award. The ninth pick of the draft, Clyde Lovellette from University of Kansas, was the only player from that draft to make it to an NBA All-Star Game at least once and to have been inducted to the Basketball Hall of Fame. As such, it would be seen as one of the least successful and less talked about drafts in NBA history, though at least one media outlet would mention the 1952 NBA draft as the worst NBA draft ever held, while also noting that this draft would have been an even bigger disaster without Clyde Lovellette's selection in mind and that its long-term efforts for the four teams with the worst records that season led to them either folding operations or moving elsewhere years after this draft concluded.

Tenth-round pick Gene Conley played both professional basketball and baseball. He played six seasons in the NBA for the Boston Celtics and the New York Knicks as well as 11 seasons in the Major League Baseball (MLB). He won three NBA championships with the Celtics as well as the 1957 World Series with the Milwaukee Braves, becoming the only athlete to win world championships in both basketball and baseball.

Dick Groat from Duke was picked 3rd overall by the Fort Wayne Pistons and went on to win the National League 1960 MVP, and two World Series championships while playing shortstop for the Pittsburgh Pirates and then the St. Louis Cardinals.

== Key ==
Pos.	G	F	C
Position	Guard	Forward	Center

^	Denotes player who has been inducted to the Naismith Memorial Basketball Hall of Fame
^{#}	Denotes player who has never appeared in an NBA regular-season or playoff game
^{~}	Denotes player who has been selected as Rookie of the Year

== Draft ==
Round	Pick	Player	Position	Nationality	Team	College
T	–	Bill Mlkvy	F	United States	Philadelphia Warriors	Temple
1	1	Mark Workman	F/C	United States	Milwaukee Hawks	West Virginia
1	2	Jim Baechtold	G/F	United States	Baltimore Bullets	Eastern Kentucky
1	3	Dick Groat	G	United States	Fort Wayne Pistons	Duke
1	4	Joe Dean^{#}	G	United States	Indianapolis Olympians	LSU
1	5	Ralph Polson	F/C	United States	New York Knicks	Whitworth
1	6	Bill Stauffer^{#}	F	United States	Boston Celtics	Missouri
1	7	Bob Lochmueller	F	United States	Syracuse Nationals	Louisville
1	8	Chuck Darling^{#}	F/C	United States	Rochester Royals	Iowa
1	9	Clyde Lovellette^	F/C	United States	Minneapolis Lakers	Kansas
2	10	Eddie Miller	F/C	United States	Milwaukee Hawks	Syracuse
2	11	Chuck Grigsby	G	United States	Baltimore Bullets	Dayton
2	12	Don Meineke^{~}	F/C	United States	Fort Wayne Pistons	Dayton
2	13	Walt Davis	F/C	United States	Philadelphia Warriors	Texas A&M
2	14	Bob Zawoluk	F/C	United States	Indianapolis Olympians	St. John's
2	15	Bert Cook	G	United States	New York Knicks	Utah State
2	16	Jim Iverson^{#}	G	United States	Boston Celtics	Kansas State
2	17	Jim Brasco	G	United States	Syracuse Nationals	NYU
2	18	Jack McMahon	G	United States	Rochester Royals	St. John's
2	19	Jim Holstein	F	United States	Minneapolis Lakers	Cincinnati

== Other picks ==
The following list includes other draft picks who have appeared in at least one NBA game.

Round	Pick	Player	Position	Nationality	Team	College
3	25	Dick Bunt	G	United States	New York Knicks	NYU
4	37	Herm Hedderick	G	United States	Boston Celtics	Canisius
4	38	Ronnie MacGilvray	G	United States	Rochester Royals	St. John's
4		Blaine Denning	G	United States	Baltimore Bullets	Lawrence Tech
5	40	George McLeod	F	United States	Milwaukee Hawks	TCU
5	43	Tom Brennan	F	United States	Philadelphia Warriors	Villanova
5	44	Gene Rhodes	G	United States	Indianapolis Olympians	Western Kentucky
5	47	Ken McBride	G/F	United States	Syracuse Nationals	Maryland State
6	59	Jim Holstein	G/F	United States	Minneapolis Lakers	Cincinnati
7	61	Bob Priddy	F	United States	Baltimore Bullets	New Mexico A&M
7	64	Skippy Whitaker	G	United States	Indianapolis Olympians	Kentucky
8	73	Moe Radovich	G	United States	Philadelphia Warriors	Wyoming
8	75	Dick Surhoff	F	United States	New York Knicks	Long Island
10	90	Gene Conley	F/C	United States	Boston Celtics	Washington State
11	93	Bob Peterson	F	United States	Baltimore Bullets	Oregon
11	96	Carl McNulty	G	United States	Minneapolis Lakers	Purdue
12	97	Jim Walsh	F	United States	Baltimore Bullets	Stanford

== Notable undrafted players ==
These players were not selected in the 1952 draft but played at least one game in the NBA.

Player	Pos.	Nationality	School/club team
Fred Christ	G	United States	Fordham
Pete Darcey	C	United States	Oklahoma State
Don Hanrahan	F	United States	Loyola Chicago
Bob Naber	F	United States	Louisville

== See also ==
- List of first overall NBA draft picks
