= Cal Christensen =

American basketball player

Personal information
- Born: June 6, 1927 Toledo, Ohio, U.S.
- Died: August 31, 2011 (aged 84) Waterville, Ohio, U.S.
- Listed height: 6 ft 5 in (1.96 m)
- Listed weight: 210 lb (95 kg)

Career information
- High school: Macomber (Toledo, Ohio)
- College: Toledo (1947–1950)
- NBA draft: 1950: 5th round, 52nd overall pick
- Drafted by: Tri-Cities Blackhawks
- Playing career: 1950–1955
- Position: Power forward / center
- Number: 14, 20, 18

Career history
- 1950–1952: Tri-Cities Blackhawks / Milwaukee Hawks
- 1952–1955: Rochester Royals

Career NBA statistics
- Points: 1,507 (5.2 ppg)
- Rebounds: 1,587 (5.5 rpg)
- Assists: 460 (1.6 apg)
- Stats at NBA.com
- Stats at Basketball Reference

Calvin Lawrence Christensen (July 8, 1927 – August 31, 2011) was an American basketball player.

He played collegiately for the Toledo Rockets.

He was selected by the Tri-Cities Blackhawks in the 5th round of the 1950 NBA draft.

He played for the Blackhawks (1950–51), Milwaukee Hawks (1951–52) and Rochester Royals (1952–55) in the NBA for 291 games. He died in 2011 in Waterville, Ohio where he lived with his wife of 51 years, Sharon.

== Career statistics ==
Legend
| GP | Games played | GS | Games started | MPG | Minutes per game |
| FG% | Field goal percentage | 3P% | 3-point field goal percentage | FT% | Free throw percentage |
| RPG | Rebounds per game | APG | Assists per game | SPG | Steals per game |
| BPG | Blocks per game | PPG | Points per game | **Bold** | Career high |

=== NBA ===
==== Regular season ====
| Year | Team | GP | MPG | FG% | FT% | RPG | APG | PPG |
|---|---|---|---|---|---|---|---|---|
| 1950–51 | Tri-Cities | 67 | | .301 | **.714** | **7.8** | **2.4** | **6.6** |
| 1951–52 | Milwaukee | 24 | 15.6 | .302 | .526 | 3.4 | 1.4 | 3.7 |
| 1952–53 | Rochester | 59 | 13.2 | .313 | .596 | 3.4 | .9 | 3.6 |
| 1953–54 | Rochester | 70 | **23.6** | .347 | .529 | 5.6 | 1.5 | 5.9 |
| 1954–55 | Rochester | **71** | 17.0 | **.374** | .602 | 5.5 | 1.5 | 5.0 |
| Career | | 291 | 17.9 | .330 | .606 | 5.5 | 1.6 | 5.2 |

==== Playoffs ====
| Year | Team | GP | MPG | FG% | FT% | RPG | APG | PPG |
|---|---|---|---|---|---|---|---|---|
| 1953 | Rochester | 2 | 6.5 | .000 | **.750** | 2.0 | .5 | 1.5 |
| 1954 | Rochester | **6** | **22.8** | **.357** | .545 | **5.8** | **2.5** | **5.3** |
| 1955 | Rochester | 3 | 10.0 | .250 | .500 | 2.0 | .0 | 2.3 |
| Career | | 11 | 16.4 | .308 | .563 | 4.1 | 1.5 | 3.8 |
