= 1953–54 Rochester Royals season =

NBA professional basketball team season

- Head coach: Les Harrison
- Owners: Jack Harrison; Les Harrison
- Arena: Edgerton Park Arena

Results
- Record: 44–28 (.611)
- Place: Division: 2nd (Western)
- Playoff finish: West Division Finals (eliminated 1–2)
- Stats at Basketball Reference
- Radio: WHAM

The 1953–54 Rochester Royals season was the Royals' sixth season in the NBA.

== Regular season ==
=== Season standings ===
Western Division	W	L	PCT	GB	Home	Road	Neutral	Div
x-Minneapolis Lakers	46	26	.639	–	20–4	13–15	13–7	19–13
x-Rochester Royals	44	28	.611	2	18–10	12–15	14–3	22–10
x-Fort Wayne Pistons	40	32	.556	6	19–8	11–17	10–7	17–15
Milwaukee Hawks	21	51	.292	25	11–14	5–17	6–20	6–26

x – clinched playoff spot

=== Game log ===
1953–54 Game log
#	Date	Opponent	Score	High points	Record
1	October 31	N Baltimore	72–68	Bob Davies (20)	1–0
2	November 1	@ Baltimore	80–72	Bobby Wanzer (25)	2–0
3	November 7	Fort Wayne	76–91	Bobby Wanzer (18)	3–0
4	November 8	@ Syracuse	66–85	Arnie Risen (16)	3–1
5	November 10	Philadelphia	66–64	Jack Coleman (13)	3–2
6	November 14	Minneapolis	91–98 (3OT)	Odie Spears (22)	4–2
7	November 15	@ Fort Wayne	65–68	Arnie Risen (19)	4–3
8	November 17	N Boston	92–73	Bobby Wanzer (16)	5–3
9	November 19	N Milwaukee	79–69	Bobby Wanzer (21)	6–3
10	November 20	@ Milwaukee	81–63	Bob Davies (17)	7–3
11	November 21	@ Minneapolis	70–76	Hannum, Risen (15)	7–4
12	November 22	@ Fort Wayne	82–83	Bobby Wanzer (15)	7–5
13	November 24	Syracuse	89–80	Bobby Wanzer (14)	7–6
14	November 26	@ Baltimore	80–75 (OT)	Bobby Wanzer (14)	8–6
15	November 28	@ New York	90–95 (OT)	Jack McMahon (20)	8–7
16	November 29	New York	69–64	Arnie Risen (18)	8–8
17	December 1	Fort Wayne	69–92	Bobby Wanzer (24)	9–8
18	December 5	Baltimore	65–72	Jack McMahon (19)	10–8
19	December 8	Boston	79–97	Bob Davies (21)	11–8
20	December 12	Syracuse	85–90	Bob Davies (23)	12–8
21	December 13	N Minneapolis	87–70	Arnie Risen (19)	13–8
22	December 15	Milwaukee	64–76	Arnie Risen (18)	14–8
23	December 17	N Philadelphia	91–79	Arnie Risen (23)	15–8
24	December 19	Minneapolis	91–78	Arnie Risen (16)	15–9
25	December 25	@ Philadelphia	73–65	Bob Davies (19)	16–9
26	December 26	New York	78–77	Arnie Risen (24)	16–10
27	December 27	@ Boston	72–98	Bob Davies (16)	16–11
28	December 29	Baltimore	77–96	Jack Coleman (23)	17–11
29	December 31	@ Syracuse	81–86	Bobby Wanzer (25)	17–12
30	January 1	Philadelphia	76–79	Bobby Wanzer (20)	18–12
31	January 2	Fort Wayne	76–77 (OT)	Arnie Risen (19)	19–12
32	January 4	N Minneapolis	85–84	Bob Davies (16)	20–12
33	January 7	@ Minneapolis	71–89	Bob Davies (15)	20–13
34	January 9	New York	88–87	Bobby Wanzer (22)	20–14
35	January 10	@ New York	69–81	Jack McMahon (17)	20–15
36	January 12	Milwaukee	73–78	Bobby Wanzer (16)	21–15
37	January 16	Syracuse	95–93 (3OT)	Alex Hannum (18)	21–16
38	January 17	@ Syracuse	81–84	Arnie Risen (24)	21–17
39	January 19	N Fort Wayne	73–67	Bobby Wanzer (18)	22–17
40	January 23	Philadelphia	61–71	Arnie Risen (15)	23–17
41	January 24	@ Boston	93–85	Bobby Wanzer (25)	24–17
42	January 26	N New York	71–74	Bobby Wanzer (17)	24–18
43	January 28	@ Philadelphia	82–79 (OT)	Jack Coleman (15)	25–18
44	January 30	Fort Wayne	70–95	Jack McMahon (16)	26–18
45	January 31	@ Fort Wayne	69–83	Jack McMahon (14)	26–19
46	February 2	Minneapolis	87–78	Bobby Wanzer (16)	26–20
47	February 3	@ Boston	81–88	Arnie Risen (16)	26–21
48	February 5	N Fort Wayne	89–70	Bobby Wanzer (22)	27–21
49	February 6	Boston	104–81	Bob Davies (22)	27–22
50	February 7	@ Baltimore	73–75	Davies, Wanzer (18)	27–23
51	February 9	Milwaukee	70–81	Bob Davies (20)	28–23
52	February 10	@ Milwaukee	62–61	Arnie Risen (19)	29–23
53	February 11	N Milwaukee	79–68	Coleman, Davies (16)	30–23
54	February 13	Syracuse	78–81	Arnie Risen (15)	31–23
55	February 14	@ Minneapolis	77–105	Bobby Wanzer (18)	31–24
56	February 16	N Minneapolis	79–85	Jack Coleman (23)	31–25
57	February 20	Milwaukee	64–66	Bob Davies (17)	32–25
58	February 23	N Boston	93–77	Bobby Wanzer (18)	33–25
59	February 24	@ Baltimore	79–64	Bob Davies (20)	34–25
60	February 25	N Baltimore	102–86	Jack Coleman (21)	35–25
61	February 27	Boston	75–74	Jack McMahon (20)	35–26
62	February 28	@ Syracuse	91–85	Arnie Risen (35)	36–26
63	March 2	N Fort Wayne	71–64	Arnie Risen (15)	37–26
64	March 4	@ Philadelphia	85–78	Jack Coleman (19)	38–26
65	March 5	N New York	66–70	Arnie Risen (19)	38–27
66	March 6	Minneapolis	59–74	Jack McMahon (14)	39–27
67	March 7	@ New York	91–88	Arnie Risen (22)	40–27
68	March 9	N Minneapolis	70–61	Arnie Risen (18)	41–27
69	March 10	N Milwaukee	84–69	Bobby Wanzer (21)	42–27
70	March 11	@ Fort Wayne	95–80	Bob Davies (17)	43–27
71	March 13	Philadelphia	76–77	Bob Davies (21)	44–27
72	March 14	@ Milwaukee	53–91	Cal Christensen (12)	44–28

== Playoffs ==
1954 playoff game log
Division Round Robin Semifinals: 2–1 (home: 1–0; road: 1–1)

Game	Date	Team	Score	High points	Location	Record
1	March 16	Fort Wayne	W 82–75	Bobby Wanzer (18)	Edgerton Park Arena	1–0
2	March 17	@ Minneapolis	L 88–109	Arnie Risen (21)	Minneapolis Auditorium	1–1
3	March 21	@ Fort Wayne	W 89–71	Bobby Wanzer (14)	War Memorial Coliseum	2–1

Division Finals: 1–2 (home: 1–0; road: 0–2)

Game	Date	Team	Score	High points	Location	Series
1	March 24	@ Minneapolis	L 76–89	Wanzer, Coleman (17)	Minneapolis Auditorium	0–1
2	March 27	Minneapolis	W 74–73	Bobby Wanzer (16)	Edgerton Park Arena	1–1
3	March 28	@ Minneapolis	L 72–82	Arnie Risen (24)	Minneapolis Auditorium	1–2

1954 schedule

== Player statistics ==
Legend
GP	Games played	GS	Games started	MPG	Minutes per game
FG%	Field-goal percentage	3P%	3-point field-goal percentage	FT%	Free-throw percentage
RPG	Rebounds per game	APG	Assists per game	SPG	Steals per game
BPG	Blocks per game	PPG	Points per game

=== Season ===
Player	GP	GS	MPG	FG%	3FG%	FT%	RPG	APG	SPG	BPG	PPG
Cal Christensen											
Jack Coleman											
Bob Davies											
Alex Hannum											
Al Masino											
Jack McMahon											
Frank Reddout											
Arnie Risen											
Odie Spears											
Norm Swanson											
Bobby Wanzer											

=== Playoffs ===
Player	GP	GS	MPG	FG%	3FG%	FT%	RPG	APG	SPG	BPG	PPG
Cal Christensen											
Jack Coleman											
Bob Davies											
Alex Hannum											
Jack McMahon											
Arnie Risen											
Odie Spears											
Norm Swanson											
Bobby Wanzer											

== Awards and records ==
- Bobby Wanzer, All-NBA Second Team
