= Zeke Zawoluk =

American basketball player

Personal information
- Born: October 13, 1930 Brooklyn, New York, U.S.
- Died: January 9, 2007 (aged 76) Spring Valley, New York, U.S.
- Listed height: 6 ft 7 in (2.01 m)
- Listed weight: 215 lb (98 kg)

Career information
- High school: St. Francis Preparatory School (Queens, New York)
- College: St. John's (1949–1952)
- NBA draft: 1952: 2nd round, 14th overall pick
- Drafted by: Indianapolis Olympians
- Playing career: 1952–1959
- Position: Power forward / center
- Number: 17, 15

Career history
- 1952–1953: Indianapolis Olympians
- 1953–1955: Philadelphia Warriors
- 1955–1956: Scranton Miners
- 1955–1956: Trenton Capitols / New York-Harlem Yankees
- 1956–1957: Wilkes-Barre Barons
- 1956–1958: Easton Madisons
- 1957–1958: Williamsport Billies
- 1957–1959: Hazleton Hawks

Career highlights
- All-EPBL Second Team (1956); Consensus second-team All-American (1952); Second-team All-American – AP, UPI (1951); Third-team All-American – Look (1951)

Career NBA statistics
- Points: 1,210 (6.8 ppg)
- Rebounds: 732 (4.1 rpg)
- Assists: 217 (1.2 apg)
- Stats at NBA.com
- Stats at Basketball Reference

Robert Michael "Zeke" Zawoluk (October 13, 1930 – January 9, 2007) was an American professional basketball player.

A 6'7" forward/center from Saint Francis Prep and St. John's University, Zawoluk played three seasons (1952–1955) in the NBA as a member of the Indianapolis Olympians and Philadelphia Warriors.

Zawoluk played in the Eastern Professional Basketball League (EPBL) for the Scranton Miners, Trenton Capitols / New York-Harlem Yankees, Wilkes-Barre Barons, Easton Madisons, Williamsport Billies and Hazleton Hawks from 1955 to 1959. He was selected to the All-EPBL Second Team in 1956.

== Career statistics ==
Legend
GP	Games played	GS	Games started	MPG	Minutes per game
FG%	Field goal percentage	3P%	3-point field goal percentage	FT%	Free throw percentage
RPG	Rebounds per game	APG	Assists per game	SPG	Steals per game
BPG	Blocks per game	PPG	Points per game	**Bold**	Career high

=== NBA ===
==== Regular season ====
Year	Team	GP	MPG	FG%	FT%	RPG	APG	PPG
1952–53	Indianapolis	41	15.2	.367	.664	3.6	.8	4.6
1953–54	Philadelphia	**71**	**25.3**	**.376**	**.809**	**4.6**	**1.4**	**8.3**
1954–55	Philadelphia	67	16.7	.368	.779	3.8	1.3	6.4
Career		179	19.7	.372	.767	4.1	1.2	6.8

=== Playoffs ===
Year	Team	GP	MPG	FG%	FT%	RPG	APG	PPG
1953	Indianapolis	2	9.0	.167	.000	1.0	.0	1.0

== See also ==
- List of NCAA Division I men's basketball players with 60 or more points in a game
