= 1952–53 Milwaukee Hawks season =

NBA professional basketball team season

- Head coach: Andrew Levane
- Arena: Milwaukee Arena

Results
- Record: 27–44 (.380)
- Place: Division: 5th (Western)
- Playoff finish: Did not qualify
- Stats at Basketball Reference
- Radio: WTMJ

The 1952–53 Milwaukee Hawks season was the Hawks' seventh season of existence, their fourth season in the NBA, and their second season in Milwaukee.

== Regular season ==
=== Season standings ===
| Western Division | W | L | PCT | GB | Home | Road | Neutral | Div |
|---|---|---|---|---|---|---|---|---|
| x-Minneapolis Lakers | 48 | 22 | .686 | - | 24–2 | 16–15 | 8–5 | 17–13 |
| x-Rochester Royals | 44 | 26 | .629 | 4 | 24–8 | 13–17 | 7–1 | 27–13 |
| x-Fort Wayne Pistons | 36 | 33 | .522 | 11.5 | 25–9 | 8–19 | 3–5 | 18–22 |
| x-Indianapolis Olympians | 28 | 43 | .394 | 20.5 | 19–14 | 4–23 | 5–6 | 15–26 |
| Milwaukee Hawks | 27 | 44 | .380 | 21.5 | 14–8 | 3–24 | 10–12 | 15–26 |

x – clinched playoff spot

=== Game log ===
1952–53 Game log
| # | Date | Opponent | Score | High points | Record |
| 1 | November 1 | Indianapolis | 71–73 | Hutchins, Nichols (17) | 1–0 |
| 2 | November 9 | Rochester | 75–78 | John Payak (14) | 2–0 |
| 3 | November 12 | @ Baltimore | 90–107 | Jack Nichols (24) | 2–1 |
| 4 | November 13 | N Rochester | 97–79 | John Payak (19) | 2–2 |
| 5 | November 15 | Fort Wayne | 68–71 | John Payak (16) | 3–2 |
| 6 | November 16 | @ Minneapolis | 51–87 | Jack Nichols (17) | 3–3 |
| 7 | November 18 | N Philadelphia | 83–82 | Mel Hutchins (23) | 3–4 |
| 8 | November 19 | N Boston | 77–91 | Don Boven (19) | 3–5 |
| 9 | November 20 | @ Syracuse | 73–92 | Jack Nichols (18) | 3–6 |
| 10 | November 22 | @ Rochester | 65–69 | Don Otten (15) | 3–7 |
| 11 | November 23 | Minneapolis | 62–46 | Don Boven (10) | 3–8 |
| 12 | November 25 | @ Indianapolis | 78–66 | George Ratkovicz (15) | 4–8 |
| 13 | November 26 | Fort Wayne | 80–72 | John Payak (16) | 4–9 |
| 14 | November 27 | @ Fort Wayne | 87–95 (OT) | Mel Hutchins (19) | 4–10 |
| 15 | November 28 | N Philadelphia | 77–78 (2OT) | Don Boven (20) | 5–10 |
| 16 | November 30 | Rochester | 91–88 | Hutchins, Masino, Nichols (15) | 5–11 |
| 17 | December 3 | @ Baltimore | 87–98 | Bill Calhoun (18) | 5–12 |
| 18 | December 4 | N Boston | 90–73 | Bill Calhoun (26) | 6–12 |
| 19 | December 6 | @ Boston | 83–88 | Jim Brasco (11) | 6–13 |
| 20 | December 7 | @ Syracuse | 67–71 | Bill Calhoun (21) | 6–14 |
| 21 | December 8 | Syracuse | 89–101 | Bill Calhoun (26) | 7–14 |
| 22 | December 11 | @ Fort Wayne | 70–71 (OT) | Jack Nichols (23) | 7–15 |
| 23 | December 12 | @ Indianapolis | 49–63 | Calhoun, Nichols (10) | 7–16 |
| 24 | December 14 | New York | 74–69 | Mel Hutchins (18) | 7–17 |
| 25 | December 20 | Minneapolis | 75–86 | John Payak (21) | 8–17 |
| 26 | December 22 | N New York | 80–75 | George Ratkovicz (14) | 8–18 |
| 27 | December 25 | @ Fort Wayne | 69–71 (2OT) | Don Boven (14) | 8–19 |
| 28 | December 28 | @ Minneapolis | 77–86 | George Ratkovicz (24) | 8–20 |
| 29 | December 31 | N Rochester | 82–74 | Mel Hutchins (20) | 8–21 |
| 30 | January 1 | Baltimore | 83–81 (OT) | Al Masino (19) | 8–22 |
| 31 | January 2 | N Minneapolis | 74–66 | Mel Hutchins (20) | 8–23 |
| 32 | January 3 | N Minneapolis | 79–75 | Jack Nichols (18) | 8–24 |
| 33 | January 6 | Fort Wayne | 71–73 | Stan Miasek (14) | 9–24 |
| 34 | January 8 | @ New York | 68–81 | Stan Miasek (14) | 9–25 |
| 35 | January 10 | @ Rochester | 81–89 | Mel Hutchins (22) | 9–26 |
| 36 | January 11 | Rochester | 79–83 (2OT) | George Ratkovicz (16) | 10–26 |
| 37 | January 15 | N Indianapolis | 68–75 | Jack Nichols (22) | 10–27 |
| 38 | January 16 | Boston | 100–90 | Jack Nichols (23) | 10–28 |
| 39 | January 18 | @ Minneapolis | 83–70 | Jack Nichols (34) | 11–28 |
| 40 | January 21 | N New York | 70–72 | John Payak (17) | 12–28 |
| 41 | January 23 | N Minneapolis | 65–67 | Mel Hutchins (17) | 13–28 |
| 42 | January 24 | Indianapolis | 64–72 | Jack Nichols (27) | 14–28 |
| 43 | January 25 | @ Fort Wayne | 62–65 | John Payak (21) | 14–29 |
| 44 | January 27 | N Boston | 58–80 | Jack Nichols (15) | 14–30 |
| 45 | January 28 | @ Baltimore | 84–83 | Jack Nichols (27) | 15–30 |
| 46 | January 29 | N Baltimore | 70–67 | Jack Nichols (24) | 16–30 |
| 47 | January 30 | Syracuse | 68–84 | Mel Hutchins (23) | 17–30 |
| 48 | February 2 | N Rochester | 80–78 (OT) | Bill Calhoun (23) | 17–31 |
| 49 | February 3 | N New York | 76–69 | Jack Nichols (23) | 17–32 |
| 50 | February 8 | Rochester | 82–85 (OT) | Mel Hutchins (18) | 18–32 |
| 51 | February 11 | N Indianapolis | 67–65 (OT) | Dave Minor (17) | 19–32 |
| 52 | February 12 | N Baltimore | 92–85 | Jack Nichols (21) | 20–32 |
| 53 | February 13 | @ Boston | 74–77 | Jack Nichols (23) | 20–33 |
| 54 | February 14 | @ Rochester | 72–81 | Jack Nichols (26) | 20–34 |
| 55 | February 15 | Minneapolis | 80–71 | Jack Nichols (21) | 20–35 |
| 56 | February 17 | @ New York | 67–86 | George Ratkovicz (12) | 20–36 |
| 57 | February 19 | @ Syracuse | 72–82 | Jack Nichols (22) | 20–37 |
| 58 | February 21 | N Indianapolis | 61–60 | Mel Hutchins (26) | 21–37 |
| 59 | February 22 | Indianapolis | 64–71 | Jack Nichols (15) | 22–37 |
| 60 | February 23 | N Philadelphia | 64–78 | Jack Nichols (15) | 23–37 |
| 61 | February 24 | @ Indianapolis | 69–71 (OT) | Jack Nichols (19) | 23–38 |
| 62 | February 28 | Philadelphia | 73–87 | George Ratkovicz (19) | 24–38 |
| 63 | March 1 | @ Fort Wayne | 74–76 | Jack Nichols (16) | 24–39 |
| 64 | March 3 | Syracuse | 70–75 | Dave Minor (21) | 25–39 |
| 65 | March 8 | @ Minneapolis | 73–100 | Jack Nichols (19) | 25–40 |
| 66 | March 9 | @ Fort Wayne | 74–94 | George Ratkovicz (19) | 25–41 |
| 67 | March 10 | N Philadelphia | 76–77 | Bill Calhoun (17) | 26–41 |
| 68 | March 11 | N Philadelphia | 72–69 (OT) | Mel Hutchins (20) | 26–42 |
| 69 | March 13 | @ Indianapolis | 50–52 | Bill Calhoun (14) | 26–43 |
| 70 | March 17 | Fort Wayne | 61–87 | Jack Nichols (17) | 27–43 |
| 71 | March 18 | Indianapolis | 74–69 | George Ratkovicz (14) | 27–44 |

== See also ==
- 1952-53 NBA season
