= Bob Priddy (basketball) =

American basketball player (1930–2021)

Personal information
- Born: March 24, 1930 Altus, Oklahoma, U.S.
- Died: October 8, 2021 (aged 91)
- Listed height: 6 ft 3 in (1.91 m)
- Listed weight: 190 lb (86 kg)

Career information
- High school: Headrick (Headrick, Oklahoma)
- College: New Mexico State (1948–1952)
- NBA draft: 1952: 7th round, 61st overall pick
- Drafted by: Baltimore Bullets
- Playing career: 1952–1953
- Position: Small forward
- Number: 10, 9

Career history
- 1952–1953: Baltimore Bullets
- 1953: Wilkes-Barre Barons

Career highlights
- First-team All-Border (1952)

Career NBA statistics
- Points: 36 (2.3 ppg)
- Rebounds: 36 (2.3 rpg)
- Assists: 7 (0.4 apg)
- Stats at NBA.com
- Stats at Basketball Reference

Robert Benjamin Priddy (March 24, 1930 – October 8, 2021) was an American professional basketball player. Priddy was selected in the 1952 NBA draft by the Baltimore Bullets after a collegiate career at New Mexico A&M. He played for the Bullets in just 16 games during the 1952–53 season.

== Career statistics ==
Legend
GP	Games played	GS	Games started	MPG	Minutes per game
FG%	Field goal percentage	3P%	3-point field goal percentage	FT%	Free throw percentage
RPG	Rebounds per game	APG	Assists per game	SPG	Steals per game
BPG	Blocks per game	PPG	Points per game	**Bold**	Career high

=== NBA ===
==== Regular season ====
Year	Team	GP	MPG	FG%	FT%	RPG	APG	PPG
1952–53	Baltimore	16	9.3	.368	.571	2.3	.4	2.3

==== Playoffs ====
Year	Team	GP	MPG	FG%	FT%	RPG	APG	PPG
1953	Baltimore	1	1.0	–	–	.0	.0	.0
