= Al Masino =

American basketball player

Personal information
- Born: February 5, 1928 Richmond, New York, U.S.
- Died: August 16, 2006 (aged 78)
- Listed height: 5 ft 10 in (1.78 m)
- Listed weight: 174 lb (79 kg)

Career information
- College: Canisius (1946–1950)
- NBA draft: 1950: undrafted
- Playing career: 1950–1954
- Position: Point guard
- Number: 4, 12, 16, 12

Career history
- 1950–1951: Utica Pros
- 1951–1952: Elmira Colonels
- 1952–1953: Milwaukee Hawks
- 1953: Rochester Royals
- 1953–1954: Syracuse Nationals
- Stats at NBA.com
- Stats at Basketball Reference

Alfred Albert Masino (February 5, 1928 – August 16, 2006) was an American professional basketball player. He played in the National Basketball Association for the Milwaukee Hawks, Rochester Royals, and Syracuse Nationals.

== Career statistics ==
Legend
GP	Games played	GS	Games started	MPG	Minutes per game
FG%	Field goal percentage	3P%	3-point field goal percentage	FT%	Free throw percentage
RPG	Rebounds per game	APG	Assists per game	SPG	Steals per game
BPG	Blocks per game	PPG	Points per game	**Bold**	Career high

=== NBA ===
==== Regular season ====
Year	Team	GP	MPG	FG%	FT%	RPG	APG	PPG
1952–53	Milwaukee	**72***	**24.6**	.335	**.627**	**2.5**	**2.2**	**5.5**
1953–54	Rochester	11	4.5	**.500**	.583	.6	.6	2.1
1953–54	Syracuse	16	8.2	.391	.622	1.3	.9	3.7
Career		99	19.7	.346	.625	2.1	1.8	4.8

=== Playoffs ===
Year	Team	GP	MPG	FG%	FT%	RPG	APG	PPG
1954	Syracuse	13*	7.4	.350	.467	.5	.5	1.6
