= 1963 NCAA College Division basketball tournament =

Edition of USA college basketball tournament

- Teams: 32
- Finals site: Roberts Municipal Stadium, Evansville, Indiana
- Champions: South Dakota State Jackrabbits (1st title)
- Runner-up: Wittenberg Tigers (2nd title game)
- Semifinalists: Oglethorpe Stormy Petrels (1st Final Four); Southern Illinois Salukis (2nd Final Four)
- Winning coach: Jim Iverson (1st title)
- MOP: Wayne Rasmussen (South Dakota State)
- Attendance: 18,526

The 1963 NCAA College Division basketball tournament involved 32 schools playing in a single-elimination tournament to determine the national champion of men's NCAA College Division college basketball as a culmination of the 1962–63 NCAA College Division men's basketball season. It was won by South Dakota State University, with South Dakota State's Wayne Rasmussen named Most Outstanding Player.

1963 NCAA Division II Men's sites - regionals (cyan) Elite Eight (red)

== Regional participants ==
School	Outcome
Austin Peay	Fourth Place
Bellarmine	Third Place
Oglethorpe	Regional Champion
Tennessee State	Runner-up

School	Outcome
Bloomsburg	Runner-up
Hofstra	Third Place
Mount St. Mary's	Fourth Place
Philadelphia Textile	Regional Champion

School	Outcome
Buffalo	Fourth Place
South Carolina State	Runner-up
Wittenberg	Regional Champion
Youngstown State	Third Place

School	Outcome
Assumption	Third Place
Fairleigh Dickinson	Fourth Place
Northeastern	Regional Champion
Springfield	Runner-up

School	Outcome
Augustana (IL)	Fourth Place
Concordia (IL)	Third Place
Evansville	Regional Champion
Washington (MO)	Runner-up

School	Outcome
Arkansas State	Third Place
Lamar	Runner-up
SE Missouri State	Fourth Place
Southern Illinois	Regional Champion

School	Outcome
Cornell (IA)	Fourth Place
Michigan Tech	Third Place
Nebraska Wesleyan	Runner-up
South Dakota State	Regional Champion

School	Outcome
Chapman	Runner-up
Fresno State	Regional Champion
San Francisco State	Fourth Place
UC Santa Barbara	Third Place

== Regionals ==
=== South Central - Louisville, Kentucky ===
Location: Knights Hall Host: Bellarmine College

Regional semifinals Round of 32; March 8
Tennessee State	119
Austin Peay	94
Oglethorpe	57
Bellarmine	49

Regional Final; Sweet 16; March 9
Tennessee State	51
Oglethorpe	55

- Third Place - Bellarmine 96, Austin Peay 86

=== East - Reading, Pennsylvania ===
Location: Bollman Center Host: Albright College

Regional semifinals Round of 32; March 8
Bloomsburg	76
Mount St. Mary's	61
Philadelphia Textile	60
Hofstra	55

Regional Final; Sweet 16; March 9
Bloomsburg	48
Philadelphia Textile	54

- Third Place - Hofstra 78, Mount St. Mary's 71

=== Mideast - Akron, Ohio ===
Location: Memorial Hall Host: Municipal University of Akron

Regional semifinals Round of 32; March 8
South Carolina State	80
Buffalo	63
Wittenberg	38
Youngstown State	31

Regional Final; Sweet 16; March 9
South Carolina State	63
Wittenberg	70

- Third Place—Youngstown State 65, Buffalo 53

=== Northeast—⁣Boston, Massachusetts ===
Location: Cabot Center Host: Northeastern University

Regional semifinals Round of 32; March 8
Springfield	66
Fairleigh Dickinson	54
Northeastern	74
Assumption	60

Regional Final; Sweet 16; March 9
Springfield	45
Northeastern	47

- Third Place—Assumption 66, Fairleigh Dickinson 51

=== Great Lakes - St. Louis, Missouri ===
Location: Washington Field House Host: Washington University in St. Louis

Regional semifinals Round of 32; March 8
Evansville	66
Concordia (IL)	56
Washington (MO)	71
Augustana (IL)	66

Regional Final; Sweet 16; March 9
Evansville	85
Washington (MO)	76

- Third Place—Concordia 92, Augustana (IL) 84

=== Southwest - Cape Girardeau, Missouri ===
Location: Houck Field House Host: Southeast Missouri State College

Regional semifinals Round of 32; March 8
Lamar	89
Arkansas State	88
Southern Illinois	87
SE Missouri State	79

Regional Final; Sweet 16; March 9
Lamar	84
Southern Illinois	93

- Third Place—Arkansas State 77, SE Missouri State 75

=== Midwest - Brookings, South Dakota ===
Location: The Barn Host: South Dakota State College

Regional semifinals Round of 32; March 8
Nebraska Wesleyan	86
Michigan Tech	69
South Dakota State	71
Cornell (IA)	64

Regional Final; Sweet 16; March 9
Nebraska Wesleyan	75
South Dakota State	77

- Third Place - Michigan Tech 71, Cornell 61

=== Pacific Coast - Fresno, California ===
Location: North Gym Host: Fresno State College

Regional semifinals Round of 32; March 8
Chapman	53
San Francisco State	50
Fresno State	68
UC Santa Barbara	60

Regional Final; Sweet 16; March 9
Chapman	59
Fresno State	71

- Third Place—UC Santa Barbara 58, San Francisco State 56

*denotes each overtime played

== National Finals—⁣Evansville, Indiana ==
Location: Roberts Municipal Stadium Host: Evansville College

National Quarterfinals; Elite Eight; March 13
Oglethorpe	36
Philadelphia Textile	34
Wittenberg	48
Northeastern	47
Evansville	73
Southern Illinois	86
South Dakota State	84
Fresno State	71

National semifinals Final Four; March 14
Oglethorpe	37
Wittenberg	46
Southern Illinois	76
South Dakota State	80

National Championship; March 15
Wittenberg	42
South Dakota State	44

- Third Place—Oglethorpe 68, Southern Illinois 64

*denotes each overtime played

== All-tournament team ==
- Tom Black (South Dakota State)
- Bob Cherry (Wittenberg)
- Bill Fisher (Wittenberg)
- Wayne Rasmussen (South Dakota State)
- Al Thrasher (Wittenberg)

== See also ==
- 1963 NCAA University Division basketball tournament
- 1963 NAIA Basketball Tournament

== Sources ==
- 2010 NCAA Men's Basketball Championship Tournament Records and Statistics: Division II men's basketball Championship
- 1963 NCAA College Division Men's Basketball Tournament jonfmorse.com
