= Don Meineke =

American basketball player

Personal information
- Born: October 30, 1930 Dayton, Ohio, U.S.
- Died: September 3, 2013 (aged 82) Dayton, Ohio, U.S.
- Listed height: 6 ft 7 in (2.01 m)
- Listed weight: 208 lb (94 kg)

Career information
- High school: Wilbur Wright (Dayton, Ohio)
- College: Dayton (1949–1952)
- NBA draft: 1952: 2nd round, 12th overall pick
- Drafted by: Fort Wayne Pistons
- Playing career: 1952–1958
- Position: Power forward
- Number: 54, 17, 5, 22

Career history
- 1952–1955: Fort Wayne Pistons
- 1955–1958: Rochester / Cincinnati Royals

Career highlights
- NBA Rookie of the Year (1953); Consensus second-team All-American (1952)

Career statistics
- Points: 2,338 (6.8 ppg)
- Rebounds: 1,626 (4.7 rpg)
- Assists: 433 (1.3 apg)
- Stats at NBA.com
- Stats at Basketball Reference

Don "Monk" Meineke (October 30, 1930 – September 3, 2013) was an American basketball player. He played college basketball for the University of Dayton and was a consensus second-team All-American in 1952. He later played professionally in the National Basketball Association and won the inaugural Rookie of the Year award in 1953.

== College career ==
Meineke averaged 20.6 points as a junior for the Dayton Flyers, carrying the team to an NIT runner-up finish in 1951. He averaged 21.1 points per game as a senior and led the team to another second-place finish in the NIT in 1952. Meineke was an AP second-team All-American selection after his senior year.

== Professional career ==
Meineke received the National Basketball Association's first Rookie of the Year Award after the 1952–53 NBA season while playing for the Fort Wayne Pistons. He led the league in personal fouls and disqualifications the same season. The 26 disqualifications he had in his first year is still the NBA single-season record. His 334 personal fouls in only 68 games gave him an average of more than 4.9 fouls per game.

Meineke played for the Rochester Royals in the 1955–56 season, and after sitting out the 1956–57 season, rejoined the relocated Cincinnati Royals in 1957–58.

== Personal life ==
Meineke was married to Mary Jane (Hautman) and they had four children.

== NBA career statistics ==
Legend
GP	Games played	GS	Games started	MPG	Minutes per game
FG%	Field goal percentage	3P%	3-point field goal percentage	FT%	Free throw percentage
RPG	Rebounds per game	APG	Assists per game	SPG	Steals per game
BPG	Blocks per game	PPG	Points per game	**Bold**	Career high

=== Regular season ===
Year	Team	GP	MPG	FG%	FT%	RPG	APG	PPG
1952–53	Fort Wayne	68	**33.1**	**.381**	.783	**6.9**	**2.2**	**10.7**
1953–54	Fort Wayne	**71**	20.9	.344	**.805**	5.2	1.1	5.7
1954–55	Fort Wayne	68	15.1	.372	.700	3.6	0.9	5.8
1955–56	Rochester	69	18.1	.372	.700	3.6	1.5	7.1
1957–58	Cincinnati	67	11.8	.356	.647	3.4	0.6	4.9
Career		343	19.8	.367	.756	4.7	1.3	6.8

=== Playoffs ===
Year	Team	GP	MPG	FG%	FT%	RPG	APG	PPG
1953	Fort Wayne	8	**28.4**	.375	.682	3.3	1.3	**7.5**
1954	Fort Wayne	4	21.8	.261	.636	3.8	**1.5**	4.8
1955	Fort Wayne	**11**	14.7	**.450**	**.920**	4.4	0.8	5.4
1958	Cincinnati	2	16.0	.091	.750	**5.5**	0.5	4.0
Career		25	20.3	.351	.750	4.0	1.0	5.8
