= Jim Iverson =

American basketball coach (1930–2020)

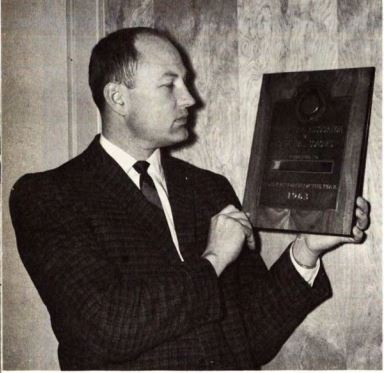
- Iverson receiving a coaching award in 1963

Personal information
- Born: August 22, 1930 Mitchell, South Dakota, U.S.
- Died: October 26, 2020 (aged 90) Fort Wayne, Indiana, U.S.
- Listed height: 5 ft 10 in (1.78 m)
- Listed weight: 170 lb (77 kg)

Career information
- High school: Platte (Platte, South Dakota)
- College: Kansas State (1949–1952)
- NBA draft: 1952: 2nd round, 17th overall pick
- Drafted by: Boston Celtics
- Position: Guard
- Coaching career: 1956–1965

Career history

Coaching
- 1956–1965: South Dakota State

Career highlights
- As coach: NCAA College Division champion (1963); 5× NCC champion (1957, 1959–1961, 1963); NABC College Division Coach of the Year (1963)
- Stats at Basketball Reference

Career coaching record
- College: 142–65 (.686)

James D. Iverson (August 22, 1930 – October 26, 2020) was an American basketball player and coach.

== Career ==
After a college career at Kansas State (KSU), he was drafted by the Boston Celtics in the second round of the 1952 NBA draft. Iverson later coached South Dakota State University from 1956 to 1965, winning the 1963 NCAA College Division Tournament.

Iverson was a high school star at Platte High School in Platte, South Dakota, where he was named all-state three times. He played college basketball at Kansas State, where he started three seasons for coach Jack Gardner. In his three seasons there, the Wildcats won two Big Seven Conference titles and in 1951 played for the NCAA title, losing to the Kentucky Wildcats. Iverson also played baseball at KSU.

Following the close of his Kansas State career, Iverson was drafted in the second round of the 1952 NBA draft by the Boston Celtics. He served two years in the U. S. Army, then joined the Celtics for the 1954–55 preseason. However, he was one of the final cuts for the team.

After his playing career, Iverson coached several service teams in the United States and Japan before earning the head coaching position at South Dakota State (SDSU) in 1956. Iverson had success at SDSU, winning a North Central Conference title in 1959, then leading the Jackrabbits to the National Collegiate Athletic Association (NCAA) College Division title in 1963, defeating Wittenburg 44–42 on a last-second shot. Iverson was ultimately fired in 1965 for providing excessive aid to student athletes, when it came to light that he had given player Maurice White $275.

Iverson died on October 26, 2020, at the age of 90.

== Head coaching record ==
Record table
Season	Team	Overall	Conference	Standing	Postseason
South Dakota State Jackrabbits (North Central Conference) (1956–1965)
1956–57	South Dakota State	19–3	11–1	T–1st	
1957–58	South Dakota State	12–11	9–3	2nd	
1958–59	South Dakota State	17–7	11–1	1st	
1959–60	South Dakota State	17–7	10–2	1st	
1960–61	South Dakota State	21–6	10–2	1st	NCAA College Division Final Four
1961–62	South Dakota State	13–9	7–5	3rd	
1962–63	South Dakota State	22–5	11–1	1st	NCAA College Division Champion
1963–64	South Dakota State	14–7	9–3	2nd	
1964–65	South Dakota State	7–10	2–4	T–4th	
South Dakota State:		142–65 (.686)	80–22 (.784)		
Total:		142–65 (.686)			
National champion Postseason invitational champion Conference regular season champion Conference regular season and conference tournament champion Division regular season champion Division regular season and conference tournament champion Conference tournament champion
