= Jack McMahon =

American basketball player and coach

Personal information
- Born: December 3, 1928 Brooklyn, New York, U.S.
- Died: June 11, 1989 (aged 60) Chicago, Illinois, U.S.
- Listed height: 6 ft 1 in (1.85 m)
- Listed weight: 185 lb (84 kg)

Career information
- High school: St. Michael's (Brooklyn, New York)
- College: St. John's (1949–1952)
- NBA draft: 1952: 6th round, 58th overall pick
- Drafted by: Rochester Royals
- Playing career: 1952–1960
- Position: Point guard / shooting guard
- Number: 03, 3, 24, 21

Career history

Playing
- 1952–1956: Rochester Royals
- 1956–1960: St. Louis Hawks

Coaching
- 1961–1962: Kansas City Steers
- 1962: Chicago Zephyrs
- 1963–1967: Cincinnati Royals
- 1967–1969: San Diego Rockets
- 1970–1972: Pittsburgh Condors

Career highlights
- NBA champion (1958)

Career statistics
- Points: 4,237 (8.1 ppg)
- Rebounds: 1,390 (2.7 rpg)
- Assists: 1,939 (3.7 apg)
- Stats at NBA.com
- Stats at Basketball Reference

John Joseph McMahon (December 3, 1928 – June 11, 1989) was an American professional basketball player and coach. A 6'1" guard from St. John's University, McMahon was selected by the Rochester Royals in the 1952 NBA draft. He played eight seasons in the National Basketball Association (NBA), for Rochester and the St. Louis Hawks.

McMahon became a successful coach in the American Basketball League, the NBA and the American Basketball Association (ABA), with eleven seasons as a head coach in the three leagues. His first coaching stint was with the Kansas City Steers of the ABL (1961–62 season). The following season, he began coaching in the NBA with the Chicago Zephyrs in the 1962–63 season. He would also coach the Cincinnati Royals, the San Diego Rockets, and the ABA's Pittsburgh Condors.

== Career statistics ==
Legend
GP	Games played	GS	Games started	MPG	Minutes per game
FG%	Field goal percentage	3P%	3-point field goal percentage	FT%	Free throw percentage
RPG	Rebounds per game	APG	Assists per game	SPG	Steals per game
BPG	Blocks per game	PPG	Points per game	**Bold**	Career high
†	Won an NBA championship	*	Led the league

=== NBA ===
==== Regular season ====
Year	Team	GP	MPG	FG%	FT%	RPG	APG	PPG
1952–53	Rochester	70	23.8	.330	.657	2.6	2.7	7.2
1953–54	Rochester	71	26.6	**.362**	**.696**	3.0	3.4	**10.0**
1954–55	Rochester	**72**	25.1	.348	.636	2.9	3.4	9.0
1955–56	Rochester	34	25.2	.326	.611	2.5	3.4	7.5
1955–56	St. Louis	36	23.8	.331	.579	2.6	3.0	7.2
1956–57	St. Louis	**72***	**32.6**	.330	.631	**3.1**	**5.1**	8.6
1957–58†	St. Louis	**72***	31.1	.300	.606	2.7	4.6	7.9
1958–59	St. Louis	**72***	31.0	.358	.615	2.3	4.1	8.2
1959–60	St. Louis	25	13.4	.355	.552	1.0	2.0	3.3
Career		524	27.2	.337	.637	2.7	3.7	8.1

==== Playoffs ====
Year	Team	GP	MPG	FG%	FT%	RPG	APG	PPG
1953	Rochester	3	22.0	.400	**.714**	1.7	2.0	8.7
1954	Rochester	6	32.8	.391	.560	4.0	4.0	11.3
1955	Rochester	3	36.3	.405	.643	**5.7**	5.0	**17.3**
1956	St. Louis	8	20.3	.345	.455	1.1	1.9	5.4
1957	St. Louis	10*	37.5	.380	.556	3.8	5.7	12.4
1958†	St. Louis	**11***	30.2	.409	.538	3.4	4.6	7.8
1959	St. Louis	6	**41.7**	.333	.526	3.0	5.3	11.7
1960	St. Louis	2	13.5	**.500**	.000	.5	1.5	2.0
Career		49	31.0	.378	.558	3.0	4.1	9.7

== Head coaching record ==
=== NBA ===
Team	Year	G	W	L	W–L%	Finish	PG	PW	PL	PW–L%	Result
Chicago	1962–63	38	12	26	.429	5th in Western	—	—	—	—	Missed playoffs
Cincinnati	1963–64	80	55	25	.688	2nd in Western	10	4	6	.400	Lost Division finals
Cincinnati	1964–65	80	48	32	.600	2nd in Western	4	1	3	.250	Lost Division semifinals
Cincinnati	1965–66	80	45	35	.563	3rd in Western	5	2	3	.400	Lost Division semifinals
Cincinnati	1966–67	81	39	42	.481	3rd in Western	4	1	3	.250	Lost Division semifinals
San Diego	1967–68	82	15	67	.183	6th in Western	—	—	—	—	Missed playoffs
San Diego	1968–69	82	37	45	.451	4th in Western	6	2	4	.333	Lost Division semifinals
San Diego	1969–70	26	9	17	.346	left mid-season	—	—	—	—	—
Career		549	260	289	.474		29	10	19	.345	

=== ABA ===
Team	Year	G	W	L	W–L%	Finish	PG	PW	PL	PW–L%	Result
Pittsburgh	1970–71	84	36	48	.429	5th in Eastern	—	—	—	—	Missed playoffs
Pittsburgh	1971–72	10	4	6	.400	left mid-season	—	—	—	—	—
Career		94	40	54	.426		0	0	0	–	

Preceded by Buddy Jeannette	Pittsburgh Condors head coach 1970–1972	Succeeded by Mark Binstein
