= NBA Rookie of the Year =

National Basketball Association award

- Sport: Basketball
- League: National Basketball Association
- Awarded for: Best first year player in regular season of the National Basketball Association

History
- First award: 1952–53
- Most recent: Cooper Flagg, Dallas Mavericks (2026)

The National Basketball Association's Rookie of the Year is an annual National Basketball Association (NBA) award given to the top rookie(s) of the regular season. Initiated following the 1952–53 NBA season, it confers the Eddie Gottlieb Trophy, named after the former Philadelphia Warriors head coach. Since the 2022–23 NBA season, winners receive the Wilt Chamberlain Trophy, named after the former Rookie of the Year winner, who also won the regular season MVP and All-Star Game MVP during his rookie season.

The winner is selected by a panel of United States and Canadian sportswriters and broadcasters, each casting first-, second-, and third-place votes (worth five points, three points, and one point, respectively). The player(s) with the highest point total, regardless of the number of first-place votes, wins the award.

The most recent Rookie of the Year winner is Cooper Flagg of the Dallas Mavericks. Twenty-two winners were drafted first overall. Sixteen winners have also won the NBA Most Valuable Player (MVP) award in their careers with Wilt Chamberlain and Wes Unseld earning both honors the same season. Thirty of the non-active winners have been elected to the Naismith Memorial Basketball Hall of Fame. Three seasons had joint winners—Dave Cowens and Geoff Petrie in the 1970–71 season, Grant Hill and Jason Kidd in the 1994–95 season, and Elton Brand and Steve Francis in the 1999–2000 season. Six players won the award unanimously (by capturing all of the first-place votes)—Ralph Sampson, David Robinson, Blake Griffin, Damian Lillard, Karl-Anthony Towns, and Victor Wembanyama.

Patrick Ewing of Jamaica, Pau Gasol of Spain, Kyrie Irving and Ben Simmons of Australia, Andrew Wiggins of Canada, Luka Dončić of Slovenia, and Victor Wembanyama of France are the only winners not born in the United States. Three of these individuals have dual nationality by birth—Wiggins and Simmons have American fathers, and both of Irving's parents are Americans. Ewing immigrated to the Boston area at age 11, Irving moved to the United States at age 2, and Wiggins and Simmons moved to the U.S. while in high school. Gasol, Dončić, and Wembanyama are the only winners trained entirely outside the United States.

Chamberlain (Harlem Globetrotters), Gasol (FC Barcelona of Liga ACB and EuroLeague), Dončić (Real Madrid of Liga ACB and EuroLeague), LaMelo Ball (BC Prienai of the Lithuanian Basketball League, the Los Angeles Ballers of the JBA, and the Illawarra Hawks of the NBL), and Wembanyama (Nanterre 92, ASVEL, and Metropolitans 92 of LNB Élite) all had professional careers outside the NBA prior to being drafted. Ball also had previously won the NBL Rookie of the Year Award.

== Winners ==
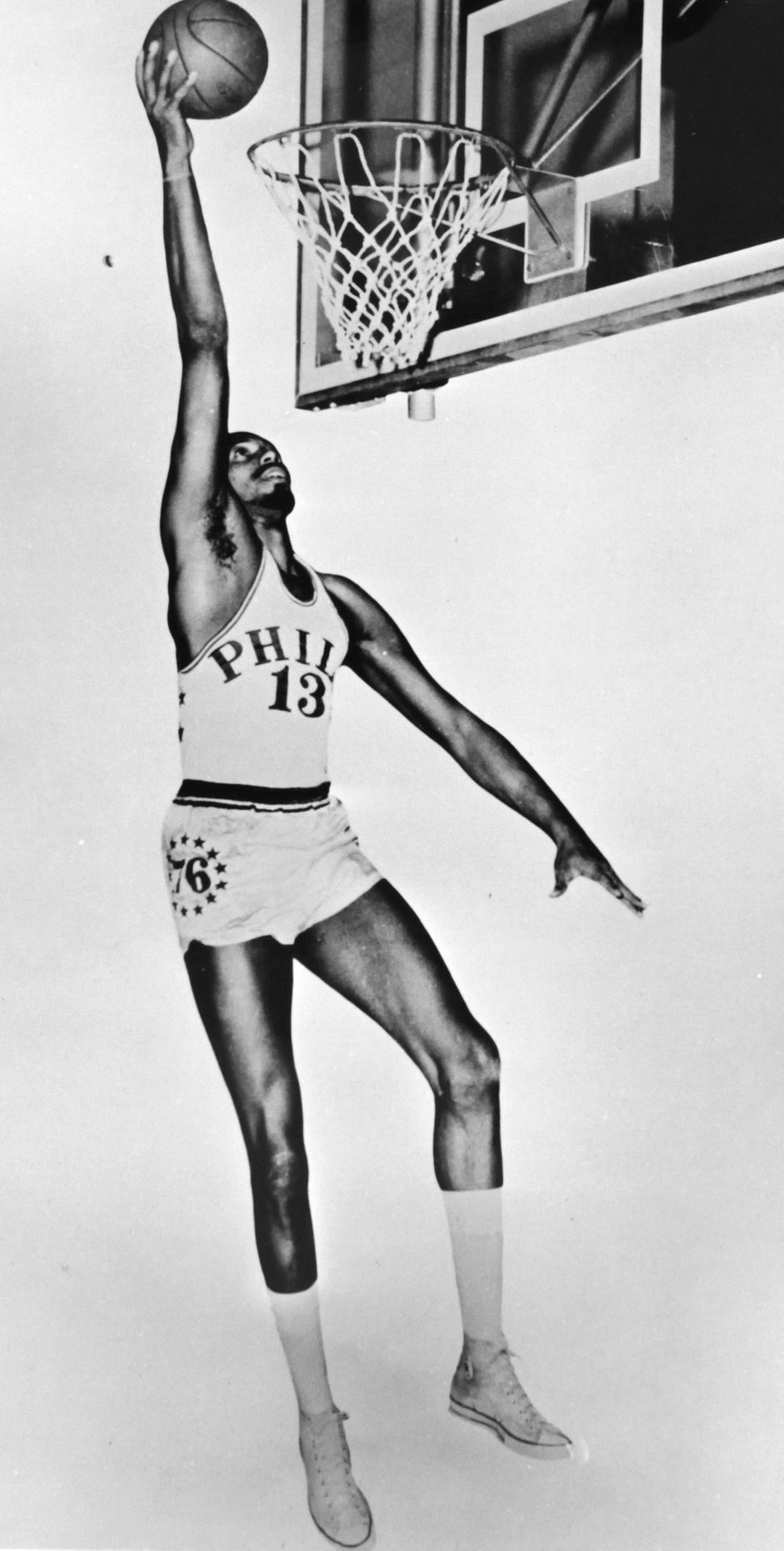
Wilt Chamberlain won the award in the 1959–60 NBA season.

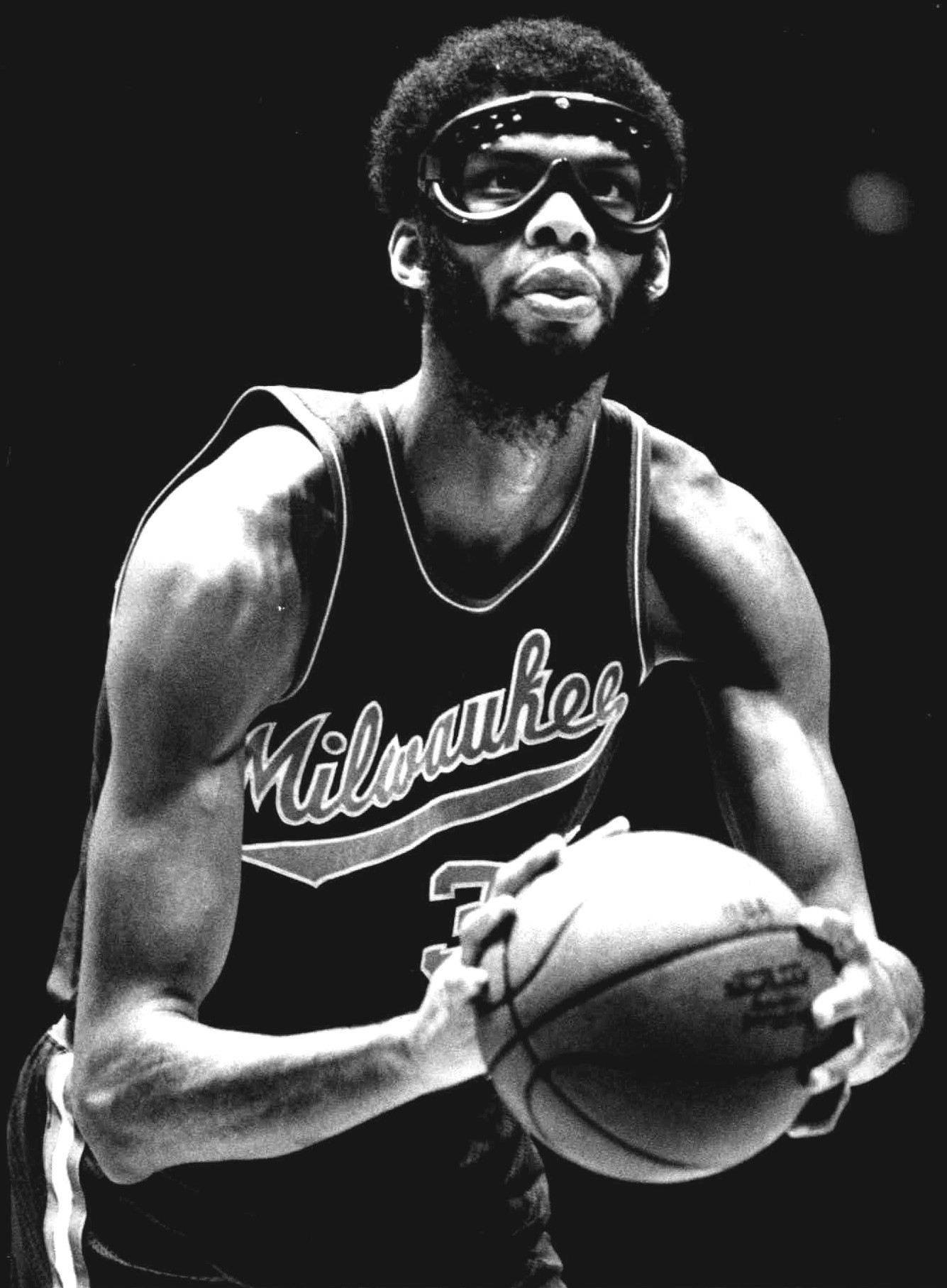
Kareem Abdul-Jabbar (formerly known as Lew Alcindor) won the award unanimously in the 1969–70 NBA season.

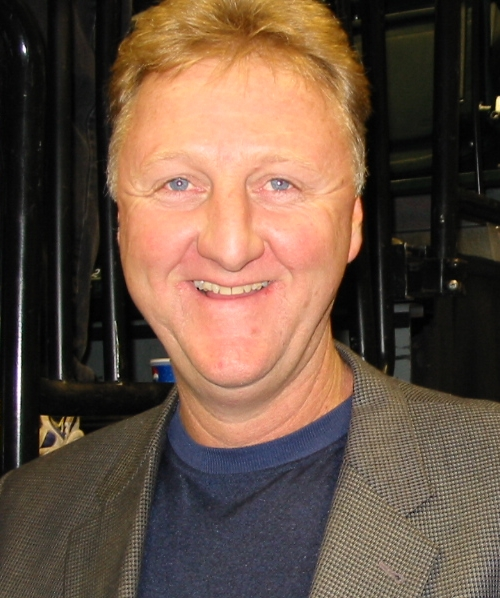
Larry Bird won the award in the 1979–80 NBA season.

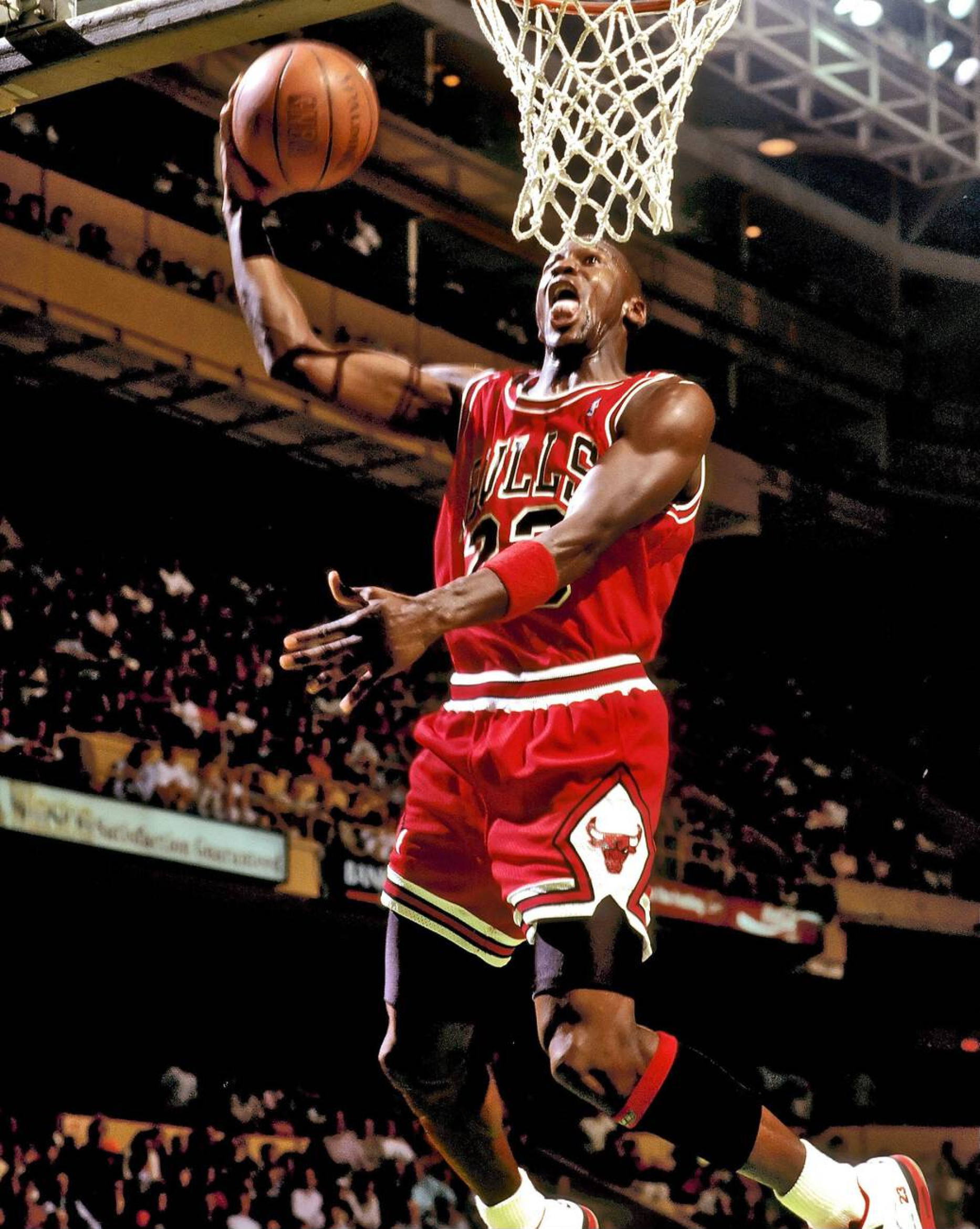
Michael Jordan won the award in the 1984–85 NBA season.

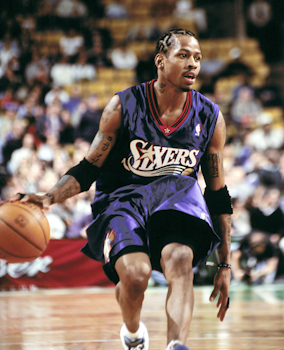
Allen Iverson won the award in the 1996–97 NBA season.

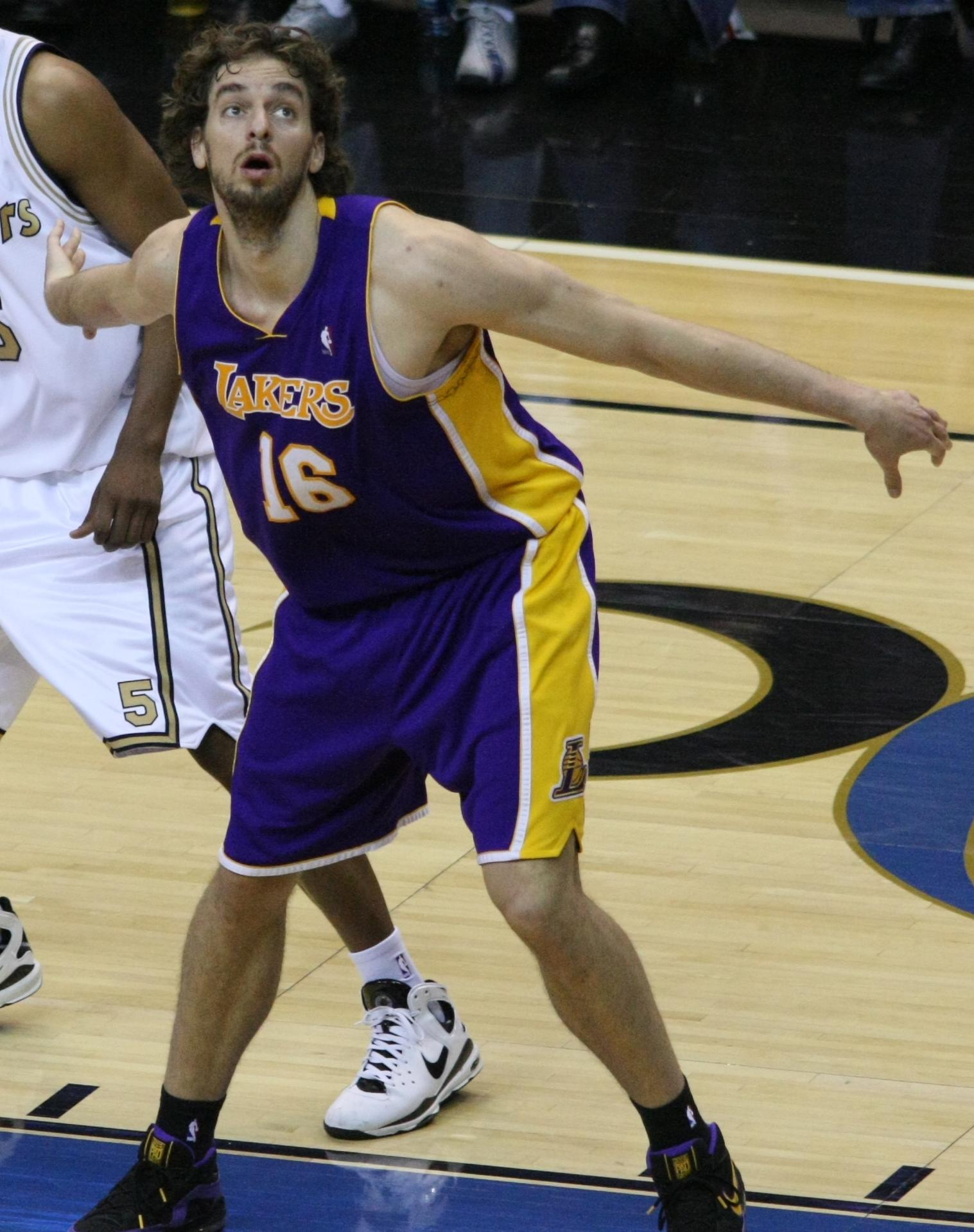
Pau Gasol won the award in the 2001–02 NBA season.

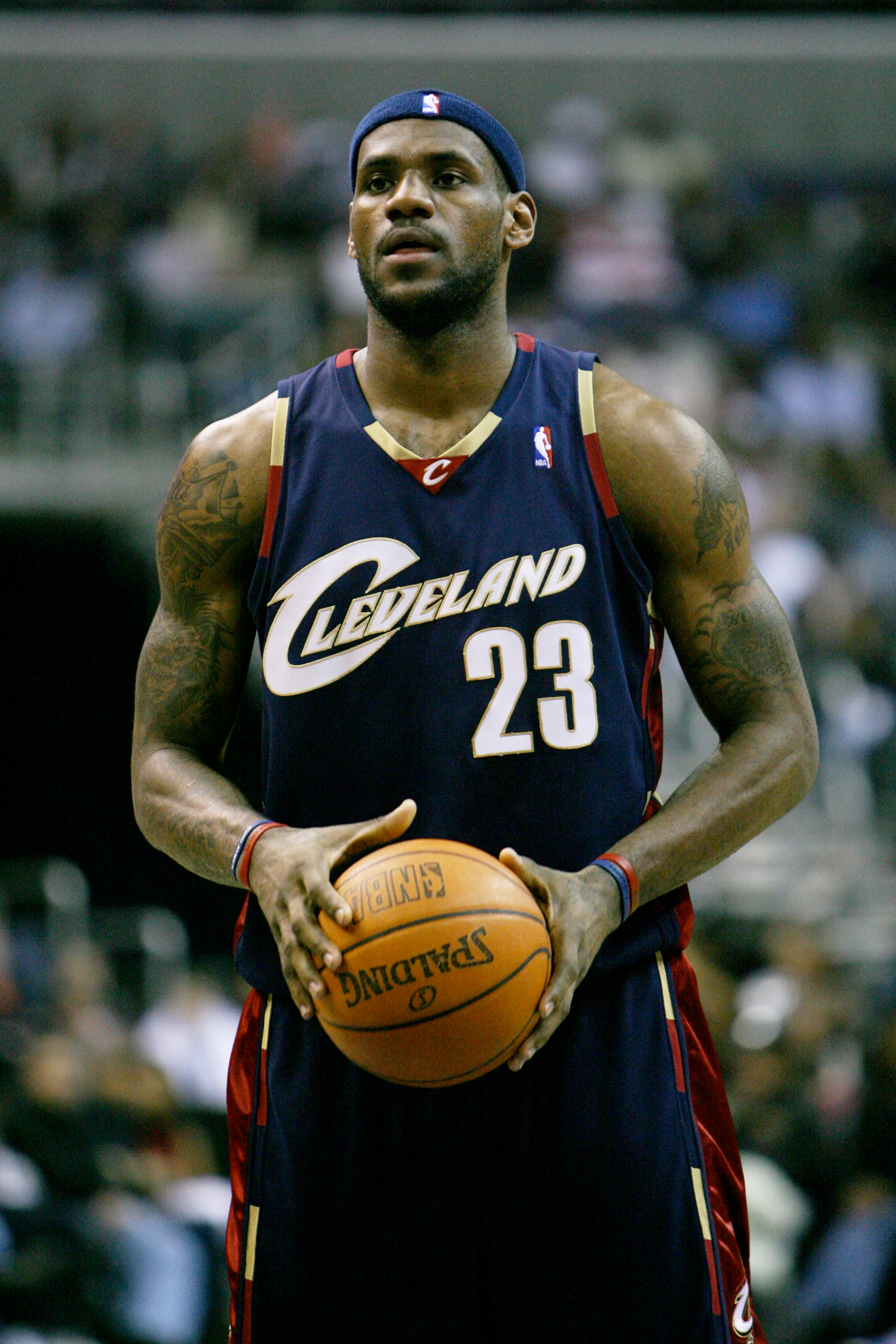
LeBron James won the award in the 2003–04 NBA season.

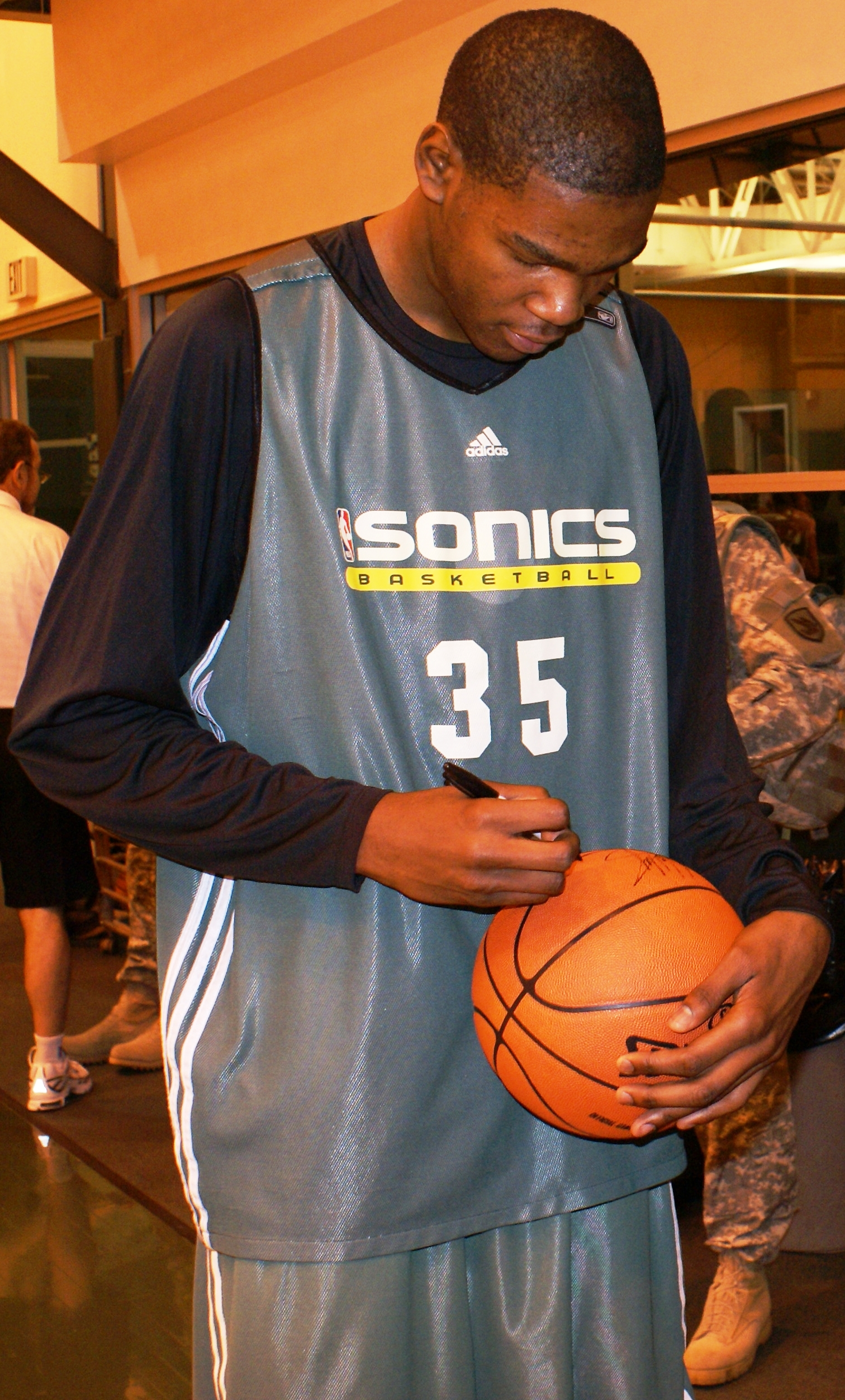
Kevin Durant won the award in the 2007–08 NBA season.

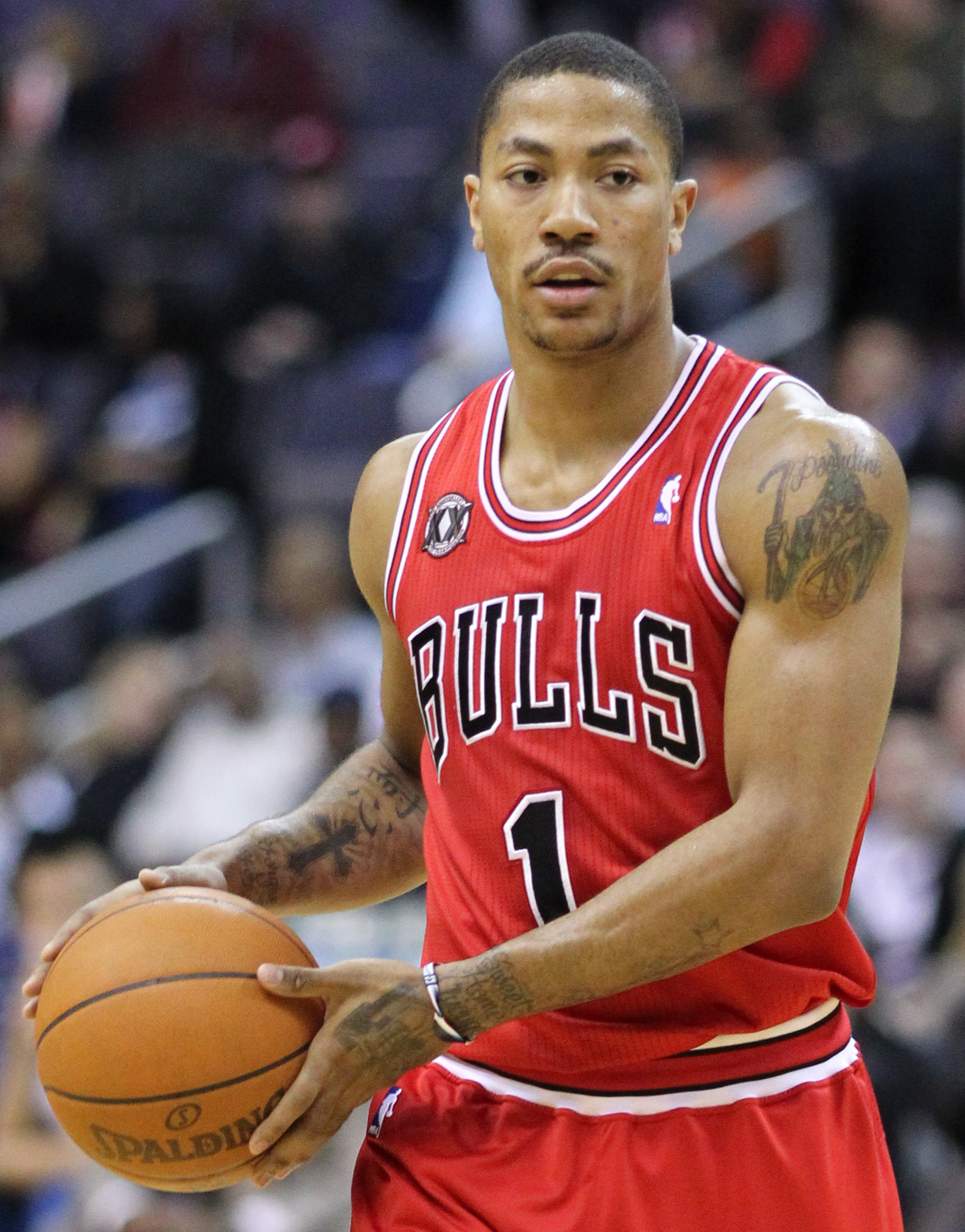
Derrick Rose won the award in the 2008–09 NBA season.

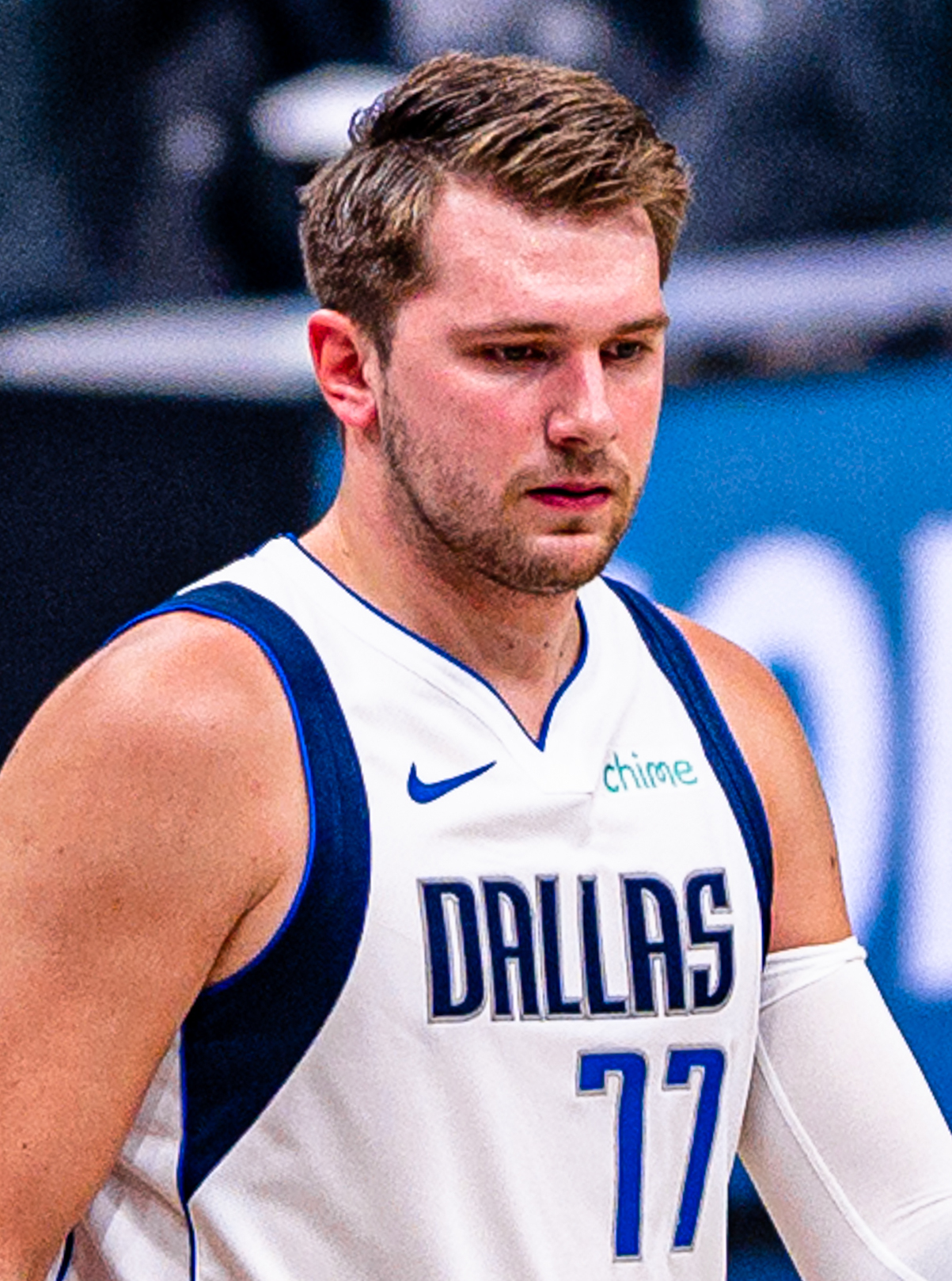
Luka Dončić won the award in the 2018–19 NBA season.

Key
| ^ | Denotes player who is still active in the NBA |
| * | Elected to the Naismith Memorial Basketball Hall of Fame as player |
| † | Not yet eligible for Hall of Fame consideration (Note: A player is not eligible for induction into the Naismith Memorial Basketball Hall of Fame until he has been fully retired for two calendar years.) |
| Player (in bold text) | Denotes unanimous winners |
| DP # | Draft pick number |
| DY | Draft year |
| T | Territorial pick |

Rookie of the Year
| Season | Player | Position | Nationality | Team | School/Prior Experience | DP # | DY |
|---|---|---|---|---|---|---|---|
| 1952–53 | Don Meineke | Forward/center | United States | Fort Wayne Pistons | Dayton | 12 | 1952 |
| 1953–54 | Ray Felix | Center | United States | Baltimore Bullets | Long Island | 1 | 1953 |
| 1954–55 | Bob Pettit* | Forward/center | United States | Milwaukee Hawks | LSU | 2 | 1954 |
| 1955–56 | Maurice Stokes* | Forward/center | United States | Rochester Royals | Saint Francis (PA) | 2 | 1955 |
| 1956–57 | Tom Heinsohn* | Forward | United States | Boston Celtics | Holy Cross | T | 1956 |
| 1957–58 | Woody Sauldsberry | Forward/center | United States | Philadelphia Warriors | Texas Southern | 60 | 1957 |
| 1958–59 | Elgin Baylor* | Forward | United States | Minneapolis Lakers | Seattle | 1 | 1958 |
| 1959–60 | Wilt Chamberlain* (Note: Won the NBA Most Valuable Player Award in same year.) | Center | United States | Philadelphia Warriors (2) | Kansas, Harlem Globetrotters | T | 1959 |
| 1960–61 | Oscar Robertson* | Guard | United States | Cincinnati Royals (2) | Cincinnati | 1/T | 1960 |
| 1961–62 | Walt Bellamy* | Center | United States | Chicago Packers (2) | Indiana | 1 | 1961 |
| 1962–63 | Terry Dischinger | Forward/guard | United States | Chicago Zephyrs (3) | Purdue | 8 | 1962 |
| 1963–64 | Jerry Lucas* (Note: Though drafted in 1962 by the Cincinnati Royals, Jerry Lucas did not sign with the team until 1963 when he tried to sign with the Cleveland Pipers of the American Basketball League instead. He ended up sitting out the year when the deal fell through. His rookie season with the Royals began in the 1963–64 season.) | Forward/center | United States | Cincinnati Royals (3) | Ohio State | T | 1962 |
| 1964–65 | Willis Reed* | Center/forward | United States | New York Knicks | Grambling | 8 | 1964 |
| 1965–66 | Rick Barry* | Forward | United States | San Francisco Warriors (3) | Miami (FL) | 2 | 1965 |
| 1966–67 | Dave Bing* | Guard | United States | Detroit Pistons (2) | Syracuse | 2 | 1966 |
| 1967–68 | Earl Monroe* | Guard | United States | Baltimore Bullets (4) | Winston-Salem State | 2 | 1967 |
| 1968–69 | Wes Unseld* | Center/forward | United States | Baltimore Bullets (5) | Louisville | 2 | 1968 |
| 1969–70 | Lew Alcindor* | Center | United States | Milwaukee Bucks | UCLA | 1 | 1969 |
| 1970–71 (Note: Denotes seasons in which joint winners were named) | Dave Cowens* | Center/forward | United States | Boston Celtics (2) | Florida State | 4 | 1970 |
| 1970–71 | Geoff Petrie | Guard | United States | Portland Trail Blazers | Princeton | 8 | 1970 |
| 1971–72 | Sidney Wicks | Forward/center | United States | Portland Trail Blazers (2) | UCLA | 2 | 1971 |
| 1972–73 | Bob McAdoo* | Center/forward | United States | Buffalo Braves | North Carolina (Jr.) | 2 | 1972 |
| 1973–74 | Ernie DiGregorio | Guard | United States | Buffalo Braves (2) | Providence (Sr.) | 3 | 1973 |
| 1974–75 | Jamaal Wilkes* | Forward/guard | United States | Golden State Warriors (4) | UCLA (Sr.) | 11 | 1974 |
| 1975–76 | Alvan Adams | Center/forward | United States | Phoenix Suns | Oklahoma (Jr.) | 4 | 1975 |
| 1976–77 | Adrian Dantley* | Forward/guard | United States | Buffalo Braves (3) | Notre Dame (Jr.) | 6 | 1976 |
| 1977–78 | Walter Davis* | Guard/forward | United States | Phoenix Suns (2) | North Carolina (Sr.) | 5 | 1977 |
| 1978–79 | Phil Ford | Guard | United States | Kansas City Kings (4) | North Carolina (Sr.) | 2 | 1978 |
| 1979–80 | Larry Bird* (Note: Though drafted in 1978 by the Boston Celtics, Larry Bird opted to stay in college for his senior year and did not play in the NBA until 1979. His rookie season with the Celtics began in the 1979–80 season.) | Forward | United States | Boston Celtics (3) | Indiana State (Jr.) | 6 | 1978 |
| 1980–81 | Darrell Griffith | Guard | United States | Utah Jazz | Louisville (Sr.) | 2 | 1980 |
| 1981–82 | Buck Williams | Forward/center | United States | New Jersey Nets | Maryland (Jr.) | 3 | 1981 |
| 1982–83 | Terry Cummings | Forward | United States | San Diego Clippers (4) | DePaul (Jr.) | 2 | 1982 |
| 1983–84 | **Ralph Sampson*** | Center/forward | United States | Houston Rockets | Virginia (Sr.) | 1 | 1983 |
| 1984–85 | Michael Jordan* | Guard | United States | Chicago Bulls | North Carolina (Jr.) | 3 | 1984 |
| 1985–86 | Patrick Ewing* | Center | United States (Note: Patrick Ewing was born in Jamaica, but had become a naturalized United States citizen while playing college basketball at Georgetown. He represented the United States at the 1984 Summer Olympics.) | New York Knicks (2) | Georgetown (Sr.) | 1 | 1985 |
| 1986–87 | Chuck Person | Forward | United States | Indiana Pacers | Auburn (Sr.) | 4 | 1986 |
| 1987–88 | Mark Jackson | Guard | United States | New York Knicks (3) | St. John's (Sr.) | 18 | 1987 |
| 1988–89 | Mitch Richmond* | Guard | United States | Golden State Warriors (5) | Kansas State (Sr.) | 5 | 1988 |
| 1989–90 | **David Robinson*** (Note: Though drafted in 1987 by the San Antonio Spurs, David Robinson did not play in the NBA until 1989 due to commitments to the United States Navy. His rookie season with the Spurs began in the 1989–90 season.) | Center | United States | San Antonio Spurs | Navy (Sr.) | 1 | 1987 |
| 1990–91 | Derrick Coleman | Forward | United States | New Jersey Nets (2) | Syracuse (Sr.) | 1 | 1990 |
| 1991–92 | Larry Johnson | Forward | United States | Charlotte Hornets | UNLV (Sr.) | 1 | 1991 |
| 1992–93 | Shaquille O'Neal* | Center | United States | Orlando Magic | LSU (Jr.) | 1 | 1992 |
| 1993–94 | Chris Webber* | Forward/center | United States | Golden State Warriors (6) | Michigan (So.) | 1 | 1993 |
| 1994–95 | Grant Hill* | Forward/guard | United States | Detroit Pistons (3) | Duke (Sr.) | 3 | 1994 |
| 1994–95 | Jason Kidd* | Guard | United States | Dallas Mavericks | California (So.) | 2 | 1994 |
| 1995–96 | Damon Stoudamire | Guard | United States | Toronto Raptors | Arizona (Sr.) | 7 | 1995 |
| 1996–97 | Allen Iverson* | Guard | United States | Philadelphia 76ers | Georgetown (So.) | 1 | 1996 |
| 1997–98 | Tim Duncan* | Forward/center | United States (Note: Because Tim Duncan is a United States citizen by birth, as are all natives of the U.S. Virgin Islands, he was able to play for the U.S. internationally. He represented the United States at the 2004 Summer Olympics) | San Antonio Spurs (2) | Wake Forest (Sr.) | 1 | 1997 |
| 1998–99 | Vince Carter* | Guard/forward | United States | Toronto Raptors (2) | North Carolina (Jr.) | 5 | 1998 |
| 1999–00 | Elton Brand | Forward | United States | Chicago Bulls (2) | Duke (So.) | 1 | 1999 |
| 1999–00 | Steve Francis | Guard | United States | Houston Rockets (2) | Maryland (Jr.) | 2 | 1999 |
| 2000–01 | Mike Miller | Forward/guard | United States | Orlando Magic (2) | Florida (So.) | 5 | 2000 |
| 2001–02 | Pau Gasol* | Forward/center | Spain | Memphis Grizzlies | FC Barcelona (Spain) | 3 | 2001 |
| 2002–03 | Amare Stoudemire* | Forward/center | United States | Phoenix Suns (3) | Cypress Creek HS (Orlando, Florida) | 9 | 2002 |
| 2003–04 | LeBron James^ | Forward | United States | Cleveland Cavaliers | St. Vincent–St. Mary HS (Akron, Ohio) | 1 | 2003 |
| 2004–05 | Emeka Okafor | Center/forward | United States | Charlotte Bobcats (2) | UConn (Jr.) | 2 | 2004 |
| 2005–06 | Chris Paul^{†} | Guard | United States | New Orleans/Oklahoma City Hornets | Wake Forest (So.) | 4 | 2005 |
| 2006–07 | Brandon Roy | Guard | United States | Portland Trail Blazers (3) | Washington (Sr.) | 6 | 2006 |
| 2007–08 | Kevin Durant^ | Forward | United States | Seattle SuperSonics | Texas (Fr.) | 2 | 2007 |
| 2008–09 | Derrick Rose^{†} | Guard | United States | Chicago Bulls (3) | Memphis (Fr.) | 1 | 2008 |
| 2009–10 | Tyreke Evans | Guard/forward | United States | Sacramento Kings (5) | Memphis (Fr.) | 4 | 2009 |
| 2010–11 | **Blake Griffin** (Note: Though drafted in 2009 by the Los Angeles Clippers, Blake Griffin missed the entire 2009–10 season due to a knee injury. His rookie season with the Clippers was the 2010–11 season.) | Forward | United States | Los Angeles Clippers (5) | Oklahoma (So.) | 1 | 2009 |
| 2011–12 | Kyrie Irving^ | Guard | United States | Cleveland Cavaliers (2) | Duke (Fr.) | 1 | 2011 |
| 2012–13 | **Damian Lillard**^ | Guard | United States | Portland Trail Blazers (4) | Weber St. (Jr.) | 6 | 2012 |
| 2013–14 | Michael Carter-Williams | Guard | United States | Philadelphia 76ers (2) | Syracuse (So.) | 11 | 2013 |
| 2014–15 | Andrew Wiggins^ | Forward/guard | Canada | Minnesota Timberwolves | Kansas (Fr.) | 1 | 2014 |
| 2015–16 | **Karl-Anthony Towns**^ | Center | Dominican Republic (Note: Karl-Anthony Towns was born and raised in the United States to an American father and a Dominican mother. He has represented the Dominican Republic internationally since 2012.) | Minnesota Timberwolves (2) | Kentucky (Fr.) | 1 | 2015 |
| 2016–17 | Malcolm Brogdon^{†} | Guard | United States | Milwaukee Bucks (2) | Virginia (Sr.) | 36 | 2016 |
| 2017–18 | Ben Simmons^{†} | Guard | Australia | Philadelphia 76ers (3) | LSU (Fr.) | 1 | 2016 (Note: Though drafted in 2016 by the Philadelphia 76ers, Ben Simmons missed the entire 2016–17 season due to a broken right foot. His rookie season with the Sixers was the 2017–18 season.) |
| 2018–19 | Luka Dončić^ | Guard/forward | Slovenia | Dallas Mavericks (2) | Real Madrid (Spain) | 3 | 2018 |
| 2019–20 | Ja Morant^ | Guard | United States | Memphis Grizzlies (2) | Murray State (So.) | 2 | 2019 |
| 2020–21 | LaMelo Ball^ | Guard | United States | Charlotte Hornets (3) | Illawarra Hawks (Australia) | 3 | 2020 |
| 2021–22 | Scottie Barnes^ | Forward | United States | Toronto Raptors (3) | Florida State (Fr.) | 4 | 2021 |
| 2022–23 | Paolo Banchero^ | Forward | United States | Orlando Magic (3) | Duke (Fr.) | 1 | 2022 |
| 2023–24 | **Victor Wembanyama**^ | Center | France | San Antonio Spurs (3) | Metropolitans 92 (France) | 1 | 2023 |
| 2024–25 | Stephon Castle^ | Guard | United States | San Antonio Spurs (4) | UConn (Fr.) | 4 | 2024 |
| 2025–26 | Cooper Flagg^ | Forward | United States | Dallas Mavericks (3) | Duke (Fr.) | 1 | 2025 |

== Unofficial winners ==
Prior to the 1952–53 season, the Rookie of the Year was selected by newspaper writers; however, the NBA does not officially recognize those players as winners. The league published the pre-1953 winners in their 1994–95 edition of the Official NBA Guide and the 1994 Official NBA Basketball Encyclopedia, but those winners have not been listed in subsequent publications.

Pre-1953 NBA Rookies of the Year
| Season | Player | Position | Nationality | Team | DP # | DY |
|---|---|---|---|---|---|---|
| 1947–48 | Paul Hoffman | Guard/forward | United States | Baltimore Bullets | 70 | 1947 |
| 1948–49 | Howie Shannon | Guard/forward | United States | Providence Steamrollers | 1 | 1949 |
| 1949–50 | Alex Groza | Center | United States | Indianapolis Olympians | 2 | 1949 |
| 1950–51 | Paul Arizin* | Forward/guard | United States | Philadelphia Warriors | T | 1950 |
| 1951–52 | Bill Tosheff | Guard | United States | Indianapolis Olympians | 32 | 1951 |
| 1951–52 | Mel Hutchins | Forward/center | United States | Milwaukee Hawks | 2 | 1951 |

== Teams ==
| Awards | Teams | Players | Years |
|---|---|---|---|
| 6 | Golden State Warriors / San Francisco Warriors / Philadelphia Warriors | Woody Sauldsberry, Wilt Chamberlain, Rick Barry, Jamaal Wilkes, Mitch Richmond, Chris Webber | 1958, 1960 (as Philadelphia); 1966 (as San Francisco); 1975, 1989, 1994 |
| 5 | Los Angeles Clippers / San Diego Clippers / Buffalo Braves | Bob McAdoo, Ernie DiGregorio, Adrian Dantley, Terry Cummings, Blake Griffin | 1973, 1974, 1977 (as Buffalo); 1983 (as San Diego); 2011 |
| 5 | Sacramento Kings / Kansas City Kings / Cincinnati Royals / Rochester Royals | Maurice Stokes, Oscar Robertson, Jerry Lucas, Phil Ford, Tyreke Evans | 1956 (as Rochester); 1961, 1964 (as Cincinnati); 1979 (as Kansas City) 2010 |
| 4 | Portland Trail Blazers | Geoff Petrie, Sidney Wicks, Brandon Roy, Damian Lillard | 1971, 1972, 2007, 2013 |
| 4 | Washington Wizards / Baltimore Bullets / Chicago Zephyrs / Chicago Packers | Walt Bellamy, Terry Dischinger, Earl Monroe, Wes Unseld | 1962 (as Chicago Packers); 1963 (as Chicago Zephyrs); 1968, 1969 (as Baltimore) |
| 4 | San Antonio Spurs | David Robinson, Tim Duncan, Victor Wembanyama, Stephon Castle | 1990, 1998, 2024, 2025 |
| 3 | Boston Celtics | Tom Heinsohn, Dave Cowens, Larry Bird | 1957, 1971, 1980 |
| 3 | Charlotte Hornets / Charlotte Bobcats | Larry Johnson, Emeka Okafor, LaMelo Ball | 1992, 2005 (as Charlotte Bobcats), 2021 |
| 3 | Chicago Bulls | Michael Jordan, Elton Brand, Derrick Rose | 1985, 2000, 2009 |
| 3 | Dallas Mavericks | Jason Kidd, Luka Dončić, Cooper Flagg | 1995, 2019, 2026 |
| 3 | Detroit Pistons / Fort Wayne Pistons | Don Meineke, Dave Bing, Grant Hill | 1953 (as Fort Wayne), 1967, 1995 |
| 3 | New York Knicks | Willis Reed, Patrick Ewing, Mark Jackson | 1965, 1986, 1988 |
| 3 | Orlando Magic | Shaquille O'Neal, Mike Miller, Paolo Banchero | 1993, 2001, 2023 |
| 3 | Philadelphia 76ers | Allen Iverson, Michael Carter-Williams, Ben Simmons | 1997, 2014, 2018 |
| 3 | Phoenix Suns | Alvan Adams, Walter Davis, Amare Stoudemire | 1976, 1978, 2003 |
| 3 | Toronto Raptors | Damon Stoudamire, Vince Carter, Scottie Barnes | 1996, 1999, 2022 |
| 2 | Brooklyn Nets / New Jersey Nets | Buck Williams, Derrick Coleman | 1982 (as New Jersey), 1991 (as New Jersey) |
| 2 | Cleveland Cavaliers | LeBron James, Kyrie Irving | 2004, 2012 |
| 2 | Houston Rockets | Ralph Sampson, Steve Francis | 1984, 2000 |
| 2 | Memphis Grizzlies | Pau Gasol, Ja Morant | 2002, 2020 |
| 2 | Milwaukee Bucks | Lew Alcindor, Malcolm Brogdon | 1970, 2017 |
| 2 | Minnesota Timberwolves | Andrew Wiggins, Karl-Anthony Towns | 2015, 2016 |
| 1 | Atlanta Hawks / Milwaukee Hawks | Bob Pettit | 1955 (as Milwaukee) |
| 1 | Baltimore Bullets | Ray Felix | 1954 |
| 1 | Indiana Pacers | Chuck Person | 1987 |
| 1 | Los Angeles Lakers / Minneapolis Lakers | Elgin Baylor | 1959 (as Minneapolis) |
| 1 | New Orleans Pelicans / Oklahoma City Hornets | Chris Paul | 2006 (as New Orleans/Oklahoma City Hornets) |
| 1 | Oklahoma City Thunder / Seattle SuperSonics | Kevin Durant | 2008 (as Seattle) |
| 1 | Utah Jazz | Darrell Griffith | 1981 |
| 0 | Denver Nuggets | None | |
| 0 | Miami Heat | None | |

== See also ==
- NBA G League Rookie of the Year Award
- NBA Rookie of the Month Award
- NBL (United States) Rookie of the Year Award
- List of NBA regular season records
