= Headrick, Oklahoma =

- Town
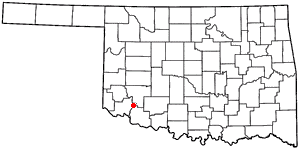
- Location of Headrick, Oklahoma
- Coordinates: 34°37′36″N 99°08′14″W
- Country: United States
- State: Oklahoma
- County: Jackson

Area
  - Total: 0.22 sq mi (0.57 km^{2})
  - Land: 0.22 sq mi (0.57 km^{2})
  - Water: 0 sq mi (0.00 km^{2})
- Elevation: 1,362 ft (415 m)

Population (2020)
  - Total: 74
  - Density: 334.4/sq mi (129.12/km^{2})
- Time zone: UTC-6 (Central (CST))
  - Summer (DST): UTC-5 (CDT)
- ZIP code: 73549
- Area code: 580
- FIPS code: 40-33300
- GNIS feature ID: 2412741

Headrick is a town in Jackson County, Oklahoma, United States. As of the 2020 census, Headrick had a population of 74.

== Geography ==
Headrick is located in eastern Jackson County 0.5 miles (0.8 km) south of U.S. Route 62 and 11 miles (18 km) east of Altus, the county seat.

According to the United States Census Bureau, the town has a total area of 0.2 square miles (0.5 km^{2}), all land.

== Demographics ==
Historical population
Census	Pop.	Note	%±
1910	270		—
1920	280		3.7%
1930	243		−13.2%
1940	174		−28.4%
1950	144		−17.2%
1960	152		5.6%
1970	139		−8.6%
1980	223		60.4%
1990	183		−17.9%
2000	130		−29.0%
2010	94		−27.7%
2020	74		−21.3%
U.S. Decennial Census

=== 2020 census ===
As of the 2020 census, Headrick had a population of 74. The median age was 48.5 years. 21.6% of residents were under the age of 18 and 25.7% of residents were 65 years of age or older. For every 100 females there were 80.5 males, and for every 100 females age 18 and over there were 93.3 males age 18 and over.

0.0% of residents lived in urban areas, while 100.0% lived in rural areas.

There were 40 households in Headrick, of which 32.5% had children under the age of 18 living in them. Of all households, 50.0% were married-couple households, 27.5% were households with a male householder and no spouse or partner present, and 20.0% were households with a female householder and no spouse or partner present. About 22.5% of all households were made up of individuals and 22.5% had someone living alone who was 65 years of age or older.

There were 47 housing units, of which 14.9% were vacant. The homeowner vacancy rate was 0.0% and the rental vacancy rate was 33.3%.

Racial composition as of the 2020 census
Race	Number	Percent
White	63	85.1%
Black or African American	0	0.0%
American Indian and Alaska Native	1	1.4%
Asian	0	0.0%
Native Hawaiian and Other Pacific Islander	0	0.0%
Some other race	1	1.4%
Two or more races	9	12.2%
Hispanic or Latino (of any race)	5	6.8%

=== 2000 census ===
As of the census of 2000, there were 130 people, 49 households, and 39 families residing in the town. The population density was 614.8 inhabitants per square mile (237.4/km^{2}). There were 62 housing units at an average density of 293.2 per square mile (113.2/km^{2}). The racial makeup of the town was 82.31% White, 4.62% Native American, 0.77% Pacific Islander, 10.77% from other races, and 1.54% from two or more races. Hispanic or Latino of any race were 13.08% of the population.

There were 49 households, out of which 36.7% had children under the age of 18 living with them, 67.3% were married couples living together, 10.2% had a female householder with no husband present, and 20.4% were non-families. 18.4% of all households were made up of individuals, and 8.2% had someone living alone who was 65 years of age or older. The average household size was 2.65 and the average family size was 3.00.

In the town, the population was spread out, with 25.4% under the age of 18, 8.5% from 18 to 24, 23.8% from 25 to 44, 29.2% from 45 to 64, and 13.1% who were 65 years of age or older. The median age was 38 years. For every 100 females, there were 116.7 males. For every 100 females age 18 and over, there were 106.4 males.

The median income for a household in the town was $28,125, and the median income for a family was $23,750. Males had a median income of $30,000 versus $15,893 for females. The per capita income for the town was $11,388. There were 27.3% of families and 25.0% of the population living below the poverty line, including 32.4% of under eighteens and 21.1% of those over 64.
