= 1954–55 Baltimore Bullets season =

Aborted NBA professional basketball team season

- Head coach: Clair Bee (2–9); Albert Barthelme (1–2)
- Arena: Baltimore Coliseum

Results
- Record: 3–11 (.214)
- Stats at Basketball Reference
- Radio: WCBM

The 1954–55 Baltimore Bullets season was the Bullets' 8th season in the NBA and eleventh and final overall season of existence. After losing their November 19 game in a 103–92 defeat to the Fort Wayne Pistons for a 2–9 start to the season, the Bullets fired head coach Clair Bee, replacing him with assistant coach, former University of Baltimore head coach, Albert Barthelme for what became the team's final three games of their franchise history. The franchise ceased operations on November 27, 1954, after tallying a 3–11 record. The NBA does not officially recognize the 1954–55 Bullets' games and statistics, including the games coached by both Clair Bee and replacement coach Albert Barthelme during this season. For the upcoming 1955–56 NBA season, one ownership group in Baltimore, Maryland and another in Washington, D.C. bid money in hopes of resurrecting a Baltimore Bullets franchise that would absorb the previous team's history, but the NBA rejected the groups' offers on April 13, 1955, the same day of the 1955 NBA draft. The D.C. group - the Washington Professional Basketball Corporation - threatened to file an antitrust lawsuit against the NBA worth $1 million, claiming the league conspired in preventing them from buying the bankrupt team a month afterward. The two groups later reached a settlement on January 24, 1956.

Baltimore went without an NBA team until 1963, when the Chicago Zephyrs moved to Baltimore and became the second incarnation of the Baltimore Bullets. Following their move from Chicago, the new Baltimore did not claim the old Bullets' history as part of their own.

== Draft picks ==
Round	Pick	Player	Position(s)	Nationality	College
1	1	Frank Selvy	SG/SF	United States	Furman
2	7	Bobby Leonard	PG	United States	Indiana
3	16	Werner Killen	PF/C	United States	Lawrence Institute of Technology
4	25	Burt Spice	F	United States	Toledo
5	34	Lou Scott	C	United States	Indiana
6	43	Bob Heim	SG	United States	Xavier
7	52	Joe Pehanick	C	United States	Seattle
8	61	Harry Brooks	PG	United States	Seton Hall
9	70	Ron Goerrs	C	United States	Concordia Seminary
10	78	Gary Shivers	PF/C	United States	Houston
11	87	Elliot Karver	SG	United States	George Washington

Baltimore were only active in the 1954 draft's first 11 rounds before opting out from the 12th and 13th rounds. The Bullets had the first overall pick in the draft, with whom they selected Frank Selvy. This was the third and final time in Bullets franchise history – and second consecutive instance of such, having picked Ray Felix in the 1953 draft – that they were granted the first overall pick.

== Roster ==
1954–55 Baltimore Bullets roster
Players

Pos.	No.	Player	Height	Weight	DOB	From
SG	20	Rollen Hans	6 ft 2 in (1.88 m)	210 lb (95 kg)		Long Island
F/C	17	Don Henriksen	6 ft 7 in (2.01 m)	225 lb (102 kg)		California
G/F	11	Paul Hoffman	6 ft 2 in (1.88 m)	195 lb (88 kg)		Purdue
F/C	10	Bob Houbregs	6 ft 8 in (2.03 m)	225 lb (102 kg)		Washington
F	22	Dan King	6 ft 6 in (1.98 m)	220 lb (100 kg)		Western Kentucky
PG	7	Al McGuire	6 ft 2 in (1.88 m)	180 lb (82 kg)		St. John's
SG	9	Ken Murray	6 ft 2 in (1.88 m)	190 lb (86 kg)		St. Bonaventure
C	18	Jim Neal	6 ft 11 in (2.11 m)	235 lb (107 kg)		Wofford
SF	12	Al Roges	6 ft 4 in (1.93 m)	195 lb (88 kg)		Long Island
G/F	28	Frank Selvy	6 ft 3 in (1.91 m)	180 lb (82 kg)		Furman
SF	17	Joe Smyth	6 ft 3 in (1.91 m)	215 lb (98 kg)		Niagara
F/C	19	Connie Simmons	6 ft 8 in (2.03 m)	222 lb (101 kg)		Flushing High School

Coaches
Head coach
- Clair Bee (fired)
- Albert Barthelme

Legend
- (DP) Unsigned draft pick
- (FA) Free agent
- (S) Suspended
- Injured

== Regular season ==
=== Game log ===
1954–55 Game log
#	Date	Opponent	Score	Record
1	October 30	Syracuse	L 67–69	0–1
2	October 31	vs. Philadelphia	L 97–102	0–2
3	November 3	Minneapolis	W 93–92	1–2
4	November 6	@ Rochester	L 80–128	1–3
5	November 7	Boston	L 99–101	1–4
6	November 11	vs. Minneapolis	L 87–97	1–5
7	November 12	vs. Minneapolis	L 88–126	1–6
8	November 13	@ Boston	L 113–118	1–7
9	November 14	New York	L 93–95	1–8
10	November 16	@ New York	W 110–107	2–8
11	November 19	Fort Wayne	L 92–103	2–9
12	November 20	Milwaukee	W 99–92	3–9
13	November 21	@ Minneapolis	L 85–116	3–10
14	November 25	@ Fort Wayne	L 89–92	3–11

All of these games were retroactively erased from NBA history following the team's folding, with each team's schedule rewritten to have 72 games without these games included.

== Dispersal Draft ==
After the original Baltimore Bullets franchise folded operations on November 27, 1954, the NBA conducted a dispersal draft on the team's players later that day. This stands as the last dispersal draft held by the NBA for one of their own teams folding. However, the NBA would later host the 1976 ABA dispersal draft in August after the NBA-ABA merger two months earlier, but this dispersal draft involved teams from NBA rival league American Basketball Association and therefore no NBA teams.

The following teams acquired these players from the original Bullets franchise during the dispersal draft period:

- Boston Celtics: Bob Houbregs & Eddie Miller
- Fort Wayne Pistons: Al Roges
- Milwaukee Hawks: Frank Selvy
- Minneapolis Lakers: Bobby Leonard
- New York Knicks: Herm Hedderick & Paul Hoffman
- Philadelphia Warriors: Ken Murray
- Rochester Royals: Don Henriksen
- Syracuse Nationals: Connie Simmons
