= 1951–52 Kansas Jayhawks men's basketball team =

American college basketball season

1951–52 Kansas Jayhawks men's basketball
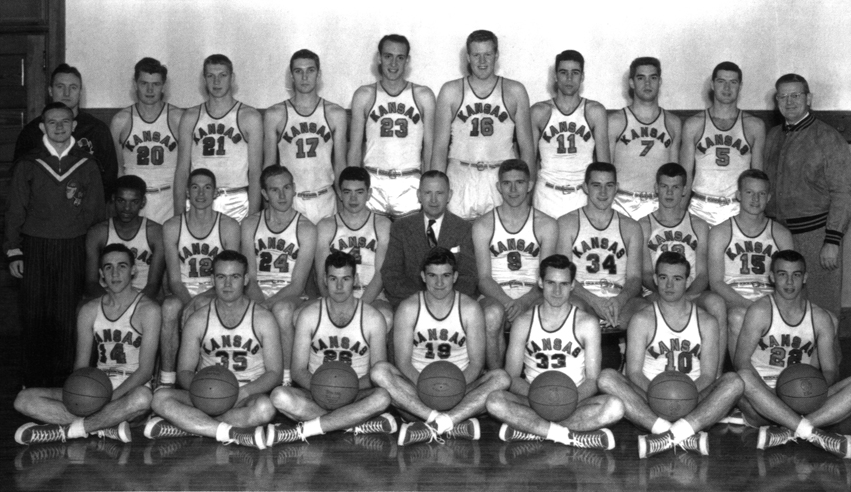

NCAA tournament National champions Big Seven champions

National Championship Game, W 80–63 vs. St. John’s
- Conference: Big Seven Conference

Ranking
- Coaches: No. 3
- AP: No. 8
- Record: 28–3 (11–1 Big 7)
- Head coach: Phog Allen (35th season)
- Assistant coach: Dick Harp (3rd season)
- Captains: Bill Hougland; John Keller; Bob Kenney; Bill Lienhard; Clyde Lovellette
- Home arena: Hoch Auditorium

1951–52 Big Seven Conference men's basketball standings
	Conf.				Overall
Team	W		L	PCT	W		L	PCT
No. 8 Kansas	11	–	1	.917	28	–	3	.903
No. 3 Kansas State	10	–	2	.833	19	–	5	.792
Missouri	6	–	6	.500	14	–	10	.583
Iowa State	4	–	8	.333	10	–	11	.476
Colorado	4	–	8	.333	8	–	16	.333
Oklahoma	4	–	8	.333	7	–	17	.292
Nebraska	3	–	9	.250	7	–	17	.292
Rankings from AP Poll

The 1951–52 Kansas Jayhawks men's basketball team represented the University of Kansas in the 1951–52 NCAA men's basketball season, which was the Jayhawks' 54th. They were led by coach Phog Allen in his 35th season overall, 33rd consecutive. He guided Kansas to its first NCAA Tournament championship, their 3rd National Championship overall, behind center Clyde Lovellette, who scored 33 points and grabbed 17 rebounds in an 80–63 victory over St. John's in the title game. Lovellette became the only player in NCAA history to lead the nation in scoring while leading his team to the national championship in the same season. Also on the team was Dean Smith, who later went on to a Hall of Fame coaching career at North Carolina. Seven members of the team, as well as Allen, would be named to the 1952 United States men's Olympic basketball team.

== Roster ==
1951–52 Kansas Jayhawks men's basketball team
Players
Coaches

Pos.	#	Name	Height	Weight	Year	Hometown
F	3	Jerry Alberts	6 ft 3 in (1.91 m)	186 lb (84 kg)	Fr	Lincoln, Illinois
F/C	25	B. H. Born	6 ft 8 in (2.03 m)	195 lb (88 kg)	So	Medicine Lodge, Kansas
F	4	Larry Davenport	6 ft 2 in (1.88 m)	195 lb (88 kg)	Fr	Newton, Kansas
G/F	12	Everett Dye	6 ft 2 in (1.88 m)	155 lb (70 kg)	So	Independence, Kansas
G/F	21	Bill Heitholt	6 ft 3 in (1.91 m)	178 lb (81 kg)	Fr	Quincy, Illinois
G/F	5	Charlie Hoag	6 ft 2 in (1.88 m)	185 lb (84 kg)	Jr	Oak Park, Illinois
G	17	Bill Hougland	6 ft 4 in (1.93 m)	180 lb (82 kg)	Sr	Beloit, Kansas
G	13	Weston Johnson	6 ft 3 in (1.91 m)	174 lb (79 kg)	So	Newton, Kansas
G/F	20	John Keller	6 ft 3 in (1.91 m)	185 lb (84 kg)	Sr	Page City, Kansas
G	24	Allen Kelley	5 ft 11 in (1.8 m)	164 lb (74 kg)	So	McCune, Kansas
F	14	Dean Kelley	5 ft 11 in (1.8 m)	164 lb (74 kg)	Jr	McCune, Kansas
F	9	Bob Kenney	6 ft 2 in (1.88 m)	195 lb (88 kg)	Sr	Winfield, Kansas
F	11	Bill Lienhard	6 ft 5 in (1.96 m)	180 lb (82 kg)	Sr	Newton, Kansas
C	16	Clyde Lovellette	6 ft 9 in (2.06 m)	230 lb (104 kg)	Sr	Terre Haute, Indiana
F	22	Dean Smith	5 ft 10 in (1.78 m)	160 lb (73 kg)	Jr	Topeka, Kansas

Head coach

- Phog Allen

Assistant coach(es)

- Dick Harp

Legend

- (C) Team captain
- (S) Suspended
- (I) Ineligible
- (W) Walk-on
- Injured
- Current redshirt

== Schedule ==
Date time, TV	Rank^{#}	Opponent^{#}	Result	Record	Site city, state
December 3*		Baylor	W 57–46	1-0	Hoch Auditorium; Lawrence, KS
December 8*		Denver	W 84–53	2-0	Hoch Auditorium; Lawrence, KS
December 10*	No. 8	Creighton	W 65–47	3-0	Vinardi Center; Omaha, NE
December 14*	No. 8	at SMU	W 74–51	4-0	Perkins Gym; Dallas, TX
December 15*	No. 8	at SMU	W 58–57	5-0	Perkins Gym; Dallas, TX
December 18	No. 7	vs. Rice	W 68–48	6-0	Hoch Auditorium; Lawrence, KS
December 22*	No. 7	USC	W 76–55	7-0	Hoch Auditorium; Lawrence, KS
December 26	No. 4	vs. Colorado	W 76–56	8-0	Municipal Auditorium; Kansas City, MO
December 28	No. 4	vs. No. 8 Kansas State; Sunflower Showdown	W 90–88	9-0	Memorial Auditorium; Kansas City, MO
December 29	No. 4	vs. Missouri; Border War	W 75–65	10-0	Memorial Auditorium; Kansas City, MO
January 5	No. 1	Oklahoma	W 71–48	11-0 (1-0)	Hoch Auditorium; Lawrence, KS
January 12	No. 1	at Missouri; Border War	W 60–59	12-0 (2-0)	Brewer Fieldhouse; Columbia, MO
January 14	No. 1	at Nebraska	W 69–66	13-0 (3-0)	Nebraska Coliseum; Lincoln, NE
January 26	No. 2	at No. 7 Kansas State; Sunflower Showdown	L 64–81	13-1 (3-1)	Ahearn Field House; Manhattan, KS
January 30*	No. 4	at Oklahoma A&M	L 45–49	13-2	Gallagher-Iba Arena; Stillwater, OK
February 2	No. 4	Iowa State	W 86–68	14-2 (4-1)	Hoch Auditorium; Lawrence, KS
February 4	No. 4	Colorado	W 73–68	15-2 (5-1)	Hoch Auditorium; Lawrence, KS
February 11	No. 6	at Iowa State	W 55–50	16-2 (6-1)	The Armory; Ames, IA
February 16	No. 9	Nebraska	W 90–52	17-2 (7-1)	Hoch Auditorium; Lawrence, KS
February 19*	No. 7	Oklahoma A&M	W 66–46	18-2	Hoch Auditorium; Lawrence, KS
February 25	No. 9	Missouri; Border War	W 65–54	19-2 (8-1)	Hoch Auditoriium; Lawrence, KS
March 1	No. 8	at Oklahoma	W 74–55	20-2 (9-1)	Field House; Norman, OK
March 7	No. 8	No. 3 Kansas State; Sunflower Showdown	W 78–61	21-2 (10-1)	Hoch Auditorium; Lawrence, KS
March 10	No. 8	at Colorado	W 72–55	22-2 (11-1)	Balch Fieldhouse; Boulder, CO
March 21*	No. 8	vs. TCU; NCAA regional semifinals	W 68–64	23-2	Municipal Auditorium; Kansas City, MO
March 22*	No. 8	vs. No. 5 Saint Louis; NCAA Regional Finals	W 74–55	24-2	Municipal Auditorium; Kansas City, MO
March 25*	No. 8	vs. Santa Clara; NCAA National Semifinals	W 74–55	25-2	Hec Edmundson Pavilion; Seattle, WA
March 26*	No. 8	vs. No. 10 St. John's; National Championship	W 80–63	26-2	Hec Edmundson Pavilion; Seattle, WA
March 30*	No. 8	vs. Southwest Missouri State; Olympic Trials collegiate semi-final	W 92–65	27-2	Municipal Auditorium; Kansas City, MO
March 31*	No. 8	vs. La Salle; Olympic Trials collegiate final	W 70–65	28-2	Madison Square Garden (III); New York, NY
April 1*	No. 8	vs. Peoria; Olympic Trials final	L 60–62	28-3	Madison Square Garden (III); New York, NY
*Non-conference game. ^{#}Rankings from AP Poll. (#) Tournament seedings in parentheses.

== Awards and honors ==
- Clyde Lovellette, NCAA Men's MOP Award

== Team players drafted into the NBA ==
Round	Pick	Player	NBA club
1	9	Clyde Lovellette	Minneapolis Lakers
