= Bobby Watson (basketball player) =

American basketball player

Personal information
- Born: March 22, 1930 Central City, Kentucky, U.S.
- Died: January 31, 2017 (aged 86)
- Listed height: 6 ft 0 in (1.83 m)
- Listed weight: 160 lb (73 kg)

Career information
- High school: Owensboro (Owensboro, Kentucky)
- College: Kentucky (1949–1952)
- NBA draft: 1952: 3rd round, 21st overall pick
- Drafted by: Milwaukee Hawks
- Playing career: 1954–1955
- Position: Point guard
- Number: 12

Career history
- 1954–1955: Minneapolis Lakers
- 1955: Milwaukee Hawks

Career highlights
- NCAA champion (1951); 2× First-team All-SEC (1951, 1952)

Career NBA statistics
- Points: 175 (2.8 ppg)
- Rebound: 87 (1.4 rpg)
- Assists: 79 (1.3 apg)
- Stats at Basketball Reference

Robert E. Watson (March 22, 1930 – January 31, 2017) was a guard who played in the National Basketball Association (NBA). Watson was drafted by the Milwaukee Hawks in the 1952 NBA draft. He first played in the NBA with the Minneapolis Lakers in 1954 before being traded back to the Milwaukee Hawks for Lew Hitch.

He died on January 31, 2017, at the age of 86.

== Career statistics ==
Legend
GP	Games played	GS	Games started	MPG	Minutes per game
FG%	Field goal percentage	3P%	3-point field goal percentage	FT%	Free throw percentage
RPG	Rebounds per game	APG	Assists per game	SPG	Steals per game
BPG	Blocks per game	PPG	Points per game	**Bold**	Career high

=== NBA ===
==== Regular season ====
Year	Team	GP	MPG	FG%	FT%	RPG	APG	PPG
1954–55	Minneapolis	**50**	10.9	**.358**	.629	1.3	1.2	**2.9**
1954–55	Milwaukee	13	**12.0**	.200	**.900**	**1.8**	**1.3**	2.2
Career		63	11.1	.323	.689	1.4	1.3	2.8
