= 1951–52 St. John's Redmen basketball team =

American college basketball season

1951–52 St. John's Redmen men's basketball

NCAA tournament, Runner-up MNYC Champions

National Championship Game, L 63-80 vs. Kansas
- Conference: Metropolitan New York Conference

Ranking
- Coaches: No. 9
- AP: No. 10
- Record: 25–6 (6–0 Metropolitan New York Conference)
- Head coach: Frank McGuire
- Assistant coach: Dusty DeStefano
- Home arena: DeGray Gymnasium; Madison Square Garden

1951–52 Metropolitan New York Conference men's basketball standings
	Conf.				Overall
Team	W		L	PCT	W		L	PCT
No. 10 St. John's	6	–	0	1.000	25	–	6	.806
St. Francis (NY)	4	–	2	.667	20	–	8	.714
Manhattan	4	–	2	.667	12	–	9	.571
Fordham	3	–	3	.500	20	–	8	.714
NYU	2	–	3	.400	17	–	8	.680
CCNY	1	–	5	.167	8	–	11	.421
Brooklyn	0	–	5	.000	9	–	7	.563
Rankings from AP Poll

The 1951–52 St. John's Redmen basketball team represented St. John's University during the 1951–52 NCAA men's basketball season. The team was coached by Frank McGuire in his fifth year at the school. St. John's home games are played at DeGray Gymnasium in Brooklyn, New York, and Madison Square Garden in New York City, and the team is a member of the Metropolitan New York Conference.

== Roster ==
#	Name	Height	Position	Class	Hometown	Previous School(s)
	Dick Duckett	6'0"	G	So.	Brooklyn, NY, United States	St. Francis Prep
	Frank Giancontieri	5'10"	G	Jr.	Brooklyn, NY, United States	Bishop Loughlin HS
	Phil Sagona	6'0"	G	So.	Brooklyn, NY, United States	St. John's Prep
	Jim McMorrow	6'2"	G	So.	Brooklyn, NY, United States	St. Michael HS
	Jim Walsh	6'5"	F	So.	Brooklyn, NY, United States	St. John's Prep
	Carl Peterson	6'6"	F/C	So.	Bridgeport, CT, United States	Bullard-Havens Tech
	Jack McMahon	6'1"	G	Sr.	Brooklyn, NY, United States	St. Michael HS
	Jim "Red" Davis	6'7"	C	So.	Bronx, NY, United States	Manhattan Prep
20	Solly Walker	6'4"	G/F	So.	Brooklyn, NY, United States	Boys HS
21	Ronnie MacGilvray	6'1"	G	Sr.	Floral Park, NY, United States	Sewanhaka HS
30	Bob "Zeke" Zawoluk	6'6"	F/C	Sr.	Brooklyn, NY, United States	St. Francis Prep

== NCAA basketball tournament ==
- East
  - St. John's 60, NC State 49
  - St. John's 64, Kentucky 57
- Final Four
  - St. John's 61, Illinois 59
  - Kansas 80, St. John's 63

== Schedule and results ==
Date time, TV	Rank^{#}	Opponent^{#}	Result	Record	Site city, state
Regular Season
11/08/51*		Arnold College	W 93-33	1-0	DeGray Gymnasium; Brooklyn, NY
12/06/51*		Brigham Young	W 66-52	2-0	Madison Square Garden; New York, NY
12/08/51*		Washington & Jefferson	W 69-52	3-0	Madison Square Garden; New York, NY
12/12/51*	No. 2	Wagner	W 63-47	4-0	Sutter Gymnasium; Staten Island, NY
12/15/51*	No. 2	Rhode Island	W 82-62	5-0	Madison Square Garden; New York, NY
12/17/51*	No. 1	at No. 2 Kentucky	L 40-81	5-1	Memorial Coliseum; Lexington, KY
12/22/51*	No. 1	Vanderbilt	W 69-54	6-1	Madison Square Garden; New York, NY
12/27/51*	No. 7	No. 12 Utah	W 69-57	7-1	Madison Square Garden; New York, NY
12/29/51*	No. 7	Dayton	W 62-60	8-1	Madison Square Garden; New York, NY
01/05/52*	No. 8	Saint Joseph's	W 59-57	9-1	Madison Square Garden; New York, NY
01/10/52*	No. 12	Loyola (IL)	L 64-68	9-2	Madison Square Garden; New York, NY
01/12/52	No. 12	vs. CCNY	W 71-46	10-2 (1-0)	69th Regiment Armory; New York, NY
01/15/52		Manhattan	W 63-53	11-2 (2-0)	Madison Square Garden; New York, NY
01/19/52		vs. St. Francis (NY)	W 54-36	12-2 (3-0)	69th Regiment Armory; New York, NY
01/26/52*	No. 15	at Temple	W 54-44	13-2	Convention Hall; Philadelphia, PA
01/30/52	No. 15	vs. No. 20 Fordham	W 69-56	14-2 (4-0)	69th Regiment Armory; New York, NY
02/02/52*	No. 12	at No. 13 Indiana	W 65-55	15-2	The Fieldhouse; Bloomington, IN
02/04/52*	No. 12	at Purdue	W 64-53	16-2	Lambert Fieldhouse; West Lafayette, IN
02/09/52*	No. 10	at Niagara	W 59-55	17-2	Buffalo Memorial Auditorium; Buffalo, NY
02/14/52*	No. 10	No. 4 St. Bonaventure	W 59-56	18-2	Madison Square Garden; New York, NY
02/19/52*	No. 8	at U.S.M.M.A.	W 87-45	19-2	U.S.M.M.A. Gymnasium; Kings Point, NY
02/21/52*	No. 8	Cincinnati	W 76-64	20-2	Madison Square Garden; New York, NY
02/25/52*	No. 8	No. 17 Holy Cross	L 70-75	20-3	Boston Garden; Boston, MA
02/28/52	No. 9	NYU	W 78-75	21-3 (5-0)	Madison Square Garden; New York, NY
03/04/52	No. 9	Brooklyn College	W 64-51	22-3 (6-0)	DeGray Gymnasium; Brooklyn, NY
National Invitation Tournament
03/10/52*	No. 10	vs. La Salle; NIT Quarterfinal	L 45-51	22-4	Madison Square Garden; New York, NY
NCAA tournament
03/21/52*	No. 10	vs. NC State; East Regional First Round	W 60-49	23-4	Reynolds Coliseum; Raleigh, NC
03/22/52*	No. 10	vs. No. 1 Kentucky; East Regional Second Round	W 64-57	24-4	Reynolds Coliseum; Raleigh, NC
03/25/52*	No. 10	vs. No. 2 Illinois; National Semifinal	W 61-59	25-4	Edmundson Pavilion; Seattle, WA
03/26/52*	No. 10	vs. No. 8 Kansas; National Championship	L 63-80	25-5	Edmundson Pavilion; Seattle, WA
Olympic Trials
03/29/52*	No. 10	vs. La Salle; Olympic Trials collegiate semi-final	L 62-71	25-6	Madison Square Garden; New York, NY
*Non-conference game. ^{#}Rankings from AP Poll. (#) Tournament seedings in parentheses.

== NBA draft ==
Year	Round	Pick	Player	NBA club
1952	2	14	Bob Zawoluk	Indianapolis Olympians
1952	4	38	Ronnie MacGilvray	Rochester Royals
1952	6	58	Jack McMahon	Rochester Royals
1954	6	52	Red Davis	Rochester Royals
1954	7	62	Solly Walker	New York Knicks
1957	2	9	Dick Duckett	Cincinnati Royals
