= List of 1953–54 NBA season transactions =

This is a list of all personnel changes for the 1953 NBA off-season and 1953–54 NBA season.

== Events ==
=== August 23, 1953 ===
- The Milwaukee Hawks sold Mel Hutchins to the Fort Wayne Pistons.

=== August 27, 1953 ===
- The Baltimore Bullets traded Jim Baechtold to the New York Knicks for Jim Luisi, Max Zaslofsky and Roy Belliveau.

=== September ?, 1953 ===
- The Baltimore Bullets traded Don Barksdale to the Boston Celtics for Herm Hedderick, Mo Mahoney, cash, Jim Doherty and Vernon Stokes.

=== September 25, 1953 ===
- The Rochester Royals released Red Holzman.

=== October 7, 1953 ===
- The Milwaukee Hawks signed Red Holzman as a free agent.

=== October 27, 1953 ===
- The Minneapolis Lakers sold Lew Hitch to the Milwaukee Hawks.

=== November 23, 1953 ===
- The Milwaukee Hawks traded Bob Lavoy to the Syracuse Nationals for Noble Jorgensen.
- The Milwaukee Hawks signed Bob Peterson as a free agent.

=== November 25, 1953 ===
- The Baltimore Bullets traded Max Zaslofsky to the Milwaukee Hawks for Bob Houbregs.

=== November 29, 1953 ===
- The Milwaukee Hawks traded Jack Nichols to the Boston Celtics for Fred Eydt, J.C. Maze, John Azary, Paul Unruh and Tom Lillis.

=== December 21, 1953 ===
- The Milwaukee Hawks traded Max Zaslofsky to the Fort Wayne Pistons for Chuck Share.
- The Milwaukee Hawks traded Lew Hitch to the Minneapolis Lakers for Bobby Watson.

=== December 29, 1953 ===
- The Fort Wayne Pistons sold Fred Schaus to the New York Knicks.

=== January ?, 1954 ===
- The Milwaukee Hawks signed Dick Surhoff as a free agent.

=== February 2, 1954 ===
- The Minneapolis Lakers sold Bob Harrison to the Milwaukee Hawks.

=== February 18, 1954 ===
- The Baltimore Bullets traded Leo Barnhorst to the Fort Wayne Pistons for cash.

=== May 28, 1954 ===
- The Boston Celtics sold Chuck Cooper to the Milwaukee Hawks.

== Notes ==
- ^{a} Number of years played in the NBA prior to the draft
- ^{b} Career with the franchise that drafted the player
- ^{c} Never played a game for the franchise
