= Dick Rosenthal =

American basketball player (1933–2024)

Personal information
- Born: January 20, 1933 St. Louis, Missouri, U.S.
- Died: June 11, 2024 (aged 91) Estero, Florida, U.S.
- Listed height: 6 ft 5 in (1.96 m)
- Listed weight: 205 lb (93 kg)

Career information
- High school: McBride (St. Louis, Missouri)
- College: Notre Dame (1951–1954)
- NBA draft: 1954: 1st round, 4th overall pick
- Drafted by: Fort Wayne Pistons
- Playing career: 1954–1957
- Position: Small forward
- Number: 15

Career history
- 1954–1957: Fort Wayne Pistons

Career highlights
- Second-team All-American – INS (1954)

Career NBA statistics
- Points: 575 (6.8 ppg)
- Rebounds: 352 (4.1 rpg)
- Assists: 170 (2.0 apg)
- Stats at NBA.com
- Stats at Basketball Reference

Richard Anthony Rosenthal (January 20, 1933 – June 11, 2024) was an American basketball player. An National Basketball Association (NBA) forward with the Fort Wayne Pistons, he played collegiate basketball for the Notre Dame Fighting Irish, where he averaged 16.4 points per game over his career. Rosenthal also played baseball at Notre Dame in 1952 and 1953. The Pistons drafted him in the first round of the 1954 NBA draft. He played parts of two seasons for the Pistons, appearing in 85 career games and averaging 6.8 points per game in his NBA career.

Rosenthal became president of St. Joseph Bank and Trust Co. in South Bend, Indiana. In 1987 he succeeded Gene Corrigan as the athletic director of Notre Dame, during which time the 1988 football team won the national championship. Rosenthal retired from the position in 1994, after the university entered the Big East Conference.

Rosenthal was born in St. Louis, Missouri on January 20, 1933. He was married to his first wife, Marylyn, for 41 years. Following her death, he was married to his second wife, Charlotte, for 25 years until his death. He had eight children. He died in Estero, Florida, on June 11, 2024, at age 91.

== Career statistics ==
Legend
GP	Games played	GS	Games started	MPG	Minutes per game
FG%	Field goal percentage	3P%	3-point field goal percentage	FT%	Free throw percentage
RPG	Rebounds per game	APG	Assists per game	SPG	Steals per game
BPG	Blocks per game	PPG	Points per game	**Bold**	Career high
*	Led the league

=== NBA ===
==== Regular season ====
Year	Team	GP	MPG	FG%	FT%	RPG	APG	PPG
1954–55	Fort Wayne	**67**	**21.0**	**.377**	**.718**	**4.5**	**2.3**	**7.8**
1956–57	Fort Wayne	18	10.4	.266	.529	2.9	.9	2.8
Career		85	18.8	.362	.702	4.1	2.0	6.8

==== Playoffs ====
Year	Team	GP	MPG	FG%	FT%	RPG	APG	PPG
1955	Fort Wayne	11*	19.0	.321	.718	4.4	2.4	7.5
