= Boris Nachamkin =

American basketball player

Personal information
- Born: December 6, 1933 Brooklyn, New York, U.S.
- Died: February 14, 2018 (aged 84) Millbrook, New York, U.S.
- Listed height: 6 ft 6 in (1.98 m)
- Listed weight: 210 lb (95 kg)

Career information
- High school: Thomas Jefferson (Brooklyn, New York)
- College: NYU (1951–1954)
- NBA draft: 1954: 2nd round, 16th overall pick
- Drafted by: Rochester Royals
- Playing career: 1954–1963
- Position: Small forward
- Number: 17

Career history
- 1954: Rochester Royals
- 1954–1959: Carbondale Celtics / Scranton Miners
- 1960–1963: Wilkes-Barre Barons

Career highlights
- EPBL champion (1957)

Career NBA statistics
- Points: 20 (3.3 ppg)
- Rebounds: 19 (3.2 rpg)
- Assists: 3 (0.5 apg)
- Stats at NBA.com
- Stats at Basketball Reference

Boris Alexander Nachamkin (December 6, 1933 – February 14, 2018) was a Russian-American professional basketball player.

Nachamkin was born in Brooklyn, New York, the son of Russian immigrants, and was Jewish. He played basketball for Thomas Jefferson High School. He then played college basketball for the New York University Violets men's basketball team.

He played in the 1953 Maccabiah Games in Israel, winning a gold medal with the US team.

Nachamkin was selected in the 1954 NBA draft (second round, 16th overall) by the Rochester Royals. He played for the Royals in 1954 as a forward and averaged 3.3 points, 3.2 rebounds and 0.5 assists per contest in six career games.

Boris was drafted by the U.S. Army, which subsequently cut his NBA career short. After his discharge from the service, he had a 36-year career with Bankers Trust, where he rose to the Head of Global Shipping in London.

Nachamkin played in the Eastern Professional Basketball League (EPBL) for the Carbondale Celtics / Scranton Miners from 1954 to 1959 and Wilkes-Barre Barons from 1960 to 1963. He won an EPBL championship with the Miners in 1957.

== Career statistics ==
Legend
GP	Games played	GS	Games started	MPG	Minutes per game
FG%	Field goal percentage	3P%	3-point field goal percentage	FT%	Free throw percentage
RPG	Rebounds per game	APG	Assists per game	SPG	Steals per game
BPG	Blocks per game	PPG	Points per game	**Bold**	Career high

=== NBA ===
==== Regular season ====
Year	Team	GP	MPG	FG%	FT%	RPG	APG	PPG
1954–55	Rochester	6	9.8	.300	.615	3.2	.5	3.3

== See also ==
- List of select Jewish basketball players
