= Dan King (basketball) =

American basketball player

Personal information
- Born: January 7, 1931 Paris, Tennessee, U.S.
- Died: January 20, 2003 (aged 72) Louisville, Kentucky, U.S.
- Listed height: 6 ft 6 in (1.98 m)
- Listed weight: 220 lb (100 kg)

Career information
- High school: Grove (Paris, Tennessee)
- College: Western Kentucky (1951–1954)
- NBA draft: 1954: undrafted
- Position: Forward
- Number: 22

Career history
- 1954–1955: Baltimore Bullets
- Stats at NBA.com
- Stats at Basketball Reference

Thomas Daniel King (January 7, 1931 – January 20, 2003) was an American professional basketball player. He played a season for the Baltimore Bullets of the National Basketball Association (NBA).

King was a two-sport star at Western Kentucky University, playing both basketball and baseball for the Hilltoppers from 1951 to 1954 and was inducted into the school's athletic Hall of Fame in 2014. Following his college career, King played one season with the NBA's Bullets, scoring 19 total points in 12 games.

After his basketball career ended, King became a high school coach and administrator. He died on January 20, 2003, in Louisville, Kentucky.

== Career statistics ==
Legend
GP	Games played	GS	Games started	MPG	Minutes per game
FG%	Field goal percentage	3P%	3-point field goal percentage	FT%	Free throw percentage
RPG	Rebounds per game	APG	Assists per game	SPG	Steals per game
BPG	Blocks per game	PPG	Points per game	**Bold**	Career high

=== NBA ===
==== Regular season ====
Year	Team	GP	MPG	FG%	FT%	RPG	APG	PPG
1954–55	Baltimore	12	8.6	.318	.500	2.1	.3	1.6
