= Bob Carney =

American basketball player

Personal information
- Born: August 3, 1932 Aurora, Illinois, U.S.
- Died: November 10, 2011 (aged 79) Normal, Illinois, U.S.
- Listed height: 6 ft 3 in (1.91 m)
- Listed weight: 170 lb (77 kg)

Career information
- High school: West Aurora (Aurora, Illinois)
- College: Bradley (1951–1954)
- NBA draft: 1954: 6th round, 47th overall pick
- Drafted by: Milwaukee Hawks
- Position: Shooting guard
- Number: 18

Career history
- 1954–1955: Minneapolis Lakers

Career highlights
- No. 33 retired by Bradley Braves
- Stats at NBA.com
- Stats at Basketball Reference

Robert Lee Carney (August 3, 1932 – November 9, 2011) was an American basketball player.

He played in West Aurora High School and collegiately for Bradley University.

He was selected by the Milwaukee Hawks in the 6th round (47th pick overall) of the 1954 NBA draft.

He played for the Minneapolis Lakers (1954–55) in the NBA for 19 games.

== Career statistics ==
Legend
GP	Games played	GS	Games started	MPG	Minutes per game
FG%	Field goal percentage	3P%	3-point field goal percentage	FT%	Free throw percentage
RPG	Rebounds per game	APG	Assists per game	SPG	Steals per game
BPG	Blocks per game	PPG	Points per game	**Bold**	Career high

=== NBA ===
==== Regular season ====
Year	Team	GP	MPG	FG%	FT%	RPG	APG	PPG
1954–55	Minneapolis	19	12.8	.375	.525	2.4	.8	3.6

==== Playoffs ====
Year	Team	GP	MPG	FG%	FT%	RPG	APG	PPG
1955	Minneapolis	7	5.9	.125	.889	.7	.4	1.4
