= 1952 NCAA basketball championship game =

1952 NCAA Tournament Championship Game
National championship game
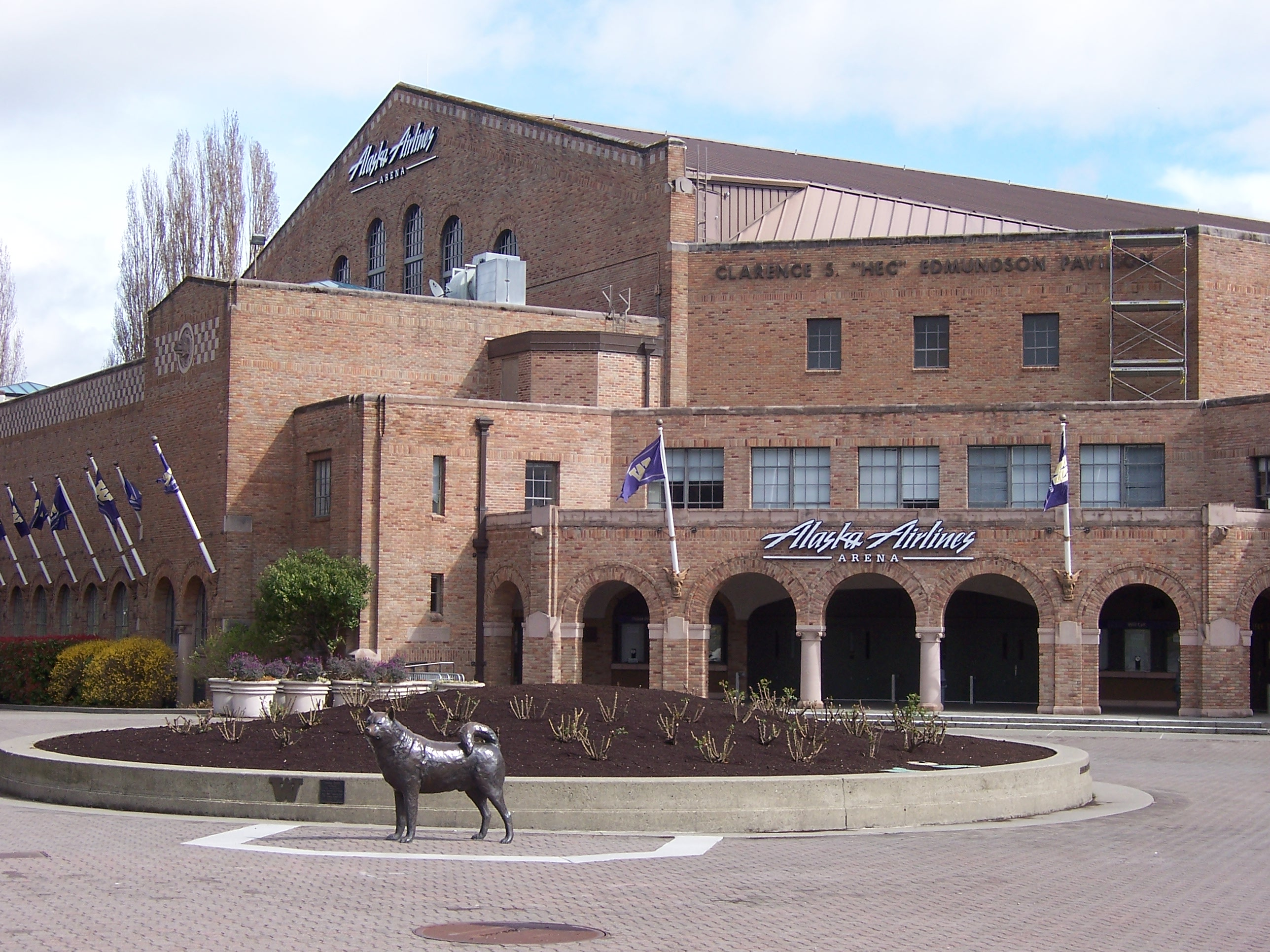
- The Hec Edmundson Pavilion in Seattle, Washington, hosted the championship game.
St. John's Redmen	Kansas Jayhawks
MNYC	Big Seven
(25-5)	(27-3)
63	80
Head coach: Frank McGuire	Head coach: Phog Allen
- AP: 10
- Coaches: 9
- AP: 8
- Coaches: 3
	1st half	2nd half	Total
St. John's Redmen	27	36	63
Kansas Jayhawks	41	39	80
- Date: March 26, 1952
- Venue: Hec Edmundson Pavilion, Seattle, Washington
- MVP: Clyde Lovellette, Kansas

The 1952 NCAA University Division Basketball Championship Game was the finals of the 1952 NCAA basketball tournament and it determined the national champion for the 1951-52 NCAA men's basketball season. The game was played on March 26, 1952, at Hec Edmundson Pavilion in Seattle, Washington. It featured the St. John's Redmen of the Metropolitan New York Conference, and the Kansas Jayhawks of the Big Seven Conference.

== Participating teams ==
=== St. John's Redmen ===
- East
  - St. John's 60, NC State 49
  - St. John's 64, Kentucky 57
- Final Four
  - St. John's 61, Illinois 59

=== Kansas Jayhawks ===
- West
  - Kansas 68, TCU 64
  - Kansas 74, Saint Louis 55
- Final Four
  - Kansas 74, Santa Clara 55

== Game summary ==
March 26, 1952

#8 Kansas Jayhawks 80, #10 St. John's Redmen 63
Scoring by half: 41-27, 39-36
Pts: Clyde Lovellette 33; Rebs: Clyde Lovellette 17	Pts: Zeke Zawoluk 20; Rebs: Ronnie MacGilvray 10

Hec Edmundson Pavilion, Seattle, Washington
