= Ken McBride (basketball) =

American basketball player

Personal information
- Born: March 23, 1929 Centralia, Illinois, U.S.
- Died: May 14, 2005 (aged 76)
- Listed height: 6 ft 3 in (1.91 m)
- Listed weight: 190 lb (86 kg)

Career information
- High school: Centralia (Centralia, Illinois)
- College: Maryland Eastern Shore (1948–1952)
- NBA draft: 1952: 5th round, 47th overall pick
- Drafted by: Syracuse Nationals
- Playing career: 1954–1955
- Position: Shooting guard
- Number: 4

Career history
- 1954–1955: Milwaukee Hawks

Career NBA statistics
- Points: 117 (9.8 ppg)
- Rebounds: 31 (2.6 rpg)
- Assists: 14 (1.2 apg)
- Stats at NBA.com
- Stats at Basketball Reference

Kenneth Stanford McBride (March 23, 1929 – May 14, 2005) was an American professional basketball player. McBride was selected in the 1952 NBA draft by the Syracuse Nationals after a collegiate career at Maryland State. He played for the Milwaukee Hawks in 12 games during the 1954–55 season.

== Career statistics ==
Legend
| GP | Games played | GS | Games started | MPG | Minutes per game |
| FG% | Field goal percentage | 3P% | 3-point field goal percentage | FT% | Free throw percentage |
| RPG | Rebounds per game | APG | Assists per game | SPG | Steals per game |
| BPG | Blocks per game | PPG | Points per game | **Bold** | Career high |

=== NBA ===
==== Regular season ====
| Year | Team | GP | MPG | FG% | FT% | RPG | APG | PPG |
|---|---|---|---|---|---|---|---|---|
| 1954–55 | Milwaukee | 12 | 20.8 | .327 | .724 | 2.6 | 1.2 | 9.8 |
