= 1951–52 Iowa State Cyclones men's basketball team =

American college basketball season

1951–52 Iowa State Cyclones men's basketball
- Conference: Big Seven Conference
- Record: 10–11 (4–8 Big Seven)
- Head coach: Clay Sutherland (5th season)
- Home arena: Iowa State Armory

1951–52 Big Seven Conference men's basketball standings
	Conf.				Overall
Team	W		L	PCT	W		L	PCT
No. 8 Kansas	11	–	1	.917	28	–	3	.903
No. 3 Kansas State	10	–	2	.833	19	–	5	.792
Missouri	6	–	6	.500	14	–	10	.583
Iowa State	4	–	8	.333	10	–	11	.476
Colorado	4	–	8	.333	8	–	16	.333
Oklahoma	4	–	8	.333	7	–	17	.292
Nebraska	3	–	9	.250	7	–	17	.292
Rankings from AP Poll

The 1951–52 Iowa State Cyclones men's basketball team represented Iowa State University during the 1951–52 NCAA men's basketball season. The Cyclones were coached by Clay Sutherland, who was in his fifth season with the Cyclones. They played their home games at the Iowa State Armory in Ames, Iowa.

They finished the season 10–11, 4–8 in Big Seven play to finish in a tie for fourth place.

The February 11 home game against Kansas marked the first ever live telecast of an Iowa State basketball home game. WOI-TV broadcast the game in central Iowa.

== Roster ==
1951–52 Iowa State Cyclones men's basketball team
Players
Coaches

Pos.	#	Name	Height	Weight	Year	Hometown
F		Barney Alleman	6 ft 2 in (1.88 m)	—	Fr	Ankeny, Iowa
G		Virg Byerly	5 ft 10 in (1.78 m)	—		Boone, Iowa
F		Jerry Davis	6 ft 0 in (1.83 m)	—		Ottumwa, Iowa
C		Delmar Diercks	6 ft 8 in (2.03 m)	—		Mason City, Iowa
C		Chuck Duncan	6 ft 5 in (1.96 m)	—	Fr	Atlantic, Iowa
F		Howie Franks	6 ft 3 in (1.91 m)	—		Fort Dodge, Iowa
F		George Hess	5 ft 9 in (1.75 m)	—
F		Howie Johnson	6 ft 3 in (1.91 m)	—		Shenandoah, Iowa
F		Paul Koch	6 ft 4 in (1.93 m)	—
G		Sam Long	5 ft 11 in (1.8 m)	—		Ottumwa, Iowa
G		Jack Luhrig	6 ft 3 in (1.91 m)	—
F		Clare Russie	6 ft 5 in (1.96 m)	—		Marshalltown, Iowa
F		Jim Stange (C)	6 ft 7 in (2.01 m)	—
G		Carl VanCleave	6 ft 3 in (1.91 m)	—		Montezuma, Iowa
G		Dan Youngblade	6 ft 3 in (1.91 m)	—

Head coach

- Clay Sutherland

Assistant coach(es)

Legend

- (C) Team captain
- (S) Suspended
- (I) Ineligible
- (W) Walk-on
- Injured
- Current redshirt

== Schedule and results ==
Date time, TV	Rank^{#}	Opponent^{#}	Result	Record	Site city, state
Regular season
December 1, 1951*; 7:30 pm		South Dakota	W 54–50	1–0	Iowa State Armory; Ames, Iowa
December 3, 1951*; 7:30 pm		at Morningside	W 65–63	2–0	Allee Gymnasium; Sioux City, Iowa
December 7, 1951*; 7:30 pm		at Creighton	W 57–49	3–0	University Gym; Omaha, Nebraska
December 10, 1951*; 7:30 pm		Drake; Iowa Big Four	W 51–46	4–0	Iowa State Armory; Ames, Iowa
December 22, 1951*; 8:15 pm		at Drake; Iowa Big Four	L 57–68	4–1	Drake Fieldhouse; Des Moines, Iowa
December 27, 1951*; 9:45 pm		vs. Missouri; Big Seven Holiday Tournament Quarterfinals	L 42–49	4–2	Municipal Auditorium; Kansas City, Missouri
December 28, 1951*; 4:00 pm		vs. No. 13 Stanford; Big Seven Holiday Tournament Consolation Semifinals	L 102–103	4–3	Municipal Auditorium; Kansas City, Missouri
December 29, 1951*; 2:00 pm		vs. Nebraska; Big Seven Holiday Tournament Seventh Place	W 75–66	5–3	Municipal Auditorium; Kansas City, Missouri
January 5, 1952; 7:30 pm		Missouri	W 57–55	6–3 (1–0)	Iowa State Armory; Ames, Iowa
January 12, 1952; 9:00 pm		at Colorado	L 52–67	6–4 (1–1)	Balch Fieldhouse; Boulder, Colorado
January 19, 1952; 7:30 pm		at No. 9 Kansas State	L 58–76	6–5 (1–2)	Ahearn Fieldhouse; Manhattan, Kansas
January 28, 1952; 7:30 pm		Nebraska	W 78–72	7–5 (2–2)	Iowa State Armory; Ames, Iowa
February 2, 1952; 8:00 pm		at No. 4 Kansas	L 68–86	7–6 (2–3)	Hoch Auditorium; Lawrence, Kansas
February 4, 1952; 7:30 pm		at Oklahoma	L 45–49	7–7 (2–4)	OU Field House; Norman, Oklahoma
February 11, 1952; 7:20 pm, WOI		No. 6 Kansas	L 50–55	7–8 (2–5)	Iowa State Armory; Ames, Iowa
February 16, 1952*; 7:30 pm		Creighton	W 59–58 ^{OT}	8–8	Iowa State Armory; Ames, Iowa
February 23, 1952; 7:30 pm, WOI		Oklahoma	W 59–48	9–8 (3–5)	Iowa State Armory; Ames, Iowa
February 25, 1952; 8:00 pm		at Nebraska	L 53–75	9–9 (3–6)	Nebraska Coliseum; Lincoln, Nebraska
February 29, 1952		at Missouri	L 49–53	9–10 (3–7)	Brewer Fieldhouse; Columbia, Missouri
March 3, 1952; 7:30 pm		No. 3 Kansas State	L 66–88	9–11 (3–8)	Iowa State Armory; Ames, Iowa
March 8, 1952; 7:30 pm		Colorado	W 69–62	10–11 (4–8)	Iowa State Armory; Ames, Iowa
*Non-conference game. ^{#}Rankings from AP poll. (#) Tournament seedings in parentheses. All times are in Central Time.
