= McCoy Ingram =

American basketball player

Personal information
- Born: August 21, 1931
- Died: June 8, 1998 (aged 66) Gulfport, Mississippi
- Listed height: 6 ft 8 in (2.03 m)
- Listed weight: 210 lb (95 kg)

Career information
- High school: Thirty-Third Avenue (Gulfport, Mississippi)
- College: Jackson State (1950–1954)
- NBA draft: 1954: undrafted
- Position: Power forward
- Number: 22

Career history
- 1957–1958: Minneapolis Lakers
- Stats at NBA.com
- Stats at Basketball Reference

Joel McCoy Ingram (August 21, 1931 – June 8, 1998) was an American professional basketball power forward who played one season in the National Basketball Association (NBA) as a member of the Minneapolis Lakers during the 1957–58 season. He was also a one-time member of the Harlem Globetrotters.

He was a 1954 graduate of Jackson State College (now Jackson State University).

In 1956, he was one of 56 players invited to tryout for the 1956 United States men's Olympic basketball team. Of the six Black players that tried out, he was the only one from a historically Black college.

Ingram died on June 8, 1998, in Gulfport, Mississippi, at age 67.

== Career statistics ==
Legend
GP	Games played	GS	Games started	MPG	Minutes per game
FG%	Field goal percentage	3P%	3-point field goal percentage	FT%	Free throw percentage
RPG	Rebounds per game	APG	Assists per game	SPG	Steals per game
BPG	Blocks per game	PPG	Points per game	**Bold**	Career high

=== NBA ===
==== Regular season ====
Year	Team	GP	MPG	FG%	FT%	RPG	APG	PPG
1957–58	Minneapolis	24	11.1	.262	.464	4.8	.8	2.8
