= Arnold Short =

American basketball player (1932–2014)

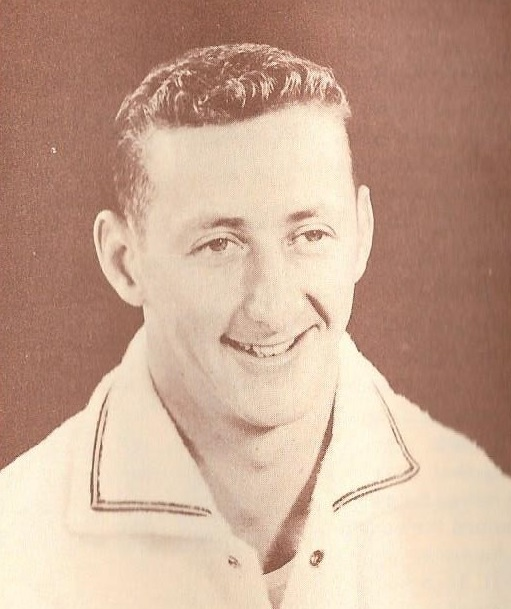
- Short with the Phillips 66ers.

Personal information
- Born: October 3, 1932 Weatherford, Oklahoma, U.S.
- Died: September 26, 2014 (aged 81) Oklahoma City, Oklahoma, U.S.
- Listed height: 6 ft 3 in (1.91 m)
- Listed weight: 170 lb (77 kg)

Career information
- High school: Weatherford (Weatherford, Oklahoma)
- College: Oklahoma City (1951–1954)
- NBA draft: 1954: 2nd round, 13th overall pick
- Drafted by: Fort Wayne Pistons
- Position: Guard
- Number: 33

Career history
- 1954–1959: Phillips 66ers

Career highlights
- AAU All-American (1955); AAU champion (1955); Second-team All-American – Look, NEA, Collier's (1954); Third-team All-American – AP, UPI (1954)
- Stats at Basketball Reference

Arnold Short (October 3, 1932 – September 26, 2014) was an American basketball player. A 6 ft 3 in (1.91 m) guard, he was an All-American college player at Oklahoma City University and a second round pick in the 1954 NBA draft.

Short came to Oklahoma City from Weatherford High School in Weatherford, Oklahoma. There he became the first basketball All-American in school history. As a senior in 1953–54, Short averaged 27.8 points per game, finishing fourth in the NCAA scoring race. As a collegian, Short also played baseball and tennis.

Following his college career, Short was drafted in the second round of the 1954 NBA draft by the Fort Wayne Pistons (13th overall). However, he chose to play for the Phillips 66ers in the Amateur Athletic Union (AAU) instead. There he was an AAU All-American in 1955 as the 66ers won the AAU title.

After retiring from basketball Short became head tennis coach and an assistant basketball coach at Oklahoma City University. He also served as the school's athletic director.
