= John Keller (basketball) =

American basketball player

Personal information
- Born: November 10, 1928; Page City, Kansas, U.S.
- Died: October 6, 2000 (aged 71); Great Bend, Kansas, U.S.
- Listed height: 6 ft 3 in (1.91 m)
- Listed weight: 185 lb (84 kg)

Career information
- High school: Page City (Page City, Kansas)
- College: Garden City CC (1948–1950); Kansas (1950–1952)
- NBA draft: 1952: undrafted
Medals
Men's basketball
Representing the United States
Olympic Games
Gold medal – first place	1952 Helsinki	Team competition

John Frederick Keller (November 10, 1928 – October 6, 2000) was an American basketball player who competed in the 1952 Summer Olympics. He competed in three games as a member of the American basketball team, which won the gold medal.

He died in 2000 in Great Bend, Kansas where he had lived since 1952.
