= Bo Erias =

American basketball player

Personal information
- Born: July 30, 1932 Queens, New York, U.S.
- Died: January 25, 2007 (aged 74) Niagara Falls, New York, U.S.
- Listed height: 6 ft 3 in (1.91 m)
- Listed weight: 220 lb (100 kg)

Career information
- High school: Automotive (Brooklyn, New York)
- College: Niagara (1950–1954)
- NBA draft: 1954: 5th round, 43rd overall pick
- Drafted by: Rochester Royals
- Position: Small forward
- Number: 3

Career history
- 1958: Minneapolis Lakers
- Stats at NBA.com
- Stats at Basketball Reference

Baltico S. "Bo" Erias (July 30, 1932 – January 25, 2007) was an American professional basketball player. Erias was selected in the 1954 NBA draft by the Rochester Royals after a collegiate career at Niagara. He played for the Minneapolis Lakers in 1958 and averaged 8.2 points, 4.6 rebounds and 1.4 assists per contest in 18 career games.

== Career statistics ==
Legend
GP	Games played	GS	Games started	MPG	Minutes per game
FG%	Field goal percentage	3P%	3-point field goal percentage	FT%	Free throw percentage
RPG	Rebounds per game	APG	Assists per game	SPG	Steals per game
BPG	Blocks per game	PPG	Points per game	**Bold**	Career high

=== NBA ===
==== Regular season ====
Year	Team	GP	MPG	FG%	FT%	RPG	APG	PPG
1957–58	Minneapolis	18	22.3	.347	.638	4.6	1.4	8.2
