= Ronnie MacGilvray =

American basketball player (1930–2007)

Personal information
- Born: July 20, 1930 Poughkeepsie, New York, U.S.
- Died: February 11, 2007 (aged 76)
- Listed height: 6 ft 2 in (1.88 m)
- Listed weight: 185 lb (84 kg)

Career information
- High school: Sewanhaka (Floral Park, New York)
- College: St. John's (1949–1952)
- NBA draft: 1952: 4th round, 38th overall pick
- Drafted by: Rochester Royals
- Playing career: 1954–1957
- Position: Guard
- Number: 8

Career history
- 1954: Milwaukee Hawks
- 1954–1955: Wilkes-Barre Barons
- 1956–1957: Hazleton Pros

Career highlights
- EPBL champion (1955); Haggerty Award winner (1952)

Career statistics
- Points: 8 (1.3 ppg)
- Rebounds: 9 (1.5 rpg)
- Assists: 11 (1.8 apg)
- Stats at NBA.com
- Stats at Basketball Reference

Ronald Gordon MacGilvray (July 20, 1930 - February 11, 2007) was an American professional basketball player. He played in the National Basketball Association (NBA) for the Milwaukee Hawks in 1954–55. He played collegiately at St. John's and was selected in the 1952 NBA draft by the Rochester Royals.

As a senior in 1951–52, MacGilvray was selected as the Haggerty Award winner, given annually since 1935–36 to the best men's college basketball player in the New York City metropolitan area. He was the seventh winner from St. John's in the award's short history.

In the NBA, he played only one season. As a member of the Milwaukee Hawks, MacGilvray averaged 1.3 points, 1.5 rebounds and 1.8 assists per game in six games played.

MacGilvray played in the Eastern Professional Basketball League (EPBL) for the Wilkes-Barre Barons during the 1954–55 season and Hazleton Pros during the 1956–57 season. He won an EPBL championship with the Barons in 1955.

== Career statistics ==
Legend
GP	Games played	GS	Games started	MPG	Minutes per game
FG%	Field goal percentage	3P%	3-point field goal percentage	FT%	Free throw percentage
RPG	Rebounds per game	APG	Assists per game	SPG	Steals per game
BPG	Blocks per game	PPG	Points per game	**Bold**	Career high

=== NBA ===
==== Regular season ====
Year	Team	GP	MPG	FG%	FT%	RPG	APG	PPG
1954–55	Milwaukee	6	9.5	.167	.571	1.5	1.8	1.3
