= Charlie Hoag =

American basketball player (1931–2012)

Personal information
- Born: July 19, 1931 Guthrie, Oklahoma, U.S.
- Died: March 8, 2012 (aged 80) Kansas City, Missouri, U.S.
- Listed height: 6 ft 3 in (1.91 m)
- Listed weight: 195 lb (88 kg)

Career information
- High school: Oak Park and River Forest (Oak Park, Illinois)
- College: Kansas (1950–1952)

Career highlights
- NCAA champion (1952)
Medals
Men's basketball
Representing the United States
Olympic Games
Gold medal – first place	1952 Helsinki	Team competition

Charles Monroe Hoag (July 19, 1931 – March 8, 2012) was an American basketball player who competed in the 1952 Summer Olympics. Hoag was also an important player on the University of Kansas 1952 National Championship basketball team. He starred on the KU football team and baseball team while at KU as well.

He was drafted in the 1953 NFL draft in the 26th round by the Cleveland Browns as the 311th overall pick, but he did not play professional sports because of a career ending serious knee injury he suffered in the 1953 KU versus KSU football game.

He was part of the U.S. men's national basketball team, which won the gold medal. He played seven matches.
