= Bill Lienhard =

American basketball player (1930–2022)

Personal information
- Born: January 14, 1930 Slaton, Texas, U.S.
- Died: February 8, 2022 (aged 92) Lawrence, Kansas, U.S.
- Listed height: 6 ft 5 in (1.96 m)
- Listed weight: 180 lb (82 kg)

Career information
- High school: Newton (Newton, Kansas)
- College: Kansas (1949–1952)
- NBA draft: 1952: undrafted
- Position: Forward

Career highlights
- NCAA champion (1952)
Medals
Men's basketball
Representing the United States
Olympic Games
| Gold medal – first place | 1952 Helsinki | Team competition |

William Barner Lienhard (January 14, 1930 – February 8, 2022) was an American basketball player who competed in the 1952 Summer Olympics.

Lienhard was born in Slaton, Texas. He went to college at the University of Kansas, where he was a member of the 1952 NCAA Champion basketball team. He was then part of the American Olympic basketball team, which won the gold medal. He played a total of five matches during the Summer Games in Helsinki. After the Olympics, he joined the Air Force, where he continued to play basketball. Upon leaving the Air Force, he retired from the sport and lived as a banker in Kansas. Lienhard died on February 8, 2022, at the age of 92.
