= Lew Hitch =

American basketball player (1929–2012)

Personal information
- Born: July 16, 1929 Griggsville, Illinois, U.S.
- Died: February 8, 2012 (aged 82)
- Listed height: 6 ft 8 in (2.03 m)
- Listed weight: 200 lb (91 kg)

Career information
- High school: Griggsville-Perry (Griggsville, Illinois)
- College: Culver–Stockton (1947–1948); Kansas State (1949–1951)
- NBA draft: 1951: 2nd round, 19th overall pick
- Drafted by: Minneapolis Lakers
- Playing career: 1951–1957
- Position: Power forward / center
- Number: 11, 12, 15, 14

Career history
- 1951–1953: Minneapolis Lakers
- 1953–1954: Milwaukee Hawks
- 1954–1957: Minneapolis Lakers
- 1957: Philadelphia Warriors

Career highlights
- 2× NBA champion (1952, 1953)

Career NBA statistics
- Points: 2,075 (5.0 ppg)
- Rebounds: 2,183 (5.3 rpg)
- Assists: 499 (1.2 apg)
- Stats at NBA.com
- Stats at Basketball Reference

Lewis Rufus Hitch (July 16, 1929 – February 8, 2012) was an American professional basketball player. He was born in Griggsville, Illinois.

A 6'8" forward/center from Kansas State University, Hitch played six seasons (1951–1957) in the National Basketball Association as a member of the Minneapolis Lakers, Milwaukee Hawks, and Philadelphia Warriors. He averaged 5.0 points per game in his career and won the 1952 and 1953 championships with the Lakers.

He died on February 8, 2012, after an extended illness.

== Career statistics ==
Legend
GP	Games played	GS	Games started	MPG	Minutes per game
FG%	Field goal percentage	3P%	3-point field goal percentage	FT%	Free throw percentage
RPG	Rebounds per game	APG	Assists per game	SPG	Steals per game
BPG	Blocks per game	PPG	Points per game	**Bold**	Career high
†	Won an NBA championship	*	Led the league

=== NBA ===
==== Regular season ====
Year	Team	GP	MPG	FG%	FT%	RPG	APG	PPG
1951–52†	Minneapolis	61	13.9	.358	.670	4.0	.8	3.6
1952–53†	Minneapolis	70	14.7	.349	.610	3.9	.9	3.7
1953–54	Milwaukee	**72**	**34.1**	.367	.639	**9.6**	**2.0**	**8.0**
1954–55	Milwaukee	57	25.5	.387	.675	6.1	1.8	6.2
1954–55	Minneapolis	17	19.0	**.471**	.694	5.5	1.4	5.8
1955–56	Minneapolis	69	16.4	.400	**.758**	4.1	1.1	4.2
1956–57	Rochester	30	18.5	.372	.725	4.0	.5	4.8
1956–57	Philadelphia	38	15.2	.377	.703	3.5	.7	3.7
Career		414	20.2	.376	.674	5.3	1.2	5.0

=== Playoffs ===
Year	Team	GP	MPG	FG%	FT%	RPG	APG	PPG
1952†	Minneapolis	**13**	11.7	.360	.286	3.4	.7	1.8
1953†	Minneapolis	12*	15.8	.348	.531	5.3	.9	4.1
1955	Minneapolis	7	**19.6**	**.400**	.793	**6.0**	**1.4**	**7.9**
1956	Minneapolis	3	18.0	.308	.700	5.0	.7	5.0
1957	Philadelphia	2	1.5	.000	**1.000**	1.0	.0	1.0
Career		37	14.5	.360	.585	4.5	.9	3.9
