= 1954–55 Rochester Royals season =

NBA professional basketball team season

- Head coach: Les Harrison
- Owners: Jack Harrison; Les Harrison
- Arena: Edgerton Park Arena

Results
- Record: 29–43 (.403)
- Place: Division: 3rd (Western)
- Playoff finish: West Division Semifinals (eliminated 1–2)
- Stats at Basketball Reference
- Radio: WROC

The 1954–55 Rochester Royals season was the Royals seventh season in the NBA. This season would be notable for them hosting the very first game where the shot clock would be used, with them winning 98–95 over the Boston Celtics. During a very early portion of the season, the Royals played a game against the Baltimore Bullets on November 6, 1954, blowing out Baltimore that game with a 128–80 victory in Rochester's favor before the original Bullets team folded operations early in the season on November 27, 1954; that game they played would ultimately end up being wiped out from the official record books for the NBA's history. If the game they played was officially kept as a part of the season's record for the Royals, their official record would have had Rochester get a losing record of 30–43 instead of 29–43 for their season, though the Royals would still end up having a better record than the Milwaukee Hawks to end up qualifying for the 1955 NBA playoffs.

== Regular season ==
=== Season standings ===
| Western Division | W | L | PCT | GB | Home | Road | Neutral | Div |
|---|---|---|---|---|---|---|---|---|
| x-Fort Wayne Pistons | 43 | 29 | .597 | – | 21–6 | 9–14 | 13–9 | 28–8 |
| x-Minneapolis Lakers | 40 | 32 | .556 | 3 | 18–6 | 10–14 | 12–12 | 18–18 |
| x-Rochester Royals | 29 | 43 | .403 | 14 | 17–11 | 4–19 | 8–13 | 14–22 |
| Milwaukee Hawks | 26 | 46 | .361 | 17 | 6–11 | 9–16 | 11–19 | 14–22 |

x – clinched playoff spot

=== Game log ===
1954–55 Game log
| # | Date | Opponent | Score | High points | Record |
| 1 | October 30 | Boston | 95–98 | Bobby Wanzer (25) | 1–0 |
| — | November 6 | Baltimore | 80–128 | — | 1–0 |
| 2 | November 7 | @ Fort Wayne | 84–109 | Arnie Risen (20) | 1–1 |
| 3 | November 10 | Milwaukee | 86–90 | Jack McMahon (17) | 2–1 |
| 4 | November 11 | @ New York | 78–79 | Odie Spears (15) | 2–2 |
| 5 | November 13 | Fort Wayne | 103–98 | Spears, Spoelstra (18) | 2–3 |
| 6 | November 16 | @ Boston | 98–99 | Tom Marshall (23) | 2–4 |
| 7 | November 20 | Syracuse | 80–79 | Arnie Risen (19) | 2–5 |
| 8 | November 21 | @ Fort Wayne | 78–89 | Odie Spears (18) | 2–6 |
| 9 | November 24 | @ Milwaukee | 90–87 (OT) | Bobby Wanzer (22) | 3–6 |
| 10 | November 25 | @ Minneapolis | 84–95 | Arnie Risen (16) | 3–7 |
| 11 | November 27 | Boston | 101–107 | Bobby Wanzer (24) | 4–7 |
| 12 | December 1 | Fort Wayne | 101–96 (OT) | Arnie Risen (26) | 4–8 |
| 13 | December 2 | @ Syracuse | 78–82 | Don Henriksen (15) | 4–9 |
| 14 | December 4 | @ Boston | 102–110 | Arnie Risen (22) | 4–10 |
| 15 | December 5 | @ Fort Wayne | 97–96 | McMahon, Wanzer (18) | 5–10 |
| 16 | December 7 | N Boston | 93–95 | Jack Coleman (21) | 5–11 |
| 17 | December 8 | Syracuse | 78–105 | Jack McMahon (20) | 6–11 |
| 18 | December 11 | Minneapolis | 91–83 | Bobby Wanzer (20) | 6–12 |
| 19 | December 12 | N Milwaukee | 74–86 | Don Henriksen (20) | 6–13 |
| 20 | December 15 | N Minneapolis | 99–97 (OT) | Arnie Risen (25) | 7–13 |
| 21 | December 18 | Fort Wayne | 87–86 | Bob Davies (20) | 7–14 |
| 22 | December 19 | N Philadelphia | 92–79 | Bobby Wanzer (21) | 8–14 |
| 23 | December 25 | Fort Wayne | 73–80 | Bob Davies (25) | 9–14 |
| 24 | December 28 | N Syracuse | 84–82 | Arnie Risen (19) | 9–15 |
| 25 | December 29 | New York | 89–93 | Bobby Wanzer (21) | 10–15 |
| 26 | January 1 | Philadelphia | 92–96 | Bob Davies (18) | 11–15 |
| 27 | January 2 | @ Minneapolis | 102–100 | Arnie Risen (22) | 12–15 |
| 28 | January 4 | @ Milwaukee | 80–92 | Arnie Risen (21) | 12–16 |
| 29 | January 5 | New York | 85–103 | Tom Marshall (18) | 13–16 |
| 30 | January 6 | N Fort Wayne | 83–90 | Don Henriksen (13) | 13–17 |
| 31 | January 8 | Milwaukee | 88–91 | Tom Marshall (21) | 14–17 |
| 32 | January 9 | @ Boston | 92–98 | Jack McMahon (22) | 14–18 |
| 33 | January 11 | N Milwaukee | 90–93 | Davies, Wanzer (21) | 14–19 |
| 34 | January 12 | Minneapolis | 102–88 | Davies, McMahon, Wanzer (14) | 14–20 |
| 35 | January 15 | Minneapolis | 90–93 | Odie Spears (25) | 15–20 |
| 36 | January 16 | @ Syracuse | 85–90 | Coleman, Wanzer (18) | 15–21 |
| 37 | January 19 | N New York | 83–98 | Jack McMahon (22) | 15–22 |
| 38 | January 22 | Boston | 110–121 | Bob Davies (25) | 16–22 |
| 39 | January 23 | @ Fort Wayne | 84–105 | Jack Coleman (21) | 16–23 |
| 40 | January 24 | N Milwaukee | 97–86 | Jack Coleman (17) | 17–23 |
| 41 | January 25 | N New York | 107–104 | Bobby Wanzer (25) | 18–23 |
| 42 | January 26 | New York | 94–96 | Tom Marshall (21) | 19–23 |
| 43 | January 27 | N Boston | 98–92 | McMahon, Wanzer (19) | 20–23 |
| 44 | January 29 | Philadelphia | 85–87 | Bob Davies (25) | 21–23 |
| 45 | January 31 | @ Milwaukee | 80–100 | Jack McMahon (15) | 21–24 |
| 46 | February 2 | Fort Wayne | 74–84 | Jack Coleman (18) | 22–24 |
| 47 | February 3 | N Milwaukee | 88–87 | Bobby Wanzer (20) | 23–24 |
| 48 | February 4 | @ Philadelphia | 101–109 | Bob Davies (19) | 23–25 |
| 49 | February 5 | Syracuse | 94–88 | Bob Davies (24) | 23–26 |
| 50 | February 6 | @ Fort Wayne | 75–92 | Bob Davies (14) | 23–27 |
| 51 | February 9 | Milwaukee | 75–74 | Jack Coleman (17) | 23–28 |
| 52 | February 11 | N Fort Wayne | 91–83 | Henriksen, Wanzer (13) | 24–28 |
| 53 | February 12 | Minneapolis | 96–95 | Bob Davies (17) | 24–29 |
| 54 | February 13 | @ Syracuse | 87–88 | Risen, Spoelstra (18) | 24–30 |
| 55 | February 14 | N Philadelphia | 72–79 | Arnie Risen (16) | 24–31 |
| 56 | February 15 | N Philadelphia | 113–114 | Bob Davies (27) | 24–32 |
| 57 | February 16 | N Philadelphia | 96–98 | Bobby Wanzer (23) | 24–33 |
| 58 | February 17 | N Philadelphia | 73–78 | Tom Marshall (22) | 24–34 |
| 59 | February 19 | Milwaukee | 84–78 | Arnie Risen (15) | 24–35 |
| 60 | February 20 | @ Minneapolis | 92–105 | Bobby Wanzer (22) | 24–36 |
| 61 | February 21 | N Minneapolis | 110–112 | Bob Davies (20) | 24–37 |
| 62 | February 22 | @ Milwaukee | 87–71 | Arnie Risen (19) | 25–37 |
| 63 | February 24 | @ Syracuse | 83–97 | Risen, Wanzer (20) | 25–38 |
| 64 | February 26 | Philadelphia | 80–88 | Jack Coleman (22) | 26–38 |
| 65 | February 27 | @ Minneapolis | 84–93 | Arnie Risen (16) | 26–39 |
| 66 | March 3 | N Minneapolis | 83–76 | Bob Davies (17) | 27–39 |
| 67 | March 4 | N New York | 92–95 | Bob Davies (23) | 27–40 |
| 68 | March 5 | Minneapolis | 107–104 (OT) | Davies, Wanzer (21) | 27–41 |
| 69 | March 6 | @ New York | 96–101 | Bobby Wanzer (18) | 27–42 |
| 70 | March 8 | N New York | 96–99 | Bob Davies (20) | 27–43 |
| 71 | March 9 | Syracuse | 97–100 | Tom Marshall (16) | 28–43 |
| 72 | March 12 | Boston | 103–105 | Jack Coleman (21) | 29–43 |

== Playoffs ==
1955 playoff game log
Division Semifinals: 1–2 (home: 1–0; road: 0–2)

| Game | Date | Team | Score | High points | Location Attendance | Series |
|---|---|---|---|---|---|---|
| 1 | March 16 | @ Rochester | L 78–82 | Bobby Wanzer (30) | St. Paul Auditorium; 4,841 | 0–1 |
| 2 | March 18 | Rochester | W 94–92 | Arnie Risen (19) | Edgerton Park Arena | 1–1 |
| 3 | March 19 | @ Rochester | L 110–119 | Arnie Risen (24) | St. Paul Auditorium; 4,219 | 1–2 |

1955 schedule

== Player statistics ==
Legend
| GP | Games played | GS | Games started | MPG | Minutes per game |
| FG% | Field-goal percentage | 3P% | 3-point field-goal percentage | FT% | Free-throw percentage |
| RPG | Rebounds per game | APG | Assists per game | SPG | Steals per game |
| BPG | Blocks per game | PPG | Points per game |

=== Season ===
| Player | GP | GS | MPG | FG% | 3FG% | FT% | RPG | APG | SPG | BPG | PPG |
|---|---|---|---|---|---|---|---|---|---|---|---|
| Cal Christensen | | | | | | | | | | | |
| Jack Coleman | | | | | | | | | | | |
| Bob Davies | | | | | | | | | | | |
| Don Henriksen | | | | | | | | | | | |
| Tom Marshall | | | | | | | | | | | |
| Jack McMahon | | | | | | | | | | | |
| Boris Nachamkin | | | | | | | | | | | |
| Arnie Risen | | | | | | | | | | | |
| Odie Spears | | | | | | | | | | | |
| Art Spoelstra | | | | | | | | | | | |
| Bobby Wanzer | | | | | | | | | | | |

=== Playoffs ===
| Player | GP | GS | MPG | FG% | 3FG% | FT% | RPG | APG | SPG | BPG | PPG |
|---|---|---|---|---|---|---|---|---|---|---|---|
| Cal Christensen | | | | | | | | | | | |
| Jack Coleman | | | | | | | | | | | |
| Bob Davies | | | | | | | | | | | |
| Don Henriksen | | | | | | | | | | | |
| Tom Marshall | | | | | | | | | | | |
| Jack McMahon | | | | | | | | | | | |
| Arnie Risen | | | | | | | | | | | |
| Odie Spears | | | | | | | | | | | |
| Art Spoelstra | | | | | | | | | | | |
| Bobby Wanzer | | | | | | | | | | | |
