= Red Davis (basketball) =

American basketball player

Personal information
- Born: April 22, 1932 (age 94)
- Listed height: 6 ft 7 in (2.01 m)
- Listed weight: 220 lb (100 kg)

Career information
- High school: Manhattan College HS (Manhattan, New York)
- College: St. John's
- NBA draft: 1954: 6th round, 52nd overall pick
- Drafted by: Rochester Royals
- Playing career: 1953–1960
- Position: Center
- Number: 6
- Coaching career: 1966–1967

Career history

Playing
- 1953–1954: Hazleton Pros
- 1954–1955: Carbondale Celtics / Scranton Miners
- 1954–1958: Wilkes-Barre Barons
- 1955–1956: Rochester Royals
- 1956–1957: Williamsport Billies
- 1957–1958: Hazleton Pros
- 1959–1960: Wilkes-Barre Barons

Coaching
- 1966–1967: Wilkes-Barre Barons

Career highlights
- 2× EPBL champion (1955, 1956); All-EPBL First Team (1955)
- Stats at NBA.com
- Stats at Basketball Reference

James "Red" R. Davis (born April 22, 1932) is an American former professional basketball player who spent one season in the National Basketball Association (NBA) as a member of the Rochester Royals during the 1955–56 season. He attended St. John's University where he played on their basketball team. He was drafted by the Royals in the sixth round of the 1954 NBA draft.

Davis played in the Eastern Professional Basketball League (EPBL) for the Hazleton Pros, Carbondale Celtics / Scranton Miners, Wilkes-Barre Barons and Williamsport Billies from 1953 to 1960. He was selected to the All-EPBL First Team in 1955. Davis won EPBL championships with the Barons in 1955 and 1956. He served as head coach of the Barons during the 1966–67 season and accumulated a 14–13 record.

== Career statistics ==
Legend
GP	Games played	GS	Games started	MPG	Minutes per game
FG%	Field goal percentage	3P%	3-point field goal percentage	FT%	Free throw percentage
RPG	Rebounds per game	APG	Assists per game	SPG	Steals per game
BPG	Blocks per game	PPG	Points per game	**Bold**	Career high

=== NBA ===
==== Regular season ====
Year	Team	GP	MPG	FG%	FT%	RPG	APG	PPG
1955–56	Rochester	3	5.3	.000	1.000	1.3	.3	.7
