= Albert Barthelme =

American basketball player and coach (1919–2004)

Personal information
- Born: October 10, 1919 Blue Point, New York, U.S.
- Died: March 4, 2004 (aged 84) Chaptico, Maryland, U.S.

Career information
- College: Loyola (Maryland) (1945–1946)

Career history

Coaching
- 1944–1945: Loyola (Maryland)
- 1946–1951: Towson Catholic HS
- 1951–1954: University of Baltimore
- 1954: Baltimore Bullets
- 1961–?: St. Mary's (Maryland)

Albert Lewis Barthelme Sr. (October 10, 1919 – March 4, 2004) was an American basketball coach at the high school, college and professional levels.

Barthelme was a track and basketball star at Morris High School in New York City. After graduating, he enlisted in the United States Coast Guard and played for the Cutters basketball team. He became head coach of the Loyola College Greyhounds basketball team in 1944 after Lefty Reitz entered the United States Navy. He enrolled in the college the following year and played for the team during the 1945–46 season. From 1946 to 1951 he was athletics director, basketball and football coach at Towson Catholic High School where one of his students was future NBA player and coach Gene Shue.

Barthelme was head basketball coach at the University of Baltimore from 1951 to 1954. Using an offense-dominated approach dubbed "firehouse" basketball, he was the subject of numerous newspaper stories about the high-scoring games. Seven games into the 1953–1954 season, the team was averaging well over 100 points per game.

An assistant coach and publicist for the Baltimore Bullets 1954–1955 season, Barthelme was named head coach on November 20, 1954 but would only coach three games before the club went out of business on November 27. However, due to the abrupt nature of the original Bullets team shutting down operations as a franchise, both the final games Bee coached for Baltimore and the only games Barthelme coached for the Bullets weren't officially recognized by the NBA.

Barthelme was a survivor of the 1956 Oyster Roast Fire, which killed 10 and injured 227.

In 1961, Barthelme coached basketball for St. Mary's Seminary Junior College and Patuxent Naval Base.

Following his brief NBA stint, Barthelme worked in public relations at Carling Brewing Co., later becoming a beer distributor in 1962. From 1966 to 1985 he served as supervisor of the St. Mary's County, Maryland Youth Commission which later became the Department of Parks and Recreation.

== Head coaching record ==
Legend
Regular season	G	Games coached	W	Games won	L	Games lost	W–L %	Win–loss %
Playoffs	PG	Playoff games	PW	Playoff wins	PL	Playoff losses	PW–L %	Playoff win–loss %

Team	Year	G	W	L	W–L%	Finish	PG	PW	PL	PW–L%	Result
Baltimore	1954–55	3	1	2	.333	(team folded)	—	—	—	—	(games nullified)
