= 1954 NBA draft =

Basketball player selection

General information
- Sport: Basketball
- Date: April 24, 1954
- Location: New York City, New York
- Network: NBC

Overview
- 100 total selections in 13 rounds
- League: NBA
- Teams: 9
- First selection: Frank Selvy, Baltimore Bullets
- Hall of Famers: 2: F Bob Pettit; G Richie Guerin

The 1954 NBA draft was the eighth annual draft of the National Basketball Association (NBA). The draft was held on April 24, 1954, before the 1954–55 season. In this draft, nine NBA teams took turns selecting amateur U.S. college basketball players. In each round, the teams select in reverse order of their win–loss record in the previous season. The draft consisted of 13 rounds comprising 100 players selected.

== Draft selections and draftee career notes ==
Frank Selvy from Furman University was selected first overall by the Baltimore Bullets. Second pick of the draft, Bob Pettit from Louisiana State University, has been inducted to the Basketball Hall of Fame. Pettit also won the Rookie of the Year Award in his first season.

== Key ==
Pos.	G	F	C
Position	Guard	Forward	Center

^	Denotes player who has been inducted to the Naismith Memorial Basketball Hall of Fame
*	Denotes player who has been selected for at least one All-Star Game and All-NBA Team
^{+}	Denotes player who has been selected for at least one All-Star Game
^{#}	Denotes player who has never appeared in an NBA regular-season or playoff game
^{~}	Denotes player who has been selected as Rookie of the Year

== Draft ==
Round	Pick	Player	Position	Nationality	Team	College
1	1	Frank Selvy^{+}	G/F	United States	Baltimore Bullets	Furman
1	2	Bob Pettit^^{~}	F/C	United States	Milwaukee Hawks	LSU
1	3	Gene Shue*	G	United States	Philadelphia Warriors	Maryland
1	4	Dick Rosenthal	G/F	United States	Fort Wayne Pistons	Notre Dame
1	5	Togo Palazzi	G/F	United States	Boston Celtics	Holy Cross
1	6	Johnny Kerr^{+}	F/C	United States	Syracuse Nationals	Illinois
1	7	Tom Marshall	G/F	United States	Rochester Royals	Western Kentucky
1	8	Jack Turner	G/F	United States	New York Knicks	Western Kentucky
1	9	Ed Kalafat	F/C	United States	Minneapolis Lakers	Minnesota
2	10	Bobby Leonard	G	United States	Baltimore Bullets	Indiana
2	11	Bob Mattick^{#}	C	United States	Milwaukee Hawks	Oklahoma A&M
2	12	Larry Costello*	G	United States	Philadelphia Warriors	Niagara
2	13	Arnold Short^{#}	G	United States	Fort Wayne Pistons	Oklahoma City
2	14	Red Morrison	F/C	United States	Boston Celtics	Idaho
2	15	Dick Farley	G/F	United States	Syracuse Nationals	Indiana
2	16	Boris Nachamkin	F	United States	Rochester Royals	NYU
2	17	Richie Guerin^	G	United States	New York Knicks	Iona
2	18	Al Bianchi	G	United States	Minneapolis Lakers	Bowling Green

== Other picks ==
The following list includes other draft picks who have appeared in at least one NBA game.

Round	Pick	Player	Position	Nationality	Team	College
3	24	Jim Tucker	F	United States	Syracuse Nationals	Duquesne
3	26	Don Anielak	F	United States	New York Knicks	SW Missouri State
4	29	Phil Martin	G	United States	Milwaukee Hawks	Toledo
4	30	Chuck Noble^{+}	G	United States	Philadelphia Warriors	Louisville
4	34	Art Spoelstra	C	United States	Rochester Royals	Western Kentucky
5	43	Bo Erias	F	United States	Rochester Royals	Niagara
6	47	Bob Carney	G	United States	Milwaukee Hawks	Bradley
6	52	Red Davis	F/C	United States	Rochester Royals	St. John's
8	67	Don Bielke	C	United States	Fort Wayne Pistons	Valparaíso
9	80	Dick Garmaker*	G/F	United States	Minneapolis Lakers	Minnesota
11	95	Jim Paxson	G/F	United States	Rochester Royals	Dayton

== Notable undrafted players ==
These players were not selected in the 1954 draft but played at least one game in the NBA.

Player	Pos.	Nationality	School/club team
McCoy Ingram	F	United States	Jackson State
Dan King	F	United States	Western Kentucky
Jackie Moore	F	United States	La Salle
Worthy Patterson	G	United States	UConn

== See also ==
- List of first overall NBA draft picks
