= 1954–55 Fort Wayne Pistons season =

NBA team season

- Division champions
- Head coach: Charles Eckman
- Owner: Fred Zollner
- Arena: War Memorial Coliseum

Results
- Record: 43–29 (.597)
- Place: Division: 1st (Western)
- Playoff finish: NBA Finals (eliminated 3–4)
- Stats at Basketball Reference

The 1954–55 Fort Wayne Pistons season was the seventh season for the Pistons in the National Basketball Association (NBA) and 14th season as a franchise.

With new coach and former referee Charley Eckman, the Pistons finished 43-29 (.597), first in the NBA Western Division. During the early part of the season, the Pistons played two games against the Baltimore Bullets, including the very last match the original Bullets team ever played altogether, before that same Bullets squad folded operations early in the season on November 27, 1954; both of the games played would be Pistons victories that ultimately ended up being wiped out from the official record books for the NBA's history. If the games played were officially kept as a part of the season's record for the Pistons, their official record would have had Fort Wayne get a winning record of 45–29 instead of 43–29 for their season. In the Western Division Finals, the Pistons eliminated the Minneapolis Lakers 3–1 in a best-of-five series to reach the NBA Finals. In the 7-game series with the Syracuse Nationals, the teams held home court advantage, although Fort Wayne would play "at home" in Indianapolis because Fort Wayne arena management did not plan for the Pistons to make the NBA Finals, and the arena was booked for a bowling conference after March 4.

In the 7th game in Syracuse, Syracuse's George King made a free throw with 12 seconds left to put the Nationals up 92–91. King then stole the ball from Fort Wayne's Andy Phillip with three seconds remaining to clinch the victory for Syracuse.

Rumors about the finish continue with suggestions that some Fort Wayne players conspired with gamblers to throw the series to Syracuse. In the 7th game, Fort Wayne led Syracuse 41–24 early in the second quarter, then allowed the Nationals to rally to win the game. Andy Phillip, who turned the ball over with three seconds left in the game, was believed by at least one of his teammates, George Yardley, to have thrown the game. "There were always unwholesome implications about that ball game", Yardley would later comment.

However, Phillip may not have acted alone. Other Pistons players were strongly believed to have thrown games during the 1954 and 1955 NBA seasons, with Piston Jack Molinas banned from the league for gambling the year prior. In fact, Yardley himself turned the ball over to Syracuse with a palming violation with 18 seconds remaining in Game 7. The foul that gave Syracuse its winning free throw, meanwhile, was committed by Frankie Brian. The NBA did not return to the 2–3–2 format until 1985.

The team was led on the season by a double-double from center Larry Foust (17.0 ppg, 10.0 rpg, NBA All-Star), guard Andy Phillip (9.6 ppg, 7.7 apg, NBA All-Star) and forward George Yardley (17.3 ppg, 9.9 rpg, NBA All-Star).

== Roster ==
1954–55 Fort Wayne Pistons roster
Players

Pos.	No.	Player	Height	Weight	DOB	From
SG	7	Frankie Brian	6 ft 1 in (1.85 m)		May 1, 1923	LSU
C	16	Larry Foust	6 ft 9 in (2.06 m)	215 lb (98 kg)	June 24, 1928	La Salle
PF	8	Jim Fritsche	6 ft 8 in (2.03 m)	210 lb (95 kg)	December 10, 1931	Hamline
C	8	Bob Houbregs	6 ft 8 in (2.03 m)	225 lb (102 kg)	March 12, 1932	Washington
PF	9	Mel Hutchins	6 ft 6 in (1.98 m)	200 lb (91 kg)	November 22, 1928	BYU
PF	17	Monk Meineke	6 ft 7 in (2.01 m)	208 lb (94 kg)	October 30, 1930	Dayton
PG	14	Andy Phillip	6 ft 2 in (1.88 m)	195 lb (88 kg)	March 7, 1922	Illinois
SG	18	Al Roges	6 ft 4 in (1.93 m)	195 lb (88 kg)	October 25, 1930	Long Island
SF	15	Dick Rosenthal	6 ft 5 in (1.96 m)	205 lb (93 kg)	January 20, 1930	Notre Dame
SG	5	Paul Walther	6 ft 2 in (1.88 m)	160 lb (73 kg)	March 23, 1927	Tennessee
SF	12	George Yardley	6 ft 5 in (1.96 m)	190 lb (86 kg)	November 3, 1928	Stanford
SG	10	Max Zaslofsky	6 ft 2 in (1.88 m)	170 lb (77 kg)	December 7, 1925	St. John's

Coaches
Head coach

Charles Eckman

Legend
- (DP) Unsigned draft pick
- (FA) Free agent
- (S) Suspended
- Injured

Roster

== Regular season ==
=== Season standings ===
Western Division	W	L	PCT	GB	Home	Road	Neutral	Div
x-Fort Wayne Pistons	43	29	.597	–	21–6	9–14	13–9	28–8
x-Minneapolis Lakers	40	32	.556	3	18–6	10–14	12–12	18–18
x-Rochester Royals	29	43	.403	14	17–11	4–19	8–13	14–22
Milwaukee Hawks	26	46	.361	17	6–11	9–16	11–19	14–22

x – clinched playoff spot

=== Game log ===
1954–55 Game log
#	Date	Opponent	Score	High points	Record
1	October 30	@ Milwaukee	91–72	Hutchins, Yardley, Zaslofsky (14)	1–0
2	October 31	Boston	86–90	Mel Hutchins (22)	2–0
3	November 6	New York	83–90	Don Meineke (16)	3–0
4	November 7	Rochester	84–109	George Yardley (22)	4–0
5	November 11	Syracuse	88–86	Larry Foust (23)	4–1
6	November 13	@ Rochester	103–98	Mel Hutchins (22)	5–1
7	November 14	Milwaukee	91–93	Andy Phillip (23)	6–1
8	November 18	@ Syracuse	82–91	Larry Foust (30)	6–2
—	November 19	@ Baltimore	103–92	—	6–2
9	November 20	@ Philadelphia	82–99	Don Meineke (15)	6–3
10	November 21	Rochester	78–89	Larry Foust (23)	7–3
11	November 24	N Philadelphia	91–87	Mel Hutchins (20)	7–4
—	November 25	Baltimore	89–92	—	7–4
12	November 27	Minneapolis	81–97	Mel Hutchins (22)	8–4
13	November 28	Milwaukee	81–96	George Yardley (17)	9–4
14	November 30	N Minneapolis	90–92	George Yardley (29)	10–4
15	December 1	@ Rochester	101–96 (OT)	Larry Foust (37)	11–4
16	December 2	Boston	98–116	George Yardley (32)	12–4
17	December 4	@ New York	90–88	Larry Foust (24)	13–4
18	December 5	Rochester	97–96	Larry Foust (21)	13–5
19	December 7	N Milwaukee	85–101	George Yardley (29)	14–5
20	December 8	N Milwaukee	68–92	Max Zaslofsky (17)	15–5
21	December 12	Boston	99–100	Larry Foust (28)	16–5
22	December 15	N Philadelphia	99–90	George Yardley (24)	16–6
23	December 18	@ Rochester	87–86	Andy Phillip (24)	17–6
24	December 19	Milwaukee	82–87	Dick Rosenthal (22)	18–6
25	December 23	N Philadelphia	92–82	George Yardley (22)	19–6
26	December 25	@ Rochester	73–80	George Yardley (17)	19–7
27	December 26	Philadelphia	96–109	Frank Brian (31)	20–7
28	December 30	N Minneapolis	76–93	George Yardley (26)	21–7
29	December 31	Minneapolis	103–91	George Yardley (22)	21–8
30	January 2	Philadelphia	66–89	George Yardley (24)	22–8
31	January 4	N Minneapolis	92–93	George Yardley (28)	23–8
32	January 5	N Milwaukee	97–92	Max Zaslofsky (16)	23–9
33	January 6	N Rochester	83–90	Mel Hutchins (19)	24–9
34	January 9	Minneapolis	86–89	George Yardley (29)	25–9
35	January 11	Boston	119–110	Larry Foust (33)	25–10
36	January 13	@ Syracuse	83–100	Bob Houbregs (14)	25–11
37	January 14	N New York	97–83	George Yardley (20)	25–12
38	January 15	@ New York	87–106	Frank Brian (17)	25–13
39	January 16	Milwaukee	78–89	George Yardley (19)	26–13
40	January 19	N Boston	105–84	George Yardley (29)	27–13
41	January 22	@ Milwaukee	85–83	Larry Foust (18)	28–13
42	January 23	Rochester	84–105	Dick Rosenthal (18)	29–13
43	January 25	N Syracuse	66–69	Frank Brian (14)	30–13
44	January 26	@ Boston	90–99	Andy Phillip (15)	30–14
45	January 27	@ Syracuse	79–94	Mel Hutchins (16)	30–15
46	January 29	@ Minneapolis	91–100	Larry Foust (23)	30–16
47	January 30	Minneapolis	92–99	Larry Foust (34)	31–16
48	January 31	N New York	91–84	Frank Brian (27)	31–17
49	February 2	@ Rochester	74–84	Frank Brian (22)	31–18
50	February 3	Syracuse	85–104	Larry Foust (22)	32–18
51	February 5	@ Philadelphia	96–88	Larry Foust (25)	33–18
52	February 6	Rochester	75–92	George Yardley (19)	34–18
53	February 10	Philadelphia	97–105	Max Zaslofsky (19)	35–18
54	February 11	N Rochester	91–83	Foust, Yardley (16)	35–19
55	February 12	@ New York	82–88	Larry Foust (26)	35–20
56	February 13	Milwaukee	78–90	Larry Foust (19)	36–20
57	February 14	N New York	92–88	Larry Foust (19)	36–21
58	February 17	N New York	93–86	Andy Phillip (14)	36–22
59	February 19	@ Minneapolis	92–98	George Yardley (28)	36–23
60	February 20	Milwaukee	87–96	Larry Foust (22)	37–23
61	February 23	N Minneapolis	97–120	Larry Foust (26)	38–23
62	February 24	N Milwaukee	85–95	Mel Hutchins (20)	39–23
63	February 26	@ Minneapolis	90–89	Larry Foust (24)	40–23
64	February 27	New York	95–83	Larry Foust (22)	40–24
65	February 28	N Minneapolis	88–90	Andy Phillip (19)	41–24
66	March 1	N Boston	118–98	Max Zaslofsky (18)	42–24
67	March 2	N Syracuse	103–90	George Yardley (16)	42–25
68	March 3	Syracuse	83–81	Larry Foust (22)	42–26
69	March 6	@ Boston	104–108	George Yardley (32)	42–27
70	March 7	@ Boston	91–110	Don Meineke (23)	42–28
71	March 10	N Philadelphia	91–93 (OT)	George Yardley (27)	43–28
72	March 12	@ Syracuse	92–112	George Yardley (24)	43–29

== Playoffs ==
1955 playoff game log
Division Finals: 3–1 (home: 2–0; road: 1–1)

Game	Date	Team	Score	High points	Location	Series
1	March 20	Minneapolis	W 96–79	Larry Foust (15)	North Side Gymnasium	1–0
2	March 22	Minneapolis	W 98–97 (OT)	Mel Hutchins (20)	Butler Fieldhouse	2–0
3	March 23	@ Minneapolis	L 91–99 (OT)	George Yardley (25)	Minneapolis Auditorium	2–1
4	March 27	@ Minneapolis	W 105–96	Rosenthal, Hutchins (21)	Minneapolis Auditorium	3–1

NBA Finals: 3–4 (home: 3–0; road: 0–4)

Game	Date	Team	Score	High points	High assists	Location Attendance	Series
1	March 31	@ Syracuse	L 82–86	Larry Foust (26)	—	Onondaga War Memorial; 7,500	0–1
2	April 2	@ Syracuse	L 84–87	George Yardley (21)	—	Onondaga War Memorial; 5,845	0–2
3	April 3	Syracuse	W 96–89	Mel Hutchins (23)	—	Butler Fieldhouse; 3,200	1–2
4	April 5	Syracuse	W 109–102	Frankie Brian (18)	—	Butler Fieldhouse; 2,611	2–2
5	April 7	Syracuse	W 74–71	George Yardley (16)	—	Butler Fieldhouse; 4,110	3–2
6	April 9	@ Syracuse	L 104–109	George Yardley (31)	—	Onondaga War Memorial; 4,997	3–3
7	April 10	@ Syracuse	L 91–92	Larry Foust (24)	Andy Phillip (10)	Onondaga War Memorial; 6,697	3–4

1955 schedule

== Awards and records ==
- Larry Foust, All-NBA First Team
