= 1954–55 Milwaukee Hawks season =

NBA professional basketball team season

- Head coach: Red Holzman
- Arena: Milwaukee Arena

Results
- Record: 26–46 (.361)
- Place: Division: 4th (Western)
- Playoff finish: Did not qualify
- Stats at Basketball Reference

The 1954–55 Milwaukee Hawks season was the Hawks' ninth season of existence, their sixth season in the NBA, and the fourth and final season in Milwaukee. During the early part of the season, the Hawks were the only team that played one game against the original Baltimore Bullets to end up losing to that same squad in question (and consequently the only team to not win a game against the Bullets), losing that match 99–92 in Milwaukee for what turned out to be the original Bullets' final victory ever done in franchise history on November 20, 1954 (as well as the only NBA game that new Bullets head coach Albert Barthelme would get a win as an NBA head coach in general); that same Bullets franchise would later fold operations a week later on November 27. Thankfully for the Hawks, that loss would end up being wiped out from the official record books for the NBA's history. However, if their loss was officially kept as a part of the season's record for the Hawks, their official record would have had Milwaukee hold an even worse losing record of 26–47 instead of 26–46 as the official worst record of the season. This season was also notable for the Hawks originally having the lowest-scoring effort in one game in the NBA season that debuted the shot clock, with Milwaukee scoring only 57 points in a neutral sited match held in Providence, Rhode Island on February 27, 1955, which resulted in a surprisingly close 62–57 defeat to the Boston Celtics near the end of their season. In the NBA's post-shot clock era, that game by the Hawks would remain the lowest-scoring effort from one team that would be willingly recognized by the league (primarily because of the shot clock's implementation) in over 40 years before it later was tied twice in 1996 by the Philadelphia 76ers (the current rendition of this season's championship winning Syracuse Nationals) and the Orlando Magic before later being broken by the Utah Jazz twice (once in the 1998 NBA Finals and once in the 1999 lockout-shortened regular season period) and then by the Chicago Bulls near the end of that lockout-shortened 1999 season, with Chicago's 49 points in 1999 being the current-day record of infamy to this day. After this season's conclusion, the Hawks would move again, this time to St. Louis, Missouri for the following season. The Hawks would bring a return to NBA basketball in St. Louis after the St. Louis Bombers folded in 1950, staying in St. Louis until 1968.

There would not be another NBA franchise in Milwaukee until the Bucks began play themselves in 1968, coincidentally enough.

== Regular season ==
=== Season standings ===
Western Division	W	L	PCT	GB	Home	Road	Neutral	Div
x-Fort Wayne Pistons	43	29	.597	–	21–6	9–14	13–9	28–8
x-Minneapolis Lakers	40	32	.556	3	18–6	10–14	12–12	18–18
x-Rochester Royals	29	43	.403	14	17–11	4–19	8–13	14–22
Milwaukee Hawks	26	46	.361	17	6–11	9–16	11–19	14–22

x – clinched playoff spot

=== Game log ===
1954–55 Game log
#	Date	Opponent	Score	High points	Record
1	October 30	Fort Wayne	91–72	Bob Pettit (17)	0–1
2	November 2	New York	91–84	Ken McBride (30)	0–2
3	November 6	N Minneapolis	79–67	Bob Pettit (18)	0–3
4	November 7	@ Syracuse	80–97	Bob Pettit (23)	0–4
5	November 10	@ Rochester	86–90	Bob Pettit (25)	0–5
6	November 11	N Boston	95–85	Chuck Share (22)	1–5
7	November 13	Syracuse	72–85	Chuck Cooper (23)	2–5
8	November 14	@ Fort Wayne	91–93	Chuck Cooper (27)	2–6
—	November 20	@ Baltimore	92–99	—	2–6
9	November 24	Rochester	90–87 (OT)	Lew Hitch (20)	2–7
10	November 25	@ Syracuse	85–91	Bob Pettit (23)	2–8
11	November 28	@ Fort Wayne	81–96	Bob Pettit (19)	2–9
12	November 30	Boston	118–99	Frank Selvy (35)	2–10
13	December 1	N Boston	90–101	Bob Pettit (29)	2–11
14	December 2	N Minneapolis	108–117	Frank Selvy (42)	3–11
15	December 3	N Philadelphia	110–91	Bob Pettit (23)	3–12
16	December 4	Minneapolis	88–95	Frank Selvy (31)	4–12
17	December 5	@ Minneapolis	102–104 (OT)	Bob Pettit (25)	4–13
18	December 7	N Fort Wayne	85–101	Frank Selvy (17)	4–14
19	December 8	N Fort Wayne	68–92	Bob Pettit (24)	4–15
20	December 11	New York	97–87	Bob Pettit (19)	4–16
21	December 12	N Rochester	74–86	Lew Hitch (20)	5–16
22	December 15	@ Boston	106–117	Chuck Share (21)	5–17
23	December 18	New York	91–85	Frank Selvy (23)	5–18
24	December 19	@ Fort Wayne	82–87	Bob Pettit (24)	5–19
25	December 25	Boston	108–99	Chuck Cooper (26)	5–20
26	December 31	N New York	64–89	Hitch, Selvy (16)	6–20
27	January 1	@ New York	91–100	Frank Selvy (31)	6–21
28	January 2	@ Syracuse	91–79	Bob Harrison (30)	7–21
29	January 4	Rochester	80–92	Bob Pettit (36)	8–21
30	January 5	N Fort Wayne	97–92	Bob Pettit (33)	9–21
31	January 6	N Philadelphia	92–79	Bob Pettit (27)	9–22
32	January 7	N New York	75–85	Bob Pettit (30)	10–22
33	January 8	@ Rochester	88–91	Bob Pettit (34)	10–23
34	January 9	Syracuse	72–77	Frank Selvy (26)	11–23
35	January 11	N Rochester	90–93	Bob Pettit (31)	12–23
36	January 14	Philadelphia	84–86	Frank Selvy (22)	13–23
37	January 15	Philadelphia	93–88	Frank Selvy (18)	13–24
38	January 16	@ Fort Wayne	78–89	Frank Selvy (20)	13–25
39	January 19	N Minneapolis	95–81	Frank Selvy (23)	13–26
40	January 20	N Minneapolis	97–90	Frank Selvy (40)	13–27
41	January 21	N Minneapolis	100–92	Frank Selvy (29)	13–28
42	January 22	Fort Wayne	85–83	Frank Selvy (23)	13–29
43	January 23	@ Minneapolis	79–82	Frank Selvy (17)	13–30
44	January 24	N Rochester	97–86	Frank Selvy (21)	13–31
45	January 27	N Minneapolis	79–85	Frank Selvy (23)	14–31
46	January 29	@ New York	93–95 (OT)	Chuck Cooper (21)	14–32
47	January 30	@ Boston	88–79	Chuck Share (18)	15–32
48	January 31	Rochester	80–100	Frank Selvy (23)	16–32
49	February 3	N Rochester	88–87	Bob Pettit (32)	16–33
50	February 5	N Minneapolis	103–87	Chuck Share (22)	16–34
51	February 6	@ Minneapolis	101–99	Frank Selvy (23)	17–34
52	February 8	N Philadelphia	95–102	Frank Selvy (30)	18–34
53	February 9	@ Rochester	75–74	Bob Pettit (25)	19–34
54	February 12	@ Syracuse	66–92	Bill Calhoun (13)	19–35
55	February 13	@ Fort Wayne	78–90	Bob Pettit (24)	19–36
56	February 14	N Syracuse	82–81	Chuck Share (19)	19–37
57	February 15	N Boston	103–106 (OT)	Chuck Share (28)	19–38
58	February 19	@ Rochester	84–78	Bob Pettit (27)	20–38
59	February 20	@ Fort Wayne	87–96	Bob Pettit (32)	20–39
60	February 22	Rochester	87–71	Chuck Share (24)	20–40
61	February 23	N Boston	120–103	Bob Pettit (32)	21–40
62	February 24	N Fort Wayne	85–95	Bob Pettit (19)	21–41
63	February 26	@ New York	79–72	Bob Pettit (26)	22–41
64	February 27	N Boston	57–62	Chuck Share (19)	22–42
65	February 28	N Philadelphia	101–84	Bob Pettit (35)	22–43
66	March 1	@ Philadelphia	91–88	Bob Pettit (26)	23–43
67	March 2	N Philadelphia	78–75	Bob Pettit (24)	23–44
68	March 3	N New York	103–89	Bob Harrison (18)	23–45
69	March 4	Syracuse	99–96	Bob Pettit (25)	23–46
70	March 6	@ Minneapolis	100–98	Bob Pettit (21)	24–46
71	March 13	@ Syracuse	77–76	Bob Pettit (17)	25–46
72	March 14	N Philadelphia	84–99	Bob Pettit (34)	26–46

== Awards and records ==
- Bob Pettit, NBA Rookie of the Year Award
- Bob Pettit, All-NBA First Team
