= 1954–55 Minneapolis Lakers season =

NBA professional basketball team season

- Head coach: John Kundla
- Arena: Minneapolis Auditorium

Results
- Record: 40–32 (.556)
- Place: Division: 2nd (Western)
- Playoff finish: Division finals (lost to Pistons 1–3)
- Stats at Basketball Reference

The 1954–55 Minneapolis Lakers season was the Lakers' seventh season in the NBA.

During the early part of the season, the Lakers played a total of four different games against the Baltimore Bullets before the original Bullets team folded operations early in the season on November 27, 1954; all four of the games the Lakers played against the Bullets ultimately ended up being wiped out from the official record books for the NBA's history. The Bullets would win their first game played against the Lakers that season on November 3, 1954 with a close 93–92 victory in Baltimore's favor out in Baltimore, though the Lakers would win their final three matches against them on November 11 & 12 in neutral sites and on November 21 in Minneapolis for what later became the Bullets' penultimate game played that season. If the four games played were officially kept as a part of the season's record for the Lakers, the official record would have had Minneapolis get a winning record of 43–33 instead of just 40–32 for the season, with the Lakers joining the New York Knicks as the only teams to lose to the Bullets once and get at least one victory over the Bullets once during this season before the original Baltimore franchise folded operations. The Lakers ended up playing the most games against the Bullets out of any team, with four, with no other team playing more than two.

== Roster ==
1954–55 Minneapolis Lakers roster
Players

Pos.	No.	Player	Height	Weight	DOB	From
G	18	Bob Carney	6 ft 3 in (1.91 m)	170 lb (77 kg)	1932-08-03	Bradley
F	11	Lew Hitch	6 ft 8 in (2.03 m)	200 lb (91 kg)	1929-07-16	Kansas State
F	12	Jim Holstein	6 ft 3 in (1.91 m)	180 lb (82 kg)	1930-09-24	Cincinnati
F	23	Ed Kalafat	6 ft 6 in (1.98 m)	245 lb (111 kg)	1932-10-13	Minnesota
C	34	Clyde Lovellette	6 ft 9 in (2.06 m)	234 lb (106 kg)	1929-09-07	Kansas
G	22	Slater Martin	5 ft 10 in (1.78 m)	170 lb (77 kg)	1925-10-22	Texas
F	19	Vern Mikkelsen	6 ft 7 in (2.01 m)	230 lb (104 kg)	1928-10-21	Hamline
F	17	Jim Pollard	6 ft 4 in (1.93 m)	185 lb (84 kg)	1922-07-09	Stanford
F	15	Dick Schnittker	6 ft 5 in (1.96 m)	200 lb (91 kg)	1928-05-27	Ohio State
G	20	Whitey Skoog	5 ft 11 in (1.80 m)	180 lb (82 kg)	1926-11-02	Minnesota
G	18	Don Sunderlage	6 ft 1 in (1.85 m)	180 lb (82 kg)	1929-12-20	Illinois

Coaches
Head coach

John Kundla

Legend
- (DP) Unsigned draft pick
- (FA) Free agent
- (S) Suspended
- Injured

Roster

== Regular season ==
=== Season standings ===
Western Division	W	L	PCT	GB	Home	Road	Neutral	Div
x-Fort Wayne Pistons	43	29	.597	–	21–6	9–14	13–9	28–8
x-Minneapolis Lakers	40	32	.556	3	18–6	10–14	12–12	18–18
x-Rochester Royals	29	43	.403	14	17–11	4–19	8–13	14–22
Milwaukee Hawks	26	46	.361	17	6–11	9–16	11–19	14–22

x – clinched playoff spot

=== Game log ===
#	Date	Opponent	Score	High points	Record
1	October 30	@ New York	83–94	Clyde Lovellette (18)	0–1
2	October 31	@ Syracuse	97–94	Clyde Lovellette (22)	1–1
—	November 3	@ Baltimore	92–93	—	1–1
3	November 6	N Milwaukee	79–67	Slater Martin (19)	2–1
4	November 7	New York	103–93 (OT)	Jim Pollard (23)	2–2
—	November 11	N Baltimore	97–87	—	2–2
—	November 12	N Baltimore	126–88	—	2–2
5	November 14	Syracuse	92–99	Jim Pollard (25)	3–2
—	November 21	Baltimore	85–116	—	3–2
6	November 25	Rochester	84–95	Jim Pollard (24)	4–2
7	November 27	@ Fort Wayne	81–97	Vern Mikkelsen (20)	4–3
8	November 28	Boston	108–115	Clyde Lovellette (29)	5–3
9	November 30	N Fort Wayne	90–92	Vern Mikkelsen (20)	5–4
10	December 1	@ Philadelphia	91–88	Dick Schnittker (16)	6–4
11	December 2	N Milwaukee	108–117	Clyde Lovellette (29)	6–5
12	December 4	@ Milwaukee	88–95	Clyde Lovellette (18)	6–6
13	December 5	Milwaukee	102–104 (OT)	Vern Mikkelsen (22)	7–6
14	December 7	@ New York	89–97	Clyde Lovellette (24)	7–7
15	December 8	@ Boston	101–99	Vern Mikkelsen (25)	8–7
16	December 11	@ Rochester	91–83	Whitey Skoog (22)	9–7
17	December 12	New York	73–80	Clyde Lovellette (22)	10–7
18	December 14	N Boston	108–115	Vern Mikkelsen (31)	10–8
19	December 15	N Rochester	99–97 (OT)	Vern Mikkelsen (26)	10–9
20	December 18	Syracuse	83–86	Clyde Lovellette (26)	11–9
21	December 19	@ Syracuse	93–108	Vern Mikkelsen (21)	11–10
22	December 25	Philadelphia	91–99	Vern Mikkelsen (27)	12–10
23	December 26	Boston	82–87	Vern Mikkelsen (20)	13–10
24	December 29	N Boston	129–118 (OT)	Slater Martin (35)	14–10
25	December 30	N Fort Wayne	76–93	Vern Mikkelsen (16)	14–11
26	December 31	@ Fort Wayne	103–91	Clyde Lovellette (27)	15–11
27	January 2	Rochester	102–100	Vern Mikkelsen (28)	15–12
28	January 3	N Philadelphia	74–76	Clyde Lovellette (21)	16–12
29	January 4	N Fort Wayne	92–93	Vern Mikkelsen (17)	16–13
30	January 5	@ Philadelphia	85–106	Dick Schnittker (18)	16–14
31	January 6	@ Syracuse	117–106	Vern Mikkelsen (24)	17–14
32	January 8	Syracuse	100–97	Jim Pollard (21)	17–15
33	January 9	@ Fort Wayne	86–89	Clyde Lovellette (18)	17–16
34	January 11	Syracuse	82–93	Vern Mikkelsen (24)	18–16
35	January 12	@ Rochester	102–88	Clyde Lovellette (23)	19–16
36	January 13	@ Philadelphia	96–102 (OT)	Vern Mikkelsen (22)	19–17
37	January 14	@ Boston	95–100	Clyde Lovellette (24)	19–18
38	January 15	@ Rochester	90–93	Vern Mikkelsen (21)	19–19
39	January 16	Philadelphia	98–106	Vern Mikkelsen (23)	20–19
40	January 19	N Milwaukee	95–81	Clyde Lovellette (37)	21–19
41	January 20	N Milwaukee	97–90	Vern Mikkelsen (32)	22–19
42	January 21	N Milwaukee	100–92	Clyde Lovellette (20)	23–19
43	January 23	Milwaukee	79–82	Vern Mikkelsen (25)	24–19
44	January 27	N Milwaukee	79–85	Slater Martin (19)	24–20
45	January 29	Fort Wayne	91–100	Clyde Lovellette (30)	25–20
46	January 30	@ Fort Wayne	92–99	Jim Pollard (18)	25–21
47	February 2	N New York	81–96	Jim Pollard (22)	26–21
48	February 3	New York	83–90	Vern Mikkelsen (23)	27–21
49	February 5	N Milwaukee	103–87	Vern Mikkelsen (22)	28–21
50	February 6	Milwaukee	101–99	Clyde Lovellette (30)	28–22
51	February 8	@ New York	95–98	Clyde Lovellette (27)	28–23
52	February 9	N New York	118–112	Slater Martin (19)	28–24
53	February 10	@ Syracuse	81–85	Clyde Lovellette (26)	28–25
54	February 12	@ Rochester	96–95	Clyde Lovellette (25)	29–25
55	February 13	Philadelphia	93–103	Clyde Lovellette (20)	30–25
56	February 19	Fort Wayne	92–98	Clyde Lovellette (24)	31–25
57	February 20	Rochester	92–105	Whitey Skoog (23)	32–25
58	February 21	N Rochester	110–112	Clyde Lovellette (26)	33–25
59	February 23	N Fort Wayne	97–120	Slater Martin (17)	33–26
60	February 24	Boston	98–112	Clyde Lovellette (23)	34–26
61	February 25	N Boston	104–107	Whitey Skoog (31)	34–27
62	February 26	Fort Wayne	90–89	Martin, Mikkelsen (19)	34–28
63	February 27	Rochester	84–93	Dick Schnittker (22)	35–28
64	February 28	N Fort Wayne	88–90	Whitey Skoog (17)	35–29
65	March 3	N Rochester	83–76	Vern Mikkelsen (21)	35–30
66	March 4	@ Boston	121–106	Slater Martin (26)	36–30
67	March 5	@ Rochester	107–104 (OT)	Clyde Lovellette (30)	37–30
68	March 6	Milwaukee	100–98	Vern Mikkelsen (22)	37–31
69	March 7	N New York	96–97	Dick Schnittker (20)	38–31
70	March 9	@ Philadelphia	89–102	Vern Mikkelsen (23)	38–32
71	March 10	N Syracuse	93–96	Clyde Lovellette (27)	39–32
72	March 12	N Philadelphia	78–86	Vern Mikkelsen (20)	40–32

== Playoffs ==
1955 playoff game log
Division semifinals: 2–1 (home: 2–0; road: 0–1)

Game	Date	Team	Score	High points	Location Attendance	Series
1	March 16	Rochester	W 82–78	Clyde Lovellette (26)	St. Paul Auditorium; 4,841	1–0
2	March 18	@ Rochester	L 92–94	Clyde Lovellette (19)	Edgerton Park Arena	1–1
3	March 19	Rochester	W 119–110	Jim Pollard (26)	St. Paul Auditorium; 4,219	2–1

Division finals: 1–3 (home: 1–1; road: 0–2)

Game	Date	Team	Score	High points	Location	Series
1	March 20	@ Fort Wayne	L 79–96	Clyde Lovellette (18)	North Side Gymnasium	0–1
2	March 22	@ Fort Wayne	L 97–98 (OT)	Whitey Skoog (24)	Butler Fieldhouse	0–2
3	March 23	Fort Wayne	W 99–91 (OT)	Whitey Skoog (24)	Minneapolis Auditorium	1–2
4	March 27	Fort Wayne	L 96–105	Clyde Lovellette (25)	Minneapolis Auditorium	1–3

1955 schedule

== Awards and records ==
- Vern Mikkelsen, All-NBA Second Team
- Slater Martin, All-NBA Second Team
- Vern Mikkelsen, NBA All-Star Game
- Slater Martin, NBA All-Star Game
- Jim Pollard, NBA All-Star Game
