= Page City, Kansas =

Unincorporated community in Logan County, Kansas

- Unincorporated community
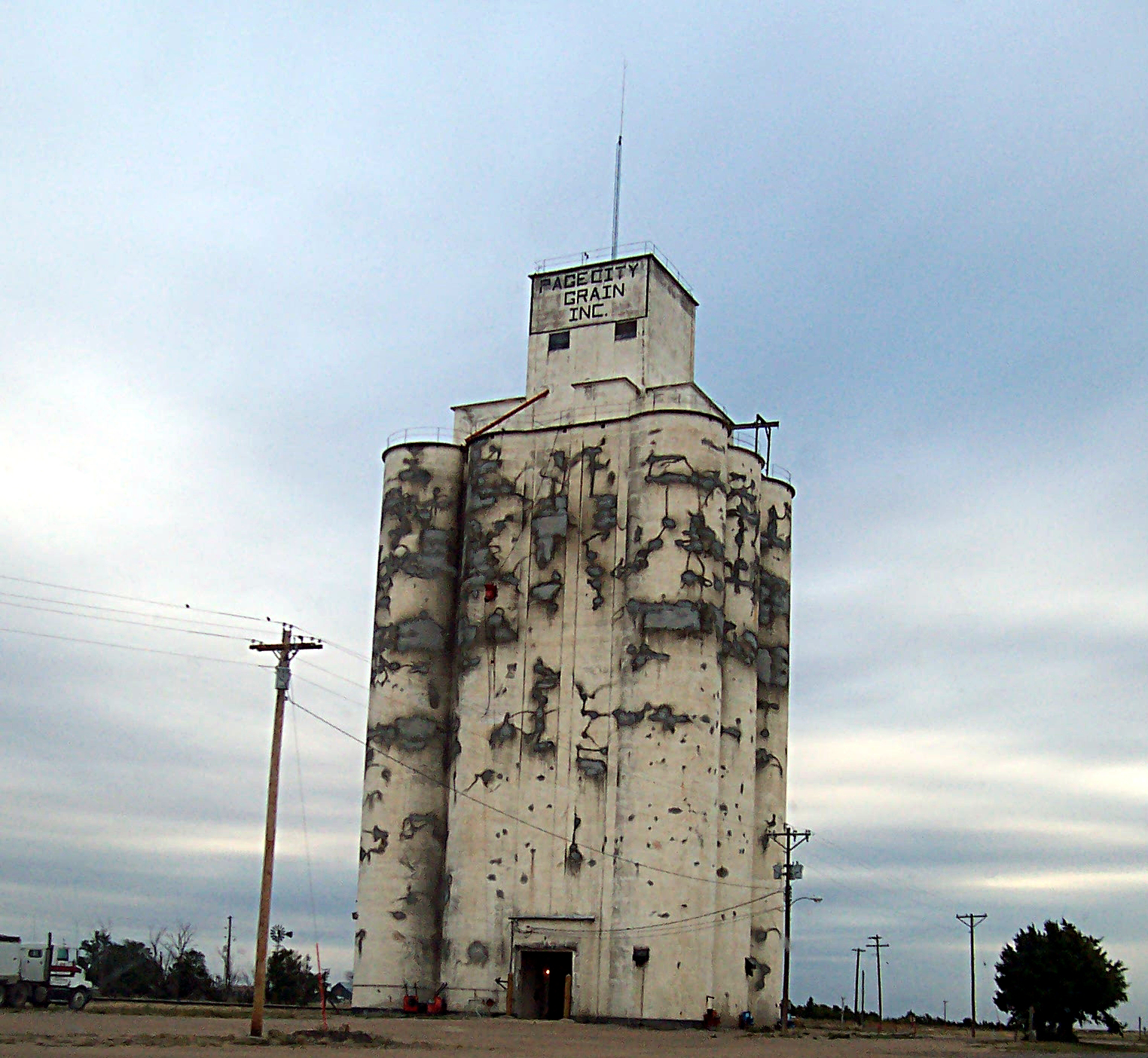
- Page City Grain elevator (2005)

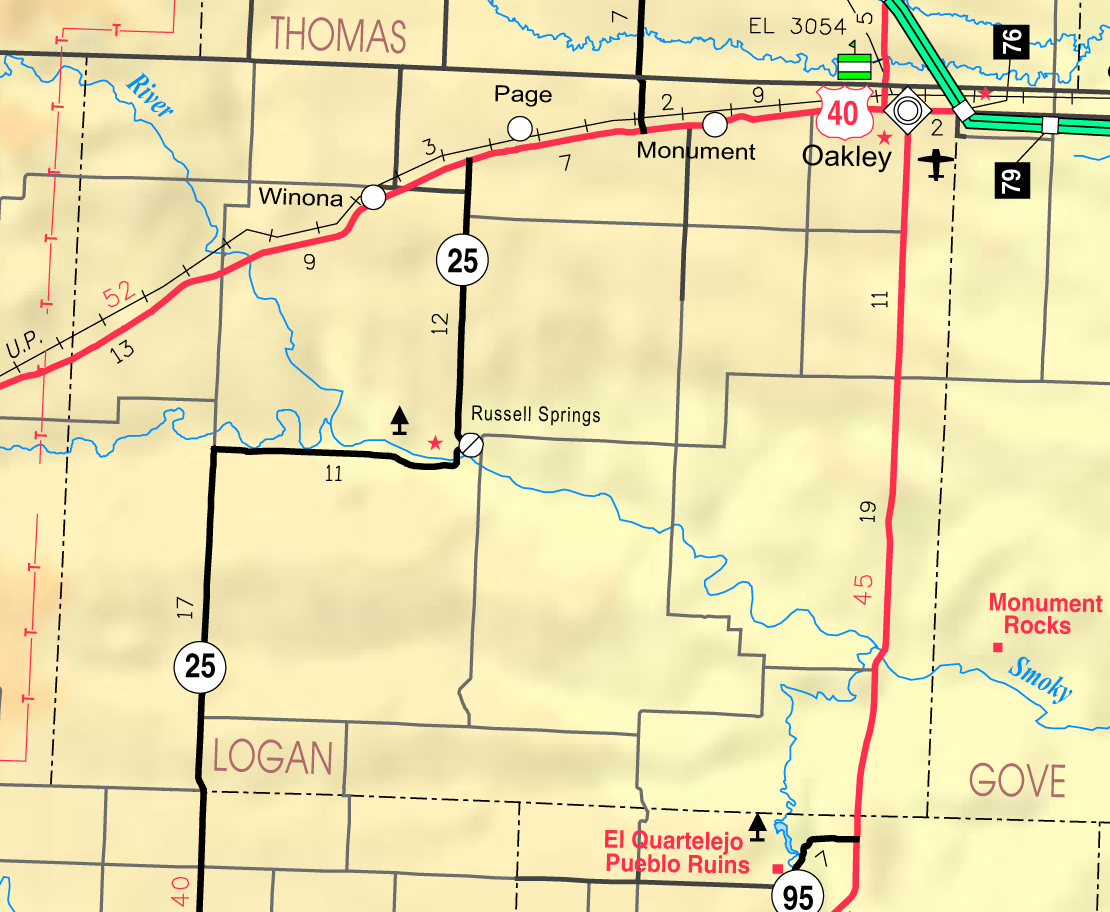
- KDOT map of Logan County (legend)

- Location within Kansas Location within the United States
- Country: United States
- State: Kansas
- County: Logan
- Elevation: 3,235 ft (986 m)
- Time zone: UTC-6 (CST)
  - Summer (DST): UTC-5 (CDT)
- Area code: 785
- FIPS code: 20-54050
- GNIS ID: 471335

Page City is an unincorporated community in Logan County, Kansas, United States. It is located along U.S. Route 40 west of Oakley.

== History ==
The community was founded in 1884 as a depot on the Union Pacific Railroad.

A post office was opened in Page City in 1887, and remained in operation until it was discontinued in 1971.

== Transportation ==
U.S. Route 40 highway and Union Pacific Railroad pass through Page City.
