= 1954–55 NBA season =

Ninth NBA season

- League: National Basketball Association
- Sport: Basketball
- Duration: October 30, 1954 – March 14, 1955; March 15–27, 1955 (Playoffs); March 31 – April 10, 1955 (Finals)
- Games: 72
- Teams: 8 (9)^{note}
- TV partner: NBC

Draft
- Top draft pick: Frank Selvy
- Picked by: Baltimore Bullets

Regular season
- Season champions: Syracuse Nationals
- Top seed: Fort Wayne Pistons
- Top scorer: Neil Johnston (Philadelphia)

Playoffs
- Eastern champions: Syracuse Nationals
- Eastern runners-up: Boston Celtics
- Western champions: Fort Wayne Pistons
- Western runners-up: Minneapolis Lakers

Finals
- Champions: Syracuse Nationals
- Runners-up: Fort Wayne Pistons

NBA seasons
- ← 1953–54 1955–56 →

The 1954–55 NBA season was the ninth season of the National Basketball Association. The season ended with the Syracuse Nationals winning the NBA championship, beating the Fort Wayne Pistons 4 games to 3 in the NBA Finals.

== Notable occurrences ==
- In response to the relatively slow pace of games, the NBA introduced a 24-second shot clock. The shot clock revitalized the game and scoring skyrocketed league-wide.
- The NBA would also adopt the rule of allowing teams to shoot what would be deemed as a "penalty shot" (which later would be fixed up into being two free-throws) after a team gets into a fifth foul in any one quarter (or overtime period).
- The Baltimore Bullets dropped out of the NBA and folded on November 27, 1954, after playing 14 games (record 3 wins 11 losses), the last time as of 2026, that an NBA franchise has folded; these games and all statistics were deleted from the NBA's records. The NBA would return to Baltimore when the Chicago Zephyrs relocated there as the "new" Bullets for the 1963–64 season, though the franchise would relocate to Washington in 1973, where they remain today as the Washington Wizards.
- As a result of Baltimore having folded, the NBA schedule was redrafted so each team now played 12 games against divisional opponents, and 9 games against the four teams in the other division, for a total of 72 games.
- The 1955 NBA All-Star Game was played in New York City, with the East beating the West 100–91. Bill Sharman of the Boston Celtics won the game's MVP award.
- NBC began televising NBA games. This continued until the 1962–63 season, when ABC took over. NBC would begin televising NBA games again in 1990.
- The Milwaukee Hawks played their final season in the Wisconsin city before moving to St. Louis, Missouri the following season. The NBA would return to Milwaukee with the expansion Bucks in 1968.

Coaching changes
Offseason
Team	1953–54 coach	1954–55 coach
Fort Wayne Pistons	Paul Birch	Charles Eckman
In-season
Team	Outgoing coach	Incoming coach
Baltimore Bullets*	Clair Bee*	Albert Barthelme*

* – Would later be expunged from official NBA records following the folding of the original Baltimore Bullets franchise.

== Final standings ==
=== Eastern Division ===
Eastern Division	W	L	PCT	GB	Home	Road	Neutral	Div
x-Syracuse Nationals	43	29	.597	–	25–7	10–17	8–5	21–15
x-New York Knicks	38	34	.528	5	17–9	8–17	13–8	15–21
x-Boston Celtics	36	36	.500	7	21–5	4–22	11–9	19–17
Philadelphia Warriors	33	39	.458	10	14–5	6–20	13–14	17–19

=== Western Division ===
Western Division	W	L	PCT	GB	Home	Road	Neutral	Div
x-Fort Wayne Pistons	43	29	.597	–	21–6	9–14	13–9	28–8
x-Minneapolis Lakers	40	32	.556	3	18–6	10–14	12–12	18–18
x-Rochester Royals	29	43	.403	14	17–11	4–19	8–13	14–22
Milwaukee Hawks	26	46	.361	17	6–11	9–16	11–19	14–22

x – clinched playoff spot

NOTE: The Baltimore Bullets folded with a 3–11 record, with their games deleted from records and the 72-game schedule rewritten. The standings with the games included are as below.

Eastern Division	W	L	PCT	GB	Home	Road	Neutral	Div
Syracuse Nationals	44	29	.603	–	25–7	11–17	8–5	22–15
New York Knicks	39	35	.527	5.5	18–9	8–18	13–8	16–22
Boston Celtics	38	36	.514	6.5	22–5	5–22	11–9	21–17
Philadelphia Warriors	34	39	.466	10	14–5	6–20	14–14	18–19
Baltimore Bullets	3	11	.214	11.5	2–4	1–4	0–3	1–5

Western Division	W	L	PCT	GB	Home	Road	Neutral	Div
Fort Wayne Pistons	45	29	.608	–	22–6	10–14	13–9	28–8
Minneapolis Lakers	43	33	.566	3	19–6	10–15	14–12	18–18
Rochester Royals	30	43	.411	14.5	18–11	4–19	8–13	14–22
Milwaukee Hawks	26	47	.356	18.5	6–11	9–17	11–19	14–22

== Playoffs ==
Division Semifinals
E3	Boston	2
E2	New York	1
W3	Rochester	1
W2	Minneapolis	2

Division Finals
Eastern Division
E1	Syracuse*	3
E3	Boston	1
Western Division
W1	Fort Wayne*	3
W2	Minneapolis	1

NBA Finals
E1	Syracuse*	4
W1	Fort Wayne*	3

- * Division winner
- Bold Series winner
- Italic Team with home-court advantage in NBA Finals

== Statistics leaders ==
Category	Player	Team	Stat
Points	Neil Johnston	Philadelphia Warriors	1,631
Rebounds	Neil Johnston	Philadelphia Warriors	1,085
Assists	Bob Cousy	Boston Celtics	557
FG%	Larry Foust	Fort Wayne Pistons	.487
FT%	Bill Sharman	Boston Celtics	.897

Note: Prior to the 1969–70 season, league leaders in points, rebounds, and assists were determined by totals rather than averages.

== NBA awards ==
- Rookie of the Year: Bob Pettit, Milwaukee Hawks
- All-NBA First Team:
  - Neil Johnston, Philadelphia Warriors
  - Dolph Schayes, Syracuse Nationals
  - Bob Cousy, Boston Celtics
  - Bob Pettit, Milwaukee Hawks
  - Larry Foust, Fort Wayne Pistons
- All-NBA Second Team:
  - Harry Gallatin, New York Knicks
  - Slater Martin, Minneapolis Lakers
  - Vern Mikkelsen, Minneapolis Lakers
  - Paul Seymour, Syracuse Nationals
  - Bill Sharman, Boston Celtics

== See also ==
- List of NBA regular season records
