= 1947–48 Chicago Stags season =

- Head coach: Harold Olsen
- Arena: Chicago Stadium

Results
- Record: 28–20 (.583)
- Place: Division: 3rd (Western)
- Playoff finish: Lost BAA Semifinals
- Stats at Basketball Reference

Local media
- Television: WBKB
- Radio: WIND

The 1947–48 BAA season was the Stags' second season in the Basketball Association of America (later known as the NBA). During this season only, a vast majority of the Stags' home games would actually have the Stags' match-up be considered the main headliner for what would become a unique arrangement between the Basketball Association of America and the older National Basketball League where for 24 games of the season (starting on November 15, 1947 and ending on March 18, 1948), the Stags would agree to host an official NBL match involving one of their eleven teams as the headliner match-up of a doubleheader series agreed upon for that specific night before the Stags would play their official BAA-scheduled home match-up against one of the seven remaining BAA teams (the ABL-added Baltimore Bullets alongside the Boston Celtics, New York Knickerbockers, Philadelphia Warriors, Providence Steamrollers, St. Louis Bombers, and Washington Capitols) that entered the league's second season of existence. While the agreement was made to look for both leagues to have financial stability throughout the season and look for an eventual agreement with each other following the NBL's defending-champion Chicago American Gears defecting from that league to create their own short-lived, rivaling professional basketball league called the Professional Basketball League of America (PBLA), the agreement plans between the two leagues would ultimately fall apart by the end of the season once the BAA persuaded four of the NBL's teams to switch leagues for the following season of play, which led to the end of the doubleheader series that Chicago held between the NBL and the BAA; the season after that would later see the two leagues merge operations to create the National Basketball Association (NBA), the present successor for both leagues (more so for the BAA than the NBL).

== Draft picks ==
Round	Pick	Player	Position	Nationality	College
1	8	Paul Huston	F	United States	Ohio State
2	18	Ben Schadler	F	United States	Northwestern
3	28	Jimmy Darden	G	United States	Denver
4	38	Gene Vance	G/F	United States	Illinois
5	47	Andy Phillip	G/F	United States	Illinois
6	55	Ralph Bishop	G/F	United States	Washington
7	62	Jim Pollard	F/C	United States	Stanford
8	68	Don Smith	G/F	United States	Minnesota
9	73	Jack Stone	G/F	United States	Kansas State
10	77	Hank Decker	–	United States	West Texas A&M

Despite making it to the inaugural BAA (now NBA) Finals championship series against the Philadelphia Warriors, the Stags admitted to the rest of the league that they alongside the Canadian-based Toronto Huskies were completely unsure of their personal standings on whether they'd be able to play for another season or not (partially due to the perceived competition against the rivaling National Basketball League and their rivaling team in the new defending champions in the Chicago American Gears). Even though they were uncertain about their personal status as a franchise, however, the Stags joined the Huskies in participating in the inaugural 1947 BAA draft, with the Stags later proving that they would be able to play for a few more seasons beyond this one at hand.

== Roster ==
1947–48 Chicago Stags roster
Players

Pos.	No.	Player	Height	Weight	DOB	From
F/C	17	Chuck Gilmur	6 ft 4 in (1.93 m)	225 lb (102 kg)	1922-08-13	Washington
F	3	Paul Huston	6 ft 3 in (1.91 m)	175 lb (79 kg)	1925-06-02	Ohio State
F/C	23	Stan Miasek	6 ft 5 in (1.96 m)	210 lb (95 kg)	1924-08-08	Textile HS (NY)
G/F	19	Andy Phillip	6 ft 2 in (1.88 m)	195 lb (88 kg)	1922-03-07	Illinois
G	15	Gene Rock	5 ft 9 in (1.75 m)	155 lb (70 kg)	1921-11-04	USC
G	6	Mickey Rottner	5 ft 10 in (1.78 m)	180 lb (82 kg)	1919-03-23	Loyola Chicago
F	14	Ben Schadler	6 ft 0 in (1.83 m)	185 lb (84 kg)	1924-03-09	Northwestern
G/F	18	Jim Seminoff	6 ft 2 in (1.88 m)	190 lb (86 kg)	1922-09-01	USC
G/F	12	Gene Vance	6 ft 3 in (1.91 m)	195 lb (88 kg)	1923-02-25	Illinois
SG	10	Max Zaslofsky	6 ft 2 in (1.88 m)	170 lb (77 kg)	1925-12-07	St. John's

Coaches
Head coach

Harold Olsen

Legend
- (DP) Unsigned draft pick
- (FA) Free agent
- (S) Suspended
- Injured

Roster

== Regular season ==
=== Season standings ===
#	Western Division				
#	Team	W	L	PCT	GB
1	x-St. Louis Bombers	29	19	.604	–
2	x-Baltimore Bullets	28	20	.583	1
3	x-Chicago Stags	28	20	.583	1
4	x-Washington Capitols	28	20	.583	1

=== Game log ===
#	Date	Opponent	Score	High points	Record
1	November 13	St. Louis	W 80–70	Andy Phillip (15)	1–0
2	November 15	Baltimore	L 63–67	Stan Miasek (17)	1–1
3	November 19	@ New York	W 81–63	Max Zaslofsky (26)	2–1
4	November 20	Washington	W 81–77	Andy Phillip (20)	3–1
5	November 22	@ Baltimore	L 72–75	Stan Miasek (27)	3–2
6	November 28	Philadelphia	W 75–71	Max Zaslofsky (20)	4–2
7	December 3	Washington	W 81–73	Stan Miasek (25)	5–2
8	December 6	Baltimore	W 73–65	Stan Miasek (24)	6–2
9	December 12	St. Louis	L 75–85	Max Zaslofsky (20)	6–3
10	December 18	Washington	L 64–70	Gene Vance (15)	6–4
11	December 21	Baltimore	W 93–83	Max Zaslofsky (24)	7–4
12	December 23	@ Boston	W 83–75	Max Zaslofsky (24)	8–4
13	December 25	@ Baltimore	L 70–87	Max Zaslofsky (16)	8–5
14	December 27	@ New York	W 79–70	Max Zaslofsky (24)	9–5
15	December 30	@ Providence	W 85–73	Max Zaslofsky (34)	10–5
16	January 3	@ Providence	W 79–76	Max Zaslofsky (20)	11–5
17	January 7	@ New York	W 79–74	Stan Miasek (25)	12–5
18	January 8	@ Baltimore	L 75–78	Stan Miasek (17)	12–6
19	January 9	@ Philadelphia	W 77–60	Max Zaslofsky (35)	13–6
20	January 11	New York	W 99–86	Max Zaslofsky (31)	14–6
21	January 14	@ Washington	L 67–75	Stan Miasek (21)	14–7
22	January 16	@ Boston	L 61–75	Max Zaslofsky (20)	14–8
23	January 18	Boston	W 72–48	Max Zaslofsky (20)	15–8
24	January 22	Providence	L 50–56	Max Zaslofsky (17)	15–9
25	January 27	Baltimore	W 78–74	Max Zaslofsky (28)	16–9
26	January 29	@ St. Louis	L 60–62	Stan Miasek (19)	16–10
27	January 31	@ Washington	L 48–54	Max Zaslofsky (17)	16–11
28	February 1	Philadelphia	L 78–85	Max Zaslofsky (17)	16–12
29	February 5	@ St. Louis	W 77–71	Phillip, Zaslofsky (19)	17–12
30	February 8	Philadelphia	W 80–74 (2OT)	Max Zaslofsky (26)	18–12
31	February 11	St. Louis	L 78–80	Andy Phillip (30)	18–13
32	February 12	@ St. Louis	W 80–74	Max Zaslofsky (27)	19–13
33	February 15	Providence	L 79–85	Max Zaslofsky (24)	19–14
34	February 19	New York	W 82–74	Max Zaslofsky (26)	20–14
35	February 21	@ Providence	W 92–73	Seminoff, Zaslofsky (22)	21–14
36	February 22	@ Boston	W 97–77	Max Zaslofsky (21)	22–14
37	February 25	@ Washington	W 73–66	Stan Miasek (21)	23–14
38	February 26	@ Philadelphia	L 80–89	Andy Phillip (25)	23–15
39	February 27	Boston	W 69–83	Max Zaslofsky (23)	23–16
40	February 29	Washington	W 76–75 (OT)	Max Zaslofsky (28)	24–16
41	March 7	Providence	W 89–81	Max Zaslofsky (40)	25–16
42	March 9	@ Philadelphia	W 93–79	Gilmur, Seminoff (21)	26–16
43	March 10	@ Washington	W 71–54	Max Zaslofsky (28)	27–16
44	March 11	@ Baltimore	L 83–86	Max Zaslofsky (25)	27–17
45	March 13	New York	W 58–51	Max Zaslofsky (22)	28–17
46	March 18	Boston	L 72–77	Max Zaslofsky (19)	28–18
47	March 20	@ St. Louis	L 63–75	Max Zaslofsky (21)	28–19
48	March 21	St. Louis	L 70–82	Max Zaslofsky (24)	28–20

==== BAA-NBL Doubleheader Series ====
This season was the only regular season where a BAA/NBA team would host multiple doubleheader series of games with many other teams from another professional basketball league, in this case, the rivaling National Basketball League. (It would also likely explain where the alternative version of the Basketball Association of America's logo would come from.) As such, all of the games that were played before the Chicago Stags played their regular season games this season, including the Minneapolis Lakers' famous exhibition game against the Harlem Globetrotters, will be displayed here in this case. However, due to the combination of the games all being hosted in the Chicago Stadium (home of the Stags) and the NBL not having their home and road opponents being confirmed to the general public so easily (at least, not as of 2026) due to their matches being considered neutral territory games, recording of scores for each game here will be determined by winning team and losing team with respective team scores shown on each side instead.

#	Date	Winning Team	Score	Losing Team
1A	November 15	Syracuse Nationals	73–72	Tri-Cities Blackhawks
1B	November 15	Baltimore Bullets	67–63	Chicago Stags
2A	December 3	Rochester Royals	72–54	Sheboygan Red Skins
2B	December 3	Chicago Stags	81–73	Washington Capitols
3A	December 6	Minneapolis Lakers	88–67	Anderson Duffey Packers
3B	December 6	Chicago Stags	73–65	Baltimore Bullets
4A	December 12	Fort Wayne Zollner Pistons	60–55	Minneapolis Lakers
4B	December 12	St. Louis Bombers	85–75	Chicago Stags
5A	December 18	Minneapolis Lakers	66–56	Toledo Jeeps
5B	December 18	Washington Capitols	70–64	Chicago Stags
6A	December 21	Rochester Royals	65–50	Oshkosh All-Stars
6B	December 21	Chicago Stags	93–83	Baltimore Bullets
7A	January 18	Oshkosh All-Stars	55–47	Flint/Midland Dow A.C.'s
7B	January 18	Chicago Stags	72–48	Boston Celtics
8A	January 22	Minneapolis Lakers	69–64	Rochester Royals
8B	January 22	Providence Steamrollers	56–50	Chicago Stags
9A	January 27	Tri-Cities Blackhawks	62–50	Flint/Midland Dow A.C.'s
9B	January 27	Chicago Stags	78–74	Baltimore Bullets
10A	February 11	Indianapolis Kautskys	57–53	Syracuse Nationals
10B	February 11	St. Louis Bombers	80–78	Chicago Stags
11A	February 15	Syracuse Nationals	75–62	Oshkosh All-Stars
11B	February 15	Providence Steamrollers	85–79	Chicago Stags
12A	February 19	Harlem Globetrotters	61–59	Minneapolis Lakers
12B	February 19	Chicago Stags	82–74	New York Knicks
13A	February 27	Anderson Duffey Packers	71–46	Sheboygan Red Skins
13B	February 27	Boston Celtics	83–69	Chicago Stags
14A	February 29	Minneapolis Lakers	66–56	Syracuse Nationals
14B	February 29	Chicago Stags	76–75 (OT)	Washington Capitols
15A	March 7	Rochester Royals	61–46	Indianapolis Kautskys
15B	March 7	Chicago Stags	89–81	Providence Steamrollers
16A	March 13	Tri-Cities Blackhawks	61–55	Toledo Jeeps
16B	March 13	Chicago Stags	58–51	New York Knicks
17A	March 18	Indianapolis Kautskys	79–45	Flint/Midland Dow A.C.'s
17B	March 18	Boston Celtics	77–72	Chicago Stags

For the other seven games involved in the NBL's part of the doubleheader series with the BAA in Chicago, it's likely that the NBL's games in question were exhibition games played against either their own teams in the NBL (which would explain why the final results weren't officially recorded for the NBL's season) or were against other teams like the Harlem Globetrotters during this season.

== BAA Playoffs ==
=== BAA Western Division Tiebreaker Series Match-Ups ===
Chicago Stags vs. Washington Capitols: Stags win series 1-0

- Game 1 @ Chicago (March 23): Chicago 74, Washington 70

Chicago Stags vs. Baltimore Bullets: Bullets win series 1-0

- Game 1 @ Chicago (March 25): Baltimore 75, Chicago 72

=== BAA Quarterfinals ===
(E3) Boston Celtics vs. (W3) Chicago Stags: Stags win series 2-1

- Game 1 @ Boston (March 28): Chicago 79, Boston 72
- Game 2 @ Boston (March 31): Boston 81, Chicago 77
- Game 3 @ Boston (April 2): Chicago 81, Boston 74

=== BAA Semifinals ===
(W2) Baltimore Bullets vs. (W3) Chicago Stags: Bullets win series 2-0

- Game 1 @ Chicago (April 7): Baltimore 73, Chicago 67
- Game 2 @ Baltimore (April 8): Baltimore 89, Chicago 72

== Transactions ==
=== Sales ===
Player	Date sold	New team
Kenny Sailors	November, 1947	Philadelphia Warriors
