= 1947–48 Oshkosh All-Stars season =

NBL professional basketball team season

- Head coach: Lon Darling
- General manager: Lon Darling
- Owner: Lon Darling
- Arena: South Park School Gymnasium

Results
- Record: 29–31 (.483)
- Place: Division: 3rd (Western)
- Playoff finish: Lost Western Division opening round to Minneapolis Lakers, 3–1

The 1947–48 Oshkosh All-Stars season was the All-Stars' eleventh year in the United States' National Basketball League (NBL), which was also the eleventh year of the league's existence. However, if one were to include the independent seasons they played starting all the way back in 1929 before beginning their NBL tenure in 1937, this would officially be their eighteenth season of play. Eleven teams would end up competing in the NBL this season due to both the defending NBL champion Chicago American Gears defecting from the league to create their own short-lived rival professional basketball league called the Professional Basketball League of America (while not being allowed back in through unanimous voting later on) and the Youngstown Bears folding operations in exchange for the Flint Dow A.C.'s (later known as the Flint/Midland Dow A.C.'s by most people due to them having home venue issues up in Flint, Michigan and looking to return to their original home venue in Midland, Michigan back when they originally were the Midland Dow Chemicals works team being owned and operated by the Dow Chemical Company) taking on their spot in the league (alongside the Detroit Gems moving to Minneapolis to become the Minneapolis Lakers). As a result of these changes, only five teams would compete in the Eastern Division (with one of them being a former Western Division team in question), while six teams (including the All-Stars) competing in the Western Division this season. The All-Stars played their home games at the South Park School Gymnasium in the South Park Middle School within the Oshkosh Area School District, which would start proving to be detrimental to the team's long-term survival during this season due, in part, to how many neutral-hosted games they held while playing within the state of Wisconsin this time around.

Unlike the previous season they played, the All-Stars would start this season playing rather poorly due, in part, to the growing display of talent within the NBL. However, by the time Oshkosh were nearing the end of January, they would not only adjust themselves to the improved talents within the NBL, but also get themselves an above-average record and would have a better shot at one of the four playoff spots available for the season, The All-Stars, however, finished the season with a below-average 29–31 record and finish in third place. They finished ahead of both the cityside rivals Sheboygan Red Skins and the surprising Indianapolis Kautskys playoff team, but behind the average Tri-Cities Blackhawks and the division-leading Minneapolis Lakers. Unfortunately for Oshkosh, the Minneapolis squad would showcase their commanding presence as a team early and quickly in this series (thanks in part due to new star center George Mikan, whom they acquired through a dispersal draft earlier in the season). This led to the Lakers eliminating the All-Stars in a quick 3–1 series, in the only series Oshkosh would ever see, Minneapolis eventually saw the Lakers be crowned the newest NBL (and WPBT) champions not long afterward. None of the All-Stars' players would receive any honors from the NBL Lautenbach were noted to be named a part of the NBL's All-Rookie Honorable Mention Team). Following this season's conclusion, both the Oshkosh All-Stars and the Toledo Jeeps would attempt to join (and ultimately fail) the Fort Wayne Zollner Pistons, the Indianapolis Kautskys, the new NBL champion Minneapolis Lakers, and the runners-up to the Lakers in the Rochester Royals. In moving out of the older NBL and into the younger yet newly rivaling Basketball Association of America (with Oshkosh's perceived failures likely stemming from venue issues because the South Park School Gymnasium could only hold a total of 1,500 people at a time). Because of the sudden betrayal/departure and the subsequent folding of both the Toledo Jeeps and the Flint/Midland Dow A.C.'s franchises, the NBL would see only five teams from this season (the Anderson Duffey Packers works team, the Oshkosh All-Stars, the Sheboygan Red Skins, the Syracuse Nationals, and the Tri-Cities Blackhawks) remain for what would later become the NBL's final season of existence.

== Draft picks ==
The Oshkosh All-Stars would participate in the 1947 NBL draft, which occurred right after the 1947 BAA draft due to a joint agreement the National Basketball League and the rivaling Basketball Association of America had with each other during the offseason period. However, as of 2026, no records of what the All-Stars' draft picks might have been for the NBL have properly come up, with any information on who those selections might have been being lost to time in the process.

== Roster ==
1947–48 Oshkosh All-Stars roster
Players

Pos.	No.	Player	Height	Weight	DOB	From
F/C		Bob Carpenter	6 ft 5 in (1.96 m)	200 lb (91 kg)	1917–11–06	East Texas A&M
C		Leroy Edwards	6 ft 5 in (1.96 m)	210 lb (95 kg)	1914–04–11	Kentucky
F/C		Gene Englund	6 ft 5 in (1.96 m)	205 lb (93 kg)	1917–10–21	Wisconsin
G/F		Bill Hapac	6 ft 2 in (1.88 m)	190 lb (86 kg)	1918–01–26	Illinois
G/F		Walt Lautenbach	6 ft 2 in (1.88 m)	185 lb (84 kg)	1922–11–17	Wisconsin
F		Jack Maddox	6 ft 3 in (1.91 m)	185 lb (84 kg)	1919–12–10	West Texas State
G/F		Bill McDonald	6 ft 3 in (1.91 m)	190 lb (86 kg)	1916–11–05	Marquette
G/F		Fred Rehm	6 ft 2 in (1.88 m)	195 lb (88 kg)	1921–05–18	Wisconsin
G/F		Eddie Riska	6 ft 0 in (1.83 m)	175 lb (79 kg)	1919–10–04	Notre Dame
G		Abel Rodrigues	6 ft 2 in (1.88 m)	182 lb (83 kg)	1922–01–16	Salinas Junior College
G		Ted Scalissi	5 ft 8 in (1.73 m)	160 lb (73 kg)	1921–10–26	Ripon
G/F		Glen Selbo	6 ft 3 in (1.91 m)	196 lb (89 kg)	1926–03–29	Wisconsin
G/F		Bob Sullivan	6 ft 0 in (1.83 m)	180 lb (82 kg)	1921–07–01	Wisconsin
F/C		Floyd Volker	6 ft 4 in (1.93 m)	205 lb (93 kg)	1921–06–21	Wyoming
C		Clint Wager	6 ft 6 in (1.98 m)	210 lb (95 kg)	1920–01–20	Saint Mary's (MN)

Coaches
Head coach
- Lon Darling

Legend
- (DP) Unsigned draft pick
- (FA) Free agent
- (S) Suspended
- Injured

Roster

Note: Bill McDonald, Abel Rodrigues, Ted Scalissi, and Bob Sullivan were not a part of the playoff roster for this season.

== Regular season ==
=== Season standings ===
Pos.	Western Division	Wins	Losses	Win %
1	Minneapolis Lakers	43	17	.717
2	Tri-Cities Blackhawks	30	30	.500
3	Oshkosh All-Stars	29	31	.483
4	Indianapolis Kautskys	24	35	.407
5	Sheboygan Red Skins	23	37	.383

=== NBL Schedule ===
Not to be confused with exhibition or other non-NBL scheduled games that did not count towards Oshkosh's official NBL record for this season. An official database created by John Grasso detailing every NBL match possible (outside of two matches that the Kankakee Gallagher Trojans won over the Dayton Metropolitans in 1938) would be released in 2026 showcasing every team's official schedules throughout their time spent in the NBL. As such, these are the official results recorded for the Oshkosh All-Stars during their eleventh season in the NBL.

#	Date	Opponent	Score	Record
1	November 1	Minneapolis	47–49	0–1
2	November 3	@ Anderson	56–71	0–2
3	November 4	@ Indianapolis	65–58	1–2
4	November 8	Toledo	60–61	1–3
5	November 11	@ Rochester	68–78	1–4
6	November 13	@ Syracuse	59–65	1–5
7	November 14	@ Syracuse	56–46	2–5
8	November 15	@ Rochester	52–79	2–6
9	November 20	N Toledo	59–43	3–6
10	November 22	Flint	66–53	4–6
11	November 23	@ Flint	66–72	4–7
12	November 26	Rochester	47–43	5–7
13	November 29	Anderson	69–59	6–7
14	December 1	N Sheboygan	53–59	6–8
15	December 6	Tri-Cities	60–50	7–8
16	December 7	Minneapolis	44–38	8–8
17	December 9	@ Tri-Cities	56–57	8–9
18	December 13	Minneapolis	57–67	8–10
19	December 18	@ Sheboygan	48–59	8–11
20	December 20	Indianapolis	57–47	9–11
21	December 21	N Rochester	50–65	9–12
22	December 27	Sheboygan	51–49	10–12
23	December 28	@ Fort Wayne	41–51	10–13
24	January 3	Flint	58–47	11–13
25	January 7	Fort Wayne	59–61	11–14
26	January 10	Anderson	58–52	12–14
27	January 11	Flint	79–52	13–14
28	January 12	@ Anderson	58–71	13–15
29	January 14	Anderson	64–67	13–16
30	January 15	@ Sheboygan	45–43	14–16
31	January 17	Indianapolis	91–58	15–16
32	January 18	N Flint/Midland	55–47	16–16
33	January 24	Sheboygan	58–54	17–16
34	January 25	@ Tri-Cities	76–74 (OT)	18–16
35	January 27	@ Indianapolis	65–69	18–17
36	January 28	@ Tri-Cities	73–54	19–17
37	February 1	@ Sheboygan	64–65	19–18
38	February 3	N Anderson	61–72	19–19
39	February 5	@ Tri-Cities	65–70	19–20
40	February 7	@ Rochester	54–63	19–21
41	February 8	@ Minneapolis	56–78	19–22
42	February 10	N Rochester	51–40	20–22
43	February 12	N Indianapolis	64–67	20–23
44	February 14	Indianapolis	70–48	21–23
45	February 15	N Syracuse	62–75	21–24
46	February 16	@ Flint/Midland (Midland)	61–63	21–25
47	February 17	@ Toledo	70–68 (2OT)	22–25
48	February 18	Syracuse	77–65	23–25
49	February 20	N Syracuse	80–87	23–26
50	February 21	Syracuse	62–58	24–26
51	February 22	@ Minneapolis	58–85	24–27
52	February 25	Fort Wayne	58–57 (OT)	25–27
53	February 28	Toledo	64–59 (OT)	26–27
54	March 3	@ Fort Wayne	45–59	26–28
55	March 6	Minneapolis	65–69	26–29
56	March 10	Tri-Cities	68–56	27–29
57	March 14	@ Fort Wayne	46–62	27–30
58	March 15	@ Toledo	47–43	28–30
59	March 16	@ Toledo	50–53	28–31
60	March 20	Fort Wayne	58–42	29–31

== NBL Playoffs ==
=== NBL Western Division Opening Round ===
(3W) Oshkosh All-Stars vs. (1W) Minneapolis Lakers: Minneapolis wins series 3–1

- Game 1: March 23, 1948 @ Minneapolis: Minneapolis 80, Oshkosh 68
- Game 2: March 24, 1948 @ Minneapolis: Minneapolis 88, Oshkosh 65
- Game 3: March 26, 1948 @ Oshkosh: Oshkosh 69, Minneapolis 51
- Game 4: March 27, 1948 @ Oshkosh: Minneapolis 61, Oshkosh 55

=== Awards and honors ===
- NBL All-Time Team – Bob Carpenter, Leroy Edwards, and Gene Englund
