= 1947–48 Sheboygan Red Skins season =

NBL professional basketball team season

- Head coach: Doxie Moore (6–5); Bobby McDermott (player-coach; 3–4); Doxie Moore (14–28)
- General manager: Doxie Moore
- Arena: Sheboygan Municipal Auditorium and Armory

Results
- Record: 23–37 (.383)
- Place: Division: 5th (Western)
- Playoff finish: Did not qualify

The 1947–48 Sheboygan Red Skins season was the Red Skins' tenth year in the United States' National Basketball League (NBL), which would also be the eleventh year the NBL itself existed. However, if one were to include their few seasons they played as an independent team under a few various team names involving local businesses like the The Ballhorns (being sponsored by a local florist and funeral parlor), the Art Imigs (being sponsored by a local dry cleaning shop owned and operated by a man named Art Imig with team jerseys saying Art Imig's), and the Enzo Jels (being sponsored by a local gelatin manufacturer known as Enzo-Pac) at various points before becoming the Sheboygan Red Skins due to their promotion up into the NBL, this would officially be their fifteenth overall season of play as well. Entering this season, the NBL had only eleven teams competing this time around due to the previous NBL champions in the Chicago American Gears leaving the NBL to create their own ambitious rivaling professional basketball league called the Professional Basketball League of America (which ultimately was short-lived) and the Flint/Midland Dow A.C.'s (who had initially planned to enter the previous NBL season as the Midland Dow Chemicals works team for the Dow Chemical Company before being held back for a season due to them failing to submit their necessary paperwork on time) replacing the Youngstown Bears for the season. As such, the Red Skins would compete in the Western Division for the fourth straight season in a row (sixth season overall), with the NBL being composed of six Eastern Division teams (including the Dow A.C.'s team that moved from Flint to Midland, Michigan during this season) and five Western Division teams (Sheboygan's division) this time around.

The Red Skins played their home games at the Sheboygan Municipal Auditorium and Armory. Early on in their season, Sheboygan was struggling to keep up with the rest of the competition, even after they had acquired star guard Bobby McDermott from the Chicago American Gears following the dispersal draft the NBL had done once the PBLA had gone bankrupt early into the NBL's season, due in part to the retirement of long-time contributing (and at times, star) player Rube Lautenschlager. Following a December 1 victory where the Red Skins went 6–5 in the season, head coach Doxie Moore had agreed to be the team's general manager only while McDermott took on the role of player-coach for the team. Unfortunately for McDermott, he would only last for seven total games under that newly designated role (going 3–4) before Moore returned to being the permanent head coach once again for the rest of the season alongside being the team's general manager, while McDermott was later sold off to the Tri-Cities Blackhawks for the rest of the season after playing only 17 games with Sheboygan due to him and Moore constantly going up against each other. Once the team lost McDermott's presence, that would essentially spell doom for the Red Skins' season (despite them looking like they'd be the last Western Division playoff team to enter for that spot at times for most of the season due to the Indianapolis Kautskys dealing with their own struggles this season both from a team and financial standpoint), as despite Sheboygan having $60,000 spent upon their team roster this season (which would become a talking point in the NBL not having peace with the newly-rivaling Basketball Association of America in the following season after this one, which subsequently became the final seasons of play for both of those leagues under their respective names), the Red Skins would follow up an average finish to the 1948 year (through a 12–12 record by the end of December) with a below-average January for a 16–21 record that would only get worse for them the further their season went on. As a matter of fact, Sheboygan would only gain four more victories in the month of February and three more victories throughout the month of March to finish their season with a 23–37 record to finish dead last in the Western Division (with the struggling Indianapolis Kautskys managing to get a late-season surge to have a one and a half game lead over the Red Skins for the final playoff spot), thus having Sheboygan failing to qualify for the NBL Playoffs for the first time since 1942 back when divisions were non-existent at the time. Despite the team's failure to succeed this season, the Red Skins would still see another rookie win the NBL's Rookie of the Year Award for the third and final time in league history (the most times out of any NBL team in question, albeit his victory was done in a very close manner over the Minneapolis Lakers' Jim Pollard), as well as be named a member of the All-NBL First Team, while Bobby McDermott would earn his final All-NBL Team honors with an All-NBL Second Team spot despite spending most of his season with the Tri-Cities Blackhawks instead of with Sheboygan.

Following this season's conclusion, NBL commissioner Ward Lambert would end up resigning from his position in the NBL, due not just to inconsistent problems at hand under his leadership, but also due to him allowing for four major teams that were important to the NBL's success (the Fort Wayne Zollner Pistons, the Indianapolis Kautskys, the newest NBL champions in the Minneapolis Lakers, and the runners-up to the Lakers in the Rochester Royals) to defect from the NBL to their newest rivaling league in the Basketball Association of America, with two other NBL teams in the cityside rivaling Oshkosh All-Stars and the Toledo Jeeps attempting to join them as well before failing on their ends for reasons mostly considered unknown in a public manner (though they might have related to venue issues). The NBL then had to decide upon whether to have the University of Minnesota's director of competitive athletics in Chet Roan or Sheboygan's general manager and head coach in Doxie Moore take on the role of being the new NBL commissioner for the upcoming season. Despite Moore not being perceived as likely to be named the new NBL commissioner at the time due to him being viewed unfavorably not just in Sheboygan, but also in two other places that held NBL teams as well (though the actual places that viewed Moore unfavorably were never specified), Doxie Moore would ultimately become the newest (and final) commissioner of the NBL, with him moving the league's headquarters from Chicago to West Lafayette, Indiana in order to help decrease costs along the way. The NBL's decision to have Moore become the newest commissioner of the league led to the Sheboygan Red Skins looking for new replacements for both the general manager and head coaching roles for the team's upcoming season, which they later solved with having Magnus Brinkman taking on the general manager role and guard Ken Suesens becoming the player-coach of the team for what would become the team's final season in the NBL. Following these massive changes at hand, the departure of four of the NBL's teams alongside seeing both the Toledo Jeeps and the Flint/Midland Dow A.C.'s folding operations entirely led to Sheboygan joining their cityside rivals in the Oshkosh All-Stars, the Anderson Duffey Packers works team, the Syracuse Nationals, and the Tri-Cities Blackhawks as the only five remaining teams from this season to compete in the final NBL season ever played.

== Draft picks ==
The Sheboygan Red Skins would participate in the 1947 NBL draft, which occurred right after the 1947 BAA draft due to a joint agreement the National Basketball League and the rivaling Basketball Association of America had with each other during the offseason period. However, as of 2026, no records of what the Red Skins' draft picks might have been for the NBL have properly come up, with any information on who those selections might have been being lost to time in the process.

== Roster ==
1947–48 Sheboygan Red Skins roster
Players

Pos.	No.	Player	Height	Weight	DOB	From
G/F		Bob Bolyard	6 ft 0 in (1.83 m)	182 lb (83 kg)	1920–12–04	Toledo
G/F		Paul Cloyd	6 ft 2 in (1.88 m)	180 lb (82 kg)	1920–06–13	Wisconsin
C		Ed Dancker	6 ft 7 in (2.01 m)	200 lb (91 kg)	1914–03–14	South Division HS (WI)
F/C		Les Deaton	6 ft 4 in (1.93 m)	210 lb (95 kg)	1923–09–23	Simpson
C		Bob Dykstra	6 ft 9 in (2.06 m)	230 lb (104 kg)	1922–05–31	Simpson
G/F		Jack Forestieri	6 ft 0 in (1.83 m)	185 lb (84 kg)	1927–08–12	Notre Dame
G/F		Fred Gantt	6 ft 3 in (1.91 m)	170 lb (77 kg)	1922–11–27	Richmond
G		Cecil Hankins	6 ft 1 in (1.85 m)	175 lb (79 kg)	1922–01–06	Oklahoma State
G/F		Luther Harris	6 ft 3 in (1.91 m)	195 lb (88 kg)	1923–08–27	East Alton–Wood River HS (IL)
G/F		Fred Lewis	6 ft 2 in (1.88 m)	195 lb (88 kg)	1921–01–06	Eastern Kentucky
G/F		Al Lucas	6 ft 3 in (1.91 m)	195 lb (88 kg)	1922–07–04	Fordham
G		Bobby McDermott	5 ft 11 in (1.80 m)	180 lb (82 kg)	1914–01–07	Flushing HS (NY)
F/C		Max Morris	6 ft 2 in (1.88 m)	195 lb (88 kg)	1925–03–13	Northwestern
G		Ken Suesens	6 ft 1 in (1.85 m)	175 lb (79 kg)	1916–10–23	Iowa
G/F		Milt Ticco	6 ft 3 in (1.91 m)	190 lb (86 kg)	1922–09–22	Kentucky
F/C		Mike Todorovich	6 ft 5 in (1.96 m)	220 lb (100 kg)	1923–06–11	Wyoming

Coaches
Head coach
- Doxie Moore
- Bobby McDermott (interim player-coach)

Legend
- (DP) Unsigned draft pick
- (FA) Free agent
- (S) Suspended
- Injured

Roster

== Regular season ==
=== Season standings ===
Pos.	Western Division	Wins	Losses	Win %
1	Minneapolis Lakers	43	17	.717
2	Tri-Cities Blackhawks	30	30	.500
3	Oshkosh All-Stars	29	31	.483
4	Indianapolis Kautskys	24	35	.407
5	Sheboygan Red Skins	23	37	.383

=== NBL Schedule ===
Not to be confused with exhibition or other non-NBL scheduled games that did not count towards Sheboygan's official NBL record for this season. An official database created by John Grasso detailing every NBL match possible (outside of two matches that the Kankakee Gallagher Trojans won over the Dayton Metropolitans in 1938) would be released in 2026 showcasing every team's official schedules throughout their time spent in the NBL. As such, these are the official results recorded for the Sheboygan Red Skins during their tenth season in the NBL.

#	Date	Opponent	Score	Record
1	November 6	Fort Wayne	45–49	0–1
2	November 9	Toledo	54–48	1–1
3	November 10	@ Anderson	43–77	1–2
4	November 11	@ Indianapolis	53–57	1–3
5	November 13	Flint	65–59	2–3
6	November 17	@ Minneapolis	43–58	2–4
7	November 20	Minneapolis	56–41	3–4
8	November 21	@ Toledo	60–57 (OT)	4–4
9	November 25	@ Tri-Cities	69–66	5–4
10	November 27	Anderson	40–64	5–5
11	December 1	N Oshkosh	59–53	6–5
12	December 2	@ Flint	64–59	7–5
13	December 3	N Rochester	54–72	7–6
14	December 4	Tri-Cities	54–51	8–6
15	December 6	@ Syracuse	47–63	8–7
16	December 9	@ Rochester	58–73	8–8
17	December 11	@ Syracuse	58–53	9–8
18	December 13	@ Rochester	48–68	9–9
19	December 15	@ Flint/Midland (Midland)	72–62	10–9
20	December 18	Oshkosh	59–48	11–9
21	December 21	Indianapolis	51–58	11–10
22	December 22	@ Minneapolis	52–61	11–11
23	December 27	@ Oshkosh	49–51	11–12
24	December 28	Toledo	59–50	12–12
25	January 1	Flint/Midland	64–69	12–13
26	January 2	@ Toledo	63–62	13–13
27	January 3	@ Syracuse	45–57	13–14
28	January 4	@ Fort Wayne	50–61	13–15
29	January 5	@ Anderson	61–62	13–16
30	January 8	Fort Wayne	47–65	13–17
31	January 11	Indianapolis	60–46	14–17
32	January 15	Oshkosh	43–45	14–18
33	January 18	@ Tri-Cities	46–63	14–19
34	January 22	Tri-Cities	57–54	15–19
35	January 24	@ Oshkosh	54–58	15–20
36	January 25	Toledo	58–57	16–20
37	January 29	Anderson	65–70	16–21
38	February 1	Oshkosh	65–64	17–21
39	February 5	Rochester	53–60	17–22
40	February 8	Rochester	66–67 (2OT)	17–23
41	February 12	Minneapolis	57–68	17–24
42	February 15	Indianapolis	59–58	18–24
43	February 16	Syracuse	78–58	19–24
44	February 19	Syracuse	74–56	20–24
45	February 22	Syracuse	69–75	20–25
46	February 23	@ Toledo	46–57	20–26
47	February 24	@ Indianapolis	53–57	20–27
48	February 26	Fort Wayne	49–55	20–28
49	February 27	N Anderson	46–71	20–29
50	February 29	@ Fort Wayne	50–68	20–30
51	March 1	@ Flint/Midland (Midland)	70–67 (OT)	21–30
52	March 4	Flint/Midland	63–58	22–30
53	March 7	Minneapolis	67–68	22–31
54	March 8	@ Minneapolis	55–65 (OT)	22–32
55	March 10	@ Fort Wayne	53–62	22–33
56	March 11	Tri-Cities	51–53	22–34
57	March 14	@ Tri-Cities	68–64	23–34
58	March 16	@ Indianapolis	70–73	23–35
59	March 18	@ Anderson	76–80	23–36
60	March 20	@ Rochester	44–83	23–37

=== Awards and honors ===
- First Team All-NBL – Mike Todorovich
- Second Team All-NBL – Bobby McDermott
- NBL Rookie of the Year – Mike Todorovich
- NBL All-Rookie First Team – Mike Todorovich
- All-Time NBL Team – Ed Dancker, Bobby McDermott, and Mike Todorovich
