= 1947–48 Indianapolis Kautskys season =

NBL professional basketball team season

- Head coach: Glenn M. Curtis (6–10); Leo Klier (interim player-coach; 2–1); Bruce Hale (player-coach; 16–24)
- General manager: Frank Kautsky; Paul A. Walk
- Owner(s): Frank Kautsky; Paul A. Walk
- Arena: Butler Fieldhouse

Results
- Record: 24–35 (.407)
- Place: Division: 4th (Western)
- Playoff finish: Lost Western Division opening round to the Tri-Cities Blackhawks, 3–1

The 1947–48 Indianapolis Kautskys season was the seventh and final year that the Kautskys franchise would not only utilize that name for their team, but also played in the United States' National Basketball League (NBL), which was also the eleventh year the league existed. However, if you include their previous three seasons where they played in predecessor leagues of sorts in the National Professional Basketball League and the Midwest Basketball Conference, as well as the independent seasons they had in their history (including the three years they appeared in the World Professional Basketball Tournament where they played as the Indianapolis Pure Oils and Indianapolis Oilers during the World War II era), this would actually be their thirteenth (or sixteenth) and final season of play as the Kautskys within the wild history of the NBL before defecting to the rivaling Basketball Association of America in the hopes of acquiring extra money in order to help make sure their franchise survived their operations of planning in the long-term since Frank Kautsky's grocery store business was starting to not be strong enough to keep up with the demands of the higher operating wages that were in mind within the NBL. Unfortunately, the franchise's move from the NBL to the BAA would not be enough for them once this season concluded for them, as they would only end up surviving for one final season in the BAA before folding operations in relation to a future merger between the NBL and the BAA that officially became the National Basketball Association. This ultimately made the Indianapolis franchise the only franchise from the original NBL to BAA jump in 1948 (which also included the Fort Wayne Zollner Pistons, Rochester Royals, and new NBL champion Minneapolis Lakers) to not survive into the present-day era for the NBA (though two other teams that tried to defect from the NBL to the BAA during this same period of time in the Toledo Jeeps and Oshkosh All-Stars would also fold operations themselves in 1948 and 1949 respectively). Eleven teams competed in the NBL in the 1947–48 season, six in the Eastern Division and five in the Western Division (including the Indianapolis Kautskys), after the previous NBL champions of the season, the Chicago American Gears, ended up defecting from the NBL themselves in order to create a very ambitious, yet short-lived rivaling basketball league of their own called the Professional Basketball League of America.

The Kautskys entered this season by looking to improve upon their best performance yet in the NBL (which included a surprise championship victory at the 1947 World Professional Basketball Tournament over the Toledo Jeeps after previously never winning a single match there) by hiring former Detroit Falcons head coach Glenn M. Curtis (who left the team after the Falcons had essentially folded operations in their only season of play in the newly-rivaling Basketball Association of America) as the new head coach to start out the season. However, once the Kautskys started out the season with a below-average 6–10 record, Curtis was let go from his position (and subsequently retired from coaching altogether) and was replaced by Leo Klier as an interim player-coach for three games of theirs (winning two out of three games for the Kautskys) before Bruce Hale took over as the permanent player-coach of the team for the rest of their season. Despite Hale being the team's permanent player-coach for the rest of the season, the team would have a worse overall performance under him than from Glenn M. Curtis in terms of records produced, with Hale putting up a 16–24 performance for Indianapolis for the rest of the way for their final NBL season (with a controversial late-season trade of Arnie Risen going to the Rochester Royals occurring due to them thinking they weren't going to make it to the NBL Playoffs this season and needing extra money for this season). Even so, despite ending the season with a losing record of 24–35 (with a cancelled home game against the Toledo Jeeps being missed out on), the Kautskys would still win just enough games to advance to the NBL Playoffs for the last time in their history (with them barely beating out the Sheboygan Red Skins for the final playoff spot this season), with Indianapolis losing to the Tri-Cities Blackhawks (now Atlanta Hawks) 3–1 in the opening round of the playoffs. Once the NBL's season officially ended, the Kautskys would join the Fort Wayne Zollner Pistons as the first two teams to defect from the NBL to the rivaling BAA (albeit with team name changes in mind for them both due to their sponsorship brandings on their team names (the BAA did not allow for sponsorships on team names, similar to what would later go down for its successor league in the NBA)), which later caused the new NBL champion Minneapolis Lakers and runner-up Rochester Royals to reconsider on staying with the NBL to end up joining those two teams on their defection into the BAA. (The Oshkosh All-Stars and Toledo Jeeps also wanted to join in on the defection from the NBL to the BAA, but ultimately were declined their entries for reasons that aren't considered known to the general public (though they might relate to certain rules regarding their home venues that both teams didn't utilize properly on their ends at the time like court/venue size and flooring regulations at hand).) With those four teams leaving the NBL for the BAA alongside both the aforementioned Toledo Jeeps and the Flint/Midland Dow A.C.'s folding operations after the conclusion of this season, this ultimately left the NBL with only five teams remaining from this season (the Anderson Duffey Packers, Oshkosh All-Stars, Sheboygan Red Skins, Syracuse Nationals, and Tri-Cities Blackhawks) when the NBL later entered what was essentially their final season of existence.

== Draft picks ==
The Indianapolis Kautskys would participate in the 1947 NBL draft, which occurred right after the 1947 BAA draft due to a joint agreement the National Basketball League and the rivaling Basketball Association of America had with each other during the offseason period. However, as of 2026, no records of what the Kautskys' draft picks might have been for the NBL have properly come up, with any information on who those selections might have been being lost to time in the process.

== Roster ==
1947–48 Indianapolis Kautskys roster
Players

| Pos. | No. | Player | Height | Weight | DOB | From |
|---|---|---|---|---|---|---|
| G/F | 14 | Ernie Andres | 6 ft 1 in (1.85 m) | 200 lb (91 kg) | 1920–05–11 | Indiana |
| F | — | Ed Bogdanski | 6 ft 4 in (1.93 m) | 220 lb (100 kg) | 1921–07–30 | DePaul |
| F | 2 | Bill Closs | 6 ft 5 in (1.96 m) | 195 lb (88 kg) | 1922–01–08 | Rice |
| G/F | 10 | Bob Dietz | 6 ft 1 in (1.85 m) | 164 lb (74 kg) | 1917–12–04 | Butler |
| G/F | — | Jack Forestieri | 6 ft 0 in (1.83 m) | 185 lb (84 kg) | 1927–08–12 | Notre Dame |
| G | — | Hal Gensichen | 5 ft 11 in (1.80 m) | 170 lb (77 kg) | 1921–01–02 | Western Michigan |
| F/C | 11 | George Glamack | 6 ft 6 in (1.98 m) | 225 lb (102 kg) | 1918–06–07 | North Carolina |
| G/F | — | Don Grate | 6 ft 2 in (1.88 m) | 180 lb (82 kg) | 1923–08–27 | Ohio State |
| F/C | 5 | Bruce Hale | 6 ft 1 in (1.85 m) | 170 lb (77 kg) | 1918–08–30 | Santa Clara |
| G/F | 4 | Leo Klier | 6 ft 2 in (1.88 m) | 170 lb (77 kg) | 1923–05–21 | Notre Dame |
| G/F | 6 | Fred Lewis | 6 ft 2 in (1.88 m) | 195 lb (88 kg) | 1921–01–06 | Eastern Kentucky |
| G/F | — | Del Loranger | 6 ft 3 in (1.91 m) | 175 lb (79 kg) | 1920–03–17 | Western Michigan |
| G/F | 9 | Fritz Nagy | 6 ft 2 in (1.88 m) | 185 lb (84 kg) | 1924–01–03 | Akron |
| G/F | — | Woody Norris | 6 ft 1 in (1.85 m) | 170 lb (77 kg) | 1919–06–18 | Butler |
| F/C | — | Roy Pugh | 6 ft 6 in (1.98 m) | 210 lb (95 kg) | 1922–10–16 | SMU |
| C | — | Arnie Risen | 6 ft 9 in (2.06 m) | 200 lb (91 kg) | 1924–10–09 | Ohio State |
| G/F | — | Herm Schaefer | 6 ft 0 in (1.83 m) | 175 lb (79 kg) | 1918–12–20 | Indiana |
| C | 12 | Jim Springer | 6 ft 9 in (2.06 m) | 235 lb (107 kg) | 1926–06–17 | Canterbury |
| G/F | — | Milt Ticco | 6 ft 3 in (1.91 m) | 190 lb (86 kg) | 1922–09–22 | Kentucky |

Coaches
Head coach
- Glenn M. Curtis
- Leo Klier (interim player-coach)
- Bruce Hale (player-coach)

Legend
- (DP) Unsigned draft pick
- (FA) Free agent
- (S) Suspended
- Injured

Roster

Note: Over half of the team's roster would not play on the team's playoff roster this season, with Ed Bogdanski, Jack Forestieri, Hal Gensichen, Don Grate, Del Loranger, Woody Norris, Roy Pugh, Arnie Risen, Herm Schaefer, and Milt Ticco not being on the team's final playoff roster for one reason or another.

== Regular season ==
=== Season standings ===
| Pos. | Western Division | Wins | Losses | Win % |
|---|---|---|---|---|
| 1 | Minneapolis Lakers | 43 | 17 | .717 |
| 2 | Tri-Cities Blackhawks | 30 | 30 | .500 |
| 3 | Oshkosh All-Stars | 29 | 31 | .483 |
| 4 | Indianapolis Kautskys | 24 | 35 | .407 |
| 5 | Sheboygan Red Skins | 23 | 37 | .383 |

=== NBL Schedule ===
Not to be confused with exhibition or other non-NBL scheduled games that did not count towards Indianapolis' official NBL record for this season. An official database created by John Grasso detailing every NBL match possible (outside of two matches that the Kankakee Gallagher Trojans won over the Dayton Metropolitans in 1938) would be released in 2026 showcasing every team's official schedules throughout their time spent in the NBL. As such, these are the official results recorded for the Indianapolis Kautskys during their seventh and final season in the NBL (third and final season in their second and final return) under that name for the league before moving on into the BAA (which later became the NBA) for their upcoming season of play.

| # | Date | Opponent | Score | Record |
| 1 | November 4 | Oshkosh | 58–65 | 0–1 |
| 2 | November 9 | @ Fort Wayne | 69–62 | 1–1 |
| 3 | November 11 | Sheboygan | 57–53 | 2–1 |
| 4 | November 18 | Rochester | 53–56 | 2–2 |
| 5 | November 20 | @ Tri-Cities | 54–65 | 2–3 |
| 6 | November 22 | Tri-Cities | 62–48 | 3–3 |
| 7 | November 23 | @ Minneapolis | 56–67 | 3–4 |
| 8 | November 25 | Toledo | 65–55 | 4–4 |
| 9 | November 30 | @ Fort Wayne | 56–67 | 4–5 |
| 10 | December 2 | Fort Wayne | 40–45 | 4–6 |
| 11 | December 8 | @ Anderson | 54–62 | 4–7 |
| 12 | December 9 | Flint | 77–44 | 5–7 |
| 13 | December 12 | Tri-Cities | 53–55 | 5–8 |
| 14 | December 16 | Syracuse | 80–72 | 6–8 |
| 15 | December 18 | @ Rochester | 47–80 | 6–9 |
| 16 | December 19 | @ Syracuse | 37–47 | 6–10 |
| 17 | December 20 | @ Oshkosh | 47–57 | 6–11 |
| 18 | December 21 | @ Sheboygan | 58–51 | 7–11 |
| 19 | December 22 | @ Toledo | 63–57 | 8–11 |
| 20 | December 23 | Anderson | 55–52 | 9–11 |
| 21 | December 26 | Fort Wayne | 60–58 | 10–11 |
| 22 | December 27 | N Syracuse | 53–64 | 10–12 |
| 23 | December 28 | @ Minneapolis | 48–58 | 10–13 |
| 24 | December 30 | Flint | 77–57 | 11–13 |
| 25 | January 1 | Anderson | 66–72 | 11–14 |
| 26 | January 6 | Toledo | 63–56 | 12–14 |
| 27 | January 8 | @ Toledo | 47–62 | 12–15 |
| 28 | January 11 | @ Sheboygan | 46–60 | 12–16 |
| 29 | January 13 | Minneapolis | 45–64 | 12–17 |
| 30 | January 14 | @ Flint | 55–59 | 12–18 |
| 31 | January 15 | @ Syracuse | 51–53 | 12–19 |
| 32 | January 17 | @ Oshkosh | 58–91 | 12–20 |
| 33 | January 20 | Rochester | 56–58 | 12–21 |
| 34 | January 22 | @ Toledo | 53–63 | 12–22 |
| 35 | January 24 | @ Rochester | 58–80 | 12–23 |
| 36 | January 25 | @ Fort Wayne | 56–71 | 12–24 |
| 37 | January 27 | Oshkosh | 69–65 | 13–24 |
| 38 | January 28 | Flint | 76–67 | 14–24 |
| 39 | February 1 | @ Minneapolis | 55–85 | 14–25 |
| 40 | February 2 | Tri-Cities | 77–67 | 15–25 |
| 41 | February 5 | @ Anderson | 54–73 | 15–26 |
| 42 | February 8 | @ Tri-Cities | 68–81 | 15–27 |
| 43 | February 10 | Fort Wayne | 65–73 | 15–28 |
| 44 | February 11 | N Syracuse | 57–53 | 16–28 |
| 45 | February 12 | N Oshkosh | 67–64 | 17–28 |
| 46 | February 14 | @ Oshkosh | 48–70 | 17–29 |
| 47 | February 15 | @ Sheboygan | 58–59 | 17–30 |
| 48 | February 17 | Minneapolis | 58–66 | 17–31 |
| 49 | February 22 | N Tri-Cities | 58–70 | 17–32 |
| 50 | February 24 | Sheboygan | 57–53 | 18–32 |
| 51 | February 26 | @ Syracuse | 60–83 | 18–33 |
| 52 | February 29 | @ Flint | 87–57 | 19–33 |
| 53 | March 2 | Minneapolis | 83–63 | 20–33 |
| 54 | March 7 | N Rochester | 46–61 | 20–34 |
| 55 | March 9 | Anderson | 76–64 | 21–34 |
| 56 | March 11 | Rochester | 74–68 | 22–34 |
| 57 | March 16 | Sheboygan | 73–70 | 23–34 |
| 58 | March 17 | Anderson | 77–79 | 23–35 |
| 59 | March 18 | N Flint/Midland | 73–70 | 24–35 |

A 60th game was intended to have been played between the Indianapolis Kautskys and the Toledo Jeeps (presumably having the Kautskys being the home team in that match due to Indianapolis already playing 30 road games this season), but that game was ultimately cancelled for them both, meaning the 59th game of the regular season for them both would be their final regular season games in the NBL for each of them, albeit for completely different reasons between them two.

== NBL Playoffs ==
=== NBL Western Division Opening Round ===
(4W) Indianapolis Kautskys vs. (2W) Tri-Cities Blackhawks: Tri-Cities win series 3–1

- Game 1: March 23, 1948 @ Indianapolis: Tri-Cities 77, Indianapolis 67
- Game 2: March 24, 1948 @ Indianapolis: Indianapolis 89, Tri-Cities 70
- Game 3: March 26, 1948 @ Moline, Illinois (Tri-Cities): Tri-Cities 70, Indianapolis 59
- Game 4: March 27, 1948 @ Moline, Illinois (Tri-Cities): Tri-Cities 74, Indianapolis 61

=== Awards and honors ===
- NBL All-Time Team – George Glamack and Arnie Risen

== World Professional Basketball Tournament ==
For presumably the fifth and final time in franchise history (potentially going up to the eighth and final time in franchise history if they played the 1943–1945 events under the Indianapolis Pure Oils and Indianapolis Oilers names despite being considered under hiatus at the time), the Indianapolis Kautskys would look to defend their championship in the World Professional Basketball Tournament by competing in what would ultimately become the final WPBT ever held in the 1948 World Professional Basketball Tournament held in Chicago. Unlike previous tournaments held throughout the prior decade that the WPBT had its history in, this event would only see eight teams competing in this event, with this WPBT mostly being seen as a pseudo-NBL Tournament of sorts held within the NBL Playoffs, as a majority of the competing teams (including the defending champion Kautskys) would be from the NBL alongside two independently ran teams that competed against each other in the first round and the Wilkes-Barre Barons from the rivaling American Basketball League that would compete against the eventual NBL champion Minneapolis Lakers in the first round. For the Kautskys, their first round opponent would be against a fellow Indiana team in the Anderson Duffey Packers, who had switched divisions in the NBL due to the Tri-Cities Blackhawks' permanent move from Buffalo, New York to Moline, Illinois the previous season and benefitted in a major way from it. While the Kautskys would try their best to continue their newly found winning ways in the WPBT, even after the disappointing regular season and playoffs that they had this time around, they ultimately faltered in a way similar to their previous appearances in the WPBT before their last appearance, losing 59–53 to the Duffey Packers and ending their WPBT run as the worst repeating squad to win multiple games in the WPBT's history (despite winning a championship in the tournament's history for the penultimate year it existed).

=== Game Played ===
- Lost first round (53–59) to the Anderson Duffey Packers
