= 1947–48 Tri-Cities Blackhawks season =

NBL professional basketball team season

- Head coach: Nat Hickey (player-coach; 9–12); Billy Hassett (interim player-coach; 1–0); Bobby McDermott (player-coach; 20–18)
- Arena: Wharton Field House

Results
- Record: 30–30 (.500)
- Place: Division: 2nd (Western)
- Playoff finish: Lost Western Division Semifinals to Minneapolis Lakers, 0–2
- Stats at Basketball Reference

The 1947–48 season was the Tri-Cities Blackhawks' second season in the National Basketball League (NBL) and its first full season in Moline, Illinois under the Tri-Cities Blackhawks name. The Blackhawks moved from the Eastern Division to the Western Division as a result of the previous season's franchise move from Buffalo, New York to the area that was previously considered the Tri-Cities area at the time that represented both the states of Illinois and Iowa with Moline and Rock Island, Illinois and Davenport, Iowa (though they primarily played in the state of Illinois). This also became the last season where they had the elderly Nat Hickey involved as the player-coach for the team, as he would be waived from the team (to later be a player-coach for the Providence Steamrollers in the rivaling BAA) and replaced by Billy Hassett as the interim player-coach for a game before ultimately being replaced by Bobby McDermott for the rest of the season. in The Tri-Cities Blackhawks finished their season with an average record (.500), which was good enough for a second place finish in the Western Division, and qualified for postseason play for the first time in the franchise's history. The Blackhawks also won their first playoff series with a 3–1 series victory in the Western Division opening round over the Indianapolis Kautskys, though they would end up getting swept in a 0–2 series defeat in the Western Division Semifinals to the eventual NBL champions that started to grow their name as a major franchise, the Minneapolis Lakers.

== Draft picks ==
The Tri-Cities Blackhawks would participate in the 1947 NBL draft, which occurred right after the 1947 BAA draft due to a joint agreement the National Basketball League and the rivaling Basketball Association of America had with each other during the offseason period. However, as of 2026, no records of what the Blackhawks' draft picks might have been for the NBL have properly come up, with any information on who those selections might have been being lost to time in the process.

== Roster ==
1947–48 Tri-Cities Blackhawks roster
Players

Pos.	No.	Player	Height	Weight	DOB	From
F/C	–	Paul Anthony	6 ft 5 in (1.96 m)	195 lb (88 kg)	1924-01-23	Washington & Jefferson
F/C	14	Wally Borrevik	6 ft 8 in (2.03 m)	205 lb (93 kg)	1921-11-14	Oregon
F/C	13	Joe Camic	6 ft 4 in (1.93 m)	195 lb (88 kg)	1922-11-18	Duquesne
G/F	–	Johnny Ezersky	6 ft 3 in (1.91 m)	175 lb (79 kg)	1922-03-21	Power Memorial Academy (NY)
G/F	–	Dick Furey	6 ft 3 in (1.91 m)	195 lb (88 kg)	1925-03-08	St. Thomas (MN)
F/C	–	Bob Gerber	6 ft 4 in (1.93 m)	190 lb (86 kg)	1916-08-01	Toledo
G/F	4	Al Grenert	6 ft 0 in (1.83 m)	190 lb (86 kg)	1919-07-08	NYU
G/F	16	Luther Harris	6 ft 3 in (1.91 m)	195 lb (88 kg)	1923-08-27	East Alton–Wood River HS (IL)
G	8	Billy Hassett	5 ft 11 in (1.80 m)	185 lb (84 kg)	1921-10-21	Notre Dame
G/F	–	Nat Hickey	5 ft 11 in (1.80 m)	180 lb (82 kg)	1902-01-30	Hoboken HS (NJ)
F/C	–	Bob Hubbard	6 ft 6 in (1.98 m)	215 lb (98 kg)	1922-12-27	Springfield
G/F	–	Roy Hurley	6 ft 2 in (1.88 m)	170 lb (77 kg)	1922-08-12	Arsenal Technical HS (IN)
F	–	Jimmy Joyce	6 ft 5 in (1.96 m)	195 lb (88 kg)	1924-10-23	Temple
F/C	9	Ed Lewinski	6 ft 4 in (1.93 m)	210 lb (95 kg)	1918-09-10	Bowen HS (IL)
G	12	Bobby McDermott	6 ft 0 in (1.83 m)	185 lb (84 kg)	1914-01-07	Flushing HS (NY)
C	15	Don Otten	6 ft 10 in (2.08 m)	240 lb (109 kg)	1921-04-18	Bowling Green
G/F	11	Howie Rader	6 ft 1 in (1.85 m)	190 lb (86 kg)	1921-03-29	Long Island
G/F	–	Ray Ramsey	6 ft 2 in (1.88 m)	165 lb (75 kg)	1921-07-18	Bradley
G/F	7	Bob Skarda	6 ft 3 in (1.91 m)	190 lb (86 kg)	1925-11-28	Tufts
G	–	Mel Thurston	6 ft 0 in (1.83 m)	175 lb (79 kg)	1919-01-16	Canisius
G/F	–	Dick Triptow	6 ft 0 in (1.83 m)	170 lb (77 kg)	1922-11-03	DePaul
G/F	5	Whitey Von Nieda	6 ft 1 in (1.85 m)	170 lb (77 kg)	1922-06-19	Penn State

Coaches
Head coach
- Nat Hickey
- Billy Hassett
- Bobby McDermott

Legend
- (DP) Unsigned draft pick
- (FA) Free agent
- (S) Suspended
- Injured

Roster

Note: Only half of the roster would be a part of the playoff roster properly, as Paul Anthony, Johnny Ezersky, Dick Furey, Bob Gerber, elderly player-coach Nat Hickey, Bob Hubbard, Roy Hurley, Jimmy Joyce, Ray Ramsey, Bob Skarda, Mel Thurston, and Dick Triptow were not a part of the playoff roster for one reason or another.

== Season standings ==
=== Western Division standings ===
Pos.	Western Division	Wins	Losses	Win %
1	Minneapolis Lakers	43	17	.717
2	Tri-Cities Blackhawks	30	30	.500
3	Oshkosh All-Stars	29	31	.483
4	Indianapolis Kautskys	24	35	.407
5	Sheboygan Red Skins	23	37	.383

=== NBL Schedule ===
Not to be confused with exhibition or other non-NBL scheduled games that did not count towards the Tri-Cities' official NBL record for this season. An official database created by John Grasso detailing every NBL match possible (outside of two matches that the Kankakee Gallagher Trojans won over the Dayton Metropolitans in 1938) would be released in 2026 showcasing every team's official schedules throughout their time spent in the NBL. As such, these are the official results recorded for the Tri-Cities Blackhawks in their second season in the NBL (first full season following the new Buffalo Bisons team moving from Buffalo, New York to Moline, Illinois near the end of 1946, with the Blackhawks officially playing their NBL games from the previous season at the start of 1947).

#	Date	Opponent	Score	Record
1	November 9	Minneapolis	66–58	1–0
2	November 13	@ Minneapolis	41–57	1–1
3	November 15	N Syracuse	72–73	1–2
4	November 16	Syracuse	69–56	2–2
5	November 17	@ Anderson	66–79	2–3
6	November 20	Indianapolis	65–54	3–3
7	November 22	@ Indianapolis	48–62	3–4
8	November 23	Anderson	68–52	4–4
9	November 25	Sheboygan	66–69	4–5
10	November 30	Flint	83–69	5–5
11	December 4	@ Sheboygan	51–54	5–6
12	December 6	@ Oshkosh	50–60	5–7
13	December 7	Fort Wayne	49–63	5–8
14	December 9	Oshkosh	57–56	6–8
15	December 12	@ Indianapolis	55–53	7–8
16	December 14	Toledo	65–76	7–9
17	December 18	Anderson	41–42	7–10
18	December 21	@ Minneapolis	62–68	7–11
19	December 23	Rochester	58–59	7–12
20	December 28	Syracuse	53–43	8–12
21	December 30	Syracuse	65–57	9–12
22	January 2	@ Syracuse	50–45	10–12
23	January 3	@ Rochester	60–68	10–13
24	January 5	@ Toledo	59–56	11–13
25	January 7	@ Flint	62–53	12–13
26	January 8	@ Anderson	57–83	12–14
27	January 9	N Flint	60–54	13–14
28	January 11	Minneapolis	44–35	14–14
29	January 15	Toledo	60–54	15–14
30	January 18	Sheboygan	63–46	16–14
31	January 20	Fort Wayne	79–69	17–14
32	January 22	@ Sheboygan	54–57	17–15
33	January 25	Oshkosh	74–76 (OT)	17–16
34	January 27	N Flint/Midland	62–50	18–16
35	January 28	Oshkosh	54–73	18–17
36	January 31	Anderson	60–70	18–18
37	February 1	@ Fort Wayne	48–52	18–19
38	February 2	@ Indianapolis	67–77	18–20
39	February 5	Oshkosh	70–65	19–20
40	February 8	Indianapolis	81–68	20–20
41	February 9	@ Flint/Midland (Midland)	67–63	21–20
42	February 10	@ Toledo	68–55	22–20
43	February 12	@ Syracuse	60–69	22–21
44	February 14	@ Rochester	60–55	23–21
45	February 17	@ Rochester	64–78	23–22
46	February 19	Toledo	39–54	23–23
47	February 22	N Indianapolis	70–58	24–23
48	February 23	@ Minneapolis	48–57	24–24
49	February 27	Fort Wayne	66–68	24–25
50	March 1	@ Anderson	68–75	24–26
51	March 4	Rochester	53–64	24–27
52	March 7	Flint/Midland	85–75	25–27
53	March 9	Rochester	67–50	26–27
54	March 10	@ Oshkosh	56–68	26–28
55	March 11	@ Sheboygan	53–51	27–28
56	March 13	N Toledo	61–55	28–28
57	March 14	Sheboygan	64–68	28–29
58	March 17	@ Fort Wayne	56–74	28–30
59	March 19	Fort Wayne	72–55	29–30
60	March 21	Minneapolis	65–61	30–30

== NBL Playoffs ==
=== NBL Western Division Opening Round ===
(2W) Tri-Cities Blackhawks vs. (4W) Indianapolis Kautskys: Tri-Cities wins series 3–1

- Game 1: March 23, 1948 @ Indianapolis: Tri-Cities 77, Indianapolis 67
- Game 2: March 24, 1948 @ Indianapolis: Indianapolis 89, Tri-Cities 70
- Game 3: March 26, 1948 @ Moline, Illinois (Tri-Cities): Tri-Cities 70, Indianapolis 59
- Game 4: March 27, 1948 @ Moline, Illinois (Tri-Cities): Tri-Cities 74, Indianapolis 61

=== NBL Western Division Semifinals ===
(2W) Tri-Cities Blackhawks vs. (1W) Minneapolis Lakers: Minneapolis wins series 2–0

- Game 1: March 30, 1948 @ Moline, Illinois (Tri-Cities): Minneapolis 98, Tri-Cities 79
- Game 2: March 31, 1948 @ Minneapolis: Minneapolis 83, Tri-Cities 59

== Awards and records ==
- All-NBL Second Team – Don Otten and Bobby McDermott
- NBL All-Rookie First Team – Whitey Von Nieda
- All-Time NBL Team – Don Otten and Bobby McDermott

== World Professional Basketball Tournament ==
For the second and final time in franchise history, shortly prior to the NBL Finals beginning, during the days of April 8-11, 1948, the Tri-Cities Blackhawks would participate in the World Professional Basketball Tournament in Chicago (this time feeling much more comfortable with their position as a franchise than they were the previous season), with the final event ever held seeing the final eight teams participating mostly consisting of teams from the National Basketball League for a change of pace, with the only other professional team competing being the Wilkes-Barre Barons of the American Basketball League (who competed against the technically newly-formed Minneapolis Lakers in the quarterfinal round) and the only two independently ran teams being the New York Renaissance and the Bridgeport Newfields, who competed against each other in the quarterfinal round. Initially, there was supposed to have been a championship series between the champions of the National Basketball League (which became the Lakers) and the newly-rivaling Basketball Association of America (which were formerly the older rivaling American Basketball League's own Baltimore Bullets, which was also the BAA's original Baltimore Bullets franchise) in 1948, but that ultimately never came to fruition. In the quarterfinal round, the Blackhawks went up against the long-time competing Fort Wayne Zollner Pistons, who still remained a threat despite no longer being defending WPBT champions. However, due to the leadership of player-coach Bobby McDermott (a former Zollner Pistons player himself), he would help the Blackhawks upset the Zollner Pistons with a 57–50 win to end Fort Wayne's WPBT history in the tournament.

In the semifinal round, the Blackhawks saw themselves go up against the sole surviving independently ran team of the WPBT, the all-black, long-standing New York Renaissance. McDermott's leadership and experience in the WPBT would help the Blackhawks keep things close with the Rens, but the New York squad (being led by Nat Clifton for the All-Tournament First Team and multi-athlete George Crowe for the All-Tournament Second Team) proved to be too much for the Tri-Cities squad, as the Renaissance eliminated the Blackhawks 59–55 from championship play and the Tri-Cities had to settle for a chance at a third place finish by facing off against the losing squad between the Minneapolis Lakers and the Anderson Duffey Packers instead.

For the final third place consolation prize match in WPBT history, the Tri-Cities Blackhawks saw themselves go up against the Anderson Duffey Packers, missing out on facing off against star center George Mikan entirely in this tournament. Despite that fact, the Blackhawks did keep things evened up with the Duffey Packers for the first half of the match (being tied 27–27 by halftime) before Anderson heated things up in the second half with Ralph Johnson and Rollie Seltz leading the charge for 39 second half points to have the Tri-Cities lose 66–44, denying them a third place finish in the final WPBT ever tournament. Despite failing to place, Bobby McDermott was named a member of the All-Tournament Second Team.

=== Games Played ===
- Won quarterfinal round (57–50) over the Fort Wayne Zollner Pistons
- Lost semifinal round (55–59) to the New York Renaissance
- Lost third place consolation prize match (44–66) to the Anderson Duffey Packers

=== Awards and honors ===
- Bobby McDermott, All-Tournament Second Team
