= 1947–48 Toledo Jeeps season =

NBL professional basketball team season

- Head coach: Jule Rivlin (player-coach)
- General manager: Virgil Gladieux
- Owner(s): Virgil Gladieux; Willys-Overland Jeep Plant
- Arena: The Field House (University of Toledo)

Results
- Record: 22–37 (.373)
- Place: Division: 5th (Eastern)
- Playoff finish: Did not qualify

The 1947–48 Toledo Jeeps season was technically the second and final professional basketball season of play for the Toledo Jeeps in the city of Toledo, Ohio under the National Basketball League, which officially was the eleventh season that it existed as a professional basketball league after previously existing as a semi-pro or amateur basketball league called the Midwest Basketball Conference in its first two seasons back in 1935. However, according to historian and author Murry R. Nelson in his book The National Basketball League: A History, 1935–1949, the Toledo Jeeps are actually a continuation of the original Toledo White Huts/Toledo Jim White Chevrolets franchise that, similar to the Jeeps franchise, started out playing in the World Professional Basketball Tournament in a previous year before officially joining the NBL, with the only difference in ownership being the partnership in question as the team owners this time around were at Willys-Overland Jeep Plant, which was owned and operated by Virgil Gladieux of Willys at the time (now known as the Toledo Complex) and sold Jeep cars instead of being owned and operated by a car salesman named Jim White for Chevrolet cars. As such, if we count the history of the White Huts/Jim White Chevrolets alongside the Jeeps franchise here, including the two previous independent seasons of play where they participated in the aforementioned WPBT events before being promoted to the NBL while using a different team name at the time (with one of these WPBT participations on their ends supposedly using the shortened up Toledo Whites team name instead of the original White Huts team name), this season would officially be their sixth and final season of play when including the four games they played in the final NBL season using the Jim White Chevrolets team name before technically folding the first time around before returning to operate once again instead of their second (and final) season as a franchise properly.

Unlike their inaugural season, where Toledo started out very promisingly before faltering off, the Jeeps would start the season out in direct competition with the Syracuse Nationals for the last open playoff spot in the Eastern Division after that division had the top three teams get settled early on in the season with the Rochester Royals, Anderson Duffey Packers, and Fort Wayne Zollner Pistons being considered the best teams in their division almost immediately after a 2–0 start to their season. While Toledo would keep things neck-and-neck with the Nationals for the final playoff spot in the NBL, the Jeeps would ultimately falter and end up being a game and a half shy from the final playoff spot with a 22–37 record. Worse yet, the Jeeps franchise would end up joining the Oshkosh All-Stars as one of two NBL franchises to not defect from the NBL to the upstart rivaling Basketball Association of America as a means of hopefully surviving for a better long-term future at hand, similar to what the Fort Wayne Zollner Pistons, Minneapolis Lakers, and Rochester Royals would end up doing following this season as they, alongside the Indianapolis Kautskys, successfully defected from the NBL to the BAA by comparison to them. (Supposedly, for the Jeeps' case, the reason why they failed to transition from the NBL to the BAA was because the University of Toledo's Field House used slippery terrazzo for their basketball court instead of the usual wooden floors for indoor matches, which was deemed unviable for the BAA's standards of play.) Following the season's end, the Toledo Jeeps would end up folding operations entirely, with their position as a team being bought out (under the discretion of new NBL president Ike W. Duffey (who was also the team owner of the Anderson Duffey Packers)) by the expansion team known as the Hammond Calumet Buccaneers through an ownership model similar to that of the Green Bay Packers and the two Wisconsin-based teams in the NBL. This season would also be notable for Jackie Goldsmith's involvement with the team; Goldsmith would later be better known for his involvement in the 1951 college basketball point-shaving scandal that involved a total of 34 (later 35) past or present college basketball players from that time in seven (later eight) colleges to fix matches by point-shaving for betting purposes (like in Goldsmith's case as a since-retired player) that almost completely ruined the sport of basketball's reputation entirely at the time.

== Draft picks ==
The Toledo Jeeps would participate in the 1947 NBL draft, which occurred right after the 1947 BAA draft due to a joint agreement the National Basketball League and the rivaling Basketball Association of America had with each other during the offseason period. However, as of 2026, no records of what the Jeeps' draft picks might have been for the NBL have properly come up, with any information on who those selections might have been being lost to time in the process.

== Roster ==
Please note that due to the way records for professional basketball leagues like the NBL and the ABL were recorded at the time, some information on both teams and players may be harder to list out than usual here.

1947–48 Toledo Jeeps roster
Players

Pos.	No.	Player	Height	Weight	DOB	From
C		Harry Boykoff	6 ft 10 in (2.08 m)	225 lb (102 kg)	1922–07–24	St. John's
F/C		Jerry Bush	6 ft 3 in (1.91 m)	200 lb (91 kg)	1914–09–06	St. John's
G		Fran Curran	6 ft 0 in (1.83 m)	175 lb (79 kg)	1922–09–09	Notre Dame
G		Jackie Goldsmith	5 ft 8 in (1.73 m)	155 lb (70 kg)	1921–01–18	Long Island
G/F		Wyndol Gray	6 ft 1 in (1.85 m)	175 lb (79 kg)	1922–03–30	Harvard
G/F		Dale Hamilton	6 ft 0 in (1.83 m)	180 lb (82 kg)	1919–08–16	Franklin (IN)
F/C		Bernie Mehen	6 ft 4 in (1.93 m)	185 lb (84 kg)	1918–09–19	Tennessee
F/C		Dick Mehen	6 ft 5 in (1.96 m)	195 lb (88 kg)	1922–05–20	Tennessee
G/F		Jule Rivlin	5 ft 11 in (1.80 m)	160 lb (73 kg)	1917–02–17	Marshall
F/C		John Schick	6 ft 6 in (1.98 m)	230 lb (104 kg)	1916–01–06	Ohio State
G		Chips Sobek	6 ft 0 in (1.83 m)	180 lb (82 kg)	1920–02–10	Notre Dame
G/F		Hal Tidrick	6 ft 1 in (1.85 m)	190 lb (86 kg)	1915–08–04	Washington & Jefferson

Coaches
Head coach
- Jule Rivlin

Legend
- (DP) Unsigned draft pick
- (FA) Free agent
- (S) Suspended
- Injured

Roster

== Regular season ==
=== Season standings ===
Pos.	Eastern Division	Wins	Losses	Win %
1	Rochester Royals	44	16	.733
2	Anderson Duffey Packers	42	18	.700
3	Fort Wayne Zollner Pistons	40	20	.667
4	Syracuse Nationals	24	36	.400
5	Toledo Jeeps	22	37	.373
6	Flint/Midland Dow A.C.'s^{‡}	8	52	.133
^{‡} Flint relocated to Midland during the season and assumed Flint's record in the standings. It's unknown what the records for Flint's tenure and Midland's tenure were.

=== NBL Schedule ===
Not to be confused with exhibition or other non-NBL scheduled games that did not count towards Toledo's official NBL record for this season. An official database created by John Grasso detailing every NBL match possible (outside of two matches that the Kankakee Gallagher Trojans won over the Dayton Metropolitans in 1938) would be released in 2026 showcasing every team's official schedules throughout their time spent in the NBL. As such, these are the official results recorded for the Toledo Jeeps during their second and final season (or fourth and final overall season if the Toledo Jim White Chevrolets also gets counted as a part of the Toledo Jeeps' history) in the NBL.

#	Date	Opponent	Score	Record
1	November 7	Flint	75–56	1–0
2	November 8	@ Oshkosh	61–60	2–0
3	November 9	@ Sheboygan	48–54	2–1
4	November 14	Fort Wayne	53–59	2–2
5	November 20	N Oshkosh	43–59	2–3
6	November 21	Sheboygan	57–60 (OT)	2–4
7	November 23	@ Fort Wayne	49–62	2–5
8	November 25	@ Indianapolis	55–65	2–6
9	November 27	Rochester	50–41	3–6
10	November 29	@ Syracuse	48–59	3–7
11	December 2	Minneapolis	59–57	4–7
12	December 5	Anderson	55–71	4–8
13	December 6	@ Rochester	55–56	4–9
14	December 10	@ Minneapolis	46–49	4–10
15	December 14	@ Tri-Cities	76–65	5–10
16	December 17	@ Syracuse	72–54	6–10
17	December 18	N Minneapolis	56–66	6–11
18	December 19	Fort Wayne	55–50	7–11
19	December 21	@ Flint	51–48	8–11
20	December 22	Indianapolis	57–63	8–12
21	December 27	@ Minneapolis	52–55	8–13
22	December 28	@ Sheboygan	50–59	8–14
23	December 30	@ Anderson	58–71	8–15
24	January 2	Sheboygan	62–63	8–16
25	January 5	Tri-Cities	56–59	8–17
26	January 6	@ Indianapolis	56–63	8–18
27	January 8	Indianapolis	62–47	9–18
28	January 10	@ Rochester	74–65	10–18
29	January 12	@ Flint/Midland (Midland)	51–56	10–19
30	January 15	@ Tri-Cities	54–60	10–20
31	January 18	@ Fort Wayne	49–54	10–21
32	January 19	@ Anderson	50–76	10–22
33	January 20	Flint/Midland	64–51	11–22
34	January 22	Indianapolis	63–53	12–22
35	January 25	@ Sheboygan	57–58	12–23
36	January 29	Rochester	52–51	12–24
37	January 31	Syracuse	48–58	12–25
38	February 2	@ Anderson	42–38	13–25
39	February 3	Fort Wayne	59–57	14–25
40	February 7	Anderson	69–53	15–25
41	February 10	Tri-Cities	55–68	15–26
42	February 12	Flint/Midland	79–56	16–26
43	February 14	@ Minneapolis	50–65	16–27
44	February 17	Oshkosh	68–70 (2OT)	16–28
45	February 19	@ Tri-Cities	54–39	17–28
46	February 20	Rochester	41–49	17–29
47	February 22	@ Fort Wayne	41–49	17–30
48	February 23	@ Sheboygan	57–46	18–30
49	February 27	@ Flint/Midland (Flint)	76–65	19–30
50	February 28	@ Oshkosh	59–64 (OT)	19–31
51	March 1	Syracuse	55–59	19–32
52	March 2	@ Rochester	50–66	19–33
53	March 4	@ Syracuse	49–45	20–33
54	March 6	Anderson	58–56	21–33
55	March 11	@ Syracuse	45–48	21–34
56	March 13	N Tri-Cities	55–61	21–35
57	March 15	Oshkosh	43–47	21–36
58	March 16	Oshkosh	53–50	22–36
59	March 17	Minneapolis	56–60	22–37

A 60th game was intended to have been played between the Toledo Jeeps and the Indianapolis Kautskys (presumably having Toledo being the road team in that match due to Indianapolis already playing 30 road games this season), but that game was ultimately cancelled for them both, meaning the 59th game of the regular season for them both would be their final regular season games in the NBL for each of them.

== Awards and honors ==
- Harry Boykoff – NBL All-Rookie Second Team
- Fran Curran – NBL All-Rookie Second Team
- Jerry Bush – NBL All-Time Team
