= 1947–48 Rochester Royals season =

NBL professional basketball team season

- Division champions
- Head coach: Les Harrison & Eddie Malanowicz
- Owners: Jack Harrison; Les Harrison
- Arena: Edgerton Park Arena

Results
- Record: 44–16 (.733)
- Place: Division: 1st (Eastern)
- Playoff finish: Lost NBL Championship (1-3) to the Minneapolis Lakers
- Stats at Basketball Reference
- Radio: WHAM

The 1947–48 Rochester Royals season was the franchise's third professional season of play while under the Rochester Royals name and their final season in the National Basketball League (NBL). The team finished with a 44–16 record, which became the best record in the NBL by one game over the upstart Minneapolis Lakers. Rochester would end up beating their league rivaling Fort Wayne Zollner Pistons 3–1 in the quarterfinal round and then beat the Anderson Duffey Packers 2–1 before returning to the NBL Finals for the third and final time in their history. Once again, they saw themselves go up against the towering star center George Mikan (who had been picked up by what was considered to be the newly-established Lakers squad despite them picking up their past history from an awful Detroit Gems squad after the Chicago American Gears left the NBL for the short-lived Professional Basketball League of America and folded after that league went down a lot earlier than they expected it to and the American Gears weren't allowed back into the NBL), and once again, Mikan's presence as a player proved to be too much for the Royals to overcome, as they ended up losing the NBL Championship 3–1 for the second straight year in a row, this time to the newly-established Lakers (who would soon grow to be a powerhouse force in basketball history) instead. Following this season's conclusion, both the Royals (who only had one objection from the BAA's side from Ned Irish in terms of allowing them to join in) and defending NBL champion Lakers, alongside the Fort Wayne Zollner Pistons and Indianapolis Kautskys would end up leaving the NBL to play for the Basketball Association of America (now known as the National Basketball Association), though the Zollner Pistons would drop the Zollner part of their name and the Kautskys would rename themselves to the Indianapolis Jets due to that league not allowing teams to have sponsorships to also be a part of their team names. Since then, the Jets folded operations entirely, while the other surviving NBL teams that switched teams moved elsewhere, with the Pistons moving to Detroit, Michigan to become the Detroit Pistons, the Lakers moving from Minneapolis to Los Angeles to become the Los Angeles Lakers, and the Royals rebranding themselves multiple times and going from their original Rochester, New York location to Sacramento to become the Sacramento Kings.

== Draft picks ==
The Rochester Royals would participate in the 1947 NBL draft, which occurred right after the 1947 BAA draft due to a joint agreement the National Basketball League and the rivaling Basketball Association of America had with each other during the offseason period. However, as of 2026, no records of what the Royals' draft picks might have been for the NBL have properly come up, with any information on who those selections might have been being lost to time in the process.

== Roster ==
1947–48 Rochester Royals roster
Players

Pos.	No.	Player	Height	Weight	DOB	From
G/F		Bill Calhoun	6 ft 3 in (1.91 m)	180 lb (82 kg)	1927-11-04	CCSF
G/F		Al Cervi	5 ft 11 in (1.80 m)	170 lb (77 kg)	1917-02-12	East HS (NY)
G/F		Bob Davies	6 ft 1 in (1.85 m)	175 lb (79 kg)	1920-01-15	Seton Hall
F/C		Andy Duncan	6 ft 6 in (1.98 m)	188 lb (85 kg)	1922-04-17	William & Mary
G		Red Holzman	5 ft 10 in (1.78 m)	175 lb (79 kg)	1920-08-10	CCNY
F/C		Arnie Johnson	6 ft 5 in (1.96 m)	236 lb (107 kg)	1920-05-17	Bemidji State
C		Leroy King	6 ft 7 in (2.01 m)	200 lb (91 kg)	1921-12-24	Monmouth
G/F		Andrew Levane	6 ft 2 in (1.88 m)	190 lb (86 kg)	1920-04-11	St. John's
G		Joe Lord	6 ft 1 in (1.85 m)	175 lb (79 kg)	1922-12-28	Villanova
F/C		John Mandic	6 ft 4 in (1.93 m)	195 lb (88 kg)	1919-10-03	Oregon State
F/C		George Ratkovicz	6 ft 6 in (1.98 m)	220 lb (100 kg)	1922-11-13	Lindblom (IL)
F		Ocie Richie	6 ft 3 in (1.91 m)	195 lb (88 kg)	1921-11-16	Northwestern State
F/C		Arnie Risen	6 ft 9 in (2.06 m)	200 lb (91 kg)	1924-10-09	Ohio State
G		Bobby Wanzer	6 ft 0 in (1.83 m)	170 lb (77 kg)	1921-06-04	Seton Hall

Coaches
Head coach

Eddie Malanowicz &
Les Harrison

Legend
- (DP) Unsigned draft pick
- (FA) Free agent
- (S) Suspended
- Injured

Roster

Note: Leroy King, Joe Lord, and Ocie Richie were not a part of the playoff roster this season for one reason or another.

== Season standings ==
=== NBL Schedule ===
Not to be confused with exhibition or other non-NBL scheduled games that did not count towards Rochester's official NBL record for this season. An official database created by John Grasso detailing every NBL match possible (outside of two matches that the Kankakee Gallagher Trojans won over the Dayton Metropolitans in 1938) would be released in 2026 showcasing every team's official schedules throughout their time spent in the NBL. As such, these are the official results recorded for the Rochester Royals during their third and final season in the NBL before moving on to play in the BAA (now NBA) for their following season of play.

#	Date	Opponent	Score	Record
1	November 11	Oshkosh	78–68	1–0
2	November 13	@ Anderson	63–74	1–1
3	November 15	Oshkosh	79–52	2–1
4	November 18	@ Indianapolis	56–53	3–1
5	November 20	Flint	65–50	4–1
6	November 21	@ Syracuse	75–72	5–1
7	November 22	Syracuse	64–60	6–1
8	November 24	@ Anderson	58–75	6–2
9	November 25	@ Flint	76–54	7–2
10	November 26	@ Oshkosh	43–47	7–3
11	November 27	@ Toledo	41–50	7–4
12	November 29	Minneapolis	56–53	8–4
13	December 2	Anderson	78–54	9–4
14	December 3	N Sheboygan	72–54	10–4
15	December 6	Toledo	56–55	11–4
16	December 9	Sheboygan	73–58	12–4
17	December 10	@ Fort Wayne	62–58	13–4
18	December 13	Sheboygan	62–65 (OT)	14–4
19	December 14	@ Flint	78–63	15–4
20	December 18	Indianapolis	80–47	16–4
21	December 20	@ Fort Wayne	65–62 (OT)	17–4
22	December 21	N Oshkosh	65–50	18–4
23	December 23	@ Tri-Cities	59–58	19–4
24	December 25	@ Syracuse	61–60	20–4
25	December 27	Anderson	59–64	20–5
26	January 3	Tri-Cities	68–60	21–5
27	January 10	Toledo	65–74	21–6
28	January 13	Fort Wayne	75–48	22–6
29	January 14	@ Fort Wayne	70–56	22–7
30	January 18	Minneapolis	73–75	22–8
31	January 20	@ Indianapolis	58–56	23–8
32	January 22	N Minneapolis	64–69	23–9
33	January 24	Indianapolis	80–58	24–9
34	January 26	@ Minneapolis	58–76	24–10
35	January 28	@ Minneapolis	53–50	25–10
36	January 29	@ Toledo	52–51	26–10
37	January 31	Flint	89–72	27–10
38	February 5	@ Sheboygan	60–53	28–10
39	February 7	Oshkosh	63–54	29–10
40	February 8	@ Sheboygan	67–66 (2OT)	30–10
41	February 10	N Oshkosh	40–51	30–11
42	February 11	@ Fort Wayne	69–70	30–12
43	February 12	@ Anderson	56–57	30–13
44	February 14	Tri-Cities	55–60	30–14
45	February 17	Tri-Cities	78–64	31–14
46	February 19	@ Flint	56–51	32–14
47	February 20	@ Toledo	49–41	33–14
48	February 21	Flint	68–57	34–14
49	February 24	Syracuse	78–54	35–14
50	February 28	Syracuse	64–52	36–14
51	March 2	Toledo	66–50	37–14
52	March 4	@ Tri-Cities	64–53	38–14
53	March 6	Fort Wayne	64–61	39–14
54	March 7	N Indianapolis	61–46	40–14
55	March 9	@ Tri-Cities	50–67	40–15
56	March 11	@ Indianapolis	68–74	40–16
57	March 13	Anderson	57–50	41–16
58	March 16	Minneapolis	66–63	42–16
59	March 18	@ Syracuse	76–48	43–16
60	March 20	Sheboygan	83–44	44–16

=== Eastern standings ===
Pos.	Eastern Division	Wins	Losses	Win %
1	Rochester Royals	44	16	.733
2	Anderson Duffey Packers	42	18	.700
3	Fort Wayne Zollner Pistons	40	20	.667
4	Syracuse Nationals	24	36	.400
5	Toledo Jeeps	22	37	.373
6	Flint/Midland Dow A.C.'s^{‡}	8	52	.133
^{‡} Flint relocated to Midland during the season and assumed Flint's record in the standings. The Dow A.C.'s franchise got five of their wins out in Flint and three wins out in Midland. (It's unknown what the actual records for Flint's tenure and Midland's tenure were.)

== NBL Playoffs ==
=== NBL Eastern Division Opening Round ===
(1E) Rochester Royals vs. (3E) Fort Wayne Zollner Pistons: Rochester wins series 3–1

- Game 1: March 23, 1948 @ Fort Wayne: Rochester 65, Fort Wayne 56
- Game 2: March 24, 1948 @ Fort Wayne: Fort Wayne 68, Rochester 65
- Game 3: March 25, 1948 @ Rochester: Rochester 64, Fort Wayne 47
- Game 4: March 27, 1948 @ Rochester: Rochester 71, Fort Wayne 62

=== NBL Eastern Division Semifinals ===
(1E) Rochester Royals vs. (2E) Anderson Duffey Packers: Rochester wins series 2–1

- Game 1: March 30, 1948 @ Anderson: Rochester 71, Anderson 66
- Game 2: April 2, 1948 @ Rochester: Anderson 76, Rochester 69
- Game 3: April 3, 1948 @ Rochester: Rochester 74, Anderson 48

=== NBL Championship ===
(1E) Rochester Royals vs. (1W) Minneapolis Lakers: Minneapolis wins series 3–1

- Game 1: April 13, 1948 @ Minneapolis: Minneapolis 80, Rochester 72
- Game 2: April 14, 1948 @ Minneapolis: Minneapolis 82, Rochester 67
- Game 3: April 15, 1948 @ Rochester: Rochester 74, Minneapolis 60
- Game 4: April 18, 1948 @ Rochester: Minneapolis 75, Rochester 65

== Team statistics ==
=== Regular season ===
Rank	Player	Position	Games played	Field goals	Free throws made	Free throws attempted	Points per game
1	Al Cervi	G-F	49	4.8	3.8	4.9	13.4
2	Red Holzman	G	60	4.1	2.0	3.0	10.2
3	Andy Duncan	F-C	60	3.3	2.0	3.3	8.7
4	Bob Davies	G-F	48	3.7	2.5	3.3	9.8
5	Arnie Risen	C-F	28	5.2	4.2	5.8	14.5
6	Andrew Levane	F-G	54	2.7	0.8	1.1	6.3
7	Arnie Johnson	F-C	57	1.8	1.7	2.6	5.2
8	George Ratkovicz	C-F	234	1.5	1.4	2.2	4.4
9	Bobby Wanzer	G	40	1.4	1.4	1.7	4.2
10	Bill Calhoun	F-G	42	0.7	0.4	0.8	1.9
11	John Mandic	F-C	33	1.0	0.4	0.7	2.3
12	Leroy King	C	12	0.3	0.5	0.7	1.0
13	Joseph Lord	G	4	0.8	0.0	0.3	1.5
14	Ocie Richie	F	1	0.0	1.0	1.0	1.0

=== NBL Playoffs ===
Rank	Player	Position	Games played	Field goals	Free throws made	Free throws attempted	Points per game
1	Bob Davies	G-F	11	5.1	4.5	5.8	14.6
2	Andy Duncan	F-C	11	3.5	2.1	3.1	9.2
3	Arnie Risen	C-F	7	5.0	4.3	6.3	14.3
4	Red Holzman	G	10	3.5	1.0	1.5	8.0
5	Bobby Wanzer	G	11	1.9	2.2	2.5	6.0
6	Arnie Johnson	F-C	11	2.1	1.8	2.2	6.0
7	George Ratkovicz	C-F	60	2.0	1.5	2.5	5.5
8	Al Cervi	G-F	6	3.0	2.3	3.2	8.3
9	Andrew Levane	F-G	9	2.2	0.2	0.3	4.7
10	Bill Calhoun	F-G	8	1.4	0.3	0.4	3.0
11	John Mandic	F-C	5	0.4	0.4	0.8	1.2

== Awards and honors ==
- All-NBL First Team – Al Cervi and Red Holzman
- All-NBL Second Team – Bob Davies
- All-Time NBL Team – Al Cervi, Bob Davies, and Arnie Risen
