= 1947–48 Syracuse Nationals season =

NBL professional basketball team season

- Head coach: Bennie Borgmann (20–35); Emil Barboni (interim; 1–0); Danny Biasone (3–1)
- President: Danny Biasone
- General manager: George Mingin
- Owners: Danny Biasone (majority); George Mingin (minority)
- Arena: West Jefferson Street Armory

Results
- Record: 24–36 (.400)
- Place: Division: 4th (Eastern)
- Playoff finish: Lost NBL Eastern Division opening round to the Anderson Duffey Packers, 0–3
- Stats at Basketball Reference

The 1947–48 Syracuse Nationals season was the second season of the franchise in the National Basketball League. This season saw Bennie Borgmann return to the reigns of the head coach role for Syracuse after previously being let go from the head coach role near the end of the season and being replaced by both minority owner/general manager George Mingin on an interim basis and Jerry Rizzo as a player-coach for the rest of the season. Borgmann would once again continue to be the head coach for Syracuse for most of the season before randomly being let go of near the end of the season once again, with his replacements near the end of the season being leading team scout Emil Barboni under an interim basis for one game and majority team owner Danny Biasone for the rest of the season afterward. During this entire season, the Nationals would see themselves fight against the Toledo Jeeps for the final spot of the NBL Playoffs within the Eastern Division after the top three teams of the division that year in the Fort Wayne Zollner Pistons, Anderson Duffey Packers, and Rochester Royals all separated themselves from the rest of the pack early on in the season. While the Nationals ended up finishing the season with a losing record, they would end up taking the final Eastern Division playoff spot ahead of Toledo (who would later fold operations entirely following this season's end after both the Jeeps and the Oshkosh All-Stars failed to join the Fort Wayne Zollner Pistons, the Indianapolis Kautskys, the Minneapolis Lakers, and the Rochester Royals from the NBL to the newer rivaling BAA) that season, where they ended up going up against the #2 seeded Anderson Duffey Packers before ultimately getting swept by them 3–0 in the opening round of the NBL Playoffs.

== Draft picks ==
The Syracuse Nationals would participate in the 1947 NBL draft, which occurred right after the 1947 BAA draft due to a joint agreement the National Basketball League and the rivaling Basketball Association of America had with each other during the offseason period. However, as of 2026, no records of what the Nationals' draft picks might have been for the NBL have properly come up, with any information on who those selections might have been being lost to time in the process.

== Roster ==
1947–48 Syracuse Nationals roster
Players

Pos.	No.	Player	Height	Weight	DOB	From
F/C		Jim Homer	6 ft 5 in (1.96 m)	220 lb (100 kg)	1921-12-05	Alabama
F/C		Mike Novak	6 ft 9 in (2.06 m)	219 lb (99 kg)	1915-04-23	Loyola Chicago
G	50	Jerry Rizzo	5 ft 8 in (1.73 m)	150 lb (68 kg)	1918-03-12	Fordham
F/C		John Chaney	6 ft 3 in (1.91 m)	185 lb (84 kg)	1920-02-29	LSU
G/F		Steve Sharkey	6 ft 0 in (1.83 m)	190 lb (86 kg)	1918-12-30	Nott Terrace HS (NY)
G/F		Robert Kitterman	6 ft 0 in (1.83 m)	180 lb (82 kg)	1923-04-02	Southeastern CC (IA)
G/F		Paul Seymour	6 ft 1 in (1.85 m)	180 lb (82 kg)	1928-01-30	Toledo
G		George Nelmark	6 ft 1 in (1.85 m)	180 lb (82 kg)	1917-05-09	Truman State
F		John Abramovic	6 ft 3 in (1.91 m)	195 lb (88 kg)	1919-02-09	Salem
G/F		Edwin Oram	6 ft 3 in (1.91 m)	175 lb (79 kg)	1914-10-05	USC
G		Bob O'Shaughnessy	6 ft 0 in (1.83 m)	175 lb (79 kg)	1917-01-09	Nevada
F/C		Virgil Vaughn	6 ft 4 in (1.93 m)	205 lb (93 kg)	1918-05-15	Western Kentucky
G/F		Chick Meehan	6 ft 1 in (1.85 m)	195 lb (88 kg)	1917-01-09	Christian Brothers Academy (NY)
G		William DeVenzio	6 ft 0 in (1.83 m)	185 lb (84 kg)	1924-08-02	Eastern Kentucky
G		Garland O'Shields	6 ft 1 in (1.85 m)	195 lb (88 kg)	1921-05-23	Tennessee
G/F		Roy Hurley	6 ft 2 in (1.88 m)	170 lb (77 kg)	1922-08-12	Arsenal Tech HS (IN)
F/C		Bob Fitzgerald	6 ft 5 in (1.96 m)	190 lb (86 kg)	1923-03-14	Seton Hall
G		Johnny Sebastian	6 ft 0 in (1.83 m)	185 lb (84 kg)	1921-11-20	Southern Illinois
G		Ken Walters	6 ft 0 in (1.83 m)	170 lb (77 kg)	1922-04-29	Ohio University

Coaches
Head coach

Bennie Borgmann
Emil Barboni
Danny Biasone

Legend
- (DP) Unsigned draft pick
- (FA) Free agent
- (S) Suspended
- Injured

Roster

Note: Nearly half of the roster would not be a part of the playoff roster this season, as William DeVenzio, Bob Fitzgerald, Roy Hurley, Chick Meehan, Bob O'Shaughnessy, Garland O'Shields, Edwin Oram, Johnny Sebastian, and Ken Walters were not a part of the playoff roster for one reason or another.

== Season standings ==
=== Eastern Division standings ===
Pos.	Eastern Division	Wins	Losses	Win %
1	Rochester Royals	44	16	.733
2	Anderson Duffey Packers	42	18	.700
3	Fort Wayne Zollner Pistons	40	20	.667
4	Syracuse Nationals	24	36	.400
5	Toledo Jeeps	22	37	.373
6	Flint/Midland Dow A.C.'s^{‡}	8	52	.133
^{‡} Flint relocated to Midland during the season and assumed Flint's record in the standings. The Dow A.C.'s franchise got five of their wins out in Flint and three wins out in Midland. (It's unknown what the actual records for Flint's tenure and Midland's tenure were.)

=== NBL Schedule ===
Not to be confused with exhibition or other non-NBL scheduled games that did not count towards Syracuse's official NBL record for this season. An official database created by John Grasso detailing every NBL match possible (outside of two matches that the Kankakee Gallagher Trojans won over the Dayton Metropolitans in 1938) would be released in 2026 showcasing every team's official schedules throughout their time spent in the NBL. As such, these are the official results recorded for the Syracuse Nationals during their second season in the NBL.

#	Date	Opponent	Score	Record
1	November 8	Fort Wayne	51–52	0–1
2	November 13	Oshkosh	65–59	1–1
3	November 14	Oshkosh	46–56	1–2
4	November 15	N Tri-Cities	73–72	2–2
5	November 16	@ Tri-Cities	56–69	2–3
6	November 18	Flint	66–51	3–3
7	November 21	Rochester	72–75	3–4
8	November 22	@ Rochester	60–64	3–5
9	November 27	Minneapolis	72–66	4–5
10	November 29	Toledo	59–48	5–5
11	December 4	Anderson	64–65	5–6
12	December 6	Sheboygan	63–47	6–6
13	December 11	Sheboygan	53–58	6–7
14	December 13	@ Flint (Midland)	64–55	7–7
15	December 14	N Fort Wayne	47–58	7–8
16	December 15	@ Anderson	53–72	7–9
17	December 16	@ Indianapolis	72–80	7–10
18	December 17	@ Toledo	54–72	7–11
19	December 19	Indianapolis	47–37	8–11
20	December 25	Rochester	60–61	8–12
21	December 27	N Indianapolis	64–53	9–12
22	December 28	@ Tri-Cities	43–53	9–13
23	December 30	@ Tri-Cities	57–65	9–14
24	January 1	Tri-Cities	45–50	9–15
25	January 3	Sheboygan	57–45	10–15
26	January 8	Minneapolis	59–68	10–16
27	January 15	Indianapolis	53–51	11–16
28	January 17	Minneapolis	71–65 (OT)	12–16
29	January 22	Anderson	52–59	12–17
30	January 29	Fort Wayne	55–69	12–18
31	January 31	@ Toledo	48–58	12–19
32	February 2	@ Flint	67–65 (OT)	13–19
33	February 4	@ Minneapolis	55–70	13–20
34	February 5	@ Minneapolis	55–69	13–21
35	February 8	N Fort Wayne	52–62	13–22
36	February 9	@ Anderson	47–53	13–23
37	February 11	N Indianapolis	53–57	13–24
38	February 12	@ Tri-Cities	69–60	14–24
39	February 13	Fort Wayne	49–64	14–25
40	February 15	N Oshkosh	75–62	15–25
41	February 16	N Sheboygan	58–78	15–26
42	February 18	@ Oshkosh	65–77	15–27
43	February 19	@ Sheboygan	56–74	15–28
44	February 20	N Oshkosh	87–80	16–28
45	February 21	@ Oshkosh	58–62	16–29
46	February 22	@ Sheboygan	75–69	17–29
47	February 24	@ Rochester	54–78	17–30
48	February 26	Indianapolis	83–60	18–30
49	February 28	@ Rochester	52–64	18–31
50	February 29	N Minneapolis	56–66	32–18
51	March 1	@ Toledo	59–55	19–32
52	March 4	Toledo	45–49	19–33
53	March 7	@ Fort Wayne	48–70	19–34
54	March 8	@ Anderson	62–99	19–35
55	March 10	@ Flint	71–59	20–35
56	March 11	@ Toledo	48–45	21–35
57	March 13	Flint/Midland	90–71	22–35
58	March 16	Anderson	54–45	23–35
59	March 18	Rochester	48–76	23–36
60	March 20	Flint/Midland	66–60	24–36

== NBL Playoffs ==
=== NBL Eastern Division Opening Round ===
(4E) Syracuse Nationals vs. (2E) Anderson Duffey Packers: Anderson wins series 3–0

- Game 1: March 23, 1948 @ Anderson: Anderson 73, Syracuse 56
- Game 2: March 24, 1948 @ Anderson: Anderson 72, Syracuse 54
- Game 3: March 27, 1948 @ Syracuse: Rochester 79, Syracuse 68
