= 1947–48 Fort Wayne Zollner Pistons season =

Seventh season of the Pistons in the NBL

- Head coach: Carl Bennett
- Owner: Fred Zollner
- Arena: North Side High School Gym, Fort Wayne, Indiana

Results
- Record: 40–20 (.667)
- Place: Division: 3rd (Eastern)
- Playoff finish: Lost Eastern Division opening round to Rochester Royals, 3–1
- Stats at Basketball Reference

The 1947–48 Fort Wayne Zollner Pistons season was the seventh season of the franchise in the National Basketball League (NBL). It would be the final season that the franchise would play in the NBL, as well as the final season with the Zollner name representing team owner Fred Zollner and his company name being included in the team name; following the conclusion of this season, in spite of Ned Irish having a dim view on a team from Fort Wayne, Indiana joining his team's league, the Zollner Pistons would join the newest NBL champions in the Minneapolis Lakers, their newest NBL rivals in the Rochester Royals (who turned out to only remain as competitive rivals while out in the NBL), and the Indianapolis Kautskys (who ended up rebranding themselves to the Indianapolis Jets immediately upon entry, though only lasted for one season there themselves) in order to play in the Basketball Association of America (now known as the National Basketball Association), starting in the 1948–49 BAA season, though the Pistons would remove the Zollner part of their team name due to that league not allowing sponsorships being a part of their team names. This was also the last season in Fort Wayne for both Blackie Towery and Jake Pelkington, who had both decided to leave the team prior to the start of the next season out in the BAA.

Throughout the entire season, the Zollner Pistons would struggle trying to catch up with the two best teams in their entire division, the Rochester Royals and the Anderson Duffey Packers, due to them being both an older and smaller team than those two franchises. However, Fred Zollner would try his best to make sure his team didn't fall behind the rest of the pack by picking up rookies Ralph Hamilton and Jack Smiley early on in the season, as well as Milo Komenich later on in the season in order to help out with those woes. Despite his best efforts, the early struggles in the season combined with the missing presence of their star veteran players from their earlier NBL days would ultimately doom Fort Wayne to a third-place finish in the Eastern Division (meaning they still qualified for the NBL Playoffs yet again, but had to go up against the #1 seeded Rochester Royals in the process instead of hoping to move up for the more desirable #4 seeded Syracuse Nationals). From there, the Zollner Pistons would end their run in the NBL with an Eastern Division opening round elimination by being defeated 3–1 to the Rochester Royals in the quarterfinal round of the playoffs.

== Draft picks ==
The Fort Wayne Zollner Pistons would participate in the 1947 NBL draft, which occurred right after the 1947 BAA draft due to a joint agreement the National Basketball League and the rivaling Basketball Association of America had with each other during the offseason period. However, as of 2026, no records of what the Zollner Pistons' draft picks might have been for the NBL have properly come up, with any information on who those selections might have been being lost to time in the process.

== Roster ==
1947–48 Fort Wayne Zollner Pistons roster
Players

Pos.	No.	Player	Height	Weight	DOB	From
G/F	31	Curly Armstrong	5 ft 11 in (1.80 m)	170 lb (77 kg)	1918-11-01	Indiana
G/F	25	Ralph Hamilton	6 ft 1 in (1.85 m)	188 lb (85 kg)	1921-06-10	Indiana
F/C	32	Bob Kinney	6 ft 6 in (1.98 m)	215 lb (98 kg)	1920-09-16	Rice
G/F	27	Walt Kirk	6 ft 3 in (1.91 m)	173 lb (78 kg)	1924-09-03	Illinois
F/C	16	Milo Komenich	6 ft 7 in (2.01 m)	212 lb (96 kg)	1920-06-22	Wyoming
G	29	Ken Menke	6 ft 0 in (1.83 m)	168 lb (76 kg)	1922-10-02	Illinois
G/F	23	Richie Niemiera	6 ft 1 in (1.85 m)	165 lb (75 kg)	1921-05-26	Notre Dame
F/C	30	Jake Pelkington	6 ft 6 in (1.98 m)	220 lb (100 kg)	1916-01-03	Manhattan
G/F	22	Jack Smiley	6 ft 3 in (1.91 m)	190 lb (86 kg)	1922-12-22	Illinois
G/F	20	Bob Tough	6 ft 0 in (1.83 m)	185 lb (84 kg)	1920-08-28	St. John's
F/C	24	Carlisle Towery	6 ft 4 in (1.93 m)	210 lb (95 kg)	1920-06-20	Western Kentucky
G/F	28	Dick Triptow	6 ft 0 in (1.83 m)	170 lb (77 kg)	1922-11-03	DePaul

Coaches
Head coach

Carl Bennett

Legend
- (DP) Unsigned draft pick
- (FA) Free agent
- (S) Suspended
- Injured

Roster

Note: Milo Komenich was not a part of the playoff roster for this season.

== Regular season ==
=== NBL Schedule ===
Not to be confused with exhibition or other non-NBL scheduled games that did not count towards Fort Wayne's official NBL record for this season. An official database created by John Grasso detailing every NBL match possible (outside of two matches that the Kankakee Gallagher Trojans won over the Dayton Metropolitans in 1938) would be released in 2026 showcasing every team's official schedules throughout their time spent in the NBL. As such, these are the official results recorded for the Fort Wayne Zollner Pistons during their seventh and final season in the NBL before moving on to play in the BAA (now NBA) for their following season of play.

#	Date	Opponent	Score	Record
1	November 6	@ Sheboygan	49–45	1–0
2	November 8	@ Syracuse	52–51	2–0
3	November 9	Indianapolis	62–69	2–1
4	November 14	@ Toledo	59–53	3–1
5	November 16	Flint	64–54	4–1
6	November 20	@ Anderson	69–82	4–2
7	November 23	Toledo	62–49	5–2
8	November 30	Indianapolis	67–56	6–2
9	December 2	@ Indianapolis	45–40	7–2
10	December 3	Minneapolis	58–68	7–3
11	December 4	N Minneapolis	42–56	7–4
12	December 7	Tri-Cities	63–49	8–4
13	December 10	Rochester	58–62	8–5
14	December 12	N Minneapolis	60–55	9–5
15	December 14	N Syracuse	58–47	10–5
16	December 18	@ Flint	71–74	10–6
17	December 19	@ Toledo	50–55	10–7
18	December 20	Rochester	62–65 (OT)	10–8
19	December 21	Anderson	58–52	11–8
20	December 26	@ Indianapolis	58–60	11–9
21	December 28	Oshkosh	51–41	12–9
22	January 2	@ Minneapolis	46–41	13–9
23	January 4	Sheboygan	61–50	14–9
24	January 7	@ Oshkosh	61–59	15–9
25	January 8	@ Sheboygan	66–47	16–9
26	January 11	Anderson	57–54	17–9
27	January 13	@ Rochester	48–75	17–10
28	January 14	Rochester	70–56	18–10
29	January 18	Toledo	54–49	19–10
30	January 20	@ Tri-Cities	69–79	19–11
31	January 22	Flint	67–59	20–11
32	January 24	@ Minneapolis	52–69	20–12
33	January 25	Indianapolis	71–56	21–12
34	January 26	@ Anderson	55–70	21–13
35	January 29	@ Syracuse	69–55	22–13
36	February 1	Tri-Cities	52–48	23–13
37	February 3	@ Toledo	57–59	23–14
38	February 5	N Flint	74–57	24–14
39	February 8	N Syracuse	62–52	25–14
40	February 10	@ Indianapolis	73–65	26–14
41	February 11	Rochester	70–69	27–14
42	February 13	@ Syracuse	64–49	28–14
43	February 15	Anderson	51–47	29–14
44	February 18	@ Flint	59–57 (OT)	30–14
45	February 19	@ Anderson	65–69	30–15
46	February 22	Toledo	49–41	31–15
47	February 25	@ Oshkosh	57–58 (OT)	31–16
48	February 26	@ Sheboygan	55–49	32–16
49	February 27	@ Tri-Cities	68–66	33–16
50	February 29	Sheboygan	68–50	34–16
51	March 3	Oshkosh	59–45	35–16
52	March 6	@ Rochester	61–64	35–17
53	March 7	Syracuse	70–48	36–17
54	March 8	@ Flint	55–51	37–17
55	March 10	Sheboygan	62–53	38–17
56	March 13	@ Minneapolis	64–92	38–18
57	March 14	Oshkosh	62–46	39–18
58	March 17	Tri-Cities	74–56	40–18
59	March 19	@ Tri-Cities	55–72	40–19
60	March 20	@ Oshkosh	42–58	40–20

=== League standings ===
==== Eastern Division ====
Pos.	Eastern Division	Wins	Losses	Win %
1	Rochester Royals	44	16	.733
2	Anderson Duffey Packers	42	18	.700
3	Fort Wayne Zollner Pistons	40	20	.667
4	Syracuse Nationals	24	36	.400
5	Toledo Jeeps	22	37	.373
6	Flint/Midland Dow A.C.'s^{‡}	8	52	.133
^{‡} Flint relocated to Midland during the season and assumed Flint's record in the standings. The Dow A.C.'s franchise got five of their wins out in Flint and three wins out in Midland. (It's unknown what the actual records for Flint's tenure and Midland's tenure were.)

==== Western Division ====
Pos.	Western Division	Wins	Losses	Win %
1	Minneapolis Lakers	43	17	.717
2	Tri-Cities Blackhawks	30	30	.500
3	Oshkosh All-Stars	29	31	.483
4	Indianapolis Kautskys	24	35	.407
5	Sheboygan Red Skins	23	37	.383

== NBL Playoffs ==
=== NBL Eastern Division Opening Round ===
(3E) Fort Wayne Zollner Pistons vs. (1E) Rochester Royals: Rochester wins series 3–1

- Game 1: March 23, 1948 @ Fort Wayne: Rochester 65, Fort Wayne 56
- Game 2: March 24, 1948 @ Fort Wayne: Fort Wayne 68, Rochester 65
- Game 3: March 25, 1948 @ Rochester: Rochester 64, Fort Wayne 47
- Game 4: March 27, 1948 @ Rochester: Rochester 71, Fort Wayne 62

=== Awards and honors ===
- NBL All-Rookie Second Team – Ralph Hamilton

== World Professional Basketball Tournament ==
For the eighth and final year in a row (seventh and final year in a row while representing the NBL), the Fort Wayne Zollner Pistons would participate in the annual World Professional Basketball Tournament in Chicago, which saw the final event ever being held on April 8–11, 1948 and consisted mostly of teams from the National Basketball League alongside the Wilkes-Barre Barons from the American Basketball League (who saw themselves go up against the defending NBL champion Minneapolis Lakers) and two independently ran teams in the New York Renaissance and Bridgeport Newfields, who competed against each other in the first round of the event. For Fort Wayne, their quarterfinal match-up saw them go up against the Tri-Cities Blackhawks, who had since gotten more acclimated to their new home area following their sudden movement from Buffalo, New York to Moline, Illinois representing what was then known as the Tri-Cities area back in Christmas 1946. While the Zollner Pistons had more experience in the tournament, the Blackhawks had greater leadership in tow due to former Fort Wayne player Bobby McDermott being the player-coach of the Tri-Cities squad, as the Blackhawks managed to upset the Zollner Pistons 57–50 in what ultimately became the Zollner Pistons' final game ever played in the WPBT, while the Tri-Cities Blackhawks squad would go to the semifinal round and face off against the New York Renaissance independent team instead.

=== Game Played ===
- Lost first round (50–57) to the Tri-Cities Blackhawks
