= Ocie Richie =

American basketball player (1921–2012)

Personal information
- Born: November 16, 1921 Natchitoches, Louisiana, U.S.
- Died: February 5, 2012 (aged 90) Jennings, Louisiana, U.S.
- Listed height: 6 ft 3 in (1.91 m)
- Listed weight: 195 lb (88 kg)

Career information
- College: Arkansas (1944–1945); Northwestern State (1945–1947)
- Position: Forward

Career history

Playing
- 1947: Rochester Royals
- 1947–1948: Memphis Legionnaires
- 1947–1948: Mobile Bears
- 1952–1953: Cobb's Barbeque
- 1953–1954: Flying Red Horses

Coaching
- 1947–1948: Memphis Legionnaires

Ocie Eldridge Richie (November 16, 1921 – February 5, 2012) was an American professional basketball player. He played for the Rochester Royals in the National Basketball League for one game during the 1946–47 season. He also competed in the Southern Professional Basketball League for various teams, even serving as the player-coach for much of the Memphis Legionnaires' 1947–48 team.

Richie played one year of basketball for the University of Arkansas, and two years in both basketball and track for Northwestern State University. In 1980, he was inducted into Northwestern State's Hall of Fame.
