= Leroy King =

American basketball player (1921–2004)

Leroy O. King
Personal information
- Born: December 24, 1921 Greeley, Colorado
- Died: August 8, 2004 (aged 82) Fountain Valley, California
- Listed height: 6 ft 7 in (2.01 m)
- Listed weight: 200 lb (91 kg)

Career information
- College: Monmouth (Illinois) (1943–1945); Northwestern (1945–1946)
- Position: Center

Career history
- 1946–1947: Continental Airlines
- 1947–1948: Rochester Royals
- 1947–1948: West Bend
- 1948–1949: Chicago Shamrocks

Career highlights
- Honorable mention All-Big Ten (1946)

Leroy Oliver King (December 24, 1921 – August 8, 2004) was an American professional basketball player. He played for the Rochester Royals in the National Basketball League during the 1947–48 season and averaged 1.0 points per game.
