= Ed Bogdanski =

American basketball player

Personal information
- Born: July 30, 1921 Chicago, Illinois
- Died: December 31, 1989 (aged 68)
- Listed height: 6 ft 4 in (1.93 m)
- Listed weight: 220 lb (100 kg)

Career information
- High school: Wells Community Academy (Chicago, Illinois)
- College: DePaul (1940–1941, 1946–1947)
- Position: Forward

Career history
- 1941–1943: Division Street Clippers
- 1947–1948: Indianapolis Kautskys

Edward Eugene Bogdanski (July 30, 1921 – December 31, 1989) was an American professional basketball player. He played for the Indianapolis Kautskys in the National Basketball League during the 1947–48 season and averaged 1.7 points per game.
