= Bob Skarda =

American basketball player

Personal information
- Born: November 28, 1925 New York City, New York, U.S.
- Died: February 15, 1994 (aged 68) Indiantown, Florida, U.S.
- Listed height: 6 ft 3 in (1.91 m)
- Listed weight: 190 lb (86 kg)

Career information
- High school: Stuyvesant (New York City, New York)
- College: Tufts (1944–1946)
- Position: Guard / forward

Career history
- 1947–1948: Montgomery Rebels
- 1948: Tri-Cities Blackhawks

Robert Joseph Skarda (November 28, 1925 – February 15, 1994) was an American professional basketball player. He appeared in six games for the Tri-Cities Blackhawks in the National Basketball League during the 1947–48 season.
