= 1947–48 Anderson Duffey Packers season =

NBL professional basketball team season

- Head coach: Murray Mendenhall
- Owner(s): Ike W. Duffey; John B. Duffey; Duffey's Meat Packing, Inc.
- Arena: Anderson High School Wigwam

Results
- Record: 42–18 (.700)
- Place: Division: 2nd (Eastern)
- Playoff finish: Lost Eastern Division Finals to Rochester Royals, 2–1

The 1947–48 Anderson Duffey Packers season was the second professional season of play for the Duffey Packers in the small city of Anderson, Indiana under the National Basketball League, which officially was the eleventh season that it existed as a professional basketball league after previously existing as a semi-pro or amateur basketball league called the Midwest Basketball Conference in its first two seasons back in 1935. However, if you include their only season of independent play as the Anderson Chiefs (which sometimes got their team name expanded out more into being the Chief Anderson Meat Packers at times due to their affiliation with the local meat packing business called Duffey's Incorporated that was owned by brothers Ike W. and John B. Duffey, who subsequently owned and operated the team as well) before joining the NBL, this would also be their third overall season of play. Following the permanent move of the Buffalo Bisons to Moline, Illinois to become the Tri-Cities Blackhawks for the rest of their existence in the NBL, the Anderson Duffey Packers would switch divisions from the stronger-looking Western Division to the more top heavy Eastern Division due to their alignment being close to the Fort Wayne Zollner Pistons. As a result of this change alongside a few other movements within the NBL, eleven teams would officially compete in the NBL for the 1947–48 season, which comprised six teams in the Eastern Division and five teams in the Western Division.

Unlike their previous season, where they made a failed attempt to make it to the NBL Playoffs in a stacked Western Division, the Anderson Duffey Packers would end up proving themselves as one of the three elite teams of the Eastern Division this season alongside the Rochester Royals and Fort Wayne Zollner Pistons. Not only that, but for the majority of the season, Anderson would showcase themselves as the best team of the entire team for not just the division, but also the entire NBL as well, even above both the Minneapolis Lakers (who rebranded themselves from the prior Detroit Gems franchise the previous season) and the Rochester Royals in terms of records at times. However, near the end of the season, the Duffey Packers would fall behind and ultimately falter up the best record in both the Eastern Division and the entire NBL to the Rochester Royals, with Anderson settling for second place and an opening round playoff match against the #4 seeded Syracuse Nationals instead. While Anderson would win Syracuse in the opening round, they would ultimately lose in the Eastern Division Semifinals to the Rochester Royals 2–1, thus failing to avenge their stolen regular season spot from the end of the season. Despite the disappointing finish, returning head coach Murray Mendenhall would still be named the NBL's Coach of the Year, with rookie guard/forward Frank Brian making it to the All-NBL Second Team as well.

In addition to that, the Anderson Duffey Packers would compete in the 1948 World Professional Basketball Tournament, which would be the final World Professional Basketball Tournament ever held. By that point in time, the WPBT would essentially devolve into a pseudo-NBL tournament of sorts where only eight teams (a majority of whom were from the NBL) would compete in a single-game elimination, winner-takes-all format to determine the best professional basketball team around, with a consolation third place game being determined as well. Anderson would first win against the defending WPBT champions, the Indianapolis Kautskys, through a 59–53 victory, before they ended up losing to the eventual champions in both the NBL season and final WPBT event, the Minneapolis Lakers, in a close 59–56 defeat, leading to the Duffey Packers going to the final consolation third place match-up ever held against the Tri-Cities Blackhawks instead. From there, Anderson would rout the Tri-Cities in the second half with great shooting on their ends to blow them out in a 66–44 victory to win the final third place match ever held there.

== Draft picks ==
The Anderson Duffey Packers would participate in the 1947 NBL draft, which occurred right after the 1947 BAA draft due to a joint agreement the National Basketball League and the rivaling Basketball Association of America had with each other during the offseason period. However, as of 2026, no records of what the Duffey Packers' draft picks might have been for the NBL have properly come up, with any information on who those selections might have been being lost to time in the process.

== Roster ==
1947–48 Anderson Duffey Packers roster
Players

Pos.	No.	Player	Height	Weight	DOB	From
F/C	10	Charles B. Black	6 ft 5 in (1.96 m)	200 lb (91 kg)	1921–06–15	Kansas
C	14	Wally Borrevik	6 ft 8 in (2.03 m)	205 lb (93 kg)	1921–11–14	Oregon
G	2	Frank Brian	6 ft 1 in (1.85 m)	180 lb (82 kg)	1923–05–01	LSU
G/F	3	Price Brookfield	6 ft 4 in (1.93 m)	185 lb (84 kg)	1920–05–11	Iowa State
G/F	—	Dick Furey	6 ft 3 in (1.91 m)	195 lb (88 kg)	1925–03–08	St. Thomas (MN)
G/F	6	John Hargis	6 ft 2 in (1.88 m)	180 lb (82 kg)	1920–08–20	Texas
G	4	Boag Johnson	5 ft 11 in (1.80 m)	170 lb (77 kg)	1921–12–06	Huntington
F/C	16	Milo Komenich	6 ft 7 in (2.01 m)	212 lb (96 kg)	1920–06–22	Wyoming
F	7	Howie Schultz	6 ft 6 in (1.98 m)	200 lb (91 kg)	1922–07–03	Hamline
G/F	8	Rollie Seltz	5 ft 10 in (1.78 m)	165 lb (75 kg)	1924–01–25	Hamline
G/F	5	Charley Shipp	6 ft 1 in (1.85 m)	200 lb (91 kg)	1913–12–03	Catholic
C	12	Jim Springer	6 ft 9 in (2.06 m)	235 lb (107 kg)	1925–10–22	Canterbury
G	15	Ed Stanczak	6 ft 1 in (1.85 m)	185 lb (84 kg)	1921–08–15	Central HS (IN)

Coaches
Head coach
- Murray Mendenhall

Legend
- (DP) Unsigned draft pick
- (FA) Free agent
- (S) Suspended
- Injured

Roster

Note: Wally Borrevik, Dick Furey, and Jim Springer were not on the playoff roster.

== Regular season ==
=== Season standings ===
Pos.	Eastern Division	Wins	Losses	Win %
1	Rochester Royals	44	16	.733
2	Anderson Duffey Packers	42	18	.700
3	Fort Wayne Zollner Pistons	40	20	.667
4	Syracuse Nationals	24	36	.400
5	Toledo Jeeps	22	37	.373
6	Flint/Midland Dow A.C.'s^{‡}	8	52	.133
^{‡} Flint relocated to Midland during the season and assumed Flint's record in the standings. The Dow A.C.'s franchise got five of their wins out in Flint and three wins out in Midland. (It's unknown what the actual records for Flint's tenure and Midland's tenure were.)

=== NBL Schedule ===
Not to be confused with exhibition or other non-NBL scheduled games that did not count towards Anderson's official NBL record for this season. An official database created by John Grasso detailing every NBL match possible (outside of two matches that the Kankakee Gallagher Trojans won over the Dayton Metropolitans in 1938) would be released in 2026 showcasing every team's official schedules throughout their time spent in the NBL. As such, these are the official results recorded for the Anderson Duffey Packers during their second season in the NBL.

#	Date	Opponent	Score	Record
1	November 3	Oshkosh	71–58	1–0
2	November 6	Flint	73–63	2–0
3	November 10	Sheboygan	77–43	3–0
4	November 13	Rochester	74–63	4–0
5	November 17	Tri-Cities	79–66	5–0
6	November 20	Fort Wayne	82–69	6–0
7	November 23	@ Tri-Cities	52–68	6–1
8	November 24	Rochester	75–58	7–1
9	November 27	@ Sheboygan	64–40	8–1
10	November 29	@ Oshkosh	59–69	8–2
11	December 2	@ Rochester	54–78	8–3
12	December 4	@ Syracuse	65–64	9–3
13	December 5	@ Toledo	71–55	10–3
14	December 6	N Minneapolis	58–74	10–4
15	December 7	@ Flint	66–64	11–4
16	December 8	Indianapolis	62–54	12–4
17	December 14	@ Minneapolis	49–60	12–5
18	December 15	Syracuse	72–53	13–5
19	December 17	@ Minneapolis	57–53	14–5
20	December 18	@ Tri-Cities	42–41	15–5
21	December 21	@ Fort Wayne	52–58	15–6
22	December 23	@ Indianapolis	52–55	15–7
23	December 27	@ Rochester	64–59	16–7
24	December 28	@ Flint	74–71	17–7
25	December 30	Toledo	71–58	18–7
26	January 2	@ Indianapolis	72–66	19–7
27	January 5	@ Sheboygan	62–61	20–7
28	January 8	Tri-Cities	83–57	21–7
29	January 10	@ Oshkosh	52–58	21–8
30	January 11	@ Fort Wayne	54–57	21–9
31	January 12	Oshkosh	71–54	22–9
32	January 14	@ Oshkosh	67–64	23–9
33	January 15	Flint	82–54	24–9
34	January 19	Toledo	76–50	25–9
35	January 22	@ Syracuse	59–52	26–9
36	January 26	Fort Wayne	70–55	27–9
37	January 29	@ Sheboygan	70–65	28–9
38	January 31	@ Tri-Cities	70–60	29–9
39	February 2	Toledo	38–42	29–10
40	February 3	N Oshkosh	72–61	30–10
41	February 5	Indianapolis	73–54	31–10
42	February 7	@ Toledo	53–69	31–11
43	February 8	@ Flint	62–52	32–11
44	February 9	Syracuse	53–47	33–11
45	February 12	Rochester	57–56	34–11
46	February 15	@ Fort Wayne	47–51	34–12
47	February 16	Minneapolis	54–63	34–13
48	February 19	Fort Wayne	69–65	35–13
49	February 25	@ Minneapolis	54–60	35–14
50	February 27	N Sheboygan	71–46	36–14
51	March 1	Tri-Cities	75–68	37–14
52	March 4	Minneapolis	73–70	38–14
53	March 6	@ Toledo	56–58	38–15
54	March 8	Syracuse	99–62	39–15
55	March 9	@ Indianapolis	64–76	39–16
56	March 11	@ Flint	71–51	40–16
57	March 12	@ Rochester	50–57	40–17
58	March 16	@ Syracuse	45–54	40–18
59	March 17	@ Indianapolis	79–77	41–18
60	March 18	Sheboygan	80–76	42–18

== NBL Playoffs ==
=== NBL Eastern Division Opening Round ===
(2E) Anderson Duffey Packers vs. (4E) Syracuse Nationals: Anderson wins series 3–0

- Game 1: March 23, 1948 @ Anderson: Anderson 73, Syracuse 56
- Game 2: March 24, 1948 @ Anderson: Anderson 72, Syracuse 54
- Game 3: March 27, 1948 @ Syracuse: Anderson 79, Syracuse 68

=== NBL Eastern Division Semifinals ===
(2E) Anderson Duffey Packers vs. (1E) Rochester Royals: Rochester wins series 2–1

- Game 1: March 30, 1948 @ Anderson: Rochester 71, Anderson 66
- Game 2: April 2, 1948 @ Rochester: Anderson 76, Rochester 69
- Game 3: April 3, 1948 @ Rochester: Rochester 74, Anderson 48

== Awards and honors ==
- NBL Coach of the Year Award – Murray Mendenhall
- All-NBL Second Team – Frank Brian
- NBL All-Rookie First Team – Frank Brian
- NBL All-Rookie Second Team – Charles B. Black
- NBL All-Time Team – Charley Shipp

== World Professional Basketball Tournament ==
For the third and final time in franchise history (second and final time while using the Anderson Duffey Packers name), shortly prior to the NBL Finals beginning, during the days of April 8–11, 1948, the Anderson Duffey Packers would participate in the World Professional Basketball Tournament in Chicago (this time feeling much more comfortable with their position as a franchise than they were the previous season), with the final event ever held seeing the final eight teams participating mostly consisting of teams from the National Basketball League for a change of pace, with the only other professional team competing being the Wilkes-Barre Barons of the American Basketball League (who competed against the technically newly formed Minneapolis Lakers in the quarterfinal round) and the only two independently ran teams being the New York Renaissance and the Bridgeport Newfields, who competed against each other in the quarterfinal round. For the Anderson Duffey Packers, their quarterfinal round opponent would be the team that won the previous year's event, the Indianapolis Kautskys. Unlike the previous year's team, the Kautskys would end up being like every other version of the franchise that participated in the WPBT, where they would end up losing in the first round with a 59–53 victory for Anderson, meaning the Duffey Packers would enter the semifinal round and end the Kautskys' run for a repeat championship early.

For the semifinal round, Anderson would go up against George Mikan and the Minneapolis Lakers, the Western Division champions of the NBL. While the Duffey Packers would put up a good fight in this round, their best in that match just would not be good enough, as the Lakers would defeat Anderson 59–56, meaning the Duffey Packers would compete in the final third place consolation prize round of the WPBT's history instead of the final championship round of the tournament. In that specific match, Anderson's scoring leaders were Frank Brian with 13 points and John Hargis with 11 points.

For the final third place consolation prize match in WPBT history, the Duffey Packers saw themselves go up against the Tri-Cities Blackhawks, missing out on facing off against the inaugural WPBT champions, the all-black New York Renaissance entirely. Despite the Tri-Cities keeping things close with Anderson throughout the first half of the game (being tied 27–27 by halftime), the Duffey Packers would heat up their scoring progress within the second half of the game to blow out the Blackhawks with a 66–44 victory, with Boag Johnson and Rollie Seltz leading the charge for 39 second half points for the entire team. Following the tournament's conclusion, Charley Shipp would be named a member of the All-Tournament First Team, while both Howie Schultz and John Hargis were named members of the All-Tournament Second Team.

=== Scores ===
- Won quarterfinal round (59–53) over the Indianapolis Kautskys
- Lost semifinal round (56–59) to the Minneapolis Lakers
- Won third place consolation prize match (66–44) over the Tri-Cities Blackhawks

=== Awards and honors ===
- Charley Shipp, All-Tournament First Team
- Howie Schultz, All-Tournament Second Team
- John Hargis, All-Tournament Second Team
