= Bob Kitterman =

American basketball player

Personal information
- Born: April 2, 1923 Ottumwa, Iowa
- Died: November 14, 2000 (aged 77) Guthrie Center, Iowa
- Listed height: 6 ft 0 in (1.83 m)
- Listed weight: 180 lb (82 kg)

Career information
- High school: Burlington (Burlington, Iowa)
- College: Southeastern CC (1941–1942)
- Position: Guard / forward

Career history
- 1945–1946: Worcester
- 1945–1947: Fitchburg PAMCOs
- 1947–1948: Syracuse Nationals
- 1948–1949: Fitchburg Irish-Americans

Robert Eugene Kitterman (April 2, 1923 – November 14, 2000) was an American professional basketball player. He played for the Syracuse Nationals in the National Basketball League during the 1947–48 season and averaged 5.0 points per game.
