= Keith Carey =

American basketball player (1920–1999)

Personal information
- Born: March 5, 1920 Charlevoix, Michigan
- Died: February 15, 1999 (aged 78) Cincinnati, Ohio
- Listed height: 6 ft 3 in (1.91 m)
- Listed weight: 190 lb (86 kg)

Career information
- High school: Charlevoix (Charlevoix, Michigan)
- College: Alma (1939–1942)
- Playing career: 1944–1948
- Position: Guard

Career history

Playing
- 1944–1947: Midland Dows
- 1947–1948: Flint Dow A.C.'s

Coaching
- 19??–19??: Midland HS

Keith Emrey Carey (March 5, 1920 – February 15, 1999) was an American professional basketball player. He played for the Flint Dow A.C.'s in the National Basketball League during the 1947–48 season and averaged 3.0 points per game.

In college, Carey lettered in football, basketball, tennis, and track for Alma College.
