= Bill DeVenzio =

American basketball and baseball player

Personal information
- Born: August 2, 1924 Coraopolis, Pennsylvania
- Died: January 1, 1969 (aged 44) Moon Township, Pennsylvania
- Listed height: 6 ft 0 in (1.83 m)
- Listed weight: 185 lb (84 kg)

Career information
- High school: Coraopolis (Coraopolis, Pennsylvania)
- College: Geneva (1942–1945); Eastern Kentucky (1946–1947)
- NBA draft: 1947: undrafted
- Position: Guard

Career history
- 1947: Syracuse Nationals
- 1947–1948: Altoona

William Lawrence DeVenzio (August 2, 1924 – January 1, 1969) was an American professional basketball player. He played in the National Basketball League in six games for the Syracuse Nationals during the 1947–48 season and averaged 1.8 points per game.

DeVenzio also played one year of minor league baseball, for the Hannibal Pilots during the 1947 season. In college he had transferred from Geneva College, where he lettered for three years in basketball, to Eastern Kentucky University because Geneva did not have a baseball team at the time. While at Eastern Kentucky he played basketball for one season and baseball for two.
