= Abel Rodrigues =

American basketball player

Abel Rodriguez
Personal information
- Born: January 16, 1922 San Jose, California, U.S.
- Died: July 17, 2010 (aged 88) Saratoga, California, U.S.
- Listed height: 6 ft 2 in (1.88 m)
- Listed weight: 182 lb (83 kg)

Career information
- High school: San Jose (San Jose, California)
- College: Hartnell (1941–1942)
- Position: Guard

Career history
- 1947: Oshkosh All-Stars
- 1947–1948: St. Paul Saints
- 1948: Portland Indians
- Stats at Basketball Reference

Abel Joseph Rodrigues Jr. (January 16, 1922 – July 17, 2010) was an American professional basketball player. He played for the Oshkosh All-Stars in the National Basketball League for eight games during the 1947–48 season and averaged 1.1 points per game.
