= Jimmy Joyce (basketball) =

American basketball player

Personal information
- Born: October 23, 1924 Philadelphia, Pennsylvania
- Died: October 24, 2006 (aged 82) Wilmington, Delaware
- Listed height: 6 ft 5 in (1.96 m)
- Listed weight: 195 lb (88 kg)

Career information
- High school: Darby (Darby Township, Pennsylvania)
- College: Temple (1944–1947)
- NBA draft: 1947: undrafted
- Playing career: 1947–1951
- Position: Forward

Career history
- 1947: Tri-Cities Blackhawks
- 1947–1949: Utica Olympics
- 1948–1949: Reading
- 1949–1951: Lancaster Roses

James Aloysius Joyce (October 23, 1924 – October 24, 2006) was an American professional basketball player. He played in the National Basketball League for the Tri-Cities Blackhawks in one game during the 1947–48 season. He also competed in the New York State Professional Basketball League and the Eastern Basketball League. In Joyce's post-playing career, he first taught physical education in Ferris, Delaware before working in the Traffic Department in Hercules, Delaware.
