= Hal Gensichen =

American basketball player (1921–1990)

Personal information
- Born: January 2, 1921
- Died: April 27, 1990 (aged 69)

Career information
- High school: South Bend Central (South Bend, Indiana)
- College: Western Michigan (1941–1943, 1946–1947)
- Position: Guard

Career history
- 1947–1948: Indianapolis Kautskys
- 1948: Flint Dow A.C.'s

Career highlights
- Third-team All-American – Converse (1943)

Harold F. Gensichen (January 2, 1921 – April 27, 1990) was an American basketball professional player in the National Basketball League (NBL).

Gensichen starred at South Bend Central High School in South Bend, Indiana, playing for future Hall of Fame coach John Wooden. He played college basketball at Western Michigan University from 1941 to 1943, earning third-team All-American honors from Converse in 1943. Gensichen then spent three years serving in the United States Navy during World War II before returning to WMU for his final season of eligibility in 1946.

Following his college career, Gensichen returned to his home state to play with the Indianapolis Kautskys of the American NBL (a league that would eventually merge with the Basketball Association of America to form the National Basketball Association) for the 1947–48 season. He averaged 6.1 points in 32 games for the Kautskys before being traded to the Flint Dow A.C.'s for the last four games of the season. Following the season, Gensichen's contract was purchased by the Anderson Packers of the NBA, but he never played for the franchise.
