= 1947–48 Flint/Midland Dow A.C.'s season =

- Head coach: Jimmy Walsh (0–2); Matt Zunic (interim player-coach; 8–50)
- Owner: Dow Chemical Company
- Arena: Flint Industrial Mutual Association Auditorium (Flint); Midland High School Gymnasium (Midland)

Results
- Record: 8–52 (.133)
- Place: Division: 6th (Eastern)
- Playoff finish: Did not qualify

The 1947–48 Flint/Midland Dow A.C.'s season was the first and only year the Dow A.C.'s franchise played in the United States' National Basketball League (NBL), which was also the eleventh year the league existed. However, if you include their previous seasons of independent play alongside seasons as an Amateur Athletic Union squad that was also later considered to be a works team for the Dow Chemical Company (alongside the few seasons they appeared in the World Professional Basketball Tournament, with their previous season also being meant to be a season where they were supposed to join the NBL at the time, but didn't make it in time for the NBL to allow the squad in) as the Midland Dow Chemicals (alongside apparent alternative names in the Midland Dows and the Midland Dow A.C.'s on its own accord), this would actually be their sixth and final season of play as a franchise before later folding operations altogether. For some unknown reason, the Midland Dow Chemicals would move from Midland, Michigan to Flint, Michigan for their only season in the NBL at first, rebranding themselves as the Flint Dow A.C.'s at the time before at some unknown point in their season, the Dow A.C.'s would move back to Midland to play as the Midland Dow A.C.'s instead, though most of the home games they played this season would still be in Flint instead of in Midland. Regardless of the odd historic situation at hand for this squad, the Dow A.C.'s would still end up having one of the worst seasons in NBL history despite them having Bob Calihan (who became a member of the All-NBL Second Team this season and was picked up by the Dow A.C.'s in the dispersal draft of Chicago American Gears players alongside Stan Patrick) on their roster for close to the entire season, with their full 60-game season resulting in an 8–52 record that would only be barely above the record held by the Detroit Gems from the previous season when they went 4–40 in a 44-game season and the inaugural NBL season's Columbus Athletic Supply team that went 1–12 in a season that was meant to go 20 games long, yet went all over the place for length for the worst NBL seasons ever produced in the league's 12-year history (or 14-year history if you include the league's first two seasons using the Midwest Basketball Conference precursor name). Eleven teams competed in the NBL in the 1947–48 season, which was composed of six teams in the Eastern Division (including the Dow A.C.'s franchise) and five teams in the Western Division after the previous NBL champions of the season, the Chicago American Gears, ended up defecting from the NBL in order to create a very ambitious, yet short-lived rivaling basketball league of their own called the Professional Basketball League of America.

The Dow A.C.'s had originally started out with a promising-looking start into their preseason period, but once they entered the regular season, they began with losing their first eight out of nine games played (with them only winning against the Oshkosh All-Stars on November 22, 1947 on the road), with the losses continuing to pile up onto their season as the season continued onward for them. After two games into the season, their original head coach, Jimmy Walsh, was fired from his position and replaced by Matt Zunic as a player-coach for what was originally intended to be an interim basis before ultimately being their head coach for the entire season afterward, despite only having eight wins as a player-coach there. At some point in the season (when specifically it was is currently unknown), the Dow A.C.'s were starting to run out of money to afford playing in their original location they first played in for their season out in Flint and moved their operations to the other location they were in (going back to Midland akin to their early history as the Midland Dow Chemicals) for the rest of their season going forward, though they would still continue playing some of their home games out in Flint instead of in Midland. By the time their regular season ended, the Dow Chemical Company decided to disband the Dow A.C.'s works team as a professional franchise altogether, thus leading to the official end of the team entirely after their only season in the NBL. Their departure alongside the Toledo Jeeps' departure as a folding squad after the conclusion of the season when they (alongside the Oshkosh All-Stars) failed to join the new NBL champion Minneapolis Lakers, the Rochester Royals, the Fort Wayne Zollner Pistons, and Indianapolis Kautskys into defecting into the rivaling Basketball Association of America would leave the NBL with only five teams remaining from this season (the Anderson Duffey Packers (the only remaining team that could be considered a works team for the NBL in relation to its starting point as a league), the Oshkosh All-Stars, the Sheboygan Red Skins, the Syracuse Nationals, and the Tri-Cities Blackhawks) entering what would later become their final season of existence as a professional basketball league.

== Draft picks ==
The Flint Dow A.C.'s would participate in the 1947 NBL draft, which occurred right after the 1947 BAA draft due to a joint agreement the National Basketball League and the rivaling Basketball Association of America had with each other during the offseason period. However, as of 2026, no records of what the draft picks for the Dow A.C.'s franchise might have been for the NBL have properly come up (assuming Flint would even be ready for entry by the time the 1947 NBL draft began), with any information on who those selections might have been (especially since the Flint Dow A.C.'s franchise would be considered an expansion franchise for the NBL this season) being lost to time in the process.

== Roster ==
Player	Position
Wally Borrevik	C
Bob Calihan	G-F
Keith Carey	G
Frank Carswell	G
Dick Furey	G-F
Hal Gensichen	G
Jim Gibbs	F-C
John Gibbs	G
Paul Herman	G
John Janisch	G-F
Charlie Joachim	G-F
Hal Korovin	C
Stan Patrick	G-F
Ray Patterson	F
Fred Rehm	G
Bill Sattler	C
Milt Schoon	C
Danny Smick	F-C
Milt Ticco	G-F
Danny Wagner	G
Matt Zunic	G-F

It's ultimately unknown as of 2026 as to which players played for the Dow A.C.'s when they were just in Flint for representation, which players played for the Dow A.C.'s just in Midland for representation, and which Dow A.C.'s players played for them in both Flint and Midland out in the state of Michigan for the team's representation, though it's known that many (though not all) of the players that were on the team played for the team in both Flint and Midland due to the number of games the Dow A.C.'s played this season. It's also suggested that the Dow A.C.'s were actually just the Flint Dow A.C.'s for that entire season, but their home venue representation was ultimately split between that of Flint and Midland due to their shaky season they had, which included home venue problems.

== Regular season ==
=== Season standings ===
Pos.	Eastern Division	Wins	Losses	Win %
1	Rochester Royals	44	16	.733
2	Anderson Duffey Packers	42	18	.700
3	Fort Wayne Zollner Pistons	40	20	.667
4	Syracuse Nationals	24	36	.400
5	Toledo Jeeps	22	37	.373
6	Flint/Midland Dow A.C.'s^{‡}	8	52	.133
^{‡} Flint relocated to Midland during the season and assumed Flint's record in the standings. It's unknown what the records for Flint's tenure and Midland's tenure were.

=== NBL Schedule ===
Not to be confused with exhibition or other non-NBL scheduled games that did not count towards the official NBL record for the Dow A.C.'s franchise for this season of play. An official database created by John Grasso detailing every NBL match possible (outside of two matches that the Kankakee Gallagher Trojans won over the Dayton Metropolitans in 1938) would be released in 2026 showcasing every team's official schedules throughout their time spent in the NBL. As such, these are the official results recorded for the Flint/Midland Dow A.C.'s during their only season in the NBL, regardless of whether they played their games in Flint, Midland, or somewhere else entirely.

- November 6, 1947 @ Anderson, IN: Flint Dow A.C.'s 63, Anderson Duffey Packers 73
- November 7, 1947 @ Toledo, OH: Flint Dow A.C.'s 56, Toledo Jeeps 75
- November 13, 1947 @ Sheboygan, WI: Flint Dow A.C.'s 59, Sheboygan Red Skins 65
- November 16, 1947 @ Fort Wayne, IN: Flint Dow A.C.'s 54, Fort Wayne Zollner Pistons 64
- November 18, 1947 @ Syracuse, NY: Flint Dow A.C.'s 51, Syracuse Nationals 66
- November 20, 1947 @ Rochester, NY: Flint Dow A.C.'s 50, Rochester Royals 65
- November 22, 1947 @ Oshkosh, WI: Flint Dow A.C.'s 53, Oshkosh All-Stars 66
- November 23, 1947 @ Flint, MI: Oshkosh All-Stars 66, Flint Dow A.C.'s 72
- November 25, 1947 @ Flint, MI: Rochester Royals 76, Flint Dow A.C.'s 54
- November 30, 1947 @ Moline, IL: Flint Dow A.C.'s 69, Tri-Cities Blackhawks 83
- December 1, 1947 @ Midland, MI: Minneapolis Lakers 68, Midland Dow A.C.'s 75
- December 2, 1947 @ Flint, MI: Sheboygan Red Skins 64, Flint Dow A.C.'s 59
- December 7, 1947 @ Flint, MI: Anderson Duffey Packers 68, Flint Dow A.C.'s 64
- December 9, 1947 @ Indianapolis, IN: Flint Dow A.C.'s 44, Indianapolis Kautskys 77
- December 13, 1947 @ Midland, MI: Syracuse Nationals 64, Midland Dow A.C.'s 55
- December 14, 1947 @ Flint, MI: Rochester Royals 78, Flint Dow A.C.'s 63
- December 15, 1947 @ Midland, MI: Sheboygan Red Skins 72, Midland Dow A.C.'s 62
- December 18, 1947 @ Flint, MI: Fort Wayne Zollner Pistons 71, Flint Dow A.C.'s 74
- December 21, 1947 @ Flint, MI: Toledo Jeeps 51, Flint Dow A.C.'s 48
- December 28, 1947 @ Flint, MI: Anderson Duffey Packers 74, Flint Dow A.C.'s 71
- December 30, 1947 @ Indianapolis, IN: Flint Dow A.C.'s 57, Indianapolis Kautskys 77
- January 1, 1948 @ Sheboygan, WI: Flint Dow A.C.'s 69, Sheboygan Red Skins 64
- January 3, 1948 @ Oshkosh, WI: Flint Dow A.C.'s 47, Oshkosh All-Stars 58
- January 4, 1948 @ Minneapolis, MN: Flint Dow A.C.'s 50, Minneapolis Lakers 75
- January 5, 1948 @ Minneapolis, MN: Flint Dow A.C.'s 42, Minneapolis Lakers 80
- January 7, 1948 @ Flint, MI: Tri-Cities Blackhawks 62, Flint Dow A.C.'s 53
- January 9, 1948 @ Saginaw, MI: Tri-Cities Blackhawks 60, Flint/Midland Dow A.C.'s 54
- January 10, 1948 @ Midland, MI: Minneapolis Lakers 66, Midland Dow A.C.'s 49
- January 11, 1948 @ Flint, MI: Oshkosh All-Stars 79, Flint Dow A.C.'s 52
- January 12, 1948 @ Midland, MI: Toledo Jeeps 51, Midland Dow A.C.'s 56
- January 14, 1948 @ Flint, MI: Indianapolis Kautskys 55, Flint Dow A.C.'s 59
- January 15, 1948 @ Anderson, IN: Flint Dow A.C.'s 54, Anderson Duffey Packers 82
- January 18, 1948 @ Chicago, IL (as part of the NBL-BAA doubleheader series held this season): Oshkosh All-Stars 55, Flint/Midland Dow A.C.'s 47
- January 19, 1948 @ Midland, MI: Rochester Royals 85, Midland Dow A.C.'s 72
- January 20, 1948 @ Toledo, OH: Flint Dow A.C.'s 51, Toledo Jeeps 64
- January 22, 1948 @ Fort Wayne, IN: Flint Dow A.C.'s 59, Fort Wayne Zollner Pistons 67
- January 27, 1948 @ Chicago, IL (as part of the NBL-BAA doubleheader series held this season): Flint Dow A.C.'s 50, Tri-Cities Blackhawks 62
- January 28, 1948 @ Indianapolis, IN: Flint Dow A.C.'s 67, Indianapolis Kautskys 76
- January 31, 1948 @ Rochester, NY: Flint Dow A.C.'s 72, Rochester Royals 89
- February 2, 1948: Syracuse Nationals 67, Flint Dow A.C.'s 65 (OT @ Flint, MI)
- February 5, 1948 @ Huntington, IN: Flint Dow A.C.'s 57, Fort Wayne Zollner Pistons 74
- February 8, 1948 @ Flint, MI: Anderson Duffey Packers 62, Flint Dow A.C.'s 52
- February 9, 1948 @ Midland, MI: Tri-Cities Blackhawks 67, Midland Dow A.C.'s 63
- February 12, 1948 @ Toledo, OH: Flint Dow A.C.'s 56, Toledo Jeeps 79
- February 16, 1948 @ Midland, MI: Oshkosh All-Stars 61, Midland Dow A.C.'s 63
- February 18, 1948: Fort Wayne Zollner Pistons 59, Flint Dow A.C.'s 57 (OT @ Flint, MI)
- February 19, 1948 @ Flint, MI: Rochester Royals 56, Flint Dow A.C.'s 51
- February 21, 1948 @ Rochester, NY: Flint Dow A.C.'s 57, Rochester Royals 68
- February 27, 1948 @ Flint, MI: Toledo Jeeps 65, Flint Dow A.C.'s 76
- February 29, 1948 @ Flint, MI: Indianapolis Kautskys 87, Flint Dow A.C.'s 57
- March 1, 1948: Sheboygan Red Skins 70, Midland Dow A.C.'s 67 (OT @ Midland, MI)
- March 4, 1948 @ Sheboygan, WI: Flint Dow A.C.'s 58, Sheboygan Red Skins 63
- March 7, 1948 @ Moline, IL: Flint Dow A.C.'s 75, Tri-Cities Blackhawks 85
- March 8, 1948 @ Flint, MI: Fort Wayne Zollner Pistons 55, Flint Dow A.C.'s 51
- March 10, 1948 @ Flint, MI: Syracuse Nationals 71, Flint Dow A.C.'s 59
- March 11, 1948 @ Flint, MI: Anderson Duffey Packers 71, Flint Dow A.C.'s 51
- March 13, 1948 @ Syracuse, NY: Flint Dow A.C.'s 71, Syracuse Nationals 90
- March 14, 1948 @ Minneapolis, MN: Flint Dow A.C.'s 54, Minneapolis Lakers 80
- March 18, 1948 @ Chicago, IL (as the series finale for the NBL-BAA doubleheader series held this season): Flint Dow A.C.'s 45, Indianapolis Kautskys 79
- March 20, 1948 @ Syracuse, NY: Flint Dow A.C.'s 60, Syracuse Nationals 66

== Awards and honors ==
- Bob Calihan – All-NBL Second Team
