= Toledo Jeeps =

Defunct basketball team in the United States

- Leagues: NBL: 1946–1948
- Founded: 1946
- History: 1946-48
- Arena: University of Toledo Field House
- Location: Toledo, Ohio
- Head coach: Jule Rivlin
- Championships: none

The Toledo Jeeps were a professional basketball team that played in the National Basketball League from 1946 to 1948. As with many other NBL teams, they owed their name to an industry of their hometown, in this case the Willys-Overland Jeep Plant. They played their games at the University of Toledo Field House. According to historian Murry R. Nelson in the book called The National Basketball League: A History, 1935–1949, the Toledo Jeeps were actually a returning member in the Toledo Jim White Chevrolets (who played in the NBL from 1941–1943 before leaving due to the struggles of World War II) due to them having the same management, but now being sponsored by Jeep instead of Chevrolet under Jim White's name. Toledo's inclusion in 1946 came at the behest of them taking on the spot that was previously held by the Pittsburgh Raiders when the NBL initially wanted them to come back for the 1946–47 season, to the point where Toledo's new franchise owners would essentially buy out the NBL spot from the Raiders franchise (who by this point in time returned to being an independent franchise, though they would later play for the AAL until 1950).

The Jeeps' first season in the league (at least under the Toledo Jeeps name) was also the NBL's first official season where they actually implemented a drafting system similar to what the future rivaling Basketball Association of America (and later merging partner to become the National Basketball Association) had for the eventual NBA draft system a year later following the conclusion of their inaugural league season for the purpose of controlled player salaries and limiting the idea of outbidding other players outside of their own 12-player teams at hand (with the NBL having a budget of $6,000 this season), as well as implementing key players to signing binding contracts as soon as they could and the NBL looking to have full-time referees on display. The 1946–47 team featured players such as Chips Sobek, Hal Tidrick, Jule Rivlin and rookie Paul Seymour. Rivlin served as the player-coach. They went 21–23 and qualified for the playoffs, where they lost to the Fort Wayne Zollner Pistons. They would, however, be invited to the 1947 World Professional Basketball Tournament, where they finished 2nd behind the Indianapolis Kautskys.

In the 1947–48 NBL season, Sobek, Tidrick and Rivlin returned, and were joined by Dick Mehen and Harry Boykoff. The team finished with a record of 22–37 and missed the playoffs. That season was also notable for Jackie Goldsmith's brief involvement with the team; Goldsmith would later be better known for his involvement in the 1951 college basketball point-shaving scandal that involved a total of 34 (later 35) past or present college basketball players from that time in seven (later eight) colleges to fix matches by point-shaving for betting purposes (like in Goldsmith's case as a since-retired player) that almost completely ruined the sport of basketball's reputation entirely at the time. On May 10, 1948, the Jeeps joined the Fort Wayne Zollner Pistons, Indianapolis Kautskys, Minneapolis Lakers, Rochester Royals, and Oshkosh All-Stars as one of six NBL teams to at least try and switch from the NBL to the Basketball Association of America (BAA), though like the All-Stars, the Jeeps failed to switch leagues that year and joined the aborted BAA Buffalo team and cities of Louisville, Kentucky and Wilkes-Barre, Pennsylvania as failed teams and locations to have teams enter the BAA that year. The 1947-48 NBL season later proved to be the Jeeps' last; they were replaced for what became the NBL's final season with the Hammond Calumet Buccaneers. Meanwhile, another new NBL team added for that same season, the Waterloo Hawks, ended up inheriting Mehen and Boykoff from Toledo.
