= Porziņģis =

Family name

Porziņģis is a Latvian surname. Notable people with the surname include:

- Jānis Porziņģis (born 1982), Latvian professional basketball player
- Kristaps Porziņģis (born 1995), Latvian professional basketball player
