= 1947–48 Baltimore Bullets season =

- BAA champions
- Head coach: Buddy Jeannette
- Owner: Robert "Jake" Embry
- Arena: Baltimore Coliseum

Results
- Record: 28–20 (.583)
- Place: Division: 2nd (Western)
- Playoff finish: BAA Champions
- Stats at Basketball Reference

Local media
- Television: WMAR-TV
- Radio: WITH

The 1947–48 Baltimore Bullets season was the Bullets' first season in the Basketball Association of America which would later be named the NBA. They played their first three seasons in the American Basketball League in its last few seasons as a professional basketball league that rivaled the BAA and the National Basketball League, making this their fourth professional basketball season in franchise history. This season marked their second overall championship after previously winning the 1946 ABL Championship over the Philadelphia Sphas, who were also coached by Eddie Gottlieb at the time, funnily enough. (The Bullets also claimed a third championship in 1947 due to their overwhelming regular season record in the ABL that year. In the postseason, the Bullets felt that the ABL was unnecessarily delaying the start of their championship series, and they elected to play in the 1947 World Professional Basketball Tournament instead. The ABL therefore ruled that the Bullets forfeited the 1947 ABL Championship to the Trenton Tigers, establishing the discrepancy between the Bullets' claimed championships and the ABL's ruling.) In the 1947–48 season, the Bullets won their only BAA/NBA championship with a 4–2 series win over the defending champion Philadelphia Warriors. There were also additional talks between the younger BAA and the older NBL where the champions of the BAA (which became the Baltimore Bullets this season) and the champions of the NBL (which became the newly rebranded Minneapolis Lakers, who had an immediate shift from their early Detroit Gems days due primarily in part to George Mikan's addition to the team) competing to see who would be the ultimate champions between the two leagues (akin to a basketball version of the World Series, similar to the "World Series of Basketball" events that were held between multiple leagues from the late 1900s to the early 1920s), but that ultimately would never happen, especially once the Lakers joined the Rochester Royals, Fort Wayne Zollner Pistons (soon turned Fort Wayne Pistons), and Indianapolis Kautskys (soon turned Indianapolis Jets) as one of four NBL teams to move to the BAA by the end of the season. With their departure from the NBA during the 1954–55 season, the Baltimore Bullets are currently considered the only defunct NBA team to ever win a championship under the BAA/NBA name. The 1947-48 Bullets would go on to join the Chicago Stags from the 1946–47 season and the Washington Capitols from the 1948–49 season as the only BAA/NBA teams to close operations after competing in a BAA/NBA Finals championship series.

== Draft picks ==
Despite the Baltimore Bullets not originally playing in the Basketball Association of America during its inaugural season, the Bullets were allowed to participate in the inaugural BAA draft (now known as the NBA draft following the eventual merger of the Basketball Association of America and National Basketball League to become the modern-day National Basketball Association) after two of their inaugural teams in the Cleveland Rebels and Detroit Falcons dropped out of the BAA (following a vote by the then-current team owners at the time on what their plans were going to be entering the following season) due to Baltimore having a major dispute with the original American Basketball League during their playoff period and subsequently wanting to join the newly created BAA in the process. As a result of that, the Bullets held the last selections of each round due to them having the best record of every team involved in the BAA at this time despite them playing their previous season in the original ABL (losing only three regular season games in the ABL (losing to the Philadelphia Sphas 68–63 on November 30, 1946, the Trenton Tigers 64–53 on December 12, 1946, and the Philadelphia Sphas again on February 1, 1947, this time in a 77–59 beatdown) despite playing less games there with 34 total regular season matches there, while the best BAA team last season, the Washington Capitols, had a 49–11 record), though official records of this draft outside of the first round in terms of ordering are currently unknown at this time.

Round	Pick	Player	Position(s)	Nationality	College
1	10	Larry Killick	PG	United States	Vermont
2	20	Bob Jake	–	United States	Vermont
3	30	John Rusinko	G	United States	Penn State
4	40	Harry Gallatin	PF/C	United States	Northeast Missouri State Teachers College
5	49	Charles Raynor	–	United States	Houston
6	57	Scotty Hamilton	PG	United States	West Virginia
7	64	Hugh Hampton	–	United States	High Point College
8	70	Elmer Gainer	PF/C	United States	DePaul
9	75	Chick Reiser	SG/SF	United States	New York University
10	78	Robert Bolyard	SG/SF	United States	Toledo

Interestingly, a good number of the team's draft picks for the inaugural BAA/NBA draft period would involve players that had already played professionally for other professional basketball leagues, such as Scotty Hamilton from the Wilmington Bombers of the same American Basketball League that the Baltimore Bullets used to play in, both Elmer Gainer and Bob Bolyard of the Anderson Duffey Packers from the rivaling National Basketball League, and Chick Reiser of the Fort Wayne Zollner Pistons (later becoming the present-day Detroit Pistons) from the rivaling National Basketball League.

== Roster ==
1947–48 Baltimore Bullets roster
Players

Pos.	No.	Player	Height	Weight	DOB	From
G	23	Herm Fuetsch	6 ft 0 in (1.83 m)	170 lb (77 kg)	1918-07-06	Polytechnic HS (CA)
F/C	29	Kleggie Hermsen	6 ft 9 in (2.06 m)	225 lb (102 kg)	1923-03-12	Minnesota
G/F	32	Paul Hoffman	6 ft 2 in (1.88 m)	195 lb (88 kg)	1925-04-12	Purdue
G	26	Buddy Jeannette	5 ft 11 in (1.80 m)	175 lb (79 kg)	1917-09-15	Washington & Jefferson
G	20	Red Klotz	5 ft 7 in (1.70 m)	150 lb (68 kg)	1921-10-21	Villanova
F/C	35	Grady Lewis	6 ft 7 in (2.01 m)	215 lb (98 kg)	1917-03-25	Oklahoma
G/F	31	Carl Meinhold	6 ft 2 in (1.88 m)	185 lb (84 kg)	1926-03-29	Long Island
G/F	27	Chick Reiser	5 ft 11 in (1.80 m)	165 lb (75 kg)	1914-12-17	NYU
G/F	21	Dick Schulz	6 ft 2 in (1.88 m)	192 lb (87 kg)	1917-01-03	Wisconsin
F/C	33	Connie Simmons	6 ft 8 in (2.03 m)	222 lb (101 kg)	1925-03-15	Flushing HS (NY)

Coaches
Head coach

Buddy Jeannette

Legend
- (DP) Unsigned draft pick
- (FA) Free agent
- (S) Suspended
- Injured

Roster

== Regular season ==
=== Season standings ===
#	Western Division				
#	Team	W	L	PCT	GB
1	x-St. Louis Bombers	29	19	.604	–
2	x-Baltimore Bullets	28	20	.583	1
3	x-Chicago Stags	28	20	.583	1
4	x-Washington Capitols	28	20	.583	1

=== Game log ===
#	Date	Opponent	Score	High points	Record
1	November 12	@ Washington	L 55–63	Kleggie Hermsen (18)	0–1
2	November 13	Boston	W 85–74	Chick Reiser (19)	1–1
3	November 15	@ Chicago	W 67–63	Paul Hoffman (14)	2–1
4	November 20	New York	W 68–56	Chick Reiser (19)	3–1
5	November 21	@ Boston	W 89–73	Buddy Jeannette (17)	4–1
6	November 22	Chicago	W 75–72	Chick Reiser (19)	5–1
7	November 27	Providence	W 76–61	Jeannette, Meinhold (13)	6–1
8	November 29	@ St. Louis	W 71–67	Kleggie Hermsen (21)	7–1
9	December 2	@ Boston	W 77–69 (OT)	Chick Reiser (22)	8–1
10	December 3	@ Philadelphia	W 73–58	Buddy Jeannette (15)	9–1
11	December 4	St. Louis	L 51–65	Mike Bloom (12)	9–2
12	December 6	@ Chicago	L 65–73	Buddy Jeannette (17)	9–3
13	December 11	Washington	L 69–71 (OT)	Mike Bloom (18)	9–4
14	December 13	New York	L 66–80	Kleggie Hermsen (17)	9–5
15	December 17	@ Washington	L 64–66	Jeannette, Schulz (16)	9–6
16	December 18	St. Louis	W 74–67	Chick Reiser (16)	10–6
17	December 21	@ Chicago	L 83–93	Kleggie Hermsen (23)	10–7
18	December 25	Chicago	W 87–70	Kleggie Hermsen (21)	11–7
19	December 28	@ St. Louis	L 63–67	Dick Schulz (16)	11–8
20	January 1	Philadelphia	L 60–72	Chick Reiser (13)	11–9
21	January 3	@ New York	W 79–70	Kleggie Hermsen (18)	12–9
22	January 6	@ Providence	W 82–64	Chick Reiser (17)	13–9
23	January 8	Chicago	W 78–75	Hoffman, Jeannette (15)	14–9
24	January 11	@ St. Louis	L 54–69	Paul Hoffman (12)	14–10
25	January 15	Providence	W 98–78	Bloom, Hoffman (19)	15–10
26	January 16	@ Philadelphia	L 63–72	Chick Reiser (16)	15–11
27	January 17	Philadelphia	L 77–79	Mike Bloom (18)	15–12
28	January 22	St. Louis	L 68–71	Mike Bloom (14)	15–13
29	January 24	@ New York	W 72–58	Chick Reiser (16)	16–13
30	January 27	@ Chicago	L 74–78	Chick Reiser (20)	16–14
31	January 30	Washington^{a}	W 95–71	Chick Reiser (18)	17–14
32	January 31	@ Providence	W 68–62	Kleggie Hermsen (22)	18–14
33	February 4	@ Washington	L 72–77	Paul Hoffman (18)	18–15
34	February 5	Providence	W 100–74	Hoffman, Jeannette (19)	19–15
35	February 12	New York	W 96–86	Kleggie Hermsen (24)	20–15
36	February 15	@ St. Louis	L 63–69	Paul Hoffman (17)	20–16
37	February 19	Boston	W 79–76 (OT)	Paul Hoffman (17)	21–16
38	February 21	@ Washington	W 72–85	Kleggie Hermsen (14)	21–17
39	February 24	@ Philadelphia	L 71–83	Paul Hoffman (16)	21–18
40	February 26	Washington	W 97–70	Connie Simmons (17)	22–18
41	February 28	@ New York	W 78–56	Connie Simmons (14)	23–18
42	February 29	@ Boston	L 62–65	Grady Lewis (12)	23–19
43	March 4	St. Louis	W 84–75	Carl Meinhold (16)	24–19
44	March 6	Boston	W 81–68	Connie Simmons (23)	25–19
45	March 11	Chicago	W 86–83	Carl Meinhold (16)	26–19
46	March 13	Philadelphia	W 64–62	Chick Reiser (18)	27–19
47	March 18	Washington	L 64–71	Hermsen, Hoffman (15)	27–20
48	March 20	@ Providence	W 75–58	Buddy Jeannette (19)	28–20

a: Game Played at Fifth Regiment Armory

== BAA Playoffs ==
=== BAA Western Division Tiebreaker ===
Chicago Stags vs. Baltimore Bullets: Bullets win series 1-0

- Game 1 @ Chicago (Thursday, March 25): Baltimore 75, Chicago 72

=== BAA First Round ===
(W2) Baltimore Bullets vs. (E2) New York Knicks: Bullets win series 2-1

- Game 1 @ Baltimore (Saturday, March 27): Baltimore 85, New York 81
- Game 2 @ New York (Easter Sunday, March 28): New York 79, Baltimore 69
- Game 3 @ Baltimore (Thursday, April 1): Baltimore 84, New York 77

=== BAA Semifinals ===
(W2) Baltimore Bullets vs. (W3) Chicago Stags: Bullets win series 2-0

- Game 1 @ Chicago (Wednesday, April 7): Baltimore 73, Chicago 67
- Game 2 @ Baltimore (Thursday, April 8): Baltimore 89, Chicago 72

=== BAA Finals ===
(E1) Philadelphia Warriors vs. (W2) Baltimore Bullets: Bullets win series 4-2

- Game 1 @ Philadelphia (Saturday, April 10): Philadelphia 71, Baltimore 60
- Game 2 @ Philadelphia (Tuesday, April 13): Baltimore 66, Philadelphia 63
- Game 3 @ Baltimore (Thursday, April 15): Baltimore 72, Philadelphia 70
- Game 4 @ Baltimore (Saturday, April 17): Baltimore 78, Philadelphia 75
- Game 5 @ Philadelphia (Tuesday, April 20): Philadelphia 91, Baltimore 82
- Game 6 @ Baltimore (Wednesday, April 21): Baltimore 88, Philadelphia 73

== Transactions ==
=== Trades ===
January 20, 1948	To Baltimore Bullets Grady Lewis	To St. Louis Bombers Irv Rothenberg
February 9, 1948	To Baltimore Bullets Connie Simmons	To Boston Celtics Mike Bloom

=== Purchases ===
Player	Date purchased	Former team
Jerry Rullo	October 14, 1947	Philadelphia Warriors
