= List of shortest players in NBA history =

This is a complete listing of players in the history of the National Basketball Association with listed heights of 5-foot-9-inch (1.75 m) or shorter. Only 27 NBA players have been at or below this height. The shortest NBA player to be inducted into the Naismith Memorial Basketball Hall of Fame is Calvin Murphy at 5-foot-9-inch (1.75 m). All of the players listed here have played the position of point guard. The most seasons played in the National Basketball Association (NBA) by a player listed at 5-foot-6-inch (1.68 m) or shorter was 14 seasons by Muggsy Bogues who played from 1987 to 2001. At 5-foot-11-inch (1.80 m), Jordan McLaughlin of the San Antonio Spurs, Ryan Nembhard of the Denver Nuggets, and Braden Smith of the Indiana Pacers are currently the shortest active NBA players and the only active NBA player listed under 6-foot-0-inch (1.83 m).

The shortest player ever in the defunct American Basketball Association (1967–76) was Penny Ann Early, a 5-foot-3-inch (1.60 m) jockey who took part in one play in one game for the Kentucky Colonels as a publicity stunt in 1969. The shortest signed ABA players were Jerry Dover and Monte Towe, both 5-foot-7-inch (1.70 m).

== Table ==
Statistics accurate as of the 2025–26 NBA season.

^	Active NBA player		
*	Inducted into the Naismith Memorial Basketball Hall of Fame		
†	Not yet eligible for Hall of Fame consideration (Note: A player is not eligible for induction into the Naismith Memorial Basketball Hall of Fame until he has been fully retired for two calendar years.)		
GP	Games played	FG%	Field goal percentage

Height	Weight	Player	Nationality	Teams	GP	Points		Rebounds (Note: The National Basketball Association did not record rebound statistics until 1950–51 NBA season.)		Assists		FG%	Notes
Height	Weight	Player	Nationality	Teams	GP	Total	Per game	Total	Per game	Total	Per game	FG%	Notes
5 ft 3 in (1.60 m)	136 lb (62 kg)	Muggsy Bogues	USA	Washington Bullets (1987–1988); Charlotte Hornets (1988–1997); Golden State Warriors (1997–1999); Toronto Raptors (1999–2001)	889	6,858	7.7	2,318	2.6	6,726	7.6	.458	Played alongside one of the two tallest players in NBA history, Manute Bol, during the 1987–88 NBA season for the Washington Bullets; their difference in height was 28 inches (71 cm). Appeared in the 1995 film Space Jam.
5 ft 5 in (1.65 m)	135 lb (61 kg)	Earl Boykins	USA	New Jersey Nets (1999); Cleveland Cavaliers (1999, 2000); Orlando Magic (1999); Los Angeles Clippers (2001–2002); Golden State Warriors (2002–2003); Denver Nuggets (2003–2007); Milwaukee Bucks (2007, 2011); Charlotte Bobcats (2008); Washington Wizards (2009–2010); Houston Rockets (2012)	652	5,791	8.9	877	1.3	2,092	3.2	.417	
5 ft 6 in (1.68 m)	165 lb (75 kg)	Mel Hirsch	USA	Boston Celtics (1946–1947)	13	19	1.5	—	—	10	0.8	.200	
5 ft 6 in (1.68 m)	133 lb (60 kg)	Spud Webb	USA	Atlanta Hawks (1985–1991, 1995–1996); Sacramento Kings (1991–1995); Minnesota Timberwolves (1996); Orlando Magic (1998)	814	8,072	9.9	1,742	2.1	4,342	5.3	.452	Won the NBA Slam Dunk Contest in 1986; shortest player to participate in the Slam Dunk Contest.
5 ft 7 in (1.70 m)	140 lb (64 kg)	Greg Grant	USA	Phoenix Suns (1989–1990); New York Knicks (1990–1991); Charlotte Hornets (1991–1992); Philadelphia 76ers (1991–1992, 1992–1993, 1995–1996); Washington Bullets (1995–1996); Denver Nuggets (1994–1995, 1995–1996)	274	767	2.8	248	0.9	751	2.7	.383	
5 ft 7 in (1.70 m)	160 lb (73 kg)	Keith Jennings	USA	Golden State Warriors (1992–1995)	164	1,090	6.6	248	1.5	614	3.7	.436	
5 ft 7 in (1.70 m)	159 lb (72 kg)	Yuki Kawamura	JPN	Memphis Grizzlies (2024–2025); Chicago Bulls (2026)	40	98	2.5	45	1.1	66	1.7	.341	
5 ft 7 in (1.70 m)	150 lb (68 kg)	Red Klotz	USA	Baltimore Bullets (1947–1948)	11	15	1.4	—	—	7	0.6	.226	Shortest player to ever win an NBA championship. Later served as longtime head coach of the Washington Generals.
5 ft 7 in (1.70 m)	150 lb (68 kg)	Wat Misaka	USA	New York Knicks (1947–1948)	3	7	2.3	—	—	0	0.0	.231	First Non-Caucasian player and first Asian American player in the NBA.
5 ft 7 in (1.70 m)	160 lb (73 kg)	Markquis Nowell	USA	Toronto Raptors (2023–2024)	1	2	2.0	2	2.0	2	2.0	.000	
5 ft 7 in (1.70 m)	150 lb (68 kg)	Monte Towe	USA	Denver Nuggets (1976–1977)	51	130	2.5	34	0.7	87	1.7	.406	The shortest player in the original ABA. ABA All-Star (1976)
5 ft 8 in (1.73 m)	165 lb (75 kg)	Charlie Criss	USA	Atlanta Hawks (1977–1981, 1983–1984, 1984–1985); San Diego Clippers (1981–1982); Milwaukee Bucks (1982–1984)	418	3,534	8.5	592	1.4	1,335	3.2	.432	
5 ft 8 in (1.73 m)	160 lb (73 kg)	Jacob Gilyard	USA	Memphis Grizzlies (2022–2024); Brooklyn Nets (2024)	42	176	4.2	50	1.2	144	3.4	.403	
5 ft 8 in (1.73 m)	160 lb (73 kg)	Dino Martin	USA	Providence Steamrollers (1946–1948)	92	834	9.1	—	—	73	0.8	.294	
5 ft 8 in (1.73 m)	170 lb (77 kg)	Willie Somerset	USA	Baltimore Bullets (1965–1966)	8	45	5.6	15	1.9	9	1.1	.419	ABA All-Star (1969)
5 ft 9 in (1.75 m)	160 lb (73 kg)	Howie Carl	USA	Chicago Packers (1961–1962)	31	170	5.5	39	1.3	57	1.8	.333	
5 ft 9 in (1.75 m)	176 lb (80 kg)	Kay Felder	USA	Cleveland Cavaliers (2016–2017); Chicago Bulls (2017); Detroit Pistons (2018)	58	223	3.8	59	1.0	78	1.3	.364	
5 ft 9 in (1.75 m)	158 lb (72 kg)	Charlie Hoefer	DEU	Toronto Huskies (1946–1947); Boston Celtics (1947–1948)	65	361	5.6	—	—	36	0.6	.250	
5 ft 9 in (1.75 m)	150 lb (68 kg)	Lionel Malamed	USA	Indianapolis Jets (1948); Rochester Royals (1948–1949)	44	258	5.9	—	—	61	1.4	.334	
5 ft 9 in (1.75 m)	170 lb (77 kg)	Ed Melvin	USA	Pittsburgh Ironmen (1946–1947)	57	281	4.9	—	—	37	0.6	.263	
5 ft 9 in (1.75 m)	165 lb (75 kg)	Calvin Murphy*	USA	San Diego/Houston Rockets (1970–1983)	1,002	17,949	17.9	2,103	2.1	4,402	4.4	.482	Shortest NBA player to be inducted to the Hall of Fame, as well as appear in at least one All-Star Game. (Note: The shortest player in the Naismith Memorial Basketball Hall of fame is pre-NBA player Barney Sedran, at 5 feet 4 inches (163 cm).)
5 ft 9 in (1.75 m)	145 lb (66 kg)	Angelo Musi	USA	Philadelphia Warriors (1946–1949)	161	1,359	8.4	—	—	117	0.7	.290	BAA champion (1947)
5 ft 9 in (1.75 m)	160 lb (73 kg)	Ralph O'Brien	USA	Indianapolis Olympians (1951–1952); Fort Wayne Pistons (1953); Baltimore Bullets (1953)	119	848	7.1	192	1.6	180	1.5	.360	
5 ft 9 in (1.75 m)	180 lb (82 kg)	Nate Robinson	USA	New York Knicks (2005–2010); Boston Celtics (2009–2011); Oklahoma City Thunder (2011); Golden State Warriors (2011–2012); Chicago Bulls (2012–2013); Denver Nuggets (2013–2015); Los Angeles Clippers (2015); New Orleans Pelicans (2015)	618	6,807	11.0	1,446	2.3	1,826	3.0	.423	One of only two players to win the NBA Slam Dunk Contest, three times, winning in 2006, 2009 and 2010.
5 ft 9 in (1.75 m)	155 lb (70 kg)	Gene Rock	USA	Chicago Stags (1947–1948)	11	10	0.9	—	—	0	0.0	.222	
5 ft 9 in (1.75 m)	165 lb (75 kg)	Yuta Tabuse	JPN	Phoenix Suns (2004–2005)	4	7	1.8	4	1.0	3	0.8	.167	The first Japanese-born player to play in the NBA.
5 ft 9 in (1.75 m)	185 lb (84 kg)	Isaiah Thomas^{§}	USA	Sacramento Kings (2011–2014); Phoenix Suns (2014–2015, 2024); Boston Celtics (2015–2017); Cleveland Cavaliers (2017–2018); Los Angeles Lakers (2018, 2021); Denver Nuggets (2018–2019); Washington Wizards (2019–2020); New Orleans Pelicans (2021); Dallas Mavericks (2021); Charlotte Hornets (2022)	550	9,715	17.7	1,321	2.4	2,638	4.8	.434	Shortest player to be included in an All-NBA Team. Shortest player to play in an NBA All-Star game (tied with Calvin Murphy). Shortest player to play in multiple All-Star games. Shortest player to record a triple-double in a game.

== See also ==
- List of shortest people
- List of tallest players in NBA history
- List of NBA regular season records
