= Carl Meinhold =

American basketball player (1926–2019)

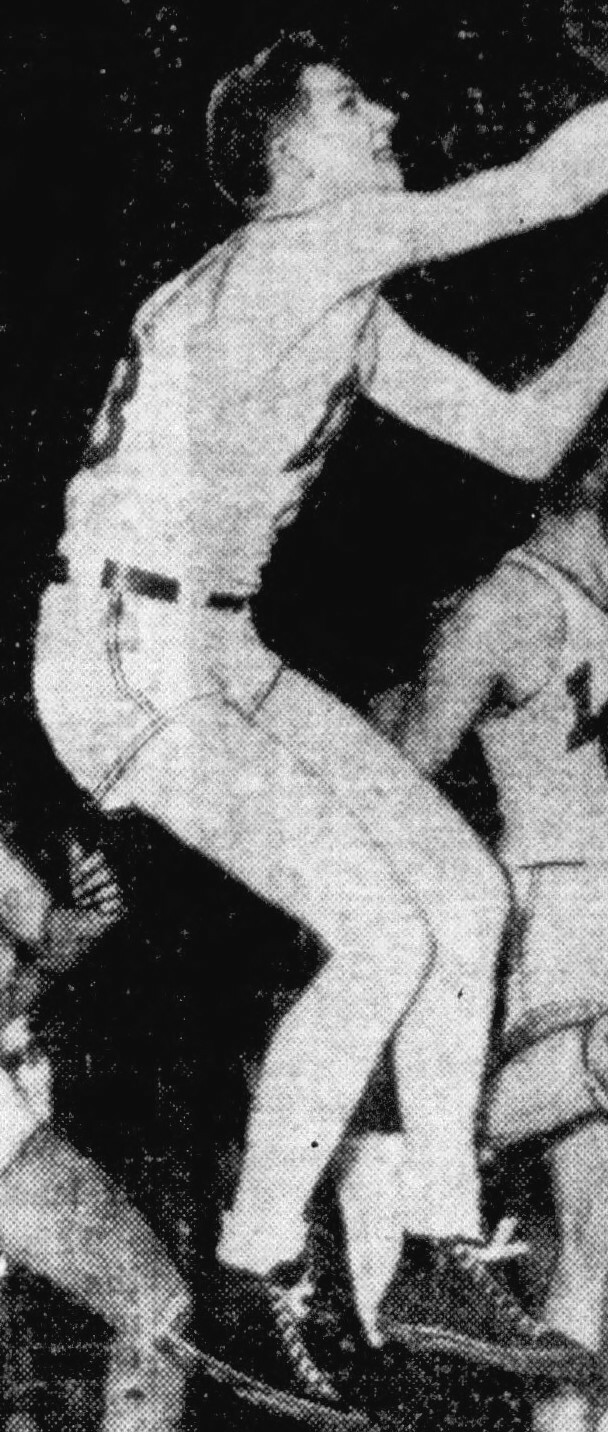
- Meinhold in 1945

Personal information
- Born: March 29, 1926 West Hazleton, Pennsylvania, U.S.
- Died: February 23, 2019 (aged 92)
- Listed height: 6 ft 2 in (1.88 m)
- Listed weight: 185 lb (84 kg)

Career information
- High school: Hazleton (Hazleton, Pennsylvania)
- College: LIU Brooklyn (1944–1946)
- Playing career: 1946–1956
- Position: Guard / forward
- Number: 31, 6, 11

Career history
- 1946–1947: Hazleton Mountaineers
- 1947–1948: Baltimore Bullets
- 1948–1949: Providence Steamrollers
- 1949: Chicago Stags
- 1949–1950, 1951–1952: Scranton Miners
- 1953–1954: Berwick Carbuilders

Career highlights
- BAA champion (1948); All-EPBL First Team (1954)
- Stats at NBA.com
- Stats at Basketball Reference

Carl Marvin Meinhold (March 29, 1926 – February 23, 2019) was an American professional basketball player.

== Early life ==
A 6'2" guard/forward from Long Island University, Meinhold played two seasons (1947–1949) in the Basketball Association of America as a member of the Baltimore Bullets, Providence Steamrollers and Chicago Stags, He averaged 5.3 points per game in his BAA career and won a league championship with Baltimore in 1948. In 1953-54 he played for the Washington Generals, a team which toured with (and generally lost to) the Harlem Globetrotters. Meinhold was named to the all-league first team while playing for the Berwick Carbuilders of the Eastern Professional Basketball League in 1954.

Meinhold attended Hazleton High School in Hazleton, Pennsylvania, where in 1944 he led the team to a Pennsylvania state title, scoring 25 points in the final.

== BAA career statistics ==
Legend
GP	Games played	GS	Games started	MPG	Minutes per game
FG%	Field goal percentage	3P%	3-point field goal percentage	FT%	Free throw percentage
RPG	Rebounds per game	APG	Assists per game	SPG	Steals per game
BPG	Blocks per game	PPG	Points per game	**Bold**	Career high
†	Won an NBA championship

=== Regular season ===
Year	Team	GP	FG%	FT%	APG	PPG
1947–48†	Baltimore	**48**	.303	.617	.3	5.3
1948–49	Providence	35	.315	.627	**1.1**	**6.3**
1948–49	Chicago	15	**.444**	**.692**	.6	2.7
Career		98	.316	.628	.6	5.3

=== Playoffs ===
Year	Team	GP	FG%	FT%	APG	PPG
1948†	Baltimore	11	.254	.462	.0	3.6
Career		11	.254	.462	.0	3.6
