= Kristaps Porziņģis =

Latvian basketball player (born 1995)

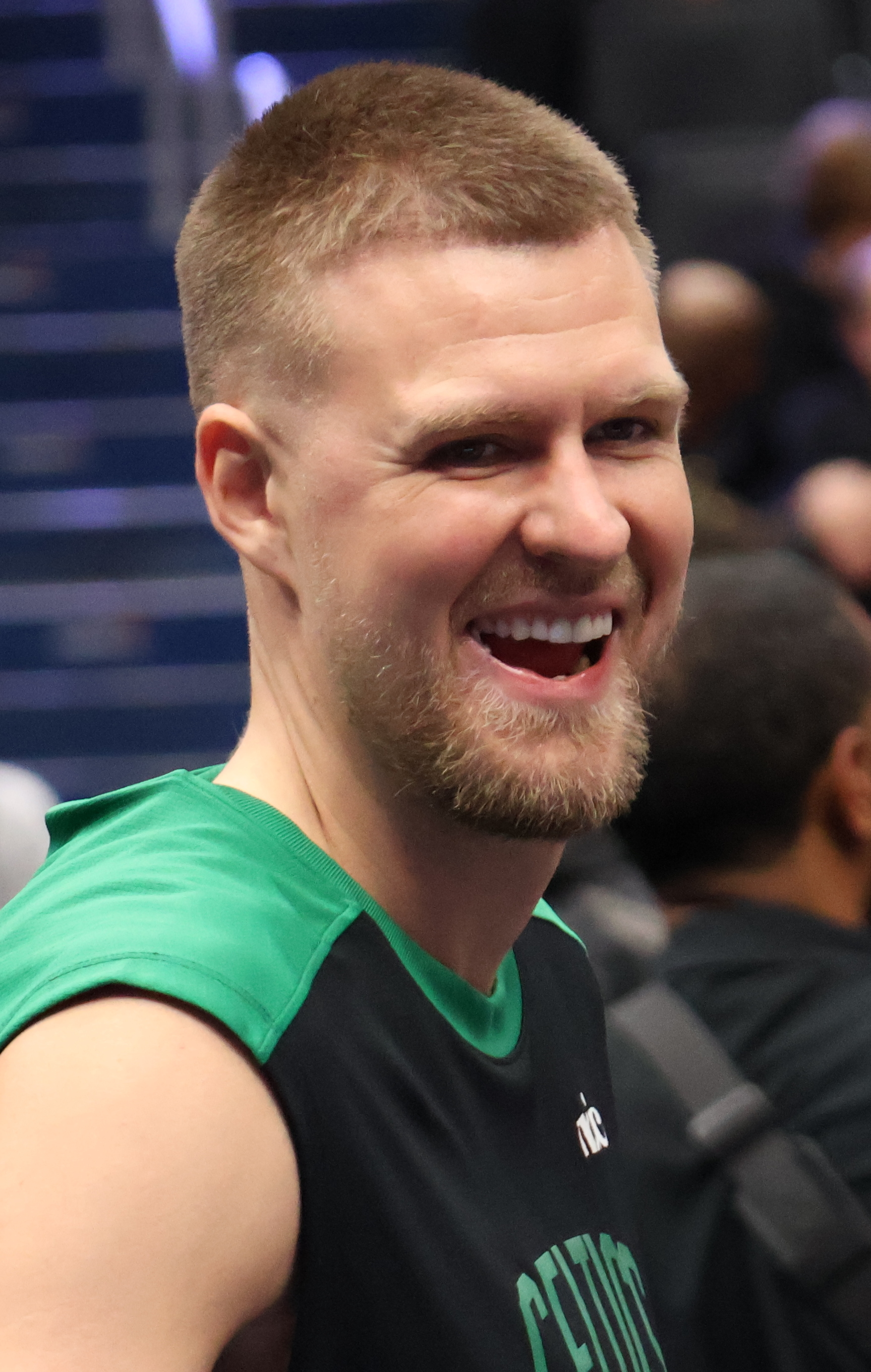
- Porziņģis with the Boston Celtics in 2024

No. 7 – Golden State Warriors
- Position: Center / power forward
- League: NBA

Personal information
- Born: 2 August 1995 (age 31) Liepāja, Latvia
- Listed height: 7 ft 2 in (2.18 m) (Note: In 2019, Porziņģis was measured to be 7 ft 2 3/4 in (2.20 m) barefoot.)
- Listed weight: 240 lb (109 kg)

Career information
- NBA draft: 2015: 1st round, 4th overall pick
- Drafted by: New York Knicks
- Playing career: 2012–present

Career history
- 2012–2015: Baloncesto Sevilla
- 2012–2013: →Baloncesto Sevilla B
- 2015–2019: New York Knicks
- 2019–2022: Dallas Mavericks
- 2022–2023: Washington Wizards
- 2023–2025: Boston Celtics
- 2025–2026: Atlanta Hawks
- 2026–present: Golden State Warriors

Career highlights
- NBA champion (2024); NBA All-Star (2018); NBA All-Rookie First Team (2016); EuroCup Rising Star (2015); 2× ACB All-Young Players Team (2014, 2015)
- Stats at NBA.com
- Stats at Basketball Reference

Kristaps Porziņģis (Latvian pronunciation: [ˈkris.taps ˈpuɔr.ziɲ.ɟis]; born 2 August 1995) is a Latvian professional basketball player for the Golden State Warriors of the National Basketball Association (NBA). Nicknamed "the Unicorn" for his ability to make plays and shoot three-pointers as a center, Porziņģis is listed at 7 ft 2 in (2.18 m) (Note: Porziņģis was measured to be 7 ft 2 3/4 in (2.20 m) barefoot prior to the 2019–20 season.) and plays as a power forward and center.

Born in Liepāja, Porziņģis began his professional career with Sevilla in 2012. Porziņģis quickly rose through the team's youth ranks and became the figurehead of the senior team by 2013. He subsequently won the EuroCup Basketball Rising Star award in 2015, where, at age 19, Porziņģis became the youngest-ever recipient of the award. The following summer, he declared for the NBA draft and was selected fourth overall by the New York Knicks.

In New York, Porziņģis was seen as one of the Knicks' potential cornerstones, and he was selected as an All-Star in 2018. However, disagreements with the front office led Porziņģis to be traded to the Dallas Mavericks in 2019. In Dallas, he was plagued by injuries and inconsistent play and was traded to the Washington Wizards in 2022. In Washington, Porziņģis bounced back, but was traded to the Boston Celtics in 2023 as part of the Wizards' front office's desire to rebuild. He won an NBA championship with the Celtics in 2024 before being traded to the Atlanta Hawks in 2025.

== Early career ==
Porziņģis followed in his parents' footsteps and started playing basketball at age six. Once he turned 12, his older brother, Jānis, who played professionally in Europe, took Porziņģis to offseason training sessions. He played in youth competitions with BK Liepājas Lauvas, the most famous club based in his hometown of Liepāja, until age 15. An agent from Latvia sent video of Porziņģis around this time to teams in Spain and Italy. In 2010, Baloncesto Sevilla, a club that had a professional team competing in the Liga ACB in Spain, called Porziņģis for a tryout in an attempt to recruit foreign talent to its junior squads. He stood 6 ft 8 in (2.03 m) and weighed 157 lb (71 kg) at this time. Porziņģis recalled the moment and said, "I came here with my brother for two or three days, but it was really hot and I couldn't play at my best because of that. Still, I received a contract in summer 2010 and I signed it." Inmaculada Avivar, a nutritionist for Sevilla, diagnosed that Porziņģis was suffering from anemia, meaning that he had fewer red blood cells. This caused Porziņģis to feel fatigue, shortness of breath, and inability to exercise. However, he gradually overcame the condition and began seeing improvement in his game. In addition to medical problems, Porziņģis had trouble picking up the language in Seville, making him reluctant to return there after his first tryout. In his first season playing for the junior squad, Porziņģis struggled to communicate with the coaching staff and his teammates and was often tired due to his health.

Porziņģis debuted for the youth squad on 4 January 2012 against its counterpart from Barcelona, adding 12 points and 10 rebounds. The opposing side was led by Alexander Zhigulin, who went on to enter the 2015 NBA draft and withdraw. However, Sevilla was defeated, 56–75. This game was part of the Ciutat de L'Hospitalet tournament, which led up to the Nike International Junior Tournament (NIJT). The following day, Porziņģis scored a personal best of 16 points on the Spars Sarajevo youth squad, helping Sevilla beat their opponents by a margin of eight points. Porziņģis said, "I knew it was a prestigious tournament and that I had to do well. I think I could have done much better, but I wasn't physically 100 percent. I have seen videos and could have been much more aggressive. But I wish I could have played better." He finished the tournament averaging 9.2 points, 4.8 rebounds and 2.6 blocks.

Porziņģis represented the Sevilla junior team again at the same tournament in early 2013. Against Union Olimpija on 4 January, he recorded 15 points and six rebounds. Two days later in the team's tournament finale vs Real Madrid's youth squad, Porziņģis scored 24 points and grabbed 11 rebounds. He also made five three-pointers. Porziņģis proved to be more effective in his second year, averaging 16.6 points, 8.4 rebounds and 2.6 blocks and shooting .481 on three-pointers. This was his final stint in the youth categories of Sevilla.

== Professional career ==
=== Sevilla (2012–2015) ===
==== 2012–13: Rookie season ====
Entering the 2012–13 ACB season, Sevilla had hired Aíto García Reneses, who previously worked with the likes of Pau Gasol, Juan Carlos Navarro, Ricky Rubio and Rudy Fernández. On 29 September 2012, Porziņģis got the opportunity to make an appearance with the club's first team, but was allowed to play for only a minute. Sevilla took a tremendous loss to CB Murcia. Following a return to the youth categories of the club at the Torneig de Bàsquet Junior Ciutat de L'Hospitalet, Porziņģis went back to competing for the senior squad. On 16 January 2013, he logged only four minutes against Spartak Saint Petersburg in the EuroCup, scoring no points, but contributing a rebound and an assist. Porziņģis scored his first basket for the senior team on 20 February, in a rematch with Spartak. Porziņģis said, "I was very nervous at the beginning: I wanted to do well and not pick up turnovers. At the same time, I got a lot of confidence with players of my same age. That allowed me to play better with the first team and practice with more confidence." On 4 May, Porziņģis posted a season-high seven points with the senior team, hitting two of three shots vs Bilbao Basket in ACB competition.

==== 2013–14: Second season and NBA consideration ====
Porziņģis opened his second season on Sevilla's main squad strong in his third game against the EuroLeague team Laboral Kutxa, leading them to a 20-point ACB victory on 2 November 2013. He notched 12 points, six rebounds and four blocks. Porziņģis broke his scoring record once more against Real Madrid on 30 November 2013, nearly leading his team to a victory. Against the very same team on 6 April 2014, Porziņģis scored a career-high 20 points, nailing two three-pointers. Despite his team losing, Porziņģis began to trend on social media due to his performance. Porziņģis said, "It was a very good game for me on offense. I didn't get any rebounds in that game. I had a good shooting night, but could have helped more on defense. Still, fans in Madrid gave me a nice ovation when I fouled out and I liked that a lot." On 25 May, he got the chance to face his idol Justin Doellman of Barcelona, whom he called the "best power forward in Spanish basketball". Porziņģis scored 14 points against Doellman's team. In May 2014, Porziņģis was selected in the ACB All-Young Players Team of the 2013–14 season.

In April, Porziņģis declared himself eligible for the 2014 NBA draft. Before and after he made the decision, Porziņģis drew interest from National Basketball Association (NBA) teams such as the Orlando Magic, who held the 12th overall pick, and traveled to Europe to scout him. The Oklahoma City Thunder reportedly were certainly going to select Porziņģis with the 21st pick in the case that he remained. Porziņģis was considered an unfinished product and a top-15 draft pick. According to DraftExpress.com, he was the fourth-youngest prospect in their top-100 rankings. However, Porziņģis withdrew his name shortly before the draft. Porziņģis's agent Andy Miller released the information to ESPN, saying that his client did not feel prepared to become a part of the NBA and wanted to develop his skills until the 2015 draft. One of the league's general managers commented on Porziņģis, "He's very talented. He wasn't ready, but we would've seriously considered drafting him anyway. If he continues to develop his game, get more minutes and his body develops, I think he could be a top-five pick in 2015. He has that kind of talent."

==== 2014–15: EuroCup Rising Star ====
Prior to the 2014–15 ACB season, head coach Aíto García Reneses parted ways with Sevilla. On 4 October 2014, against CB 1939 Canarias, Porziņģis made his season debut in the Liga ACB, scoring three points in the game. Porziņģis made his first appearance at the 2014–15 EuroCup on 15 October against EWE Baskets Oldenburg and scored two points. However, Porziņģis had a strong EuroCup performance against Pallacanestro Virtus Roma in the weeks that followed, in which he contributed 18 points, seven rebounds, four assists, four steals and two blocks. Porziņģis recorded a double-double in mid-November in a win over Estudiantes, adding 11 points and 11 rebounds. On 11 February 2015, he scored a season-high 19 points against the EuroCup's Turów Zgorzelec. Porziņģis tied this record on 18 April, vs. Bàsquet Manresa in the ACB. Three days earlier, Porziņģis was named the winner of the EuroCup Rising Star Award of the season. A month later, he repeated in the ACB All-Young Players Team, after avoiding the relegation with Baloncesto Sevilla.

=== New York Knicks (2015–2019) ===
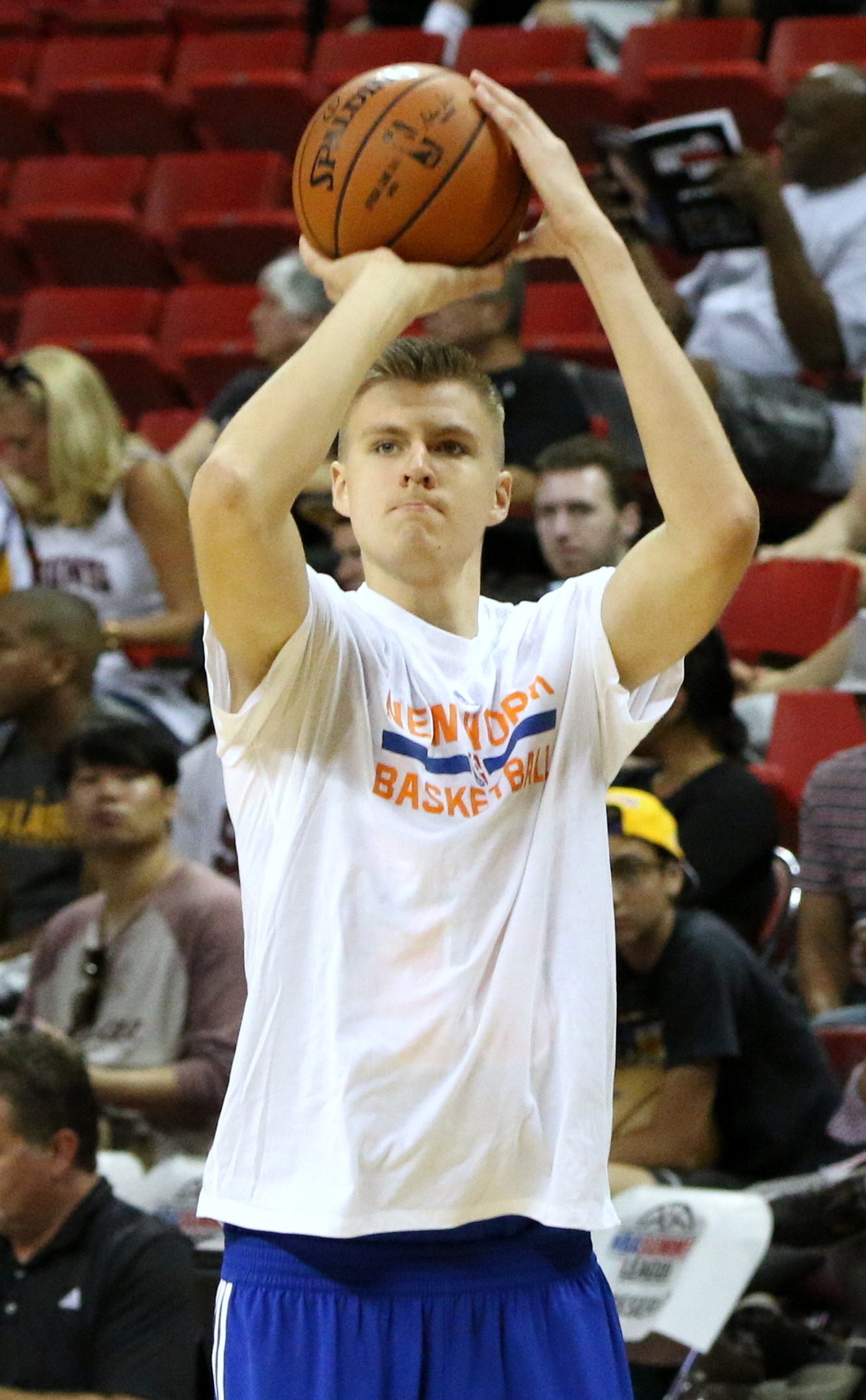
Porziņģis during 2015 NBA Summer League

On 16 April 2015, Porziņģis entered the 2015 NBA draft, according to a report from agent Andy Miller. After gaining a season more of experience, Porziņģis became known as a lottery pick and a potential top-five selection. He drew interest from teams such as the Los Angeles Lakers, who had the No. 2 pick and had several personnel that had seen Porziņģis play in Spain. Porziņģis was compared with players such as Pau Gasol and Dirk Nowitzki, but also Darko Miličić, a former lottery selection widely considered a draft bust. Adrian Wojnarowski of Yahoo! Sports wrote, "Porziņģis has an innate awareness about the way the American public sees a young, long European teenager. He comes to the NBA with the full understanding that popular basketball culture declares him guilty until proven innocent of the basketball crimes of Darko Miličić and Nikoloz Tskitishvili and Andrea Bargnani. He's considered a stiff, a bust, a blown lottery pick until he doesn't become one..."

On 25 June 2015, Porziņģis was selected with the fourth overall pick in the 2015 NBA draft by the New York Knicks. He was booed by some New York fans upon being drafted, but vowed to change the fans' opinions on him from negative to positive. On the same night, the Knicks traded for Porziņģis' teammate from Sevilla, Willy Hernangómez, who was originally drafted by the Philadelphia 76ers as a 35th overall pick. Porziņģis became the highest drafted Latvian and Baltic player in NBA history.

==== 2015–16: Rookie season ====
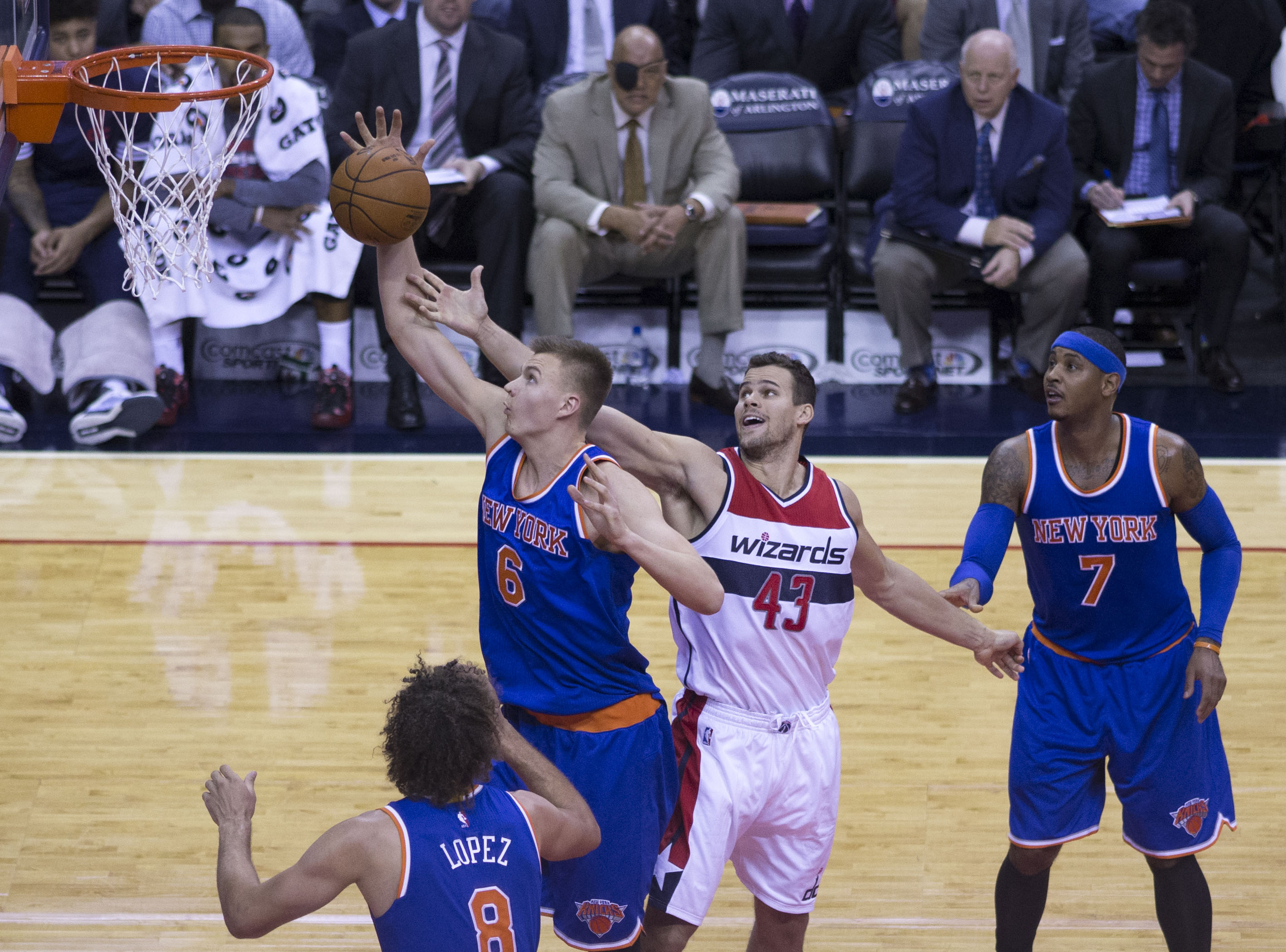
Porziņģis on 31 October 2015, in his third NBA game

On 30 July 2015, Porziņģis signed his rookie-scale contract with the Knicks. On 28 October, Porziņģis scored 16 points in his NBA debut, leading New York to a 122–97 season-opening victory over the Milwaukee Bucks. He was 3-of-11 from the field and 9-of-12 from the line. On 21 November, Porziņģis had 24 points, 14 rebounds and seven blocked shots to lead the Knicks to a 107–102 victory over the Houston Rockets, becoming the first 20-year-old to post such a stat line in a single game since Shaquille O'Neal in 1992–93, and the first rookie to reach those totals since Tim Duncan in 1998.

On 3 December 2015, Porziņģis was named Eastern Conference Rookie of the Month for games played in October and November. He ranked third among all rookies in scoring (13.7 ppg) and was second in rebounding (9.3 rpg) and blocked shots (1.89 bpg) for October and November. Porziņģis also went on to claim Eastern Conference Rookie of the Month honours for December and January. On 12 February 2016, he scored 30 points for Team World in the Rising Stars Challenge. On 23 March, Porziņģis tied a then-career high with 29 points and grabbed 10 rebounds in a 115–107 win over the Chicago Bulls. He was one point short of becoming the first rookie since Patrick Ewing to put up 30 points and 10 rebounds in a single game for the Knicks.

Porziņģis appeared in 72 of the Knicks' 82 games in 2015–16, missing the final seven games of the season due to a right shoulder strain. He finished with averages of 14.3 points, 7.3 rebounds, 1.3 assists and 1.9 blocks per game. Porziņģis finished second in the NBA Rookie of the Year Award voting behind winner Karl-Anthony Towns, and earned NBA All-Rookie First Team honors.

==== 2016–18: Promising years ====
On 16 November 2016, Porziņģis scored a then-career-high 35 points in a 105–102 victory over the Detroit Pistons. On 11 December, he recorded 26 points, 12 rebounds and a career-high-tying seven blocks in a 118–112 victory over the Los Angeles Lakers. On 19 January 2017, Porziņģis came off the bench for the first time in his NBA career after returning from a four-game absence due to a sore left Achilles tendon. Porziņģis subsequently scored 15 points in a 113–110 loss to the Washington Wizards. During the 2017 All-Star Weekend, he played for Team World in the Rising Stars Challenge and won the Skills Challenge.

In the Knicks' season opener the following season, on 19 October 2017, Porziņģis had 31 points and 12 rebounds in a 105–84 loss to the Oklahoma City Thunder. On 30 October, he scored a then-career-high 38 points in a 116–110 victory over the Denver Nuggets. On 5 November, Porziņģis set a then-career high with 40 points in a 108–101 victory over the Indiana Pacers. He was subsequently named Eastern Conference Player of the Week for games played from Monday, 30 October through Sunday, 5 November. Porziņģis recorded the best start to a season in Knicks history, earning 300 points through 10 games, two more than Bernard King had to open the 1984–85 season. His strong performance continued through the midpoint of the season, and on 23 January 2018, Porziņģis was named an Eastern Conference All-Star reserve.

However, on 6 February 2018, in a 103–89 loss to the Milwaukee Bucks, Porziņģis tore his left ACL and was subsequently ruled out for the rest of the season.

==== 2018–19: Injury and recovery ====
In October 2018, the Knicks decided against signing Porziņģis to a rookie extension, a move that gave New York an extra $10 million in cap space in the summer of 2019 while making Porziņģis a restricted free agent in the offseason. Due to recovering from his ACL injury, Porziņģis did not play for the Knicks to begin the 2018–19 season.

=== Dallas Mavericks (2019–2022) ===
On 31 January 2019, after a meeting with the Knicks left franchise officials with the impression that Porziņģis wanted to be traded, he was traded alongside Trey Burke, Courtney Lee and Tim Hardaway Jr. to the Dallas Mavericks in exchange for DeAndre Jordan, Wesley Matthews, Dennis Smith Jr., an unprotected 2021 first-round draft pick, and an additional top-ten protected 2023 first-round draft pick. Porziņģis sat out for the rest of the 2018–19 season, healing from his ACL injury. On 12 July, Porziņģis agreed to re-sign with the Mavericks on a five-year maximum contract worth $158 million.

==== 2019–20: Playoff debut ====
Porziņģis debuted for the Mavericks on 23 October 2019, posting 23 points and four rebounds in a 108–100 win over the Washington Wizards. On 31 January 2020, he scored a then season-high 35 points, along with 12 rebounds in a 128–121 loss to the Houston Rockets. Three days later, that season high was surpassed with a 38-point, 12-rebound performance in a 112–103 victory over the Indiana Pacers. On 5 February, Porziņģis followed that up with 32 points and 12 rebounds in a 121–107 loss to the Memphis Grizzlies, before leaving the game with a broken nose. On 1 March, Porziņģis matched his then season-high 38 points, along with 14 rebounds and five blocks, in a 111–91 victory over the Minnesota Timberwolves. Three days later, he had 34 points, 12 rebounds, and five blocks in a 127–123 overtime victory over the New Orleans Pelicans, becoming the first player since Shaquille O'Neal in 2000 to have consecutive 30-point, five-block games. The next day, Porziņģis was named the Western Conference player of the week, his second time to earn Player of the Week honors. From 25 February to 1 March, Porziņģis averaged 26.3 points per game, 11.8 rebounds per game and 2.3 blocks per game. The Mavericks recorded a 3–1 record in that stretch. On 31 July, Porziņģis recorded a season-high 39 points, as well as 16 rebounds, in a 153–149 overtime loss to the Houston Rockets. This was the Mavericks' first game in the Orlando bubble, returning from a four-month hiatus due to the COVID-19 pandemic. Porziņģis finished his bubble play strong, averaging 30.5 points, 9.5 rebounds, 2.2 assists and 1.5 blocks per game across six games, earning him All Seeding Games Second Team honors.

On 17 August, Porziņģis made his NBA playoff debut in a 118–110 loss in Game 1 to the Los Angeles Clippers, recording 14 points and six rebounds before being ejected early in the third quarter following an altercation with Marcus Morris Sr. Two days later in Game 2, Porziņģis helped the Mavericks even up the series with a 23-point and seven-rebound performance in a 127–114 victory before posting 34 points and 13 rebounds in a 130–122 loss in Game 3. However, he missed the rest of the series with a lateral meniscus tear and Dallas was eliminated in six games.

==== 2020–21: Playoff fallout ====
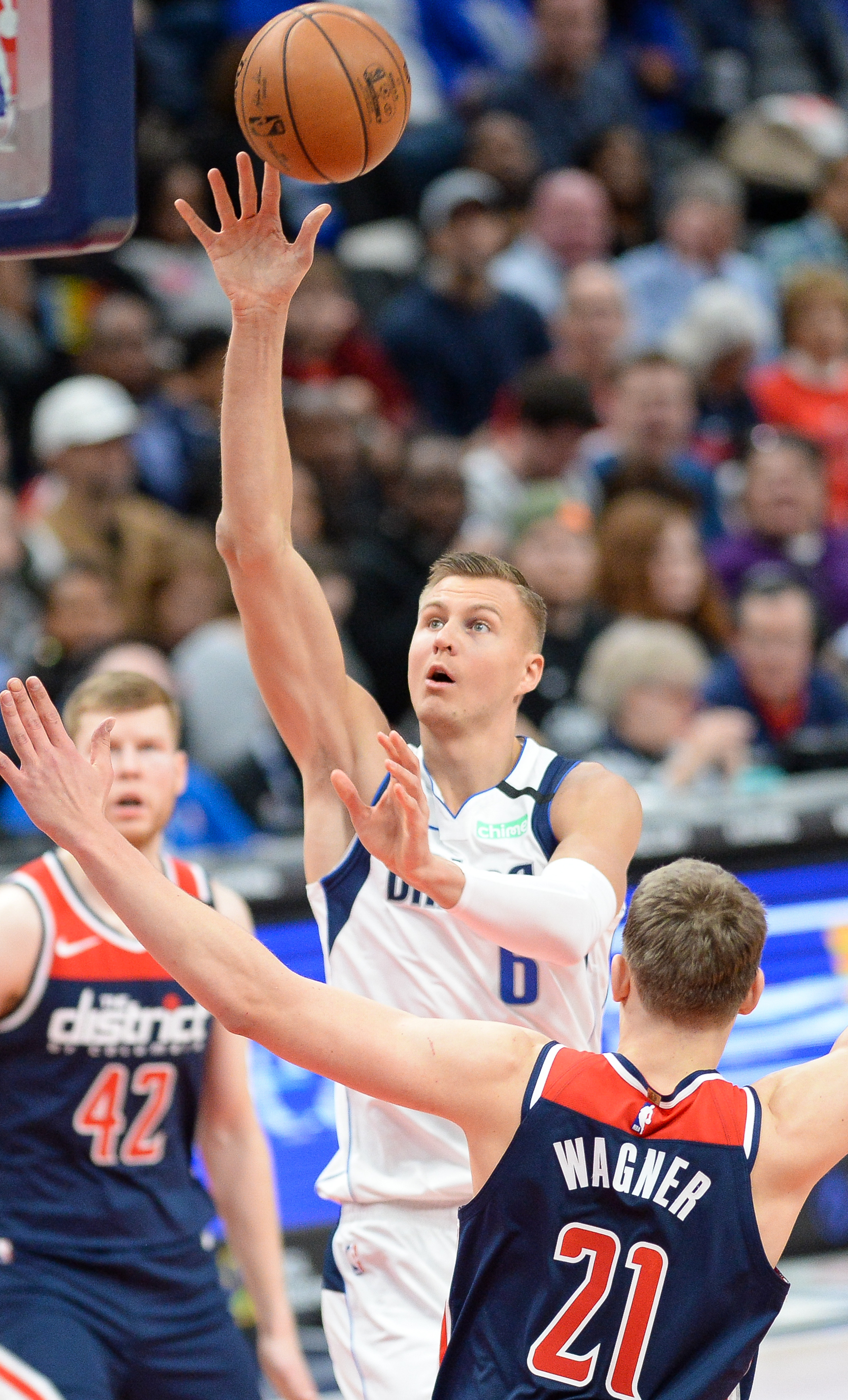
Porziņģis in 2020

Porziņģis had surgery on his torn lateral meniscus on 9 October 2020. Porziņģis went on to miss the first nine games of the 2020-21 NBA season recovering from surgery. He made his season debut on 13 January 2021, against the Charlotte Hornets, where he scored 16 points while held to a 21-minute restriction. As a precautionary measure, Porziņģis did not play in the majority of back-to-back games during the regular season. On 12 February, he scored a season-high 36 points with a career-high eight made three pointers in a 143–130 victory over the New Orleans Pelicans. On 26 March, Porziņģis tied a career high by grabbing 18 rebounds in a 109–94 loss to the Indiana Pacers. Dallas improved on their previous season record and finished the 2020–21 season with a 42–30 record. The Mavericks clinched the Southwest division for the first time since the 2009–10 season following a 110–90 victory over the Cleveland Cavaliers on 7 May. Porziņģis finished the season averaging 20.1 points per game and 8.9 rebounds per game. The 2020–21 season proved to be his most efficient season of his career thus far, posting career highs in eFG%, TS% and FG% statistics. Porziņģis became just the sixth player in franchise history to have multiple seasons averaging over 20 points per game, joining Mark Aguirre, Rolando Blackman, Luka Dončić, Michael Finley and Dirk Nowitzki.

However, Porziņģis' numbers dropped drastically during the first round of the playoffs, averaging 13.1 points per game and grabbing 5.4 rebounds per game. The Mavericks went on to lose in the first round to the Los Angeles Clippers for the second consecutive season in seven games. Following the series, Porziņģis was roundly mocked by fans for his subpar performance during the series, with many calling him "Pandemic P", a name originally used for mocking Paul George for his abysmal performance during the 2020 playoffs. Porziņģis was disgruntled with his role in the first round series against the Clippers, often being relegated to a decoy or three-point spacing threat. Rumors of Porziņģis wanting a trade in the offseason began to form, but nothing came of it. He began training for the upcoming season. In an Instagram post, Porziņģis vowed to come back stronger and more refined and that the Unicorn 2.0 was incoming.

==== 2021–22 season: Final season in Dallas ====
Following the 2021 playoffs, the Mavericks parted ways with long time head coach Rick Carlisle who resigned from his position as head coach after 13 seasons. Jason Kidd was hired as the team's new head coach, marking Porziņģis' sixth head coach in seven NBA seasons. The 2021 offseason was the first offseason that Porziņģis was not recovering from injury since entering the league in 2015.

Porziņģis recorded 11 points, five rebounds and two blocks during the season-opening 113–87 loss to the Atlanta Hawks on 21 October 2021. He played three games before missing a string of games with lower back tightness. Porziņģis returned to action against the Boston Celtics on 6 November, scoring 21 points and grabbed seven rebounds. He scored 10 of his points in the fourth quarter, including a put-back dunk to tie the game at 104 and the Mavericks went on to win 107–104. Porziņģis scored a then-season-high 32 points in a 123–109 victory over the San Antonio Spurs on 12 November. He then had another then-season-high 34 points in a 132–117 victory over the Portland Trail Blazers on 27 December.

=== Washington Wizards (2022–2023) ===
==== 2021–22 and 2022–23 seasons: Missing the playoffs ====
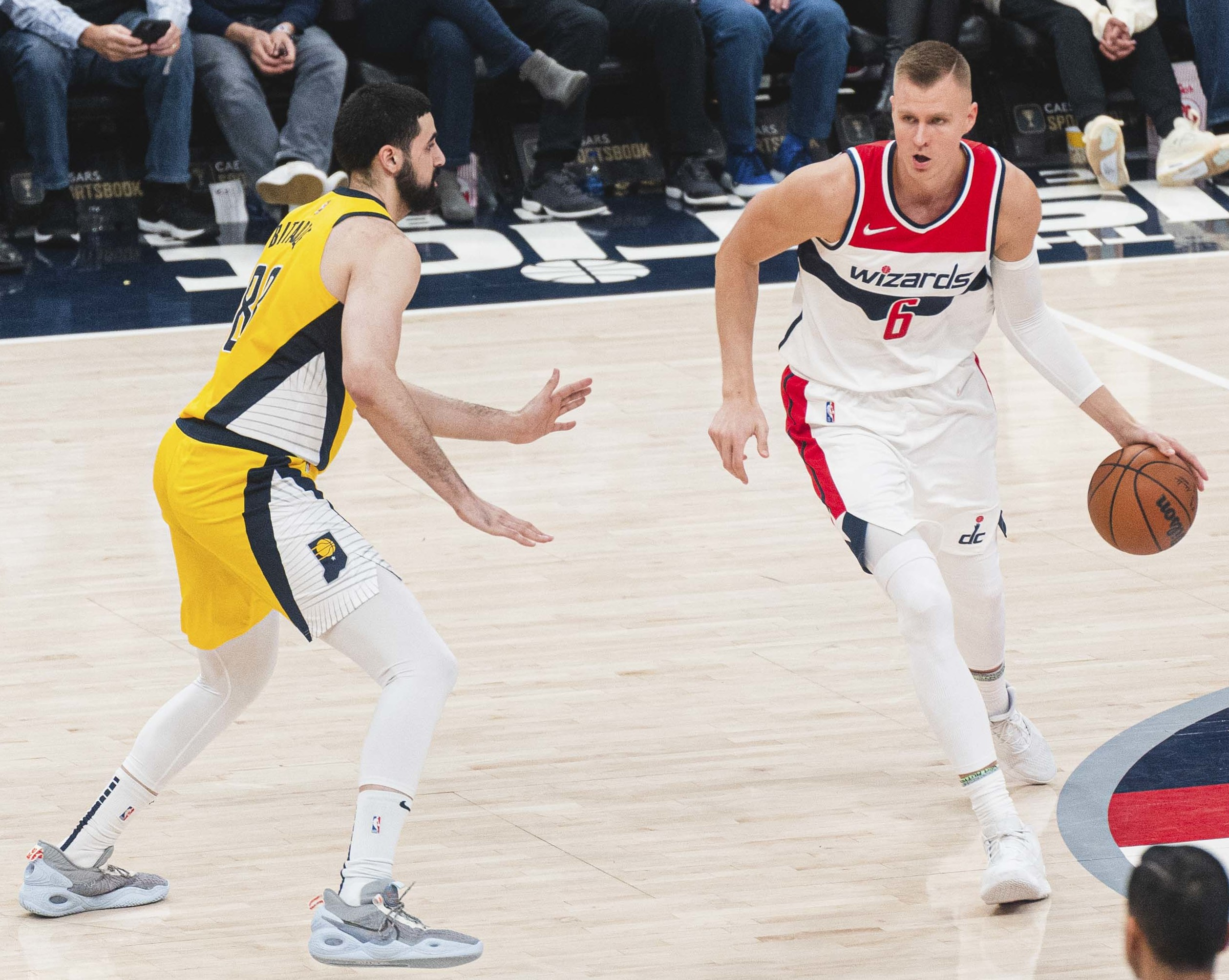
Porziņģis in action against the Indiana Pacers in 2022

On 10 February 2022, the Mavericks traded Porziņģis and a protected 2022 second-round pick to the Washington Wizards in exchange for Spencer Dinwiddie and Dāvis Bertāns. Porziņģis played his first game as a Wizard on 6 March, scoring 25 points against the Pacers. On 19 March, Porziņģis led the Wizards to a 127–119 comeback victory over the Los Angeles Lakers, which featured Porziņģis posterizing LeBron James for a dunk during crunch time. On 30 March, Porziņģis dropped a season-high 35 points in a 127–110 victory over the Orlando Magic. He then recorded 24 points against the Mavericks, his former team, in a 135–103 victory. The Wizards ultimately failed to make both the playoffs and the play-in tournament, finishing with a 35–47 record.

The following season, on 12 November 2022, Porziņģis recorded a double-double with 31 points and 10 rebounds in a 121–112 victory over the Utah Jazz. On 28 November, he scored a then-career-high 41 points in a 142–127 victory over the Minnesota Timberwolves. In the next game, Porziņģis recorded 27 points and a career-high 19 rebounds in a 113–107 loss to the Brooklyn Nets. On 2 January 2023, he was named the NBA Eastern Conference Player of the Week for Week 11 (26 December – 1 January), his third career NBA Player of the Week award and first with the Wizards. Porziņģis helped lead the Wizards to an undefeated 4–0 week with averages of 24.5 points, 8.5 rebounds and 2.5 blocks. On 8 March, he scored a career-high 43 points on 17-of-22 shooting from the field and 7-of-10 shooting from three-point range along with five rebounds and five assists in a narrow 122–120 loss to the Atlanta Hawks. Despite averaging a career-high 23.2 points per game on a career-high 49.8% field goal shooting percentage, the Wizards once again missed the play-in tournament, finishing with a 35–47 record for the second straight year.

=== Boston Celtics (2023–2025) ===
==== 2023–24 season: First NBA championship ====
On 23 June 2023, the Wizards traded Porziņģis to the Boston Celtics as part of a three-team deal that sent Marcus Smart to the Memphis Grizzlies and Tyus Jones to Washington. Boston also received a 2023 first-round pick (pick No. 25) and a top-four-protected 2024 first-round pick (via Golden State Warriors) from the Grizzlies while Washington acquired Danilo Gallinari, Mike Muscala and Boston's 2023 second-round pick (pick No. 35). Porziņģis chose to wear number 8 with the Celtics as his usual number 6 was retired for Bill Russell. On 12 July, he would sign a two-year, $60 million extension through the 2025–26 season.

Porziņģis made his Celtics debut on 25 October 2023 in a return to Madison Square Garden against the New York Knicks, propelling Boston to a 108–104 season-opening victory while recording 30 points, eight rebounds and four blocks, including 15 points in the first quarter alone. His 30 points set a then record for the most points scored in a debut in Celtics history. On 28 December, Porziņģis had a season-high 35 points and eight rebounds in a 128–122 overtime victory over the Detroit Pistons. He was named the Eastern Conference Player of the Week during the penultimate week of the regular season.

The Celtics made the playoffs as the first seed in the Eastern Conference, and faced the Miami Heat in the first round. Porziņģis suffered a calf strain in Game 4 on 29 April 2024, and he missed the rest of that series. Porziņģis also missed the entirety of the Celtics' next two series against the Cleveland Cavaliers and Indiana Pacers, as the Celtics advanced to the 2024 NBA Finals to face the Dallas Mavericks, his former team. Porziņģis returned for Game 1 of the Finals on 6 June, coming off the bench and scoring 18 of his 20 points in the first half. Three days later, in Game 2, Porziņģis developed a new injury with a "torn medial retinaculum, allowing dislocation of the posterior tibialis tendon" in his left leg that was considered completely unrelated to the previous calf injury he had dealt with for most of the playoffs. Despite missing the next two games, Porziņģis returned in Game 5 on 17 June, where he scored five points and helped the Celtics secure their record-setting 18th championship.

==== 2024–25 season: Recovery from injury ====
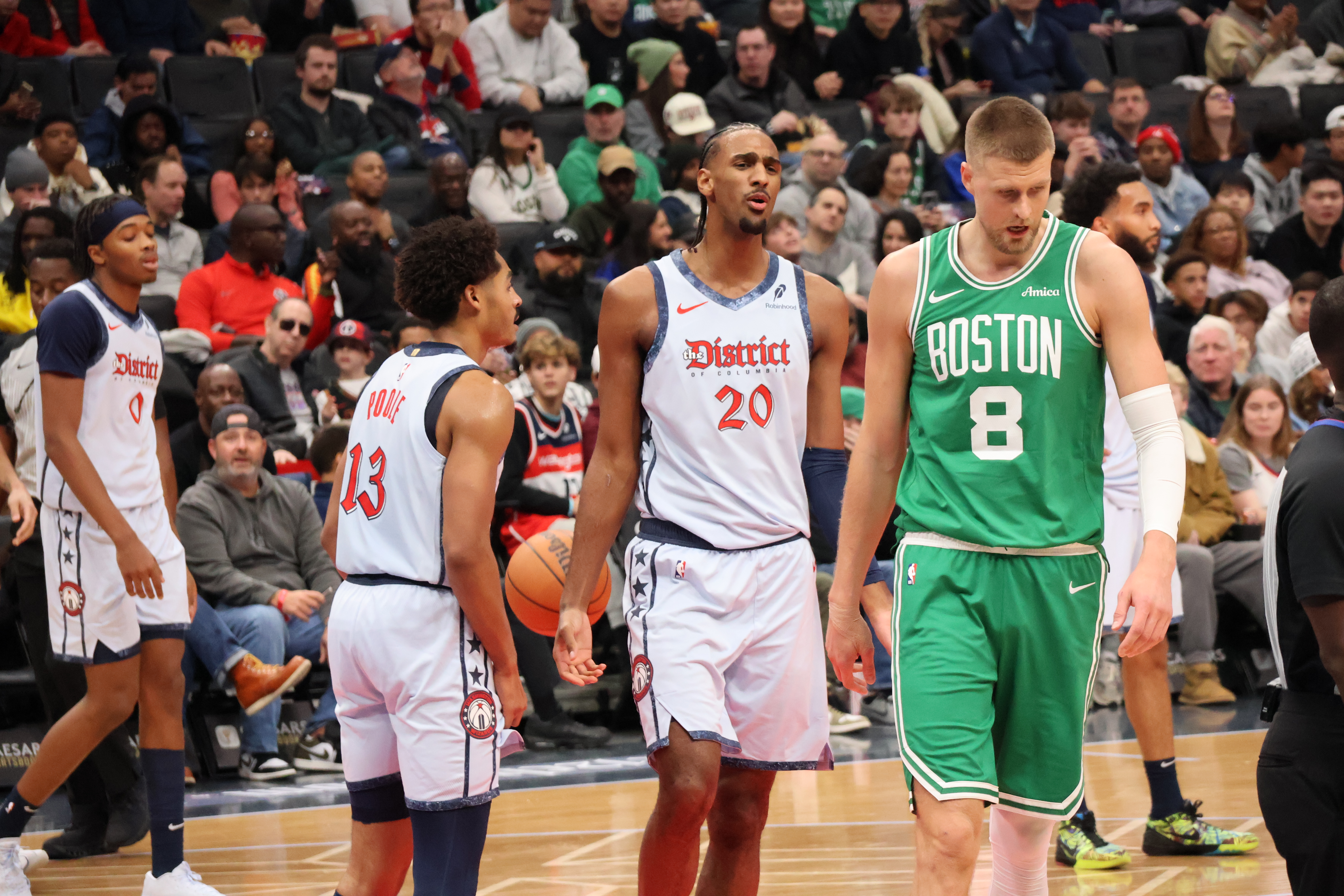
Porziņģis (no. 8) playing for the Celtics in December 2024

On 27 June 2024, Porziņģis underwent surgery to repair his retinaculum injury with a recovery timetable being set at five to six months, ruling Porziņģis out for the beginning of the 2024–25 NBA season.

After missing the first month of the season, Porziņģis made his season debut on 25 November 2024 against the Los Angeles Clippers, where he recorded 16 points, six rebounds, two assists, and two blocks in the 126–94 victory.

=== Atlanta Hawks (2025–2026) ===
On 24 June 2025, Shams Charania of ESPN reported that the Celtics, Atlanta Hawks and Brooklyn Nets agreed to a three-team trade that would send Porziņģis and a second-round pick to the Hawks, Georges Niang and a second-round pick to the Celtics, and Terance Mann and the 22nd pick in the 2025 NBA draft—used to select Drake Powell—to the Nets. The trade was formally announced on 7 July, due to the July moratorium that was in effect for the 2025–26 NBA season until 6 July. Porziņģis made 17 appearances (including 12 starts) for Atlanta, posting averages of 17.1 points, 5.1 rebounds and 2.7 assists.

In 2025, Porziņģis was diagnosed with postural orthostatic tachycardia syndrome (POTS), a neurological disease that can be triggered by viral infections, especially SARS-CoV-2, the virus causing COVID-19 which causes this syndrome in about 1% of infected people.

=== Golden State Warriors (2026–present) ===
On 5 February 2026, Porziņģis was traded to the Golden State Warriors in exchange for guard Buddy Hield and forward Jonathan Kuminga. He made 15 appearances (including 11 starts) for Golden State, averaging 16.1 points, 5.3 rebounds, and 2.3 assists.

On 29 June 2026, Porziņģis re-signed with the Warriors on a two-year, $40 million contract.

On 6 November 2026, Porziņģis announced he was stepping away from basketball to ‘prioritise his health’.

== National team career ==
=== Junior national team ===
Porziņģis played with the Latvian youth team and was selected in the 2013 FIBA Europe Under-18 Championship All-Tournament Team.

=== Senior national team ===
In 2017, Porziņģis played for Latvia at EuroBasket 2017, where he averaged 23.6 points per game (ranked third), 5.9 rebounds per game (ranked 19th) and 1.9 blocks per game (ranked first). Latvia was eliminated in the quarterfinals by eventual champions Slovenia, losing 97–103. Against Slovenia, Porziņģis scored a tournament-high 34 points despite playing in foul trouble throughout the game. He scored 16 of his 34 points in the final period to help Latvia cut Slovenia's 13-point lead to two with two minutes remaining.

After a five-year absence, in August 2022, Porziņģis returned to play for the national team in the August window of the second round of the FIBA Basketball World Cup 2023 European Qualifiers. In two games, he averaged 25.5 points per game, 14.0 rebounds per game and 3.0 blocks per game. In a 111–85 victory over Turkey, Porziņģis scored 22 points, grabbed 14 rebounds and blocked six shots in just 22 minutes of playing. In Latvia's 87–80 victory over Great Britain, he had 14 rebounds and scored 29 points on 75% shooting.

== Player profile ==
"He's a guy I've always looked up to. It's not fair for me to be compared to a legend like him."

— Porziņģis on Dirk Nowitzki, August 2017

Porziņģis has been compared to Dirk Nowitzki, since both were trained in Europe before entering the NBA. Both Porziņģis and Nowitzki are seven-foot-plus players who are comfortable anywhere on the front line and can both shoot from the outside. During his rookie season, Kevin Durant dubbed Porziņģis a basketball "unicorn" because of his rare combination of size and skills. Although Porziņģis is currently listed at 7 ft 2 in (2.18 m) tall, he was measured to be closer to 7 ft 3 in (2.21 m) tall without shoes in 2019, which would put him among the tallest active NBA players. In January 2018, Porziņģis averaged 19 shot attempts per game for the Knicks, one of the most ever by a player his size (the only players taller than 7 ft 2 in (2.18 m) to average 15 field goal attempts per game were Ralph Sampson and Yao Ming). Due to his height and mobility, Porziņģis is able to shoot over most defenders, with his sheer size and high volume creating a unique advantage initially shared by no other player in the NBA. More recently, younger "unicorns" like Victor Wembanyama and Chet Holmgren have entered the league with playing styles often compared to Porziņģis.

== Career statistics ==
Legend
GP	Games played	GS	Games started	MPG	Minutes per game
FG%	Field goal percentage	3P%	3-point field goal percentage	FT%	Free throw percentage
RPG	Rebounds per game	APG	Assists per game	SPG	Steals per game
BPG	Blocks per game	PPG	Points per game	**Bold**	Career high
†	Won an NBA championship

=== NBA ===
==== Regular season ====
Year	Team	GP	GS	MPG	FG%	3P%	FT%	RPG	APG	SPG	BPG	PPG
2015–16	New York	**72**	**72**	28.4	.421	.333	.838	7.3	1.3	.7	1.9	14.3
2016–17	New York	66	65	**32.8**	.450	.357	.786	7.2	1.5	.7	2.0	18.1
2017–18	New York	48	48	32.4	.439	.395	.793	6.6	1.2	.8	**2.4**	22.7
2019–20	Dallas	57	57	31.8	.427	.352	.799	**9.5**	1.8	.7	2.0	20.4
2020–21	Dallas	43	43	30.9	.476	.376	.855	8.9	1.6	.5	1.3	20.1
2021–22	Dallas	34	34	29.5	.451	.283	.865	7.7	2.0	.7	1.7	19.2
2021–22	Washington	17	17	28.2	.475	.367	**.871**	8.8	**2.9**	.7	1.5	22.1
2022–23	Washington	65	65	32.6	.498	.385	.851	8.4	2.7	**.9**	1.5	**23.2**
2023–24†	Boston	57	57	29.6	**.516**	.375	.858	7.2	2.0	.7	1.9	20.1
2024–25	Boston	42	42	28.8	.483	**.412**	.809	6.8	2.1	.7	1.5	19.5
2025–26	Atlanta	17	12	24.3	.457	.360	.840	5.1	2.7	.5	1.3	17.1
2025–26	Golden State	15	11	23.7	.433	.311	.844	5.3	2.3	.6	1.1	16.1
Career		533	523	30.3	.461	.364	.830	7.6	1.9	.7	1.8	19.5

==== Playoffs ====
Year	Team	GP	GS	MPG	FG%	3P%	FT%	RPG	APG	SPG	BPG	PPG
2020	Dallas	3	3	31.5	**.525**	**.529**	.870	**8.7**	.7	.0	1.0	**23.7**
2021	Dallas	7	**7**	**33.3**	.472	.296	.842	5.4	**1.3**	**1.3**	.7	13.1
2024†	Boston	7	4	23.5	.467	.345	**.909**	4.4	1.1	.7	**1.6**	12.3
2025	Boston	**11**	**7**	21.0	.316	.154	.689	4.6	.7	.9	.8	7.7
Career		28	21	25.8	.430	.313	.798	5.2	1.0	.9	1.0	11.9

=== Europe ===
==== Liga ACB ====
Year	Team	GP	GS	MPG	FG%	3P%	FT%	RPG	APG	SPG	BPG	PPG
2012–13	Cajasol Sevilla	7	0	14.9	**.500**	**.500**	.667	.7	.0	.3	.1	2.6
2013–14	Cajasol Sevilla	32	32	14.9	.476	.333	.607	2.8	.3	.6	.9	6.7
2014–15	Baloncesto Sevilla	**34**	**34**	**21.7**	.471	.313	**.774**	**4.8**	**.4**	**.9**	**1.0**	**10.7**
Career		73	67	17.3	.474	.326	.730	3.5	.3	.7	.9	8.2

== Personal life ==
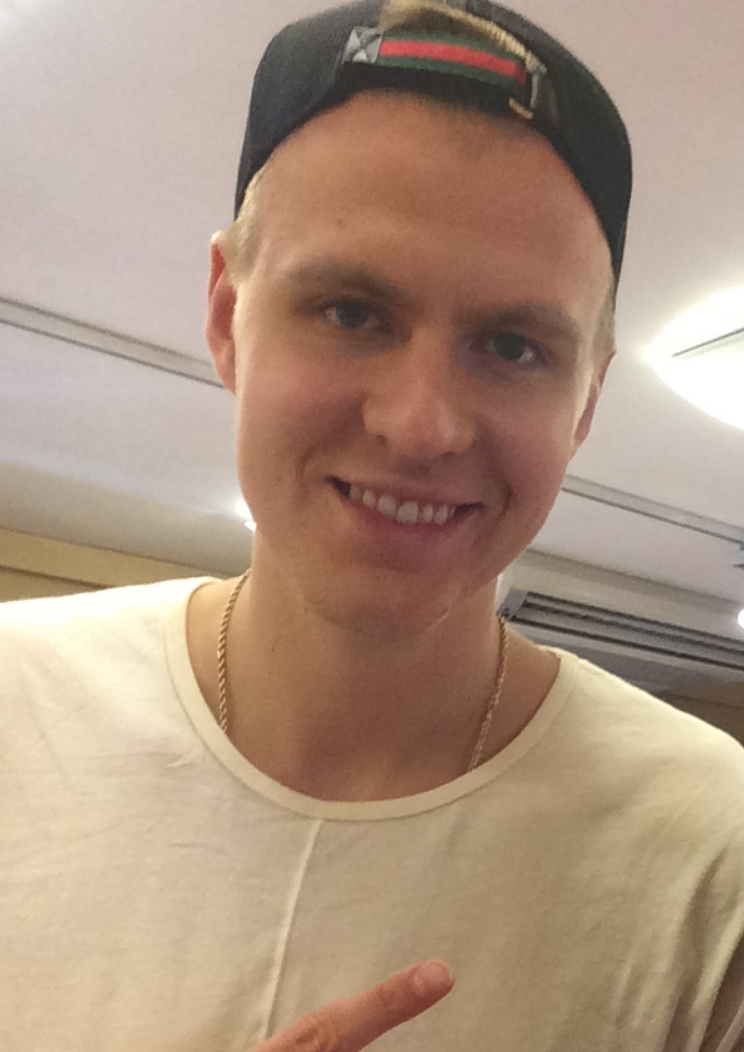
Porziņģis in 2017

Porziņģis was born to parents who had experience playing basketball. Tālis, his father, competed semi-professionally before becoming a bus driver. His mother, Ingrīda, was previously on Latvia women's youth national basketball team. His older brother, Jānis, also played professionally, while his oldest brother, Mārtiņš, who is approximately 15 years older than his youngest sibling, was also an avid player. In a 2017 E:60 documentary on Porziņģis' life, his parents revealed that they had another son, Toms, who was born four years before Kristaps and died at the age of 14 months. Through an interpreter, Ingrīda said about Toms' death, "It felt like a bulldozer had run over my life. We had two other children who we had to care for. We had to live on. After Kristaps was born, it was like he had to live for two lives."

Jānis Porziņģis competed at the European second tier EuroCup level, the same level in Europe that Kristaps later played at, in one game, and played European professional club basketball in various national leagues, including the Italian League, for more than 10 years. He is known to mentor his younger brother on and off the court and often called him after playing games for Cajasol Sevilla in Spain. Porziņģis talked about the relationship in an interview, "We'd break down the details. We watched the film together. He's always pushing me to work hard. We just spend a lot of time together and we just talk about basketball all the time..." The elder Porziņģis helped him train in the summer and work out in the gym in preparation for international competition in 2012.

Following two seasons in Spain and almost two years living in Seville, Porziņģis was able to speak Spanish far more fluently. He is thus fluent in three different languages, including English. An NBA executive said, "He speaks great English and I don't see it being that difficult of a transition off the court." In October 2016, Porziņģis signed a shoe deal with Adidas, the most lucrative deal for a European player. He made the switch to Adidas after partnering with Nike for his rookie season.

Porziņģis is a football fan and supports his hometown team FK Liepāja, as well as Real Madrid and former club Sevilla. Porziņģis is also an avid fan of Counter-Strike: Global Offensive, which he plays regularly.

In 2015, Porziņģis was named the Latvian Rising Star of the Year.

=== Rape allegation and possible extortion ===
In March 2019, it was publicly revealed that a woman accused Porziņģis of raping her at the Sky building in February 2018, hours after he tore his ACL. The woman reportedly told police she waited more than a year to come forward because she had discussed getting a $68,000 payout from Porziņģis to keep quiet. Porziņģis' attorney, Roland G. Riopelle, publicly denied the claim, and said he had previously referred the case to federal authorities due to the "accuser's extortionate demands."

== Notes ==
Awards
Preceded by Martins Dukurs	Latvian Sportsman of the Year; 2016, 2017	Succeeded by Oskars Melbārdis
Preceded by Jeļena Ostapenko	Latvian Rising Sports Personality of the Year; 2015	Succeeded by Rebeka Koha
