= Paul Hoffman (basketball) =

American basketball player-coach

Personal information
- Born: May 5, 1925 Jasper, Indiana, U.S.
- Died: November 12, 1998 (aged 73) Baltimore, Maryland, U.S.
- Listed height: 6 ft 2 in (1.88 m)
- Listed weight: 195 lb (88 kg)

Career information
- High school: Jasper (Jasper, Indiana)
- College: Purdue (1943–1947)
- BAA draft: 1947: 5th round, 42nd overall pick
- Drafted by: Toronto Huskies
- Playing career: 1947–1955
- Position: Guard / forward
- Number: 32, 11, 12, 14

Career history
- 1947–1954: Baltimore Bullets
- 1954–1955: New York Knicks
- 1955: Philadelphia Warriors

Career highlights
- BAA champion (1948); 3× Second–team All-American – Helms (1945–1947); Third-team All-American – Converse (1947)

Career BAA and NBA statistics
- Points: 3,234 (10.2 ppg)
- Rebounds: 1,129 (5.1 rpg)
- Assists: 911 (2.9 apg)
- Stats at NBA.com
- Stats at Basketball Reference

Paul Jacob Hoffman (May 5, 1925 – November 12, 1998) was an American professional basketball player.

== High school and college career ==
Hoffman, a 6'2" guard/forward, attended Jasper High School in Jasper, Indiana from 1939 to 1943; his coach was the legendary Cabby O'Neill. After high school, he attended Purdue University, where he played under head coach Ward Lambert. He became the only four time First Team-All Big Ten selection in Boilermaker history and one of the first two players to be selected in the NBA draft with teammate Bulbs Ehlers. He led Purdue in scoring all four seasons and won the MVP award for his performance in the 1947 All-American All-Star game at Madison Square Garden. Hoffman was a three-time second team Helms Foundation All-American.

== Professional playing career ==
Hoffman was drafted by the Toronto Huskies in the 1947 BAA draft, but never played for the team as it folded before the season began. He instead signed with the Baltimore Bullets, and averaged 10.5 points per game in his rookie season and was named NBA Rookie of the Year—a designation not sanctioned by the NBA for the 1947–48 season. The Bullets went on to win the 1948 BAA Finals and were crowned BAA champions. Hoffman wanted his salary raised following his successful debut season, but the team refused, so Hoffman left to return to Indiana and became a salesman at Montgomery Ward. Hoffman re-signed with the team for the 1949–50 season.

After playing for five seasons with the Bullets, the team disbanded in November 1954, fourteen games into the 1954–55 season. Hoffman was selected by the New York Knicks in the dispersal draft. He only played for the Knicks for less than two months before being sold to the Philadelphia Warriors. Hoffman retired from playing basketball after the season. He averaged 10.2 points, 2.9 assists and 5.1 rebounds over his career.

== Coaching career ==
From 1956 to 1959, he was head baseball coach at Purdue, replacing Hank Stram; his career totals were 52–49–2 (.505) all games and 18–30–1 (.367) in Big Ten Conference games. He was replaced as the head baseball coach by former Boilermaker star Joe Sexson. He also worked as an assistant for the basketball team under head coach Ray Eddy.

== Later years ==
He served as general manager for the Baltimore Bullets (not related to the original version of that same team) from June 1963 through May 1965; the Bullets recorded an overall record of 68–92 (.425) and reached the NBA Western Division Finals in the 1964–65 season.

In 1977, he was inducted into the Indiana Basketball Hall of Fame. In 1993, at age 68, he was named to the named to the Indiana All-Stars, for the 1942–43 season. The All-Stars, an all High School Senior team, are named at the conclusion of the school year; the team originated in 1939. However, World War II, kept a team from being named and staging the annual 2-game series with the State of Kentucky. The Indianapolis Star sponsored the team for decades and the Lions Club was the largest recipient of charitable donations from the series.

He died of a brain tumor at age 73 in 1998.

== BAA/NBA career statistics ==
Legend
GP	Games played	GS	Games started	MPG	Minutes per game
FG%	Field goal percentage	3P%	3-point field goal percentage	FT%	Free throw percentage
RPG	Rebounds per game	APG	Assists per game	SPG	Steals per game
BPG	Blocks per game	PPG	Points per game	**Bold**	Career high
†	Won an NBA championship

=== Regular season ===
Year	Team	GP	MPG	FG%	FT%	RPG	APG	PPG
1947–48†	Baltimore	37	–	.348	.662	–	0.6	10.5
1949–50	Baltimore	60	–	.341	.665	–	2.7	**14.4**
1950–51	Baltimore	41	–	.318	.673	4.9	2.7	8.8
1952–53	Baltimore	69	28.3	**.366**	.655	4.6	3.4	10.2
1953–54	Baltimore	**72**	**34.8**	.332	.716	**6.8**	**4.0**	10.0
1954–55	New York	18	14.5	.269	.548	2.2	1.4	3.3
1954–55	Philadelphia	20	20.1	.318	**.758**	4.2	3.5	6.8
Career		317	28.7	.340	.676	5.1	2.9	10.2

=== Playoffs ===
Year	Team	GP	MPG	FG%	FT%	RPG	APG	PPG
1948†	Baltimore	**11**	–	**.312**	**.661**	–	0.6	**11.7**
1953	Baltimore	2	**40.5**	.179	.583	**3.5**	**5.5**	8.5
Career		13	40.5	.290	.649	3.5	1.4	11.2
