= Elmer Gainer =

American basketball player (1918–1970)

Personal information
- Born: November 22, 1918 Chicago, Illinois, U.S.
- Died: September 29, 1970 (aged 51) Des Plaines, Illinois, U.S.
- Listed height: 6 ft 6 in (1.98 m)
- Listed weight: 195 lb (88 kg)

Career information
- College: DePaul (1938–1941)
- BAA draft: 1947: 8th round, 70th overall pick
- Drafted by: Baltimore Bullets
- Playing career: 1941–1950
- Position: Forward / center
- Number: 30, 14

Career history
- 1941–1942: Fort Wayne Zollner Pistons
- 1943–1944: Sheboygan Red Skins
- 1944–1946: Chicago American Gears
- 1946–1947: Anderson Chiefs/Duffey Packers
- 1947: Baltimore Bullets
- 1947–1948: Seattle Athletics
- 1948: Bellingham Fricrests
- 1948–1949: Denver Nuggets
- 1950: Waterloo Hawks

Career highlights
- Second-team All-American – MSG (1941)
- Stats at NBA.com
- Stats at Basketball Reference

Elmer R. Gainer (November 22, 1918 – September 29, 1970) was an American professional basketball player. Gainer played college basketball for the DePaul Blue Demons, and was selected in the 1947 BAA draft by the Baltimore Bullets. He played for the Bullets and Waterloo Hawks in the National Basketball Association (NBA). He had previously played in the National Basketball League with several teams.

== BAA/NBA career statistics ==
Legend
GP	Games played	APG	Assists per game
FG%	Field-goal percentage	PPG	Points per game
FT%	Free-throw percentage	**Bold**	Career high

=== Regular season ===
Year	Team	GP	FG%	FT%	APG	PPG
1947–48	Baltimore	5	.111	.500	**0.6**	1.0
1949–50	Waterloo	**15**	**.257**	**.750**	0.5	**1.6**
Career		20	.227	.643	0.5	1.5
