= Red Klotz =

American basketball player

Personal information
- Born: October 21, 1921 Philadelphia, Pennsylvania, U.S.
- Died: July 12, 2014 (aged 93) Margate City, New Jersey, U.S.
- Listed height: 5 ft 7 in (1.70 m)
- Listed weight: 150 lb (68 kg)

Career information
- High school: South Philadelphia (Philadelphia, Pennsylvania)
- College: Villanova (1940–1942)
- Playing career: 1942–1989
- Position: Point guard
- Number: 20

Career history
- 1942–1947: Philadelphia Sphas
- 1947–1948: Baltimore Bullets
- 1953–1989: Washington Generals

Career highlights
- BAA champion (1948); 2x ABL champions (1943, 1945)
- Stats at NBA.com
- Stats at Basketball Reference

Louis Herman "Red" Klotz (October 21, 1921 – July 12, 2014) was an American professional basketball player. He was a National Basketball Association (NBA) point guard with the original Baltimore Bullets, and he was best known for forming the teams that play against and tour with the Harlem Globetrotters: the Washington Generals and the New York Nationals. He was the oldest-living NBA champion at the time of his death.

Over Klotz's professional basketball career, he coached or played in over 14,000 games during eight decades and in over 100 countries.

== Early life ==
Klotz was born in Philadelphia, Pennsylvania, into a Jewish family. He began playing basketball at age 12. He attended South Philadelphia High School where he led the school team to city basketball championships in 1939 and 1940, both times earning Philadelphia Player of the Year honors.

He attended Villanova University on an athletic scholarship, playing on the undefeated freshman basketball team. He left college for World War II, serving stateside.

== Career ==
Klotz "played for a number of teams in those early and turbulent days of professional basketball", according to Joe Posnanski of Sports Illustrated. Klotz played with the South Philadelphia Hebrew Association (the Philadelphia Sphas) of the American Basketball League (ABL) as a point guard in the 1940s. In an exhibition game, the Sphas defeated the Harlem Globetrotters, Klotz's first game against them. He played with the Sphas until 1947.

Klotz played during the 1948 season on the Baltimore Bullets team, the year they won the Basketball Association of America championship. He played in 11 games, scoring 15 points. He also played in six playoff games, scoring six points.

At 5 feet 7 inches (1.70 m), he is tied as the fifth-shortest person to play in an NBA game, and the shortest to play on a championship team.

=== Washington Generals ===
Klotz played for the Philadelphia Sphas of the ABL until 1947; the team had beaten the Harlem Globetrotters on more than one occasion. He later coached and managed the Sphas. In 1953, after playing on several all-star teams against the Trotters during their first international tours, Klotz was approached by Globetrotters owner Abe Saperstein about having his team tour with the Globetrotters and play them on a regular basis. Klotz named his new enterprise the Washington Generals, in honor of Dwight D. Eisenhower. From 1953 until 1995, the Generals played exhibitions against the Globetrotters, winning only two games and only one recognized by the Trotters, the last in 1971, and losing more than 14,000.

Klotz played with the team as a point guard until the age of 68. At 50 years old, he made the game-winning shot for the New Jersey Reds with three seconds left in their final win. "The crowd wanted to kill me," he said. In 1995 Klotz "disbanded" the Generals and formed the New York Nationals to take their place, to erase their record and "change their luck". The team remained the Nationals until 2007, when they reverted to the "Generals" name. The Generals remained a separate organization from the Globetrotters until 2017, three years after the passing of Klotz. Klotz claimed the team still tried to win every game.

== Achievements ==
Klotz was inducted into the Philadelphia Jewish Sports Hall of Fame in 2001. He became the first non-Globetrotter to receive the Globetrotters' "Legend" award on March 10, 2007. Red has stated he has lost over 13,000 games in his coaching career.

In 2009 the Philadelphia Sportswriter's Association presented Klotz with the "Living Legend" award, previously given to such Philadelphia notables as Robin Roberts, Chuck Bednarik, Harry Kalas and Wilt Chamberlain.

The Globetrotters inducted Klotz into their Legends Ring, the team's version of a hall of fame, in 2007. He remains the first non-Trotter so honored. In 2011, the Trotters and Generals retired Klotz's number 3 jersey and raised a banner honoring him to the rafters at the Wells Fargo Center in Philadelphia.

Klotz's biography, The Legend of Red Klotz: How Basketball's Loss Leader Won Over the World, 14,000 Times, was published in November 2013.

== Personal life ==
Klotz was married. He attributed much of his success to his wife, Gloria.

He died at age 93 in Margate City, New Jersey, where he had long kept his office.

== BAA career statistics ==
Legend
GP	Games played	GS	Games started	MPG	Minutes per game
FG%	Field goal percentage	3P%	3-point field goal percentage	FT%	Free throw percentage
RPG	Rebounds per game	APG	Assists per game	SPG	Steals per game
BPG	Blocks per game	PPG	Points per game	**Bold**	Career high
†	Won an NBA championship

=== Regular season ===
Year	Team	GP	FG%	FT%	APG	PPG
1947–48†	Baltimore	11	.226	.333	.6	1.4
Career		11	.226	.333	.6	1.4

=== Playoffs ===
Year	Team	GP	FG%	FT%	APG	PPG
1948†	Baltimore	6	.222	.667	.2	1.0
Career		6	.222	.667	.2	1.0

== See also ==
- List of select Jewish basketball players
- List of shortest players in National Basketball Association history
