= Kleggie Hermsen =

American basketball player

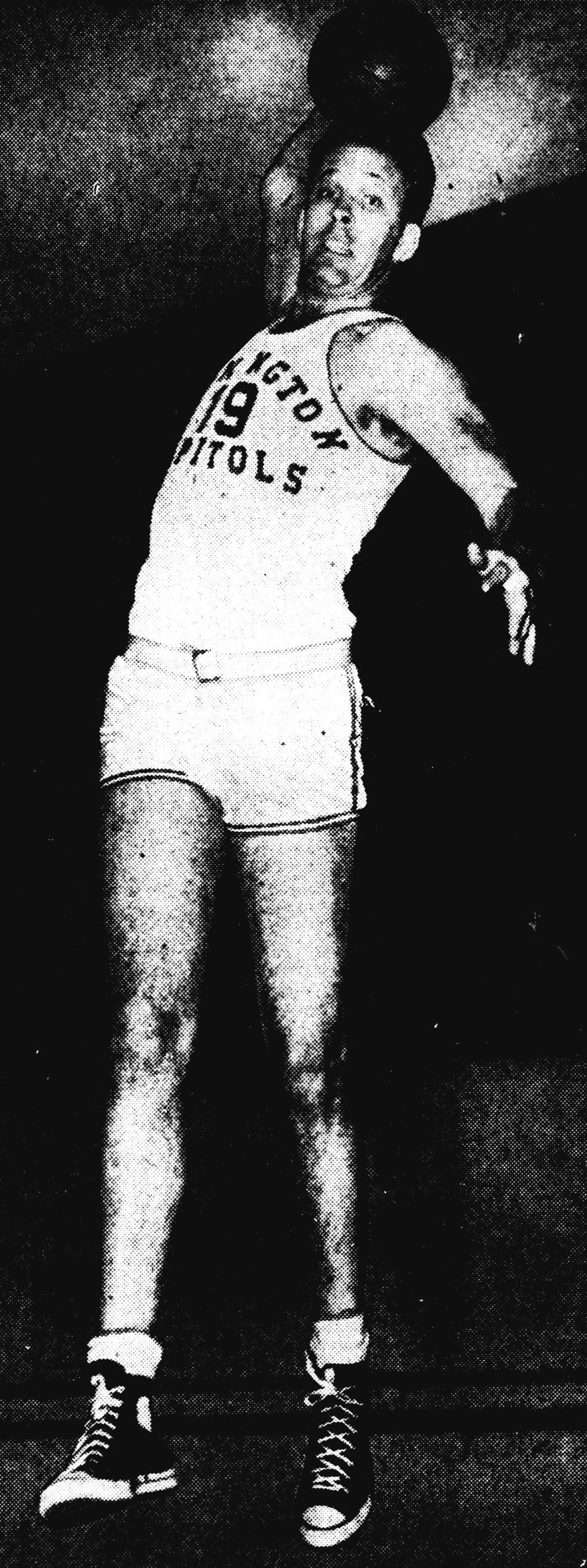
- Hermsen, circa 1949

Personal information
- Born: March 12, 1923 Hill City, Minnesota, U.S.
- Died: March 2, 1994 (aged 70)
- Listed height: 6 ft 9 in (2.06 m)
- Listed weight: 225 lb (102 kg)

Career information
- High school: Vocational (Minneapolis, Minnesota)
- College: Minnesota (1944–1945)
- Playing career: 1943–1953
- Position: Center / forward
- Number: 11, 16, 29, 13, 10

Career history
- 1943–1944, 1945–1946: Sheboygan Red Skins
- 1946: Cleveland Rebels
- 1946–1947: Toronto Huskies
- 1947–1948: Baltimore Bullets
- 1948–1949: Washington Capitols
- 1949–1950: Chicago Stags
- 1950–1951: Tri-Cities Blackhawks
- 1951–1952: Boston Celtics
- 1952: Indianapolis Olympians

Career highlights
- BAA champion (1948)

Career BAA/NBA statistics
- Points: 2,669
- Rebounds: 467
- Assists: 366
- Stats at NBA.com
- Stats at Basketball Reference

Clarence Henry "Kleggie" Hermsen (March 12, 1923 – March 2, 1994) was an American professional basketball player.

== Career ==
A 6-foot-9 center from the University of Minnesota, Hermsen began his professional career with the Sheboygan Red Skins of the National Basketball League in 1943–44 and 1945–46. He scored 11 points in 12 games during his rookie campaign, but played a greater role in his second season, scoring 55 points in 21 games. Both Red Skins teams advanced to the NBL championship series — losses to the Fort Wayne Zollner Pistons and Rochester Royals.

Hermsen then played six seasons (1946–1951; 1952–1953) in the Basketball Association of America and National Basketball Association as a member of the Cleveland Rebels, Toronto Huskies, Baltimore Bullets, Washington Capitols, Chicago Stags, Tri-Cities Blackhawks, Boston Celtics, and Indianapolis Olympians. He averaged 9.3 points per game and 5.8 rebounds per game in his BAA/NBA career and won a league championship with the Bullets in 1948.

== BAA/NBA career statistics ==
Legend
GP	Games played	GS	Games started	MPG	Minutes per game
FG%	Field goal percentage	3P%	3-point field goal percentage	FT%	Free throw percentage
RPG	Rebounds per game	APG	Assists per game	SPG	Steals per game
BPG	Blocks per game	PPG	Points per game	**Bold**	Career high
†	Won an NBA championship

=== Regular season ===
Year	Team	GP	MPG	FG%	FT%	RPG	APG	PPG
1946–47	Cleveland	11	–	.269	.467	–	.9	3.9
1946–47	Toronto	21	–	.291	.660	–	.7	**12.1**
1947–48†	Baltimore	48	–	.277	.665	–	1.0	12.0
1948–49	Washington	60	–	.312	**.682**	–	**1.7**	11.8
1949–50	Chicago	67	–	**.319**	.619	–	1.5	8.1
1950–51	Tri-Cities/Boston	**71**	–	.293	.654	**6.3**	1.3	7.5
1952–53	Boston	4	5.5	.000	.500	1.8	.0	.3
1952–53	Indianapolis	6	**6.7**	.182	.667	2.0	.7	1.7
Career		288	6.2	.297	.654	5.8	1.3	9.3

=== Playoffs ===
Year	Team	GP	MPG	FG%	FT%	RPG	APG	PPG
1948†	Baltimore	**11**	–	.252	.714	–	1.1	11.0
1949	Washington	**11**	–	.268	.663	–	1.1	**12.3**
1950	Chicago	2	–	**.292**	**.800**	–	**2.5**	9.0
1951	Boston	2	–	.167	.000	**1.5**	.0	1.0
Career		26	–	.261	.689	1.5	1.1	10.6
