= Herm Fuetsch =

American basketball player (1918–2010)

Personal information
- Born: July 6, 1918 San Francisco, California, U.S.
- Died: September 29, 2010 (aged 92) Novato, California, U.S.
- Listed height: 6 ft 0 in (1.83 m)
- Listed weight: 170 lb (77 kg)

Career information
- High school: Polytechnic (San Francisco, California)
- Playing career: 1945–1948
- Position: Guard
- Number: 23

Career history
- 1945–1946: Cleveland Allmen Transfers
- 1946–1948: Baltimore Bullets

Career highlights
- BAA champion (1948)
- Stats at NBA.com
- Stats at Basketball Reference

Herman Joseph Fuetsch (July 6, 1918 – September 29, 2010) was an American professional basketball player.

A 6'0" guard, Fuetsch was a member of the 1947–48 Baltimore Bullets team that won the 1948 Basketball Association of America championship. He averaged 2.6 points per game in his BAA career.

Fuetsch was born to parents who immigrated from Austria. He attended San Francisco Polytechnic High School in San Francisco, California. Fuetsch served in the United States Army during World War II and was stationed at Selfridge Air National Guard Base. He was the first player from the San Francisco Bay Area to sign a professional basketball contract.

== BAA career statistics ==
Legend
| GP | Games played | GS | Games started | MPG | Minutes per game |
| FG% | Field goal percentage | 3P% | 3-point field goal percentage | FT% | Free throw percentage |
| RPG | Rebounds per game | APG | Assists per game | SPG | Steals per game |
| BPG | Blocks per game | PPG | Points per game | **Bold** | Career high |
| † | Won an NBA championship |

=== Regular season ===
| Year | Team | GP | FG% | FT% | APG | PPG |
|---|---|---|---|---|---|---|
| 1947–48† | Baltimore | 42 | .300 | .625 | .4 | 2.6 |
| Career | | 42 | .300 | .625 | .4 | 2.6 |

=== Playoffs ===
| Year | Team | GP | FG% | FT% | APG | PPG |
|---|---|---|---|---|---|---|
| 1948† | Baltimore | 9 | .375 | .750 | .0 | 1.3 |
| Career | | 9 | .375 | .750 | .0 | 1.3 |
