= Bob Bolyard =

American basketball player

Personal information
- Born: December 4, 1920 Fort Wayne, Indiana
- Died: May 21, 2009 (aged 88) Fort Wayne, Indiana
- Listed height: 6 ft 0 in (1.83 m)
- Listed weight: 182 lb (83 kg)

Career information
- High school: South Side (Fort Wayne, Indiana)
- College: Toledo (1940–1943)
- Position: Guard / forward

Career history
- 1945–1947: Anderson Chiefs/Duffey Packers
- 1947–1949: Sheboygan Red Skins
- 1949–1950: Fort Wayne Becks
- 1949–1951: Washington Generals
- Stats at Basketball Reference

Robert W. Bolyard (December 4, 1920 – May 21, 2009) was an American professional basketball player. He played for the Anderson Duffey Packers and Sheboygan Red Skins in the National Basketball League and averaged 4.3 points per game.
