= 1948 BAA Finals =

1948 basketball championship series

Team	Coach	Wins
Baltimore Bullets	Buddy Jeannette	4
Philadelphia Warriors	Eddie Gottlieb	2
- Dates: April 10–21
- Hall of Famers: Bullets: Buddy Jeannette (1994); Warriors: Joe Fulks (1978); Coaches: Eddie Gottlieb (1972)
- Eastern finals: Warriors defeated Bombers 4–3 (Eastern and Western champions)
- Western finals: Bullets defeated Stags 2–0 (Runners-up bracket)

The 1948 BAA Finals was the championship round of the Basketball Association of America's 1947–48 season. The defending 1947 BAA champions Philadelphia Warriors of the Eastern Division faced the Baltimore Bullets of the Western Division, with Philadelphia having home court advantage. The Bullets won the series 4–2. This was the first professional sports championship ever won by a Baltimore-based team.

Baltimore was not the Western Division champion but advanced to the championship round by winning a four-team playoff among the Eastern and Western Division runners-up. Meanwhile, the Eastern and Western Division champions, Philadelphia Warriors and St. Louis Bombers, played one long series to determine the other finalist, a best-of-seven series that Philadelphia won 4–3. In the runners-up bracket, Baltimore and Chicago from the West had first eliminated New York and Boston from the East, then faced each other in a best-of-three series. The format was used only twice, in 1947 and 1948, and generated two champions from the runners-up bracket.

The six games of the final series were played in twelve days, with at least one day off except prior to the decisive game. Division champions Philadelphia and St. Louis had played the seven games of their semifinal series in fifteen days, March 23 to April 6, with at least one day off before every game. The entire playoff tournament extended 30 days.

As of 2023, this is the only BAA/NBA Finals which a now-defunct team won (as opposed to teams that changed names and/or moved to other cities in later years).

== Series summary ==
Game	Date	Home team	Result	Road team
Game 1	April 10	Philadelphia Warriors	71–60 (1–0)	Baltimore Bullets
Game 2	April 13	Philadelphia Warriors	63–66 (1–1)	Baltimore Bullets
Game 3	April 15	Baltimore Bullets	72–70 (2–1)	Philadelphia Warriors
Game 4	April 17	Baltimore Bullets	78–75 (3–1)	Philadelphia Warriors
Game 5	April 20	Philadelphia Warriors	91–82 (2–3)	Baltimore Bullets
Game 6	April 21	Baltimore Bullets	88–73 (4–2)	Philadelphia Warriors

Bullets win series 4–2

== Team rosters ==
=== Baltimore Bullets ===
1947–48 Baltimore Bullets (original) roster
Players

Pos.	No.	Player	Height	Weight	DOB	From
G	23	Herm Fuetsch	6 ft 0 in (1.83 m)	170 lb (77 kg)	1918-07-06	Polytechnic HS (CA)
F/C	29	Kleggie Hermsen	6 ft 9 in (2.06 m)	225 lb (102 kg)	1923-03-12	Minnesota
G/F	32	Paul Hoffman	6 ft 2 in (1.88 m)	195 lb (88 kg)	1925-04-12	Purdue
G	26	Buddy Jeannette	5 ft 11 in (1.80 m)	175 lb (79 kg)	1917-09-15	Washington & Jefferson
G	20	Red Klotz	5 ft 7 in (1.70 m)	150 lb (68 kg)	1921-10-21	Villanova
F/C	35	Grady Lewis	6 ft 7 in (2.01 m)	215 lb (98 kg)	1917-03-25	Oklahoma
G/F	31	Carl Meinhold	6 ft 2 in (1.88 m)	185 lb (84 kg)	1926-03-29	LIU Brooklyn
G/F	27	Chick Reiser	5 ft 11 in (1.80 m)	165 lb (75 kg)	1914-12-17	NYU
G/F	21	Dick Schulz	6 ft 2 in (1.88 m)	192 lb (87 kg)	1917-01-03	Wisconsin
F/C	33	Connie Simmons	6 ft 8 in (2.03 m)	222 lb (101 kg)	1925-03-15	Flushing HS (NY)

Coaches
Head coach

Buddy Jeannette

Legend
- (DP) Unsigned draft pick
- (FA) Free agent
- (S) Suspended
- Injured

Roster

=== Philadelphia Warriors ===
1947–48 Philadelphia Warriors roster
Players

Pos.	No.	Player	Height	Weight	DOB	From
F/C	15	Hank Beenders	6 ft 6 in (1.98 m)	185 lb (84 kg)	1916-06-02	LIU Brooklyn
F	14	Stan Brown	6 ft 3 in (1.91 m)	200 lb (91 kg)	1929-06-27	South Philadelphia HS (PA)
G	7	Chink Crossin	6 ft 1 in (1.85 m)	165 lb (75 kg)	1924-07-04	Penn
F	12	Howie Dallmar	6 ft 4 in (1.93 m)	200 lb (91 kg)	1922-05-24	Stanford
SG	6	Jerry Fleishman	6 ft 2 in (1.88 m)	190 lb (86 kg)	1922-02-14	NYU
PF	10	Joe Fulks	6 ft 5 in (1.96 m)	190 lb (86 kg)	1921-10-26	Murray State
C	20	Chick Halbert	6 ft 9 in (2.06 m)	225 lb (102 kg)	1919-02-27	West Texas A&M
C	18	Art Hillhouse	6 ft 7 in (2.01 m)	220 lb (100 kg)	1916-06-12	LIU Brooklyn
G/F	9	Ralph Kaplowitz	6 ft 2 in (1.88 m)	170 lb (77 kg)	1919-05-18	NYU
G	5	Angelo Musi	5 ft 9 in (1.75 m)	145 lb (66 kg)	1918-07-25	Temple
F	7	Bob O'Brien	6 ft 4 in (1.93 m)	190 lb (86 kg)	1927-01-26	Pepperdine
F/C	19	Jack Rocker	6 ft 5 in (1.96 m)	185 lb (84 kg)	1922-08-12	California
PG	8	George Senesky	6 ft 2 in (1.88 m)	179 lb (81 kg)	1922-04-04	Saint Joseph's

Coaches
Head coach

Edward Gottlieb

Legend
- (DP) Unsigned draft pick
- (FA) Free agent
- (S) Suspended
- Injured

Roster
