= Jānis Porziņģis =

Latvian basketball player (born 1982)

Personal information
- Born: 13 July 1982 (age 44) Liepāja, Latvia
- Listed height: 6 ft 7.5 in (2.02 m)
- Listed weight: 225 lb (102 kg)

Career information
- Playing career: 2000–2013
- Position: Small forward

Career history
- 2000–2001: Ventspils
- 2001–2002: Liepājas Lauvas
- 2002–2003: Gulbenes Buki
- 2003–2004: Neptūnas Klaipėda
- 2004: Kapfenberg Bulls
- 2004–2005: Norrköping Dolphins
- 2005: Scarlet Vilvoorde
- 2005–2006: Soproni Sordogok
- 2006–2007: Basket Livorno
- 2007–2008: Pistoia Basket 2000
- 2008: New Basket Brindisi
- 2008–2009: Liepājas Lauvas
- 2009–2010: Roseto Sharks
- 2010–2011: Pistoia Basket 2000
- 2011–2012: Liepājas Lauvas
- 2012: Valmiera
- 2012: Guerino Vanoli Basket
- 2012: Valmiera
- 2012–2013: Palencia Baloncesto
- 2013: Šibenik

Jānis Porziņģis (Latvian pronunciation: [ˈjaːnis puɔr.ziɲ.ɟis]; born 13 July 1982) is a Latvian former professional basketball player. At a height of 2.02 m (6 ft 7 1/2 in), he played at the small forward position. He is the older brother of Golden State Warriors forward Kristaps Porziņģis.

== Professional playing career ==
Porziņģis played for 15 different teams in multiple European national domestic leagues over a 14-year career. He officially retired from playing professional basketball in 2015 after having last played in 2013.

== National team career ==
Porziņģis also made a few appearances with the senior Latvian national team.

== Post-playing career ==
After he retired from playing professional basketball, Porziņģis became an agent for his younger brother, Kristaps Porziņģis, who is himself a professional basketball player for the Golden State Warriors of the National Basketball Association (NBA).
