= List of tallest players in NBA history =

This is a list of the tallest players in National Basketball Association history. It is currently topped by the 7-foot-7-inch (2.31 m) Romanian Gheorghe Mureșan, taken by the Washington Bullets as the number 30 overall pick in the 1993 NBA draft.

As of the 2026–27 NBA season, thirty-one players have been listed at 7-foot-3-inch (2.21 m) or taller. Five are active as of the 2026–27 season: Tacko Fall of the Philadelphia 76ers, Victor Wembanyama of the San Antonio Spurs, Zach Edey of the Memphis Grizzlies, Aday Mara of the Oklahoma City Thunder, and Rocco Zikarsky of the Minnesota Timberwolves. The tallest player inducted into the Naismith Memorial Basketball Hall of Fame is 7-foot-6-inch (2.29 m) Yao Ming. Yao, Ralph Sampson and Arvydas Sabonis are the only players 7-foot-3-inch (2.21 m) or taller elected to the Hall of Fame.

Yasutaka Okayama, a 7-foot-8-inch (2.34 m) Japanese basketball player picked 171st overall in the seventh round of the 1981 NBA draft by the Golden State Warriors, is the tallest player ever to be drafted to the NBA. However, he never played in the NBA.

== List ==
Statistics accurate as of the 2025–26 NBA season.

| ^ | | Active NBA player | | | |
| * | | Inducted into the Naismith Memorial Basketball Hall of Fame | | | |
| GP | Games played | Pts | Points | PPG | Points per game |
| FG% | Field goal percentage | FT% | Free throw percentage | Reb | Rebounds |
| RPG | Rebounds per game | Blk | Blocks | BPG | Blocks per game |

| Height | Weight | Player | Nat. | Teams | GP | Pts | PPG | FG% | FT% | Reb | RPG | Blk | BPG | Notes |
|---|---|---|---|---|---|---|---|---|---|---|---|---|---|---|
| 7 ft 7 in (2.31 m) | 303 lb (137 kg) | Gheorghe Mureșan | (Romania) (United States) | Washington Bullets (1993–1998); New Jersey Nets (1998–2000) | 307 | 3,020 | 9.8 | .573 | .644 | 1,957 | 6.4 | 455 | 1.5 | Won 1996 NBA Most Improved Player Award. |
| 7 ft 7 in (2.31 m) (Note: Official NBA sources variously list Bol at 7 ft 6 in (2.29 m) or 7 ft 7 in (2.31 m).) | 200 lb (91 kg) | Manute Bol | (Sudan) | Washington Bullets (1985–1988, 1994); Golden State Warriors (1988–1990, 1994); Philadelphia 76ers (1990–1993, 1994); Miami Heat (1993–1994) | 625 | 1,599 | 2.6 | .407 | .561 | 2,647 | 4.2 | 2,086 | 3.3 | Played alongside the shortest player in NBA history, Muggsy Bogues, during the 1987–88 season for the Washington Bullets; their difference in height was 28 inches (71 cm). |
| 7 ft 6 in (2.29 m) | 275 lb (125 kg) | Shawn Bradley | (United States) (Germany) | Philadelphia 76ers (1993–1995); New Jersey Nets (1995–1997); Dallas Mavericks (1997–2005) | 832 | 6,752 | 8.1 | .457 | .716 | 5,268 | 6.3 | 2,119 | 2.5 | Born to American parents in the former West Germany. |
| 7 ft 6 in (2.29 m) | 311 lb (141 kg) | Tacko Fall^ | (Senegal) | Boston Celtics (2019–2021); Cleveland Cavaliers (2021–2022) | 37 | 82 | 2.2 | .673 | .320 | 90 | 2.4 | 30 | 0.8 | Currently the tallest active player in the NBA. |
| 7 ft 6 in (2.29 m) | 310 lb (141 kg) | Yao Ming* | (China) | Houston Rockets (2002–2011) | 481 | 9,196 | 19.1 | .525 | .832 | 4,467 | 9.3 | 912 | 1.9 | Drafted first overall in the 2002 NBA draft. Tallest player to play in at least one All-Star Game. Also tallest player inducted into the Hall of Fame. |
| 7 ft 5 in (2.26 m) | 360 lb (163 kg) | Sim Bhullar | (Canada) | Sacramento Kings (2015) | 3 | 2 | 0.7 | .500 | — | 1 | 0.3 | 1 | 0.3 | First NBA player of Indian descent. Played 16 seconds in his debut on April 7, 2015. |
| 7 ft 5 in (2.26 m) | 217 lb (98 kg) | Chuck Nevitt | (United States) | Houston Rockets (1982–1983, 1988–1990); Los Angeles Lakers (1984–1985); Detroit Pistons (1985–1988); Chicago Bulls (1991); San Antonio Spurs (1993) | 155 | 251 | 1.6 | .438 | .589 | 239 | 1.5 | 111 | 0.7 | Tallest player to win an NBA Championship. |
| 7 ft 5 in (2.26 m) | 260 lb (118 kg) | Pavel Podkolzin | (Russia) | Dallas Mavericks (2004–2006) | 6 | 4 | 0.7 | .000 | .500 | 9 | 1.5 | 1 | 0.1 | |
| 7 ft 5 in (2.26 m) | 275 lb (125 kg) | Slavko Vraneš | (Montenegro) | Portland Trail Blazers (2004) | 1 | 0 | 0.0 | .000 | — | 0 | 0.0 | 0 | 0.0 | Played in one game, on January 8, 2004 against the Minnesota Timberwolves. Played 3 minutes, with one shot attempt from the field (missed) and one personal foul. Vraneš was officially listed as 7'5" while playing in the NBA, and has since grown taller (7'6" or 2.30 m), according to most sources. |
| 7 ft 4 in (2.24 m) | 275 lb (125 kg) | Mark Eaton | (United States) | Utah Jazz (1982–1993) | 875 | 5,216 | 6.0 | .458 | .649 | 6,939 | 10.8 | 3,064 | 3.5 | He set records for most blocked shots per game in a single season (5.56 bpg in 1984–85) and for an entire career (3.50 bpg)—both marks still stand today. One-time NBA All-Star. |
| 7 ft 4 in (2.24 m) | 325 lb (147 kg) | Priest Lauderdale | (United States) (Bulgaria) | Atlanta Hawks (1996–1997); Denver Nuggets (1997–1998) | 74 | 255 | 3.4 | .472 | .554 | 143 | 1.9 | 26 | 0.4 | |
| 7 ft 4 in (2.24 m) | 290 lb (132 kg) | Boban Marjanović | (Serbia) | San Antonio Spurs (2015–2016); Detroit Pistons (2016–2018); Los Angeles Clippers (2018–2019); Philadelphia 76ers (2019); Dallas Mavericks (2019–2022); Houston Rockets (2022–2024) | 331 | 1,835 | 5.5 | .578 | .762 | 1,189 | 3.6 | 96 | 0.3 | |
| 7 ft 4 in (2.24 m) | 228 lb (103 kg) | Ralph Sampson* | (United States) | Houston Rockets (1983–1987); Golden State Warriors (1987–1989); Sacramento Kings (1989–1991); Washington Bullets (1991–1992) | 456 | 7,039 | 15.4 | .486 | .661 | 4,011 | 8.8 | 752 | 1.6 | Three-time College national player of the year, #1 pick in the 1983 NBA draft, four-time All-Star, member of the Naismith Memorial Basketball Hall of Fame. |
| 7 ft 4 in (2.24 m) | 265 lb (120 kg) | Rik Smits | (Netherlands) | Indiana Pacers (1988–2000) | 867 | 12,871 | 14.8 | .507 | .773 | 5,277 | 6.1 | 1,111 | 1.3 | One-time NBA All-Star. |
| 7 ft 4 in (2.24 m) | 235 lb (107 kg) | Victor Wembanyama^ | (France) | San Antonio Spurs (2023–present) | 181 | 4,238 | 23.4 | .484 | .817 | 1,997 | 11.0 | 627 | 3.5 | Drafted first overall in the 2023 NBA draft. |
| 7 ft 3 in (2.21 m) | 220 lb (100 kg) | Bol Bol | (South Sudan) | Denver Nuggets (2019–2022); Orlando Magic (2022–2023); Phoenix Suns (2023–2025) | 202 | 1,243 | 6.2 | .545 | .749 | 709 | 3.5 | 153 | 0.8 | Son of joint tallest player in NBA history, Manute Bol. |
| 7 ft 3 in (2.21 m) | 230 lb (104 kg) | Randy Breuer | (United States) | Milwaukee Bucks (1983–1990); Minnesota Timberwolves (1990–1992); Atlanta Hawks (1992–1993); Sacramento Kings (1993) | 681 | 4,599 | 6.8 | .467 | .628 | 2,986 | 4.4 | 750 | 1.1 | |
| 7 ft 3 in (2.21 m) | 212 lb (96 kg) | Keith Closs | (United States) | Los Angeles Clippers (1997–2000) | 130 | 502 | 3.9 | .471 | .606 | 372 | 2.9 | 163 | 1.3 | During his collegiate career, Closs averaged 5.9 blocks per game, which is the NCAA Division I record. |
| 7 ft 3 in (2.21 m) | 305 lb (138 kg) | Zach Edey^ | (Canada) | Memphis Grizzlies (2024–present) | 77 | 760 | 9.9 | .589 | .723 | 670 | 8.7 | 106 | 1.4 | Two-time College national player of the year. |
| 7 ft 3 in (2.21 m) | 305 lb (138 kg) | Ha Seung-jin | (South Korea) | Portland Trail Blazers (2005–2006) | 46 | 70 | 1.5 | .519 | .500 | 67 | 1.5 | 13 | 0.3 | Only Korean player to play in the NBA. |
| 7 ft 3 in (2.21 m) | 235 lb (107 kg) | Swede Halbrook | (United States) | Syracuse Nationals (1960–1962) | 143 | 786 | 5.5 | .347 | .591 | 949 | 6.6 | — | — | |
| 7 ft 3 in (2.21 m) | 260 lb (118 kg) | Žydrūnas Ilgauskas | (Lithuania) | Cleveland Cavaliers (1996–2010); Miami Heat (2010–2011) | 771 | 10,616 | 13.8 | .475 | .780 | 5,904 | 7.7 | 1,269 | 1.6 | Two-time NBA All-Star. |
| 7 ft 3 in (2.21 m) | 255 lb (116 kg) | Aday Mara^ | (Spain) | Oklahoma City Thunder (2026–present) | — | — | — | — | — | — | — | — | — | |
| 7 ft 3 in (2.21 m) | 256 lb (116 kg) | Tibor Pleiß | (Germany) | Utah Jazz (2015–2016) | 12 | 24 | 2.0 | .440 | 1.000 | 15 | 1.3 | 2 | 0.2 | |
| 7 ft 3 in (2.21 m) | 250 lb (113 kg) | Aleksandar Radojević | (Bosnia and Herzegovina) (Montenegro) | Toronto Raptors (1999–2000); Utah Jazz (2004–2005) | 15 | 26 | 1.7 | .308 | .625 | 36 | 2.4 | 3 | 0.2 | |
| 7 ft 3 in (2.21 m) | 275 lb (125 kg) | Peter John Ramos | (Puerto Rico) | Washington Wizards (2004–2005) | 6 | 11 | 1.8 | .500 | .500 | 4 | 0.7 | 1 | 0.2 | |
| 7 ft 3 in (2.21 m) | 292 lb (132 kg) | Arvydas Sabonis* | (Lithuania) | Portland Trail Blazers (1995–2001, 2002–2003) | 470 | 5,629 | 12.0 | .500 | .786 | 3,436 | 7.3 | 494 | 1.1 | Sabonis was originally drafted into the NBA in 1986 (Rd. 1, #24 overall), but was not allowed to play in the NBA for most of his career due to restrictions set by the former Soviet Union. |
| 7 ft 3 in (2.21 m) | 265 lb (120 kg) | Edy Tavares | (Cape Verde) | Atlanta Hawks (2015–2016); Cleveland Cavaliers (2017) | 13 | 33 | 2.5 | .625 | .273 | 32 | 2.5 | 12 | 0.9 | Only Cape Verdean player to play in the NBA. |
| 7 ft 3 in (2.21 m) | 263 lb (119 kg) | Hasheem Thabeet | (Tanzania) | Memphis Grizzlies (2009–2011); Houston Rockets (2011–2012); Portland Trail Blazers (2012); Oklahoma City Thunder (2012–2014) | 224 | 483 | 2.2 | .567 | .578 | 595 | 2.7 | 184 | 0.8 | Only Tanzanian player to play in the NBA. |
| 7 ft 3 in (2.21 m) | 227 lb (103 kg) | Rocco Zikarsky^ | (Australia) | Minnesota Timberwolves (2025–present) | 5 | 14 | 2.8 | .625 | 1.000 | 14 | 2.8 | 5 | 1.0 | |
| 7 ft 3 in (2.21 m) | 273 lb (124 kg) | Serge Zwikker | (Netherlands) | Houston Rockets (1997–1998) | 0 | 0 | 0.0 | .000 | .000 | 0 | 0.0 | 0 | 0 | Zwikker was on the Rockets roster for the entire 1997–98 season, but spent the year on the injured list and did not play in a game before the 1998 NBA lockout. |

== See also ==
- List of tallest people
- List of shortest players in NBA history
- List of NBA regular season records
