= Washington Generals =

Exhibition basketball team

- Leagues: Independent
- Founded: 1952
- Dissolved: 2015, reformed 2017
- History: Also known as: Boston Shamrocks (1971–1972); New Jersey Reds (1971–1976); Baltimore Rockets (1971–1972); Atlantic City Seagulls (1971–1972); New York Nationals (1995–2006); International Elite (2011–2012); Global Select (2011–2012); World All-Stars (2013–2014)
- Arena: Barnstorming team
- Team colors: Green, yellow
- General manager: Kenny Smith
- Head coach: Sam Worthen
- Ownership: Herschend
- Website: Official website

The Washington Generals are an American basketball team who play exhibition games against the Harlem Globetrotters. The team has also played under several aliases in their history as the Globetrotters' perennial opponents.

== Function ==
Old logo of the team

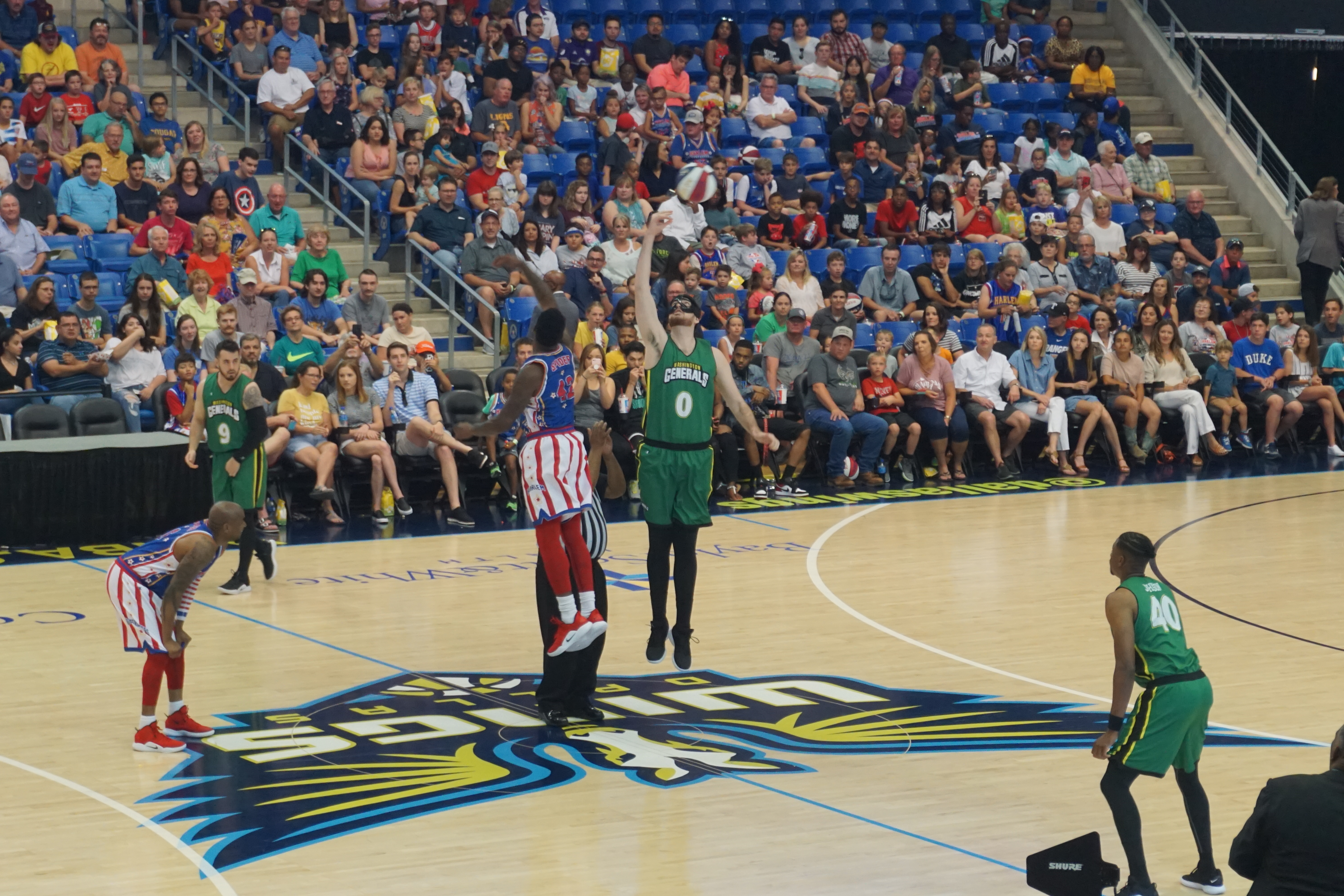
The Generals in action against the Globetrotters in 2019

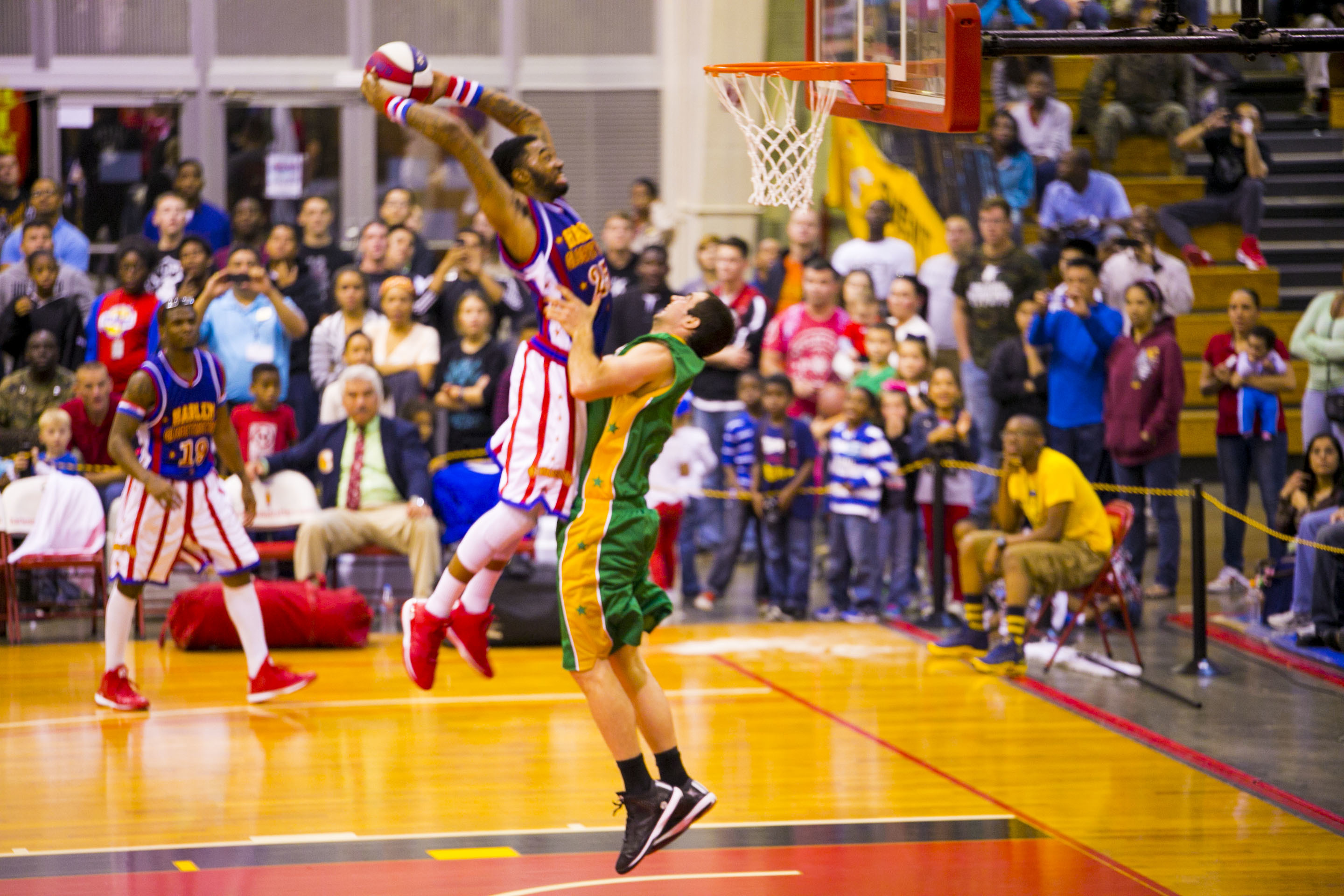
A Globetrotter slam dunks over a Washington Generals player.

The Generals exist primarily as a part of the Harlem Globetrotters' act, effectively being stooges for the Globetrotters. While the Globetrotters play tricks and perform spectacular displays of skill for the crowd, the Generals attempt to play a "normal" game of basketball. The Generals' games involve playing genuine basketball at times, but also not interfering in the Globetrotters' tricks. Almost every game has ended in a resounding win for the Globetrotters. Despite their losses, the Generals' roster consists of competent players. A recurring part of the act is the "guest General", where, for a short period, an invited person (usually a local celebrity) comes on court to play for the Generals. There can exist multiple teams of Generals simultaneously, each following different touring Globetrotters teams.

While the Generals are closely associated with the Globetrotters, they were, for most of their history, an independent franchise owned by their founder, Louis "Red" Klotz, who also played on the Generals. In 2017, they were purchased from the Klotz family by Globetrotters' owners Herschend and officially revived from a two-year hiatus.

== History ==
The Generals were created in 1952 by Louis "Red" Klotz, a former player for the Philadelphia Sphas, a former ABL team that became one of the Globetrotters' exhibition rivals. Globetrotters owner Abe Saperstein had invited Klotz to create a squad to accompany his team on their tours, in part because the Sphas had beaten the Globetrotters on more than one occasion while serving as one of the Globetrotters' exhibition teams. With a nod to Dwight D. Eisenhower, the team was named the Washington Generals.

The Generals remained a continuous presence in the Globetrotters act from then on, but to give the illusion of variety they played under a variety of names and uniforms. During the 1971–72 season, the Generals' name was alternated with the "Boston Shamrocks", "New Jersey Reds", "Baltimore Rockets", and "Atlantic City Seagulls". The team rotated between these identities for a few seasons before going back to the Generals identity full-time. In 1995, Klotz "disbanded" the Generals and formed the "New York Nationals" which again was only a nominal change.

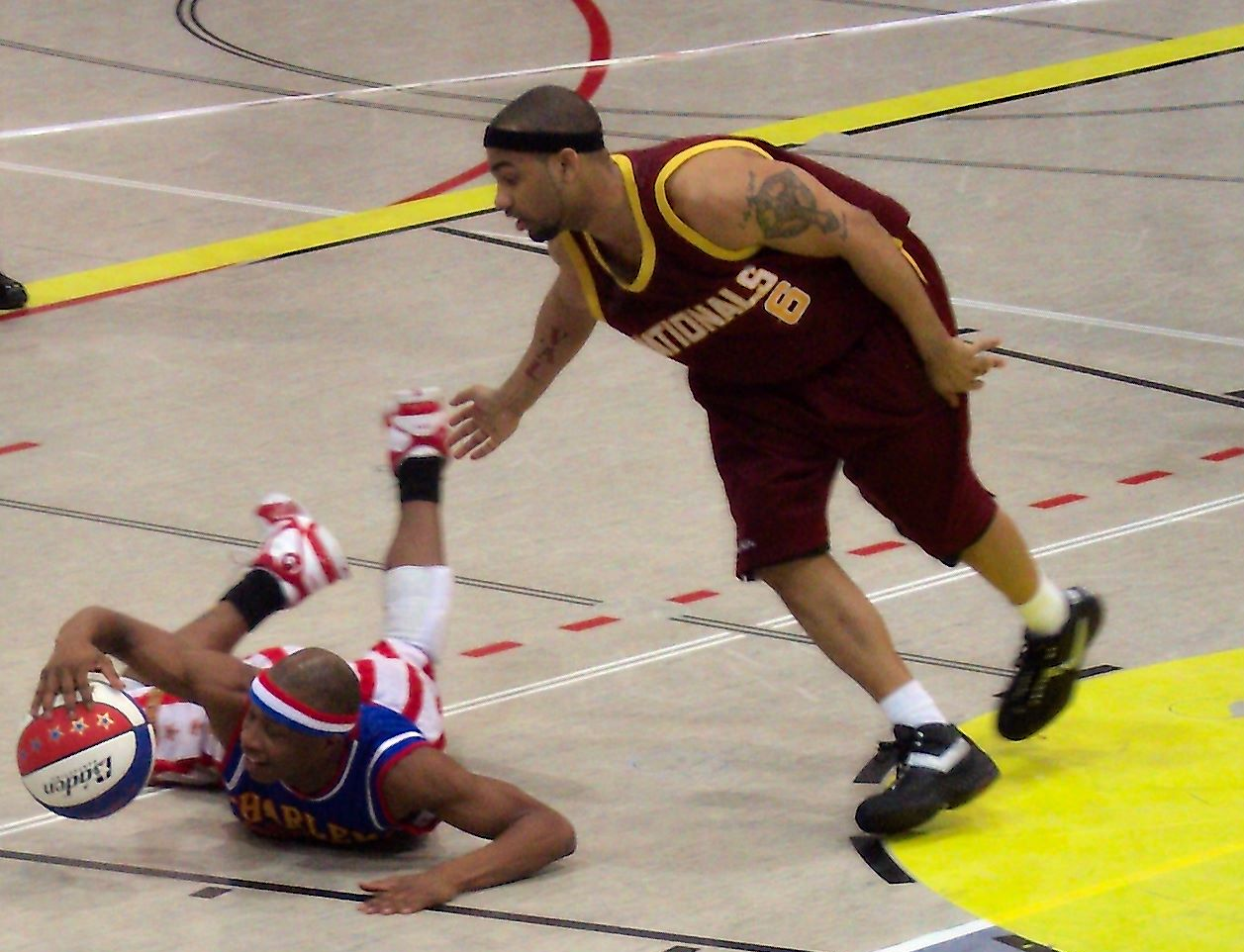
From 1995 to 2007 the team played as the "New York Nationals" in maroon jerseys

John Ferrari, the son-in-law of Klotz, took over as general manager of the team in 1987.

After a 12-year hiatus, the team returned to their Generals identity on October 9, 2007, playing against the Globetrotters at the 369th Harlem Armory. The Globetrotters won 54–50. The monikers of "International Elite" and the "Global Select" were adopted prior to the 2011–12 World Tour. For the 2013–14 Harlem Globetrotters World Tour, the team took on the moniker of the "World All-Stars".

The Generals would occasionally play teams other than the Globetrotters. Among these games, which were competitive, they managed to record victories against the Taiwanese national team and a low-level Red Army team.

In 2015, the Harlem Globetrotters management chose to end contractual relations with the Generals organization, resulting in the Generals ceasing operations. The Generals played their last game against the Globetrotters on August 1, 2015, in Wildwood, New Jersey. Overall, the Generals had lost to the Globetrotters more than 16,000 times in their combined history while winning a mere 3 to 6 games.

From 2015, the Globetrotters' opposition was organized by their own management. In 2017, Herschend Family Entertainment, the owners of the Harlem Globetrotters, bought the Washington Generals from the Klotz family and revived them as an active team with Kenny Smith as general manager and Sam Worthen as coach. The Generals held a tongue-in-cheek "draft" where they selected various unavailable people including LaVar Ball and Conor McGregor. As a reintroduction for the team, they were entered in ESPN's The Basketball Tournament 2017. Despite having a rare opportunity to play serious, competitive basketball, their long losing run continued with a first-round loss.

== Record against Harlem Globetrotters ==
Figures vary as to exactly how often the Generals have beaten their rivals. Some reports say six times, while the team's official website reports having three victories over the Globetrotters, one each in 1954, 1958 and 1971. The 1971 win is the most storied of these, and it is sometimes reported as the team's sole victory.

Playing as the New Jersey Reds, they won 100–99 on January 5, 1971, in Martin, Tennessee, ending their 2,495-game losing streak. Klotz credits the overtime win to a guard named Eddie Mahar, who was team captain. Harlem's captain, Curly Neal, did not play in this game.

While the Globetrotters were entertaining the crowd that day, they lost track of the game and the score. They found themselves down 12 points with two minutes left. Forced to play normal basketball, the Globetrotters rallied but could not recover.

The Reds secured their victory when the 50-year-old Klotz hit the winning basket with seconds left. Then, Meadowlark Lemon missed a shot that would have given the game back to the Globetrotters. The timekeeper tried to stop the clock but could not. When the final buzzer sounded, the crowd was dumbfounded and disappointed. Klotz described the fans' reaction: "They looked at us like we killed Santa Claus."

Some children in the stands cried after the loss. The Reds celebrated by dousing themselves with orange pop instead of champagne. Lemon was furious, saying, "You lost, I didn't lose", but still visited the opposing team’s locker room to congratulate the Reds.

== Generals–Globetrotters transfers ==
Rarely Washington Generals players have been "promoted" to the Globetrotters. Derick "Dizzy" Grant was transferred in 2010, and Jonte "Too Tall" Hall made the transition in 2011.

Paul Sturgess made the opposite transition. The former Globetrotter, after a few seasons playing for other teams, transferred back into the setup as part of the arranged opposition. The 7 ft 7 in (2.31 m) Sturgess adopted the persona of "Cager", a masked adversary who adopts a villainous role.
