= List of Chicago Stags players =

The following is a list of players of the now-defunct Chicago Stags professional basketball team.

- Norm Baker
- Leo Barnhorst
- Mike Bloom
- Joe Bradley
- Jim Browne
- Chet Carlisle
- Don Carlson
- Bill Davis
- Bob Duffy
- Jack Eskridge
- Chuck Gilmur
- Joe Graboski
- Bob Hahn
- Chick Halbert
- Kleggie Hermsen
- Paul Huston
- Tony Jaros
- Johnny Jorgensen
- Whitey Kachan
- Wibs Kautz
- Frank Kudelka
- Carl Meinhold
- Stan Miasek
- Ed Mikan
- Bill Miller
- George Nostrand
- Garland O'Shields
- Doyle Parrack
- Andy Phillip
- Bob Rensberger
- Bill Roberts
- Gene Rock
- Kenny Rollins
- Mickey Rottner
- Kenny Sailors
- Ben Schadler
- Jim Seminoff
- Odie Spears
- Buck Sydnor
- Jack Toomay
- Gene Vance
- Max Zaslofsky
