= 1947 BAA Finals =

1947 basketball championship series

Team	Coach	Wins
Philadelphia Warriors	Eddie Gottlieb	4
Chicago Stags	Harold Olsen	1
- Dates: April 16–22
- Hall of Famers: Warriors: Joe Fulks (1978); Coaches: Harold Olsen (1959); Eddie Gottlieb (1972)
- Eastern finals: Warriors defeated Knickerbockers, 2–0 (Runners-up bracket)
- Western finals: Stags defeated Capitols, 4–2 (Western and Eastern champions)

The 1947 BAA Finals was the championship round of playoffs following the inaugural Basketball Association of America (BAA)'s 1946–47 season. The Philadelphia Warriors of the Eastern Division faced the Chicago Stags of the Western Division for the inaugural championship, with Philadelphia having home court advantage. Hall of Fame inductee Joe Fulks played for the Warriors in the series.

Greater details on the first ever championship series (also known as the BAA Finals; now as the NBA Finals) that was held in the history of the BAA/NBA would be explored in Charley Rosen's book called "The First Tip-Off: The Incredible Story of the Birth of the NBA", with an entire (short) chapter dedicated to the intricate details involved with the BAA Finals (including the explanation for why the Warriors held home court advantage despite the Stags having the better regular season record and why Philadelphia would have held home court advantage for potential Games 6 & 7 there) and behind the scenes business (alongside later interviews with players and personnel that were involved with the two remaining teams that season and potential suspicions of tampering referees throughout both the playoffs and championship series) that occurred during the 1947 BAA Finals.

== Background ==
Philadelphia was not the Eastern Division champion but advanced to the championship round by winning a four-team playoff among the Eastern and Western Division runners-up. Meanwhile, the Eastern and Western Division champions, Washington Capitols and Chicago Stags, played one long series to determine the other finalist, a best-of-seven series that Chicago won 4–2. In the runners-up bracket, Philadelphia and New York from the East had first eliminated St. Louis and Cleveland from the West, then faced each other, all in best-of-three series. The format was repeated in 1948, and generated another champion from the runners-up bracket.

The five games of the final series were played in seven days, with no days off between consecutive games in the same city (twice). Division champions Washington and Chicago had played the six games of their semifinal series from April 2 to 13, although they too took no days off between consecutive games in the same city (twice). In total, the entire playoff tournament lasted a total of 20 days.

This would be the Stags only appearance in the Finals; the franchise would fold three years later. It would be another 44 years before a Chicago club played for a pro basketball championship, when the Chicago Bulls won the 1991 NBA Finals.

== Team rosters ==
=== Philadelphia Warriors ===
1946–47 Philadelphia Warriors roster
Players

Pos.	No.	Player	Height	Weight	DOB	From
F	12	Howie Dallmar	6 ft 4 in (1.93 m)	200 lb (91 kg)	1922-05-24	Stanford
G	6	Jerry Fleishman	6 ft 2 in (1.88 m)	190 lb (86 kg)	1922-02-14	NYU
F	10	Joe Fulks	6 ft 5 in (1.96 m)	190 lb (86 kg)	1921-10-26	Murray State
F	14	Matt Guokas	6 ft 3 in (1.91 m)	195 lb (88 kg)	1915-11-11	Saint Joseph's
C	18	Art Hillhouse	6 ft 7 in (2.01 m)	220 lb (100 kg)	1916-06-12	LIU Brooklyn
G/F	9	Ralph Kaplowitz	6 ft 2 in (1.88 m)	170 lb (77 kg)	1919-05-18	NYU
G	5	Angelo Musi	5 ft 9 in (1.75 m)	145 lb (66 kg)	1918-07-25	Temple
G	15	Petey Rosenberg	5 ft 10 in (1.78 m)	165 lb (75 kg)	1918-04-07	Saint Joseph's
G	7	Jerry Rullo	5 ft 10 in (1.78 m)	165 lb (75 kg)	1923-06-23	Temple
G	8	George Senesky	6 ft 2 in (1.88 m)	179 lb (81 kg)	1922-04-04	Saint Joseph's

Coaches
Head coach
- Eddie Gottlieb

Legend
- (DP) Unsigned draft pick
- (FA) Free agent
- (S) Suspended
- Injured

Roster

=== Chicago Stags ===
1946–47 Chicago Stags roster
Players

Pos.	No.	Player	Height	Weight	DOB	From
F/C	16	Chet Carlisle	6 ft 5 in (1.96 m)	195 lb (88 kg)	1916-11-02	California
G/F	15	Don Carlson	6 ft 0 in (1.83 m)	170 lb (77 kg)	1919-03-22	Minnesota
F	3	Bill Davis	6 ft 3 in (1.91 m)	215 lb (98 kg)	1921-10-03	Notre Dame
F/C	17	Chuck Gilmur	6 ft 4 in (1.93 m)	225 lb (102 kg)	1922-08-13	Washington
C	22	Chick Halbert	6 ft 9 in (2.06 m)	225 lb (102 kg)	1919-02-27	West Texas A&M
G/F	26	Tony Jaros	6 ft 3 in (1.91 m)	185 lb (84 kg)	1920-02-22	Minnesota
G/F	12	Wilbert Kautz	6 ft 0 in (1.83 m)	180 lb (82 kg)	1915-09-07	Loyola Chicago
G/F	8	Doyle Parrack	6 ft 0 in (1.83 m)	165 lb (75 kg)	1921-12-06	Oklahoma State
G	6	Mickey Rottner	5 ft 10 in (1.78 m)	180 lb (82 kg)	1919-03-23	Loyola Chicago
G/F	5	Jim Seminoff	6 ft 2 in (1.88 m)	190 lb (86 kg)	1922-09-01	USC
G	10	Max Zaslofsky	6 ft 2 in (1.88 m)	170 lb (77 kg)	1925-12-07	St. John's

Coaches
Head coach
- Harold Olsen
Assistant(s)
- Philip Brownstein

Legend
- (DP) Unsigned draft pick
- (FA) Free agent
- (S) Suspended
- Injured

Roster

== Series summary ==
Game	Date	Home team	Result	Road team
Game 1	April 16	Philadelphia Warriors	84–71 (1–0)	Chicago Stags
Game 2	April 17	Philadelphia Warriors	85–74 (2–0)	Chicago Stags
Game 3	April 19	Chicago Stags	72–75 (0–3)	Philadelphia Warriors
Game 4	April 20	Chicago Stags	74–73 (1–3)	Philadelphia Warriors
Game 5	April 22	Philadelphia Warriors	83–80 (4–1)	Chicago Stags

Warriors win series 4–1

=== Game 1 ===
April 16

Box score

Chicago Stags 71, Philadelphia Warriors 84
Scoring by quarter: 12–20, 12–10, 22–22, 25–32
Pts: Halbert 19; Asts: Rottner 2	Pts: Fulks 37; Asts: Dallmar 4
Philadelphia leads series, 1–0

Philadelphia Arena, Philadelphia, Pennsylvania
Attendance: 7,918

Around 7,900 people attended Game 1. The Warriors led at halftime 34–20. Joe Fulks then scored 29 points in the second half, including 21 in the fourth quarter. Angelo Musi, a guard out of Temple University, scored 19 points himself for Philadelphia as well. The Stags took an astounding 129 shots, but only knocked down 26 of them, a 20.2 shooting percentage which made it easy for the Warriors to win, 84–71.

=== Game 2 ===
April 17

Box score

Chicago Stags 74, Philadelphia Warriors 85
Scoring by quarter: 17–14, 21–27, 21–22, 15–22
Pts: Carlisle 19; Asts: Gilmur, Halbert, Kautz, Seminoff 1 each	Pts: Dallmar 18; Asts: Kaplowitz 2
Philadelphia leads series, 2–0

Philadelphia Arena, Philadelphia, Pennsylvania
Attendance: 7,604

Fulks was not the scorer he was in Game 1, but he did not have to be, because five other Warrior players scored in double figures, including 18 points from forward Howie Dallmar and 16 from guard Jerry Fleishman. Chicago did take a brief 69–68 lead until Philadelphia center Art Hillhouse came alive in the fourth quarter. He scored 7 out of the last 10 points for the Warriors, in route to a second Philadelphia win, 85–74.

=== Game 3 ===
April 19

Box score

Philadelphia Warriors 75, Chicago Stags 72
Scoring by quarter: 18–17, 13–14, 16–15, 28–26
Pts: Fulks 26	Pts: Carlson, Zaslofsky 15 each
Philadelphia leads series, 3–0

Chicago Stadium, Chicago, Illinois
Attendance: 2,209

=== Game 4 ===
April 20

Box score

Philadelphia Warriors 73, Chicago Stags 74
Scoring by quarter: 17–19, 17–23, 18–23, 21–9
Pts: Senesky 24; Asts: Fleishman 4	Pts: Zaslofsky 20; Asts: Carlson, Halbert, Seminoff 1 each
Philadelphia leads series, 3–1

Chicago Stadium, Chicago, Illinois
Attendance: 1,934

The Stags staved off elimination and avoided a sweep with a one-point victory.

=== Game 5 ===
April 22

Box score

Chicago Stags 80, Philadelphia Warriors 83
Scoring by quarter: 13–27, 25–13, 30–23, 12–20
Pts: Jaros 21; Asts: Jaros 3	Pts: Fulks 34; Asts: Dallmar 4
Philadelphia wins series, 4–1

Philadelphia Arena, Philadelphia, Pennsylvania
Attendance: 8,221

With less than a minute remaining, Howie Dallmar snapped an 80–80 tie by nailing a jump shot to seal the very first championship for the Warriors. Following the event's conclusion, Warriors players were rewarded $2,000 in prize money, which would almost be a half-season's salary in pay for some of their players.
