= 1947 BAA playoffs =

Basketball play-off tournament

Tournament details
- Dates: April 2 – April 22, 1947
- Season: 1946–47
- Teams: 6

Final positions
- Champions: Philadelphia Warriors (1st title)
- Runners-up: Chicago Stags
- Semifinalists: New York Knicks; Washington Capitols

The 1947 BAA playoffs was the postseason tournament that followed the inaugural Basketball Association of America 1946–47 season. After its 1948–49 season, the BAA merged with the older National Basketball League to create the National Basketball Association or NBA. The tournament concluded with the Philadelphia Warriors defeating the Chicago Stags, 4 games to 1, in the BAA Finals.

The six qualified teams all began tournament play on Wednesday, April 2, and the Finals concluded on Tuesday, April 22. Philadelphia and Chicago played 10 and 11 games in the span of 21 days but their final series was compact, five games in seven days. Greater details on the first ever playoffs held in BAA/NBA history would be explored in Charley Rosen's book called "The First Tip-Off: The Incredible Story of the Birth of the NBA", with an entire chapter dedicated to the intricate details (including why the playoff formatting was the way it was during this season) and behind the scenes business (alongside later interviews with players and personnel that were involved with the playoff teams that season) that occurred both before and during the 1947 BAA playoffs.

For the inaugural BAA/NBA playoffs, the BAA would see not one, but two major competitive professional basketball tournaments taking place at around the exact same time as the 1947 BAA playoffs. The first event was the 1947 NBL playoffs, which took place from March 18–April 9, 1947, and involved a rivaling team from Chicago in the Chicago American Gears that eventually were crowned champions of the NBL for the 1946–47 season's playoffs over the Rochester Royals. The second event was the 1947 World Professional Basketball Tournament, which was held in Chicago (home of the Stags) from April 7–11, 1947, and involved 14 teams from the rivaling National Basketball League alongside independently ran teams, the future Baltimore Bullets BAA/NBA team from the rivaling American Basketball League, and the Portland Indians from the short-lived Pacific Coast Professional Basketball League; that tournament would end with the NBL's Indianapolis Kautskys defeating the NBL's Toledo Jeeps in the championship round. Despite the Stags seeing worthwhile success throughout this season, they would end up debating on whether to fold operations following this season's conclusion due in part to the staggering competition they had to deal with late in the season for financial purposes.

== Playoffs ==
There were no byes. Western and Eastern champions Chicago and Washington immediately played a long semifinal series with Washington having home-court advantage. Chicago won the sixth game in Washington one day before Philadelphia concluded its two short series with other runners-up. In the 1947 BAA Finals, the Philadelphia Warriors defeated the Chicago Stags 4–1.

=== Bracket ===
First Round
E3	New York	2
W3	Cleveland	1
W2	St. Louis	1
E2	Philadelphia	2

BAA Semifinals
W1	Chicago*	4
E1	Washington*	2
E3	New York	0
E2	Philadelphia	2

BAA Finals
W1	Chicago*	1
E2	Philadelphia	4

- * Division winner
- Bold Series winner

== First round ==
=== (E2) Philadelphia Warriors vs. (W2) St. Louis Bombers ===
April 2

Boxscore

St. Louis Bombers 68, Philadelphia Warriors 73
Scoring by quarter: 20–19, 15–24, 13–19, 20–11
Pts: Munroe, Logan 16 each	Pts: Angelo Musi 19
Philadelphia leads series, 1–0

Philadelphia Arena, Philadelphia, Pennsylvania
Attendance: 8,273

April 5

Boxscore

Philadelphia Warriors 51, St. Louis Bombers 73
Scoring by quarter: 12–19, 15–19, 13–17, 11–18
Pts: Angelo Musi 12	Pts: Belus Smawley 17
Series tied, 1–1

St. Louis Arena, St. Louis, Missouri

April 6

Boxscore

Philadelphia Warriors 75, St. Louis Bombers 59
Scoring by quarter: 20–14, 16–19, 23–10, 16–16
Pts: Joe Fulks 24	Pts: Belus Smawley 21
Philadelphia wins series, 2–1

St. Louis Arena, St. Louis, Missouri

This was the first playoff meeting between these two teams.

=== (E3) New York Knicks vs. (W3) Cleveland Rebels ===
April 2

Boxscore

New York Knicks 51, Cleveland Rebels 77
Scoring by quarter: 7–22, 17–17, 9–15, 18–23
Pts: Lee Knorek 10	Pts: Ed Sadowski 24
Cleveland leads series, 1–0

Cleveland Arena, Cleveland, Ohio

April 5

Boxscore

Cleveland Rebels 74, New York Knicks 86
Scoring by quarter: 15–23, 28–18, 13–24, 18–21
Pts: Ed Sadowski 26	Pts: Stan Stutz 30
Series tied, 1–1

Madison Square Garden III, Manhattan, New York
Attendance: 10,321

April 9

Boxscore

Cleveland Rebels 71, New York Knicks 93
Scoring by half: 35–45, 36–48
Pts: Ed Sadowski 21	Pts: Bud Palmer 26
New York wins series, 2–1

Madison Square Garden III, Manhattan, New York
Attendance: 5,124

This was the first playoff meeting between these two teams.

== BAA Semifinals ==
=== (E1) Washington Capitols vs. (W1) Chicago Stags ===
April 2

Boxscore

Chicago Stags 81, Washington Capitols 65
Scoring by quarter: 15–17, 20–16, 26–13, 20–19
Pts: Tony Jaros 29	Pts: Scolari, Feerick 13 each
Chicago leads series, 1–0

Uline Arena, Washington, D.C.
Referees: Pat Kennedy, Nate Messenger

April 3

Boxscore

Chicago Stags 69, Washington Capitols 53
Scoring by quarter: 19–10, 17–18, 14–15, 19–10
Pts: Max Zaslofsky 15	Pts: Bob Feerick 19
Chicago leads series, 2–0

Uline Arena, Washington, D.C.
Referees: Pat Kennedy, Nate Messenger

April 8

Boxscore

Washington Capitols 55, Chicago Stags 67
Scoring by quarter: 12–19, 19–13, 14–24, 10–11
Pts: Bob Feerick 16	Pts: Don Carlson 22
Chicago leads series, 3–0

Chicago Stadium, Chicago, Illinois
Referees: Pat Kennedy, Nate Messenger

April 10

Boxscore

Chicago Stags 69, Washington Capitols 76
Scoring by quarter: 8–13, 16–16, 19–23, 26–24
Pts: Zaslofsky, Carlson 21 each	Pts: John Mahnken 18
Chicago leads series, 3–1

Uline Arena, Washington, D.C.
Referees: Pat Kennedy, Nate Messenger

April 12

Boxscore

Washington Capitols 67, Chicago Stags 55
Scoring by quarter: 11–12, 16–16, 17–14, 23–13
Pts: Bob Feerick 18	Pts: Max Zaslofsky 20
Chicago leads series, 3–2

Chicago Stadium, Chicago, Illinois

April 13

Boxscore

Washington Capitols 61, Chicago Stags 66
Scoring by quarter: 10–20, 19–10, 19–22, 13–14
Pts: Fred Scolari 25	Pts: Chick Halbert 25
Chicago wins series, 4–2

Chicago Stadium, Chicago, Illinois
Referees: Pat Kennedy, Nate Messenger

This was the first playoff meeting between these two teams.

=== (E2) Philadelphia Warriors vs. (E3) New York Knicks ===
April 12

Boxscore

New York Knicks 70, Philadelphia Warriors 82
Scoring by quarter: 22–25, 20–23, 15–14, 13–20
Pts: Lee Knorek 20	Pts: Joe Fulks 24
Philadelphia leads series, 1–0

Philadelphia Arena, Philadelphia, Pennsylvania
Referees: John Nucatola, Ed Boyle

This was the first playoff meeting between these two teams.

April 14

Boxscore

Philadelphia Warriors 72, New York Knicks 53
Scoring by quarter: 20–6, 19–13, 12–14, 22–20
Pts: Joe Fulks 16	Pts: Tommy Byrnes 11
Philadelphia wins series, 2–0

Madison Square Garden III, Manhattan, New York
Referees: John Nucatola, Ed Boyle

== BAA Finals: (E2) Philadelphia Warriors vs. (W1) Chicago Stags ==
April 16

Boxscore

Chicago Stags 71, Philadelphia Warriors 84
Scoring by quarter: 12–20, 12–10, 22–22, 25–32
Pts: Chick Halbert 19; Asts: Mickey Rottner 2	Pts: Joe Fulks 37; Asts: Howie Dallmar 4
Philadelphia leads series, 1–0

Philadelphia Arena, Philadelphia, Pennsylvania
Attendance: 7,918

April 17

Boxscore

Chicago Stags 74, Philadelphia Warriors 85
Scoring by quarter: 17–14, 21–27, 21–22, 15–22
Pts: Chet Carlisle 19; Asts: four players 1 each	Pts: Howie Dallmar 18; Asts: Ralph Kaplowitz 2
Philadelphia leads series, 2–0

Philadelphia Arena, Philadelphia, Pennsylvania
Attendance: 7,604

April 19

Boxscore

Philadelphia Warriors 75, Chicago Stags 72
Scoring by quarter: 18–17, 13–14, 16–15, 28–26
Pts: Joe Fulks 26	Pts: Zaslofsky, Carlson 15 each
Philadelphia leads series, 3–0

Chicago Stadium, Chicago, Illinois
Attendance: 2,209
Referees: Pat Kennedy, Jim Beiersdorfer

April 20

Boxscore

Philadelphia Warriors 73, Chicago Stags 74
Scoring by quarter: 17–19, 17–23, 18–23, 21–9
Pts: George Senesky 24; Asts: Jerry Fleishman 4	Pts: Max Zaslofsky 20; Asts: three players 1 each
Philadelphia leads series, 3–1

Chicago Stadium, Chicago, Illinois
Attendance: 1,934
Referees: Pat Kennedy, Jim Beiersdorfer

April 22

Boxscore

Chicago Stags 80, Philadelphia Warriors 83
Scoring by quarter: 13–27, 25–13, 30–23, 12–20
Pts: Tony Jaros 21; Asts: Tony Jaros 3	Pts: Joe Fulks 34; Asts: Howie Dallmar 4
Philadelphia wins series, 4–1

Philadelphia Arena, Philadelphia, Pennsylvania
Attendance: 8,221

This was the first playoff meeting between these two teams.

== See also ==
- NBA records
- List of NBA postseason records
