= Sydnor =

Sydnor is a surname. Notable people with the surname include:

- Buck Sydnor (1921–2003), American basketball player
- Charles Sydnor (disambiguation), multiple people
- Eugene B. Sydnor Jr. (1917–2003), American businessman and politician
- Willie Sydnor (born 1959), American football player
