= Bob Rensberger =

American basketball player (1921–2007)

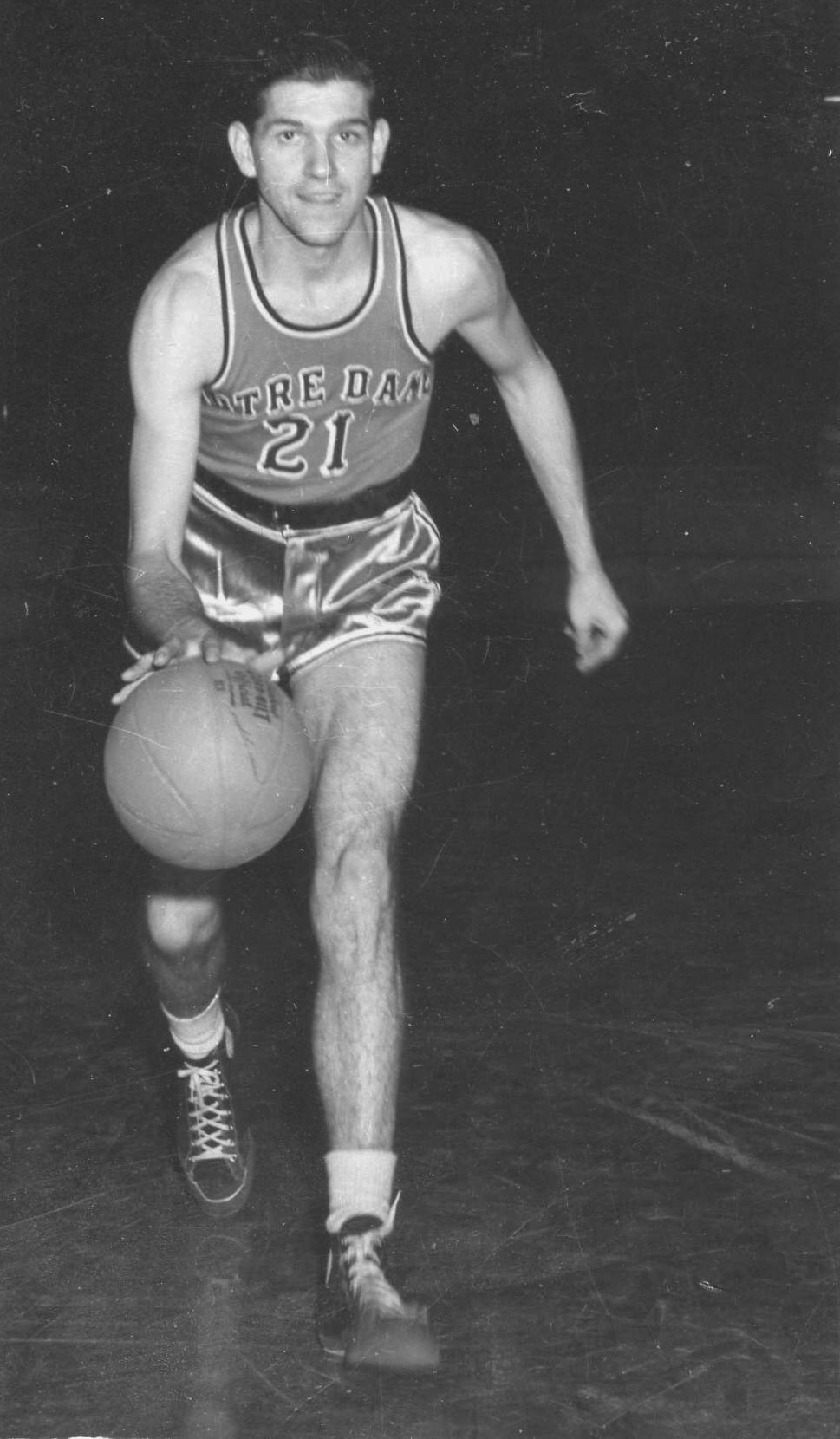
- Rensberger at Notre Dame

Personal information
- Born: March 7, 1921 Nappanee, Indiana, U.S.
- Died: September 6, 2007 (aged 86) Bremen, Indiana, U.S.
- Listed height: 6 ft 2 in (1.88 m)
- Listed weight: 170 lb (77 kg)

Career information
- High school: Nappanee (Nappanee, Indiana)
- College: Notre Dame (1940–1943)
- Playing career: 1945–1947
- Position: Forward

Career history
- 1945–1946: Chicago American Gears
- 1946–1947: Chicago Stags

Career highlights
- Consensus second-team All-American (1943)

Career statistics
- Games played: 3
- Points: 0
- Personal fouls: 4
- Stats at NBA.com
- Stats at Basketball Reference

Robert Lamar Rensberger (March 7, 1921 – September 6, 2007) was an American professional basketball player. He played one season for the Chicago Stags of the Basketball Association of America (BAA) in 1946–47. He only appeared in three total games, shot 0-for-7 in total field goal attempts, scored zero career points and ended up with four personal fouls.

A native of Nappanee, Indiana, Rensberger attended Nappanee High School and graduated in 1939. He then enrolled at the University of Notre Dame and played for the men's basketball team from 1940–41 to 1942–43. As a senior, Rensberger averaged 9.3 points per game (ppg) after posting 6.7 ppg the year before, and he was named a consensus Second Team All-American at the end of his final season.

During the middle of his senior year, Fighting Irish head coach George Keogan suffered a heart attack and died. Rensberger and his teammates served as the pallbearers for Keogan's funeral on the afternoon of February 20, 1943, before playing a game that same night.

== BAA career statistics ==
Legend
GP	Games played
FG%	Field-goal percentage
FT%	Free-throw percentage
APG	Assists per game
PPG	Points per game

=== Regular season ===
Year	Team	GP	FG%	FT%	APG	PPG
1946–47	Chicago	3	.000	.000	.0	.0
Career		3	.000	.000	.0	.0
