= NBA playoffs =

Elimination tournament in the National Basketball Association

- Most recent season or competition: 2026 NBA playoffs
- Sport: Basketball
- Founded: 1946
- No. of teams: 16 (postseason), 20 (including play-in tournament)
- Most recent champion: New York Knicks (2026)
- Most titles: Boston Celtics (18)
- Broadcasters: United States: ABC/ESPN/ESPN+; NBC/Peacock; Amazon Prime Video; Canada: TSN/TSN2; Sportsnet/Sportsnet One; NBA TV Canada; International: Broadcasters
- Website: National Basketball Association

The NBA playoffs is the annual postseason tournament of the National Basketball Association (NBA) to determine the league’s champion. The playoffs date back to 1947 when the NBA was then known as the Basketball Association of America, and eventually expanded to the present-day four-round, best-of-seven tournament in 2003. Since 2020, it has been held after the preliminary postseason tournament, the NBA play-in tournament. Under the current postseason format since 2021, six teams from each of the two conferences automatically advance to the playoffs based on regular season winning percentage, while those teams finishing seventh through tenth from each conference first compete in the play-in tournament to determine the final two playoff seeds. The playoffs culminate with the NBA Finals, where both conference champions from the NBA conference finals play each other.

== Format ==
The top six teams in both the Eastern Conference and Western Conference, ranked by winning percentage, directly advance to the playoffs. Teams ranked seventh through tenth compete in the NBA play-in tournament for the seventh and eighth seeds.

Officially considered separate from the NBA playoffs, the NBA play-in tournament uses a modified Page playoff format in which the seventh- and eighth-place teams play each other in a qualification game, with the winner being given the opportunity to play as the seventh seed of the playoffs. Meanwhile, the ninth- and tenth-place teams play each other in an elimination game, with the loser being eliminated and the winner playing the loser of the seven-eight game in a final game to determine who earns the eighth playoff seed.

Both conferences conduct the playoffs in the traditional bracket format. All rounds are best-of-seven series. Series are played in the 2–2–1–1–2 format, meaning the team with home-court advantage hosts games 1, 2, 5, and 7, while their opponent hosts games 3, 4, and 6, with games 5, 6 and 7 being played if needed. This format has been used since 2014, after NBA team owners unanimously voted to change the format of the NBA Finals from the 2–3–2 format on October 23, 2013. Once the playoffs start, the bracket is fixed; teams are never "reseeded."

=== Tiebreaker criteria ===
If at least two teams within the same conference are tied in overall winning percentage, tiebreaker criteria are used to determine final rankings.

The tiebreaker criteria are as follows, with coin tosses (two teams) or draw of lots (at least three teams) if all of those fail:

1. Head-to-head record; better record in games with the tied teams.
2. Division record; better record in games against teams in its own division (Only if the teams are in the same division).
3. Conference record; better record in games against teams in its own conference.
4. Winning percentage against playoff teams in its own conference.
5. Winning percentage against playoff teams in the opposing conference.
6. Point differential in all games.

Should at least three teams tie, division leaders are given higher seeds regardless of any other criteria. Plus, once any team is eliminated from a tiebreaker, the evaluation goes back to the first step for the remaining teams. Prior to 2016, this rule was also used for two-team ties, but only applied if the two teams have the same head-to-head record.

== History ==
The National Basketball Association was established in 1949 by merger of the Basketball Association of America (BAA) and National Basketball League but it recognizes the three BAA seasons as part of its own history. In all of its three years the BAA champion was finally determined in a best-of-seven series but its first two tournaments, the 1947 and 1948 BAA playoffs, were otherwise quite different from the third, which 21st-century NBA playoffs nearly match. In 1947 and 1948, the Eastern and Western Division champions were matched in a best-of-seven series following the regular season, whose winner advanced to the championship round. Meanwhile, four runners-up played best-of-three series to determine the other finalist: the two second-place teams were matched in one short series and the two third-place teams in another; the winners of those two series played another one. In 1947, the Philadelphia Warriors won the runners-up bracket and beat the Western champion Chicago Stags four games to one, which the NBA recognizes as its first championship; in 1948 Baltimore won the runners-up and beat Eastern champion Philadelphia in the final. Both tournaments generated one finalist from the Eastern and one from the Western Division, but only by chance.

In 1949, the third and last BAA tournament matched Eastern teams exclusively and Western teams exclusively, necessarily generating Eastern and Western playoff champions to meet in the final. At the same time, the number of playoff teams was increased from three to four from each Division; two rounds of best-of-three series were played, followed by a best-of-seven championship. The main idea was retained by the NBA. Even the 1950 tournament, following a transitional season with three divisions rather than two, initially determined one playoff champion from each division. The Central champion Minneapolis Lakers became the first league champion under the NBA name by defeating Anderson from the West in a best-of-three, with Syracuse from the East idle, and then knocking off the Syracuse Nationals in six games.

The 1951 through 1953 playoffs changed the division finals into a best-of-five playoff. With only nine league members in 1953–54, the NBA cut its postseason tournament field from eight teams to six (from 1954 through 1966, the period of eight to nine league members). Round robin were played in 1954, uniquely in NBA history—a three-team round robin among the three playoff teams in each division. From 1955 to 1966, the first-place team in each division was idle while its two runners-up faced played a best-of-three. Division finals were expanded to best-of-seven in 1958 and division semifinals to best-of-five in 1961.

With ten league members again for the 1966–67 season, eight teams were again admitted to the tournament, providing a simple three-round knockout (8-team bracket). A year later, the division semifinals were changed to best-of-seven playoff. Then, in 1975 and 1977, respectively, a fifth and sixth team were added to each Division, necessitating an additional first round of best-of-three series.

Finally in 1984, the tournament expanded to its present 16-team, four-round knockout, and the now-complete set of first-round series was expanded to a best-of-five. In 2003 the first round was changed to also be best-of-seven.

Beginning with the 2004 season, with the addition of the 30th NBA franchise, the Charlotte Bobcats, the NBA realigned its divisions. The result was that each conference would have three divisions of five teams each, and the winner of each division was guaranteed a top-three playoff seed. This would change slightly after the 2005–06 season; while division winners still receive automatic playoff berths, they are guaranteed a top-four seed, as described below.

=== 2006 NBA playoffs controversy ===
The playoff format in place for the 2005 and 2006 NBA playoffs created controversy and would be changed prior to the 2006–07 NBA season.

Prior to 2004, when the NBA was aligned into two conferences with two divisions each, the division champions were guaranteed the top two seeds, and the best non-division winner was seeded third regardless of record. Because of the NBA playoffs' preset matchups in the second round, this meant that the top two teams in a conference by regular season record cannot meet until the Conference Finals if they get there.

After the NBA realigned its two conferences into three divisions each, the seeding rules remained largely unchanged. The top three seeds would now be reserved for division champions. However, this meant that if the top two teams (by record) in a conference were in the same division, the division runner-up could do no better than the fourth seed. Assuming no first-round upsets, this raised the prospect that the top two teams in the conference would face each other in the conference semifinals, instead of the conference finals. In the second year of this format, the 2005–06 NBA season, the two teams with the best records in the Western Conference (and the second- and third-best records in the entire league), the San Antonio Spurs and Dallas Mavericks of the Southwest Division, did just that. This turn of events led to the playoff format being criticized by many.

In August 2006, the NBA announced a rules change. Beginning in the 2006–07 season, the top four seeds in each conference would be seeded according to their win–loss totals. This assures that the team with the second-best record in the conference will receive the second seed even if it is not a division champion, thus "guaranteeing that the top two teams in each conference cannot meet until the conference finals at the earliest".

=== Timeline ===
- 1947: The playoffs were instituted with a three-stage tournament, similar to the Stanley Cup playoffs of the 1930s; the two first-place teams qualified directly to one semifinal where they played each other in a best-of-7 series. Teams finishing second & third qualified for the best-of-3 quarterfinals, where the two second-placed teams were paired in one quarterfinal, as were the two third-placed teams, and the two quarterfinal winners played each other in a best-of-three semifinal. The two semifinal winners played each other in the Basketball Association of America (BAA) best-of-7 final series.

Quarterfinals; Best-of-3
E3
W3
W2
E2

Semifinals; Best-of-3 (E/W2 vs. E/W3); Best-of-7 (E1 vs. W1)
W1
E1

BAA finals Best-of-7

There were no byes, or idle time, for the division champions—as there would be for higher-seeded playoff teams 1955–66 and 1975–83. All six 1947 participants played their first tournament games on Wednesday, April 2; in 1948 the two Eastern runners-up (E2, E3 in the figure) were idle for a few days only because there was a three-way Western tie to break. Both winners of the runners-up bracket, Philadelphia in 1947 and Baltimore in 1948, reached the final series having played fewer tournament games than their final opponents, Chicago in 1947 and Philadelphia in 1948, had played in the best-of-7 pairings of division champions. And both winners of the runners-up bracket won the final series. The "postseason" actually comprised 11 games played in a span of 21 days for the 1947 Chicago Stags and 13 games in 30 days for 1948 Philadelphia Warriors, the finalists who emerged from the pairing of division champions.

- 1949: The playoffs were reorganized to match Eastern Division teams exclusively, and Western Division teams exclusively in two halves of the bracket. Thus the BAA tournament generated a playoff champion in each Division. (So did the NBA in each of three 1950 divisions, and so it has done in each half of the league since then.) The top four teams from each of the two divisions qualified. The quarterfinals and semifinals were renamed division semifinals and division finals, respectively, and both rounds were best-of-3. Thus, any playoff team might be eliminated in two games, one home game. The best-of-7 final was unchanged.

Division Semifinals; Best-of-3
E1
E4
Eastern Division
E3
E2
W1
W4
Western Division
W2
W3

Division Finals; Best-of-3

NBA Finals; Best-of-7

- 1950: The BAA was renamed as the National Basketball Association (NBA). With a three-division setup, 12 teams now qualified for the playoffs, with the top four teams from each division meeting in the best-of-3 division semifinals. The winners met in the best-of-3 division finals. With three teams remaining, the surviving team with the best regular season record qualified directly for the finals while the other two teams met in a best-of-3 NBA semifinals.

Division Semifinals; Best-of-3
C1
C4
Central Division
C3
C2
E1
E4
Eastern Division
E3
E2
W1
W4
Western Division
W3
W2

Division Finals; Best-of-3

NBA Semifinals; Best-of-3
3
2

NBA Finals; Best-of-7
1

- 1951: With the NBA reverting to a two-division setup; the division semifinals reverted to its original 1949 format with only eight teams qualifying. The division finals was extended to a best-of-5 format.

Division Semifinals; Best-of-3
E1
E4
Eastern Division
E2
E3
W1
W4
Western Division
W2
W3

Division Finals; Best-of-5

NBA Finals; Best-of-7

- 1954: With only nine league members (soon to be eight), the number of playoff teams was cut down to six. The division semifinals was changed to a double round-robin format within the division, with the top three teams from each division qualifying (each team played four games). Following the round-robin games, the top two teams qualified for the best-of-three division finals, followed by the best-of-seven finals.

Division Round Robin Semifinals
E1
E2
E3
W1
W2
W3

Division Finals; Best-of-3
Eastern Division
E1
E2
Western Division
W1
W2

NBA Finals; Best-of-7

- 1955: The number of playoff teams remained at six, but the initial round-robin was dropped after one year in favor of giving the first-place team in each division a bye to the best-of-five division finals. Teams which placed second and third played a best-of-three division semifinal. In 1955 the byes provided five and six extra days idle for the first-place teams.
- 1958: The division finals was extended to a best-of-seven format.
- 1961: The division semifinals were extended to a best-of-five format.

Division Semifinals; Best-of-3 (1955–1960), Best-of-5 (1961–1966)
E2
E3
W2
W3

Division Finals; Best-of-5 (1955–1957), Best-of-7 (1958–1966)
Eastern Division
E1
Western Division
W1

NBA Finals; Best-of-7

The 1961 to 1966 tournaments alone combined initial byes for the top seeded teams in each division with best-of-five initial series for second and third seeded teams in both divisions. The 1961 byes provided five and seven extra days idle for the first-place teams. By 1966 the schedule provided more rest for the first-round participants with byes of 11 and eight extra days idle.

- 1967: The number of playoff teams was expanded to eight once more. The division semifinals now included the fourth-best team in each conference. The first-placed teams no longer received a bye. They were matched against the third-placed teams in the best-of-5 division semifinals, while the second-placed teams were now matched against the fourth-placed teams.
- 1968: The division semifinals was extended to a best-of-seven format.

Division Semifinals; Best-of-5 (1967), Best-of-7 (1968–1970)
E1
E3
Eastern Division
E2
E4
W1
W3
Western Division
W2
W4

Division Finals; Best-of-7 (1968–1970)

NBA Finals; Best-of-7

- 1971: With an increased number of teams, the divisions were upgraded into conferences, which were then split into two divisions. Eight teams still qualified, four from each conference. Hence, the division semifinals and division finals came to be known as conference semifinals and conference finals, respectively. The top two teams in each division qualified as the Eastern Conference, comprising the Atlantic and Central divisions, while the Western Conference consisted of the Midwest and Pacific divisions. The first place team from one division would face the second place team of the other division within their conference. In the conference playoffs, a division winner always held home-court advantage over a second place team regardless of record.

Conference Semifinals; Best-of-7
A1
C2
Eastern Conference
C1
A2
M1
P2
Western Conference
P1
M2

Conference Finals; Best-of-7

NBA Finals; Best-of-7

- 1973: The playoff format was modified, as only the divisional champions qualified automatically; two wild-cards were also added from each conference. Once qualification was determined, the four qualifiers were seeded 1–4 based on record; divisional position no longer mattered. The No. 1 seed then played No. 4, and No. 2 played No. 3.

Conference Semifinals; Best-of-7
E1
E4
Eastern Conference
E3
E2
W1
W4
Western Conference
W3
W2

Conference Finals; Best-of-7

NBA Finals; Best-of-7

- 1975: The number of playoff teams was expanded from eight to ten. A first round was introduced which matched the fourth and fifth seeds in each conference in a best-of-3 first-round series, while the top three seeds received a bye. A similar system was used in the MLB Playoffs from 2012-2021. Division winners did not automatically receive a bye to the Conference Semifinals.

First Round; Best-of-3
E4
E5
W4
W5

Conference Semifinals; Best-of-7
E1
Eastern Conference
E2
E3
W1
Western Conference
W2
W3

Conference Finals; Best-of-7

NBA Finals; Best-of-7

- 1977: The number of playoff teams was expanded from 10 to 12. The first round now included the sixth best team in each conference, which was matched against the third seed. Only the division winners received byes to the next round.

First Round; Best-of-3
E4
E5
E3
E6
W4
W5
W3
W6

Conference Semifinals; Best-of-7
E1*
Eastern Conference
E2*
W1*
Western Conference
W2*

Conference Finals; Best-of-7

NBA Finals; Best-of-7

The 1983 tournament is the latest to incorporate first-round byes for seeded teams. The first-round best-of-three series tapped off on Tuesday and Wednesday, April 19 and 20; the second-round best-of-sevens on Sunday to the following Wednesday, April 27. Counting from Tuesday the byes provided five to eight extra days idle.

- 1984: The playoffs were expanded from 12 teams to 16 teams. All teams now participated in the first round, which was extended to a best-of-five series.

First Round; Best-of-5
E1*
E8
E4
E5
Eastern Conference
E3
E6
E2*
E7
W1*
W8
W4
W5
Western Conference
W3
W6
W2*
W7

Conference Semifinals; Best-of-7

Conference Finals; Best-of-7

NBA Finals; Best-of-7

- 2003: The first round was extended to a best-of-seven series. This change arguably benefitted the higher seeds as it reduced the likelihood of an upset by a lower seed. It also meant that a team that swept their series 4–0 might have to wait up to two weeks to play their next series against a team that had won 4–3.

First Round; Best-of-7
E1*
E8
E4
E5
Eastern Conference
E3
E6
E2*
E7
W1*
W8
W4
W5
Western Conference
W3
W6
W2*
W7

Conference Semifinals; Best-of-7

Conference Finals; Best-of-7

NBA Finals; Best-of-7

- 2005: Each conference was realigned into three divisions with each division winner qualifying for a top-three seed regardless of record. The next best five teams from each conference also qualify for the playoffs.

First Round; Best-of-7
E1*
E8
E4
E5
Eastern Conference
E3*
E6
E2*
E7
W1*
W8
W4
W5
Western Conference
W3*
W6
W2*
W7

Conference Semifinals; Best-of-7

Conference Finals; Best-of-7

NBA Finals; Best-of-7

- 2007: To address the criticisms of having each division champion guaranteed a top-three seed, regardless of record, the rules were changed such that the division winners are now only guaranteed a top-four seed. The team with the second-best record in the conference is now guaranteed the second seed, even if it finishes second in its own division. This ensures that the two best teams in the conference will not meet until the conference finals at the earliest. The previous system raised the prospect of the two best teams in the conference being seeded 1 and 4 if they play in the same division, thus forcing them to play each other in the second round (given no upsets).
  - Note: In the example below, both the East's No. 2 seed and the West's No. 3 seed are not division champions.

First Round; Best-of-7
E1*
E8
E5
E4*
Eastern Conference
E3*
E6
E2
E7
W1*
W8
W5
W4*
Western Conference
W3
W6
W2*
W7

Conference Semifinals; Best-of-7

Conference Finals; Best-of-7

NBA Finals; Best-of-7

- 2016: While the playoff bracketing did not change, qualification criteria were changed. The teams with the eight best records in each conference receive playoff berths, with no automatic berths or guaranteed top-four seed placement for division champions.
  - Note: In the example below, both the East's No. 7 seed and the West's No. 5 seed are division champions.

First Round; Best-of-7
E1*
E8
E5
E4
Eastern Conference
E3
E6
E2*
E7*
W1*
W8
W4
W5*
Western Conference
W3
W6
W2*
W7

Conference Semifinals; Best-of-7

Conference Finals; Best-of-7

NBA Finals; Best-of-7

- 2020: Beginning in 2020, play-in games were used to determine the final qualified team(s) in the first round of the NBA playoffs.

In the 2020 play-in format, if the ninth-place team within a conference finished the regular season within four games of the eighth-place team, they would compete in a postseason play-in series. This format was used only in the Western Conference, as the No. 9 Memphis Grizzlies finished within a half-game of the No. 8 Portland Trail Blazers. Described as a best-of-two series, the Trail Blazers, needing only one win as the higher seed, eliminated the Grizzlies in game one to advance to the playoffs.

- 2021: In 2021, the format for the play-in games was finalized.

In 2021, the top six teams in each conference advance to the playoffs, while seventh- through tenth-placed teams qualified for a play-in tournament. The seventh- and eighth-place teams got up to two chances to win one game to qualify for the playoffs, while the ninth- and tenth-place teams needed to win two consecutive games to advance. The play-in games would become a permanent part of the postseason starting in 2023.

No. 7 Seed and Elimination
7
8
9
10

No. 8 Seed
L1
W2

Final Seeds
W1	No. 7 Seed
W3	No. 8 Seed

W1 is Winner of 7/8 game
L1 is Loser of 7/8 game
W2 is Winner of 9/10 game
W3 is Winner of W2 / L1 game.

== Team rosters ==
Playoff teams must identify their postseason rosters before the playoffs begin. They are allowed up to 15 players each and can designate two players as inactive for each game. Players are eligible to be on a team's playoff roster as long as they were on the team for at least one regular season game, and were not on another NBA team's roster after March 1. Prior to the 2005–06 season, playoff rosters were limited to 12 players who were named before the playoffs began.

== Records and statistics ==
- Only six eighth-seeded teams have managed to win a series versus the number 1 seeded team:
  - 1994 – The Denver Nuggets eliminated the Seattle SuperSonics 3–2.
  - 1999 – The New York Knicks eliminated the Miami Heat 3–2.
  - 2007 – The Golden State Warriors defeated the Dallas Mavericks 4–2 in the Western Conference First Round, becoming the first 8 seed to beat a 1 seed in the best of 7 format.
  - 2011 – The Memphis Grizzlies beat the San Antonio Spurs 4–2.
  - 2012 – The Philadelphia 76ers beat the Chicago Bulls 4–2, following a torn ACL to Bulls star Derrick Rose.
  - 2023 – The Miami Heat beat the Milwaukee Bucks 4–1, becoming the first eight seed to win a playoff series after qualifying for the NBA play-in tournament. The Heat finished the regular season 7th in the Eastern Conference but were relegated to the eighth seed following the play-in tournament. They are also the first team to win their division but qualify for the play-in games, having won the Southeast Division title with the worst record, and they eventually became the lowest-seed division winner in playoff history.
- The 1998–99 Knicks and the 2022–23 Heat are the only eighth-seeded teams to reach the NBA Finals; no eighth-seeded team has won the NBA championship as of 2025. In addition, the Heat are the first team to reach the Finals after qualifying for the play-in tournament.
- Eight seventh-seeded teams have beaten a number 2 seeded team:
  - 1987 – The Seattle SuperSonics defeated the Dallas Mavericks 3–1.
  - 1989 – The Golden State Warriors defeated the Utah Jazz 3–0.
  - 1991 – The Golden State Warriors defeated the San Antonio Spurs 3–1.
  - 1998 – The New York Knicks defeated the Miami Heat 3–2.
  - 2010 – The San Antonio Spurs defeated the Dallas Mavericks 4–2.
  - 2023 – The Los Angeles Lakers defeated the Memphis Grizzlies 4–2.
  - 2025 – The Golden State Warriors defeated the Houston Rockets 4–3.
  - 2026 – The Philadelphia 76ers defeated the Boston Celtics 4–3.
- Of the eight teams, only the 1986–87 Seattle SuperSonics and the 2022–23 Los Angeles Lakers made it as far as the Conference Finals; no seventh-seeded team has advanced to the NBA Finals.
- The 2022–23 Miami Heat and Los Angeles Lakers, the 2024–25 Golden State Warriors, and the 2025–26 Philadelphia 76ers are the only teams to win a playoff series after qualifying for the play-in tournament. The 2023 playoffs also marked the first time two teams seeded 7th or lower won a playoff series in a single postseason, and the first time two teams seeded 7th or lower reached the Conference Finals.
- The 2024–25 Miami Heat became the first team to qualify for the playoffs after finishing 10th in their conference during the regular season. The Heat defeated the 9th-place Chicago Bulls 109–90 and the 8th-place Atlanta Hawks 123–114 in overtime of the play-in tournament to earn the 8th and final playoff spot.
- Five teams have made the playoffs despite losing 50 or more games in a season:
  - 1953 – Baltimore Bullets (16–54, .229)
  - 1960 – Minneapolis Lakers (25–50, .333)
  - 1968 – Chicago Bulls (29–53, .354)
  - 1986 – Chicago Bulls (30–52, .366)
  - 1988 – San Antonio Spurs (31–51, .378)
- Of these teams, only the 1959–60 Minneapolis Lakers made it as far as the Division/Conference Finals.
- The 2007–08 Denver Nuggets and the 2009–10 Oklahoma City Thunder are the only teams to win at least 50 games and qualify for the playoffs as the eighth seed. As of 2026, no 50-win team has been relegated to the play-in tournament.
- The 1956–57 St. Louis Hawks, 1958–59 Minneapolis Lakers and the 1980–81 Houston Rockets are the only teams with losing records (34–38, 33–39 and 40–42, respectively) to make it to the NBA Finals. All three lost to the Boston Celtics. In 1981, the Houston Rockets' opponent in the Western Conference Finals, the Kansas City Kings, also had a losing record (40–42).
- The 1977–78 Washington Bullets own the lowest win total and win percentage of any NBA championship team. The Bullets finished the season with a 44–38 (.538) record, and earned the third seed in the Eastern Conference. In the Finals, they defeated the 47-win Seattle SuperSonics, which remain the most recent NBA Finals not to feature at least one team with 50 or more wins in a full-length season.
- The 1994–95 Houston Rockets, a sixth seed with a record of 47–35, are the lowest-seeded team to win the NBA Finals. In the NBA Finals, the Rockets swept the Orlando Magic (57–25) in four games; in doing so, the Rockets defeated four teams that had won 50 or more games during the regular season (the Utah Jazz at 60–22, the Phoenix Suns at 59–23, the San Antonio Spurs at 62–20 and Orlando at 57–25), the first time a team had done so. As of now, the 1994–95 Rockets are the only team to have won an NBA title without having home-court advantage during any round of the playoffs.
- There have been 18 instances in which a team won 60 or more games but failed to advance to the Conference Finals. Ten of those teams finished as the top seed in their conference.
  - 1973 – Milwaukee Bucks (60–22, .732; lost in conference semifinals to Golden State Warriors)
  - 1981 – Milwaukee Bucks (60–22, .732; lost in conference semifinals to Philadelphia 76ers)
  - 1990 – Los Angeles Lakers (63–19, .768; lost in conference semifinals to Phoenix Suns)
  - 1994 – Seattle SuperSonics (63–19, .768; lost in first round to Denver Nuggets)
  - 1995 – Utah Jazz (60–22, .732; lost in first round to Houston Rockets)
  - 1998 – Seattle SuperSonics (61–21, .744; lost in conference semifinals to Los Angeles Lakers)
  - 2006 – San Antonio Spurs (63–19, .768; lost in conference semifinals to Dallas Mavericks)
  - 2007 – Dallas Mavericks (67–15, .817; lost in first round to Golden State Warriors)
  - 2007 – Phoenix Suns (61–21, .744; lost in conference semifinals to San Antonio Spurs)
  - 2009 – Boston Celtics (62–20, .756; lost in conference semifinals to Orlando Magic)
  - 2010 – Cleveland Cavaliers (61–21, .744; lost in conference semifinals to Boston Celtics)
  - 2011 – San Antonio Spurs (61–21, .744; lost in first round to Memphis Grizzlies)
  - 2013 – Oklahoma City Thunder (60–22, .732; lost in conference semifinals to Memphis Grizzlies)
  - 2016 – San Antonio Spurs (67–15, .817; lost in conference semifinals to Oklahoma City Thunder)
  - 2022 – Phoenix Suns (64–18, .780; lost in conference semifinals to Dallas Mavericks)
  - 2025 – Cleveland Cavaliers (64–18, .780; lost in conference semifinals to Indiana Pacers)
  - 2025 – Boston Celtics (61–21, .744; lost in conference semifinals to New York Knicks)
  - 2026 – Detroit Pistons (60–22, .732; lost in conference semifinals to Cleveland Cavaliers)
- The Golden State Warriors own the longest NBA playoff winning streak for a single postseason with 15 straight wins in the 2017 playoffs.
- Of all the teams with multiple NBA Finals appearances, the Chicago Bulls are the only team to have never lost in the Finals, winning in all six of their Finals appearances.
- The Boston Celtics possess the most overall NBA Finals series wins with 18. The Celtics have played in 23 NBA Finals series, with an overall record of 18–5.
- The longest active playoff appearance streak currently belongs to the Boston Celtics with 11 consecutive appearances in the playoffs, beginning in the 2014–15 NBA season. The longest streak of playoffs appearances in a row is currently tied at 22 seasons between the San Antonio Spurs, who made it from 1997 to 1998 season until the 2018–19 season, and the Syracuse Nationals/Philadelphia 76ers, who made it from the 1949–50 season to the 1970–71 season.
- As of the 2025–26 season, the longest active playoff drought belongs to the Charlotte Hornets, who have not made the playoffs since the 2015–16 season. The longest all-time playoff drought belongs to the Sacramento Kings, who went 16 seasons without making the playoffs (2006–07 through 2021–22).
- The Charlotte Hornets and New Orleans Pelicans are the only franchises to have never played in the Conference Finals.
- In 1983, under the best of 3(bye)–7–7–7 system, the Philadelphia 76ers, who had a bye in the first round, attained the best record of 12–1, having only lost in Game 4 of the Eastern Conference Finals against the Milwaukee Bucks.
- In 2001, under the best of 5–7–7–7 system, the Los Angeles Lakers attained the best record of 15–1, having only lost in Game 1 of the Finals against the Philadelphia 76ers.
- In 2017, under the best of 7–7–7–7 system, the Golden State Warriors attained the best record of 16–1, having only lost in Game 4 of the Finals against the Cleveland Cavaliers. The Warriors and Cavaliers came into the Finals with a combined record of 24–1, with the Cavaliers having only lost in Game 3 of the Eastern Conference Finals against the Boston Celtics.
- The top four seeded teams all advanced to the Conference Semifinals round in 1980, 1986, 1997, 2002, 2004, 2008, 2019 and 2022.
- Every seed number from 1 to 8 advanced to the Conference Semifinals round in 2023.

== Playoff appearances ==
Current as of the 2026 NBA playoffs

=== Appearances by active teams ===
Team	Appearances
Los Angeles Lakers	66 (Note: Includes appearances as the Minneapolis Lakers (1947–1960).)
Boston Celtics	63
Philadelphia 76ers	55 (Note: Includes appearances as the Syracuse Nationals (1946–1963).)
Atlanta Hawks	50 (Note: Includes appearances as the Tri-Cities Blackhawks (1946–1951), the Milwaukee Hawks (1951–1955), and the St. Louis Hawks (1955–1968).)
New York Knicks	47
Detroit Pistons	44 (Note: Includes appearances as the Fort Wayne Pistons (1949–1957).)
San Antonio Spurs	40 (Note: Does not include appearances in the American Basketball Association (ABA) playoffs. Per the conditions of the ABA–NBA merger, the NBA does not officially recognize the ABA history, playoffs and records.)
Golden State Warriors	38 (Note: Includes appearances as the Philadelphia Warriors (1946–1962) and the San Francisco Warriors (1962–1971).)
Portland Trail Blazers	38
Milwaukee Bucks	37
Chicago Bulls	36
Houston Rockets	36 (Note: Includes appearances as the San Diego Rockets (1967–1971).)
Oklahoma City Thunder	35 (Note: As part of the 2008 relocation settlement with the City of Seattle, the Thunder officially shares its history with that of the Seattle SuperSonics (1967–2008).)
Phoenix Suns	34
Denver Nuggets	32
Utah Jazz	31 (Note: Includes appearances as the New Orleans Jazz (1974–1979).)
Washington Wizards	30 (Note: Includes appearances as the Chicago Packers (1961–1962), the Chicago Zephyrs (1962–1963), the Baltimore Bullets (1963–1973), the Capital Bullets (1973–1974), and the Washington Bullets (1974–1997).)
Sacramento Kings	30 (Note: Includes appearances as the Rochester Royals (1948–1957), the Cincinnati Royals (1957–1972), the Kansas City-Omaha Kings (1972–1975), and the Kansas City Kings (1975–1985).)
Indiana Pacers	29
Cleveland Cavaliers	26
Miami Heat	26
Dallas Mavericks	25
Brooklyn Nets	24 (Note: Includes appearances as the New Jersey Nets (1977–2012).)
Los Angeles Clippers	19 (Note: Includes appearances as the Buffalo Braves (1970–1978).)
Orlando Magic	19
Memphis Grizzlies	14
Minnesota Timberwolves	14
Toronto Raptors	14
Charlotte Hornets	10 (Note: The New Orleans Pelicans were originally the Charlotte Hornets, and moved to New Orleans in 2002. A new team, the Charlotte Bobcats, was then established in 2004. The New Orleans team kept the Hornets nickname from its relocation from Charlotte until 2013. When the Charlotte team reclaimed the Hornets name in a 2014 agreement, it also reclaimed the history and records of the original Charlotte Hornets; as such, the New Orleans Pelicans are considered established in 2002, and the Bobcats/Hornets are considered a linear franchise that was inactive from 2002 to 2004.)
New Orleans Pelicans	9

== All-time NBA playoffs table ==
The all-time NBA playoffs table is an overall record of all match results of every team that has played in playoffs since the 1946–47 season. The table is accurate as of the end of the 2026 NBA playoffs. Bold indicates the highest number.

Franchise	Pld	W	L	PTS	OPP PTS	DIFF PTS	CH	CT
Atlanta Hawks	396	172	224	39,792	41,021	-1,229	1	0
Boston Celtics	756	432	324	79,544	77,679	**1,865**	**18**	11
Brooklyn Nets	171	70	101	16,674	16,996	-322	2	2
Charlotte Hornets	63	23	40	5,853	6,035	-182	0	0
Chicago Bulls	349	187	162	34,079	33,716	363	6	6
Cleveland Cavaliers	269	144	129	27,209	26,852	357	1	5
Dallas Mavericks	249	118	131	25,729	25,987	-258	1	3
Denver Nuggets	262	114	148	28,168	28,713	-545	1	1
Detroit Pistons	392	198	194	37,660	37,512	148	3	5
Golden State Warriors	396	217	179	41,708	41,055	653	7	7
Houston Rockets	335	163	172	34,153	34,310	-157	2	4
Indiana Pacers	281	138	143	27,081	27,033	48	3	3
Los Angeles Clippers	160	69	91	16,757	16,915	-158	0	0
Los Angeles Lakers	**797**	**472**	**325**	**82,832**	**81,068**	1,764	17	**19**
Memphis Grizzlies	102	38	64	10,000	10,477	-477	0	0
Miami Heat	299	163	136	28,697	28,593	104	3	7
Milwaukee Bucks	317	153	164	33,146	32,976	170	2	3
Minnesota Timberwolves	106	45	61	10,650	10,927	-277	0	0
New Orleans Pelicans	59	22	37	5,647	5,909	-262	0	0
New York Knicks	441	226	215	42,662	42,822	-160	3	5
Oklahoma City Thunder	379	197	182	39,009	38,727	282	2	5
Orlando Magic	152	66	86	14,572	14,782	-210	0	2
Philadelphia 76ers	499	255	244	51,226	51,421	-195	3	5
Phoenix Suns	328	160	168	34,762	34,886	-124	0	3
Portland Trail Blazers	279	120	159	28,612	29,331	-719	1	3
Sacramento Kings	194	83	111	19,031	19,396	-365	1	0
San Antonio Spurs	426	235	191	42,795	41,896	899	5	7
Toronto Raptors	130	60	70	12,935	13,144	-209	1	1
Utah Jazz	292	135	157	28,928	29,128	-200	0	2
Washington Wizards	237	99	138	24,097	24,426	-329	1	4

== Media coverage ==
Prior to the 1995 NBA playoffs, not all playoff games were televised by the NBA's national TV partners. Some games were only televised by local over-the-air or regional sports networks affiliated with each participating team. In the NBA's early years, national TV playoff coverage was only exclusive to most Saturdays and Sundays, and prior to the 1974 NBA Finals, not all games of that round were nationally televised.

After CBS took over NBA national TV rights from ABC in 1973, the network increased its inventory of playoff coverage, airing most playoff games on weekends along with select weekday broadcasts. USA Network joined CBS in covering the playoffs starting in 1980, followed by ESPN in 1983, with both networks airing non-exclusive national TV coverage of the playoffs on weekdays, as well as select conference finals games split with CBS. ESPN and USA were then replaced as the NBA's national cable TV partner by TBS starting with the 1985 playoffs, with TNT taking over TBS' national broadcasts starting with the 1990 playoffs. CBS became the exclusive broadcaster of the NBA Finals, which they produced until 1990.

From 1991 to 2002, NBC and Turner Sports shared coverage of the NBA playoffs, with NBC generally broadcasting early-round games on Saturdays and Sundays and Turner broadcasting weeknight and Sunday night games. Both conference finals were mostly broadcast on NBC with a few games assigned to TNT. After the NBA decided to have all playoff games air on national TV in 1995, TBS returned to broadcast select games not assigned to TNT. During this period, NBC became the exclusive broadcaster of the NBA Finals.

From the 2003 playoffs to the 2025 playoffs, coverage of the NBA playoffs have been aired nationally across ABC, ESPN, TNT, and NBA TV. Generally during the first two rounds, ABC broadcasts Sunday afternoon games, TNT has Sunday through Wednesday night games, and ESPN televises Friday night games. For Thursday night games, TNT airs games in the first round and ESPN in the second round. NBA TV generally televises selected Tuesday through Thursday night first-round games, produced by TNT Sports. Saturday first-and second-round games are split by ABC, ESPN, and TNT. Each team's regional broadcaster televise local coverage of first-round games, with the exception of weekend games on ABC. From 2024, TruTV aired simulcasts or alternate broadcasts of select TNT games.

The NBA conference finals are rotated annually, with TNT airing the Eastern Conference Finals in odd-numbered years and the Western Conference Finals in even-numbered years. ESPN then broadcasts the other conference finals series, with at least one of its weekend games airing instead on ABC. During this period, ABC was the exclusive broadcaster of the NBA Finals.

As part of the new 11-year media deals which began with the 2026 playoffs, ABC/ESPN would broadcast about 18 games in the first two rounds each year. NBC would have between 22 and 34 first and second-round games, either televised on NBC or streamed on Peacock. Amazon Prime Video would stream between 14 and 26 first and second-round games. Under the new deals, all first round playoff games will be exclusive to the NBA's national TV partners, whereas in previous years, regional sports networks were allowed to broadcast preliminary round playoff games alongside the national broadcaster (except for games on over-the-air television). For the conference finals, ABC/ESPN would have one series in the first 10 years of the deal, while the other series would be rotated between NBC and Prime Video; in 2036 (the final year of the deal), NBC and Amazon would have the conference finals instead of ABC/ESPN. ABC will continue to exclusively broadcast the NBA Finals, which, dating back to 2003, would extend the network's consecutive streak of airing the series to over 30 years.

== See also ==
- List of NBA champions
