= Garland O'Shields =

American basketball player (1921–2001)

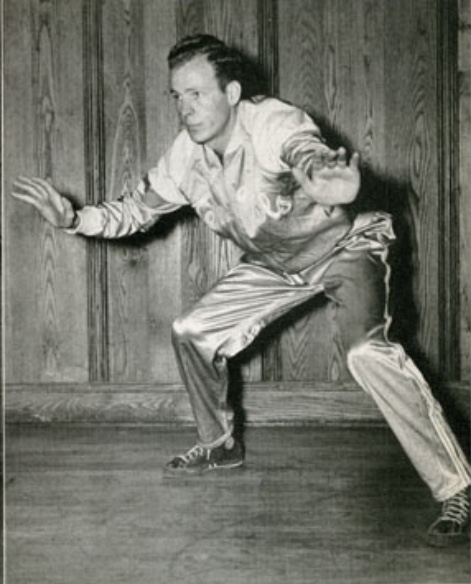
- O’Shields from the 1945 Volunteer

Personal information
- Born: May 23, 1921 Danville, Virginia, U.S.
- Died: January 17, 2001 (aged 79)
- Listed height: 6 ft 1 in (1.85 m)
- Listed weight: 195 lb (88 kg)

Career information
- High school: Spartanburg (Spartanburg, South Carolina)
- College: Spartanburg CC; Tennessee (1944–1946)
- Playing career: 1946–1948
- Position: Guard
- Number: 9

Career history
- 1946–1947: Chicago Stags
- 1947: Syracuse Nationals
- 1947–1948: Mohawk Redskins

Career highlights
- Third-team All-American – Helms (1946)
- Stats at NBA.com
- Stats at Basketball Reference

Garland Lee O'Shields (May 23, 1921 – January 17, 2001) was an American basketball player. He was an All-American college player at Tennessee and played briefly in the National Basketball League (NBL) and Basketball Association of America (BAA), predecessor leagues to the National Basketball Association.

O'Shields played for Spartanburg Community College and Tennessee. Following his college career, he played for the Chicago Stags of the BAA, scoring four points in nine games. The next season, he played for the Syracuse Nationals in the competing NBL, scoring nine points in five games.

== BAA career statistics ==
Legend
GP	Games played
FG%	Field-goal percentage
FT%	Free-throw percentage
APG	Assists per game
PPG	Points per game

=== Regular season ===
Year	Team	GP	FG%	FT%	APG	PPG
1946–47	Chicago	9	.182	.000	.1	.4
Career		9	.182	.000	.1	.4
