= Buck Sydnor =

American basketball player

Personal information
- Born: September 19, 1921 Logan County, Kentucky, U.S.
- Died: September 17, 2003 (aged 81) Louisville, Kentucky, U.S.
- Listed height: 5 ft 10 in (1.78 m)
- Listed weight: 175 lb (79 kg)

Career information
- High school: Olmstead (Olmstead, Kentucky)
- College: Western Kentucky (1940–1943)
- Playing career: 1946–1947
- Position: Guard
- Number: 4

Career history
- 1946–1947: Chicago Stags
- Stats at NBA.com
- Stats at Basketball Reference

Wallace Browder "Buck" Sydnor Jr. (September 19, 1921 – September 17, 2003) was an American professional basketball player. He spent one season in the Basketball Association of America (BAA) as a member of the Chicago Stags during the 1946–47 season. He attended Western Kentucky University.

== BAA career statistics ==
Legend
GP	Games played
FG%	Field-goal percentage
FT%	Free-throw percentage
APG	Assists per game
PPG	Points per game

=== Regular season ===
Year	Team	GP	FG%	FT%	APG	PPG
1946–47	Chicago	15	.192	.500	.0	1.0
Career		15	.192	.500	.0	1.0
