= Ben Schadler =

American basketball player (1924–2015)

Personal information
- Born: March 9, 1924 Benton Harbor, Michigan, U.S.
- Died: January 30, 2015 (aged 90) Camas, Washington, U.S.
- Listed height: 6 ft 0 in (1.83 m)
- Listed weight: 185 lb (84 kg)

Career information
- High school: Benton Harbor (Benton Harbor, Michigan)
- College: Northwestern (1942–1946)
- NBA draft: 1947: – round, –
- Drafted by: Chicago Stags
- Playing career: 1947–1949
- Position: Forward
- Number: 14

Career history
- 1947–1948: Chicago Stags
- 1948: Detroit Vagabond Kings
- 1948–1949: Waterloo Hawks
- Stats at NBA.com
- Stats at Basketball Reference

Bernard Rudolph "Ben" Schadler (March 9, 1924 – January 30, 2015) was an American professional basketball player. Schadler was selected in the 1947 BAA draft by the Chicago Stags after a collegiate career at Northwestern. He played for the Stags in the BAA followed by stints with the Detroit Vagabond Kings and Waterloo Hawks in the National Basketball League.

At Northwestern, Schadler played basketball, football, and baseball. He was also selected in the 1945 NFL draft by the Detroit Lions (31st round, 321st overall) but never played in the National Football League.

== BAA career statistics ==
Legend
GP	Games played
FG%	Field-goal percentage
FT%	Free-throw percentage
APG	Assists per game
PPG	Points per game

=== Regular season ===
Year	Team	GP	FG%	FT%	APG	PPG
1947–48	Chicago	37	.198	.769	.2	1.5
Career		37	.198	.769	.2	1.5

=== Playoffs ===
Year	Team	GP	FG%	FT%	APG	PPG
1948	Chicago	4	.217	.000	.3	2.5
Career		4	.217	.000	.3	2.5
