= Paul Huston (basketball) =

American basketball player

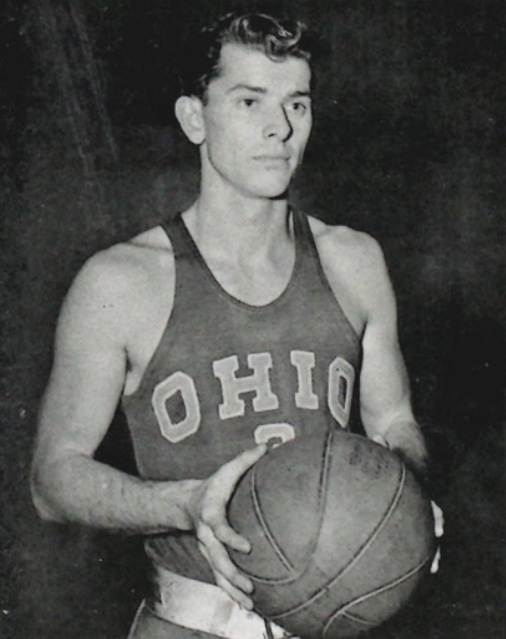
- Huston from the 1946 Makio

Personal information
- Born: June 2, 1925 Xenia, Ohio, U.S.
- Died: February 2, 1992 (aged 66)
- Listed height: 6 ft 3 in (1.91 m)
- Listed weight: 175 lb (79 kg)

Career information
- High school: Xenia (Xenia, Ohio)
- College: Ohio State (1943–1947)
- BAA draft: 1947: 1st round, 8th overall pick
- Drafted by: Chicago Stags
- Playing career: 1947–1948
- Position: Forward
- Number: 3

Career history
- 1947–1948: Chicago Stags

Career highlights
- First-team All-American – Helms (1946); Third-team All-American – Converse (1946)

Career BAA statistics
- Points: 164 (3.6 ppg)
- Games: 46
- Stats at NBA.com
- Stats at Basketball Reference

Paul Fremont "Shad" Huston (June 2, 1925 – February 2, 1992) was an American professional basketball player. Huston was the eighth overall pick in the 1947 BAA draft by the Chicago Stags. He played for one season in the league and averaged 3.6 points per game.

== BAA career statistics ==
Legend
GP	Games played
FG%	Field-goal percentage
FT%	Free-throw percentage
APG	Assists per game
PPG	Points per game

=== Regular season ===
Year	Team	GP	FG%	FT%	APG	PPG
1947–48	Chicago	46	.237	.697	0.6	3.6
Career		46	.237	.697	0.6	3.6

=== Playoffs ===
Year	Team	GP	FG%	FT%	APG	PPG
1948	Chicago	5	.158	.538	0.4	2.6
Career		5	.158	.538	0.4	2.6
