= Bill Davis (basketball) =

American basketball player

Personal information
- Born: October 3, 1921 Wisconsin, U.S.
- Died: November 30, 1975 (aged 54)
- Listed height: 6 ft 3 in (1.91 m)
- Listed weight: 215 lb (98 kg)

Career information
- College: Notre Dame (1942–1943)
- Playing career: 1946–1948
- Position: Forward
- Number: 3

Career history
- 1946–1947: Chicago Stags
- 1947–1948: Grand Rapids Rangers
- Stats at NBA.com
- Stats at Basketball Reference

William F. Davis (October 3, 1921 – November 30, 1975) was an American professional basketball player. He played one season in the Basketball Association of America (BAA) with the Chicago Stags during the 1946–47 season. He attended the University of Notre Dame.

== BAA career statistics ==
Legend
GP	Games played
FG%	Field-goal percentage
FT%	Free-throw percentage
APG	Assists per game
PPG	Points per game

=== Regular season ===
Year	Team	GP	FG%	FT%	APG	PPG
1946–47	Chicago	47	.240	.341	.2	1.8
Career		47	.240	.341	.2	1.8

=== Playoffs ===
Year	Team	GP	FG%	FT%	APG	PPG
1947	Chicago	7	.143	.400	.0	.9
Career		7	.143	.400	.0	.9
