= Wibs Kautz =

American basketball player

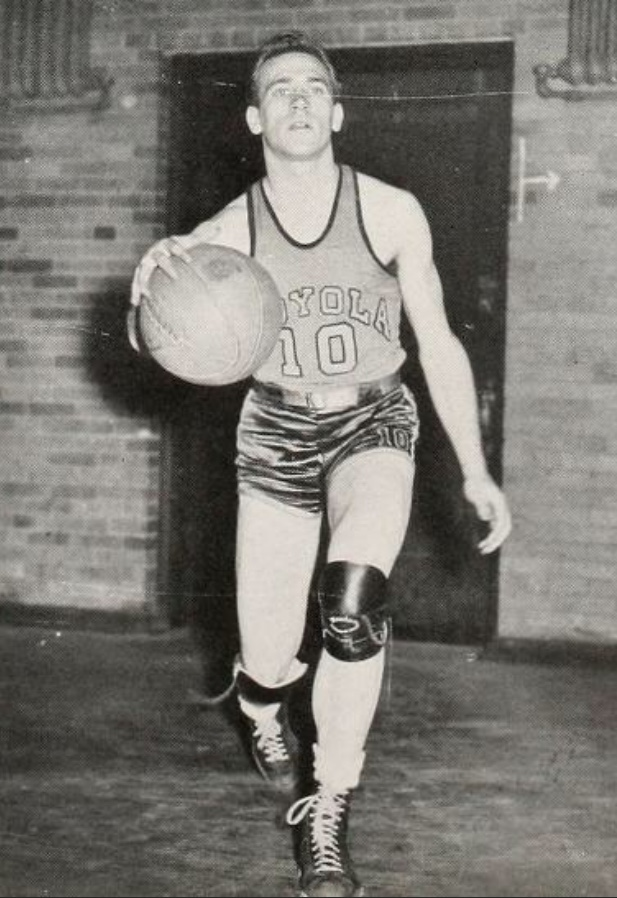
- Kautz from the 1937 Loyolan

Personal information
- Born: September 7, 1915 Chicago, Illinois
- Died: May 1979 (aged 63) Worth, Illinois
- Listed height: 6 ft 0 in (1.83 m)
- Listed weight: 180 lb (82 kg)

Career information
- High school: Tilden (Chicago, Illinois)
- College: Loyola Chicago (1936–1939)
- Playing career: 1939–1947
- Position: Guard / forward
- Number: 12

Career history
- 1939–1942: Chicago Bruins
- 1945–1946: Baltimore Bullets
- 1946–1947: Chicago Stags
- 1947–1948: Grand Rapids Rangers

Career highlights
- All-NBL First Team (1940); All-NBL Second Team (1941); Second-team All-American – Converse (1939)
- Stats at NBA.com
- Stats at Basketball Reference

Wilbert "Wibs" Kautz (September 7, 1915 – May 1979) was an American professional basketball player. He spent three seasons in the National Basketball League (NBL) and one season in the Basketball Association of America (BAA). His career in the NBL began during the 1939–40 season through the 1941–42 season all spent as a member of the Chicago Bruins. His one season in the BAA was spent on the Chicago Stags 1946–47 roster. He attended Loyola University Chicago.

== BAA career statistics ==
Legend
| GP | Games played |
| FG% | Field-goal percentage |
| FT% | Free-throw percentage |
| APG | Assists per game |
| PPG | Points per game |

=== Regular season ===
| Year | Team | GP | FG% | FT% | APG | PPG |
|---|---|---|---|---|---|---|
| 1946–47 | Chicago | 50 | .255 | .534 | .7 | 5.1 |
| Career | | 50 | .255 | .534 | .7 | 5.1 |

=== Playoffs ===
| Year | Team | GP | FG% | FT% | APG | PPG |
|---|---|---|---|---|---|---|
| 1946–47 | Chicago | 9 | .222 | .333 | .0 | 2.4 |
| Career | | 9 | .222 | .333 | .0 | 2.4 |
