= Charles Sydnor =

Charles Sydnor may refer to:

- Charles S. Sydnor (1898–1954), professor and author of American history
- Charles W. Sydnor Jr. (1943 – 2025), Holocaust and World War II historian
- Charles E. Sydnor III (born 1974), American politician in Maryland
