= Gene Rock =

American basketball player

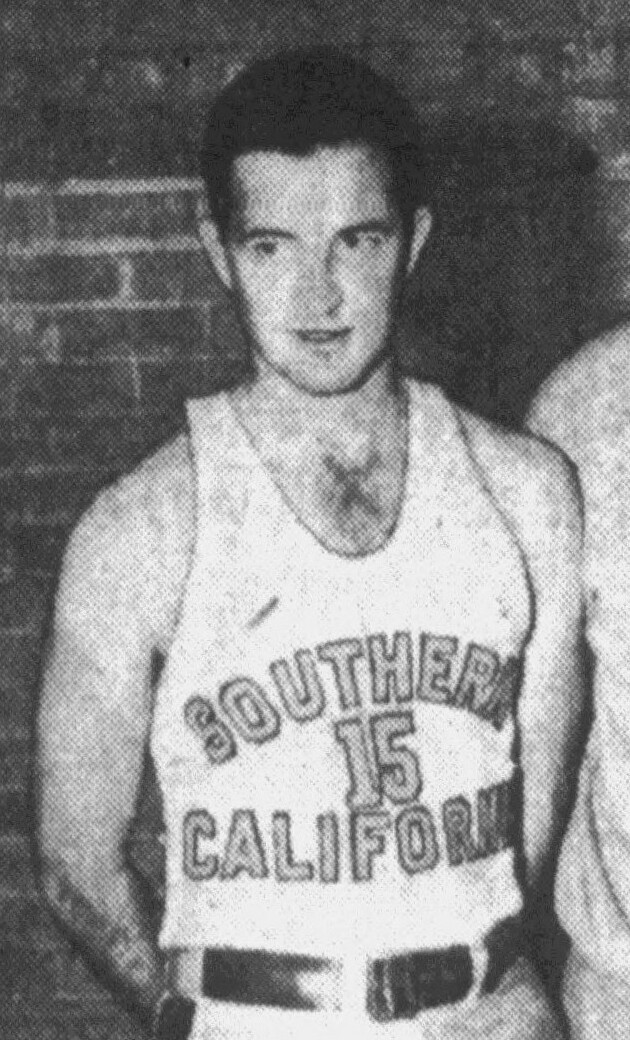
- Rock, circa 1947

Personal information
- Born: November 4, 1921 Caruthers, California, U.S.
- Died: October 31, 2002 (aged 80) San Diego, California, U.S.
- Listed height: 5 ft 9 in (1.75 m)
- Listed weight: 155 lb (70 kg)

Career information
- High school: Huntington Park (Huntington Park, California)
- College: USC (1941–1943, 1946–1947)
- BAA draft: 1947: undrafted
- Playing career: 1947–1948
- Position: Guard
- Number: 15

Career history
- 1947: Birmingham Skyhawks
- 1947–1948: Chicago Stags

Career highlights
- Consensus second-team All-American (1943); All-PCC (1943)

Career BAA statistics
- Points: 10 (0.9 ppg)
- Assists: 0 (0.0 apg)
- Games played: 11
- Stats at NBA.com
- Stats at Basketball Reference

Eugene O. Rock (November 4, 1921 – October 31, 2002) was an American professional basketball player who played in the Professional Basketball League of America (PBLA) and the Basketball Association of America (BAA) during the 1947–48 season. A native of Huntington Park, California, Rock attended Huntington Park High School before enrolling at the University of Southern California to play basketball. While at USC, Rock earned varsity letters in 1942, 1943 and 1947. Like many male college athletes during his day, Rock served in the military for two years before finishing college; he attained the rank of Captain in the Marine Corps. Rock led the Trojans in scoring during 1942–43 (12.6 points per game) and again in 1946–47 (11.1 ppg). During the former season, USC finished with a then-school record 23–5 mark en route to winning the Pacific Coast League Southern Division title. Rock was also a teammate of future College Basketball Hall of Fame coaches Alex Hannum and Tex Winter.

After his college career ended, Rock played for the Birmingham Skyhawks in the PBLA, which was a professional basketball league that lasted for less than one full season due to underfunding. He averaged 6.9 points per game in seven games before the league folded. Rock then signed with the Chicago Stags of the BAA. In 11 games played, he averaged 0.9 points. His basketball career ended after the season, and Rock worked for the Los Angeles Police Department where he became a captain. He served in the vice squad, Hollywood division. Rock retired in 1979 and lived the rest of his life in the San Diego area. On October 31, 2002, he succumbed to cancer.

== BAA career statistics ==
Legend
GP	Games played
FG%	Field-goal percentage
FT%	Free-throw percentage
APG	Assists per game
PPG	Points per game

=== Regular season ===
Year	Team	GP	FG%	FT%	APG	PPG
1947–48	Chicago	11	.222	.500	.0	.9
Career		11	.222	.500	.0	.9

=== Playoffs ===
Year	Team	GP	FG%	FT%	APG	PPG
1948	Chicago	2	.000	.000	.0	.0
Career		2	.000	.000	.0	.0

== See also ==
- List of shortest players in National Basketball Association history
