= Jim Seminoff =

American basketball player

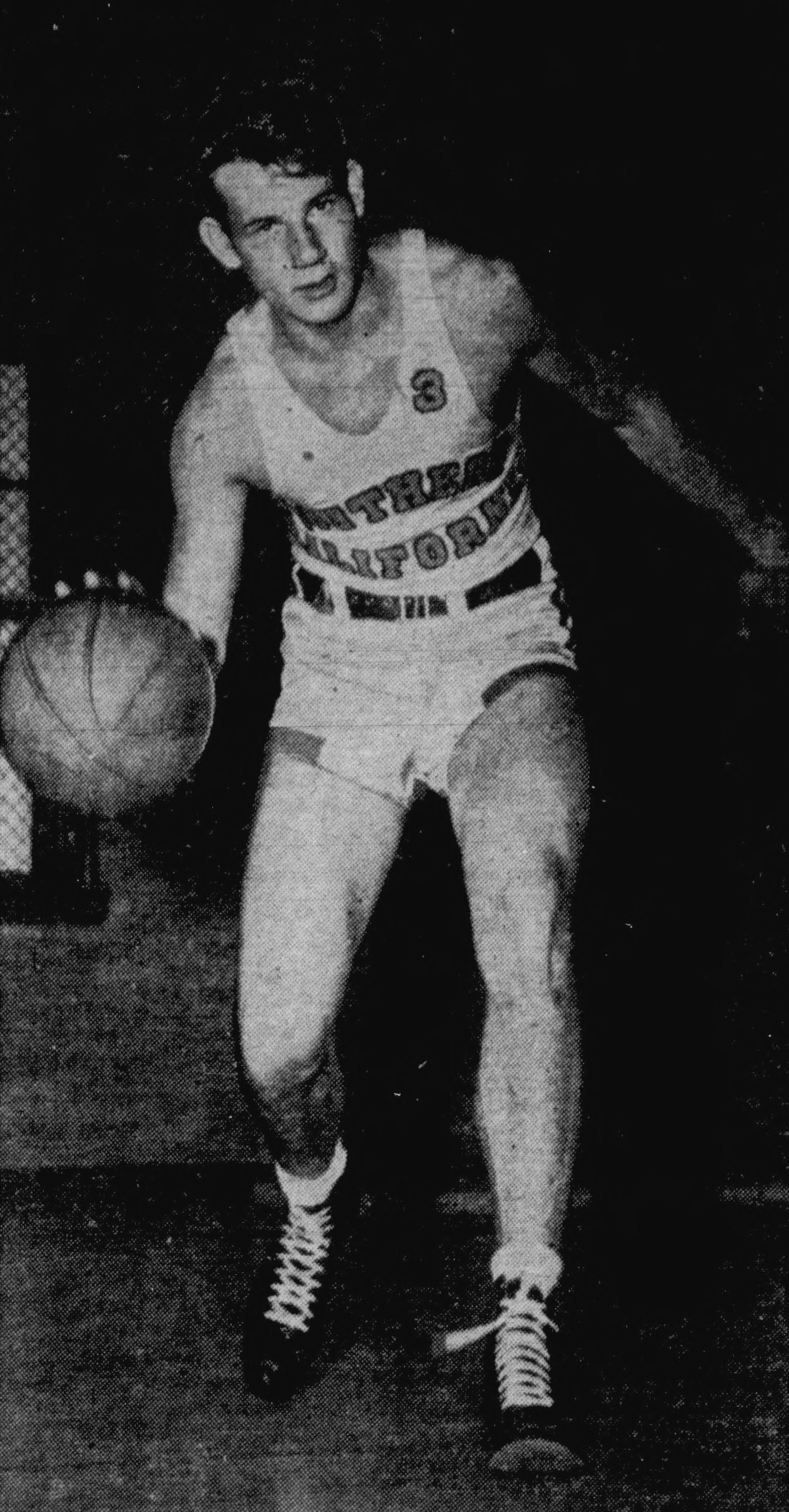
- Seminoff, circa 1941–42

Personal information
- Born: September 1, 1922 Los Angeles, California, U.S.
- Died: June 12, 2001 (aged 78) San Clemente, California, U.S.
- Listed height: 6 ft 2 in (1.88 m)
- Listed weight: 190 lb (86 kg)

Career information
- High school: Roosevelt (Los Angeles, California)
- College: USC (1940–1943)
- Position: Shooting guard / small forward
- Number: 5, 18, 15

Career history
- 1946–1948: Chicago Stags
- 1948–1950: Boston Celtics

Career highlights
- First-team All-PCC (1943)
- Stats at NBA.com
- Stats at Basketball Reference

James Jack Seminoff (September 1, 1922 – June 12, 2001) was an American professional basketball player.

A 6'2" guard / forward from the University of Southern California, Seminoff earned first-team All-PCC in 1943. He played four seasons (1946–1950) in the Basketball Association of America as a member of the Chicago Stags and Boston Celtics. He averaged 6.5 points per game in his career.

== BAA/NBA career statistics ==
Legend
GP	Games played	FG%	Field-goal percentage
FT%	Free-throw percentage	APG	Assists per game
PPG	Points per game	**Bold**	Career high

=== Regular season ===
Year	Team	GP	FG%	FT%	APG	PPG
1946–47	Chicago	60	**.314**	.546	1.1	7.3
1947–48	Chicago	48	.297	.695	1.9	6.2
1948–49	Boston	58	**.314**	.689	**3.9**	**7.9**
1949–50	Boston	**65**	.300	**.755**	3.8	4.8
Career		231	.308	.681	2.7	6.5

=== Playoffs ===
Year	Team	GP	FG%	FT%	APG	PPG
1947	Chicago	**11**	.235	**.684**	.7	6.8
1948	Chicago	5	**.258**	.654	**1.6**	**9.8**
Career		16	.242	.667	1.0	7.8
