= 1946–47 Chicago Stags season =

- Division champions
- Head coach: Harold Olsen
- Owner: Arthur Wirtz
- Arena: Chicago Stadium

Results
- Record: 39–22 (.639)
- Place: Division: 1st (Western)
- Playoff finish: Lost BAA Finals to Warriors 1–4

Local media
- Television: WBKB
- Radio: WIND (AM)

The 1946–47 Chicago Stags season was the first season of the Chicago Stags of the Basketball Association of America (BAA/NBA). Before this season even began, the Chicago Stags were originally meant to start out as the Chicago Atomics, to the point of even playing an exhibition game against the New York Knicks under that moniker before they later played as the Chicago Basketball Club, Inc. for one more exhibition game before they officially became the Chicago Stags for the rest of their existence onward. Despite the tumultuous start with the team name in mind, the Stags would still finish with the best record in the Western Division with a 39–22 record (which was good enough for the second-best record in the BAA that season behind only the Washington Capitols in the Eastern Division), later reaching as far as the inaugural BAA/NBA Finals series, where they would ultimately lose to the Philadelphia Warriors (now known as the Golden State Warriors) 4–1. Despite their successful results as a team, they were initially undecided about whether they would play for another season or not due to their failure to gain any profits and traction over competing championship basketball events going on at around the same time as the 1947 BAA playoffs and 1947 BAA Finals within the city of Chicago with the Chicago American Gears of the rivaling National Basketball League (NBL) competing against the Rochester Royals (now Sacramento Kings) in the 1947 NBL Finals (which the American Gears later won 3–1) and the 1947 World Professional Basketball Tournament (WPBT) (which ended with the NBL's Indianapolis Kautskys (later Indianapolis Jets of the BAA) stunning everyone in the entire event that year after many years of failing to win a single game in the WPBT) despite initially thinking the Stags could at least co-exist with the American Gears akin to the Cubs and White Sox co-existing in the MLB, though they ultimately would decide to stay in the BAA once they heard that the inner city rivaling Chicago American Gears were leaving the NBL to create a short-lived, yet very ambitious rivaling league of their own called the Professional Basketball League of America (with that decision also causing issues for the WPBT in what later became its final year of tournament play as well). The Stags ultimately stayed in the BAA/NBA for four years before later suddenly folding operations with little warning on September 25, 1950, due to new ownership and monetary issues; the Stags are currently one of three BAA/NBA teams that folded operations to have made it to a BAA/NBA Finals championship series alongside the original Baltimore Bullets ABL/BAA/NBA franchise in 1948 and the Washington Capitols in 1949. Greater details on their first season would be explored in Charley Rosen's book called "The First Tip-Off: The Incredible Story of the Birth of the NBA", with an entire chapter dedicated to the Stags' first season in the BAA alongside the various highs and lows (mostly highs) that would eventually lead them to their eventual downfall as a franchise.

== Roster ==
Due to this being the first season in the franchise's history, the BAA didn't utilize a draft system like they would in future seasons of the BAA/NBA and instead relied upon some combination of the head coach and the general manager of the team finding and signing players in time to start out their training camp period for the season. For the Stags, head coach Harold Olsen and team owner Arthur Wirtz agreed to utilize a college basketball style of game play for their team, with quickness and finesse being utilized over brute force, an up-tempo game-plan being preferable to a grind-it-out pace of game, and fresh faces with young legs being more valuable than stubborn, jaded veteran players. Because of that agreed upon philosophy in mind, Olsen would recruit a mixture of local and nearby talents for fans to grab onto (like Mickey Rottner and Wibs Kautz from Loyola University Chicago and Don Carlson and Tony Jaros from the nearby University of Minnesota), talented West coast military basketball players (Jim Seminoff from the University of Southern California, Chet Carlisle from the University of California, and Chuck Gilmur from the University of Washington), and other players that would interest Olsen for one reason or another (Bill Davis from the University of Notre Dame, Doyle Parrack from the 1945 NCAA champion University of Oklahoma A&M team, Chick Halbert from West Texas State Teachers College, and Max Zaslofsky from St. John's University) in order to open up their first ever season of play.

1946–47 Chicago Stags roster
Players

Pos.	No.	Player	Height	Weight	DOB	From
F/C	16	Chet Carlisle	6 ft 5 in (1.96 m)	195 lb (88 kg)	1916-11-02	California
G/F	15	Don Carlson	6 ft 0 in (1.83 m)	170 lb (77 kg)	1919-03-22	Minnesota
F	3	Bill Davis	6 ft 3 in (1.91 m)	215 lb (98 kg)	1921-10-03	Notre Dame
F/C	17	Chuck Gilmur	6 ft 4 in (1.93 m)	225 lb (102 kg)	1922-08-13	Washington
C	22	Chick Halbert	6 ft 9 in (2.06 m)	225 lb (102 kg)	1919-02-27	West Texas A&M
G/F	26	Tony Jaros	6 ft 3 in (1.91 m)	185 lb (84 kg)	1920-02-22	Minnesota
G/F	12	Wilbert Kautz	6 ft 0 in (1.83 m)	180 lb (82 kg)	1915-09-07	Loyola Chicago
G/F	8	Doyle Parrack	6 ft 0 in (1.83 m)	165 lb (75 kg)	1921-12-06	Oklahoma State
G	6	Mickey Rottner	5 ft 10 in (1.78 m)	180 lb (82 kg)	1919-03-23	Loyola Chicago
G/F	5	Jim Seminoff	6 ft 2 in (1.88 m)	190 lb (86 kg)	1922-09-01	USC
G	10	Max Zaslofsky	6 ft 2 in (1.88 m)	170 lb (77 kg)	1925-12-07	St. John's

Coaches
Head coach
- Harold Olsen
Assistant(s)
- Philip Brownstein

Legend
- (DP) Unsigned draft pick
- (FA) Free agent
- (S) Suspended
- Injured

Roster

== Regular season ==
=== Season standings ===
#	Western Division				
#	Team	W	L	PCT	GB
1	x-Chicago Stags	39	22	.639	–
2	x-St. Louis Bombers	38	23	.623	1
3	x-Cleveland Rebels	30	30	.500	8.5
4	Detroit Falcons	20	40	.333	18.5
5	Pittsburgh Ironmen	15	45	.250	23.5

=== Game log ===
1946–47 game log
Total: 39–22
November

Game	Date	Team	Score	High points	Location Attendance	Record
1	November 2	New York	W 63–47	Max Zaslofsky (18)		1–0
2	November 5	@ Boston	W 57–55	Max Zaslofsky (28)		2–0
3	November 7	@ Providence	L 65–73	Doyle Parrack (14)		2–1
4	November 9	Toronto	W 62–54	Chick Halbert (23)		3–1
5	November 11	@ New York	W 78–68 (OT)	Mickey Rottner (20)		4–1
6	November 13	Boston	W 71–61	Max Zaslofsky (16)		5–1
7	November 16	Washington	L 65–73	Chick Halbert (19)		5–2
8	November 17	@ Cleveland	W 78–76	Chick Halbert (22)		6–2
9	November 20	@ New York	L 69–72	Tony Jaros (20)		6–3
10	November 21	@ Philadelphia	W 65–63	Doyle Parrack (15)		7–3
11	November 24	Detroit	L 55–68	Tony Jaros (13)		7–4
12	November 27	@ Washington	L 67–75	Max Zaslofsky (22)		7–5
13	November 28	St. Louis	L 72–75	Max Zaslofsky (19)		7–6

December

Game	Date	Team	Score	High points	Location Attendance	Record
14	December 1	Boston	W 66–56	Chick Halbert (29)		8–6
15	December 4	@ Pittsburgh	W 57–46	Chick Halbert (15)		9–6
16	December 5	Toronto	L 61–65	Max Zaslofsky (22)		9–7
17	December 7	Cleveland	W 86–78	Max Zaslofsky (20)		10–7
18	December 11	Cleveland	W 88–79	Chick Halbert (14)		11–7
19	December 12	@ St. Louis	W 88–68	Don Carlson (28)		12–7
20	December 15	Pittsburgh	W 84–75	Max Zaslofsky (14)		13–7
21	December 19	@ Providence	L 77–81	Max Zaslofsky (16)		13–8
22	December 22	Detroit	W 95–92	Don Carlson (26)		14–8
23	December 27	@ Toronto	W 88–80	Tony Jaros (16)		15–8
24	December 29	@ Cleveland	W 87–79 (OT)	Max Zaslofsky (20)		16–8
25	December 31	@ Toronto	L 76–86	Tony Jaros (22)		16–9

January

Game	Date	Team	Score	High points	Location Attendance	Record
26	January 1	St. Louis	L 90–103	Jaros, Seminoff (20)		16–10
27	January 8	@ Detroit	W 83–80	Don Carlson (18)		17–10
28	January 9	@ St. Louis	L 81–84	Chick Halbert (17)		17–11
29	January 12	Philadelphia	W 75–72	Jim Seminoff (20)		18–11
30	January 15	@ Detroit	L 59–68	Doyle Parrack (12)		18–12
31	January 16	@ Philadelphia	W 84–78	Max Zaslofsky (19)		19–12
32	January 18	@ Washington	L 72–87	Max Zaslofsky (21)		19–13
33	January 20	@ Boston	W 81–54	Max Zaslofsky (21)		20–13
34	January 22	@ New York	L 64–74	Don Carlson (12)		20–14
35	January 23	Providence	W 97–76	Mickey Rottner (20)		21–14
36	January 26	Philadelphia	W 63–57	Davis, Zaslofsky (12)		22–14

February

Game	Date	Team	Score	High points	Location Attendance	Record
37	February 2	Toronto	W 90–75	Mickey Rottner (22)		23–14
38	February 6	Pittsburgh	W 109–85	Max Zaslofsky (17)		24–14
39	February 9	Washington	W 85–67	Don Carlson (23)		25–14
40	February 12	@ Pittsburgh	W 101–82	Don Carlson (24)		26–14
41	February 13	Providence	W 81–79	Don Carlson (20)		27–14
42	February 16	Boston	W 84–77	Chet Carlisle (16)		28–14
43	February 20	Detroit	L 74–76	Don Carlson (18)		28–15
44	February 21	@ St. Louis	L 60–65	Don Carlson (20)		28–16
45	February 23	New York	W 82–68	Max Zaslofsky (22)		29–16
46	February 26	@ Detroit	W 72–68	Max Zaslofsky (20)		30–16

March

Game	Date	Team	Score	High points	Location Attendance	Record
47	March 2	St. Louis	W 98–86	Max Zaslofsky (32)		31–16
48	March 3	@ Pittsburgh	W 69–66	Chick Halbert (19)		32–16
49	March 6	Pittsburgh	W 72–71	Max Zaslofsky (19)		33–16
50	March 8	Providence	W 107–81	Tony Jaros (20)		34–16
51	March 9	@ Cleveland	W 107–78	Chick Halbert (25)		35–16
52	March 13	Washington	L 69–86	Max Zaslofsky (15)		35–17
53	March 14	Philadelphia	W 70–67	Max Zaslofsky (16)		36–17
54	March 19	New York	L 57–65	Don Carlson (15)		36–18
55	March 21	@ Toronto	W 99–83	Chick Halbert (25)		37–18
56	March 22	Cleveland	L 58–67	Max Zaslofsky (19)		37–19
57	March 24	@ Boston	W 80–69	Chick Halbert (24)		38–19
58	March 26	@ Washington	L 77–105	Chick Halbert (15)		38–20
59	March 27	@ Philadelphia	L 73–80	Chick Halbert (18)		38–21
60	March 29	@ Providence	L 79–83	Tony Jaros (17)		38–22
61	March 31	St. Louis	W 73–66 (OT)	Chick Halbert (19)		39–22

== BAA Playoffs ==
=== BAA Semifinals ===
(E1) Washington Capitols vs. (W1) Chicago Stags: Stags win series 4-2

- Game 1 @ Washington (April 2): Chicago 81, Washington 65
- Game 2 @ Washington (April 3): Chicago 69, Washington 53
- Game 3 @ Chicago (April 8): Chicago 67, Washington 55
- Game 4 @ Washington (April 10): Washington 76, Chicago 69
- Game 5 @ Chicago (April 12): Washington 67, Chicago 55
- Game 6 @ Chicago (April 13): Chicago 66, Washington 61

=== BAA Finals ===
Despite the Stags looking like they should have home court advantage this series due to them having the better record this series, they would not end up having it due to their home venue hosting a circus at the time, with later venue scheduling issues causing them to lose out on the rest of the potential home games they might have had after Game 4 was played.

(E2) Philadelphia Warriors vs. (W1) Chicago Stags: Warriors win series 4-1

- Game 1 @ Philadelphia (April 16): Philadelphia 84, Chicago 71
- Game 2 @ Philadelphia (April 17): Philadelphia 85, Chicago 74
- Game 3 @ Chicago (April 19): Philadelphia 75, Chicago 72
- Game 4 @ Chicago (April 20): Chicago 74, Philadelphia 73
- Game 5 @ Philadelphia (April 22): Philadelphia 83, Chicago 80

== Season losses ==
Throughout this season, the Chicago Stags only had an average total of 2,346 paid attendees per game, with net receipts totaling up to $93,951 for the season and estimated losses totaling up to around $160,000 for this season. However, because of the uncertain future involved with the BAA between the high number of teams with lost revenue this season and the high amount of competition the Stags had to deal with during their playoff run between the rivaling National Basketball League's Chicago American Gears and the 1947 World Professional Basketball Tournament both competing and operating at the same time as the Stags during their run in the 1947 BAA playoffs, the Stags would join the Toronto Huskies as one of two teams to become undecided on whether they would end up playing for another season or not. With that being said, unlike the Huskies, who ended up folding alongside the Pittsburgh Ironmen following their entries in the inaugural 1947 BAA draft, the Stags would continue playing for a few more seasons following the reveal that the Chicago American Gears would create their own rivaling (albeit short-lived) professional basketball league called the Professional Basketball League of America (thus getting rid of a significant rivaling source of income for the Stags in future seasons), including the first official season of the National Basketball Association when the BAA merged operations with the older NBL to become the NBA, before folding operations for good by the 1950 offseason period due to ownership and monetary issues after the new team owner, Abe Saperstein, planned on renaming the team to the Chicago Bruins for the 1950–51 NBA season. Chicago would be the last BAA team to fold operations during the offseason period, though not the last BAA team to fold operations entirely due to the Washington Capitols folding operations while playing in the 1950–51 NBA season.
