= Chet Carlisle =

American basketball player

Personal information
- Born: November 2, 1916 Crowley, Louisiana, U.S.
- Died: August 3, 1988 (aged 71)
- Listed height: 6 ft 5 in (1.96 m)
- Listed weight: 195 lb (88 kg)

Career information
- High school: Pomona (Pomona, California)
- College: California (1935–1938)
- Playing career: 1946–1947
- Position: Power forward / center
- Number: 16

Career history
- 1946–1947: Chicago Stags
- Stats at NBA.com
- Stats at Basketball Reference

Chester Gray Carlisle (November 2, 1916 – August 3, 1988) was an American professional basketball player. He played collegiately for the California Golden Bears. Carlisle played for the Chicago Stags of the Basketball Association of America (BAA) for 51 games during the 1946–47 season.

== BAA career statistics ==
Legend
GP	Games played
FG%	Field-goal percentage
FT%	Free-throw percentage
APG	Assists per game
PPG	Points per game

=== Regular season ===
Year	Team	GP	FG%	FT%	APG	PPG
1946–47	Chicago	51	.268	.609	.3	5.0
Career		51	.268	.609	.3	5.0

=== Playoffs ===
Year	Team	GP	FG%	FT%	APG	PPG
1946–47	Chicago	10	.227	.571	.2	5.6
Career		10	.227	.571	.2	5.6
