= Tony Jaros =

American basketball player

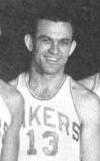
- Jaros with the Los Angeles Lakers, c. 1950

Personal information
- Born: February 22, 1920 Minneapolis, Minnesota, U.S.
- Died: April 22, 1995 (aged 75)
- Listed height: 6 ft 3 in (1.91 m)
- Listed weight: 185 lb (84 kg)

Career information
- High school: Edison (Minneapolis, Minnesota)
- College: Minnesota (1942–1946)
- Playing career: 1946–1951
- Position: Small forward / shooting guard
- Number: 26, 13

Career history
- 1946–1947: Chicago Stags
- 1947–1951: Minneapolis Lakers

Career highlights
- 2× BAA/NBA champion (1949, 1950); NBL champion (1948); Third-team All-American – Helms (1946)
- Stats at NBA.com
- Stats at Basketball Reference

Anthony Joseph Jaros (February 22, 1920 – April 22, 1995) was an American professional basketball player. He won three championships with the Minneapolis Lakers: the NBL championship in 1948, the BAA championship in 1949 and the NBA championship in 1950.

A 6-foot-3-inch (1.91 m) forward/guard from the University of Minnesota, Jaros played four seasons (1946–1947; 1948–1951) in the Basketball Association of America/National Basketball Association as a member of the Chicago Stags and Minneapolis Lakers. He averaged 5.4 points per game in his BAA/NBA career and won two league championships with the Lakers. He also spent one season in the National Basketball League with the Lakers (1947–1948), winning the NBL title that season.

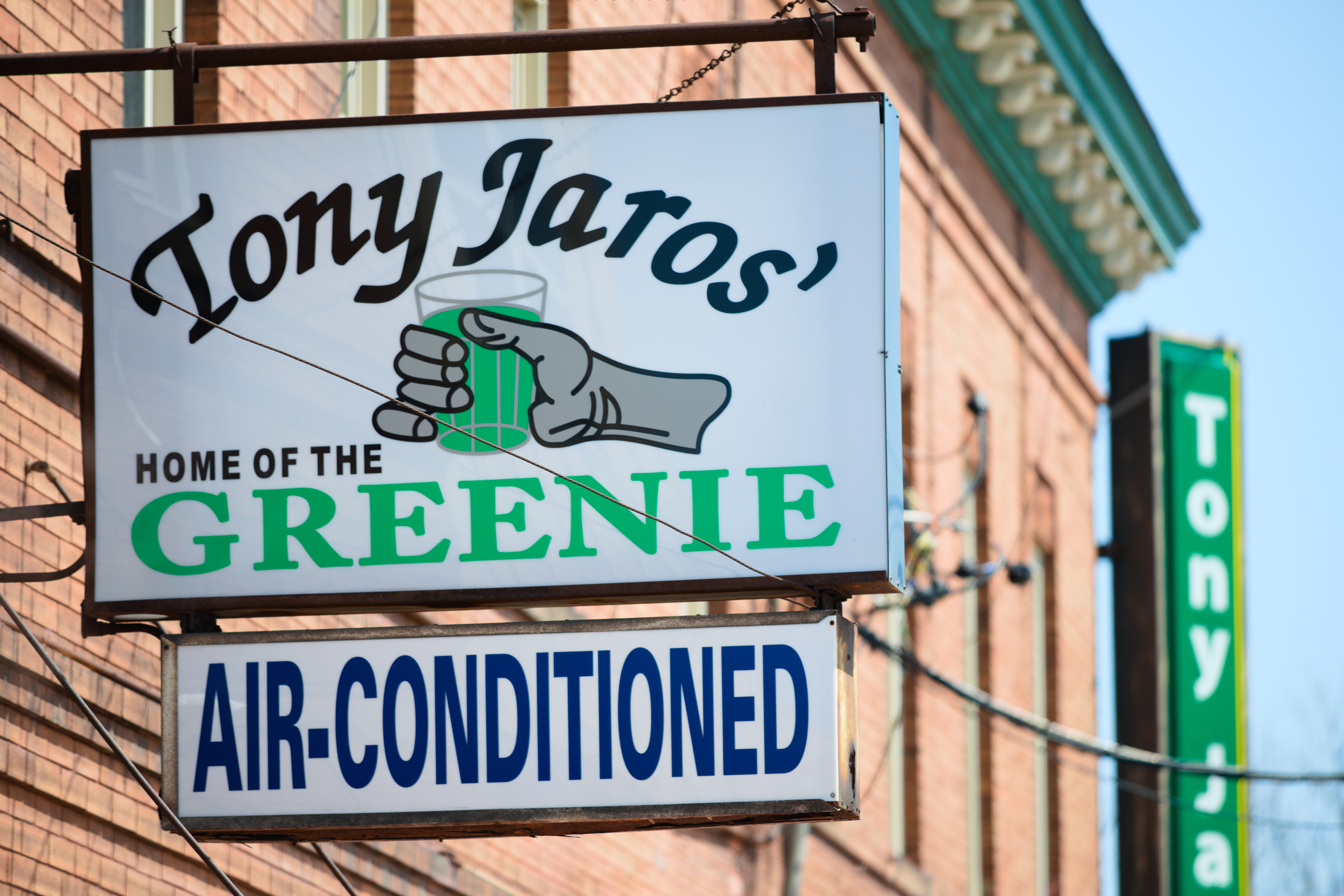
Jaros' bar, the Tony Jaros' River Garden, in Northeast Minneapolis

Jaros went to Edison High School in Northeast Minneapolis, and later owned a well-known bar in that neighborhood that bears his name to this day. Tony Jaros' River Garden bar is home of the "Greenie," a very strong lime-flavored drink made with vodka. The drink was invented more than 50 years ago, and was originally sold informally at softball games by Jaros' son Tommy. During the COVID-19 pandemic, the bar began selling "make-your-own-Greenie" kits for customers to make at home during lockdown when the bar was closed. The kits have continued as a St. Patrick's Day offering. The bar has several photos of Jaros, as well as one of his last NBA pension checks, framed on the wall.

== BAA/NBA career statistics ==
Legend
GP	Games played	GS	Games started	MPG	Minutes per game
FG%	Field goal percentage	3P%	3-point field goal percentage	FT%	Free throw percentage
RPG	Rebounds per game	APG	Assists per game	SPG	Steals per game
BPG	Blocks per game	PPG	Points per game	**Bold**	Career high
†	Won an NBA championship

=== Regular season ===
Year	Team	GP	FG%	FT%	RPG	APG	PPG
1946–47	Chicago	59	.289	.707	–	.5	**8.2**
1948–49†	Minneapolis	59	**.343**	.718	–	1.0	5.8
1949–50†	Minneapolis	61	.291	**.750**	–	1.0	3.9
1950–51	Minneapolis	**63**	.307	.631	**2.1**	**1.1**	3.8
Career		242	.306	.702	2.1	.9	5.4

=== Playoffs ===
Year	Team	GP	FG%	FT%	RPG	APG	PPG
1946–47	Chicago	**11**	.265	.710	–	.4	**9.3**
1948–49†	Minneapolis	10	**.357**	**.783**	–	**1.1**	5.8
1949–50†	Minneapolis	2	.000	.500	–	.0	.5
1950–51	Minneapolis	7	.300	.727	**1.0**	.9	2.9
Career		30	.287	.731	1.0	.7	6.0
