= Doyle Parrack =

American basketball player-coach (1921–2008)

Biographical details
- Born: December 6, 1921; Cotton County, Oklahoma, U.S.
- Died: September 5, 2008 (aged 86); Perkins, Oklahoma, U.S.

Playing career
- 1943–1946: Oklahoma A&M
- 1946–1947: Chicago Stags

Coaching career (HC unless noted)
- 1947–1955: Oklahoma City
- 1955–1962: Oklahoma
- 1978–1980: Oklahoma (women's)

Head coaching record
- Overall: 208–178
- Tournaments: 1–5 (NCAA)

Doyle Kenneth Parrack (December 6, 1921 – September 5, 2008) was an American professional basketball player and coach.

Parrack was born in Cotton County, Oklahoma, and played basketball at Connors Jr. College and Oklahoma A&M University, where the Aggies under coach Henry Iba won an NCAA Championship in 1945. He coached at Shawnee (OK) High School for one year and compiled a 15–12 record. He then returned to the court and played one season of professional basketball for the Chicago Stags of the NBA. Parrack was hired as coach at Oklahoma City University in 1947 and transformed the program from a club team without a campus gymnasium into a national powerhouse. He eventually led the Chiefs to four consecutive NCAA tournament appearances.

In 1955 he accepted the position as head coach of the University of Oklahoma. In 1959 he was named Conference Coach of the Year. In 1962 Parrack returned to his alma mater, where he worked with Coach Iba as an assistant until Iba retired in 1970. Two years later he was hired to build the Israeli national basketball team, and took his team to the playoffs in Germany that same year. In 1978 through 1980 Parrack served as head coach in the University of Oklahoma women's program.

After retiring as an active coach, Parrack served as a probation officer for the Oklahoma City Juvenile Bureau. He was inducted into the Oklahoma City University Sports Hall of Fame and the Oklahoma State University Athletics Hall of Honor and was recognized by Oklahoma City University when the clock tower at the Meinder's School of Business was named in his honor.

Parrack died on September 5, 2008, at his home in Perkins, Oklahoma, at age 86.

Parrack's daughter, Linda Livingstone, played basketball at Oklahoma State University after it was renamed from Oklahoma A&M. A business management professional and academic, Livingstone was named president of Baylor University in 2017. She has been the chair of the NCAA Board of Governors and the Big 12 Conference Board of Directors.

== BAA career statistics ==
Legend
GP	Games played
FG%	Field-goal percentage
FT%	Free-throw percentage
APG	Assists per game
PPG	Points per game

=== Regular season ===
Year	Team	GP	FG%	FT%	APG	PPG
1946–47	Chicago	58	.266	.650	.3	4.7
Career		58	.266	.650	.3	4.7

=== Playoffs ===
Year	Team	GP	FG%	FT%	APG	PPG
1946–47	Chicago	7	.000	1.000	.1	.4
Career		7	.000	1.000	.1	.4

== Head coaching record ==
=== Men's college basketball ===
Record table
Season	Team	Overall	Conference	Standing	Postseason
Oklahoma City Chiefs (Independent) (1947–1955)
1947–48	Oklahoma City	18–13			
1948–49	Oklahoma City	20–6			
1949–50	Oklahoma City	19–9			
1950–51	Oklahoma City	16–14			
1951–52	Oklahoma City	19–8			NCAA first round
1952–53	Oklahoma City	18–6			NCAA Sweet Sixteen
1953–54	Oklahoma City	18–7			NCAA first round
1954–55	Oklahoma City	9–18			NCAA first round
Oklahoma City:		137–81 (.628)			
Oklahoma Sooners (Big Seven / Big Eight Conference) (1955–1962)
1955–56	Oklahoma	4–19	1–11	7th	
1956–57	Oklahoma	8–15	3–9	7th	
1957–58	Oklahoma	13–10	5–7	T–4th	
1958–59	Oklahoma	15–10	9–5	2nd	
1959–60	Oklahoma	14–11	9–5	3rd	
1960–61	Oklahoma	10–15	2–12	7th	
1961–62	Oklahoma	7–17	5–9	T–5th	
Oklahoma:		71–97 (.423)	34–58 (.370)		
Total:		208–178 (.539)			

=== Women's college basketball ===
Record table
Season	Team	Overall	Conference	Standing	Postseason
Oklahoma Sooners (Independent) (1978–1980)
1978–79	Oklahoma	13–16			
1979–80	Oklahoma	17–16			
Oklahoma:		30–32 (.484)			
Total:		30–32 (.484)			
