= Chuck Gilmur =

American basketball player

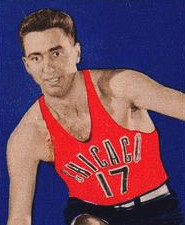
- Gilmur in 1948

Personal information
- Born: August 13, 1922 Seattle, Washington, U.S.
- Died: January 14, 2011 (aged 88) Tacoma, Washington, U.S.
- Listed height: 6 ft 4 in (1.93 m)
- Listed weight: 225 lb (102 kg)

Career information
- High school: Lincoln (Seattle, Washington)
- College: Washington (1940–1943)
- Playing career: 1946–1951
- Position: Forward / center
- Number: 7, 17, 11

Career history
- 1946–1949: Chicago Stags
- 1949–1951: Washington Capitols

Career highlights
- First-team All-PCC (1943)
- Stats at NBA.com
- Stats at Basketball Reference

Charles Edward Gilmur Jr. (August 13, 1922 – January 14, 2011) was an American basketball player, enthusiast, and high school teacher.

A 6'4" forward/center from the University of Washington, Gilmur earned first-team All-PCC honors in 1943. He played in the National Basketball Association from 1946 to 1951 as a member of the Chicago Stags and Washington Capitols. He averaged 5.8 points per game in his career and led the league in personal fouls (231) during the 1947–48 season. Gilmur later worked as a teacher and basketball coach in Washington state.

Gilmur died on January 14, 2011.

== BAA/NBA career statistics ==
Legend
GP	Games played	FG%	Field-goal percentage
FT%	Free-throw percentage	RPG	Rebounds per game
APG	Assists per game	PPG	Points per game
**Bold**	Career high

=== Regular season ===
Year	Team	GP	FG%	FT%	RPG	APG	PPG
1946–47	Chicago	51	.300	.394	–	.4	3.5
1947–48	Chicago	48	.303	.655	–	1.6	**9.6**
1948–49	Chicago	56	**.391**	.545	–	**2.2**	5.1
1949–50	Washington	**68**	.335	**.680**	–	1.6	6.1
1950–51	Washington	16	.279	.531	**4.7**	1.1	3.2
Career		239	.325	.609	4.7	1.5	5.8

=== Playoffs ===
Year	Team	GP	FG%	FT%	RPG	APG	PPG
1947	Chicago	**11**	.254	.462	–	.1	5.8
1948	Chicago	5	.200	**.783**	–	**2.0**	**8.8**
1949	Chicago	2	**.333**	.333	–	1.5	1.5
Career		18	.236	.641	–	.8	6.2
