= Mickey Rottner =

American basketball player (1919–2011)

Personal information
- Born: March 23, 1919 Chicago, Illinois, U.S.
- Died: September 21, 2011 (aged 92) Chicago, Illinois, U.S.
- Listed height: 5 ft 10 in (1.78 m)
- Listed weight: 180 lb (82 kg)

Career information
- High school: Tuley (Chicago, Illinois)
- College: Loyola Chicago (1939–1942)
- Playing career: 1942–1948
- Position: Guard
- Number: 6

Career history
- 1945–1946: Sheboygan Red Skins
- 1946–1948: Chicago Stags
- Stats at NBA.com
- Stats at Basketball Reference

Marvin "Mickey" Rottner (March 23, 1919 – September 21, 2011) was an American professional basketball player. He played three seasons of professional basketball in the years leading up to the formation of the National Basketball Association.

Rottner, a 5'10" guard from Tuley High School in Chicago, played collegiately at Loyola University in Chicago. He played for the Ramblers from 1939 to 1942 and was later named to the school's athletics hall of fame.

Following his college career, Rottner played professionally, first in the National Basketball League (NBL) for the Sheboygan Red Skins in 1945–46. He averaged four points per game for the Red Skins as they made it all the way to the NBL finals, where they lost to the Rochester Royals. Rottner then moved to the Basketball Association of America (BAA) to play for the Chicago Stags for two seasons. He averaged 5.4 points and 1.4 assists for the Stags in 100 games.

Rottner died September 21, 2011.

== BAA career statistics ==
Legend
GP	Games played	FG%	Field-goal percentage
FT%	Free-throw percentage	APG	Assists per game
PPG	Points per game	**Bold**	Career high

=== Regular season ===
Year	Team	GP	FG%	FT%	APG	PPG
1946–47	Chicago	**56**	**.290**	**.544**	**1.7**	**7.6**
1947–48	Chicago	44	.288	.324	1.0	2.7
Career		100	.290	.478	1.4	5.4

=== Playoffs ===
Year	Team	GP	FG%	FT%	APG	PPG
1947	Chicago	**10**	.116	.250	.3	1.1
1948	Chicago	4	**.200**	**.333**	**.5**	**1.8**
Career		14	.138	.286	.4	1.3
