= Don Carlson =

American basketball player (1919–2004)

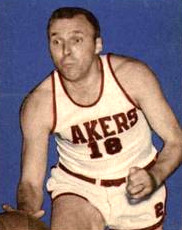
- Carlson in 1948

Personal information
- Born: March 22, 1921 Minneapolis, Minnesota, U.S.
- Died: October 16, 2004 (aged 83)
- Listed height: 6 ft 0 in (1.83 m)
- Listed weight: 170 lb (77 kg)

Career information
- High school: Edison (Minneapolis, Minnesota)
- College: Minnesota (1940–1942, 1945–1946)
- Playing career: 1946–1951
- Position: Shooting guard / small forward
- Number: 15

Career history
- 1946–1947: Chicago Stags
- 1947–1950: Minneapolis Lakers
- 1950–1951: Baltimore Bullets

Career highlights
- NBL champion (1948); BAA champion (1949); NBA champion (1950); WPBT champion (1948)
- Stats at NBA.com
- Stats at Basketball Reference

Donald Vernon Carlson (March 22, 1921 – October 16, 2004) was an American professional basketball player. Known as Swede Carlson, he was born in Minneapolis, Minnesota.

A 6-foot-0-inch (1.83 m) swingman from the University of Minnesota, Carlson played professionally for five seasons, from 1946 to 1951, in the Basketball Association of America, National Basketball League and the National Basketball Association as a member of the Chicago Stags, Minneapolis Lakers, and Baltimore Bullets. He won three professional championships with the Lakers, one in each of the leagues he played in, and the World Professional Basketball Tournament in 1948. After his playing days, he was a coach and athletic director at Columbia Heights High School in Columbia Heights, Minnesota.

Carlson died in 2004.

== Professional career statistics ==
Legend
GP	Games played	GS	Games started	MPG	Minutes per game
FG%	Field goal percentage	3P%	3-point field goal percentage	FT%	Free throw percentage
RPG	Rebounds per game	APG	Assists per game	SPG	Steals per game
BPG	Blocks per game	PPG	Points per game	**Bold**	Career high
†	Won an NBA championship

=== Regular season ===
Year	Team	League	GP	FG%	FT%	RPG	APG	PPG
1946–47	Chicago	BAA	**59**	.322	.541	–	1.0	**10.7**
1947–48†	Minneapolis	NBL	58	-	.596	–	-	8.2
1948–49†	Minneapolis	BAA	55	.334	.662	–	**3.1**	9.2
1949–50†	Minneapolis	NBA	57	.341	**.726**	–	1.3	4.7
1950–51	Baltimore	NBA	9	**.370**	.500	**1.7**	2.1	4.7
NBL career			58	-	.596	–	-	8.2
NBA/BAA career			180	.330	.623	1.7	1.8	8.0

=== Playoffs ===
Year	Team	League	GP	FG%	FT%	RPG	APG	PPG
1946–47	Chicago	BAA	**11**	.270	.614	–	.5	**12.3**
1947–48†	Minneapolis	NBL	9	-	.400	–	-	4.2
1948–49†	Minneapolis	BAA	10	.242	.560	–	**2.8**	6.0
1949–50†	Minneapolis	NBA	10	**.568**	**.800**	–	1.1	5.4
NBL career			9	-	.400	–	-	4.2
NBA/BAA Career			40	.295	.631	–	1.5	8.0
