= Charley Rosen =

American basketball player (1941–2025)

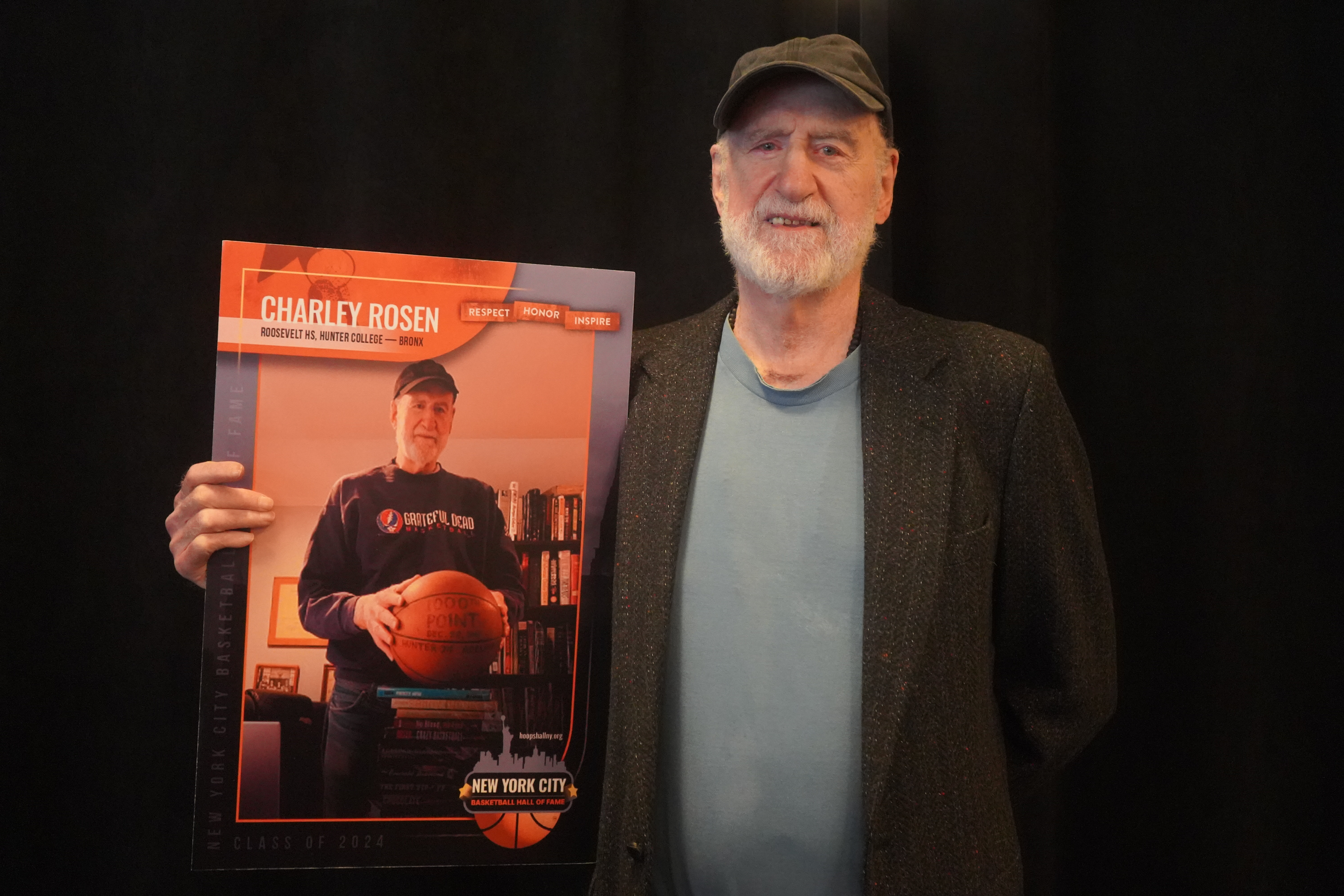
- Rosen at his induction to the NYC Basketball Hall of Fame, 2024

Personal information
- Born: January 18, 1941 The Bronx, New York City, U.S.
- Died: September 13, 2025 (aged 84) Kingston, New York, U.S.
- Listed height: 6 ft 8 in (2.03 m)

Career information
- College: Hunter (1959–1962)
- NBA draft: 1962: undrafted
- Playing career: 1962–1963
- Coaching career: 1979–1995

Career history

Playing
- 1962–1963: Scranton Miners

Coaching
- 1979–1980: Bard
- 1983–1986: Albany Patroons (assistant)
- 1986–1987: Savannah Spirits
- 1987–1990: Rockford Lightning
- 1990–1991: Oklahoma City Cavalry
- 1991–1992: Albany Patroons
- 1993–1995: SUNY New Paltz (women's)
Medals
Men's basketball
Representing the United States
Maccabiah Games
| Gold medal – first place | 1961 Israel | Men's basketball |

Charles Elliot Rosen (January 18, 1941 – September 13, 2025) was an American sports journalist, author, basketball player, mentor and coach.

== Background ==
Rosen was born in The Bronx on January 18, 1941. He attended Theodore Roosevelt High School. Standing at 6 ft 8 in (2.03 m), he played college basketball at Hunter College in New York City for three seasons (1959–62), setting school records for both scoring and rebounding, and earning most valuable player honors each season.

== Career ==
Rosen, along with Larry Brown and Art Heyman, played on the United States basketball team that won the gold medal at the 1961 Maccabiah Games.

After college, he played for Scranton Miners in the old Eastern Professional Basketball League, and taught English at Hofstra University on Long Island, New York.

From 1983 to 1986, he was an assistant to Phil Jackson with the Albany Patroons of the Continental Basketball Association (CBA). He also served as head coach of the Patroons, as well as the CBA's Rockford Lightning, Oklahoma City Cavalry and Savannah Spirits.

He also served as head coach of the women's basketball team at the State University of New York at New Paltz, a four-year college located between Albany and New York City, and was men's head coach at Bard College during the 1979–80 season, which he chronicled in the book Players and Pretenders.

=== Writing ===
Rosen was the author of more than two dozen books about basketball, including The First Tip Off, The House of Moses All-Stars, Barney Polan's Game, No Blood, No Foul, More Than a Game, The Pivotal Season, and The Wizard of Odds. Rosen was inducted into the Bronx Jewish Hall of Fame on November 28, 2018. Barney Polan's Game and The House of Moses All-Stars were both recognized as New York Times Notable Books, and Barney Polan's Game was recognized on the New York Times Book Review Editor's 1998 Recommended Summer Reading List.

He was known for his in-depth analysis and caustic views. His last article at FOXSports.com was dated June 29, 2011. Afterward, his articles were published at HoopsHype.com.

== Personal life and death ==
Rosen was married three times and divorced twice. He had two children with Susan Weiss, and was later married to swimmer Barbara Chesneau. His marriage to Daia Gerson lasted until his death.

Rosen lived in Accord, New York, and died from thyroid cancer at a hospital in nearby Kingston, New York, on September 13, 2025, at the age of 84.
