= Max Zaslofsky =

American basketball player and coach (1925–1985)

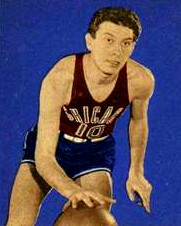
- Zaslofsky in 1948

Personal information
- Born: December 7, 1925 Brooklyn, New York, U.S.
- Died: October 15, 1985 (aged 59)
- Listed height: 6 ft 2 in (1.88 m)
- Listed weight: 170 lb (77 kg)

Career information
- High school: Thomas Jefferson (Brooklyn, New York)
- College: St. John's (1945–1946)
- Playing career: 1946–1956
- Position: Shooting guard
- Number: 10, 5, 14, 6
- Coaching career: 1967–1969

Career history

Playing
- 1946–1950: Chicago Stags
- 1950–1953: New York Knicks
- 1953: Baltimore Bullets
- 1953: Milwaukee Hawks
- 1953–1956: Fort Wayne Pistons
- 1956: Trenton Capitols
- 1957–1958: Wilkes-Barre Barons

Career highlights
- 4× All-BAA/NBA First Team (1947–1950); NBA All-Star (1952); BAA scoring champion (1948)

Career NBA statistics
- Points: 7,990 (14.8 ppg)
- Assists: 1,093 (2.0 apg)
- Stats at NBA.com
- Stats at Basketball Reference

Max "Slats" Zaslofsky (December 7, 1925 – October 15, 1985) was an American professional basketball player and coach. He played in the Basketball Association of America (BAA) and National Basketball Association (NBA) where he was selected to the all-league first-team from 1947 to 1950. In the 1947–48 BAA season, at 21 years of age, he led the BAA in scoring (Note: Zaslofsky's 1,007 total points and 21.7 points per game average are both the lowest marks recorded by an NBA/BAA scoring champion in a single season.), and in the 1949–50 NBA season, he led the league in free throw percentage (.843).

== Early life ==
Zaslofsky, who was Jewish, was the son of Russian immigrant parents, Morris and Ida. He had two older brothers, Irving and Abe. He grew up in Brooklyn, attended cheder until he had his bar mitzvah, and spent many hours as a child on the playgrounds trying to perfect his two-handed set shot. Raised on Riverdale Street in the predominantly Jewish section of Brownsville, he attended Thomas Jefferson High School, where he was an All-PSAL selection in basketball and also played for the baseball team. He graduated from high school in 1943, and then spent two years in the U.S. Navy during World War II.

== College career ==
He attended St. John's University, where he played basketball for one season. The 20-year-old Zaslofsky started at guard and averaged 7.8 points per game. He was named honorable mention All-Metropolitan as St. John's posted a 17–5 record and played in the postseason National Invitation Tournament (NIT).

== Professional career ==
After his freshman season, he left St. John's to join the Chicago Stags of the newly organized Basketball Association of America, the forerunner of the National Basketball Association.

While playing for the Chicago Stags, Zaslofsky was named All-NBA First Team 1946–47 at the age of 21. He was the youngest player to hold that distinction for nearly 60 years until he was surpassed by LeBron James in 2005–06. In 1947–48, he led the league in scoring. At 22 years, 121 days old, he was the youngest player to lead the league in scoring until 2010, when Kevin Durant broke his mark. In 1949–50, he led the league in free throw percentage (.843).

After the Stags broke up, Zaslofsky joined the New York Knicks. During the 1951 NBA Playoffs, Zaslofsky played 14 games and averaged a postseason career-best 17.9 points, as well as 4.1 rebounds and 2.7 assists, as the Knicks made it to the NBA Finals before losing a seven-game series to the Rochester Royals. The following year, he led the Knicks to the 1952 NBA Finals, where they lost to the Minneapolis Lakers, again in a seven-game series. On August 24, 1953, he was traded by the Knicks with Jim Luisi and Roy Belliveau to the Baltimore Bullets for Jim Baechtold. On November 25, 1953, he was traded by the Bullets to the Milwaukee Hawks for Bob Houbregs. On December 21, 1953, he was traded by the Hawks to the Fort Wayne Pistons for Chuck Share. In 1956 he ended his career as the league's third-leading scorer of all time, behind George Mikan and Joe Fulks. In addition to his 1946–47 first-team All-NBA honors, Zaslofsky was named to the All-NBA first team in 1947–48, 1948–49, and 1949–50. He also played in the 1952 NBA All-Star Game. In the pre-shot clock era (prior to the 1954-55 season), he recorded the third most points with 7,117.

He later coached for two seasons in the American Basketball Association with the New Jersey Americans/New York Nets. He went 53–103 in two seasons with the club before resigning in March 1969.

Zaslofsky was nominated for the NBA 25th Anniversary Team in 1971. He is one of only two members nominated to the team that are not elected in the Naismith Basketball Hall of Fame.

He was inducted into the New York City Basketball Hall of Fame in 1993.

== Personal life ==
Zaslofsky is a member of the International Jewish Sports Hall of Fame and the New York City Basketball Hall of Fame (1993).

Zaslofsky died in 1985 at age 59 due to complications from leukemia. He was survived by his wife, Elaine, two daughters, a son, and two grandchildren.

== BAA/NBA career statistics ==
Legend
GP	Games played	GS	Games started	MPG	Minutes per game
FG%	Field goal percentage	3P%	3-point field goal percentage	FT%	Free throw percentage
RPG	Rebounds per game	APG	Assists per game	SPG	Steals per game
BPG	Blocks per game	PPG	Points per game	**Bold**	Career high
*	Led the league

=== Regular season ===
Year	Team	GP	MPG	FG%	FT%	RPG	APG	PPG
1946–47	Chicago	61	–	.329	.737	–	.7	14.4
1947–48	Chicago	48	–	.323	.784	–	.6	**21.0***
1948–49	Chicago	58	–	.350	.840	–	2.6	20.6
1949–50	Chicago	68	–	.351	.843*	–	2.3	16.4
1950–51	New York	66	–	.354	.775	3.5	2.1	12.7
1951–52	New York	66	32.0	.336	.755	2.9	2.4	14.1
1952–53	New York	29	24.9	**.384**	.690	2.6	1.9	11.9
1953–54	Baltimore	11	**38.0**	.352	.767	**3.9**	**3.0**	16.4
1953–54	Milwaukee	9	33.2	.341	.712	3.1	2.6	15.1
1953–54	Fort Wayne	45	25.9	.382	.693	2.0	2.2	11.0
1954–55	Fort Wayne	**70**	26.6	.328	.702	2.7	2.9	11.2
1955–56	Fort Wayne	9	20.2	.358	**.857**	1.8	1.8	9.8
Career		540	28.3	.343	.769	2.8	2.0	14.8
All-Star		1	25.0	.429	1.000	4.0	2.0	11.0

=== Playoffs ===
Year	Team	GP	MPG	FG%	FT%	RPG	APG	PPG
1947	Chicago	11	–	.302	.659	–	.4	13.5
1948	Chicago	5	–	.341	.787	–	.0	19.4
1949	Chicago	2	–	.306	.778	–	**3.0**	22.0
1950	Chicago	2	–	**.469**	.833	–	**3.0**	**22.5**
1951	New York	**14**	–	.406	.740	**4.1**	2.7	17.9
1952	New York	**14**	**36.1**	.373	.809	3.1	1.6	16.2
1954	Fort Wayne	4	24.5	.306	**.867**	.8	1.5	8.8
1955	Fort Wayne	11	11.7	.409	.800	1.5	1.6	4.7
Career		63	25.3	.360	.772	2.8	1.6	14.3

== Head coaching record ==
=== ABA ===
Legend
Regular season	G	Games coached	W	Games won	L	Games lost	W–L %	Win–loss %
Playoffs	PG	Playoff games	PW	Playoff wins	PL	Playoff losses	PW–L %	Playoff win–loss %

Team	Year	G	W	L	W–L%	Finish	PG	PW	PL	PW–L%	Result
New Jersey	1967–68	78	36	42	.462	5th in Eastern	–	–	–	–	Missed playoffs
N.Y. Nets	1968–69	78	17	61	.218	5th in Eastern	–	–	–	–	Missed playoffs
Career		156	53	103	.352		–	–	–	–	

== See also ==
- List of select Jewish basketball players
- List of National Basketball Association annual scoring leaders
