= Chick Halbert =

American basketball player (1919–2013)

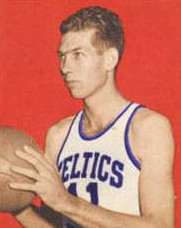
- Halbert in 1948

Personal information
- Born: February 27, 1919 Albany, Texas
- Died: March 4, 2013 (aged 94) Coupeville, Washington
- Listed height: 6 ft 9 in (2.06 m)
- Listed weight: 225 lb (102 kg)

Career information
- High school: House (House, New Mexico)
- College: West Texas A&M (1939–1942)
- Position: Center
- Number: 22, 20, 11, 6, 14, 13

Career history
- 1946–1947: Chicago Stags
- 1947–1948: Philadelphia Warriors
- 1948–1949: Boston Celtics
- 1949: Providence Steamrollers
- 1949–1951: Washington Capitols
- 1951: Baltimore Bullets

Career highlights
- All-BAA Second Team (1947); Third-team All-American – Converse (1942)
- Stats at NBA.com
- Stats at Basketball Reference

Charles Pinkney "Chick" Halbert IV (February 27, 1919 – March 4, 2013) was an American professional basketball player.

A 6'9" center from West Texas A&M University, Halbert played five seasons (1946–1951) in the Basketball Association of America (later known as the National Basketball Association). He was a member of the Chicago Stags, the Philadelphia Warriors, the Boston Celtics, the Providence Steamrollers, the Washington Capitols, and the Baltimore Bullets. He averaged 8.8 points per game and 7.9 rebounds per game in his career and earned All-BAA Second Team honors in 1947.

== BAA/NBA career statistics ==
Legend
GP	Games played	FG%	Field-goal percentage
FT%	Free-throw percentage	RPG	Rebounds per game
APG	Assists per game	PPG	Points per game
**Bold**	Career high

=== Regular season ===
Year	Team	GP	FG%	FT%	RPG	APG	PPG
1946–47	Chicago	61	.306	.598	–	.8	**12.7**
1947–48	Chicago	6	.218	.350	–	.3	5.2
1947–48	Philadelphia	40	.262	.665	–	.8	10.5
1948–49	Boston	33	.293	.596	–	1.8	9.4
1948–49	Providence	27	.333	.650	–	1.9	11.4
1949–50	Washington	**68**	**.380**	.640	–	1.3	4.8
1950–51	Washington / Baltimore	68	.365	**.694**	**7.9**	**2.3**	7.4
Career		303	.314	.633	7.9	1.4	8.8

=== Playoffs ===
Year	Team	GP	FG%	FT%	RPG	APG	PPG
1947	Chicago	11	.253	.604	–	.3	**14.1**
1948	Philadelphia	**13**	.265	**.607**	–	.3	11.5
1950	Washington	2	**.438**	.556	–	**1.5**	9.5
Career		26	.266	.603	–	.4	12.4
