= Chicago Stags =

- Division: Western (1946–1949); Central (1949–1950)
- Founded: 1946
- Folded: 1950
- History: Chicago Stags; 1946–1950
- Arena: Chicago Stadium
- Location: Chicago, Illinois
- Team colors: Red, blue, white
- Head coach: Harold Olsen (1946–1948); Philip Brownstein (1948–1950)
- Division titles: 1 (1947)
Home	Away	Third

The Chicago Stags were a National Basketball Association team based in Chicago from 1946 to 1950 before it ceased operations.

== History ==
=== 1946–47 season ===
In the BAA's inaugural year, the Chicago Stags were originally meant to start out as the Chicago Atomics, to the point of even playing an exhibition game against the New York Knicks under that moniker before playing as the Chicago Basketball Club, Inc. for one more exhibition game before officially becoming the Chicago Stags for the rest of their existence. During this time, the Stags were placed in the Western Division, and after 60 games were tied with the St. Louis Bombers at 38–22 each. A tiebreaker game between the two teams on March 31, 1947, resulted in the Stags defeating the Bombers in overtime, 73–66, to clinch the division and a first round bye.

Under the initial playoff format, the two division champions faced each other in the Semifinals. The Stags defeated the Washington Capitols, the only team to finish with a better record than the Stags, 4–2, and went on to lose to the Philadelphia Warriors in the BAA Finals, 4–1. Despite making it to the BAA's first ever championship series against the Warriors, the Stags were initially undecided on whether they would be able to continue onward for at least another season, though they ultimately decided to carry on for at least another season (unlike the Toronto Huskies, who voted under a similar measure to the Stags) despite their initial concerns.

=== 1947–48 season ===
The next season, the Stags finished second in their division with a 28–20 record, one game behind the St. Louis Bombers, and second overall in the league. In the playoffs, they won a tiebreaker game against the Washington Capitols, advancing to play the Boston Celtics in the First Round. The Stags won, moving into the Semifinals for the second consecutive year. However, they were defeated by the eventual champions, the Baltimore Bullets.

=== 1948–49 season ===
The next year, the Stags finished third, 38–22, seven games behind division-winning Rochester Royals. The playoffs were expanded from six to eight teams, and the Stags played the Minneapolis Lakers in the Division semifinals where they lost 2–0.

=== 1949–50 season ===
In their final season, the Stags finished tied for third with the Fort Wayne Pistons with a 40–28 record, and again lost to the Lakers in the Division semifinals.

=== Purchase by Abe Saperstein, name change and folding ===
Abe Saperstein, owner of the famed Harlem Globetrotters, bought the Stags in June 1950. In August, Saperstein announced that the team would be known as the Chicago Bruins and would play double-headers with his Globetrotters on most of its home dates in Chicago Stadium, something the now-former Stags had already done several times. In fact, the Stags final playoff game was part of a triple-header that also involved the Trotters. The Bruins also planned on playing "home games" in such cities as Detroit, Milwaukee, Peoria, Illinois, St. Louis, Kansas City and Cincinnati, making the Bruins a regional franchise.

However, by September, Saperstein's deal to buy the club fell apart when he withdrew his offer and requested NBA president Maurice Podoloff return his $20,000 deposit, reportedly half of the purchase price. Saperstein claimed he had received "exactly nothing" from the NBA for his money: neither the club nor the contract of four ex-Stags players who jumped to the National Professional Basketball League. (Supposedly, Podoloff, acting on behest of a group of other NBA owners, "foreclosed" on the Stags due to their inability to repay a $40,000 loan that enabled them to finish the 1949–50 season in the first place.) It marked the end of the NBA in Chicago until the Chicago Packers were joined in 1961.

On April 25, 1950, Bob Cousy was drafted by the Tri-Cities Blackhawks but did not sign with the team. Cousy wanted $10,000 and Blackhawks owner Ben Kerner countered with $6,000 in negotiations. Cousy was then sold to the Stags in a trade. When the Stags/Bruins folded on September 25, 1950, a dispersal draft was held on October 5, to divide their players throughout the league, with Cousy going to the Boston Celtics.

The Stags were one of seven teams that quickly left the NBA: the original Denver Nuggets, Anderson Packers, Sheboygan Red Skins and Waterloo Hawks jumped to the NPBL, while Chicago and the St. Louis Bombers folded, shrinking the loop from 17 teams to 11 at the dawn of the 1950–51 season. (The situation got worse in January 1951 as the Washington Capitols folded as well, bringing the number of NBA teams down to ten.) Following the Washington Capitols folding operations and the New York Knicks threatening to leave the NBA themselves after witnessing what was seen as "disgraceful conduct" from their stateside rivals of the time in the Syracuse Nationals and player-coach Al Cervi (alongside rumors of the Tri-Cities Blackhawks being sold, relocated, or otherwise defecting to the recently created National Professional Basketball League themselves), the Chicago Stags under Abe Saperstein's ownership attempted to file a lawsuit against the NBA to get the franchise reinstated back into the league properly, though Saperstein would ultimately fail to get the desired results that he would hope to get from that lawsuit in question.

The NBA would return to Chicago twice, first with the Packers/Zephyrs (now the Washington Wizards) from 1961 to 1963 and since 1966 with the Bulls.

== Arena ==
The Stags played at Chicago Stadium, which was located at 1800 West Madison Street and was demolished in 1995 to make way for the United Center; it later served as the home court of the Bulls from 1967 to 1994.

== Notable players ==
- Don Carlson
- Chuck Gilmur
- Chick Halbert C
- Paul Huston
- Johnny Jorgensen
- Stan Miasek
- Doyle Parrack
- Andy Phillip
- Gene Rock G
- Ken Rollins G (gold medalist in the 1948 Summer Olympics)
- Mickey Rottner F
- Kenny Sailors
- Ben Schadler
- Jim Seminoff
- Jack Toomay
- Gene Vance #12 G
- Max Zaslofsky (1947–48 scoring leader of BAA)

=== Basketball Hall of Famers ===
Chicago Stags Hall of Famers
Players
No.	Name	Position	Tenure	Inducted
19	Andy Phillip	G	1947–1950	1961
Coaches
Name		Position	Tenure	Inducted
Harold Olsen		Head coach	1946–1949	1959

== Season-by-season records ==
BAA/NBA champions	Division champions	Playoff berth

Season	League	Division	Finish	Wins	Losses	Win%	GB	Playoffs	Awards
1946–47	BAA	Western	1st	39	22	.639	—	Won BAA Semifinals (Capitols) 4–2; Lost BAA Finals (Warriors) 1–4	
1947–48	BAA	Western	3rd	28	20	.583	1	Won Division Tiebreaker (Capitols); Won First round (Boston) 2–1; Lost BAA Semifinals (Bullets) 0–2	
1948–49	BAA	Western	3rd	38	22	.633	7	Lost Division semifinals (Lakers) 0–2	
1949–50	NBA	Central	3rd	40	28	.588	11	Lost Division Tiebreaker (Pistons); Lost Division semifinals (Lakers) 0–2	
Regular season record				145	92	.612	1946–1950		
Playoff record				8	14	.364	Postseason series record: 3–5		

== Aftermath ==
The Chicago Bulls, the city's current NBA team, wore replicas of the 1946 Stags uniforms during the 2005–06 NBA season as part of the NBA's "Hardwood Classics" program (they wore them on December 5, 2005, February 22, 2006, and April 16, 2006).
