= 1947–48 Minneapolis Lakers season =

Pro basketball team season (inaugural season won NBL championship)

- NBL champions
- Division champions
- Head coach: John Kundla
- General manager: Max Winter
- Owners: Ben Berger
- Arena: Minneapolis Auditorium

Results
- Record: 43–17 (.717)
- Place: Division: 1st (Western)
- Playoff finish: NBL Champions (Defeated Royals 3–1)
- Stats at Basketball Reference

The 1947–48 Minneapolis Lakers season was the inaugural season for the Lakers in Minneapolis following their relocation from Detroit where they played as the Detroit Gems the previous season. This season would be considered a hard reboot for the franchise, to the point where some fans and sports historians claim that the Detroit Gems and Minneapolis Lakers exist as two separate franchises due to the myriad of ways the franchise reset itself from the past in Detroit to the way it became what it was out in Minneapolis. During this season, on February 19, 1948, the Lakers would play a notable exhibition game against the Harlem Globetrotters to decide which of the two teams were considered the best team of the two at that time; while the Globetrotters would stun the Lakers with a 61–59 defeat for the Lakers due to a buzzer-beating 30-foot shot by Ermer Robinson, the game itself would be a catalyst for not just many more exhibition matches between the two teams for a few years afterward once the Lakers entered the BAA and then the NBA (which saw Harlem winning their first rematch before the Lakers won the rest of their subsequent match-ups not long afterward), but also helped see the end of racial segregation in the sport of basketball as well. The Lakers won the National Basketball League championship against the Rochester Royals. George Mikan led the team with 21.3 points per game and was the league's MVP. (Originally, the NBL and BAA had talks about having their two champions competing in something akin to a "World Series of Basketball" event to determine the ultimate champion between what eventually became the Lakers and the original Baltimore Bullets team that first started out in the ABL (which incidentally was an event held by other professional basketball leagues from the late 1900s until the early 1920s), before those plans ultimately got shelved and cancelled, at least in part due to the aforementioned defection at hand.) After this season ended for the NBL, both the Lakers and Royals would leave the NBL to join the newly rivaling Basketball Association of America (BAA) along with two other longstanding NBL clubs, the Fort Wayne Zollner Pistons and the Indianapolis Kautskys, though Fort Wayne and Indianapolis would rebrand themselves as the Fort Wayne Pistons and Indianapolis Jets respectively in order to join properly due to the BAA not allowing for teams to have brand promotions as a part of their team names on display.

After talks of a 1948 championship series between the champions of the National Basketball League (which were the Minneapolis Lakers) and the newly-rivaling Basketball Association of America (which were formerly the older rivaling American Basketball League's own Baltimore Bullets, which was also the BAA's original Baltimore Bullets franchise) ultimately never came to fruition, it was decided that the Lakers would also participate in what would ultimately become the final World Professional Basketball Tournament ever held. In the final tournament ever held, the Lakers would crush the original American Basketball League's Wilkes-Barre Barons (who were the only non-NBL professional team competing in that event) 98–48 in the quarterfinal round and barely held on against the Anderson Duffey Packers with a 59–56 win in the semifinal round before winning the final championship over the independent New York Renaissance with a 75–71 victory that year, with the championship match having them being led behind George Mikan's tournament record and (MVP performing) 40 points scored that night.

== Draft picks ==
The Minneapolis Lakers would participate in the 1947 NBL draft, which occurred right after the 1947 BAA draft due to a joint agreement the National Basketball League and the rivaling Basketball Association of America had with each other during the offseason period. However, as of 2026, no records of what the Lakers' draft picks might have been for the NBL have properly come up (assuming they entered this draft as the Minneapolis Lakers instead of their original Detroit Gems team name at the time), with any information on who those selections might have been being lost to time in the process.

== Roster ==
1947–48 Minneapolis Lakers roster
Players

Pos.	No.	Player	Height	Weight	DOB	From
F/C	10	Warren Ajax	6 ft 6 in (1.98 m)	220 lb (100 kg)	1921-05-12	Minnesota
G/F	6	Don Carlson	6 ft 0 in (1.83 m)	170 lb (77 kg)	1919-03-22	Minnesota
G	2	Ted Cook	6 ft 0 in (1.83 m)	170 lb (77 kg)	1922-02-06	Tennessee
G/F	16	Bill Durkee	6 ft 2 in (1.88 m)	180 lb (82 kg)	1923-05-15	California
G/F	3	Jack Dwan	6 ft 2 in (1.88 m)	190 lb (86 kg)	1921-05-03	Loyola Chicago
G	9	Ken Exel	6 ft 0 in (1.83 m)	175 lb (79 kg)	1925-06-10	Minnesota
F/C	15	Bob Gerber	6 ft 6 in (1.98 m)	225 lb (102 kg)	1924-01-01	Toledo
G/F	20	Tony Jaros	6 ft 5 in (1.96 m)	210 lb (95 kg)	1920-02-21	Minnesota
G/F	7	Johnny Jorgensen	6 ft 2 in (1.88 m)	185 lb (84 kg)	1921-12-28	DePaul
C	99	George Mikan	6 ft 10 in (2.08 m)	245 lb (111 kg)	1924-06-18	DePaul
G/F	18	Paul Napolitano	6 ft 2 in (1.88 m)	185 lb (84 kg)	1923-02-03	San Francisco
F	11	Joe Patanelli	6 ft 2 in (1.88 m)	185 lb (84 kg)	1919-09-18	Indiana
F/C	17	Jim Pollard	6 ft 4 in (1.93 m)	185 lb (84 kg)	1922-07-09	Stanford
F/C	4	Jack Rocker	6 ft 5 in (1.96 m)	210 lb (95 kg)	1922-08-12	California
G/F	24	Herm Schaefer	6 ft 0 in (1.83 m)	175 lb (79 kg)	1919-12-20	Indiana
G/F	12	Don Smith	6 ft 2 in (1.88 m)	190 lb (86 kg)	1920-07-27	Minnesota

Coaches
Head coach

John Kundla

Legend
- (DP) Unsigned draft pick
- (FA) Free agent
- (S) Suspended
- Injured

Roster

Note: Warren Ajax, Ted Cook, Bill Durkee, Ken Exel, Bob Gerber, Joe Patanelli, and Jack Rocker were not on the playoff roster this season.

== National Basketball League ==
=== Regular season ===
Does not include exhibition games played either within the NBL or by other teams outside of the NBL that did not count towards Minneapolis' official NBL record for this season, such as the famous 1948 Globetrotters–Lakers exhibition game involving the world famous (all-black) Harlem Globetrotters. While the Lakers would initially struggle with getting fully acclimated with George Mikan's presence at first (to the point of having a low starting point of a 4–6 record early on), once they got used to working with him properly, they would become a near unstoppable force going forward by December 20, with them being fully undefeated against NBL teams during the month of February 1948. An official database created by John Grasso detailing every NBL match possible (outside of two matches that the Kankakee Gallagher Trojans won over the Dayton Metropolitans in 1938) would be released in 2026 showcasing every team's official schedules throughout their time spent in the NBL. As such, these are the official results recorded for the Minneapolis Lakers during their second and final season (or first and only season if the season played as the Detroit Gems isn't included in their history) within the NBL before moving on to play in the BAA (now NBA) for their following season of play.

#	Date	Opponent	Score	Record
1	November 1	@ Oshkosh	W 49–47	1–0
2	November 9	@ Tri-Cities	L 58–66	1–1
3	November 13	Tri-Cities	W 57–41	2–1
4	November 17	Sheboygan	W 58–43	3–1
5	November 20	@ Sheboygan	L 41–56	3–2
6	November 23	Indianapolis	W 67–56	4–2
7	November 27	@ Syracuse	L 66–72	4–3
8	November 29	@ Rochester	L 53–56	4–4
9	December 1	@ Flint (Midland)	L 68–75	4–5
10	December 2	@ Toledo	L 57–59	4–6
11	December 3	@ Fort Wayne	W 68–58	5–6
12	December 4	N Fort Wayne	W 56–42	6–6
13	December 6	N Anderson	W 88–67	7–6
14	December 7	Oshkosh	L 38–44	7–7
15	December 10	Toledo	W 49–46	8–7
16	December 12	N Fort Wayne	L 55–60	8–8
17	December 13	@ Oshkosh	W 67–57	9–8
18	December 14	Anderson	W 60–49	10–8
19	December 17	Anderson	L 53–57	10–9
20	December 18	N Toledo	W 66–56	11–9
21	December 21	Tri-Cities	W 68–62	12–9
22	December 22	Sheboygan	W 61–52	13–9
23	December 27	Toledo	W 55–52	14–9
24	December 28	Indianapolis	W 58–48	15–9
25	January 2	Fort Wayne	L 41–46	15–10
26	January 4	Flint	W 75–50	16–10
27	January 5	Flint	W 80–42	17–10
28	January 8	@ Syracuse	W 68–59	18–10
29	January 10	@ Flint (Midland)	W 66–49	19–10
30	January 11	@ Tri-Cities	L 35–44	19–11
31	January 13	@ Indianapolis	W 64–45	20–11
32	January 17	@ Syracuse	L 65–71 (OT)	20–12
33	January 18	@ Rochester	W 75–73	21–12
34	January 19	@ Flint (Midland)	W 85–72	22–12
35	January 22	N Rochester	W 69–64	23–12
36	January 24	Fort Wayne	W 69–52	24–12
37	January 26	Rochester	W 76–58	25–12
38	January 28	Rochester	L 50–53	25–13
39	February 1	Indianapolis	W 85–55	26–13
40	February 4	Syracuse	W 70–55	27–13
41	February 5	Syracuse	W 95–75	28–13
42	February 8	Oshkosh	W 78–56	29–13
43	February 12	@ Sheboygan	W 68–57	30–13
44	February 14	Toledo	W 65–50	31–13
45	February 16	@ Anderson	W 63–54	32–13
46	February 17	@ Indianapolis	W 66–58	33–13
47	February 22	Oshkosh	W 85–58	34–13
48	February 23	Tri-Cities	W 57–48	35–13
49	February 25	Anderson	W 60–54	36–13
50	February 29	N Syracuse	W 66–56	37–13
51	March 2	@ Indianapolis	L 63–83	37–14
52	March 4	@ Anderson	L 70–73	37–15
53	March 6	@ Oshkosh	W 69–67	38–15
54	March 7	@ Sheboygan	W 68–67	39–15
55	March 8	Sheboygan	W 65–55 (OT)	40–15
56	March 13	Fort Wayne	W 92–64	41–15
57	March 14	Flint/Midland	W 80–54	42–15
58	March 16	@ Rochester	L 63–66	42–16
59	March 17	@ Toledo	W 60–56	43–16
60	March 20	@ Tri-Cities	L 61–65	43–17

==== Western Division standings ====
Pos.	Western Division	Wins	Losses	Win %
1	Minneapolis Lakers	43	17	.717
2	Tri-Cities Blackhawks	30	30	.500
3	Oshkosh All-Stars	29	31	.483
4	Indianapolis Kautskys	24	35	.407
5	Sheboygan Red Skins	23	37	.383

=== NBL Playoffs ===
==== NBL Western Division Opening Round ====
(1W) Minneapolis Lakers vs. (3W) Oshkosh All-Stars: Minneapolis wins series 3–1

- Game 1: March 23, 1948 @ Minneapolis: Minneapolis 80, Oshkosh 68
- Game 2: March 24, 1948 @ Minneapolis: Minneapolis 88, Oshkosh 65
- Game 3: March 26, 1948 @ Oshkosh: Oshkosh 69, Minneapolis 51
- Game 4: March 27, 1948 @ Oshkosh: Minneapolis 61, Oshkosh 55

This would be the first and only playoff meeting the Lakers would ever have with the Oshkosh All-Stars, as the Oshkosh franchise would decide to not join up with the other teams in entering the BAA/NBA in later seasons (first unintentionally before later doing so intentionally through concerns involving the All-Stars team potentially moving to Milwaukee in order to find success in the new NBA league).

==== NBL Western Division Semifinals ====
(1W) Minneapolis Lakers vs. (2W) Tri-Cities Blackhawks: Minneapolis wins series 2–0

- Game 1: March 30, 1948 @ Moline, IL (Tri-Cities): Minneapolis 98, Tri-Cities 79
- Game 2: March 31, 1948 @ Minneapolis: Minneapolis 83, Tri-Cities 59

This would be the first official playoff meeting the Lakers would ever have with the Tri-Cities Blackhawks, who are now known as the Atlanta Hawks. They would have more meetings in the NBA Playoffs until 1970, when divisional realignment limited potential playoff meetings between them to just the NBA Finals going forward.

==== NBL Championship ====
(1W) Minneapolis Lakers vs. (1E) Rochester Royals: Minneapolis wins series 3–1

- Game 1: April 13, 1948 @ Minneapolis: Minneapolis 80, Rochester 72
- Game 2: April 14, 1948 @ Minneapolis: Minneapolis 82, Rochester 67
- Game 3: April 15, 1948 @ Rochester: Rochester 74, Minneapolis 60
- Game 4: April 18, 1948 @ Rochester: Minneapolis 75, Rochester 65

Interestingly, this championship series would occur after the 1948 World Professional Basketball Tournament was played (which the Lakers would participate in) as opposed to during or before the World Professional Basketball Tournament like the NBL had done in previous years whenever the WPBT had existed as a tournament, which brought further criticism upon NBL commissioner Ward Lambert (this time upon the Royals' end after the Lakers and other NBL teams criticized Lambert earlier on when he allowed for Rochester to do a late buyout trade for center Arnie Risen from the Indianapolis Kautskys) and later led to his subsequent resignation after the season's conclusion once the Lakers, Royals, Kautskys, and Fort Wayne Zollner Pistons (alongside failed attempts by the Oshkosh All-Stars and the Toledo Jeeps) all left the NBL for the rivaling BAA (with everyone but the Indianapolis team still being active to this day in the NBA in terms of teams that successfully switched leagues). Also, this would become the first official playoff meeting the Lakers would ever have with the Rochester Royals, who are now known as the Sacramento Kings, with them continuing to have a rivalry to this very day.

=== Awards and records ===
- George Mikan, NBL MVP, All-NBL First Team, All-Time NBL Team
- Jim Pollard, All-NBL First Team

== World Professional Basketball Tournament ==
Shortly prior to the NBL Finals, during the days of April 8-11, the Lakers played in the annual World Professional Basketball Tournament in Chicago, with the final eight teams that participated in the event mostly in the final WPBT ever held being in the National Basketball League for a change of pace, with the only other professional team competing being the revived version of the Wilkes-Barre Barons of the American Basketball League (who competed against the Lakers in the quarterfinal round) and the only two independently ran teams being the New York Renaissance and the Bridgeport Newfields, who competed against each other in the quarterfinal round. Initially, there was supposed to have been a championship series between the champions of the National Basketball League (which were the Minneapolis Lakers) and the newly-rivaling Basketball Association of America (which were formerly the older rivaling American Basketball League's own Baltimore Bullets, which was also the BAA's original Baltimore Bullets franchise) in 1948, but that ultimately never came to fruition. Being considered the favorites, they did not disappoint in the first round, blowing out the original American Basketball League's Wilkes-Barre Barons 98–48.

In the semifinal round, the Lakers came out on top against a fellow NBL competing team in the Anderson Duffey Packers, 59–56, behind Mikan's 21 points. In addition to Mikan, Don Carlson would also score 12 points himself, while Herm Schaefer would pick up 10 points on his end in order for the Lakers to win their semifinal match over Anderson.

In the final WPBT championship game that was ever held, the Lakers defeated the independently owned and ran New York Renaissance 75–71, behind George Mikan's tournament record 40 points (breaking a record of 32 points previously set in the 1944 event during the semifinal round by Bob Tough of the Brooklyn Eagles there). Mikan led all scorers with 83 points scored in three games played and was named the tournament's Most Valuable Player. Along with Mikan, Jim Pollard was named to the All-Tournament First Team. This final championship also made the Minneapolis Lakers in their first season under that name become the third and final team to win both the NBL's championship and the WPBT's championship in the same season, joining the Oshkosh All-Stars from the 1941–42 season and the Fort Wayne Zollner Pistons in both 1944 and 1945 as the only NBL teams to claim the same honor that these Lakers had done.

=== Games ===
- Won quarterfinal round (98–48) over Wilkes-Barre Barons
- Won semifinal round (59–56) over Anderson Duffey Packers
- Won final WPBT championship round (75–71) over New York Renaissance

=== Awards and records ===
- George Mikan, All-Tournament First Team, MVP, leading scorer
- Jim Pollard, All-Tournament First Team
