= Arnie Ferrin =

American basketball player (1925–2022)

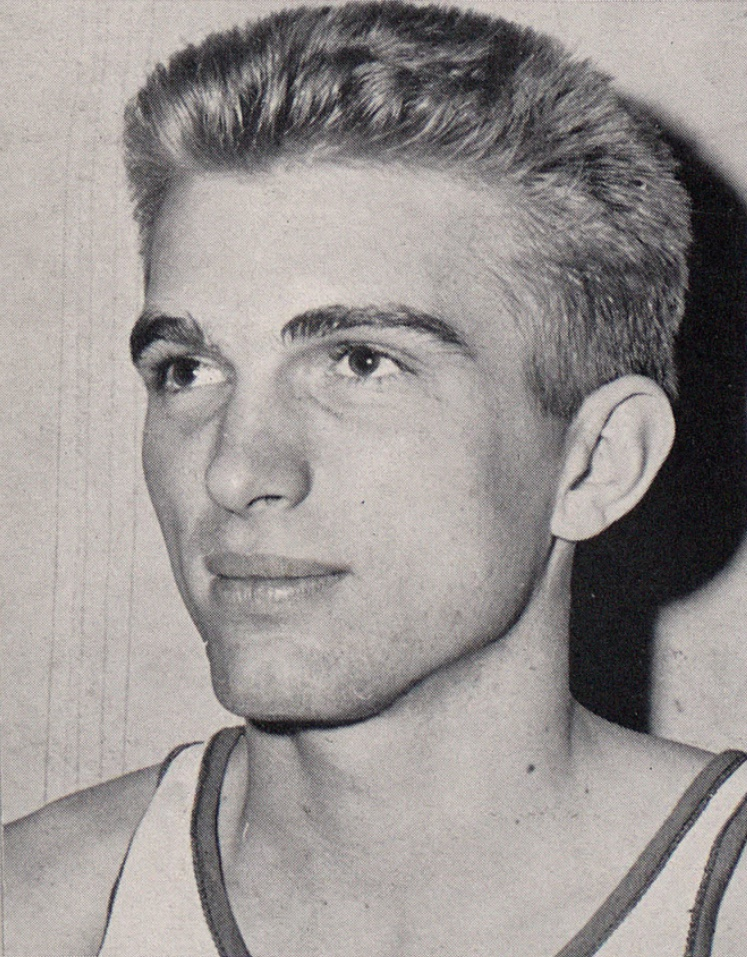
- Ferrin from the 1948 Utonian

Personal information
- Born: July 29, 1925 Salt Lake City, Utah, U.S.
- Died: December 27, 2022 (aged 97)
- Listed height: 6 ft 2 in (1.88 m)
- Listed weight: 180 lb (82 kg)

Career information
- High school: Ogden (Ogden, Utah)
- College: Utah (1943–1948)
- BAA draft: 1948: 2nd round, 59th overall pick
- Drafted by: Minneapolis Lakers
- Playing career: 1948–1951
- Position: Small forward / shooting guard
- Number: 18

Career history
- 1948–1951: Minneapolis Lakers

Career highlights
- 2× BAA/NBA champion (1949, 1950); NCAA champion (1944); NCAA Final Four MOP (1944); NIT champion (1947); Consensus first-team All-American (1945); 3× Consensus second-team All-American (1944, 1947, 1948); No. 22 retired by Utah Utes

Career BAA and NBA statistics
- Points: 1,037 (5.8 ppg)
- Rebounds: 271 (4.0 rpg)
- Assists: 202 (1.6 apg)
- Stats at NBA.com
- Stats at Basketball Reference
- Collegiate Basketball Hall of Fame

Chariton Arnold Ferrin Jr. (July 29, 1925 − December 27, 2022) was an American professional basketball player, executive, and college athletics administrator. He played college basketball for the Utah Utes and earned All-American honors four times. He won an NCAA championship in 1944, when he was named the NCAA tournament Most Outstanding Player (MOP). They added a National Invitation Tournament (NIT) title in 1947. Ferrin played professionally with the Minneapolis Lakers in the Basketball Association of America (BAA) and National Basketball Association (NBA). They won league titles in 1949 and 1950.

After his playing career, Ferrin was general manager of the Utah Stars of the American Basketball Association (ABA) from 1972 through 1974. He served as the athletic director at his alma mater, the University of Utah, from 1976 to 1985.

== Early life ==
Ferrin was born in Salt Lake City. His mother died when he was three years old. Afterwards, his father, Arn, became busy with work; he owned a service station and a small oil delivery company. As his time away from home for work grew, Arn decided to have his parents assume parental responsibilities for his son. When Ferrin was eleven, his father began dating, and eventually remarried. However, Arn had his son continue to live with his grandparents.

== College career ==
At the University of Utah, Ferrin won the NCAA tournament MOP award in 1944, when the Utes won the NCAA championship over Dartmouth with a 42–40 overtime win. He scored 22 points in the game and was the first freshman to win the award. In 1945, Ferrin averaged 17.5 points per game was named a consensus first-team All-American. Following the end of the regular season, he and teammate Fred Sheffield were drafted into the armed forces, and were unavailable for the NCAA tournament. After a year in the Army, Ferrin returned to help Utah win the 1947 NIT and was a runner-up for the tournament's most valuable player award. At the time, the NIT was as prestigious as the fledgling NCAA tournament, if not more so.

As a senior, Ferrin averaged 14.1 points per game, and became the only four-time All-American at Utah, including consensus second-team honors in 1944, 1947, and 1948. His No. 22 was retired by the school.

== Professional playing career ==
Ferrin played professionally for three years with the Minneapolis Lakers from 1949 through 1951 under coach John Kundla. They won the BAA (later known as the NBA) championship in 1949 and won the NBA championship in 1950. He was a top-five scorer on both championship teams, averaging 7.3 points per game in 1948–49 and 5.4 in 1949–50. Ferrin established his single-game career high of 22 points in his rookie year on February 19, 1949, in a win over the Providence Steamrollers. He ended his career with 1,037 total points and an average of 5.8 points per game for the Lakers.

Ferrin was inducted into the National Collegiate Basketball Hall of Fame in 2008 and the Pac-12 Conference Hall of Honor in 2012.

== Later years ==
After his playing career, Ferrin was a member of the Athletic Council at the University of Utah and was a radio color commentator for the school's basketball and football programs. He was the general manager of the ABA's Utah Stars from 1972 to 1974. He was athletic director at the University of Utah from 1976 to 1985. Under Ferrin, Utah won 10 national championships and 15 conference championships. The Utes' gymnastics program won four national championships under coach Greg Marsden and their men's basketball team, led by coach Jerry Pimm, advanced four times to the Sweet Sixteen of the NCAA tournament.

Ferrin died of natural causes on December 27, 2022, at age 97.

== BAA/NBA career statistics ==
Legend
GP	Games played	GS	Games started	MPG	Minutes per game
FG%	Field goal percentage	3P%	3-point field goal percentage	FT%	Free throw percentage
RPG	Rebounds per game	APG	Assists per game	SPG	Steals per game
BPG	Blocks per game	PPG	Points per game	**Bold**	Career high
†	Won an NBA championship

=== Regular season ===
Year	Team	GP	FG%	FT%	RPG	APG	PPG
1948–49†	Minneapolis	47	**.344**	.664	–	**1.6**	**7.3**
1949–50†	Minneapolis	63	.333	**.697**	–	1.5	5.4
1950–51	Minneapolis	**68**	.319	.695	**4.0**	**1.6**	5.2
Career		178	.332	.686	4.0	1.6	5.8

=== Playoffs ===
Year	Team	GP	FG%	FT%	RPG	APG	PPG
1949†	Minneapolis	10	.338	.667	–	2.1	**8.2**
1950†	Minneapolis	**12**	**.340**	.552	–	**2.5**	6.8
1951	Minneapolis	7	.333	**.944**	**4.7**	2.3	5.9
Career		29	.338	.685	4.7	2.3	7.1
