= Jack Tingle =

American basketball player

Personal information
- Born: December 30, 1924 Bedford, Kentucky, U.S.
- Died: September 22, 1958 (aged 33) Louisville, Kentucky, U.S.
- Listed height: 6 ft 4 in (1.93 m)
- Listed weight: 205 lb (93 kg)

Career information
- High school: Trimble (Bedford, Kentucky)
- College: Kentucky (1943–1947)
- NBA draft: 1947: 2nd round, 20th overall pick
- Drafted by: Washington Capitols
- Playing career: 1947–1949
- Position: Small forward / power forward
- Number: 19

Career history
- 1947–1948: Washington Capitols
- 1948–1949: Minneapolis Lakers

Career highlights
- BAA champion (1949); Second-team All-American – True (1947); Third-team All-American – SN (1946)

Career BAA statistics
- Points: 91 (2.3 ppg)
- Assists: 8 (0.2 apg)
- Games played: 39
- Stats at NBA.com
- Stats at Basketball Reference

Robert Jackson Tingle (December 30, 1924 – September 22, 1958) was an American professional basketball player. He was the first player from Trimble County, Kentucky to go to the University of Kentucky on a scholarship for basketball. He was one of only seven UK players to make the all SEC team four years in a row. After graduation, he played two seasons in the NBA for the Washington Capitols and Minneapolis Lakers. After his NBA stint he coached basketball at Hiseville High School and was an engraver for the Louisville Courier-Journal newspaper.

== BAA career statistics ==
Legend
| GP | Games played | FG% | Field-goal percentage |
| FT% | Free-throw percentage | APG | Assists per game |
| PPG | Points per game | **Bold** | Career high |

=== Regular season ===
| Year | Team | GP | FG% | FT% | APG | PPG |
|---|---|---|---|---|---|---|
| 1947–48 | Washington | **37** | **.263** | **.515** | .2 | **2.4** |
| 1948–49 | Minneapolis | 2 | .167 | .000 | **.5** | 1.0 |
| Career | | 39 | .259 | .515 | .2 | 2.3 |
