= 1948–49 Minneapolis Lakers season =

BAA professional basketball team season

- BAA champions
- Head coach: John Kundla
- General manager: Max Winter
- Owners: Ben Berger
- Arena: Minneapolis Auditorium

Results
- Record: 44–16 (.733)
- Place: Division: 2nd (Western)
- Playoff finish: BAA Champions (Defeated Capitols 4–2)
- Stats at Basketball Reference
- Radio: WLOL

The 1948–49 Minneapolis Lakers season was the Lakers' first season in the Basketball Association of America (BAA) (which later became the National Basketball Association (NBA) after the conclusion of this season).

This season saw the Lakers win their first BAA championship, defeating the Washington Capitols in six games in the BAA Finals. Technically speaking, this season would see the Lakers hold back-to-back championship seasons in two different professional basketball leagues, as Minneapolis won their previous season's championship (alongside the last ever WPBT) while competing in the National Basketball League (NBL) in their first season competing as the Minneapolis Lakers before defecting out into the Basketball Association of America to win the last ever BAA Finals championship ever held before the NBL-BAA merger into the NBA happened.

The last remaining active member of the 1948–49 Minneapolis Lakers was center George Mikan, who played his final NBA game in the 1955–56 season, although he missed the 1954–55 season. After long being honored by the Lakers following their eventual move to Los Angeles, Mikan's #99 would eventually be retired properly (albeit posthumously) on October 30, 2022.

== BAA Draft ==
Round	Pick	Player	Position	Nationality	College
1	9	Chuck Hanger	–	United States	California
–	–	Cliff Crandall	–	United States	Oregon State
–	–	Arnie Ferrin	G/F	United States	Utah
–	–	Earl Gardner	F	United States	DePauw
–	–	Dee Gibson	G/F	United States	Western Kentucky
–	–	Ken Jastrow	–	United States	Denver
–	–	Bob Lowther	–	United States	LSU
–	–	Johnny Orr	F	United States	Beloit
–	–	Junior Skogland	–	United States	Gustavus Adolphus
–	–	Quentin Stinson	–	United States	Southern Illinois

Originally, the defending NBL champion Lakers were one of four teams to participate in what was planned to be a joint draft procedure between the BAA and the rivaling National Basketball League. However, on the very day before the joint draft was set to commence, plans for it were scrapped when the Lakers and three other NBL teams (including the team they had beaten in the 1948 NBL Finals, the Rochester Royals) decided to leave the NBL for the BAA, meaning they would participate in the 1948 BAA draft this time around instead or either a joint league draft akin to what the National Football League would later do with the future rivaling American Football League during the late 1960s or the 1948 NBL draft that they were originally meant to be a part of.

== Roster ==
1948–49 Minneapolis Lakers roster
Players

Pos.	No.	Player	Height	Weight	DOB	From
F/C	11	Mike Bloom	6 ft 6 in (1.98 m)	190 lb (86 kg)	1915-01-14	Temple
G/F	15	Don Carlson	6 ft 0 in (1.83 m)	170 lb (77 kg)	1919-03-22	Minnesota
G/F	19	Jack Dwan	6 ft 4 in (1.93 m)	200 lb (91 kg)	1921-05-03	Loyola Chicago
C	18	Ray Ellefson	6 ft 8 in (2.03 m)	230 lb (104 kg)	1922-11-18	West Texas A&M
G/F	18	Arnie Ferrin	6 ft 2 in (1.88 m)	180 lb (82 kg)	1925-07-29	Utah
G	22	Donnie Forman	5 ft 10 in (1.78 m)	175 lb (79 kg)	1926-01-17	NYU
F	14	Earl Gardner	6 ft 3 in (1.91 m)	195 lb (88 kg)	1923-09-18	DePauw
G/F	13	Tony Jaros	6 ft 3 in (1.91 m)	185 lb (84 kg)	1920-02-22	Minnesota
G/F	16	Johnny Jorgensen	6 ft 2 in (1.88 m)	185 lb (84 kg)	1921-12-28	DePaul
G	20	Whitey Kachan	6 ft 2 in (1.88 m)	175 lb (79 kg)	1925-09-15	DePaul
C	99	George Mikan	6 ft 10 in (2.08 m)	245 lb (111 kg)	1924-06-18	DePaul
SF	17	Jim Pollard	6 ft 4 in (1.93 m)	185 lb (84 kg)	1922-07-09	Stanford
G/F	24	Herm Schaefer	6 ft 0 in (1.83 m)	175 lb (79 kg)	1918-12-20	Indiana
G/F	12	Don Smith	6 ft 2 in (1.88 m)	190 lb (86 kg)	1920-07-27	Minnesota
F	19	Jack Tingle	6 ft 4 in (1.93 m)	205 lb (93 kg)	1924-12-30	Kentucky

Coaches
Head coach

John Kundla

Legend
- (DP) Unsigned draft pick
- (FA) Free agent
- (S) Suspended
- Injured

Roster

== Regular season ==
=== Season standings ===
#	Western Division				
#	Team	W	L	PCT	GB
1	x-Rochester Royals	45	15	.750	–
2	x-Minneapolis Lakers	44	16	.733	1
3	x-Chicago Stags	38	22	.633	7
4	x-St. Louis Bombers	29	31	.483	16
5	Fort Wayne Pistons	22	38	.367	23
6	Indianapolis Jets	18	42	.300	27

x – clinched playoff spot

=== Game log ===
#	Date	Opponent	Score	High points	Record
1	November 4	@ Baltimore	W 84–72	Herm Schaefer (23)	1–0
2	November 6	@ Washington	L 62–67	George Mikan (27)	1–1
3	November 9	@ Boston	L 55–77	George Mikan (29)	1–2
4	November 11	@ New York	W 77–68	George Mikan (34)	2–2
5	November 13	@ Providence	W 90–67	George Mikan (38)	3–2
6	November 14	@ Rochester	L 75–92	George Mikan (36)	3–3
7	November 17	Boston	L 72–74	George Mikan (21)	3–4
8	November 19	@ Chicago	W 85–81	Herm Schaefer (28)	4–4
9	November 21	Baltimore	W 94–81	George Mikan (33)	5–4
10	November 23	@ Indianapolis	W 88–82	George Mikan (33)	6–4
11	November 24	Providence	W 117–89	George Mikan (20)	7–4
12	November 27	@ St. Louis	W 87–71	George Mikan (26)	8–4
13	November 28	Philadelphia	W 88–67	Herm Schaefer (25)	9–4
14	November 30	vs. Boston	W 94–84	George Mikan (32)	10–4
15	December 1	@ Fort Wayne	L 74–84	George Mikan (44)	10–5
16	December 4	@ Chicago	L 100–104 (OT)	George Mikan (47)	10–6
17	December 5	St. Louis	W 78–68	George Mikan (27)	11–6
18	December 8	Washington	L 83–94	George Mikan (34)	11–7
19	December 10	@ Rochester	W 96–75	George Mikan (31)	12–7
20	December 12	Rochester	W 67–58	George Mikan (22)	13–7
21	December 15	Indianapolis	W 79–61	Jim Pollard (19)	14–7
22	December 19	Chicago	W 94–84	George Mikan (31)	15–7
23	December 21	@ Philadelphia	L 64–72	George Mikan (18)	15–8
24	December 22	@ New York	L 79–97	George Mikan (24)	15–9
25	December 26	Rochester	W 99–90	George Mikan (32)	16–9
26	December 29	Washington	W 91–68	George Mikan (34)	17–9
27	January 1	Fort Wayne	W 92–72	George Mikan (22)	18–9
28	January 5	St. Louis	W 101–76	George Mikan (31)	19–9
29	January 8	@ St. Louis	L 59–64	George Mikan (22)	19–10
30	January 9	St. Louis	W 74–58	George Mikan (29)	20–10
31	January 12	Providence	W 98–64	George Mikan (26)	21–10
32	January 16	Indianapolis	W 75–66	Jim Pollard (21)	22–10
33	January 18	@ Indianapolis	W 81–56	George Mikan (19)	23–10
34	January 20	Fort Wayne	W 83–65	George Mikan (29)	24–10
35	January 23	Philadelphia	W 89–71	George Mikan (33)	25–10
36	January 26	Chicago	W 84–49	Jim Pollard (20)	26–10
37	January 30	Washington	W 84–79	George Mikan (48)	27–10
38	February 2	@ Fort Wayne	W 82–79 (OT)	George Mikan (31)	28–10
39	February 3	@ Philadelphia	W 78–76	George Mikan (30)	29–10
40	February 6	Rochester	L 74–85	George Mikan (32)	29–11
41	February 10	New York	W 95–75	George Mikan (21)	30–11
42	February 11	@ Chicago	L 97–105	George Mikan (36)	30–12
43	February 13	Baltimore	W 91–74	Jim Pollard (32)	31–12
44	February 16	Chicago	W 90–71	George Mikan (25)	32–12
45	February 18	@ Boston	W 85–71	George Mikan (28)	33–12
46	February 19	@ Providence	W 94–80	George Mikan (29)	34–12
47	February 22	@ New York	W 101–74	George Mikan (48)	35–12
48	February 24	Fort Wayne	W 77–73	George Mikan (31)	36–12
49	February 26	@ Baltimore	L 115–114 (2OT)	George Mikan (53)	37–12
50	February 27	@ Fort Wayne	L 50–74	George Mikan (14)	37–13
51	March 3	@ Indianapolis	W 82–79	George Mikan (24)	38–13
52	March 6	Providence	W 68–59	George Mikan (21)	39–13
53	March 9	Boston	W 74–67	George Mikan (22)	40–13
54	March 10	@ St. Louis	L 71–88	George Mikan (26)	40–14
55	March 12	vs. Indianapolis	W 97–69	Arnie Ferrin (22)	41–14
56	March 13	New York	W 100–90	George Mikan (51)	42–14
57	March 16	@ Washington	L 72–85	George Mikan (24)	42–15
58	March 17	@ Baltimore	L 67–101	Jim Pollard (22)	42–16
59	March 19	@ Rochester	W 99–85	George Mikan (46)	43–16
60	March 20	Philadelphia	W 91–78	George Mikan (28)	44–16

== BAA Playoffs ==
1949 playoff game log
Division Semifinals: 2–0 (home: 1–0; road: 1–0)

Game	Date	Team	Score	High points	Location	Series
1	March 23	Chicago	W 84–77	George Mikan (37)	Minneapolis Auditorium	1–0
2	March 24	@ Chicago	W 101–85	George Mikan (38)	Chicago Stadium	2–0

Division Finals: 2–0 (home: 1–0; road: 1–0)

Game	Date	Team	Score	High points	Location	Series
1	March 27	@ Rochester	W 80–79	George Mikan (32)	Edgerton Park Arena	1–0
2	March 29	Rochester	W 67–55	George Mikan (31)	St. Paul Auditorium	2–0

BAA Finals: 4–2 (home: 3–0; road: 1–2)

Game	Date	Team	Score	High points	Location Attendance	Series
1	April 4	Washington	W 88–84	George Mikan (42)	Minneapolis Auditorium; 8,210	1–0
2	April 6	Washington	W 76–62	Don Carlson (16)	Minneapolis Auditorium; 10,212	2–0
3	April 8	@ Washington	W 94–74	George Mikan (35)	Uline Arena; 4,919	3–0
4	April 9	@ Washington	L 71–83	George Mikan (27)	Uline Arena; 4,471	3–1
5	April 11	@ Washington	L 65–74	George Mikan (22)	Uline Arena; 3,840	3–2
6	April 13	Washington	W 77–56	George Mikan (29)	St. Paul Auditorium; 10,482	4–2

1949 schedule

This season held their first playoff series match-up against the Chicago Stags, as well as their first and only championship match-up against the Washington Capitols before that team folded operations on January 9, 1951.

== Awards and records ==
- George Mikan, All-BAA First Team
- Jim Pollard, All-BAA First Team
