= Earl Gardner =

Earl Gardner may refer to:

- Earl Gardner (basketball) (1923–2005), American basketball player
- Earl Gardner (musician) (born 1950), American jazz trumpeter
- Earl Gardner (murderer) (1906–1936), Native American serial killer

== See also ==
- Earle Gardner (1884–1943), American professional baseball player
- Erle Stanley Gardner (1889–1970), American lawyer and author of detective stories
