= 1948 Globetrotters–Lakers game =

Basketball match in Chicago

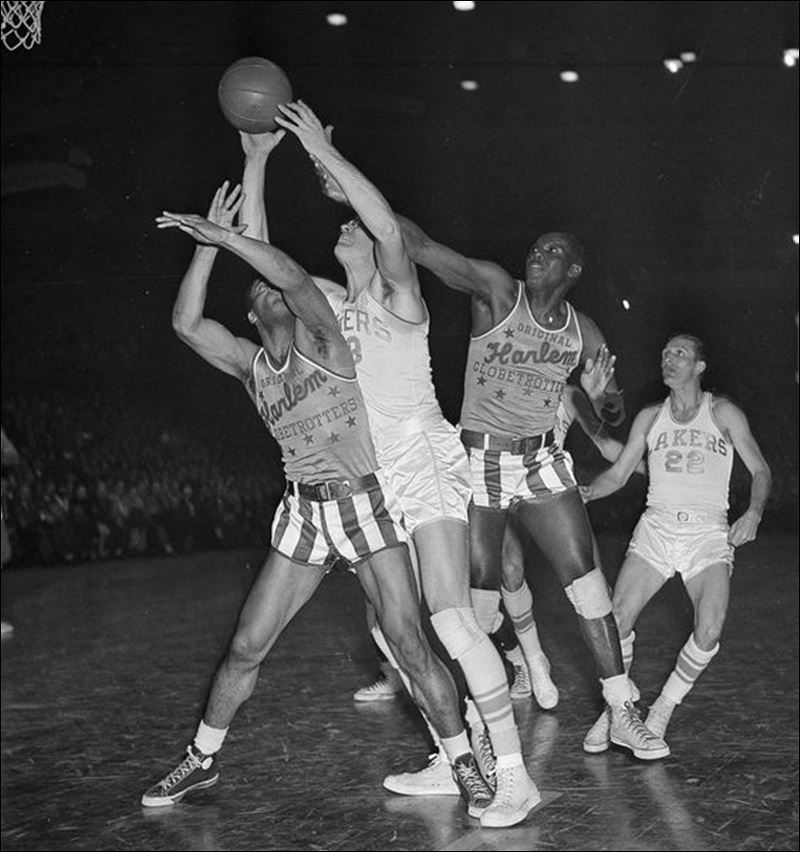
- George Mikan goes up for a shot during the 1948 Lakers–Globetrotters game.
Minneapolis Lakers	Harlem Globetrotters
59	61
	1st half	2nd half	Total
Minneapolis Lakers	32	27	59
Harlem Globetrotters	23	38	61
- Date: February 19, 1948
- Venue: Chicago Stadium, Chicago, Illinois, U.S.
- Coaches: John Kundla; Abe Saperstein
- Referees: William Downes; Tony Sharburo
- Attendance: 17,853

The 1948 Globetrotters–Lakers game was a dramatic match-up between the Harlem Globetrotters and the Minneapolis Lakers. Played in Chicago Stadium, the game took place two years before professional basketball was desegregated. The Globetrotters' 61–59 victory – by two points at the buzzer – challenged prevailing racial stereotypes about the abilities of black athletes.

== Background ==
The idea for the game, which was held on February 19, 1948, was hatched by Globetrotters owner and coach Abe Saperstein and Lakers general manager Max Winter, two friends who both believed they had the best basketball team in the country. Each had good reason to think so. For two decades, the Globetrotters had traveled the country winning game after game. It was because the team was so unbeatable that the players first started clowning around to make the game more interesting. When the Globetrotters arrived at the Chicago Stadium to face the Lakers, they were on a 102-game winning streak.

The Lakers, on the other hand, were technically considered a new team in the National Basketball League, a predecessor league to the present-day National Basketball Association, the roster being formed only six months earlier after the new owners of the squad purchased the Detroit Gems franchise (who had achieved a 4–40 record in their lone season in Detroit) and moved it to Minneapolis, Minnesota to become the newly-established Minneapolis Lakers. Yet despite their early history, they were already on their way to becoming a powerhouse basketball franchise themselves, with two future Hall of Famers leading the way for them to do so: the 6 ft 10 in (2.08 m) center George Mikan, who is described by the NBA as the league's "first superstar", and Jim Pollard, whose leaping ability – being one of the first players that could dunk the basketball from the free-throw line – inspired the nickname, "The Kangaroo Kid".

As a black team, the Globetrotters were not allowed into the NBL or the BAA. A year earlier, Jackie Robinson had broken the color barrier in professional baseball, but basketball remained segregated. Four black basketball players had briefly been on various teams in another league, the National Basketball League. But when a fight between a white player and a black player during a game in Syracuse, New York, triggered a riot in the stands, black players quietly disappeared from the league.

Many sports fans, team owners, and coaches did not want to see teams integrated. Some held the racist view that blacks were not equipped for sports like basketball that required coordination, strategy, and finesse. In 1941, Dean Cromwell, the assistant head coach for the U.S. track team at the 1936 Summer Olympics, which included Jesse Owens, wrote that black athletes excelled in certain events because they were closer to primitive man than white men were.

Racism dominated other aspects of the Globetrotters' lives as well. The night before the game, the team checked into the same small two-story rooming house on the segregated South Side of Chicago that they visited every time they were in town. Called Ma Piersall's, its rooms were tiny, no more than ten feet by ten feet, and featured sagging single beds. Across town, the Lakers spent the night at the popular, luxurious, high-rise Morrison Hotel where a month earlier a black actress had been denied a room and told to find a room in a "South Side hotel for colored people".

== The game ==
A record number of fans showed up at Chicago Stadium to watch the Lakers face off against the Globetrotters. It was an exhibition game played right before the official Basketball Association of America contest between the Chicago Stags and the New York Knicks. Still in its infancy, professional basketball had never attracted more than 9,000 fans in Chicago. That day, nearly 18,000 filled the stadium.

The Globetrotters starting lineup, a combination of the best players from Saperstein's East and West units that toured both the United States of America and the rest of the world, featured Reece "Goose" Tatum, Marques Haynes, Ermer Robinson, Wilbert King, and Louis "Babe" Pressley.

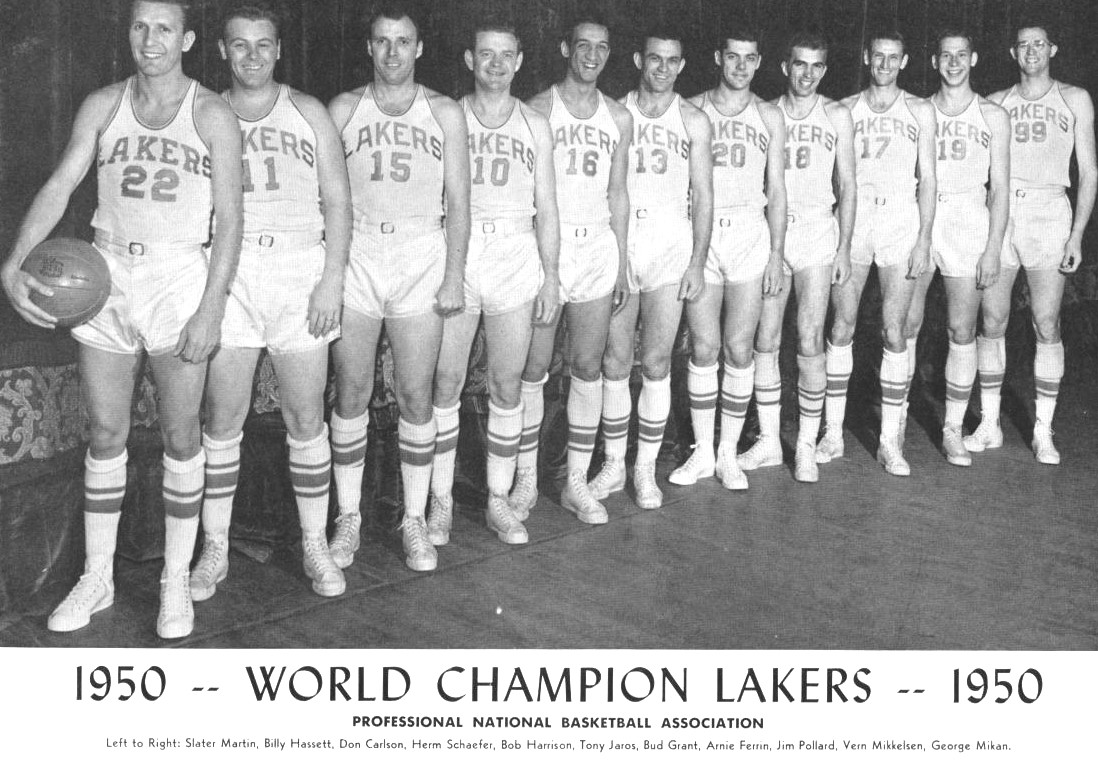
The Minneapolis Lakers circa 1950

During the first half, Laker fans had reason to gloat. Their team quickly jumped to a 9–2 lead. The Lakers held a significant height advantage over the Globetrotters, with several players towering over Tatum, the Globetrotters' star, six-foot-three center, and Haynes, who was barely six feet tall. Tatum turned out to be no match for Mikan, the Lakers' center, who scored 18 points in the first half while preventing Tatum from scoring at all.

At halftime, Minneapolis led 32–23. During the break, Saperstein and his team devised a plan to defend Mikan with two men instead of one. They also decided to do fast break plays each time they got the ball in order to quickly tire the Lakers out during the second half. The Globetrotters knew they were in great shape, having played nearly every night for as long as they could remember. The strategy worked. With both Tatum and Pressley guarding Mikan, he was able to score only 6 points in the second half. The Globetrotters tied the game for the first time in the third quarter. On several occasions they led, only to watch the Lakers come back to tie the score.

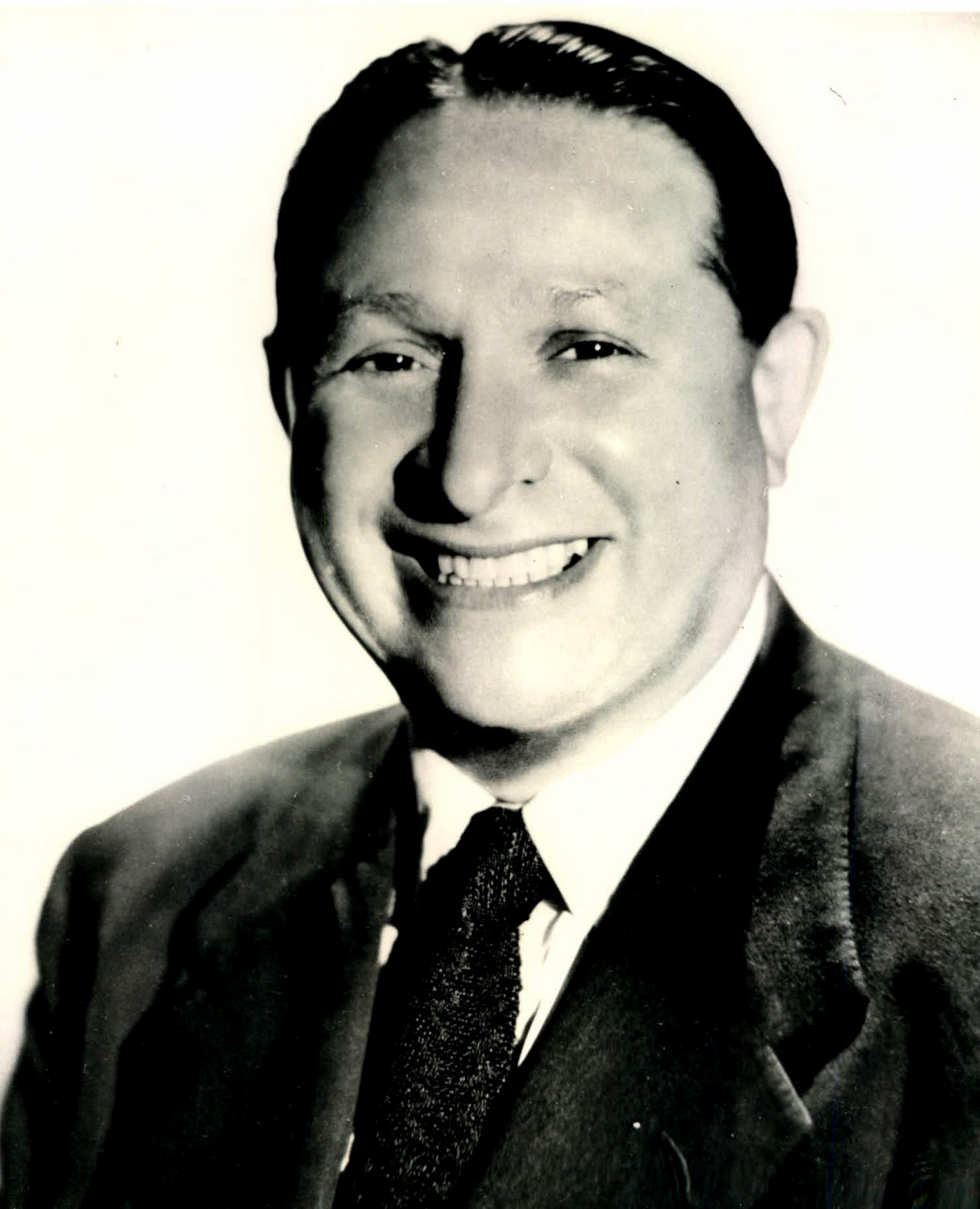
Globetrotters owner Abe Saperstein.

In the final quarter, both Tatum and Pressley fouled out from guarding Mikan so closely. The rest of the team picked up the slack. With 90 seconds left, the Lakers tied the game at 59 with a free throw. When the Globetrotters got the ball, Marques Haynes, who earlier in the game had teased the Lakers by dribbling while lying down on the court, dribbled to run out the clock, since there was no shot clock at the time. This was easy for Haynes: He once dribbled an entire fourth quarter to overcome a two-player handicap and sustain the Globetrotters' one-point lead.

With only a few seconds left, Haynes flipped the ball to Ermer Robinson, who was stationed 30 feet from the basket. Flexing his knees and holding the ball to his chest, Robinson let fly the one-handed shot he had practiced hundreds of times a day on his childhood courts in San Diego. It was the same shot he had already missed three times in a row, and he hadn't sunk any from that far out. But this time the ball went in. Screaming fans poured onto the court. When the Globetrotters reached their locker room, they hoisted Saperstein, who was wearing double-breasted suit and wide tie, onto their shoulders.

A year later, the Lakers and Globetrotters met for a rematch, with the Globetrotters again winning, this time 49–45. The teams met six more times after that, with the Lakers winning each of those games.

== The aftermath ==
The racial implications of the game were not immediately apparent. The Chicago Sun-Times' headline, "Mikan Cooks Tatum's Goose", focused on the fact that the Globetrotter star only scored three baskets. Neither Saperstein nor Winter saw the game as being about race relations; they simply wanted to see which team was best. "I'm positive that he [Abe] didn't see it as a racial game", Gerald Saperstein, a cousin of Abe Saperstein's who was at the game, told the Associated Press.

But to many team owners in the young and struggling basketball leagues, there was a clear message: Not only were black players as talented and capable as white players, they added a level of excitement to the game that appealed to both white and black audiences. To black basketball fans, it was a moment of empowerment. "It just revitalized so many of us, from the fact that [it showed] what we can be", said John Chaney, the former longtime Temple University basketball coach who, in 1948, was a teenager in deeply segregated Jacksonville, Florida.

During the 1948–49 NBL season, after the Detroit Vagabond Kings folded operations early on in their season, they would be replaced for the rest of the season with an all-black team in the Dayton Rens (who were actually the New York Renaissance playing home games in Dayton, Ohio for the rest of that season as a favor for the National Basketball League's sake), which technically not only made the NBL reverse course on their initial decision to quietly remove African American players from the game once again after doing it a season earlier, but also made the Dayton Rens the first integrated professional team to ever join what was previously considered an all-white professional sports league as well (though coverage for the Rens while representing Dayton was less than enthusiastic for them). Unfortunately for the Rens, not only would they miss the final NBL Playoffs ever held due in part to them sharing their record with the original 2–17 record that the Detroit Vagabond Kings team had, but they would also be one of three NBL teams to miss out on the National Basketball League's merger with the Basketball Association of America (alongside the newer Hammond Calumet Buccaneers and longer-lasting Oshkosh All-Stars) to enter what would become the National Basketball Association.

Two years later, in 1950, three former Globetrotters became the first black players on NBA teams. The Boston Celtics drafted Chuck Cooper, the New York Knicks signed center Nat "Sweetwater" Clifton, and the Tri-Cities Blackhawks (now the Atlanta Hawks) took Hank DeZonie.

As basketball became integrated, giving talented black players greater opportunity to play professionally, the Globetrotters had fewer recruits to choose from. Rather than try to compete with the NBA, Abe Saperstein transformed the Globetrotters into a touring act, first against teams of all-star college players around the country and then with ambitious tours of Europe, South America, and the rest of the world. The Globetrotters also expanded their dazzling ball handling and shooting tricks, cementing their reputation as "the magicians of basketball".

The Lakers went on to become an outstanding team, winning six professional basketball titles in the next seven years: 1948 (NBL), 1949 (BAA), 1950 (NBA), 1952 (NBA), 1953 (NBA), 1954 (NBA). When Mikan retired in 1954, the team struggled financially. To boost attendance and revenue, then-owner Bob Short relocated the team to Los Angeles before the 1960–61 season.

Chicago Stadium, the venue of the first Globetrotter-Lakers game, was demolished in 1995. The impact of that game, however, was felt for many years to come. "Those Lakers-Trotters games definitely contributed to the integration of the league", basketball historian Claude Johnson told ESPN.

Stan Bergstein worked for the Globetrotters as announcer and promotions at the time. From his personal collection of photos, this is Marques Haynes, George Mikan, Stan Bergstein and Goose Tatum taken the day of the game.

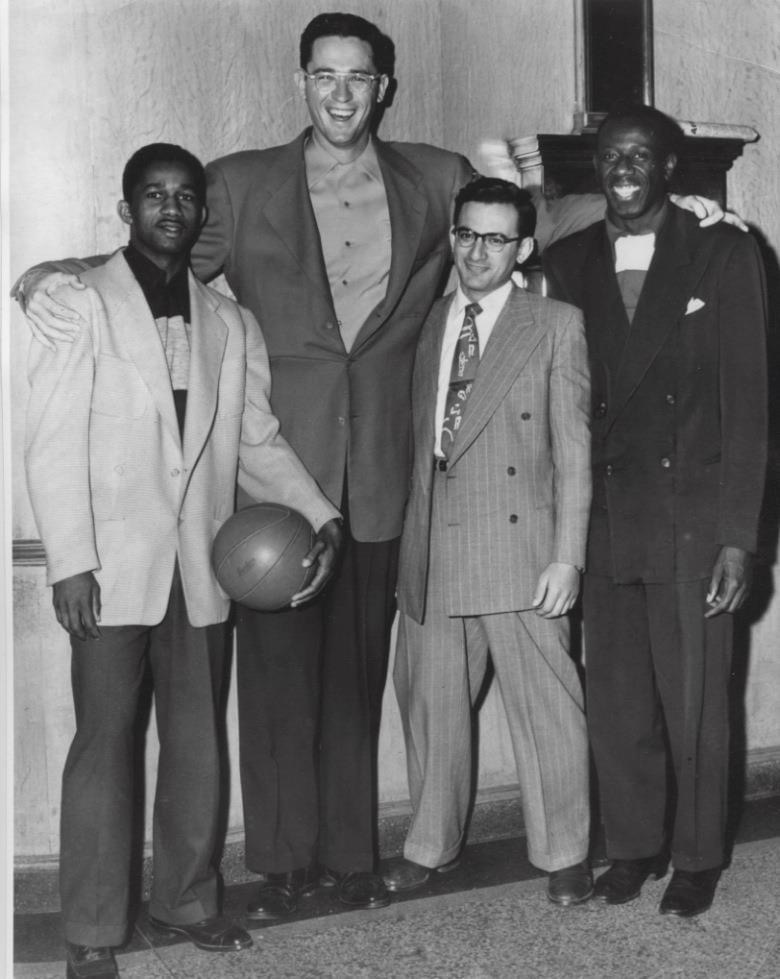
Harlem's Marques Haynes, Minneapolis' George Mikan, announcer Stan Bergstein, and Harlem's Goose Tatum hanging out together in 1948.
