= Donnie Forman =

American basketball player (1926–2018)

Personal information
- Born: January 7, 1926 New York City, New York
- Died: May 10, 2018 (aged 92) Naples, Florida
- Listed height: 5 ft 10 in (1.78 m)
- Listed weight: 175 lb (79 kg)

Career information
- High school: Boys (Brooklyn, New York)
- College: NYU (1944–1948)
- BAA draft: 1948: undrafted
- Playing career: 1948–1949
- Position: Guard
- Number: 22

Career history
- 1948–1949: Minneapolis Lakers

Career highlights
- BAA champion (1949); Third-team All-American – AP (1948)
- Stats at NBA.com
- Stats at Basketball Reference

Donald J. Forman (January 17, 1926 – May 10, 2018) was an American collegiate and professional basketball player.

A 5'10" guard from New York University, Forman played one season (1948–49) in the Basketball Association of America as a member of the Minneapolis Lakers. He averaged 4.1 points per game and won a league championship.

Forman attended Boys High School in Brooklyn where he was teammates on the school's basketball team with Frank Verdi.

== BAA career statistics ==
Legend
GP	Games played	GS	Games started	MPG	Minutes per game
FG%	Field goal percentage	3P%	3-point field goal percentage	FT%	Free throw percentage
RPG	Rebounds per game	APG	Assists per game	SPG	Steals per game
BPG	Blocks per game	PPG	Points per game	**Bold**	Career high
†	Won an NBA championship

=== Regular season ===
Year	Team	GP	FG%	FT%	APG	PPG
1948–49†	Minneapolis	44	.294	.642	1.7	4.1
Career		44	.294	.642	1.7	4.1

=== Playoffs ===
Year	Team	GP	FG%	FT%	APG	PPG
1949†	Minneapolis	9	.150	.636	.8	1.4
Career		9	.150	.636	.8	1.4
