= Whitey Kachan =

American basketball player

Personal information
- Born: September 15, 1925 Chicago, Illinois
- Died: March 7, 1993 (aged 67) Glenview, Illinois
- Listed height: 6 ft 2 in (1.88 m)
- Listed weight: 175 lb (79 kg)

Career information
- High school: Saint Philip (Chicago, Illinois)
- College: DePaul (1943–1948)
- BAA draft: 1948: — round, —
- Drafted by: Chicago Stags
- Playing career: 1948–1949
- Position: Guard
- Number: 4, 20

Career history
- 1948–1949: Chicago Stags
- 1949: Minneapolis Lakers

Career highlights
- BAA champion (1949)

Career BAA statistics
- Points: 112 (2.2 ppg)
- Assists: 37 (0.7 apg)
- Games played: 52
- Stats at NBA.com
- Stats at Basketball Reference

Edwin John "Whitey" Kachan (September 15, 1925 – March 7, 1993) was an American professional basketball player.

A 6'2" guard from DePaul University, Kachan played one season (1948–49) in the Basketball Association of America as a member of the Chicago Stags and Minneapolis Lakers. He averaged 2.2 points per game and won a championship with the Lakers.

== BAA career statistics ==
Legend
| GP | Games played | GS | Games started | MPG | Minutes per game |
| FG% | Field goal percentage | 3P% | 3-point field goal percentage | FT% | Free throw percentage |
| RPG | Rebounds per game | APG | Assists per game | SPG | Steals per game |
| BPG | Blocks per game | PPG | Points per game | **Bold** | Career high |
| † | Won an NBA championship |

=== Regular season ===
| Year | Team | GP | FG% | FT% | APG | PPG |
|---|---|---|---|---|---|---|
| 1948–49 | Chicago | **33** | .220 | .618 | **.8** | 2.0 |
| 1948–49† | Minneapolis | 19 | **.381** | **.682** | .6 | **2.5** |
| Career | | 52 | .268 | .643 | .7 | 2.2 |

=== Playoffs ===
| Year | Team | GP | FG% | FT% | APG | PPG |
|---|---|---|---|---|---|---|
| 1949† | Minneapolis | 8 | .400 | .000 | .3 | .5 |
| Career | | 8 | .400 | .000 | .3 | .5 |
