= Earl Gardner (basketball) =

American basketball player (1923–2005)

Personal information
- Born: September 18, 1923 Ladoga, Indiana, U.S.
- Died: October 16, 2005 (aged 82)
- Listed height: 6 ft 3 in (1.91 m)
- Listed weight: 195 lb (88 kg)

Career information
- High school: New Market (New Market, Indiana)
- College: DePauw (1944–1948)
- NBA draft: 1948: – round, –
- Drafted by: Minneapolis Lakers
- Playing career: 1948–1949
- Position: Small forward / power forward
- Number: 14

Career history
- 1948–1949: Minneapolis Lakers

Career highlights
- BAA champion (1949)

Career statistics
- Points: 89 (1.8 ppg)
- Assists: 19 (0.4 ppg)
- Games played: 50
- Stats at NBA.com
- Stats at Basketball Reference

Earl Barton Gardner Jr. (September 18, 1923 – October 15, 2005) was an American professional basketball player.

A 6-foot-3-inch (1.91 m) forward from DePauw University, Gardner played one season which started as the BAA and ended as the NBA (1948–49) in the Basketball Association of America as a member of the Minneapolis Lakers. He averaged 1.8 points per game and was on the first team to win the NBA World Championship title.

After leading the New Market Flyers to 3 consecutive county titles, he graduated Valedictorian from New Market High School in 1941. He attended Wabash College for a while, and then enlisted in the U.S. Navy where he became an Ensign assigned to the USS Cassin. In 1946, he enrolled at DePauw University to complete his bachelor's degree. Later he received his master's degree from Indiana University.

Twice while at DePauw, he was named Little All-American, he led the Depauw Tigers in scoring for three seasons, scoring 683 points. After his professional playing, he entered the high coaching ranks and spent 23 years as Varsity Basketball Coach and 33 years as a guidance counselor and teacher.

== BAA career statistics ==
Legend
GP	Games played	GS	Games started	MPG	Minutes per game
FG%	Field goal percentage	3P%	3-point field goal percentage	FT%	Free throw percentage
RPG	Rebounds per game	APG	Assists per game	SPG	Steals per game
BPG	Blocks per game	PPG	Points per game	**Bold**	Career high
†	Won an NBA championship

=== Regular season ===
Year	Team	GP	FG%	FT%	APG	PPG
1948–49†	Minneapolis	50	.376	.464	.4	1.8
Career		50	.376	.464	.4	1.8

=== Playoffs ===
Year	Team	GP	FG%	FT%	APG	PPG
1949†	Minneapolis	7	.111	.500	.1	.6
Career		7	.111	.500	.1	.6
