= Johnny Jorgensen =

American basketball player

Personal information
- Born: December 28, 1921 Chicago, Illinois, U.S.
- Died: January 19, 1973 (aged 51) Charlotte, North Carolina, U.S.
- Listed height: 6 ft 2 in (1.88 m)
- Listed weight: 185 lb (84 kg)

Career information
- Playing career: 1947–1949
- Position: Guard / forward
- Number: 0, 16

Career history
- 1947–1948: Chicago Stags
- 1947–1948: Baltimore Bullets
- 1948–1949: Minneapolis Lakers

Career highlights
- BAA champion (1949); NBL champion (1948)
- Stats at NBA.com
- Stats at Basketball Reference

John Jay Jorgensen (December 28, 1921 – January 19, 1973) was an American professional basketball player.

A 6'2" guard/forward, Jorgensen played two seasons (1947–1949) in the Basketball Association of America as a member of the Chicago Stags, Baltimore Bullets, and Minneapolis Lakers. He averaged 2.3 points per game in his BAA career and won a championship with the Lakers in 1949. He also played in the National Basketball League.

Jorgensen played on the freshman team of the DePaul Blue Demons during the 1941–42 season.

== BAA career statistics ==
Legend
GP	Games played	GS	Games started	MPG	Minutes per game
FG%	Field goal percentage	3P%	3-point field goal percentage	FT%	Free throw percentage
RPG	Rebounds per game	APG	Assists per game	SPG	Steals per game
BPG	Blocks per game	PPG	Points per game	**Bold**	Career high
†	Won an NBA championship

=== Regular season ===
Year	Team	GP	FG%	FT%	APG	PPG
1947–48	Chicago	1	**1.000**	.000	.0	**4.0**
1947–48	Baltimore	2	.286	**1.000**	.0	2.5
1948–49†	Minneapolis	**48**	.360	.727	**.7**	2.2
Career		51	.366	.735	.6	2.3

=== Playoffs ===
Year	Team	GP	FG%	FT%	APG	PPG
1949†	Minneapolis	6	.429	1.000	.0	1.2
Career		6	.429	1.000	.0	1.2
