= Jack Dwan =

American basketball player (1921–1993)

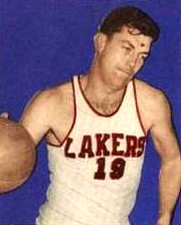
- Dwan in 1948

Personal information
- Born: May 3, 1921 Tulsa, Oklahoma, U.S.
- Died: August 4, 1993 (aged 72)
- Listed height: 6 ft 4 in (1.93 m)
- Listed weight: 200 lb (91 kg)

Career information
- High school: Senn (Chicago, Illinois)
- College: Loyola Chicago (1944–1947)
- BAA draft: 1947: undrafted
- Playing career: 1947–1949
- Position: Forward / guard
- Number: 19

Career history
- 1947: St. Paul Saints
- 1947–1949: Minneapolis Lakers

Career highlights
- BAA champion (1949); NBL champion (1948)
- Stats at NBA.com
- Stats at Basketball Reference

John P. Dwan (May 3, 1921 – August 4, 1993) was an American professional basketball player.

A 6-foot-4-inch (1.93 m) forward/guard from Loyola University Chicago, Dwan played two seasons (1947–49) in the National Basketball League and Basketball Association of America as a member of the Minneapolis Lakers. He won a NBL championship in 1948 and a BAA championship in 1949.

== BAA career statistics ==
Legend
GP	Games played	GS	Games started	MPG	Minutes per game
FG%	Field goal percentage	3P%	3-point field goal percentage	FT%	Free throw percentage
RPG	Rebounds per game	APG	Assists per game	SPG	Steals per game
BPG	Blocks per game	PPG	Points per game	**Bold**	Career high
†	Won an NBA championship

=== Regular season ===
Year	Team	GP	FG%	FT%	APG	PPG
1948–49†	Minneapolis	60	.318	.493	2.2	4.6
Career		60	.318	.493	2.2	4.6

=== Playoffs ===
Year	Team	GP	FG%	FT%	APG	PPG
1949†	Minneapolis	10	.241	.444	.9	1.8
Career		10	.241	.444	.9	1.8
