= Trimble County High School =

Public High School in Bedford, Kentucky

Coordinates: 38°36′31″N 85°19′23″W

Trimble County Junior/Senior High School

Location
- 1029 Highway 421 North; Bedford, (Trimble County), Kentucky 40006; United States

Information
- Type: Public high school
- Established: 1876
- School district: Trimble County Schools
- Principal: Kerrie Stewart
- Staff: 32.00 (FTE)
- Enrollment: 553 (2023-2024)
- Student to teacher ratio: 17.28
- Colors: Royal blue and gold
- Nickname: Raiders

Trimble County Junior/Senior High School (TCHS) is a Kentucky high school located on highway 421 in Bedford, Kentucky in Trimble County, Kentucky. Its current enrollment for the 2006–07 academic year is estimated at 504 students.

== History ==
Trimble County High School was founded in 1876. In 1883 the term was 40 weeks. Tuition for the high school was $30.00 and boarding was provided on Monday-Friday for a fee of $80.

In 1903, Bedford High School was established, but later became part of TCHS. In 1952 Milton High School, whose first graduating class was in 1923, was consolidated into Trimble County High School.

In 2016, the high school, housed in a building originally built as Bedford Elementary in 1962, was ranked the worst high school facility in the state according to the Parson's Report. Enrollment had been trending downward for several years, resulting in a reduced amount of SEEK funding by the state of Kentucky.

As of 1920, 16 units were required for graduation. The curriculum included 31 classes including Algebra, Mediaeval History, Botany, English, Physics, and Business.

In 2015, it was proposed to split the middle school and high school into separate locations. Plans were made to create a 20-person committee of constituents, including parents, administrators, teachers and other staffs to investigate options.

In 2022, the Trimble County Board of Education finalized plans to fund an $8 million expansion of the school, and approved a final bid to build the project. A $6 million bond issue was approved, and was not expected to cause a tax increase.

In 2021, 2022, and 2023, TCHS won state championships in the Student Technology Leadership Program. They have gone on to compete at the national level.

== Demographics ==
As of the 2021–2022 school year, the school had an enrollment in grades 7-12 of 558. Of these, 3 were Asian, 2 were Black, 23 were Hispanic, 1 was Native Hawaiian/Pacific Islander, 520 were White, and 9 were of two or more races. 261, or 47% were eligible for free lunches.

== Athletics ==
The school won the state championship in Cross Country in 1954. After the consolidation of Milton and Bedford schools the sports teams used the name Blue Demons. The colors, borrowed from the Blue Demons of Bedford, were blue and white. The Milton Panthers had worn black and gold. The new school chose blue and gold from these. In January 1955, the student body voted Raiders as the school mascot, after Morgan's Raiders, a Confederate Army outfit. In 2018, the school cancelled the football season due to a lack of student interest.

== Notable alumni ==
Jack Tingle, NCAA basketball player, NBA professional basketball player.
