= Bill Durkee =

American basketball player (1921–2006)

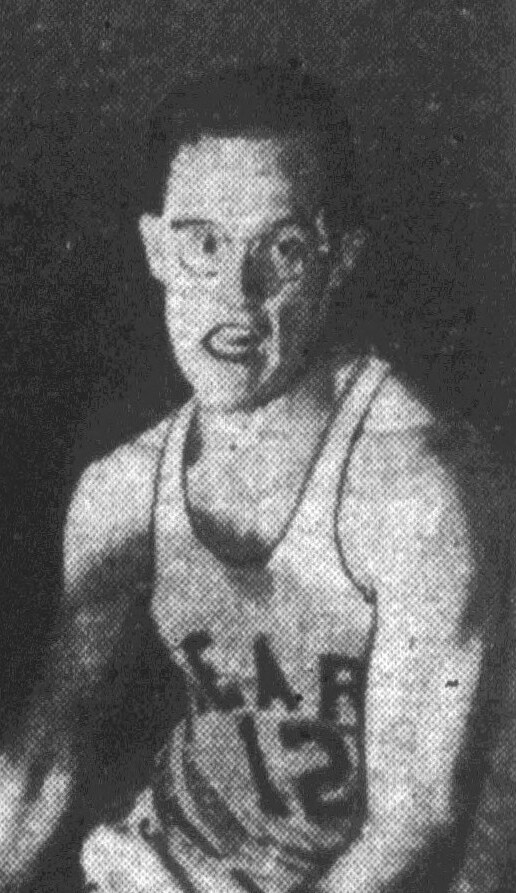
- Durkee, circa 1947

Personal information
- Born: July 14, 1921 Oakland, California
- Died: April 3, 2006 (aged 84) Las Vegas, Nevada
- Listed height: 6 ft 3 in (1.91 m)
- Listed weight: 205 lb (93 kg)

Career information
- High school: Berkeley (Berkeley, California)
- College: California (1940–1942, 1946–1947)
- NBA draft: 1947: undrafted
- Position: Guard / forward

Career history
- 1947–1948: Minneapolis Lakers

Wilfred L. "Bill" Durkee Jr. (July 14, 1921 – April 3, 2006) was an American professional basketball player. He played for the Minneapolis Lakers in the National Basketball League during the 1947–48 season.

Durkee attended the University of California, Berkeley and competed for their football, basketball, and track teams. His collegiate career was interrupted by World War II, where he was stationed in the Pacific. In 1954 he moved to Las Vegas, Nevada and worked at a nuclear test site.
