= Joe Patanelli =

American basketball and baseball player (1919–1998)

Personal information
- Born: September 18, 1919 Elkhart, Indiana, U.S.
- Died: August 18, 1998 (aged 78) Elkhart, Indiana, U.S.
- Listed height: 6 ft 3 in (1.91 m)
- Listed weight: 205 lb (93 kg)

Career information
- High school: Elkhart (Elkhart, Indiana)
- Position: Forward

Career history
- 1946–1947: Toledo Jeeps
- 1947: Minneapolis Lakers
- 1947–1948: Kansas City Blues

Joseph Mathew Patanelli (September 18, 1919 – August 18, 1998) was an American professional basketball and minor league baseball player. He played for the Toledo Jeeps and Minneapolis Lakers in the National Basketball League and averaged 3.6 points per game. He also played for the Kansas City Blues in the Professional Basketball League of America during the 1947–48 season.

Patanelli was offered an athletic scholarship to play football for Indiana University but did not finish his education, having to return home following the death of his father. He never played for the school's basketball team.

In addition to basketball, Patanelli played minor league baseball for four years – three for Chicago White Sox-affiliated teams, and one affiliated with the Cincinnati Reds. He competed for the Wisconsin Rapids White Sox (1946), Fall River Indians (1947), Superior Blues (1948), and Rockford Rox (1948). In 368 career games, Patanelli batted .258 and hit 16 home runs.

His older brother was Matt Patanelli, a standout football player for the University of Michigan.
