= Warren Ajax =

American basketball player

Personal information
- Born: May 12, 1921 Minneapolis, Minnesota
- Died: December 19, 2004 (aged 83) Hot Springs, Arkansas
- Listed height: 6 ft 2 in (1.88 m)
- Listed weight: 170 lb (77 kg)

Career information
- High school: Central (Minneapolis, Minnesota)
- College: Minnesota (1940–1943, 1945–1946)
- Position: Forward / center

Career history
- 1947: Minneapolis Lakers
- 1949–1950: Oskey's North Stars

Warren Julius Ajax (May 12, 1921 – December 19, 2004) was an American professional basketball player. He played in the National Basketball League for the Minneapolis Lakers during the 1947–48 season and averaged 0.3 points per game.
