= 1949 BAA Finals =

1949 basketball championship series

Team	Coach	Wins
Minneapolis Lakers	John Kundla	4
Washington Capitols	Red Auerbach	2
- Dates: April 4–13
- Hall of Famers: Lakers: George Mikan (1959); Jim Pollard (1978); Coaches: Red Auerbach (1969); John Kundla (1995)
- Eastern finals: Capitols defeated Knickerbockers, 2–1
- Western finals: Lakers defeated Royals, 2–0

The 1949 BAA Finals was the championship round following the Basketball Association of America (BAA)'s 1948–49 season, its third and last. Later that year, the BAA and National Basketball League merged to create the National Basketball Association (NBA).

6'10" George Mikan and the Minneapolis Lakers proved dominant. They routed the Washington Capitols in six games. This was the first of several successive NBA titles for the Lakers. It was the beginning of the George Mikan and the Lakers Dynasty. This was the first professional sports championship ever won by a Minneapolis-St. Paul-based team.

As for the Capitols, they would never reach the Finals again, but their coach in Red Auerbach would do so several times over the next two decades, and this represented his only loss in a Final until 1958 (Auerbach would win nine of his eleven appearances in a Final); this would be the first of six overall finals that featured Auerbach against the Lakers, for which he beat them five times, including in 1959 when he beat Kundla in his last game as head coach of the Lakers.

The six games of the final series were played in ten days – Monday, April 4, to Wednesday, April 13 – with one day off except after game three, the first of three played in Washington (Minneapolis led 3–0). Prior to its start, however, Minneapolis had been idle for five days, having qualified on the preceding Tuesday; Washington idle for only one day, having qualified on Saturday. The entire playoff tournament extended 23 days.

== Series summary ==
Game	Date	Home team	Result	Road team
Game 1	April 4	Minneapolis Lakers	88–84 (1–0)	Washington Capitols
Game 2	April 6	Minneapolis Lakers	76–62 (2–0)	Washington Capitols
Game 3	April 8	Washington Capitols	74–94 (0–3)	Minneapolis Lakers
Game 4	April 9	Washington Capitols	83–71 (1–3)	Minneapolis Lakers
Game 5	April 11	Washington Capitols	74–65 (2–3)	Minneapolis Lakers
Game 6	April 13	Minneapolis Lakers	77–56 (4–2)	Washington Capitols

Lakers win series 4–2

== Team rosters ==
=== Minneapolis Lakers ===
1948–49 Minneapolis Lakers roster
Players

Pos.	No.	Player	Height	Weight	DOB	From
F/C	11	Mike Bloom	6 ft 6 in (1.98 m)	190 lb (86 kg)	1915-01-14	Temple
G/F	15	Don Carlson	6 ft 0 in (1.83 m)	170 lb (77 kg)	1919-03-22	Minnesota
G/F	19	Jack Dwan	6 ft 4 in (1.93 m)	200 lb (91 kg)	1921-05-03	Loyola Chicago
C	18	Ray Ellefson	6 ft 8 in (2.03 m)	230 lb (104 kg)	1922-11-18	West Texas A&M
G/F	18	Arnie Ferrin	6 ft 2 in (1.88 m)	180 lb (82 kg)	1925-07-29	Utah
G	22	Donnie Forman	5 ft 10 in (1.78 m)	175 lb (79 kg)	1926-01-17	NYU
F	14	Earl Gardner	6 ft 3 in (1.91 m)	195 lb (88 kg)	1923-09-18	DePauw
G/F	13	Tony Jaros	6 ft 3 in (1.91 m)	185 lb (84 kg)	1920-02-22	Minnesota
G/F	16	Johnny Jorgensen	6 ft 2 in (1.88 m)	185 lb (84 kg)	1921-12-28	DePaul
G	20	Whitey Kachan	6 ft 2 in (1.88 m)	175 lb (79 kg)	1925-09-15	DePaul
C	99	George Mikan	6 ft 10 in (2.08 m)	245 lb (111 kg)	1924-06-18	DePaul
SF	17	Jim Pollard	6 ft 4 in (1.93 m)	185 lb (84 kg)	1922-07-09	Stanford
G/F	24	Herm Schaefer	6 ft 0 in (1.83 m)	175 lb (79 kg)	1918-12-20	Indiana
G/F	12	Don Smith	6 ft 2 in (1.88 m)	190 lb (86 kg)	1920-07-27	Minnesota
F	19	Jack Tingle	6 ft 4 in (1.93 m)	205 lb (93 kg)	1924-12-30	Kentucky

Coaches
Head coach

John Kundla

Legend
- (DP) Unsigned draft pick
- (FA) Free agent
- (S) Suspended
- Injured

Roster

=== Washington Capitols ===
1948–49 Washington Capitols roster
Players

Pos.	No.	Player	Height	Weight	DOB	From
G/F	10	Bob Feerick	6 ft 3 in (1.91 m)	190 lb (86 kg)	1920-01-02	Santa Clara
F/C	11	Kleggie Hermsen	6 ft 9 in (2.06 m)	225 lb (102 kg)	1923-03-12	Minnesota
G	29	Sonny Hertzberg	5 ft 10 in (1.78 m)	175 lb (79 kg)	1922-07-29	CCNY
G	23	Leo Katkaveck	6 ft 0 in (1.83 m)	185 lb (84 kg)	1923-04-17	NC State
SF	17	Bones McKinney	6 ft 6 in (1.98 m)	185 lb (84 kg)	1919-01-01	North Carolina
PF	15	Jack Nichols	6 ft 7 in (2.01 m)	222 lb (101 kg)	1926-04-09	Washington
F	16	Johnny Norlander	6 ft 3 in (1.91 m)	180 lb (82 kg)	1921-03-05	Hamline
G/F	13	Dick O'Keefe	6 ft 2 in (1.88 m)	185 lb (84 kg)	1923-09-29	Santa Clara
G/F	22	Dick Schulz	6 ft 2 in (1.88 m)	192 lb (87 kg)	1917-01-03	Wisconsin
PG	20	Fred Scolari	5 ft 10 in (1.78 m)	180 lb (82 kg)	1922-03-01	San Francisco
F/C	15	Jack Toomay	6 ft 6 in (1.98 m)	215 lb (98 kg)	1922-08-09	Pacific
G/F	18	Matt Zunic	6 ft 3 in (1.91 m)	195 lb (88 kg)	1919-12-19	George Washington

Coaches
Head coach

Red Auerbach

Legend
- (DP) Unsigned draft pick
- (FA) Free agent
- (S) Suspended
- Injured

Roster

== Box scores ==
April 4

Boxscore

Washington Capitols 84, Minneapolis Lakers 88
Scoring by quarter: 13–23, 27–25, 21–19, 23–21
Pts: Fred Scolari 20	Pts: George Mikan 42
Minneapolis leads series, 1–0

Minneapolis Auditorium, Minneapolis, Minnesota
Attendance: 8,210

April 6

Boxscore

Washington Capitols 62, Minneapolis Lakers 76
Scoring by quarter: 13–20, 19–27, 13–11, 17–18
Pts: Sonny Hertzberg 13	Pts: Don Carlson 16
Minneapolis leads series, 2–0

Minneapolis Auditorium, Minneapolis, Minnesota
Attendance: 10,212
Referees: Pat Kennedy, Phil Fox

April 8

Boxscore

Minneapolis Lakers 94, Washington Capitols 74
Scoring by quarter: 26–14, 17–15, 28–24, 23–21
Pts: George Mikan 35	Pts: Nichols, Zunic 12 each
Minneapolis leads series, 3–0

Uline Arena, Washington, D.C.
Attendance: 4,919

April 9

Boxscore

Minneapolis Lakers 71, Washington Capitols 83
Scoring by quarter: 23–22, 12–23, 16–20, 20–18
Pts: George Mikan 27	Pts: Jack Nichols 27
Minneapolis leads series, 3–1

Uline Arena, Washington, D.C.
Attendance: 4,471

April 11

Boxscore

Minneapolis Lakers 65, Washington Capitols 74
Scoring by quarter: 12–22, 18–19, 22–15, 13–18
Pts: George Mikan 22	Pts: Hermsen, Nichols 13 each
Minneapolis leads series, 3–2

Uline Arena, Washington, D.C.
Attendance: 3,840

April 13

Boxscore

Washington Capitols 56, Minneapolis Lakers 77
Scoring by quarter: 12–19, 12–21, 17–22, 15–15
Pts: Kleggie Hermsen 12	Pts: George Mikan 29
Minneapolis wins series, 4–2

St. Paul Auditorium, Saint Paul, Minnesota
Attendance: 10,482
