= Ken Exel =

American basketball player

Personal information
- Born: September 12, 1920 Minneapolis, Minnesota, U.S.
- Died: July 7, 2006 (aged 85) Brooklyn Center, Minnesota, U.S.
- Listed height: 6 ft 1 in (1.85 m)
- Listed weight: 178 lb (81 kg)

Career information
- High school: Roosevelt (Minneapolis, Minnesota)
- College: Minnesota (1940–1943)
- Position: Guard

Career history
- 1944–1945: Hartford Nutmegs
- 1945–1946: Hartford Pros
- 1946–1947: Oshkosh All-Stars
- 1947: Syracuse Nationals
- 1947–1948: Minneapolis Lakers

Kenneth Arnold Exel (September 12, 1920 – July 7, 2006) was an American professional basketball player. He played for the Oshkosh All-Stars, Syracuse Nationals, and Minneapolis Lakers in the National Basketball League during the 1940s. For his career he averaged 1.8 points per game.
