= Stan Bergstein =

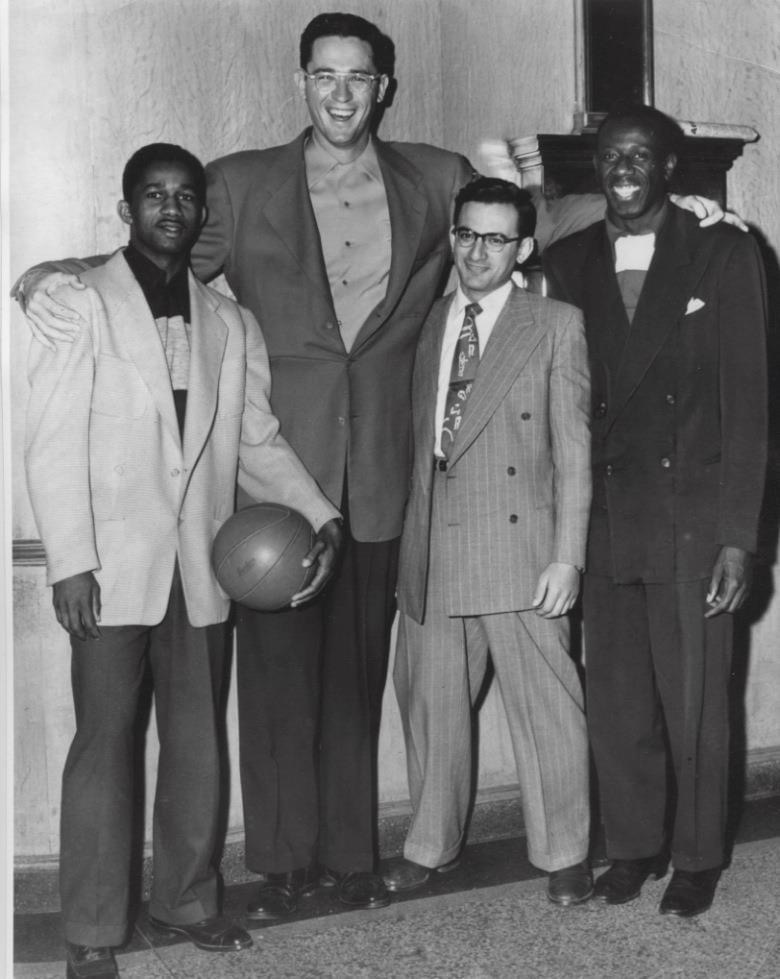
Stan Bergstein (furthest right), 1948

Stanley F. Bergstein (June 19, 1924 – November 2, 2011) was an American sports executive. He was the executive vice president of the Harness Tracks of America from 1961 to 2011. He was the first person to be inducted into both the United States Harness Racing Hall of Fame and its Communicator's Hall of Fame.

Bergstein died on November 2, 2011, after suffering from health problems for a year. He died only nine months after he retired as vice president. He is survived by his two children, Al and Lisa and four grandsons. His wife, June, died in 2010, four days after their 60th wedding anniversary.

Born above a grocery store in Pottsville, Pennsylvania, to the grocer Milton and his wife Esther, on 19 June 1924 and died in his home in Tucson, Arizona, on 2 November 2011 at the age of 87.

The most accurate obituary this writer has seen appears to be from the Chicago Tribune. (the article is now behind a paywall. You need to have a subscription with the Tribune to access it).

Also, Stan wrote a detailed article on his career before 1970 that was republished in the 9 November 2011 "Horseman and Fair World" (which is not yet available on the Internet as of this writing).

Served in WWII landing on Omaha Beach a few days after DDay. Fought across Normandy with Patton's Army. Fought in the Battle of the Bulge. Was injured and received the Purple Heart.

After returning from the war, graduated from Northwestern's Medill School of Journalism.

Worked in public relations for a variety of harness racing tracks in the 1940s. Also spent time as announcer and car driver, PR and other activities with the Harlem Globetrotters from approximately 1948 to 1952.

Married the model June Hanna in 1950. They had a son Alfred (b. 1953) and daughter, Lisa (b.1956).

In 1961 he helped create Harness Tracks of America, a trade group representing race track owners. He originally held the title of Executive Secretary, but also ran day-to-day operations for the organization. He held both that position and that of Executive Vice President until his retirement in February 2011, at which time he took the position of President Emeritus.

In 1968, he additionally joined, as the vice president of publicity and public relations, the U.S. Trotting Association, the governing body of the standardbred sport. He also became editor of the USTA's award-winning monthly magazine, HoofBeats.

In the 1950s, he worked as an announcer at many race tracks around America, including Sportsman's Part and Maywood Park in Chicago, Santa Anita in Los Angeles, and numerous other tracks. He also appeared on television as both color commentator and announcer for such premiere race events as The Little Brown Jug, and The Hambeltonian, later in his career.

Bergstein was also a reader of horse pedigrees, which is a specialized skill requiring a knowledge of horse lineage. He was hired by major auctioneers, such as the late George Swinebroad and others, at the fall sales events in Lexington, Kentucky; Harrisburg Pennsylvania and other locations. Eventually he became a certified auctioneer, and ran his own sales for a couple of years in the 1970s.

He also ran a small bookstore specializing in harness horse books and magazines, out of his home, eventually compiling one of the largest private collections of books on the subject, according to Stan's knowledge of other booksellers and private collectors. He sold the bulk of the library in the 1980s to a buyer from Sweden.

In the 1970s and into the 1980s he was co-anchor on a television show on WOR-TV in New York City, broadcasting harness racing in conjunction with the State's then new Off Track Betting industry.

He ended his working relationship with USTA in the mid-1970s, but remained a close business associate with the organization until his death.

In the 1970s he created the "World Driving Championship", yearly series of races from top drivers and horses from around the world. The Driving Championship would take the drivers and horses to races in Europe, Australia, United States and Canada, among other countries.

Bergstein also created a yearly convention of the harness racing industry, managing the event. He was a keynote speaker, and also was master of ceremonies at many annual events over the decades.

Bergstein owned a series of harness horses during his life, and also was partner in a number of horse breeding operations.

Moved with his wife June to Tucson Arizona in the 1980s, moving the offices of HTA there as well.

Created a relationship between HTA and the University of Arizona's racing industry studies program, and strove to hire its graduates to his organization. Many of his hires went on to significant roles in the harness and thoroughbred racing industry. His ‘graduates’ include: Christopher McErlean - Vice President at Penn National Gaming, Inc.; Tammy A. Gantt - Associate Vice President at Florida Thoroughbred Breeders’ & Owners’ Association and Industry and Community Relations at Florida Thoroughbred Charities; Steve May - Executive Director, Minnesota Racing Commission; Maury Wolff – top gaming expert and speaker; Jennifer Foley, Manager of Marketing & Communications at Arizona Community Foundation; Paul Estok, Attorney at law; Wade Turner, a Fort Collins, Colorado based award-winning leader dedicated to improving education who was responsible for marketing, communications, advocacy, education, strategic planning, and product development for the equine industry at Arizona Dept. of Racing, North American Pari-Mutuel Regulators Association (founder), product development at TVG, Racing Resource Group, The Racing Times, the American Horse Council, and Rosecroft and Freehold Raceways special projects; Delight Craddock, owner of Smokin’ C Miniature Performance Horses in Arizona; and Sable Joseph, Attorney at law in West Des Moines, Iowa; among others.

Health problems and the natural aging process led him to retire from HTA in February 2011. He was still writing a number of weekly columns for various journals at the time of his death.
