= John Kundla =

American basketball player and coach (1916–2017)

- Kundla in 2014

Personal information
- Born: July 3, 1916 Star Junction, Pennsylvania, U.S.
- Died: July 23, 2017 (aged 101) Minneapolis, Minnesota, U.S.
- Listed height: 6 ft 2 in (1.88 m)
- Listed weight: 180 lb (82 kg)

Career information
- High school: Central (Minneapolis, Minnesota)
- College: Minnesota (1936–1939)
- Coaching career: 1946–1968

Career highlights
- NBL champion (1948); 5× BAA/NBA champion (1949, 1950, 1952–1954); WPBT champion (1948); 4× NBA All-Star Game head coach (1951–1954); Top 10 Coaches in NBA History

Career coaching record
- BAA & NBA: 423–302 (.583)
- College: 121–116 (.511)
- Record at Basketball Reference
- Basketball Hall of Fame
- Collegiate Basketball Hall of Fame

John Albert Kundla (July 3, 1916 – July 23, 2017) was an American college and professional basketball coach. He was the first head coach for the Minneapolis Lakers of the National Basketball Association (NBA) and its predecessors, the Basketball Association of America (BAA) and the National Basketball League (NBL), serving 12 seasons, from 1947 to 1959. His teams won six league championships, one in the NBL, one in the BAA, and four in the NBA. Kundla was the head basketball coach at the University of St. Thomas in Saint Paul for one season in 1946–47, and at the University of Minnesota for ten seasons, from 1959 to 1968. He was inducted into the Naismith Memorial Basketball Hall of Fame in 1995 and the College Basketball Hall of Fame in 2006.

== Early life ==
Kundla was born in the mining town of Star Junction, Pennsylvania to parents from Jakubany, at that time Austria-Hungary, now Slovakia. He moved to Minneapolis at age 5. He attended Central High School in Minneapolis.

== Playing career ==
After attending and playing basketball for Minneapolis Central High School (which closed in 1982), Kundla attended the University of Minnesota and was a standout for the Minnesota Golden Gophers basketball in the late 1930s.

In 1939, Kundla played a partial season of minor league baseball. He batted .314 with 9 home runs in 57 games playing first base for the Paducah Indians in the Class D level Kitty League.

== Coaching career ==
Following graduation, Kundla stayed on at the university as an assistant coach to Dave MacMillan. He then moved to the high school ranks as the head coach of DeLaSalle High School in Minneapolis, Minnesota. After two years there, the United States entered World War II, and Kundla joined the Navy, where he was assigned to LST units in both the European and Pacific theaters. After the war, he was hired to coach the College of St. Thomas in 1946.

=== Minneapolis Lakers (1947–1959) ===
Following the St. Paul's College of St. Thomas Tommies' 1946–47 season, the new professional franchise in town, the Minneapolis Lakers of the National Basketball League extended an offer to Kundla to coach the team. Kundla turned the offer down, however, as he was not impressed with the professional ranks. Team representatives returned, and this time the offer had been upped to $6,000 (twice his St. Thomas salary) and Kundla took the job at age 31.

Kundla and the Lakers were immediately successful. A month into the 1947–48 season, future Hall of Fame center George Mikan became available when the Chicago American Gears, folded. Outhustling the rest of the NBL and the teams of the rival Basketball Association of America (BAA), the predecessor of the National Basketball Association (NBA), the Lakers signed Mikan. In a span of a week in April 1948, Kundla guided the George Mikan-led Lakers, which also included star Jim Pollard, to both the World Professional Basketball Tournament title and the NBL title. In the NBL finals, the Lakers defeated the Washington Capitols and Coach Red Auerbach in the 1949 BAA Finals 4 games to 2.

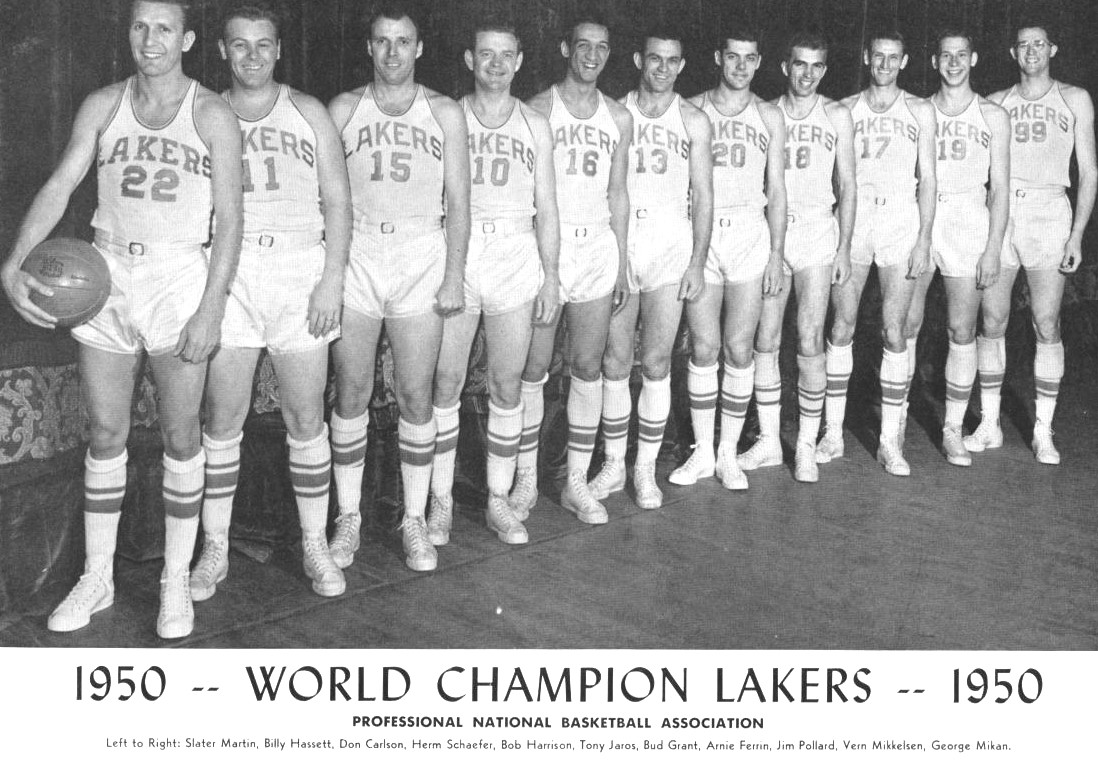
1950 NBA Champion Minneapolis Lakers

Moving to the BAA for the 1948–49 season, which became the NBA in 1949–50, Kundla's Lakers won five NBA titles in six years, with 1951 being the only gap in the team's run, a season in which Mikan broke his ankle at the end of the campaign, thus allowing the Rochester Royals to defeat the Lakers in the Western Conference championship series three games to one. The first team to repeat as league champions then became the first team to three-peat, with Mikan fully healed for the 1951–52, 1952–53, and 1953–54 seasons.

Kunlda's Lakers rosters included Naismith Basketball Hall of Fame players Mikan, Pollard, Slater Martin, Vern Mikkelsen, Clyde Lovellette, Slick Leonard, Hot Rod Hundley and Elgin Baylor, as well as Arnie Ferrin, Walter Dukes, Dick Garmaker, Frank Selvy and future Pro Football Hall of Famer and Minnesota Vikings Coach Bud Grant.

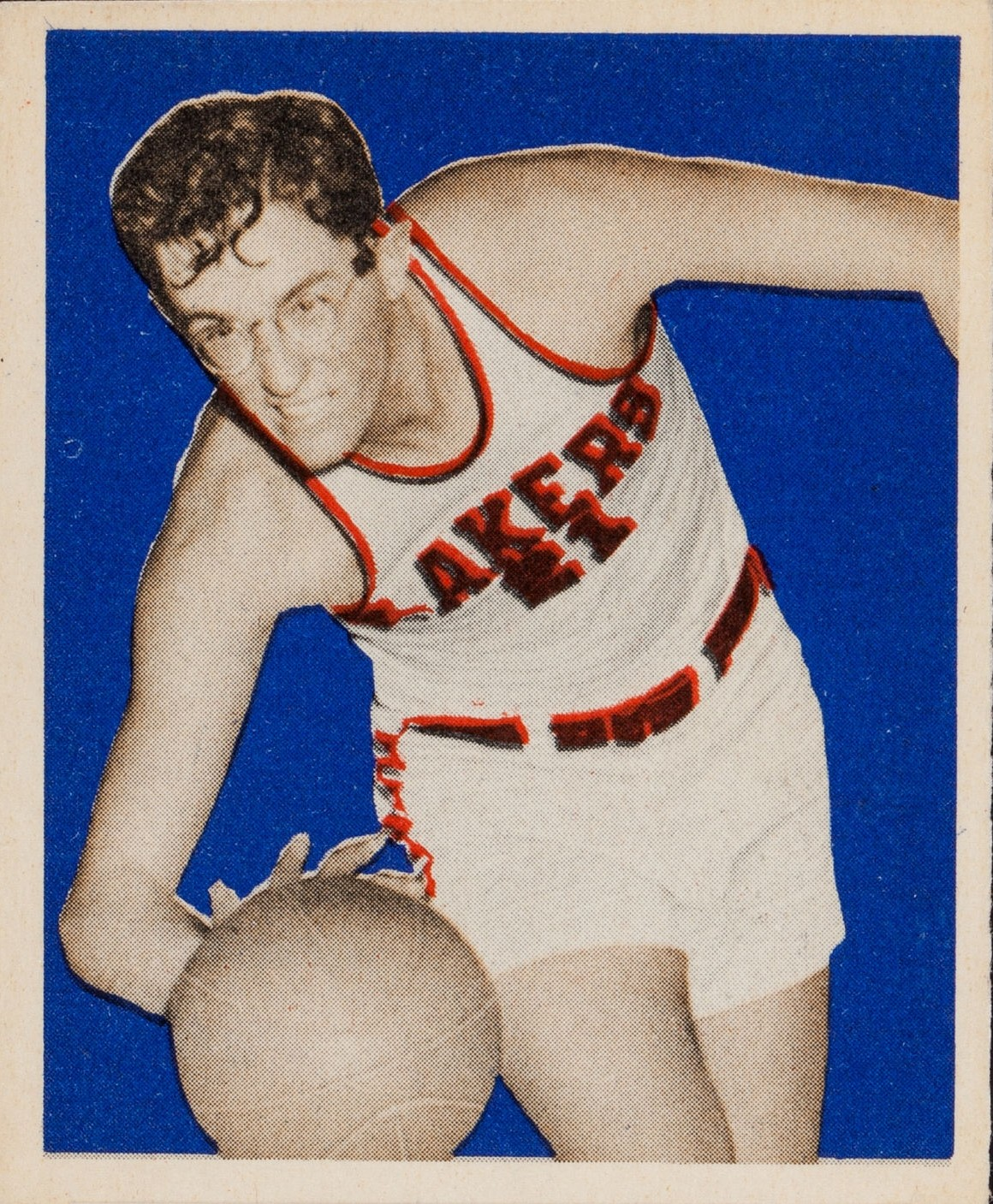
George Mikan, Minneapolis Lakers, 1948

Kundla briefly moved to the Lakers' front office ahead of the 1957–58 season. Coached by Mikan, the Lakers' record was 9–30, when Mikan stepped down and Kundla immediately returned to the bench, going 10–23 as the team finished 19–53, recording one of the worst seasons in its history while missing the NBA playoffs for the only time in Kundla's tenure.

Kundla then led the Lakers to a 33–39 record in his final season with an improved roster. Despite their losing record, Kundla led the 1958–1959 Lakers, with rookie Elgin Baylor, to series victories over the Detroit Pistons (2–1) and St. Louis Hawks (4–1) in the NBA Playoffs to reach the 1959 NBA Finals. The Lakers lost in the NBA Finals to Red Auerbach's Boston Celtics with Bill Russell and Bob Cousy in four games.

Overall, Kundla finished 423–302 (.583) in 11 seasons as coach of the Minneapolis Lakers, winning the BAA Championship in 1949 and NBA Championships in 1950, 1952, 1953 and 1954.

=== University of Minnesota (1959–1968) ===
In 1959, knowing that the Lakers franchise was going to be moved to Los Angeles (after being purchased by Bob Short, the team moved in 1960) and despite having future Hall of Famer Elgin Baylor on the team, Kundla chose to stay in Minnesota and resigned from the Lakers position to coach his alma mater, the University of Minnesota.

While coaching he also taught physical education at the university. He was the first Gophers coach to give scholarships to African-American players, resulting in him receiving hate mail. Kundla stayed with the Gophers for nine years before retiring from coaching after the 1967–68 season with a record of 110–105. His Gophers only finished as high as third in the Big Ten five times, and never reached the postseason.

After retiring from coaching, Kundla remained a physical education professor until retiring from the U of M in 1981.

== Honors ==
In 1996, Kundla was voted as one of the 10 greatest coaches in the history of the NBA.

In 11 years of coaching in the BAA/NBA, he had a record of 423–302 in the regular season and 60–35 in the playoffs. Kundla's 1947–48 NBL championship season team went 43–17 during the regular season with 14 more wins in the post-season, but does not count under official NBA records.

Kundla was inducted into the Naismith Memorial Basketball Hall of Fame in 1995, after being lamented as "all but forgotten" in a 1992 USA Today column.

Kundla was inducted into the College Basketball Hall of Fame in 2006.

After the Los Angeles Lakers won their 2002 championship, Kundla was awarded a championship ring along with other living Minneapolis Lakers players at a ceremony at the Staples Center.

== Personal life ==
Kundla met his wife, Marie, while they were undergraduates; the two raised six children.

After resigning from the Lakers, he stayed close with Mikan and Vern Mikkelsen, often meeting his former players for breakfast.

Kundla is the grandfather of former Michigan State Spartans men's basketball player, Isaiah Dahlman, and former Wofford Terriers men's basketball player, Noah Dahlman, who was named the Southern Conference Men's Basketball Player of the Year in 2009–10. His wife died in 2007; the following year he moved into the Main Street Lodge Assisted Living Home in Minneapolis and continued to watch and follow the NBA.

Kundla turned 100 in July 2016 and died on July 23, 2017, twenty days after his 101st birthday.

== Head coaching record ==
=== NBL ===
Legend
| Regular season | G | Games coached | W | Games won | L | Games lost | W–L % | Win–loss % |
| Playoffs | PG | Playoff games | PW | Playoff wins | PL | Playoff losses | PW–L % | Playoff win–loss % |

| Team | Year | G | W | L | W–L% | Finish | PG | PW | PL | PW–L% | Result |
|---|---|---|---|---|---|---|---|---|---|---|---|
| Minneapolis | 1947–48 | 60 | 43 | 17 | .717 | 1st in Western | 10 | 8 | 2 | .800 | Won NBL championship |

=== NBA ===
Legend
| Regular season | G | Games coached | W | Games won | L | Games lost | W–L % | Win–loss % |
| Playoffs | PG | Playoff games | PW | Playoff wins | PL | Playoff losses | PW–L % | Playoff win–loss % |

| Team | Year | G | W | L | W–L% | Finish | PG | PW | PL | PW–L% | Result |
|---|---|---|---|---|---|---|---|---|---|---|---|
| Minneapolis | 1948–49 | 60 | 44 | 16 | .733 | 2nd in Western | 10 | 8 | 2 | .800 | Won BAA Championship |
| Minneapolis | 1949–50 | 68 | 51 | 17 | .750 | 1st in Central | 12 | 10 | 2 | .833 | Won NBA Championship |
| Minneapolis | 1950–51 | 68 | 44 | 24 | .647 | 1st in Western | 7 | 3 | 4 | .429 | Lost in Div. Finals |
| Minneapolis | 1951–52 | 66 | 40 | 26 | .606 | 2nd in Western | 13 | 9 | 4 | .692 | Won NBA Championship |
| Minneapolis | 1952–53 | 70 | 48 | 22 | .686 | 1st in Western | 12 | 9 | 3 | .750 | Won NBA Championship |
| Minneapolis | 1953–54 | 72 | 46 | 26 | .639 | 1st in Western | 13 | 9 | 4 | .692 | Won NBA Championship |
| Minneapolis | 1954–55 | 72 | 40 | 32 | .556 | 2nd in Western | 7 | 3 | 4 | .429 | Lost in Div. Finals |
| Minneapolis | 1955–56 | 72 | 33 | 39 | .458 | 2nd in Western | 3 | 1 | 2 | .333 | Lost in Div. Semifinals |
| Minneapolis | 1956–57 | 72 | 34 | 38 | .472 | 2nd in Western | 5 | 2 | 3 | .400 | Lost in Div. Finals |
| Minneapolis | 1957–58 | 33 | 10 | 23 | .303 | 4th in Western | — | — | — | — | Missed Playoffs |
| Minneapolis | 1958–59 | 72 | 33 | 39 | .458 | 2nd in Western | 13 | 6 | 7 | .462 | Lost in NBA Finals |
| Career | | 725 | 423 | 302 | .583 | | 95 | 60 | 35 | .632 | Hall of Fame head coach |

=== College ===
Record table
| Season | Team | Overall | Conference | Standing | Postseason |
|---|---|---|---|---|---|
St. Thomas Tommies (Minnesota Intercollegiate Athletic Conference) (1946–1947)
| 1946–47 | St. Thomas | 11–11 | ?–? | ? | |
| St. Thomas: | | 11–11 (.500) | ?–? (–) | | |
Minnesota Golden Gophers (Big Ten Conference) (1959–1968)
| 1959–60 | Minnesota | 12–12 | 8–6 | T–3rd | |
| 1960–61 | Minnesota | 10–13 | 8–6 | T–4th | |
| 1961–62 | Minnesota | 10–14 | 6–8 | 7th | |
| 1962–63 | Minnesota | 12–12 | 8–6 | T–4th | |
| 1963–64 | Minnesota | 17–7 | 10–4 | 3rd | |
| 1964–65 | Minnesota | 19–5 | 11–3 | 2nd | |
| 1965–66 | Minnesota | 14–10 | 7–7 | T–5th | |
| 1966–67 | Minnesota | 9–15 | 5–9 | 9th | |
| 1967–68 | Minnesota | 7–17 | 4–10 | T–9th | |
| Minnesota: | | 110–105 (.512) | 67–59 (.532) | | |
| Total: | | 121–116 (.511) | | | |
