= List of NBA champions =

The NBA Finals is the annual championship series for the National Basketball Association (NBA) held at the conclusion of its postseason. All NBA Finals have been played in a best-of-seven format, and are contested between the winners of the Eastern Conference and the Western Conference (prior to 1971 it was played between division playoff winners), except in 1950 when the Eastern Division champion faced the winner between the Western and Central Division champions. From 1946 through 1949, when the league was known as the Basketball Association of America (BAA), the playoffs were a three-stage tournament where the two semifinal winners played each other in the finals. The winning team of the series receives the Larry O'Brien Championship Trophy, which has been awarded since 1977 (between 1947 and 1976 the winning team received the Walter A. Brown Trophy).

== Champions ==
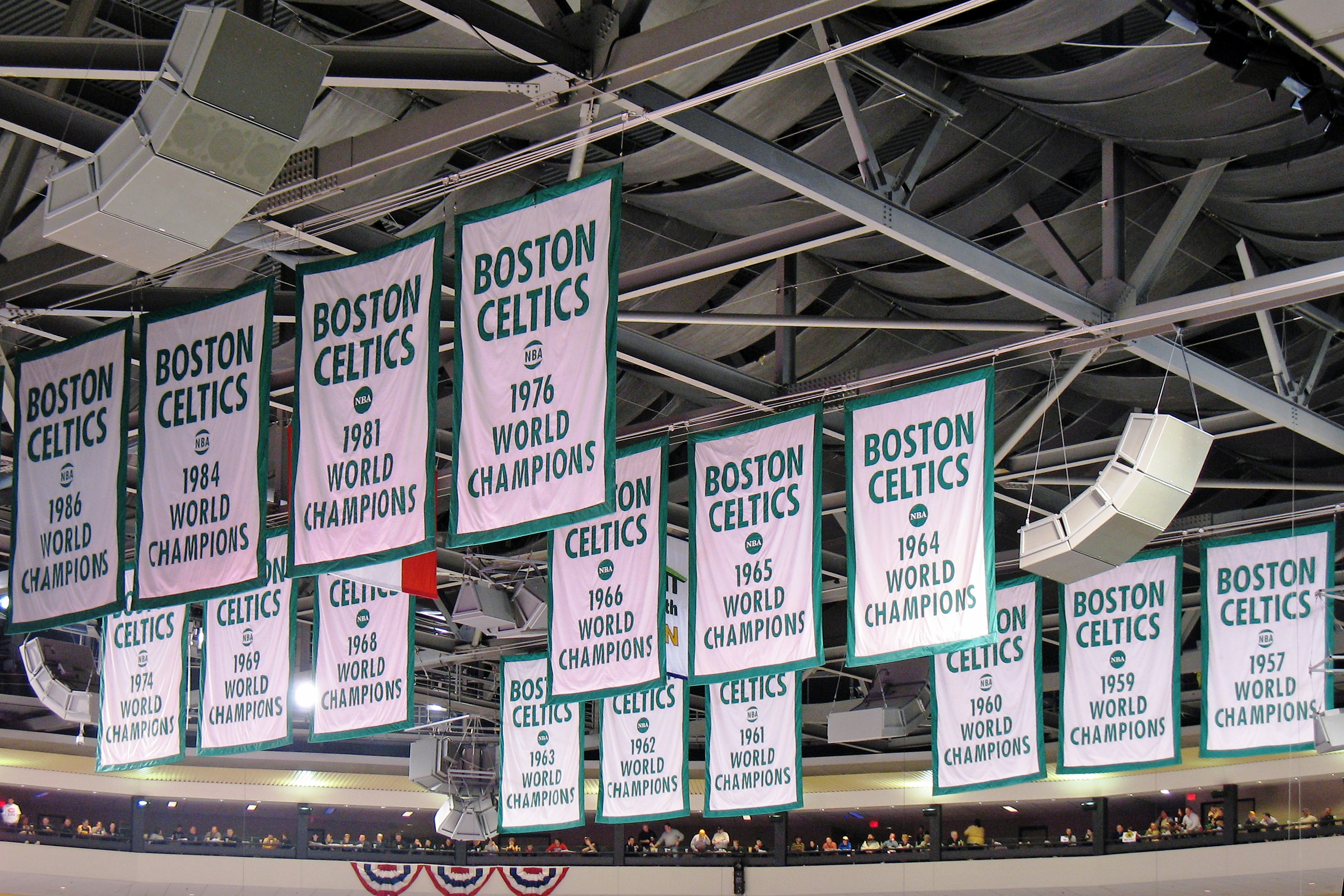
The Boston Celtics have won the most championships of any NBA team. Shown are the championship banners hanging in their home arena, TD Garden.

The most recent champions are the New York Knicks, who won their first championship since 1973. The Boston Celtics have won the most championships of any team in the league at 18. As of 2026, the Eastern champions have a 42–38 advantage in NBA titles over the Western champions. The 1949–50 Minneapolis Lakers, who won the NBA Finals, are counted in the Eastern versus Western champions record as they played that sole season in the Central Division before returning to the Western Division.

- The first parentheses in the Western champions and Eastern champions columns indicate the teams' playoff seed. The second parentheses indicate the number of times that teams have appeared in an NBA Finals as well as each respective team's NBA Finals record to date.

**Bold**	Winning team of the BAA/NBA Finals
Italics	Team with home-court advantage
Italics	Finals MVP was on losing team
†	Only defunct team to win championship

Year	Western champion	Coach	Result	Eastern champion	Coach	Finals MVP (Note: The Finals MVP Award was first awarded in 1969.)	Ref
1947	Chicago Stags (1) (1, 0–1)	Harold Olsen	1–4	**Philadelphia Warriors (2)** (1, 1–0)	Eddie Gottlieb	n/a	
1948	**Baltimore Bullets† (2)** (1, 1–0)	Buddy Jeannette	4–2	Philadelphia Warriors (1) (2, 1–1)	Eddie Gottlieb	n/a	
1949	**Minneapolis Lakers (2)** (1, 1–0)	John Kundla	4–2	Washington Capitols (1) (1, 0–1)	Red Auerbach	n/a	
1950	**Minneapolis Lakers (1)** (Note: Minneapolis was the Central Division (now defunct, no relation to the current Central Division) playoff champion, while the Anderson Packers were the Western Division playoff champion. Due to the NBA's realignment into three divisions, the team with the best regular season record after the divisional finals advanced automatically to the NBA Finals, while the other two teams faced off in the NBA semifinals to determine the other finalist. Eastern Division playoff champion Syracuse had the best regular season record among the division playoff champions, causing Minneapolis to face Anderson in the NBA semifinals.) (2, 2–0)	John Kundla	4–2	Syracuse Nationals (1) (1, 0–1)	Al Cervi	n/a	
1951	**Rochester Royals (2)** (1, 1–0)	Les Harrison	4–3	New York Knicks (3) (1, 0–1)	Joe Lapchick	n/a	
1952	**Minneapolis Lakers (2)** (3, 3–0)	John Kundla	4–3	New York Knicks (3) (2, 0–2)	Joe Lapchick	n/a	
1953	**Minneapolis Lakers (1)** (4, 4–0)	John Kundla	4–1	New York Knicks (1) (3, 0–3)	Joe Lapchick	n/a	
1954	**Minneapolis Lakers (1)** (5, 5–0)	John Kundla	4–3	Syracuse Nationals (1) (2, 0–2)	Al Cervi	n/a	
1955	Fort Wayne Pistons (1) (1, 0–1)	Charles Eckman	3–4	**Syracuse Nationals (1)** (3, 1–2)	Al Cervi	n/a	
1956	Fort Wayne Pistons (1) (2, 0–2)	Charles Eckman	1–4	**Philadelphia Warriors (1)** (3, 2–1)	George Senesky	n/a	
1957	St. Louis Hawks (1) (1, 0–1)	Alex Hannum	3–4	**Boston Celtics (1)** (1, 1–0)	Red Auerbach	n/a	
1958	**St. Louis Hawks (1)** (2, 1–1)	Alex Hannum	4–2	Boston Celtics (1) (2, 1–1)	Red Auerbach	n/a	
1959	Minneapolis Lakers (2) (6, 5–1)	John Kundla	0–4	**Boston Celtics (1)** (3, 2–1)	Red Auerbach	n/a	
1960	St. Louis Hawks (1) (3, 1–2)	Ed Macauley	3–4	**Boston Celtics (1)** (4, 3–1)	Red Auerbach	n/a	
1961	St. Louis Hawks (1) (4, 1–3)	Paul Seymour	1–4	**Boston Celtics (1)** (5, 4–1)	Red Auerbach	n/a	
1962	Los Angeles Lakers (1) (7, 5–2)	Fred Schaus	3–4	**Boston Celtics (1)** (6, 5–1)	Red Auerbach	n/a	
1963	Los Angeles Lakers (1) (8, 5–3)	Fred Schaus	2–4	**Boston Celtics (1)** (7, 6–1)	Red Auerbach	n/a	
1964 (Note: The trophy was renamed for Walter A. Brown.)	San Francisco Warriors (1) (4, 2–2)	Alex Hannum	1–4	**Boston Celtics (1)** (8, 7–1)	Red Auerbach	n/a	
1965	Los Angeles Lakers (1) (9, 5–4)	Fred Schaus	1–4	**Boston Celtics (1)** (9, 8–1)	Red Auerbach	n/a	
1966	Los Angeles Lakers (1) (10, 5–5)	Fred Schaus	3–4	**Boston Celtics (2)** (10, 9–1)	Red Auerbach	n/a	
1967	San Francisco Warriors (1) (5, 2–3)	Bill Sharman	2–4	**Philadelphia 76ers (1)** (4, 2–2)	Alex Hannum	n/a	
1968	Los Angeles Lakers (2) (11, 5–6)	Butch van Breda Kolff	2–4	**Boston Celtics (2)** (11, 10–1)	Bill Russell	n/a	
1969	Los Angeles Lakers (1) (12, 5–7)	Butch van Breda Kolff	3–4	**Boston Celtics (4)** (12, 11–1)	Bill Russell	Jerry West	
1970	Los Angeles Lakers (2) (13, 5–8)	Joe Mullaney	3–4	**New York Knicks (1)** (4, 1–3)	Red Holzman	Willis Reed	
1971	**Milwaukee Bucks (1)** (1, 1–0)	Larry Costello	4–0	Baltimore Bullets (1) (1, 0–1)	Gene Shue	Lew Alcindor	
1972	**Los Angeles Lakers (1)** (14, 6–8)	Bill Sharman	4–1	New York Knicks (2) (5, 1–4)	Red Holzman	Wilt Chamberlain	
1973	Los Angeles Lakers (2) (15, 6–9)	Bill Sharman	1–4	**New York Knicks (2)** (6, 2–4)	Red Holzman	Willis Reed	
1974	Milwaukee Bucks (1) (2, 1–1)	Larry Costello	3–4	**Boston Celtics (1)** (13, 12–1)	Tom Heinsohn	John Havlicek	
1975	**Golden State Warriors (1)** (6, 3–3)	Al Attles	4–0	Washington Bullets (2) (2, 0–2)	K.C. Jones	Rick Barry	
1976	Phoenix Suns (3) (1, 0–1)	John MacLeod	2–4	**Boston Celtics (1)** (14, 13–1)	Tom Heinsohn	Jo Jo White	
1977 (Note: The trophy was replaced by a new design.)	**Portland Trail Blazers (3)** (1, 1–0)	Jack Ramsay	4–2	Philadelphia 76ers (1) (5, 2–3)	Gene Shue	Bill Walton	
1978	Seattle SuperSonics (4) (1, 0–1)	Lenny Wilkens	3–4	**Washington Bullets (3)** (3, 1–2)	Dick Motta	Wes Unseld	
1979	**Seattle SuperSonics (1)** (2, 1–1)	Lenny Wilkens	4–1	Washington Bullets (1) (4, 1–3)	Dick Motta	Dennis Johnson	
1980	**Los Angeles Lakers (1)** (16, 7–9)	Paul Westhead	4–2	Philadelphia 76ers (3) (6, 2–4)	Billy Cunningham	Magic Johnson	
1981	Houston Rockets (6) (1, 0–1)	Del Harris	2–4	**Boston Celtics (1)** (15, 14–1)	Bill Fitch	Cedric Maxwell	
1982	**Los Angeles Lakers (1)** (17, 8–9)	Pat Riley	4–2	Philadelphia 76ers (3) (7, 2–5)	Billy Cunningham	Magic Johnson	
1983	Los Angeles Lakers (1) (18, 8–10)	Pat Riley	0–4	**Philadelphia 76ers (1)** (8, 3–5)	Billy Cunningham	Moses Malone	
1984 (Note: The trophy was renamed for Larry O'Brien.)	Los Angeles Lakers (1) (19, 8–11)	Pat Riley	3–4	**Boston Celtics (1)** (16, 15–1)	K.C. Jones	Larry Bird	
1985	**Los Angeles Lakers (1)** (20, 9–11)	Pat Riley	4–2	Boston Celtics (1) (17, 15–2)	K.C. Jones	Kareem Abdul-Jabbar	
1986	Houston Rockets (2) (2, 0–2)	Bill Fitch	2–4	**Boston Celtics (1)** (18, 16–2)	K.C. Jones	Larry Bird	
1987	**Los Angeles Lakers (1)** (21, 10–11)	Pat Riley	4–2	Boston Celtics (1) (19, 16–3)	K.C. Jones	Magic Johnson	
1988	**Los Angeles Lakers (1)** (22, 11–11)	Pat Riley	4–3	Detroit Pistons (2) (3, 0–3)	Chuck Daly	James Worthy	
1989	Los Angeles Lakers (1) (23, 11–12)	Pat Riley	0–4	**Detroit Pistons (1)** (4, 1–3)	Chuck Daly	Joe Dumars	
1990	Portland Trail Blazers (3) (2, 1–1)	Rick Adelman	1–4	**Detroit Pistons (1)** (5, 2–3)	Chuck Daly	Isiah Thomas	
1991	Los Angeles Lakers (3) (24, 11–13)	Mike Dunleavy	1–4	**Chicago Bulls (1)** (1, 1–0)	Phil Jackson	Michael Jordan	
1992	Portland Trail Blazers (1) (3, 1–2)	Rick Adelman	2–4	**Chicago Bulls (1)** (2, 2–0)	Phil Jackson	Michael Jordan	
1993	Phoenix Suns (1) (2, 0–2)	Paul Westphal	2–4	**Chicago Bulls (2)** (3, 3–0)	Phil Jackson	Michael Jordan	
1994	**Houston Rockets (2)** (3, 1–2)	Rudy Tomjanovich	4–3	New York Knicks (2) (7, 2–5)	Pat Riley	Hakeem Olajuwon	
1995	**Houston Rockets (6)** (4, 2–2)	Rudy Tomjanovich	4–0	Orlando Magic (1) (1, 0–1)	Brian Hill	Hakeem Olajuwon	
1996	Seattle SuperSonics (1) (3, 1–2)	George Karl	2–4	**Chicago Bulls (1)** (4, 4–0)	Phil Jackson	Michael Jordan	
1997	Utah Jazz (1) (1, 0–1)	Jerry Sloan	2–4	**Chicago Bulls (1)** (5, 5–0)	Phil Jackson	Michael Jordan	
1998	Utah Jazz (1) (2, 0–2)	Jerry Sloan	2–4	**Chicago Bulls (1)** (6, 6–0)	Phil Jackson	Michael Jordan	
1999 (Note: After a lockout, the season started on February 5, 1999, and all 29 teams played a shortened 50-game regular season schedule.)	**San Antonio Spurs (1)** (1, 1–0)	Gregg Popovich	4–1	New York Knicks (8) (8, 2–6)	Jeff Van Gundy	Tim Duncan	
2000	**Los Angeles Lakers (1)** (25, 12–13)	Phil Jackson	4–2	Indiana Pacers (1) (1, 0–1)	Larry Bird	Shaquille O'Neal	
2001	**Los Angeles Lakers (2)** (26, 13–13)	Phil Jackson	4–1	Philadelphia 76ers (1) (9, 3–6)	Larry Brown	Shaquille O'Neal	
2002	**Los Angeles Lakers (3)** (27, 14–13)	Phil Jackson	4–0	New Jersey Nets (1) (1, 0–1)	Byron Scott	Shaquille O'Neal	
2003	**San Antonio Spurs (1)** (2, 2–0)	Gregg Popovich	4–2	New Jersey Nets (2) (2, 0–2)	Byron Scott	Tim Duncan	
2004	Los Angeles Lakers (2) (28, 14–14)	Phil Jackson	1–4	**Detroit Pistons (3)** (6, 3–3)	Larry Brown	Chauncey Billups	
2005	**San Antonio Spurs (2)** (3, 3–0)	Gregg Popovich	4–3	Detroit Pistons (2) (7, 3–4)	Larry Brown	Tim Duncan	
2006	Dallas Mavericks (4) (1, 0–1)	Avery Johnson	2–4	**Miami Heat (2)** (1, 1–0)	Pat Riley	Dwyane Wade	
2007	**San Antonio Spurs (3)** (4, 4–0)	Gregg Popovich	4–0	Cleveland Cavaliers (2) (1, 0–1)	Mike Brown	Tony Parker	
2008	Los Angeles Lakers (1) (29, 14–15)	Phil Jackson	2–4	**Boston Celtics (1)** (20, 17–3)	Doc Rivers	Paul Pierce	
2009	**Los Angeles Lakers (1)** (30, 15–15)	Phil Jackson	4–1	Orlando Magic (3) (2, 0–2)	Stan Van Gundy	Kobe Bryant	
2010	**Los Angeles Lakers (1)** (31, 16–15)	Phil Jackson	4–3	Boston Celtics (4) (21, 17–4)	Doc Rivers	Kobe Bryant	
2011	**Dallas Mavericks (3)** (2, 1–1)	Rick Carlisle	4–2	Miami Heat (2) (2, 1–1)	Erik Spoelstra	Dirk Nowitzki	
2012 (Note: After a lockout, the season started on December 25, 2011, and all 30 teams played a shortened 66-game regular season schedule.)	Oklahoma City Thunder (2) (4, 1–3)	Scott Brooks	1–4	**Miami Heat (2)** (3, 2–1)	Erik Spoelstra	LeBron James	
2013	San Antonio Spurs (2) (5, 4–1)	Gregg Popovich	3–4	**Miami Heat (1)** (4, 3–1)	Erik Spoelstra	LeBron James	
2014	**San Antonio Spurs (1)** (6, 5–1)	Gregg Popovich	4–1	Miami Heat (2) (5, 3–2)	Erik Spoelstra	Kawhi Leonard	
2015	**Golden State Warriors (1)** (7, 4–3)	Steve Kerr	4–2	Cleveland Cavaliers (2) (2, 0–2)	David Blatt	Andre Iguodala	
2016	Golden State Warriors (1) (8, 4–4)	Steve Kerr	3–4	**Cleveland Cavaliers (1)** (3, 1–2)	Tyronn Lue	LeBron James	
2017	**Golden State Warriors (1)** (9, 5–4)	Steve Kerr	4–1	Cleveland Cavaliers (2) (4, 1–3)	Tyronn Lue	Kevin Durant	
2018	**Golden State Warriors (2)** (10, 6–4)	Steve Kerr	4–0	Cleveland Cavaliers (4) (5, 1–4)	Tyronn Lue	Kevin Durant	
2019	Golden State Warriors (1) (11, 6–5)	Steve Kerr	2–4	**Toronto Raptors (2)** (1, 1–0)	Nick Nurse	Kawhi Leonard	
2020 (Note: The conclusion of the 2019–20 NBA season was delayed due to the COVID-19 pandemic and finished in October 2020 during the bubble tournament.)	**Los Angeles Lakers (1)** (32, 17–15)	Frank Vogel	4–2	Miami Heat (5) (6, 3–3)	Erik Spoelstra	LeBron James	
2021	Phoenix Suns (2) (3, 0–3)	Monty Williams	2–4	**Milwaukee Bucks (3)** (3, 2–1)	Mike Budenholzer	Giannis Antetokounmpo	
2022	**Golden State Warriors (3)** (12, 7–5)	Steve Kerr	4–2	Boston Celtics (2) (22, 17–5)	Ime Udoka	Stephen Curry	
2023	**Denver Nuggets (1)** (1, 1–0)	Michael Malone	4–1	Miami Heat (8) (7, 3–4)	Erik Spoelstra	Nikola Jokić	
2024	Dallas Mavericks (5) (3, 1–2)	Jason Kidd	1–4	**Boston Celtics (1)** (23, 18–5)	Joe Mazzulla	Jaylen Brown	
2025	**Oklahoma City Thunder (1)** (5, 2–3)	Mark Daigneault	4–3	Indiana Pacers (4) (2, 0–2)	Rick Carlisle	Shai Gilgeous-Alexander	
2026	San Antonio Spurs (2) (7, 5–2)	Mitch Johnson	1–4	**New York Knicks (3)** (9, 3–6)	Mike Brown	Jalen Brunson	

== Records by franchise ==
Team	Wins	Losses	Apps	Pct	Year(s) won	Year(s) lost
Boston Celtics	18	5	23	.783	1957, 1959, 1960, 1961, 1962, 1963, 1964, 1965, 1966, 1968, 1969, 1974, 1976, 1981, 1984, 1986, 2008, 2024	1958, 1985, 1987, 2010, 2022
Los Angeles Lakers (Note: Includes record as Minneapolis Lakers)	17	15	32	.531	1949, 1950, 1952, 1953, 1954, 1972, 1980, 1982, 1985, 1987, 1988, 2000, 2001, 2002, 2009, 2010, 2020	1959, 1962, 1963, 1965, 1966, 1968, 1969, 1970, 1973, 1983, 1984, 1989, 1991, 2004, 2008
Golden State Warriors (Note: Includes record as Philadelphia and San Francisco Warriors)	7	5	12	.583	1947, 1956, 1975, 2015, 2017, 2018, 2022	1948, 1964, 1967, 2016, 2019
Chicago Bulls	6	0	6	1.000	1991, 1992, 1993, 1996, 1997, 1998	—
San Antonio Spurs	5	2	7	.714	1999, 2003, 2005, 2007, 2014	2013, 2026
Philadelphia 76ers (Note: Includes record as Syracuse Nationals)	3	6	9	.333	1955, 1967, 1983	1950, 1954, 1977, 1980, 1982, 2001
New York Knicks	3	6	9	.333	1970, 1973, 2026	1951, 1952, 1953, 1972, 1994, 1999
Detroit Pistons (Note: Includes record as Fort Wayne Pistons)	3	4	7	.429	1989, 1990, 2004	1955, 1956, 1988, 2005
Miami Heat	3	4	7	.429	2006, 2012, 2013	2011, 2014, 2020, 2023
Oklahoma City Thunder (Note: Includes record as Seattle SuperSonics)	2	3	5	.400	1979, 2025	1978, 1996, 2012
Houston Rockets	2	2	4	.500	1994, 1995	1981, 1986
Milwaukee Bucks	2	1	3	.667	1971, 2021	1974
Cleveland Cavaliers	1	4	5	.200	2016	2007, 2015, 2017, 2018
Atlanta Hawks (Note: Includes record as St. Louis Hawks)	1	3	4	.250	1958	1957, 1960, 1961
Washington Wizards (Note: Includes record as Baltimore and Washington Bullets)	1	3	4	.250	1978	1971, 1975, 1979
Portland Trail Blazers	1	2	3	.333	1977	1990, 1992
Dallas Mavericks	1	2	3	.333	2011	2006, 2024
Baltimore Bullets (original) (folded in 1954)	1	0	1	1.000	1948	—
Sacramento Kings (Note: Includes record as Rochester Royals)	1	0	1	1.000	1951	—
Toronto Raptors	1	0	1	1.000	2019	—
Denver Nuggets	1	0	1	1.000	2023	—
Phoenix Suns	0	3	3	.000	—	1976, 1993, 2021
Utah Jazz	0	2	2	.000	—	1997, 1998
Brooklyn Nets (Note: Includes record as New York and New Jersey Nets)	0	2	2	.000	—	2002, 2003
Orlando Magic	0	2	2	.000	—	1995, 2009
Indiana Pacers	0	2	2	.000	—	2000, 2025
Chicago Stags (folded in 1950)	0	1	1	.000	—	1947
Washington Capitols (folded in 1951)	0	1	1	.000	—	1949

== Consecutive championships ==
Eight consecutive

- Boston Celtics (1959–1966)

Three consecutive

- Minneapolis Lakers (1952–1954)
- Chicago Bulls (1991–1993)
- Chicago Bulls (1996–1998)
- Los Angeles Lakers (2000–2002)

Two consecutive

- Minneapolis Lakers (1949, 1950)
- Boston Celtics (1968, 1969)
- Los Angeles Lakers (1987, 1988)
- Detroit Pistons (1989, 1990)
- Houston Rockets (1994, 1995)
- Los Angeles Lakers (2009, 2010)
- Miami Heat (2012, 2013)
- Golden State Warriors (2017, 2018)

== Frequent matchups ==
Count	Matchup	Record	Years
12	Boston Celtics vs Minneapolis/Los Angeles Lakers	Celtics, 9–3	1959, 1962, 1963, 1965, 1966, 1968, 1969, 1984, 1985, 1987, 2008, 2010
6	Minneapolis/Los Angeles Lakers vs Syracuse Nationals/Philadelphia 76ers	Lakers, 5–1	1950, 1954, 1980, 1982, 1983, 2001
5	Minneapolis/Los Angeles Lakers vs New York Knicks	Lakers, 3–2	1952, 1953, 1970, 1972, 1973
4	Boston Celtics vs St. Louis Hawks (Atlanta Hawks)	Celtics, 3–1	1957, 1958, 1960, 1961
4	Golden State Warriors vs Cleveland Cavaliers	Warriors, 3–1	2015, 2016, 2017, 2018
3	Detroit Pistons vs Los Angeles Lakers	Pistons, 2–1	1988, 1989, 2004
2	Seattle SuperSonics (Oklahoma City Thunder) vs Washington Bullets (Washington Wizards)	Tied, 1–1	1978, 1979
2	Boston Celtics vs Houston Rockets	Celtics, 2–0	1981, 1986
2	Chicago Bulls vs Utah Jazz	Bulls, 2–0	1997, 1998
2	Dallas Mavericks vs Miami Heat	Tied, 1–1	2006, 2011
2	Miami Heat vs San Antonio Spurs	Tied, 1–1	2013, 2014
2	Boston Celtics vs San Francisco/Golden State Warriors	Tied, 1–1	1964, 2022
2	San Antonio Spurs vs New York Knicks	Tied, 1–1	1999, 2026

== See also ==
- NBA Finals Most Valuable Player
- List of NBA players with most championships
- List of NBA championship head coaches
- List of NBA franchise postseason droughts
- List of NBA franchise postseason streaks
- List of NBA longest winning streaks
- List of ABA champions
- List of National Basketball League (United States) champions
- List of NBA G League champions
- WNBA Finals
