= Leo Katkaveck =

American basketball and baseball player

Personal information
- Born: April 17, 1923 Manchester, Connecticut, U.S.
- Died: May 6, 2006 (aged 83) Greenville, North Carolina, U.S.
- Listed height: 6 ft 0 in (1.83 m)
- Listed weight: 185 lb (84 kg)

Career information
- High school: Manchester (Manchester, Connecticut)
- College: NC State (1941–1942, 1945–1948)
- BAA draft: 1948: — round, —
- Drafted by: Washington Capitols
- Playing career: 1948–1950
- Position: Guard
- Number: 23

Career history
- 1948–1950: Washington Capitols

Career BAA/NBA statistics
- Points: 457 (4.3 ppg)
- Assists: 136 (1.3 apg)
- Stats at NBA.com
- Stats at Basketball Reference

Leo Frank Katkaveck (April 17, 1923 – May 6, 2006) was an American professional basketball and baseball player. Katkaveck was selected in the 1948 BAA draft by the Washington Capitols after a collegiate career at North Carolina State. He played for the Capitols in 1948–49 and 1949–50 before retiring from basketball.

Katkaveck was also a minor league baseball player. Between 1948 and 1951, he played for the Warsaw Red Sox, Raleigh Capitals, Goldsboro Goldbugs, and Roanoke Rapids Jays.

== BAA/NBA career statistics ==
Legend
GP	Games played	FG%	Field-goal percentage
FT%	Free-throw percentage	APG	Assists per game
PPG	Points per game	**Bold**	Career high

=== Regular season ===
Year	Team	GP	FG%	FT%	APG	PPG
1948–49	Washington	53	**.332**	**.746**	**1.3**	4.2
1949–50	Washington	**54**	.306	.607	**1.3**	**4.4**
Career		107	.317	.685	1.3	4.3

=== Playoffs ===
Year	Team	GP	FG%	FT%	APG	PPG
1949	Washington	**9**	**.241**	**.750**	1.1	2.2
1950	Washington	2	.154	.667	**1.5**	**3.0**
Career		11	.214	.727	1.2	2.4
