= Bill Miller (basketball) =

American basketball player

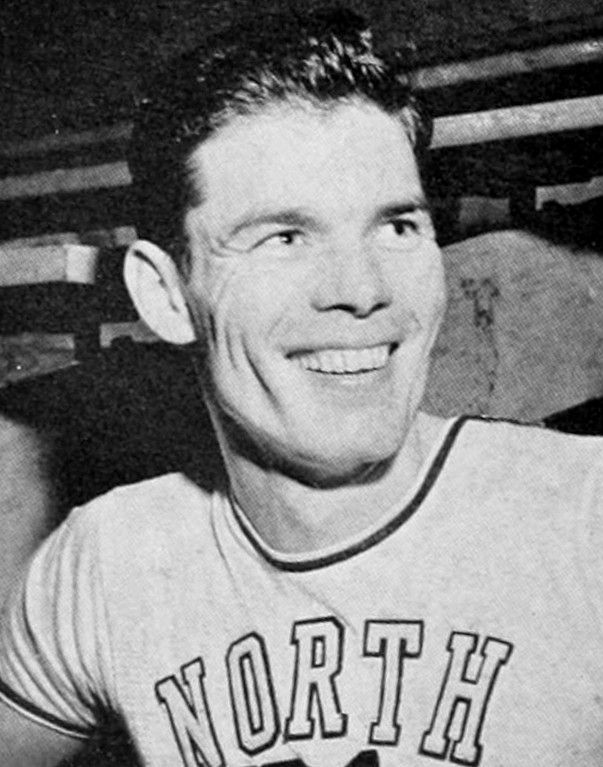
- Miller, circa 1948

Personal information
- Born: November 24, 1924 Berea, Kentucky, U.S.
- Died: July 9, 1991 (aged 66)
- Listed height: 6 ft 3 in (1.91 m)
- Listed weight: 190 lb (86 kg)

Career information
- High school: Williamsburg (Williamsburg, Kentucky)
- College: Eastern Kentucky (1944–1945); North Carolina (1947–1948)
- BAA draft: 1948: undrafted
- Playing career: 1948–1949
- Position: Forward
- Number: 6, 13, 21
- Coaching career: 1955–1979

Career history

Playing
- 1948: Chicago Stags
- 1948–1949: St. Louis Bombers

Coaching
- 1955–1956: Roanoke Rapids HS
- 1956–1959: Campbellsville
- 1959–1979: Elon
- Stats at NBA.com
- Stats at Basketball Reference

William Ralph Miller (November 24, 1924 – July 9, 1991) was an American professional basketball player. He played in the Basketball Association of America (BAA) for the Chicago Stags and St. Louis Bombers during the 1948–49 season. Prior to playing in the BAA, Miller played collegiate basketball at Eastern Kentucky Teachers College and then at the University of North Carolina Chapel Hill.

After the NBA, Miller became a college coach for Campbellsville Junior College and Elon University. Between 1968 and 1974, Miller led Elon to six straight 20-win seasons. In the Winter of 1973, Miller was selected to coach the NAIA All-Stars - which went on to defeat the NCAA All-Stars 107–78 in High Point, N.C. Miller ended his career with 329 wins at Elon, still the most in program history.

== BAA career statistics ==
Legend
GP	Games played	FG%	Field-goal percentage
FT%	Free-throw percentage	APG	Assists per game
PPG	Points per game	**Bold**	Career high

=== Regular season ===
Year	Team	GP	FG%	FT%	APG	PPG
1948–49	Chicago	**14**	.217	.444	.6	1.0
1948–49	St. Louis	**14**	**.327**	**.636**	**.9**	**2.8**
Career		28	.292	.550	.7	1.9

=== Playoffs ===
Year	Team	GP	FG%	FT%	APG	PPG
1949	St. Louis	1	.000	.000	.0	.0
Career		1	.000	.000	.0	.0
