= Fran Curran =

American basketball player

Personal information
- Born: September 9, 1922 Sterling, Illinois, U.S.
- Died: September 18, 2004 (aged 82) Benton, Pennsylvania, U.S.
- Listed height: 6 ft 0 in (1.83 m)
- Listed weight: 175 lb (79 kg)

Career information
- High school: Luzerne (Luzerne, Pennsylvania)
- College: Notre Dame (1941–1943, 1946–1947)
- BAA draft: 1947: undrafted
- Playing career: 1947–1950
- Position: Guard
- Number: 15

Career history
- 1947–1948: Toledo Jeeps
- 1948–1950: Rochester Royals
- Stats at NBA.com
- Stats at Basketball Reference

Francis Hugh Curran Sr. (September 9, 1922 – September 18, 2004) was an American professional basketball player. He spent one season in the Basketball Association of America (BAA) and one season in the BAA's later incarnation, the National Basketball Association (NBA). He played with the Rochester Royals during the 1948–49 and 1949–50 seasons. He played college basketball for the Notre Dame Fighting Irish.

== BAA/NBA career statistics ==
Legend
GP	Games played	FG%	Field-goal percentage
FT%	Free-throw percentage	APG	Assists per game
PPG	Points per game	**Bold**	Career high

=== Regular season ===
Year	Team	GP	FG%	FT%	APG	PPG
1948–49	Rochester	57	.363	.675	**1.4**	3.6
1949–50	Rochester	**66**	**.417**	**.826**	1.1	**6.0**
Career		123	.395	.774	1.2	4.9

=== Playoffs ===
Year	Team	GP	FG%	FT%	APG	PPG
1949	Rochester	**4**	.200	**1.000**	**.8**	1.0
1950	Rochester	2	**.286**	**1.000**	.0	**2.5**
Career		6	.250	1.000	.5	1.5
