= Kenny Rollins =

American basketball player

Personal information
- Born: September 14, 1923 Charleston, Missouri, U.S.
- Died: October 9, 2012 (aged 89) Greencastle, Indiana, U.S.
- Listed height: 6 ft 0 in (1.83 m)
- Listed weight: 168 lb (76 kg)

Career information
- High school: Wickliffe (Wickliffe, Kentucky)
- College: Kentucky (1942–1943, 1946–1948)
- NBA draft: 1948: 3rd round, 32nd overall pick
- Drafted by: Fort Wayne Pistons
- Playing career: 1948–1953
- Position: Point guard
- Number: 16, 4

Career history
- 1948–1950: Chicago Stags
- 1950–1951: Louisville Alumnites
- 1952–1953: Boston Celtics

Career highlights
- NCAA champion (1948)

Career BAA and NBA statistics
- Points: 817 (4.9 ppg)
- Rebounds: 45 (1.0 rpg)
- Assists: 344 (2.0 apg)
- Stats at NBA.com
- Stats at Basketball Reference
Medals
Men's basketball
Representing United States
Olympic Games
Gold medal – first place	1948 London	Team competition

Kenneth Herman Rollins (September 14, 1923 – October 9, 2012) was an American professional basketball player. He competed at the 1948 London Olympics and was a member of the University of Kentucky's "Fabulous Five" who won the 1948 NCAA tournament. His college career was interrupted by service in the United States Navy during World War II. He was voted to the All-SEC and All-SEC Tourney teams following his junior and senior seasons.

His brother, Phil, played for the University of Louisville and spent 3 seasons in the NBA.

== Biography ==
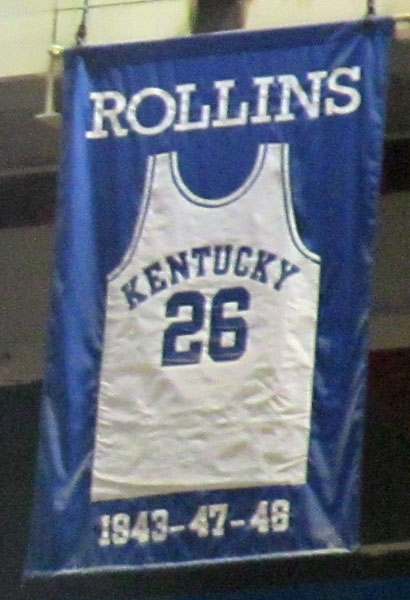
A jersey honoring Rollins hangs in Rupp Arena.

Born in Charleston, Missouri, Rollins played high school basketball in Wickliffe, Kentucky. He later played professionally for the Chicago Stags of the BAA and the NBA, the Louisville Alumnites of the National Professional Basketball League and the Boston Celtics of the NBA. He died in October 2012 in Greencastle, Indiana where he had lived with his son since 2004.

== BAA/NBA career statistics ==
Legend
GP	Games played	MPG	Minutes per game
FG%	Field-goal percentage	FT%	Free-throw percentage
RPG	Rebounds per game	APG	Assists per game
PPG	Points per game	**Bold**	Career high

=== Regular season ===
Year	Team	GP	MPG	FG%	FT%	RPG	APG	PPG
1948–49	Chicago	59	–	.277	.740	–	**2.8**	**6.2**
1949–50	Chicago	**66**	–	**.342**	.742	–	2.0	5.4
1952–53	Boston	43	**9.9**	.330	**.815**	**1.0**	1.1	2.3
Career		168	9.9	.309	.750	1.0	2.0	4.9

=== Playoffs ===
Year	Team	GP	MPG	FG%	FT%	RPG	APG	PPG
1949	Chicago	2	–	.000	.000	–	1.0	.0
1950	Chicago	2	–	.000	.000	–	.0	.0
1953	Boston	**6**	**10.8**	**.400**	**1.000**	**1.3**	**1.2**	**3.3**
Career		10	10.8	.250	1.000	1.3	.9	2.0
