= Andy Duncan (basketball) =

American basketball player

Personal information
- Born: April 17, 1922 Buford, Georgia, U.S.
- Died: April 12, 2006 (aged 83)
- Listed height: 6 ft 6 in (1.98 m)
- Listed weight: 195 lb (88 kg)

Career information
- College: William & Mary (1944–1947)
- BAA draft: 1947: – round, –
- Drafted by: New York Knicks
- Playing career: 1947–1951
- Position: Forward / center

Career history
- 1947–1950: Rochester Royals
- 1950–1951: Boston Celtics

Career BAA and NBA statistics
- Points: 746 (5.5 ppg)
- Rebounds: 30 (2.1 rpg)
- Assists: 101 (0.7 apg)
- Stats at NBA.com
- Stats at Basketball Reference

Andrew Myron Duncan (April 17, 1922 – April 12, 2006) was an American professional basketball player. Duncan played collegiately at William & Mary. He was drafted in the 1947 BAA draft by the New York Knicks. He played in the National Basketball League, Basketball Association of America and the National Basketball Association for the Rochester Royals and Boston Celtics from 1947 to 1951.

== BAA/NBA career statistics ==
Legend
GP	Games played	APG	Assists per game
FG%	Field-goal percentage	PPG	Points per game
FT%	Free-throw percentage	**Bold**	Career high

=== Regular season ===
Year	Team	GP	FG%	FT%	APG	PPG
1948–49	Rochester	55	.414	.615	**0.9**	**7.4**
1949–50	Rochester	**67**	**.433**	.556	0.6	4.6
1950–51	Boston	14	.175	**.682**	0.6	2.1
Career		136	.408	.596	0.7	5.5

=== Playoffs ===
Year	Team	GP	FG%	FT%	APG	PPG
1949	Rochester	**4**	.231	.000	**0.5**	1.5
1950	Rochester	2	**.667**	**1.000**	**0.5**	**3.0**
Career		6	.313	.667	0.5	2.0
