= 1948–49 Rochester Royals season =

BAA professional basketball team season

- Division champions
- Head coach: Les Harrison
- Owners: Jack Harrison; Les Harrison
- Arena: Edgerton Park Arena

Results
- Record: 45–15 (.750)
- Place: Division: 1st (Western)
- Playoff finish: West Division Finals (eliminated 0–2)
- Stats at Basketball Reference
- Radio: WHAM

The 1948–49 BAA season was the Royals' first season in the BAA (later known as the NBA).

== BAA Draft ==
Round	Pick	Player	Position	Nationality	College
1	10	Bobby Wanzer	G	United States	Seton Hall
–	–	Alex Athas	–	United States	Tulane
–	–	Bill Gabor	G/F	United States	Syracuse
–	–	Ed Keim	–	United States	Niagara
–	–	Leo Kubiak	G/F	United States	Bowling Green
–	–	Johnny Macknowski	F	United States	Seton Hall
–	–	Lionel Melamed	–	United States	CCNY
–	–	Hank O'Keefe	–	United States	Canisius
–	–	Warren Stickel	–	United States	Syracuse
–	–	Paul Yesavi	–	United States	Niagara

Originally, the Royals were one of four teams to participate in what was planned to be a joint draft procedure between the BAA and the rivaling National Basketball League. However, on the very day before the joint draft was set to commence, plans for it were scrapped when the Royals and three other NBL teams (including the defending NBL champion Minneapolis Lakers) decided to leave the NBL for the BAA, meaning they would participate in the 1948 BAA draft this time around instead or either a joint league draft akin to what the National Football League would later do with the future rivaling American Football League during the late 1960s or the 1948 NBL draft that they were originally meant to be a part of. Interestingly, the first round selection of Bobby Wanzer by the Royals could be considered a cheating selection for the franchise's first ever draft pick in the BAA/NBA since Wanzer had previously played for the Royals in the 1947–48 season back when they were a part of the rivaling National Basketball League. However, it was agreed between the Royals and the BAA that the Rochester franchise could either waive their territorial draft pick rights or their regular draft turn in order for them to retain Wanzer, with the Royals deciding to waive their territorial draft pick rights in order to retain Wanzer onto their team for good.

== Roster ==
1948–49 Rochester Royals roster
Players

Pos.	No.	Player	Height	Weight	DOB	From
SG	19	Bill Calhoun	6 ft 3 in (1.91 m)	180 lb (82 kg)	1927-11-04	CCSF
G	15	Fran Curran	6 ft 0 in (1.83 m)	175 lb (79 kg)	1925-09-19	Notre Dame
PG	11	Bob Davies	6 ft 1 in (1.85 m)	175 lb (79 kg)	1920-01-15	Seton Hall
F/C	10	Andy Duncan	6 ft 6 in (1.98 m)	195 lb (88 kg)	1922-04-17	William & Mary
F/C	10 – 12	Bob Fitzgerald	6 ft 5 in (1.96 m)	190 lb (86 kg)	1923-03-14	Seton Hall
PG	16	Red Holzman	5 ft 10 in (1.78 m)	175 lb (79 kg)	1920-08-10	CCNY
SF	17	Arnie Johnson	6 ft 5 in (1.96 m)	236 lb (107 kg)	1920-05-16	Bemidji State
G/F	13	Andrew Levane	6 ft 2 in (1.88 m)	190 lb (86 kg)	1920-04-11	St. John's
G	12	Lionel Malamed	5 ft 9 in (1.75 m)	150 lb (68 kg)	1924-11-15	CCNY
F/C	18	Mike Novak	6 ft 9 in (2.06 m)	219 lb (99 kg)	1915-04-23	Loyola Chicago
C	14	Arnie Risen	6 ft 9 in (2.06 m)	200 lb (91 kg)	1924-10-09	Ohio State
G	9	Bobby Wanzer	6 ft 0 in (1.83 m)	170 lb (77 kg)	1921-06-04	Seton Hall

Coaches
Head coach

Les Harrison

Legend
- (DP) Unsigned draft pick
- (FA) Free agent
- (S) Suspended
- Injured

Roster

== Regular season ==
=== Season standings ===
#	Western Division				
#	Team	W	L	PCT	GB
1	x-Rochester Royals	45	15	.750	–
2	x-Minneapolis Lakers	44	16	.733	1
3	x-Chicago Stags	38	22	.633	7
4	x-St. Louis Bombers	29	31	.483	16
5	Fort Wayne Pistons	22	38	.367	23
6	Indianapolis Jets	18	42	.300	27

=== Game log ===
1948–49 game log
Total: 45–15
November

Game	Date	Team	Score	High points	Location Attendance	Record
1	November 6	Indianapolis	W 69–58	Arnie Johnson (11)		1–0
2	November 10	@ Washington	L 66–73	Arnie Risen (17)		1–1
3	November 11	@ Philadelphia	W 83–75	Arnie Risen (21)		2–1
4	November 13	Boston	W 95–63	Red Holzman (16)		3–1
5	November 14	Minneapolis	W 92–75	Arnie Risen (19)		4–1
6	November 16	New York	W 75–63	Arnie Risen (13)		5–1
7	November 18	@ Providence	W 103–74	Red Holzman (18)		6–1
8	November 21	Washington	L 77–80	Davies, Risen (17)		6–2
9	November 23	Baltimore	W 108–90	Red Holzman (24)		7–2
10	November 27	Chicago	W 105–103 (2OT)	Arnie Risen (26)		8–2

December

Game	Date	Team	Score	High points	Location Attendance	Record
11	December 1	@ New York	W 73–72	Arnie Risen (28)		9–2
12	December 4	Philadelphia	W 105–101 (OT)	Arnie Risen (20)		10–2
13	December 6	@ Boston	W 87–79	Bob Davies (19)		11–2
14	December 7	Providence	L 89–90	Andy Duncan (20)		11–3
15	December 10	Minneapolis	L 75–96	Andy Duncan (15)		11–4
16	December 12	@ Minneapolis	L 58–67	Arnie Risen (12)		11–5
17	December 14	@ Chicago	W 85–78	Arnie Risen (26)		12–5
18	December 18	Fort Wayne	W 84–64	Bobby Wanzer (21)		13–5
19	December 19	@ Fort Wayne	W 83–78 (OT)	Red Holzman (17)		14–5
20	December 21	@ Indianapolis	W 84–71	Arnie Risen (25)		15–5
21	December 25	St. Louis	W 90–82	Arnie Risen (19)		16–5
22	December 26	@ Minneapolis	L 90–99	Andy Duncan (22)		16–6
23	December 29	@ New York	L 74–77	Arnie Risen (16)		16–7
24	December 30	@ Baltimore	L 89–100	Bobby Wanzer (22)		16–8

January

Game	Date	Team	Score	High points	Location Attendance	Record
25	January 1	St. Louis	W 106–83	Bobby Wanzer (18)		17–8
26	January 2	@ St. Louis	W 89–64	Novak, Risen (14)		18–8
27	January 6	@ Indianapolis	L 62–73	Arnie Risen (11)		18–9
28	January 8	Chicago	L 88–91	Arnie Risen (25)		18–10
29	January 9	@ Chicago	W 90–75	Bob Davies (26)		19–10
30	January 11	Philadelphia	W 83–71	Arnie Risen (21)		20–10
31	January 13	@ Baltimore	W 102–85	Bobby Wanzer (18)		21–10
32	January 15	Fort Wayne	W 73–62	Davies, Wanzer (14)		22–10
33	January 19	vs Indianapolis	W 70–66	Bob Davies (33)		23–10
34	January 20	@ St. Louis	W 84–74	Bob Davies (26)		24–10
35	January 22	New York	W 103–98 (2OT)	Bob Davies (22)		25–10
36	January 23	@ Fort Wayne	W 81–80 (OT)	Bob Davies (29)		26–10
37	January 29	Baltimore	W 90–86	Arnie Risen (22)		27–10

February

Game	Date	Team	Score	High points	Location Attendance	Record
38	February 1	@ Boston	W 76–68	Bobby Wanzer (21)		28–10
39	February 3	@ Providence	L 80–88	Arnie Risen (26)		28–11
40	February 5	Fort Wayne	W 80–61	Red Holzman (15)		29–11
41	February 6	@ Minneapolis	W 85–74	Arnie Risen (22)		30–11
42	February 8	Providence	W 97–65	Arnie Risen (20)		31–11
43	February 9	@ Washington	L 94–99 (2OT)	Bob Davies (29)		31–12
44	February 10	@ Baltimore	W 90–76	Arnie Risen (27)		32–12
45	February 12	Chicago	W 87–73	Davies, Risen (23)		33–12
46	February 15	Washington	W 91–79	Arnie Risen (17)		34–12
47	February 17	@ St. Louis	W 68–63	Bob Davies (19)		35–12
48	February 18	@ Indianapolis	W 65–53	Bob Davies (14)		36–12
49	February 19	Indianapolis	W 87–73	Arnie Risen (25)		37–12
50	February 22	Philadelphia	W 92–86	Arnie Risen (17)		38–12
51	February 26	Boston	W 64–59	Arnie Johnson (17)		39–12

March

Game	Date	Team	Score	High points	Location Attendance	Record
52	March 1	Washington	W 67–64	Arnie Johnson (14)		40–12
53	March 5	Providence	W 81–64	Bobby Wanzer (14)		41–12
54	March 6	@ Fort Wayne	W 78–66	Arnie Risen (29)		42–12
55	March 10	@ Philadelphia	W 73–71	Bob Davies (25)		43–12
56	March 12	St. Louis	W 104–74	Arnie Risen (21)		44–12
57	March 15	@ Boston Celtics	L 83–86	Arnie Risen (28)		44–13
58	March 16	@ New York	W 94–89	Bob Davies (29)		45–13
59	March 19	Minneapolis	L 85–99	Red Holzman (15)		45–14
60	March 20	@ Chicago	L 61–98	Fran Curran (15)		45–15

== BAA Playoffs ==
1949 playoff game log
Division Semifinals: 2–0 (home: 1–0; road: 1–0)

Game	Date	Team	Score	High points	Location	Series
1	March 22	St. Louis	W 93–64	Bob Davies (23)	Edgerton Park Arena	1–0
2	March 23	@ St. Louis	W 66–64	Bobby Wanzer (17)	St. Louis Arena	2–0

Division Finals: 0–2 (home: 0–1; road: 0–1)

Game	Date	Team	Score	High points	Location	Series
1	March 27	Minneapolis	L 79–80	Arnie Risen (17)	Edgerton Park Arena	0–1
2	March 29	@ Minneapolis	L 55–67	Arnie Risen (21)	St. Paul Auditorium	0–2

1949 schedule

== Awards and records ==
- Bob Davies, All-NBA First Team
