= Dick Wehr =

American basketball player and coach

Personal information
- Born: December 9, 1925 Caldwell, Ohio, U.S.
- Died: December 1, 2011 (aged 85) Atlanta, Georgia, U.S.
- Listed height: 6 ft 4 in (1.93 m)
- Listed weight: 180 lb (82 kg)

Career information
- High school: Barnesville (Barnesville, Ohio)
- College: Indiana; Rice (1944–1945)
- BAA draft: 1948: – round, –
- Drafted by: Indianapolis Jets
- Playing career: 1948–1949
- Position: Forward
- Number: 60

Career history

Playing
- 1948: Indianapolis Jets

Coaching
- 1964–1967: Georgia State

Career highlights
- First-team All-SWC (1945)

Career BAA statistics
- Points: 12 (1.3 ppg)
- Assists: 3 (0.3 apg)
- Stats at NBA.com
- Stats at Basketball Reference

Richard Wade Wehr (December 9, 1925 – December 1, 2011) was an American professional basketball player and college coach.

Wehr played college basketball for the Rice Owls and was a first-team All-Southwest Conference selection in 1945. Wehr was selected in the 1948 BAA draft by the Indianapolis Jets. He played for the Jets in nine games, recording 12 points and 3 assists.

Wehr coached Georgia State University's men's basketball and golf teams following his playing career.

== BAA career statistics ==
Legend
GP	Games played
FG%	Field-goal percentage
FT%	Free-throw percentage
APG	Assists per game
PPG	Points per game

=== Regular season ===
Year	Team	GP	FG%	FT%	APG	PPG
1948–49	Indianapolis	9	.238	.333	.3	1.3
Career		9	.238	.333	.3	1.3

== Head coaching record ==
Record table
Season	Team	Overall	Conference	Standing	Postseason
Georgia State Panthers (Independent) (1964–1967)
1964–65	Georgia State	2–19			
1965–66	Georgia State	2–18			
1966–67	Georgia State	4–20			
Georgia State:		8–57			
Total:		8–57			
