= Ralph Hamilton =

American basketball player

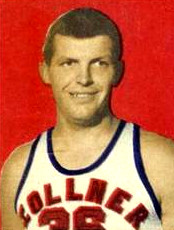
- Hamilton in 1948

Personal information
- Born: June 10, 1921 Fort Wayne, Indiana, U.S.
- Died: June 5, 1983 (aged 61)
- Listed height: 6 ft 1 in (1.85 m)
- Listed weight: 188 lb (85 kg)

Career information
- High school: South Side (Fort Wayne, Indiana)
- College: Indiana (1941–1943, 1946–1947)
- BAA draft: 1947: undrafted
- Playing career: 1947–1951
- Position: Guard / forward
- Number: 36, 55

Career history
- 1947–1948: Fort Wayne (Zollner) Pistons
- 1948–1949: Indianapolis Jets
- 1950–1951: Kansas City Hi-Spots

Career highlights
- Consensus first-team All-American (1947); First-team All-Big Ten (1947)

Career statistics
- Points: 289
- Rebounds: Not tracked
- Assists: 83
- Stats at NBA.com
- Stats at Basketball Reference

Ralph Albert Hamilton (June 10, 1921 – June 5, 1983) was an American professional basketball player. He played for the Fort Wayne Pistons and Indianapolis Jets of the National Basketball League and the Basketball Association of America (BAA), precursors to the modern day National Basketball Association (NBA). Hamilton was traded by the Pistons to the Jets in December 1948.

Hamilton, a native of Fort Wayne, Indiana, played collegiately at Indiana University in Bloomington. He played for the Hoosiers in 1941–42 and 1942–43 (his sophomore and junior years, respectively) but then served in the United States Army for three years during the end of World War II. When he came back as a 25-year-old senior in 1946–47, he served as team captain and led them in scoring, was named First Team All-Big Ten Conference and was dubbed a consensus First Team All-American. He also scored nearly 1,000 points during his staggered college career.

Hamilton died in 1983 just shy of his 62nd birthday.

== BAA career statistics ==
Legend
| GP | Games played | FG% | Field-goal percentage |
| FT% | Free-throw percentage | APG | Assists per game |
| PPG | Points per game | **Bold** | Career high |

=== Regular season ===
| Year | Team | GP | FG% | FT% | APG | PPG |
|---|---|---|---|---|---|---|
| 1948–49 | Fort Wayne | 10 | .242 | **.769** | .3 | 4.2 |
| 1948–49 | Indianapolis | **38** | **.257** | .654 | **2.1** | **6.5** |
| Career | | 48 | .255 | .670 | 1.7 | 6.0 |
