= Walt Kirk =

American basketball player and coach (1924–2012)

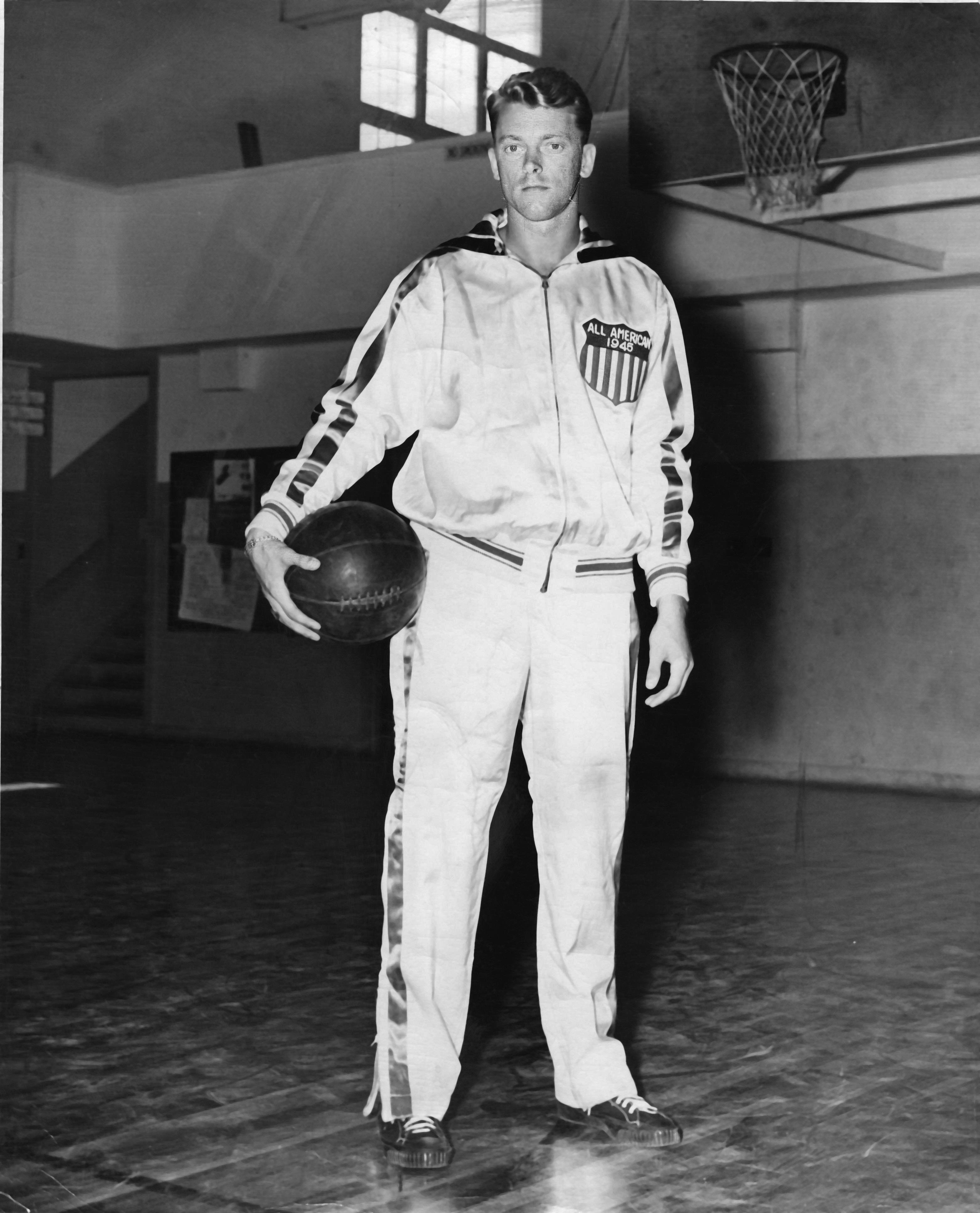
- Kirk from The Illio, 1945

Personal information
- Born: September 3, 1924 Mount Vernon, Illinois, US
- Died: December 12, 2012 (aged 88) Dubuque, Iowa, US
- Listed height: 6 ft 3 in (1.91 m)
- Listed weight: 173 lb (78 kg)

Career information
- High school: Mount Vernon (Mount Vernon, Illinois)
- College: Illinois (1943–1947)
- BAA draft: 1947: undrafted
- Playing career: 1947–1952
- Position: Point guard
- Number: 35, 60, 9, 4, 16

Career history
- 1947–1948: Fort Wayne Pistons
- 1948–1949: Indianapolis Jets
- 1949: Anderson Packers
- 1949–1950: Tri-Cities Blackhawks
- 1950–1951: Kansas City Hi-Spots
- 1952: Milwaukee Hawks

Career highlights
- Consensus first-team All-American (1945)

Career NBA statistics
- Points: 907
- Rebounds: 44
- Assists: 249
- Stats at NBA.com
- Stats at Basketball Reference

Walton Kirk Jr. (September 3, 1924 – December 12, 2012) was an American professional basketball player.

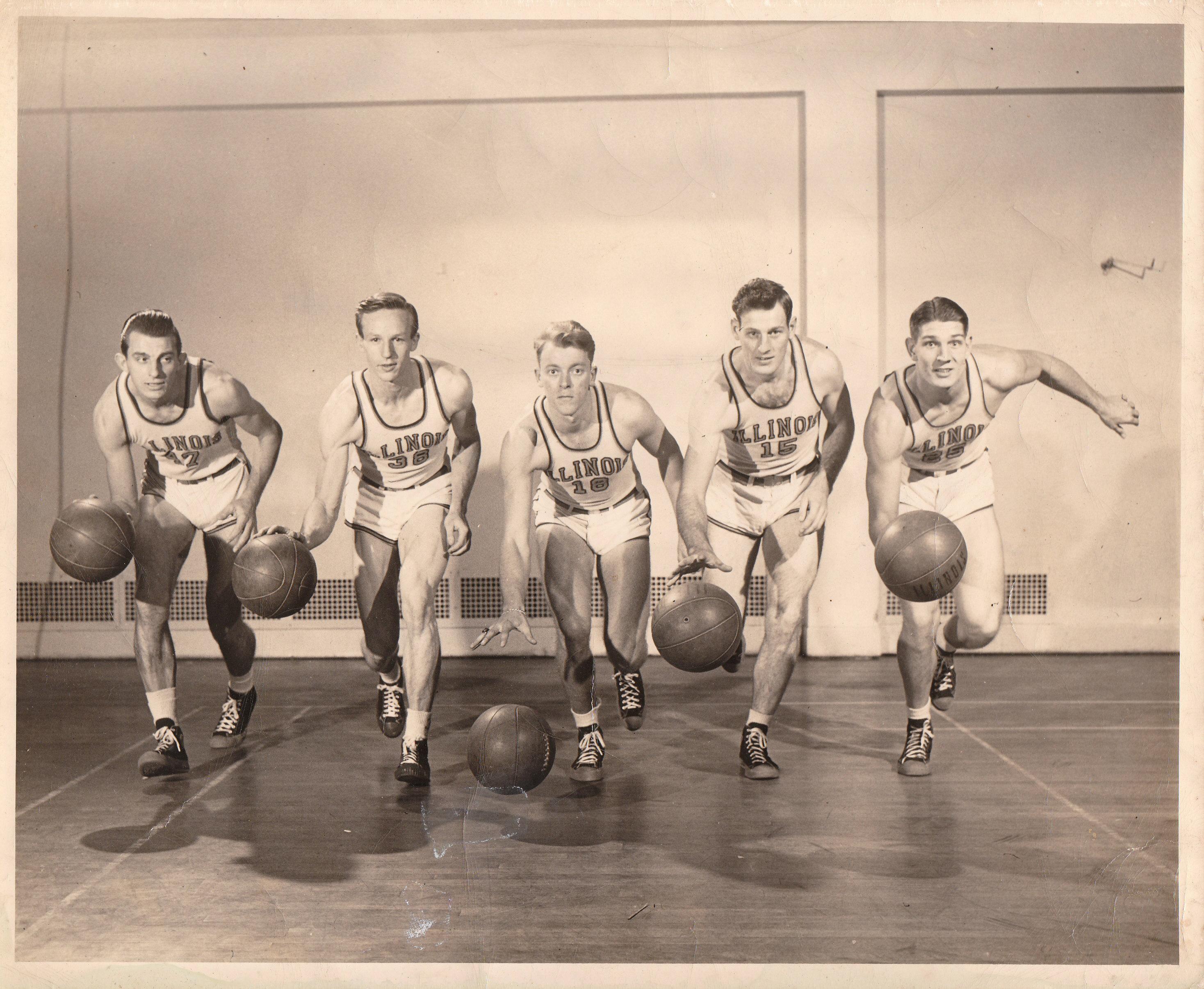
1946–47 Illini Starting Five(L to R) Andy Phillip, Ken Menke, Walt Kirk, Jack Smiley, Gene Vance

Walton Kirk Jr, the son of Walton Sr. and Gertrude Kirk, grew up in Mount Vernon, Illinois and graduated from Mt. Vernon Township High School in 1942, known in his home town and in southern Illinois as 'Junior' Kirk. While in high school, Kirk played basketball and was a first team all-state selection in 1942. He then attended the University of Illinois atUrbana–Champaign where he played basketball. He received his Bachelor Degree from the University of Illinois in 1947 and his master's degree from Loras College in 1972. He married Alyce "Joan" (Hitter) of Ottawa, Illinois on September 11, 1949. While at Illinois, he earned varsity letters in basketball from 1943–44 through 1946–47. During his freshman and sophomore years of 1942–44, Kirk practiced and played alongside of the famous 'Whiz Kids' of Illinois, who won the Big 10 in consecutive seasons, 1941–42 & 1942–43. In the 1944–45 season, Kirk led the team in scoring at 10.6 points per game while also serving as team captain. He garnered First Team All Big 10 status and consensus First Team All-American status at the end of the 1944–45 season as selected by Chuck Taylor's Converse Yearbook, Helms Athletic Foundation, Argosy Magazine and The Sporting News. Kirk was named captain of the 1945–46 Illini team, however, he was called to military service and missed the season. Many great college and pro players were called to military service during the war years (1941–46), disrupting NCAA basketball, however, many played on military service teams as well as carrying out their military service duties. Upon his return from military service and during his senior season at Illinois (1946–47), Kirk played alongside 4 returning members of the 'Whiz Kids' (Phillip, Menke, Smiley and Vance) and included on that team was Dike Eddleman, considered by many to be the greatest all-around athlete in America at that time.

Kirk would go on to play professionally after his senior year at Illinois (1946–47). A unique event occurred after his senior college season ended, 5 members of that Illini team that included the 4 Whiz Kids and Kirk (the 6th Whiz Kid), signed professional contracts. Kirk, Jack Smiley and Ken Menke signed with the Ft. Wayne Zollner Pistons of the NBL (National Basketball League), who were world champions throughout most of the 1940s, and Andy Phillip, a future Naismith Hall of Fame player, and Gene Vance signed with the Chicago Stags. Kirk's contract of $10,000 per year was the highest contract for a guard in professional basketball at the time. For perspective, the highest paid player in the NBL and the BAA was the iconic, original big man, George Mikan who was paid only $30,000 per year in the pre-NBA days of professional basketball. The NBL (National Basketball League) and the BAA (Basketball Association of America) professional basketball leagues merged to become the NBA (National Basketball Association) in 1949.

In five NBL/BAA/NPBL/NBA seasons, Kirk played for six different teams: the Fort Wayne Pistons, Indianapolis Jets, Anderson Packers, Tri-Cities Blackhawks, Kansas City Hi-Spots (NPBL) and the Milwaukee Hawks. In April 1949, while a member of the Jets, Kirk's former teammates George Glamack and Leo Mogus sued the organization for $4,662.51 each after the three of them were released. Kirk did not take part in the lawsuit, Ben Kerner was the owner of the Tri-Cities Blackhawks, coached by Red Auerbach, where Kirk ended up after a pass through the Anderson Packers (IN), Kerner and the league guaranteed that he would be paid the backpay that was owed. Glamack and Mogus cited poor management and administration on the part of the Jets as the reasons why they were unable to be retained.

Walt Kirk later coached at Harvard high school (IL), Salem high school (IL), Dubuque Senior high school (IA), Kirk replaced former Illini teammate, Coach Johnny Orr, at Dubuque Senior high school, when Orr left (1959) to begin his college coaching career at Wisconsin, UMass, Michigan and Iowa State, Kirk also coached at Dubuque Hempstead high school and was an Associate Principal.

Walton Kirk Jr. died on December 12, 2012, from complications due to Parkinson's Disease.

== Honors ==
- First-team all-state (Mount Vernon) – 1942
- 3× First-team All-Big Ten – (1944, 1945, 1947)
- University of Illinois Athlete of the Year – 1945
- Consensus first-team All-American – 1945
- Illinois Basketball Coaches Association Hall of Fame (as a player) – 1974
- Honored jersey which hangs in the State Farm Center to show regard for being the most decorated basketball players in the University of Illinois' history. – 2008

== Statistics ==
=== College ===
Season	Games	Points	PPG	Big Ten record	Overall record	Highlight
1943–44	20	223	11.1	5–7	11–9	All-Big Ten
1944–45	20	212	10.6	7–5	13–7	All-Big Ten and Consensus 1st team All-American
1946–47	19	84	4.4	8–4	14–6	All-Big Ten
Totals	59	519	8.8	20–16	38–22	

== BAA/NBA career statistics ==
Legend
GP	Games played	MPG	Minutes per game
FG%	Field-goal percentage	FT%	Free-throw percentage
RPG	Rebounds per game	APG	Assists per game
PPG	Points per game	**Bold**	Career high

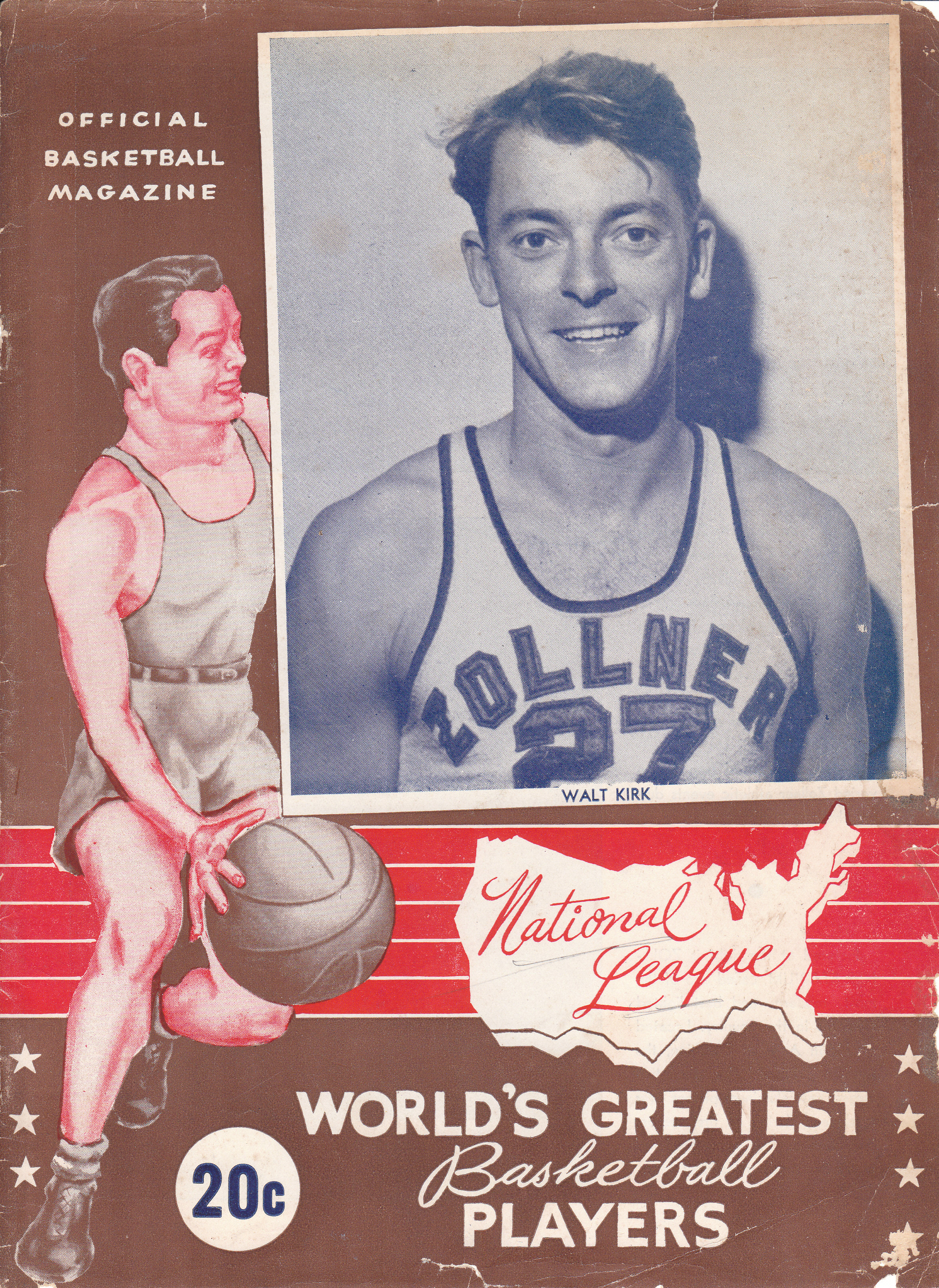
Fort Wayne Zollner Pistons – Walt Kirk

=== Regular season ===
Year	Team	GP	MPG	FG%	FT%	RPG	APG	PPG
1947–48	Fort Wayne	14	–	**.361**	**.758**	–	.9	4.9
1948–49	Indianapolis	**35**	–	.342	.717	–	**3.0**	**10.8**
1949–50	Anderson	26	–	.248	.687	–	1.7	4.6
1949–50	Tri-Cities	32	–	.280	.737	–	1.9	7.2
1951–52	Milwaukee	11	**36.0**	.277	.705	**4.0**	2.5	10.1
Career		118	36.0	.305	.718	4.0	2.1	7.7

=== Playoffs ===
Year	Team	GP	MPG	FG%	FT%	RPG	APG	PPG
1950	Tri-Cities	3	–	.286	.167	–	.3	1.7
Career		3	–	.286	.167	–	.3	1.7
