= Ray Lumpp =

American basketball player

Personal information
- Born: July 11, 1923 Brooklyn, New York, U.S.
- Died: January 16, 2015 (aged 91) Mineola, New York, U.S.
- Listed height: 6 ft 1 in (1.85 m)
- Listed weight: 178 lb (81 kg)

Career information
- High school: Newtown (Queens, New York)
- College: NYU (1942–1943, 1946–1948)
- NBA draft: 1948: 2nd round, 14th overall pick
- Drafted by: Indianapolis Jets
- Playing career: 1948–1953
- Position: Point guard / shooting guard
- Number: 40, 7, 8

Career history
- 1948–1949: Indianapolis Jets
- 1949–1952: New York Knicks
- 1952–1953: Baltimore Bullets

Career BAA and NBA statistics
- Points: 2,462 (8.2 ppg)
- Rebounds: 391 (2.2 rpg)
- Assists: 654 (2.2 apg)
- Stats at NBA.com
- Stats at Basketball Reference
Medals
Men's basketball
Representing the United States
Olympic Games
Gold medal – first place	1948 London	Team competition

Raymond George Lumpp (July 11, 1923 – January 16, 2015) was an American professional basketball player.

Lumpp was born in Brooklyn and grew up in Queens. He played college basketball for New York University, and was on the team that made it to the finals of the 1948 NIT tournament. Lumpp competed in the 1948 Summer Olympics as part of the American men's basketball team that won the gold medal. From 1948 to 1953 Lumpp played professionally for the NBA's New York Knicks, Indianapolis Jets, and Baltimore Bullets. He averaged 12.7 points per game in his rookie season.

Following his basketball career, Lumpp served as athletic director of the New York Athletic Club and ran the club's annual track and field meet during the 1960s. He later organized the Vitalis Olympic Invitational indoor meet held at the Meadowlands. He died in Mineola, New York in January 2015.

== BAA/NBA career statistics ==
Legend
GP	Games played	MPG	Minutes per game
FG%	Field-goal percentage	FT%	Free-throw percentage
RPG	Rebounds per game	APG	Assists per game
PPG	Points per game	**Bold**	Career high

=== Regular season ===
Year	Team	GP	MPG	FG%	FT%	RPG	APG	PPG
1948–49	Indianapolis	37	–	.331	.754	–	**3.4**	12.2
1948–49	New York	24	–	.376	.804	–	1.4	**13.5**
1949–50	New York	58	–	.322	.796	–	1.6	4.6
1950–51	New York	**64**	–	**.404**	.775	2.0	1.8	6.7
1951–52	New York	62	21.2	.387	.756	2.0	2.0	7.4
1952–53	New York	6	16.5	.267	**1.000**	**3.7**	2.5	4.7
1952–53	Baltimore	49	**27.0**	.378	.727	2.4	3.1	10.2
Career		300	23.4	.366	.767	2.2	2.2	8.2

=== Playoffs ===
Year	Team	GP	MPG	FG%	FT%	RPG	APG	PPG
1949	New York	6	–	.288	.771	–	1.8	**11.5**
1950	New York	5	–	**.556**	.667	–	.6	4.4
1951	New York	**13**	–	.358	.870	1.5	1.8	5.2
1952	New York	12	16.2	.245	**.920**	1.6	1.3	4.1
1953	Baltimore	2	37.5	.212	.700	**4.0**	**2.5**	10.5
Career		38	19.2	.307	.823	1.7	1.5	6.0
