= 1948–49 Indianapolis Jets season =

- Head coach: Bruce Hale (4–13); Burl Friddle (14–29)
- General manager: William Hale
- Owner: Paul A. Walk
- Arena: Hinkle Fieldhouse

Results
- Record: 18–42 (.300)
- Place: Division: 6th (Western)
- Playoff finish: Did not qualify
- Stats at Basketball Reference
- Radio: WXLW

The 1948–49 BAA season was the Jets' 1st and only season as the Jets in the NBA/BAA, as well as their eighth professional season including their time spent in the NBL (eleventh if you include their seasons in the short-lived NPBL and MBC leagues) and 14th (17th if you include brief cameos in the World Professional Basketball Tournament as the Indianapolis Pure Oils and Indianapolis Oilers) and final season as a franchise after previously going by the Indianapolis Kautskys, named under original team owner Frank Kautsky's local grocery store. After the season ended and they participated in the 1949 BAA draft, the NBL would merge with the BAA to form the NBA. However, before the merger officially happened, the Jets' owner, Paul A. Walk, wanted to sell the team off to the owners of the rivaling NBL's final champions ever, the Anderson (Duffey) Packers (in brothers Ike W. Duffey and John B. Duffey, with Ike being the primary brother of interest for Walk) due to the Jets going into receivership with $20,000 in debt and rookie George Glamack seeking $50,000 in damages from the Jets franchise (later being joined by Walt Kirk and Leo Mogus for each of them seeking a total of $4,662.51 owed in a lawsuit by them the following month), but the BAA's commissioner, Maurice Podoloff, rejected the sale of the team to a rivaling league's team owner, which subsequently led to them folding operations soon afterward on June 20 that year. As a result, the Jets ceased operations and were subsequently replaced by the Indianapolis Olympians, who were originally meant to be a part of the NBL before the merger occurred.

== BAA Draft ==
Round	Pick	Player	Position	Nationality	College
1	2	George Kok	C	United States	Arkansas
2	14	Ray Lumpp	G	United States	NYU
3	26	Dick Wehr	F	United States	Rice
4	38	Alex Hannum	F/C	United States	USC
5	50	Reede Berg	–	United States	Oregon
6	62	Andy Kostecka	F	United States	Georgetown
7	73	Jack Coleman	–	United States	LSU
8	83	Norman Kohler	–	United States	North Carolina
9	93	Bob Paxton	–	United States	North Carolina
10	102	Jack Phoenix	–	United States	Idaho

Originally, the Jets (formerly known as the Kautskys, which were named after Frank Kautsky and his local Kautsky's grocery store business) were one of four teams to participate in what was planned to be a joint draft procedure between the BAA and the rivaling National Basketball League. However, on the very day before the joint draft was set to commence, plans for it were scrapped when the Indianapolis squad that would since rebrand itself from the Kautskys to the Jets and three other NBL teams in the Fort Wayne (Zollner) Pistons, the runner-up Rochester Royals, and the defending NBL champion Minneapolis Lakers decided to leave the NBL for the BAA, meaning they would participate in the 1948 BAA draft this time around instead or either a joint league draft akin to what the National Football League would later do with the future rivaling American Football League during the late 1960s or the 1948 NBL draft that they were originally meant to be a part of.

== Roster ==
1948–49 Indianapolis Jets roster
Players

Pos.	No.	Player	Height	Weight	DOB	From
F/C	44	Charles B. Black	6 ft 5 in (1.96 m)	200 lb (91 kg)	1921-06-15	Kansas
G/F	66	Price Brookfield	6 ft 4 in (1.93 m)	185 lb (84 kg)	1920-05-11	West Texas A&M
G/F	22	Tommy Byrnes	6 ft 3 in (1.91 m)	175 lb (79 kg)	1923-02-19	Seton Hall
F/C	30, 70	Jack Eskridge	6 ft 5 in (1.96 m)	200 lb (91 kg)	1924-01-21	Kansas
F/C	99	George Glamack	6 ft 6 in (1.98 m)	225 lb (102 kg)	1918-06-07	North Carolina
G/F	22	Bruce Hale	6 ft 1 in (1.85 m)	170 lb (77 kg)	1918-08-30	Santa Clara
G/F	55	Ralph Hamilton	6 ft 1 in (1.85 m)	188 lb (85 kg)	1921-06-10	Indiana
PG	60	Walt Kirk	6 ft 3 in (1.91 m)	173 lb (78 kg)	1924-09-03	Illinois
F	70	Andy Kostecka	6 ft 3 in (1.91 m)	203 lb (92 kg)	1921-02-10	Georgetown
G/F	20	Fred Lewis	6 ft 2 in (1.88 m)	195 lb (88 kg)	1921-01-06	Eastern Kentucky
G	40	Ray Lumpp	6 ft 1 in (1.85 m)	178 lb (81 kg)	1923-07-11	NYU
G/F		Jack Maddox	6 ft 3 in (1.91 m)	185 lb (84 kg)	1919-12-10	West Texas A&M
C	77	John Mahnken	6 ft 8 in (2.03 m)	220 lb (100 kg)	1922-06-16	Georgetown
G	20	Lionel Malamed	5 ft 9 in (1.75 m)	150 lb (68 kg)	1924-11-15	CCNY
F/C	50	John Mandic	6 ft 4 in (1.93 m)	205 lb (93 kg)	1919-10-03	Oregon State
F/C	44	Leo Mogus	6 ft 4 in (1.93 m)	190 lb (86 kg)	1921-04-13	Youngstown State
G/F	33	Fritz Nagy	6 ft 2 in (1.88 m)	185 lb (84 kg)	1924-01-03	Akron
G/F		Paul Napolitano	6 ft 2 in (1.88 m)	185 lb (84 kg)	1923-02-03	San Francisco
G	55	Marty Passaglia	6 ft 1 in (1.85 m)	170 lb (77 kg)	1919-04-22	Santa Clara
F/C		Roy Pugh	6 ft 6 in (1.98 m)	210 lb (95 kg)	1922-10-16	SMU
C		Jim Springer	6 ft 9 in (2.06 m)	235 lb (107 kg)	1926-06-17	Canterbury
G		Jim Spruill	6 ft 2 in (1.88 m)	225 lb (102 kg)	1923-02-26	Rice
G/F	20	Hal Tidrick	6 ft 1 in (1.85 m)	190 lb (86 kg)	1915-08-04	Washington & Jefferson
F/C	77	Blackie Towery	6 ft 4 in (1.93 m)	210 lb (95 kg)	1920-06-20	Western Kentucky
F	60	Dick Wehr	6 ft 4 in (1.93 m)	180 lb (82 kg)	1925-12-09	Rice

Coaches
Head coach

Burl Friddle

Legend
- (DP) Unsigned draft pick
- (FA) Free agent
- (S) Suspended
- Injured

Roster

== Regular season ==
=== Season standings ===
#	Western Division				
#	Team	W	L	PCT	GB
1	x-Rochester Royals	45	15	.750	–
2	x-Minneapolis Lakers	44	16	.733	1
3	x-Chicago Stags	38	22	.633	7
4	x-St. Louis Bombers	29	31	.483	16
5	Fort Wayne Pistons	22	38	.367	23
6	Indianapolis Jets	18	42	.300	27

=== Game log ===
#	Date	Opponent	Score	High points	Venue	Record
1	November 1	St. Louis	W 84–80	George Glamack (25)		1–0
2	November 5	New York	L 71–87	Bruce Hale (19)		1–1
3	November 6	@ Rochester	L 58–69	Andy Kostecka (19)		1–2
4	November 9	Baltimore	L 64–65	Glamack, Lewis (12)		1–3
5	November 13	@ Chicago	L 72–79	Fred Lewis (15)		1–4
6	November 14	@ Fort Wayne	L 73–79	George Glamack (19)		1–5
7	November 16	Philadelphia	L 82–90	Andy Kostecka (15)		1–6
8	November 18	@ Philadelphia	L 71–83	Andy Kostecka (13)		1–7
9	November 19	@ Boston	L 70–75	Bruce Hale (23)		1–8
10	November 20	@ Providence	W 110–107	Bruce Hale (25)		2–8
11	November 23	Minneapolis	L 82–88	Bruce Hale (15)		2–9
12	November 25	Boston	W 81–66	Charles Black (17)		3–9
13	November 27	@ Washington	L 76–94	Bruce Hale (17)		3–10
14	November 30	Fort Wayne	62–77	Fritz Nagy (20)		3–11
15	December 2	@ Baltimore	L 78–90	John Mahnken (19)		3–12
16	December 4	@ New York	L 63–66	Ray Lumpp (16)		3–13
17	December 7	Washington	W 94–78	Ray Lumpp (26)		4–13
18	December 13	New York	L 74–80	Ray Lumpp (27)		4–14
19	December 14	vs. Baltimore	L 75–88	Ray Lumpp (17)		4–15
20	December 15	@ Minneapolis	L 61–79	Charles Black (14)		4–16
21	December 17	Chicago	L 67–71	Ray Lumpp (26)		4–17
22	December 21	Rochester	L 71–84	Carlisle Towery (15)		4–18
23	December 23	Fort Wayne	W 71–60	Ray Lumpp (14)		5–18
24	December 26	@ St. Louis	L 65–75	Carlisle Towery (13)		5–19
25	December 30	@ Philadelphia	L 91–94	Brookfield, Lumpp (20)		5–20
26	January 1	@ Providence	W 78–77	Lumpp, Towery (16)		6–20
27	January 4	New York	W 63–58	Carlisle Towery (20)		7–20
28	January 6	Rochester	W 73–62	Ray Lumpp (21)		8–20
29	January 8	@ Washington	L 81–89	Ray Lumpp (17)		8–21
30	January 9	@ Fort Wayne	L 78–80	Price Brookfield (22)		8–22
31	January 11	Providence	W 90–67	Charles Black (19)		9–22
32	January 14	Chicago	L 61–88	Ray Lumpp (16)		9–23
33	January 16	@ Minneapolis	L 66–75	Carlisle Towery (21)		9–24
34	January 18	Minneapolis	L 56–81	Ralph Hamilton (12)		9–25
35	January 19	vs. Rochester	L 66–70	Walt Kirk (14)		9–26
36	January 23	@ St. Louis	W 91–73	Ray Lumpp (22)		10–26
37	January 25	St. Louis	W 65–53	Black, Brookfield (15)		11–26
38	January 28	Fort Wayne	W 77–63	Lionel Malamed (19)		12–26
39	January 29	vs. Chicago	L 81–87 (OT)	Carlisle Towery (19)		12–27
40	February 1	Washington	W 83–69	Walt Kirk (16)		13–27
41	February 2	@ Washington	L 57–83	Lionel Malamed (17)		13–28
42	February 4	@ Boston	L 64–75	Walt Kirk (17)		13–29
43	February 5	@ Baltimore	L 75–87	Leo Mogus (19)		13–30
44	February 7	Philadelphia	W 90–73	Leo Mogus (22)		14–30
45	February 9	@ Fort Wayne	W 70–67	Carlisle Towery (17)		15–30
46	February 10	@ Philadelphia	L 87–108	Leo Mogus (14)		15–31
47	February 12	@ Providence	L 78–91	Leo Mogus (19)		15–32
48	February 15	Baltimore	L 69–82	Carlisle Towery (17)		15–33
49	February 18	Rochester	L 53–65	Kirk, Mogus (12)		15–34
50	February 19	@ Rochester	L 73–87	Leo Mogus (26)		15–35
51	February 20	@ Chicago	L 72–95	Carlisle Towery (18)		15–36
52	February 22	Boston	W 74–68	Tommy Byrnes (19)		16–36
53	February 26	@ New York	L 76–81	Leo Mogus (24)		16–37
54	March 1	Chicago	W 79–69	Walt Kirk (21)		17–37
55	March 3	Minneapolis	L 79–82	Walt Kirk (24)		17–38
56	March 7	Boston	L 86–107	Leo Mogus (23)		17–39
57	March 9	St. Louis	L 80–81	Walt Kirk (25)		17–40
58	March 12	vs. Minneapolis	L 69–97	Walt Kirk (14)		17–41
59	March 13	@ St. Louis	L 86–87	Price Brookfield (17)		17–42
60	March 15	Providence	W 90–84	Walt Kirk (17)		18–42

== Buyout by the NBA ==
Initially, the Indianapolis Jets planned on continuing to play for another season like every other Basketball Association of America team had done at the time, as noted by the 1949 BAA draft showcasing the Jets participating in that event, with them notably selecting Alex Groza from the University of Kentucky, Leo Barnhorst from the University of Notre Dame, Mac Otten from Bowling Green State University, Bob Evans from Butler University, Charlie Mass from Butler University, Don Boven from Western Michigan University, Jim O'Halloran from the University of Notre Dame, and J. L. Parks from Oklahoma State University as the last selections they'd ever have for the second and final BAA draft that they would ever participate in. However, after the Basketball Association of America (BAA) and National Basketball League (NBL) officially merged to become the National Basketball Association (NBA) on August 3, 1949, the newly formed NBA would purchase up the players from both the BAA's defunct teams (the Indianapolis Jets and Providence Steamrollers) as a means of buying out both of the BAA's teams that didn't make it to the new merger into the NBA. Unlike the Steamrollers, who at least saw seven of their players get bought out and dispersed to the Boston Celtics over a week later, none of the Jets' players would really end up being utilized in a dispersal draft properly since the Jets franchise had already been considered bankrupt beforehand on June 20, 1949, though Mac Otten was slated to have been traded to the Tri-Cities Blackhawks and Don Boven was slated to have been traded to the Waterloo Hawks by the start of what can officially be considered the first proper NBA season. Not only that, but the Jets' first selection in the 1949 draft, Alex Groza, was also previously selected by the NBL's own Indianapolis expansion team that would end up taking the Jets' place once the merger happened, the Indianapolis Olympians, one month before the BAA's draft occurred; the Olympians would end up lasting for four seasons before folding due to Groza's involvement in the CCNY point-shaving scandal of 1951, despite the Olympians being a playoff team for every single season they played in the NBA.
