= Price Brookfield =

American basketball player (1920–2006)

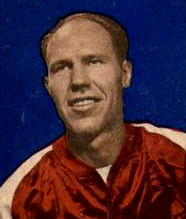
- Brookfield in 1948

Personal information
- Born: May 11, 1920 Floydada, Texas, U.S.
- Died: April 17, 2006 (aged 85) Pinehurst, North Carolina, U.S.
- Listed height: 6 ft 4 in (1.93 m)
- Listed weight: 185 lb (84 kg)

Career information
- High school: Friona (Friona, Texas)
- College: West Texas A&M (1939–1942); Iowa State (1943–1944)
- Playing career: 1946–1951
- Position: Forward / guard
- Number: 66, 17

Career history
- 1945–1946: Baltimore Bullets
- 1946–1947: Chicago American Gears
- 1947–1948: Anderson Duffey Packers
- 1948: Waterloo Hawks
- 1948–1949: Indianapolis Jets
- 1949–1950: Rochester Royals
- 1950–1951: Grand Rapids Hornets

Career highlights
- NBL champion (1947); Consensus first-team All-American (1942)
- Stats at NBA.com
- Stats at Basketball Reference

Emery Price Brookfield (May 11, 1920 – April 17, 2006) was an American professional basketball and baseball player.

Brookfield played college basketball for the West Texas A&M Buffaloes and Iowa State Cyclones. He played professionally for the Indianapolis Jets and Rochester Royals of the Basketball Association of America (BAA)) and National Basketball Association (NBA) for 61 games.

Brookfield also played baseball for the Borger Gassers of the West Texas–New Mexico League as a pitcher in 1942 and 1946.

Brookfield served in the United States Navy during World War II. After his retirement from playing, he coached high school basketball, baseball and golf in Indiana. Brookfield died in his home in Pinehurst, North Carolina.

== BAA/NBA career statistics ==
Legend
GP	Games played	FG%	Field-goal percentage
FT%	Free-throw percentage	APG	Assists per game
PPG	Points per game	**Bold**	Career high

=== Regular season ===
Year	Team	GP	FG%	FT%	APG	PPG
1948–49	Indianapolis	**54**	.276	.720	**2.5**	**8.2**
1949–50	Rochester	7	**.478**	**.923**	.1	4.9
Career		61	.283	.739	2.2	7.8
