= Irv Rothenberg =

American basketball player

Personal information
- Born: December 31, 1921 Bronx, New York, U.S.
- Died: July 18, 2009 (aged 87) Delray Beach, Florida, U.S.
- Listed height: 6 ft 7 in (2.01 m)
- Listed weight: 215 lb (98 kg)

Career information
- High school: Roosevelt (New York City, New York)
- College: LIU Brooklyn (1941–1944)
- BAA draft: 1947: -- round, --
- Drafted by: Washington Capitols
- Playing career: 1944–1951
- Position: Center
- Number: 6, 18, 35, 3

Career history
- 1944–1945: Philadelphia Sphas
- 1945–1946: New York Gothams
- 1946–1947: Cleveland Rebels
- 1947: Washington Capitols
- 1947–1948: Baltimore Bullets
- 1948: St. Louis Bombers
- 1948–1949: New York Knicks
- 1949–1951: Paterson Crescents
- Stats at NBA.com
- Stats at Basketball Reference

Irwin Paul Rothenberg (December 31, 1921 – July 18, 2009) was an American professional basketball player. He played for the Cleveland Rebels, Washington Capitols, Baltimore Bullets, St. Louis Bombers, and New York Knicks of the Basketball Association of America (now known as the National Basketball Association). Rothenberg also played in the American Basketball League for the Philadelphia Sphas, New York Gothams, and Paterson Crescents.

== College career ==
Rothenberg played college basketball at Long Island University where his team qualified for the 1942 NIT.

== Professional career ==
=== American Basketball League career ===
For the 1944–45 season, Rothenberg played for the Philadelphia Sphas where they won the league title.

For the 1945–46 season, Rothenberg played for the New York Gothams.

For the 1949–50 and 1950–51 seasons, Rothenberg played for the Paterson Crescents.

=== Basketball Association of America career ===
For the 1946–47 BAA season, Rothenberg played for the Cleveland Rebels.

For the 1947–48 BAA season, Rothenberg played for the Washington Capitols, Baltimore Bullets, and St. Louis Bombers. That season, he led the BAA in games played

For the 1948–49 BAA season, Rothenberg played for the New York Knicks.

== BAA career statistics ==
Legend
GP	Games played	FG%	Field-goal percentage
FT%	Free-throw percentage	APG	Assists per game
PPG	Points per game	**Bold**	Career high

=== Regular season ===
Year	Team	GP	FG%	FT%	APG	PPG
1946–47	Cleveland	29	.216	.556	.5	3.5
1947–48	Washington	11	.250	**.762**	.1	4.2
1947–48	Baltimore	14	**.291**	.478	.1	4.4
1947–48	St. Louis	24	.289	.566	.2	**7.8**
1948–49	New York	**53**	.275	.644	**1.3**	5.9
Career		131	.267	.606	.7	5.4

=== Playoffs ===
Year	Team	GP	FG%	FT%	APG	PPG
1948	St. Louis	5	.147	**.571**	.0	**2.8**
1949	New York	**6**	**.211**	.200	**.3**	1.7
Career		11	.170	.353	.2	2.2
