= Jack Maddox =

American basketball player

Personal information
- Born: December 10, 1919 Medicine Mound, Texas, U.S.
- Died: July 9, 2006 (aged 86)
- Listed height: 6 ft 3 in (1.91 m)
- Listed weight: 185 lb (84 kg)

Career information
- High school: Wichita Falls (Wichita Falls, Texas)
- College: West Texas A&M (1940–1943)
- Playing career: 1946–1949
- Position: Forward / guard

Career history
- 1946–1948: Oshkosh All-Stars
- 1948–1949: Hammond Calumet Buccaneers
- 1949: Indianapolis Jets

Career highlights
- Second-team All-American – MSG (1942); First-team All-Border Conference (1942)
- Stats at NBA.com
- Stats at Basketball Reference

Jack Clinton Maddox (December 10, 1919 – July 9, 2006) was an American professional basketball player.

== Early life ==
Maddox received an athletic scholarship to play for the SMU Mustangs but was declared academically ineligible in February 1939. He transferred to the West Texas A&M Buffaloes where he played for three years before joining the Marines. While in the Marines, he played basketball for the Pearl Harbor team.

== Professional career ==
Maddox played in the National Basketball League for the Oshkosh All-Stars and Hammond Calumet Buccaneers between 1946 and 1949, then for the Indianapolis Jets in the Basketball Association of America in 1949 for one game.

== Later life ==
After his professional career, Maddox returned to Texas. He worked as a cowboy and a rancher, and was a calf roper in rodeos while also coaching basketball at Blossom High School.

== BAA career statistics ==
Legend
GP	Games played
FG%	Field-goal percentage
FT%	Free-throw percentage
APG	Assists per game
PPG	Points per game

=== Regular season ===
Year	Team	GP	FG%	FT%	APG	PPG
1948–49	Indianapolis	1	.000	.000	1.0	.0
Career		1	.000	.000	1.0	.0
