= Lionel Malamed =

American basketball player (1924–1989)

Personal information
- Born: November 15, 1924 New York City, New York
- Died: September 17, 1989 (aged 64)
- Listed height: 5 ft 9 in (1.75 m)
- Listed weight: 150 lb (68 kg)

Career information
- High school: James Monroe (Bronx, New York)
- College: CCNY (1942–1943, 1945–1948)
- BAA draft: 1948: undrafted
- Playing career: 1948–1950
- Position: Guard
- Number: 20, 12

Career history
- 1948: Indianapolis Jets
- 1948–1949: Rochester Royals
- 1949–1950: Paterson Crescents
- Stats at NBA.com
- Stats at Basketball Reference

Lionel M. Malamed (November 15, 1924 – September 17, 1989) was an American professional basketball player.

A 5'9" guard from the City College of New York, Lionel played one season (1948–49) in the National Basketball Association as a member of the Indianapolis Jets and Rochester Royals. He averaged 5.9 points in 44 games. He had a wife, with whom he had two sons.

Malamed later worked in Wall Street and served as vice president of Herbert Young & Company. He died of a heart attack at the age of 64.

== BAA career statistics ==
Legend
GP	Games played	FG%	Field-goal percentage
FT%	Free-throw percentage	APG	Assists per game
PPG	Points per game	**Bold**	Career high

=== Regular season ===
Year	Team	GP	FG%	FT%	APG	PPG
1948–49	Indianapolis	**35**	.328	**.841**	**1.6**	**6.5**
1948–49	Rochester	9	**.387**	.750	.7	3.3
Career		44	.334	.831	1.4	5.9

== See also ==
- List of shortest players in National Basketball Association history
