= 1948–49 Chicago Stags season =

- Head coach: Harold Olsen (28–21); Philip Brownstein (10–1)
- Arena: Chicago Stadium

Results
- Record: 38–22 (.633)
- Place: Division: 3rd (Western)
- Playoff finish: West Division Semifinals (eliminated 0-2)
- Stats at Basketball Reference

Local media
- Television: none
- Radio: none

The 1948–49 BAA season was the Stags' 3rd season in the NBA/BAA. This season would also see both the Stags and the St. Louis Bombers get their Western Division shifted up in a significant way due to four of the teams from the rivaling National Basketball League (NBL) in the former NBL champion Minneapolis Lakers, Rochester Royals, Fort Wayne Pistons, and Indianapolis Jets defecting from the NBL into the Basketball Association of America (BAA) this season. Despite this significant shift from the Western Division, the Stags would still remain as one of the better teams in the league this season with a 38–22 record, though they were ultimately swept in the 1949 BAA playoffs in the Western Division Semifinals by the eventual champion Minneapolis Lakers. Following the conclusino of this season, the Stags were one of ten BAA teams (removing only the former NBL turned BAA Indianapolis Jets and the Providence Steamrollers teams) to join up with six of the surviving nine NBL teams (with an expansion team in the Indianapolis Olympians also being added) to create the present-day National Basketball Association.

== Draft ==
Round	Pick	Player	Position	Nationality	College
1	5	Ed Mikan	F/C	United States	DePaul
2	17	Hook Dillon	F	United States	North Carolina
3	29	Whitey Kachan	G	United States	DePaul
4	41	Odie Spears	G	United States	Western Kentucky
5	53	Mickey Marty	F	United States	Loras
6	65	Ed Mills	–	United States	Wisconsin
7	76	Don Reagan	–	United States	Murray State
8	86	Joe Shafer	–	United States	Wheaton
9	96	Fred Weber	–	United States	Siena

Top selection Ed Mikan is the younger brother of Minneapolis Lakers star center George Mikan.

== Roster ==
1948–49 Chicago Stags roster
Players

Pos.	No.	Player	Height	Weight	DOB	From
F/C	11, 13	Mike Bloom	6 ft 6 in (1.98 m)	190 lb (86 kg)	1915-01-14	Temple
C	18	Jim Browne	6 ft 10 in (2.08 m)	235 lb (107 kg)	1930-01-01	Tilden HS (IL)
F/C		Jack Eskridge	6 ft 5 in (1.96 m)	200 lb (91 kg)	1924-01-21	Kansas
F/C	17	Chuck Gilmur	6 ft 4 in (1.93 m)	225 lb (102 kg)	1918-11-22	Washington
F/C	15	Joe Graboski	6 ft 7 in (2.01 m)	195 lb (88 kg)	1930-01-15	Tuley HS (IL)
G	4	Whitey Kachan	6 ft 2 in (1.88 m)	175 lb (79 kg)	1925-09-15	DePaul
G/F	6	Carl Meinhold	6 ft 2 in (1.88 m)	185 lb (84 kg)	1926-03-29	Long Island
F/C	7	Stan Miasek	6 ft 5 in (1.96 m)	210 lb (95 kg)	1924-08-08	Textile HS (NY)
C	18	Ed Mikan	6 ft 8 in (2.03 m)	230 lb (104 kg)	1925-10-20	DePaul
F	6	Bill Miller	6 ft 3 in (1.91 m)	190 lb (86 kg)	1924-11-24	North Carolina
G/F	19	Andy Phillip	6 ft 2 in (1.88 m)	195 lb (88 kg)	1922-03-07	Illinois
C	11	Bill Roberts	6 ft 9 in (2.06 m)	210 lb (95 kg)	1925-03-13	Wyoming
PG	16	Kenny Rollins	6 ft 0 in (1.83 m)	168 lb (76 kg)	1923-09-14	Kentucky
SF	20	Odie Spears	6 ft 5 in (1.96 m)	205 lb (93 kg)	1925-06-26	Western Kentucky
G/F	12	Gene Vance	6 ft 3 in (1.91 m)	195 lb (88 kg)	1923-02-25	Illinois
SG	10	Max Zaslofsky	6 ft 2 in (1.88 m)	170 lb (77 kg)	1925-12-07	St. John's

Coaches
Head coach

Philip Brownstein

Legend
- (DP) Unsigned draft pick
- (FA) Free agent
- (S) Suspended
- Injured

Roster

== Regular season ==
=== Season standings ===
#	Western Division				
#	Team	W	L	PCT	GB
1	x-Rochester Royals	45	15	.750	–
2	x-Minneapolis Lakers	44	16	.733	1
3	x-Chicago Stags	38	22	.633	7
4	x-St. Louis Bombers	29	31	.483	16
5	Fort Wayne Pistons	22	38	.367	23
6	Indianapolis Jets	18	42	.300	27

=== Game log ===
#	Date	Opponent	Score	High points	Venue	Record
1	November 6	Baltimore	W 82–69	Max Zaslofsky (24)		1–0
2	November 13	Indianapolis	W 79–72	Max Zaslofsky (20)		2–0
3	November 19	Minneapolis	L 81–85	Max Zaslofsky (22)		2–1
4	November 21	@ Fort Wayne	W 70–69	Max Zaslofsky (15)		3–1
5	November 27	@ Rochester	L 103–105 (2OT)	Max Zaslofsky (21)		3–2
6	November 30	Philadelphia	W 74–68	Andy Phillip (19)		4–2
7	December 1	@ St. Louis	L 61–72	Max Zaslofsky (15)		4–3
8	December 4	Minneapolis	W 104–100 (OT)	Max Zaslofsky (29)		5–3
9	December 5	@ Fort Wayne	W 88–79	Kenny Rollins (22)		6–3
10	December 10	Fort Wayne	W 78–70	Max Zaslofsky (22)		7–3
11	December 13	vs Baltimore	W 75–70	Andy Phillip (19)		8–3
12	December 14	Rochester	L 78–85	Max Zaslofsky (20)		8–4
13	December 17	@ Indianapolis	W 71–67	Max Zaslofsky (21)		9–4
14	December 19	@ Minneapolis	L 84–94	Max Zaslofsky (35)		9–5
15	December 23	@ Baltimore	L 89–96	Max Zaslofsky (25)		9–6
16	December 25	@ New York	W 70–64	Andy Phillip (18)		10–6
17	December 26	Boston	W 84–73	Max Zaslofsky (22)		11–6
18	December 28	@ Boston	W 76–74	Max Zaslofsky (22)		12–6
19	December 30	@ Providence	W 101–89	Max Zaslofsky (24)		13–6
20	January 1	@ Washington	L 90–92	Andy Phillip (23)		13–7
21	January 2	New York	W 81–79	Max Zaslofsky (21)		14–7
22	January 4	@ Providence	W 115–104	Max Zaslofsky (21)		15–7
23	January 6	@ Providence	W 89–78	Odie Spears (18)		16–7
24	January 8	@ Rochester	W 91–88	Ed Mikan (21)		17–7
25	January 9	Rochester	L 75–90	Max Zaslofsky (22)		17–8
26	January 12	@ St. Louis	W 75–66	Odie Spears (26)		18–8
27	January 14	@ Indianapolis	W 88–61	Max Zaslofsky (27)		19–8
28	January 15	vs Boston	W 94–86	Kenny Rollins (21)		20–8
29	January 16	Washington	W 92–70	Max Zaslofsky (25)		21–8
30	January 19	Fort Wayne	L 96–104 (2OT)	Max Zaslofsky (24)		21–9
31	January 20	@ Philadelphia	L 72–92	Max Zaslofsky (24)		21–10
32	January 21	@ Boston	W 86–76	Max Zaslofsky (24)		22–10
33	January 25	Philadelphia	77–86	Max Zaslofsky (21)		22–11
34	January 26	@ Minneapolis	L 49–84	Stan Miasek (11)		22–12
35	January 28	St. Louis	W 83–65	Max Zaslofsky (26)		23–12
36	January 29	vs Indianapolis	W 87–81 (OT)	Ed Mikan (23)		24–12
37	February 2	Baltimore	W 77–67	Max Zaslofsky (23)		25–12
38	February 5	@ Providence	W 91–75	Max Zaslofsky (24)		26–12
39	February 6	@ New York	W 87–75	Max Zaslofsky (26)		27–12
40	February 8	St. Louis	L 73–75	Max Zaslofsky (24)		27–13
41	February 11	Minneapolis	W 105–97	Stan Miasek (28)		28–13
42	February 12	@ Rochester	L 73–87	Max Zaslofsky (19)		28–14
43	February 15	Fort Wayne	W 83–69	Max Zaslofsky (17)		29–14
44	February 16	@ Minneapolis	L 71–90	Mikan, Phillip (14)		29–15
45	February 19	@ St. Louis	L 59–63	Andy Phillip (14)		29–16
46	February 20	Indianapolis	95–72	Andy Phillip (22)		30–16
47	February 23	@ Philadelphia	W 102–85	Gene Vance (22)		31–16
48	February 24	@ Baltimore	W 87–68	Max Zaslofsky (14)		32–16
49	February 26	@ Washington	103–90	Max Zaslofsky (35)		33–16
50	February 28	Washington	L 57–67	Max Zaslofsky (20)		33–17
51	March 1	@ Indianapolis	69–79	Ed Mikan (20)		33–18
52	March 2	@ New York	L 79–81	Max Zaslofsky (32)		33–19
53	March 3	@ Philadelphia	L 75–90	Max Zaslofsky (24)		33–20
54	March 5	@ Washington	W 106–95	Max Zaslofsky (23)		34–20
55	March 8	Providence	W 110–82	Max Zaslofsky (25)		35–20
56	March 12	New York	L 80–85	Max Zaslofsky (19)		35–21
57	March 13	@ Fort Wayne	L 78–81	Stan Miasek (12)		35–22
58	March 16	vs Boston	W 107–82	Max Zaslofsky (29)		36–22
59	March 17	St. Louis	W 85–79	Max Zaslofsky (33)		37–22
60	March 20	Rochester	W 98–61	Odie Spears (24)		38–22

== BAA Playoffs ==
=== BAA West Division Semifinals ===
(2) Minneapolis Lakers vs. (3) Chicago Stags: Lakers win series 2-0

- Game 1 @ Minneapolis: Minneapolis 84, Chicago 77
- Game 2 @ Chicago: Minneapolis 101, Chicago 85

Last Playoff Meeting: This is the first meeting between the Stags and Lakers.

== Awards and records ==
- Max Zaslofsky, All-BAA First Team
