= Sid Tanenbaum =

American basketball player

Personal information
- Born: October 8, 1925 Brooklyn, New York, U.S.
- Died: September 4, 1986 (aged 60) Queens, New York, U.S.
- Listed height: 6 ft 0 in (1.83 m)
- Listed weight: 160 lb (73 kg)

Career information
- High school: Thomas Jefferson (Brooklyn, New York)
- College: NYU (1943–1947)
- BAA draft: 1947: undrafted
- Playing career: 1947–1949
- Position: Guard
- Number: 6, 9

Career history
- 1947–1949: New York Knicks
- 1949: Baltimore Bullets

Career highlights
- 2× Consensus first-team All-American (1946, 1947); 2× Haggerty Award winner (1946, 1947)

Career BAA statistics
- Points: 633 (9.0 ppg)
- Assists: 162 (2.3 apg)
- Stats at NBA.com
- Stats at Basketball Reference

Sidney Harold Tanenbaum (October 8, 1925 – September 4, 1986) was an American professional basketball player. Playing college basketball for the NYU Violets, he was twice a consensus first-team All-American (in 1946 and 1947) and twice a Haggerty Award winner (1946 and 1947). He went on to play professionally for the New York Knicks and the Baltimore Bullets.

== Early life ==
Tanenbaum was born in Brooklyn, New York, grew up in its Brownsville neighborhood, and was Jewish. He was an all-scholastic player at Thomas Jefferson High School. He met his wife, Bobbie Wolfson, in college when he was a junior.

== Basketball career ==
A 6' 0" guard/forward, Tanenbaum played college basketball at New York University, where he was captain of the team in 1947, and was a two-time All-American and two-time Haggerty Award winner as the outstanding player in the metropolitan area. He also won the 1947 Bar Kochba Award, which honored him as the best Jewish American athlete in the nation, and was named first team All-Met in all four of his varsity seasons. Wilbur Wood, the sports editor of the New York Sun, wrote of Tanenbaum in 1947: "He is the finest all-around basketball performer ever to don Violet livery." He left NYU as the school's all-time leading scorer, with 992 points. NYU annually awards its top student-athlete the Sid Tanenbaum Memorial Award.

Tanenbaum played two seasons (1947–1949) in the Basketball Association of America as a member of the New York Knicks and Baltimore Bullets. On February 11, 1949, the New York Knicks traded him to the Baltimore Bullets for Connie Simmons. He scored 633 points in 70 games and tallied 162 assists. He was inducted into the New York City Basketball Hall of Fame, and in 1997 into the International Jewish Sports Hall of Fame.

== Personal life ==
After his basketball career, Tanenbaum lived in Woodmere, New York, with his wife Barbara and sons Steven and Michael (an optometrist). He owned a machine shop specializing in metal spinning and stamping in Far Rockaway, Queens, known as the Able Metal Spinning and Stamping.

== Murder ==
Tanenbaum was murdered on September 4, 1986, aged 60, when he was stabbed to death by a local 37-year-old woman in his shop. Police described Tanenbaum as "something of a benefactor in his neighborhood" who often gave money to people living in the streets. According to reports, he was stabbed because he decided to stop lending money to his attacker after assisting her many times in the past, and when he turned his back she attacked him. His killer, Molly Dotsun, was sentenced to 21 years in prison.

The basketball courts at the park in North Woodmere, New York, are named after Tanenbaum. Since 1986, they have hosted the Sid Tanenbaum Memorial Basketball Tournament that raises scholarship money for students in the Five Towns.

== BAA career statistics ==
Legend
GP	Games played	FG%	Field-goal percentage
FT%	Free-throw percentage	APG	Assists per game
PPG	Points per game	**Bold**	Career high

=== Regular season ===
Year	Team	GP	FG%	FT%	APG	PPG
1947–48	New York	24	.250	.838	1.5	**10.1**
1948–49	New York	**32**	.283	**.844**	2.2	8.0
1948–49	Baltimore	14	**.309**	.791	**3.9**	9.6
Career		70	.274	.830	2.3	9.0

=== Playoffs ===
Year	Team	GP	FG%	FT%	APG	PPG
1948	New York	**3**	**.333**	.727	1.3	**10.0**
1949	Baltimore	**3**	.207	**1.000**	**3.3**	5.7
Career		6	.274	.813	2.3	7.8

== See also ==
- List of select Jewish basketball players
