= Gene James =

American basketball player

Personal information
- Born: February 15, 1925 Ironton, Ohio
- Died: July 6, 1997 (aged 72) Sarasota, Florida
- Listed height: 6 ft 4 in (1.93 m)
- Listed weight: 180 lb (82 kg)

Career information
- High school: Stonewall Jackson (Charleston, West Virginia)
- College: Marshall (1942–1943, 1946–1948)
- BAA draft: 1948: undrafted
- Playing career: 1949–1951
- Position: Forward
- Number: 14, 5

Career history
- 1949–1950: New York Knicks
- 1950–1951: Baltimore Bullets

Career highlights
- NAIA champion (1947); AP honorable mention All-American (1948)
- Stats at NBA.com
- Stats at Basketball Reference

Harold Gene James (February 15, 1925 – July 6, 1997) was an American professional basketball player. He played for the New York Knicks and Baltimore Bullets between 1948 and 1951 while averaging 3.4 points per game for his career.

== BAA/NBA career statistics ==
Legend
GP	Games played	FG%	Field-goal percentage
FT%	Free-throw percentage	RPG	Rebounds per game
APG	Assists per game	PPG	Points per game
**Bold**	Career high

=== Regular season ===
Year	Team	GP	FG%	FT%	RPG	APG	PPG
1948–49	New York	11	**.375**	.500	–	.5	3.8
1949–50	New York	29	.297	.452	–	.7	1.8
1950–51	New York	6	.333	.500	.7	.7	.5
1950–51	Baltimore	**42**	.336	**.623**	**3.3**	**1.6**	4.7
Career		88	.334	.561	2.9	1.1	3.4

=== Playoffs ===
Year	Team	GP	FG%	FT%	RPG	APG	PPG
1949	New York	**3**	.000	**.500**	–	**.7**	.7
1950	New York	1	**.333**	.000	–	.0	**2.0**
Career		4	.111	.500	–	.5	1.0
