= Carlisle Towery =

American basketball player

Personal information
- Born: June 20, 1920 Caldwell County, Kentucky, U.S.
- Died: November 25, 2012 (aged 92) Marion, Kentucky, U.S.
- Listed height: 6 ft 5 in (1.96 m)
- Listed weight: 210 lb (95 kg)

Career information
- High school: Shady Grove (Shady Grove, Kentucky)
- College: Western Kentucky (1938–1941)
- Playing career: 1941–1950
- Position: Power forward / center
- Number: 24, 77, 10

Career history
- 1941–1944, 1946–1948: Fort Wayne (Zollner) Pistons
- 1948–1949: Indianapolis Jets
- 1949–1950: Baltimore Bullets

Career highlights
- NBL champion (1944); Second-team All-American – Converse (1941); Third-team All-American – Converse (1940); No. 42 jersey retired by Western Kentucky Hilltoppers
- Stats at NBA.com
- Stats at Basketball Reference

William Carlisle Towery (June 20, 1920 – November 25, 2012), nicknamed "Blackie" or "Big Boy", was an American professional basketball player.

A 6-foot-5-inch (1.96 m) power forward-center, Towery played for the Western Kentucky University Hilltoppers from 1938 to 1941. He was a two-time All-America selection and the first Hilltopper to score 1,000 points. He also led the Hilltoppers to three Southern Intercollegiate Athletic Association titles.

After graduating, Towery began his professional career with the Fort Wayne Zollner Pistons of the National Basketball League. He played three seasons with the Pistons before entering military service in World War II, where he earned a Bronze Star as an infantryman. He then returned to the Pistons in 1946, and remained with the team as they joined the Basketball Association of America (the modern NBA) in 1948. Towery spent half a season with the Pistons in the BAA, and later served stints for the Indianapolis Jets and Baltimore Bullets. When he retired from basketball in 1950, he had scored 2,317 combined NBL/NBA points.

In 2003, Western Kentucky University retired his #42 college jersey. He became the sixth Hilltopper to receive such honors. Towery died on November 25, 2012, at the age of 92.

== BAA/NBA career statistics ==
Legend
GP	Games played	FG%	Field-goal percentage
FT%	Free-throw percentage	APG	Assists per game
PPG	Points per game	**Bold**	Career high

=== Regular season ===
Year	Team	GP	FG%	FT%	APG	PPG
1948–49	Fort Wayne	22	.259	.712	1.6	7.5
1948–49	Indianapolis	38	.265	.753	**3.6**	**11.5**
1949–50	Baltimore	**68**	**.327**	**.757**	2.1	8.8
Career		128	.293	.748	2.4	9.4
