= Matt Zunic =

American basketball player (1919–2006)

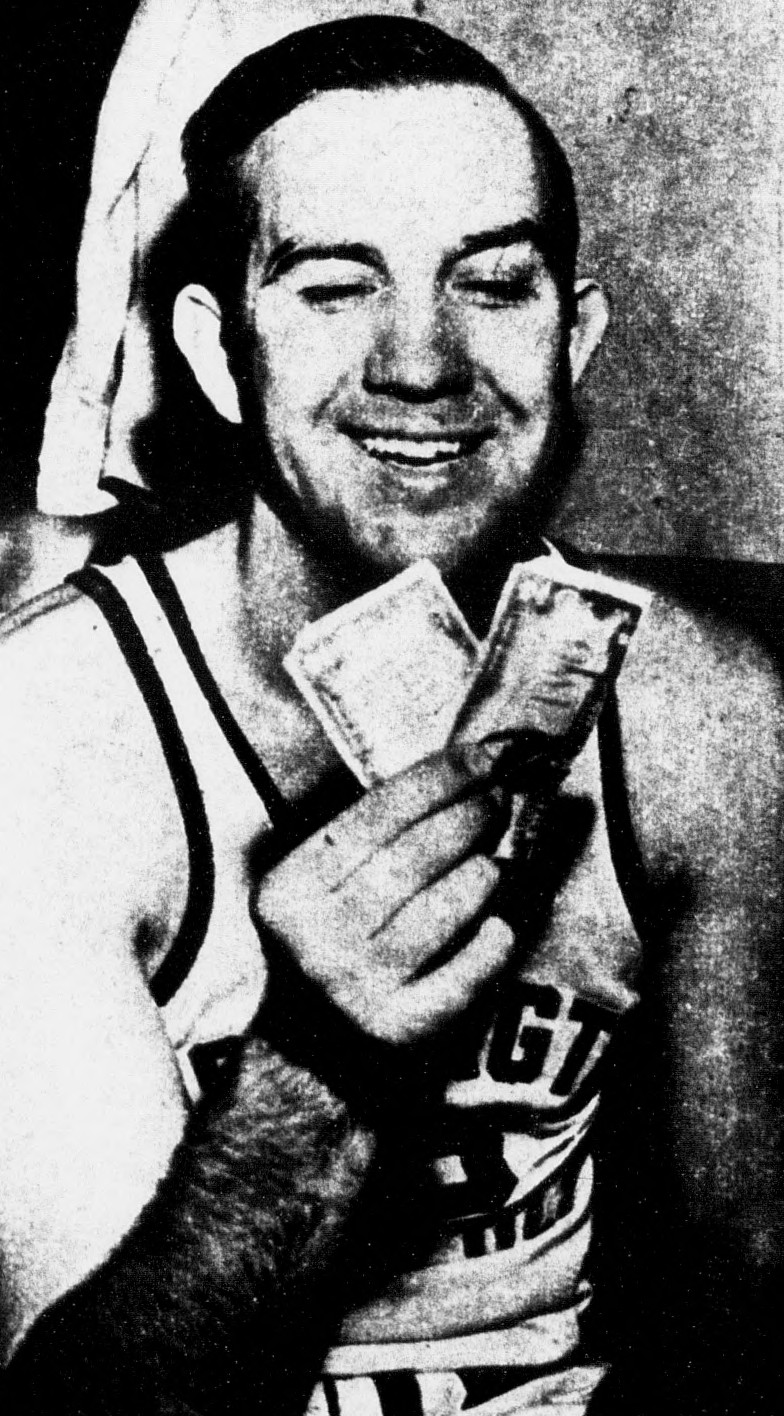
- Zunic, circa 1949

Personal information
- Born: September 19, 1919 Renton, Pennsylvania, U.S.
- Died: December 15, 2006 (aged 87) Lecanto, Florida, U.S.
- Listed height: 6 ft 3 in (1.91 m)
- Listed weight: 195 lb (88 kg)

Career information
- High school: New Kensington (New Kensington, Pennsylvania)
- College: George Washington (1938–1942)
- BAA draft: 1947: – round, –
- Drafted by: Washington Capitols
- Playing career: 1945–1949
- Position: Guard / forward
- Number: 18
- Coaching career: 1947–1976

Career history

Playing
- 1945–1948: Midland/Flint Dow A.C.'s
- 1948–1949: Washington Capitols

Coaching
- 1947–1948: Flint Dow A.C.'s (interim HC)
- 1950–1951: George Washington (assistant)
- 1951–1952: UMass (assistant)
- 1952–1959: Boston University
- 1959–1963: UMass
- 1963–1965: Pittsfield Merchants
- 1968: Springfield Hall of Famers
- 1970–1971: Hartford Capitols
- 1972–1976: Westfield State

Career highlights
- As player: Second-team All-SoCon (1942)
- Stats at NBA.com
- Stats at Basketball Reference

Matthew J. Zunic (September 19, 1919 – December 15, 2006) was an American professional basketball player and coach. He played college basketball at the George Washington University. A 6'3" guard, he played one season in the Basketball Association of America (BAA), a precursor to the NBA. He averaged 4.9 points per game for the Washington Capitols.

He later coached at Boston University and the University of Massachusetts. He coached seven season at BU (1952–53 through 1958–59), compiling a 96–58 record (.623). He then moved to the University of Massachusetts, coaching for four seasons (1959–60 through 1962–63), compiling a 57–41 record (.582). In the 1961–62 season, Massachusetts won their first Yankee Conference title, and played in the school's first NCAA tournament.

== BAA career statistics ==
Legend
GP	Games played
FG%	Field-goal percentage
FT%	Free-throw percentage
APG	Assists per game
PPG	Points per game

=== Regular season ===
Year	Team	GP	FG%	FT%	APG	PPG
1948–49	Washington	56	.303	.706	.9	4.9
Career		56	.303	.706	.9	4.9

=== Playoffs ===
Year	Team	GP	FG%	FT%	APG	PPG
1949	Washington	9	.179	.632	.7	2.9
Career		9	.179	.632	.7	2.9

== Head coaching record ==
Record table
Season	Team	Overall	Conference	Standing	Postseason
Boston University (Independent) (1952–1959)
1952–53	Boston University	10–10			
1953–54	Boston University	9–11			
1954–55	Boston University	12–9			
1955–56	Boston University	17–6			
1956–57	Boston University	13–10			
1957–58	Boston University	15–5			
1958–59	Boston University	20–7			NCAA Regional Runner-up
Boston University:		96–58			
Massachusetts (Yankee Conference) (1959–1963)
1959–60	Massachusetts	14–10	6–4		
1960–61	Massachusetts	16–10	4–6		
1961–62	Massachusetts	15–9	8–2	1st	NCAA 1st Round
1962–63	Massachusetts	12–12	6–4	3rd	
Massachusetts:		57–41	24–16		
Total:		153–99			
National champion Postseason invitational champion Conference regular season champion Conference regular season and conference tournament champion Division regular season champion Division regular season and conference tournament champion Conference tournament champion
