= Dick Shrider =

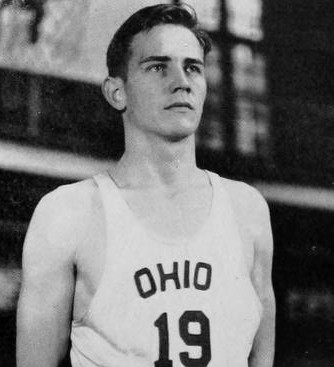
- Shrider, circa 1947

Personal information
- Born: February 7, 1923 Glenford, Ohio, U.S.
- Died: January 21, 2014 (aged 90) Somerville, Ohio, U.S.
- Listed height: 6 ft 2 in (1.88 m)
- Listed weight: 190 lb (86 kg)

Career information
- High school: Glenford (Thornville, Ohio)
- College: Ohio (1946–1947)
- NBA draft: 1948: -- round, --
- Drafted by: New York Knicks
- Position: Guard
- Number: 7

Career history

Playing
- 1948: New York Knicks
- 1948: Detroit Vagabond Kings

Coaching
- 1949–1955: Gallipolis HS
- 1955–1957: Fairborn HS
- 1957–1966: Miami (Ohio)
- Stats at NBA.com
- Stats at Basketball Reference

Richard Guy Shrider (February 7, 1923 – January 21, 2014) was an American professional basketball player and college coach. Shrider was selected in the 1948 BAA Draft by the New York Knicks after a collegiate career at Ohio. He played for the Knicks for four total games in 1948 before then playing in the National Basketball League for the Detroit Vagabond Kings.

== Coaching career ==
Shrider then became a high school boys' basketball coach at Gallipolis High School until 1955, at which point he took over the boys' basketball team at Fairborn High School. In 1957, Miami University of Ohio named him as their new head coach. In 1957–58, his first season, Shrider's Redskins (now RedHawks) went undefeated against Mid-American Conference (MAC) opponents. They became the first MAC team to ever win an NCAA Tournament game that year as well. During Shrider's nine seasons as Miami's head coach he led them to four MAC championships and two NCAA Tournament appearances (1958, 1966). He compiled an overall record of 126–96, and in 1996 he was named an honoree of the school's "Cradle of Coaches" award.

After retiring from coaching in 1966, Shrider stayed as the school's athletic director until 1988.

== BAA career statistics ==
Legend
GP	Games played
FG%	Field-goal percentage
FT%	Free-throw percentage
APG	Assists per game
PPG	Points per game

=== Regular season ===
Year	Team	GP	FG%	FT%	APG	PPG
1948–49	New York	4	.000	.333	.5	.3
Career		4	.000	.333	.5	.3

== Head coaching record ==
=== College ===
Record table
Season	Team	Overall	Conference	Standing	Postseason
Miami Redskins (Mid-American Conference) (1957–1966)
1957–58	Miami (OH)	18–9	12–0	1st	NCAA Regional semifinals
1958–59	Miami (OH)	14–11	9–3	T–1st	
1959–60	Miami (OH)	8–16	6–6	T–3rd	
1960–61	Miami (OH)	12–12	7–5	3rd	
1961–62	Miami (OH)	7–17	3–9	6th	
1962–63	Miami (OH)	12–12	8–4	T–2nd	
1963–64	Miami (OH)	17–7	9–3	2nd	
1964–65	Miami (OH)	20–5	11–1	T–1st	
1965–66	Miami (OH)	18–7	11–1	1st	NCAA First round
Miami (OH):		126–96	76–32		
Total:		126–96			
National champion Postseason invitational champion Conference regular season champion Conference regular season and conference tournament champion Division regular season champion Division regular season and conference tournament champion Conference tournament champion
