= Fritz Nagy =

American basketball player (1924–1989)

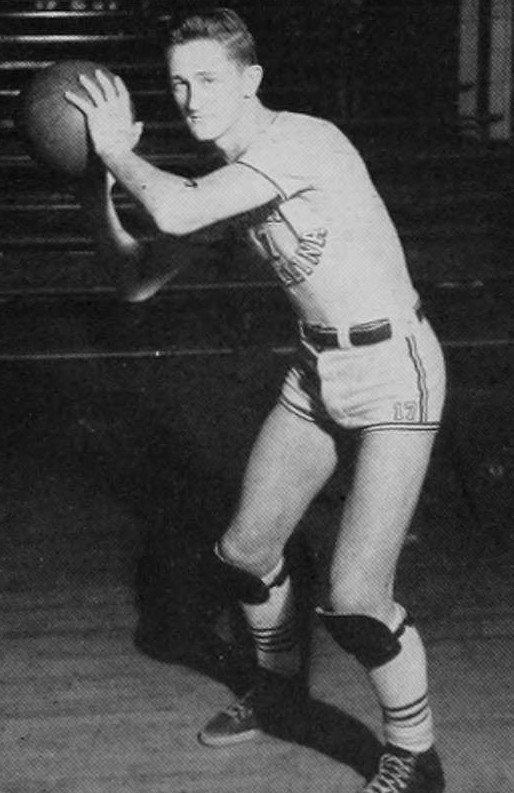
- Nagy, circa 1943

Personal information
- Born: January 3, 1924 Akron, Ohio, U.S.
- Died: June 5, 1989 (aged 65) Cuyahoga Falls, Ohio, U.S.
- Listed height: 6 ft 2 in (1.88 m)
- Listed weight: 185 lb (84 kg)

Career information
- High school: South (Akron, Ohio)
- College: North Carolina (1942–1943); Akron (1943–1947)
- NBA draft: 1947: -- round, --
- Drafted by: Pittsburgh Ironmen
- Playing career: 1947–1949
- Position: Small forward / shooting guard
- Number: 33

Career history
- 1947: Chicago American Gears
- 1948–1949: Indianapolis Kautskys / Jets
- 1950–1951: Grand Rapids Hornets

Career highlights
- Second-team All-American – SN (1945)

Career BAA statistics
- Points: 253 (5.1 ppg)
- Assists: 68 (1.4 apg)
- Stats at NBA.com
- Stats at Basketball Reference

Frederick Karl "Fritz" Nagy (January 3, 1924 – June 5, 1989) was an American professional basketball player in the Basketball Association of America (BAA). Selected by the Pittsburgh Ironmen in the 1947 BAA draft, Fritz played for just one season, 1948–49, with the Indianapolis Jets.

Nagy played basketball at South High School in Akron, He attended college at North Carolina for one season, leading the Southern Conference with 201 points in the 1942–43 season. He then transferred to Akron, playing for the Zips from 1943 to 1947.

== BAA career statistics ==
Legend
GP	Games played	FG%	Field-goal percentage
FT%	Free-throw percentage	APG	Assists per game
PPG	Points per game	**Bold**	Career high

=== Regular season ===
Year	Team	GP	FG%	FT%	APG	PPG
1948–49	Indianapolis	50	.347	.670	1.4	5.1
Career		50	.347	.670	1.4	5.1
