= Jack Eskridge =

American basketball player (1924–2013)

Personal information
- Born: January 21, 1924 Independence, Missouri, U.S.
- Died: February 11, 2013 (aged 89) Independence, Missouri, U.S.
- Listed height: 6 ft 5 in (1.96 m)
- Listed weight: 200 lb (91 kg)

Career information
- High school: William Chrisman (Independence, Missouri)
- College: Graceland (1941–1943); Kansas (1946–1948)
- BAA draft: 1948: undrafted
- Playing career: 1948–1949
- Position: Center / forward
- Number: 30, 70
- Coaching career: 1954–1959

Career history

Playing
- 1948: Chicago Stags
- 1948–1949: Indianapolis Jets

Coaching
- 1954–1959: Kansas (assistant)
- Stats at NBA.com
- Stats at Basketball Reference

John Wallace Eskridge (January 21, 1924 – February 11, 2013) was an American professional basketball player. He spent one season in the Basketball Association of America (BAA) as a member of the Chicago Stags and the Indianapolis Jets (1948–49). He recruited Hall of Fame basketball player Wilt Chamberlain to the University of Kansas, and designed the "star" logo of the Dallas Cowboys professional football team in the NFL.

== Early years ==
Eskridge was born on January 21, 1924, in Independence, Missouri. He attended William Chrisman High School where he played on the school's basketball team. After graduating high school he began attending Graceland University where he played on the football and basketball teams. He was later inducted into the college's athletic hall of fame. He joined the United States Marine Corps during World War II where he served in the Pacific Theater. During the war he was involved in the battle of Iwo Jima and witnessed both flag raisings.

== University and professional athletics ==
After Eskridge was relieved of duty he started attending the University of Kansas and played on the school's basketball team. Once his professional playing career was over he coached the Atchison High School (Kansas) basketball team to a state championship before he joined the Kansas Jayhawks men's basketball team as their equipment manager and assistant coach under Phog Allen from 1954 to 1959. During his tenure, he recruited Wilt Chamberlain.

In 1959, Eskridge joined the Dallas Cowboys football team as their equipment manager. He was credited with designing the Cowboys' star logo.

== Later years ==
After Eskridge's career with Dallas he moved to Independence, Missouri, where he coached basketball and taught high school for over 20 years. Eskridge died in Independence on February 11, 2013, at the age of 88.

== BAA career statistics ==
Legend
GP	Games played	FG%	Field-goal percentage
FT%	Free-throw percentage	APG	Assists per game
PPG	Points per game	**Bold**	Career high

=== Regular season ===
Year	Team	GP	FG%	FT%	APG	PPG
1948–49	Chicago	3	.000	.000	.0	.0
1948–49	Indianapolis	**20**	**.362**	**.700**	**.7**	**3.2**
Career		23	.362	.700	.6	2.8

== See also ==
- History of the Dallas Cowboys
