= 1948–49 Washington Capitols season =

- Division champions
- Head coach: Red Auerbach
- Owner: Mike Uline
- Arena: Washington Coliseum

Results
- Record: 38–22 (.633)
- Place: Division: 1st (Eastern)
- Playoff finish: BAA Finals (eliminated 2-4 by Lakers)
- Stats at Basketball Reference
- Radio: WTOP

The 1948–49 BAA season was the Capitols' third season in the NBA/BAA. They became the first team to win 15 straight games to start the season, which was both a BAA record and then an NBA record at the time, which would since be tied 45 years later by the Houston Rockets in 1993 before Golden State Warriors surpassed it in 2015. The Cleveland Cavaliers would later tie this mark as well in 2024. After ending their previous season with a surprising tiebreaker exit from playoff contention, the Capitols would return to the kind of greatness they had in their first season of play with a 38–22 resulting in them having the best record in the Eastern Division (though not the best overall record this time around), which led to them making it all the way to the 1949 BAA Finals, where they ended up losing to one of the new entrants of the league, the NBL-turned-BAA's Minneapolis Lakers (who were led primarily by superstar center George Mikan), 4–2. With the Capitols later folding on January 9, 1951, they would end up joining the Chicago Stags in 1947 and last season's champions in the original Baltimore Bullets ABL/BAA/NBA franchise as the only three BAA/NBA teams to have folded operations after making it to a BAA/NBA Finals championship series.

Following the conclusion of the final BAA season before it merged with the National Basketball League (NBL) to become the NBA, legendary head coach Red Auerbach would quit his role as head coach of the Capitols due to team owner Mike Uline refusing to adhere to Auerbach's demands of having a multi-year contract with the team following Uline's prior problems with multi-year contracts with previous teams he had owned in the past, which led to the Capitols replacing Auerbach with player-coach Bob Feerick as the new head coach of the team for the next season. After briefly being an assistant coach for Duke University, he would return to be the head coach for the Tri-Cities Blackhawks for most of the 1949–50 NBA season before later coaching the Boston Celtics for the rest of his tenure, eventually winning nine NBA Finals championships with them.

== Draft ==
Round	Pick	Player	Position	Nationality	College
1	12	Jack Nichols	F/C	United States	Washington
–	–	Fred Bartell	–	United States	Oregon
–	–	Ed Hughes	–	United States	San Jose State
–	–	Thorton Jenkins	–	United States	Missouri
–	–	Leo Katkaveck	G	United States	NC State
–	–	C. T. Parker	–	United States	Louisiana Tech
–	–	Jack Parkinson	G	United States	Kentucky
–	–	Don Walker	–	United States	Sam Houston State
–	–	Al Williams	–	United States	Arkansas

== Roster ==
1948–49 Washington Capitols roster
Players

Pos.	No.	Player	Height	Weight	DOB	From
G/F	10	Bob Feerick	6 ft 3 in (1.91 m)	190 lb (86 kg)	1920-01-02	Santa Clara
F/C	11	Kleggie Hermsen	6 ft 9 in (2.06 m)	225 lb (102 kg)	1923-03-12	Minnesota
G	29	Sonny Hertzberg	5 ft 10 in (1.78 m)	175 lb (79 kg)	1922-07-29	CCNY
G	23	Leo Katkaveck	6 ft 0 in (1.83 m)	185 lb (84 kg)	1923-04-17	NC State
SF	17	Bones McKinney	6 ft 6 in (1.98 m)	185 lb (84 kg)	1919-01-01	North Carolina
PF	15	Jack Nichols	6 ft 7 in (2.01 m)	222 lb (101 kg)	1926-04-09	Washington
F	16	Johnny Norlander	6 ft 3 in (1.91 m)	180 lb (82 kg)	1921-03-05	Hamline
G/F	13	Dick O'Keefe	6 ft 2 in (1.88 m)	185 lb (84 kg)	1923-09-29	Santa Clara
G/F	22	Dick Schulz	6 ft 2 in (1.88 m)	192 lb (87 kg)	1917-01-03	Wisconsin
PG	20	Fred Scolari	5 ft 10 in (1.78 m)	180 lb (82 kg)	1922-03-01	San Francisco
F/C	15	Jack Toomay	6 ft 6 in (1.98 m)	215 lb (98 kg)	1922-08-09	Pacific
G/F	18	Matt Zunic	6 ft 3 in (1.91 m)	195 lb (88 kg)	1919-12-19	George Washington

Coaches
Head coach

Red Auerbach

Legend
- (DP) Unsigned draft pick
- (FA) Free agent
- (S) Suspended
- Injured

Roster

== Regular season ==
=== Season standings ===
#	Eastern Division				
#	Team	W	L	PCT	GB
1	x-Washington Capitols	38	22	.633	–
2	x-New York Knicks	32	28	.533	6
3	x-Baltimore Bullets	29	31	.483	9
4	x-Philadelphia Warriors	28	32	.467	10
5	Boston Celtics	25	35	.417	13
6	Providence Steamrollers	12	48	.200	26

=== Game log ===
1948–49 game log
Total: 38–22
November

Game	Date	Team	Score	High points	Location Attendance	Record
1	November 3	Philadelphia	W 77–70	Hermsen, McKinney (17)		1–0
2	November 4	@ Providence	W 99–95 (3OT)	Bob Feerick (22)		2–0
3	November 6	Minneapolis	W 67–62	Bones McKinney (24)		3–0
4	November 10	Rochester	W 73–66	Fred Scolari (12)		4–0
5	November 11	@ Baltimore	W 70–68	Bones McKinney (15)		5–0
6	November 13	Fort Wayne	W 80–71	Kleggie Hermsen (20)		6–0
7	November 17	@ New York	W 73–62	Hermsen, Hertzberg (12)		7–0
8	November 20	Boston	W 90–75	Kleggie Hermsen (15)		8–0
9	November 21	@ Rochester	W 80–77	Bob Feerick (19)		9–0
10	November 23	@ Boston	W 71–68	Kleggie Hermsen (16)		10–0
11	November 25	@ Philadelphia	W 81–73	Bones McKinney (18)		11–0
12	November 27	Indianapolis	W 94–76	McKinney, Scolari (19)		12–0

December

Game	Date	Team	Score	High points	Location Attendance	Record
13	December 1	Providence	W 75–63	Feerick, McKinney (16)		13–0
14	December 2	@ Providence	W 66–61	Kleggie Hermsen (15)		14–0
15	December 4	Baltimore	W 83–82	Bones McKinney (21)		15–0
16	December 7	@ Indianapolis	L 78–94	Bones McKinney (17)		15–1
17	December 8	@ Minneapolis	W 94–83	Bones McKinney (20)		16–1
18	December 10	vs St. Louis	L 83–88 (OT)	Sidney Hertzberg (21)		16–2
19	December 11	St. Louis	W 87–63	Feerick, Hertzberg (14)		17–2
20	December 15	Philadelphia	W 92–81	Bones McKinney (22)		18–2
21	December 18	Boston	W 69–60	Bones McKinney (21)		19–2
22	December 22	Providence	W 102–77	Bob Feerick (24)		20–2
23	December 25	Fort Wayne	W 88–74	Bob Feerick (20)		21–2
24	December 26	@ Fort Wayne	L 73–91	Kleggie Hermsen (19)		21–3
25	December 29	@ Minneapolis	L 68–91	Bones McKinney (20)		21–4
26	December 30	@ St. Louis	W 81–68	Bob Feerick (20)		22–4

January

Game	Date	Team	Score	High points	Location Attendance	Record
27	January 1	Chicago	W 92–90	Bob Feerick (22)		23–4
28	January 4	@ Philadelphia	W 84–78	Leo Katkaveck (15)		24–4
29	January 5	Baltimore	L 68–88	Hermsen, Norlander, Schulz (10)		24–5
30	January 8	Indianapolis	W 89–81	Fred Scolari (15)		25–5
31	January 10	@ Boston	W 94–83	Fred Scolari (21)		26–5
32	January 12	@ Baltimore	L 92–106	Bob Feerick (17)		26–6
33	January 15	New York	W 75–73	Fred Scolari (17)		27–6
34	January 16	@ Chicago	L 70–92	Jack Nichols (15)		27–7
35	January 20	@ Providence	W 88–81	Bones McKinney (20)		28–7
36	January 22	Boston	W 95–64	Bones McKinney (17)		29–7
37	January 23	@ New York	W 97–93	Bones McKinney (26)		30–7
38	January 26	@ Baltimore	L 86–96	Fred Scolari (18)		30–8
39	January 28	@ Boston	L 90–91	Fred Scolari (17)		30–9
40	January 30	@ Minneapolis	L 79–84	Bob Feerick (19)		30–10

February

Game	Date	Team	Score	High points	Location Attendance	Record
41	February 1	@ Indianapolis	L 69–83	Fred Scolari (20)		30–11
42	February 2	Indianapolis	W 83–57	Kleggie Hermsen (33)		31–11
43	February 3	@ St. Louis	W 74–65	Kleggie Hermsen (27)		32–11
44	February 5	New York	L 73–83	Jack Nichols (15)		32–12
45	February 6	@ Fort Wayne	L 72–82	Bones McKinney (19)		32–13
46	February 9	Rochester	W 99–94 (2OT)	McKinney, Scolari (20)		33–13
47	February 12	Philadelphia	L 88–91	Bob Feerick (17)		33–14
48	February 15	@ Rochester	L 79–91	Jack Nichols (17)		33–15
49	February 19	Baltimore	W 92–88	Jack Nichols (18)		34–15
50	February 23	Providence	W 100–88	Jack Nichols (24)		35–15
51	February 26	Chicago	L 90–103	Feerick, McKinney, Norlander (15)		35–16
52	February 28	@ Chicago	W 67–57	Jack Nichols (13)		36–16

March

Game	Date	Team	Score	High points	Location Attendance	Record
53	March 1	@ Rochester	L 64–67	Jack Nichols (14)		36–17
54	March 2	St. Louis	L 75–82	Fred Scolari (14)		36–18
55	March 5	Chicago	L 95–106	Bob Feerick (21)		36–19
56	March 9	@ New York	L 74–90	Jack Nichols (25)		36–20
57	March 12	Fort Wayne	W 87–60	Jack Nichols (29)		37–20
58	March 16	Minneapolis	W 85–72	Jack Nichols (17)		38–20
59	March 17	@ Philadelphia	L 81–84	Kleggie Hermsen (26)		38–21
60	March 19	New York	L 70–82	Bones McKinney (18)		38–22

== BAA Playoffs ==
=== BAA Eastern Division Semifinals ===
(1) Washington Capitols vs. (4) Philadelphia Warriors: Capitols win series 2-0

- Game 1 @ Washington: Washington 92, Philadelphia 70
- Game 2 @ Philadelphia: Washington 80, Philadelphia 78

Last Playoff Meeting: This is the first and only meeting between the Capitols and Warriors.

=== BAA Eastern Division Finals ===
(1) Washington Capitols vs. (2) New York Knicks: Capitols win series 2-1

- Game 1 @ Washington: Washington 77, New York 71
- Game 2 @ New York: New York 86, Washington 84 (OT)
- Game 3 @ Washington: Washington 84, New York 76

Last Playoff Meeting: This is the first meeting between the Capitols and Knicks.

=== BAA Finals ===
(E1) Washington Capitols vs. (W2) Minneapolis Lakers: Lakers win series 4-2

- Game 1 @ Minneapolis: Minneapolis 88, Washington 84
- Game 2 @ Minneapolis: Minneapolis 76, Washington 62
- Game 3 @ Washington: Minneapolis 94, Washington 74
- Game 4 @ Washington: Washington 83, Minneapolis 71
- Game 5 @ Washington: Washington 74, Minneapolis 65
- Game 6 @ Minneapolis: Minneapolis 77, Washington 56

Last Playoff Meeting: This is the first and only meeting between the Capitols and Lakers.

== Awards and records ==
- Bob Feerick, All-NBA Second Team
- Bones McKinney, All-NBA Second Team
