= 1949–50 Rochester Royals season =

NBA professional basketball team season

- Head coach: Lester Harrison
- Arena: Edgerton Park Arena

Results
- Record: 51–17 (.750)
- Place: Division: 2nd (Central)
- Playoff finish: Central Division Semifinals (lost to Pistons 0–2)
- Stats at Basketball Reference
- Radio: WHAM

The 1949–50 Rochester Royals season was the second season for the Rochester Royals in the National Basketball Association (NBA). The Royals closed out the season on a 15-game winning streak, their longest in franchise history. The team qualified for the 1950 NBA playoffs but were swept by the Fort Wayne Pistons in the Central Division Semifinals.

== BAA/NBA Draft ==
Round	Pick	Player	Position	Nationality	School/Club team
1	10	Frank Saul	F/G	United States	Seton Hall
2	–	Jack Coleman	F/C	United States	Louisville

== Roster ==
1949–50 Rochester Royals roster
Players

Pos.	No.	Player	Height	Weight	DOB	From
G/F	17	Price Brookfield	6 ft 4 in (1.93 m)	185 lb (84 kg)		West Texas A&M
G/F	19	Bill Calhoun	6 ft 3 in (1.91 m)	180 lb (82 kg)		CCSF
F/C	10	Jack Coleman	6 ft 7 in (2.01 m)	195 lb (88 kg)		Louisville
G	15	Fran Curran	6 ft 0 in (1.83 m)	175 lb (79 kg)		Notre Dame
G/F	11	Bob Davies	6 ft 1 in (1.85 m)	175 lb (79 kg)		Seton Hall
F/C	20	Andy Duncan	6 ft 6 in (1.98 m)	195 lb (88 kg)		William & Mary
G	16	Red Holzman	5 ft 10 in (1.78 m)	175 lb (79 kg)		CCNY
F/C	12	Arnie Johnson	6 ft 5 in (1.96 m)	236 lb (107 kg)		Bemidji State
F/C	18	Ed Mikan	6 ft 8 in (2.03 m)	230 lb (104 kg)		DePaul
F/C	18	Mike Novak	6 ft 9 in (2.06 m)	219 lb (99 kg)		Loyola Chicago
F/C	14	Arnie Risen	6 ft 9 in (2.06 m)	200 lb (91 kg)		Ohio State
G/F	3	Frank Saul	6 ft 2 in (1.88 m)	185 lb (84 kg)		Seton Hall
G	9	Bobby Wanzer	6 ft 0 in (1.83 m)	170 lb (77 kg)		Seton Hall

Coaches
Head coach
- Lester Harrison

Legend
- (DP) Unsigned draft pick
- (FA) Free agent
- (S) Suspended
- Injured

== Regular season ==
=== Season standings ===
Central Division	W	L	PCT	GB	Home	Road	Neutral	Div
x-Minneapolis Lakers	51	17	.750	–	30–1	18–16	3–0	16–8
x-Rochester Royals	51	17	.750	–	33–1	17–16	1–0	15–9
x-Fort Wayne Pistons	40	28	.588	11	28–6	12–22	–	14–10
x-Chicago Stags	40	28	.588	11	18–6	14–21	8–1	11–13
St. Louis Bombers	26	42	.382	25	17–14	7–26	2–2	4–20

=== Game log ===
1949–50 Game log
#	Date	Opponent	Score	High points	Record
1	November 1	Sheboygan	108–75	Frank Saul (18)	1–0
2	November 5	Philadelphia	83–53	Arnie Risen (18)	2–0
3	November 9	at Chicago	72–75 (OT)	Bob Davies (18)	2–1
4	November 10	at Sheboygan	87–97	Red Holzman (15)	2–2
5	November 12	New York	94–73	Arnie Risen (21)	3–2
6	November 15	Tri-Cities	93–81	Arnie Risen (17)	4–2
7	November 19	Denver	96–64	Curran, Risen, Wanzer (14)	5–2
8	November 20	at St. Louis	74–95	Bob Davies (18)	5–3
9	November 22	at Indianapolis	74–80	Bill Calhoun (18)	5–4
10	November 23	at Waterloo	90–71	Bob Davies (18)	6–4
11	November 26	Waterloo	120–95	Bob Davies (26)	7–4
12	November 30	at Washington	86–84	Bob Davies (21)	8–4
13	December 1	at Baltimore	64–70	Arnie Risen (17)	8–5
14	December 2	at Philadelphia	82–79	Bill Calhoun (19)	9–5
15	December 3	Indianapolis	99–77	Jack Coleman (17)	10–5
16	December 4	at Minneapolis	80–95	Andy Duncan (15)	10–6
17	December 10	Syracuse	69–63	Arnie Risen (20)	11–6
18	December 13	at Denver	81–65	Bob Davies (16)	12–6
19	December 15	at Fort Wayne	66–69	Bob Davies (24)	12–7
20	December 16	at Chicago	71–80	Arnie Risen (15)	12–8
21	December 17	Chicago	85–63	Arnie Risen (22)	13–8
22	December 20	Minneapolis	87–62	Arnie Johnson (15)	14–8
23	December 25	Boston	88–79	Bob Davies (22)	15–8
24	December 26	at New York	83–80 (OT)	Bob Davies (32)	16–8
25	December 27	Washington	96–72	Davies, Risen (17)	17–8
26	December 29	Fort Wayne	97–79	Bob Davies (21)	18–8
27	December 31	St. Louis	87–68	Bobby Wanzer (19)	19–8
28	January 3	Washington	83–79	Bob Davies (19)	20–8
29	January 4	at Washington	72–63	Bob Davies (15)	21–8
30	January 5	at Baltimore	71–74	Arnie Risen (15)	21–9
31	January 6	at Philadelphia	73–91	Bill Calhoun (12)	21–10
32	January 7	Philadelphia	85–68	Arnie Risen (15)	22–10
33	January 8	at St. Louis	75–73 (2OT)	Bob Davies (18)	23–10
34	January 10	Baltimore	85–67	Arnie Risen (18)	24–10
35	January 14	Minneapolis	83–77	Bobby Wanzer (17)	25–10
36	January 15	at Minneapolis	73–85	Andy Duncan (13)	25–11
37	January 18	at Tri-Cities	70–65	Davies, Wanzer (11)	26–11
38	January 19	at Anderson	81–78	Bob Davies (13)	27–11
39	January 21	Anderson	95–79	Bobby Wanzer (18)	28–11
40	January 22	at New York	71–81	Bobby Wanzer (21)	28–12
41	January 24	Baltimore	70–56	Jack Coleman (16)	29–12
42	January 26	at Syracuse	72–76	Bob Davies (18)	29–13
43	January 28	Boston	82–75	Red Holzman (15)	30–13
44	January 31	at Boston	85–72	Jack Coleman (18)	31–13
45	February 1	at Philadelphia	82–68	Bobby Wanzer (14)	32–13
46	February 2	at Baltimore	69–79	Fran Curran (13)	32–14
47	February 4	Chicago	82–78	Bob Davies (23)	33–14
48	February 5	at New York	73–65	Davies, Johnson (18)	34–14
49	February 7	St. Louis	90–84	Bob Davies (22)	35–14
50	February 11	Fort Wayne	84–92	Bob Davies (29)	35–15
51	February 12	at Fort Wayne	74–76	Bobby Wanzer (11)	35–16
52	February 14	at Chicago	83–74	Bob Davies (23)	36–16
53	February 15	at Minneapolis	70–92	Red Holzman (16)	36–17
54	February 17	at Boston	81–73	Bob Davies (20)	37–17
55	February 18	vs Boston	94–73	Bobby Wanzer (19)	38–17
56	February 19	New York	105–92	Bob Davies (23)	39–17
57	February 21	Washington	84–76	Bob Davies (22)	40–17
58	February 25	Minneapolis	66–64	Calhoun, Holzman (14)	41–17
59	February 26	at St. Louis	81–79	Davies, Johnson (16)	42–17
60	February 28	Chicago	74–69	Bob Davies (21)	43–17
61	March 4	Fort Wayne	73–70	Bob Davies (16)	44–17
62	March 5	at Fort Wayne	65–60	Davies, Wanzer (11)	45–17
63	March 9	Boston	78–59	Arnie Risen (15)	46–17
64	March 11	Philadelphia	90–72	Bobby Wanzer (19)	47–17
65	March 12	St. Louis	99–72	Frank Saul (16)	48–17
66	March 15	at Washington	93–64	Bobby Wanzer (19)	49–17
67	March 18	New York	77–74	Bob Davies (12)	50–17
68	March 19	Baltimore	97–66	Bill Calhoun (17)	51–17

== Playoffs ==
1950 playoff game log
Division Tiebreaker (finished as Central's #2 seed)

Game	Date	Team	Score	High points	High assists	Location	Record
1	March 21	Minneapolis	L 76–78	Bob Davies (26)	Bob Davies (6)	Edgerton Park Arena	0–1

Division Semifinals: 0–2 (home: 0–1; road: 0–1)

Game	Date	Team	Score	High points	Location	Series
1	March 23	Fort Wayne	L 84–90	three players tied (15)	Edgerton Park Arena	0–1
2	March 24	@ Fort Wayne	L 78–79 (OT)	Arnie Risen (17)	North Side High School Gym	0–2

1950 schedule

== Awards and records ==
- Bob Davies, All-NBA First Team
