= Philip Brownstein =

American basketball coach, scout, and general manager

Personal information
- Born: May 17, 1906 Chicago, Illinois
- Died: February 11, 1999 (aged 92) Skokie, Illinois

Career history

Coaching
- 1929–1971: Kelvyn Park HS
- 1949–1950: Chicago Stags

Career highlights
- Sports Lodge B'nai B'rith Hall of Fame (1982); Illinois Coaches' Hall of Fame (1984)

Philip Brownstein (May 17, 1906 – February 11, 1999) was an American basketball coach, scout, and general manager at the prep school and professional levels. He was the interim head coach for the Chicago Stags, an early National Basketball Association team, for 11 games during the 1948–49 season, and went 10–1 while head coach Harold Olsen was out. Brownstein then took over as the Stags' head coach for the 1949–50 season and led them to a 40–28 record.

Brownstein earned his undergraduate degree from the University of Illinois at Urbana–Champaign and his master's from DePaul University. From 1929 to 1971, Brownstein served as a basketball coach and assistant principal at Kelvyn Park High School in his hometown of Chicago, Illinois. He also served as a scout for the Harlem Globetrotters and as a general manager for the Chicago Majors of the American Basketball League.

He died on February 11, 1999, in Rush North Shore Medical Center in Skokie, Illinois.

== Head coaching record ==
Legend
| Regular season | G | Games coached | W | Games won | L | Games lost | W–L % | Win–loss % |
| Playoffs | PG | Playoff games | PW | Playoff wins | PL | Playoff losses | PW–L % | Playoff win–loss % |

| Team | Year | G | W | L | W–L% | Finish | PG | PW | PL | PW–L% | Result |
|---|---|---|---|---|---|---|---|---|---|---|---|
| Chicago | 1948–49 | 11 | 10 | 1 | .909 | (interim) | — | — | — | — | — |
| Chicago | 1949–50 | 68 | 40 | 28 | .588 | 4th in NBA Central | 2 | 0 | 2 | .000 | Lost in Division semifinals |
| Career | | 79 | 50 | 29 | .633 | | 2 | 0 | 2 | .000 | |
