= 1948–49 New York Knicks season =

Season of National Basketball Association team the New York Knicks

- Head coach: Joe Lapchick
- General manager: Ned Irish
- Arena: Madison Square Garden

Results
- Record: 32–28 (.533)
- Place: Division: 2nd Conference: 2nd
- Playoff finish: East Division finals (lost to Capitols 1–2)

Local media
- Television: WOR-TV; WPIX
- Radio: WMGM

The 1948–49 New York Knickerbockers season was the third season for the team in the Basketball Association of America (BAA), which later became the National Basketball Association (NBA). The Knickerbockers had a 32–28 record in 1948–49 and finished second in the Eastern Division, six games behind the Washington Capitols. New York qualified for the playoffs, and defeated the Baltimore Bullets 2–1 in a best-of-three series to earn a place in the Eastern Division finals. In the division championship series, the Knickerbockers lost to the Capitols, two games to one. Before the 1949–50 season, the BAA merged with the National Basketball League to form the NBA.

== Draft ==
Round	Pick	Player	Position	Nationality	School/Club team
1	4	Dolph Schayes	F/C	United States	NYU
–	–	Gene Berce	G/F	United States	Marquette
–	–	Leland Byrd	–	United States	West Virginia
–	–	Harry Gallatin	F/C	United States	Northeast Missouri
–	–	Keith Grimes	–	United States	East Central
–	–	Mel McGaha	G	United States	Arkansas
–	–	Ed Peterson	C	United States	Cornell
–	–	Tex Ritter	G	United States	Eastern Kentucky
–	–	Dick Shrider	G	United States	Ohio
–	–	John Stanich	–	United States	UCLA

== Roster ==
1948–49 New York Knicks roster
Players

Pos.	No.	Player	Height	Weight	DOB	From
G/F	4	Carl Braun	6 ft 5 in (1.96 m)	180 lb (82 kg)	1927-09-25	Colgate
G/F	14	Tommy Byrnes	6 ft 3 in (1.91 m)	175 lb (79 kg)	1923-02-19	Seton Hall
F	18	Joe Colone	6 ft 5 in (1.96 m)	210 lb (95 kg)	1924-01-23	Bloomsburg
F/C	11	Harry Gallatin	6 ft 6 in (1.98 m)	210 lb (95 kg)	1918-11-22	Truman State
F	14	Gene James	6 ft 4 in (1.93 m)	180 lb (82 kg)	1925-02-15	Marshall
C	19	Lee Knorek	6 ft 7 in (2.01 m)	215 lb (98 kg)	1921-07-15	Detroit Mercy
F	12	Ray Kuka	6 ft 3 in (1.91 m)	200 lb (91 kg)	1922-02-17	Notre Dame
G	7	Ray Lumpp	6 ft 1 in (1.85 m)	178 lb (81 kg)	1923-07-11	NYU
G	8	Mel McGaha	6 ft 1 in (1.85 m)	190 lb (86 kg)	1926-09-26	Arkansas
F	5	Paul Noel	6 ft 4 in (1.93 m)	185 lb (84 kg)	1924-08-17	Kentucky
F/C	16	Bud Palmer	6 ft 4 in (1.93 m)	180 lb (82 kg)	1921-09-14	Princeton
G/F	10	Tex Ritter	6 ft 2 in (1.88 m)	185 lb (84 kg)	1924-02-26	Eastern Kentucky
C	3	Irv Rothenberg	6 ft 7 in (2.01 m)	215 lb (98 kg)	1921-12-31	LIU Brooklyn
G	7	Dick Shrider	6 ft 2 in (1.88 m)	190 lb (86 kg)	1923-02-07	Ohio
G	6	Sid Tanenbaum	6 ft 0 in (1.83 m)	160 lb (73 kg)	1925-10-08	NYU
G/F	17	Butch van Breda Kolff	6 ft 3 in (1.91 m)	185 lb (84 kg)	1922-10-28	NYU

Coaches
Head coach

Joe Lapchick

Legend
- (DP) Unsigned draft pick
- (FA) Free agent
- (S) Suspended
- Injured

Roster

== Regular season ==
=== Season standings ===
#	Eastern Division				
#	Team	W	L	PCT	GB
1	x-Washington Capitols	38	22	.633	–
2	x-New York Knicks	32	28	.533	6
3	x-Baltimore Bullets	29	31	.483	9
4	x-Philadelphia Warriors	28	32	.467	10
5	Boston Celtics	25	35	.417	13
6	Providence Steamrollers	12	48	.200	26

=== Game log ===
#	Date	Opponent	Score	High points	Record
1	November 3	@ Fort Wayne	80–76	Irv Rothenberg (19)	1–0
2	November 5	@ Indianapolis	87–71	Butch van Breda Kolff (17)	2–0
3	November 9	@ St. Louis	56–60	Carl Braun (18)	2–1
4	November 11	Minneapolis	68–77	Bud Palmer (21)	2–2
5	November 13	Baltimore	91–87	Butch van Breda Kolff (17)	3–2
6	November 16	@ Rochester	63–75	Bud Palmer (14)	3–3
7	November 17	Washington	62–73	Carl Braun (11)	3–4
8	November 18	@ Baltimore	67–55	Carl Braun (15)	4–4
9	November 20	Philadelphia	91–86	Bud Palmer (28)	5–4
10	November 27	Fort Wayne	80–70	Bud Palmer (16)	6–4
11	November 30	@ Providence	88–61	Bud Palmer (16)	7–4
12	December 1	Rochester	72–73	Carl Braun (22)	7–5
13	December 4	Indianapolis	66–63	Carl Braun (26)	8–5
14	December 8	Providence	83–74 (OT)	Irv Rothenberg (17)	9–5
15	December 9	@ Providence	74–63	Tommy Byrnes (19)	10–5
16	December 11	Baltimore	72–71	Carl Braun (22)	11–5
17	December 12	@ Fort Wayne	89–78	Carl Braun (21)	12–5
18	December 13	@ Indianapolis	80–74	Carl Braun (14)	13–5
19	December 17	@ Philadelphia	78–87	Carl Braun (19)	13–6
20	December 18	St. Louis	88–79	Carl Braun (26)	14–6
21	December 19	@ Boston	75–77	Bud Palmer (24)	14–7
22	December 22	Minneapolis	97–79	Paul Noel (21)	15–7
23	December 25	Chicago	64–70	Bud Palmer (16)	15–8
24	December 29	Rochester	77–74	Sid Tanenbaum (17)	16–8
25	January 1	Philadelphia	88–80	Butch van Breda Kolff (16)	17–8
26	January 2	@ Chicago	79–81	Braun, Knorek (15)	17–9
27	January 4	@ Indianapolis	58–63	Sid Tanenbaum (18)	17–10
28	January 7	@ Boston	69–67	Harry Gallatin (21)	18–10
29	January 8	Baltimore	81–83	Harry Gallatin (16)	18–11
30	January 12	Boston	81–64	Bud Palmer (18)	19–11
31	January 15	@ Washington	73–75	Irv Rothenberg (16)	19–12
32	January 17	St. Louis	71–79	Sid Tanenbaum (16)	19–13
33	January 20	@ Baltimore	68–82	Braun, Palmer (11)	19–14
34	January 22	@ Rochester	98–103 (2OT)	Palmer, Ritter (18)	19–15
35	January 23	Washington	93–97	Braun, Palmer (23)	19–16
36	January 26	Providence	89–77	Bud Palmer (19)	20–16
37	January 27	@ Philadelphia	96–102	Carl Braun (28)	20–17
38	January 29	Philadelphia	73–78	Carl Braun (14)	20–18
39	February 5	@ Washington	83–73	Lumpp, Palmer (19)	21–18
40	February 6	Chicago	75–87	Ray Lumpp (23)	21–19
41	February 9	@ St. Louis	95–83	Carl Braun (22)	22–19
42	February 10	@ Minneapolis	75–95	Bud Palmer (14)	22–20
43	February 12	Fort Wayne	85–58	Ray Lumpp (23)	23–20
44	February 13	@ Fort Wayne	73–82	Bud Palmer (15)	23–21
45	February 15	vs St. Louis	79–75 (OT)	Butch van Breda Kolff (22)	24–21
46	February 17	@ Philadelphia	82–86	Ray Lumpp (22)	24–22
47	February 19	Boston	77–87	Ray Lumpp (20)	24–23
48	February 22	Minneapolis	74–101	Joe Colone (21)	24–24
49	February 24	@ Providence	84–89	Bud Palmer (22)	24–25
50	February 26	Indianapolis	81–76	Bud Palmer (20)	25–25
51	March 2	Chicago	81–79	Ray Lumpp (21)	26–25
52	March 3	Providence	86–65	Ray Lumpp (20)	27–25
53	March 5	Boston	66–61	Carl Braun (14)	28–25
54	March 9	Washington	90–74	Bud Palmer (19)	29–25
55	March 10	@ Baltimore	99–94	Carl Braun (26)	30–25
56	March 12	@ Chicago	85–80	Carl Braun (24)	31–25
57	March 13	@ Minneapolis	90–100	Carl Braun (20)	31–26
58	March 16	Rochester	89–94	Harry Gallatin (17)	31–27
59	March 18	@ Boston	56–70	Gene James (11)	31–28
60	March 19	@ Washington	82–70	Ray Lumpp (23)	32–28

== Playoffs ==
1949 playoff game log
Division semifinals: 2–1 (home: 2–0; road: 0–1)

Game	Date	Team	Score	High points	Location	Series
1	March 23	@ Baltimore	L 81–82	Carl Braun (21)	Baltimore Coliseum	0–1
2	March 24	Baltimore	W 84–74	Carl Braun (20)	Madison Square Garden III	1–1
3	March 26	Baltimore	W 103–99 (OT)	Harry Gallatin (21)	Madison Square Garden III	2–1

Division finals: 1–2 (home: 1–0; road: 0–2)

Game	Date	Team	Score	High points	Location	Series
1	March 29	@ Washington	L 71–77	Harry Gallatin (17)	National Guard Armory	0–1
2	March 31	Washington	W 86–84 (OT)	Carl Braun (30)	Madison Square Garden III	1–1
3	April 2	@ Washington	L 76–84	Braun, Gallatin (15)	National Guard Armory	1–2

1949 schedule
