= 1949 BAA playoffs =

Postseason tournament

Tournament details
- Dates: March 22 – April 13, 1949
- Season: 1948–49
- Teams: 8

Final positions
- Champions: Minneapolis Lakers (1st title)
- Runners-up: Washington Capitols
- Semifinalists: Rochester Royals; New York Knicks

The 1949 BAA playoffs was the postseason tournament following the Basketball Association of America 1948–49 season, its third and last. Later that year the BAA and National Basketball League merged to create the National Basketball Association or NBA. The tournament concluded with the Western Division champion Minneapolis Lakers defeating the Eastern Division champion Washington Capitols 4 games to 2 in the BAA Finals.

The eight qualified teams began tournament play on Tuesday and Wednesday, March 22 and 23, and the Finals concluded on Wednesday, April 13. Minneapolis and Washington played 10 and 11 games in a span of 22 days; their six final games in ten days. Prior to their final series, however, Minneapolis had been idle for five days, Washington for only one day.

This season would also be the final season where the BAA's playoffs would be in direct competition with the rivaling NBL's playoffs, with the 1949 NBL playoffs occurring from April 1–19, 1949, with the NBL being late against the BAA this time around. The final BAA playoffs would see the NBL-born Minneapolis Lakers take on the final championship from the BAA's name, meaning the BAA's championships would be earned by a team from three different professional basketball leagues upon their births (the Philadelphia Warriors with the inaugural BAA championship representing the BAA properly, the Baltimore Bullets getting the 1948 championship while previously being from the American Basketball League, and the Minneapolis Lakers acquiring the 1949 BAA championship while previously being from the rivaling National Basketball League).

== Playoff seeds ==
=== Eastern Division ===
1. Washington Capitols
2. New York Knicks
3. Baltimore Bullets
4. Philadelphia Warriors

=== Western Division ===
1. Rochester Royals
2. Minneapolis Lakers
3. Chicago Stags
4. St. Louis Bombers

== Playoff bracket ==
Division Semifinals
E1	Washington*	2
E4	Philadelphia	0
Eastern Division
E2	New York	2
E3	Baltimore	1
W1	Rochester*	2
W4	St. Louis	0
Western Division
W2	Minneapolis	2
W3	Chicago	0

Division Finals
E1	Washington*	2
E2	New York	1
W1	Rochester*	0
W2	Minneapolis	2

BAA Finals
E1	Washington*	2
W2	Minneapolis	4

- * Division winner
- Bold Series winner

== Division Semifinals ==
=== Eastern Division Semifinals ===
==== (1) Washington Capitols vs. (4) Philadelphia Warriors ====
March 23

Boxscore

Washington Capitols 92, Philadelphia Warriors 70
Scoring by quarter: 15–17, 25–17, 24–13, 28–23
Pts: Kleggie Hermsen 20; Asts: Sonny Hertzberg 3	Pts: Jake Bornheimer 13; Asts: Howie Dallmar 3
Washington leads series, 1–0

Philadelphia Arena, Philadelphia, Pennsylvania

March 24

Boxscore

Philadelphia Warriors 78, Washington Capitols 80
Scoring by quarter: 20–22, 13–17, 16–20, 29–21
Pts: Chink Crossin 22; Asts: Jerry Fleishman 3	Pts: Bones McKinney 19; Asts: Jack Nichols 5
Washington wins series, 2–0

Uline Arena, Washington, D.C.

This was the first playoff meeting between these two teams.

==== (2) New York Knicks vs. (3) Baltimore Bullets ====
March 23

Boxscore

New York Knicks 81, Baltimore Bullets 82
Scoring by half: 39–36, 42–46
Pts: Carl Braun 21	Pts: Jake Pelkington 21
Baltimore leads series, 1–0

Baltimore Coliseum, Baltimore, Maryland

March 24

Boxscore

Baltimore Bullets 74, New York Knicks 84
Scoring by half: 35–39, 39–45
Pts: Jake Pelkington 14	Pts: Carl Braun 20
Series tied, 1–1

Madison Square Garden III, Manhattan, New York

March 26

Boxscore

Baltimore Bullets 99, New York Knicks 103 (OT)
Scoring by quarter: 26–25, 25–26, 16–17, 22–21, Overtime: 10–14
Pts: Connie Simmons 22	Pts: Harry Gallatin 21
New York wins series, 2–1

Madison Square Garden III, Manhattan, New York

This was the second playoff meeting between these two teams, with the Bullets winning the first meeting.

Previous playoff series
Baltimore leads 1–0 in all-time playoff series

1948

Baltimore Bullets 2, New York Knicks 1

1948 BAA First Round

=== Western Division Semifinals ===
==== (1) Rochester Royals vs. (4) St. Louis Bombers ====
March 22

Boxscore

St. Louis Bombers 64, Rochester Royals 93
Scoring by half: 27–50, 37–43
Pts: Bill Roberts 16	Pts: Bob Davies 23
Rochester leads series, 1–0

Edgerton Park Arena, Rochester, New York

March 23

Boxscore

Rochester Royals 66, St. Louis Bombers 64
Scoring by half: 29–26, 37–38
Pts: Bobby Wanzer 17	Pts: Red Rocha 27
Rochester wins series, 2–0

St. Louis Arena, St. Louis, Missouri

This was the first playoff meeting between these two teams.

==== (2) Minneapolis Lakers vs. (3) Chicago Stags ====
March 23

Boxscore

Chicago Stags 77, Minneapolis Lakers 84
Scoring by half: 35–33, 42–51
Pts: Max Zaslofsky 22	Pts: George Mikan 37
Minneapolis leads series, 1–0

Minneapolis Auditorium, Minneapolis, Minnesota

March 24

Boxscore

Minneapolis Lakers 101, Chicago Stags 85
Scoring by half: 56–42, 45–43
Pts: George Mikan 38	Pts: Max Zaslofsky 22
Minneapolis wins series, 2–0

Chicago Stadium, Chicago, Illinois

This was the first playoff meeting between these two teams.

== Division Finals ==
=== Eastern Division Finals ===
==== (1) Washington Capitols vs. (2) New York Knicks ====
March 29

Boxscore

New York Knicks 71, Washington Capitols 77
Scoring by quarter: 17–21, 18–17, 17–18, 19–21
Pts: Harry Gallatin 17	Pts: Johnny Norlander 16
Washington leads series, 1–0

National Guard Armory, Washington, D.C.

March 31

Boxscore

Washington Capitols 84, New York Knicks 86 (OT)
Pts: Jack Nichols 25	Pts: Carl Braun 30
Series tied, 1–1

Madison Square Garden III, Manhattan, New York

April 2

Boxscore

New York Knicks 76, Washington Capitols 84
Scoring by quarter: 15–24, 23–24, 17–12, 21–24
Pts: Braun, Gallatin 15 each	Pts: Sonny Hertzberg 24
Washington wins series, 2–1

National Guard Armory, Washington, D.C.

This was the first playoff meeting between these two teams.

=== Western Division Finals ===
==== (1) Rochester Royals vs. (2) Minneapolis Lakers ====
March 27

Boxscore

Minneapolis Lakers 80, Rochester Royals 79
Scoring by half: 46–34, 34–45
Pts: George Mikan 32	Pts: Arnie Risen 17
Minneapolis leads series, 1–0

Edgerton Park Arena, Rochester, New York

March 29

Boxscore

Rochester Royals 55, Minneapolis Lakers 67
Scoring by half: 32–34, 23–34
Pts: Arnie Risen 21	Pts: George Mikan 31
Minneapolis wins series, 2–0

St. Paul Auditorium, Saint Paul, Minnesota

This was the first playoff meeting between these two teams.

== BAA Finals: (W2) Minneapolis Lakers vs. (E1) Washington Capitols ==
April 4

Boxscore

Washington Capitols 84, Minneapolis Lakers 88
Scoring by quarter: 13–23, 27–25, 21–19, 23–21
Pts: Fred Scolari 20	Pts: George Mikan 42
Minneapolis leads series, 1–0

Minneapolis Auditorium, Minneapolis, Minnesota
Attendance: 8,210

April 6

Boxscore

Washington Capitols 62, Minneapolis Lakers 76
Scoring by quarter: 13–20, 19–27, 13–11, 17–18
Pts: Sonny Hertzberg 13	Pts: Don Carlson 16
Minneapolis leads series, 2–0

Minneapolis Auditorium, Minneapolis, Minnesota
Attendance: 10,212
Referees: Pat Kennedy, Phil Fox

April 8

Boxscore

Minneapolis Lakers 94, Washington Capitols 74
Scoring by quarter: 26–14, 17–15, 28–24, 23–21
Pts: George Mikan 35	Pts: Nichols, Zunic 12 each
Minneapolis leads series, 3–0

Uline Arena, Washington, D.C.
Attendance: 4,919

April 9

Boxscore

Minneapolis Lakers 71, Washington Capitols 83
Scoring by quarter: 23–22, 12–23, 16–20, 20–18
Pts: George Mikan 27	Pts: Jack Nichols 27
Minneapolis leads series, 3–1

Uline Arena, Washington, D.C.
Attendance: 4,471

April 11

Boxscore

Minneapolis Lakers 65, Washington Capitols 74
Scoring by quarter: 12–22, 18–19, 22–15, 13–18
Pts: George Mikan 22	Pts: Hermsen, Nichols 13 each
Minneapolis leads series, 3–2

Uline Arena, Washington, D.C.
Attendance: 3,840

April 13

Boxscore

Washington Capitols 56, Minneapolis Lakers 77
Scoring by quarter: 12–19, 12–21, 17–22, 15–15
Pts: Kleggie Hermsen 12	Pts: George Mikan 29
Minneapolis wins series, 4–2

St. Paul Auditorium, Saint Paul, Minnesota
Attendance: 10,482

This was the first playoff meeting between these two teams.

== See also ==
- NBA records
