= 1948–49 BAA season =

Third NBA season

- League: Basketball Association of America
- Sport: Basketball
- Duration: November 1, 1948 – March 20, 1949; March 22 – April 2, 1949 (Playoffs); April 4–13, 1949 (Finals)
- Games: 60
- Teams: 12

Draft
- Top draft pick: Andy Tonkovich
- Picked by: Providence Steamrollers

Regular season
- Top seed: Rochester Royals
- Top scorer: George Mikan (Minneapolis)

Playoffs
- Eastern champions: Washington Capitols
- Eastern runners-up: New York Knicks
- Western champions: Minneapolis Lakers
- Western runners-up: Rochester Royals

Finals
- Champions: Minneapolis Lakers
- Runners-up: Washington Capitols

BAA/NBA seasons
- ← 1947–48 1949–50 →

The 1948–49 BAA season was the third and final season of the Basketball Association of America. The 1949 BAA Playoffs ended with the Minneapolis Lakers winning the BAA championship, beating the Washington Capitols in six games in the BAA Finals.

The NBA recognizes the three BAA seasons as part of its own history so the 1948–49 BAA season is considered the third NBA season. Following the season, the BAA and National Basketball League merged to create the National Basketball Association or NBA.

== Notable occurrences ==
- Four National Basketball League teams (Fort Wayne, Indianapolis, Minneapolis and Rochester) joined the BAA for the 1948–49 season. As a result of these new teams being added from the rivaling NBL into the newer BAA, the Eastern Division would see the new defending BAA champion Baltimore Bullets alongside the Washington Capitols either joining or returning to that division, while the four former NBL teams would join the Chicago Stags and the St. Louis Bombers as the four other teams to enter the recreated Western Division for this season.
- The BAA/NBA would have their first ever game with two teams scoring over 100 points against each other in the same match, with the Indianapolis Jets scoring 110 points and the Providence Steamrollers scoring 107 points on November 20, 1948 in Providence, Rhode Island for an Indianapolis Jets victory.

Coaching changes
Off-season
Team	1947–48 coach	1948–49 coach
Boston Celtics	Honey Russell	Doggie Julian
Providence Steamrollers	Nat Hickey	Ken Loeffler
St. Louis Bombers	Ken Loeffler	Grady Lewis
In-season
Team	Outgoing coach	Incoming coach
Chicago Stags	Harold Olsen	Philip Brownstein
Fort Wayne Pistons	Carl Bennett	Curly Armstrong
Indianapolis Jets	Bruce Hale	Burl Friddle

== Final standings ==
#	Eastern Division				
#	Team	W	L	PCT	GB
1	x-Washington Capitols	38	22	.633	–
2	x-New York Knicks	32	28	.533	6
3	x-Baltimore Bullets	29	31	.483	9
4	x-Philadelphia Warriors	28	32	.467	10
5	Boston Celtics	25	35	.417	13
6	Providence Steamrollers	12	48	.200	26

#	Western Division				
#	Team	W	L	PCT	GB
1	x-Rochester Royals	45	15	.750	–
2	x-Minneapolis Lakers	44	16	.733	1
3	x-Chicago Stags	38	22	.633	7
4	x-St. Louis Bombers	29	31	.483	16
5	Fort Wayne Pistons	22	38	.367	23
6	Indianapolis Jets	18	42	.300	27

== Playoffs ==
Division Semifinals
E1	Washington*	2
E4	Philadelphia	0
Eastern Division
E2	New York	2
E3	Baltimore	1
W1	Rochester*	2
W4	St. Louis	0
Western Division
W2	Minneapolis	2
W3	Chicago	0

Division Finals
E1	Washington*	2
E2	New York	1
W1	Rochester*	0
W2	Minneapolis	2

BAA Finals
E1	Washington*	2
W2	Minneapolis	4

- * Division winner
- Bold Series winner

== Statistics leaders ==
Category	Player	Team	Stat
Points	George Mikan	Minneapolis Lakers	1,698
Assists	Bob Davies	Rochester Royals	321
FG%	Arnie Risen	Rochester Royals	.423
FT%	Bob Feerick	Washington Capitols	.859

Note: Prior to the 1969–70 season, league leaders in points and assists were determined by totals rather than averages.

== BAA awards ==
- All-BAA First Team:
  - G Max Zaslofsky, Chicago Stags
  - G/F Bob Davies, Rochester Royals
  - C George Mikan, Minneapolis Lakers
  - F Jim Pollard, Minneapolis Lakers
  - F Joe Fulks, Philadelphia Warriors
- All-BAA Second Team
  - C Arnie Risen, Rochester Royals
  - C Bob Feerick, Washington Capitols
  - F/C Bones McKinney, Washington Capitols
  - G Ken Sailors, Providence Steamrollers
  - G John Logan, St. Louis Bombers
- BAA Rookie of the Year
  - G/F Howie Shannon, Providence Steamrollers

== See also ==
- List of NBA regular season records
- 1948–49 NBL season, the corresponding season of the NBL just prior to its merger with the BAA.
