= 1951 NBA Finals =

1951 basketball championship series

Team	Coach	Wins
Rochester Royals	Les Harrison	4
New York Knickerbockers	Joe Lapchick	3
- Dates: April 7–21
- Hall of Famers: Royals: Bob Davies (1970); Red Holzman (1986, coach); Bobby Wanzer (1987); Arnie Risen (1998); Knickerbockers: Harry Gallatin (1991); Dick McGuire (1993); Nat Clifton (2014); Coaches: Joe Lapchick (1966, player); Les Harrison (1980, contributor); Officials: Pat Kennedy (1959)
- Eastern finals: Knickerbockers defeated Nationals, 3–2
- Western finals: Royals defeated Lakers, 3–1

The 1951 NBA World Championship Series was the championship round of the 1951 NBA playoffs, which concluded the National Basketball Association 1950–51 season. It featured an all-New York matchup Western Division champion Rochester Royals faced the Eastern Division champion New York Knickerbockers in a best-of-seven series with Rochester having home-court advantage. This was the only time the NBA Finals ever featured two teams from the same state.

Rochester won the first three games, two at home, but New York won the next three, two at home. It was the first BAA or NBA Finals (spanning 1947 to 1951) (Note: The Basketball Association of America (BAA) played three seasons, 1946–47 to 1948–49, all with postseason tournaments that concluded in best-of-seven series. The NBA recognizes BAA history as part of its own, sometimes without comment. The NBA was actually created by 1949 merger of the BAA and its older competitor, the National Basketball League. There were 12 NBL championships, all finally decided by a best-of-three or best-of-five series.) that extended to a seventh-game conclusion, a 4-point win by Rochester at home on Saturday, April 21.

The seven games were played in fifteen days, beginning Saturday and Sunday, April 7 and 8, in Rochester and incorporating one game in Rochester on each following weekend. Three Wednesday or Friday games were played in New York City. The entire postseason tournament spanned 33 days in which both Rochester and New York played 14 games.

The Royals appeared in their first NBA finals by defeating the Fort Wayne Pistons in the semifinals and the two-time defending champion Minneapolis Lakers in the division finals while the Knickerbockers defeated the Boston Celtics in the semifinals and the Syracuse Nationals in the division finals. This was the first finals appearance for both teams, and the first Finals with two teams that had not made a finals appearance since the 1947 BAA Finals.

As of 2026, this is the only NBA Finals won by the Royals franchise, now known as the Sacramento Kings, who currently hold the longest NBA title drought.

== Team rosters ==
=== Rochester Royals ===
1950–51 Rochester Royals roster
Players

Pos.	No.	Player	Height	Weight	DOB	From
SG	19	Bill Calhoun	6 ft 3 in (1.91 m)	180 lb (82 kg)	1927-11-04	CCSF
PF	10	Jack Coleman	6 ft 7 in (2.01 m)	195 lb (88 kg)	1924-05-23	Louisville
PG	11	Bob Davies	6 ft 1 in (1.85 m)	175 lb (79 kg)	1920-01-15	Seton Hall
PG	16	Red Holzman	5 ft 10 in (1.78 m)	175 lb (79 kg)	1920-08-10	CCNY
SF	12	Arnie Johnson	6 ft 5 in (1.96 m)	236 lb (107 kg)	1920-05-16	Bemidji State
SF	20	Joe McNamee	6 ft 6 in (1.98 m)	210 lb (95 kg)	1926-09-24	San Francisco
C	18	Ed Mikan	6 ft 8 in (2.03 m)	230 lb (104 kg)	1925-10-20	DePaul
F	07, 15	Paul Noel	6 ft 4 in (1.93 m)	185 lb (84 kg)	1924-08-17	Kentucky
C	14	Arnie Risen	6 ft 9 in (2.06 m)	200 lb (91 kg)		Ohio State
SG	3	Pep Saul	6 ft 2 in (1.88 m)	185 lb (84 kg)		Seton Hall
G	9	Bobby Wanzer	6 ft 0 in (1.83 m)	170 lb (77 kg)	1921-06-04	Seton Hall

Coaches
Head coach
- Les Harrison

Legend
- (DP) Unsigned draft pick
- (FA) Free agent
- (S) Suspended
- Injured

Roster

=== New York Knickerbockers ===
1950–51 New York Knicks roster
Players

Pos.	No.	Player	Height	Weight	DOB	From
SF	12	Vince Boryla	6 ft 5 in (1.96 m)	210 lb (95 kg)		Denver
PF	19	Nathaniel Clifton	6 ft 6 in (1.98 m)	220 lb (100 kg)		Xavier (LA)
C		Ray Ellefson	6 ft 8 in (2.03 m)	230 lb (104 kg)		West Texas A&M
F/C	11	Harry Gallatin	6 ft 6 in (1.98 m)	210 lb (95 kg)		Truman State
F	14	Gene James	6 ft 4 in (1.93 m)	180 lb (82 kg)		Marshall
SF	17	George Kaftan	6 ft 3 in (1.91 m)	190 lb (86 kg)		Holy Cross
F	6, 16	Tony Lavelli	6 ft 3 in (1.91 m)	185 lb (84 kg)		Yale
G	7	Ray Lumpp	6 ft 1 in (1.85 m)	178 lb (81 kg)		NYU
PG	15	Dick McGuire	6 ft 0 in (1.83 m)	180 lb (82 kg)		St. John's
G/F	10	Tex Ritter	6 ft 2 in (1.88 m)	185 lb (84 kg)		Eastern Kentucky
F/C	18	Connie Simmons	6 ft 8 in (2.03 m)	222 lb (101 kg)
G/F	9	Ernie Vandeweghe	6 ft 3 in (1.91 m)	195 lb (88 kg)		Colgate
SG	5	Max Zaslofsky	6 ft 2 in (1.88 m)	170 lb (77 kg)		St. John's

Coaches
Head coach
- Joe Lapchick

Legend
- (DP) Unsigned draft pick
- (FA) Free agent
- (S) Suspended
- Injured

Roster

== Series summary ==
Game	Date	Home team	Result	Road team
Game 1	April 7	Rochester Royals	92–65 (1–0)	New York Knickerbockers
Game 2	April 8	Rochester Royals	99–84 (2–0)	New York Knickerbockers
Game 3	April 11	New York Knickerbockers	71–78 (0–3)	Rochester Royals
Game 4	April 13	New York Knickerbockers	79–73 (1–3)	Rochester Royals
Game 5	April 15	Rochester Royals	89–92 (3–2)	New York Knickerbockers
Game 6	April 18	New York Knickerbockers	80–73 (3–3)	Rochester Royals
Game 7	April 21	Rochester Royals	79–75 (4–3)	New York Knickerbockers

Royals win series 4–3

The Rochester / Cincinnati Royals / Kansas City / Sacramento Kings won their first ever NBA Championship.

== Box scores ==
April 7

Boxscore

New York Knickerbockers 65, Rochester Royals 92
Scoring by quarter: 18–24, 16–27, 16–21, 15–20
Pts: Vince Boryla 13; Rebs: Simmons, Clifton 10 each Asts: Ernie Vandeweghe 4	Pts: Arnie Risen 24; Rebs: Arnie Risen 15; Asts: Bobby Wanzer 9
Rochester leads series, 1–0

Edgerton Park Arena, Rochester, New York
Attendance: 4,200

April 8

Boxscore

New York Knickerbockers 84, Rochester Royals 99
Scoring by quarter: 17–26, 21–21, 28–26, 18–26
Pts: Max Zaslofsky 28; Rebs: Harry Gallatin 17; Asts: Vince Boryla 7	Pts: Bob Davies 24; Rebs: Jack Coleman 28; Asts: Jack Coleman 8
Rochester leads series, 2–0

Edgerton Park Arena, Rochester, New York
Attendance: 4,200

April 11

Boxscore

Rochester Royals 78, New York Knickerbockers 71
Scoring by quarter: 15–17, 20–16, 16–15, 27–23
Pts: Arnie Risen 27; Rebs: Arnie Risen 18; Asts: Bob Davies 8	Pts: Vince Boryla 20; Rebs: Nat Clifton 11; Asts: Dick McGuire 7
Rochester leads series, 3–0

69th Regiment Armory, Manhattan, New York
Attendance: 5,000

April 13

Boxscore

Rochester Royals 73, New York Knickerbockers 79
Scoring by quarter: 10–21, 18–19, 28–17, 17–22
Pts: Arnie Risen 26; Rebs: Arnie Risen 20; Asts: Jack Coleman 9	Pts: Harry Gallatin 22; Rebs: Nat Clifton 17; Asts: Zaslofsky, Clifton 6 each
Rochester leads series, 3–1

69th Regiment Armory, Manhattan, New York
Attendance: 4,000

April 15

Boxscore

New York Knickerbockers 92, Rochester Royals 89
Scoring by quarter: 25–28, 19–21, 29–21, 19–19
Pts: Connie Simmons 26; Rebs: Nat Clifton 10; Asts: Nat Clifton 7	Pts: Bobby Wanzer 21; Rebs: Arnie Risen 14; Asts: Bob Davies 10
Rochester leads series, 3–2

Edgerton Park Arena, Rochester, New York
Attendance: 4,200

April 18

Boxscore

Rochester Royals 73, New York Knickerbockers 80
Scoring by quarter: 21–19, 17–19, 12–15, 23–27
Pts: Arnie Johnson 27; Rebs: Arnie Johnson 15; Asts: Jack Coleman 8	Pts: Max Zaslofsky 23; Rebs: Ernie Vandeweghe 8 Asts: Dick McGuire 6
Series tied, 3–3

69th Regiment Armory, Manhattan, New York
Attendance: 4,500

April 21

Boxscore

New York Knickerbockers 75, Rochester Royals 79
Scoring by quarter: 16–22, 18–18, 26–22, 15–17
Pts: Zaslofsky, Boryla 16 each Rebs: Harry Gallatin 10; Asts: Ernie Vandeweghe 5	Pts: Arnie Risen 24; Rebs: Arnie Risen 13; Asts: Jack Coleman 9
Rochester wins series, 4–3

Edgerton Park Arena, Rochester, New York
Attendance: 4,200

The Knickerbockers led 74–72 with under three minutes later but Arnie Risen and Bob Davies (who combined for 44 points scored in the game) managed to draw quick shots and free throws in the final minutes to give the Royals a 79–75 victory. Contrary to today's practices, there was no trophy presentation or a parade.

== Aftermath ==
This was the first and to date last title for the Rochester Royals, who would move to Cincinnati, Ohio for the 1958 season. The Royals would spend 15 years mired in mediocrity before moving to Kansas City, Missouri in 1972, changing their name in the process to the Kings. One notable highlight was their appearance in the 1981 NBA playoffs, in which their 40–42 team reached the Western Conference finals before losing to the Houston Rockets, who also had a 40–42 record. The Kings moved to Sacramento, California in 1985, where they have remained to this day. The team reached the Western Conference finals in 2002, where they lost in seven games to the Los Angeles Lakers in a highly controversial series. The Kings’ 2002 Western Conference final run was the closest the team got to reaching the NBA Finals in the modern era. The Royals/Kings have the longest NBA title drought, the longest NBA Finals appearance drought, the longest active championship round appearance drought in all four of the American major pro sports leagues, and the third longest championship drought in North American sports.

This would be the Knickerbockers' first of three consecutive appearances in the Finals, but they would lose all three times. They would not return to the Finals until 1970, which they won.
