= Les Harrison (basketball) =

American basketball player, coach, and team owner

Personal information
- Born: August 20, 1904 Rochester, New York, U.S.
- Died: December 23, 1997 (aged 93) Rochester, New York, U.S.

Career information
- High school: East (Rochester, New York)
- Playing career: 1920s–1940s

Career history

Coaching
- 1948–1955: Rochester Royals

Career highlights
- As owner: NBL champion (1946); As coach: NBA champion (1951)
- Basketball Hall of Fame

Lester J. Harrison (August 20, 1904 – December 23, 1997) was an American professional basketball player, coach, and team owner and is a member of the Naismith Memorial Basketball Hall of Fame.

== Career ==
Harrison was born in Rochester, New York. He attended East High School and led the high school to the championship over West High. The victory inspired him to get in the basketball business. In 1923, Harrison began playing, coaching, and organizing semi-professional basketball, working for the Rochester Seagrams, which were later known as the Rochester Ebers in order to appease the newspapers (resistant to liquor advertising).

In 1945, with his brother Joseph (Jack), Harrison founded his own semi-pro team, the Rochester Pros; in 1946, the franchise changed its name to Royals and began play in the National Basketball League (NBL). Harrison oversaw the NBL iteration of his team for three years, with head coach Eddie Malanowicz leading the Royals to three straight NBL finals (of which the team won one, over the Sheboygan Red Skins in 1946) and amassing a record of 99 wins and 43 losses. In 1946, Harrison, as team owner, signed Long Island University standout Dolly King; King became the first African American to have played in the league since 1943 and the first to see substantial playing time for his team. King received taunts from crowds at times, particularly in the playoff series on the road in Fort Wayne, Indiana. Fueled by their indignation of the insults directed at King, the Royals won the series at home in Rochester.

After the 1947–48 season, Harrison moved his team to the Basketball Association of America (BAA), and, after his team spent one year in the BAA, served on the committee that brokered the merger of the BAA and NBL and produced the National Basketball Association (NBA). He became coach of the team in 1948 while Malanowicz stayed as an assistant coach. Harrison was on the sideline for a historic game on January 6, 1951, when the Royals played the Indianapolis Olympians to a game that lasted six overtimes that saw the Royals lose 75–73, which saw eighteen combined points in the overtime periods as a total in a game that encapsulated the pre-shot clock era when it came to stalling with the ball. Harrison collected several talented players for the Royals that included Arnie Risen, nicknamed "Stilts" with his 6'9 frame to go with 6'5 Arnie Johnson and 6'7 Jack Coleman and a backcourt of Bob Davies and Bobby Wanzer. In the 1950–51 season, Royals went 41–27, second behind the perennial threat in the Minneapolis Lakers, who had won the last two championships. The two teams met for a best-of-five Division Finals that saw Rochester pull off three straight wins (including the last two in Rochester) to reach their first NBA Finals. As it turned out, the Royals were the only team to defeat the Lakers in their dynasty era (1948–1954), as the Lakers rebounded to win the next three NBA Finals. In the 1951 NBA Finals against the New York Knicks, the Royals won the first three games before the Knicks won the next three to force Game 7 in Rochester. The Knicks led 74–72 with under three minutes later but Risen and Davies (who combined for 44 points scored in the game) managed to draw quick shots and free throws in the final minutes to give the Royals a 79–75 victory. Harrison noted later that in those days, the NBA did not even have a trophy to give to the team for their championship and there was no parade for the team in the city. Harrison coached the Royals through the 1954–55 season and would retire having led his team to five NBA divisional titles and the 1951 NBA championship.

He remained owner of the Royals to the end of their tenure in Rochester. The 1956 NBA draft was the last for the Royals before their move, and they had the first pick of the draft. Owing to a variety of circumstances (Harrison had stated the team's need for a guard to go with Maurice Stokes), the Royals drafted Si Green over Bill Russell, who was selected by the St. Louis Hawks before being traded to the Boston Celtics for Ed Macauley and Cliff Hagan. After the season, the team moved to Cincinnati, Ohio prior to the 1957 season, with Harrison selling not long after. He noted his feeling on the matter in a 1993 interview, stating “I couldn’t help it. I lacked a five-letter word — I had no money. What happened to basketball is what I envisioned would happen. I thought even from the start that one day it would become big, real big, and it has.”

Harrison coached many Naismith Basketball Hall of Famers, including Bob Davies, Red Holzman, Bobby Wanzer, Al Cervi, Arnie Risen, Pop Gates and Alex Hannum. He also coached Pro Football Hall of Fame quarterback Otto Graham, Chuck "The Rifleman" Connors and Del Rice, an MLB player and the manager of the California Angels in 1972.

== Death ==
Harrison died at Highland Hospital in Rochester on December 23, 1997, at the age of 93. In light of having no wife or children (as was the case with his brother and sister) to leave his belongings to, he bequeathed his Hall of Fame ring, jacket, and artifacts to David and Wendy Dworkin (her mother Barabara was the cousin of Harrison).

== Head coaching record ==
Legend
Regular season	G	Games coached	W	Games won	L	Games lost	W–L %	Win–loss %
Playoffs	PG	Playoff games	PW	Playoff wins	PL	Playoff losses	PW–L %	Playoff win–loss %

Team	Year	G	W	L	W–L%	Finish	PG	PW	PL	PW–L%	Result
Rochester	1948–49	60	45	15	.750	1st in Western	4	2	2	.500	Lost in Division Finals
Rochester	1949–50	68	51	17	.750	2nd in Central	2	0	2	.000	Lost in Division Semifinals
Rochester	1950–51	68	41	27	.603	2nd in Western	14	9	5	.643	Won NBA Championship
Rochester	1951–52	66	41	25	.621	1st in Western	6	3	3	.500	Lost in Division Finals
Rochester	1952–53	70	44	26	.629	2nd in Western	3	1	2	.333	Lost in Division Semifinals
Rochester	1953–54	72	44	28	.611	2nd in Western	6	3	3	.500	Lost in Division Finals
Rochester	1954–55	70	29	43	.403	3rd in Western	3	1	2	.333	Lost in Division Semifinals
Career		476	295	181	.620		38	19	19	.500	

== Legacy ==
In view of his having been a member of the boards of directors of the NBL, BAA, and NBA, having helped broker the merger of the NBL and BAA, and having been a proponent of the introduction of the 24-second shot clock, Harrison was inducted into the Naismith Memorial Basketball Hall of Fame as a contributor in 1980. His induction class included Jerry West, Oscar Robertson, Jerry Lucas, Dallas Shirley and Everett Shelton. In 1990, he was inducted into the International Jewish Sports Hall of Fame. For his part, Harrison in his later years stated the importance of Syracuse owner Danny Biasone (inducted into the Hall of Fame after his death in 2000) in getting the "fans' interest" with the shot clock that he was responsible for lobbying for the NBA to adopt in 1954; Harrison put his full support behind the idea done by Biasone along with Leo Ferris, which still is in use today.

The basketball court at the Blue Cross Arena in Rochester is named in his honor and plays host to the Section V high school basketball tournament each year. It also serves as home court for the Rochester Razorsharks of the Premier Basketball League.
