= 1950–51 Washington Capitols season =

Aborted NBA professional basketball team season

- Head coach: Bones McKinney
- General manager: Rob Foster
- Owner: Mike Uline
- Arena: Washington Coliseum

Results
- Record: 10–25 (.286)
- Place: Division: 6th (Eastern)
- Playoff finish: Did not qualify
- Stats at Basketball Reference
- Radio: WWDC

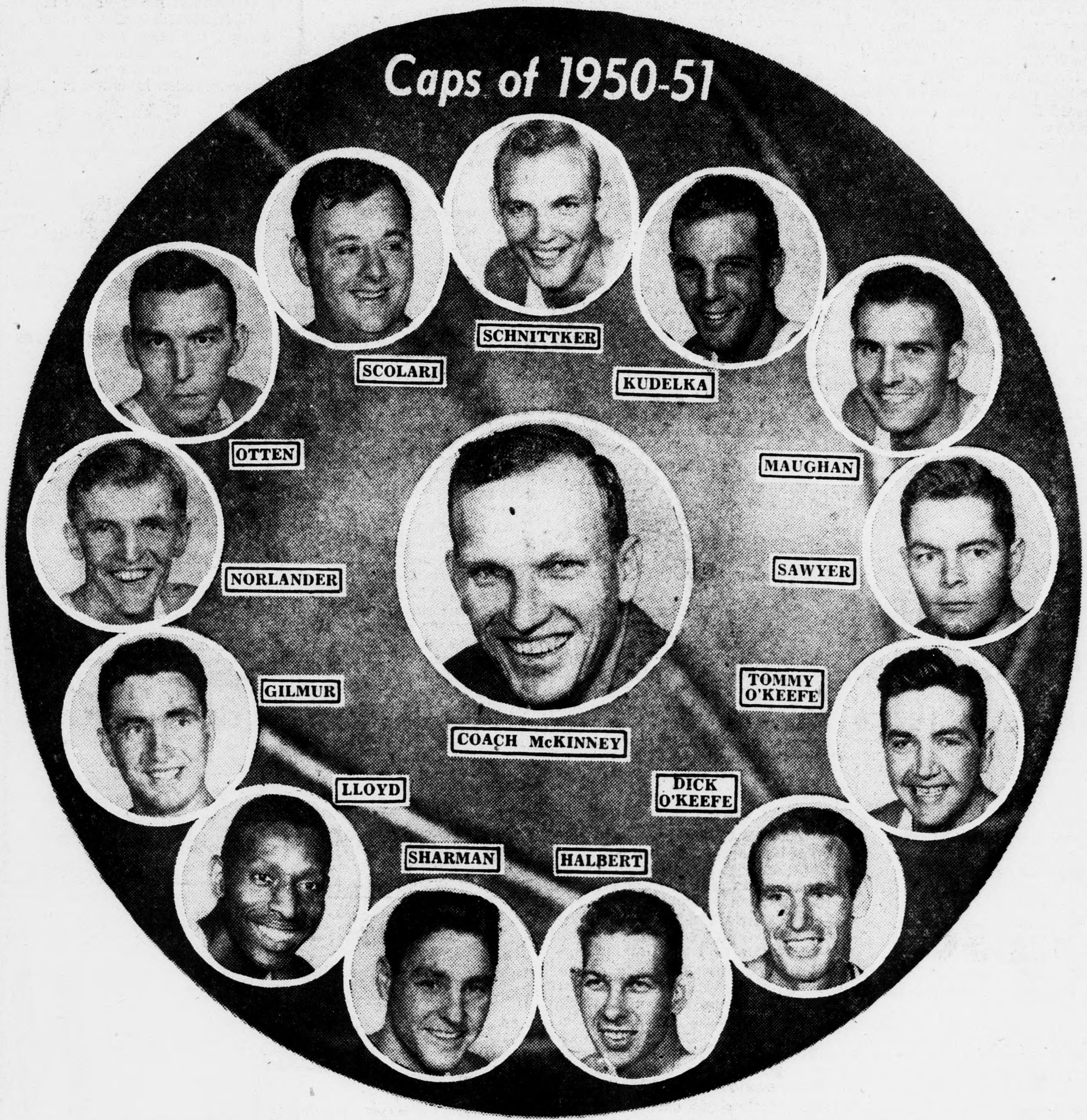
The 1950–51 Washington Capitols

The 1950–51 Washington Capitols season was the Capitols' fifth and final season in the NBA. Midway through the season, the franchise ceased operations. Despite this being their final season in the NBA, the Capitols would appear in the following season after this one under the original American Basketball League, though that team would also fold during the middle of that season as well (though that related to the NBA threatening to sue the new Capitols and the ABL if they tried to take the original franchise's history away from the NBA alongside the team's name). One lesser known, yet notable aspect from this season had the Capitols be involved in multiple rigged games orchestrated by NBA referee Sol Levy, with Levy failing to rig a match between the Capitols and the Minneapolis Lakers on November 4 to favor the Capitols, but successfully rig a match against the Boston Celtics to have Boston win a week later on November 11, which later led to Levy being arrested for his actions and charged as an accomplice in the CCNY point-shaving scandal of 1951.

== BAA/NBA Draft ==
Round	Pick	Player	Position(s)	Nationality	College
1	4	Dick Schnittker	PF	United States	Ohio State
2	16	Bill Sharman	SG	United States	USC
3	28	Alan Sawyer	SF	United States	UCLA
4	40	Tommy O'Keefe	PG/SG	United States	Georgetown
5	52	Claude Overton	SG	United States	East Central State
6	64	Warren Cartier	G	United States	North Carolina State
7	76	Jim Cathcart	SF	United States	Arkansas
8	88	Joe Greenbach	PG	United States	Santa Clara
9	100	Earl Lloyd	F/C	United States	West Virginia State
10	112	Joe Noertker	G	United States	Virginia

Earl Lloyd would be the first African American player drafted to officially play in the NBA due to the Capitols making their regular season debut first over the Boston Celtics with Chuck Cooper and the New York Knickerbockers with Nathaniel Clifton. Lloyd's breaking of the racial barrier in the NBA would happen years after Jackie Robinson would do it for Major League Baseball and the all-black Dayton Rens had played in the NBA's precursor in the National Basketball League after replacing the Detroit Vagabond Kings during the NBL's final season of existence. However, this draft would also be the final draft that the Capitols would ever participate in, as well as become the only draft they'd ever take part in under the official NBA draft name, as they would have the magnanimous misnomer of being the first NBA team to fold operations during a season of play, with such a dubious feat not occurring again in the NBA until four seasons later in the 1954-55 NBA season.

== Roster ==
1950–51 Washington Capitols roster
Players

Pos.	No.	Player	Height	Weight	DOB	From
F	17	Edward Bartels	6 ft 5 in (1.96 m)	195 lb (88 kg)		NC State
G/F		Tommy Byrnes	6 ft 3 in (1.91 m)	175 lb (79 kg)		Seton Hall
F/C	11	Chuck Gilmur	6 ft 4 in (1.93 m)	225 lb (102 kg)		Washington
C	14	Chick Halbert	6 ft 9 in (2.06 m)	225 lb (102 kg)		West Texas A&M
G/F	18, 23	Frank Kudelka	6 ft 2 in (1.88 m)	193 lb (88 kg)		Saint Mary's
SF		Earl Lloyd	6 ft 5 in (1.96 m)	200 lb (91 kg)		West Virginia State
F	12	Ariel Maughan	6 ft 4 in (1.93 m)	190 lb (86 kg)		Utah State
SF	29	Bones McKinney	6 ft 6 in (1.98 m)	185 lb (84 kg)		North Carolina
C	15	Ed Mikan	6 ft 8 in (2.03 m)	230 lb (104 kg)		DePaul
F	16	Johnny Norlander	6 ft 3 in (1.91 m)	180 lb (82 kg)		Hamline
G/F	13	Dick O'Keefe	6 ft 2 in (1.88 m)	185 lb (84 kg)		Santa Clara
G		Tommy O'Keefe	6 ft 2 in (1.88 m)	185 lb (84 kg)		Georgetown
C	15	Don Otten	6 ft 10 in (2.08 m)	240 lb (109 kg)		Bowling Green
F	17, 29	Alan Sawyer	6 ft 5 in (1.96 m)	195 lb (88 kg)		UCLA
SF	22	Dick Schnittker	6 ft 5 in (1.96 m)	200 lb (91 kg)		Ohio State
PG	20	Fred Scolari	5 ft 10 in (1.78 m)	180 lb (82 kg)		San Francisco
SG	10	Bill Sharman	6 ft 1 in (1.85 m)	175 lb (79 kg)		USC

Coaches
Head coach
- Bones McKinney

Legend
- (DP) Unsigned draft pick
- (FA) Free agent
- (S) Suspended
- Injured

== Regular season ==
=== Season standings ===
Eastern Division	W	L	PCT	GB	Home	Road	Neutral	Div
x-Philadelphia Warriors	40	26	.606	–	28–4	11–21	1–1	22–14
x-Boston Celtics	39	30	.565	1	25–5	10–23	4–2	21–19
x-New York Knicks	36	30	.545	4	22–5	10–25	4–0	21–15
x-Syracuse Nationals	32	34	.485	8	23–10	9–24	–	19–17
Baltimore Bullets	24	42	.364	16	20–12	4–24	0–6	12–24
Washington Capitols†	10	25	.286	30	7–12	3–12	0–1	6–12

=== Game log ===
1950–51 game log
Total: 10–25
October

Game	Date	Team	Score	High points	Location Attendance	Record
1	October 31	@ Rochester	L 70–78	Fred Scolari (18)		0–1

November

Game	Date	Team	Score	High points	Location Attendance	Record
2	November 1	Indianapolis	W 100–84	Alan Sawyer (17)		1–1
3	November 4	Minneapolis	L 85–91	Sawyer, Sharman (19)		1–2
4	November 8	Baltimore	W 86–81	Fred Scolari (24)		2–2
5	November 11	Boston	L 77–78	Fred Scolari (21)		2–3
6	November 12	@ Fort Wayne	L 73–87	Fred Scolari (14)		2–4
7	November 14	New York	L 87–92	Fred Scolari (16)		2–5
8	November 15	vs Boston	L 74–79	Bill Sharman (20)		2–6
9	November 18	Fort Wayne	W 118–75	Schnittker, Scolari (20)		3–6
10	November 19	@ Boston	W 81–75	Frank Kudelka (15)		4–6
11	November 21	@ Philadelphia	L 78–83	Frank Kudelka (13)		4–7
12	November 22	Tri-Cities	W 65–60	Fred Scolari (13)		5–7
13	November 23	@ New York	L 78–109	Schnittker, Scolari (17)		5–8
14	November 25	Syracuse	L 67–77	Don Otten (22)		5–9
15	November 26	@ Syracuse	L 76–90	Chick Halbert (17)		5–10
16	November 28	@ Rochester	L 71–87	Fred Scolari (17)		5–11
17	November 29	Rochester	L 71–72	Bill Sharman (20)		5–12
18	November 30	@ Boston	W 85–81	Fred Scolari (23)		6–12

December

Game	Date	Team	Score	High points	Location Attendance	Record
19	December 2	Boston	L 75–83	Bill Sharman (18)		6–13
20	December 6	Indianapolis	L 79–101	Dick Schnittker (16)		6–14
21	December 9	New York	W 91–84	Fred Scolari (22)		7–14
22	December 10	@ Fort Wayne	L 81–97	Dick Schnittker (18)		7–15
23	December 13	Boston	W 110–79	Fred Scolari (24)		8–15
24	December 16	Philadelphia	L 88–96	Fred Scolari (15)		8–16
25	December 20	Rochester	L 76–94	Bill Sharman (15)		8–17
26	December 23	Indianapolis	L 79–87 (OT)	Dick Schnittker (19)		8–18
27	December 25	@ Minneapolis	L 79–93	Fred Scolari (17)		8–19
28	December 26	@ Indianapolis	W 88–81	Fred Scolari (24)		9–19
29	December 28	@ Tri-Cities	L 80–97	Fred Scolari (19)		9–20
30	December 30	@ Rochester	L 77–91	Bill Sharman (19)		9–21

January

Game	Date	Team	Score	High points	Location Attendance	Record
31	January 1	@ Baltimore	L 71–83	Bill Sharman (18)		9–22
32	January 3	Baltimore	W 92–82	Bill Sharman (21)		10–22
33	January 6	Fort Wayne	L 76–91	Bill Sharman (17)		10–23
34	January 7	@ Boston	L 86–91 (OT)	Fred Scolari (19)		10–24
35	January 9	@ Philadelphia	L 74–102	Bill Sharman (17)		10–25

== Dispersal Draft ==
After the Capitols franchise folded operations on January 9, 1951, the NBA would conduct a dispersal draft on the team's players later that same day. It effectively became the final dispersal draft of the 1950–51 season, following the dispersal drafts involving the Waterloo Hawks, Anderson Packers, St. Louis Bombers, and Chicago Stags franchises earlier in the 1950 offseason period. As such, the following teams acquired these players from the Capitols during the dispersal draft period.

- Baltimore Bullets: Chick Halbert
- Boston Celtics: Bones McKinney & Frank Kudelka
- Fort Wayne Pistons: Bill Sharman
- Minneapolis Lakers: Dick Schnittker
- Syracuse Nationals: Earl Lloyd & Fred Scolari
- Tri-Cities Blackhawks: Alan Sawyer
