= 1950–51 New York Knicks season =

Season of National Basketball Association team the New York Knicks

- Head coach: Joe Lapchick
- General manager: Ned Irish
- Arena: Madison Square Garden

Results
- Record: 36–30 (.545)
- Place: Division: 3rd (Eastern)
- Playoff finish: NBA Finals (lost to Royals 3–4)
- Stats at Basketball Reference

Local media
- Television: WPIX
- Radio: WMGM

The 1950–51 New York Knickerbockers season was the fifth season for the team in the National Basketball Association (NBA). In the regular season, the Knickerbockers finished in third place in the Eastern Division, and their 36–30 record gave them a berth in the NBA Playoffs for the fifth consecutive year.

New York faced the Boston Celtics in the first round of the Eastern Division playoffs, and won the best-of-three series 2–0 to advance to the division finals. In that series, the Knickerbockers defeated the Syracuse Nationals 3–2 in a best-of-five series, earning the franchise's first trip to the NBA Finals. The Rochester Royals faced the Knickerbockers in the Finals, and won the first three games of the best-of-seven series. New York won the next three games to even up the series, but Rochester won the seventh game by a score of 79–75. It was the first of four times in NBA history when a team came within one game of a reverse-sweep in a best of seven series.

== NBA draft ==
Note: This is not an extensive list; it only covers the first and second rounds, and any other players picked by the franchise that played at least one game in the league.

Round	Pick	Player	Position	Nationality	School/Club team
1	6	Irwin Dambrot	F	United States	CCNY
2	18	Herb Scherer	C	United States	Long Island

== Roster ==
1950-51 New York Knicks roster
Players

Pos.	No.	Player	Height	Weight	DOB	From
SF	12	Vince Boryla	6 ft 5 in (1.96 m)	210 lb (95 kg)		Denver
PF	19	Nathaniel Clifton	6 ft 6 in (1.98 m)	220 lb (100 kg)		Xavier (LA)
C		Ray Ellefson	6 ft 8 in (2.03 m)	230 lb (104 kg)		West Texas A&M
F/C	11	Harry Gallatin	6 ft 6 in (1.98 m)	210 lb (95 kg)		Truman State
F	14	Gene James	6 ft 4 in (1.93 m)	180 lb (82 kg)		Marshall
SF	17	George Kaftan	6 ft 3 in (1.91 m)	190 lb (86 kg)		Holy Cross
F	6, 16	Tony Lavelli	6 ft 3 in (1.91 m)	185 lb (84 kg)		Yale
G	7	Ray Lumpp	6 ft 1 in (1.85 m)	178 lb (81 kg)		NYU
PG	15	Dick McGuire	6 ft 0 in (1.83 m)	180 lb (82 kg)		St. John's
G/F	10	Tex Ritter	6 ft 2 in (1.88 m)	185 lb (84 kg)		Eastern Kentucky
F/C	18	Connie Simmons	6 ft 8 in (2.03 m)	222 lb (101 kg)
G/F	9	Ernie Vandeweghe	6 ft 3 in (1.91 m)	195 lb (88 kg)		Colgate
SG	5	Max Zaslofsky	6 ft 2 in (1.88 m)	170 lb (77 kg)		St. John's

Coaches
Head coach
- Joe Lapchick

Legend
- (DP) Unsigned draft pick
- (FA) Free agent
- (S) Suspended
- Injured

Roster

== Regular season ==
=== Season standings ===
Eastern Division	W	L	PCT	GB	Home	Road	Neutral	Div
x-Philadelphia Warriors	40	26	.606	–	28–4	11–21	1–1	22–14
x-Boston Celtics	39	30	.565	1	25–5	10–23	4–2	21–19
x-New York Knicks	36	30	.545	4	22–5	10–25	4–0	21–15
x-Syracuse Nationals	32	34	.485	8	23–10	9–24	–	19–17
Baltimore Bullets	24	42	.364	16	20–12	4–24	0–6	12–24
Washington Capitols†	10	25	.286	30	7–12	3–12	0–1	6–12

x = clinched playoff spot

=== Game log ===
1950–51 game log
#	Date	Opponent	Score	High points	Record
1	November 4	at Tri-Cities	76–87	Max Zaslofsky (17)	0–1
2	November 5	at Tri-Cities	95–98 (OT)	Vince Boryla (35)	0–2
3	November 7	at Indianapolis	73–86	Vince Boryla (18)	0–3
4	November 9	Indianapolis	73–85	Ernie Vandeweghe (14)	0–4
5	November 11	Syracuse	74–72 (OT)	Vince Boryla (19)	1–4
6	November 14	at Washington	92–87	Vince Boryla (21)	2–4
7	November 16	Minneapolis	71–69	Vince Boryla (25)	3–4
8	November 18	Philadelphia	93–87	Max Zaslofsky (21)	4–4
9	November 19	at Syracuse	83–96	Vince Boryla (22)	4–5
10	November 21	Boston	83–89	Max Zaslofsky (17)	4–6
11	November 22	at Baltimore	87–73	Vince Boryla (21)	5–6
12	November 23	Washington	109–78	Max Zaslofsky (20)	6–6
13	November 26	at Boston	90–93 (2OT)	Max Zaslofsky (17)	6–7
14	November 28	Syracuse	108–84	Max Zaslofsky (17)	7–7
15	November 30	Rochester	79–74	Harry Gallatin (13)	8–7
16	December 3	at Tri-Cities	100–92	Vince Boryla (27)	9–7
17	December 5	at Indianapolis	89–95	Nathaniel Clifton (16)	9–8
18	December 6	at Minneapolis	62–84	Max Zaslofsky (15)	9–9
19	December 9	at Washington	84–91	Ray Lumpp (18)	9–10
20	December 10	Indianapolis	106–84	Harry Gallatin (25)	10–10
21	December 12	at Philadelphia	91–101	Vince Boryla (26)	10–11
22	December 16	Fort Wayne	86–77	Vince Boryla (19)	11–11
23	December 17	at Syracuse	86–95	Nathaniel Clifton (20)	11–12
24	December 19	vs Boston	86–80	Vince Boryla (23)	12–12
25	December 23	Philadelphia	83–79 (2OT)	Boryla, Zaslofsky (15)	13–12
26	December 25	at Philadelphia	86–84 (OT)	Harry Gallatin (25)	14–12
27	December 27	at Philadelphia	79–74	Vince Boryla (18)	15–12
28	December 30	Boston	77–60	Vince Boryla (20)	16–12
29	December 31	at Boston	90–100	Max Zaslofsky (19)	16–13
30	January 1	at Rochester	88–91 (OT)	Connie Simmons (20)	16–14
31	January 6	Syracuse	85–87 (OT)	Max Zaslofsky (22)	16–15
32	January 7	at Fort Wayne	79–76	Boryla, Lavelli (14)	17–15
33	January 8	vs Fort Wayne	75–70 (OT)	Harry Gallatin (17)	18–15
34	January 10	at Minneapolis	65–70	Vince Boryla (17)	18–16
35	January 13	Baltimore	92–79	Harry Gallatin (20)	19–16
36	January 14	at Baltimore	91–93 (2OT)	Harry Gallatin (25)	19–17
37	January 18	Minneapolis	95–78	Vince Boryla (30)	20–17
38	January 21	Rochester	88–83 (OT)	Max Zaslofsky (27)	21–17
39	January 23	at Rochester	92–102 (4OT)	Vince Boryla (24)	21–18
40	January 24	Tri-Cities	95–85	Max Zaslofsky (22)	22–18
41	January 27	Boston	76–75	Max Zaslofsky (15)	23–18
42	January 31	Baltimore	89–77	Harry Gallatin (23)	24–18
43	February 1	at Syracuse	93–90	Boryla, Gallatin (21)	25–18
44	February 3	at Baltimore	83–72	Harry Gallatin (19)	26–18
45	February 4	Indianapolis	83–105	Boryla, Gallatin (17)	26–19
46	February 6	vs Baltimore	91–82	Harry Gallatin (29)	27–19
47	February 8	at Syracuse	83–96	Harry Gallatin (13)	27–20
48	February 10	Fort Wayne	73–62	Vince Boryla (18)	28–20
49	February 11	at Fort Wayne	96–120	Connie Simmons (21)	28–21
50	February 14	Rochester	81–65	Max Zaslofsky (17)	29–21
51	February 15	at Philadelphia	98–93	Harry Gallatin (22)	30–21
52	February 17	Syracuse	88–75	Max Zaslofsky (13)	31–21
53	February 21	at Boston	85–87 (OT)	Dick McGuire (16)	31–22
54	February 22	Tri-Cities	94–90	Connie Simmons (24)	32–22
55	February 24	Philadelphia	64–70	Clifton, Gallatin (13)	32–23
56	February 25	at Syracuse	93–98	Vince Boryla (21)	32–24
57	February 27	at Rochester	90–100	Max Zaslofsky (18)	32–25
58	March 1	at Boston	84–78	Max Zaslofsky (18)	33–25
59	March 3	Syracuse	97–78	Max Zaslofsky (22)	34–25
60	March 4	at Fort Wayne	98–105	Vince Boryla (29)	34–26
61	March 6	at Philadelphia	76–96	Vince Boryla (19)	34–27
62	March 8	Minneapolis	97–94 (OT)	Vince Boryla (18)	35–27
63	March 11	at Baltimore	89–112	Max Zaslofsky (18)	35–28
64	March 14	at Tri-Cities	92–91	Harry Gallatin (24)	36–28
65	March 15	at Indianapolis	70–74	Gallatin, Zaslofsky (14)	36–29
66	March 18	at Minneapolis	68–86	George Kaftan (16)	36–30

== Playoffs ==
1951 playoff game log
Division semifinals: 2–0 (home: 1–0; road: 1–0)

Game	Date	Team	Score	High points	High assists	Location	Series
1	March 20	@ Boston	W 83–69	Vince Boryla (20)	—	Boston Garden	1–0
2	March 22	Boston	W 92–78	Max Zaslofsky (27)	Dick McGuire (9)	Madison Square Garden III	2–0

Division finals: 3–2 (home: 3–0; road: 0–2)

Game	Date	Team	Score	High points	High assists	Location	Series
1	March 28	Syracuse	W 103–92	Vince Boryla (30)	Dick McGuire (13)	Madison Square Garden III	1–0
2	March 29	@ Syracuse	L 80–102	Ray Lumpp (16)	Vandeweghe, McGuire (5)	State Fair Coliseum	1–1
3	March 31	Syracuse	W 77–75 (OT)	Harry Gallatin (18)	—	Madison Square Garden III	2–1
4	April 1	@ Syracuse	L 83–90	Max Zaslofsky (20)	Dick McGuire (9)	State Fair Coliseum	2–2
5	April 4	Syracuse	W 83–81	Vince Boryla (23)	Ernie Vandeweghe (5)	Madison Square Garden III	3–2

NBA Finals: 3–4 (home: 2–1; road: 1–3)

Game	Date	Team	Score	High points	High rebounds	High assists	Location Attendance	Series
1	April 7	@ Rochester	L 65–92	Vince Boryla (13)	Simmons, Clifton (10)	Ernie Vandeweghe (4)	Edgerton Park Arena; 4,200	0–1
2	April 8	@ Rochester	L 84–99	Max Zaslofsky (28)	Harry Gallatin (17)	Vince Boryla (7)	Edgerton Park Arena; 4,200	0–2
3	April 11	Rochester	L 71–78	Vince Boryla (20)	Nat Clifton (11)	Dick McGuire (7)	69th Regiment Armory; 5,000	0–3
4	April 13	Rochester	W 79–73	Harry Gallatin (22)	Nat Clifton (17)	Zaslofsky, Clifton (6)	69th Regiment Armory; 4,000	1–3
5	April 15	@ Rochester	W 92–89	Connie Simmons (26)	Nat Clifton (10)	Nat Clifton (7)	Edgerton Park Arena; 4,200	2–3
6	April 18	Rochester	W 80–73	Max Zaslofsky (23)	Ernie Vandeweghe (8)	Dick McGuire (6)	69th Regiment Armory; 4,500	3–3
7	April 21	@ Rochester	L 75–79	Zaslofsky, Boryla (16)	Harry Gallatin (10)	Ernie Vandeweghe (5)	Edgerton Park Arena; 4,200	3–4

1951 schedule

== Player statistics ==
Legend
GP	Games played	GS	Games started	MPG	Minutes per game
FG%	Field-goal percentage	3P%	3-point field-goal percentage	FT%	Free-throw percentage
RPG	Rebounds per game	APG	Assists per game	SPG	Steals per game
BPG	Blocks per game	PPG	Points per game

== Awards and records ==
- Dick McGuire, All-NBA Second Team

== See also ==
- 1950–51 NBA season
