= Paul Noel =

American basketball player

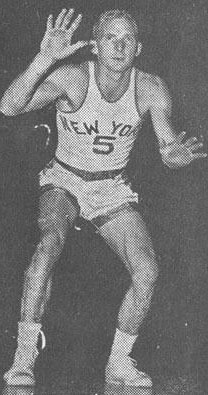

Personal information
- Born: August 4, 1924 Midway, Kentucky, U.S.
- Died: November 16, 2005 (aged 81) Versailles, Kentucky, U.S.
- Listed height: 6 ft 4 in (1.93 m)
- Listed weight: 185 lb (84 kg)

Career information
- High school: Midway (Midway, Kentucky)
- College: Kentucky (1942–1943)
- Playing career: 1947–1952
- Position: Forward
- Number: 5, 7, 15

Career history
- 1947–1950: New York Knicks
- 1950–1951: Rochester Royals
- 1951–1952: Elmira Colonels

Career highlights
- NBA champion (1951)
- Stats at NBA.com
- Stats at Basketball Reference

Paul Wendel Noel (August 4, 1924 – November 16, 2005) was an American professional basketball player.

Born in Midway, Kentucky, Noel was a 6'4" forward from the University of Kentucky, Noel played five seasons (1947–1952) in the Basketball Association of America/National Basketball Association as a member of the New York Knicks and Rochester Royals. He averaged 3.3 points per game in his BAA/NBA career and won a league championship with Rochester in 1951.

== BAA/NBA career statistics ==
Legend
GP	Games played	GS	Games started	MPG	Minutes per game
FG%	Field goal percentage	3P%	3-point field goal percentage	FT%	Free throw percentage
RPG	Rebounds per game	APG	Assists per game	SPG	Steals per game
BPG	Blocks per game	PPG	Points per game	**Bold**	Career high
†	Won an NBA championship

=== Regular season ===
Year	Team	GP	MPG	FG%	FT%	RPG	APG	PPG
1947–48	New York	29	–	.290	.633	–	.1	3.4
1948–49	New York	47	–	.253	.617	–	.7	**3.8**
1949–50	New York	**65**	–	**.337**	.609	–	**1.0**	**3.8**
1950–51†	Rochester	52	–	.282	**.711**	**1.6**	.7	2.5
1951–52	Rochester	8	**4.0**	.222	.667	.5	.4	.8
Career		201	4.0	.291	.636	1.4	.7	3.3

=== Playoffs ===
Year	Team	GP	MPG	FG%	FT%	RPG	APG	PPG
1948	New York	3	–	.000	.000	–	.0	.0
1949	New York	4	–	**.417**	**.800**	–	**.5**	**3.5**
1950	New York	5	–	.143	.333	–	.2	.6
1951†	Rochester	**9**	–	.389	.714	**1.0**	.1	2.1
Career		21	–	.295	.625	1.0	.2	1.7
