= 1950–51 Rochester Royals season =

NBA professional basketball team season (won championship)

- NBA champions
- Head coach: Les Harrison
- Owners: Jack Harrison; Les Harrison
- Arena: Edgerton Park Arena

Results
- Record: 41–27 (.603)
- Place: Division: 2nd (Western)
- Playoff finish: NBA Champions (Defeated Knicks 4–3)
- Stats at Basketball Reference

Local media
- Television: WHAM 8
- Radio: WHAM

The 1950–51 Rochester Royals season was the third season for the team in the National Basketball Association (NBA). The Royals finished the season by winning their first NBA Championship.

The Royals scored 84.6 points per game and allowed 81.7 points per game. Rochester was led up front by Arnie Risen, a 6–9, 200-pound center nicknamed "Stilts", along with 6–5 Arnie Johnson and 6–7 Jack Coleman. This season was also notable for them due to it being the only season where, after many years of failure in the preceding NBL and BAA before merging those leagues together to become the NBA, the Royals would finally conquer superstar center George Mikan and the Minneapolis Lakers, beating them 3–1 in the Western Division Finals before winning the 1951 NBA Finals (albeit by narrowing avoiding a reverse sweep from the New York Knicks). The backcourt was manned by Bob Davies and Bobby Wanzer. Among the key reserves was a guard from City College of New York named William "Red" Holzman. HoopsHype would later rank this squad as the team with the ninth-easiest route to win the NBA Finals due to the records of both their first round opponent and their championship opponent in the Fort Wayne Pistons and New York Knicks respectively. The Royals (now currently going by the Sacramento Kings) would since have the longest NBA drought between championship teams following their sole NBA Finals championship this season.

== Game log ==
1950–51 Game log
#	Date	Opponent	Score	High points	Record
1	October 31	Washington	70–78	Arnie Risen (20)	1–0
2	November 4	Fort Wayne	71–95	Bobby Wanzer (18)	2–0
3	November 11	Tri-Cities	77–86	Davies, Risen (18)	3–0
4	November 12	at Tri-Cities	79–82 (OT)	Bobby Wanzer (17)	3–1
5	November 15	at Fort Wayne	85–89	Jack Coleman (22)	3–2
6	November 18	Minneapolis	86–77 (2OT)	Bob Davies (21)	3–3
7	November 19	at Minneapolis	77–90	Coleman, Davies (15)	3–4
8	November 21	at Indianapolis	79–91	Arnie Risen (16)	3–5
9	November 23	at Philadelphia	71–89	Jack Coleman (15)	3–6
10	November 25	Boston	82–90	Risen, Saul (17)	4–6
11	November 28	Washington	71–87	Davies, Johnson (15)	5–6
12	November 29	at Washington	72–71	Bob Davies (14)	6–6
13	November 30	at New York	74–79	Davies, Risen (14)	6–7
14	December 2	Indianapolis	72–94	Arnie Risen (22)	7–7
15	December 3	at Fort Wayne	79–80	Arnie Risen (16)	7–8
16	December 6	at Baltimore	74–70	Bob Davies (18)	8–8
17	December 7	at Syracuse	76–69	Bob Davies (18)	9–8
18	December 10	Philadelphia	84–99	Jack Coleman (23)	10–8
19	December 12	Baltimore	87–102	Bobby Wanzer (24)	11–8
20	December 13	at Minneapolis	82–72	Bob Davies (28)	12–8
21	December 16	Syracuse	79–75 (OT)	Arnie Risen (19)	12–9
22	December 17	at Boston	75–88	Bob Davies (17)	12–10
23	December 20	at Washington	94–76	Arnie Risen (23)	13–10
24	December 23	Fort Wayne	65–77	Bill Calhoun (15)	14–10
25	December 25	Boston	77–90	Bobby Wanzer (25)	15–10
26	December 27	at Fort Wayne	74–68	Red Holzman (18)	16–10
27	December 28	Minneapolis	67–75	Arnie Risen (17)	17–10
28	December 30	Washington	77–91	Bobby Wanzer (21)	18–10
29	January 1	New York	88–91 (OT)	Arnie Risen (28)	19–10
30	January 6	Indianapolis	75–73 (6OT)	Arnie Risen (26)	19–11
31	January 7	at Minneapolis	57–69	Jack Coleman (16)	19–12
32	January 9	at Indianapolis	77–59	Arnie Risen (19)	20–12
33	January 10	at Baltimore	80–78 (OT)	Arnie Johnson (17)	21–12
34	January 11	at Philadelphia	79–82	Jack Coleman (24)	21–13
35	January 13	Fort Wayne	78–99	Frank Saul (14)	22–13
36	January 14	at Syracuse	63–92	Jack Coleman (14)	22–14
37	January 16	Tri-Cities	89–97	Arnie Risen (20)	23–14
38	January 18	at Syracuse	96–87	Johnson, Risen (16)	24–14
39	January 20	Philadelphia	101–87	Davies, Risen (19)	24–15
40	January 21	at New York	83–88 (OT)	Arnie Risen (20)	24–16
41	January 23	New York	92–102 (4OT)	Arnie Risen (26)	25–16
42	January 27	Syracuse	83–85	Arnie Risen (20)	26–16
43	January 28	at Fort Wayne	88–93	Arnie Risen (22)	26–17
44	January 30	Baltimore	90–95	Bob Davies (28)	27–17
45	January 31	at Indianapolis	63–68	Arnie Risen (21)	27–18
46	February 3	Philadelphia	61–65	Arnie Risen (24)	28–18
47	February 4	at Tri-Cities	81–84	Arnie Risen (24)	28–19
48	February 6	at Indianapolis	76–78	Arnie Risen (24)	28–20
49	February 8	at Minneapolis	58–69	Calhoun, Davies, Risen (11)	28–21
50	February 10	Tri-Cities	90–98	Bob Davies (25)	29–21
51	February 11	at Boston	77–93	Bob Davies (24)	29–22
52	February 14	at New York	65–81	Red Holzman (13)	29–23
53	February 17	Minneapolis	82–87	Bob Davies (28)	30–23
54	February 18	at Tri-Cities	83–89	Bob Davies (18)	30–24
55	February 20	Baltimore	89–105	Bobby Wanzer (27)	31–24
56	February 22	at Philadelphia	90–98	Arnie Risen (23)	31–25
57	February 24	Tri-Cities	89–99	Bob Davies (17)	32–25
58	February 25	at Tri-Cities	82–78	Bob Davies (14)	33–25
59	February 27	New York	90–100	Bob Davies (19)	34–25
60	March 3	Fort Wayne	79–89	Arnie Risen (24)	35–25
61	March 6	Minneapolis	79–90	Arnie Risen (23)	36–25
62	March 9	at Indianapolis	91–84	Bobby Wanzer (22)	37–25
63	March 10	Syracuse	86–107	Bob Davies (25)	38–25
64	March 11	Indianapolis	95–88	Jack Coleman (23)	38–26
65	March 13	at Boston	111–107 (2OT)	Jack Coleman (25)	39–26
66	March 15	at Baltimore	87–93	Arnie Risen (26)	39–27
67	March 17	Boston	89–114	Bobby Wanzer (29)	40–27
68	March 18	Indianapolis	79–91	Arnie Risen (25)	41–27

== Roster ==
1950–51 Rochester Royals roster
Players

Pos.	No.	Player	Height	Weight	DOB	From
SG	19	Bill Calhoun	6 ft 3 in (1.91 m)	180 lb (82 kg)	1927-11-04	CCSF
PF	10	Jack Coleman	6 ft 7 in (2.01 m)	195 lb (88 kg)	1924-05-23	Louisville
PG	11	Bob Davies	6 ft 1 in (1.85 m)	175 lb (79 kg)	1920-01-15	Seton Hall
PG	16	Red Holzman	5 ft 10 in (1.78 m)	175 lb (79 kg)	1920-08-10	CCNY
SF	12	Arnie Johnson	6 ft 5 in (1.96 m)	236 lb (107 kg)	1920-05-16	Bemidji State
SF	20	Joe McNamee	6 ft 6 in (1.98 m)	210 lb (95 kg)	1926-09-24	San Francisco
C	18	Ed Mikan	6 ft 8 in (2.03 m)	230 lb (104 kg)	1925-10-20	DePaul
F	07, 15	Paul Noel	6 ft 4 in (1.93 m)	185 lb (84 kg)	1924-08-17	Kentucky
C	14	Arnie Risen	6 ft 9 in (2.06 m)	200 lb (91 kg)		Ohio State
SG	3	Pep Saul	6 ft 2 in (1.88 m)	185 lb (84 kg)		Seton Hall
G	9	Bobby Wanzer	6 ft 0 in (1.83 m)	170 lb (77 kg)	1921-06-04	Seton Hall

Coaches
Head coach
- Les Harrison

Legend
- (DP) Unsigned draft pick
- (FA) Free agent
- (S) Suspended
- Injured

Roster

== Playoffs ==
1951 playoff game log
Division Semifinals: 2–1 (home: 2–0; road: 0–1)

Game	Date	Team	Score	High points	Location	Series
1	March 20	Fort Wayne	W 110–81	Bob Davies (21)	Edgerton Park Arena	1–0
2	March 22	@ Fort Wayne	L 78–83	Risen, Davies (16)	North Side High School Gym	1–1
3	March 24	Fort Wayne	W 97–78	Bobby Wanzer (20)	Edgerton Park Arena	2–1

Division Finals: 3–1 (home: 2–0; road: 1–1)

Game	Date	Team	Score	High points	Location	Series
1	March 29	@ Minneapolis	L 73–76	Arnie Risen (24)	Minneapolis Auditorium	0–1
2	March 31	@ Minneapolis	W 70–66	Red Holzman (23)	Minneapolis Auditorium	1–1
3	April 1	Minneapolis	W 83–70	Johnson, Wanzer (20)	Edgerton Park Arena	2–1
4	April 3	Minneapolis	W 80–75	Arnie Risen (26)	Edgerton Park Arena	3–1

NBA Finals: 4–3 (home: 3–1; road: 1–2)

Game	Date	Team	Score	High points	High rebounds	High assists	Location Attendance	Series
1	April 7	New York	W 92–65	Arnie Risen (24)	Arnie Risen (15)	Bobby Wanzer (9)	Edgerton Park Arena; 4,200	1–0
2	April 8	New York	W 99–84	Bob Davies (24)	Jack Coleman (28)	Jack Coleman (8)	Edgerton Park Arena; 4,200	2–0
3	April 11	@ New York	W 78–71	Arnie Risen (27)	Arnie Risen (18)	Bob Davies (8)	69th Regiment Armory; 5,000	3–0
4	April 13	@ New York	L 73–79	Arnie Risen (26)	Arnie Risen (20)	Jack Coleman (9)	69th Regiment Armory; 4,000	3–1
5	April 15	New York	L 89–92	Bobby Wanzer (21)	Arnie Risen (14)	Bob Davies (10)	Edgerton Park Arena; 4,200	3–2
6	April 18	@ New York	L 73–80	Arnie Johnson (27)	Arnie Johnson (15)	Jack Coleman (8)	69th Regiment Armory; 4,500	3–3
7	April 21	New York	W 79–75	Arnie Risen (24)	Arnie Risen (13)	Jack Coleman (9)	Edgerton Park Arena; 4,200	4–3

1951 schedule

== NBA Finals ==
The Royals took Game 1 easily, 92–65, as Risen and Wanzer recorded 24 and 19 points. Rochester won Game 2 99–84, behind 24 points from Davies and 28 rebounds from Coleman. Three nights later, the finals shifted to the 69th Regiment Armory in New York, but the result was no different. The Royals defeated the Knicks 78–71 and took a 3–0 series lead, thanks to 27 points and 18 rebounds from Risen. The Knicks rebounded in Game 4 by a score of 79–73. The Knicks key player was Harry Gallatin who scored 22 points and 14 rebounds. Game 5 took place in Rochester and the Knicks won 92–89. Connie Simmons had 26 points; and then tied the series by taking Game 6 back in New York 80–73. Max Zaslofsky led the way with 23 points. The seventh and deciding game was held on April 21 back in Rochester. The Royals jumped to an early 14-point lead, but the Knicks came back. With 44 seconds left and the score tied at 75, Davies was fouled by the Knicks’ Dick McGuire and sunk two free throws. Rochester would go on to win the seventh game and the NBA Championship. Davies finished the game with 20 points, and Risen scored 24 points and 13 rebounds in the deciding game. Risen finished the series with averages of 21.7 points and 14.3 rebounds, Davies averaged 17 points and 5.3 assists, Wanzer 12.4 points and Coleman 13.1 rebounds. The Knicks remain the only time in NBA Finals history a team has bounced back from a 3–0 deficit to force a Game 7.

== Awards and honors ==
- Bob Davies, All-NBA First Team
