= Bill Calhoun (basketball) =

American basketball player (1927–2024)

Personal information
- Born: November 4, 1927 Tacoma, Washington, U.S.
- Died: December 17, 2024 (aged 97)
- Listed height: 6 ft 5 in (1.96 m)
- Listed weight: 180 lb (82 kg)

Career information
- High school: Lowell (San Francisco, California)
- College: CC of San Francisco (1945–1946)
- Playing career: 1947–1955
- Position: Shooting guard / small forward
- Number: 19, 5, 10, 3

Career history
- 1947–1952: Rochester Royals
- 1951–1952: Baltimore Bullets
- 1952–1955: Milwaukee Hawks

Career highlights
- NBA champion (1951)

Career NBA statistics
- Points: 3,440
- Rebounds: 1,292
- Assists: 1,036
- Stats at NBA.com
- Stats at Basketball Reference

William Carl Calhoun (November 4, 1927 – December 17, 2024) was an American professional basketball player who played eight seasons in the Basketball Association of America (BAA) and National Basketball Association (NBA).

== Life and career ==
Born in Tacoma, Washington and raised in San Francisco, California, Calhoun played collegiately for the City College of San Francisco from 1945 to 1946.

He played with the Rochester Royals (1947–51), Baltimore Bullets (1951–52), and Milwaukee Hawks (1952–55) in the NBL, BAA and NBA.

Calhoun died on December 17, 2024, at the age of 97.

== BAA/NBA career statistics ==
Legend
GP	Games played	GS	Games started	MPG	Minutes per game
FG%	Field goal percentage	3P%	3-point field goal percentage	FT%	Free throw percentage
RPG	Rebounds per game	APG	Assists per game	SPG	Steals per game
BPG	Blocks per game	PPG	Points per game	**Bold**	Career high
†	Won an NBA championship

=== Regular season ===
Year	Team	GP	MPG	FG%	FT%	RPG	APG	PPG
1948–49	Rochester	56	–	.358	.573	–	2.2	6.6
1949–50	Rochester	62	–	**.377**	.719	–	1.9	9.0
1950–51†	Rochester	66	–	.346	.706	3.0	1.5	7.7
1951–52	Baltimore	55	29.0	.315	.683	4.6	2.1	7.0
1952–53	Syracuse	13	18.4	.291	.711	2.1	1.2	4.9
1952–53	Milwaukee	49	**39.0**	.342	.725	**5.1**	2.9	**10.3**
1953–54	Milwaukee	**72**	32.9	.349	**.733**	3.8	2.6	8.3
1954–55	Milwaukee	69	30.6	.300	.703	4.2	**3.4**	6.6
Career		442	31.9	.341	.702	4.0	2.3	7.8

=== Playoffs ===
Year	Team	GP	MPG	FG%	FT%	RPG	APG	PPG
1949	Rochester	4	–	**.433**	.722	–	**3.5**	**9.8**
1951†	Rochester	**14**	–	.423	**.739**	**2.9**	1.4	4.4
Career		18	–	.423	.739	2.9	1.9	5.6
