= Joe McNamee =

American basketball player

Personal information
- Born: September 24, 1926 San Francisco, California, U.S.
- Died: July 16, 2011 (aged 84) Greenbrae, California, U.S.
- Listed height: 6 ft 6 in (1.98 m)
- Listed weight: 210 lb (95 kg)

Career information
- High school: Saint Ignatius (San Francisco, California)
- College: San Francisco (1946–1950)
- NBA draft: 1950: 1st round, 9th overall pick
- Drafted by: Rochester Royals
- Playing career: 1950–1952
- Position: Power forward / center
- Number: 20, 13

Career history
- 1950–1951: Rochester Royals
- 1951–1952: Baltimore Bullets

Career highlights
- NBA champion (1951)

Career statistics
- Points: 289 (2.4 ppg)
- Rebounds: 238 (2.5) rpg)
- Assists: 58 (0.5 apg)
- Stats at NBA.com
- Stats at Basketball Reference

John Joseph McNamee (September 24, 1926 – July 16, 2011) was an American professional basketball player.

A 6′6″ forward/center from the University of San Francisco, McNamee played two seasons (1950–1952) in the National Basketball Association as a member of the Rochester Royals and Baltimore Bullets. He averaged 2.4 points per game in his career and won a league championship with Rochester in 1951. Joe went on to have a long and successful career in sales for Watson and Meehan, a distributor of Cummins engines. Joe and his wife Alice had eight kids (Sharon, John, Pattie, Casey, Dennis, Peter, Steve and Jim) and 11 grandchildren.

== Career statistics ==
Legend
| GP | Games played | GS | Games started | MPG | Minutes per game |
| FG% | Field goal percentage | 3P% | 3-point field goal percentage | FT% | Free throw percentage |
| RPG | Rebounds per game | APG | Assists per game | SPG | Steals per game |
| BPG | Blocks per game | PPG | Points per game | **Bold** | Career high |
| † | Won an NBA championship |

=== NBA ===
==== Regular season ====
| Year | Team | GP | MPG | FG% | FT% | RPG | APG | PPG |
|---|---|---|---|---|---|---|---|---|
| 1950–51† | Rochester | **60** | | .287 | **.643** | 1.7 | .3 | 2.1 |
| 1951–52 | Rochester | 24 | 4.9 | .194 | .333 | 1.0 | .1 | .6 |
| 1951–52 | Baltimore | 34 | **17.0** | **.325** | .636 | **3.3** | **1.1** | **4.5** |
| Career | | 118 | 12.0 | .298 | .620 | 2.0 | .5 | 2.4 |

==== Playoffs ====
| Year | Team | GP | FG% | FT% | RPG | APG | PPG |
|---|---|---|---|---|---|---|---|
| 1951† | Rochester | 13 | .293 | .750 | 2.7 | .7 | 2.5 |
