= Harry Gallatin =

American basketball player and coach (1927–2015)

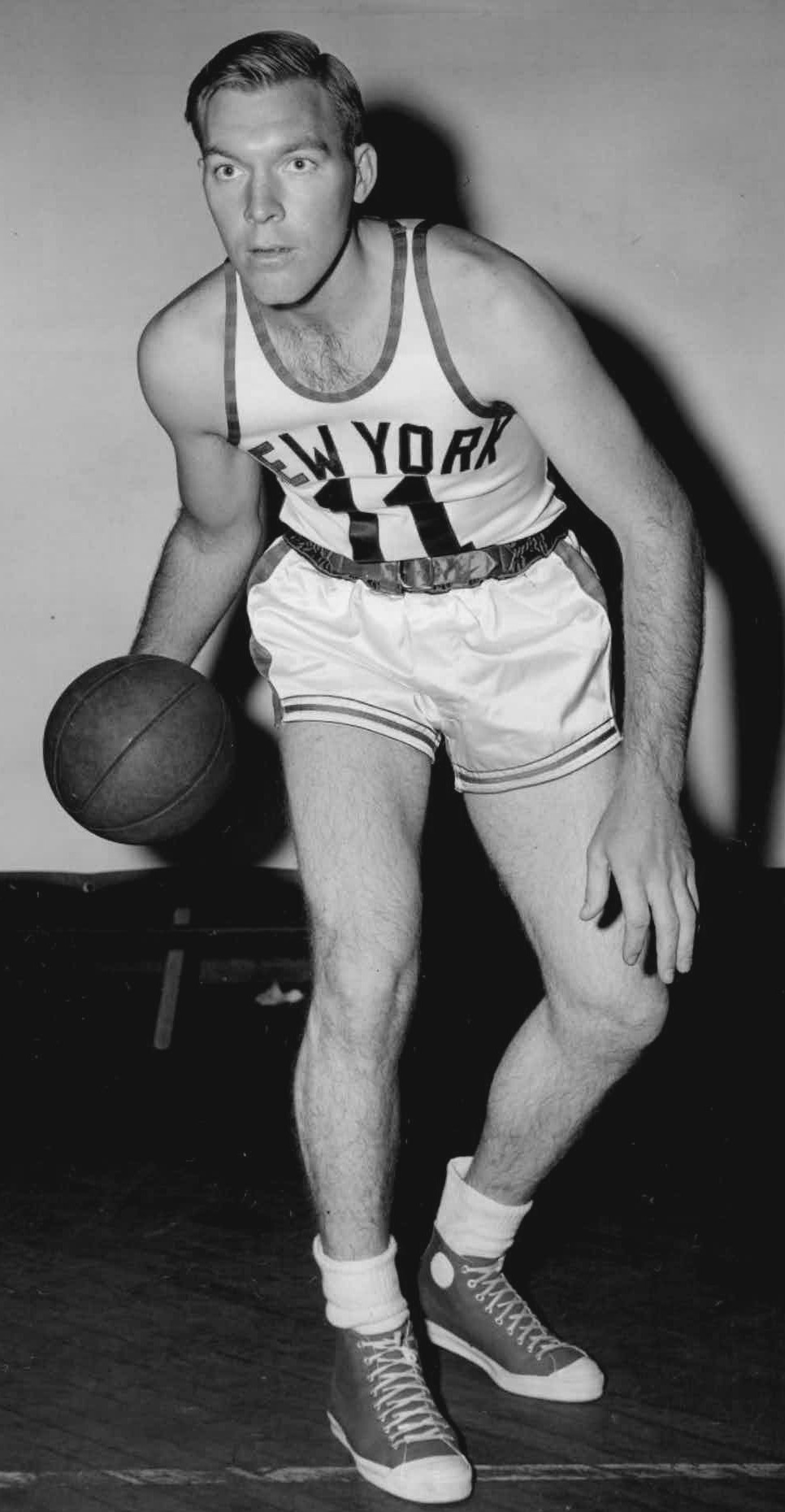

Personal information
- Born: April 26, 1927 Roxana, Illinois, U.S.
- Died: October 7, 2015 (aged 88) Edwardsville, Illinois, U.S.
- Listed height: 6 ft 6 in (1.98 m)
- Listed weight: 210 lb (95 kg)

Career information
- High school: Roxana (Roxana, Illinois)
- College: Truman (1946–1948)
- BAA draft: 1948: – 4th round, – 40 overall
- Drafted by: New York Knicks
- Playing career: 1948–1958
- Position: Power forward / center
- Number: 11, 10

Career history

Playing
- 1948–1957: New York Knicks
- 1957–1958: Detroit Pistons

Career highlights
- As player: 7× NBA All-Star (1951–1957); All-NBA First Team (1954); All-NBA Second Team (1955); NBA rebounding leader (1954); As coach: NBA Coach of the Year (1963)

Career BAA / NBA statistics
- Points: 8,843 (13.0 ppg)
- Rebounds: 6,684 (11.9 rpg)
- Assists: 1,208 (1.8 apg)
- Stats at NBA.com
- Stats at Basketball Reference
- Basketball Hall of Fame
- Collegiate Basketball Hall of Fame

Harry Junior "The Horse" Gallatin (April 26, 1927 – October 7, 2015) was an American professional basketball player and coach. Gallatin played nine seasons for the New York Knicks in the National Basketball Association (NBA) from 1948 to 1957, as well as one season with the Detroit Pistons in the 1957–58 season. Gallatin led the NBA in rebounding and was named to the All-NBA First Team in 1954. The following year, he was named to the All-NBA Second Team. For his career, Gallatin played in seven NBA All-Star Games. A member of the Naismith Memorial Basketball Hall of Fame, he is also a member of the National Collegiate Basketball Hall of Fame, the SIU Edwardsville Athletics Hall of Fame, the Truman State University Athletics Hall of Fame, the Missouri Sports Hall of Fame, two Illinois Basketball Halls of Fame, the Mid-America Intercollegiate Athletics Association (MIAA) Hall of Fame, the National Association of Intercollegiate Athletics (NAIA) Hall of Fame, and the SIU Salukis Hall of Fame.

== Early life ==
Harry Junior "The Horse" Gallatin was born on April 26, 1927, in Roxana, Illinois, where he grew up. Gallatin had taken interest in all sports and has been quoted as saying, "Competition has always been my cup of tea." His drive for competition was amplified during his first year in high school as he attended Wood River High School from 1940 to 1941. Since Roxana and some other outlying communities like Bethalto had no high school of their own at the time, all the athletes in the area attended Wood River, thus increasing the level of competition among them for varsity positions. The following year, however, Roxana got its own high school. He graduated from Roxana High School in 1944, and was granted a basketball scholarship by Northeast Missouri State Teachers' College (now known as Truman State University). But after graduating from Roxana High School, he enlisted in the United States Navy and served until the end of World War II.

== College career ==
At Northeast Missouri, Gallatin averaged 12.9 points per game and lead his team to a 59–4 record and two appearances in the NAIA tournament. He earned his bachelor's degree from Northeast Missouri in only two years and would later receive his master's degree in physical education from the University of Iowa in 1954.

== Professional basketball career ==
On July 1, 1947, Gallatin was drafted by the Baltimore Bullets in the 4th round of the 1947 BAA Draft.

=== New York Knicks (1948–1957) ===
On May 10, 1948, the New York Knicks selected Gallatin in the 1948 BAA draft. "It was a dream come true. I really didn't know what to expect; it was my first plane ride, from St. Louis to New York. Here I am a boy from Wood River, a country boy, and going to the Big Apple", Gallatin explained. "All I knew was that I loved to play basketball, and the Knicks had taken me with their number one choice. So I knew that they thought I had the kind of abilities they were looking for."

On March 21, 1949, Gallatin was drafted by the New York Knicks in the 2nd round (20th pick) of the 1949 BAA Draft.

In his third year in the NBA, Gallatin was selected for the first NBA All-Star Game in 1951, and from 1951 to 1957 was chosen for seven consecutive NBA All-Star games. It was in the NBA where he earned the nickname "The Horse". He played his entire career as an undersized center at 6'6" and 215 lbs., but made up for it with tremendous physical strength. He played nine seasons for the New York Knicks, from 1948 to 1957. His best statistical year was in 1954, when he led the NBA in rebounding, averaging 15.3 rebounds per game. That same year, he was also named to the All-NBA First Team. His most dominating single-game performance was on the last regular season game of the 1952–53 season. That night, against the Fort Wayne Pistons, Gallatin pulled down 33 rebounds, a Knicks record which still stands today. In the six seasons he played when rebounds were recorded, he was among the leaders in the league in rebounds per game. For his career, he averaged 11.9 rebounds per game. Gallatin still holds the Knick team record of consecutive games played, with 610.

=== Detroit Pistons (1957–1958) ===
After nine strong years with the Knicks, Gallatin was traded to the Detroit Pistons with Richard Atha and Nathaniel Clifton for Mel Hutchins and Charlie Tyra on April 3, 1957. He played only one season for the Pistons before retiring as one of the most dominating post players of his era.

== Professional baseball career ==
=== Minor leagues ===
In addition to basketball, Gallatin also played baseball. He played two seasons of varsity baseball at Northeast Missouri. During the off-seasons between his first three seasons in the NBA, he played for the Class B Decatur, Illinois Cubs/Commodores of the Illinois–Indiana–Iowa League, which was an affiliate of the Chicago Cubs in 1949 and the Cincinnati Reds in 1950. He appeared in 46 games in those two seasons, winning 7, losing 9 and batting .227 in 75 at-bats. After the 1950 baseball season, however, he made basketball his only professional sport.

== Coaching career ==
=== Southern Illinois (1958–1962) ===
After his retirement from playing in 1958, Gallatin became the head coach of the Southern Illinois University Salukis. In four seasons there, he led his teams to a 69–35 record and post-season tournament appearances every year. The 1961–62 team made it to the NCAA Small College (now Division II) Tournament semifinals before barely losing to eventual champion Mount St. Mary's College 58–57, then took third place by beating Nebraska Wesleyan University 98–81.

=== St. Louis Hawks (1962–1965) ===
Gallatin returned to the NBA in 1962 as coach of the St. Louis Hawks. In his first season, he led the Hawks to the division finals and was named NBA Coach of the Year. The 1963–64 season saw the Hawks again advance to the division finals. The eighth coach since the franchise's arrival in St. Louis in 1955, he was fired on December 28, 1964, despite the Hawks being in second place in the NBA Western Division. He was replaced by Richie Guerin.

=== New York Knicks (1965–1966) ===
Gallatin returned to New York to coach the Knicks which were developing into a championship team, but the pieces were not yet all in place and Gallatin left the Knicks and the NBA midway through the 1965–66 season.

=== SIU Edwardsville (1967–1970) ===
Gallatin became Assistant Dean of Students at Southern Illinois University Edwardsville in 1966, then the first athletic director and basketball coach in 1967. He remained at SIUE until his retirement in 1992, where he also taught in the physical education department and was the SIUE Cougars's men's golf coach for 24 years, leading that team to qualify for the NCAA Division II championships 18 times and finish in the top 10 six times.

After his retirement from coaching, Gallatin remained active and enthusiastic, while continuing to live in Edwardsville, Illinois. He was inducted into the Naismith Memorial Basketball Hall of Fame in 1991, and was also named to nine other Halls of Fame. In 2011, the New York Knicks honored him in their second "Legends Night Awards" along with other former Knicks stars Dick Barnett, Earl Monroe, Mark Jackson, John Starks and Allan Houston, and in May 2015, the Knicks added him to Madison Square Garden's Walk of Fame.

== Death ==
Harry Gallatin died on October 7, 2015, following surgery. He was survived by Beverly Hull Gallatin, his wife since 1949; their sons, Steve, Jim, and Bill; his sister, Eileen Palmer; eight grandchildren; and six great-grandchildren.

== Legacy ==
On June 24, 2013, Gallatin took part as the SIUE athletics department broke ground for a new golf training facility. Following approval by the SIU Board of Trustees, it was officially named the Harry Gallatin Golf Training Facility. The facility, initially proposed as an on-campus venue, was moved when Sunset Hills Country Club (SHCC) in Edwardsville.offered to partner in the endeavor. The approximately $500,000, 1,840-square-foot facility was opened to SIUE students and SHCC members on December 10, 2019.

== BAA/NBA career statistics ==
Legend
GP	Games played	GS	Games started	MPG	Minutes per game
FG%	Field goal percentage	3P%	3-point field goal percentage	FT%	Free throw percentage
RPG	Rebounds per game	APG	Assists per game	SPG	Steals per game
BPG	Blocks per game	PPG	Points per game	**Bold**	Career high
*	Led the league

=== Regular season ===
Year	Team	GP	MPG	FG%	FT%	RPG	APG	PPG
1948–49	New York	52	–	.328	.710	–	1.2	8.3
1949–50	New York	68	–	.396	.757	–	0.8	11.8
1950–51	New York	66	–	.416	.732	12.1	2.7	12.8
1951–52	New York	66	29.3	.442	.806	10.0	**3.4**	11.2
1952–53	New York	70	33.3	**.444**	.700	13.1	1.8	12.4
1953–54	New York	**72**	**37.4**	.404	.784	**15.3***	2.1	13.2
1954–55	New York	**72**	35.4	.384	**.814**	13.8	2.4	14.6
1955–56	New York	**72**	33.0	.386	.787	10.3	2.3	13.9
1956–57	New York	**72**	27.0	.406	.800	10.1	1.2	**15.0**
1957–58	Detroit	**72**	27.6	.379	.787	10.4	1.2	14.9
Career		682	31.9	.398	.773	11.9	1.8	13.0

=== Playoffs ===
Year	Team	GP	MPG	FG%	FT%	RPG	APG	PPG
1949	New York	6	–	.357	**.821**	–	1.7	12.0
1950	New York	5	–	.385	.781	–	1.2	13.0
1951	New York	**14**	–	.350	.770	11.6	1.9	11.8
1952	New York	**14**	33.6	.410	.773	9.6	1.4	10.8
1953	New York	11	27.5	.419	.746	10.9	1.4	10.5
1954	New York	4	**37.8**	**.457**	.710	**15.3**	1.5	13.5
1955	New York	3	36.0	.452	.773	14.7	**2.3**	**18.3**
1958	Detroit	7	26.0	.368	.703	10.0	1.6	12.9
Career		64	31.2	.390	.761	11.2	1.6	12.0

== Head coaching record ==
=== NBA ===
Legend
Regular season	G	Games coached	W	Games won	L	Games lost	W–L %	Win–loss %
Playoffs	PG	Playoff games	PW	Playoff wins	PL	Playoff losses	PW–L %	Playoff win–loss %

Team	Year	G	W	L	W–L%	Finish	PG	PW	PL	PW–L%	Result
St. Louis Hawks	1962–63	80	48	32	.600	2nd in West	11	6	5	.545	Lost in Division finals
St. Louis Hawks	1963–64	80	46	34	.575	2nd in West	12	6	6	.500	Lost in Division finals
St. Louis Hawks	1964–65	33	17	16	.515	-	-	-	-	-	-
New York Knicks	1964–65	42	19	23	.452	-	-	-	-	-	-
New York Knicks	1965–66	21	6	15	.286	—	—	—	—	—	—
Career total		256	136	120	.531		23	12	11	.511	

=== College ===
Record table
Season	Team	Overall	Conference	Standing	Postseason
Southern Illinois Salukis (Interstate Intercollegiate Athletic Conference) (1958–1962)
1958–59	Southern Illinois	17–10	9–3	2nd	NCAA College Division Regional Third Place
1959–60	Southern Illinois	20–9	9–3	T–1st	NAIA First Round
1960–61	Southern Illinois	21–6	12–0	1st	NCAA College Division Regional Runner-up
1961–62	Southern Illinois	21–10	9–3	1st	NCAA College Division Third Place
Southern Illinois:		79–35	39–9		
SIU Edwardsville Cougars (NCAA College Division independent) (1967–1970)
1967–68	SIU Edwardsville	5–5			
1968–69	SIU Edwardsville	7–10			
1969–70	SIU Edwardsville	7–16			
SIU Edwardsville:		19–31			
Total:		58–40			
National champion Postseason invitational champion Conference regular season champion Conference regular season and conference tournament champion Division regular season champion Division regular season and conference tournament champion Conference tournament champion

== See also ==
- List of National Basketball Association annual rebounding leaders
