= 1950–51 Boston Celtics season =

NBA basketball team season

- Head coach: Red Auerbach
- Arena: Boston Arena; Boston Garden

Results
- Record: 39–30 (.565)
- Place: Division: 2nd (Eastern)
- Playoff finish: East Division Semi-finals (lost to Knicks 0–2)
- Stats at Basketball Reference
- Radio: WHDH

The 1950–51 Boston Celtics season was the fifth season of the Boston Celtics in the National Basketball Association (NBA). It was Red Auerbach's first season as the legendary head coach for the Boston Celtics after previously being the head coach for the Washington Capitols in the old Basketball Association of America and the brief majority of time spent for the previous NBA season under the Tri-Cities Blackhawks. This was also the first winning season in franchise history, finishing 9 games above .500, beginning a streak of 19 consecutive winning seasons. They also qualified for the playoffs for the second time in franchise history, starting a streak of 19 consecutive postseason appearances as well. One lesser known aspect that's not mentioned during this season was how two out of three games successfully rigged by NBA referee Sol Levy involved the Celtics winning two matches against the Washington Capitols (who would become defunct later in the season) and Indianapolis Olympians on November 11 & 12 respectively, with the latter game in particular catching Levy in the act and later resulting in his arrest as an accomplice in the CCNY point-shaving scandal of 1951.

== Draft picks ==
Round	Pick	Player	Position	Nationality	College
1	1	Chuck Share	C	United States	Bowling Green
2	12	Chuck Cooper	F	United States	Duquesne
3	24	Bob Donham	G/F	United States	Ohio State
6	60	Francis Mahoney	F	United States	Brown

== Roster ==
1950–51 Boston Celtics roster
Players

Pos.	No.	Player	Height	Weight	DOB	From
C	24	Harry Boykoff	6 ft 10 in (2.08 m)	225 lb (102 kg)		St. John's
F	11	Chuck Cooper	6 ft 5 in (1.96 m)	210 lb (95 kg)		Duquesne
G	14	Bob Cousy	6 ft 1 in (1.85 m)	175 lb (79 kg)		Holy Cross
G/F	12	Bob Donham	6 ft 2 in (1.88 m)	190 lb (86 kg)		Ohio State
F/C	21	Andy Duncan	6 ft 6 in (1.98 m)	195 lb (88 kg)		William & Mary
F/C	13−18	Bob Harris	6 ft 7 in (2.01 m)	195 lb (88 kg)		Oklahoma State
F/C	10	Kleggie Hermsen	6 ft 9 in (2.06 m)	225 lb (102 kg)		Minnesota
G	4	Sonny Hertzberg	5 ft 10 in (1.78 m)	175 lb (79 kg)		CCNY
G/F	21	Frank Kudelka	6 ft 2 in (1.88 m)	193 lb (88 kg)		Saint Mary's
G/F	5	Ed Leede	6 ft 3 in (1.91 m)	185 lb (84 kg)		Dartmouth
F/C	22	Ed Macauley	6 ft 8 in (2.03 m)	185 lb (84 kg)		Saint Louis
C	16	John Mahnken	6 ft 8 in (2.03 m)	220 lb (100 kg)		Georgetown
F/C	17	Bones McKinney	6 ft 6 in (1.98 m)	185 lb (84 kg)		North Carolina
F/C		Dick Mehen	6 ft 5 in (1.96 m)	195 lb (88 kg)		Tennessee
G	13	Kenny Sailors	5 ft 10 in (1.78 m)	175 lb (79 kg)		Wyoming
F	19−21	Ed Stanczak	6 ft 1 in (1.85 m)	185 lb (84 kg)		Central High School (IN)
F/C	13	Brady Walker	6 ft 6 in (1.98 m)	205 lb (93 kg)		BYU

Coaches
Head coach
- Red Auerbach

Legend
- (DP) Unsigned draft pick
- (FA) Free agent
- (S) Suspended
- Injured

Roster
Updated: 2011-03-14

== Pre-season ==
1950 Pre-season game log: 5–0 (home: 5–0)
#	Date	Visitor	Score	Home	OT	Attendance	Record	Recap
1	October 18 (in Bangor, Maine)	Baltimore Bullets	92–102	Boston Celtics			1–0
2	October 19 (in Houlton, Maine)	Baltimore Bullets	90–100	Boston Celtics		1,900	2–0
3	October 22 (in Burlington, Vermont)	Baltimore Bullets	60–72	Boston Celtics			3–0
4	October 23 (in Newport, New Hampshire)	Baltimore Bullets	66–86	Boston Celtics			4–0
5	October 30	Baltimore Bullets	83–98	Boston Celtics			5–0

== Regular season ==
=== Season standings ===
Eastern Division	W	L	PCT	GB	Home	Road	Neutral	Div
x-Philadelphia Warriors	40	26	.606	–	28–4	11–21	1–1	22–14
x-Boston Celtics	39	30	.565	1	25–5	10–23	4–2	21–19
x-New York Knicks	36	30	.545	4	22–5	10–25	4–0	21–15
x-Syracuse Nationals	32	34	.485	8	23–10	9–24	–	19–17
Baltimore Bullets	24	42	.364	16	20–12	4–24	0–6	12–24
Washington Capitols†	10	25	.286	30	7–12	3–12	0–1	6–12

=== Game log ===
1950–51 game log
#	Date	Opponent	Score	High points	Record
1	November 1	at Fort Wayne	84–107	Bob Cousy (16)	0–1
2	November 2	at Tri-Cities	65–79	Ed Macauley (22)	0–2
3	November 4	at Philadelphia	68–77	Ed Macauley (19)	0–3
4	November 7	vs Baltimore	83–64	Bob Donham (15)	1–3
5	November 9	Minneapolis	76–71	Ed Macauley (22)	2–3
6	November 11	at Washington	78–77	Ed Macauley (24)	3–3
7	November 12	Indianapolis	78–75	Ed Macauley (19)	4–3
8	November 15	vs Washington	79–74	Chuck Cooper (15)	5–3
9	November 16	Baltimore	82–73	Ed Macauley (26)	6–3
10	November 18	at Baltimore	80–76	Ed Macauley (16)	7–3
11	November 19	Washington	75–81	Cousy, Macauley (23)	7–4
12	November 21	at New York	89–83	Cooper, Macauley (18)	8–4
13	November 23	Tri-Cities	94–78	Ed Macauley (23)	9–4
14	November 25	at Rochester	82–90	Ed Leede (19)	9–5
15	November 26	New York	93–90 (2OT)	Ed Macauley (26)	10–5
16	November 28	vs Philadelphia	74–76	Sidney Hertzberg (19)	10–6
17	November 30	Washington	81–85	Sidney Hertzberg (22)	10–7
18	December 2	at Washington	83–75	Ed Macauley (22)	11–7
19	December 3	Baltimore	97–85	Bob Cousy (22)	12–7
20	December 9	Syracuse	85–86	Cousy, Macauley (19)	12–8
21	December 12	Fort Wayne	87–81	Ed Macauley (25)	13–8
22	December 13	at Washington	79–110	Ed Macauley (19)	13–9
23	December 16	at Baltimore	88–119	Bob Cousy (28)	13–10
24	December 17	Rochester	88–75	Bob Cousy (25)	14–10
25	December 19	vs New York	80–86	Ed Macauley (23)	14–11
26	December 23	Minneapolis	87–81	Ed Macauley (23)	15–11
27	December 25	at Rochester	77–90	Ed Macauley (23)	15–12
28	December 26	Syracuse	102–100	Ed Macauley (24)	16–12
29	December 30	at New York	60–77	Bob Cousy (19)	16–13
30	December 31	New York	100–90	Ed Macauley (33)	17–13
31	January 1	at Syracuse	89–106	Ed Macauley (14)	17–14
32	January 3	at Tri-Cities	84–82	Ed Macauley (28)	18–14
33	January 5	at Minneapolis	54–69	Cousy, Hertzberg, Macauley (13)	18–15
34	January 7	Washington	91–86 (OT)	Ed Macauley (25)	19–15
35	January 13	at Philadelphia	97–87	Bob Cousy (34)	20–15
36	January 14	Philadelphia	98–73	Macauley, Mahnken (18)	21–15
37	January 18	Tri-Cities	105–85	Ed Macauley (25)	22–15
38	January 20	at Tri-Cities	85–91	Bob Cousy (16)	22–16
39	January 21	at Fort Wayne	112–106 (OT)	Ed Macauley (22)	23–16
40	January 23	at Indianapolis	83–79 (OT)	Ed Macauley (21)	24–16
41	January 25	Fort Wayne	99–97	Leede, Macauley (19)	25–16
42	January 27	at New York	75–76	Bob Cousy (17)	25–17
43	January 28	at Syracuse	83–104	Bob Cousy (20)	25–18
44	January 30	Syracuse	96–87	Cousy, Macauley (23)	26–18
45	February 1	at Philadelphia	80–82 (2OT)	Ed Macauley (26)	26–19
46	February 2	Syracuse	96–90 (OT)	Ed Macauley (22)	27–19
47	February 4	at Minneapolis	84–98	Kleggie Hermsen (23)	27–20
48	February 5	vs Indianapolis	70–57	Kleggie Hermsen (16)	28–20
49	February 8	Tri-Cities	85–70	Bob Cousy (19)	29–20
50	February 10	at Baltimore	76–81	Ed Macauley (21)	29–21
51	February 11	Rochester	93–77	Ed Macauley (29)	30–21
52	February 13	at Philadelphia	98–104	Ed Macauley (32)	30–22
53	February 15	at Syracuse	80–94	Bob Cousy (19)	30–23
54	February 16	Philadelphia	81–76	Ed Macauley (26)	31–23
55	February 18	Indianapolis	78–75	Ed Macauley (24)	32–23
56	February 21	New York	87–85 (OT)	Ed Macauley (36)	33–23
57	February 22	vs Baltimore	72–69	Ed Macauley (17)	34–23
58	February 24	at Baltimore	75–84	Sidney Hertzberg (18)	34–24
59	February 25	Philadelphia	93–83	Bob Cousy (39)	35–24
60	March 1	New York	78–84	Ed Macauley (24)	35–25
61	March 3	at Baltimore	95–87	Ed Macauley (21)	36–25
62	March 4	Minneapolis	92–86	Bob Cousy (19)	37–25
63	March 6	at Indianapolis	73–75	Bob Cousy (19)	37–26
64	March 7	at Fort Wayne	99–95	Ed Macauley (26)	38–26
65	March 11	at Minneapolis	96–98 (2OT)	Ed Macauley (26)	38–27
66	March 13	Rochester	107–111 (2OT)	Bob Cousy (32)	38–28
67	March 16	Fort Wayne	90–88	Ed Macauley (27)	39–28
68	March 17	at Rochester	89–114	Ed Macauley (16)	39–29
69	March 18	at Syracuse	89–97	Bob Cousy (28)	39–30

== Playoffs ==
1951 playoff game log
Division Semi-finals: 0–2 (home: 0–1; road: 0–1)

Game	Date	Team	Score	High points	High assists	Location	Series
1	March 20	New York	L 69–83	Ed Macauley (23)	—	Boston Garden	0–1
2	March 22	@ New York	L 78–92	Ed Macauley (21)	Bob Cousy (6)	Madison Square Garden III	0–2

1951 schedule

== Awards and records ==
- Ed Macauley, All-NBA First Team

== See also ==
- 1950–51 NBA season
