= Vince Boryla =

American basketball player, coach, and executive (1927–2016)

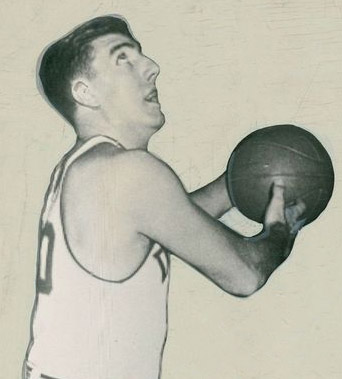

Personal information
- Born: March 11, 1927 East Chicago, Indiana, U.S.
- Died: March 27, 2016 (aged 89) Denver, Colorado, U.S.
- Listed height: 6 ft 5 in (1.96 m)
- Listed weight: 210 lb (95 kg)

Career information
- High school: Washington (East Chicago, Indiana)
- College: Notre Dame (1944–1946); Denver (1948–1949)
- Playing career: 1949–1954
- Position: Forward
- Number: 19, 12

Career history

Playing
- 1949–1954: New York Knicks

Coaching
- 1955–1958: New York Knicks

Career highlights
- As player: NBA All-Star (1951); Consensus first-team All-American (1949); Second-team All-American – True (1946); As executive: NBA Executive of the Year (1985)
- Stats at NBA.com
- Stats at Basketball Reference
Medals
Men's basketball
Representing the United States
| Gold medal – first place | 1948 London | Team competition |

Vincent Joseph Boryla (March 11, 1927 – March 27, 2016) was an American basketball player, coach and executive. His nickname was "Moose". He graduated from East Chicago Washington High School in 1944. He played basketball at the University of Notre Dame and the University of Denver, where he was named a consensus All-American in 1949. Boryla was part of the U.S. team that won the gold medal at the 1948 Summer Olympics in London.

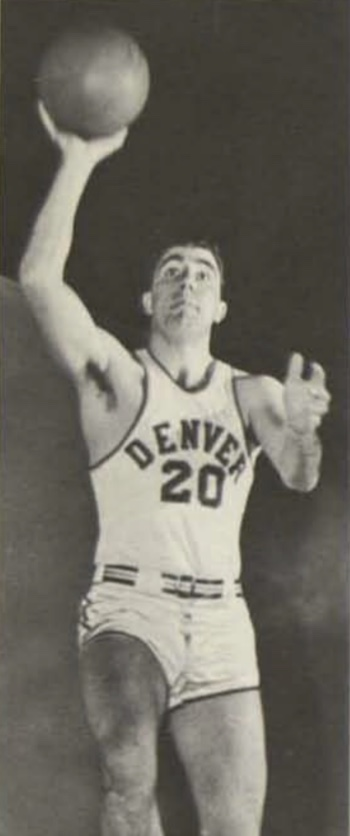
Boryla as a senior at Denver

Boryla played for the New York Knicks in the early 1950s. In 1951, Boryla scored nine points in the inaugural NBA All-Star Game and played in the NBA Finals in 1951 and 1953. Boryla did not participate in the 1952 playoffs. He later became the Knicks' coach from 1956 to 1958, and had an 80–85 record with them.

Later in his career, Boryla became the general manager of the American Basketball Association's Denver Nuggets early in their history when they were first the Kansas City ABA team and then the Denver Larks. He was also the general manager of the ABA's Utah Stars, where the team won the 1971 ABA Championship under his management. Boryla later rejoined the Nuggets when the franchise joined the NBA. He won the NBA Executive of the Year Award with the Nuggets in 1985.

His son Mike was a quarterback in the National Football League; Vince served as his agent.

Boryla was inducted into the Indiana Basketball Hall of Fame, and in 1984 into the National Polish-American Hall of Fame. Boryla died in Denver, Colorado, on March 27, 2016, from complications of pneumonia, aged 89.

== NBA career statistics ==
Legend
| GP | Games played | GS | Games started | MPG | Minutes per game |
| FG% | Field goal percentage | 3P% | 3-point field goal percentage | FT% | Free throw percentage |
| RPG | Rebounds per game | APG | Assists per game | SPG | Steals per game |
| BPG | Blocks per game | PPG | Points per game | **Bold** | Career high |

=== Regular season ===
| Year | Team | GP | MPG | FG% | FT% | RPG | APG | PPG |
|---|---|---|---|---|---|---|---|---|
| 1949–50 | New York | 59 | – | .340 | .764 | – | 1.6 | 10.4 |
| 1950–51 | New York | **66** | – | **.406** | .837 | 3.8 | **2.8** | **14.9** |
| 1951–52 | New York | 42 | **34.3** | .387 | .835 | **5.2** | 2.1 | 11.9 |
| 1952–53 | New York | **66** | 33.3 | .370 | .821 | 3.5 | 2.5 | 10.2 |
| 1953–54 | New York | 52 | 29.3 | .333 | **.864** | 2.5 | 1.5 | 8.1 |
| Career | | 285 | 32.3 | .371 | .816 | 3.7 | 2.1 | 11.2 |
| All-Star | | 1 | – | .667 | 1.000 | 2.0 | 2.0 | 9.0 |

=== Playoffs ===
| Year | Team | GP | MPG | FG% | FT% | RPG | APG | PPG |
|---|---|---|---|---|---|---|---|---|
| 1950 | New York | 5 | – | .442 | .906 | – | 1.4 | 15.0 |
| 1951 | New York | **14** | – | .430 | **.911** | **3.7** | **2.6** | **15.5** |
| 1953 | New York | 11 | **36.1** | .379 | .853 | 3.2 | 1.8 | 10.6 |
| 1954 | New York | 3 | 22.0 | **.571** | .846 | 0.7 | 0.3 | 9.0 |
| Career | | 33 | 33.1 | .421 | .889 | 3.2 | 2.0 | 13.2 |

== Head coaching record ==
| Team | Year | G | W | L | W–L% | Finish | PG | PW | PL | PW–L% | Result |
|---|---|---|---|---|---|---|---|---|---|---|---|
| New York | 1955–56 | 21 | 9 | 12 | .429 | 4th in Eastern | — | — | — | — | Missed playoffs |
| New York | 1956–57 | 72 | 36 | 36 | .500 | 4th in Eastern | — | — | — | — | Missed playoffs |
| New York | 1957–58 | 72 | 35 | 37 | .486 | 4th in Eastern | — | — | — | — | Missed playoffs |
| Career | | 165 | 80 | 85 | .485 | | 0 | 0 | 0 | – | |
