= Jack Coleman (basketball) =

American basketball player

Personal information
- Born: May 23, 1924 Burgin, Kentucky, U.S.
- Died: December 11, 1998 (aged 74) Burgin, Kentucky, U.S.
- Listed height: 6 ft 7 in (2.01 m)
- Listed weight: 195 lb (88 kg)

Career information
- High school: Burgin (Burgin, Kentucky)
- College: Louisville (1946–1949)
- BAA draft: 1949: 2nd round
- Drafted by: Rochester Royals
- Playing career: 1949–1958
- Position: Power forward / center
- Number: 10, 15, 12, 11

Career history
- 1949–1956: Rochester Royals
- 1956–1958: St. Louis Hawks

Career highlights
- NBA: 2× NBA champion (1951, 1958); NBA All-Star (1955); College football: Third-team Little All-American (1946)

Career statistics
- Points: 6,721 (10.6 ppg)
- Rebounds: 5,186 (9.2 rpg)
- Assists: 1,749 (2.8 apg)
- Stats at NBA.com
- Stats at Basketball Reference

Jack Lillard Coleman (May 23, 1924 – December 11, 1998) was an American professional basketball player. After playing college basketball for the Louisville Cardinals, Coleman played in the National Basketball Association (NBA) for the Rochester Royals and St. Louis Hawks from 1949 through 1957.

== Career ==
A 6-foot-7-inch (2.01 m) power forward and center from the University of Louisville, Coleman played nine seasons (1949–1958) in the National Basketball Association as a member of the Rochester Royals and St. Louis Hawks. He tallied 6,721 points and 5,186 rebounds in his career, and he represented Rochester in the 1955 NBA All-Star Game. Coleman also appeared in three NBA Finals, winning championships with Rochester in 1951 and St. Louis in 1958.

During the Hawks' appearance in the 1957 NBA Finals, Coleman was involved in one of Bill Russell's most memorable defensive plays. In the final game of the series, Coleman had an opportunity to clinch the Hawks' championship with a layup after receiving an outlet pass at midcourt. Bill Russell, who had been standing at his own baseline when the play began, ran the entire length of the floor and managed to block Coleman's shot, preserving the victory for the Celtics. Celtics announcer Johnny Most screamed, "Blocked by Russell! Blocked by Russell! He came from nowhere!" The play has since gone down in history as the "Coleman Play." Coleman got some measure of revenge the following year when the Hawks reached the Finals again to play the Celtics. Coleman averaged eight points in the series while the Hawks defeated the Celtics in six games for their first championship; he scored eight points on three shots in his final game in Game 6. An efficient shooter, when Coleman retired, he was one of two players to have eight seasons with a field goal percentage over .400 in NBA history.

== Personal life ==
Coleman's son, also named Jack, served in the Kentucky House of Representatives in the 55th district from 1991 through 2004. His granddaughter Jacqueline is the current Lieutenant Governor of Kentucky.

== NBA career statistics ==
Legend
| GP | Games played | GS | Games started | MPG | Minutes per game |
| FG% | Field goal percentage | 3P% | 3-point field goal percentage | FT% | Free throw percentage |
| RPG | Rebounds per game | APG | Assists per game | SPG | Steals per game |
| BPG | Blocks per game | PPG | Points per game | **Bold** | Career high |
| † | Won an NBA championship |

=== Regular season ===
| Year | Team | GP | MPG | FG% | FT% | RPG | APG | PPG |
|---|---|---|---|---|---|---|---|---|
| 1949–50 | Rochester | 68 | – | .377 | .744 | – | 2.3 | 8.7 |
| 1950–51† | Rochester | 67 | – | .421 | **.779** | 8.7 | 2.9 | 11.4 |
| 1951–52 | Rochester | 66 | 39.5 | .415 | .710 | 10.5 | 3.2 | 11.2 |
| 1952–53 | Rochester | 70 | 37.5 | .420 | .649 | **11.1** | 3.3 | 10.9 |
| 1953–54 | Rochester | 71 | 33.5 | .405 | .597 | 8.3 | 2.2 | 9.7 |
| 1954–55 | Rochester | 72 | 34.5 | **.462** | .678 | 10.1 | 3.2 | 12.8 |
| 1955–56 | Rochester | **34** | **40.3** | .412 | .712 | 10.1 | **4.3** | **14.1** |
| 1955–56 | St. Louis | **41** | 33.4 | .412 | .710 | 8.4 | 3.6 | 11.7 |
| 1956–57 | St. Louis | 72 | 29.8 | .408 | .764 | 9.0 | 2.2 | 10.5 |
| 1957–58† | St. Louis | 72 | 20.9 | .413 | .641 | 6.7 | 1.6 | 7.6 |
| Career | | 633 | 33.1 | .416 | .695 | 9.2 | 2.8 | 10.6 |
| All-Star | | 1 | 19.0 | .250 | .667 | 6.0 | 1.0 | 6.0 |

=== Playoffs ===
| Year | Team | GP | MPG | FG% | FT% | RPG | APG | PPG |
|---|---|---|---|---|---|---|---|---|
| 1950 | Rochester | 2 | – | .350 | **1.000** | – | 2.0 | 7.5 |
| 1951† | Rochester | **14** | – | .396 | .732 | 12.8 | 4.7 | 10.0 |
| 1952 | Rochester | 6 | 41.2 | .407 | .611 | 12.2 | **5.8** | 9.8 |
| 1953 | Rochester | 3 | 36.7 | .292 | .800 | **13.3** | 2.3 | 7.3 |
| 1954 | Rochester | 6 | 39.7 | **.500** | .889 | 12.3 | 2.0 | 11.7 |
| 1955 | Rochester | 3 | 30.3 | .306 | .222 | 9.3 | 2.7 | 8.0 |
| 1956 | St. Louis | 8 | **41.4** | .393 | .629 | 9.9 | 4.0 | **13.8** |
| 1957 | St. Louis | 10 | 31.3 | .319 | .588 | 8.8 | 3.3 | 9.2 |
| 1958† | St. Louis | 11 | 22.1 | .427 | .575 | 5.5 | 1.7 | 9.0 |
| Career | | 63 | 33.5 | .385 | .646 | 10.2 | 3.4 | 10.0 |
