= Arnie Risen =

American basketball player

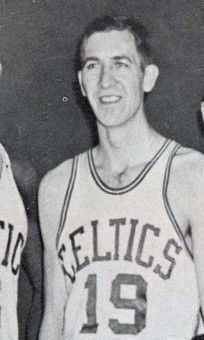
- Risen in 1957

Personal information
- Born: October 9, 1924 Williamstown, Kentucky, U.S.
- Died: August 4, 2012 (aged 87) Beachwood, Ohio, U.S.
- Listed height: 6 ft 9 in (2.06 m)
- Listed weight: 200 lb (91 kg)

Career information
- High school: Williamstown (Williamstown, Kentucky)
- College: Eastern Kentucky (1942–1943); Ohio State (1943–1945)
- Playing career: 1945–1958
- Position: Center
- Number: 14, 19

Career history
- 1945–1948: Indianapolis Kautskys
- 1948–1955: Rochester Royals
- 1955–1958: Boston Celtics

Career highlights
- 2× NBA champion (1951, 1957); 4× NBA All-Star (1952–1955); All-BAA Second Team (1949); All-NBL Second Team (1947); Second-team All-American – Helms, Converse (1945)

Career NBA statistics
- Points: 7,633
- Rebounds: 5,011
- Assists: 1,058
- Stats at NBA.com
- Stats at Basketball Reference
- Basketball Hall of Fame
- Collegiate Basketball Hall of Fame

Arnold Denny "Stilts" Risen (October 9, 1924 – August 4, 2012) was an American professional basketball player.

A 6-foot-9-inch (2.06 m) center, he led the Ohio State University Buckeyes to two straight Final Four appearances. Risen had transferred to Ohio State from Eastern Kentucky State Teacher's College.

Risen played professionally in the NBA for ten seasons (1948–1958) as a member of the Rochester Royals and Boston Celtics. Risen was a four-time All-Star and two-time NBA Champion, and he scored 7,633 points in his NBA career. He was elected to the Naismith Memorial Basketball Hall of Fame in 1998, Ohio State's Varsity "O" Hall of Fame in 2004, the College Basketball Hall of Fame in 2006, and the Ohio Basketball Hall of Fame in 2008. Because he settled in Beachwood, Ohio, after his professional career, he was also inducted into the Greater Cleveland Sports Hall of Fame in 2008.

Risen died in Beachwood on August 4, 2012, at the age of 87.

== BAA/NBA career statistics ==
Legend
GP	Games played	GS	Games started	MPG	Minutes per game
FG%	Field goal percentage	3P%	3-point field goal percentage	FT%	Free throw percentage
RPG	Rebounds per game	APG	Assists per game	SPG	Steals per game
BPG	Blocks per game	PPG	Points per game	**Bold**	Career high
†	Won an NBA championship	*	Led the league

=== Regular season ===
Year	Team	GP	MPG	FG%	FT%	RPG	APG	PPG
1948–49	Rochester	60	–	**.423***	.660	–	1.7	**16.6**
1949–50	Rochester	62	–	.344	.664	–	1.5	10.1
1950–51†	Rochester	66	–	.401	.734	12.0	**2.4**	16.3
1951–52	Rochester	66	**36.3**	.394	.701	**12.7**	2.3	15.6
1952–53	Rochester	68	33.6	.368	.685	11.0	2.0	13.0
1953–54	Rochester	**72**	33.1	.368	.714	10.1	1.7	13.2
1954–55	Rochester	69	28.6	.371	**.744**	10.2	1.6	11.6
1955–56	Boston	68	23.5	.383	.708	8.1	1.3	8.1
1956–57†	Boston	43	21.7	.388	.679	6.7	1.2	8.0
1957–58	Boston	63	17.8	.338	.683	5.7	0.8	6.1
Career		637	28.3	.381	.699	9.7	1.7	12.0
All-Star		3	19.3	.375	.200	7.0	1.0	6.3

=== Playoffs ===
Year	Team	GP	MPG	FG%	FT%	RPG	APG	PPG
1949	Rochester	4	–	.415	.667	–	**2.5**	16.5
1950	Rochester	2	–	.368	.600	–	2.0	11.5
1951†	Rochester	**14**	–	.389	.644	14.0	2.4	**19.5**
1952	Rochester	6	**38.2**	.407	.700	12.5	1.5	15.7
1953	Rochester	3	36.3	.289	.708	11.7	0.7	13.0
1954	Rochester	6	33.3	.418	**.750**	9.0	0.7	14.8
1955	Rochester	3	25.7	**.447**	.737	12.3	1.7	16.0
1956	Boston	3	29.3	.353	.722	**14.7**	0.7	12.3
1957†	Boston	10	15.2	.444	.655	5.8	0.8	7.5
1958	Boston	10	16.8	.231	.667	6.2	0.9	4.6
Career		61	25.0	.385	.677	10.2	1.4	13.0
