= Ray Ellefson =

American basketball player

Personal information
- Born: September 18, 1922 Brookings, South Dakota, U.S.
- Died: October 7, 1994 (aged 72) Sioux Falls, South Dakota, U.S.
- Listed height: 6 ft 8 in (2.03 m)
- Listed weight: 230 lb (104 kg)

Career information
- College: Colorado (1944–1945); Oklahoma State (1947–1948)
- BAA draft: 1948: undrafted
- Playing career: 1948–1951
- Position: Center
- Number: 18

Career history
- 1948–1949: Waterloo Hawks
- 1948–1949: Minneapolis Lakers
- 1949–1950: New York Celtics
- 1950: New York Knicks
- 1950–1951: Wilkes-Barre Barons
- Stats at NBA.com
- Stats at Basketball Reference

Eugene Raymond Ellefson (September 18, 1922 – October 7, 1994) was an American professional basketball player. He was a 6'8" 230 lb forward and attended West Texas A&M University, Oklahoma A&M University, the University of Colorado, and Oklahoma State University.

Ellefson played for the NBA's Minneapolis Lakers and New York Knicks from 1948 to 1951, averaging 1.0 points and 1.3 rebounds per game.

== BAA/NBA career statistics ==
Legend
GP	Games played	FG%	Field-goal percentage
FT%	Free-throw percentage	RPG	Rebounds per game
APG	Assists per game	PPG	Points per game
**Bold**	Career high

=== Regular season ===
Year	Team	GP	FG%	FT%	RPG	APG	PPG
1948–49	Minneapolis	**3**	**.200**	.000	–	.0	.7
1950–51	New York	**3**	.000	**1.000**	**2.7**	.0	**1.3**
Career		6	.111	1.000	2.7	.0	1.0
