= HoopsHype =

Basketball news website

- Website type: Sports
- Owner: USA Today Sports Media Group
- Founder: Jorge Sierra
- Website: hoopshype.com
- Launched: 2002; 24 years ago

HoopsHype is a website that focuses on basketball news, particularly about the National Basketball Association (NBA).

== History ==
The website was founded by Jorge Sierra, who has operated it since 2002. Sierra runs the site with Angel Marin and Raul Barrigon. In March 2008, the website was acquired by Fantasy Sports Ventures. Later, in February 2012, USA Today Sports Media Group acquired the website.

Focused on news relating to the NBA, the site is noted for its frequent publishing of rumor mill topics relating to the NBA, as well as information relating to agents, and for its profiles and interviews of NBA players. The website and its content has been cited by sports media writers such as Bill Simmons and Pablo Torre, as well as other sports news websites such as Bleacher Report, CBS Sports, ESPN, and Sports Illustrated. During a 2015 interview by ESPN, NBA player Jamal Crawford stated: "I watch League Pass every second. I'm on HoopsHype, I'm on ESPN, I can tell you about whosever's [sic] game you want to know about. Because I breathe it. I loved basketball before I loved anything else."
