= 1950–51 Minneapolis Lakers season =

NBA pro basketball team season

- Division champions
- Head coach: John Kundla
- Arena: Minneapolis Auditorium

Results
- Record: 44–24 (.647)
- Place: Division: 1st (Western)
- Playoff finish: Division finals (lost to Royals 1–3)
- Stats at Basketball Reference
- Radio: WLOL

The 1950–51 Minneapolis Lakers season was the franchise's third season in the National Basketball Association (NBA). In 1950–51, the NBA reduced the number of teams to 11. The two-time defending champion Lakers continued to dominate by winning the Western Division with a 44–24 record. However, one of their games played that season saw them be inadvertently involved in a failed rigging going on by NBA referee Sol Levy on November 4 (which became their first win of the season) by having Minneapolis beat the Washington Capitols (who would later fold operations altogether during the 1950–51 season, reducing the team pool to 10 during the season) in the first of six games of mixed results for Levy attempting to rig the season in his favor. Levy would later be arrested and then be tried as an accomplice in his involvement in the CCNY point-shaving scandal in 1951. In addition to that failed fixed game, this season would also be notable for an infamous match played less than a month later on November 22, 1950 against the Fort Wayne Pistons, which saw the Pistons holding onto the ball for a vast majority of the match in order to not allow the Lakers' star center, George Mikan, a chance to dominate them in the paint, which worked too well in Fort Wayne's favor to the point where it resulted in the lowest-scoring match in NBA history with a 19–18 victory favoring the Pistons (and subsequently resulted in the Lakers breaking a record previously held by the Detroit Falcons for the lowest scoring effort in a BAA/NBA match, albeit by force instead of by accidental intention), which resulted in spectators of the match feeling like they wouldn't be interested in the sport of basketball at all if that match was a reflection of what it truly was and subsequently led to the creation of the shot clock a few seasons later in order to help make sure the NBA never had another game like that ever again in its history.

In the playoffs, the Lakers needed three games to eliminate the Indianapolis Olympians in the first round. In the Western Finals, the Lakers took Game 1, but were ultimately defeated for the championship by the Rochester Royals, who came back to win the next three games. As a result, this became the first season where the Lakers failed to win a championship under the Lakers name.

== Roster ==
1950–51 Minneapolis Lakers roster
Players

Pos.	No.	Player	Height	Weight	DOB	From
F	12	Ed Beach	6 ft 3 in (1.91 m)	200 lb (91 kg)	1929-01-25	West Virginia
G/F	18	Arnie Ferrin	6 ft 2 in (1.88 m)	180 lb (82 kg)	1925-07-29	Utah
F	20	Bud Grant	6 ft 3 in (1.91 m)	195 lb (88 kg)	1927-05-20	Minnesota
G	16	Bob Harrison	6 ft 1 in (1.85 m)	190 lb (86 kg)	1927-08-12	Michigan
G	14	Joe Hutton	6 ft 1 in (1.85 m)	170 lb (77 kg)	1928-10-06	Hamline
G/F	13	Tony Jaros	6 ft 3 in (1.91 m)	185 lb (84 kg)	1920-02-22	Minnesota
G	22	Slater Martin	5 ft 10 in (1.78 m)	170 lb (77 kg)	1925-10-22	Texas
C	99	George Mikan	6 ft 10 in (2.08 m)	245 lb (111 kg)	1924-06-18	DePaul
F/C	19	Vern Mikkelsen	6 ft 7 in (2.01 m)	230 lb (104 kg)	1928-10-21	Hamline
G	15	Kevin O'Shea	6 ft 2 in (1.88 m)	175 lb (79 kg)	1925-07-10	Notre Dame
F/C	17	Jim Pollard	6 ft 4 in (1.93 m)	185 lb (84 kg)	1922-07-09	Stanford

Coaches
Head coach

John Kundla

Legend
- (DP) Unsigned draft pick
- (FA) Free agent
- (S) Suspended
- Injured

Roster

== Regular season ==
=== Standings ===
Western Division	W	L	PCT	GB	Home	Road	Neutral	Div
x-Minneapolis Lakers	44	24	.647	–	29–3	12–21	3–0	24–12
x-Rochester Royals	41	27	.603	3	29–5	12–22	–	18–15
x-Fort Wayne Pistons	32	36	.471	12	27–7	5–27	0–2	18–6
x-Indianapolis Olympians	31	37	.456	13	19–12	10–24	2–1	15–20
Tri-Cities Blackhawks	25	43	.368	19	22–13	2–28	1–2	12–24

=== Game log ===
#	Date	Opponent	Score	High points	Record
1	November 1	at Baltimore	71–81	George Mikan (34)	0–1
2	November 4	at Washington	91–85	George Mikan (27)	1–1
3	November 5	at Syracuse	87–90	George Mikan (29)	1–2
4	November 9	at Boston	71–76	George Mikan (24)	1–3
5	November 12	Philadelphia	70–83	George Mikan (25)	2–3
6	November 15	Syracuse	71–72 (OT)	George Mikan (28)	3–3
7	November 16	at New York	69–71	George Mikan (27)	3–4
8	November 18	at Rochester	86–77 (2OT)	George Mikan (47)	4–4
9	November 19	Rochester	77–90	George Mikan (23)	5–4
10	November 22	Fort Wayne	18–19	George Mikan (15)	5–5
11	November 23	at Fort Wayne	63–73	George Mikan (32)	5–6
12	November 26	Baltimore	71–85	George Mikan (23)	6–6
13	November 29	Tri-Cities	66–85	Slater Martin (19)	7–6
14	December 1	at Indianapolis	65–66	George Mikan (22)	7–7
15	December 3	Philadelphia	83–95	George Mikan (38)	8–7
16	December 6	New York	62–84	Jim Pollard (17)	9–7
17	December 9	at Tri-Cities	88–79	George Mikan (37)	10–7
18	December 10	Tri-Cities	101–114	George Mikan (29)	11–7
19	December 13	Rochester	82–72	George Mikan (43)	11–8
20	December 15	at Indianapolis	82–71	George Mikan (32)	12–8
21	December 16	at Tri-Cities	86–71	George Mikan (21)	13–8
22	December 17	Indianapolis	60–79	George Mikan (29)	14–8
23	December 19	at Philadelphia	67–71	George Mikan (25)	14–9
24	December 20	at Baltimore	84–91	George Mikan (39)	14–10
25	December 23	at Boston	81–87	George Mikan (31)	14–11
26	December 25	Washington	79–93	George Mikan (35)	15–11
27	December 27	Baltimore	63–81	George Mikan (19)	16–11
28	December 28	at Rochester	67–75	George Mikan (41)	16–12
29	December 31	Philadelphia	73–83	George Mikan (24)	17–12
30	January 1	at Fort Wayne	70–83	Vern Mikkelsen (20)	17–13
31	January 3	Fort Wayne	64–86	Vern Mikkelsen (23)	18–13
32	January 4	at Syracuse	80–77	George Mikan (27)	19–13
33	January 5	Boston	54–69	Vern Mikkelsen (17)	20–13
34	January 7	Rochester	57–69	Vern Mikkelsen (26)	21–13
35	January 10	New York	65–70	George Mikan (21)	22–13
36	January 11	at Tri-Cities	113–109	George Mikan (34)	23–13
37	January 14	Indianapolis	84–86 (OT)	George Mikan (28)	24–13
38	January 16	at Indianapolis	68–82	George Mikan (21)	24–14
39	January 18	at New York	78–95	George Mikan (27)	24–15
40	January 20	N Fort Wayne	89–70	George Mikan (27)	25–15
41	January 21	Tri-Cities	82–89	George Mikan (31)	26–15
42	January 23	N Baltimore	89–79	Vern Mikkelsen (20)	27–15
43	January 25	at Philadelphia	90–71	George Mikan (24)	28–15
44	January 28	Indianapolis	75–101	George Mikan (34)	29–15
45	January 31	Tri-Cities	78–106	George Mikan (35)	30–15
46	February 3	at Indianapolis	89–84	George Mikan (29)	31–15
47	February 4	Boston	84–98	George Mikan (29)	32–15
48	February 7	at Fort Wayne	86–96	George Mikan (20)	32–16
49	February 8	Rochester	58–69	George Mikan (37)	33–16
50	February 11	Indianapolis	78–91	George Mikan (27)	34–16
51	February 14	Baltimore	71–99	George Mikan (28)	35–16
52	February 16	at Indianapolis	76–71	George Mikan (32)	36–16
53	February 17	at Rochester	82–87	George Mikan (30)	36–17
54	February 18	at Syracuse	80–91	George Mikan (25)	36–18
55	February 21	Syracuse	76–82	George Mikan (36)	37–18
56	February 24	Fort Wayne	78–95	George Mikan (32)	38–18
57	February 25	Indianapolis	75–73	Mikan, Pollard (20)	38–19
58	February 27	N Tri-Cities	77–83	George Mikan (33)	39–19
59	February 28	at Fort Wayne	73–77	George Mikan (39)	39–20
60	March 1	at Philadelphia	77–97	Jim Pollard (26)	39–21
61	March 4	at Boston	86–92	George Mikan (44)	39–22
62	March 6	at Rochester	79–90	George Mikan (18)	39–23
63	March 8	at New York	94–97 (OT)	George Mikan (40)	39–24
64	March 10	at Tri-Cities	99–88	George Mikan (46)	40–24
65	March 11	Boston	96–98 (2OT)	George Mikan (40)	41–24
66	March 14	Syracuse	76–100	George Mikan (40)	42–24
67	March 17	at Tri-Cities	92–91 (OT)	George Mikan (38)	43–24
68	March 18	New York	68–86	Vern Mikkelsen (19)	44–24

== Player stats ==
Note: GP= Games played; REB= Rebounds; AST= Assists; STL = Steals; BLK = Blocks; PTS = Points; AVG = Average

Player	GP	REB	AST	STL	BLK	PTS	AVG

== Playoffs ==
1951 playoff game log
Division semifinals: 2–1 (home: 2–0; road: 0–1)

Game	Date	Team	Score	High points	Location	Series
1	March 21	Indianapolis	W 95–81	George Mikan (41)	Minneapolis Auditorium	1–0
2	March 23	@ Indianapolis	L 88–108	Vern Mikkelsen (30)	Butler Fieldhouse	1–1
3	March 25	Indianapolis	W 85–80	George Mikan (30)	Minneapolis Auditorium	2–1

Division finals: 1–3 (home: 1–1; road: 0–2)

Game	Date	Team	Score	High points	Location	Series
1	March 29	Rochester	W 76–73	Vern Mikkelsen (23)	Minneapolis Auditorium	1–0
2	March 31	Rochester	L 66–70	Jim Pollard (20)	Minneapolis Auditorium	1–1
3	April 1	@ Rochester	L 70–83	George Mikan (23)	Edgerton Park Arena	1–2
4	April 3	@ Rochester	L 75–80	George Mikan (32)	Edgerton Park Arena	1–3

1951 schedule

== Awards and honors ==
- George Mikan, All-NBA First Team
- Vern Mikkelsen, All-NBA Second Team
- George Mikan, NBA All-Star Game
- Vern Mikkelsen, NBA All-Star Game
- Jim Pollard, NBA All-Star Game
