= Bob Davies =

American basketball player-coach

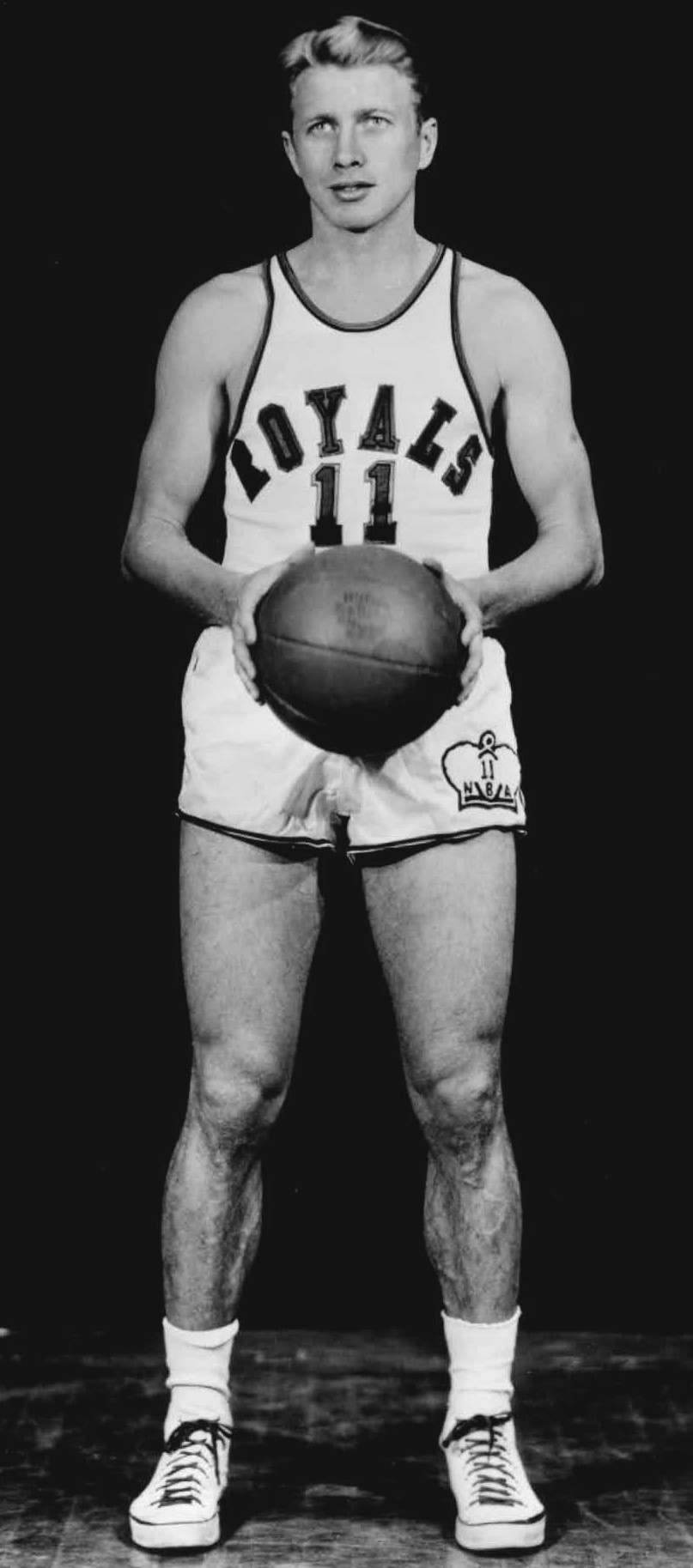

Personal information
- Born: January 15, 1920 Harrisburg, Pennsylvania, U.S.
- Died: April 22, 1990 (aged 70) Hilton Head Island, South Carolina, U.S.
- Listed height: 6 ft 1 in (1.85 m)
- Listed weight: 175 lb (79 kg)

Career information
- High school: John Harris (Harrisburg, Pennsylvania)
- College: Seton Hall (1939–1942)
- Playing career: 1943–1955
- Position: Point guard
- Number: 11
- Coaching career: 1946–1957

Career history

Playing
- 1943–1944: Brooklyn Indians
- 1944–1945: New York Gothams
- 1945–1955: Rochester Royals

Coaching
- 1946–1947: Seton Hall
- 1955–1957: Gettysburg

Career highlights
- NBA champion (1951); 4× NBA All-Star (1951–1954); 4× All-BAA/NBA First Team (1949–1952); All-NBA Second Team (1953); NBA assists leader (1949); NBA 25th Anniversary Team (1971); NBL champion (1946); NBL Most Valuable Player (1947); All-NBL First Team (1947); All-NBL Second Team (1948); No. 11 retired by Sacramento Kings; Consensus first-team All-American (1942); No. 11 retired by Seton Hall Pirates

Career NBA statistics
- Points: 6,594 (14.3 ppg)
- Assists: 2,250 (4.9 apg)
- Rebounds: 980 (2.9 rpg)
- Stats at NBA.com
- Stats at Basketball Reference
- Basketball Hall of Fame
- Collegiate Basketball Hall of Fame

Robert Edris Davies (January 15, 1920 – April 22, 1990) was an American professional basketball player. Davies and Bobby Wanzer formed one of the best backcourt duos in the National Basketball Association's (NBA) early years. Davies and Wanzer led the Rochester Royals to the 1951 NBA championship. Davies was also a basketball coach at the Seton Hall University and was inducted to the Naismith Memorial Basketball Hall of Fame on April 11, 1970.

Although Bob Cousy is often considered the originator of the behind-the-back dribble, many say Davies actually deserves the credit. His Seton Hall coach, John "Honey" Russell, once said, "He had such uncanny control of the ball behind his back that it never concerned me. He made it look as easy as the conventional dribble."

== College career and military service ==
Davies entered Seton Hall in 1938 on a baseball scholarship, but Russell persuaded him to concentrate on basketball after seeing him practice once. Never a high scorer—his best college average was 11.8 points a game—Davies was a consummate passer and play-maker.."

Known as the "Harrisburg Houdini", Davies led Seton Hall to 43 consecutive victories from 1939 into 1941. His spectacular skills helped attract the largest crowd in basketball history at the time, 18,403 people, to Madison Square Garden in March 1941, when Seton Hall beat Rhode Island in a quarter-final game of the National Invitation Tournament.

An All-American guard in 1941 and 1942, Davies joined the U. S. Navy during World War II and led the Great Lakes Naval Training Station team to a 34–3 record before going overseas.

== Professional career ==
After the war, he joined the Rochester Royals and played with them through the 1954–55 season. Davies helped lead the Royals to an NBL title in 1946, and was named MVP of the NBL for the 1946–47 season. Davies was named to the NBA All-NBA First-Team four straight years, from 1949 through 1952, and he led the NBA in assists with 321 in 1948–49. In his 10 NBL/NBA seasons, Davis scored 7,770 points, averaging 13.7 a game, and had 2,250 assists. He added 904 points and 182 assists in 67 playoff games. He was one of the ten players named to the NBA 25th Anniversary Team in 1971.

== Coaching career ==
Davies coached Seton Hall in 1946–47, while playing with the Royals, and compiled a 24–3 record. After retiring as a player, he coached Gettysburg College for two seasons, winning 28 games while losing 19.

== Legacy ==
The No. 11 jersey worn by Davies during his playing days with the Rochester Royals was retired by the team. The Sacramento Kings, the present holders of the franchise, continue the honor. In 2024, Davies's family gave permission for Domantas Sabonis to un-retire the number so Sabonis could wear it in honor of his father, Arvydas Sabonis, who played for the Portland Trail Blazers.

After retiring from basketball, Davies was a salesman for the Converse Shoe Company.

== Career statistics ==
=== BAA/NBA ===
Legend
GP	Games played	GS	Games started	MPG	Minutes per game
FG%	Field goal percentage	3P%	3-point field goal percentage	FT%	Free throw percentage
RPG	Rebounds per game	APG	Assists per game	SPG	Steals per game
BPG	Blocks per game	PPG	Points per game	**Bold**	Career high
†	Won an NBA championship	*	Led the league

==== Regular season ====
Year	Team	GP	MPG	FG%	FT%	RPG	APG	PPG
1948–49	Rochester	60	–	.364	.776	–	5.4*	15.1
1949–50	Rochester	64	–	.357	.752	–	4.6	14.0
1950–51†	Rochester	63	–	.372	**.795**	**3.1**	4.6	15.2
1951–52	Rochester	65	**36.8**	.383	.776	2.9	**6.0**	**16.2**
1952–53	Rochester	66	33.6	.385	.753	3.0	4.2	15.6
1953–54	Rochester	**72**	29.7	.371	.718	2.7	4.5	12.3
1954–55	Rochester	**72**	26.0	**.415**	.751	2.8	4.9	12.1
Career		462	31.3	.378	.759	2.9	4.9	14.3
All-Star		4	18.8	.475	.714	3.3	4.3	12.0

==== Playoffs ====
Year	Team	GP	MPG	FG%	FT%	RPG	APG	PPG
1949	Rochester	4	–	.373	.769	–	3.3	12.0
1950	Rochester	2	–	.235	**.875**	–	4.5	7.5
1951†	Rochester	**14**	–	.338	.800	**3.1**	**5.4**	15.9
1952	Rochester	6	**38.8**	**.402**	.818	2.2	4.7	**19.8**
1953	Rochester	3	30.3	.207	.700	1.3	4.7	8.7
1954	Rochester	6	28.7	.327	.739	2.0	2.3	8.5
1955	Rochester	3	25.0	.333	.750	2.0	3.0	8.3
Career		38	31.7	.341	.788	2.4	4.3	13.3

=== College ===
Year	Team	GP	PPG
1939–40	Seton Hall	18	**11.8**
1940–41	Seton Hall	**22**	10.2
1941–42	Seton Hall	19	**11.8**
Career		59	11.2
