= Nat Clifton =

American basketball player and coach (1922–1990)

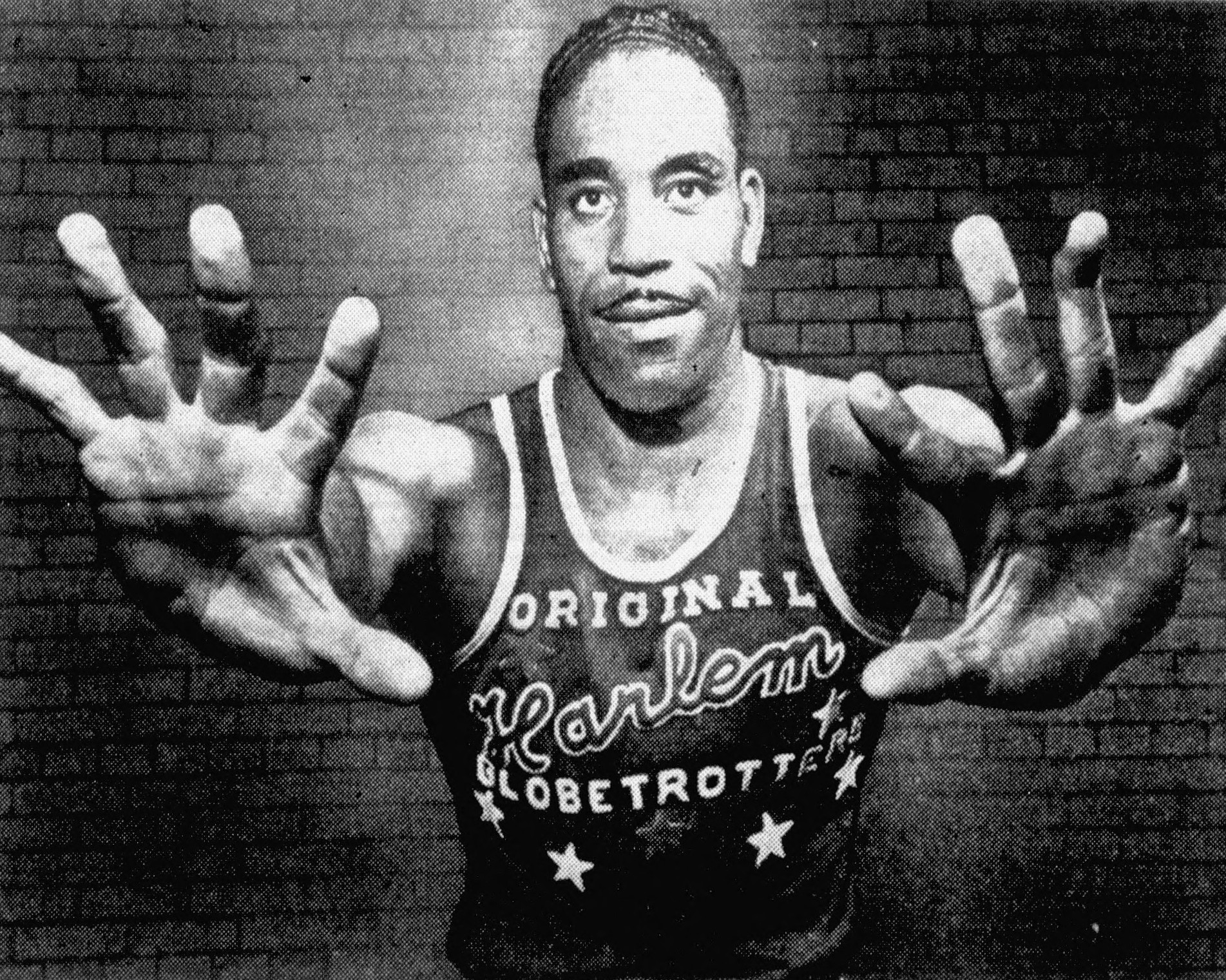
- Clifton, circa 1949

Personal information
- Born: October 13, 1922 England, Arkansas, U.S.
- Died: August 31, 1990 (aged 67) Chicago, Illinois, U.S.
- Listed height: 6 ft 6 in (1.98 m)
- Listed weight: 220 lb (100 kg)

Career information
- High school: DuSable (Chicago, Illinois)
- College: Xavier (Louisiana) (1942–1943)
- Playing career: 1945–1961
- Position: Power forward
- Number: 19, 8, 24

Career history
- 1945–1947: New York Rens
- 1947–1950: Harlem Globetrotters
- 1950–1957: New York Knicks
- 1957–1958: Detroit Pistons
- 1961: Chicago Majors

Career highlights
- NBA All-Star (1957)

Career NBA statistics
- Points: 5,444 (10.0 ppg)
- Rebounds: 4,469 (8.2 rpg)
- Assists: 1,367 (2.5 apg)
- Stats at NBA.com
- Stats at Basketball Reference
- Basketball Hall of Fame

Nathaniel "Sweetwater" Clifton (born Clifton Nathaniel; October 13, 1922 – August 31, 1990) was an American professional basketball player who was one of the first African Americans to play in the National Basketball Association (NBA). He was also a professional baseball player.

== Biography ==
=== Early life ===
Born in England, Arkansas, as Clifton Nathaniel, he was given the "Sweetwater" nickname as a boy because of his love of soft drinks and his easy disposition. His family moved to Chicago when he was eight years old. Clifton became an outstanding basketball and baseball player at DuSable High School. He reversed his two names when sportswriters complained that his last name, Nathaniel, was too long to fit in their headlines. He graduated in 1942.

Clifton attended Xavier University of Louisiana in New Orleans and then served with the United States Army for three years, fighting in Europe during World War II.

=== Early career ===
After the war, Clifton joined the New York Rens, an all-black professional basketball team that toured throughout the United States. Noted for his large hands, which required a size 14 glove, he was invited to join the Harlem Globetrotters, for whom he played from the summer of 1948 to the spring of 1950. Still a talented baseball first baseman, during the basketball off-season in 1949 Clifton played for the Chicago American Giants in Negro league baseball. By 1950, his performance with the Globetrotters, in particular his exceptional ball-handling ability, led to his signing a contract with an NBA team.

=== NBA career ===
Clifton's grave at Restvale Cemetery

On May 24, 1950, Clifton became the second African-American player to sign an NBA contract. (Note: Harold Hunter was the first, signing with the Washington Capitols on April 26, 1950. However, he was cut from the team during training camp and did not play professionally. Some sources conflict and list Clifton as the first African-American to sign in the NBA.) He played his first game for the New York Knicks on November 4, four days after the debut of Washington Capitols player Earl Lloyd, the first black player to appear in an NBA game. Already 27 years old when he made his debut, Clifton in his first season helped lead the team to its first-ever appearance in the NBA finals, losing in game seven. During his eight seasons in the NBA, Clifton averaged 10 points and 9 rebounds per game. He was named to the 1957 NBA All-Star team, scoring 8 points in 23 minutes in the game. At age 34, he became the oldest player in NBA history to be named a first time All-Star.

In 1957, Clifton was part of a multi-player trade between the Knicks and the Fort Wayne Pistons, but after one season in Detroit he retired from basketball. In the summer of 1958, he joined the Detroit Stars baseball team in the Negro leagues, along with his former Harlem Globetrotters teammate Reece "Goose" Tatum.

In 1961, he was coaxed out of retirement by the Chicago Majors of the fledgling American Basketball League (ABL). After the league folded at the end of 1962, the 40-year-old Clifton retired permanently.

Clifton died at age 67 on August 31, 1990, in Chicago. He was interred in the Restvale Cemetery in the Chicago suburb of Alsip.

== Legacy ==
Clifton's contributions to his community during his sporting career and after his playing days, have been recognized by the Associated Black Charities of New York City. They have honored him by naming one of the Black History Maker Awards the Nathaniel 'Sweetwater' Clifton Award.

In 2005, the New York Knicks basketball team renamed their monthly City Spirit Award in his honor. The Sweetwater Clifton City Spirit Award is given to a member of the community who goes above and beyond his or her normal duties to make the lives of others in the tri-state area better.

Clifton, who played softball for the Brown Bombers and Capitol Records team of the Daddy-O Daylie League, was also inducted into Chicago 16-inch softball Hall of Fame.

On February 14, 2014, Clifton was announced as a 2014 inductee by the Naismith Memorial Basketball Hall of Fame. He formally entered the Hall as a player on August 8.

A film on Clifton's life, Sweetwater, had been in planning with Sunset Pictures since 2007 and was released on April 14, 2023.

== NBA career statistics ==
Legend
GP	Games played	GS	Games started	MPG	Minutes per game
FG%	Field goal percentage	3P%	3-point field goal percentage	FT%	Free throw percentage
RPG	Rebounds per game	APG	Assists per game	SPG	Steals per game
BPG	Blocks per game	PPG	Points per game	**Bold**	Career high

=== Regular season ===
Year	Team	GP	MPG	FG%	FT%	RPG	APG	PPG
1950–51	New York	65	–	.322	.532	7.6	2.5	8.6
1951–52	New York	62	33.9	.335	.664	**11.8**	**3.4**	10.6
1952–53	New York	70	**35.7**	.343	.583	10.9	3.3	10.6
1953–54	New York	**72**	30.3	.368	.628	7.3	2.4	9.6
1954–55	New York	**72**	33.2	.386	.683	8.5	2.8	**13.1**
1955–56	New York	64	24.0	**.394**	**.707**	6.0	2.4	8.8
1956–57	New York	71	31.4	.377	.673	7.8	2.3	10.7
1957–58	Detroit	68	21.1	.363	.623	5.9	1.1	7.7
Career		544	30.0	.361	.633	8.2	2.5	10.0
All-Star		1	23.0	.364	–	11.0	3.0	8.0

=== Playoffs ===
Year	Team	GP	MPG	FG%	FT%	RPG	APG	PPG
1951	New York	**14**	–	.347	.391	9.8	3.3	7.1
1952	New York	**14**	33.0	.293	.711	9.5	2.4	9.4
1953	New York	11	**36.8**	**.395**	.638	**12.7**	3.5	12.0
1954	New York	4	31.3	.296	.529	9.8	1.5	6.3
1955	New York	3	36.7	.385	**.792**	7.7	**4.3**	**19.7**
1958	Detroit	7	10.6	.367	.750	3.3	0.6	4.0
Career		53	30.2	.348	.624	9.3	2.7	9.0

== See also ==
- Race and ethnicity in the NBA
- List of African American firsts
