= Edgerton Park Arena =

Former indoor arena in Rochester, New York

Coordinates: 43.1727°N 77.6344°W

- Interactive map of Edgerton Park Arena
- Owner: City of Rochester
- Capacity: Basketball: 4,200; Hockey: 3,500
- Public transit: Rochester Subway (Edgerton Park)

Construction
- Opened: October 18, 1892
- Closed: 1956

Tenants
- Rochester Cardinals (IHL) (1935–36); Rochester Royals (NBL/BAA/NBA) (1945–55)

Edgerton Park Arena was an indoor arena in Rochester, New York. The building was originally constructed in 1892 as the drill hall for a training school for delinquent boys. When the school moved early in the 20th century, the building was turned into an indoor sports arena and exhibition hall. An artificial ice-making system was installed in 1935.

The first professional team to use the building was the Rochester Cardinals hockey team in 1935–36. The Cardinals played in the International Hockey League and were a farm team of the New York Americans of the National Hockey League. Rochester could have been a charter member of the International-American Hockey League which formed in the summer of 1936 upon the merger of the IHL and the Canadian-American Hockey Leagues. However, the Cardinals went into receivership before the end of the 1935–36 season and no suitable owner could be found to operate the team. Also, the arena sat only 3,500 for hockey and officials of the new league wanted a minimum capacity of 5,000. The City of Rochester, the arena's owners, refused to expand the building. This refusal to expand the building meant Rochester had to wait until the Community War Memorial Arena (now Blue Cross Arena at the War Memorial) opened in 1955 to join what by that point had become the American Hockey League. Rochester was awarded a new franchise in the American Hockey League in 1956 after Pittsburgh withdrew. The Rochester Americans began play in the 1956–57 season.

Edgerton Park Arena was the primary home of the NBA's Rochester Royals from 1945 to 1955. On April 21, 1951, The Royals won the franchise's first and only NBA championship over the New York Knickerbockers 4 games to 3. The Royals moved into the new Rochester Community War Memorial for the 1955–56 NBA season. But because of periodic scheduling conflicts and the two-month-long 1956 American Bowling Congress Finals scheduled for the War Memorial, the Royals returned to the Arena to play several games during the 1955–56 season. It also hosted performances by the Glenn Miller Orchestra and cowboy star Gene Autry in the 1940s. The arena held 4,200 people for basketball. The building's last user, the Monroe County Fair, moved to what is now The Dome Center in Henrietta in 1957; the building was demolished shortly thereafter. The space is now the site of baseball fields behind the Rochester International Academy; the western wall of the building ran along what is now the far diamond's right field line, parallel to RIA's western wall.

Preceded by first arena	Home of the Rochester Royals; 1945 – 1955	Succeeded by Rochester War Memorial
