= 1950–51 NBA season =

Fifth NBA season

- League: National Basketball Association
- Sport: Basketball
- Duration: October 31, 1950 – March 18, 1951; March 20 – April 4, 1951 (Playoffs); April 7–21, 1951 (Finals)
- Games: 66-69
- Teams: 11 (10 midway through the season)

Draft
- Top draft pick: Chuck Share
- Picked by: Boston Celtics

Regular season
- Top seed: Minneapolis Lakers
- Top scorer: George Mikan (Minneapolis)

Playoffs
- Eastern champions: New York Knicks
- Eastern runners-up: Syracuse Nationals
- Western champions: Rochester Royals
- Western runners-up: Minneapolis Lakers

Finals
- Champions: Rochester Royals
- Runners-up: New York Knicks

NBA seasons
- ← 1949–50 1951–52 →

The 1950–51 NBA season was the fifth season of the National Basketball Association. The season ended with the Rochester Royals winning the NBA championship, beating the New York Knicks 4 games to 3 in the NBA Finals.

== Notable occurrences ==
- The NBA began recording rebounds.
- The NBA contracted itself, losing six teams (the Anderson Packers, original Denver Nuggets, Sheboygan Red Skins and Waterloo Hawks jumped to the short-lived National Professional Basketball League, while the Chicago Stags and St. Louis Bombers just folded operations before the season began) and shrank from 17 teams to 11 before the season started. Chicago would not have a new NBA team again until the 1960s, while Denver wouldn't have a new team called the Nuggets until a new, modern iteration of the squad that has no relationship to the original Nuggets team joined the NBA in 1976 following the ABA-NBA merger that year. Midway through the season, the Washington Capitols folded operations as well, bringing the number of teams in the league down to ten by the end of the season. Washington, D.C. would not have another professional basketball team until the American Basketball Association’s Oakland Oaks American Basketball Association squad relocated there for one season in 1969–70. Washington’s next NBA team would not be established until a future, reformed version of the Baltimore Bullets (who aren't related to the Baltimore Bullets that exist during this season) relocated there in 1973.
- Following the NBA's contraction by the start of this season, the NBA would remove the Central Division from its existence (with it not returning again until the 1970–71 season), with the Eastern Division remaining intact to start out this season (though later losing the Washington Capitols by January 1951) and the realigned Western Division combining the remaining teams from the prior Western Division (Indianapolis and the Tri-Cities) and the temporarily short-lived Central Division (Fort Wayne, Minneapolis, Rochester) for its new Western Division for this season.
- Earl Lloyd became the NBA's first Black player when (in the opening game of the season in Rochester) the Washington Capitols put him in the game after halftime. He went on to score six points and grab a game-high 10 rebounds, but the breaking of the color barrier merited barely a mention in news reports of the time. Chuck Cooper of the Boston Celtics and Nat "Sweetwater" Clifton of the New York Knicks also played in their teams' openers within a few days.
- The lowest scoring game in NBA history occurred on November 22, 1950, where the Fort Wayne Pistons would defeat the Minneapolis Lakers by the final score of 19–18. It would be a catalyst for the NBA to implement the shot clock a few seasons later.
- The longest game in NBA history (by playing time) took place on January 6, 1951, between the Indianapolis Olympians and the Rochester Royals. The game, held in Rochester at Edgerton Park Arena, ended 75–73 after 78 minutes, including six overtimes. The overtimes saw only 18 points scored between the two teams, so this game also became a factor in the introduction of the shot clock.
- Due to the late finish of their game against the Rochester Royals, the Indianapolis Olympians missed their train connection to Chicago, where they were to play the Tri-Cities Blackhawks on January 7, 1951. They caught a train to Detroit and then hired a plane to go to Molina, Illinois. Only 5 players could travel by plane, so the starting five took the plane while the remaining players travelled by bus. By the time they arrived, the game had finished, making this the only occasion in NBA history where a team used only 5 players.
- During the month of January 1951, it was discovered by New York District Attorney Frank Hogan that Sol Levy, a referee that has been a part of the NBA for three seasons, had arranged to fix the outcomes of six different NBA games under an accomplice of his. Levy would later be suspended, arrested, and subsequently permanently banned from the NBA for his role in fixing NBA games, becoming the first official to be banned in such a case. Baltimore Bullets rookie Norm Mager would subsequently be the first official NBA player to be permanently banned afterward when it was discovered he was involved in the CCNY point-shaving scandal back when he was a senior there.
- The first annual NBA All-Star Game, a showcase of the league's top players, was played in Boston, Massachusetts, with the East beating the West 111–94. Ed Macauley of the Boston Celtics received the first NBA All-Star Game Most Valuable Player Award.

Coaching changes
Offseason
Team	1949–50 coach	1950–51 coach
Boston Celtics	Doggie Julian	Red Auerbach
Tri-Cities Blackhawks	Red Auerbach	Dave MacMillan
Washington Capitols	Bob Feerick	Bones McKinney
In-season
Team	Outgoing coach	Incoming coach
Baltimore Bullets	Buddy Jeannette	Walt Budko
Indianapolis Olympians	Cliff Barker	Wallace Jones
Tri-Cities Blackhawks	Dave MacMillan; Johnny Logan (interim)	Johnny Logan (interim); Mike Todorovich

== Final standings ==
=== Eastern Division ===
Eastern Division	W	L	PCT	GB	Home	Road	Neutral	Div
x-Philadelphia Warriors	40	26	.606	–	28–4	11–21	1–1	22–14
x-Boston Celtics	39	30	.565	1	25–5	10–23	4–2	21–19
x-New York Knicks	36	30	.545	4	22–5	10–25	4–0	21–15
x-Syracuse Nationals	32	34	.485	8	23–10	9–24	–	19–17
Baltimore Bullets	24	42	.364	16	20–12	4–24	0–6	12–24
Washington Capitols†	10	25	.286	30	7–12	3–12	0–1	6–12

=== Western Division ===
Western Division	W	L	PCT	GB	Home	Road	Neutral	Div
x-Minneapolis Lakers	44	24	.647	–	29–3	12–21	3–0	24–12
x-Rochester Royals	41	27	.603	3	29–5	12–22	–	18–15
x-Fort Wayne Pistons	32	36	.471	12	27–7	5–27	0–2	18–6
x-Indianapolis Olympians	31	37	.456	13	19–12	10–24	2–1	15–20
Tri-Cities Blackhawks	25	43	.368	19	22–13	2–28	1–2	12–24

x – Clinched playoff spot
†: folded operations during season

== Playoffs ==
Division Semifinals
E1	Philadelphia*	0
E4	Syracuse	2
Eastern Division
E3	New York	2
E2	Boston	0
W1	Minneapolis*	2
W4	Indianapolis	1
Western Division
W3	Fort Wayne	1
W2	Rochester	2

Division Finals
E4	Syracuse	2
E3	New York	3
W1	Minneapolis*	1
W2	Rochester	3

NBA Finals
E3	New York	3
W2	Rochester	4

- * Division winner
- Bold Series winner
- Italic Team with home-court advantage in NBA Finals

== Statistics leaders ==
Category	Player	Team	Stat
Points	George Mikan	Minneapolis Lakers	1,932
Rebounds	Dolph Schayes	Syracuse Nationals	1,080
Assists	Andy Phillip	Philadelphia Warriors	414
FG%	Alex Groza	Indianapolis Olympians	.470
FT%	Joe Fulks	Philadelphia Warriors	.855

Note: Prior to the 1969–70 season, league leaders in points, rebounds, and assists were determined by totals rather than averages.

== NBA awards ==
- All-NBA First Team:
  - Alex Groza, Indianapolis Olympians
  - Ralph Beard, Indianapolis Olympians
  - Bob Davies, Rochester Royals
  - George Mikan, Minneapolis Lakers
  - Ed Macauley, Boston Celtics
- All-NBA Second Team:
  - Frank Brian, Tri-Cities Blackhawks
  - Joe Fulks, Philadelphia Warriors
  - Dick McGuire, New York Knicks
  - Vern Mikkelsen, Minneapolis Lakers
  - Dolph Schayes, Syracuse Nationals
- NBA Rookie of the Year
  - F/G Paul Arizin, Philadelphia Warriors

== See also ==
- List of NBA regular season records
