= 1950 NBA Finals =

1950 basketball championship series

Team	Coach	Wins
Minneapolis Lakers	John Kundla	4
Syracuse Nationals	Al Cervi	2
- Dates: April 8−23
- Hall of Famers: Lakers: George Mikan (1959); Jim Pollard (1978); Vern Mikkelsen (1995); Slater Martin (1982); Nationals: Dolph Schayes (1973); Alex Hannum (1998, coach); Al Cervi (1985); Coaches: John Kundla (1995); Al Cervi (1985, player); Officials: Pat Kennedy (1959); John Nucatola (1978)
- Eastern finals: Nationals defeated Knickerbockers, 2–1
- Western finals: Not the Western final (see text). Central finalist Lakers defeated Western finalist Packers, 2–0

The 1950 NBA World Championship Series was the championship round of the National Basketball Association (NBA)'s inaugural 1949–50 season following the merger of the National Basketball League (NBL) and the Basketball Association of America (BAA). The defending 1949 BAA champions and Central Division champions Minneapolis Lakers faced the Eastern Division champion Syracuse Nationals in a best-of-seven series with Syracuse having home-court advantage.

In the event, six games were played in 16 days, beginning Saturday and Sunday, April 8 and 9, in Syracuse and incorporating two subsequent Sunday games in Minneapolis. Counting a Central Division tiebreaker played on Monday, March 20, the entire postseason tournament spanned five full weeks to Sunday, April 23.

The NBA was arranged in three divisions (for its first season only) and the first two rounds of the 1950 NBA playoffs generated three Division champions. With the league's best regular season record, Syracuse had earned a place in the Finals by winning the Eastern Division title on the preceding Sunday, and had been five days idle while the Central and Western champions had played a best-of-three series mid-week.

In Game 1, the Lakers won on a buzzer beating shot by sub Bob "Tiger" Harrison, the first known case of a buzzer beater in the Finals. Six-foot-eight-inch (2.03 m) Dolph Schayes of Syracuse led his team out to the finals after a 16.8 ppg average during the regular season. George Mikan, however, averaged 27.4 ppg and led the league. Mikan would lead the Lakers past Syracuse in six games.

The championship was the Lakers third professional championship in a row after winning the NBL championship in 1948 and the BAA championship in 1949.

While the NBA was considered a new league at the time, it later retconned the three preceding BAA seasons as part of its own history, and thus presents the 1950 Finals as its fourth championship series.

== Series summary ==
Game	Date	Home team	Result	Road team
Game 1	April 8	Syracuse Nationals	66−68 (0−1)	Minneapolis Lakers
Game 2	April 9	Syracuse Nationals	91−85 (1−1)	Minneapolis Lakers
Game 3	April 14	Minneapolis Lakers	91−77 (2−1)	Syracuse Nationals
Game 4	April 16	Minneapolis Lakers	77−69 (3−1)	Syracuse Nationals
Game 5	April 20	Syracuse Nationals	83−76 (2−3)	Minneapolis Lakers
Game 6	April 23	Minneapolis Lakers	110−95 (4−2)	Syracuse Nationals

Lakers win series 4−2

== Rosters ==
=== Minneapolis Lakers ===
1949–50 Minneapolis Lakers roster
Players

Pos.	No.	Player	Height	Weight	DOB	From
G/F	15	Don Carlson	6 ft 0 in (1.83 m)	170 lb (77 kg)	1919–03–22	Minnesota
G/F	18	Arnie Ferrin	6 ft 2 in (1.88 m)	180 lb (82 kg)	1925-07-29	Utah
F	20	Bud Grant	6 ft 3 in (1.91 m)	195 lb (88 kg)	1927–05–20	Minnesota
G	16	Bob Harrison	6 ft 1 in (1.85 m)	190 lb (86 kg)	1927–08–12	Michigan
G	11	William Hassett	5 ft 11 in (1.80 m)	180 lb (82 kg)	1921-10-21	Notre Dame
G/F	13	Anthony Jaros	6 ft 3 in (1.91 m)	185 lb (84 kg)	1920–02–22	Minnesota
G	22	Slater Martin	5 ft 10 in (1.78 m)	170 lb (77 kg)	1925–10–22	Texas
C	99	George Mikan	6 ft 10 in (2.08 m)	245 lb (111 kg)	1924–06–18	DePaul
F	19	Arild Mikkelsen	6 ft 7 in (2.01 m)	230 lb (104 kg)	1928–10–21	Hamline
F	17	James Pollard	6 ft 4 in (1.93 m)	185 lb (84 kg)	1922–07–09	Stanford
G/F	10	Herman Schaefer	6 ft 0 in (1.83 m)	175 lb (79 kg)	1918–11–20	Indiana

Coaches
Head coach
- John Kundla

Legend
- (DP) Unsigned draft pick
- (FA) Free agent
- (S) Suspended
- Injured

Roster

=== Syracuse Nationals ===
1949–50 Syracuse Nationals roster
Players

Pos.	No.	Player	Height	Weight	DOB	From
G	15	Alfred Cervi	5 ft 11 in (1.80 m)	170 lb (77 kg)	1917–02–12	East HS (NY)
F	11	Leroy Chollet	6 ft 2 in (1.88 m)	190 lb (86 kg)	1925–03–05	Canisius
G	9	Raymond Corley	6 ft 0 in (1.83 m)	180 lb (82 kg)	1928–01–14	Georgetown
G	7	William Gabor	5 ft 11 in (1.80 m)	170 lb (77 kg)	1922–05–13	Syracuse
F	10	Alexander Hannum	6 ft 7 in (2.01 m)	210 lb (95 kg)	1923–07–19	USC
G	14	Andrew Levane	6 ft 2 in (1.88 m)	190 lb (86 kg)	1920–04–11	St. John's
G/F	5	John Macknowski	6 ft 0 in (1.83 m)	180 lb (82 kg)	1923–01–07	Seton Hall
C	13	Edward Peterson	6 ft 9 in (2.06 m)	220 lb (100 kg)	1924–06–27	Cornell
F	6	George Ratkovicz	6 ft 6 in (1.98 m)	220 lb (100 kg)	1922-11-13	Lindblom Academy (IL)
F/C	4	Adolph Schayes	6 ft 8 in (2.03 m)	220 lb (100 kg)	1928–05–19	NYU
G	8	Paul Seymour	6 ft 1 in (1.85 m)	180 lb (82 kg)	1928-01-30	Toledo

Coaches
Head coach
- Alfred Cervi

Legend
- (DP) Unsigned draft pick
- (FA) Free agent
- (S) Suspended
- Injured

Roster

== Box scores ==
April 8

Boxscore

Minneapolis Lakers 68, Syracuse Nationals 66
Scoring by quarter: 16–10, 18–20, 17–23, 17–13
Pts: George Mikan 37	Pts: Dolph Schayes 19
Minneapolis leads series, 1–0

State Fair Coliseum, Geddes, New York
Attendance: 7,552

- Bob Harrison hits the game-winning shot from 40 feet at the buzzer.

April 9

Boxscore

Minneapolis Lakers 85, Syracuse Nationals 91
Scoring by quarter: 17–16, 14–28, 22–23, 32–24
Pts: George Mikan 32	Pts: George Ratkovicz 17
Series tied, 1–1

State Fair Coliseum, Geddes, New York
Attendance: 8,280

April 14

Boxscore

Syracuse Nationals 77, Minneapolis Lakers 91
Scoring by quarter: 15–21, 24–21, 16–24, 22–25
Pts: Johnny Macknowski 25; Asts: Paul Seymour 5	Pts: George Mikan 28; Asts: George Mikan 8
Minneapolis leads series, 2–1

St. Paul Auditorium, Saint Paul, Minnesota
Attendance: 10,288

April 16

Boxscore

Syracuse Nationals 69, Minneapolis Lakers 77
Scoring by quarter: 22–27, 16–11, 19–24, 12–15
Pts: Schayes, Hannum 18 each Asts: Bill Gabor 6	Pts: George Mikan 28; Asts: Jim Pollard 4
Minneapolis leads series, 3–1

St. Paul Auditorium, Saint Paul, Minnesota
Attendance: 10,512

April 20

Boxscore

Minneapolis Lakers 76, Syracuse Nationals 83
Scoring by quarter: 16–14, 8–24, 19–23, 33–22
Pts: George Mikan 28	Pts: Dolph Schayes 19
Minneapolis leads series, 3–2

State Fair Coliseum, Geddes, New York
Attendance: 9,024

April 23

Boxscore

Syracuse Nationals 95, Minneapolis Lakers 110
Scoring by quarter: 18–25, 21–26, 17–30, 39–29
Pts: Dolph Schayes 23; Asts: Johnny Macknowski 5	Pts: George Mikan 40; Asts: Jim Pollard 10
Minneapolis wins series, 4–2

Minneapolis Auditorium, Minneapolis, Minnesota
Attendance: 9,812
Referees: Jim Biersdorf, John Nucatola
