= Leroy Chollet =

American basketball player (1925–1998)

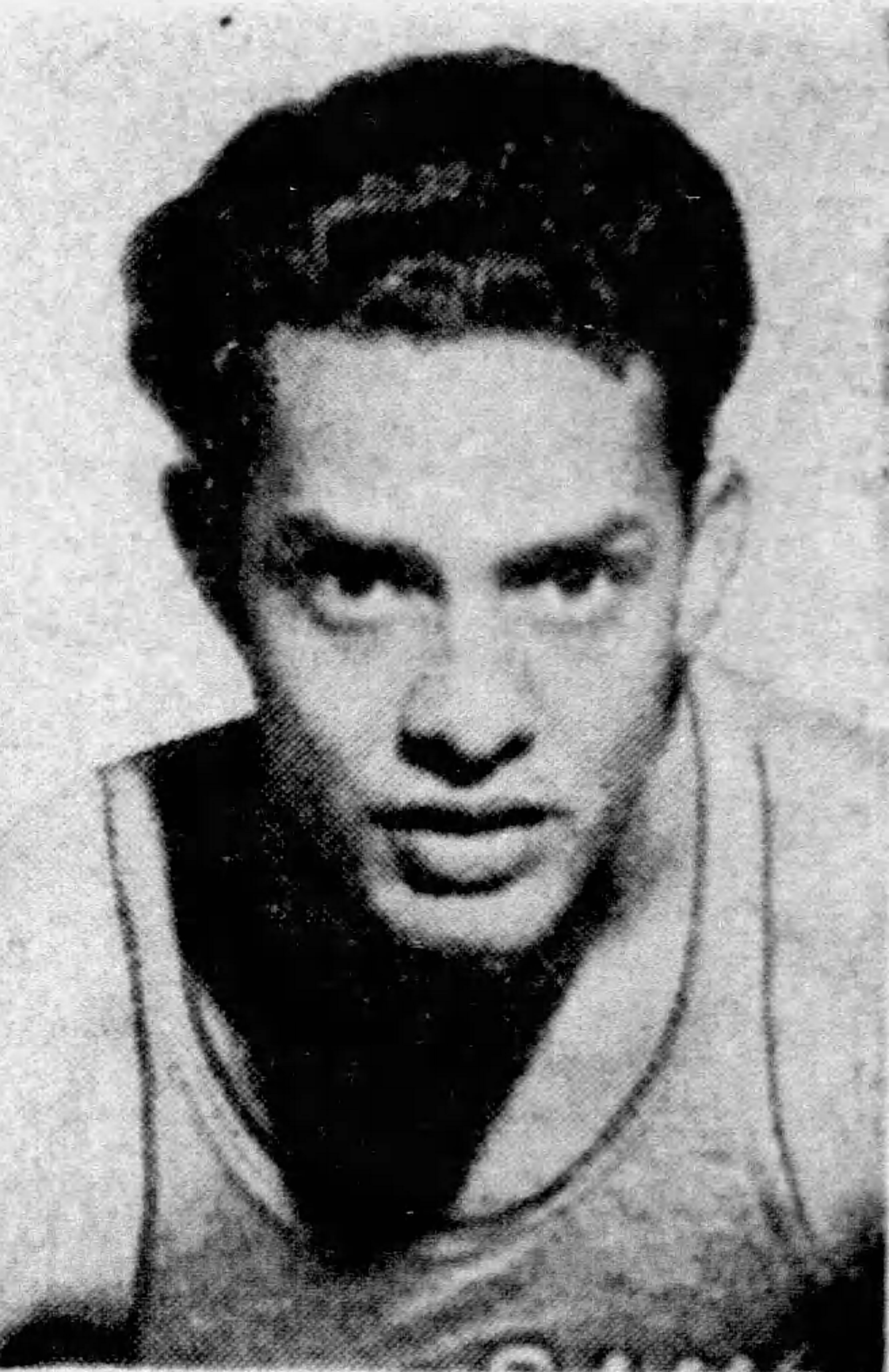
- Chollet at Canisius College in 1948

Personal information
- Born: March 5, 1925 New Orleans, Louisiana, U.S.
- Died: June 10, 1998 (aged 73) Rocky River, Ohio, U.S.
- Listed height: 6 ft 2 in (1.88 m)
- Listed weight: 190 lb (86 kg)

Career information
- High school: Holy Cross School (New Orleans, Louisiana)
- College: Loyola (Louisiana) (1944–1945); Canisius (1946–1949)
- Position: Forward
- Number: 9, 11

Career history
- 1949–1951: Syracuse Nationals
- 1950–1951: Utica Pros
- 1951–1952: Elmira Colonels

Career highlights
- NAIA champion (1945)
- Stats at NBA.com
- Stats at Basketball Reference

Leroy Patrick Chollet (March 5, 1925 – June 10, 1998) was an American professional basketball player. Chollet and his brothers attended Holy Cross School in New Orleans and excelled in sports. After a year in the United States Navy, Chollet enrolled at Loyola University New Orleans and led the Loyola Wolf Pack to their first NAIA men's basketball championship in 1945. Louisiana schools were segregated at the time. (Note: Loyola admitted only white students until the 1950s.) Chollet had an African American great-grandparent, and when this was revealed he was pressured into leaving Loyola. He moved to New York and played three seasons for Canisius College. In New York, he passed as white; Canisius would later claim Chollet to be the school's first African American basketball player.

Chollet played for several professional teams, including the Syracuse Nationals. During the inaugural season of the National Basketball Association (NBA), he became a role player behind established veterans, and the team made it to the 1950 NBA Finals. An ankle injury limited Chollet's second year in the NBA. The Elmira Colonels, an American Basketball League team, signed Chollet for his third and final season. He married Barbara Knaus in June 1950. After retiring from professional basketball in 1952, he moved to her hometown, Lakewood, Ohio. They had three children: Lawrence, Melanie, and David. In Lakewood, Chollet worked on the construction of St. Edward High School and became a teacher and varsity head coach. He was inducted into the Halls of Fame of Holy Cross School, Loyola University, and Canisius College. He died in 1998.

== Early life ==
Leroy Chollet was born to Olga and Alfred Chollet on March 5, 1925. He had one black great-grandparent, his paternal great-grandmother. By the standards of the time, this meant Leroy Chollet and his family were subject to racial segregation in the South. His parents moved from New Roads to New Orleans, where they passed as white.

Leroy, his younger brother Hillary, and his older brother Robert Alfred, known as "Al", grew up in Mid-City New Orleans. All three brothers attended Holy Cross School, which refused admission to black students. The brothers excelled at sports, and Leroy led the basketball team to consecutive state titles in 1942 and 1943.

== College career ==
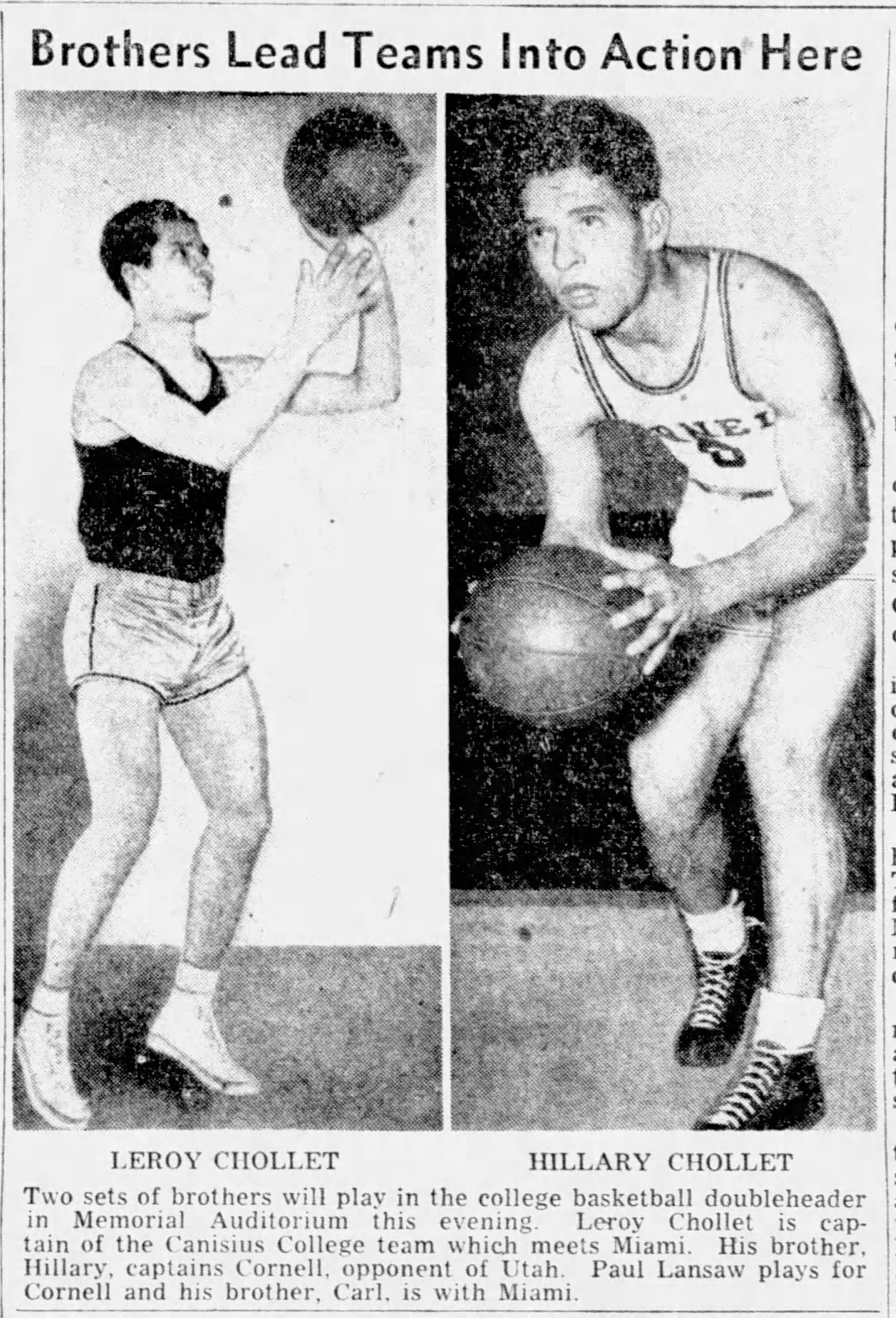
Brothers Leroy and Hillary Chollet played for Canisius and Cornell respectively, after they "were run out of" 1940s New Orleans for racial reasons.

Chollet served eleven months in the U.S. Navy before being discharged and moving on to college. He attended Loyola University in New Orleans from 1944 to 1945 as a student athlete, during a season that played out against the backdrop of World War II. Loyola alumni followed the team from overseas, writing battlefield letters back to the current players, and the school held Mass in memory of former students who were killed in action. The team faced traditional Dixie Conference opponents and armed forces teams from across the Southern United States. Military teams included Jackson Barracks in New Orleans, Foster General Hospital from Jackson, Mississippi, Camp Harahan, Bergstrom Army Air Field out of Austin, Texas, New Orleans Naval Air Station, Keesler Air Force Base from Biloxi, Mississippi, and the Gulfport Naval Training Center.

During his first year, Chollet led the Loyola Wolf Pack to Louisiana's first national basketball championship. After a slow start, he became the team's leading scorer. In the low-scoring semi-finals of the 1945 NAIA basketball tournament, Loyola fell behind 30–21 before Chollet and team captain John Casteix led the Wolf Pack on a late-game scoring run; they beat Southern Illinois by a single basket. In their final game, Loyola defeated Pepperdine University, with Chollet scoring a game-high 18 points.

His younger brother, Hillary Chollet, had become a high school football star, recruited by rival colleges Louisiana State University and Tulane. After Hillary chose Tulane, the family's genealogy came under increased scrutiny. Louisiana colleges were segregated and neither Tulane nor Loyola accepted black students at the time. Chollet's Wolf Pack teammates wanted him to stay at Loyola but could not influence the unfolding events. Loyola teammate, Sam Ciolino, later reflected, "The family left because you would get shut out of a lot of things if you were black. Today's a different environment altogether, but back then, it wasn't. I guarantee you the guys at Loyola didn't want him to leave. Leroy was the best-liked guy on our team." Another teammate, Jack Atchley, asked, "What could we do? We were just regular people". Amidst public rumors of their African American ancestry, the Chollet parents endured harassment, the family was ostracized socially, and both brothers were pushed out of New Orleans' white universities. According to journalist Mark Bernstein, their church made them "feel unwelcome", and "Tulane quietly suggested that Chollet might find it difficult to go there".

Hillary went out of state to Cornell University in Ithaca, New York. Leroy left Loyola and joined the United States Coast Guard. In 1946, he transferred to Canisius College, a private Jesuit college in Buffalo, New York. The rest of the family followed them to upstate New York. Al, the eldest Chollet brother, described the experience as "being run out of town". (Note: Loyola University has officially maintained that Leroy Chollet's transfer was due to academic reasons in statements as recently as 2007. Loyola University officials, Chollet family members, and Loyola alumni all agree that the family was "exiled from town" over race. Family members bitterly described the experience as being forced out of New Orleans. Older brother Al Chollet's daughter recalled that her father was "resentful about what he called 'being run out of town'".)

Chollet played three seasons for Canisius during an era of post-war growth for Western New York sports. Canisius sold out the Buffalo Memorial Auditorium for the first time, and the school played games in Madison Square Garden to audiences of over 17,000 fans. While Chollet was on the team, Louisiana State University traveled to New York twice and lost to Canisius both times. Canisius's 55–45 win over Baylor was the first televised basketball game in Western New York. Chollet became the school's first player to total 1,000 points. In 1949, Chollet scored 14 points to push the school record to 1,116 total points in the final game of his senior season. (Note: In their March 18 post-game reporting, the Press and Sun-Bulletin credited Chollet with "a three-year mark of 1,117" total points. The school officially credits him with 1,116 total points.)

In New York, the Chollet family again passed as white. Louisiana newspapers did not publish information on their ancestry, and the family was not a part of the local black community. Canisius later claimed Leroy Chollet as their first African American basketball player. Chollet was inducted into the Canisius Hall of Fame in 1964, and the Loyola Athletic Hall of Fame in 1993.

== Professional career ==
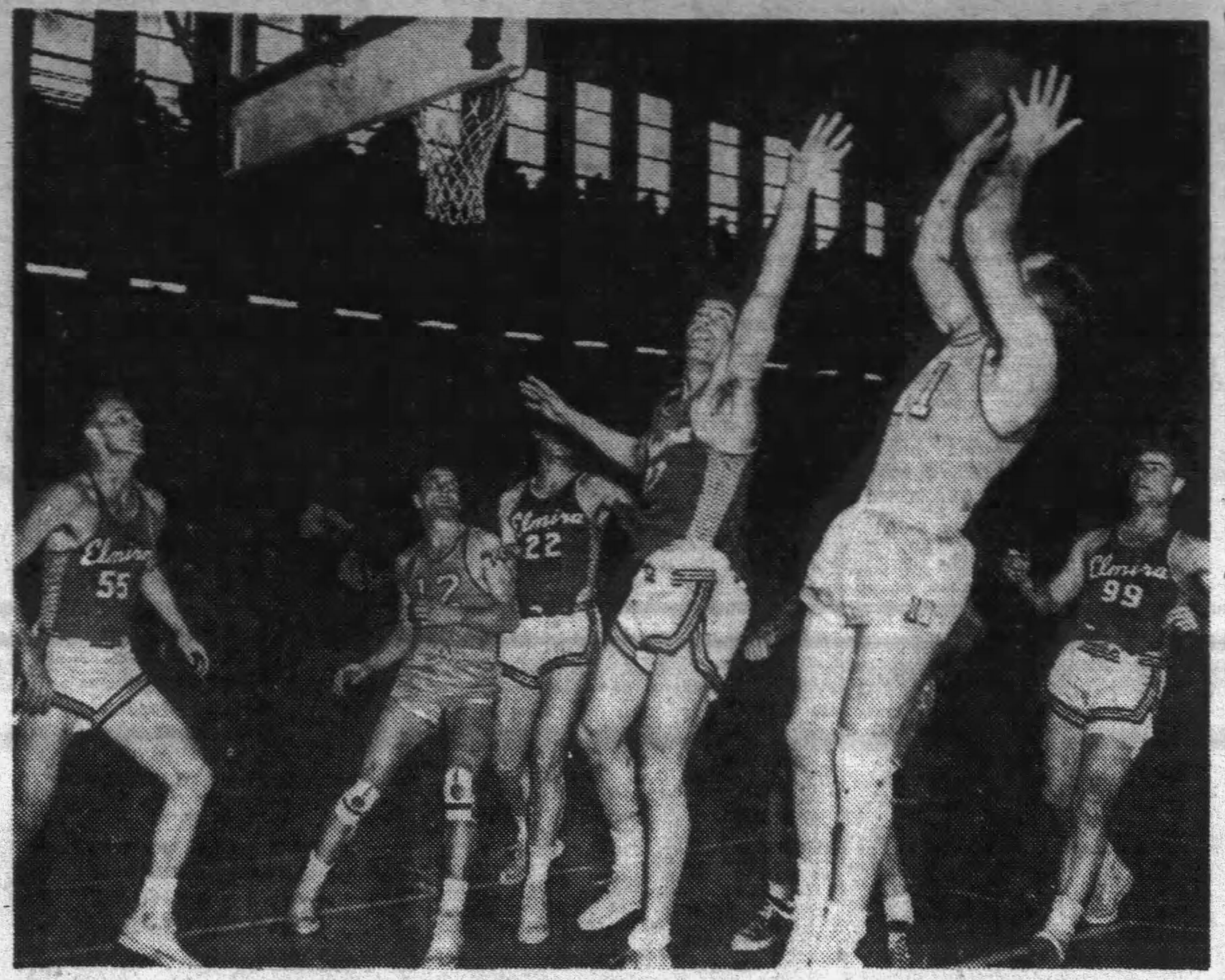
Leroy Chollet (center) contesting a shot from Danny Finn in the ABL

Chollet signed with the Syracuse Nationals for the NBA's 1949–50 inaugural season, after the Basketball Association of America (BAA) and National Basketball League (NBL) merged. (Note: The existing BAA and NBL merged prior to Chollet's rookie season. The BAA incorporated the remaining NBL teams, including Syracuse, into the newly formed NBA. The NBA subsequently claimed the BAA's three seasons of existence as canonical NBA history.) In the NBA's early days, the most successful franchises were the smaller Midwest teams that had originated in the NBL. Syracuse was one of the league's smallest markets. The NBA was ostensibly a white league at the beginning, with Wataru Misaka, an American of Japanese descent, the only openly non-white player. (Note: The NBA and preceding BAA barred entry to African Americans. The Syracuse Nationals originated in the NBL, which had an integrated team as early as 1935. The NBL teams had merged into the NBA by the time that Syracuse signed Chollet.)

The Nationals gave Chollet a more limited role, bringing him off the bench behind their established guards. He was no longer a primary scoring option and was asked only to shoot if left open. His role in Syracuse was to set up plays and distribute the ball to the team's veteran players. The Nationals were led by future Basketball Hall of Famer Dolph Schayes, all-star Billy Gabor, and player-coach Al "The Digger" Cervi. Syracuse made it to the first NBA Finals in 1950 but fell to the Minneapolis Lakers in six games.

During his first season with the Nationals, Chollet feuded with Al Cervi over playing time. Chollet told Cervi that he would make a better coach during an argument. When Cervi responded by making Chollet coach for a game, the rookie benched his own coach. According to teammate Alex Hannum, "Chollet did not send Cervi in until the last 30 seconds or so—about the usual time Cervi sent in Leroy."

"One game [Cervi] got so fed up with me he said, 'You coach the team,' He had this habit of naming the starting lineup in the huddle before a game. He'd say 'Schayes, Hannum ... and Cervi,' then run on the court so nobody could say anything. So I did the same thing. 'Schayes, Hannum ... and Chollet.' We won that game, too."

— Leroy Chollet

Chollet began his second pro season as player–coach of the Utica Pros, an American Basketball League team that farmed players to larger NBA teams including the Nationals and the New York Knicks. Chollet became a top scorer in the ABL; he was recalled by Syracuse mid-season, but barely played after an early ankle injury. His third and final season of professional basketball was with another ABL team, the Elmira Colonels. During the 1951–1952 season, he announced that he was retiring from professional basketball to seek a stable coaching position.

== Later life ==
Chollet married Barbara Knaus in June 1950. After he retired from professional basketball, they moved to her hometown, Lakewood, Ohio. The couple had three children: Lawrence, Melanie, and David. Upon learning of a new Catholic school being built in Lakewood, St. Edward High School, Chollet got a construction job there. After construction was completed, St. Edwards hired him as a teacher and coach. Chollet was the high school's varsity head coach from 1956 to 1960. He was an administrator for community sports programs at the Lakewood Recreation Department from 1960 to 1980 and tended bar at Kluck's, a local landmark. He retired from teaching in 1985. Chollet died from amyotrophic lateral sclerosis in 1998 and was buried at Milan Cemetery in Milan, Ohio. He was posthumously inducted in the Holy Cross Hall of Fame.

== Career statistics ==
Legend
GP	Games played	GS	Games started	MPG	Minutes per game
FG%	Field goal percentage	3P%	3-point field goal percentage	FT%	Free throw percentage
RPG	Rebounds per game	APG	Assists per game	SPG	Steals per game
BPG	Blocks per game	PPG	Points per game	**Bold**	Career high

=== NBA ===
==== Regular season ====
Year	Team	GP	FG%	FT%	RPG	APG	PPG
1949–50	Syracuse	**49**	**.341**	.625	–	.8	**3.2**
1950–51	Syracuse	14	.118	**.632**	1.1	**.9**	1.7
Career		63	.291	.627	1.1	8	2.9

^{Source:}

==== Playoffs ====
Year	Team	GP	FG%	FT%	RPG	APG	PPG
1950	Syracuse	**8**	**.269**	.385	–	.5	**2.4**
1951	Syracuse	7	.174	**.625**	2.3	**1.3**	1.9
Career		15	.224	.476	2.3	.9	2.1

^{Source:}

=== College ===
Year	School	GP	FG%	FT%	PPG
1944–45	Loyola	22	–	–	14.8
1946–47	Canisius	**31**	.327	.661	12.3
1947–48	Canisius	25	.308	.681	12.7
1948–49	Canisius	28	**.344**	**.700**	**14.9**
Career		110	.327	.682	13.1

^{Sources:}^{,}
