= 1950 NBA playoffs =

Postseason tournament

Tournament details
- Dates: March 20 – April 23, 1950
- Season: 1949–50
- Teams: 12

Final positions
- Champions: Minneapolis Lakers (2nd title)
- Runners-up: Syracuse Nationals

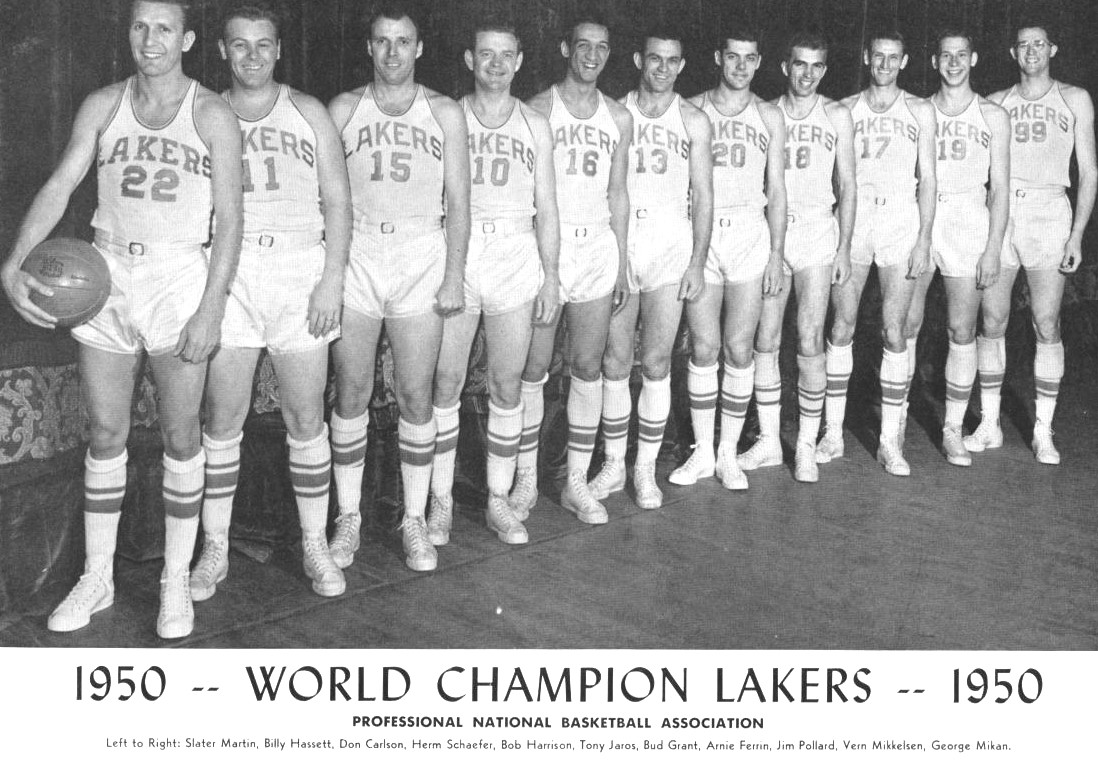
The 1949-50 NBA champion Minneapolis Lakers.

The 1950 NBA playoffs was the postseason tournament of the inaugural National Basketball Association 1949–50 season. The tournament concluded with the Central Division champion Minneapolis Lakers defeating the Eastern Division champion Syracuse Nationals 4 games to 2 in the NBA Finals.

Twelve teams qualified for the playoffs. Including tiebreaker games that preceded two of the six first-round series, they began play on Monday to Wednesday, March 20 to 22, and the best-of-seven Finals concluded in game six on Sunday, April 23. The champions played the greatest number of games, 13 in a span of 34 days, on a schedule including both back-to-back games and as many as six days off.

== Bracket ==
The NBA was created in 1949 by merger of two competing professional basketball leagues, the BAA and NBL. For its first season only, the NBA teams were arranged in three divisions: Eastern, comprising the five surviving BAA Eastern Division teams plus Syracuse from the NBL; Central, comprising the five surviving BAA Western Division teams; and Western, comprising all the NBL teams except Syracuse. Within each division the top four teams were matched in two rounds of short series to generate a champion, after which the three division champions contended for the NBA title. With three contenders the third round of the tournament comprised a bye for one and a best-of-three match between the other two.

Division Semifinals
E1	Syracuse*	2
E4	Philadelphia	0
Eastern Division
E3	Washington	0
E2	New York	2
C1	Minneapolis*	2
C4	Chicago	0
Central Division
C3	Fort Wayne	2
C2	Rochester	0
W1	Indianapolis*	2
W4	Sheboygan	1
Western Division
W3	Tri-Cities	1
W2	Anderson	2

Division Finals
E1	Syracuse*	2
E2	New York	1
C1	Minneapolis*	2
C3	Fort Wayne	0
W1	Indianapolis*	1
W2	Anderson	2

NBA Semifinals
3	Anderson	0
2	Minneapolis	2

NBA Finals
1	Syracuse	2
2	Minneapolis	4

- * Division winner
- Bold Series winner

== Division Tiebreakers ==
=== Central Division Tiebreakers ===
==== Chicago Stags @ Fort Wayne Pistons ====
March 20

Boxscore

Chicago Stags 69, Fort Wayne Pistons 86
Scoring by quarter: 21–22, 14–24, 12–16, 22–24
Pts: Max Zaslofsky 14; Asts: Phillip, Kudelka 4 each	Pts: Fred Schaus 18; Asts: Fred Schaus 6
Fort Wayne finishes as the Central's #3 seed, Chicago as the Central's #4 seed

North Side High School Gym, Fort Wayne, Indiana
Referees: Pat Kennedy, Jim Beiersdorfer

==== Minneapolis Lakers @ Rochester Royals ====
March 21

Boxscore

Minneapolis Lakers 78, Rochester Royals 76
Scoring by quarter: 20–23, 16–20, 20–16, 22–17
Pts: George Mikan 35; Asts: Herm Schaefer 7	Pts: Bob Davies 26; Asts: Bob Davies 6
Minneapolis finishes as the Central's #1 seed, Rochester as the Central's #2 seed

Edgerton Park Arena, Rochester, New York
Referees: Pat Kennedy, Eddie Boyle

== Division Semifinals ==
=== Central Division Semifinals ===
==== (1) Minneapolis Lakers vs. (4) Chicago Stags ====
March 22

Boxscore

Chicago Stags 75, Minneapolis Lakers 85
Scoring by quarter: 17–22, 18–17, 16–20, 24–26
Pts: Leo Barnhorst 17; Asts: Andy Phillip 4	Pts: George Mikan 30; Asts: George Mikan 3
Minneapolis leads series, 1–0

Minneapolis Auditorium, Minneapolis, Minnesota

March 25

Boxscore

Minneapolis Lakers 75, Chicago Stags 67
Scoring by quarter: 19–17, 19–17, 18–16, 19–17
Pts: George Mikan 34	Pts: Max Zaslofsky 31
Minneapolis wins series, 2–0

Chicago Stadium, Chicago, Illinois

This was the second playoff meeting between these two teams, with the Lakers winning the first meeting. (Note: Notes identifying the "last playoff meeting" (latest previous meeting) or "first playoff meeting" between two teams refer to BAA and NBA playoffs only—for this inaugural NBA season, that is, only to the BAA playoffs of 1946–47 to 1948–49. (This follows NBA recognition of BAA history as part of its own.) All of the Western teams were new to the NBA; so was Syracuse, which participated in all but one of the Eastern playoff matches. As Syracuse advanced from the East, two of the three division champions who composed the two-round League Finals were new to the NBA. Furthermore, only Chicago among the three Central Division playoff teams had been a member of the BAA for more than one season (compare 1947–48) as the other three had moved from NBL to BAA in 1948.)

Previous playoff series
Minneapolis leads 1–0 in all-time playoff series

1949

Chicago Stags 0, Minneapolis Lakers 2

1949 Western Division Semifinals

==== (2) Rochester Royals vs. (3) Fort Wayne Pistons ====
March 23

Boxscore

Fort Wayne Pistons 90, Rochester Royals 84
Scoring by quarter: 22–15, 26–20, 18–20, 24–29
Pts: Wager, Schaefer 18 each	Pts: three players 15 each
Fort Wayne leads series, 1–0

Edgerton Park Arena, Rochester, New York

March 24

Boxscore

Rochester Royals 78, Fort Wayne Pistons 79 (OT)
Scoring by quarter: 21–17, 11–23, 21–19, 17–11, Overtime: 8–9
Pts: Arnie Risen 17	Pts: Bob Carpenter 27
Fort Wayne wins series, 2–0

North Side High School Gym, Fort Wayne, Indiana

This was the first playoff meeting between these two teams.

=== Eastern Division Semifinals ===
==== (1) Syracuse Nationals vs. (4) Philadelphia Warriors ====
March 22

Boxscore

Philadelphia Warriors 76, Syracuse Nationals 93
Scoring by quarter: 24–20, 14–28, 17–19, 21–26
Pts: Chink Crossin 20; Asts: Al Guokas 4	Pts: George Ratkovicz 25; Asts: Dolph Schayes 6
Syracuse leads series, 1–0

State Fair Coliseum, Geddes, New York

March 23

Boxscore

Syracuse Nationals 59, Philadelphia Warriors 53
Scoring by quarter: 16–12, 10–19, 13–13, 20–9
Pts: Dolph Schayes 16; Asts: Al Cervi 2	Pts: Vern Gardner 17; Asts: Leo Mogus 4
Syracuse wins series, 2–0

Philadelphia Arena, Philadelphia, Pennsylvania

This was the first playoff meeting between these two teams.

==== (2) New York Knicks vs. (3) Washington Capitols ====
March 21

Boxscore

New York Knicks 90, Washington Capitols 87
Scoring by quarter: 26–25, 16–20, 21–19, 27–23
Pts: Carl Braun 26; Asts: Carl Braun 6	Pts: Fred Scolari 23; Asts: Don Otten 4
New York leads series, 1–0

Uline Arena, Washington, D.C.
Referees: Jocko Collins, Sam Schoenfeld

March 22

Boxscore

Washington Capitols 83, New York Knicks 103
Scoring by quarter: 21–25, 21–26, 21–24, 20–28
Pts: Don Otten 21; Asts: three players 3 each	Pts: Harry Gallatin 20; Asts: Dick McGuire 6
New York wins series, 2–0

Madison Square Garden III, Manhattan, New York

This was the second playoff meeting between these two teams, with the Capitols winning the first meeting.

Previous playoff series
Washington leads 1–0 in all-time playoff series

1949

New York Knicks 1, Washington Capitols 2

1949 Eastern Division Finals

=== Western Division Semifinals ===
==== (1) Indianapolis Olympians vs. (4) Sheboygan Red Skins ====
March 21

Boxscore

Sheboygan Red Skins 85, Indianapolis Olympians 86
Scoring by quarter: 24–23, 15–22, 25–14, 21–27
Pts: Jack Burmaster 19	Pts: Ralph Beard 17
Indianapolis leads series, 1–0

Butler Fieldhouse, Indianapolis, Indiana

March 23

Boxscore

Indianapolis Olympians 85, Sheboygan Red Skins 95
Scoring by quarter: 31–21, 22–28, 15–20, 17–26
Pts: Alex Groza 26	Pts: Bob Brannum 17
Series tied, 1–1

Sheboygan Municipal Auditorium and Armory, Sheboygan, Wisconsin

March 25

Boxscore

Sheboygan Red Skins 84, Indianapolis Olympians 91
Scoring by quarter: 22–27, 18–19, 28–19, 16–26
Pts: Noble Jorgensen 20	Pts: Alex Groza 30
Indianapolis wins series, 2–1

Butler Fieldhouse, Indianapolis, Indiana

This was the first playoff meeting between these two teams.

==== (2) Anderson Packers vs. (3) Tri-Cities Blackhawks ====
March 21

Boxscore

Tri-Cities Blackhawks 77, Anderson Packers 89
Scoring by quarter: 17–20, 21–15, 19–21, 20–33
Pts: Jack Nichols 27	Pts: Red Owens 19
Anderson leads series, 1–0

Anderson High School Wigwam, Anderson, Indiana

March 23

Boxscore

Anderson Packers 75, Tri-Cities Blackhawks 76
Scoring by quarter: 9–13, 12–18, 22–21, 32–24
Pts: Frankie Brian 26	Pts: Jack Nichols 23
Series tied, 1–1

Wharton Field House, Moline, Illinois

March 24

Boxscore

Tri-Cities Blackhawks 71, Anderson Packers 94
Scoring by quarter: 21–22, 18–25, 11–26, 21–21
Pts: Dike Eddleman 23	Pts: John Hargis 21
Anderson wins series, 2–1

Anderson High School Wigwam, Anderson, Indiana

This was the first playoff meeting between these two teams.

== Division Finals ==
=== Central Division Finals ===
==== (1) Minneapolis Lakers vs. (3) Fort Wayne Pistons ====
March 27

Boxscore

Fort Wayne Pistons 79, Minneapolis Lakers 93
Scoring by quarter: 14–19, 14–30, 19–16, 32–28
Pts: Fred Schaus 20; Asts: Fred Schaus 4	Pts: George Mikan 24; Asts: George Mikan 4
Minneapolis leads series, 1–0

Minneapolis Auditorium, Minneapolis, Minnesota

March 28

Boxscore

Minneapolis Lakers 89, Fort Wayne Pistons 82
Scoring by quarter: 20–18, 26–20, 19–18, 24–26
Pts: George Mikan 37	Pts: Fred Schaus 33
Minneapolis wins series, 2–0

North Side High School Gym, Fort Wayne, Indiana

This was the first playoff meeting between these two teams.

=== Eastern Division Finals ===
==== (1) Syracuse Nationals vs. (2) New York Knicks ====
March 26

Boxscore

New York Knicks 83, Syracuse Nationals 91 (OT)
Scoring by half: 42–36, 35–41 Overtime: 6–14
Pts: Carl Braun 22; Asts: Carl Braun 4	Pts: Dolph Schayes 26; Asts: Andrew Levane 4
Syracuse leads series, 1–0

State Fair Coliseum, Geddes, New York

March 30

Boxscore

Syracuse Nationals 76, New York Knicks 80
Scoring by half: 33–42, 43–38
Pts: George Ratkovicz 17; Asts: Al Cervi 4	Pts: Vince Boryla 21; Asts: Dick McGuire 7
Series tied, 1–1

Madison Square Garden III, Manhattan, New York

April 2

Boxscore

New York Knicks 80, Syracuse Nationals 91
Scoring by half: 42–45, 38–46
Pts: Gallatin, Vandeweghe 17 each Asts: Dick McGuire 5	Pts: Dolph Schayes 24; Asts: Schayes, Cervi 3 each
Syracuse wins series, 2–1

State Fair Coliseum, Geddes, New York

This was the first playoff meeting between these two teams.

=== Western Division Finals ===
==== (1) Indianapolis Olympians vs. (2) Anderson Packers ====
March 28

Boxscore

Anderson Packers 74, Indianapolis Olympians 77
Scoring by quarter: 19–16, 19–21, 20–17, 16–23
Pts: Milo Komenich 14	Pts: Alex Groza 31
Indianapolis leads series, 1–0

Butler Fieldhouse, Indianapolis, Indiana

March 30

Boxscore

Indianapolis Olympians 67, Anderson Packers 84
Scoring by quarter: 23–15, 11–21, 20–25, 13–23
Pts: Joe Holland 14	Pts: three players 13 each
Series tied, 1–1

Anderson High School Wigwam, Anderson, Indiana

April 1

Boxscore

Anderson Packers 67, Indianapolis Olympians 65
Scoring by quarter: 17–18, 12–12, 18–14, 20–21
Pts: Frankie Brian 14	Pts: Alex Groza 26
Anderson wins series, 2–1

Butler Fieldhouse, Indianapolis, Indiana

This was the first playoff meeting between these two teams.

== NBA Semifinals: (2) Minneapolis Lakers vs. (3) Anderson Packers ==
April 5

Boxscore

Anderson Packers 50, Minneapolis Lakers 75
Scoring by half: 19–27, 31–48
Pts: Bill Closs 12; Asts: three players 2 each	Pts: George Mikan 26; Asts: Jim Pollard 5
Minneapolis leads series, 1–0

Minneapolis Auditorium, Minneapolis, Minnesota
Attendance: 6,136

April 6

Boxscore

Minneapolis Lakers 90, Anderson Packers 71
Scoring by quarter: 25–21, 18–22, 21–8, 26–20
Pts: George Mikan 32	Pts: Bill Closs 16
Minneapolis wins series, 2–0

Anderson High School Wigwam, Anderson, Indiana

This was the first playoff meeting between these two teams.

== NBA Finals: (1) Syracuse Nationals vs. (2) Minneapolis Lakers ==
April 8

Boxscore

Minneapolis Lakers 68, Syracuse Nationals 66
Scoring by quarter: 16–10, 18–20, 17–23, 17–13
Pts: George Mikan 37	Pts: Dolph Schayes 19
Minneapolis leads series, 1–0

State Fair Coliseum, Geddes, New York
Attendance: 7,552

- Bob Harrison hits the game-winning shot from 40 feet at the buzzer.

April 9

Boxscore

Minneapolis Lakers 85, Syracuse Nationals 91
Scoring by quarter: 17–16, 14–28, 22–23, 32–24
Pts: George Mikan 32	Pts: George Ratkovicz 17
Series tied, 1–1

State Fair Coliseum, Geddes, New York
Attendance: 8,280

April 14

Boxscore

Syracuse Nationals 77, Minneapolis Lakers 91
Scoring by quarter: 15–21, 24–21, 16–24, 22–25
Pts: Johnny Macknowski 25; Asts: Paul Seymour 5	Pts: George Mikan 28; Asts: George Mikan 8
Minneapolis leads series, 2–1

St. Paul Auditorium, Saint Paul, Minnesota
Attendance: 10,288

April 16

Boxscore

Syracuse Nationals 69, Minneapolis Lakers 77
Scoring by quarter: 22–27, 16–11, 19–24, 12–15
Pts: Schayes, Hannum 18 each Asts: Bill Gabor 6	Pts: George Mikan 28; Asts: Jim Pollard 4
Minneapolis leads series, 3–1

St. Paul Auditorium, Saint Paul, Minnesota
Attendance: 10,512

April 20

Boxscore

Minneapolis Lakers 76, Syracuse Nationals 83
Scoring by quarter: 16–14, 8–24, 19–23, 33–22
Pts: George Mikan 28	Pts: Dolph Schayes 19
Minneapolis leads series, 3–2

State Fair Coliseum, Geddes, New York
Attendance: 9,024

April 23

Boxscore

Syracuse Nationals 95, Minneapolis Lakers 110
Scoring by quarter: 18–25, 21–26, 17–30, 39–29
Pts: Dolph Schayes 23; Asts: Johnny Macknowski 5	Pts: George Mikan 40; Asts: Jim Pollard 10
Minneapolis wins series, 4–2

Minneapolis Auditorium, Minneapolis, Minnesota
Attendance: 9,812
Referees: Jim Biersdorf, John Nucatola

This was the first playoff meeting between these two teams.
