= 1950–51 Syracuse Nationals season =

NBA professional basketball team season

- Head coach: Al Cervi
- Arena: State Fair Coliseum

Results
- Record: 32–34 (.485)
- Place: Division: 4th (Atlantic)
- Playoff finish: East Division Finals (Eliminated 2–3)
- Stats at Basketball Reference
- Radio: WNDR

The 1950–51 Syracuse Nationals season was the 5th season of the franchise and their second in the National Basketball Association (NBA). In the regular season, the Nationals finished in fourth place in the Eastern Division and their 32–34 record gave them an NBA playoffs berth. One match on November 19 against the New York Knicks had them inadvertently successfully rig a match against the Knicks by NBA referee Sol Levy's favor, which later led to his arrest for his crime alongside being an accomplice in the CCNY point-shaving scandal of 1951. Syracuse faced the Philadelphia Warriors in the first round of the Eastern Division playoffs and won the best-of-three series, 2–0, to advance to the division finals. In that series, the Nationals lost to the New York Knicks, 2–3, in a best-of-five series.

== NBA draft ==
Round	Pick	Player	Position	Nationality	School/Club team
1	11	Don Lofgran	F/C	United States	San Francisco
2	23	Gerald Calabrese	G	United States	St. John's

== Roster ==
Syracuse Nationals 1950–51 roster
Players
Coaches

Pos.	#	Name	Ht.	Wt.	From
SG	12	Gerald Calabrese	6 ft 1 in (1.85 m)	175 lb (79 kg)		St. John's
PG	15	Al Cervi	5 ft 11 in (1.80 m)	170 lb (77 kg)		East HS (NY)
F	11	Leroy Chollet	6 ft 2 in (1.88 m)	190 lb (86 kg)		Canisius
SG	7	Billy Gabor	5 ft 11 in (1.80 m)	170 lb (77 kg)		Syracuse
PF	10	Alex Hannum	6 ft 7 in (2.01 m)	210 lb (95 kg)		USC
C	13	Noble Jorgensen	6 ft 9 in (2.06 m)	228 lb (103 kg)		Iowa
F/C	11	Don Lofgran	6 ft 5 in (1.96 m)	200 lb (91 kg)		San Francisco
G/F	5	Johnny Macknowski	6 ft 0 in (1.83 m)	180 lb (82 kg)		Seton Hall
C	13	Ed Peterson	6 ft 9 in (2.06 m)	220 lb (100 kg)		Cornell
PF	6	George Ratkovicz	6 ft 6 in (1.98 m)	220 lb (100 kg)		Lindblom HS (IL)
F/C	4	Dolph Schayes	6 ft 8 in (2.03 m)	220 lb (100 kg)		NYU
PG	14	Fred Scolari	5 ft 10 in (1.78 m)	180 lb (82 kg)		San Francisco
G/F	8	Paul Seymour	6 ft 1 in (1.85 m)	180 lb (82 kg)		Toledo
SG	14	Belus Smawley	6 ft 1 in (1.85 m)	195 lb (88 kg)		Appalachian State

Head coach
- Al Cervi

Legend
- (DP) Unsigned draft pick
- (FA) Free agent
- (S) Suspended
- Injured

== Regular season ==
=== Standings ===
Eastern Division	W	L	PCT	GB	Home	Road	Neutral	Div
x-Philadelphia Warriors	40	26	.606	–	28–4	11–21	1–1	22–14
x-Boston Celtics	39	30	.565	1	25–5	10–23	4–2	21–19
x-New York Knicks	36	30	.545	4	22–5	10–25	4–0	21–15
x-Syracuse Nationals	32	34	.485	8	23–10	9–24	–	19–17
Baltimore Bullets	24	42	.364	16	20–12	4–24	0–6	12–24
Washington Capitols†	10	25	.286	30	7–12	3–12	0–1	6–12

=== Game log ===
1950–51 Game Log
Total: 32–34 (Home: 23–10; Road: 9–24)
November: 7–7 (Home: 6–2; Road: 1–5)

Game	Date	Opponent	Score	Location	High points	Record
1	November 2	Fort Wayne Pistons	92–77	State Fair Coliseum	George Ratkovicz (23)	1–0
2	November 5	Minneapolis Lakers	90–87	State Fair Coliseum	Paul Seymour (18)	2–0
3	November 9	Tri-Cities Blackhawks	89–70	State Fair Coliseum	Dolph Schayes (15)	3–0
4	November 11	@ New York Knicks	72–74 (OT)	Madison Square Garden	Dolph Schayes (20)	3–1
5	November 12	Baltimore Bullets	83–57	State Fair Coliseum	Paul Seymour (16)	4–1
6	November 14	@ Indianapolis Olympians	78–108	Butler Fieldhouse	Belus Smawley (15)	4–2
7	November 15	@ Minneapolis Lakers	71–72 (OT)	Minneapolis Auditorium	Belus Smawley (16)	4–3
8	November 16	@ Tri-Cities Blackhawks	75–79	Wharton Field House	Ed Peterson (19)	4–4
9	November 19	New York Knicks	96–83	State Fair Coliseum	Belus Smawley (14)	5–4
10	November 23	Indianapolis Olympians	85–92	State Fair Coliseum	Gabor, Hannum (17)	5–5
11	November 25	@ Washington Capitols	77–67	Uline Arena	Billy Gabor (17)	6–5
12	November 26	Washington Capitols	90–76	State Fair Coliseum	Billy Gabor (22)	7–5
13	November 28	@ New York Knicks	84–108	Madison Square Garden	Dolph Schayes (25)	7–6
14	November 30	@ Philadelphia Warriors	78–81	Philadelphia Arena	George Ratkovicz (17)	7–7

December: 7–7 (Home: 3–3; Road: 4–4)

Game	Date	Opponent	Score	Location	High points	Record
15	December 2	@ Baltimore Bullets	99–96 (OT)	Baltimore Coliseum	Billy Gabor (31)	8–7
16	December 3	Indianapolis Olympians	84–81	State Fair Coliseum	Cervi, Schayes (16)	9–7
17	December 7	Rochester Royals	69–76	State Fair Coliseum	Dolph Schayes (27)	9–8
18	December 9	@ Boston Celtics	86–85	Boston Garden	Don Lofgran (19)	10–8
19	December 10	Baltimore Bullets	76–86	State Fair Coliseum	Dolph Schayes (16)	10–9
20	December 14	Tri-Cities Blackhawks	69–78	State Fair Coliseum	Al Cervi (15)	10–10
21	December 16	@ Rochester Royals	79–75 (OT)	Edgerton Park Arena	Billy Gabor (24)	11–10
22	December 17	New York Knicks	95–86	State Fair Coliseum	Dolph Schayes (23)	12–10
23	December 20	@ Tri-Cities Blackhawks	83–86	Wharton Field House	Al Cervi (19)	12–11
24	December 21	@ Fort Wayne Pistons	72–97	North Side High School Gym	Dolph Schayes (17)	12–12
25	December 25	Fort Wayne Pistons	81–69	State Fair Coliseum	Dolph Schayes (16)	13–12
26	December 26	@ Boston Celtics	100–102	Boston Garden	Noble Jorgensen (23)	13–13
27	December 28	@ Philadelphia Warriors	88–91 (OT)	Philadelphia Arena	Dolph Schayes (28)	13–14
28	December 30	@ Baltimore Bullets	90–80 (OT)	Baltimore Coliseum	Dolph Schayes (23)	14–14

January: 7–7 (Home: 5–3; Road: 2–4)

Game	Date	Opponent	Score	Location	High points	Record
29	January 1	Boston Celtics	106–89	State Fair Coliseum	Dolph Schayes (21)	15–14
30	January 4	Minneapolis Lakers	77–80	State Fair Coliseum	Billy Gabor (20)	15–15
31	January 6	@ New York Knicks	87–85 (OT)	Madison Square Garden	Dolph Schayes (26)	16–15
32	January 7	Baltimore Bullets	73–65	State Fair Coliseum	George Ratkovicz (18)	17–15
33	January 10	@ Tri-Cities Blackhawks	97–96	Wharton Field House	Ratkovicz, Schayes (20)	18–15
34	January 11	@ Fort Wayne Pistons	76–84	North Side High School Gym	Dolph Schayes (16)	18–16
35	January 14	Rochester Royals	92–63	State Fair Coliseum	Dolph Schayes (17)	19–16
36	January 18	Rochester Royals	87–96	State Fair Coliseum	George Ratkovicz (20)	19–17
37	January 21	Philadelphia Warriors	86–96	State Fair Coliseum	Noble Jorgensen (18)	19–18
38	January 24	@ Baltimore Bullets	82–87	Baltimore Coliseum	George Ratkovicz (23)	19–19
39	January 25	Tri-Cities Blackhawks	113–87	State Fair Coliseum	George Ratkovicz (24)	20–19
40	January 27	@ Rochester Royals	83–85	Edgerton Park Arena	Dolph Schayes (24)	20–20
41	January 28	Boston Celtics	104–83	State Fair Coliseum	Dolph Schayes (22)	21–20
42	January 30	@ Boston Celtics	87–96	Boston Garden	Dolph Schayes (23)	21–21

February: 7–7 (Home: 5–2; Road: 2–5)

Game	Date	Opponent	Score	Location	High points	Record
43	February 1	New York Knicks	90–93	State Fair Coliseum	Dolph Schayes (26)	21–22
44	February 2	@ Boston Celtics	90–96 (OT)	Boston Garden	Dolph Schayes (19)	21–23
45	February 5	Philadelphia Warriors	78–75	State Fair Coliseum	Dolph Schayes (19)	22–23
46	February 7	@ Baltimore Bullets	82–102	Baltimore Coliseum	Johnny Macknowski (20)	22–24
47	February 8	New York Knicks	96–83	State Fair Coliseum	George Ratkovicz (19)	23–24
48	February 11	Baltimore Bullets	80–72	State Fair Coliseum	Dolph Schayes (18)	24–24
49	February 14	@ Fort Wayne Pistons	75–77	North Side High School Gym	Dolph Schayes (18)	24–25
50	February 15	Boston Celtics	94–80	State Fair Coliseum	Dolph Schayes (24)	25–25
51	February 17	@ New York Knicks	75–88	Madison Square Garden	Dolph Schayes (26)	25–26
52	February 18	Minneapolis Lakers	91–80	State Fair Coliseum	Billy Gabor (26)	26–26
53	February 20	@ Indianapolis Olympians	81–79	Butler Fieldhouse	Dolph Schayes (18)	27–26
54	February 21	@ Minneapolis Lakers	76–82	Minneapolis Auditorium	Johnny Macknowski (17)	27–27
55	February 25	New York Knicks	98–93	State Fair Coliseum	Fred Scolari (18)	28–27
56	February 27	@ Philadelphia Warriors	72–86	Philadelphia Arena	Dolph Schayes (18)	28–28

March: 4–6 (Home: 4–1; Road: 0–5)

Game	Date	Opponent	Score	Location	High points	Record
57	March 1	Fort Wayne Pistons	108–86	State Fair Coliseum	Gabor, Schayes (19)	29–28
58	March 3	@ New York Knicks	78–97	Madison Square Garden	Johnny Macknowski (15)	29–29
59	March 4	Philadelphia Warriors	85–79	State Fair Coliseum	Dolph Schayes (23)	30–29
60	March 8	Indianapolis Olympians	121–97	State Fair Coliseum	Noble Jorgensen (27)	31–29
61	March 10	@ Rochester Royals	86–107	Edgerton Park Arena	Dolph Schayes (17)	31–30
62	March 11	Philadelphia Warriors	91–95	State Fair Coliseum	Dolph Schayes (26)	31–31
63	March 13	@ Indianapolis Olympians	93–98	Butler Fieldhouse	Alex Hannum (23)	31–32
64	March 14	@ Minneapolis Lakers	76–100	Minneapolis Auditorium	Dolph Schayes (24)	31–33
65	March 17	@ Philadelphia Warriors	86–100	Philadelphia Arena	George Ratkovicz (20)	31–34
66	March 18	Boston Celtics	97–89	State Fair Coliseum	George Ratkovicz (20)	32–34

1950–51 Schedule

== Playoffs ==
1951 playoff game log
Division Semifinals: 2–0 (home: 1–0; road: 1–0)

Game	Date	Team	Score	High points	High rebounds	High assists	Location	Record
1	March 20	@ Philadelphia	W 91–89 (OT)	Fred Scolari (23)	Dolph Schayes (13)	Seymour, Cervi (7)	Philadelphia Arena	1–0
2	March 22	Philadelphia	W 90–78	Dolph Schayes (24)	Dolph Schayes (16)	Seymour, Hannum (5)	State Fair Coliseum	2–0

Division Finals: 2–3 (home: 2–0; road: 0–3)

Game	Date	Team	Score	High points	High assists	Location Attendance	Record
1	March 28	@ New York	L 92–103	George Ratkovicz (22)	Alex Hannum (7)	Madison Square Garden III	0–1
2	March 29	New York	W 102–80	Dolph Schayes (21)	Al Cervi (9)	State Fair Coliseum	1–1
3	March 31	@ New York	L 75–77 (OT)	Dolph Schayes (17)	—	Madison Square Garden III	1–2
4	April 1	New York	W 90–83	Dolph Schayes (34)	Al Cervi (8)	State Fair Coliseum	2–2
5	April 4	@ New York	L 81–83	Dolph Schayes (14)	four players tied (3)	Madison Square Garden III	2–3

1951 schedule

== Awards and records ==
- Dolph Schayes, All-NBA Second Team
