= 1951 NBA playoffs =

Postseason tournament

Tournament details
- Dates: March 20 – April 21, 1951
- Season: 1950–51
- Teams: 8

Final positions
- Champions: Rochester Royals (1st title)
- Runners-up: New York Knicks
- Semifinalists: Minneapolis Lakers; Syracuse Nationals

The 1951 NBA playoffs was the postseason tournament of the National Basketball Association 1950–51 season. The tournament concluded with the Western Division champion Rochester Royals defeating the Eastern Division champion New York Knicks 4 games to 3 in the NBA Finals.

The eight qualified teams began tournament play on Tuesday and Wednesday, March 20 and 21, and the Finals concluded on Saturday, April 21. Rochester and New York played 14 games in a span of 33 days; their seven final games in fifteen days.

The Rochester Royals (now the Sacramento Kings) were "royalty" in their first nine seasons, from 1945–46 to 1953–54 always one of the strong teams in their league. Rochester had played three seasons in the National Basketball League, winning the 1946 NBL championship and losing the Finals in 1947 and 1948. In one BAA and one NBA season, the team had won 75% of its games before losing in the second round, then first round, of the 1949 and 1950 playoffs. The 1950–51 team won more than 60% of its games, as the Royals would do for three more seasons, and participated in the club's only NBA Finals. That remains true more than 60 years later, covering stints in Rochester, Cincinnati, Kansas City, and Sacramento.

The New York Knicks were an original Basketball Association of America franchise, now in its sixth season and participating in the BAA or NBA Finals for the first time. It would be the first of three consecutive years as the losing finalist.

Another six-year-old, original BAA team, the Boston Celtics had qualified only for the 1948 BAA Playoffs. Now the second-place Eastern Division team, Boston had earned home-court advantage for a first-round series with third-place New York. It was the first playoff meeting in the Celtics–Knicks rivalry and it would be the first of 19 consecutive years in the playoffs.

== Bracket ==
Division Semifinals
E1	Philadelphia*	0
E4	Syracuse	2
Eastern Division
E3	New York	2
E2	Boston	0
W1	Minneapolis*	2
W4	Indianapolis	1
Western Division
W3	Fort Wayne	1
W2	Rochester	2

Division Finals
E4	Syracuse	2
E3	New York	3
W1	Minneapolis*	1
W2	Rochester	3

NBA Finals
E3	New York	3
W2	Rochester	4

- * Division winner
- Bold Series winner
- Italic Team with home-court advantage in NBA Finals

== Division Semifinals ==
=== Eastern Division Semifinals ===
==== (1) Philadelphia Warriors vs. (4) Syracuse Nationals ====
March 20

Boxscore

Syracuse Nationals 91, Philadelphia Warriors 89 (OT)
Scoring by quarter: 19–27, 29–23, 19–18, 22–21, Overtime: 2–0
Pts: Fred Scolari 23; Rebs: Dolph Schayes 13; Asts: Seymour, Cervi 7 each	Pts: Joe Fulks 30; Rebs: Ed Mikan 16; Asts: George Senesky 10
Syracuse leads series, 1–0

Philadelphia Arena, Philadelphia, Pennsylvania

March 22

Boxscore

Philadelphia Warriors 78, Syracuse Nationals 90
Scoring by quarter: 18–24, 11–20, 23–22, 26–24
Pts: Joe Fulks 22; Rebs: Arizin, Phillip 8 each Asts: Andy Phillip 9	Pts: Dolph Schayes 24; Rebs: Dolph Schayes 16; Asts: Seymour, Hannum 5 each
Syracuse wins series, 2–0

State Fair Coliseum, Geddes, New York

This was the second playoff meeting between these two teams, with the 76ers/Nationals winning the first meeting.

Previous playoff series
Philadelphia 76ers/ Syracuse Nationals leads 1–0 in all-time playoff series

1950

Philadelphia Warriors 0, Syracuse Nationals 2

1950 Eastern Division Semifinals

==== (2) Boston Celtics vs. (3) New York Knicks ====
March 20

Boxscore

New York Knicks 83, Boston Celtics 69
Scoring by quarter: 28–14, 9–17, 19–15, 27–23
Pts: Vince Boryla 20	Pts: Ed Macauley 23
New York leads series, 1–0

Boston Garden, Boston, Massachusetts

March 22

Boxscore

Boston Celtics 78, New York Knicks 92
Scoring by quarter: 12–20, 15–19, 24–26, 27–27
Pts: Ed Macauley 21; Asts: Bob Cousy 6	Pts: Max Zaslofsky 27; Asts: Dick McGuire 9
New York wins series, 2–0

Madison Square Garden III, Manhattan, New York
Referees: Pat Kennedy, Arnie Heft

This was the first playoff meeting between these two teams.

=== Western Division Semifinals ===
==== (1) Minneapolis Lakers vs. (4) Indianapolis Olympians ====
March 21

Boxscore

Indianapolis Olympians 81, Minneapolis Lakers 95
Scoring by quarter: 14–29, 19–20, 28–19, 20–27
Pts: Groza, Beard 19 each	Pts: George Mikan 41
Minneapolis leads series, 1–0

Minneapolis Auditorium, Minneapolis, Minnesota

March 23

Boxscore

Minneapolis Lakers 88, Indianapolis Olympians 108
Scoring by quarter: 7–28, 29–27, 29–30, 23–23
Pts: Vern Mikkelsen 30	Pts: Alex Groza 40
Series tied, 1–1

Butler Fieldhouse, Indianapolis, Indiana

March 25

Boxscore

Indianapolis Olympians 80, Minneapolis Lakers 85
Scoring by quarter: 22–15, 19–18, 18–29, 21–23
Pts: Alex Groza 38	Pts: George Mikan 30
Minneapolis wins series, 2–1

Minneapolis Auditorium, Minneapolis, Minnesota

This was the first playoff meeting between these two teams.

==== (2) Rochester Royals vs. (3) Fort Wayne Pistons ====
March 20

Boxscore

Fort Wayne Pistons 81, Rochester Royals 110
Scoring by quarter: 14–30, 29–27, 20–25, 18–28
Pts: Dick Mehen 19	Pts: Bob Davies 21
Rochester leads series, 1–0

Edgerton Park Arena, Rochester, New York

March 22

Boxscore

Rochester Royals 78, Fort Wayne Pistons 83
Scoring by quarter: 13–20, 23–24, 18–18, 24–21
Pts: Risen, Davies 16 each	Pts: Fred Schaus 21
Series tied, 1–1

North Side High School Gym, Fort Wayne, Indiana

March 24

Boxscore

Fort Wayne Pistons 78, Rochester Royals 97
Scoring by quarter: 22–23, 19–23, 11–27, 26–24
Pts: Fred Schaus 12	Pts: Bobby Wanzer 20
Rochester wins series, 2–1

Edgerton Park Arena, Rochester, New York

This was the second playoff meeting between these two teams, with the Pistons winning the first meeting.

Previous playoff series
Fort Wayne leads 1–0 in all-time playoff series

1950

Fort Wayne Pistons 2, Rochester Royals 0

1950 Central Division Semifinals

== Division Finals ==
=== Eastern Division Finals ===
==== (3) New York Knicks vs. (4) Syracuse Nationals ====
March 28

Boxscore

Syracuse Nationals 92, New York Knicks 103
Scoring by quarter: 22–23, 17–25, 19–24, 34–31
Pts: George Ratkovicz 22; Asts: Alex Hannum 7	Pts: Vince Boryla 30; Asts: Dick McGuire 13
New York leads series, 1–0

Madison Square Garden III, Manhattan, New York
Referees: Julie Meyer, Charles Eckman

March 29

Boxscore

New York Knicks 80, Syracuse Nationals 102
Scoring by quarter: 19–22, 17–21, 17–27, 27–32
Pts: Ray Lumpp 16; Asts: Vandeweghe, McGuire 5 each	Pts: Dolph Schayes 21; Asts: Al Cervi 9
Series tied, 1–1

State Fair Coliseum, Geddes, New York
Referees: Julie Meyer, Charles Eckman

March 31

Boxscore

Syracuse Nationals 75, New York Knicks 77 (OT)
Scoring by quarter: 20–16, 16–12, 15–22, 19–20, Overtime: 5–7
Pts: Dolph Schayes 17	Pts: Harry Gallatin 18
New York leads series, 2–1

Madison Square Garden III, Manhattan, New York
Referees: Julie Meyer, Jocko Collins

April 1

Boxscore

New York Knicks 83, Syracuse Nationals 90
Scoring by quarter: 12–25, 22–21, 26–19, 23–25
Pts: Max Zaslofsky 20; Asts: Dick McGuire 9	Pts: Dolph Schayes 34; Asts: Al Cervi 8
Series tied, 2–2

State Fair Coliseum, Geddes, New York

April 4

Boxscore

Syracuse Nationals 81, New York Knicks 83
Scoring by quarter: 20–25, 22–17, 22–15, 17–26
Pts: Dolph Schayes 14; Asts: four players 3 each	Pts: Vince Boryla 23; Asts: Ernie Vandeweghe 5
New York wins series, 3–2

Madison Square Garden III, Manhattan, New York
Referees: Julie Meyer, Sid Borgia

This was the second playoff meeting between these two teams, with the Nationals winning the first meeting.

Previous playoff series
Syracuse leads 1–0 in all-time playoff series

1950

New York Knicks 1, Syracuse Nationals 2

1950 Eastern Division Finals

=== Western Division Finals ===
==== (1) Minneapolis Lakers vs. (2) Rochester Royals ====
March 29

Boxscore

Rochester Royals 73, Minneapolis Lakers 76
Scoring by quarter: 20–20, 18–18, 10–16, 25–22
Pts: Arnie Risen 24	Pts: Vern Mikkelsen 23
Minneapolis leads series, 1–0

Minneapolis Auditorium, Minneapolis, Minnesota

March 31

Boxscore

Rochester Royals 70, Minneapolis Lakers 66
Scoring by quarter: 17–16, 20–14, 16–19, 17–17
Pts: Red Holzman 23	Pts: Jim Pollard 20
Series tied, 1–1

Minneapolis Auditorium, Minneapolis, Minnesota

April 1

Boxscore

Minneapolis Lakers 70, Rochester Royals 83
Scoring by quarter: 22–31, 17–17, 20–20, 11–15
Pts: George Mikan 23	Pts: Johnson, Wanzer 20 each
Rochester leads series, 2–1

Edgerton Park Arena, Rochester, New York

April 3

Boxscore

Minneapolis Lakers 75, Rochester Royals 80
Scoring by quarter: 26–25, 14–16, 16–18, 19–21
Pts: George Mikan 32	Pts: Arnie Risen 26
Rochester wins series, 3–1

Edgerton Park Arena, Rochester, New York

This was the second playoff meeting between these two teams, with the Lakers winning the first meeting.

As of 2026, this is the last time the Royals/Kings won a conference championship.

Previous playoff series
Minneapolis leads 1–0 in all-time playoff series

1949

Minneapolis Lakers 2, Rochester Royals 0

1949 Western Division Finals

== NBA Finals: (W2) Rochester Royals vs. (E3) New York Knicks ==
April 7

Boxscore

New York Knicks 65, Rochester Royals 92
Scoring by quarter: 18–24, 16–27, 16–21, 15–20
Pts: Vince Boryla 13; Rebs: Simmons, Clifton 10 each Asts: Ernie Vandeweghe 4	Pts: Arnie Risen 24; Rebs: Arnie Risen 15; Asts: Bobby Wanzer 9
Rochester leads series, 1–0

Edgerton Park Arena, Rochester, New York
Attendance: 4,200

April 8

Boxscore

New York Knicks 84, Rochester Royals 99
Scoring by quarter: 17–26, 21–21, 28–26, 18–26
Pts: Max Zaslofsky 28; Rebs: Harry Gallatin 17; Asts: Vince Boryla 7	Pts: Bob Davies 24; Rebs: Jack Coleman 28; Asts: Jack Coleman 8
Rochester leads series, 2–0

Edgerton Park Arena, Rochester, New York
Attendance: 4,200

April 11

Boxscore

Rochester Royals 78, New York Knicks 71
Scoring by quarter: 15–17, 20–16, 16–15, 27–23
Pts: Arnie Risen 27; Rebs: Arnie Risen 18; Asts: Bob Davies 8	Pts: Vince Boryla 20; Rebs: Nat Clifton 11; Asts: Dick McGuire 7
Rochester leads series, 3–0

69th Regiment Armory, Manhattan, New York
Attendance: 5,000

April 13

Boxscore

Rochester Royals 73, New York Knicks 79
Scoring by quarter: 10–21, 18–19, 28–17, 17–22
Pts: Arnie Risen 26; Rebs: Arnie Risen 20; Asts: Jack Coleman 9	Pts: Harry Gallatin 22; Rebs: Nat Clifton 17; Asts: Zaslofsky, Clifton 6 each
Rochester leads series, 3–1

69th Regiment Armory, Manhattan, New York
Attendance: 4,000

April 15

Boxscore

New York Knicks 92, Rochester Royals 89
Scoring by quarter: 25–28, 19–21, 29–21, 19–19
Pts: Connie Simmons 26; Rebs: Nat Clifton 10; Asts: Nat Clifton 7	Pts: Bobby Wanzer 21; Rebs: Arnie Risen 14; Asts: Bob Davies 10
Rochester leads series, 3–2

Edgerton Park Arena, Rochester, New York
Attendance: 4,200

April 18

Boxscore

Rochester Royals 73, New York Knicks 80
Scoring by quarter: 21–19, 17–19, 12–15, 23–27
Pts: Arnie Johnson 27; Rebs: Arnie Johnson 15; Asts: Jack Coleman 8	Pts: Max Zaslofsky 23; Rebs: Ernie Vandeweghe 8 Asts: Dick McGuire 6
Series tied, 3–3

69th Regiment Armory, Manhattan, New York
Attendance: 4,500

April 21

Boxscore

New York Knicks 75, Rochester Royals 79
Scoring by quarter: 16–22, 18–18, 26–22, 15–17
Pts: Zaslofsky, Boryla 16 each Rebs: Harry Gallatin 10; Asts: Ernie Vandeweghe 5	Pts: Arnie Risen 24; Rebs: Arnie Risen 13; Asts: Jack Coleman 9
Rochester wins series, 4–3

Edgerton Park Arena, Rochester, New York
Attendance: 4,200

- This was the first time in NBA playoff history a team has forced a seventh game after falling behind 3–0 in the series, and the only time to date in the NBA Finals.

This was the first playoff meeting between these two teams.
