= 1949–50 Minneapolis Lakers season =

Pro basketball team season (won NBA championship)

- NBA champions
- Division champions
- Head coach: John Kundla
- Arena: Minneapolis Auditorium

Results
- Record: 51–17 (.750)
- Place: Division: 1st (Central)
- Playoff finish: NBA champions (Defeated Nationals 4–2)
- Stats at Basketball Reference
- Radio: WLOL

The 1949–50 Minneapolis Lakers season was the second season for the franchise in the National Basketball Association (NBA). The Lakers repeated as NBA Champions, defeating the Syracuse Nationals in six games in the NBA Finals, making it (to date) the only franchise to win the championship in each of its first two NBA seasons. In fact, technically speaking, the Lakers would be the only team to hold three straight professional basketball championships (technically four) in three straight seasons of play, as Minneapolis would first win the 1947–48 season's championship (alongside the last ever WPBT) while competing in the National Basketball League (NBL) in their first season competing as the Minneapolis Lakers before defecting out into the Basketball Association of America (BAA) for the following season afterward to win the last ever BAA Finals championship ever held before the NBL-BAA merger into the NBA happened, with the Lakers winning what can technically be considered the first ever NBA Finals match-up ever held under that new league's name following that merger of the BAA and NBL's operations from this season (though the NBA would officially hold the BAA's history instead of the NBL's history outside of scant few exceptions in terms of recognition, such as the Lakers' 1948 NBL championship).

== BAA/NBA draft ==
Round	Pick	Player	Position	Nationality	School/Club team
T	–	Vern Mikkelsen	F/C	United States	Hamline
–	–	Bob Harrison	G	United States	Michigan
–	–	Paul Walther	F/G	United States	Tennessee

== Roster ==
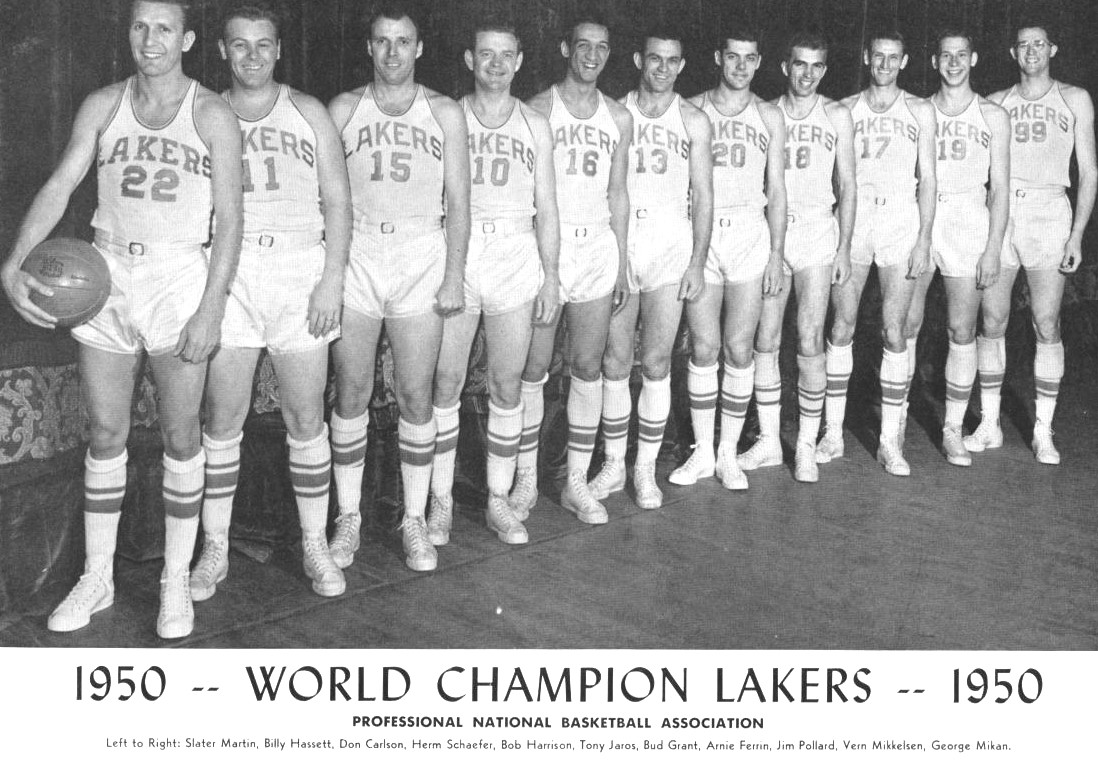
The team.

1949–50 Minneapolis Lakers roster
Players

Pos.	No.	Player	Height	Weight	DOB	From
G/F	15	Don Carlson	6 ft 0 in (1.83 m)	170 lb (77 kg)	1921-03-22	Minnesota
G/F	18	Arnie Ferrin	6 ft 2 in (1.88 m)	180 lb (82 kg)	1925-07-29	Utah
F	20	Normie Glick	6 ft 7 in (2.01 m)	190 lb (86 kg)	1927-11-10	Loyola Marymount
F	14−20	Bud Grant	6 ft 3 in (1.91 m)	195 lb (88 kg)	1927-05-20	Minnesota
G	16	Bob Harrison	6 ft 1 in (1.85 m)	190 lb (86 kg)	1927-08-12	Michigan
G	11	Billy Hassett	5 ft 11 in (1.80 m)	180 lb (82 kg)	1921-10-21	Notre Dame
G/F	13	Tony Jaros	6 ft 3 in (1.91 m)	185 lb (84 kg)	1920-02-22	Minnesota
G	22	Slater Martin	5 ft 10 in (1.78 m)	170 lb (77 kg)	1925-10-22	Texas
C	99	George Mikan	6 ft 10 in (2.08 m)	245 lb (111 kg)	1924-06-18	DePaul
F/C	19	Vern Mikkelsen	6 ft 7 in (2.01 m)	230 lb (104 kg)	1928-10-21	Hamline
F/C	17	Jim Pollard	6 ft 4 in (1.93 m)	185 lb (84 kg)	1922-07-09	Stanford
G/F	10	Herm Schaefer	6 ft 0 in (1.83 m)	175 lb (79 kg)	1918-11-20	Indiana
G/F	12	Gene Stump	6 ft 2 in (1.88 m)	185 lb (84 kg)	1923-11-13	DePaul
G/F	14	Paul Walther	6 ft 2 in (1.88 m)	160 lb (73 kg)	1927-03-23	Tennessee

Coaches
Head coach

John Kundla

Legend
- (DP) Unsigned draft pick
- (FA) Free agent
- (S) Suspended
- Injured

Roster

== Regular season ==
=== Season standings ===
Central Division	W	L	PCT	GB	Home	Road	Neutral	Div
x-Minneapolis Lakers	51	17	.750	–	30–1	18–16	3–0	16–8
x-Rochester Royals	51	17	.750	–	33–1	17–16	1–0	15–9
x-Fort Wayne Pistons	40	28	.588	11	28–6	12–22	–	14–10
x-Chicago Stags	40	28	.588	11	18–6	14–21	8–1	11–13
St. Louis Bombers	26	42	.382	25	17–14	7–26	2–2	4–20

=== Game log ===
#	Date	Opponent	Score	High points	Record
1	November 2	at Philadelphia	81–69	Jim Pollard (30)	1–0
2	November 5	at Baltimore	92–77	George Mikan (28)	2–0
3	November 8	at Washington	68–66	Jim Pollard (21)	3–0
4	November 10	at Boston	98–84	George Mikan (37)	4–0
5	November 12	at Chicago	79–86	George Mikan (30)	4–1
6	November 16	St. Louis	94–71	Herm Schaefer (20)	5–1
7	November 17	at St. Louis	65–78	George Mikan (17)	5–2
8	November 19	at Anderson	80–83	George Mikan (34)	5–3
9	November 20	Indianapolis	121–95	George Mikan (29)	6–3
10	November 23	Baltimore	84–71	George Mikan (28)	7–3
11	November 25	at Denver	101–81	George Mikan (29)	8–3
12	November 27	Chicago	82–96	George Mikan (34)	8–4
13	November 30	New York	102–92	George Mikan (28)	9–4
14	December 1	at Indianapolis	68–86	George Mikan (33)	9–5
15	December 3	at Chicago	91–80	George Mikan (34)	10–5
16	December 4	Rochester	95–80	George Mikan (27)	11–5
17	December 7	Washington	93–76	George Mikan (35)	12–5
18	December 8	at Fort Wayne	66–87	George Mikan (27)	12–6
19	December 10	vs Denver	89–76	George Mikan (31)	13–6
20	December 11	Philadelphia	90–81	George Mikan (28)	14–6
21	December 14	at New York	84–94	George Mikan (38)	14–7
22	December 15	at Baltimore	68–87	George Mikan (34)	14–8
23	December 18	Boston	77–72	George Mikan (24)	15–8
24	December 20	at Rochester	62–87	George Mikan (26)	15–9
25	December 21	at Washington	75–61	George Mikan (21)	16–9
26	December 22	at Boston	69–87	George Mikan (21)	16–10
27	December 25	Fort Wayne	72–58	George Mikan (22)	17–10
28	December 26	at Tri-Cities	78–76	George Mikan (22)	18–10
29	December 28	Baltimore	88–77	Mikan, Pollard (24)	19–10
30	December 31	at Waterloo	86–68	George Mikan (35)	20–10
31	January 1	Anderson	87–75	George Mikan (38)	21–10
32	January 4	Fort Wayne	91–75	George Mikan (22)	22–10
33	January 5	at Sheboygan	82–85	George Mikan (42)	22–11
34	January 8	Boston	85–80 (OT)	George Mikan (30)	23–11
35	January 11	Syracuse	98–88	George Mikan (27)	24–11
36	January 12	at St. Louis	89–73	Vern Mikkelsen (31)	25–11
37	January 14	at Rochester	77–83	George Mikan (51)	25–12
38	January 15	Rochester	85–73	George Mikan (25)	26–12
39	January 17	at Boston	105–79	George Mikan (22)	27–12
40	January 18	at Washington	76–68	George Mikan (23)	28–12
41	January 19	at New York	94–83	George Mikan (31)	29–12
42	January 20	at Philadelphia	89–90	George Mikan (34)	29–13
43	January 22	Chicago	103–75	George Mikan (28)	30–13
44	January 24	at Chicago	80–68	George Mikan (40)	31–13
45	January 25	St. Louis	85–78	George Mikan (23)	32–13
46	January 29	Washington	88–60	George Mikan (31)	33–13
47	February 1	New York	96–81	George Mikan (35)	34–13
48	February 2	at Fort Wayne	79–78	Vern Mikkelsen (21)	35–13
49	February 5	Philadelphia	100–67	George Mikan (23)	36–13
50	February 9	Washington	71–59	Mikan, Mikkelsen (15)	37–13
51	February 12	Boston	88–70	Jim Pollard (29)	38–13
52	February 15	Rochester	92–70	George Mikan (34)	39–13
53	February 16	at St. Louis	72–71	Jim Pollard (25)	40–13
54	February 17	Waterloo	80–74	Vern Mikkelsen (20)	41–13
55	February 19	Chicago	96–83	George Mikan (33)	42–13
56	February 22	St. Louis	100–57	George Mikan (28)	43–13
57	February 25	at Rochester	64–66	George Mikan (39)	43–14
58	February 26	Tri-Cities	80–66	George Mikan (30)	44–14
59	February 28	Fort Wayne	71–65	Mikan, Mikkelsen (19)	45–14
60	March 2	at Baltimore	88–68	George Mikan (24)	46–14
61	March 3	at Philadelphia	61–66	George Mikan (21)	46–15
62	March 4	at New York	84–75	Mikan, Pollard (23)	47–15
63	March 5	at Syracuse	75–84	George Mikan (29)	47–16
64	March 7	Sheboygan	90–73	Vern Mikkelsen (19)	48–16
65	March 8	Philadelphia	68–65	George Mikan (34)	49–16
66	March 12	New York	87–66	George Mikan (32)	50–16
67	March 15	Baltimore	96–62	George Mikan (34)	51–16
68	March 19	at Fort Wayne	67–69	George Mikan (30)	51–17

== Playoffs ==
1950 playoff game log
Division Tiebreaker (finishes as Central's #1 seed)

Game	Date	Team	Score	High points	High assists	Location	Record
1	March 21	@ Rochester	W 78–76	George Mikan (35)	Herm Schaefer (7)	Edgerton Park Arena	1–0

Division Semifinals: 2–0 (home: 1–0; road: 1–0)

Game	Date	Team	Score	High points	High assists	Location	Series
1	March 22	Chicago	W 85–75	George Mikan (30)	George Mikan (3)	Minneapolis Auditorium	1–0
2	March 25	@ Chicago	W 75–67	George Mikan (34)	—	Chicago Stadium	2–0

Division Finals: 2–0 (home: 1–0; road: 1–0)

Game	Date	Team	Score	High points	High assists	Location	Series
1	March 27	Fort Wayne	W 93–79	George Mikan (24)	George Mikan (4)	Minneapolis Auditorium	1–0
2	March 28	@ Fort Wayne	W 89–82	George Mikan (37)	—	North Side High School Gym	2–0

NBA Semifinals: 2–0 (home: 1–0; road: 1–0)

Game	Date	Team	Score	High points	High assists	Location Attendance	Series
1	April 5	Anderson	W 75–50	George Mikan (26)	Jim Pollard (5)	Minneapolis Auditorium	1–0
2	April 6	@ Anderson	W 90–71	George Mikan (32)	—	Anderson High School Wigwam	2–0

NBA Finals: 4–2 (home: 3–0; road: 1–2)

Game	Date	Team	Score	High points	High assists	Location Attendance	Series
1	April 8	@ Syracuse	W 68–66	George Mikan (37)	—	State Fair Coliseum; 7,552	1–0
2	April 9	@ Syracuse	L 85–91	George Mikan (32)	—	State Fair Coliseum; 8,280	1–1
3	April 14	Syracuse	W 91–77	George Mikan (28)	George Mikan (8)	St. Paul Auditorium; 10,288	2–1
4	April 16	Syracuse	W 77–69	George Mikan (28)	Jim Pollard (4)	St. Paul Auditorium; 10,512	3–1
5	April 20	@ Syracuse	L 76–83	George Mikan (28)	—	State Fair Coliseum; 9,024	3–2
6	April 23	Syracuse	W 110–95	George Mikan (40)	Jim Pollard (10)	Minneapolis Auditorium; 9,812	4–2

1950 schedule

This season held their second and final playoff series match-up against the Chicago Stags (who folded operations on September 25, 1950 before the start of the upcoming NBA season) alongside their first and only playoff series match-up (either in the NBL or NBA) against the Anderson Packers (with Anderson later leaving the NBA after the 1950 NBA playoffs concluded).

== Awards and honors ==
- George Mikan, All-NBA First Team
- Jim Pollard, All-NBA First Team
