= Al Cervi =

American basketball player and coach (1917–2009)

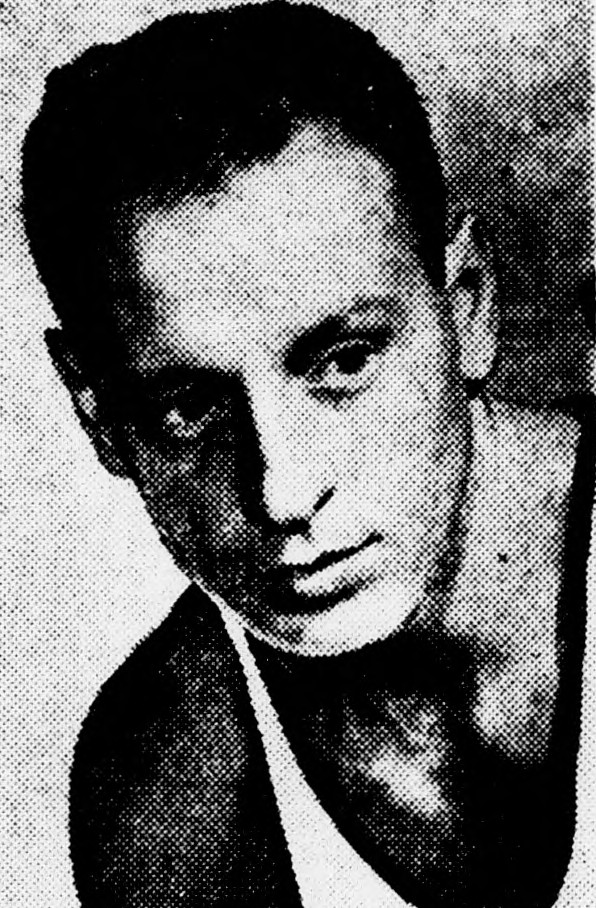
- Cervi circa 1949

Personal information
- Born: February 12, 1917 Buffalo, New York, U.S.
- Died: November 9, 2009 (aged 92) Rochester, New York, U.S.
- Listed height: 5 ft 11 in (1.80 m)
- Listed weight: 170 lb (77 kg)

Career information
- High school: East (Buffalo, New York)
- Playing career: 1937–1953
- Position: Small forward / shooting guard
- Number: 15
- Coaching career: 1948–1959, 1966–1967

Career history

Playing
- 1937–1938: Buffalo Bisons
- 1945–1948: Rochester Royals
- 1948–1953: Syracuse Nationals

Career highlights
- As player: All-NBA Second Team (1950); NBL champion (1946); 3× All-NBL First Team (1947–1949); All-NBL Second Team (1946); NBL scoring champion (1947); As coach: NBA champion (1955); 2× NBA All-Star Game head coach (1952, 1955); NBL Coach of the Year (1949)

Career NBA playing statistics
- Points: 1,591 (7.9 ppg)
- Rebounds: 261 (1.8 rpg)
- Assists: 648 (3.2 apg)
- Stats at NBA.com
- Stats at Basketball Reference

Career coaching record
- NBA: 326–241 (.575)
- Record at Basketball Reference
- Basketball Hall of Fame

Alfred Nicholas Cervi (February 12, 1917 – November 9, 2009) was an American professional basketball player and coach in the National Basketball League (NBL) and National Basketball Association (NBA). One of the strongest backcourt players of the 1940s and 1950s, he was always assigned to defend against the opposing team's best scoring threat. He earned the nickname "Digger" because of his hard-nosed style of defense. He won the National Basketball League championship in 1946 with the Rochester Royals while being an All-NBL First Team in three straight seasons. He stayed with the NBL with the Syracuse Nationals in 1948, where he became player-coach that same year, which was the last one prior to joining the NBA. In that first year in the NBA, the Nationals won 51 games and reached the Finals, where they lost to the Minneapolis Lakers in six games. Cervi led the team back to the Finals in 1954 and 1955, which each saw the Nationals play in a Game 7; denied in 1954 to Minneapolis, the Nationals won Game 7 in 1955 for their first NBA championship. After twelve games in 1956, Cervi was fired from the Nationals, having coached them to eight postseason appearances in nine seasons. He coached one season with the Philadelphia Warriors in 1958 but elected to leave coaching for more lucrative ventures. Cervi was inducted into the Naismith Memorial Basketball Hall of Fame in 1985.

== Early life ==
Born in Buffalo, New York, Cervi attended East High School in his hometown, where he captained the baseball and basketball teams and earned All-City honors in both sports. He dropped out of school after his junior year when he was recruited by the Buffalo Bisons of the newly formed NBL. He played in all of the Bisons' nine games in 1937–38, the franchise's only season of existence.

He never attended college. Instead, he served five years in the United States Army Air Forces from 1940 through 1945.

== Rochester Royals (1945–1948) ==
After the conclusion of World War II, he joined the Rochester Royals, another NBL franchise entering its first year of operations. He immediately experienced success as the team captured the 1945–46 league title after sweeping the best-of-five championship series from the Sheboygan Red Skins. The Royals returned to the finals the following two seasons, but lost to the Chicago American Gears and Minneapolis Lakers in four games each. Cervi made the All-NBL First Team in 1947 and 1948. In the first of those two campaigns, he was the leading scorer with 632 points.

His time with the Royals lasted only three seasons. After discovering that other teammates were being paid more than his $7,500 annual salary, he requested a $3,500 raise, which was denied by team owner Les Harrison. As a result, instead of moving with the Royals to the Basketball Association of America (BAA) after the 1948 campaign, Cervi stayed in the NBL and joined the Syracuse Nationals, who met his salary demands and appointed him player-coach.

== Syracuse Nationals (1948–1957) ==
Besides being named to the All-NBL First Team for a third straight year in 1949, he also earned Coach of the Year honors. After the BAA-NBL merger to form the NBA prior to the 1949–50 campaign, he continued to serve in the dual capacity role until his retirement as an active player in 1953. However, his last year as a full-time player was 1952; it was the last year that he played at least 50 games.

The Syracuse teams he piloted took on his relentlessly competitive nature. He played a major role in the development of Dolph Schayes.

The Nationals qualified for the playoffs in eight of the nine seasons that he coached the ballclub, including three trips to the NBA Finals. They were twice defeated by the Lakers, first in six games in 1950 and then in seven in 1954. The pinnacle of Cervi's coaching career was leading his squad to the NBA Championship over the Fort Wayne Pistons in seven games in 1955.

When the Nationals began the 1956–57 campaign at 4–8, he was replaced by team captain Paul Seymour.

== Later years ==
Cervi succeeded George Senesky as coach of the Philadelphia Warriors in 1958, but left after one season to accept a more lucrative job in the trucking business as an area manager for Eastern Freightways, Inc. in Rochester, New York. In 1960 he declined to accept a two-year offer to coach the Lakers in its first campaign in Los Angeles because his wife was reluctant to leave the Rochester area. Cervi was the head coach for the New Haven Elms of the Eastern Professional Basketball League (EPBL) during the 1966–67 season. He lived in the suburb of Brighton for the last 58 years of his life.

Cervi was inducted into the Naismith Memorial Basketball Hall of Fame in 1985. He received similar honors from the Greater Buffalo Sports Hall of Fame in 2003.

He died on November 9, 2009, in Rochester, New York, at the age of 92.

Cervi was featured in the book, Basketball History in Syracuse, Hoops Roots by author Mark Allen Baker published by The History Press in 2010. The book is an introduction to professional basketball in Syracuse and includes teams like (Vic Hanson's) All-Americans, the Syracuse Reds and the Syracuse Nationals (1946–1963).

== Career playing statistics ==
Legend
GP	Games played	FGM	Field-goals made
FG%	Field-goal percentage	FTM	Free-throws made
FTA	Free-throws attempted	FT%	Free-throw percentage
RPG	Rebounds per game	APG	Assists per game
PTS	Points	PPG	Points per game
**Bold**	Career high

†	Denotes seasons in which Cervi's team won an NBL championship

=== NBL ===
==== Regular season ====
Year	Team	GP	FGM	FTM	FTA	FT%	PTS	PPG
1937–38	Buffalo	9	19	6			44	4.9
1945–46†	Rochester	28	112	76	108	.704	300	10.7
1946–47	Rochester	44	228	176	236	.746	632	**14.4**
1947–48	Rochester	49	**234**	187	242	**.773**	655	13.4
1948–49	Syracuse	**57**	204	**287**	**382**	.751	**695**	12.2
Career		187	797	732	968	.750	2,326	12.4

==== Playoffs ====
Year	Team	GP	FGM	FTM	FTA	FT%	PTS	PPG
1946†	Rochester	7	23	24	30	**.800**	70	10.0
1947	Rochester	**11**	**49**	**50**	**68**	.735	**148**	**13.5**
1948	Rochester	6	18	14	19	.737	50	8.3
1949	Syracuse	6	12	22	30	.733	46	7.7
Career		30	102	110	147	.748	314	10.5

=== NBA ===
==== Regular season ====
Year	Team	GP	MPG	FG%	FT%	RPG	APG	PPG
1949–50	Syracuse	**56**	–	.332	.829	–	**4.7**	**10.2**
1950–51	Syracuse	53	–	.382	.819	**2.9**	3.9	8.6
1951–52	Syracuse	55	**15.5**	.354	**.883**	1.6	2.7	7.6
1952–53	Syracuse	38	7.9	**.437**	.810	0.6	0.7	3.8
Career		202	12.4	.359	.839	1.8	3.2	7.9

==== Playoffs ====
Year	Team	GP	MPG	FG%	FT%	RPG	APG	PPG
1950	Syracuse	**11**	–	.338	.826	–	4.7	7.6
1951	Syracuse	7	–	.304	.880	**4.7**	**5.4**	**11.1**
1952	Syracuse	7	12.6	.223	**.957**	1.4	2.1	5.1
1953	Syracuse	2	**14.0**	**.600**	.800	0.0	0.5	9.0
Career		27	12.9	.314	.866	2.7	3.9	8.0

== Head coaching record ==
Legend
Regular season	G	Games coached	W	Games won	L	Games lost	W–L %	Win–loss %
Playoffs	PG	Playoff games	PW	Playoff wins	PL	Playoff losses	PW–L %	Playoff win–loss %

Team	Year	G	W	L	W–L%	Finish	PG	PW	PL	PW–L%	Result
Syracuse	1949–50	64	51	13	.797	1st in Eastern	11	6	5	.545	Lost in NBA Finals
Syracuse	1950–51	66	32	34	.318	4th in Eastern	7	4	3	.571	Lost in Division finals
Syracuse	1951–52	66	40	26	.606	1st in Eastern	7	3	4	.571	Lost in Division finals
Syracuse	1952–53	71	47	24	.662	2nd in Eastern	2	0	2	.000	Lost in Division semifinals
Syracuse	1953–54	72	42	30	.583	2nd in Eastern	13	9	4	.692	Lost in NBA finals
Syracuse	1954–55	72	43	29	.597	1st in Eastern	11	7	4	.636	Won NBA championship
Syracuse	1955–56	72	35	37	.486	3rd in Eastern	8	4	4	.500	Lost in Division finals
Syracuse	1956–57	12	4	8	.333	(replaced)	—	—	—	—	—
Philadelphia	1958–59	72	32	40	.444	4th in Eastern	—	—	—	—	Missed playoffs
Career		567	326	241	.575		59	33	26	.559	
