= 1949–50 Syracuse Nationals season =

Season for the Nationals in the National Basketball Association

- Division champions
- Head coach: Al Cervi
- Arena: State Fair Coliseum

Results
- Record: 51–13 (.797)
- Place: Division: 1st (Eastern)
- Playoff finish: NBA Finals (eliminated 2–4)
- Stats at Basketball Reference

Local media
- Television: WHEN 5
- Radio: WNDR

The 1949–50 Syracuse Nationals season was the first season for the franchise in the National Basketball Association (NBA). The Nationals played its previous three seasons in the National Basketball League, which merged with the Basketball Association of America to form the NBA. Because of their prior association with the NBL, they were the only Eastern Division team this season to play 62 regular season games as opposed to the full 68 games that every other team had there. As such, they were one of three new NBA teams to play 62 games this season, with four other NBA teams that were also previously associated with the NBL at the time (all the rest of whom were playing in the Western Division this season) playing 64 games this season instead.

Al Cervi, nicknamed "Digger" for his superior defensive skills, guided the team with his competitive nature while serving as a player-coach. As the Syracuse Post-Standard describes, "The Nationals shot poorly but succeeded because they played Cervi-style basketball: nasty, with an emphasis on defense."

The Nationals went to the NBA Finals after beating the Philadelphia Warriors and New York Knicks, but lost to the Minneapolis Lakers in six games.

== Draft picks ==
The Syracuse Nationals would participate in the 1949 NBL draft, which occurred months before the National Basketball League and the rivaling Basketball Association of America would merge operations to become the present-day National Basketball Association. However, as of 2026, no records of what the Nationals' draft picks were for the NBL have properly come up, with any information on who those final selections might have been being lost to time in the process.

== Roster ==
1949–50 Syracuse Nationals roster
Players
Coaches

Pos.	#	Name	Ht.	Wt.	From
G/F	15	Al Cervi	5 ft 11 in (1.80 m)	170 lb (77 kg)		East HS (NY)
F	9	Leroy Chollet	6 ft 2 in (1.88 m)	190 lb (86 kg)		Canisius
G	4	Ray Corley	6 ft 0 in (1.83 m)	180 lb (82 kg)		Georgetown
G/F	7	Bill Gabor	5 ft 11 in (1.80 m)	170 lb (77 kg)		Syracuse
F/C	10	Alex Hannum	6 ft 7 in (2.01 m)	210 lb (95 kg)		USC
G/F	14	Andrew Levane	6 ft 2 in (1.88 m)	190 lb (86 kg)		St. John's
G/F	5	Johnny Macknowski	6 ft 0 in (1.83 m)	180 lb (82 kg)		Seton Hall
C	50	Ed Peterson	6 ft 9 in (2.06 m)	220 lb (100 kg)		Cornell
F/C	65	George Ratkovicz	6 ft 6 in (1.98 m)	220 lb (100 kg)		Lindblom HS (IL)
F/C	55	Dolph Schayes	6 ft 7 in (2.01 m)	195 lb (88 kg)		NYU
G/F	25	Paul Seymour	6 ft 1 in (1.85 m)	180 lb (82 kg)		Toledo

Head coach
- Al Cervi

Legend
- (DP) Unsigned draft pick
- (FA) Free agent
- (S) Suspended
- Injured

Roster

== Regular season ==
=== Standings ===
Eastern Division	W	L	PCT	GB	Home	Road	Neutral	Div
x-Syracuse Nationals	51	13	.797	–	31–1	15–12	5–0	9–1
x-New York Knicks	40	28	.588	13	19–10	18–16	3–2	20–6
x-Washington Capitols	32	36	.471	21	21–13	10–20	1–3	13–13
x-Philadelphia Warriors	26	42	.382	25	15–15	8–23	3–4	9–17
Baltimore Bullets	25	43	.368	26	16–15	8–25	1–3	8–18
Boston Celtics	22	46	.324	29	12–14	5–28	5–4	11–15

=== Game log ===
1949–50 Game Log
Total: 51–13 (Home: 31–1; Road: 15–12; Neutral: 5–0)
November: 13–1 (Home: 8–0; Road: 3–1; Neutral: 2–0)

Game	Date	Opponent	Score	Location	High points	Record
1	November 3	Denver Nuggets	78–58	State Fair Coliseum	Al Cervi (17)	1–0
2	November 5	vs Denver Nuggets	84–51	(Auburn, New York)	Billy Gabor (12)	2–0
3	November 6	Philadelphia Warriors	82–72	State Fair Coliseum	Dolph Schayes (17)	3–0
4	November 9	Indianapolis Olympians	103–73	State Fair Coliseum	Dolph Schayes (22)	4–0
5	November 10	@ St. Louis Bombers	67–73	St. Louis Arena	Gabor, Hannum (13)	4–1
6	November 12	@ Anderson Packers	84–69	Anderson High School Wigwam	Al Cervi (23)	5–1
7	November 13	New York Knicks	80–66	State Fair Coliseum	Billy Gabor (20)	6–1
8	November 15	@ New York Knicks	77–74	Madison Square Garden III	Dolph Schayes (13)	7–1
9	November 17	Tri-Cities Blackhawks	79–76	State Fair Coliseum	Dolph Schayes (20)	8–1
10	November 20	Denver Nuggets	102–76	State Fair Coliseum	Billy Gabor (22)	9–1
11	November 21	vs Denver Nuggets	77–67	(Oneida, New York)	Andrew Levane (20)	10–1
12	November 24	Anderson Packers	125–123 (5OT)	State Fair Coliseum	Johnny Macknowski (21)	11–1
13	November 27	Waterloo Hawks	80–62	State Fair Coliseum	Dolph Schayes (27)	12–1
14	November 30	@ Boston Celtics	87–71	Boston Garden	Billy Gabor (16)	13–1

December: 11–3 (Home: 5–0; Road: 5–3; Neutral: 1–0)

Game	Date	Opponent	Score	Location	High points	Record
15	December 4	Indianapolis Olympians	67–61	State Fair Coliseum	Al Cervi (18)	14–1
16	December 7	@ Tri-Cities Blackhawks	77–69	Wharton Field House	Dolph Schayes (31)	15–1
17	December 8	@ Sheboygan Red Skins	86–72	Sheboygan Municipal Auditorium and Armory	Dolph Schayes (18)	16–1
18	December 10	@ Rochester Royals	63–69	Edgerton Park Arena	Peterson, Schayes (15)	16–2
19	December 11	Sheboygan Red Skins	89–72	State Fair Coliseum	Dolph Schayes (23)	17–2
20	December 14	Fort Wayne Pistons	96–83	State Fair Coliseum	Dolph Schayes (29)	18–2
21	December 15	@ Anderson Packers	88–100	Anderson High School Wigwam	Al Cervi (17)	18–3
22	December 18	Chicago Stags	86–73	State Fair Coliseum	Dolph Schayes (23)	19–3
23	December 20	@ Waterloo Hawks	95–70	McElroy Auditorium	Ratkovicz, Schayes (14)	20–3
24	December 21	@ Tri-Cities Blackhawks	96–84	Wharton Field House	Billy Gabor (23)	21–3
25	December 22	@ Sheboygan Red Skins	83–74	Sheboygan Municipal Auditorium and Armory	Alex Hannum (17)	22–3
26	December 25	Anderson Packers	94–88	State Fair Coliseum	Paul Seymour (24)	23–3
27	December 28	@ Washington Capitols	85–87	Uline Arena	Billy Gabor (23)	23–4
28	December 29	vs Philadelphia Warriors	64–62	(Atlantic City, New Jersey)	Dolph Schayes (18)	24–4

January: 9–3 (Home: 7–1; Road: 1–2; Neutral: 1–0)

Game	Date	Opponent	Score	Location	High points	Record
29	January 1	Washington Capitols	79–73	State Fair Coliseum	Billy Gabor (20)	25–4
30	January 5	Tri-Cities Blackhawks	82–73	State Fair Coliseum	Al Cervi (18)	26–4
31	January 8	Waterloo Hawks	84–68	State Fair Coliseum	Billy Gabor (19)	27–4
32	January 10	@ Waterloo Hawks	84–86 (OT)	McElroy Auditorium	Paul Seymour (14)	27–5
33	January 11	@ Minneapolis Lakers	88–98	Minneapolis Auditorium	Al Cervi (19)	27–6
34	January 12	@ Fort Wayne Pistons	64–62	North Side High School Gym	Al Cervi (17)	28–6
35	January 15	Indianapolis Olympians	82–69	State Fair Coliseum	Dolph Schayes (23)	29–6
36	January 19	Denver Nuggets	107–86	State Fair Coliseum	Johnny Macknowski (19)	30–6
37	January 22	Anderson Packers	75–77 (OT)	State Fair Coliseum	George Ratkovicz (15)	30–7
38	January 26	Rochester Royals	76–72	State Fair Coliseum	Billy Gabor (20)	31–7
39	January 29	Sheboygan Red Skins	85–70	State Fair Coliseum	Dolph Schayes (21)	32–7
40	January 30	vs Indianapolis Olympians	91–75	(Louisville, Kentucky)	Dolph Schayes (24)	33–7

February: 11–4 (Home: 7–0; Road: 3–4; Neutral: 1–0)

Game	Date	Opponent	Score	Location	High points	Record
41	February 1	@ Tri-Cities Blackhawks	83–91	Wharton Field House	Dolph Schayes (25)	33–8
42	February 2	@ Indianapolis Olympians	73–67	Butler Fieldhouse	George Ratkovicz (16)	34–8
43	February 3	Waterloo Hawks	103–79	State Fair Coliseum	Billy Gabor (32)	35–8
44	February 5	Baltimore Bullets	96–87	State Fair Coliseum	Johnny Macknowski (22)	36–8
45	February 8	Sheboygan Red Skins	106–81	State Fair Coliseum	Billy Gabor (19)	37–8
46	February 11	@ Baltimore Bullets	77–76	Baltimore Coliseum	Al Cervi (18)	38–8
47	February 12	Waterloo Hawks	102–98	State Fair Coliseum	Andrew Levane (21)	39–8
48	February 16	Tri-Cities Blackhawks	105–74	State Fair Coliseum	Dolph Schayes (17)	40–8
49	February 19	Indianapolis Olympians	82–78	State Fair Coliseum	Dolph Schayes (29)	41–8
50	February 21	@ Denver Nuggets	78–89	Denver Auditorium Arena	Dolph Schayes (31)	41–9
51	February 23	@ Denver Nuggets	108–80	Denver Auditorium Arena	Dolph Schayes (25)	42–9
52	February 24	vs Indianapolis Olympians	72–67	(Chicago)	George Ratkovicz (19)	43–9
53	February 26	Chicago Stags	73–64	State Fair Coliseum	Dolph Schayes (24)	44–9
54	February 27	@ Anderson Packers	73–97	Anderson High School Wigwam	Dolph Schayes (17)	44–10
55	February 28	@ Indianapolis Olympians	72–110	Butler Fieldhouse	Alex Hannum (13)	44–11

March: 7–2 (Home: 4–0; Road: 3–2; Neutral: 0–0)

Game	Date	Opponent	Score	Location	High points	Record
56	March 1	@ Waterloo Hawks	93–72	McElroy Auditorium	Dolph Schayes (24)	45–11
57	March 2	@ Sheboygan Red Skins	85–95	Sheboygan Municipal Auditorium and Armory	Dolph Schayes (26)	45–12
58	March 5	Minneapolis Lakers	84–75	State Fair Coliseum	Dolph Schayes (28)	46–12
59	March 9	St. Louis Bombers	85–74	State Fair Coliseum	Dolph Schayes (19)	47–12
60	March 12	Boston Celtics	96–72	State Fair Coliseum	Dolph Schayes (21)	48–12
61	March 14	@ Indianapolis Olympians	65–68	Butler Fieldhouse	George Ratkovicz (20)	48–13
62	March 16	@ Sheboygan Red Skins	88–75	Sheboygan Municipal Auditorium and Armory	Dolph Schayes (18)	49–13
63	March 18	@ Tri-Cities Blackhawks	89–88 (OT)	Wharton Field House	Johnny Macknowski (25)	50–13
64	March 19	Anderson Packers	72–67	State Fair Coliseum	Dolph Schayes (20)	51–13

1949–50 Schedule

== Playoffs ==
1950 playoff game log
Division Semifinals: 2–0 (home: 1–0; road: 1–0)

Game	Date	Team	Score	High points	High assists	Location	Series
1	March 22	Philadelphia	W 93–76	George Ratkovicz (25)	Dolph Schayes (6)	State Fair Coliseum	1–0
2	March 23	@ Philadelphia	W 59–53	Dolph Schayes (16)	Al Cervi (2)	Philadelphia Arena	2–0

Division Finals: 2–1 (home: 2–0; road: 0–1)

Game	Date	Team	Score	High points	High assists	Location	Series
1	March 26	New York	W 91–83 (OT)	Dolph Schayes (26)	Andrew Levane (4)	State Fair Coliseum	1–0
2	March 30	@ New York	L 76–80	George Ratkovicz (17)	Al Cervi (4)	Madison Square Garden III	1–1
3	April 2	New York	W 91–80	Dolph Schayes (24)	Schayes, Cervi (3)	State Fair Coliseum	2–1

NBA Finals: 2–4 (home: 2–1; road: 0–3)

Game	Date	Team	Score	High points	High assists	Location Attendance	Series
1	April 8	Minneapolis	L 66–68	Dolph Schayes (19)	—	State Fair Coliseum; 7,552	0–1
2	April 9	Minneapolis	W 91–85	George Ratkovicz (17)	—	State Fair Coliseum; 8,280	1–1
3	April 14	@ Minneapolis	L 77–91	Johnny Macknowski (25)	Paul Seymour (5)	St. Paul Auditorium; 10,288	1–2
4	April 16	@ Minneapolis	L 69–77	Schayes, Hannum (18)	Bill Gabor (6)	St. Paul Auditorium; 10,512	1–3
5	April 20	Minneapolis	W 83–76	Dolph Schayes (19)	—	State Fair Coliseum; 9,024	2–3
6	April 23	@ Minneapolis	L 95–110	Dolph Schayes (23)	Johnny Macknowski (5)	Minneapolis Auditorium; 9,812	2–4

1950 schedule

- Nationals had a bye in the NBA Semifinals as the team with the best record amongst teams who advanced past the Division Finals.

== Awards and records ==
- Al Cervi, All-NBA Second Team
- Dolph Schayes, All-NBA Second Team
