= Billy Gabor =

American basketball player (1922–2019)

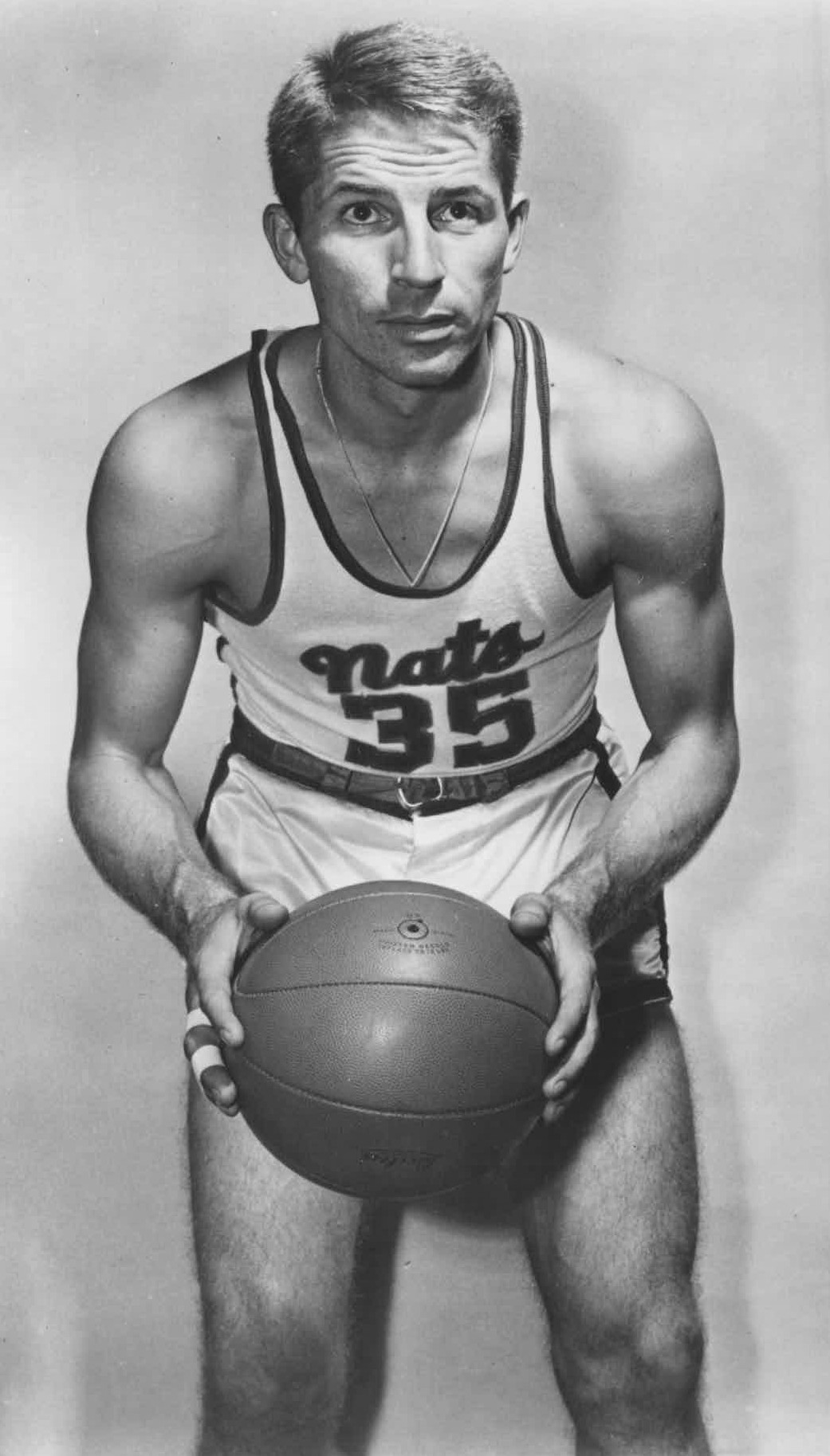
- Billy the Bullet (1950)

Personal information
- Born: May 13, 1922 Binghamton, New York, U.S.
- Died: June 4, 2019 (aged 97) Jupiter, Florida, U.S.
- Listed height: 5 ft 11 in (1.80 m)
- Listed weight: 170 lb (77 kg)

Career information
- High school: Binghamton Central (Binghamton, New York)
- College: Syracuse (1942–1943, 1945–1948)
- NBA draft: 1948: — round, —
- Drafted by: Rochester Royals
- Playing career: 1948–1955
- Position: Point guard
- Number: 35, 7

Career history
- 1948–1955: Syracuse Nationals

Career highlights
- NBA champion (1955); NBA All-Star (1953); 2× Second-team All-American – Helms (1946, 1947); Third-team All-American – TSN (1946); No. 17 retired by Syracuse Orange

Career NBA statistics
- Points: 2,997 (9.8 ppg)
- Rebounds: 448 (1.8 rpg)
- Assists: 626 (2.0 apg)
- Stats at NBA.com
- Stats at Basketball Reference

William A. Gabor (May 13, 1922 – June 4, 2019) was an American professional basketball player. A 5'11" guard/forward known as "Billy the Bullet", Gabor played collegiately at Syracuse University in the 1940s. He averaged 12.1 points per game during his freshman year before joining the United States Army Air Corps in 1943. He returned to Syracuse in 1945 and played three more seasons, finishing with a (then) team-record 1,344 career points. Gabor's jersey was retired by Syracuse University on March 1, 2009.

Gabor spent his professional career with the Syracuse Nationals of the National Basketball League and later the National Basketball Association. He played with Syracuse until injuries forced him into retirement in 1955. In his NBA career, Gabor averaged 9.8 points per game and logged one NBA All-Star Game appearance. He won a league championship with Syracuse in 1955.

== Time at Syracuse University ==
When Gabor first began playing basketball at Syracuse, there was a freshman and varsity team. He started all the freshmen games and then would suit up for the varsity game. Gabor started his first game on varsity against Cornell in 1942–43 season and scored 22 points. He started every game after that.

Gabor holds many school records, including:

- Only person to lead the team in scoring all four years they took the court
- First to score 400 points in a single season
- First to score over 1,000 points in a career

He held the all-time scoring record until Dave Bing bested it.

On May 1, 2009, Gabor was invited back to the Carrier Dome to see his jersey number 17 retired.

In his time at Syracuse University, Gabor was a member of Theta Chi Fraternity.

== Family ==
Gabor was married once. He had three children: Bill, Bob and Hallie, and eight grandchildren: Annie, Emily, SarahRose, Malone, Mimi, Jack, Will, and Madison. He last resided in Jupiter, Florida.

== NBA career statistics ==
Legend
| GP | Games played | GS | Games started | MPG | Minutes per game |
| FG% | Field goal percentage | 3P% | 3-point field goal percentage | FT% | Free throw percentage |
| RPG | Rebounds per game | APG | Assists per game | SPG | Steals per game |
| BPG | Blocks per game | PPG | Points per game | **Bold** | Career high |
| † | Won an NBA championship |

=== Regular season ===
| Year | Team | GP | MPG | FG% | FT% | RPG | APG | PPG |
|---|---|---|---|---|---|---|---|---|
| 1949–50 | Syracuse | 56 | – | .337 | .689 | – | 1.9 | 10.9 |
| 1950–51 | Syracuse | 61 | – | .342 | .740 | **2.5** | 2.0 | **11.3** |
| 1951–52 | Syracuse | 57 | 19.0 | .322 | **.776** | 1.6 | 1.5 | 8.6 |
| 1952–53 | Syracuse | 69 | 19.4 | .350 | .764 | 1.5 | 1.9 | 9.4 |
| 1953–54 | Syracuse | 61 | **19.9** | **.370** | .716 | 1.6 | 2.7 | 9.0 |
| 1954–55† | Syracuse | 3 | 15.7 | .318 | .600 | 1.7 | **3.7** | 5.7 |
| Career | | 307 | 19.4 | .344 | .737 | 1.8 | 2.0 | 9.8 |
| All-Star | | 1 | 25.0 | .000 | .000 | 5.0 | 2.0 | 0.0 |

=== Playoffs ===
| Year | Team | GP | MPG | FG% | FT% | RPG | APG | PPG |
|---|---|---|---|---|---|---|---|---|
| 1950 | Syracuse | **10** | – | .258 | **.839** | – | 2.5 | 7.6 |
| 1951 | Syracuse | 7 | – | .375 | .643 | **2.9** | **2.6** | **9.0** |
| 1952 | Syracuse | 7 | 11.4 | .333 | .750 | 0.9 | 1.4 | 4.9 |
| 1953 | Syracuse | 2 | 14.0 | **.417** | .615 | 1.5 | 1.0 | **9.0** |
| 1954 | Syracuse | **10** | **19.6** | .289 | .700 | 2.8 | 1.9 | 7.6 |
| Career | | 307 | 19.4 | .344 | .737 | 1.8 | 2.0 | 9.8 |
