= Matthew P. Kennedy =

American basketball referee

Matthew P. "Pat" Kennedy (January 28, 1908 – June 16, 1957) was an American basketball referee.

A native of Hoboken, New Jersey, Kennedy officiated over 4,000 games from the 1928 to 1956. He worked for the NBA, NCAA, and Harlem Globetrotters and became well known for his intense, theatrical style of calling plays. Kennedy was inducted into the Basketball Hall of Fame in 1959, becoming the first referee to earn such honors.
