= John Nucatola =

American basketball player, coach, and referee

John Nucatola (November 17, 1907 – May 9, 2000) was an American professional basketball player, coach and referee. He was enshrined in the Naismith Memorial Basketball Hall of Fame on 1 May 1978.

== Biography ==
John Nucatola officiated some of the greatest games in the ECAC, Atlantic Coast, Southern and Big Eight Conferences, along with the NCAA and NIT tournaments. He also dabbled in the professional arenas of the American Basketball League, Basketball Association of America, and the NBA.

Nucatola was one of the original referees in the NBA when the league was organized as the BAA in 1946. Nucatola was one of the founding fathers of the College Basketball Officials Association and served as supervisor of officials for the Ivy League and the ECAC before being named the NBA Supervisor of Officials. In a life dedicated to the development of basketball and basketball officiating, Nucatola conducted more than 1,200 clinics worldwide, as well as authoring Officiating Basketball.

He was called basketball's "greatest official" by Hall of Famer Clair Bee. Nucatola believed the referee's most important duty was to make the right call rather than merely assert authority. He often urged officials to be willing to reconsider their calls, and was a strong advocate of the three-man officiating crew.
