= Andrew Levane =

American basketball player and coach (1920–2012)

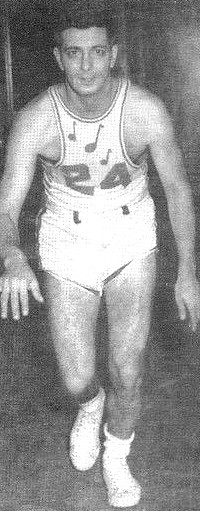

Personal information
- Born: April 11, 1920 Brooklyn, New York, U.S.
- Died: April 30, 2012 (aged 92)
- Listed height: 6 ft 2 in (1.88 m)
- Listed weight: 190 lb (86 kg)

Career information
- High school: James Madison (Brooklyn, New York)
- College: St. John's (1940–1943)
- Playing career: 1945–1953
- Position: Small forward / shooting guard
- Number: 13, 14, 3

Career history

Playing
- 1945–1949: Rochester Royals
- 1949–1950: Syracuse Nationals
- 1951–1952: Elmira Colonels
- 1952–1953: Milwaukee Hawks

Coaching
- 1952–1954: Milwaukee Hawks
- 1958–1960: New York Knicks
- 1961–1962: St. Louis Hawks

Career highlights
- NBL champion (1946); Haggerty Award winner (1943)
- Stats at NBA.com
- Stats at Basketball Reference

Andrew Joseph "Fuzzy" Levane (April 11, 1920 – April 30, 2012) was an American professional basketball player and coach. A 6'2" guard, he played collegiately at St. John's University. He spent three years in the NBA and its predecessor league, the Basketball Association of America, playing for the Rochester Royals, the Syracuse Nationals and the Milwaukee Hawks. In his final year with the Hawks he was a player-coach.

Levane coached the Hawks for one additional season, then coached the New York Knickerbockers. He returned to the Hawks, now playing in St. Louis, for a final season in 1962.

Levane's son, Neil, a.k.a. Fuzzy, was a basketball star at Great Neck South high school on Long Island, New York from 1963 to 1967. Following his senior season, he was listed as a fifth-team Parade Magazine All-American. After playing for a year on the freshmen team at the University of Houston, he transferred to St. John's University in Queens where he played from 1968 to 1970.

In 1992 his legacy was honored by the basketball family of New York City with his induction into the New York City Basketball of Fame

Andrew Levane died April 30, 2012, of heart failure, at the age of 92.

== Career statistics ==
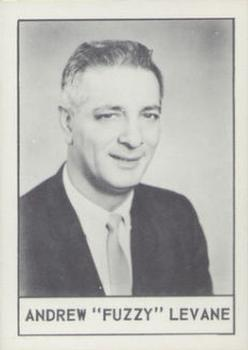
Levane as Hawks coach

Legend
GP	Games played	MPG	Minutes per game
FG%	Field-goal percentage	FT%	Free-throw percentage
RPG	Rebounds per game	APG	Assists per game
PPG	Points per game	**Bold**	Career high

=== NBA ===
==== Regular season ====
Year	Team	GP	MPG	FG%	FT%	RPG	APG	PPG
1948–49	Rochester	36	–	.285	.619	–	1.1	3.4
1949–50	Syracuse	**60**	–	**.333**	.635	–	**2.6**	**5.5**
1952–53	Milwaukee	7	**9.7**	.125	**.667**	**1.3**	1.3	1.1
Career		103	9.7	.310	.633	1.3	2.0	4.5

==== Playoffs ====
Year	Team	GP	MPG	FG%	FT%	RPG	APG	PPG
1950	Syracuse	9	–	.351	1.000	–	1.4	3.4

== Head coaching record ==
Legend
Regular season	G	Games coached	W	Games won	L	Games lost	W–L %	Win–loss %
Playoffs	PG	Playoff games	PW	Playoff wins	PL	Playoff losses	PW–L %	Playoff win–loss %

=== NBA ===
Team	Year	G	W	L	W–L%	Finish	PG	PW	PL	PW–L%	Result
Milwaukee	1952–53	71	27	44	.380	5th in West	—	—	—	—	Missed playoffs
Milwaukee	1953–54	46	11	35	.239	(replaced)	—	—	—	—	—
New York	1958–59	72	40	32	.556	2nd in East	2	0	2	.000	Lost in Eastern semifinals
New York	1959–60	27	8	19	.296	(resigned)	—	—	—	—	—
St. Louis	1961–62	60	20	40	.333	(reassigned)	—	—	—	—	—
Career		276	106	170	.384		2	0	2	.000	
