= Ed Peterson =

American basketball player

Personal information
- Born: June 27, 1924 Buffalo, New York, U.S.
- Died: March 20, 1984 (aged 59) Syracuse, New York, U.S.
- Listed height: 6 ft 9 in (2.06 m)
- Listed weight: 220 lb (100 kg)

Career information
- College: Cornell (1945–1948)
- NBA draft: 1948: -- round, --
- Drafted by: New York Knicks
- Playing career: 1948–1951
- Position: Center
- Number: 50, 13, 20

Career history
- 1948–1950: Syracuse Nationals
- 1950–1951: Tri-Cities Blackhawks

Career NBA statistics
- Points: 804 (7.0 pg)
- Rebounds: 288 (5.4 rpg)
- Assists: 99 (0.9 apg)
- Stats at NBA.com
- Stats at Basketball Reference

Edward T. Peterson (June 27, 1924 – March 20, 1984) was an American professional basketball player.

A 6'9" center from Cornell University, Peterson played three seasons in the NBL and NBA as a member of the Syracuse Nationals and Tri-Cities Blackhawks.

He was elected into the Sphinx Head Society during his senior year at Cornell University.

== Career statistics ==
=== NBA ===
Legend
GP	Games played	GS	Games started	MPG	Minutes per game
FG%	Field goal percentage	3P%	3-point field goal percentage	FT%	Free throw percentage
RPG	Rebounds per game	APG	Assists per game	SPG	Steals per game
BPG	Blocks per game	PPG	Points per game	**Bold**	Career high

==== Regular season ====
Year	Team	GP	FG%	FT%	RPG	APG	PPG
1949–50	Syracuse	**62**	**.428**	.600		.5	7.2
1950–51	Syracuse	17	.370	.606	2.2	.5	4.7
1950–51	Tri-Cities	36	.330	**.675**	**6.9**	**1.6**	**7.8**
Career		115	.384	.627	5.4	.9	7.0

==== Playoffs ====
Year	Team	GP	FG%	FT%	RPG	APG	PPG
1949–50	Syracuse	11	.419	.571		.1	4.0
