= Johnny Macknowski =

Russian-born American basketball player (1923–2024)

Personal information
- Born: January 7, 1923 Russian Soviet Federative Socialist Republic, Soviet Union
- Died: April 8, 2024 (aged 101)
- Listed height: 6 ft 0 in (1.83 m)
- Listed weight: 180 lb (82 kg)

Career information
- High school: Lincoln (Jersey City, New Jersey)
- College: Seton Hall (1945–1948)
- BAA draft: 1948: – round, –
- Drafted by: Rochester Royals
- Playing career: 1947–1951
- Position: Guard / forward
- Number: 5

Career history
- 1947–1948: Scranton Miners
- 1948–1951: Syracuse Nationals

Career NBA statistics
- Points: 823 (7.0 ppg)
- Assists: 134 (1.1 apg)
- Stats at NBA.com
- Stats at Basketball Reference

John Andrew Macknowsky (born Macknowski and formerly Mackin; January 7, 1923 – April 8, 2024) was a Russian-born American professional basketball player. He played in the National Basketball League (NBL) and National Basketball Association (NBA) for the Syracuse Nationals franchise as the team moved from the NBL into the NBA.

Macknowski played college basketball for the Seton Hall Pirates where he started as a freshman in the 1941–42 season and then served three years of military service during World War II. He returned to the Pirates and played from 1945 to 1948.

== Personal life and death ==
After his playing career, Macknowski worked as an English, history and philosophy teacher.

In 1952, Macknowski, his wife and his first daughter changed their surname from Macknowski to Mackin. He had three daughters with his wife, Olga, who predeceased him in December 2016, aged 90. As of September 2017, Macknowski resided at a retirement village in Morristown, Tennessee. On January 7, 2023, Macknowski became the second former NBA player to turn 100, after Whitey Von Nieda did so in June 2022. Macknowski died on April 8, 2024, aged 101.

== Career statistics ==
Legend
GP	Games played	FGM	Field-goals made
FG%	Field-goal percentage	FTM	Free-throws made
FTA	Free-throws attempted	FT%	Free-throw percentage
RPG	Rebounds per game	APG	Assists per game
PTS	Points	PPG	Points per game
**Bold**	Career high

=== NBL ===
==== Regular season ====
Year	Team	GP	FGM	FTM	FTA	FT%	PTS	PPG
1948–49	Syracuse	62	146	128	178	.719	420	6.8

==== Playoffs ====
Year	Team	GP	FGM	FTM	FTA	FT%	PTS	PPG
1949	Syracuse	6	3	7	9	.778	13	2.2

=== NBA ===
==== Regular season ====
Year	Team	GP	FG%	FT%	RPG	APG	PPG
1949–50	Syracuse	**59**	**.333**	**.736**		1.1	**7.4**
1950–51	Syracuse	58	.301	.718	1.9	**1.2**	6.6
Career		117	.317	.727	1.9	1.1	7.0

==== Playoffs ====
Year	Team	GP	FG%	FT%	RPG	APG	PPG
1949–50	Syracuse	**11**	.390	**.765**		1.9	**10.6**
1950–51	Syracuse	2	**.462**	.333	3.5	**2.0**	6.5
Career		13	.398	.741	3.5	1.9	10.0
