= Paul Seymour (basketball) =

American professional basketball player and coach (1928–1998)

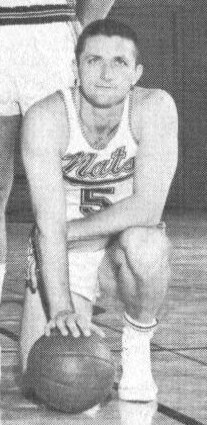
- Seymour with the Syracuse Nationals in 1958

Personal information
- Born: January 30, 1928 Toledo, Ohio, U.S.
- Died: May 5, 1998 (aged 70) Jensen Beach, Florida, U.S.
- Listed height: 6 ft 1 in (1.85 m)
- Listed weight: 180 lb (82 kg)

Career information
- High school: Woodward (Toledo, Ohio)
- College: Toledo (1945–1946)
- Playing career: 1946–1960
- Position: Point guard / shooting guard
- Number: 24, 25, 8, 5
- Coaching career: 1956–1969

Career history

Playing
- 1946–1947: Toledo Jeeps
- 1947–1948: Baltimore Bullets
- 1948–1960: Syracuse Nationals

Coaching
- 1956–1960: Syracuse Nationals
- 1960–1962: St. Louis Hawks
- 1965–1966: Baltimore Bullets
- 1966–1967: Scranton Miners
- 1968–1969: Detroit Pistons

Career highlights
- As player: NBA champion (1955); 3× NBA All-Star (1953–1955); 2× All-NBA Second Team (1954, 1955); As coach: NBA All-Star Game head coach (1961)

Career NBA statistics
- Points: 5,836 (9.4 ppg)
- Rebounds: 1,694 (3.1 rpg)
- Assists: 2,341 (3.8 apg)
- Stats at NBA.com
- Stats at Basketball Reference

Paul Norman Seymour (January 30, 1928 – May 5, 1998) was an American professional basketball player and coach. Seymour played college basketball for the Toledo Rockets before playing professionally in the National Basketball Association (NBA). In the NBA, he played for the Baltimore Bullets and Syracuse Nationals. While with the Nationals, Seymour was named to the NBA All-Star game in three consecutive years, from 1953 to 1955. He also coached in the NBA for the Nationals, St. Louis Hawks, Baltimore Bullets, and Detroit Pistons.

== Playing career ==
A 6'1" guard, Seymour played collegiately at the University of Toledo, and had a 12-year career in the NBA and its predecessor, the Basketball Association of America (BAA). He played his first season for the Baltimore Bullets of the BAA; the remainder of his career was with the Syracuse Nationals.

Seymour was named to the All-NBA second team in the 1954–55 and 1954–55 seasons and played in three NBA All-Star Games during his career. He won a championship with the Nationals in the 1954–55 season. For a good part of his career, Seymour was a player-coach for the Nats.

Seymour still shares, with former teammate Red Rocha, the NBA record for most minutes in a playoff game with 67.

== Coaching career ==
After finishing his playing career, Seymour continued a successful coaching career in the NBA, coaching three more teams. Altogether he coached four teams in eight seasons. In 1961, he was the head coach of the Western Division Team in the All Star Game.

Seymour was mentioned in the ESPN documentary, Black Magic, which told the story of African-Americans and basketball. In a segment about Cleo Hill, it was revealed that during the 1961–62 season, Bob Pettit and Cliff Hagan approached management and complained that Hill was taking too many shots. (Allegedly, this was just a cover-up for their desire to not play with an African-American teammate.) Management granted their wish, telling Seymour to severely diminish Hill's offensive role. Seymour's refusal resulted in his dismissal 14 games into the season on November 17, 1961. His replacement on an interim basis was Pettit. Seymour had no ill feelings towards team owner Ben Kerner, stating, "He didn't fire me. The players did."

While coaching at Baltimore during the 1965–1966 season, Seymour deliberately ended Johnny Kerr's then-record consecutive-games-played streak of 844 games by benching the team captain for one game. According to Kerr, only after the game did Seymour tell Kerr about his intention to end Kerr's streak, saying, "This will take the pressure off you."

Seymour was the head coach for the Scranton Miners of the Eastern Professional Basketball League (EPBL) during the 1966–67 season.

== Later years ==
Seymour was featured in the book, Basketball History in Syracuse, Hoops Roots by author Mark Allen Baker published by The History Press in 2010. The book is an introduction to professional basketball in Syracuse and includes teams like (Vic Hanson's) All-Americans, the Syracuse Reds and the Syracuse Nationals (1946–1963).

Seymour was elected to the first class of the Greater Syracuse Sports Hall of Fame in 1987 along with owner Dan Biasone and NBA all-time great Dolph Schayes.

== Career playing statistics ==
Legend
| GP | Games played | GS | Games started | MPG | Minutes per game |
| FG% | Field goal percentage | 3P% | 3-point field goal percentage | FT% | Free throw percentage |
| RPG | Rebounds per game | APG | Assists per game | SPG | Steals per game |
| BPG | Blocks per game | PPG | Points per game | **Bold** | Career high |
| † | Won an NBA championship |

=== BAA/NBA ===
==== Regular season ====
| Year | Team | GP | MPG | FG% | FT% | RPG | APG | PPG |
|---|---|---|---|---|---|---|---|---|
| 1947–48 | Baltimore | 22 | – | .267 | .595 | – | .3 | 3.5 |
| 1949–50 | Syracuse | 62 | – | .334 | .716 | – | 3.0 | 7.7 |
| 1950–51 | Syracuse | 51 | – | .325 | .736 | 3.8 | 3.7 | 7.2 |
| 1951–52 | Syracuse | 66 | 33.5 | .335 | .759 | 3.4 | 3.3 | 9.1 |
| 1952–53 | Syracuse | 67 | 40.1 | **.383** | .817 | 3.7 | 4.4 | 14.2 |
| 1953–54 | Syracuse | 71 | 38.4 | .377 | .813 | 4.1 | 5.1 | 13.1 |
| 1954–55† | Syracuse | **72** | **41.0** | .362 | .811 | **4.3** | **6.7** | **14.6** |
| 1955–56 | Syracuse | 57 | 32.0 | .339 | .807 | 2.7 | 4.8 | 11.3 |
| 1956–57 | Syracuse | 65 | 19.0 | .324 | .821 | 2.0 | 3.0 | 6.0 |
| 1957–58 | Syracuse | 64 | 11.9 | .340 | .841 | 1.7 | 1.5 | 4.2 |
| 1958–59 | Syracuse | 21 | 12.7 | .327 | **.897** | 1.9 | 1.7 | 4.3 |
| 1959–60 | Syracuse | 4 | 1.8 | .000 | .000 | .3 | .0 | .0 |
| Career | | 622 | 30.1 | .350 | .792 | 3.1 | 3.8 | 9.4 |
| All-Star | | 3 | 16.2 | .412 | .875 | 2.3 | 2.0 | 7.0 |

==== Playoffs ====
| Year | Team | GP | MPG | FG% | FT% | RPG | APG | PPG |
|---|---|---|---|---|---|---|---|---|
| 1950 | Syracuse | 11 | – | .290 | .857 | – | 3.1 | 7.1 |
| 1951 | Syracuse | 7 | – | .208 | .667 | 3.7 | 3.6 | 4.9 |
| 1952 | Syracuse | 7 | 38.6 | **.417** | .814 | 3.7 | 3.6 | 12.1 |
| 1953 | Syracuse | 2 | **56.0** | .375 | **.947** | **5.0** | 4.0 | **18.0** |
| 1954 | Syracuse | **13** | 43.0 | .413 | .809 | 2.6 | 4.6 | 14.9 |
| 1955† | Syracuse | 11 | 37.3 | .309 | .900 | 3.9 | **6.8** | 12.5 |
| 1956 | Syracuse | 7 | 21.9 | .291 | .750 | 1.6 | 2.6 | 6.7 |
| 1957 | Syracuse | 5 | 19.6 | .216 | .833 | 2.0 | 1.6 | 4.2 |
| 1958 | Syracuse | 3 | 16.7 | .348 | .667 | 1.3 | 1.3 | 6.0 |
| Career | | 66 | 34.4 | .329 | .824 | 3.0 | 3.9 | 9.8 |

== Head coaching record ==
Legend
| Regular season | G | Games coached | W | Games won | L | Games lost | W–L % | Win–loss % |
| Playoffs | PG | Playoff games | PW | Playoff wins | PL | Playoff losses | PW–L % | Playoff win–loss % |

=== NBA ===
| Team | Year | G | W | L | W–L% | Finish | PG | PW | PL | PW–L% | Result |
|---|---|---|---|---|---|---|---|---|---|---|---|
| Syracuse | 1956–57 | 60 | 34 | 26 | .567 | 2nd in East | 5 | 2 | 3 | .400 | Lost Division finals |
| Syracuse | 1957–58 | 72 | 41 | 31 | .569 | 2nd in East | 3 | 1 | 2 | .333 | Lost Division semifinals |
| Syracuse | 1958–59 | 72 | 35 | 37 | .486 | 3rd in East | 9 | 5 | 4 | .556 | Lost in Division finals |
| Syracuse | 1959–60 | 75 | 45 | 30 | .600 | 3rd in East | 3 | 1 | 2 | .333 | Lost in Division semifinals |
| St. Louis | 1960–61 | 79 | 51 | 28 | .646 | 1st in West | 12 | 5 | 7 | .417 | Lost in NBA finals |
| St. Louis | 1961–62 | 14 | 5 | 9 | .263 | (fired) | — | — | — | — | — |
| Baltimore | 1965–66 | 80 | 38 | 42 | .475 | 2nd in West | 3 | 0 | 3 | .000 | Lost in Division semifinals |
| Detroit | 1968–69 | 60 | 22 | 38 | .367 | 6th in East | — | — | — | — | Missed playoffs |
| Career | | 512 | 271 | 241 | .529 | | 35 | 14 | 21 | .400 | |
