= Toyota Coliseum =

Indoor arena in Geddes, New York, United States

Coordinates: 43°4′28″N 76°13′7″W

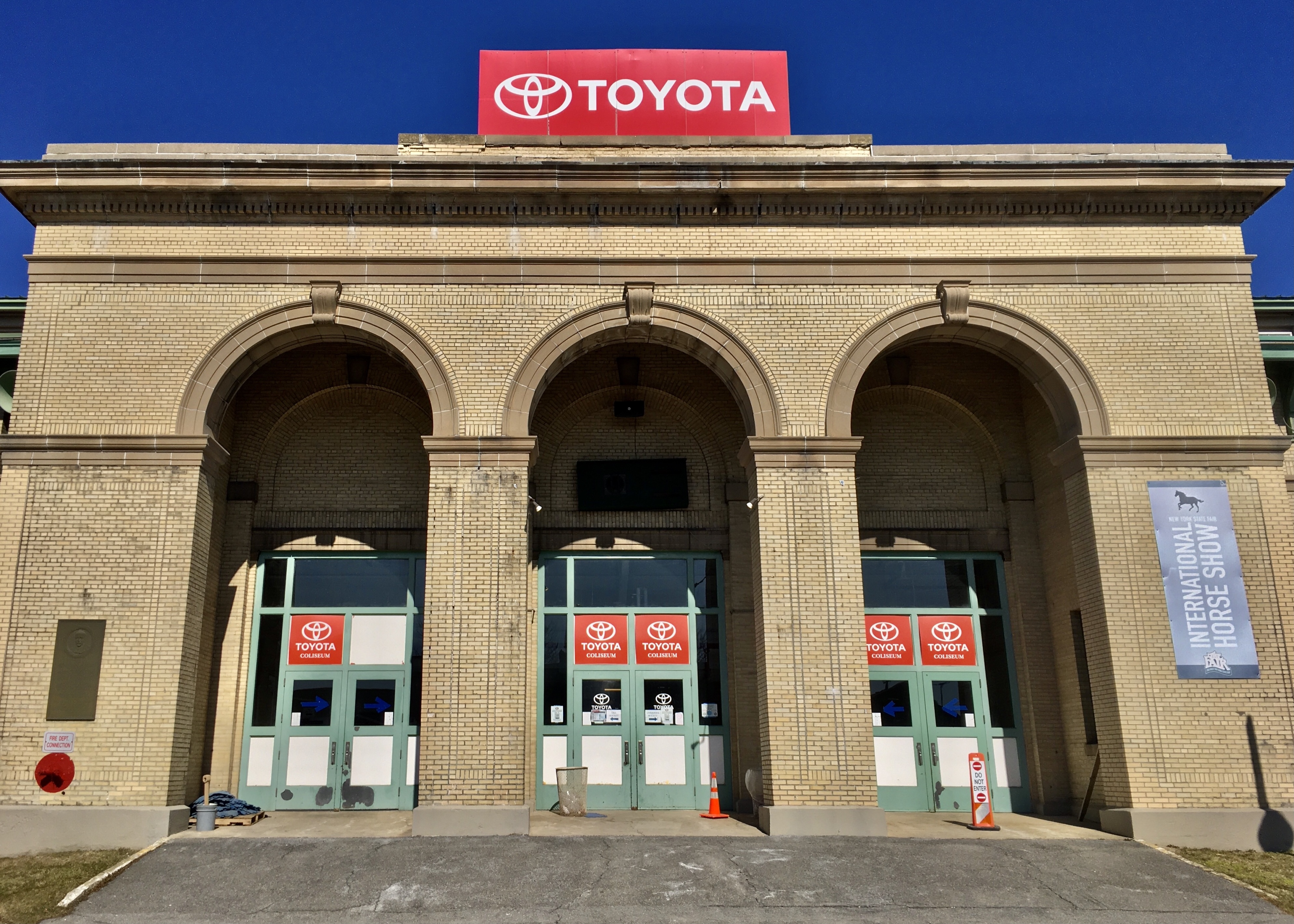
Toyota Coliseum entrance, March 2021

The Toyota Coliseum, formerly the State Fair Coliseum, is an indoor arena in Geddes, New York. It hosted the Syracuse Nationals from 1946 to 1951 as well as the Syracuse Stars of the American Hockey League. It also served as a temporary home to the Syracuse Orange men's basketball team following the burning of their on-campus gymnasium, Archbold Gymnasium, in 1947 until the opening of the Onondaga County War Memorial in 1951. The arena held 7,500 people and was built in 1927. It is owned by the State of New York under the Great New York State Fair. After undergoing renovations, the seating capacity was reduced to 3,600 and is now primarily used for horse shows. Much of the previous infrastructure, including the scoreboard and announcers' booth, are still in place.

It is expected to become the home of the CNY Blue Devils indoor football team expected to join American Indoor Football for 2027.
