= Raj Bhathal =

American businessman

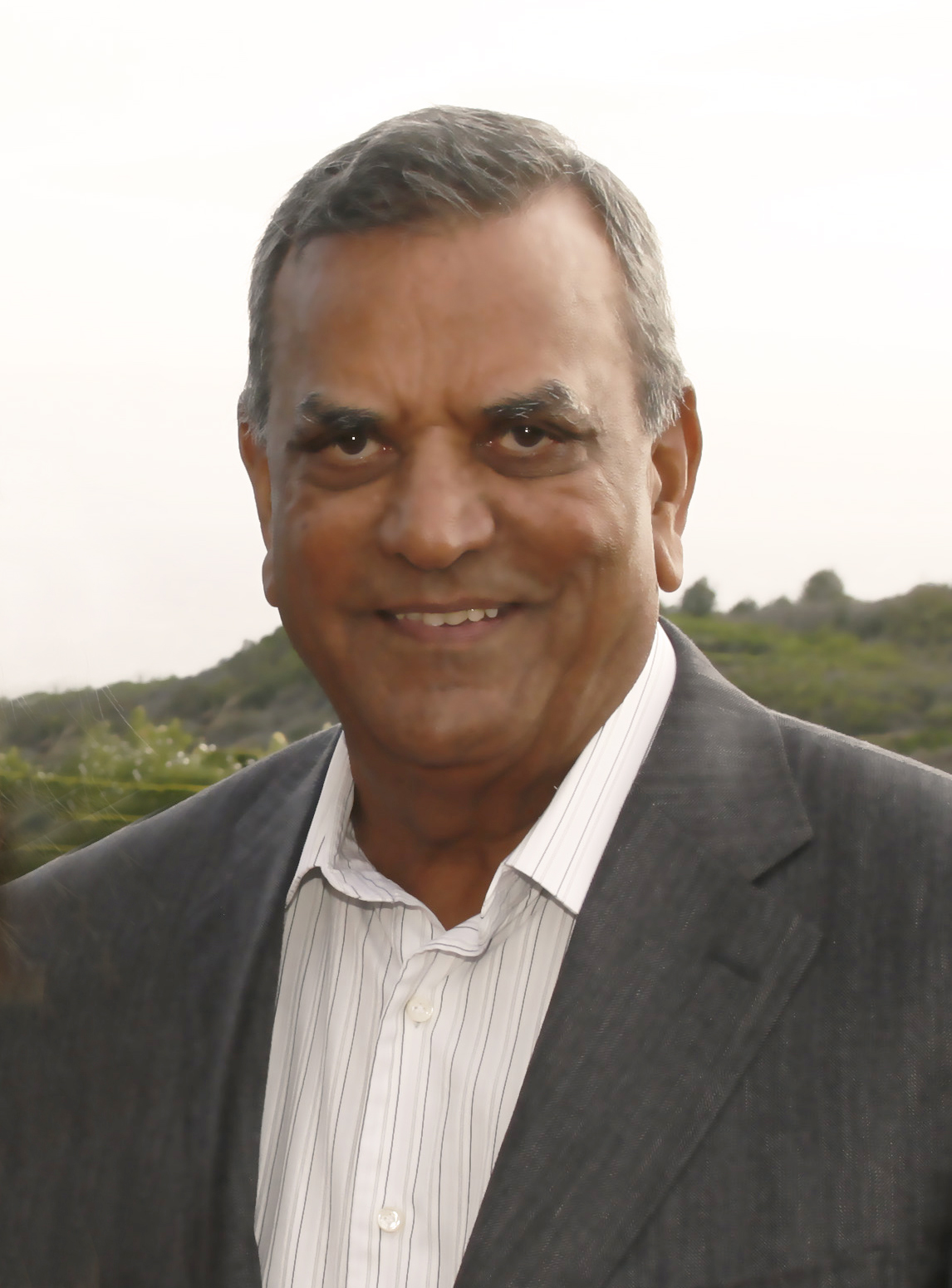
- Born: India
- Education: University of Arizona, MBA
- Occupation: Businessman
- Known for: Founder and former CEO of RAJ Manufacturing; Co-Chairman and Alternate Governor of the Sacramento Kings
- Spouse: Marta
- Children: Alex Bhathal; Lisa Bhathal Merage

Raj Bhathal is an American business executive. He is the founder and former CEO of American swimwear company Raj Manufacturing, and is part of the ownership group that owns the NBA's Sacramento Kings.

== Early life and education ==
Bhathal was born in India and immigrated to the US in 1960. He earned an MBA from the University of Arizona. He moved to Manhattan Beach, CA after graduation to find an aerospace job, but due to a hiring freeze, took a position with a swimwear company instead. He met and then married his wife Marta shortly thereafter.

== Career ==
=== Raj Manufacturing ===
In 1967, Bhathal and his wife founded RAJ Manufacturing in Santa Ana, CA. They moved the company to Tustin, CA in 1978. By 1992, RAJ Manufacturing was one of the largest swimwear manufacturers in the United States. In 2007, his two children led a private equity-backed purchase of the company from Bhathal and his wife Marta, reportedly the largest private equity deal in the history of the swimwear industry. The elder Bhathals remained with the company as directors. The Bhathal family later bought the firm back from private equity. By 2019, Bhathal had exited the swimwear business to focus on the family's asset management firm, RAJ Capital.

=== Orlando Thunder ===
Bhathal is reportedly a sports fan and was a Los Angeles Rams ticket holder. In November 1990, he was introduced as the owner of the Orlando Thunder, a member of the World League of American Football. In 1993, the NFL owners voted to suspend World League operations. The league would relaunch in 1995 as an all-Europe league.

=== Sacramento Kings ===
In May 2013, Bhathal was named one of the investors in a consortium that purchased a majority stake in the NBA's Sacramento Kings from the Maloof family, for a reported $348 million. The family invested in several efforts to build a new basketball arena and revitalize downtown Sacramento.

=== Raj Capital ===
Raj Capital is the Bhathal family office, founded in 2007 and run by Bhathal's son Alex and daughter Lisa. The firm focuses on investments in sports, real estate and consumer products. In January 2024, Bhathal approved Raj Capital's $63 million purchase of the Portland Thorns of the National Women's Soccer League.

=== Other professional activities ===
As of July 2024, Bhathal was a member of the Chapman University board of trustees.

== Personal life ==
Bhathal lives in Newport Beach, CA, is married to wife Marta, and has two children: son Alex Bhathal, and daughter Lisa Bhathal Merage. He is of Punjabi descent.
