= Light the Beam =

Rallying call of the Sacramento Kings

"Light the Beam!" is a chant and rallying call in support of the National Basketball Association (NBA)'s Sacramento Kings. Referring to the Kings lighting a purple beam of light from Golden 1 Center following a win, the phrase originated early during the Kings' 2022–23 season. The phrase gained popularity among Kings fans, particularly due to the team's improved performance compared to prior years. The performances of point guard De'Aaron Fox and center Domantas Sabonis specifically have been associated with the chant. Finding success after the adoption of the beam, the Kings were nicknamed the "Beam Team" during the season.

== Background ==
The Kings relocated from Kansas City to Sacramento in 1985; since the move, they have notoriously performed poorly, with their only successful stretch coming between 1999 and 2006. Since then, the Kings had become a "perennial laughingstock" in the league.

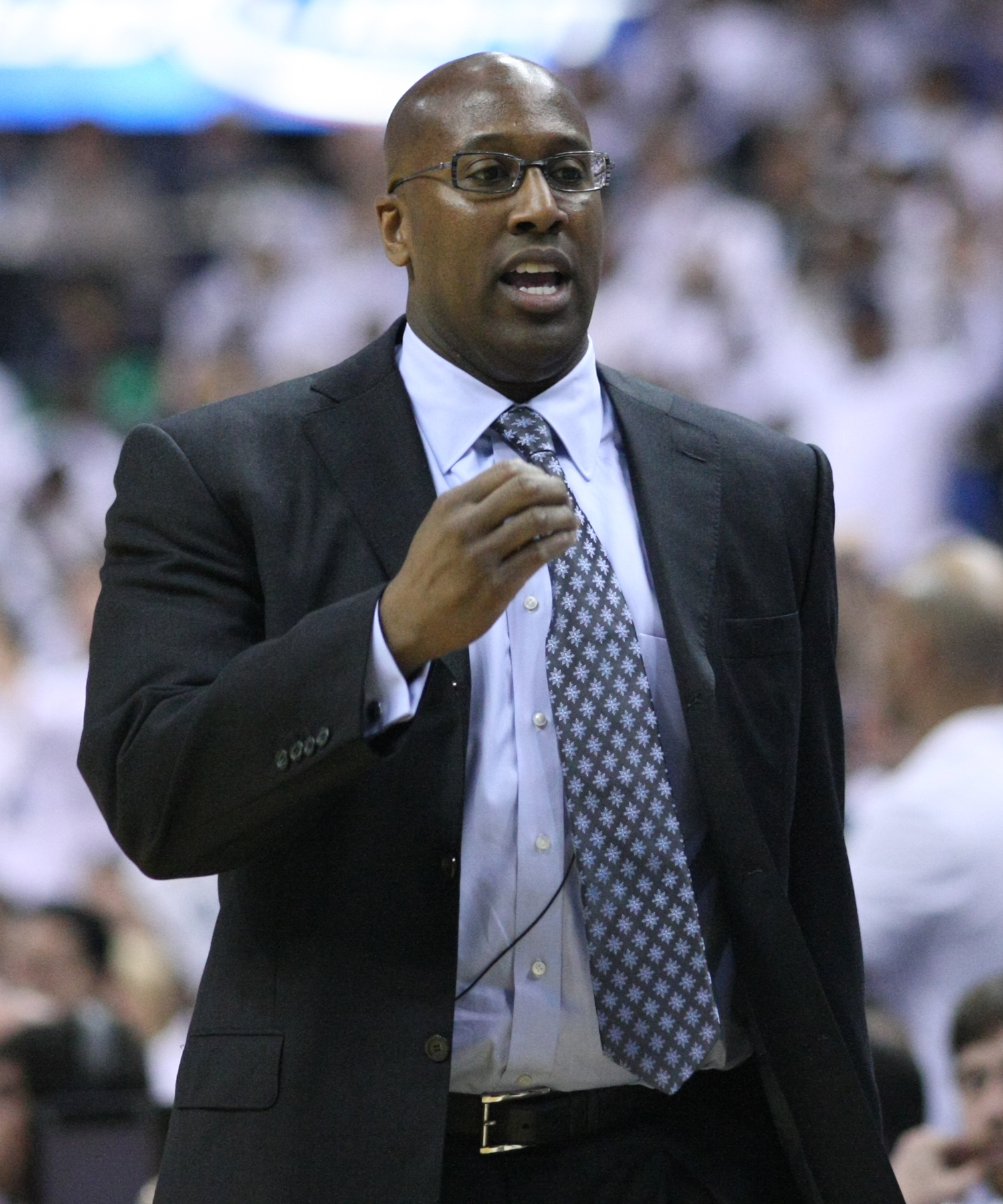
Hired in the 2022 offseason, Mike Brown is credited with helping the Kings improve in the 2022–23 season and end the team's playoff drought

In May 2013, Vivek Ranadivé purchased the Kings franchise, becoming its owner and construction for the Golden 1 Center began the following year. The arena had its grand opening ahead of the 2016–17 season. Prior to that season, the idea to light a purple beam first came about. The team's president of business operations John Rinehart conceived of the idea to light a purple beam over the Kings' Golden 1 Center arena. Rinehart was inspired by the Los Angeles Angels' Big A Sign: a 230-foot metal structure shaped like the letter A with a halo that lights up in the team's parking lot after each win. Consulting with Ranadivé during a brainstorming session, the idea further materialized.

Speaking to NBC Sports California, Ranadivé recalled a conversation with David Kelley, in which Kelley told him "Look, you've got to figure out what your purple lights are." Asking for clarification, Kelley elaborated "Well, if you ever go on Virgin [Airlines], you step on the plane and you sit down and you see these purple lights. You immediately know that this is going to be different from any other experience you've ever had on any other airline. It's going to be unique, it's going to be special, and you look forward to it." Officially called the "Laser Space Cannon", the beam has been credited to Tim Anderson, owner and founder of Nu-Salt Laser International. The beam is powered in the form of 1,000 watts of RGB laser power, being noted to be the brightest full-color laser equipment in the world. Originally powered by four lasers, Ranadivé was asked to add more lasers to make the beam brighter. Once updated, six lasers used 1,800 watts of total power for the beam.

Noted to blast into space, Ranadivé commented that the beam is lit "further up than the human eye can see." The Kings organization submitted an application in the summer of 2022 to the Federal Aviation Administration (FAA), seeking permission to light the beam. The agency approved the application, determining that planes do not fly over Golden 1 Center and would not be affected by the laser. Though police and sheriff's office helicopters do fly over the arena, they are notified by the FAA when the beam is lit.

In February 2022, the Kings traded Tyrese Haliburton for center Domantas Sabonis, a widely panned move at the time. In May, the team hired Mike Brown as their head coach after finishing the 2021–22 season with a 30–52 record. Now with Brown at the helm, the Kings entered the 2022–23 NBA season having not made the playoffs since 2006, with the 16-year long absence being the longest post-season drought in NBA history. As the Seattle Mariners clinched a wild card spot in the 2022 MLB playoffs, the Kings' post-season drought also became the longest active among all teams in the four major North American sports leagues.

== "Light the Beam!" and 2022–23 season ==
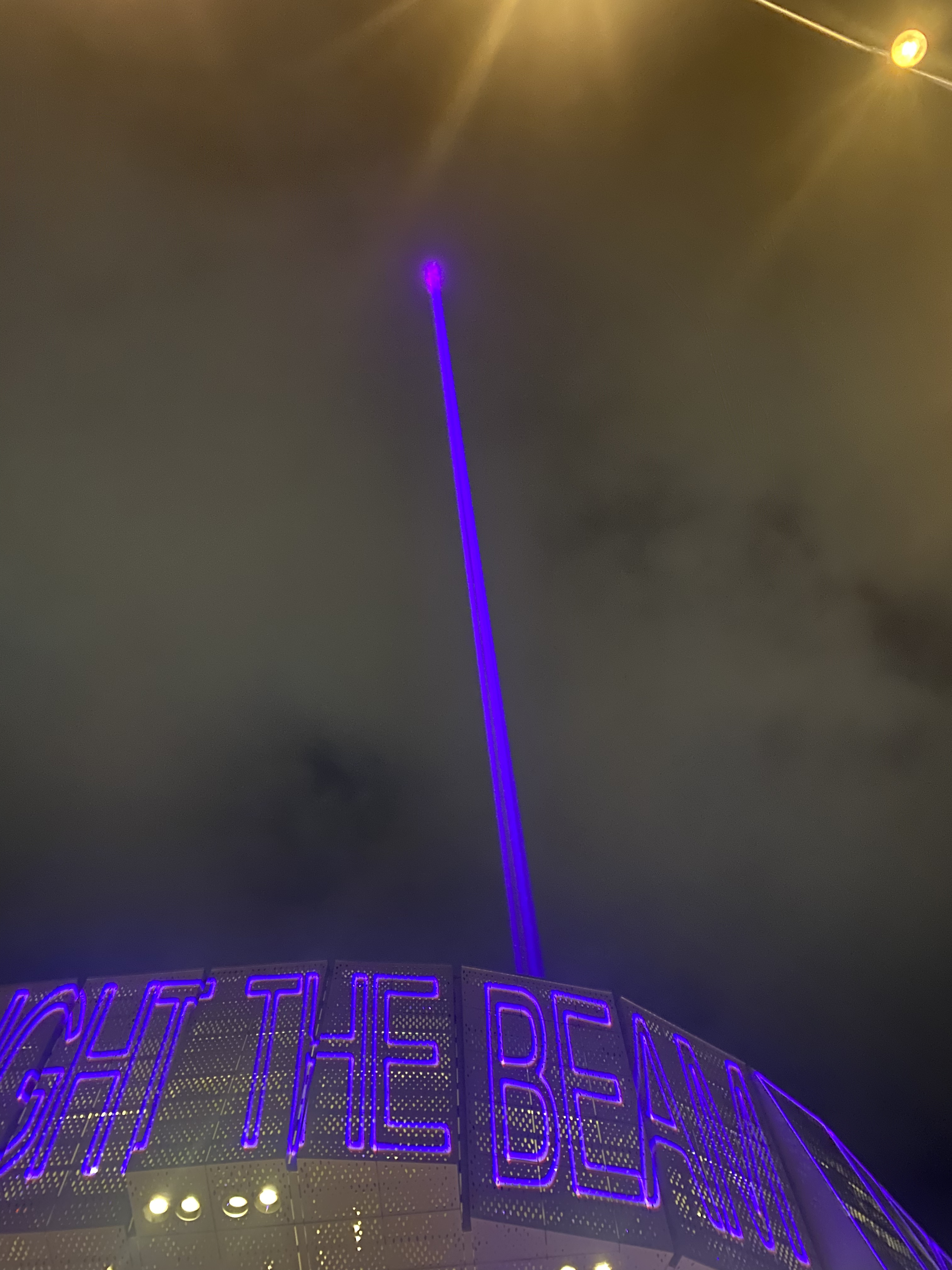
The beam on Golden 1 Center following a Sacramento Kings victory

In 2022, the Kings introduced their purple beam on September 16, a date celebrated as "916 Day" in Sacramento, established in 2018, 916 being the original area code for the city. However, the team first lit the beam following a win after they defeated the Miami Heat on October 29. After home wins, the beam is often lit by a player or a personality in front of the Sacramento crowd at Golden 1 Center; rapper 50 Cent, for example, lit the beam after a Kings win over the Indiana Pacers. Slamson, the Kings' mascot, has also been noted to light the beam.

The Kings began the 2022–23 season losing their first four games, but began to show improvement throughout the season. They racked up wins in November, at one point seven in a row, their longest win streak since 2004. The team's social media staff first tweeted about the beam on November 2, with their first video of its lighting coming shortly thereafter on November 13. Kings player Kevin Huerter further propelled the beam's popularity on social media with the hashtag "#BeamTeam". Sabonis stated that prior to Huerter's nicknaming of the Kings as the Beam Team, the team had not really paid much attention to the beam. The players on the team later named Huerter as the biggest proponent of the beam among those on the roster.

Sacramento's November 15 game against the Brooklyn Nets, which resulted in their then-fourth consecutive victory, was their first to be televised on NBA on TNT since 2018. Coming off the bench, Terence Davis scored 31 points against the Nets and referenced the victory beam during a post-game courtside interview, screaming "Light the beam! Light the beam! Woooooo! Yes, sir! Let's go, baby!" Following the game, Jason Anderson of The Sacramento Bee wrote that the beam "is quickly becoming a symbol of hope in Sacramento." As the beam gained popularity, Ranadivé stated "It's always been my vision to create a spectacle. That's what we did. This is that fireplace — we light the fire, and everyone can just gather around it." The Kings organization filed a trademark for "BEAMTEAM" on November 21.

The phrase became a popular chant amongst Kings fans and the team would continue to light the beam over the Golden 1 Center throughout the season. In December, Kings fans chanted the phrase during a road victory against the Los Angeles Clippers. The chants prompted Clippers forward Paul George to ask his teammate John Wall "what are they saying?" while the two were on the bench.

The Kings ultimately clinched a playoff spot on March 29, 2023, ending their drought. The team secured their playoff berth against Portland and despite being on the road, Kings fans were noted to chant the phrase at the Blazers' Moda Center. The Kings began the playoffs at home against the Golden State Warriors. After scoring 38 points and leading the Kings to a 126–123 win, De'Aaron Fox lit the beam to a home playoff crowd.

== Reception ==
The Boston Globe wrote that initially, "most brushed [the beam] off as a fun but silly idea from a struggling franchise, one that threatened to become a stick to beat them with when the Kings lost their first four games of the season." Ultimately however, Kings fans and the Sacramento community had an overwhelmingly positive response, with media outlets writing that the Kings' Beam Team helped inspire positive feelings within the city. Fans of the team listed the victory beam as a "place of worship" on Google Maps. A mural featuring the phrase was painted in Sacramento, as well. Fans began making merchandise and cocktails featuring the "Light the Beam" and "Beam Team" phrases. One Rocklin-based brewery was noted to craft a "Light the Beam"-dubbed IPA. NBA Twitter, the Twitter community of NBA fans, also received the beam positively, circulating memes relating to the beam.

NBA media writers wrote positively of the Kings and the beam during the season. Kurt Helin of NBC Sports commented "The long-struggling franchise [...] has come together this season around a couple of star players, a new coach, and a 'light the beam' idea that could feel gimmicky in some places but everyone has bought into in Sacramento, from the fans through the locker room." Highlighting Fox and Sabonis specifically for their play, Slam magazine writer Max Resetar stated:

"A singular purple light echoes up into the dark night sky. Unheard. Felt. Seen. The bright beam reverberates through all of Sacramento as a visual sign that the Kings have won again. The glow reveals. It's been accompanied by a surprising surge from the League's most dormant franchise."

Indeed, Fox and Sabonis were often written of as the figures engineering the success of the 2022–23 Kings team. Brown was also commended for his coaching efforts, en route to becoming the first unanimous Coach of the Year Award winner in NBA history. Brown also spoke positively of the beam, joking to reporters "we got to get a stronger beam", after the Kings won a daytime game.

Maya Miller of The Sacramento Bee wrote that "What made the beam so successful boils down to three things – a highly visible ritual, a chantable phrase, and a winning team." She added that, "sport marketing research shows that fans and spectators like to get physically involved with and be part of in-person experiences. The beam, while it lends itself well to viral photos and videos, also creates a special post-game moment for fans to experience together."
