= Lisa Bhathal Merage =

American businesswoman

- Born: United States
- Education: University of Southern California undergraduate
- Occupation: Businesswoman
- Known for: RAJ Sports, co-owner of Sacramento Kings, owner of Portland Thorns and Portland Fire, Revitate
- Spouse: Richard Merage

Lisa Bhathal Merage is an American business executive who invests in sports, real estate and commercial brands. Her RAJ Capital investment business' RAJ Sports division co-owns the NBA's Sacramento Kings, and owns the NWSL's Portland Thorns and the WNBA's Portland Fire, the latter having begun play in 2026. She is the controlling owner and NWSL governor for the Thorns. She also co-owns the Revitate investment platform, with her brother Alex.

== Early life and education ==
Bhathal Merage was born in California and attended Corona del Mar High School. She attended University of Southern California and joined her family's RAJ Swim swimwear business after graduating.

== Career ==
=== RAJ Manufacturing ===
In 2007, after assuming day-to-day responsibilities of RAJ Swim and its holding company RAJ Manufacturing, she and her brother Alex became co-presidents, and took over the company. In 2008, Bhathal Merage, then named Vogel, launched a line of swimwear called Luxe by Lisa Vogel.

=== RAJ Capital ===
RAJ Capital is the Bhathal family business, founded in 2007 by Bhathal Merage and her brother Alex. RAJ Capital was spun off from the family's RAJ Manufacturing swimwear business, which the siblings bought back from private equity, and is part of RAJ Capital. The firm focuses on investments in sports, real estate and consumer products.

=== RAJ Sports ===
RAJ Capital consolidated its investments in several sports teams into RAJ Sports. In January 2024, the group purchased the Portland Thorns of the National Women's Soccer League for $63 million. Bhathal Merage was named controlling owner and NWSL governor. In September 2024, the group was awarded an expansion franchise for a Portland WNBA team, to begin play in 2026. The franchise was later named the Portland Fire.

RAJ Sports also manages the family's stake in the NBA's Sacramento Kings. The family also has additional holdings in the AAA baseball club Sacramento River Cats, NBA-G League's Stockton Kings and the Kings Guard NBA 2K e-sports team.

=== Revitate ===
In 2021, the siblings launched Revitate, an extension of the RAJ Capital family business into an investment platform. Revitate focuses on sports, real estate and commercial brands. The platform is open to outside investors. As of 2023, Revitate was working on multifamily and industrial developments in secondary cities like Indianapolis; Charleston, South Carolina; and Albuquerque, New Mexico.

Revitate also operates the RevOZ platform, founded by Bhathal Merage and her brother Alex to invest in opportunity zones, a program created by the Tax Cuts and Jobs Act of 2017. An initial $125 million investment included apartment complexes in Sacramento, a healthcare center in San Bernardino, California, and an eco-friendly hotel in Redmond, Oregon.

== Philanthropy ==
Bhathal Merage sits on the board of the UC Irvine Langston Museum of Art, and co-chaired their opening gala. She also works with the Angels of the Arts support group for Segerstrom Center for the Arts in Costa Mesa, California.

== Personal life ==
As of 2024, Bhathal Merage was married to Richard Merage, a hedge fund investor and son of Paul Merage, the donor and namesake for UC Irvine's Paul Merage School of Business.

Sporting positions
Preceded by Paul Allen	Portland Fire principal owner 2026–present Served alongside: Alex Bhathal	Incumbent
