= Sacramento Kings =

National Basketball Association team in Sacramento, California

- 2026–27 Sacramento Kings season
- Conference: Western
- Division: Pacific
- Founded: 1923
- History: Rochester Seagrams; 1923–1942; Rochester Eber Seagrams; 1942–1943; Rochester Pros; 1943–1945; Rochester Royals; 1945–1948 (NBL); 1948–1957 (BAA/NBA); Cincinnati Royals; 1957–1972; Kansas City-Omaha Kings; 1972–1975; Kansas City Kings; 1975–1985; Sacramento Kings; 1985–present
- Arena: Golden 1 Center
- Location: Sacramento, California
- Team colors: Pure black, royal purple, gray, white, royal blue
- Main sponsor: Phoong Law
- President: John Rinehart
- General manager: Scott Perry
- Head coach: Doug Christie
- Ownership: Vivek Ranadivé
- Affiliation: Stockton Kings
- Championships: 2 NBL: 1 (1946); NBA: 1 (1951)
- Conference titles: 0
- Division titles: 6 (1949, 1952, 1979, 2002, 2003, 2023)
- Retired numbers: 11 (1, 2, 4, 6, 11, 12, 14, 16, 21, 27, 44)
- Website: nba.com/kings
Association	Icon	Statement
City

The Sacramento Kings are an American professional basketball team based in Sacramento, California. The Kings compete in the National Basketball Association (NBA) as a member of the Pacific Division of the Western Conference. The Kings are the oldest team in the NBA, and the first team in the major professional North American sports leagues located in Sacramento. The team plays its home games at Golden 1 Center.

The franchise began with the Rochester Seagrams (a semi-professional team) from Rochester, New York, that formed in 1923 and hosted a number of teams there over the next 20 years. They joined the National Basketball League in 1945 as the renamed Rochester Royals, winning that league's championship in their first season, 1945–46. In 1948 they jumped with three other NBL teams to the Basketball Association of America, that later merged with the NBL to form the NBA. As the Royals, the team was often successful on the court, winning the NBA championship in 1951. The team, however, found it increasingly difficult to turn a profit in the comparatively small market of Rochester and moved to Cincinnati in 1957, becoming the Cincinnati Royals.

Before the 1972–73 season, the team moved again, this time to Kansas City, Missouri, and renamed the Kansas City–Omaha Kings because it initially split its home games between Kansas City and Omaha, Nebraska; the nickname was changed to avoid confusion with the baseball team dubbed the Kansas City Royals. After three seasons, the team truncated to Kansas City Kings, but continued to play several home games per season in Omaha, through March 1978.

The franchise again failed to find success in its market and moved after the 1984–85 season to Sacramento. Their best seasons to date in the city were in the early 2000s, including a very successful 2001–02 season when they had the best record in the NBA at 61–21 (a winning percentage of .744). Between 2006 and 2022, the Kings had 16 consecutive losing seasons, the most in NBA history. The Kings also had the longest active postseason drought in the four major North American sports, which started in 2006 and lasted until 2023. Thanks to these periods of futility and their historic age (joining the Basketball Association of America (now NBA) in 1948 after previously competing in the National Basketball League in 1945), the franchise has the most losses in NBA history.

== History ==
=== 1923–1944: Rochester Seagrams ===
The basis of a purely-professional team in Rochester, New York, which came into existence in 1945, was two decades of a sponsored semi-professional team, the Rochester Seagrams. Canadian distiller Seagram was the team's main sponsor and received the bulk of what monies were made. During the 1932–33 season, the Seagrams actually played professionally in the District Basketball Association, while in the years 1933–36, they played in the District Basketball League instead, although official records for those particular seasons (never mind rosters for those specific teams) are not publicly available as of 2026. One of the team's early stars was Lester Harrison, a local high school star of some publicity before joining the team. Harrison later became the team's captain, coach, manager, and chief scout over the next two decades. Among visitors to Rochester to play the team were the Original Celtics, the New York Renaissance, and the Harlem Globetrotters.

=== 1945–1957: Rochester Royals ===
The logo of the Rochester Royals

With news that World War II was approaching its end, the National Basketball League (NBL) announced that it was expanding, and Harrison was approached for interest in a franchise. While the sponsored semi-professional team balked at additional expenses involved, Harrison and his brother Jack, a lawyer, jumped at the chance. They pooled money to meet the steep entry fee of $25,000 ($447,089 in 2025) and were granted an NBL franchise. Their team, the Rochester Royals, pushed the Seagrams out of their local facility, smallish Edgerton Park Arena.

The best players were the returning Navy and Army players now being released from the war. There was no draft for the league in the selection of new players. So, Harrison was able to scoop up several name stars for his new team, among them Bob Davies, Red Holzman and William "Fuzzy" Levane, as well as NBL free agents like George Glamack and Al Cervi. The result was a strong league champion in their first season of existence as the Royals during the 1945–46 season.

The team had two more seasons of success during their NBL years, which permitted the team to play non-league opponents. During all three years, 1945–1948, the team played over 300 total games, hosting most of them.

The Royals defected to the NBL's rival, the Basketball Association of America (BAA), in 1948 along with the Fort Wayne Pistons, Minneapolis Lakers, and Indianapolis (Kautskys) Jets. A year later, the BAA and the NBL merged to become the National Basketball Association (NBA).

After the move to the BAA, Rochester was placed in the Western Division. Their biggest rivals at the time were the Minneapolis Lakers, led by George Mikan, who won the NBA Championship five times between 1949 and 1954. The Royals were the only other team to win the NBA title during that period, defeating the New York Knicks 4–3 in 1951. It is the only NBA championship in the franchise's history.

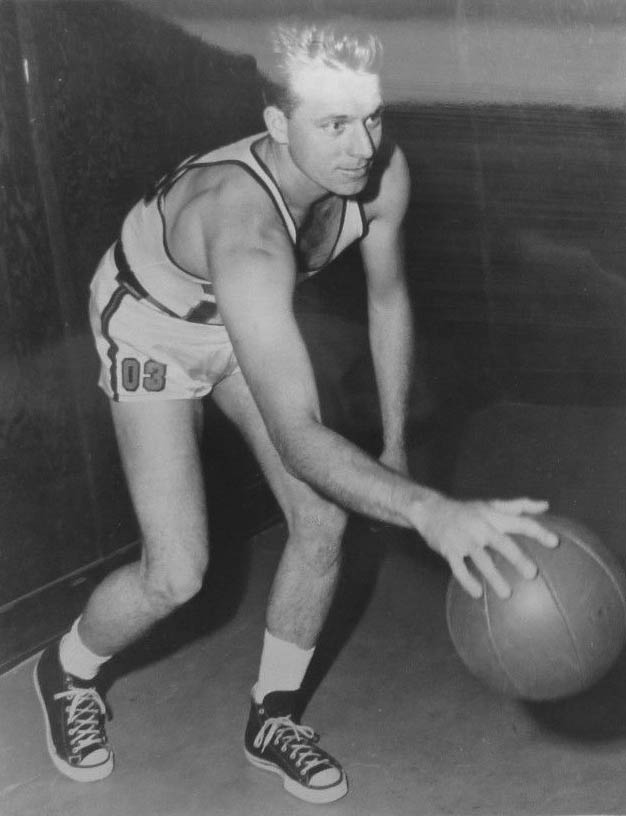
Red Holzman

The title, however, did not translate into profit for the Royals. With their relatively small arena and now-limited schedule, the franchise was losing money, despite the team finishing no lower than second in its division in both the NBL and BAA/NBA from 1945 to 1954. The roster turned over in 1955, except for star guard Bobby Wanzer, who soon became the team's new coach. The team moved to the larger Rochester War Memorial in 1955. The NBA even agreed to host their All-Star Game there in 1956. By then the Royals were in a rebuild and financial struggle and the NBA was putting pressure on Harrison to sell or move his team to a larger city, and eventually the owners announced that the 1956–57 season would be the Royals' last in Rochester.

The Royals' stay in Rochester featured nine future members of the Basketball Hall of Fame: Al Cervi, Bob Davies, Alex Hannum, Lester Harrison, Red Holzman, Arnie Risen, Maurice Stokes, Jack Twyman, Bobby Wanzer, while others proved prominent in other fields, such as Pro Football Hall of Fame member Otto Graham, Hollywood Walk of Famer Chuck Connors, and Jack McMahon.

=== 1957–1960: Early years of the Cincinnati Royals ===
In April 1957, the Harrison brothers moved the Royals to Cincinnati, a city that was then trying to obtain an NBA expansion franchise. This move followed a well-received regular-season game played at Cincinnati Gardens on February 1, 1957. The change of venue had been said to have been partly suggested by Jack Twyman and Dave Piontek, who were two of several roster players on the new Royals from that area. Cincinnati, which had a strong college basketball fanbase then, and no NFL franchise to compete with (until the Bengals joined in 1970 after two seasons in the AFL), was deemed the best choice for the Harrisons, who also considered other cities. The Royals name continued to fit in Cincinnati, often known as the "Queen City".

During the team's first NBA draft in Cincinnati, the team acquired Clyde Lovellette and guard George King. They teamed with the 1–2 punch of Maurice Stokes and Twyman to produce a budding contender in the team's first season in the Queen City. But injuries and the loss of star guard Si Green, the #1 overall pick of the 1956 NBA draft, to military service dropped the team into a tie for second place in the NBA Western Division during the 1957–58 season's second half.

In the season's finale, All-Pro star Maurice Stokes struck his head when he fell after pursuing a rebound. He shook off the effects of the fall, even as he had briefly been unconscious. After Game One in the playoffs three days later, Stokes's head injury was greatly aggravated by airplane cabin pressure during the flight back to Cincinnati for Game Two. He suffered a seizure and was permanently hospitalized, a tragedy that greatly shook the team. Stokes, a tremendous talent who could play center, forward and guard, was 2nd in the NBA in rebounds and 3rd in assists, a double feat only Wilt Chamberlain and Nikola Jokić have matched for a full season. The impact of losing Stokes was such that the team nearly folded. Six of the team's shaken players simply retired on the spot.

Fellow All-Star Twyman rose to All-Pro level over the next two seasons for Cincinnati, even as the team posted two 19-win seasons. The 1958–59 Cincinnati team featured five rookies, with Lovellette, King and other key players having left the team in the wake of Stokes' tragic injury. The Harrisons, wanting out at this point, sold to a makeshift local group, headed by Thomas Woods, Cincinnati Gardens management, and a number of local businessmen.

Jack Twyman came to the aid of his teammate, and even legally adopted Stokes. Raising funds for Stokes's medical treatment, Twyman helped him until his death in April 1970. The 1973 feature film Maurie, which co-starred actors Bernie Casey and Bo Svenson, dramatized their story.

Shooting often for the beleaguered team, Twyman was the second NBA player to ever average 30 points per game for an NBA season. Twyman and Stokes were later named Hall of Famers.

=== 1960–1970: The Oscar Robertson era ===
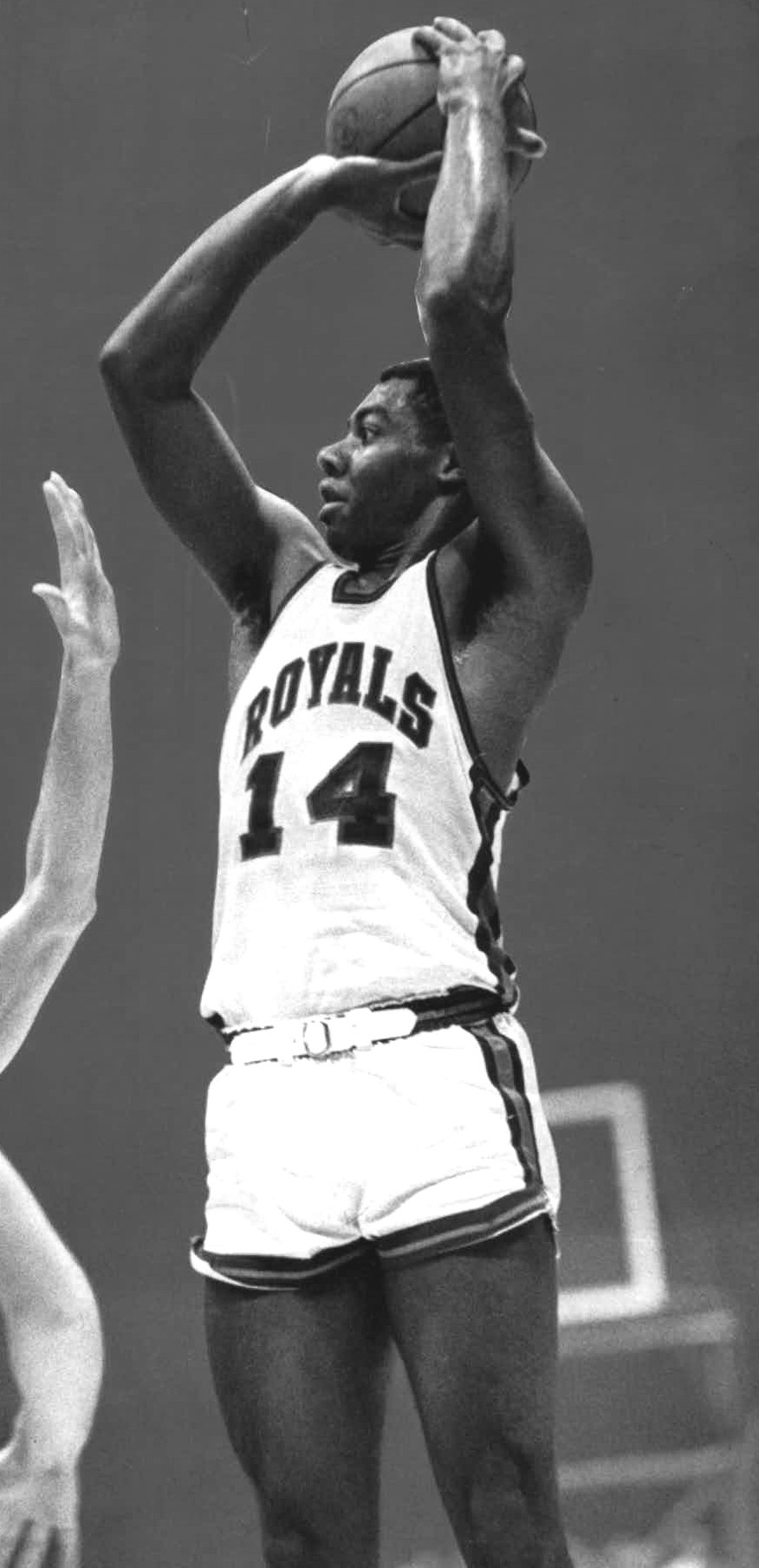
Robertson averaged over 30 points per game in six seasons and won six NBA assist titles while with the Royals.

In 1960, the team was able to land local superstar Oscar Robertson. Robertson led a team that included Twyman, Wayne Embry, Bob Boozer, Bucky Bockhorn, Tom Hawkins and Adrian Smith over the next three seasons. The Royals reversed their fortunes with Robertson and rose to title contender. An ownership dispute in early 1963 scuttled the team's playoff chances when new owner Louis Jacobs booked a circus for Cincinnati Gardens for the week of the playoff series versus the champion Boston Celtics. The Royals' home games were at Xavier University's Schmidt Field House.

In late 1963, another local superstar, Jerry Lucas, joined the team. The Royals rose to the second-best record in the NBA. From 1963 to 1966, the Royals contended strongly against Boston and the Philadelphia 76ers, but won no titles. In the 1964 NBA draft the Royals drafted rookies George Wilson, Bill Chmielewski, Steve Courtin (later traded to 76ers), and Happy Hairston. The team's star players throughout the 1960s were Oscar Robertson and Jerry Lucas. Robertson met with individual success, averaging a triple-double in 1961–62 and winning the Most Valuable Player award in 1964. Robertson was a league-leading scorer and passer each season. Lucas was Rookie of the Year in 1964, led the league in shooting, and later averaged 20 rebounds per game over four seasons. Both were All-NBA First Team selections multiple times. The team failed to keep some promising players, though, and played in the tough NBA East division, dominated by the Boston Celtics, even as a Baltimore team played in the West Division for three years, denying the team likely visits to the NBA Finals.

During the 1966–67 season, the Royals began playing some of their home games in neutral sites such as Cleveland (until the Cavaliers began play in 1970), Dayton and Columbus. This did wound their local fan base in Cincinnati, though, and fortunes for the team continued to steadily decline. That year, they would host the 1966 NBA All-Star Game, with Smith scoring 24 points to be named All-Star MVP. As of 2021, it is the last time that the franchise has hosted an All-Star Game. In the summer of 1968, Owner Louis Jacobs died and ownership went to his sons Jeremy and Max Jacobs.

New coach Bob Cousy traded Lucas in 1969. Robertson was traded to Milwaukee in 1970, where he immediately won an NBA title. Both transactions were unpopular with the fan base, resulting in a home attendance decline and eventually the franchise's move to Kansas City which was announced on March 14, 1972. The NBA Board of Governors voted 16–1 to permit the transfer nine days later on March 23. Before a crowd of 4,022, the Royals defeated the Baltimore Bullets 132–114 in its final home game at Cincinnati Gardens the following night on March 24. The team represented Cincinnati for one last time in a 135–122 win over the Cleveland Cavaliers witnessed by 10,289 at the Cleveland Arena two nights later on March 26.

=== 1972–1985: Kansas City–Omaha/Kansas City Kings ===
After moving to Kansas City, the Royals renamed themselves the Kings to avoid confusion with the Royals baseball team. Now dubbed the Kansas City–Omaha Kings, the team split its home games between the 7,316-seat Municipal Auditorium in Kansas City, Missouri and the 9,300-seat Omaha Civic Auditorium in Omaha, Nebraska.

The Cincinnati Royals had been looking at Omaha as a market as early as 1968, playing twelve "home games" in Nebraska from 1968 to 1971. From 1972 to 1975, the KC–Omaha Kings played a total of 42 regular season contests (but no playoff games) in Omaha. In 1975, the club became simply the Kansas City Kings (moving into the new 16,785-seat Kemper Arena the previous season). The team did not abandon Omaha completely, playing several games there through the 1977–78 season. For the next two seasons, they played several home games in St. Louis.

==== 1972–1976 ====
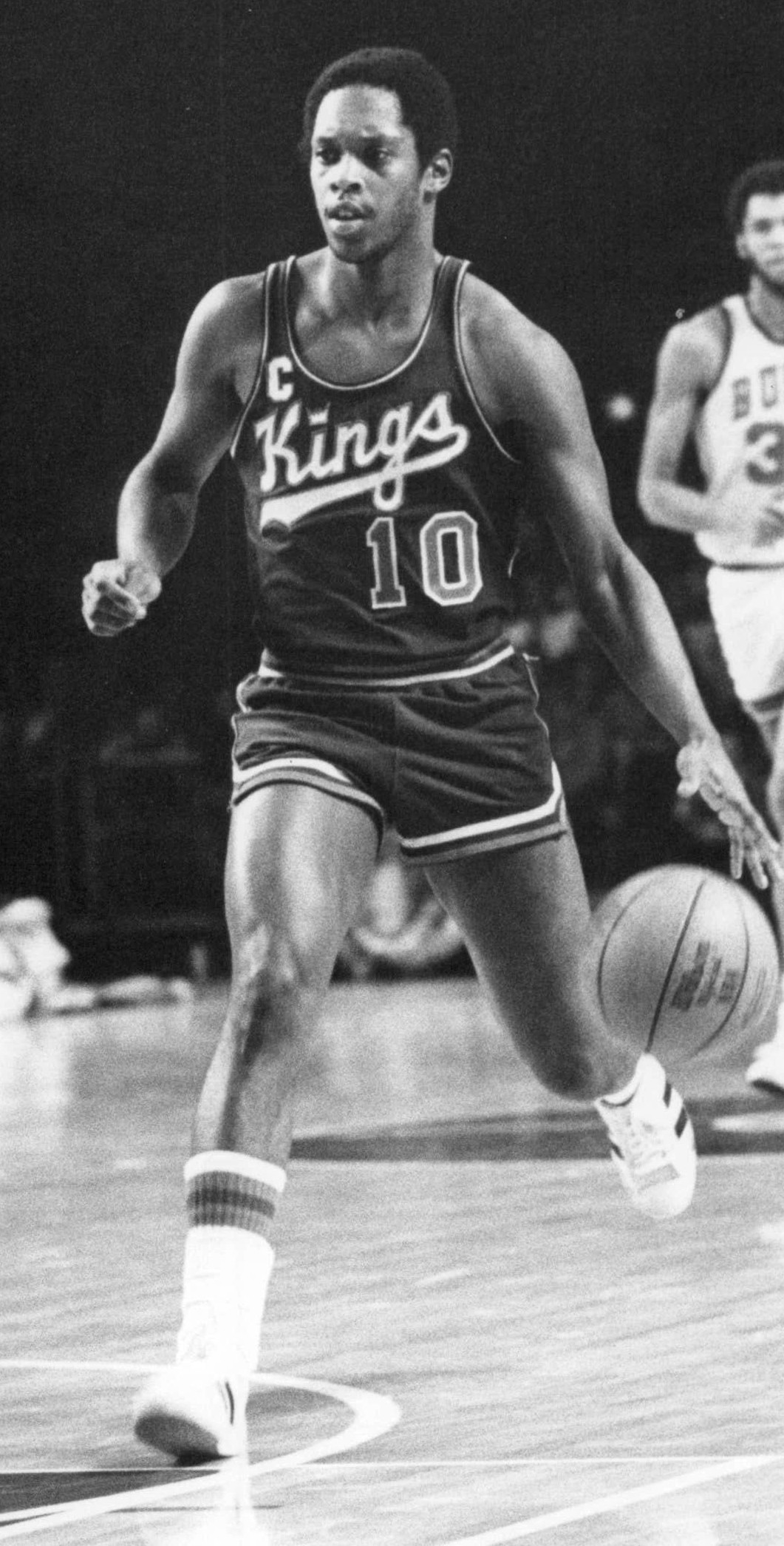
Nate Archibald led the NBA with 34.0 points and 11.4 assists per game in the 1972–73 season.

The team netted a new superstar in point guard Nate Archibald, who led the league in scoring and assists in the 1972–73 season.

While still in Cincinnati, the team introduced a most unusual uniform design, which placed the player's surname below his number. The design remained intact through the first several seasons of the team's run in Sacramento, even when the shade of blue on the road uniforms was changed from royal blue to powder blue, and the script '"Kansas City"' which adorned the road jerseys was scrubbed after the move in favor of a repeat of the "Kings" script on the home shirts. The Kings' back jersey template was later adopted by the WNBA and the NBA Development League, as well as the NBA during the All-Star Game since 2006.

The Kings had some decent players throughout. Tom Van Arsdale, the shooting forward, "Jumpin" Johnny Green, and Matt Guokas helped Archibald in the first year in Kansas City. Toby Kimball was a fan favorite. Jimmy Walker teamed with Archibald as the Kings made the playoffs the second year. Sam Lacey, an effective passing center, became one of the most dependable players in the league. Archibald became the first player to lead the league in scoring and assists in the first season in Kansas City. However, the management traded Archibald and wasted high draft picks. Bob Cousy gave way to Phil Johnson, who was fired midyear in 1977 and replaced by Larry Staverman, a player on the team on two separate occasions when it was in Cincinnati (Staverman coached for a brief time and then resigned in May 1981 to take up the role of team president's assistant for the Cleveland Browns).

==== 1976–1984 ====
The Kings finally achieved some success in their new home when they hired Cotton Fitzsimmons as coach. Fitzsimmons won the Midwest Division in 1978–79 with rookie point guard Phil Ford, who was NBA Rookie of the Year in 1979. Kansas City was led by shooting guard Otis Birdsong, strong on both offense and defense, all-around shooting forward Scott Wedman, and passing center Sam Lacey, who had a trademark 25-foot (7.6 m) bank shot. They drew an average of 10,789 fans to Kemper Arena that season, the only time during their tenure in KC that average attendance was in five figures (the attendance at the peak was only two-thirds of Kemper's capacity). The Kings later played several home games in St. Louis during the early 1980s to large crowds. Most Kansas City sports fans preferred to spend their entertainment dollar on the Royals, who won the American League West division championship four times in five seasons between 1976 and 1980, and reached the 1980 World Series.

The Kings made the playoffs in 1979–80 and again in 1980–81, despite finishing the 1980–81 regular season at 40–42 (.488). The Kings made a run in the 1981 NBA playoffs, reaching the Western Conference finals; these were the franchise's first playoff victories since 1964, and their only ones ever in Kansas City. Ernie Grunfeld played the point in this run in place of an injured Ford, as KC used a slow half-court game to win the first two rounds. Power forward Reggie King had a remarkable series, dominating the opposition. They then faced the Phoenix Suns in the Conference Semifinals and won three of the first four games before having to withstand consecutive victories by the Suns to force a Game 7 that saw them prevail 95–88 to become the first #5 seed to eliminate a #1 seed and also the second road team to win a Game 7 after leading 3–1. They then faced the Houston Rockets, also 40–42 in the regular season, but lost in five games in the Conference Finals. Lacey, the last remaining Cincinnati Royal to play for the Kings, could not keep up with Rockets superstar center Moses Malone. (The Kings did not win another playoff series for two decades.)

However, a series of bad luck incidents prevented the team from building on its success. Cleveland Cavaliers owner Ted Stepien lured Wedman and Birdsong away with big contract offers. In 1979, the roof fell in at Kemper Arena because of a severe storm, forcing the team to play most of the 1979–80 season at the much smaller Municipal Auditorium. Addtionally, general manager Joe Begzos was fired in a scandal in which he was found to be reusing marked postage stamps. When the Kings rehired Joe Axelson as general manager, they brought back the man who had previously traded Oscar Robertson, Norm Van Lier, Nate Archibald and Jerry Lucas, and used the third pick in the ABA dispersal draft on Ron Boone. Axelson stayed on after the Kings left Kansas City where, in their last game ever, fans wore Joe Axelson masks. Axelson later said he hoped his plane would never touch down in Kansas City.

Axelson became the first general manager in the history of sports to fail with the same franchise in four cities: Cincinnati, Kansas City, Omaha and Sacramento. He was not fired for good until he rehired coach Phil Johnson, whom he had fired in mid-season in Kansas City ten years before. The Kings also entered this period competing with the Kansas City Comets of the Major Indoor Soccer League (MISL) for the winter sports dollar, when the Comets were led by marketers—the Leiweke brothers. Their final season in 1984–85 resulted in a 31–51 (.378) record, as fans stayed away from Kemper Arena in droves, with average attendance of 6,410. Long-time ABA and NBA star, Don Buse, played his final professional season for the Kings.

Ownership began looking for a new home for the team, largely because of poor attendance and lack of sponsorship dollars. The team was third in sports market share by a significant margin behind the MLB's Royals and NFL's Chiefs, who went 14 consecutive seasons without a playoff berth during the Kings' stay in Kansas City. Also, Kansas City had a much stronger following for the Kansas Jayhawks, Kansas State Wildcats and Missouri Tigers college basketball teams than they did the NBA's Kings.

The franchise was sold for $10.5 million on June 8, 1983, to a six-man, Sacramento, California-based investment group led by Joseph Benvenuti who had a 50% interest and real estate developer Gregg Lukenbill who was the managing partner. The new ownership group honored the remaining two years of the Kings' lease with Kemper Arena which expired in June 1985 but also had a five-year option that eventually was never exercised. A $12-million conversion of an 82,000-square-foot warehouse into what would become the first ARCO Arena was announced on October 15, 1984. The transfer of the Kings to Sacramento was officially approved by NBA team owners on April 16, 1985, with the only contingency being the construction of an arena seating more than 16,000.

=== 1985–1991: Early years of the Sacramento Kings ===
The Kings moved to their current home of Sacramento, California in the 1985–86 NBA season, with their first Sacramento season ending in the first round of the Western Conference 1986 NBA playoffs. The starting lineup was Reggie Theus, LaSalle Thompson, Mark Olberding, Terry Tyler, and Mike Woodson, with Larry Drew, Eddie Johnson, Otis Thorpe, and Joe Kleine coming off the bench. However, despite fan loyalty the Kings saw little success in subsequent seasons, and the team did not make the playoffs again until the 1996 NBA playoffs in the 1995–96 NBA season. Some of their failure was attributable to misfortunes such as the career-altering car crash suffered by promising point guard Bobby Hurley in 1993, and the suicide of Ricky Berry during the 1989 off-season; some was attributed to poor management such as the long tenure of head coach Garry St. Jean and the selection of "Never Nervous" Pervis Ellison with the first overall pick in the 1989 NBA draft. Former Kings television broadcaster Jerry Reynolds (1987, 1988–90) and NBA legend Bill Russell (1987–88) were the earliest head coaches.

==== 1988–1989: Ricky Berry ====
Ricky Berry was selected by the Kings in the first round, 18th pick overall in the 1988 NBA draft. He had a dazzling rookie year in the 1988–89 season shooting 40.6 percent from the three-point range. The Kings also drafted Vinny Del Negro (selected by the Kings in the second round, 29th overall pick in the 1988 NBA draft) and acquired Rodney McCray from the Houston Rockets. In his first year with the Kings, McCray made 1988 NBA All-Defensive First Team. It was the first season the Kings would play without Reggie Theus and LaSalle Thompson (both part in the original team from Kansas City) or Joe Kleine (selected by the Kings as first round, sixth pick overall in the 1985 NBA draft). Thompson was drafted by the Kings in the first round, fifth overall pick in the 1982 NBA draft. It was also the last year that Michael Jackson (selected by the New York Knicks in the second round, 47th pick overall in the 1986 NBA draft but who played his entire career with the Kings) and Ed Pinckney (selected 10th overall by the Phoenix Suns in the 1985 NBA draft and played for the Kings from 1987 to 1989) played for the Kings. On February 23, 1989, Brad Lohaus and Danny Ainge were traded to the Kings from the Boston Celtics for Joe Kleine and Ed Pinckney. In June of the 1989 off-season, Lohaus was then acquired by the Minnesota Timberwolves in the 1989 NBA expansion draft. In August of the 1989 off-season, Berry was found dead from a self-inflicted gunshot wound at his home in Fair Oaks, California, at age 24 after an argument with his wife.

==== 1989–1990: Pervis Ellison ====
The 1989–90 season featured Pervis Ellison, who was first overall pick in the 1989 NBA draft by the Kings, and acquisition Wayman Tisdale (from the Indiana Pacers, second pick overall in the 1985 NBA draft). An injury kept Ellison on the sidelines for 48 of 82 games of his rookie year, after which he was traded to the Washington Bullets. Tisdale would go on to play for the Kings for five years. It was the last season that Danny Ainge, Kenny Smith (who had an impressive showing in the 1990 NBA Slam Dunk Contest), Rodney McCray, Harold Pressley (selected by the Kings in the first round, 17th overall pick in the 1986 NBA draft), Vinny Del Negro, Greg Kite, and Ralph Sampson played for the Kings. In 1990, Ainge was traded to the Portland Trail Blazers, Kenny Smith was traded to the Atlanta Hawks, and Rodney McCray was traded to the Dallas Mavericks.

==== 1990–1991: Lionel Simmons ====
Lionel Simmons—nicknamed L-Train—was drafted by the Kings in the 1990 NBA draft in the first round, 7th pick overall. In his first season, he made the NBA All-Rookie First Team. He would go on to play his entire career (1990–1997) with the Kings and had 5,833 career points. Antoine Carr (acquired from the Atlanta Hawks) played for the Kings in the 1990–91 NBA season and then was traded to the San Antonio Spurs. Free-agent Leon Wood, who would later become an NBA official, played for the Kings but was let go on Christmas Eve of 1990. Also notable that Bill Wennington was acquired from the Dallas Mavericks and played for the Kings for the 1990–91 season and after a successful career with the Chicago Bulls returned to the Kings for his final season in 1999–2000.

=== 1991–1998: The Mitch Richmond era ===
The early 1990s were difficult for the Kings. Sacramento was known for having strong fan support, and while they won over 60 percent of their home games, the team struggled on the road, going 1–40 on the road in a single season. Their play improved when they acquired Mitch Richmond, who previously played for the Golden State Warriors. While with the Kings, Richmond was selected as an All-Star six times while making the All-NBA Second Team three times. Garry St. Jean was chosen as new coach in 1992 and coached the team all the way through 1997, where he was replaced by Eddie Jordan.

During the 1990s, Sacramento had other stars like Spud Webb, Kurt Rambis, Wayman Tisdale, Walt Williams, Olden Polynice and Brian Grant, but they only lasted with the team for a few years. After the 1992–93 season, Rambis was traded to the Los Angeles Lakers. After the 1993–94 season, Tisdale was traded to the Phoenix Suns. After the 1994–95 season, Webb was traded to the Atlanta Hawks for Tyrone Corbin. Midway through the 1995–96 season, Williams was traded to the Miami Heat for Billy Owens (who was drafted by the Kings in 1991, and traded to Golden State for Richmond). After the 1996–97 season, Grant became a free agent and signed with the Portland Trail Blazers.

One accomplishment the team achieved under St. Jean during their tenures was a playoff appearance in 1996. The series was lost 3–1 to the Seattle SuperSonics who, led by Gary Payton and Shawn Kemp, finished as that year's conference champions. They did not make a playoff appearance again while Richmond was still on the Kings. He was soon traded along with Otis Thorpe to the Washington Wizards for Chris Webber in May 1998. Although Richmond was lost, this trade proved to be one of the keys to finally achieving playoff success after so many seasons of mediocrity.

=== 1998–2006: “The Greatest Show on Court" ===
The Kings drafted Jason Williams in the 1998 NBA draft, signed Vlade Divac, and traded for Chris Webber before the lockout-shortened season of 1998–99. These acquisitions coincided with the arrival of Peja Stojaković from PAOK BC (Greece), who had been drafted in 1996. Each of these moves was attributed to general manager Geoff Petrie, who has won the NBA Executive of the Year Award twice.

Led by new head coach Rick Adelman, and aided by former Princeton head coach Pete Carril, the Kings' Princeton offense impressed others for its quick style and strong ball movement. Some criticized the Kings for their poor team defense, Williams's "flash over substance" style with its many turnovers, and Webber's failure to step up in important match-ups. Still, they quickly garnered many fans outside of California, many of whom were drawn to the spectacular pairing of Williams and Webber. In 1998–99, they went 27–23, their first winning season in nearly twenty years and their first since moving to Sacramento. The new arrivals Webber, Williams, and Divac all played key roles in this resurgence; Divac ranked near the top of the team in most statistics, Webber led the league in rebounds and was named to the All-NBA Second Team, and Williams was named to the NBA All-Rookie First Team. In the playoffs, they were matched up against the defending Western Conference Champions, the Utah Jazz. After winning game 1 by 20 points, the Jazz surrendered two consecutive playoff games to the Kings. They would turn the series around, however, and win the last two to keep the Kings from advancing in the playoffs.

In 1999–2000, the Kings' only notable transaction was trading shooting guard Tariq Abdul-Wahad to the Orlando Magic in exchange for veteran shooting guard Nick Anderson. They finished eighth in the Western Conference with a 44–38 record and were matched up with the Los Angeles Lakers in the first round of the playoffs. Once again, however, the Kings failed to advance, losing the series 2–3 against the Lakers.

The following season, the Kings traded starting small forward Corliss Williamson to the Toronto Raptors for shooting guard Doug Christie, a move made to improve the subpar defense. They also drafted Turkish power forward Hedo Türkoğlu, further improving their bench rotation. Stojaković moved into the starting small forward role, where he and Webber proved to complement each other extremely well, and as the Kings continued to improve, their popularity steadily rose, culminating in a February 2001 Sports Illustrated cover story entitled "The Greatest Show on Court" with Williams, Christie, Stojaković, Webber, and Divac gracing the cover. That year, they went 55–27, their best in 40 years. In the playoffs, they won their first series in 20 years, defeating the Phoenix Suns three games to one, before being swept in the second round by the Lakers, who eventually won the NBA Championship.

In July 2001, Jason Williams was traded, along with Nick Anderson, to the Vancouver Grizzlies for Mike Bibby and Brent Price. Despite Williams's often spectacular play, the Kings had grown tired of his recklessness and turnovers; Bibby would provide much more stability and control at the point guard position. This move was complemented by the re-signing of Webber to a maximum-salary contract, securing their superstar long term. With Bibby taking over for Williams, they had their best season to date in 2001–02. Though not as exciting or flashy as they had been in previous years with Williams, the team became much more effective and disciplined with Bibby at the helm. They finished with a league-best record of 61–21, winning 36 of 41 at home. After easily winning their first two playoff matchups against the Stockton and Malone-led Jazz and the Dirk Nowitzki-led Dallas Mavericks, respectively, the Kings went on to play the archrival and two-time defending champion Los Angeles Lakers in the Western Conference Finals, regarded as one of the greatest playoff matchups in history. In a controversial series, the Kings lost in seven games, one game away from what would have been the first NBA Finals and a chance at the first professional sports championship in Sacramento history. This was a crushing blow to the Kings; after losing to their archrivals in a highly controversial series, the team would begin to decline and age in the years that followed. Many commentators and journalists would question the decisions made by the referees during game 6, specifically that the Lakers were awarded a staggering 27 free throws in the fourth quarter, many of which came from what were in retrospect proved to be no-calls. After Game 6, even print newspapers began to question the legitimacy of the game. The New York Post ran a front cover with a headline entitled "Foul Play"; it also published a related article suggesting that the game was rigged. NBA analyst David Aldridge (then working for ESPN) spoke on the game:

There is nothing I can say that will explain 27 free throws for the Lakers in the fourth quarter – an amount staggering in its volume and impact on the game. It gave me pause. How can you explain it? How can you explain a game where Scot Pollard fouls out when he's two feet from Shaquille O'Neal, or that Doug Christie is called for a ridiculous touch foul just as Chris Webber spikes Bryant's drive to the hoop, or that Mike Bibby is called for a foul deep in the fourth quarter after Bryant pops him in the nose with an elbow?

The 2002 Western Conference finals left many fans wondering whether the Kings could have gone on to win a title, and debate would continue for many years after the events of the series. Later, due to allegations raised by former NBA referee Tim Donaghy, the NBA set up a review of the league's officiating. Lawrence Pedowitz, who led the review, concluded that while game 6 featured poor officiating, there was no concrete evidence that the game had been fixed.

The Kings went 59–23 and won the division in the following season, seeking to avenge their playoff loss to the Lakers. After defeating the Stockton- and Malone-led Jazz in the first round and winning Game 1 against the Dirk Nowitzki-led Dallas Mavericks in the second round, the Kings appeared to be on the brink of another Western Conference Finals berth. However, Chris Webber sustained a major knee injury in game 2, and the Kings lost in a seven-game series. Webber's knee required major surgery. He returned mid-season in 2003–04, a season in which the Kings were seeking another chance to avenge their playoff loss to the Lakers, but without his quickness and athleticism, which had been the focal point of his style of play, it was not the same. The Kings still managed to defeat the Mavericks in the first round and after winning game 1 against the Kevin Garnett-led Minnesota Timberwolves in the second round, the Kings appeared to be on the brink of their second Western Conference Finals berth in three years, but the Kings ended the season with a defeat to the Timberwolves in a seven-game series.

==== 2004–2006: Decline ====
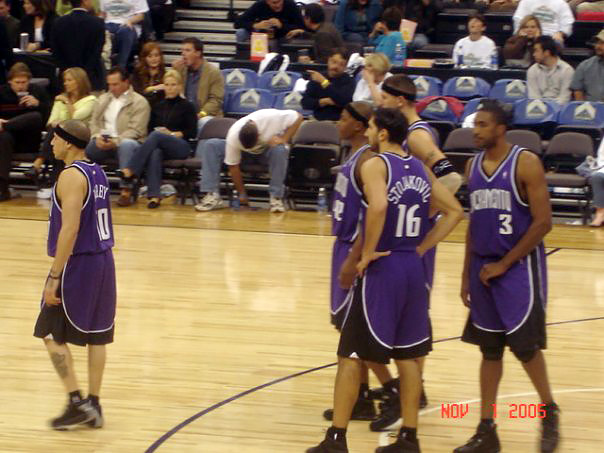
The Sacramento Kings in 2005

The 2004–05 season marked change for the Kings, who lost three starters from the famed 2002 team. In the off-season of 2004, Divac signed with the Lakers, which prompted the Kings to sign Brad Miller to start at center. Early in the season, Christie was traded to the Orlando Magic for Cuttino Mobley, and in February, Webber was traded to the Philadelphia 76ers for three forwards (Corliss Williamson, Kenny Thomas, and Brian Skinner). Thomas and Skinner failed in their attempt to replicate Webber's impact, and as a result the team's record suffered. The Kings lost in the first round of the playoffs to the Seattle SuperSonics. The 2005 off-season continued with changes, when they traded fan-favorite Bobby Jackson for Bonzi Wells and acquired free agent Shareef Abdur-Rahim.

The 2005–06 season started poorly since the Kings had a hard time establishing team chemistry. Newcomers Wells and Abdur-Rahim made major contributions early, but both were injured and missed a significant number of games. As the Kings' season continued, general manager Petrie decided to make a major move. Stojaković was traded for Ron Artest, a talented yet volatile forward known for his temper. Despite doubts that he would be able to replace the huge production of Stojaković, Artest and the Kings went 20–9 after the 2006 NBA All-Star break, the second best post-All-Star break record that season. Despite a winning record of 44–38, it was clear that they were not the same team of years past. The Kings were seeded 8th in the Western Conference playoffs and were matched up in the first round against the San Antonio Spurs. Though the Kings were surprisingly competitive, the Spurs eliminated them 4–2. This was the end of their era of competitiveness and started a 16-year playoff drought which continued until 2023. The 2006 off-season began with the disturbing news that head coach Rick Adelman's contract would not be renewed. The Kings named Eric Musselman as his replacement.

=== 2006–2009: Change and transition ===
In 2006–07, the disappointing play of the Kings was coupled with the distraction of legal troubles. Coach Eric Musselman pleaded no contest to DUI charges early in the season, while Artest got into trouble for neglect of his dogs, and was later accused of domestic assault. The Kings relieved Artest of basketball duties, pending investigation, then later reinstated him. They finished the season 33–49 (their worst in 9 years) which landed them in fifth place in the Pacific Division. They posted a losing record (20–21) at home for the first time since 1993–94. Their season included a seven-game losing streak that lasted from January 4 to 19. The Kings missed the 2007 NBA playoffs, the first time in eight seasons. Musselman was fired in April. The Kings' future appeared to rest on the shoulders of Kevin Martin, who was a lead candidate for 2007 NBA Most-Improved Player of the Year.

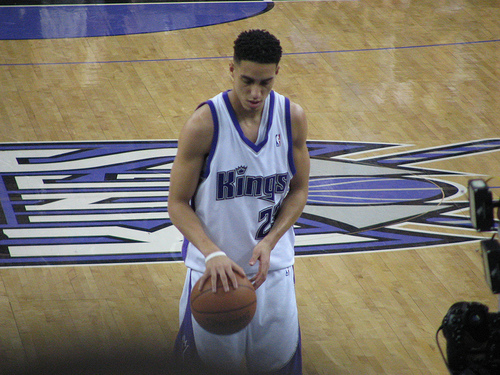
Kevin Martin shoots a free throw at a Kings home game.

The 2007 off-season was a time of change. Head coach Musselman was replaced by former Kings player, Reggie Theus. The Kings selected Spencer Hawes with the 10th overall pick in the 2007 NBA draft. In addition, they acquired Mikki Moore from the New Jersey Nets. Martin signed a contract worth $55 million, extending his period with the team for five more years. The Kings lost key players over the off-season, with backup Ronnie Price leaving for the Utah Jazz, and Corliss Williamson retiring.

They claimed fourth-year Beno Udrih off waivers from Minnesota. Udrih quickly assumed the starting position for an injured Bibby. It was announced in February that the Kings had traded Bibby to the Atlanta Hawks for Tyronn Lue, Anthony Johnson, Shelden Williams, Lorenzen Wright and a 2nd round draft pick. The move was presumably made to clear cap space. Bibby had been the last player from the Kings team that reached the Western Conference Finals in 2002.

The Kings improved by five games and finished the 2007–08 season 38–44 and missed the playoffs by a bigger margin (12 games) than the previous season (8 games). They went 26–15 at home and 12–29 on the road. After selling out every home game since 1999, the 2007–08 season sold out only three games at ARCO Arena with attendance averaging 13,500 fans per home game, almost 4,000 below capacity.

After a quiet 2008 off-season, it was confirmed on July 29, 2008, that the Kings would trade Artest and the rights to Patrick Ewing Jr. and Sean Singletary to the Houston Rockets in exchange for former King Bobby Jackson, Donté Greene, a future first-round draft pick, and cash considerations for Rashad McCants and center Calvin Booth.

Reggie Theus was fired in the middle of the 2008–09 season, giving way to Kenny Natt as the interim head coach. The Kings continued to struggle under Natt, ending up with the NBA's worst record for the 2008–09 season at 17–65. On April 23, 2009, Kings' Vice President Geoff Petrie announced the firing of Natt and his four assistants, Rex Kalamian, Jason Hamm, Randy Brown and Bubba Burrage.

=== 2009–2012: Arrival of Tyreke Evans and DeMarcus Cousins ===
Despite having the best odds to win the top overall pick in the 2009 NBA draft, the Kings obtained the 4th overall pick, the lowest they could possibly pick, to the outrage of many fans. Along with new head coach Paul Westphal, they selected Tyreke Evans. With the 23rd pick, they selected Omri Casspi from Israel.

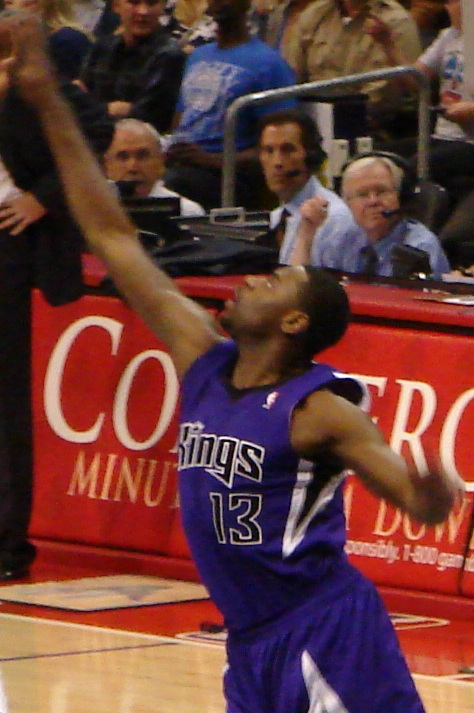
Tyreke Evans won the 2010 NBA Rookie of the Year award.

On April 27, 2010, Evans was the first Sacramento-era player to receive the NBA Rookie of the Year Award. Evans also became the fourth player in NBA history to average 20 points, 5 rebounds, and 5 assists per game as a rookie, joining Oscar Robertson, Michael Jordan, and LeBron James.

On June 24, 2010, the Kings selected DeMarcus Cousins with the 5th pick of the 2010 NBA draft. They also selected Hassan Whiteside with the 33rd pick of the 2010 NBA draft.

Despite the excellent play of Cousins and Evans, both of whom were front-runners in Rookie of the Year voting and received All-Rookie First Team honors, the Kings still ranked near the bottom of the NBA, going 25–57 in Evans' rookie year, and 24–58 in Cousins' rookie year. Much of this was due to the poor fit of the roster around Evans and Cousins, and the uninspired coaching of Westphal.

The 2010–11 season was marked with uncertainty towards the end of the season. Frustrated by the lack of progress towards an arena and dwindling profits from other businesses, the Maloofs sought immediately to move the franchise to Anaheim. The move seemed certain towards the end of the year, with Grant Napear and Jerry Reynolds emotionally signing off at the final home game vs. the Los Angeles Lakers. But after a vote by the NBA Board of Governors, the relocation effort was ended, to the glee of the fans.

In the 2011 NBA draft the Kings traded for the draft rights of Jimmer Fredette in a three-team deal with the Charlotte Bobcats and the Milwaukee Bucks, with the Kings receiving John Salmons sending Beno Udrih. This move was heavily panned by fans and media; by moving down in the draft and losing longtime starter Udrih for the unproductive Salmons, most found it difficult to find a bright spot in the deal. Westphal would shortly be fired, with Warriors assistant Keith Smart hired as his replacement. Around this time, the team took the slogan "Here we rise!" for its marketing campaign. Amid various relocation rumors and locker room tensions, the Kings had yet another unsuccessful season. One of their few bright spots was rookie Isaiah Thomas. Due to criticisms about his height (5'9" in shoes) and playmaking ability, Thomas slipped to the 60th and final pick of the draft. Despite this, and the presence of college superstar Fredette, Thomas earned the starting spot, finishing the season with averages of 11 points and 4 assists per game and earned a selection to the NBA All-Rookie team. In the 2012 NBA draft they selected Thomas Robinson out of Kansas.

Because of an unproductive rookie season by Robinson, he was traded with Francisco García and Tyler Honeycutt to the Houston Rockets in exchange for Patrick Patterson, Toney Douglas and Cole Aldrich.

=== 2013–2015: Franchise restructuring ===
On May 16, 2013, the Maloof family reached agreement to sell the Kings to a group led by Silicon Valley tech entrepreneur Vivek Ranadivé for a then-record NBA franchise valuation of $535 million. Ranadivé, 55, named Raj Bhathal, 71, founder of Tustin-based Raj Manufacturing, one of the largest swimwear companies in the nation, as one of the investors in a consortium to buy a majority stake in the Kings from the franchise's longtime owners, the Maloof family, for a reported $348 million. The group fought off a rival bid that would have moved the team to Seattle after the NBA's Board of Governors rejected investor Chris Hansen's bid to move the team. The new owners intend to keep the team in Sacramento. On May 28, the NBA Board of Governors unanimously approved the sale, ending several years of efforts by other cities to take possession and move the Kings out of Sacramento. On May 31, 2013, the Kings closed escrow, finalizing the sale to the Ranadivé group at a record valuation of $534 million, beginning a new era for the franchise. Plans were already underway to move forward on an arena, as the Downtown Plaza was reportedly being sold to the Sacramento ownership group. A month later, on July 30, Turner Construction was selected to be the builder of the arena.

Once the sale had closed and ownership was transferred to Ranadivé, the Kings began making changes to the management and staff. Geoff Petrie and Keith Smart were released; Michael Malone and Pete D'Alessandro were brought in to replace them. Corliss Williamson, Brendan Malone, Chris Jent, and Dee Brown were brought in as assistant coaches. On July 10, NBA executive Chris Granger was hired as team president. On September 23, 2013, Shaquille O'Neal purchased a minority share of the team, jokingly dubbing the team's new organization the "Shaqramento Kings".

These hires coincided with several roster moves. In the 2013 NBA draft on June 27, the Kings selected Kansas shooting guard Ben McLemore, who was widely projected to go top five, with the seventh overall pick. They also selected point guard and former McDonald's All-American Ray McCallum Jr. from the University of Detroit with the 36th pick. One week later, on July 5, the Kings sent former NBA Rookie of the Year Tyreke Evans to the New Orleans Pelicans in a three-team deal involving Robin Lopez, Greivis Vásquez, Jeff Withey, Terrel Harris, and picks. On July 9, the Kings traded a future second-round draft pick to the Bucks in exchange for defensive small forward Luc Richard Mbah a Moute, and on July 15, the Kings signed Carl Landry, who had played a stint with the team in its previous ownership, to a 4-year deal worth $28 million.

The 2013–14 season was widely anticipated by Kings fans. Playing their first game on October 30, against the Nuggets, the Kings won 90–88, despite being without projected starters Landry and Mbah a Moute. They were led by a 30-point, 14-rebound performance from DeMarcus Cousins, and a putback dunk by Jason Thompson with under a minute to play which sealed the victory for the Kings.

After the poor play of starting forwards John Salmons and Patrick Patterson through November, the Kings sought a change. On November 26, newly acquired Luc Richard Mbah a Moute was traded for power forward Derrick Williams. Nearly two weeks later, on December 8, they acquired Rudy Gay in a blockbuster seven-player deal that sent the struggling Patterson and Salmons to Toronto along with Chuck Hayes and off-season acquisition Greivis Vásquez. Quincy Acy and Aaron Gray were also sent to the Kings. The organization sought to add depth to their lineup during the 2014 off-season to complement the Kings' star duo DeMarcus Cousins and Rudy Gay. Sacramento added Darren Collison, Ryan Hollins and Ramon Sessions through free agency signings, as well as drafting Nik Stauskas before the 2014–15 season.

After an 11–13 start to the 2014–15 season, head coach Michael Malone was fired by the Sacramento Kings organization. Tyrone Corbin filled in for the Kings until Hall of Fame coach George Karl replaced him in February 2015.

On January 30, 2015, DeMarcus Cousins was named to replace the injured Kobe Bryant as a Western Conference All-Star in the 2015 NBA All-Star Game. Cousins' selection marked the first time a Kings player earned All-Star honors since Brad Miller and Peja Stojaković represented Sacramento in 2004.

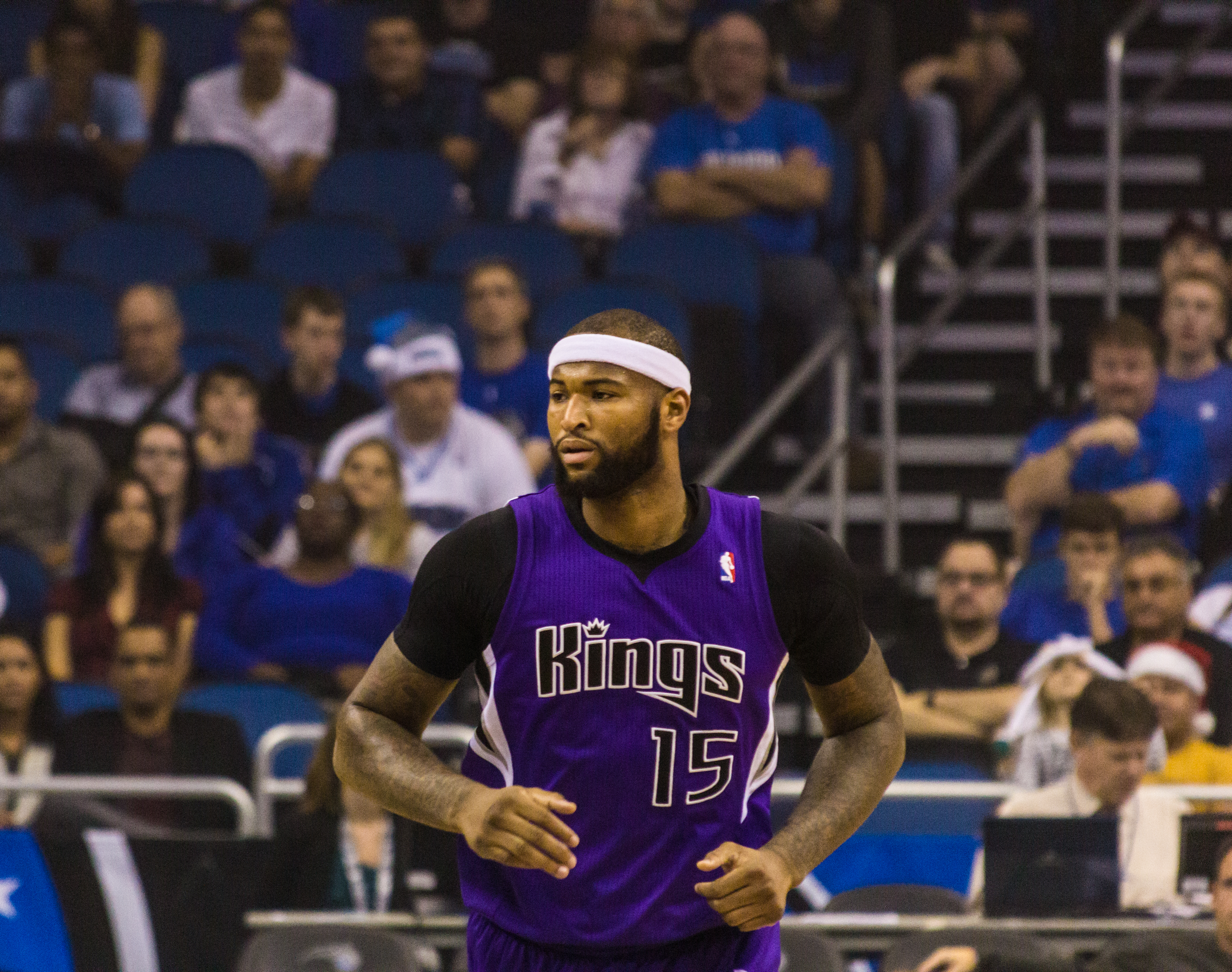
Demarcus Cousins in a game

=== 2015–2017: Rise of Cousins ===
On March 3, 2015, the Kings announced former Sacramento center Vlade Divac as the new vice president of basketball operations. Following the end of Sacramento's 29–53 season for 2014–15, The Kings made aggressive off-season moves in drafting Willie Cauley-Stein and acquiring Rajon Rondo, Kosta Koufos, Marco Belinelli, and Caron Butler in preparation for the 2015–16 season. To free up cap space, Divac traded Nik Stauskas, Carl Landry, Jason Thompson, a future top 10 protected first-round pick, and the right to swap two future first-round picks to the Philadelphia 76ers for the rights to second-round picks Artūras Gudaitis and Luka Mitrović. While the 76ers gave up nearly nothing to acquire draft assets that would result in the selection of number 1 overall pick Markelle Fultz, the Kings remained one of the worst teams in the NBA. It was regarded by many as one of the most lopsided trades in NBA history.

On April 14, 2016, after a 33–49 season, the Kings fired head coach George Karl. Karl compiled a record of 44–68 with the Kings.

The 2016–17 season brought several changes. The Kings moved into their new arena, Golden 1 Center. On May 9, 2016, the Kings hired former Memphis Grizzlies coach Dave Joerger as head coach. During the 2016 NBA draft, the Kings traded the 8th pick to the Phoenix Suns for the 13th and 28th pick in the draft, as well as the rights to Serbian guard Bogdan Bogdanović. Later in the evening, the Kings traded Marco Belinelli to the Charlotte Hornets in exchange for the 22nd pick in the draft. The Kings selected four players in the 2016 NBA draft—Greek center Georgios Papagiannis with the 13th pick, Syracuse shooting guard Malachi Richardson with the 22nd pick, Kentucky forward Skal Labissiere with the 28th pick, and Oklahoma guard Isaiah Cousins with the 59th pick. In free agency, the Kings signed Anthony Tolliver, Garrett Temple, Arron Afflalo, Matt Barnes, and Ty Lawson.

=== 2017–2022: Post-Cousins rebuild ===
On February 20, 2017, the Kings traded DeMarcus Cousins, alongside Omri Casspi to the New Orleans Pelicans for Tyreke Evans, Buddy Hield, Langston Galloway and two future draft picks. The Kings finished the 2016–17 season with a 32–50 record.

In the 2017 NBA draft the team selected Kentucky point guard De'Aaron Fox with the fifth pick. They also selected North Carolina forward Justin Jackson with the 15th pick, Duke center Harry Giles with the 20th pick, and Kansas point guard Frank Mason III with the 34th pick. With four rookie pickups, Divac wanted to add veteran presences on the roster. On July 10, 2017, the team signed three veterans—Vince Carter, Zach Randolph, and George Hill.

The team finished the 2017–18 season with a 27–55 record, placing 12th in the Western Conference. Giles sat out the entire season due to a leg injury despite previous reports that he would make his rookie debut in January. Hill was traded to the Cleveland Cavaliers. Greek center Papagiannis, who was selected in the first round of the 2016 draft, averaged only 2.1 points in the 16 games played.

During the 2018 NBA draft, the Kings selected Duke center Marvin Bagley III. The team was criticized after the draft for not selecting Luka Dončić, while Divac would go on to say he was confident in Bagley. Before the 2018–19 season, multiple analysts picked Sacramento to finish last in the Western Conference, calling their recent draft a "missed opportunity to build" and their lack of a veteran presence to offset their rookie lineup. The Kings lost to the Utah Jazz 123–117 in their season opener on October 17, 2018. Despite starting the season 1–3, including a loss to the Pelicans in which they gave up 149 points, the team would go onto win their next five games to hold a winning record. By December 30, the team held a 19–16 record. Ultimately, the Kings finished the season in ninth place in the Western Conference posting a record of 39–43; they again missed the playoffs. However, this was the team's best regular-season record since their last playoff appearance in the 2005–06 season. In spite of this, head coach Joerger was fired after the conclusion of the season, and Luke Walton was hired as his replacement three days later.

Earlier in the season, the Kings were rocked by the discovery that their former chief revenue officer, Jeff David, had embezzled $13.4 million in sponsorship payments from the Kings and their corporate partners over four years. David, who had taken a similar position with the Miami Heat, pleaded guilty to wire fraud and identity theft and was sentenced to seven years in federal prison.

After the suspension of the 2019–20 NBA season, the Kings were one of the 22 teams invited to the NBA Bubble to participate in the final 8 games of the regular season. However, Sacramento finished these games with a 3–5 record, missing the play-in game and extending their playoff drought for the 14th consecutive season.

==== 2020: Arrival of Monte McNair ====
On August 14, 2020, the Sacramento Kings announced that general manager Vlade Divac would resign from his position. Joe Dumars, a former player and executive for the Detroit Pistons, would be named interim Executive Vice President of Basketball Operations; Dumars had joined the Kings as a special advisor in June of the previous year.

After a month-long search, the Sacramento Kings announced on September 17, 2020, that Houston Rockets executive Monte McNair would be hired as the franchise's new general manager. With the Rockets, McNair spent thirteen years working under Daryl Morey, serving in various roles; he was most recently named assistant general manager in 2018. After this hire, interim executive Joe Dumars was named as the chief strategy officer of the organization. Other candidates for the position included Minnesota Timberwolves executive vice president Sachin Gupta, Denver Nuggets general manager Calvin Booth, and former Atlanta Hawks general manager Wes Wilcox. McNair announced three additional hires on October 14, 2020; these included the aforementioned Wes Wilcox who became an assistant GM, former Philadelphia 76ers scouting director Phil Jabour as vice president of player personnel, and Oklahoma City Blue executive Paul Johnson as director of basketball operations.

In July 2021, Dyal Capital, a unit of Blue Owl Capital, began to solidify a deal investing in the basketball team, giving the investment firm a 5 percent stake in the team with a valuation of $1.5 billion, though another person familiar with the matter placed the valuation closer to $1.8 billion.

In the 2021 NBA draft, in order to improve their defense the Kings selected Davion Mitchell from Baylor University with the ninth pick.

On November 22, 2021, head coach Luke Walton was fired after a mediocre 6–11 start; he was then replaced by Alvin Gentry on an interim basis. For the 16th season in a row, the Sacramento Kings failed to reach the Playoffs, and thus passing the Los Angeles Clippers for the longest playoff drought in NBA history, the Kings also made a blockbuster trade at the trade deadline with the Indiana Pacers sending Tyrese Haliburton for Domantas Sabonis. After the season, the Kings' fired Gentry as head coach.

=== 2022–2025: Fox and Sabonis era ===
On May 9, 2022, Golden State Warriors associate head coach Mike Brown was announced as the next head coach of the Kings. His tenure with the team began after the Warriors finished their 2021–22 season where they won the 2022 NBA championship. During the 2022–23 season, the Kings began lighting a large, purple beam into the night sky after every game won, inspiring chants of "Light the Beam" from the crowd at the end of victories at home.

Both De'Aaron Fox and Domantas Sabonis were named All-Stars and named to the All-NBA Third Team. On February 24, 2023, the Kings beat the host Los Angeles Clippers in double-overtime by the final score of 176–175. It was the second-highest scoring game in NBA history behind a December 13, 1983, affair in which the Detroit Pistons beat the Denver Nuggets 186–184 in triple-overtime. The game featured 44 combined three-pointers made, tied for the most in a game in NBA history and both teams shot over 58 percent from the field and over 80 percent free throws. It was also the first time in Kings franchise history in which two players scored at least 40 points in a game (Malik Monk scored a career-high 45, De'Aaron Fox had 42). On March 29, the Kings beat the Portland Trail Blazers 120–80 to clinch a playoff spot, breaking a 16-year playoff drought, which at the time was the longest active playoff drought in the four major North American sports. In the playoffs, they were defeated by the Golden State Warriors in seven games. Mike Brown was named NBA Coach Of The Year for his role in ending the playoff drought.

The next season, despite both Fox and Sabonis failing to return to the All-Star Team (though Sabonis was later named All-NBA Third Team and led the league in double doubles and triple doubles), the Kings finished 46–36. However, they finished only 9th in that year's strong Western Conference. The Kings made the play-in tournament for the year, beating the Warriors in their first game but later losing to the New Orleans Pelicans.

In the offseason, the team acquired 6-time All-Star DeMar DeRozan in a sign-and-trade deal. After a 13-18 start, the Kings fired Mike Brown just 18 months after he won Coach Of The Year. On 3 February 2025, the Kings completed a three-team trade, sending De'Aaron Fox to the Spurs while acquiring Zach LaVine from the Bulls. They also received Sidy Cissoko and a haul of draft picks, including a 2025 first-rounder from Charlotte, as well as Russell Westbrook from free agency the following season.

== Team logo, uniform and colors ==
=== Rochester Royals ===
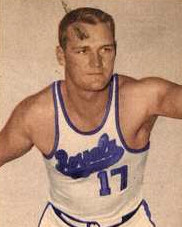
Arnie Johnson with the 1948–49 Rochester Royals

The initial Rochester Royals logo featured a blue and white shield with the word "ROCHESTER" on the top, with a white banner with the word "ROYALS" on it. From the beginning, the road uniforms were blue with the city name written in front, while home uniforms were white with the team name written in front. Red accents were added later in their Rochester tenure.

=== Cincinnati Royals ===
Logo used in Cincinnati

Upon moving to Cincinnati in 1957, the team logo became a basketball with a cartoon face. The basketball was depicted as wearing a crown with the city of Cincinnati within it. The word "CINCINNATI" was featured above the logo while the word "ROYALS" was below. The crown also had the team name on it. This logo was white with blue outlines. The uniforms remained blue on the road and white at home, again with red accents and the city/team name designation on the respective uniforms.

In the late 1960s, the Royals wore a uniform with the team name written vertically on the left side, with the number on the right. In 1971, the team adopted a red crown with a blue half-basketball below it. The word "CINCINNATI", in blue, was placed above the logo. The word "ROYALS", in white, was placed on the crown. The logo change also reflected on the uniforms, now featuring a script 'Royals' in front with red numbers. However, blue names and numbers at home, and white names and numbers on the road were written at the back of the uniform, with the unusual arrangement of the number above the name being used for the first time (normally, the player's name is shown above the back number).

=== Kansas City–Omaha/Kansas City Kings ===
For the 1972–73 season, the renamed and relocated Kansas City-Omaha Kings kept their uniforms and logos, with the exception of the name change. After settling in Kansas City for good in 1975, the Kings changed their road uniforms back to reading the city name in front. Beginning with the 1981–82 season, the road uniforms reverted to the team name in front, while numbers in front took on the same color schemes as the numbers in the back.

=== Sacramento Kings ===
After they moved from Kansas City in 1985, the Kings retained the color scheme of red, white and blue. The logo of a crown atop a bottom half of the basketball was also carried over. However, the shades of blue used on their home and road uniforms were different for five seasons. The home uniforms use royal blue, while the road uniforms use powder blue. The striping patterns were also different between the two uniforms, with the script "Kings" wordmark on the sides of the road shorts, and basic side stripes on the home uniforms. Carrying over from Kansas City was the unusual placement of player names at the bottom of the number at the front of the uniforms.

The uniforms changed slightly in 1990, with royal blue now used on the road; the shorts now incorporate the Kings logo, and the name and number on the back switched places to the standard positions of the name being on the top, then the player's number below it. The player names were now in a standard monotone serif font which was used by several NBA teams. This version would mark the last time the classic script "Kings" wordmark was used until 2005.

==== Change to purple and black ====
In 1994, the Kings radically changed their look, adopting a new color scheme of purple, silver, black and white. This unique color combination was first adopted by the MLB's Colorado Rockies in 1993, and would later be used by the NHL's Los Angeles Kings between 1998 and 2011. The uniform set consists of one wide side stripe running through the right leg of the shorts, with the primary Kings logo prominently featured. The home uniform is in white, while the road uniform is in black. From 1994 to 1997, a half-purple, half-black uniform, featuring checkerboard side panels, was used as an alternate uniform, which was panned by fans. However, the uniform was revived for the 2012–13 season during Hardwood Classics Nights. A new purple uniform, which shares the same template from the home and road uniforms, was introduced in the 1997–98 season.

Before the 2002–03 NBA season, the Kings changed their uniforms once again. This set included a modernized version of the "Kings" script on the home jersey, and the city name on the purple road jersey. The side stripes now run through the uniform. In the 2005–06 season they introduced a gold alternate uniform, featuring the classic script "Kings" wordmark. However, this alternate lasted only two seasons.

In 2008, the team introduced a new style of uniforms, with the names switching designations with a modernized "Kings" script on the road jersey in black text, and "Sacramento" on the home jersey still in white text. In doing this, the Kings became unique; most professional franchises place the team nickname on the home jerseys and the city name on the road jerseys. The numbers are black on both uniforms. The side panels were revamped, now only featured on the shorts and at the top half of the uniform. Before the 2011–12 season a black alternate uniform was introduced, sharing the same template as the home and road uniforms, but with the classic script "Kings" wordmark and silver numbers.

For the 2014–15 season, the Kings made a few tweaks to their home and away uniforms. While the team kept the 2008-era template, they brought back the 1994–2002 "Kings" script from the primary logo on both uniforms, along with purple (home) and white (away) numbers. The black alternate uniform was kept without any alterations. In addition, the crown logo at the back was replaced by the NBA logo, while a gold tab above it represents the franchise's 1951 NBA championship.

For the 2016–17 season, the Kings changed their brand by adopting a logo reminiscent of their 1971–1994 design and dispatched black from their logo while keeping the purple and silver. The Kings unveiled their new uniforms on June 15, 2016, featuring four designs. Both the home white and purple away uniforms feature a modernized "Kings" script, an updated crown on top, and gray side stripes. The so-called 'City' uniforms are similar to the away uniforms, except that the abbreviation "SAC" in gray appears in front. The black 'Global' uniforms substitute the crown for a standing lion crest on top, along with a solid gray side stripe on the right and the primary logo on the left leg. All uniforms feature a baby blue collar, stitches, and tab that says "Sacramento Proud", a nod to the franchise's first few seasons in Sacramento.

Beginning with the 2017–18 season, the jerseys will be sponsored by Blue Diamond Growers.

As part of the switch to Nike as the NBA's uniform provider, the home and away uniform designations were abolished. The Kings kept their uniforms mostly intact, but the erstwhile primary purple uniforms were retired in favor of the 'City' alternate purple uniforms. The Kings' primary uniform set now consists of the white 'Association' uniforms, the purple 'Icon' uniforms and the black 'Statement' uniforms.

The Kings announced an updated uniform set ahead of the 2023–24 season. The most notable change was that black became the primary color and purple relegated to accent color, along with a new "Kings" script heavily inspired by the team's uniforms from 1972 to 1994. The white "Association" uniform featured black letters and purple trim, along with purple, black and silver side stripes. The black "Icon" uniform featured white letters and purple trim, along with purple and silver side stripes. The "Statement" uniform drew inspiration from the alternate uniforms worn from 1994 to 1997, largely featuring purple with a black gradient along with purple and black checkerboard patterns on each side. The full team name, using the modern team wordmark, is emblazoned in front.

==== City special edition uniforms ====
Nike also released a special edition 'City' uniform that pays tribute to both local culture and team heritage. Sacramento's 2017–18 'City' uniforms feature a white and powder blue base with red trim, echoing the road uniform colors the team wore from 1985 to 1990. A recolored lion head logo in red and gray is also emblazoned in front.

For the 2018–19 season, the Kings tweaked the 'City' uniforms, replacing the lion-head logo with the wordmark "Sactown". The same uniform design was carried over for the 2019–20 season, but with red as the base color and powder blue as the trim color.

The "Sactown" theme was retained for the 2020–21 "City" uniform, but with four design cues taken from earlier uniforms. The black base paid homage to the 1994–2002 black uniforms. The checkerboard patterns were taken from their 1994–1997 purple/black alternate uniforms. The powder blue and red trim of the 1985–1990 road uniforms and of previous "City" uniforms were carried over to this design. The Kings reused this "City" uniform in the 2026–27 season.

The 2021–22 "City" uniform featured references of the Kings' previous uniform designs. The "Sactown" script and off-centered number arrangement paid homage to the Kings uniforms from 1971 to 1994. The black base and purple trim honored the 1994–2002 uniforms, and a modified version of the Rochester Royals' logo on the waist was a tribute to the original incarnation of the franchise.

The 2022–23 "City" uniform featured a gray base and purple trim, and was inspired by the team's near-move in 2012 and eventual sale to Vivek Ranadivé. The gray base was taken from exterior of the team's current home, Golden 1 Center.

The 2023–24 "City" uniform was heavily inspired by the Cincinnati Royals uniforms worn in the late 1960s, featuring a vertically arranged "Kings" wordmark in a white stripe, red borders, silver sleeve stripes, and blue base. The uniform commemorated the centennial anniversary of the franchise, dating back to its early years as the Rochester Seagrams. The Cincinnati theme was revisited in the 2024–25 "City" uniform, with the "Kings" block lettering based on the team's warmup jackets in the late 1960s.

The 2025–26 "City" uniform was a remix of their 2022–23 "City" uniform, this time featuring a deep ink purple base and bright violet accents; this honored the now-iconic "Light the Beam" celebrations after home victories which started in that season.

==== Classic uniforms ====
During the 2002–03 season, the Kings brought back the 1960s Cincinnati Royals white uniform for a few games as a tribute to Oscar Robertson. The following season, they wore the mid-1970s Kansas City Kings white uniform for select games to honor Nate Archibald.

The Kings' mid-1980s powder blue jerseys were first brought back in the 2004–05 season to celebrate the franchise's 20th season in Sacramento. They would return in 2015–16 for the team's final season at Sleep Train Arena, and the next season upon moving to Golden 1 Center.

During the 2010–11 season, the Kings honored the 1950–51 Rochester Royals championship team by wearing throwback uniforms from that era. The team also wore blue versions of the Rochester throwbacks in the 2014–15 season.

For the 2019–20 season, the Kings brought back their blue uniforms worn from 1990 to 1994 in commemoration of the franchise's 35th season in Sacramento.

Ahead of the 2024–25 season, the Kings unveiled their classic uniform as part of the team's 40th season in Sacramento. The style was based on the 2002 to 2008 purple uniform.

== Mascot ==
Since the 1997–98 season, the official Kings mascot has been Slamson the Lion, which replaced "The Gorilla."

== Season-by-season record ==
List of the last five seasons completed by the Kings. For the full season-by-season history, see List of Sacramento Kings seasons.

Note: GP = Games played, W = Wins, L = Losses, W–L% = Winning percentage

Season	GP	W	L	W–L%	Finish	Playoffs
2021–22	82	30	52	.366	5th, Pacific	Did not qualify
2022–23	82	48	34	.585	1st, Pacific	Lost in first round, 3–4 (Warriors)
2023–24	82	46	36	.561	4th, Pacific	Did not qualify
2024–25	82	40	42	.488	4th, Pacific	Did not qualify
2025–26	82	22	60	.268	5th, Pacific	Did not qualify

== Home arenas ==
- Edgerton Park Arena (1949–1954)
- Rochester War Memorial (1955–1957)
- Cincinnati Gardens (1957–1972)
- Omaha Civic Auditorium (1972–1978)
- Kansas City Municipal Auditorium (1972–1974 & 1979–1980)
- Kemper Arena (1974–1985)
- ARCO Arena I (1985–1988)
- ARCO Arena II (1988–2016)
- Golden 1 Center (2016–present)

== Rivalries ==
Before moving to Ohio, the Royals' biggest rival was the Syracuse Nationals, which went on to become the Philadelphia 76ers. This left upstate New York without a team until the Buffalo Braves were established in 1970. This third attempt did not last, with the Braves moving to San Diego, California in 1978 to become the San Diego Clippers.

In 1970, the Cleveland Cavaliers were established. This brought a new rival for the Royals, as well as a new team in Ohio. This rivalry did not last, and the Royals moved to Kansas City only a few years later. Although the NBA previously had a team in St. Louis, Missouri in the form of the St. Louis Hawks, that team moved to Atlanta in 1968, thus preventing a potential new rivalry for the Kings. This made the Kings the first team in the state in four years. 13 years later, the Kings moved to California, leaving Missouri without a team.

=== Los Angeles Lakers ===
The Kings and the Lakers have faced each other in the playoffs nine times between 1949 and 2002, and since the Kings moved to Sacramento in 1985, both have been based in California. The 2002 Western Conference Finals was one of the most bitterly contested in NBA history, with many controversial calls in game 6. The Lakers would win the series in game 7.

=== Golden State Warriors ===
Since the Kings moved to Sacramento in 1985, they have had a geographic rivalry with the Golden State Warriors: Sacramento and San Francisco sit 86 miles apart in Northern California. The two teams first met in the playoffs in 2023, where they faced off in the first round. In a bitterly fought series, including a rough play between Domantas Sabonis and Draymond Green in game 2 where Green stomped roughly on Sabonis's chest, resulting in Green being suspended in game 3, and several violent viral fan scuffles throughout the series (as opposing fans were widespread at both Chase Center and Golden 1 Center due to the geographic proximity), the Warriors defeated the Kings in seven games to advance to the semifinals. The series drew the highest first- and second-round playoff TV ratings for the NBA since 1999, with game 7 peaking at 11.9 million viewers on ABC.

== Personnel ==
=== Current roster ===
Sacramento Kings roster
Players

Pos.	No.	Player	Height	Weight	DOB	From
G	5	Darius Acuff Jr.	6 ft 2 in (1.88 m)	190 lb (86 kg)	2006-11-16	Arkansas
F	9	Precious Achiuwa	6 ft 8 in (2.03 m)	243 lb (110 kg)	1999-09-19	Nigeria
F	19	Leaky Black (TW)	6 ft 7 in (2.01 m)	209 lb (95 kg)	1999-06-14	North Carolina
C	32	Dylan Cardwell	6 ft 10 in (2.08 m)	255 lb (116 kg)	2001-12-16	Auburn
G/F	15	De'Andre Hunter	6 ft 7 in (2.01 m)	221 lb (100 kg)	1997-12-02	Virginia
F	33	Alex Karaban	6 ft 7 in (2.01 m)	220 lb (100 kg)	2002-11-11	Connecticut
G	8	Zach LaVine	6 ft 5 in (1.96 m)	200 lb (91 kg)	1995-03-10	UCLA
F	22	Jonathan Mogbo (TW)	6 ft 7 in (2.01 m)	225 lb (102 kg)	2001-10-29	San Francisco
G	0	Malik Monk	6 ft 3 in (1.91 m)	200 lb (91 kg)	1998-02-04	Kentucky
F	13	Keegan Murray	6 ft 8 in (2.03 m)	225 lb (102 kg)	2000-08-19	Iowa
G	3	Sean Pedulla (TW)	6 ft 1 in (1.85 m)	197 lb (89 kg)	2002-10-10	Mississippi
G/F	29	Daeqwon Plowden	6 ft 4 in (1.93 m)	216 lb (98 kg)	1998-08-29	Bowling Green
C	24	Mason Plumlee	7 ft 0 in (2.13 m)	254 lb (115 kg)	1990-03-05	Duke
C	42	Maxime Raynaud (injured)	7 ft 1 in (2.16 m)	268 lb (122 kg)	2003-04-07	Stanford
F/C	11	Domantas Sabonis	6 ft 10 in (2.08 m)	240 lb (109 kg)	1996-05-03	Gonzaga
G	34	Emanuel Sharp	6 ft 3 in (1.91 m)	212 lb (96 kg)	2004-03-07	Houston
G/F	25	Ben Simmons (injured)	6 ft 9 in (2.06 m)	245 lb (111 kg)	1996-07-20	LSU

Coaches
Head coach
- Doug Christie
Assistant(s)
- Mike Woodson (Associate HC)
- Leandro Barbosa
- Bobby Jackson
- Mike Miller
- Chris Darnell

Legend
- (DP) Unsigned draft pick
- (FA) Free agent
- (S) Suspended
- (GL) On assignment to G League affiliate
- (TW) Two-way affiliate player
- Injured

Roster
Updated: July 27, 2026

=== Retained draft rights ===
Occasionally, the Kings hold the draft rights to the unsigned draft picks who have been playing outside the NBA. A drafted player, either an international draftee or a college draftee who is not signed by the team that drafted him, is allowed to sign with any non-NBA teams. In this case, the team retains the player's draft rights in the NBA until one year after the player's contract with the non-NBA team ends. This list includes draft rights that were acquired from trades with other teams.

Draft	Round	Pick	Player	Pos.	Nationality	Current team	Note(s)	Ref

=== Retired numbers ===
All of the Kings retired numbers are hanging in the rafters of Golden 1 Center.

Sacramento Kings retired numbers
No.	Player	Position	Tenure	Retired
1	Nate Archibald	G	1970–1976	February 6, 2004
2	Mitch Richmond	G	1991–1998	December 5, 2003
4	Chris Webber	F	1998–2005	February 6, 2009
6	Fans ("The Sixth Man")	—	1985–present	1986–87
11	Bob Davies	G	1945–1955	1989–90^{1}
12	Maurice Stokes	F	1955–1958	
14	Oscar Robertson	G	1960–1970	February 16, 2003
16	Peja Stojaković	F	1998–2006	December 16, 2014
21	Vlade Divac	C	1999–2004	March 31, 2009
27	Jack Twyman	F	1955–1966	March 5, 1966
44	Sam Lacey	C	1970–1981	

- ^{1} Number was temporarily unretired for Domantas Sabonis since 2024.
- The NBA retired Bill Russell's No. 6 for all its member teams on August 11, 2022.

=== Naismith Basketball Hall of Famers ===
Sacramento Kings Hall of Famers
Players
No.	Name	Position	Tenure	Inducted	No.	Name	Position	Tenure	Inducted
11	Bob Davies	G	1945–1955	1970	19	Bob Cousy^{1}	G	1969–1970	1971
14	Oscar Robertson ^{2}	G	1960–1970	1980	16	Jerry Lucas ^{3}	F/C	1963–1969	1980
10; 27; 31	Jack Twyman	F	1955–1966	1983	9; 09	Bobby Wanzer	G	1948–1957	1987
34	Clyde Lovellette	C/F	1957–1958	1988	1; 10	Nate Archibald	G	1970–1976	1991
14	Arnie Risen	C	1948–1955	1998	12	Maurice Stokes	F	1955–1958	2004
50	Ralph Sampson	C	1989–1991	2012	5	Guy Rodgers	G	1967–1968	2014
2	Mitch Richmond	G	1991–1998	2014	13	Šarūnas Marčiulionis	G	1995–1996	2014
12	Jo Jo White	G	1980–1981	2015	21	Vlade Divac	C	1998–2004	2019
4	Chris Webber	F	1998–2005	2021	15	Vince Carter	G/F	2017–2018	2024
Coaches
Name		Position	Tenure	Inducted	Name		Position	Tenure	Inducted
Pete Carril		Assistant coach	1996–2006; 2008–2012	1997	5	Rick Adelman ^{5}	Head coach	1998–2006	2021
Bill Russell ^{6}		Head coach	1987–1988	2021	George Karl		Head coach	2015–2016	2022
Contributors
Name		Position	Tenure	Inducted	Name		Position	Tenure	Inducted
Les Harrison		Head coach Owner	1948–1955	1980	15; 32; 34	Wayne Embry ^{4}	C	1958–1966	1999
Cotton Fitzsimmons		Head coach	1978–1984	2021					

Notes:

- ^{1} He also coached the team in 1969–1973.
- ^{2} In total, Robertson was inducted into the Hall of Fame twice—as a player and as a member of the 1960 Olympic team.
- ^{3} In total, Lucas was inducted into the Hall of Fame twice—as a player and as a member of the 1960 Olympic team.
- ^{4} Inducted as contributor for being the first African American to manage a team in the NBA. He also played for the team in 1958–1966.
- ^{5} Also played for the team (1975).
- ^{6} In total, Russell was inducted into the Hall of Fame twice—as a player and as coach.

=== FIBA Hall of Famers ===
Sacramento Kings Hall of Famers
Players
No.	Name	Position	Tenure	Inducted
14	Oscar Robertson	G	1960–1970	2009
21	Vlade Divac	C	1999–2004	2010
13	Šarūnas Marčiulionis	G	1995–1996	2015
16	Peja Stojaković	F	1998–2006	2024
5	Hedo Türkoğlu	F	2000–2003	2026

== See also ==
- Pete Carril
- Scott Moak

Preceded by Fort Wayne Zollner Pistons	NBL champions 1945–46	Succeeded by Chicago American Gears
Preceded by Minneapolis Lakers	NBA champions 1950–51	Succeeded by Minneapolis Lakers
