= 1945–46 Youngstown Bears season =

NBL professional basketball team season

- Head coach: Paul Birch (player-coach)
- General manager: William Cunningham
- Arena: Youngstown South Field House

Results
- Record: 13–20 (.394)
- Place: Division: 3rd (Eastern)
- Playoff finish: Did not qualify

The 1945–46 Youngstown Bears season was technically the first professional basketball season of play for the Youngstown Bears in the smaller city of Youngstown, Ohio under the National Basketball League, which officially was the ninth season that it existed as a professional basketball league after previously existing as a semi-pro or amateur basketball league called the Midwest Basketball Conference in its first two seasons back in 1935. However, according to some older material that covered the NBL's history, the Youngstown Bears franchise are considered to be an extension of the Pittsburgh Raiders franchise, which originally started out as the independently created Pittsburgh Y.M.H.A. team back when they were an amateur team from the Pittsburgh Young Men's Hebrew Association all the way back in 1931 before joining the Midwest Basketball Conference precursor in 1935 before the team rebranded themselves into the Pittsburgh Pirates NBL team honoring the Major League Baseball team of the same name that joined the rebranded NBL in 1937 before they first left it in 1939 before supposedly reforming themselves independently as the Raiders in 1943 before returning to the NBL in 1944 before having the Youngstown Bears team replace the Pittsburgh Raiders team due to local fans in Youngstown looking to have the Raiders play in Youngstown instead (though the Raiders would still later exist as an independent team instead). As such, if one were to include the wild Pittsburgh Y.M.H.A./Pirates/Raiders team history as a part of the Youngstown Bears' newly established history, this would officially be (at least) their tenth season of play as a franchise instead of their very first season of play as a franchise.

Throughout their first season in Youngstown, the Bears would see significant struggles and issues plague their entire season, including the worst blowout loss in NBL history on January 5, 1946, in a 70–27 beatdown to the eventual NBL champion Rochester Royals where Youngstown only made eleven total baskets and five total free-throws that night (with the best scorer for the Bears being Frank Baumholtz with 8 total points scored when Rochester had five different players either match or surpass Baumholtz's high score for that night, including George Glamack scoring 17 points by himself). Despite the poor play they had that season, they would still finish their division with a third-place finish through a 13–20, which would place them ahead of the Cleveland Allmen Transfers (who folded operations by the season's end), but wouldn't come anywhere close to a playoff spot this season. However, their biggest loss would come from within after the season's end, as despite originally being invited to the 1946 version of the World Professional Basketball Tournament, a young, rising star center of theirs named Huck Hartman not only ended up getting severely sick (which caused the Bears to withdraw from their initial entry into the WPBT for the 1946 year and have their spot in the event be replaced by the formerly defunct Toledo White Huts, who sometimes had get referred to as the Toledo Whites during this specific event and later went on to become the Toledo Jeeps), but also later died from pneumonia on March 25, 1946 (during the 1946 World Professional Basketball Tournament) following the team's final (NBL) game played that season against the Chicago American Gears. In spite of the death of one of their key players, the Youngstown Bears would continue to remain active in the NBL for another season after this one.

== Roster ==
Please note that due to the way records for professional basketball leagues like the NBL and the ABL were recorded at the time, some information on both teams and players may be harder to list out than usual here.

1945–46 Youngstown Bears roster
Players

Pos.	No.	Player	Height	Weight	DOB	From
G/F		Bob Armstrong	6 ft 1 in (1.85 m)	180 lb (82 kg)	1920–06–11	Glenville State
C		Carl Baer	6 ft 6 in (1.98 m)	200 lb (91 kg)	1918–02–26	Aliquippa HS (PA)
G		Frank Baumholtz	5 ft 10 in (1.78 m)	170 lb (77 kg)	1918–10–07	Ohio
G/F	5	Moe Becker	6 ft 1 in (1.85 m)	185 lb (84 kg)	1920–12–29	Duquesne
C		Ray Bellingham	6 ft 8 in (2.03 m)	200 lb (91 kg)	1916–10–29	Westminster (PA)
G	6	Paul Birch	6 ft 1 in (1.85 m)	190 lb (86 kg)	1910–01–10	Duquesne
F/C	7	Irv Brenner	6 ft 4 in (1.93 m)	200 lb (91 kg)	1913–05–31	Duquesne
G	1	Rudy Debnar	5 ft 11 in (1.80 m)	160 lb (73 kg)	1916–05–09	Duquesne
C		Ernie Fortney	6 ft 4 in (1.93 m)	220 lb (100 kg)	1915–01–06	Duquesne
C	10	Huck Hartman	6 ft 7 in (2.01 m)	205 lb (93 kg)	1920–10–23	Washington & Jefferson
F		Bob Henshaw	6 ft 0 in (1.83 m)	180 lb (82 kg)	1918–09–15	Mount Union
G		Larry Kenney	5 ft 11 in (1.80 m)	180 lb (82 kg)	1914–01–07	Saint Joseph's
G/F		Nick Lalich	6 ft 3 in (1.91 m)	190 lb (86 kg)	1916–11–05	Marquette
F/C		Pete Lalich	6 ft 2 in (1.88 m)	190 lb (86 kg)	1924–06–18	Ohio
G	3	Press Maravich	6 ft 0 in (1.83 m)	185 lb (84 kg)	1915–08–29	Davis & Elkins
F	2	Walt Miller	6 ft 2 in (1.88 m)	190 lb (86 kg)	1915–07–30	Duquesne
F/C	9	Leo Mogus	6 ft 4 in (1.93 m)	190 lb (86 kg)	1921–04–13	Youngstown State
G		Stan Noszka	6 ft 1 in (1.85 m)	185 lb (84 kg)	1920–09–19	Duquesne
F/C		Bob Shaw	6 ft 4 in (1.93 m)	226 lb (103 kg)	1921–05–22	Ohio State
G		Joe Urso	5 ft 10 in (1.78 m)	170 lb (77 kg)	1916–09–17	Duquesne
C		Don Warnke	6 ft 10 in (2.08 m)	200 lb (91 kg)	1920–04–08	Valparaiso
G		John Wright	6 ft 1 in (1.85 m)	175 lb (79 kg)	1921–01–08	George Washington

Coaches
Head coach
- Paul Birch

Legend
- (DP) Unsigned draft pick
- (FA) Free agent
- (S) Suspended
- Injured

Roster

== Regular season ==
=== NBL Schedule ===
Not to be confused with exhibition or other non-NBL scheduled games that did not count towards Youngstown's official NBL record for this season. An official database created by John Grasso detailing every NBL match possible (outside of two matches that the Kankakee Gallagher Trojans won over the Dayton Metropolitans in 1938) would be released in 2026 showcasing every team's official schedules throughout their time spent in the NBL. As such, these are the official results recorded for the Youngstown Bears during their first season in the NBL.

#	Date	Opponent	Score	Record
1	November 26	Sheboygan	39–45	0–1
2	December 2	@ Cleveland	32–33	0–2
3	December 3	Rochester	40–48	0–3
4	December 5	N Oshkosh	43–60	0–4
5	December 6	@ Sheboygan	34–52	0–5
6	December 8	@ Rochester	47–61	0–6
7	December 10	Fort Wayne	52–71	0–7
8	December 16	@ Fort Wayne	59–74	0–8
9	December 17	Sheboygan	46–48	0–9
10	December 23	@ Indianapolis	44–35	1–9
11	December 26	Oshkosh	53–41	2–9
12	December 28	@ Chicago	47–45	3–9
13	December 29	@ Oshkosh	50–59	3–10
14	December 30	@ Fort Wayne	44–60	3–11
15	December 31	Cleveland	43–35	4–11
16	January 5	@ Rochester	27–70	4–12
17	January 6	@ Cleveland	58–51	5–12
18	January 7	Indianapolis	44–37	6–12
19	January 16	Rochester	50–58	6–13
20	January 21	Cleveland	45–38	7–13
21	January 28	Chicago	35–47	7–14
22	January 31	Fort Wayne	60–57	8–14
23	February 4	Rochester	47–50	8–15
24	February 7	Oshkosh	49–45	9–15
25	February 11	Indianapolis	33–43	9–16
26	February 17	@ Cleveland	46–50	9–17
27	February 18	Cleveland	52–38	10–17
28	February 19	@ Chicago	39–46	10–18
29	February 21	@ Sheboygan	44–42	11–18
30	February 24	@ Fort Wayne	54–59	11–19
—	February 25	Chicago	Postponed (Make-up Date: March 11, 1946)	
31	March 6	Fort Wayne	62–60	12–19
32	March 9	@ Rochester	47–70	12–20
33	March 11	Chicago	54–38	13–20

For some unknown reason, the Youngstown Bears would have a road game in Indianapolis, Indiana, against the Indianapolis Kautskys (in a currently unknown date, but likely near the end of the season) that ended up getting cancelled this season.

=== Season standings ===
Pos.	Eastern Division	Wins	Losses	Win %
1	Fort Wayne Zollner Pistons	26	8	.765
2	Rochester Royals	24	10	.706
3	Youngstown Bears	13	20	.394
4	Cleveland Allmen Transfers	4	29	.121

=== Awards and honors ===
- Second Team All-NBL – Frank Baumholtz
