= 1945–46 Indianapolis Kautskys season =

NBL professional basketball team season

- Head coach: Nat Hickey (player-coach)
- General manager: Frank Kautsky; Paul A. Walk
- Owner(s): Frank Kautsky; Paul A. Walk
- Arena: Butler Fieldhouse

Results
- Record: 10–22 (.313)
- Place: Division: 4th (Western)
- Playoff finish: Did not qualify

The 1945–46 Indianapolis Kautskys season was the fifth professional basketball season of play that the Kautskys franchise would not only utilize that name for their team, but also played in the United States' National Basketball League (NBL), which was also the ninth year the league existed. However, if you include their previous three seasons where they played in predecessor leagues of sorts in the National Professional Basketball League and the Midwest Basketball Conference, as well as the independent seasons they had in their history (including the three years they appeared in the World Professional Basketball Tournament where they played as the Indianapolis Pure Oils and Indianapolis Oilers during the World War II era), this would actually be their eleventh (or fourteenth) season of play as the Kautskys within the wild history of the NBL. This would be the second time in franchise history that the Kautskys franchise would return to the NBL as a proper team after previously returning to the NBL in the 1941–42 NBL season back when they realized their barnstorming experiment was a dud for them, but before they found out that the U.S.A. was going to enter World War II themselves following the Attack on Pearl Harbor, this time returning on a more stable-looking basis (albeit with Paul A. Walk as a co-owner instead of original co-owner Abe Goldsmith) after seeing that the Allied forces had won World War II following the bombings of Hiroshima and Nagasaki. Eight teams competed in the NBL in the 1945–46 season, which was composed of four teams in both the Eastern and Western Divisions (including the Indianapolis Kautskys in the Western Division) after the Kautskys' re-inclusion into the NBL and the Rochester Royals' inclusion (now known as the Sacramento Kings of the NBA) and the Youngstown Bears' inclusion replacing the departure of the Pittsburgh Raiders (a rebranded version of the Pittsburgh Pirates NBL team) brought the league's strength back up to its strongest strength of competition since its third season of existence. This season also saw them utilizing Nat Hickey as a player-coach for their squad, with Hickey being the oldest player in the NBL by this point in time as a player that was born back in the year 1902.

After Indianapolis won their first game back in their second return to the NBL against the Chicago American Gears, the Kautskys would end their 1945 year with a 10-game losing streak that would ultimately affect the rest of their season in a significant manner. While Indianapolis would start 1946 out in a much better way with a close 55–54 road victory over the Cleveland Allmen Transfers on New Year's Day, that previous year's losing streak would ultimately set the tone for this season's squad, with the Kautskys only winning two or more NBL games in two different periods of time (winning three NBL games from January 20 to February 3 against the Allmen Transfers, Oshkosh All-Stars and eventual NBL champion Rochester Royals and then two straight games on February 10 and 11 against both Rochester and the Youngstown Bears). Because of the poor performances they had throughout their second return into the NBL this season, the Kautskys would finish the season with arguably their worst season in the NBL with a 10–22 record (with Indianapolis being the only team to have two games of their being cancelled this season instead of just one, if not no games cancelled at all), with their record being seen as only being above that of the Eastern Division's Cleveland Allmen Transfers, who decided to fold operations by the end of the season and be replaced by the Syracuse Nationals (now Philadelphia 76ers of the NBA) going forward. Despite the poor performances they had throughout the season, they would still see Jerry Steiner be named a member of the All-NBL Second Team this season.

== Roster ==
Please note that due to the way records for professional basketball leagues like the NBL and the ABL were recorded at the time, some information on both teams and players may be harder to list out than usual here.

1945–46 Indianapolis Kautskys roster
Players

Pos.	No.	Player	Height	Weight	DOB	From
G/F		Ernie Andres	6 ft 1 in (1.85 m)	200 lb (91 kg)	1920–05–11	Indiana
G		Bob Baker	5 ft 11 in (1.80 m)	160 lb (73 kg)	1919–02–24	Franklin (IN)
F/C		Jim Birr	6 ft 3 in (1.91 m)	215 lb (98 kg)	1916–08–22	Indiana
C		Bob Brown	6 ft 7 in (2.01 m)	222 lb (101 kg)	1921–02–20	Oklahoma
G/F	3	Bob Dietz	6 ft 1 in (1.85 m)	164 lb (74 kg)	1917–12–04	Butler
G/F		George Fields	5 ft 11 in (1.80 m)	170 lb (77 kg)	1921–07–09	Purdue
F		Chet Francis	6 ft 2 in (1.88 m)	180 lb (82 kg)	1918–05–01	Indiana
F/C	7	Bob Gerber	6 ft 4 in (1.93 m)	190 lb (86 kg)	1916–08–01	Toledo
G/F		Ken Gunning	5 ft 11 in (1.80 m)	170 lb (77 kg)	1914–06–04	Indiana
G/F	12	Nat Hickey	5 ft 11 in (1.80 m)	180 lb (82 kg)	1902–01–30	Hoboken HS (NJ)
G/F	9	Roy Hurley	6 ft 2 in (1.88 m)	170 lb (77 kg)	1922–08–12	Arsenal Technical HS (IN)
G/F		Oren Nichols	6 ft 3 in (1.91 m)	185 lb (84 kg)	1918–05–07	Anderson HS (IN)?
G/F	6	Woody Norris	6 ft 1 in (1.85 m)	170 lb (77 kg)	1919–06–18	Butler
C	11	Arnie Risen	6 ft 9 in (2.06 m)	200 lb (91 kg)	1924–10–09	Ohio State
G		George Rung	6 ft 0 in (1.83 m)	185 lb (84 kg)	1916–05–27	Miami (OH)
G		Eddie Sadowski	5 ft 10 in (1.78 m)	175 lb (79 kg)	1915–02–02	Notre Dame
F		Rusty Saunders	6 ft 2 in (1.88 m)	215 lb (98 kg)	1906–03–12	Central HS (NJ)
G/F		Wilbur Schumacher	5 ft 11 in (1.80 m)	150 lb (68 kg)	1920–03–06	Butler
G	10	Chips Sobek	6 ft 0 in (1.83 m)	180 lb (82 kg)	1920–02–10	Notre Dame
G		Jerry Steiner	5 ft 7 in (1.70 m)	160 lb (73 kg)	1918–01–07	Butler
G		Dave Strack	5 ft 11 in (1.80 m)	175 lb (79 kg)	1923–03–02	Michigan
F/C		John Styler	6 ft 6 in (1.98 m)	225 lb (102 kg)	1923–10–19	Unknown
C		Jake Weber	6 ft 6 in (1.98 m)	225 lb (102 kg)	1918–03–18	Purdue
G/F		Jewell Young	6 ft 0 in (1.83 m)	160 lb (73 kg)	1913–01–18	Purdue

Coaches
Head coach
- Nat Hickey

Legend
- (DP) Unsigned draft pick
- (FA) Free agent
- (S) Suspended
- Injured

Roster

== Regular season ==
=== Season standings ===
Pos.	Western Division	Wins	Losses	Win %
1	Sheboygan Red Skins	21	13	.618
2	Oshkosh All-Stars	19	15	.559
3	Chicago American Gears	17	17	.500
4	Indianapolis Kautskys	10	22	.313

=== NBL Schedule ===
Not to be confused with exhibition or other non-NBL scheduled games that did not count towards Indianapolis' official NBL record for this season. An official database created by John Grasso detailing every NBL match possible (outside of two matches that the Kankakee Gallagher Trojans won over the Dayton Metropolitans in 1938) would be released in 2026 showcasing every team's official schedules throughout their time spent in the NBL. As such, these are the official results recorded for the Indianapolis Kautskys during their fifth season in the NBL (first season in their second return) under that name for the league.

#	Date	Opponent	Score	Record
1	November 23	@ Chicago	40–35	1–0
2	November 24	@ Oshkosh	47–65	1–1
3	November 25	Cleveland	44–51	1–2
4	December 5	N Sheboygan	56–61	1–3
5	December 9	@ Oshkosh	37–52	1–4
6	December 16	Chicago	43–48	1–5
7	December 20	@ Sheboygan	43–53	1–6
8	December 21	@ Chicago	41–54	1–7
9	December 22	@ Oshkosh	40–44	1–8
10	December 23	Youngstown	35–44	1–9
11	December 30	Sheboygan	49–59	1–10
12	January 1	@ Cleveland	55–54	2–10
13	January 6	@ Fort Wayne	46–49	2–11
14	January 7	@ Youngstown	37–44	2–12
15	January 9	Fort Wayne	47–60	2–13
16	January 16	Chicago	47–52	2–14
17	January 17	@ Sheboygan	49–41	3–14
18	January 18	@ Chicago	39–41 (OT)	3–15
19	January 20	Cleveland	49–33	4–15
20	January 27	Oshkosh	43–33	5–15
21	February 3	Rochester	47–36	6–15
22	February 7	Fort Wayne	39–43	6–16
23	February 9	@ Rochester	57–65	6–17
24	February 10	@ Rochester	56–49	7–17
25	February 11	@ Youngstown	43–33	8–17
26	February 12	@ Fort Wayne	55–72	8–18
27	February 14	Chicago	73–47	9–18
28	February 17	Sheboygan	34–42	9–19
29	February 22	@ Oshkosh	40–61	9–20
30	February 23	@ Oshkosh	45–66	9–21
31	February 24	@ Sheboygan	54–37	10–21
32	March 4	@ Rochester	52–72	10–22

The Indianapolis Kautskys had intended to play two different games this season against the Cleveland Allmen Transfers and Youngstown Bears, with their match against Youngstown being at home in Indianapolis, Indiana and their match against Cleveland being on the road in Cleveland, Ohio. However, for reasons unknown (likely because of weather issues involved in both locations), those games were eventually delayed before ultimately being cancelled entirely, with neither of those games affecting the final standings' results in a significant manner, especially due to each of the Cleveland Allmen Transfers, Indianapolis Kautskys, and Youngstown Bears being the three worst teams in the NBL that season.

== Awards and honors ==
- Second Team All-NBL – Jerry Steiner
- NBL All-Time Team – Arnie Risen

== World Professional Basketball Tournament ==
After presumably not competing in the World Professional Basketball Tournament from 1943 until 1945 due to World War II (though it's alleged that they did compete under those events under the Indianapolis Pure Oils and Indianapolis Oilers team names instead) after previously first doing so in 1941 and 1942 (with the 1941 event being done while they were a barnstorming club), the Indianapolis Kautskys would return to the WPBT once again for the 1946 event (at least under their Kautskys name properly once again), with the annual event being held in Chicago from March 25–April 8, 1946 and consisted mostly of independently ran teams and six of the eight NBL teams (missing the Youngstown Bears and the new NBL champion Rochester Royals) alongside the American Basketball League's champion team, the Baltimore Bullets. As such, in the first round for this year's event, the Kautskys would see themselves go up against a new works team that would supposedly have its origins in the Amateur Athletic Union early on with the Midland Dow Chemicals, who were a team created by the Dow Chemical Company located up in Midland, Michigan. While Arnie Risen would lead the Kautskys with 20 points scored in that match, it would be former NBL center Slim Wintermute that would lead all scorers for that match with 23 points for the Dow Chemicals, as Midland would upset the returning Indianapolis squad with a 72–59 victory on their end, thus ending the Kautskys' WPBT run once again and leaving them winless at that tournament for another year. As for the Dow Chemicals roster, they would end up being eliminated by the Fort Wayne Zollner Pistons in the following match played in the quarterfinal round, with Fort Wayne later being three-time WPBT champions by winning this year's championship series 2–1 over the Oshkosh All-Stars in a best of three series, which was the only time the WPBT utilized a best-of-three format for their championship series instead of a simple winner takes all format.

=== Game Played ===
- Lost first round (59–72) to the Midland Dow Chemicals
