= 1945–46 Sheboygan Red Skins season =

NBL professional basketball team season

- Division champions
- Head coach: Dutch Dehnert
- Arena: Sheboygan Municipal Auditorium and Armory

Results
- Record: 21–13 (.618)
- Place: Division: 1st (Western)
- Playoff finish: Lost NBL Championship to Rochester Royals, 3–0

The 1945–46 Sheboygan Red Skins season was the Red Skins' eighth year in the United States' National Basketball League (NBL), which would also be the ninth year the NBL itself existed. However, if one were to include their few seasons they played as an independent team under a few various team names involving local businesses like the The Ballhorns (being sponsored by a local florist and funeral parlor), the Art Imigs (being sponsored by a local dry cleaning shop owned and operated by a man named Art Imig with team jerseys saying Art Imig's), and the Enzo Jels (being sponsored by a local gelatin manufacturer known as Enzo-Pac) at various points before becoming the Sheboygan Red Skins due to their promotion up into the NBL, this would officially be their thirteenth overall season of play as well. Entering this season, the NBL would return to its highest point of competition from before World War II yet, with not just the Indianapolis Kautskys returning to the NBL following World War II's end, but also seeing the Rochester Royals join the NBL on their own accord (with them changing their team name from the Pros to the Royals after previously starting out as the Rochester Seagrams back in 1923 and then briefly being the Rochester Eber Seagrams) and the Youngstown Bears replacing the Pittsburgh Raiders (to the point where they had previously been considered an extension of the franchise, according to The Compendium of Professional Basketball, as opposed to their own team that had desired to have the Pittsburgh squad play in Youngstown under their own ownership group) for a total of eight NBL teams for this season. As a result of this, for the second straight season in a row (and fourth overall season), the Red Skins would represent the Western Division, with the NBL being composed of four teams each in both the Eastern Division and the Western Division (Sheboygan's division) this season.

The Red Skins played their home games at the Sheboygan Municipal Auditorium and Armory. After having an average November, Sheboygan would showcase themselves as one of the best teams in the NBL once again with an 11–5 record by the end of the 1945 year, later becoming 12–5 by New Year's Day in 1946. By January 1946, the Red Skins would have their record be a more balanced looking 16–8 record before ending the season with a 21–13 record after ending the month of February with a 20–12 record. For the fifth time ever in franchise history (1941 & 1943–1945) and the fourth (and final) straight year in a row, the Red Skins advanced to the NBL Championship, with Sheboygan splitting their games played against the Oshkosh All-Stars to win their Western Division Playoff series (the last time the opening round of the Division Playoffs in the NBL would go under the Division Playoff name) 3–2 in a best-of-five series. They then went on to compete in their last NBL championship series against one of the newest NBL teams added in the Rochester Royals, with Rochester sweeping the Red Skins 3–2 in another best-of-five series. Both of Sheboygan's centers in Ed Dancker (First Team) and Mike Novak (Second Team) also earned All-NBL honors by the end of this season. Following this season's conclusion, Dutch Dehnert would resign from his duties as head coach this season, which led to Doxie Moore becoming the new head coach for the team there.

== Roster ==
1945–46 Sheboygan Red Skins roster
Players

Pos.	No.	Player	Height	Weight	DOB	From
F/C		Ken Buehler	6 ft 2 in (1.88 m)	185 lb (84 kg)	1919–11–19	Milwaukee
C	22	Ed Dancker	6 ft 7 in (2.01 m)	200 lb (91 kg)	1914–03–14	South Division HS (WI)
F		Charlie Epperson	6 ft 2 in (1.88 m)	180 lb (82 kg)	1919–06–16	Wisconsin
F/C		Pop Goodwin	6 ft 2 in (1.88 m)	203 lb (92 kg)	1920–12–20	St. John's Prep (NY)
G/F	19	Al Grenert	6 ft 0 in (1.83 m)	190 lb (86 kg)	1919–07–08	NYU
G/F		Don Harvey	5 ft 11 in (1.80 m)	190 lb (86 kg)	1920–07–29	Missouri
F/C	18	Kleggie Hermsen	6 ft 9 in (2.06 m)	225 lb (102 kg)	1923–03–12	Minnesota
G	23	Bobby Holm	6 ft 0 in (1.83 m)	200 lb (91 kg)	1919–01–22	Seton Hall
G	16	Tony Kelly	6 ft 1 in (1.85 m)	165 lb (75 kg)	1919–02–18	DePaul
F	25	John Kotz	6 ft 3 in (1.91 m)	200 lb (91 kg)	1919–03–27	Wisconsin
G/F	24	Rube Lautenschlager	6 ft 2 in (1.88 m)	190 lb (86 kg)	1915–09–07	UW–Oshkosh
G/F	15	Al Lucas	6 ft 3 in (1.91 m)	195 lb (88 kg)	1922–07–04	Fordham
F/C	21	Mike Novak	6 ft 9 in (2.06 m)	219 lb (99 kg)	1915–04–23	Loyola Chicago
G	26	Mickey Rottner	5 ft 10 in (1.78 m)	180 lb (82 kg)	1919–03–23	Loyola Chicago
G/F	20	Dick Schulz	6 ft 2 in (1.88 m)	192 lb (87 kg)	1917–01–03	Wisconsin
G/F	17	Steve Sharkey	6 ft 0 in (1.83 m)	190 lb (86 kg)	1918–12–30	Nott Terrance HS (NY)
G		Ken Suesens	6 ft 1 in (1.85 m)	175 lb (79 kg)	1916–10–23	Iowa
G/F		Babe Ziegenhorn	6 ft 0 in (1.83 m)	185 lb (84 kg)	1918–11–21	Notre Dame

Coaches
Head coach
- Dutch Dehnert

Legend
- (DP) Unsigned draft pick
- (FA) Free agent
- (S) Suspended
- Injured

Roster

Note: Ken Buehler, Charlie Epperson, Pop Goodwin, Rube Lautenschlager, and Babe Ziegenhorn were not on the playoff roster. Not only that, but Don Harvey, John Kotz, and Ken Suesens would later join them for not participating within the 1946 World Professional Basketball Tournament, though Fred Lewis would be added to their roster for that event.

== Regular season ==
=== Season standings ===
Pos.	Western Division	Wins	Losses	Win %
1	Sheboygan Red Skins	21	13	.618
2	Oshkosh All-Stars	19	15	.559
3	Chicago American Gears	17	17	.500
4	Indianapolis Kautskys	10	22	.313

=== NBL Schedule ===
Not to be confused with exhibition or other non-NBL scheduled games that did not count towards Sheboygan's official NBL record for this season. An official database created by John Grasso detailing every NBL match possible (outside of two matches that the Kankakee Gallagher Trojans won over the Dayton Metropolitans in 1938) would be released in 2026 showcasing every team's official schedules throughout their time spent in the NBL. As such, these are the official results recorded for the Sheboygan Red Skins during their eighth season in the NBL.

#	Date	Opponent	Score	Record
1	November 22	Chicago	53–49	1–0
2	November 24	@ Rochester	52–53	1–1
3	November 26	@ Youngstown	45–39	2–1
4	November 29	Oshkosh	30–33	2–2
5	December 2	@ Oshkosh	36–47	2–3
6	December 5	N Indianapolis	61–56	3–3
7	December 6	Youngstown	52–34	4–3
8	December 9	@ Fort Wayne	52–70	4–4
9	December 13	Fort Wayne	57–54 (2OT)	5–4
10	December 14	@ Chicago	47–42	6–4
11	December 16	@ Cleveland	51–48	7–4
12	December 17	@ Youngstown	48–46	8–4
13	December 18	@ Rochester	49–61	8–5
14	December 20	Indianapolis	53–43	9–5
15	December 27	Chicago	46–38	10–5
16	December 30	@ Indianapolis	59–49	11–5
17	January 1	Oshkosh	54–42	12–5
18	January 4	@ Chicago	52–55	12–6
19	January 5	@ Oshkosh	46–53	12–7
20	January 10	Cleveland	78–53	13–7
21	January 17	Indianapolis	41–49	13–8
22	January 19	@ Cleveland	51–42	14–8
23	January 24	Rochester	52–41	15–8
24	January 31	Oshkosh	52–48 (OT)	16–8
25	February 7	Chicago	46–47	16–9
26	February 10	@ Chicago	71–65	17–9
27	February 14	Fort Wayne	50–63	17–10
28	February 16	@ Oshkosh	56–52	18–10
29	February 17	@ Indianapolis	42–34	19–10
30	February 21	Youngstown	42–44	19–11
31	February 24	Indianapolis	37–54	19–12
32	February 28	Rochester	59–35	20–12
33	March 3	@ Fort Wayne	49–53	20–13
34	March 7	Cleveland	67–47	21–13

== NBL Playoffs ==
=== NBL Western Division Playoff ===
(1W) Sheboygan Red Skins vs. (2W) Oshkosh All-Stars: Sheboygan wins series 3–2

- Game 1: March 12, 1946 @ Sheboygan: Sheboygan 46, Oshkosh 45
- Game 2: March 13, 1946 @ Sheboygan: Oshkosh 53, Sheboygan 41
- Game 3: March 14, 1946 @ Oshkosh: Sheboygan 58, Oshkosh 52
- Game 4: March 16, 1946 @ Oshkosh: Oshkosh 68, Sheboygan 42
- Game 5: March 17, 1946 @ Sheboygan: Sheboygan 65, Oshkosh 46

=== NBL Championship ===
(1W) Sheboygan Red Skins vs. (2E) Rochester Royals: Rochester wins series 3–0

- Game 1: March 19, 1946 @ Rochester: Rochester 60, Sheboygan 50
- Game 2: March 21, 1946 @ Rochester: Rochester 61, Sheboygan 54
- Game 3: March 24, 1946 @ Sheboygan: Rochester 66, Sheboygan 48

=== Awards and honors ===
- First Team All-NBL – Ed Dancker
- Second Team All-NBL – Mike Novak
- All-Time NBL Team – Ed Dancker and Mike Novak

== World Professional Basketball Tournament ==
For the seventh time in eight years, the Sheboygan Red Skins would participate in the annual World Professional Basketball Tournament in Chicago, which the 1946 event was held on March 25–April 8, 1946 and was mostly held by independently ran teams alongside six out of eight NBL teams from this season (with the new NBL champion Rochester Royals and the Youngstown Bears not participating in it) and the rivaling American Basketball League's newest champions in the Baltimore Bullets. The Red Skins were given a first round bye alongside the two-time WPBT champions in the Fort Wayne Zollner Pistons due to them being two of the best NBL teams this season. For the first (and only) match in the quarterfinal round, Sheboygan would go up against the local tournament's team in the Chicago American Gears, who had entered this tournament with two new additions added onto their team with Price Brookfield and star rookie center George Mikan from DePaul University joining the team for this tournament (and later being a part of the team for the upcoming NBL season afterward). While the match between those two teams would be a very close and tense one, unfortunately for Sheboygan, Chicago would gain the upper hand on them in the end, as the American Gears would upset the Red Skins in a close 52–51 match to end the Red Skins' return to the WPBT after previously missing out on the 1945 event for unknown reasons (but might relate to the passing of the son of head coach Dutch Dehnert during World War II while Dehnert's son, John Dehnert Jr., was killed in action within Nazi Germany at the time). The American Gears would end up losing to the Oshkosh All-Stars in the semifinal round due to them fouling out multiple key players of theirs (with Oshkosh later losing the championship series 2–1 to the Fort Wayne Zollner Pistons for Fort Wayne being three-time WPBT champions there), while the Chicago American Gears ended up sweeping the Baltimore Bullets 2–0 in the third place consolation prize series there, with George Mikan also (interestingly enough) being named the WPBT MVP this time around despite them not being in the championship series there.

=== Game Played ===
- Sheboygan had a bye in the first round.
- Lost quarterfinal round (51–52) to the Chicago American Gears.
