= 1945–46 Chicago American Gears season =

NBL professional basketball team season

- Head coach: Swede Roos
- General manager: Walter Altmeyer
- Owner(s): Maurice White; American Gear & Manufacturing Company
- Arena: Cicero Stadium

Results
- Record: 17–17 (.500)
- Place: Division: 3rd (Western)
- Playoff finish: Did not qualify Won third place at 1946 WPBT over Baltimore Bullets, 2–0

The 1945–46 Chicago American Gears season was the American Gears' second year in the United States' National Basketball League (NBL), which was also the ninth year the league existed. However, if you include the (at least) one previous season where they competed in the Amateur Athletic Union before making the jump into the NBL, this would actually be their third season of play instead. With the inclusion of both the Rochester Royals and Youngstown Bears (the latter of which being considered in exchange for the Pittsburgh Raiders and their players since the Bears would acquire most of the Raiders' players this season) alongside the second return of the Indianapolis Kautskys following the end of World War II, this led to the NBL being at its strongest point of contention since the 1939–40 NBL season with eight teams competing in the 1945–46 season, four teams in each of the Eastern and Western Divisions.

Chicago played their home games at the Cicero Stadium for this season, which held only 2,000 total people for attendance by comparison to the larger Chicago Stadium they used for their previous season. During this season, team owner Maurice White implemented an interesting bonus system for the players on the team where, for every victory that the team had (and only for the victories the team had), the players would receive bonuses of $6 for every basket made and $3 for every free-throw made (later adding an extra $3 for every assist at hand as well); while some of the players suggested to pool the bonus money up and split it amongst themselves by the end of the season, it ultimately wasn't a unanimous decision, meaning the original bonus plan stuck instead. Despite finishing this season with an average 17–17 record this season in the Western Division, the American Gears would ultimately not make it to the NBL Playoffs this season, which turned out to be the first and only time in their history that they would fail to do so in their history due to the Oshkosh All-Stars making significant improvements to their roster following the conclusion to World War II. Not only that, but people had noticed the effects White's bonus system had on the basketball court, to the point where it can be suggested that this season's team was the first team to make bonuses in player contracts become a thing in the first place. Furthermore, had the American Gears made it to the 1946 NBL Playoffs instead of Oshkosh as the second Western Division team alongside the Sheboygan Red Skins, they would have implemented both Price Brookfield and George Mikan (the latter being confirmed to sign a five-year deal worth $60,000) as secret weapons to utilize for that event instead of waiting until both the 1946 World Professional Basketball Tournament and the following NBL season for official play with them on their team.

In addition to the NBL Playoffs, the Chicago American Gears also participated in the World Professional Basketball Tournament as the local home team throughout the event as well. Unlike the previous year's event where they would only compete against independently ran teams, the 1946 event would see George Mikan debut with the team alongside Price Brookfield following two exhibition victories against the Anderson Chiefs and Detroit Mansfields, with immediate prominence being showcased against the former NBL turned independent team in the Pittsburgh Raiders in the first round and then showcasing a surprising upset against the Western Division champions, the Sheboygan Red Skins (who had a first round bye alongside the repeating two-time champion Fort Wayne Zollner Pistons), in the quarterfinal round. However, foul trouble during the second half of their game against the Oshkosh All-Stars would prevent the American Gears from entering the championship round of the WPBT against the Zollner Pistons, with them instead having a best-of-three series against the new champions of the rivaling American Basketball League, the Baltimore Bullets. From that point, the American Gears would end up sweeping the Bullets in the two games they ended up playing for the third place series they had in the WPBT, with new center George Mikan being named the MVP of the WPBT that year despite not even making it to the championship series that year due to his impact throughout the entire event for the local home team.

For this season, only Bob Calihan would earn All-NBL Second Team honors while playing for the Chicago American Gears.

== Roster ==
1945–46 Chicago American Gears roster
Players

Pos.	No.	Player	Height	Weight	DOB	From
F/C	12	Connie Mack Berry	6 ft 3 in (1.91 m)	200 lb (91 kg)	1915–04–19	NC State
G/F	8	Charlie Butler	6 ft 2 in (1.88 m)	165 lb (75 kg)	1920–08–15	Notre Dame
G/F	14	Bob Calihan	6 ft 3 in (1.91 m)	200 lb (91 kg)	1918–08–02	Detroit
F/C	–	Bob Cotton	6 ft 6 in (1.98 m)	250 lb (113 kg)	1920–12–29	Texas Wesleyan
F/C	13	Elmer Gainer	6 ft 6 in (1.98 m)	205 lb (93 kg)	1918–11–22	DePaul
G/F	7	Bill Hapac	6 ft 2 in (1.88 m)	190 lb (86 kg)	1918–01–26	Illinois
F/C	6	Nick Hashu	6 ft 1 in (1.85 m)	195 lb (88 kg)	1917–02–01	Michigan State
G/F	10	George Hogan	6 ft 1 in (1.85 m)	170 lb (77 kg)	1915–04–12	Loyola Chicago
F/C	8	Dick Klein	6 ft 3 in (1.91 m)	215 lb (98 kg)	1920–09–16	Northwestern
F/C	7	Ed Lewinski	6 ft 4 in (1.93 m)	210 lb (95 kg)	1918–09–10	Bowen HS (IL)
G/F	10, 17	Bobby Neu	6 ft 1 in (1.85 m)	170 lb (77 kg)	1917–06–28	DePaul
F	11	Bud O'Rourke	6 ft 4 in (1.93 m)	170 lb (77 kg)	1919–01–14	DePaul
F/C	12	Jim Olsen	6 ft 6 in (1.98 m)	205 lb (93 kg)	1921–06–02	Dartmouth
G	4	Johnny Orr	5 ft 11 in (1.80 m)	180 lb (82 kg)	1918–06–04	St. Benedict's
G/F	9	Stan Patrick	6 ft 2 in (1.88 m)	185 lb (84 kg)	1922–05–05	Illinois
F/C	5	George Ratkovicz	6 ft 6 in (1.98 m)	220 lb (100 kg)	1922–11–13	Robert E. Lindblom Technical HS (IL)
F	6	Bob Rensberger	6 ft 2 in (1.88 m)	170 lb (77 kg)	1921–03–07	Notre Dame
G	11	Stan Szukala	6 ft 1 in (1.85 m)	175 lb (79 kg)	1918–06–12	DePaul
G/F	3	Dick Triptow	6 ft 0 in (1.83 m)	170 lb (77 kg)	1922–11–03	DePaul

Coaches
Head coach
- Swede Roos
Assistant(s)
- Rey Meyer

Legend
- (DP) Unsigned draft pick
- (FA) Free agent
- (S) Suspended
- Injured

Roster

Note: Price Brookfield and George Mikan would play (or in Mikan's case, debut) with the American Gears after the 1946 NBL Playoffs (with the intention of having them both play for the team during the 1946 NBL Playoffs had Chicago made it there this season), with them notably playing for them during the 1946 World Professional Basketball Tournament in this season.

== Regular season ==
=== Season standings ===
Pos.	Western Division	Wins	Losses	Win %
1	Sheboygan Red Skins	21	13	.618
2	Oshkosh All-Stars	19	15	.559
3	Chicago American Gears	17	17	.500
4	Indianapolis Kautskys	10	22	.313

=== NBL Schedule ===
Reference: Dick Triptow's The Dynasty That Never Was

#	Date	Opponent	Score	Record
1	November 22	@ Sheboygan	49–53	0–1
2	November 23	Indianapolis	35–40	0–2
3	November 25	Oshkosh	47–38	1–2
4	December 7	Fort Wayne	51–60	1–3
5	December 8	@ Oshkosh	55–51	2–3
6	December 14	Sheboygan	42–47	2–4
7	December 16	@ Indianapolis	48–43	3–4
8	December 21	Indianapolis	54–43	4–4
9	December 27	@ Sheboygan	38–46	4–5
10	December 28	Youngstown	45–47	4–6
11	January 4	Sheboygan	55–52	5–6
12	January 9	Cleveland	51–37	6–6
13	January 12	@ Rochester	32–63	6–7
14	January 13	@ Fort Wayne	43–71	6–8
15	January 16	@ Indianapolis	52–47	7–8
16	January 18	Indianapolis	41–39 (OT)	8–8
17	January 19	@ Oshkosh	42–55	8–9
18	January 20	Oshkosh	49–48	9–9
19	January 25	Rochester	53–48	10–9
20	January 27	@ Cleveland	35–60	10–10
21	January 28	@ Youngstown	47–35	11–10
22	February 1	Fort Wayne	43–48	11–11
23	February 2	@ Oshkosh	51–69	11–12
24	February 7	@ Sheboygan	47–46	12–12
25	February 10	Sheboygan	65–71	12–13
26	February 14	@ Indianapolis	47–73	12–14
27	February 15	Oshkosh	66–67 (OT)	12–15
28	February 19	Youngstown	46–39	13–15
29	February 23	@ Rochester	56–68	13–16
30	February 24	@ Cleveland	51–50	14–16
—	February 25	@ Youngstown	Postponed (Make-up Date: March 11, 1946)	
31	March 1	Rochester	58–51	15–16
32	March 8	Cleveland	59–47	16–16
33	March 10	@ Fort Wayne	55–47	17–16
34	March 11	@ Youngstown	38–54	17–17

When it came to the Chicago American Gears for this season, each team in the Western Division would play each other a total of six times for 3 home and road games each, while each team in the Eastern Division would play each other a total of four times for 2 home and road games each (with Eastern Division teams reversing the order where they play other Eastern Division teams a total of six times for 3 home and road games each, while each team in the Western Division would play each other a total of four times for 2 home and road games each) for 34 total NBL season matches for this particular season of play. However, not every team would end up adhering to the 34 game standard for this season, as both the Cleveland Allmen Transfers and the newly-created Youngstown Bears in the Eastern Division only played 33 games this season, while the returning Indianapolis Kautskys from the Western Division played in only 32 games this season instead.

== Awards and honors ==
- All-NBL Second Team – Bob Calihan

== World Professional Basketball Tournament ==
In the second (and what would later turn out to be the final) time in franchise history, the Chicago American Gears would enter the annual World Professional Basketball Tournament in Chicago, which the 1946 event was held on March 25–April 8, 1946 and was mostly held by independently ran teams alongside six out of eight NBL teams from this season (only the new NBL champions in the Rochester Royals and the Youngstown Bears declined their entries this year) and the original Baltimore Bullets franchise from the American Basketball League. However, unlike every other team competing in this year's WPBT, the American Gears would have a home crowd advantage of sorts due to them representing the city of Chicago this year, similar to how things worked for them in the previous year's event, only the crowds felt more fired up for the hometown team winning their local tournament this time around by comparison to the previous season, especially due to the inclusion of both DePaul University star center George Mikan and Price Brookfield on the team, both of whom joined the team after the NBL Playoffs ended and played some exhibition games for the team against independently ran teams in the Anderson Chiefs on March 19 and the Detroit Mansfields the day after that (with both games being victories by Chicago) before the tournament began. In the first round, the American Gears would compete against a former NBL team that they had previously faced off against in their inaugural NBL season before that team left the NBL to become an independently operated franchise for the rest of their existence, the Pittsburgh Raiders. The match saw new center George Mikan already leading with 17 points scored, with three other Chicago players also scoring in the double-digits themselves with both Bob Calihan and Stan Patrick getting 15 points each and Stan Szukala putting up 10 points as the American Gears beat the Raiders one more time with a 69–58 victory that sadly had tragedy get involved due to the announcement of the passing of former Pittsburgh Raiders and, at the time, current Youngstown Bears star player Huck Hartman due to pneumonia at 25 years old. Despite the downer announcement still in mind, local Chicago fans were still interested in seeing who their local squad would go up against next.

After a day of rest, the quarterfinal round would see the American Gears opening up what was considered to be the starting game of the "quadrupleheader" period set up on March 29 by going up against a fellow NBL squad for once in the Sheboygan Red Skins, who not only had acquired a first round bye in the WPBT this year alongside the two-time defending WPBT champions in the Fort Wayne Zollner Pistons, but had officially returned to action for the WPBT this year after previously having an inconspicuous absence from the previous year's tournament when they had entered in its previous events up until that point in time (though it probably related to World War II business at hand). While Sheboygan was expected to be a WPBT favorite for outsiders alongside the Zollner Pistons, the local Chicago squad would end up upsetting the Red Skins' return to the WPBT this season with a 52–51 comeback victory that was helped made assured on their ends by two late baskets scored by Stan Patrick. However, the American Gears' leading scorers for that match was George Mikan with 14 points and Bob Calihan with 9 points scored on their ends. Regardless, Chicago's upset over a potential tournament favorite in an early round match led to the local fans getting into screaming excitement over the team's semifinal match and potentially making it to the championship round this time around when they had failed to make it in the previous year's event.

On April 3, the semifinal round would see the American Gears open up the semifinal round against another NBL team within their division, the Oshkosh All-Stars, who had previously won the 1942 WPBT alongside NBL championships in 1941 and 1942 (with their latter championship making Oshkosh become the first dual champion for both the NBL and WPBT back when both leagues existed). Unfortunately for Chicago, however, after leading 36–33 in the first half of the game, they would see a strategy implemented during the second half that would completely shift the tide of the quarterfinal match against them by seeing Oshkosh fouling out some of their key players (notably George Mikan early in the third quarter after he scored a game-high 25 points alongside Dick Triptow, with Stan Szukala and George Ratkovicz being fouled out in the fourth quarter) to see the All-Stars lead 50–44 in the third quarter before Oshkosh ultimately defeated the American Gears 72–66, thus leaving Chicago with another third place consolation prize match-up (which would become a best-of-three series this time around for the American Gears instead of a winner takes all event).

Finally, for the third place consolation prize round, Chicago would go up against the rivaling American Basketball League's newest champions in the Baltimore Bullets (who had previously beaten the Dayton Mickeys and Anderson Chiefs in the first two rounds before losing a close 49–50 match-up to the two-time defending champion Fort Wayne Zollner Pistons), with this being the only time both the championship round and third place consolation prize round would become a best of three series instead of a single winner taking all competition. While the championship match-up would prove to utilize the best of three series to its full advantage between Fort Wayne and Oshkosh, the third place consolation prize round would prove to not need it so much by comparison. In the first game of the third place consolation prize round on April 5, the Baltimore Bullets would make things feel more competitive for the Chicago American Gears, but the American Gears would end up coming out on top with their first game with a 59–54 victory in Chicago's favor, with George Mikan leading the team once again by scoring 17 points that night. As for the second and final game in the series a day afterward, George Mikan and the American Gears would prove to be far too much for the ABL's Baltimore Bullets to overcome in their rematch, as it ended up becoming the only match Baltimore could not keep close in the WPBT, with George Mikan scoring a game-high 27 points to lead the American Gears to a 65–50 victory in their second match to sweep Baltimore 2–0 in their third place series, with Chicago deciding to not bother playing a third game even though there was an initial agreement to play a third game for the series, regardless of the outcome at the time. Even so, despite the American Gears not playing in the championship series properly, George Mikan would be named the WPBT's MVP this time around due to him being the most impactful player of the entire event this time around, which included him being the leading scorer of the event with 100 total points scored in five different games played. Not only that, but he was also named a member of the All-Tournament First Team, while Bob Calihan was named a member of the All-Tournament Second Team.

=== Scores ===
- Won first round (69–58) over the Pittsburgh Raiders
- Won quarterfinal round (52–51) over the Sheboygan Red Skins
- Lost semifinal round (66–72) to the Oshkosh All-Stars
- Won third place consolation prize series (2–0) over the Baltimore Bullets
  - Won April 5, 1946 third place consolation prize series match (59–54) over the Baltimore Bullets
  - Won April 6, 1946 third place consolation prize series match (65–50) over the Baltimore Bullets
    - No Game 3 was played on April 8, 1946 between Chicago and Baltimore.

=== Awards and honors ===
- George Mikan, All-Tournament First Team, MVP, scoring leader
- Bob Calihan, All-Tournament Second Team
