= 1945–46 Oshkosh All-Stars season =

NBL professional basketball team season

- Head coach: Lon Darling
- General manager: Lon Darling
- Owner: Lon Darling
- Arena: South Park School Gymnasium

Results
- Record: 19–15 (.559)
- Place: Division: 2nd (Western)
- Playoff finish: Lost Western Division Playoff to Sheboygan Red Skins, 3–2; Lost WPBT Championship series 2–1 to Fort Wayne Zollner Pistons

The 1945–46 Oshkosh All-Stars season was the All-Stars' ninth year in the United States' National Basketball League (NBL), which was also the ninth year the league existed. However, if one were to include the independent seasons they played starting all the way back in 1929 before beginning their NBL tenure in 1937, this would officially be their sixteenth season of play. For this season, eight teams would play in the 1945–46 NBL season due to the Rochester Royals and the Youngstown Bears being new teams added and the Indianapolis Kautskys returning to the NBL following the end of World War II while the Pittsburgh Raiders left the NBL altogether for good, meaning this would be the strongest NBL season in terms of available teams since the 1939–40 NBL season. As such, Oshkosh would compete in the Western Division once again, with four teams representing the Eastern Division and four teams (including Oshkosh) representing the Western Division. The All-Stars played their home games at the South Park School Gymnasium in the South Park Middle School within the Oshkosh Area School District.

Unlike their last few seasons of play within the NBL, Oshkosh would manage to find some consistent success once again within the NBL during this season (thanks, at least in part, to some of their key players like Bob Carpenter and Gene Englund returning to the team once again after serving the U.S. military in previous seasons). While they would not be able to repeat the same highs that they had throughout their early history in the NBL (to the point where they had risked getting another below-average season to their name once again a few times), a late-season push in late February and early March would help the All-Stars get back into the NBL Playoffs once again by finishing the season with a 1915 record for a second-place finish in the Western Division, which would be two games better than the Chicago American Gears team that had overtaken them the previous season (and was a team that would have utilized young star center George Mikan as a secret weapon for the NBL Playoffs alongside Price Brookfield had they somehow managed to overtake Oshkosh's position this season once again instead of falter into third place for this season). As such, the All-Stars' return to the NBL Playoffs would once again have them competing against their in-state rivals in the Sheboygan Red Skins in the Western Division Playoff, with them once again not having home court advantage to help themselves out (though this playoff series would have them compete in a best-of-five series this time around instead of the previously typical best-of-three types of match-ups that they usually got). Unfortunately for Oshkosh, the home court advantage that Sheboygan got would prove to be a bit of a difference maker once again for them, as while Oshkosh would take a game from the Red Skins in Game 2 through an easy victory following a close Game 1 defeat, Sheboygan would defeat the All-Stars at their home venue in a close match for Game 3 before they later blew them out of the water in the decisive fifth game of the series, though the Red Skins would fail to win another championship to their name due to the new Rochester Royals franchise sweeping what was considered to have been the more experienced Sheboygan franchise in the NBL Championship series. Following Oshkosh's elimination from the NBL Playoffs, they would see Bob Carpenter be named a member of the All-NBL First Team (as well as become the leading scorer for the entire NBL this season), while Leroy Edwards was named a member of the All-NBL Second Team for what later became the final time he would be named a member of an All-NBL Team in that league's existence.

In addition to the NBL Playoffs, the Oshkosh All-Stars also participated in the 1946 World Professional Basketball Tournament as well. The first half of their tournament run would involve them competing against independently ran teams in the Detroit Mansfields and the all-black New York Renaissance, while the second half of their tournament run had them against other NBL teams in the Chicago American Gears and the Fort Wayne Zollner Pistons. The semifinal round would be notable for Oshkosh giving young star center George Mikan (who would later be named the WPBT MVP that year) his first defeat in a professional setting while with the Chicago American Gears. However, the championship round would be more controversial for them due to this WPBT being the only one in the event's history where the championship round (and third place consolation prize round) would be a best-of-three series instead of a single winner-takes-all game, which would have led to Oshkosh being named the official champions of that tournament that year had it been like any other year for the WPBT. Instead, the extra games would give Fort Wayne the extra support necessary to help them upset Oshkosh in a 2–1 series defeat to give the Zollner Pistons their third straight tournament championship after Fort Wayne failed to win the NBL Championship this season. Had Oshkosh's first game been the only championship game that year, it would have made the Oshkosh All-Stars tie the Fort Wayne Zollner Pistons as the only other team to have two WPBT championships in the tournament's history instead of being eliminated in the championship round yet again during their history in the event's existence.

== Roster ==
1945–46 Oshkosh All-Stars roster
Players

Pos.	No.	Player	Height	Weight	DOB	From
F/C	15	Bob Carpenter	6 ft 5 in (1.96 m)	200 lb (91 kg)	1917–11–06	East Texas A&M
C	20	Leroy Edwards	6 ft 5 in (1.96 m)	210 lb (95 kg)	1914–04–11	Kentucky
G	16	Bud Engdahl	6 ft 1 in (1.85 m)	210 lb (95 kg)	1918–07–01	UW–Superior
F/C	12	Gene Englund	6 ft 5 in (1.96 m)	205 lb (93 kg)	1917–10–21	Wisconsin
F/C	8	Ed Erban	6 ft 4 in (1.93 m)	220 lb (100 kg)	1921–07–06	Marquette
G/F	11	Bob Feerick	6 ft 3 in (1.91 m)	190 lb (86 kg)	1920–01–02	Santa Clara
F		Dick Lange	6 ft 5 in (1.96 m)	195 lb (88 kg)	1921–06–03	UW–Whitewater
G/F		Pete Pasko	6 ft 2 in (1.88 m)	190 lb (86 kg)	1919–09–09	East Stroudsburg State
G/F	17	Erv Prasse	6 ft 2 in (1.88 m)	190 lb (86 kg)	1917–12–01	Iowa
G/F	10	Fred Rehm	6 ft 2 in (1.88 m)	195 lb (88 kg)	1921–05–18	Wisconsin
G/F	18	Eddie Riska	6 ft 0 in (1.83 m)	175 lb (79 kg)	1919–10–04	Notre Dame
G/F		Don Smith	6 ft 2 in (1.88 m)	190 lb (86 kg)	1920–07–27	Minnesota
G/F	9	Bob Sullivan	6 ft 0 in (1.83 m)	180 lb (82 kg)	1921–07–01	Wisconsin
G/F		Ray Terzynski	6 ft 1 in (1.85 m)	180 lb (82 kg)	1919–11–27	UW–Stevens Point
C	19	Clint Wager	6 ft 6 in (1.98 m)	210 lb (95 kg)	1920–01–20	Saint Mary's (MN)

Coaches
Head coach
- Lon Darling

Legend
- (DP) Unsigned draft pick
- (FA) Free agent
- (S) Suspended
- Injured

Roster

Note: Dick Lange, Pete Pasko, Don Smith, and Ray Terzynski were not a part of the playoff roster for this season, with both Ed Erban and Bob Sullivan not participating in the 1946 World Professional Basketball Tournament alongside them.

== Regular season ==
=== Season standings ===
Pos.	Western Division	Wins	Losses	Win %
1	Sheboygan Red Skins	21	13	.618
2	Oshkosh All-Stars	19	15	.559
3	Chicago American Gears	17	17	.500
4	Indianapolis Kautskys	10	22	.313

=== NBL Schedule ===
Not to be confused with exhibition or other non-NBL scheduled games that did not count towards Oshkosh's official NBL record for this season. An official database created by John Grasso detailing every NBL match possible (outside of two matches that the Kankakee Gallagher Trojans won over the Dayton Metropolitans in 1938) would be released in 2026 showcasing every team's official schedules throughout their time spent in the NBL. As such, these are the official results recorded for the Oshkosh All-Stars during their ninth season in the NBL.

#	Date	Opponent	Score	Record
1	November 24	Indianapolis	65–47	1–0
2	November 25	@ Chicago	38–47	1–1
3	November 29	@ Sheboygan	33–30	2–1
4	December 2	Sheboygan	42–36	3–1
5	December 5	N Youngstown	60–43	4–1
6	December 8	Chicago	51–55	4–2
7	December 9	Indianapolis	52–37	5–2
8	December 15	Fort Wayne	48–58	5–3
9	December 22	Indianapolis	44–40	6–3
10	December 23	@ Fort Wayne	44–53	6–4
11	December 26	@ Youngstown	41–53	6–5
12	December 29	Youngstown	59–50	7–5
13	January 1	@ Sheboygan	42–54	7–6
14	January 5	Sheboygan	53–46	8–6
15	January 12	Fort Wayne	45–46	8–7
16	January 19	Chicago	55–42	9–7
17	January 20	@ Chicago	48–49	9–8
18	January 22	@ Rochester	55–64	9–9
19	January 26	Rochester	52–45	10–9
20	January 27	@ Indianapolis	33–43	10–10
21	January 31	@ Sheboygan	48–52 (OT)	10–11
22	February 2	Chicago	69–51	11–11
23	February 4	@ Cleveland	59–43	12–11
24	February 5	@ Fort Wayne	59–68	12–12
25	February 7	@ Youngstown	45–49	12–13
26	February 9	Cleveland	77–45	13–13
27	February 15	@ Chicago	67–66 (OT)	14–13
28	February 16	Sheboygan	52–56	14–14
29	February 22	Indianapolis	61–40	15–14
30	February 23	Indianapolis	66–45	16–14
31	February 26	@ Rochester	58–50	17–14
32	March 2	Rochester	62–64	17–15
33	March 6	@ Rochester	67–59	18–15
34	March 9	Cleveland	60–46	19–15

== NBL Playoffs ==
=== NBL Western Division Playoff ===
(2W) Oshkosh All-Stars vs. (1W) Sheboygan Red Skins: Sheboygan wins series 3–2

- Game 1: March 12, 1946 @ Sheboygan: Sheboygan 46, Oshkosh 45
- Game 2: March 13, 1946 @ Sheboygan: Oshkosh 53, Sheboygan 41
- Game 3: March 14, 1946 @ Oshkosh: Sheboygan 58, Oshkosh 52
- Game 4: March 16, 1946 @ Oshkosh: Oshkosh 68, Sheboygan 42
- Game 5: March 17, 1946 @ Sheboygan: Sheboygan 65, Oshkosh 46

=== Awards and honors ===
- NBL leading scorer – Bob Carpenter
- First Team All-NBL – Bob Carpenter
- Second Team All-NBL – Leroy Edwards
- NBL All-Time Team – Bob Carpenter, Leroy Edwards, and Gene Englund

== World Professional Basketball Tournament ==
For the eighth straight year in a row, the Oshkosh All-Stars would participate in the annual World Professional Basketball Tournament in Chicago, which the 1946 event was held on March 25 – April 8, 1946 and was mostly held by independently ran teams alongside six out of eight teams in the NBL this season (with the new NBL champion Rochester Royals and the Youngstown Bears being the only two teams missing out on the even this season) and the rivaling American Basketball League's newest champions in the Baltimore Bullets. In the first round, Oshkosh would see themselves go up against the Detroit Mansfields once again, though they would end up crushing the Detroit squad with a 60–32 blowout victory as opposed to having a close victory over them in the previous year's event. In the quarterfinal round, the All-Stars would go up against the all-black New York Renaissance (the team who won the inaugural WPBT championship against the Oshkosh All-Stars), with Oshkosh managing to defeat the Renaissance through a close 50–44 victory thanks to balanced scoring efforts by Bob Carpenter scoring 14 points, Clint Wager scoring 12 points, and both Leroy Edwards and Fred Rehm each scoring 10 points there. By the semifinal round, Oshkosh would see themselves go up against the team that essentially held home court advantage throughout the tournament, the Chicago American Gears. Unlike this regular season's period, however, Oshkosh would have to try and manage to defeat the American Gears roster while holding two new secret weapons on their upgraded roster (both of whom were intended to have been signed up for the NBL Playoffs at the time had Chicago upset Oshkosh in the regular season's finale) in Price Brookfield and rookie star center George Mikan, with the latter proving to be especially challenging for most teams, never mind the Oshkosh All-Stars in particular, due to the size he had against the rest of their roster. Luckily for the All-Stars, they would manage to figure out how to expose a key weakness the American Gears had during the second half of the game after they were behind 36–33 in the first half of the game. In this specific case, Oshkosh would end up fouling out the likes of not just George Mikan (and Dick Triptow) during the third quarter (where the All-Stars would be up 50–44 in the third quarter after Mikan scored a game-high 25 points), but also fouled out the likes of Stan Szukala and George Ratkovicz in the fourth quarter for good measure to defeat Chicago once again with a 72–66 final score, thus giving Oshkosh their first return into the WPBT's championship round since the 1943 World Professional Basketball Tournament where they went up against the all-black Washington Lichtman Bears team that had been undefeated (or at least close to undefeated) up until that point in time.

For the championship round of the 1946 WPBT, the Oshkosh All-Stars would go up against the two-time defending WPBT champions of the event, the Fort Wayne Zollner Pistons, with a chance to tie Fort Wayne for the most WPBT championships in the event's history if they were to beat them in this series. In previous tournaments that they competed in, the championship round (alongside the third place consolation prize round) would be a simple winner takes all competition akin to the other rounds in this tournament, meaning that the first game played in that round against the Zollner Pistons would have had the All-Stars be crowned champions of the WPBT by default this time around due to them defeating the Zollner Pistons with a close 61–59 final score. However, for some unknown reason, this particular version of the WPBT (and only this version) would see the championship round (and the third place consolation prize round) utilize a best-of-three playoff format similar to what the NBL had done (which would explain why this tournament had the longest stretch of days around), meaning Oshkosh would have to win at least one more game in order to officially be crowned champions for this particular WPBT this time around. Unfortunately for the All-Stars, Fort Wayne would end up turning up the gas on their competitive machines following their close Game 1 defeat, which would make the rest of the series become a lot more difficult for Oshkosh. Because of that fact, the All-Stars would see the Zollner Pistons kick things up a notch in their final two matches of the tournament, with Oshkosh losing 47–56 in Game 2 and then being blown out with a 57–73 beatdown in Game 3 to see the All-Stars lose their WPBT championship on that final night, with Fort Wayne ending up getting a three-peat for the WPBT in the process. Interestingly, neither one of the championship competing teams would end up seeing an MVP be crowned for the event this time around, as rookie center George Mikan from the Chicago American Gears would be crowned the WPBT MVP this time around due to his overwhelming presence throughout the entire competition (even in the game that Oshkosh fouled him out on, which further solidified why he was considered the MVP of the entire event that year). With that being said, this event would be the first time since 1943 where Oshkosh's players would be named as members of the All-Tournament Team, with both Leroy Edwards and Bob Feerick being named members of the All-Tournament First Team, while returning guard Bob Carpenter would be named a member of the All-Tournament Second Team this time around.

=== Games ===
- Won first round (60–32) over Detroit Mansfields
- Won quarterfinal round (50–44) over New York Renaissance
- Won semifinal round (72–66) over Chicago American Gears
- Lost championship series (1–2) to Fort Wayne Zollner Pistons
  - Won April 5, 1946 championship series match (61–59) over Fort Wayne Zollner Pistons
  - Lost April 6, 1946 championship series match (47–56) to Fort Wayne Zollner Pistons
  - Lost April 8, 1946 championship series match (57–73) to Fort Wayne Zollner Pistons

=== Awards and Records ===
- Leroy Edwards, All-Tournament First Team
- Bob Feerick, All-Tournament First Team
- Bob Carpenter, All-Tournament Second Team
