= 1945–46 Rochester Royals season =

NBL professional basketball team season

- NBL champions
- Head coach: Les Harrison & Eddie Malanowicz
- Owners: Jack Harrison; Les Harrison
- Arena: Edgerton Park Arena

Results
- Record: 24–10 (.706)
- Place: Division: 2nd (Eastern)
- Playoff finish: NBL Champions (Defeated Sheboygan 3–0)
- Stats at Basketball Reference
- Radio: WHAM

The 1945–46 Rochester Royals season was the franchise's first season in the National Basketball League. This would also be considered the franchise's first official season as the Rochester Royals after previously being a mostly independent franchise that went by the name of the Rochester Seagrams all the way back in 1923 and then used the names of the Rochester Eber Seagrams and Rochester Pros in their last few seasons before utilizing the Rochester Royals name once they officially became a professional franchise. However, if those earlier incarnations are included, this season would represent the franchise's 23rd year of continuous play. This season was notable for the fact that the Royals would have the biggest victory in NBL history with a 70–27 blowout win on January 5, 1946, over the Youngstown Bears, who were also a new NBL team (one who only scored eleven total field-goals and five free-throws that night), though they would end up playing in that league for only one more season before folding operations altogether. They would also win their only NBL championship (and first professional basketball championship) during that season. The Royals would later win an NBA Finals championship five years later in 1951 after they later moved out into the National Basketball Association (which would become their only other professional basketball championship won ever since then), with the franchise now currently going by the Sacramento Kings.

== Roster ==
1945–46 Rochester Royals roster
Players

Pos.	No.	Player	Height	Weight	DOB	From
G/F		Al Cervi	5 ft 11 in (1.80 m)	170 lb (77 kg)	1917-02-12	East HS (NY)
F/C		Chuck Connors	6 ft 5 in (1.96 m)	190 lb (86 kg)	1921-04-10	Seton Hall
G/F		Bob Davies	6 ft 1 in (1.85 m)	175 lb (79 kg)	1920-01-15	Seton Hall
F/C		Bob Fitzgerald	6 ft 5 in (1.96 m)	190 lb (86 kg)	1923-03-14	Fordham
G		Jack Garfinkel	6 ft 0 in (1.83 m)	190 lb (86 kg)	1918-06-13	St. John's
F/C		George Glamack	6 ft 6 in (1.98 m)	225 lb (102 kg)	1919-06-07	North Carolina
G/F		Otto Graham	6 ft 1 in (1.85 m)	190 lb (86 kg)	1921-12-06	Northwestern
G		Red Holzman	5 ft 10 in (1.78 m)	175 lb (79 kg)	1920-08-10	CCNY
G/F		Andrew Levane	6 ft 2 in (1.88 m)	190 lb (86 kg)	1920-04-11	St. John's
C		John Mahnken	6 ft 8 in (2.03 m)	220 lb (100 kg)	1922-06-16	Georgetown
F/C		Al Negratti	6 ft 3 in (1.91 m)	200 lb (91 kg)	1921-06-12	Seton Hall
G		Buddy O'Grady	5 ft 11 in (1.80 m)	160 lb (73 kg)	1920-01-19	Georgetown
F		Delbert Rice	6 ft 2 in (1.88 m)	190 lb (86 kg)	1922-10-27	Portsmouth HS (OH)
F		Tommy Rich	6 ft 3 in (1.91 m)	185 lb (84 kg)	1916-04-26	Cornell
G		Bernard Voorheis	5 ft 10 in (1.78 m)	150 lb (68 kg)	1922-05-23	Cornell

Coaches
Head coach

Eddie Malanowicz &
Les Harrison

Legend
- (DP) Unsigned draft pick
- (FA) Free agent
- (S) Suspended
- Injured

Roster

Note: Chuck Connors, Buddy O'Grady, Delbert Rice, and Tommy Rich were not a part of the playoff roster this season for one reason or another.

== Season standings ==
=== NBL Schedule ===
Not to be confused with exhibition or other non-NBL scheduled games that did not count towards Rochester's official NBL record for this season. An official database created by John Grasso detailing every NBL match possible (outside of two matches that the Kankakee Gallagher Trojans won over the Dayton Metropolitans in 1938) would be released in 2026 showcasing every team's official schedules throughout their time spent in the NBL. As such, these are the official results recorded for the Rochester Royals during their first ever season in the NBL.

#	Date	Opponent	Score	Record
1	November 24	Sheboygan	53–52	1–0
2	December 1	Cleveland	60–49	2–0
3	December 2	@ Fort Wayne	56–54	3–0
4	December 3	@ Youngstown	48–40	4–0
5	December 8	Youngstown	61–47	5–0
6	December 9	@ Cleveland	65–45	6–0
7	December 18	Sheboygan	61–49	7–0
8	December 25	@ Cleveland	60–48	8–0
9	December 29	Fort Wayne	59–63	8–1
10	January 5	Youngstown	70–27	9–1
11	January 12	Chicago	63–32	10–1
12	January 13	@ Cleveland	59–48	11–1
13	January 14	@ Youngstown	58–50	12–1
14	January 19	@ Fort Wayne	61–43	13–1
15	January 20	Fort Wayne	53–58	13–2
16	January 22	Oshkosh	64–55	14–2
17	January 24	@ Sheboygan	41–52	14–3
18	January 25	@ Chicago	48–53	14–4
19	January 26	@ Oshkosh	45–52	14–5
20	February 2	Cleveland	59–49	15–5
21	February 3	@ Indianapolis	36–47	15–6
22	February 4	@ Youngstown	50–47	16–6
23	February 9	Indianapolis	65–57	17–6
24	February 10	Indianapolis	49–56	17–7
25	February 12	@ Cleveland	55–47	18–7
26	February 17	Fort Wayne	58–55	19–7
27	February 19	@ Fort Wayne	64–59	20–7
28	February 23	Chicago	68–56	21–7
29	February 26	Oshkosh	50–58	21–8
30	February 28	@ Sheboygan	35–59	21–9
31	March 1	@ Chicago	51–58	21–10
32	March 2	@ Oshkosh	64–62	22–10
33	March 4	@ Indianapolis	72–52	23–10
34	March 9	Youngstown	70–47	24–10

=== Eastern Division ===
Pos.	Eastern Division	Wins	Losses	Win %
1	Fort Wayne Zollner Pistons	26	8	.765
2	Rochester Royals	24	10	.706
3	Youngstown Bears	13	20	.394
4	Cleveland Allmen Transfers	4	29	.121

=== Western Division ===
Pos.	Western Division	Wins	Losses	Win %
1	Sheboygan Red Skins	21	13	.618
2	Oshkosh All-Stars	19	15	.559
3	Chicago American Gears	17	17	.500
4	Indianapolis Kautskys	10	22	.313

== NBL Playoffs ==
=== NBL Eastern Division Playoff ===
(2E) Rochester Royals vs. (1E) Fort Wayne Zollner Pistons: Rochester wins series 3–1

- Game 1: March 12, 1946 @ Fort Wayne: Fort Wayne 54, Rochester 44
- Game 2: March 13, 1946 @ Fort Wayne: Rochester 58, Fort Wayne 52
- Game 3: March 15, 1946 @ Rochester: Rochester 58, Fort Wayne 52
- Game 4: March 16, 1946 @ Rochester: Rochester 70, Fort Wayne 54

=== NBL Championship ===
(2E) Rochester Royals vs. (1W) Sheboygan Red Skins: Rochester wins series 3–0

- Game 1: March 19, 1946 @ Rochester: Rochester 60, Sheboygan 50
- Game 1: March 21, 1946 @ Rochester: Rochester 61, Sheboygan 54
- Game 1: March 24, 1946 @ Sheboygan: Rochester 66, Sheboygan 48

== Statistics ==
=== Regular season ===
Rk	Player	Position	Games played	Field goals Per Game	Free Throws Per Game	Free Throws Attempted Per Game	Points Per Game
1	George Glamack	C-F	34	4.4	3.4	5.4	12.3
2	Red Holzman	G	34	4.2	2.3	3.4	10.7
3	Al Cervi	G-F	28	4.0	2.7	3.9	10.7
4	Bob Davies	G-F	27	3.2	2.6	3.8	9.0
5	Otto Graham	F-G	32	1.8	1.5	2.3	5.2
6	John Mahnken	C	16	3.1	1.4	2.4	7.7
7	Andrew Levane	F-G	22	2.4	0.4	0.9	5.1
8	Al Negratti	F-C	16	1.2	0.6	—	3.0
9	Tommy Rich	F	17	1.1	0.5	—	2.6
10	Jack Garfinkel	G	18	0.8	0.3	—	1.9
11	Bob Fitzgerald	F-C	10	0.9	1.5	—	3.3
12	Chuck Connors	F-C	14	0.8	0.4	—	2.0
13	Delbert Rice	F	11	0.7	0.5	—	2.0
14	Buddy O'Grady	G	1	0.0	0.0	—	0.0
15	Bernard Voorheis	G	8	0.0	0.0	—	0.0

=== NBL Playoffs ===
Rk	Player	Position	Games played	Field goals Per Game	Free Throws Per Game	Free Throws Attempted Per Game	Points Per Game
1	George Glamack	C-F	7	4.9	2.9	3.9	12.6
2	Bob Davies	G-F	7	4.0	4.3	5.9	12.3
3	Red Holzman	G	7	4.3	3.0	4.4	11.6
4	Al Cervi	G-F	7	3.3	3.4	4.3	10.0
5	John Mahnken	C	7	2.7	1.1	1.3	6.6
6	Al Negratti	F-C	7	1.3	1.0	2.0	3.6
7	Bob Fitzgerald	F-C	6	0.3	1.0	1.7	1.7
8	Otto Graham	F-G	5	0.6	0.0	—	1.2
9	Jack Garfinkel	G	6	0.2	0.2	0.3	0.5
10	Andrew Levane	F-G	3	0.0	0.7	0.7	0.7
11	Bernard Voorheis	G	1	0.0	0.0	—	0.0

== Awards and records ==
- NBL Coach(es) of the Year: Les Harrison and Eddie Malanowicz
- NBL Rookie of the Year: Red Holzman
- All-NBL First Team: George Glamack and Red Holzman
- All-NBL Second Team: Al Cervi
- All-Time NBL Team – Al Cervi, Bob Davies, and George Glamack
