= 1945–46 National Basketball League (United States) season =

1945–46 NBL season
- League: National Basketball League
- Sport: Basketball
- Duration: November 22, 1945 – March 11, 1946; March 12–17, 1946 (Playoffs); March 19–24, 1946 (Finals)
- Games: 32-34
- Teams: 8

Regular season
- Season champions: Fort Wayne Zollner Pistons
- Top seed: Fort Wayne Zollner Pistons
- Season MVP: Bobby McDermott (Fort Wayne)
- Top scorer: Bob Carpenter (Oshkosh)

Playoffs
- Eastern champions: Rochester Royals
- Eastern runners-up: Fort Wayne Zollner Pistons
- Western champions: Sheboygan Red Skins
- Western runners-up: Oshkosh All-Stars

Finals
- Venue: Edgerton Park Arena, Rochester, New York; Sheboygan Armory, Sheboygan, Wisconsin
- Champions: Rochester Royals
- Runners-up: Sheboygan Red Skins

NBL seasons
- ← 1944–45 1946–47 →

The 1945–46 NBL season was the eleventh overall season for the U.S.A.'s National Basketball League (NBL) and its ninth season under that name after previously going by the Midwest Basketball Conference in its first two seasons of existence. Due to the conclusion of World War II, the NBL would see itself get into its highest number of teams in a season yet since the 1939–40 NBL season with eight teams competing against each other throughout the season, which would be double the number of teams used from the 1943–44 NBL season and most of the 1942–43 NBL season. The regular season began on November 22, 1945, and ran until March 11, 1946. The playoffs began on March 12, 1946, and concluded on March 24, 1946, with the newly added Rochester Royals winning their first ever championship by sweeping the Sheboygan Red Skins 3 games to 0 in the NBL Championship series.

== Notable events ==
Entering this season, the NBL would see itself get back to the highest number of teams it had since the 1939–40 NBL season, with it seeing eight teams competing in the league due to not just the Indianapolis Kautskys returning to the NBL following World War II's conclusion, but also seeing the Rochester Royals and Youngstown Bears joining the NBL as well, with the latter team once being misattributed as the same Pittsburgh Raiders team from the previous season being moved to Youngstown, Ohio when the Raiders dropped out of the NBL (once again) for this season. As a result of the increasing number of teams following the conclusion of World War II, the NBL allowed for each team to play a total of 32-34 scheduled NBL games for their respective seasons. Because of the return of the divisional formatting in the NBL, the NBL Playoffs this season would see the two best teams in each division in the NBL, with the NBL's championship series ending with the newly established Rochester Royals upsetting the Sheboygan Red Skins three games to none in a best of five series. Similar to the Fort Wayne Zollner Pistons currently existing in the present day as the Detroit Pistons in the NBA, the Rochester Royals also currently exist in the present day under a new team name as well through the Sacramento Kings in the NBA themselves.

Eastern Division	Cleveland Allmen Transfers Cleveland, Ohio	Fort Wayne Zollner Pistons Fort Wayne, Indiana
Eastern Division	Rochester Royals Rochester, New York	Youngstown Bears Youngstown, Ohio
Western Division	Chicago American Gears Chicago, Illinois	Indianapolis Kautskys Indianapolis, Indiana
Western Division	Oshkosh All-Stars Oshkosh, Wisconsin	Sheboygan Red Skins Sheboygan, Wisconsin

Coaching changes
Offseason
Team	1944–45 coach	1945–46 coach
Fort Wayne Zollner Pistons	Bobby McDermott (player-coach)	Carl Bennett

== Regular season ==
The regular season featured a 34-game schedule, where each team would have play every team in their division six times (with three games being at home and three games going on the road) and each team in the opposing division would have been played four times (with two games played at home and two games going on the road) instead. However, due to various delays within the season that never got properly resolved, both the Cleveland Allmen Transfers and Youngstown Bears would play only 33 games this season, while the (once again) recently returning Indianapolis Kautskys would only play in 32 games this season.

=== Final standings ===
Pos.	Eastern Division	Wins	Losses	Win %
1	Fort Wayne Zollner Pistons	26	8	.765
2	Rochester Royals	24	10	.706
3	Youngstown Bears	13	20	.394
4	Cleveland Allmen Transfers	4	29	.121

Pos.	Western Division	Wins	Losses	Win %
1	Sheboygan Red Skins	21	13	.618
2	Oshkosh All-Stars	19	15	.559
3	Chicago American Gears	17	17	.500
4	Indianapolis Kautskys	10	22	.313

== Playoffs ==
For the second straight season in a row, following the return of divisional implementation within the NBL, the formatting of the NBL Playoffs for this season would return to the format used in the previous season's NBL Playoffs with the two best teams in each division competing against each other first before the remaining two teams from each series would compete against each other for the championship round in another best of five series, similar to the previous year's championship series. The two best teams in the Eastern Division were the Fort Wayne Zollner Pistons, who were a works team that were also the previous season's champions, and the Rochester Royals, while the two best teams in the Western Division represented the state of Wisconsin with cityside rivals in the Sheboygan Red Skins and the Oshkosh All-Stars competing against each other for the fifth time in their NBL playoff history.

The Eastern Division would see quite a surprise go down with the new Rochester Royals squad surprisingly upsetting the Fort Wayne Zollner Pistons in a 3–1 series win, while the Sheboygan Red Skins would get the tiebreaking series win between the two Wisconsin-based teams with a close 3–2 series win resulting in Sheboygan having a chance to get their second NBL championship against a newer team that joined the NBL out in Rochester, New York. Unfortunately for the Red Skins, the Royals would end up sweeping Sheboygan with a 3–0 series sweep, thus making the Rochester Royals become champions of the league under their first official professional basketball season ever played after previously existing as an independent team from as far back as 1923. This would also later be their only championship won in the NBL, as following a 1951 NBA Finals championship victory while still using the Rochester Royals name, the new NBL champions would fail to get another championship to their franchise's name as of 2025 after eventually becoming the present-day Sacramento Kings.

Division Playoffs
E1	Fort Wayne Zollner Pistons	1
E2	Rochester Royals	3
W1	Sheboygan Red Skins	3
W2	Oshkosh All-Stars	2

NBL Championship
E2	Rochester Royals	3
W1	Sheboygan Red Skins	0

- Bold Series winner

== Statistical leaders ==
Category	Player	Team	Stat
Points	Bob Carpenter	Oshkosh All-Stars	473
Free-Throws	Leroy Edwards	Oshkosh All-Stars	119
Field goals	Bob Carpenter	Oshkosh All-Stars	186

Note: Prior to the 1969–70 NBA season, league leaders in points were determined by totals rather than averages. Also, rebounding and assist numbers were not recorded properly in the NBL like they would be in the BAA/NBA, as would field goal and free-throw shooting percentages.

== NBL awards ==
- NBL Most Valuable Player: Bobby McDermott, Fort Wayne Zollner Pistons
- NBL Coach of the Year: Eddie Malanowicz, Rochester Royals
- NBL Rookie of the Year: Red Holzman, Rochester Royals
- All-NBL First Team:
  - F/C – Bob Carpenter, Oshkosh All-Stars
  - F/C – George Glamack, Rochester Royals
  - C – Ed Dancker, Sheboygan Red Skins
  - G – Buddy Jeannette, Fort Wayne Zollner Pistons
  - G – Bobby McDermott, Fort Wayne Zollner Pistons
  - G – Red Holzman, Rochester Royals
- All-NBL Second Team:
  - G/F – Al Cervi, Rochester Royals
  - F/G – Bob Calihan, Chicago American Gears
  - C/F – Leroy Edwards, Oshkosh All-Stars
  - C – Mike Novak, Sheboygan Red Skins
  - G – Frank Baumholtz, Youngstown Bears
  - G – Jerry Steiner, Indianapolis Kautskys

For reasons unknown, the 1945–46 NBL season would join the 1940–41 NBL season as the only two NBL seasons to have both the All-NBL First and Second Teams to list out a total of six different players instead of the usual five, as had been intended for most other NBL seasons.

== World Professional Basketball Tournament ==
For the eighth World Professional Basketball Tournament ever hosted, it would feature a total of fourteen teams competing in the event held in Chicago on March 25–April 8, 1946, with most of the teams competing being seven independently ran teams going up against six of the eight NBL teams that entered the event alongside the original Baltimore Bullets team that was recently dubbed the newly crowned champions of the rivaling American Basketball League.

It also became the only WPBT event to have both the championship series and third place series be held in a best of three series instead of a winner-takes-all single game format like it was done in every other WPBT ever held. In any case, of the NBL teams competing in this specific event, the local home team of the event in the Chicago American Gears would defeat the former Pittsburgh Raiders NBL team with a 69–56 victory, the Cleveland Allmen Transfers would end up seeing their leave from professional basketball entirely with a 59–46 loss to the Anderson Chiefs works team, the Indianapolis Kautskys would continue to see their WPBT drought extend to another year with a 72–59 loss to the independently ran Midland Dow Chemicals works team owned and operated by the Dow Chemical Company, and the Oshkosh All-Stars would crush the Detroit Mansfields with a 60–32 blowout win to enter the first round that was held on March 25 and 27. As for the quarterfinals held on March 29, the Oshkosh All-Stars would upset the all-black New York Renaissance with a 50–44 victory, the local Chicago American Gears barely survived against the Sheboygan Red Skins with a 52–51 upset victory in their favor, and the two-time defending WPBT champion Fort Wayne Zollner Pistons barely survived against the Midland Dow Chemicals works team with a 65–62 victory in their favor.

Entering the semifinals held on April 3, Fort Wayne would once again barely survive their opposing rival, this time being the ABL's Baltimore Bullets, with a close 50–49 victory while the Oshkosh All-Stars would utilize the necessary tricks of fouling out key Chicago American Gears players George Mikan and Dick Triptow during the second half to help ensure that Oshkosh would upset the local Chicago team with a 72–66 victory to ensure that the All-Stars would go up against the Zollner Pistons in the championship series and the Chicago American Gears went up against the ABL's Baltimore Bullets in a best-of-three third-place finish. For third place, Chicago would sweep the ABL's Baltimore Bullets 2–0 by first beating them in a close-looking 59–54 bout on April 5 before finishing them for good a day later with a 65–50 beatdown to win the third place series.

As for the championship series, if it were like any other series, the Oshkosh All-Stars would have been deemed the victors on April 5 due to them winning a close 61–59 match over the Fort Wayne Zollner Pistons; however, because of the best-of-three formatting for this particular event, Fort Wayne would bounce back the following night to win 56–47 before concluding with a beatdown on Oshkosh with a 73–57 victory to give the Zollner Pistons a 2–1 series win for their third straight WPBT championship. Despite them being three-time WPBT champions, however, none of Fort Wayne's or even Oshkosh's players would win the WPBT's MVP award, as it would go to Chicago American Gears center George Mikan.

== See also ==
- National Basketball League (United States)
