= 1945–46 Fort Wayne Zollner Pistons season =

Fifth season of the Pistons in the NBL

- Division champions
- Head coach: Carl Bennett
- Owner: Fred Zollner
- Arena: North Side High School Gym, Fort Wayne, Indiana

Results
- Record: 26–8 (.765)
- Place: Division: 1st (Eastern)
- Playoff finish: Lost Eastern Division Playoff to Rochester Royals, 3-1
- Stats at Basketball Reference

The 1945–46 Fort Wayne Zollner Pistons season was the fifth season of the franchise playing in the National Basketball League. The team was looking to return to the NBL Finals for a fifth consecutive year and win their third straight title. They once again claimed the best regular season record by winning 26 games this season, with Bobby McDermott being awarded his fourth and final NBL MVP Award. Both Bobby McDermott and Buddy Jeannette were named to the All-NBL First Team as well. Entering the NBL Playoffs, Fort Wayne met the newly registered Rochester Royals (who technically existed as an independent semi-pro franchise since 1923 under multiple different names) in the first round under what was deemed the Eastern Division Playoff, but were upset by the new, eventual champions in four games (which the team claimed was due to them scheduling and playing in too many exhibition games against random teams like the Midland Dow Chemicals, the Philadelphia Sphas from the rivaling American Basketball League, and even the Chicago Collegians for their own good this season, to the point of leaving nothing left for the playoffs this time around), making it the first season in franchise history where they failed to even reach the NBL Finals. This season later marked the official end of the Zollner Pistons' NBL dominance, as both Jeannette and McDermott later left the franchise within the following year, with Jeannette joining the (original) Baltimore Bullets team in the rivaling American Basketball League and five-time NBL MVP McDermott later leaving during the following season of play due to a team dispute near the end of the year to join up with the Chicago American Gears instead.

Despite failing to repeat as champions in the NBL, Fort Wayne would still be invited into the World Professional Basketball Tournament as well. This event didn't see them have a rematch against the Royals since Rochester declined their entry for the 1946 event due to disputed disagreements involving payment. However, they did compete against the independently ran Midland Dow Chemicals and the American Basketball League's Baltimore Bullets before competing against the NBL's Oshkosh All-Stars in the only year the WPBT implemented a best-of-three tournament set-up for the championship match and third place consolation prize match. The experimental switch-up would prove to be favorable for Fort Wayne, as the Zollner Pistons won the event two games to one (losing the first game 61–59, which would have given Oshkosh the WPBT championship in any other year, before Fort Wayne won 56–47 and 73–57 in the matches after that one) to claim a three-peat in the WPBT.

== Roster ==
1945–46 Fort Wayne Zollner Pistons roster
Players

Pos.	No.	Player	Height	Weight	DOB	From
G/F	20	Curly Armstrong	5 ft 11 in (1.80 m)	170 lb (77 kg)	1918-11-01	Indiana
F/C	23	Jerry Bush	6 ft 3 in (1.91 m)	200 lb (91 kg)	1914-09-06	St. John's
F		Gus Doerner	6 ft 2 in (1.88 m)	190 lb (86 kg)	1922-02-27	Evansville
G	26	Buddy Jeannette	5 ft 11 in (1.80 m)	175 lb (79 kg)	1917-09-15	Washington & Jefferson
F/C	44	Bob Kinney	6 ft 6 in (1.98 m)	215 lb (98 kg)	1920-09-16	Rice
G	24	Bobby McDermott	5 ft 11 in (1.80 m)	180 lb (82 kg)	1914-01-07	Flushing HS (NY)
F/C	22	Jake Pelkington	6 ft 6 in (1.98 m)	220 lb (100 kg)	1916-01-03	Manhattan
G/F	27	Chick Reiser	5 ft 11 in (1.80 m)	165 lb (75 kg)	1914-12-17	NYU
C	33	Ed Sadowski	6 ft 5 in (1.96 m)	240 lb (109 kg)	1915-07-11	Seton Hall
G/F		Herm Schaefer	6 ft 0 in (1.83 m)	175 lb (79 kg)	1919-12-20	Indiana
G/F	25	Charley Shipp	6 ft 1 in (1.85 m)	200 lb (91 kg)	1913-12-03	Catholic
F/C		Bob Synnott	6 ft 3 in (1.91 m)	190 lb (86 kg)	1912-09-27	Theodore Roosevelt HS (NY)
G/F	29	Bob Tough	6 ft 0 in (1.83 m)	185 lb (84 kg)	1920-08-28	St. John's

Coaches
Head coach

Carl Bennett

Legend
- (DP) Unsigned draft pick
- (FA) Free agent
- (S) Suspended
- Injured

Roster

Note: Gus Doerner, Herm Schaefer, and Bob Synnott were not a part of the playoff roster for this season for one reason or another.

== Regular season ==
=== NBL Schedule ===
Not to be confused with exhibition or other non-NBL scheduled games that did not count towards Fort Wayne's official NBL record for this season. An official database created by John Grasso detailing every NBL match possible (outside of two matches that the Kankakee Gallagher Trojans won over the Dayton Metropolitans in 1938) would be released in 2026 showcasing every team's official schedules throughout their time spent in the NBL. As such, these are the official results recorded for the Fort Wayne Zollner Pistons during their fifth season in the NBL.

#	Date	Opponent	Score	Record
1	December 2	Rochester	54–56	0–1
2	December 7	@ Chicago	60–51	1–1
3	December 9	Sheboygan	70–52	2–1
4	December 10	@ Youngstown	71–52	3–1
5	December 13	@ Sheboygan	54–57 (2OT)	3–2
6	December 15	@ Oshkosh	58–48	4–2
7	December 16	Youngstown	74–59	5–2
8	December 22	@ Cleveland	75–41	6–2
9	December 23	Oshkosh	53–44	7–2
10	December 29	@ Rochester	63–59	8–2
11	December 30	Youngstown	60–44	9–2
12	January 6	Indianapolis	49–46	10–2
13	January 8	Cleveland	68–49	11–2
14	January 9	@ Indianapolis	60–47	12–2
15	January 12	@ Oshkosh	46–45	13–2
16	January 13	Chicago	71–43	14–2
17	January 19	Rochester	43–61	14–3
18	January 20	@ Rochester	58–53	15–3
19	January 29	Cleveland	61–48	16–3
20	January 31	@ Youngstown	57–60	16–4
21	February 1	@ Chicago	48–43	17–4
22	February 2	@ Cleveland	56–42	18–4
23	February 5	Oshkosh	68–59	19–4
24	February 7	@ Indianapolis	43–39	20–4
25	February 10	Cleveland	48–36	21–4
26	February 12	Indianapolis	72–55	22–4
27	February 14	@ Sheboygan	63–50	23–4
28	February 17	@ Rochester	55–58	23–5
29	February 19	Rochester	59–64	23–6
30	February 24	Youngstown	59–54	24–6
31	March 2	@ Cleveland	61–52	25–6
32	March 3	Sheboygan	53–49	26–6
33	March 6	@ Youngstown	60–62	26–7
34	March 10	Chicago	47–55	26–8

=== Eastern Division Standings ===
Pos.	Eastern Division	Wins	Losses	Win %
1	Fort Wayne Zollner Pistons	26	8	.765
2	Rochester Royals	24	10	.706
3	Youngstown Bears	13	20	.394
4	Cleveland Allmen Transfers	4	29	.121

=== Western Division Standings ===
Pos.	Western Division	Wins	Losses	Win %
1	Sheboygan Red Skins	21	13	.618
2	Oshkosh All-Stars	19	15	.559
3	Chicago American Gears	17	17	.500
4	Indianapolis Kautskys	10	22	.313

== NBL Playoffs ==
=== NBL Eastern Division Playoff ===
(1E) Fort Wayne Zollner Pistons vs. (2E) Rochester Royals: Rochester wins series 3–1

- Game 1: March 12, 1946 @ Fort Wayne: Fort Wayne 54, Rochester 44
- Game 2: March 13, 1946 @ Fort Wayne: Rochester 58, Fort Wayne 52
- Game 3: March 15, 1946 @ Rochester: Rochester 58, Fort Wayne 52
- Game 4: March 16, 1946 @ Rochester: Rochester 70, Fort Wayne 54

=== Awards and honors ===
- NBL Most Valuable Player – Bobby McDermott (Would be his fifth and final NBL MVP award won by him, all while with the Fort Wayne Zollner Pistons.)
- First Team All-NBL – Bobby McDermott and Buddy Jeannette
- All-Time NBL Team – Bobby McDermott, Buddy Jeannette, Jerry Bush, and Charley Shipp

== World Professional Basketball Tournament ==
For the sixth year in a row (fifth in a row while representing the NBL), the Fort Wayne Zollner Pistons would participate in the annual World Professional Basketball Tournament in Chicago, which the 1946 event was held on March 25–April 8, 1946 and consisted mostly of independently ran teams and six of the eight NBL teams (missing the Youngstown Bears and the new NBL champion Rochester Royals) alongside the American Basketball League's champion team, the Baltimore Bullets. The Zollner Pistons joined the Sheboygan Red Skins as the only teams to have a first round bye due to them having the best records in their divisions in the NBL (with the Zollner Pistons also getting their bye due to their back-to-back champion status in the WPBT as well). As such, Fort Wayne's first round match was against the independently ran Midland Dow Chemicals works team (which involved players that were working at the Dow Chemical Company in Midland, Michigan), who beat the NBL's Indianapolis Kautskys 72–59 in the first round. While the Zollner Pistons kept things dangerously close with the Dow Chemicals, the ultimately beat Midland 65–62 in the quarterfinal round.

In the semifinal round, Fort Wayne saw themselves go up against the American Basketball League's champion team, the Baltimore Bullets, for the first time in franchise history. Much like their first match against Midland, the Zollner Pistons kept things dangerously close with the Bullets, though they still ended up surviving against Baltimore 50–49 in the semifinal round. The Bullets and Pistons would eventually meet again in the Basketball Association of America and National Basketball Association as regular teams there from 1948 until 1954.

For the championship round, the Zollner Pistons would see their opponent be an NBL team for a change of pace in the Oshkosh All-Stars (who previously lost to Sheboygan in the NBL Playoffs, but were eliminated by the Chicago American Gears in the quarterfinal round, with Oshkosh upsetting Chicago in the semifinal round due in part to them fouling out star center George Mikan in the second half). In the first game of the series played on April 5, 1946, Oshkosh had routed the Zollner Pistons in the first half of the game; while Fort Wayne fought hard to catch up in the second half, their efforts were not enough, as they would lose to the All-Stars 61–59, which would have granted Oshkosh the WPBT's championship in any other year. Instead, with Fort Wayne having their backs against the wall in Game 2, the Zollner Pistons fought back in a more serious manner in the following night's match, winning both halves of the game to win 56–47 to tie the series up. With the series tied up and both teams rested up for the final night on April 8, the final match saw the Zollner Pistons route the All-Stars even worse in Game 3 than they did in Game 2, which led to Fort Wayne winning 73–57 to gain their third and final WPBT championship in a row. Despite Jerry Bush and Bobby McDermott being named members of the All-Tournament First Team, neither of them were named the MVP of the event, with center George Mikan of the Chicago American Gears being named the MVP of the event. Ironically, it wasn't the first time a champion team didn't have an MVP there, as 1943 saw the Zollner Pistons' own Curly Armstrong winning the MVP award that year despite the independent, all-black Washington Bears being named the champions for the WPBT that year.

=== Scores ===
- Fort Wayne had a bye in the first round.
- Won quarterfinal round (65–62) over the Midland Dow Chemicals
- Won semifinal round (50–49) over the Baltimore Bullets
- Won championship series (2–1) over the Oshkosh All-Stars
  - Lost April 5, 1946 championship series match (59–61) to the Oshkosh All-Stars
  - Won April 6, 1946 championship series match (56–47) over the Oshkosh All-Stars
  - Won April 8, 1946 championship series match (73–57) over the Oshkosh All-Stars

=== Awards and honors ===
- Jerry Bush, All-Tournament First Team
- Bobby McDermott, All-Tournament First Team
