= 1945–46 Cleveland Allmen Transfers season =

NBL professional basketball team season

- Head coach: Joseph J. Carlin
- Owner(s): Allmen Transfer & Moving Company
- Arena: Public Auditorium

Results
- Record: 4–29 (.121)
- Place: Division: 4th (Eastern)
- Playoff finish: Did not qualify

The 1945–46 Cleveland Allmen Transfers season was the third and final professional season and second and final season of the Allmen Transfers playing in the United States' National Basketball League (NBL), which would also be the ninth year the NBL itself existed. However, if one were to count the seasons where they played as the Cleveland Chase Copper Brass team in the Amateur Athletic Union starting as early as 1935 back when the NBL technically first began as the Midwest Basketball Conference as well as their only NBL season when they played as the Cleveland Chase Brassmen and their first season when using the Cleveland Allmen Transfers, then this would officially be their eleventh and final season of overall play. Due to the additions of the Rochester Royals and Youngstown Bears alongside the reacquisition of the Indianapolis Kautskys following the end of World War II in exchange for the removal of the Pittsburgh Raiders in their brief return to the NBL (specifically for the Bears in this case), the league entered this season at their strongest point since the pre-World War II era with eight teams competing against each other with four teams in both the Eastern Division (which the Allmen Transfers were a part of) and the Western Division. Unfortunately for the Cleveland franchise, that would not mean a newfound sense of success, as they would only produce one more victory than they had in their only season under the Chase Brassmen name and had the highest amount of losses recorded in a season by that point in time with 29 total defeats in what would become their worst season in franchise history (which was caused, in part, due to star player Mel Riebe only having a limited presence this season with him serving in the military during this season). Following the conclusion of this season, the Allmen Transfers folded operations entirely, with their spot in the NBL (and only that team's spot in the NBL) being bought out by the Syracuse Nationals (now known as the Philadelphia 76ers in the NBA) before the final three seasons of the NBL began. (Contrary to one stated notion involving the franchise, the Allmen Transfers and their potentially complex team history that might have also involved both the Chicago Bruins and the Chicago Studebaker Flyers alongside the aforementioned Cleveland Chase Brassmen would not be acquired by the Syracuse Nationals, as Syracuse's team owners in Danny Biasone and George Mingin paid $2,500 for the Allmen Transfers' placement in the NBL, but let all of Cleveland's players enter free agency, essentially making it a new NBL team in its own nature that season.)

== Roster ==
Please note that due to the way records for professional basketball leagues like the NBL and the ABL were recorded at the time, some information on both teams and players may be harder to list out than usual here.

Player	Position
Bruce Boehler	G
Marshall Brown	F
Mike Bytzura	F
Ned Endress	G-F
Herm Fuetsch	G
Johnny Malokas	G
Paul McCall	F
Howie McCarty	G-F
John Mills	C
John Moir	F
Jack Oberst	F
Bill Riebe	G
Mel Riebe	G-F
George Rung	G
Joe Scott	F-C
Bob Shaw	F-C
Paul Widowitz	F
Tom Wukovits	G

In addition to them, the roster would also feature the return of Wee Willie Smith from the original Cleveland Chase Brassmen team for the 1946 World Professional Basketball Tournament.

== Regular season ==
=== Season standings ===
Pos.	Eastern Division	Wins	Losses	Win %
1	Fort Wayne Zollner Pistons	26	8	.765
2	Rochester Royals	24	10	.706
3	Youngstown Bears	13	20	.394
4	Cleveland Allmen Transfers	4	29	.121

=== NBL Schedule ===
An official database created by John Grasso detailing every NBL match possible (outside of two matches that the Kankakee Gallagher Trojans won over the Dayton Metropolitans in 1938) would be released in 2026 showcasing every team's official schedules throughout their time spent in the NBL. As such, these are the official results recorded for the Cleveland Allmen Transfers during their third and final season in the NBL and their second and final NBL season under that specific team name.

- November 25, 1945 @ Indianapolis, IN: Cleveland Allmen Transfers 51, Indianapolis Kautskys 44
- December 1, 1945 @ Rochester, NY: Cleveland Allmen Transfers 49, Rochester Royals 60
- December 2, 1945 @ Cleveland, OH: Youngstown Bears 32, Cleveland Allmen Transfers 33
- December 9, 1945 @ Cleveland, OH: Rochester Royals 65, Cleveland Allmen Transfers 45
- December 16, 1945 @ Cleveland, OH: Sheboygan Red Skins 51, Cleveland Allmen Transfers 48
- December 22, 1945 @ Cleveland, OH: Fort Wayne Zollner Pistons 75, Cleveland Allmen Transfers 41
- December 25, 1945 @ Rochester, NY: Cleveland Allmen Transfers 48, Rochester Royals 50
- December 31, 1945 @ Youngstown, OH: Cleveland Allmen Transfers 35, Youngstown Bears 43
- January 1, 1946 @ Cleveland, OH: Indianapolis Kautskys 55, Cleveland Allmen Transfers 54
- January 6, 1946 @ Cleveland, OH: Youngstown Bears 58, Cleveland Allmen Transfers 51
- January 8, 1946 @ Fort Wayne, IN: Cleveland Allmen Transfers 49, Fort Wayne Zollner Pistons 68
- January 9, 1946 @ Chicago, IL: Cleveland Allmen Transfers 48, Chicago American Gears 59
- January 10, 1946 @ Sheboygan, WI: Cleveland Allmen Transfers 53, Sheboygan Red Skins 78
- January 13, 1946 @ Cleveland, OH: Rochester Royals 59, Cleveland Allmen Transfers 48
- January 19, 1946 @ Cleveland, OH: Sheboygan Red Skins 51, Cleveland Allmen Transfers 42
- January 20, 1946 @ Indianapolis, IN: Cleveland Allmen Transfers 33, Indianapolis Kautskys 49
- January 21, 1946 @ Youngstown, OH: Fort Wayne Zollner Pistons 73, Cleveland Allmen Transfers 58
- January 23, 1946 @ Fort Wayne, IN: Cleveland Allmen Transfers 38, Youngstown Bears 45
- January 27, 1946 @ Cleveland, OH: Chicago American Gears 35, Cleveland Allmen Transfers 60
- January 29, 1946 @ Fort Wayne, IN: Cleveland Allmen Transfers 48, Fort Wayne Zollner Pistons 61
- February 2, 1946 @ Rochester, NY: Cleveland Allmen Transfers 49, Rochester Royals 59
- February 3, 1946 @ Cleveland, OH: 'Fort Wayne Zollner Pistons 56, Cleveland Allmen Transfers 42
- February 4, 1946 @ Cleveland, OH: Oshkosh All-Stars 59, Cleveland Allmen Transfers 43
- February 8, 1946 @ Oshkosh, WI: Cleveland Allmen Transfers 45, Oshkosh All-Stars 77
- February 10, 1946 @ Fort Wayne, IN: Cleveland Allmen Transfers 36, Fort Wayne Zollner Pistons 48
- February 12, 1946 @ Cleveland, OH: Rochester Royals 55, Cleveland Allmen Transfers 47
- February 17, 1946 @ Cleveland, OH: Youngstown Bears 46, Cleveland Allmen Transfers 50
- February 18, 1946 @ Youngstown, OH: Cleveland Allmen Transfers 38, Youngstown Bears 52
- February 24, 1946 @ Cleveland, OH: Chicago American Gears 51, Cleveland Allmen Transfers 50
- March 2, 1946 @ Cleveland, OH: Fort Wayne Zollner Pistons 61, Cleveland Allmen Transfers 52
- March 6, 1946 @ Cleveland, OH: Oshkosh All-Stars 67, Cleveland Allmen Transfers 59
- March 7, 1946 @ Sheboygan, WI: Cleveland Allmen Transfers 47, Sheboygan Red Skins 67
- March 8, 1946 @ Chicago, IL: Cleveland Allmen Transfers 47, Chicago American Gears 59
- March 9, 1946 @ Oshkosh, WI: Cleveland Allmen Transfers 46, Oshkosh All-Stars 60

One other game that the Cleveland Allmen Transfers had scheduled during the season at home in Cleveland, Ohio, against the Indianapolis Kautskys near/at the end of the season would end up being cancelled as well.

== Awards and honors ==
- Mel Riebe, NBL All-Time Team

== World Professional Basketball Tournament ==
For the second time when using the Allmen Transfers name and third and final time after previously going by the Cleveland Chase Brassmen, the Cleveland Allmen Transfers would enter the annual World Professional Basketball Tournament in Chicago, which the 1946 event was held on March 25–April 8, 1946 and was mostly held by independently ran teams alongside six out of eight NBL teams from this season (only the new NBL champions in the Rochester Royals and the Youngstown Bears declined their entries this year) and the original Baltimore Bullets franchise from the American Basketball League. In the first round, the Allmen Transfers would compete against the Anderson Chiefs (who sometimes were referred to the much longer company-based name of the Chief Anderson Meat Packers), who were an independent works team owned and operated by Duffey's Meat Packing, Incorporated (owned by brothers Ike W. and John B. Duffey) out in Anderson, Indiana. Due to the combined nature of the Allmen Transfers' poor roster talent outside of Mel Riebe (and the brief return of an older Wee Willie Smith) and the unknown nature of the Anderson Chiefs franchise during this period of time, the Anderson Chiefs would easily dispose of the Allmen Transfers with a 61–46 beatdown, ending the franchise's WPBT runs for good. Anderson would later get eliminated in a very close match to the ABL's Baltimore Bullets, who themselves ended up getting eliminated to the eventual three-time WPBT champion Fort Wayne Zollner Pistons (with Baltimore later getting swept by the Chicago American Gears, who held the WPBT MVP that year in center George Mikan, in a 2–0 series); the Anderson Chiefs would later join the NBL as the Anderson Duffey Packers following the removal of the Allmen Transfers franchise (who were replaced by the Syracuse Nationals (now known as the Philadelphia 76ers)), with all three of Anderson, Baltimore, and Fort Wayne (alongside Syracuse/Philadelphia) eventually joining the NBA in later years.

=== Game played ===
- Lost first round (46–59) to the Anderson Chiefs
