= Don Harvey =

Donald or Don Harvey may refer to:

- Don Harvey (actor, born 1911) (1911–1963), American TV and film performer a/k/a Don C. Harvey
- Don Harvey (basketball) (1920–2008), American guard-forward
- Donald P. Harvey (born 1924), U.S. Navy rear admiral and former director of the Office of Naval Intelligence
- Don Harvey (bishop) (born 1939), Canadian Anglican moderator and director
- Donald Harvey (1952–2017), American hospital orderly and serial killer
- Don Harvey (actor, born 1960), American film and TV performer and voice actor
