= Charlie Butler (basketball) =

American basketball player

Personal information
- Born: August 15, 1920 Chicago, Illinois, U.S.
- Died: October 5, 2014 (aged 94) Youngstown, Ohio, U.S.
- Listed height: 6 ft 2 in (1.88 m)
- Listed weight: 165 lb (75 kg)

Career information
- High school: Mount Carmel (Chicago, Illinois)
- College: Notre Dame (1940–1943)
- Position: Guard / forward

Career history
- 1942–1943: Detroit Eagles
- 1943–1944: Chicago Bears
- 1945–1946: Chicago American Gears
- 1946–1947: Youngstown Bears
- 1947: Syracuse Nationals
- 1947–1948: Youngstown
- 1947–1948: Sharon

Charles Joseph Butler (August 15, 1920 – October 5, 2014) was an American professional basketball player. He played for the Chicago American Gears, Youngstown Bears, and Syracuse Nationals in the National Basketball League and averaged 6.4 points per game.

In his post-basketball career, Butler worked for Commercial Shearing and Stamping in Youngstown, Ohio for 35 years before retiring.
