= John Wright (basketball) =

American basketball player

Personal information
- Born: January 8, 1921 Middletown, Indiana, U.S.
- Died: July 24, 2008 (aged 87) Wildwood, Florida, U.S.
- Listed height: 7 ft 1 in (2.16 m)
- Listed weight: 230 lb (104 kg)
- Position: Guard

Career history
- 1944–1945: Paterson Crescents
- 1945: Youngstown Bears
- 1945–1947: Midland Dow A.C.'s

John Thomas "Doc" Wright (January 8, 1921 – July 24, 2008) was an American professional basketball player. He played in the National Basketball League for the Youngstown Bears in two games during the 1945–46 season and averaged 5.5 points per game. Some sources indicate that he played at George Washington University, but GWU's all-time letter winners records do not include him.
