= Calihan Hall =

Arena in Detroit

- Dick Vitale Court
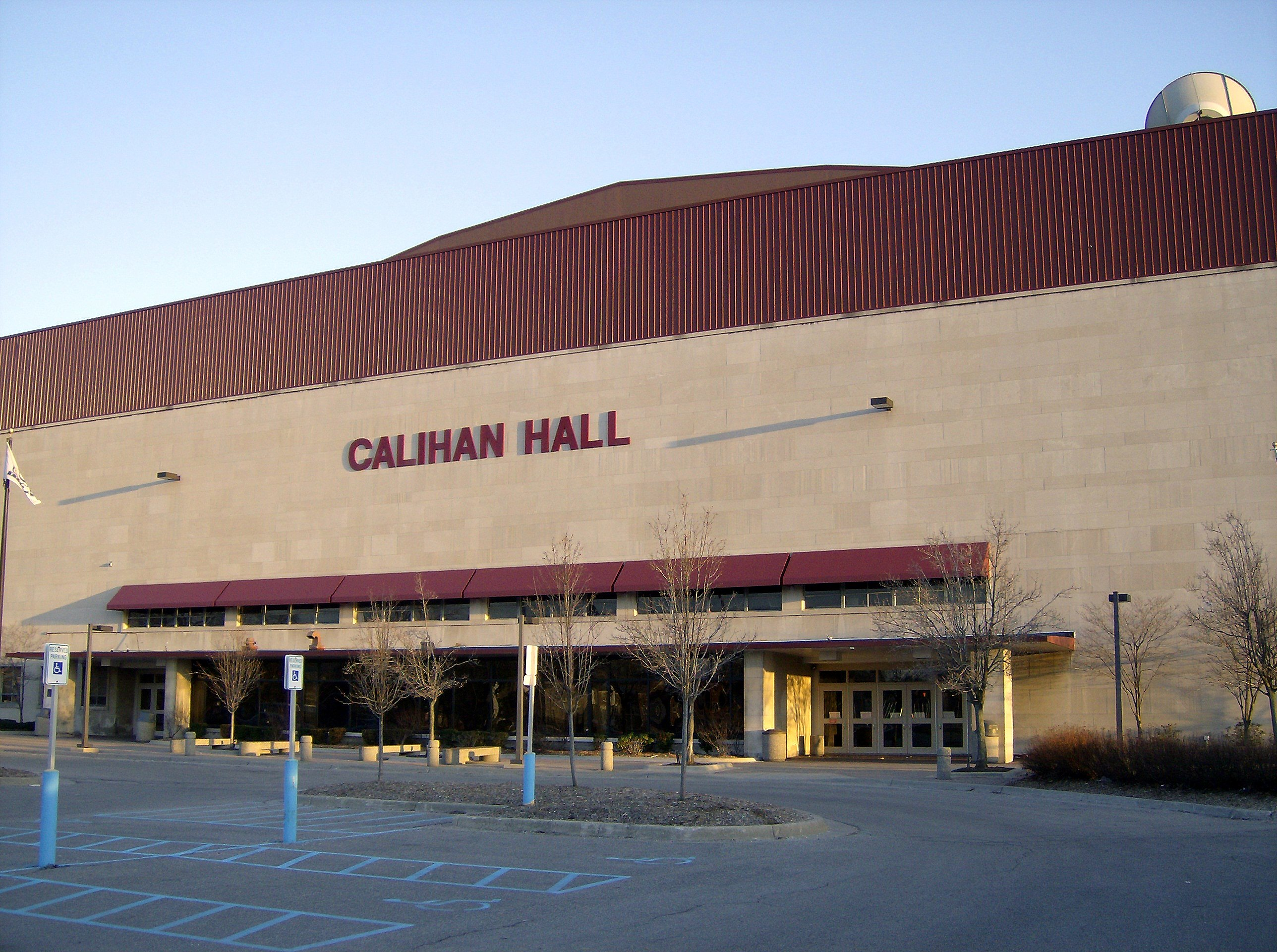
- Interactive map of Calihan Hall
- Former names: Memorial Building (1952–1977)
- Location: 4001 W. McNichols Rd. Detroit, Michigan 48221
- Coordinates: 42°24′51″N 83°8′9″W
- Owner: University of Detroit Mercy
- Operator: University of Detroit Mercy
- Capacity: 7,917
- Surface: Hardwood

Construction
- Opened: May 25, 1952

Tenants
- Detroit Mercy Titans (NCAA) (1952–present); Detroit Pistons (NBA) (1957–1961)

Calihan Hall is a 7,917-seat multi-purpose arena in Detroit. It is home to the University of Detroit Mercy Titans basketball team. The arena opened in 1952. The building was dedicated on May 25, 1952, as the Memorial Building. The first basketball game was played on December 2 of that year when the Titans defeated Kalamazoo College, 75–61. In 1977, the name was changed to Calihan Hall in honor of Bob Calihan, the Titans' first basketball All-American who went on to become the school's winningest coach.

The Detroit Pistons of the National Basketball Association (NBA) played some games in Calihan Hall in the late 1950s.

The Titan Pep Band plays at all men's and women's home basketball games in Calihan Hall.

Capacity at Calihan Hall was listed at over 10,000 in the 1960s and 70s, and standing-room admissions allowed attendance in excess of that figure; since then, limitations ordered by fire marshals and other safety personnel have reduced capacity to the current figure of 7,917.

Detroit Catholic High School League (CHSL) playoff games are regularly held at Calihan Hall, which has also hosted numerous Michigan High School Athletic Association (MHSAA) tournament games.

The University of Michigan hosted the championship game of the 2017 Women's National Invitation Tournament at Calihan Hall due to the unavailability of the Crisler Center, its on-campus home. The Wolverines defeated Georgia Tech 89–79 in three overtimes.

On December 5, 2011, the playing surface was named Dick Vitale Court in honor of longtime ESPN analyst Dick Vitale, who began his head coaching career at the University of Detroit in 1973 and later served as the school's athletic director. The date coincides with the 32nd anniversary of Vitale's first game at ESPN.

== Calihan Hall records ==
- Points: 63 – Hersey Hawkins, Bradley University (vs. Detroit, February 22, 1988)
- Points (Titan): 49 – Archie Tullos (vs. Bradley, February 22, 1988)
- Points (team): 135 – Detroit (vs. CCNY, February 10, 1979)
- Rebounds: 39 – Dave DeBusschere (vs. Central Michigan, January 30, 1960)
- Margin of victory: 71 (Detroit 114, Western Ontario 43, January 11, 1964)
- Attendance: 11,065 (Detroit vs. Marquette, March 4, 1978)

== See also ==
- List of NCAA Division I basketball arenas
