= John Styler =

American basketball player

Personal information
- Born: October 19, 1923 Chicago, Illinois, U.S.
- Died: February 19, 1999 (aged 75) Cicero, Illinois, U.S.
- Listed height: 6 ft 6 in (1.98 m)
- Listed weight: 225 lb (102 kg)

Career information
- Playing career: 1944–1948
- Position: Forward / center

Career history
- 1944–1945: Chicago American Gears
- 1945: Indianapolis Kautskys
- 1947–1948: Chicago Shamrocks

John Frederick Styler (October 19, 1923 – February 19, 1999) was an American professional basketball player. He played for the Chicago American Gears and the Indianapolis Kautskys in the National Basketball League and averaged 1.7 points per game.
