= Bob Henshaw =

American basketball player

Personal information
- Born: September 15, 1918 Warren, Ohio
- Died: May 29, 2011 (aged 92) Warren, Ohio
- Listed height: 6 ft 0 in (1.83 m)
- Listed weight: 180 lb (82 kg)

Career information
- High school: Warren G. Harding (Warren, Ohio)
- College: Mount Union (1937–1940)
- Playing career: 1945–1948
- Position: Forward

Career history
- 1945: Youngstown Bears
- 1946–1947: Cleveland Rosenblums
- 1947–1948: Youngstown

Robert Cullen Henshaw (September 15, 1918 – May 29, 2011) was an American professional basketball player. He played for the Youngstown Bears in the National Basketball League for three total games during the 1945–46 season and averaged 1.0 point per game. He also played in various independent leagues of the era.
