= Carl Baer =

American basketball player

Personal information
- Born: February 26, 1918 Aliquippa, Pennsylvania
- Died: July 8, 1996 (aged 78) Aliquippa, Pennsylvania
- Listed height: 6 ft 5 in (1.96 m)

Career information
- High school: Aliquippa (Aliquippa, Pennsylvania)
- Position: Center

Career history
- 1945: Youngstown Bears
- 1945–1946: Larksville (PA)

Carl Leslie Baer (February 26, 1918 – July 8, 1996) was an American professional basketball player. He played for the Youngstown Bears in the National Basketball League for one game during the 1945–46 season.
