= Jim Olsen (basketball) =

American basketball player

Personal information
- Born: June 2, 1921 Brooklyn, New York, U.S.
- Died: December 1, 2000 (aged 79) Midland, Michigan, U.S.
- Listed height: 6 ft 6 in (1.98 m)
- Listed weight: 205 lb (93 kg)

Career information
- High school: Glenbard West (Glen Ellyn, Illinois)
- College: Dartmouth (1940–1943)
- Position: Power forward / center

Career history
- 1945–1946: Chicago American Gears

James Olsen Jr. (June 2, 1921 – December 1, 2000) was an American professional basketball player. He played for the Chicago American Gears in the National Basketball League for nine games during the 1945–46 season and averaged 2.9 points per game.
