= Larry Kenney (basketball) =

American basketball player (1920–2021)

Personal information
- Born: June 13, 1920 Philadelphia, Pennsylvania, U.S.
- Died: December 13, 2021 (aged 101)
- Listed height: 6 ft 1 in (1.85 m)
- Listed weight: 165 lb (75 kg)

Career information
- High school: St. Joseph's Prep (Philadelphia, Pennsylvania)
- College: Saint Joseph's (1938–1941)
- Position: Center

Career history
- 1945: Youngstown Bears

Career highlights
- Second-team All-American – MSG (1940)

Lawrence Aloysius Kenney Jr. (June 13, 1920 – December 13, 2021) was an American professional basketball player. He appeared in one game for the Youngstown Bears during the 1945–46 National Basketball League season.

A native of Philadelphia, Pennsylvania, Kenney attended St. Joseph's Preparatory School and then Saint Joseph's University, where he played for the men's basketball team. After his brief professional basketball career, Kenney earned a law degree from the University of Pennsylvania Law School. He turned 100 in June 2020, and died on December 13, 2021, at the age of 101.
