= Eddie Malanowicz =

American basketball player and coach (1910–1967)

Personal information
- Born: December 30, 1910 Buffalo, New York, U.S.
- Died: September 5, 1967 (aged 56) Cheektowaga, New York, U.S.
- Listed height: 6 ft 3 in (1.91 m)
- Listed weight: 220 lb (100 kg)

Career information
- High school: Fosdick-Masten (Buffalo, New York)
- College: Buffalo (1929–1932)
- Playing career: 1934–1943
- Position: Center
- Coaching career: 1945–1951

Career history

Playing
- 1934–1935, 1937: Buffalo Bisons
- 1938–1943: Rochester Eber-Seagrams

Coaching
- 1945–1948: Rochester Royals
- 1948–1951: Rochester Royals (assistant)

Career highlights
- As head coach: NBL champion (1946); As assistant coach: NBA champion (1951)

Edmund Eugene Malanowicz (December 30, 1910 – September 5, 1967) was an American professional basketball player and coach. He played in the National Basketball League for the Buffalo Bisons during the 1937–38 season and averaged 7.2 points per game. He served as the head coach for the Rochester Royals from 1945–46 through 1947–48, then as an assistant from 1948–49 through 1950–51. During this time, the Royals transitioned from the NBL to the BAA to the NBA.

== Career statistics ==
Legend
GP	Games played	FGM	Field goals made
FTM	Free throws made	FTA	Free throws attempted
FT%	Free throw percentage	PTS	Total points
PPG	Points per game	**Bold**	Career high

=== NBL ===
==== Regular season ====
Year	Team	GP	FGM	FTM	PTS	PPG
1937–38	Buffalo	5	14	8	36	7.2

== Head coaching record ==
Legend
Regular season	G	Games coached	W	Games won	L	Games lost	W–L %	Win–loss %
Playoffs	PG	Playoff games	PW	Playoff wins	PL	Playoff losses	PW–L %	Playoff win–loss %

Team	Year	G	W	L	W–L%	Finish	PG	PW	PL	PW–L%	Result
Rochester	1945–46	34	24	10	.706	2nd in Eastern	7	6	1	.857	**Won NBL Championship**
Rochester	1946–47	44	31	13	.705	1st in Eastern	11	6	5	.545	Lost in NBL Finals
Rochester	1947–48	60	44	16	.733	1st in Eastern	11	6	5	.545	Lost in NBL Finals
Total		138	99	39	.717		29	18	11	.621	
