= Bud O'Rourke =

American basketball player (1919–2001)

Personal information
- Born: January 14, 1919 Chicago, Illinois, U.S.
- Died: November 24, 2001 (aged 82) Mundelein, Illinois, U.S.
- Listed height: 6 ft 4 in (1.93 m)
- Listed weight: 170 lb (77 kg)

Career information
- College: DePaul (1940–1943)
- Position: Forward

Career history
- 1945: Chicago American Gears
- 1946–1947: Gary Ingots
- 1947–1948: Grand Rapids Rangers

Carter John "Bud" O'Rourke Jr. (January 14, 1919 – November 24, 2001) was an American professional basketball player. He played for the Chicago American Gears in the National Basketball League for six games during the 1945–46 season and averaged 0.3 points per game.
