= Don Warnke =

American basketball and baseball player and coach (1920–1970)

Personal information
- Born: April 8, 1920 Michigan City, Indiana, U.S.
- Died: April 14, 1970 (aged 50) Flagstaff, Arizona, U.S.
- Listed height: 6 ft 10 in (2.08 m)
- Listed weight: 200 lb (91 kg)

Career information
- High school: Michigan City (Michigan City, Indiana)
- College: Valparaiso (1942–1944)
- Position: Center

Career history

Playing
- 1944–1945: Cleveland Allmen Transfers
- 1945: Youngstown Bears

Coaching
- 1948–1949: Valparaiso

Donald Leroy Warnke (April 8, 1920 – April 14, 1970) was an American professional basketball player as well as college basketball and baseball coach. He played for the Cleveland Allmen Transfers and Youngstown Bears in the National Basketball League and averaged 1.4 points per game.

Warnke played basketball, but not baseball, at Valparaiso University. He later became the head coach for both programs. He guided the baseball team from 1946 through 1953, while he led the basketball team during the 1948–49 season. His overall baseball record was 71–54, while his overall basketball record was 8–17.
