= Rudy Debnar =

American basketball player

Personal information
- Born: May 9, 1916 Charleroi, Pennsylvania
- Died: May 29, 1982 (aged 66) Akron, Ohio
- Listed height: 5 ft 11 in (1.80 m)
- Listed weight: 160 lb (73 kg)

Career information
- College: Duquesne (1938–1941)
- Position: Guard

Career history

Playing
- 1941–1942: Akron Goodyear Wingfoots
- 1942–1944: Akron Collegians
- 1944–1945: Rochester Guards
- 1945–1946: Youngstown Bears
- 1946–1947: Youngstown Cubs

Coaching
- 1944–1945: Rochester Guards

Rudolph William Debnar (May 9, 1916 – May 29, 1982) was an American basketball player.

== Life and career ==
Rudy Debnar was born in Charleroi, Pennsylvania and was educated at Duquesne University in Pittsburgh where he was a member of the Phi Beta Alpha fraternity (later absorbed into Theta Chi). He played college basketball on the "Iron Dukes" team. In 1941, he was named All-Pennsylvania second team, and years later he was inducted into Duquesne's Athletic Hall of Fame.

Debnar later played professionally in the National Basketball League for the Akron Goodyear Wingfoots and Youngstown Bears; he averaged 5.5 points per game for his career.

After his sports career, Debnar owned and operated the Allied Products Company in Akron, Ohio for 27 years. He and his wife Cora had three children: Donna, Paula, and Lawrence. He died in Akron at the age of 66 on May 29, 1982.
