= Bob Armstrong (basketball, born 1920) =

American basketball player

Personal information
- Born: June 11, 1920 Cambridge, Ohio
- Died: November 22, 2009 (aged 89) Jacksonville, Florida
- Listed height: 6 ft 1 in (1.85 m)
- Listed weight: 180 lb (82 kg)

Career information
- College: Glenville State (1938–1942)
- Position: Forward

Career history
- 1945: Youngstown Bears

Career highlights
- Glenville State University Hall of Fame (2008); WVIAC 50-Year All-Time Team; 2× All-WVIAC (1941, 1942)

Robert F. Armstrong (June 11, 1920 – November 22, 2009) was an American professional basketball player. He played in the National Basketball League for the Youngstown Bears in just one game during the 1945–46 season but did not register a single statistic.

Armstrong was born in Cambridge, Ohio, but was raised in Warren, Ohio. He played college basketball at Glenville State College in Glenville, West Virginia, from 1938 to 1942. He was the sixth man in his freshman season of 1938–39 but then a starter his final three years. He earned All-WVIAC honors twice (1941, 1942). In 2008, he was inducted into Glenville State's Hall of Fame. Armstrong graduated in 1942 and went on to earn a master's degree from Kent State University.

Outside of Armstrong's one-game professional basketball career, he served the U.S. Army in World War II; was a middle- and high-school teacher as well as a high school track, baseball, and basketball coach; worked in insurance, and then owned a private business (TRW Title Insurance Co.) until his retirement in 1998. Armstrong died at McGraw Hospice Center in Jacksonville, Florida, on November 22, 2009, at age 89.
