= Ray Bellingham =

American basketball player

Personal information
- Born: October 29, 1916 Wesleyville, Pennsylvania
- Died: December 21, 1998 (aged 82) Erie, Pennsylvania
- Listed height: 6 ft 8 in (2.03 m)
- Listed weight: 200 lb (91 kg)

Career information
- College: Westminster (PA) (1934–1936)
- Position: Center

Career history
- 1945: Youngstown Bears
- 1945–1946: House of David
- 1946–1948: Corry Vets
- 1948–1949: Warren Bulldogs
- 1949–1950: Erie All-Star
- 1950–1951: Erie

Raymond Thomas "Moose" Bellingham (October 29, 1916 – December 21, 1998) was an American professional basketball player. He played for the Youngstown Bears in the National Basketball League for one game during the 1945–46 season and scored one point. He also played in numerous independent leagues.
