= Ernie Fortney =

American basketball player

Personal information
- Born: January 6, 1915 Pittsburgh, Pennsylvania
- Died: October 11, 1987 (aged 72) Annapolis, Maryland
- Listed height: 6 ft 4 in (1.93 m)
- Listed weight: 220 lb (100 kg)

Career information
- College: Duquesne (1936–1938)
- Position: Center

Career history
- 1938–1939: Pittsburgh Pirates
- 1945–1946: Youngstown Bears
- 1946–1947: Akron Goodyears

Ernest Francis Fortney (January 6, 1915 – October 11, 1987) was an American professional basketball player. He played in college for Duquesne University. Fortney then played in the National Basketball League for the Pittsburgh Pirates and Youngstown Bears where he averaged 3.1 points per game in his career.
