= Nick Hashu =

American basketball player (1917–2012)

Personal information
- Born: February 1, 1917 Hammond, Indiana
- Died: April 28, 2012 (aged 95) Fullerton, California
- Listed height: 6 ft 1 in (1.85 m)
- Listed weight: 195 lb (88 kg)

Career information
- High school: Hammond (Hammond, Indiana)
- College: Valparaiso (1942–1944); Michigan State (1944–1945)
- Position: Forward / center

Career history
- 1936–1937: Keisers Inn
- 1937–1938: Hammond General American
- 1938–1939: Hammond Ciesar All-Americans
- 1939–1941: Hammond
- 1945: Chicago American Gears

Nicholas S. Hashu (February 1, 1917 – April 28, 2012) was an American professional basketball player. He played in the National Basketball League for the Hammond Ciesar All-Americans and Chicago American Gears. He averaged 2.2 points per game.
