= Bob Baker (basketball) =

American basketball player (1919–1950)

Personal information
- Born: February 24, 1919 Union Township, Indiana, U.S.
- Died: November 28, 1950 (aged 31) Frankfort, Indiana, U.S.
- Listed height: 5 ft 11 in (1.80 m)
- Listed weight: 160 lb (73 kg)

Career information
- High school: Union (Union Township, Indiana)
- College: Franklin (Indiana) (1937–1941)
- Position: Guard

Career history
- 1939–1942: Stewart-Warner
- 1942, 1945: Indianapolis Kautskys
- 1946–1947: Indianapolis Secos

Lloyd Owen Baker (February 24, 1919 – November 28, 1950), whose nickname is sometimes attributed as Bob, was an American professional basketball player. He played for the Indianapolis Kautskys in the National Basketball League in six games during the 1945–46 season, but was released on December 14, 1945.

== Biography ==
Born in Union Township, Indiana, Baker was a standout athlete growing up. He attended Union High School from 1933 to 1937 where he was an all-county basketball player. He then attended Franklin College from 1937 to 1941 and played for the school's football and basketball teams. While in college he was also a member of the Kappa Delta Rho fraternity. Outside of school, Baker joined a powerhouse semi-professional industrial basketball league team, Stewart-Warner, in 1939. Baker helped Stewart-Warner win the national industrial championship in 1939–40.

Baker served in the Army during World War II as a paratrooper in the 101st Airborne Division, where he saw combat in Europe. After his military discharge he took a job as a sales representative by the Skelgas division of the Skelly Oil Company, a position he would hold until his premature death. He did continue playing basketball both professionally and semi-professionally. Baker had a six-game stint for the Indianapolis Kautskys where he averaged 2.5 points per game. He also played for the semi-pro team Indianapolis Secos in 1946–47.

== Death ==
On November 28, 1950, Baker was playing in an industrial league game at Franklin Gymnasium in Frankfort, Indiana. He began to feel ill during the third quarter and sat out the remainder of the contest. That night, he died of a heart attack in his home at age 31.
