= Jack Oberst =

American basketball player

Personal information
- Born: August 11, 1918 Cleveland, Ohio, U.S.
- Died: June 1, 2009 (aged 90) Englewood, Florida, U.S.
- Listed height: 5 ft 11 in (1.80 m)
- Listed weight: 175 lb (79 kg)

Career information
- High school: East (Cleveland, Ohio)
- College: Baldwin Wallace (1939–1942)
- Position: Forward

Career history
- 1945–1946: Cleveland Allmen Transfers

John Ralph Oberst (August 11, 1918 – June 1, 2009) was an American professional basketball player. He played for the Cleveland Allmen Transfers in the National Basketball League for nine games during the 1945–46 season and averaged 1.1 points per game.
