= Babe Ziegenhorn =

American basketball player

Personal information
- Born: November 21, 1918 Chicago, Illinois, U.S.
- Died: August 23, 1970 (aged 51) Sheboygan, Wisconsin, U.S.
- Listed height: 6 ft 0 in (1.83 m)
- Listed weight: 185 lb (84 kg)

Career information
- High school: St. Phillip (Chicago, Illinois)
- College: Notre Dame (1938–1939)
- Position: Guard / forward

Career history
- 1941–1942, 1945: Sheboygan Red Skins

Maurice Joseph "Babe" Ziegenhorn (November 21, 1918 – August 23, 1970) was an American professional basketball player.

Ziegenhorn attended the now-defunct St. Phillip High School in Chicago, Illinois, before starring at the University of Notre Dame during the late 1930s and early 1940s. After graduating, he served on the College All-Stars team which served as opponents for the Harlem Globetrotters. In the 1941–42 season and the beginning of the 1945–46 season, he played professionally for the Sheboygan Red Skins of the National Basketball League, a direct predecessor to the NBA. He averaged 2.0 points per game for the team.
