= Bob Brown (basketball, born 1921) =

American basketball player

Personal information
- Born: February 20, 1921 McKinney, Texas
- Died: April 16, 2001 (aged 80) Austin, Texas
- Listed height: 6 ft 7 in (2.01 m)

Career information
- College: Oklahoma (1937–1938)
- Position: Center

Career history
- 1945: Indianapolis Kautskys
- 1945–1946: Indianapolis Pure Oils
- 1945–1946: Gordon Shamrocks
- 1946: Allison Jets

Robert Graves Brown (February 20, 1921 – April 16, 2001) was an American professional basketball player in the United States' National Basketball League. He played for the Indianapolis Kautskys in three games during the 1945–46 season. He also played for the Indianapolis Pure Oils in the 1945 World Professional Basketball Tournament.
