= Dick Lange (basketball) =

American basketball player (1921–2012)

Personal information
- Born: June 3, 1921 Mayville, Wisconsin, U.S.
- Died: February 9, 2012 (aged 90) Mesa, Arizona, U.S.

Career information
- High school: Mayville (Mayville, Wisconsin)
- College: Wisconsin–Whitewater (1940–1943)
- Position: Forward

Career history
- 1945: Oshkosh All-Stars
- 1946–1949: Milwaukee Shooting Stars

Richard Charles Lange Sr. (June 3, 1921 – February 9, 2012) was an American professional basketball player. He played for the Oshkosh All-Stars in the National Basketball League for four games during the 1945–46 season and averaged 0.5 points per game.
