= Woody Norris =

American basketball player (1919–2007)

Personal information
- Born: June 18, 1919 Washington, Indiana, U.S.
- Died: April 25, 2007 (aged 87) Bloomington, Indiana, U.S.
- Listed height: 6 ft 1 in (1.85 m)
- Listed weight: 170 lb (77 kg)

Career information
- High school: Washington (Washington, Indiana)
- College: Butler (1938–1941)
- Position: Small forward / shooting guard

Career history
- 1941–1942, 1945–1948: Indianapolis Kautskys

Elwood Adrian "Woody" Norris (June 18, 1919 – April 25, 2007) was an American professional basketball player. He played for the Indianapolis Kautskys in the National Basketball League during the 1941–42 season, served in the United States Army Air Forces during World War II, then continued his basketball career with the Kautskys between 1945 and 1948. In college he played basketball and football for Butler University.
