= Ray Terzynski =

American basketball player

Personal information
- Born: November 27, 1919 Rhinelander, Wisconsin, U.S.
- Died: August 18, 1983 (aged 63) Rhinelander, Wisconsin, U.S.
- Listed height: 6 ft 1 in (1.85 m)
- Listed weight: 180 lb (82 kg)

Career information
- High school: Rhinelander (Rhinelander, Wisconsin)
- College: !Wisconsin–Stevens Point (1941–1943)
- Position: Forward

Career history
- 1943–1946: Oshkosh All-Stars

Raymond Walter Terzynski (November 27, 1919 – August 18, 1983) was an American professional basketball player. He played for the Oshkosh All-Stars in the National Basketball League for three seasons and averaged 3.7 points per game.
