= Tommy Rich (basketball) =

American basketball player (1916–2011)

Personal information
- Born: April 26, 1916 Hobart, New York, U.S.
- Died: November 14, 2011 (aged 95) Venice, Florida, U.S.
- Listed height: 6 ft 3 in (1.91 m)
- Listed weight: 185 lb (84 kg)

Career information
- College: Cornell (1935–1938)
- Playing career: 1938–1947
- Position: Forward

Career history
- 1938–1943: Rochester Eber-Seagrams
- 1938–1940: Newark Elks
- 1943–1945: Rochester Pros
- 1945–1946: Rochester Royals
- 1946: Long Island Hellcats
- 1946–1947: Syracuse All-Syracuse
- 1946–1947: Auburn – New York

Thomas A. Rich (April 26, 1916 – November 14, 2011) was an American professional basketball player. He played for the Rochester Royals in the National Basketball League during the 1945–46 season and averaged 2.6 points per game. He also competed in independent leagues in the Syracuse, New York area.

In college, Rich earned varsity letters playing for the soccer, basketball, and baseball teams at Cornell University. He was a member of the Quill and Dagger society and inducted into the Cornell Athletic Hall of Fame. After his Cornell career was over, Rich was hired as an engineer at Seagram's, then in 1943 started working for P&C Food Markets in Syracuse. He retired as president of the company in 1974.
