= Bruce Boehler =

American basketball player (1917–1987)

Personal information
- Born: July 8, 1917 Tiffin, Ohio, U.S.
- Died: November 6, 2000 (aged 83) Elyria, Ohio, U.S.
- Listed height: 5 ft 11 in (1.80 m)
- Listed weight: 195 lb (88 kg)

Career information
- High school: Lorain (Lorain, Ohio)
- College: Kentucky (1941–1942)
- Position: Guard

Career history
- 1936–1937: Ohio Fuel Gas
- 1937–1938: Vermillion Martin Pontiacs
- 1938–1939: Kohlmyer Hardware
- 1939–1940: Birmingham Fireman
- 1945: Cleveland Allmen Transfers
- 1947–1948: Elyria Standard Cleaners
- 1948–1949: Birmingham Fireman

Bruce D. Boehler (July 8, 1917 – July 2, 1987) was an American professional basketball player. He played for the Cleveland Allmen Transfers in the National Basketball League for five games during the 1945–46 season and averaged 1.6 points per game.

He participated in basketball, baseball, and track at the University of Kentucky. Boehler served in World War II and became a schoolteacher.
