= Steve Sharkey =

American basketball player (1918–1995)

Personal information
- Born: December 30, 1918 Schenectady, New York, U.S.
- Died: March 15, 1995 (aged 76) Syracuse, New York, U.S.
- Listed height: 6 ft 0 in (1.83 m)
- Listed weight: 190 lb (86 kg)

Career information
- High school: Nott Terrace (Schenectady, New York)
- Playing career: 1939–1949
- Position: Guard / forward

Career history
- 1939–1940: Schenectady Pros
- 1939–1942: Saratoga Indians
- 1941–1942: Detroit Eagles
- 1945–1947: Sheboygan Red Skins
- 1946–1948: Syracuse Nationals
- 1948–1949: Glens Falls Commodores

Stephen Francis Sharkey (December 30, 1918 – March 15, 1995) was an American professional basketball player. He played for the Sheboygan Red Skins and Syracuse Nationals in the National Basketball League, where he averaged 4.2 points per game in 120 appearances.
