= Don Harvey (basketball) =

American basketball player (1920–2008)

Personal information
- Born: July 29, 1920 Jefferson City, Missouri
- Died: November 26, 2008 (aged 88) Livingston, Montana
- Listed height: 5 ft 11 in (1.80 m)
- Listed weight: 180 lb (82 kg)

Career information
- College: Missouri (1939–1942)
- Position: Guard / forward

Career history
- 1945: Sheboygan Red Skins
- 1948–1949: Saratoga Indians

Donald Lindley Harvey (July 29, 1920 – November 26, 2008) was an American professional basketball player. He played in the National Basketball League in one game for the Sheboygan Red Skins during the 1945–46 season.

While attending the University of Missouri he competed for the football, basketball, and tennis teams. He then served in the Army and worked on the Manhattan Project prior to becoming a professional basketball player. His post-playing careers included running a book store, being a restaurateur, and cattle ranching.
