= Huck Hartman =

American basketball player (1920-1946)

Personal information
- Born: October 23, 1920 Salina, Pennsylvania
- Died: March 25, 1946 (aged 25) Sharon, Pennsylvania
- Listed height: 6 ft 7 in (2.01 m)
- Listed weight: 205 lb (93 kg)

Career information
- High school: New Kensington (New Kensington, Pennsylvania)
- College: Duquesne (1939–1940); Washington & Jefferson (1940–1943)
- Playing career: 1944–1946
- Position: Center

Career history
- 1944–1945: Pittsburgh Raidres
- 1945–1946: Youngstown Bears

Career highlights
- All-NBL Second Team (1945)

Pierre Marion "Huck" Hartman (October 23, 1920 – March 25, 1946) was an American professional basketball player. Hartman played in the National Basketball League (NBL) for the Pittsburgh Raidres in 1944–45 and the Youngstown Bears in 1945–46. He died on March 25, 1946, aged 25, from pneumonia, just two weeks after the completion of the season. Hartman was the first, and only, active player to die while in the United States' NBL. Tragically, both of his parents would end up outliving both Huck and his two brothers, Phillip and Hiram, as Phillip would die in 1951 at 36 years old and Hiram would die in 1966 at 49 years old.

== See also ==
- List of basketball players who died during their careers
