= Jerry Steiner =

American basketball player

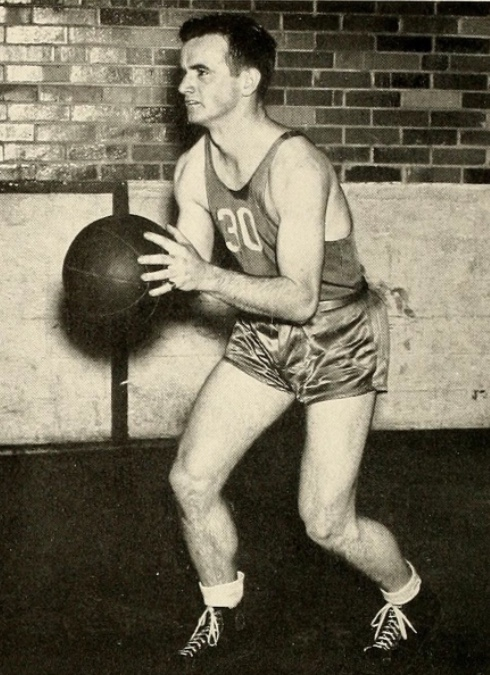
- Steiner at Butler

Personal information
- Born: January 7, 1918 Berne, Indiana, U.S.
- Died: February 1, 2012 (aged 94) Bonita Springs, Florida, U.S.
- Listed height: 5 ft 7 in (1.70 m)
- Listed weight: 160 lb (73 kg)

Career information
- College: Butler (1937–1940)
- Position: Point guard

Career history
- 1945–1946: Indianapolis Kautskys
- 1946–1947: Fort Wayne Zollner Pistons

Career highlights
- All-NBL Second Team (1946); First-team All-American – MSG (1940)

Jerome C. Steiner (January 7, 1918 – February 1, 2012) was an American professional basketball player. He played two seasons in the National Basketball League (NBL), one of the two leagues that merged to form the National Basketball Association.

Steiner, a 5'7" point guard was a basketball player for Butler University from 1937 to 1940. He made the 1940 All-American team as a senior for the Bulldogs.

After graduating from Butler, Steiner played for one season for the Indianapolis Kautskys of the NBL for the 1945–46 season. After serving in World War II until 1946, Steiner took a job teaching and coaching at Shortridge High School in Indianapolis while playing for the Fort Wayne Zollner Pistons. He left the game after the 1946–47 season.

Steiner died on February 1, 2012, in Bonita Springs, Florida, at the age of 94.
