= Bob Calihan =

American basketball player and coach

Personal information
- Born: August 2, 1918 Perry, Iowa, U.S.
- Died: September 22, 1989 (aged 71) Detroit, Michigan, U.S.
- Listed height: 6 ft 3 in (1.91 m)
- Listed weight: 200 lb (91 kg)

Career information
- High school: St. George (Evanston, Illinois)
- College: Detroit Mercy (1937–1940)
- Playing career: 1940–1948
- Position: Shooting guard / small forward

Career history

Playing
- 1940–1942: Detroit Eagles
- 1942–1944: New London Diesels
- 1942–1943: Harrisburg Senators
- 1943–1944: Hartford Villanovas
- 1945–1947: Chicago American Gears
- 1947–1948: Flint Dow. A.C.'s
- 1948: Syracuse Nationals

Coaching
- 1948–1969: Detroit Mercy

Career highlights
- NBL champion (1947); 4× All-NBL Second Team (1941, 1946–1948); Consensus second-team All-American (1939); No. 17 retired by Detroit Mercy Titans

Robert James Calihan (August 2, 1918 – September 22, 1989) was an American basketball player and coach.

Calihan played for the University of Detroit from 1937 to 1940. He led his team in scoring during each of his three seasons and became the school's first All-American honoree in 1939. After graduating in 1940, he played professionally in the National Basketball League for the Detroit Eagles, Chicago American Gears, Syracuse Nationals and other teams. He became Detroit Mercy's basketball coach in 1948, and remained in that position until 1969. Over his coaching career, he posted a 360–237 record, leading his team to three NIT appearances and an appearance in the 1962 NCAA Men's Division I Basketball Tournament. Detroit Mercy's Calihan Hall was named in his honor in 1977.
