= 1946 World Professional Basketball Tournament =

World Professional Basketball Tournament
- 1946

Tournament information
- Location: Chicago, Illinois
- Dates: 25 March–8 April
- Teams: 14

Final positions
- Champions: Fort Wayne Zollner Pistons
- 1st runner-up: Oshkosh All-Stars
- 2nd runner-up: Chicago American Gears

Tournament statistics
- MVP: George Mikan
- Top scorer: George Mikan

The 1946 World Professional Basketball Tournament was the eighth edition of the World Professional Basketball Tournament. It was held in Chicago, Illinois, during the days of 25 March - 8 April 1946 and featured 14 teams, with the teams mostly comprising a mixture of independently ran teams and teams from the National Basketball League, alongside the addition of the American Basketball League's champion team that year, the Baltimore Bullets. This year's tournament would also be the only WPBT event where the championship match and the third place match would be in a best of three format instead of a winner takes all format. The event had a home town team for local fans to cheer on during the tournament with the Chicago American Gears of the NBL, but they would be knocked out by the semifinal round against the NBL's Oshkosh All-Stars due to Oshkosh fouling out star center George Mikan and stealing the match away from them afterward. The tournament was won by the Fort Wayne Zollner Pistons, who won their third straight championship in the event (and final championship in the WPBT's history), though wouldn't also win the NBL's championship alongside it due to the Rochester Royals winning that league's championship that year, after defeating the Oshkosh All-Stars (under what later became their final year competing for the championship in that event) 2–1 in the championship series. The Chicago American Gears came in third after beating the Baltimore Bullets 2–0 in the third-place best-of-three series. Despite his team not even participating in the championship series, George Mikan of the American Gears was named the tournament's Most Valuable Player after finishing as its top scorer with 100 points in five games.

== Results ==
=== Bracket ===
Round 1 single match
Midland Dow Chemicals	72
Indianapolis Kautskys	59
Dayton Mickeys	58
Baltimore Bullets	61
Anderson Chiefs	59
Cleveland Allmen Transfers	46
Chicago American Gears	69
Pittsburgh Raiders	58
Detroit Mansfields	32
Oshkosh All-Stars	60
New York Renaissance	82
Toledo White Huts	39

Quarterfinals single match
Fort Wayne Zollner Pistons	65
Midland Dow Chemicals	62
Baltimore Bullets	67
Anderson Chiefs	65
Sheboygan Red Skins	51
Chicago American Gears	52
Oshkosh All-Stars	50
New York Renaissance	44

Semifinals single match
Fort Wayne Zollner Pistons	50
Baltimore Bullets	49
Chicago American Gears	66
Oshkosh All-Stars	72

Final best-of-three series
Fort Wayne Zollner Pistons	59	56	73
Oshkosh All-Stars	61	47	57
Third place
Chicago American Gears	59	65
Baltimore Bullets	54	50

=== Third place series ===
5 April 1946

Chicago American Gears 59, Baltimore Bullets 54
Pts: G. Mikan – 17

Chicago Stadium
Attendance: 11,131

6 April 1946

Chicago American Gears 65, Baltimore Bullets 50
Pts: G. Mikan – 27	Pts: S. Stutz – 11

Chicago Stadium
Attendance: 17,782

=== Championship series ===
5 April 1946

Box score

Oshkosh All-Stars 61, Fort Wayne Zollner Pistons 59
Scoring by half: 40–25, 21–34
Pts: B. Carpenter – 19	Pts: B. McDermott – 17

Chicago Stadium
Attendance: 11,131
Referees: Nat Messinger, Frank Kriznecky

6 April 1946

Box score

Oshkosh All-Stars 47, Fort Wayne Zollner Pistons 56
Scoring by half: 24–32, 23–24
Pts: L. Edwards – 24	Pts: B. McDermott – 13

Chicago Stadium
Attendance: 17,782
Referees: Messinger, Kriznecky

8 April 1946

Box score

Oshkosh All-Stars 57, Fort Wayne Zollner Pistons 73
Scoring by half: 32–39, 25–34
Pts: L. Edwards – 24	Pts: B. McDermott – 20

Chicago Stadium
Attendance: 8,440
Referees: Nat Messinger, Frank Kriznecky

== Individual awards ==
- The recently added George Mikan of the Chicago American Gears led this tournament in scoring with a tournament record-high 100 points scored in five games played. That would be the only time the WPBT would utilize a different format to expand their system out, however.

=== All-Tournament First Team ===
- F - Jerry Bush, Fort Wayne Zollner Pistons
- F - Leroy Edwards, Oshkosh All-Stars
- C - George Mikan, Chicago American Gears (MVP)
- G - Bobby McDermott, Fort Wayne Zollner Pistons
- G - Bob Feerick, Oshkosh All-Stars

=== All-Tournament Second Team ===
- F - Paul Cloyd, Midland Dow Chemicals
- F - Bob Calihan, Chicago American Gears
- C - Mike Bloom, Baltimore Bullets
- G - Stan Stutz, Baltimore Bullets
- G - Bob Carpenter, Oshkosh All-Stars

== See also ==
- 1945–46 National Basketball League (United States) season, a professional basketball season featuring six out of eight teams there, including the eventual three-time defending WPBT champions in the Fort Wayne Zollner Pistons
- 1945–46 Baltimore Bullets season, a professional basketball season involving the eventual champions of the revived version of the original American Basketball League in the (original) Baltimore Bullets franchise
