= Chicago American Gears =

American basketball team

- Founded: c.1943
- Folded: 1947
- History: Chicago American Gears; 1944–1947 (NBL); 1947 (PBLA)
- Arena: International Amphitheatre
- Capacity: 9,000
- Location: Chicago, Illinois, U.S.
- Ownership: Maurice White
- Championships: NBL: 1 (1947)

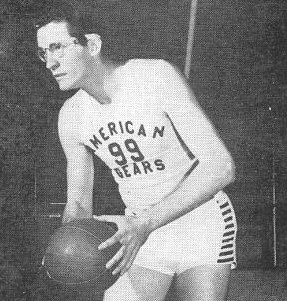
George Mikan as a member of the Chicago American Gears

The Chicago American Gears were an American basketball team that played professionally in the National Basketball League (NBL) from 1944 to 1947 and in the Professional Basketball League of America (PBLA) in 1947 after leaving the NBL. The team is best known for George Mikan's stint with the team where he led them to the 1947 NBL championship. The team's owner, Maurice White, also owned the local American Gear & Manufacturing Company as well, hence the name of the team.

== History ==
They are notable in professional basketball history for two things. First, they were the rookie year pro team of basketball legend George Mikan. Mikan had starred at local DePaul University as a collegian. After holding out for several weeks for money he felt owed him by the Gears, Mikan joined the team early enough to help them finish with a third-place record in the West Division of the 10-team National Basketball League that season. Nearly seven feet tall, Mikan then led playoff upsets for the Gears over three teams en route to the 1947 NBL Championship, then widely considered the most prestigious title in pro basketball.

Prior to their move to the NBL, the American Gears had played in the Amateur Athletic Union for at least the 1943–44 season.

=== 1946-47 season ===
The 1946–47 Chicago American Gears season was the Gears' third year in the United States' National Basketball League (NBL), which was also the league's twelfth season. Twelve teams competed in the NBL in 1946–47, comprising six teams in both the Eastern and Western Divisions.

Chicago played their home games at the International Amphitheatre. Despite finishing tied with the Sheboygan Red Skins for third place in the Western Division, the American Gears made a surprise playoff run by winning the first series three games to two (3–2) over the Indianapolis Kautskys, followed by a 2–0 sweep of Oshkosh All-Stars in the semifinals. They then went on to win their first league championship 3–1 over Eastern Division champion Rochester Royals.

Player-coach Bobby McDermott (First Team), George Mikan (First), and Bob Calihan (Second) earned All-NBL honors during that season.

=== PBLA ===
After winning the 1947 NBL title, White announced he was leaving the NBL to form his own league, the ambitious 24-team Professional Basketball League of America. Start-up costs proved prohibitive, however, and crowds for PBLA games were often very small. After the Gears 8-0 start in the first month of the season, the league folded due to financial difficulties. The Gears later folded after its plea of joining the NBL again was rejected. Supposedly, according to sports historian author Robert Bradley in The Compendium of Professional Basketball, there was initially going to be a team called the Chicago Ingots replacing the American Gears for the 1947–48 NBL season, but that ultimately never came to fruition.

== Season-by-season records ==
Note: GP = Games played, W = Wins, L = Losses, W–L% = Winning percentage

Season	GP	W	L	W–L%	Finish	Playoffs
NBL
1944–45	30	14	16	0.467	2nd	Lost Western semifinals
1945–46	34	17	17	0.500	3rd	Did not qualify
1946–47	46	28	18	0.581	3rd	Won Opening Round (Kautskys) 3–2; Won Division semifinals (All-Stars) 2–0; Won NBL Championship (Royals) 3–1
PBLA
1947–48	8	8	0	1.000	1st	League disbanded before playoffs
NBL Totals	110	59	51	0.536	–	1 NBL Championship
PBLA Totals	8	8	0	1.000	1st	Playoff record 0–0
Franchise Totals	118	67	51	0.568	–	1 Championship
