= Youngstown Bears =

The Youngstown Bears were a professional basketball team based in Youngstown, Ohio. They played for only two seasons (1945–1947) in the National Basketball League before disbanding operations entirely due to rising costs in fielding teams.

The team had previously begun as the Pittsburgh Raiders with local players coming home from World War II in 1944. Joe Urso was the player-coach of the team during that season, with their star player being a promising young center named Huck Hartman. Being unsuccessful with a 7-23 record, the team found themselves new backers in Youngstown (who had become fans of the team) instead, though the Pittsburgh Raiders would still continue existing later on as an independent franchise. While playing in the National Basketball League's 1945-46 season, the Bears included the previous season's All-NBL Second Team center Huck Hartman, local star Leo Mogus (later of NBA play), noted pro Frankie Baumholtz and Press Maravich, future noted college coach and father to NBA legend Pete Maravich, among others. Their team had a 13-20 record. Regrouping for a try the following season, the Bears were challenged by an expanding NBL and a resulting demand for top players to join up in the NBL. At the same time, during that year, another top pro league, the Basketball Association of America, also started up operations as well. Mogus and Baumholtz jumped to the BAA to play for the Cleveland Rebels. Maravich jumped to the BAA to play for the Pittsburgh Ironmen. Coach Birch also jumped leagues to coach the BAA's Pittsburgh team for good measure, leaving four key figures that the Bears franchise was outbid for by the new BAA. The Bears' 12-32 team in the 1946-47 season (a season that saw the creation of the majority of the present-day surviving NBL franchises in the present-day NBA instead) would end up being their last as a franchise.
