= 1946–47 Chicago American Gears season =

NBL professional basketball team season

- NBL champions
- Head coach: Davey Banks (3–3); Harry Foote (interim) & Bruce Hale (interim player-coach; 4–7); Bobby McDermott (player-coach; 19–7)
- Owner(s): Maurice White; American Gear & Manufacturing Company
- Arena: International Amphitheatre

Results
- Record: 26–18 (.591)
- Place: Division: T–3rd (tied with Sheboygan Red Skins) (Western)
- Playoff finish: NBL champions (Won 3–1 over Rochester Royals)

The 1946–47 Chicago American Gears season was the American Gears' third and final year in the United States' National Basketball League (NBL), which was also the tenth year the league existed. However, if you include the (at least) one previous season where they competed in the Amateur Athletic Union before making the jump into the NBL, this would actually be their fourth and final full season of play instead. This also was the NBL's first official season where they actually implemented a drafting system similar to what the future rivaling Basketball Association of America (and later merging partner to become the National Basketball Association) had for the eventual NBA draft system a year later following the conclusion of their inaugural league season for the purpose of controlled player salaries and limiting the idea of outbidding other players outside of their own 12-player teams at hand (with the NBL having a budget of $6,000 this season), as well as implementing key players to signing binding contracts as soon as they could and the NBL looking to have full-time referees on display. Twelve teams competed in the NBL in 1946–47, comprising six teams in both the Eastern and Western Divisions.

Chicago played their home games at the International Amphitheatre, which would have a significantly larger crowd capacity at hand than the venue they used for the previous season, the Cicero Stadium. Despite finishing tied for third place with the Sheboygan Red Skins in the Western Division, the American Gears made a surprise playoffs run by winning the first series three games to two (3–2) over the Indianapolis Kautskys, followed by a 2–0 sweep of Oshkosh All-Stars in the semifinals. They then went on to win their first and only NBL championship 3–1 over Eastern Division champion Rochester Royals. Weirdly enough, despite the American Gears being considered the champions of the 1947 NBL Playoffs, the NBL's commissioner of the time period, Ward Lambert, considered the American Gears to only be the champions of the NBL Playoffs that season instead of the overall champions of the league since he inexplicably considered the team with the best overall record that season (the Rochester Royals) to be the official league champions that season. That decision would help play into the team's final decision into leaving the NBL in order to create their own, short-lived rivaling professional league called the Professional Basketball League of America for their short, final following season of play.

When combining their NBL scheduled regular season and playoff games with the exhibition games they had this season, the Chicago American Gears would have a 47–31 record. (Alternatively, it would be considered a 47–32 record instead if one NBL game against the Rochester Royals that Chicago had protested to late in the regular season that was considered a no contest match had actually counted as its own match that night.)

Player-coach Bobby McDermott (First Team), George Mikan (First), and Bob Calihan (Second) all earned All-NBL honors for this season.

== Draft picks ==
Entering this season, the National Basketball League would utilize their own draft system that would be considered similar to what the NFL has done for the NFL draft. As such, the 1946 NBL draft would be considered the first ever professional basketball draft ever done, even before the 1947 BAA draft that was done by the soon to be rivaling Basketball Association of America. Because of that fact, the Chicago American Gears would participate in the inaugural 1946 NBL draft, which had occurred sometime during the 1946–47 season's offseason period before that season officially began for the NBL. However, as of 2026, no records of what the American Gears' draft picks might have been for the NBL have properly come up, with any information on who those selections might have been for Chicago likely being lost to time in the process.

== Roster ==
1946–47 Chicago American Gears roster
Players

Pos.	No.	Player	Height	Weight	DOB	From
G/F	12	Price Brookfield	6 ft 4 in (1.93 m)	185 lb (84 kg)	1920–05–11	Iowa State
G/F	14	Bob Calihan	6 ft 3 in (1.91 m)	200 lb (91 kg)	1918–08–02	Detroit Mercy
F/C		Bob Cotton	6 ft 6 in (1.98 m)	250 lb (113 kg)	1920–12–29	Texas Wesleyan
F/C	4	Bruce Hale	6 ft 1 in (1.85 m)	170 lb (77 kg)	1918–08–30	Santa Clara
G	6	Bobby McDermott	5 ft 11 in (1.80 m)	180 lb (82 kg)	1914–01–07	Flushing HS (NY)
G/F		Bill McDonald	6 ft 3 in (1.91 m)	190 lb (86 kg)	1916–11–05	Marquette
C	99	George Mikan	6 ft 10 in (2.08 m)	245 lb (111 kg)	1924–06–18	DePaul
F/C	7	Max Morris	6 ft 2 in (1.88 m)	195 lb (88 kg)	1925–03–13	Northwestern
F/C		Irv Noren	6 ft 0 in (1.83 m)	180 lb (82 kg)	1924–11–29	Pasadena CC
G/F	9	Stan Patrick	6 ft 2 in (1.88 m)	185 lb (84 kg)	1922–05–05	Illinois
F/C	5	George Ratkovicz	6 ft 6 in (1.98 m)	220 lb (100 kg)	1922–11–13	Robert E. Lindblom Technical HS (IL)
G/F		Les Rothman	6 ft 1 in (1.85 m)	195 lb (88 kg)	1926–08–12	LIU Brooklyn
F/C	10	Art Stoefen	6 ft 5 in (1.96 m)	215 lb (98 kg)	1914–08–29	Stanford
F/C		Bob Synnott	6 ft 3 in (1.91 m)	190 lb (86 kg)	1912–09–27	Theodore Roosevelt HS (NY)
G	11	Stan Szukala	6 ft 1 in (1.85 m)	175 lb (79 kg)	1918–06–12	DePaul
G/F	3	Dick Triptow	6 ft 0 in (1.83 m)	170 lb (77 kg)	1922–11–03	DePaul

Coaches
Head coach
- Maurice White (owner-coach)
- Davey Banks (fired/resigned)
- Harry Foote (interim)
- Bruce Hale (interim)
- Bobby McDermott

Legend
- (DP) Unsigned draft pick
- (FA) Free agent
- (S) Suspended
- Injured

Roster

Note: Bob Cotton, Bill McDonald, Irv Noren, Les Rothman, and Bob Synnott were not on the playoffs roster. In addition to them, Charlie Butler, Jim Cominsky, and George Mikan's older brother, Joe Mikan, would only play for the team during this season's preseason period, with Bill McDonald also being cut from the team after their preseason period of play concluded, though McDonald managed to return to the team at some point in 1946 for the regular season only.

Maurice A. White owner of the American Gear started the season as coach, on November 21 he stepped down when he signed Davey Banks as a coach.

== Regular season ==
=== Season standings ===
Pos.	Western Division	Wins	Losses	Win %
1	Oshkosh All-Stars	28	16	.636
2	Indianapolis Kautskys	27	17	.614
T–3	Chicago American Gears	26	18	.591
T–3	Sheboygan Red Skins	26	18	.591
5	Anderson Duffey Packers	24	20	.545
6	Detroit Gems	4	40	.091

=== Exhibition Games ===
Reference: Dick Triptow's The Dynasty That Never Was, pg. 94

- October 31, 1946: Rochester Royals 55, Chicago American Gears 50 (@ Schenectady, New York)
- November 1, 1946: Rochester Royals 69, Chicago American Gears 68 (@ Gloversville, New York)
- November 2, 1946: Chicago American Gears 65, Rochester Royals 61 (@ Rochester, New York)
- November 13, 1946: Chicago American Gears 73, Jersey City Atoms 70 (OT via American Basketball League rules)
- November 14, 1946: Baltimore Bullets 57, Chicago American Gears 53 (via ABL rules)
- November 15, 1946: Chicago American Gears 64, Baltimore Mets 42
- November 16, 1946: Philadelphia Sphas 81, Chicago American Gears 79 (via ABL rules)
- November 17, 1946: Chicago American Gears 40, Newark Bobcats 34 (via ABL rules)
- November 22, 1946: Chicago American Gears 59, Los Angeles Red Devils 56
- November 23, 1946: Los Angeles Red Devils 47, Chicago American Gears 46
- December 8, 1946: Chicago American Gears 76, Dayton Metropolitans 33
- December 21, 1946: Baltimore Bullets 62, Chicago American Gears 60 (via National Basketball League rules)
- January 1, 1947: Chicago American Gears 40, Chicago Monarchs 38
- January 19, 1947: Chicago American Gears 48, Baltimore Bullets 41 (via NBL rules)
- January 20, 1947: Chicago American Gears 67, Gary Ingots 57
- January 22, 1947: Chicago American Gears 70, Rockford Press Club 58
- January 27, 1947: Fort Wayne Zollner Pistons 69, Chicago American Gears 62 (@ Milwaukee, Wisconsin)
- January 28, 1947: Midland Dow Chemicals 78, Chicago American Gears 53
- February 2, 1947: Chicago American Gears 70, Midland Dow Chemicals 60
- March 10, 1947: Dayton Metropolitans 52, Chicago American Gears 48
- April 11, 1947: Rochester Royals 76, Chicago American Gears 73 (@ Hershey, Pennsylvania for the "Royals Appreciation Series")
- April 12, 1947: Chicago American Gears 75, Rochester Royals 74 (OT @ Schenectady, New York for the "Royals Appreciation Series")
- April 13, 1947: Chicago American Gears 68, Rochester Royals 60 (@ Rochester, New York for the "Royals Appreciation Series")

=== NBL Schedule ===
Reference: Dick Triptow's The Dynasty That Never Was, pg. 93

#	Date	Opponent	Score	Record
1	November 9	@ Oshkosh	61–66	0–1
2	November 28	@ Sheboygan	40–48	0–2
3	November 30	@ Rochester	65–64	1–2
4	December 3	@ Syracuse	69–59	2–2
5	December 6	N Syracuse	55–57	2–3
6	December 10	@ Youngstown	72–60	3–3
7	December 11	Oshkosh	41–44	3–4
8	December 13	Fort Wayne	47–40	4–4
9	December 15	Detroit	58–43	5–4
10	December 17	@ Toledo	58–57	6–4
11	December 18	@ Detroit	56–60	6–5
12	December 20	Rochester	59–48	7–5
13	December 22	Anderson	54–57	7–6
14	December 23	@ Anderson	60–63	7–7
—	December 25	@ Buffalo	Cancelled	
15	December 26	@ Indianapolis	59–67	7–8
16	December 27	Toledo	59–62	7–9
17	December 29	Sheboygan	58–63	7–10
18	January 3	Indianapolis	57–58 (OT)	7–11
19	January 5	Youngstown	55–45	8–11
20	January 8	@ Fort Wayne	55–56	8–12
21	January 11	@ Tri-Cities	43–48	8–13
22	January 16	@ Anderson	58–56	9–13
23	January 17	Tri-Cities	53–30	10–13
24	January 18	@ Oshkosh	38–55	10–14
25	January 24	Fort Wayne	64–60 (OT)	11–14
26	January 26	Anderson	55–50	12–14
27	January 31	Syracuse	62–60	13–14
28	February 5	@ Tri-Cities	61–57 (OT)	14–14
29	February 6	@ Sheboygan	59–60	14–15
30	February 7	Detroit	76–44	15–15
31	February 9	Indianapolis	55–47	16–15
32	February 10	@ Youngstown	64–52	17–15
33	February 11	@ Detroit	58–53	18–15
34	February 12	@ Toledo	55–57	18–16
35	February 13	@ Syracuse	61–50	19–16
36	February 14	Toledo	72–50	20–16
37	February 16	Sheboygan	62–44	21–16
38	February 20	@ Indianapolis	64–46	22–16
39	February 21	Rochester	57–56	23–16
40	February 23	Oshkosh	52–54	23–17
—	February 24	@ Buffalo	Cancelled	
41†	February 25	@ Rochester	39–41 (2OT; Protested)	23–18†
41/42	March 2	Youngstown	65–52	24–17 (24–18†)
42/43	March 7	Tri-Cities	72–52	25–17 (25–18†)
43/44	March 9	@ Fort Wayne	69–62	26–17 (26–18†)
44*	March 13	@ Rochester	55–75	26–18*

Each team would play each other a total of four times for 2 home and road games each for 44 total regular season NBL matches for this particular season of play. However, due to the unique circumstances involved for this season of play, the games that Chicago originally intended to play for the Buffalo Bisons this season would instead either be cancelled (with make-up games being rescheduled into newer, more proper dates following the Buffalo Bisons moving to Moline, Illinois nearby where the American Gears played) or would otherwise be played on the original dates the Bisons were meant to play on for the newly-named Tri-Cities Blackhawks to take on that date as their new opponent instead, depending on the specific circumstances involved, with one home game being considered more of a neutral site for the American Gears instead due to them playing that specific match in nearby Moline, Illinois (who would host the Tri-Cities Blackhawks) and one road match against the Rochester Royals being replayed at a later date due to the double-overtime format used for that match deviating from the typical overtime format at hand into a sudden-death overtime format where the first team to score would win the entire match without much warning being given out.

== NBL Playoffs ==
=== NBL Western Division Opening Round ===
(2W) Indianapolis Kautskys vs. (3/4W) Chicago American Gears: Chicago wins series 3–2

- Game 1: March 18, 1947 @ Indianapolis: Chicago 74, Indianapolis 72
- Game 2: March 20, 1947 @ Indianapolis: Chicago 69, Indianapolis 61
- Game 3: March 23, 1947 @ Chicago: Indianapolis 68, Chicago 67
- Game 4: March 25, 1947 @ Chicago: Indianapolis 55, Chicago 54
- Game 5: March 26, 1947 @ Chicago: Chicago 76, Indianapolis 62

=== NBL Western Division Semifinals ===
(1W) Oshkosh All-Stars vs. (3/4W) Chicago American Gears: Chicago wins series 2–0

- Game 1: March 27, 1947 @ Chicago: Chicago 60, Oshkosh 54
- Game 2: March 29, 1947 @ Oshkosh: Chicago 61, Oshkosh 60

=== NBL Championship ===
(1E) Rochester Royals vs. (3/4W) Chicago American Gears: Chicago wins series 3–1

- Game 1: April 3, 1947 @ Rochester: Rochester 71, Chicago 65
- Game 2: April 5, 1947 @ Rochester: Chicago 67, Rochester 63
- Game 3: April 7, 1947 @ Chicago: Chicago 78, Rochester 70
- Game 4: April 9, 1947 @ Chicago: Chicago 79, Rochester 68

== Awards and honors ==
- All-NBL First Team – Bobby McDermott and George Mikan
- All-NBL Second Team – Bob Calihan
- NBL All-Time Team – Bobby McDermott and George Mikan

== Chicago Departs the NBL for the PBLA ==
Following the conclusion of the 1946–47 NBL season, the owner of the Chicago American Gears, Maurice White of the American Gear Company, expressed great anger at the NBL for deciding to allow for new Indianapolis Kautskys co-owner Paul Walk to become the new president of the NBL over him. As such, White let the NBL know late in the summer that he was going to let the defending NBL champion Chicago American Gears defect from the NBL in order to create his own rivaling professional basketball league similar to not just the NBL, but also the rivaling American Basketball League and recently created Basketball Association of America that would prove to be very ambitious in scope called the Professional Basketball League of America. Initially, 32 teams were to have been planned for the new league (including themselves), but 16 were ultimately utilized for what became its only season of play. The PBLA's season began on October 25 with a close 44–43 win by the Atlanta Crackers over the Oklahoma City Drillers (with the American Gears debuting on Halloween 1947 six days later with a 59–49 win over the St. Paul Saints), but ended on November 13 due to the league declaring bankruptcy after stated losses of $600,000 (in a time where houses were under $7,000) following the previous day's games, which included the American Gears getting a perfect 8–0 record by a 65–56 score over the Louisville Colonels and the Chattanooga Majors winning a close 48–46 match over the Atlanta Crackers. Following the PBLA's demise, a vote was held by the NBL at the Morrison Hotel in Chicago on November 16 for whether to admit the American Gears back into the NBL despite already starting the 1947–48 NBL season, but the teams ultimately decided against that team's return into the league, regardless of actual circumstances in mind, in part due to other team owners disliking Maurice White in spite of his creativity in mind.

== NBL Dispersal Draft ==
Following the NBL's vote on what to do with the American Gears franchise on November 16, a dispersal draft of sorts was held for the remaining NBL teams already in the 1947–48 NBL season either later that same day or the following day afterward on November 17. When the dispersal draft officially happened, the Minneapolis Lakers (working off of the previous 4–40 record held by the Detroit Gems predecessor team) would select superstar center George Mikan to help alter the course of professional basketball forever. In addition to that, the newly-established Flint Dow A.C.'s (formerly known as the Midland Dow Chemicals works team and later became the Midland Dow A.C.'s) would pick up Bob Calihan, Price Brookfield went to the Anderson Duffey Packers, Bruce Hale went to the Indianapolis Kautskys, and Bobby McDermott went to the Sheboygan Red Skins. Other players from the American Gears franchise at that time would also be dispersed to other NBL teams outside of the Fort Wayne Zollner Pistons, who decided not to select anyone from the former Chicago American Gears franchise onto their roster whatsoever (though they would later sign Dick Triptow onto their team), such as Billy Hassett returning to the Tri-Cities Blackhawks after previously leaving the team and the NBL for a shot at the new league ran by the American Gears' owner, Fritz Nagy going to the Indianapolis Kautskys, Les Rothman going to the Syracuse Nationals, George Ratkovicz going to the Rochester Royals, Stan Patrick going to the Toledo Jeeps, Max Morris going to the Sheboygan Red Skins, and Bill McDonald going to the Oshkosh All-Stars.
