= 1946–47 Oshkosh All-Stars season =

NBL professional basketball team season

- Division champions
- Head coach: Lon Darling
- General manager: Lon Darling
- Owner: Lon Darling
- Arena: South Park School Gymnasium

Results
- Record: 28–16 (.636)
- Place: Division: 1st (Western)
- Playoff finish: Lost Western Division Semifinals to Chicago American Gears, 2–0; Lost WPBT third place match 86–67 to Fort Wayne Zollner Pistons

The 1946–47 Oshkosh All-Stars season was the All-Stars' tenth year in the United States' National Basketball League (NBL), which was also the tenth year the league existed. However, if one were to include the independent seasons they played starting all the way back in 1929 before beginning their NBL tenure in 1937, this would officially be their seventeenth season of play. This season saw the NBL hold the most teams in league history since the NBL's inaugural season of existence, with twelve total teams being held through five additional teams being added (the Anderson Duffey Packers, the Buffalo Bisons later turned Tri-Cities Blackhawks, the Detroit Gems, the Syracuse Nationals, and the Toledo Jeeps) in exchange for the Cleveland Allmen Transfers leaving the NBL entirely for good, with three of these five new teams still existing (albeit under different team names) to this very day in a different professional basketball league altogether. As such, Oshkosh would compete in the Western Division once again, with six teams representing the Eastern Division and six teams (including Oshkosh) representing the Western Division. The All-Stars played their home games at the South Park School Gymnasium in the South Park Middle School within the Oshkosh Area School District, which would be the first known season where it would become an immediate problem for the team since this season was also the first season where they hosted multiple neutral-area games within the state of Wisconsin via places like Milwaukee, the Wisconsin Rapids, and De Pere, with more Wisconsin cities being added for them to play in by later seasons.

At the start of the season, Oshkosh was not considered a frontrunner in the Western Division. The Anderson Duffey Packers and Indianapolis Kautskys were seen as contenders for the top spot. However, the performance of both Indiana-based teams allowed Oshkosh to have a realistic shot at winning the Western Division. While the All-Stars performance did not demonstrate consistent leadership throughout the season (notably around the middle of the season when they were 12–8 and then at 17–13), a late season push where they finished the season with an 11–3 conclusion gave Oshkosh just enough of a lead in their season to finish first in the Western Division with 28–16. This was the first time they became division champions since 1942 when the NBL technically abandoned the divisional formatting entirely for regular season championships and the sixth overall time the All-Stars were named divisional/regular season champions. This would lead to Oshkosh having yet another opening round playoff series against their cityside rivals in the Sheboygan Red Skins (who were also close to them in the playoff competition, but not quite close enough to take first place from them due to them tying the Chicago American Gears instead) one last time, with the All-Stars still technically not obtaining home court advantage due to some tiebreaker rules that went down. Luckily for Oshkosh, the home court advantage led to a reverse sweep through the Red Skins winning the two games played in Oshkosh and the All-Stars winning the three games played in Sheboygan. However, their playoff luck could not continue when they met up with the now-clicking Chicago American Gears (who got star players George Mikan and player-coach Bobby McDermott to finally click together after dealing with early issues in their season from within the team), as Oshkosh would be swept by the eventual champions 2–0 in the Western Division Semifinals. Despite not being able to get the championship for the NBL Playoffs this season (which was the only championship they would have been considered for this season by the NBL's commissioner, Ward Lambert, since he only considered the regular season champions (the Rochester Royals) to be the official champions that season, which was the only time such a ruling happened in the NBL), Lon Darling would be named the NBL Coach of the Year once again for his work on getting the All-Stars back to being Western Division champions, with Bob Carpenter being named a member of the All-NBL Second Team to go with it.

In addition to the NBL Playoffs, the Oshkosh All-Stars also competed in the 1947 World Professional Basketball Tournament, which later became the last time they would ever participate in the WPBT during its entire history. For some odd reason, despite them having very good history in the WPBT as well having a better record in the Western Division for the NBL this season than the Indianapolis Kautskys, it would be Indianapolis that would be given a first round bye alongside the three-time defending WPBT champion Fort Wayne Zollner Pistons instead of Oshkosh for some odd reason. With that being said, regardless of why the Kautskys got the first round bye over the All-Stars this time around, Oshkosh would still end up doing well early on against both the Herkimer Mohawk Redskins (who would not be related to the Sheboygan Red Skins whatsoever) and the Sheboygan Red Skins during the first two rounds of the event. However, when the All-Stars finally got to compete against the Indianapolis Kautskys in the semifinal round, it would be Indianapolis (a team that had never won in the WPBT before this particular event began) that would end up blowing out Oshkosh instead of it being the other way around for what would later become the Kautskys' Cinderella championship run in that tournament. Not only that, but the All-Stars would end up losing their third place consolation prize match to the Fort Wayne Zollner Pistons (the team that previously beat them in the 1946 WPBT championship series round) in a similar blowout manner, thus ending Oshkosh's WPBT history with a whimper.

== Draft picks ==
Entering this season, the National Basketball League would utilize their own draft system that would be considered similar to what the NFL has done for the NFL draft. As such, the 1946 NBL draft would be considered the first ever professional basketball draft ever done, even before the 1947 BAA draft that was done by the soon to be rivaling Basketball Association of America. Because of that fact, the Oshkosh All-Stars would participate in the inaugural 1946 NBL draft, which had occurred sometime during the 1946–47 season's offseason period before that season officially began for the NBL. However, as of 2026, no records of what the All-Stars' draft picks might have been for the NBL have properly come up, with any information on who those selections might have been for Oshkosh being lost to time in the process.

== Roster ==
1946–47 Oshkosh All-Stars roster
Players

Pos.	No.	Player	Height	Weight	DOB	From
F/C		Bob Carpenter	6 ft 5 in (1.96 m)	200 lb (91 kg)	1917–11–06	East Texas A&M
C		Leroy Edwards	6 ft 5 in (1.96 m)	210 lb (95 kg)	1914–04–11	Kentucky
F/C		Gene Englund	6 ft 5 in (1.96 m)	205 lb (93 kg)	1917–10–21	Wisconsin
G		Ken Exel	6 ft 1 in (1.85 m)	178 lb (81 kg)	1920–09–12	Minnesota
G		Ted Fritsch	5 ft 10 in (1.78 m)	210 lb (95 kg)	1920–10–31	UW–Stevens Point
G/F		Bob Kramer	6 ft 3 in (1.91 m)	185 lb (84 kg)	1922–04–23	Hammond Tech HS (IN)
F		Jack Maddox	6 ft 3 in (1.91 m)	185 lb (84 kg)	1919–12–10	West Texas State
G/F		Bill McDonald	6 ft 3 in (1.91 m)	190 lb (86 kg)	1916–11–05	Marquette
G/F		Billy Reed	5 ft 11 in (1.80 m)	185 lb (84 kg)	1922–11–12	Shawano HS (WI)
G/F		Eddie Riska	6 ft 0 in (1.83 m)	175 lb (79 kg)	1919–10–04	Notre Dame
G/F		Don Smith	6 ft 2 in (1.88 m)	190 lb (86 kg)	1920–07–27	Minnesota
G/F		Bob Sullivan	6 ft 0 in (1.83 m)	180 lb (82 kg)	1921–07–01	Wisconsin
G/F		Ralph Vaughn	6 ft 1 in (1.85 m)	175 lb (79 kg)	1918–02–12	USC
C		Clint Wager	6 ft 6 in (1.98 m)	210 lb (95 kg)	1920–01–20	Saint Mary's (MN)

Coaches
Head coach
- Lon Darling

Legend
- (DP) Unsigned draft pick
- (FA) Free agent
- (S) Suspended
- Injured

Roster

Note: Ken Exel, Bob Kramer, Billy Reed, and Don Smith were not a part of the playoff roster for this season.

== Regular season ==
=== Season standings ===
Pos.	Western Division	Wins	Losses	Win %
1	Oshkosh All-Stars	28	16	.636
2	Indianapolis Kautskys	27	17	.614
T–3	Chicago American Gears	26	18	.591
T–3	Sheboygan Red Skins	26	18	.591
5	Anderson Duffey Packers	24	20	.545
6	Detroit Gems	4	40	.091

=== NBL Schedule ===
Not to be confused with exhibition or other non-NBL scheduled games that did not count towards Oshkosh's official NBL record for this season. An official database created by John Grasso detailing every NBL match possible (outside of two matches that the Kankakee Gallagher Trojans won over the Dayton Metropolitans in 1938) would be released in 2026 showcasing every team's official schedules throughout their time spent in the NBL. As such, these are the official results recorded for the Oshkosh All-Stars during their tenth season in the NBL.

#	Date	Opponent	Score	Record
1	November 9	Chicago	66–61	1–0
2	November 12	@ Indianapolis	47–51	1–1
3	November 16	Sheboygan	55–49	2–1
4	November 23	Anderson	64–66	2–2
5	November 30	Detroit	63–53	3–2
6	December 7	Syracuse	74–43	4–2
7	December 9	N Buffalo	67–57	5–2
8	December 10	N Toledo	71–48	6–2
9	December 11	@ Chicago	44–41	7–2
10	December 14	Fort Wayne	71–50	8–2
11	December 15	@ Fort Wayne	60–77	8–3
12	December 16	@ Anderson	64–66	8–4
13	December 21	Rochester	63–58	9–4
14	December 28	Toledo	61–59	10–4
15	January 2	@ Youngstown	48–54 (OT)	10–5
16	January 4	Indianapolis	45–38	11–5
17	January 9	@ Sheboygan	52–54	11–6
18	January 11	Youngstown	62–55	12–6
—	January 13	@ Buffalo	Cancelled	
19	January 14	@ Rochester	58–73	12–7
20	January 16	@ Syracuse	49–67	12–8
21	January 18	Chicago	55–38	13–8
22	January 22	@ Fort Wayne	57–50	14–8
23	January 24	@ Indianapolis	33–59	14–9
24	January 25	Detroit	69–55	15–9
25	January 27	N Detroit	71–58	16–9
26	February 1	Syracuse	46–50	16–10
27	February 2	@ Sheboygan	58–67	16–11
28	February 6	@ Syracuse	53–54	16–12
29	February 8	Sheboygan	53–51 (OT)	17–12
30	February 11	@ Tri-Cities	47–53	17–13
—	February 12	@ Buffalo	Cancelled	
31	February 13	@ Youngstown	54–50	18–13
32	February 15	Toledo	59–50	19–13
33	February 19	Rochester	60–53	20–13
34	February 20	@ Anderson	61–60	21–13
35	February 22	@ Indianapolis	54–59	21–14
36	February 23	@ Chicago	54–52	22–14
37	February 26	Fort Wayne	57–55	23–14
38	March 1	Youngstown	71–55	24–14
39	March 3	@ Tri-Cities	46–41	25–14
40	March 5	N Detroit	70–49	26–14
41	March 8	Tri-Cities	54–40	27–14
42	March 11	@ Rochester	68–76	27–15
43	March 13	@ Toledo	65–85	27–16
44	March 15	Anderson	55–52	28–16

== NBL Playoffs ==
=== NBL Western Division Opening Round ===
(1W) Oshkosh All-Stars vs. (3/4W) Sheboygan Red Skins: Oshkosh wins series 3–2

- Game 1: March 18, 1947 @ Oshkosh: Sheboygan 54, Oshkosh 48
- Game 2: March 19, 1947 @ Oshkosh: Sheboygan 40, Oshkosh 35
- Game 3: March 20, 1947 @ Sheboygan: Oshkosh 53, Sheboygan 44
- Game 4: March 21, 1947 @ Sheboygan: Oshkosh 53, Sheboygan 45
- Game 5: March 22, 1947 @ Sheboygan: Oshkosh 49, Sheboygan 47

=== NBL Western Division Semifinals ===
(1W) Oshkosh All-Stars vs. (3/4W) Chicago American Gears: Chicago wins series 2–0

- Game 1: March 27, 1947 @ Chicago: Chicago 60, Oshkosh 54
- Game 2: March 29, 1947 @ Oshkosh: Chicago 61, Oshkosh 60

=== Awards and honors ===
- NBL Coach of the Year – Lon Darling
- Second Team All-NBL – Bob Carpenter
- NBL All-Time Team – Bob Carpenter, Leroy Edwards, and Gene Englund

== World Professional Basketball Tournament ==
For the ninth straight year in a row (and what later turned out to be their final year ever), the Oshkosh All-Stars would participate in the annual World Professional Basketball Tournament in Chicago, which the 1947 event was held on April 7–11, 1947 and was mostly held by a mixture of NBL and independently ran teams alongside the defending champions from the rivaling American Basketball League in the Baltimore Bullets and the Portland Indians from the short-lived Pacific Coast Professional Basketball League. In the first round, Oshkosh would have a close match with the Herkimer Mohawk Redskins (who would not be related in any way with the Sheboygan Red Skins) before ultimately winning with a 60–54 final score. In the quarterfinal round, the All-Stars would have a Western Division opening round rematch with their cityside rivals in the Sheboygan Red Skins, with this being their second match against each other in the WPBT's history after previously competing against each other in the semifinal round of the inaugural WPBT held back in 1939. Unlike the previous WPBT match Oshkosh had played against Sheboygan, which had been a blowout, the two teams would manage to be competitive against each other throughout most of the match, though the All-Stars would eliminate the Red Skins once again in a competitive tournament setting, this time defeating them with a 53–44 victory. After that match, Oshkosh would go up against the Indianapolis Kautskys, a team that had previously never won a game in the WPBT before this particular event occurred when they beat the Tri-Cities Blackhawks in the quarterfinal round after weirdly being given a first round bye alongside the three-time defending WPBT champion Fort Wayne Zollner Pistons over the Oshkosh All-Stars for some odd reason despite neither having great history there nor having a better NBL record this season. While the All-Stars had looked to live up to their name and showcase why they should have earned the first round bye over Indianapolis, it would be the Kautskys that would be more experienced and prepared this time around instead of Oshkosh, as they would end up being blown out in an upsetting 38–59 defeat to have Indianapolis qualify for the championship round while the All-Stars had to manage with a potential consolation third-place finish. Finally, with the third place consolation prize game, Oshkosh would see an interesting surprise occur when they got to see the three-time defending WPBT champion Fort Wayne Zollner Pistons (who they had likely hoped to have meet up again in the championship round for a rematch of 1946's series) get showcased as their opponent after the Zollner Pistons were surprisingly eliminated by another Cinderella team of sorts in this event in the Toledo Jeeps (who ultimately ended up losing to the Indianapolis Kautskys in the championship round, though they weirdly got the WPBT MVP this time around in player-coach Jule Rivlin). While this rematch would return to a single game elimination format this time around after previously using a best-of-three series the previous year (which likely robbed the All-Stars of getting their second WPBT championship), they would end up being blown out by Fort Wayne in what would turn out to be their final game played in the WPBT's history with a massive 67–86 defeat spelling an official end to their tenure in the WPBT. Despite Oshkosh going as far as the third place consolation prize round this time around, none of the All-Stars' players would surprisingly be named a member of the All-Tournament Team this time around.

=== Games ===
- Won first round (60–54) over Herkimer Mohawk Redskins
- Won quarterfinal round (53–44) over Sheboygan Red Skins
- Lost semifinal round (38–59) to Indianapolis Kautskys
- Lost third place consolation prize game (67–86) to Fort Wayne Zollner Pistons
