= 1946–47 Indianapolis Kautskys season =

NBL professional basketball team season

- Head coach: Ernie Andres (player-coach; 20–13 + WPBT); Bob Dietz & Herm Schaefer (interim player-coaches; 7–4 + Playoffs)
- General manager: Frank Kautsky; Abe Goldsmith
- Owner(s): Frank Kautsky; Paul A. Walk
- Arena: Butler Fieldhouse

Results
- Record: 27–17 (.614)
- Place: Division: 2nd (Western)
- Playoff finish: Lost Western Division opening round to Chicago American Gears, 3–2; Won 1947 World Professional Basketball Tournament's Championship Match 62–47 over the Toledo Jeeps

The 1946–47 Indianapolis Kautskys season was the sixth professional basketball season of play that the Kautskys franchise would not only utilize that name for their team, but also played in the United States' National Basketball League (NBL), which was also the tenth year the league existed. However, if you include their previous three seasons where they played in predecessor leagues of sorts in the National Professional Basketball League and the Midwest Basketball Conference, as well as the independent seasons they had in their history (including the three years they appeared in the World Professional Basketball Tournament where they played as the Indianapolis Pure Oils and Indianapolis Oilers during the World War II era), this would actually be their twelfth (or fifteenth) season of play as the Kautskys within the wild history of the NBL. Twelve teams competed in the NBL in the 1946–47 season, six teams in each of the Eastern and Western Divisions (including the Indianapolis Kautskys in the Western Division), after five new NBL teams (including future NBA teams in the Syracuse Nationals, Detroit Gems (later Minneapolis Lakers), and Buffalo Bisons turned Tri-Cities Blackhawks) joined the league and the Cleveland Allmen Transfers left the league entirely. This would help bring the NBL back up to its strongest point of competition as a league in terms of teams since its first season of existence as the NBL when it had twelve official teams in its league (with one of them rebranding themselves after playing three inaugural regular season games), only it would have more years of experience and more preparation under its belt now. However, it would also be the point where the NBL would face its strongest competition against other professional basketball leagues in not just the older American Basketball League, but also the recently created Basketball Association of America.

The Kautskys entered this season under a pessimistic tone at first after closing out their previous season by finishing dead last in the Western Division with a 10–22 record and having the second-worst overall record in the league behind only the Cleveland Allmen Transfers, who had already left the NBL before this season began. However, Indianapolis would start this season out with having their best start in a season under the NBL name throughout its history by having both a 9–1 and 10–2 start to their season (though ending the 1946 year with an 11–5 record), thanks in part to improvements with their roster that included center Arnie Risen growing into a star player for them (as noted by him being an All-NBL Second Team player this season) and player-coach Ernie Andres becoming a better player-coach for them than Nat Hickey was from the previous season. While the Kautskys could not keep up the hot start they had throughout the early portion of the season (similar to a few other NBL teams this season that coincidentally were a part of the Western Division this season), they would showcase themselves as being one of the stronger and overall better-looking teams in the NBL this season (despite them replacing player-coach Ernie Andres near the end of the season with a combination of Bob Dietz and Herm Schaefer for the head coach role) by having a 27–17 record (which would be one game shy of tying the Oshkosh All-Stars for first place in the Western Division, but would be one game ahead of both the Sheboygan Red Skins and Chicago American Gears for a tied third-place position), which would be good enough for a second-place finish for this season despite them being the last of the four teams to lose to the Detroit Gems this season. This led to them playing as a team with home-court advantage in what would be the newly created opening round for the Western Division in the NBL Playoffs, with their opponent in that opening round being the Chicago American Gears. Despite the Kautskys looking to be competitive against the surprising strength of that team throughout that best of five series, Indianapolis would ultimately fall short against the American Gears under the combined strength of George Mikan and player-coach Bobby McDermott, eventually losing that series 3–2, with Chicago eventually winning the NBL championship for that season (though they weirdly were only deemed champions for the NBL Playoffs by the NBL's commissioner, Ward Lambert, since he only considered the regular season champions (the Rochester Royals) to be the official champions that season, which was the only time such a ruling happened in the NBL).

The Indianapolis Kautskys would also compete in the 1947 World Professional Basketball Tournament, looking to at least get their first ever victory in that event when they had never won a single game throughout the WPBT's entire history up until this point in time. They weirdly were given a first round bye alongside the three-time WPBT champions in the Fort Wayne Zollner Pistons, despite neither having positive history within the WPBT up until this point in time nor did they have the best record in their division in the NBL this season. Regardless of the reasons for why they got a first round bye, it would ultimately help them out with getting their first victory in that tournament by winning against the Tri-Cities Blackhawks in the quarterfinal round. However, they wouldn't just stop at getting a victory at the quarterfinal round in this year's tournament; they would also get to defeat the Oshkosh All-Stars (a team who actually had the best record in the Western Division this season in the NBL) in the semifinal round before defeating the Toledo Jeeps in the championship round. This prior history in the WPBT combined with the Kautskys' previous season of play both in the NBL and in previous years in the WPBT would lead to the team having what could be considered a complete Cinderella run in the WPBT this season, even if they couldn't complete it with a championship won in the NBL this season. Weirdly enough, however, despite the success they had in the WPBT, none of the Kautskys' players would be named the MVP of that year's tournament, with it going to the player-coach of the losing team in the final round, Jule Rivlin of the Toledo Jeeps, due to his own leadership skills in giving that team their own impressive Cinderella run in that event up until the final round.

== Draft picks ==
Entering this season, the National Basketball League would utilize their own draft system that would be considered similar to what the NFL has done for the NFL draft. As such, the 1946 NBL draft would be considered the first ever professional basketball draft ever done, even before the 1947 BAA draft that was done by the soon to be rivaling Basketball Association of America. Because of that fact, the Indianapolis Kautskys would participate in the inaugural 1946 NBL draft, which had occurred sometime during the 1946–47 season's offseason period before that season officially began for the NBL. However, as of 2026, no records of what the Kautskys' draft picks might have been for the NBL have properly come up, with any information on who those selections might have been for Indianapolis likely being lost to time in the process.

== Roster ==
1946–47 Indianapolis Kautskys roster
Players

Pos.	No.	Player	Height	Weight	DOB	From
G/F		Ernie Andres	6 ft 1 in (1.85 m)	200 lb (91 kg)	1920–05–11	Indiana
F		Bill Closs	6 ft 5 in (1.96 m)	195 lb (88 kg)	1922–01–08	Rice
G/F		Bob Dietz	6 ft 1 in (1.85 m)	164 lb (74 kg)	1917–12–04	Butler
F		Gus Doerner	6 ft 2 in (1.88 m)	190 lb (86 kg)	1922–02–27	Evansville
F/C		Lowell Galloway	6 ft 4 in (1.93 m)	210 lb (95 kg)	1921–07–07	Evansville
G/F		Leo Klier	6 ft 2 in (1.88 m)	170 lb (77 kg)	1923–05–21	Notre Dame
G/F		Woody Norris	6 ft 1 in (1.85 m)	170 lb (77 kg)	1919–06–18	Butler
C		Arnie Risen	6 ft 9 in (2.06 m)	200 lb (91 kg)	1924–10–09	Ohio State
G/F		Herm Schaefer	6 ft 0 in (1.83 m)	175 lb (79 kg)	1918–12–20	Indiana
G/F		Don Smith	6 ft 2 in (1.88 m)	190 lb (86 kg)	1920–07–27	Minnesota
F/C		Homer Thompson	6 ft 4 in (1.93 m)	215 lb (98 kg)	1916–01–18	Kentucky

Coaches
Head coach
- Ernie Andres
- Bob Dietz
- Herm Schaefer

Legend
- (DP) Unsigned draft pick
- (FA) Free agent
- (S) Suspended
- Injured

Roster

Note: Don Smith and Homer Thompson were not on the team's playoff roster.

== Regular season ==
=== Season standings ===
Pos.	Western Division	Wins	Losses	Win %
1	Oshkosh All-Stars	28	16	.636
2	Indianapolis Kautskys	27	17	.614
T–3	Chicago American Gears	26	18	.591
T–3	Sheboygan Red Skins	26	18	.591
5	Anderson Duffey Packers	24	20	.545
6	Detroit Gems	4	40	.091

=== NBL Schedule ===
Not to be confused with exhibition or other non-NBL scheduled games that did not count towards Indianapolis' official NBL record for this season. An official database created by John Grasso detailing every NBL match possible (outside of two matches that the Kankakee Gallagher Trojans won over the Dayton Metropolitans in 1938) would be released in 2026 showcasing every team's official schedules throughout their time spent in the NBL. As such, these are the official results recorded for the Indianapolis Kautskys during their sixth season in the NBL (second season in their second return) under that name for the league.

#	Date	Opponent	Score	Record
1	November 12	Oshkosh	51–47	1–0
2	November 19	Youngstown	71–64	2–0
3	November 24	@ Fort Wayne	55–57 (OT)	2–1
4	November 26	Sheboygan	55–51	3–1
5	November 30	@ Syracuse	62–59	4–1
6	December 2	@ Anderson	53–52	5–1
7	December 3	Rochester	59–58	6–1
8	December 6	Anderson	56–49	7–1
9	December 9	N Toledo	62–58	8–1
10	December 10	Fort Wayne	65–39	9–1
11	December 14	@ Toledo	56–64	9–2
12	December 17	Detroit	55–42	10–2
13	December 21	@ Youngstown	64–66 (OT)	10–3
14	December 26	Chicago	67–59	11–3
15	December 28	@ Rochester	48–57	11–4
—	December 30‡	@ Buffalo	Cancelled	
16	December 30‡	@ Syracuse	49–56	11–5
17	January 1	@ Sheboygan	46–45	12–5
18	January 3	@ Chicago	58–57 (OT)	13–5
19	January 4	@ Oshkosh	38–45	13–6
20	January 7	Anderson	73–54	14–6
21	January 9	@ Youngstown	54–50	15–6
22	January 14	Tri-Cities	70–57	16–6
23	January 16	@ Detroit	55–56	16–7
24	January 21	Syracuse	57–52	17–7
25	January 24	Oshkosh	59–33	18–7
26	January 28	Sheboygan	63–43	19–7
27	February 2	@ Rochester	66–74	19–8
—	February 3	@ Buffalo	Cancelled	
28	February 4	Toledo	44–42	20–8
29	February 5	@ Fort Wayne	48–56	20–9
30	February 9	@ Chicago	47–55	20–10
31	February 11	Rochester	47–50	20–11
32	February 14	Tri-Cities	52–55	20–12
33	February 15	@ Tri-Cities	40–43	20–13
34	February 16	@ Detroit	52–42	21–13
35	February 18	Syracuse	59–46	22–13
36	February 20	Chicago	48–64	22–14
37	February 22	@ Oshkosh	59–54	23–14
38	February 23	@ Sheboygan	44–56	23–15
39	February 25	Detroit	83–41	24–15
40	March 4	Youngstown	71–48	25–15
41	March 6	@ Tri-Cities	55–72	25–16
42	March 10	@ Toledo	58–45	26–16
43	March 11	Fort Wayne	67–56	27–16
44	March 13	@ Anderson	61–68	27–17

‡ – The December 30, 1946 game that Indianapolis had originally intended to have played was against the Buffalo Bisons in Buffalo, New York, but due to the team moving to Moline, Illinois to become the Tri-Cities Blackhawks for the rest of the season a few days earlier on Christmas Day (December 25), that game would ultimately be cancelled, meaning that at least both road schedules for the Indianapolis Kautskys and the Anderson Duffey Packers (and by extension, the Syracuse Nationals' home schedule) ultimately got affected for this season due to the mid-season team change for this season.

== NBL Playoffs ==
=== NBL Western Division Opening Round ===
(2W) Indianapolis Kautskys vs. (3/4W) Chicago American Gears: Chicago wins series 3–2

- Game 1: March 18, 1947 @ Indianapolis: Chicago 74, Indianapolis 72
- Game 2: March 20, 1947 @ Indianapolis: Chicago 69, Indianapolis 61
- Game 3: March 23, 1947 @ Chicago: Indianapolis 68, Chicago 67
- Game 4: March 25, 1947 @ Chicago: Indianapolis 55, Chicago 54
- Game 5: March 26, 1947 @ Chicago: Chicago 76, Indianapolis 62

=== Awards and honors ===
- Second Team All-NBL – Arnie Risen
- NBL All-Time Team – Arnie Risen

== World Professional Basketball Tournament ==
For presumably the fourth time in franchise history (potentially going up to the seventh time if they played the 1943–1945 events under the Indianapolis Pure Oils and Indianapolis Oilers names despite being considered under hiatus at the time), the Indianapolis Kautskys would compete in the World Professional Basketball Tournament in Chicago, which saw the 1947 event being held on April 7–11, 1947 and consisted of 14 teams, most of which was an even mixture of independently ran teams and teams from the National Basketball League alongside the rivaling American Basketball League's defending champion Baltimore Bullets and the Portland Indians from the ultimately short-lived Pacific Coast Professional Basketball League. For some unknown reason, it would be the Indianapolis Kautskys that were given one of the two byes in the first round of the WPBT this year alongside the three-time defending WPBT champion Fort Wayne Zollner Pistons for a change of pace (despite the Kautskys neither finishing in first place in the Western Division this season nor finishing well in the NBL Playoffs this season, even if they did lose to the eventual NBL champions in the Chicago American Gears during the opening round by five games). Regardless of why exactly they were given a bye, the Kautskys would end up skipping the first round entirely and have their own first round match be in the quarterfinal round instead, with them facing off against the Tri-Cities Blackhawks, who only a few months prior were operating as the Buffalo Bisons in Buffalo, New York before moving to Moline, Illinois on Christmas Day in 1946 to operate under that team name for the rest of that season (as well as for the rest of their NBL tenure) going forward for their survival. While the Blackhawks would put up a good fight, it would ultimately be the Kautskys that would succeed in getting their first ever WPBT victory with a 65–56 finale to end the quarterfinal round.

In the semifinal round, Indianapolis faced the veteran-laden Oshkosh All-Stars in its bid for a surprise WPBT run. Although Oshkosh finished the season one game ahead of Indianapolis, the Kautskys were the stronger team in the matchup, defeating the All-Stars 59–38. Herm Schaefer led Indianapolis with 19 points, and Arnie Risen added 13, sending the Kautskys into the championship round with confidence for the NBL opponent awaiting them there.

Finally, in the championship round, the Kautskys would see themselves go up against the Toledo Jeeps, who had it by defeating the all-black New York Renaissance in the quarterfinal round, the Midland Dow Chemicals works team in the semifinal round, and the Fort Wayne Zollner Pistons in the semifinal round before meeting this Indianapolis roster for the championship round. Throughout the first half of the match, the Jeeps would keep things close, however, by the time the third quarter began, the Kautskys would rout Toledo throughout the entire second half, despite George Sobek scoring a game-high 20 points for the Jeeps, as the previously winless Indianapolis squad would end up winning their first (and only) WPBT championship with a 62–47 victory over the Jeeps Despite the championship, none of the Kautskys' own players would end up winning the WPBT's MVP award this year, as that would go to the Toledo Jeeps' player-coach Jule Rivlin instead. Despite the Kautskys not having any of their own players winning the WPBT MVP award this year, they would still see three of their own players be named members of the All-Tournament First Team in Leo Klier, Arnie Risen, and Herm Schaefer.

=== Scores ===
- Indianapolis had a bye in the first round.
- Won quarterfinal round (65–56) over the Tri-Cities Blackhawks
- Won semifinal round (59–38) over the Oshkosh All-Stars
- Won championship round (62–47) over the Toledo Jeeps

=== Awards and honors ===
- Leo Klier, All-Tournament First Team
- Arnie Risen, All-Tournament First Team
- Herm Schaefer, All-Tournament First Team
