= 1946–47 Sheboygan Red Skins season =

NBL professional basketball team season

- Head coach: Doxie Moore
- Arena: Sheboygan Municipal Auditorium and Armory

Results
- Record: 26–18 (.591)
- Place: Division: T–3rd (tied with Chicago American Gears) (Western)
- Playoff finish: Lost Western Division opening round (Oshkosh), 3–2

The 1946–47 Sheboygan Red Skins season was the Red Skins' ninth year in the United States' National Basketball League (NBL), which would also be the tenth year the NBL itself existed. However, if one were to include their few seasons they played as an independent team under a few various team names involving local businesses like the The Ballhorns (being sponsored by a local florist and funeral parlor), the Art Imigs (being sponsored by a local dry cleaning shop owned and operated by a man named Art Imig with team jerseys saying Art Imig's), and the Enzo Jels (being sponsored by a local gelatin manufacturer known as Enzo-Pac) at various points before becoming the Sheboygan Red Skins due to their promotion up into the NBL, this would officially be their fourteenth overall season of play as well. Entering this season, the NBL would have its highest success point being reached in the post-World War II era with twelve teams competing in the league, with five new teams being added into the league (three of which continue to play in the present-day in the NBA, albeit under different team names than what they first started by from this season of play), with only the Cleveland Allmen Transfers being lost entering the new season, with their spot being replaced by the Syracuse Nationals. As a result of this improvement of competition within the NBL, they would have twelve teams competing in the league, which was composed of six teams each in both the Eastern Division and the Western Division (which Sheboygan represented for the third straight season and its fifth overall season).

The Red Skins played their home games at the Sheboygan Municipal Auditorium and Armory. After having a below-average November to start out the season, Sheboygan would end up having a barely above-average finish for the 1946 year to get an 8–7 record, though they would later be 8–8 by New Year's Day in 1947, which made them feel unlikely to get into the newly expanded NBL Playoffs this season. That danger would continue by the end of January, where they did get an above-average 14–12 record, but were behind most of the Western Division teams this season. Luckily for them, Sheboygan would end their season with a 12–6 finish throughout February and March to get themselves a 26–18 record to tie themselves with the Chicago American Gears, who both surpassed the Anderson Duffey Packers for the last two playoff spots in the newly expanded Western Division, with Sheboygan being the #3 seed due to them (supposedly) grabbing the tiebreaker over Chicago this season. Because of that, they would go up against their cityside rivals in the Oshkosh All-Stars one more time, which saw Oshkosh be named the new Western Division champions, but Sheboygan would weirdly get the home court advantage over Oshkosh by comparison. Regardless of why that was the case, the Red Skins would end up being victims of another reverse sweep, with Sheboygan winning their first two games played against the All-Stars before Oshkosh ended up winning the final three games of the Western Division opening round to take that series 3–2 in a best-of-five series, though the Oshkosh All-Stars would later lose the Western Division Semifinals by being swept against the eventual NBL (playoff) champion Chicago American Gears, who had both young star center George Mikan and player-coach Bobby McDermott leading the team there. Following the season's conclusion, new rookie Fred Lewis would not only be named a part of the All-NBL First Team, but also was named the NBL's Rookie of the Year as well.

== Draft picks ==
Entering this season, the National Basketball League would utilize their own draft system that would be considered similar to what the NFL has done for the NFL draft. As such, the 1946 NBL draft would be considered the first ever professional basketball draft ever done, even before the 1947 BAA draft that was done by the soon to be rivaling Basketball Association of America. Because of that fact, the Sheboygan Red Skins would participate in the inaugural 1946 NBL draft, which had occurred sometime during the 1946–47 season's offseason period before that season officially began for the NBL. However, as of 2026, no records of what the Red Skins' draft picks might have been for the NBL have properly come up, with any information on who those selections might have been for Sheboygan being lost to time in the process.

== Roster ==
1946–47 Sheboygan Red Skins roster
Players

Pos.	No.	Player	Height	Weight	DOB	From
F/C		Max Biggs	6 ft 0 in (1.83 m)	190 lb (86 kg)	1923–06–15	Purdue
C		Ed Dancker	6 ft 7 in (2.01 m)	200 lb (91 kg)	1914–03–14	South Division HS (WI)
C		Jamie Dawson	6 ft 7 in (2.01 m)	210 lb (95 kg)	1922–07–09	Texas A&M
C		Bob Dykstra	6 ft 9 in (2.06 m)	230 lb (104 kg)	1922–05–31	Simpson
G/F		Al Grenert	6 ft 0 in (1.83 m)	190 lb (86 kg)	1919–07–08	NYU
G/F		Luther Harris	6 ft 3 in (1.91 m)	195 lb (88 kg)	1923–08–27	East Alton–Wood River HS (IL)
G		Bobby Holm	6 ft 0 in (1.83 m)	200 lb (91 kg)	1919–01–22	Seton Hall
G/F		Rube Lautenschlager	6 ft 2 in (1.88 m)	190 lb (86 kg)	1915–09–07	UW–Oshkosh
G/F		Fred Lewis	6 ft 2 in (1.88 m)	195 lb (88 kg)	1921–01–06	Eastern Kentucky
G/F		Al Lucas	6 ft 3 in (1.91 m)	195 lb (88 kg)	1922–07–04	Fordham
F		Pete Mount	6 ft 4 in (1.93 m)	200 lb (91 kg)	1925–03–10	Lebanon HS (IN)
F/C		Mike Novak	6 ft 9 in (2.06 m)	219 lb (99 kg)	1915–04–23	Loyola Chicago
G/F		Bill Schroeder	6 ft 0 in (1.83 m)	190 lb (86 kg)	1923–04–11	Wisconsin
G/F		Steve Sharkey	6 ft 0 in (1.83 m)	190 lb (86 kg)	1918–12–30	Nott Terrance HS (NY)
F/C		Bob Sims	6 ft 6 in (1.98 m)	220 lb (100 kg)	1915–07–03	Western Michigan
G		Ken Suesens	6 ft 1 in (1.85 m)	175 lb (79 kg)	1916–10–23	Iowa
F/C		Homer Thompson	6 ft 4 in (1.93 m)	215 lb (98 kg)	1916–01–18	Kentucky
F/C		Dean White	6 ft 7 in (2.01 m)	220 lb (100 kg)	1923–05–30	Valparaiso

Coaches
Head coach
- Doxie Moore

Legend
- (DP) Unsigned draft pick
- (FA) Free agent
- (S) Suspended
- Injured

Roster

Note: Jamie Dawson, Al Grenert, Pete Mount, Mike Novak, Bill Schroeder, Steve Sharkey, and Homer Thompson were not on the playoff roster, with Bob Sims also not joining them for the 1947 World Professional Basketball Tournament.

== Regular season ==
=== Season standings ===
Pos.	Western Division	Wins	Losses	Win %
1	Oshkosh All-Stars	28	16	.636
2	Indianapolis Kautskys	27	17	.614
T–3	Chicago American Gears	26	18	.591
T–3	Sheboygan Red Skins	26	18	.591
5	Anderson Duffey Packers	24	20	.545
6	Detroit Gems	4	40	.091

=== NBL Schedule ===
Not to be confused with exhibition or other non-NBL scheduled games that did not count towards Sheboygan's official NBL record for this season. An official database created by John Grasso detailing every NBL match possible (outside of two matches that the Kankakee Gallagher Trojans won over the Dayton Metropolitans in 1938) would be released in 2026 showcasing every team's official schedules throughout their time spent in the NBL. As such, these are the official results recorded for the Sheboygan Red Skins during their ninth season in the NBL.

#	Date	Opponent	Score	Record
1	November 16	@ Oshkosh	49–55	0–1
2	November 21	Anderson	72–54	1–1
3	November 25	@ Toledo	45–60	1–2
4	November 26	@ Indianapolis	51–55	1–3
5	November 28	Chicago	48–40	2–3
6	December 5	Syracuse	74–47	3–3
7	December 8	Detroit	50–37	4–3
8	December 12	Fort Wayne	65–56	5–3
9	December 14	@ Rochester	51–53	5–4
10	December 16	@ Buffalo	50–38	6–4
11	December 19	Rochester	52–59	6–5
12	December 22	@ Fort Wayne	57–69	6–6
13	December 23	@ Youngstown	48–67	6–7
14	December 26	Toledo	60–57	7–7
15	December 29	@ Chicago	63–58	8–7
16	January 1	Indianapolis	45–46	8–8
17	January 2	@ Anderson	64–80	8–9
18	January 9	Oshkosh	54–52	9–9
19	January 12	Youngstown	56–26	10–9
20	January 14	@ Anderson	60–63 (OT)	10–10
21	January 19	Detroit	62–49	11–10
22	January 20	@ Toledo	56–47	12–10
23	January 23	Anderson	47–44	13–10
24	January 26	@ Tri-Cities	52–47	14–10
25	January 28	@ Indianapolis	43–63	14–11
26	January 29	@ Fort Wayne	49–56	14–12
27	February 2	Oshkosh	67–58	15–12
28	February 6	Chicago	60–59	16–12
29	February 8	@ Oshkosh	51–53 (OT)	16–13
30	February 9	Detroit	59–52	17–13
31	February 12	@ Tri-Cities	48–54	17–14
32	February 13	Toledo	56–50	18–14
33	February 16	@ Chicago	44–62	18–15
34	February 20	Rochester	52–49	19–15
35	February 23	Indianapolis	56–44	20–15
36	February 27	Fort Wayne	57–52	21–15
37	March 2	Syracuse	63–61	22–15
—	March 3	@ Buffalo	Cancelled	
38	March 4	@ Rochester	55–65	22–16
39	March 6	Youngstown	59–49	23–16
40	March 7	N Detroit	57–42	24–16
41	March 9	@ Tri-Cities	60–50	25–16
42	March 11	@ Youngstown	45–44	26–16
43	March 12	@ Syracuse	40–63	26–17
44	March 13	@ Syracuse	48–55	26–18

== NBL Playoffs ==
=== NBL Western Division Opening Round ===
(3/4W) Sheboygan Red Skins vs. (1W) Oshkosh All-Stars: Oshkosh wins series 3–2

- Game 1: March 18, 1947 @ Oshkosh: Sheboygan 54, Oshkosh 48
- Game 2: March 19, 1947 @ Oshkosh: Sheboygan 40, Oshkosh 35
- Game 3: March 20, 1947 @ Sheboygan: Oshkosh 53, Sheboygan 44
- Game 4: March 21, 1947 @ Sheboygan: Oshkosh 53, Sheboygan 45
- Game 5: March 22, 1947 @ Sheboygan: Oshkosh 49, Sheboygan 47

=== Awards and honors ===
- First Team All-NBL – Fred Lewis
- NBL Rookie of the Year – Fred Lewis
- NBL All-Rookie Team – Fred Lewis
- All-Time NBL Team – Ed Dancker and Mike Novak

== World Professional Basketball Tournament ==
For the eighth time in nine years, the Sheboygan Red Skins would participate (for what later turned out to be for the last time) in the annual World Professional Basketball Tournament in Chicago, which the 1947 event was held on April 7–11, 1947 and was mostly held by a mixture of NBL teams and independently ran teams alongside the rivaling American Basketball League's defending champions in the Baltimore Bullets (who had a 34–3 record this season) and the Portland Indians from the short-lived Pacific Coast Professional Basketball League. Because the Red Skins weren't given a first round bye this time around (those specific byes were given out to both the three-time defending WPBT champions in the Fort Wayne Zollner Pistons and the Indianapolis Kautskys for some odd reason), Sheboygan would participate in the first round of the WPBT once again (for the first time since 1942), which saw the Red Skins going up against the runners-up for the PCPBL in the Portland Indians during the first round. Luckily, Sheboygan would make rather easy work of the Portland squad in question with a 27–5 fourth quarter romp after being down 43–35 by the third quarter, resulting in the Red Skins defeating the Indians with a 62–48 to showcase every NBL team (outside of the Syracuse Nationals) qualifying for the quarterfinal round. Once they returned to the quarterfinal round once again, Sheboygan would have one last playoff match of sorts against their cityside rivals in the Oshkosh All-Stars (who had defeated the unrelated Herkimer Mohawk Redskins from the recently created (and soon to be short-lived) New York State Professional Basketball League in the first round), which would also be a rematch of the Western Division opening round for this season's NBL Playoffs this time around. Unfortunately for the Sheboygan Red Skins, they would not be able to succeed in enacting their revenge upon the All-Stars this time around, as Oshkosh would end up easily defeating the Red Skins with a 53–44 final score, which led to Sheboygan's final elimination from the WPBT. Oshkosh would later be eliminated in a blowout manner by the semifinal round to the eventual new WPBT champions in the Indianapolis Kautskys (who had themselves a Cinderella run there after previously never winning a single WPBT match before this season), with the All-Stars also being blown out in the third place consolation prize round against the Fort Wayne Zollner Pistons.

=== Games ===
- Won first round (62–48) to the Portland Indians.
- Lost quarterfinal round (44–53) to the Oshkosh All-Stars.
