= 1946–47 Anderson Duffey Packers season =

NBL professional basketball team season

- Head coach: Murray Mendenhall (24–18); Ike W. Duffey (interim; 0–2)
- Owner(s): Ike W. Duffey; John B. Duffey; Duffey's Meat Packing, Inc.
- Arena: Anderson High School Wigwam

Results
- Record: 24–20 (.545)
- Place: Division: 5th (Western)
- Playoff finish: Did not qualify

The 1946–47 Anderson Duffey Packers season was the first professional season of play for the Duffey Packers in the small city of Anderson, Indiana under the National Basketball League, which officially was the tenth season that it existed as a professional basketball league after previously existing as a semi-pro or amateur basketball league called the Midwest Basketball Conference in its first two seasons back in 1935. However, if you include their only season of independent play as the Anderson Chiefs (which sometimes got their team name expanded out more into being the Chief Anderson Meat Packers at times due to their affiliation with the local meat packing business called Duffey's Incorporated that was owned by brothers Ike W. and John B. Duffey, who subsequently owned and operated the team as well) before joining the NBL, this would also be their second overall season of play. Originally, the Anderson Duffey Packers were the team that had obtained the last open spot for play in the NBL in the 1946–47 season, but when the Cleveland Allmen Transfers and Pittsburgh Raiders opted out on their positions of entry, it allowed for the Syracuse Nationals and Toledo Jeeps to be the last two teams to join in instead. Because of this, twelve teams would officially compete in the NBL for the 1946–47 season, which comprised six teams in both the Eastern and Western Divisions.

Before the season began (specifically when Anderson began their first exhibition game), team owner Ike W. Duffey ensured that the opposing teams received a fresh 15-pound ham from their local Duffey's Incorporated meat packing plant, which became a franchise tradition for the few seasons they would exist as a team. When the Anderson Duffey Packers made their NBL debut against the Detroit Gems at the Anderson High School Wigwam on November 11, 1946 (which Anderson ultimately won), the Duffey Packers would see many special guests appear there like Richard T. James (the lieutenant governor of Indiana); Buffalo Bisons (later Tri-Cities Blackhawks) team president Leo Ferris; Indianapolis Kautskys co-owners Frank Kautsky and Paul A. Walk; Oshkosh All-Stars head coach and NBL secretary-treasurer (and former NBL president) Lon Darling alongside every single member of the Oshkosh All-Stars, who were there to compete against the Indianapolis Katuskys for the upcoming match in Indianapolis the following night afterward (with that latter match ending with the Indianapolis Kautskys winning 51–47 over Oshkosh); NBL publicity directory Keith Brehm; Anderson mayor Clarence D. Rotruck and other city officials within the small city of Anderson. This alongside a 5–1 start in the month of November (with their only loss during that time being against the Sheboygan Red Skins on November 21) would help give the Duffey Packers an immediate fanbase within the small city of Anderson when the NBL already had two other teams in the state of Indiana at the time in the Fort Wayne Zollner Pistons and the (recently) twice-returning Indianapolis Kautskys to cheer for at the time. Unfortunately for the Duffey Packers, their first season in the NBL would have them competing in a very strong Western Division (meaning their strong start would not last for too long), where outside of the aforementioned Detroit Gems, every other team in that particular division had a respectable shot to at least earn a playoff spot that season, if not win the NBL's championship outright. Because of that fact, despite Anderson finishing the season with an above-average 24–20 record, the Duffey Packers would be eliminated from entering the NBL Playoffs in its first ever expanded format in their only season in the Western Division due to them being two games behind both the Sheboygan Red Skins and the eventual champions of the NBL that season, the Chicago American Gears. In addition to that, they would also compete in the 1947 World Professional Basketball Tournament, where they would end up losing in the quarterfinal round to the three-time defending WPBT champions of the event, the Fort Wayne Zollner Pistons.

== Draft picks ==
Entering this season, the National Basketball League would utilize their own draft system that would be considered similar to what the NFL has done for the NFL draft. As such, the 1946 NBL draft would be considered the first ever professional basketball draft ever done, even before the 1947 BAA draft that was done by the soon to be rivaling Basketball Association of America. Because of that fact, the Anderson Duffey Packers (formerly known as the Anderson Chiefs or the Chief Anderson Meat Packers) would participate in the inaugural 1946 NBL draft, which had occurred sometime during the 1946–47 season's offseason period before that season officially began for the NBL. However, as of 2026, no records of what Anderson's draft picks might have been for the NBL have properly come up (assuming Anderson would have even been ready for entry by the time the 1946 NBL draft began), with any information on who those selections might have been for Anderson (especially since the Anderson Duffey Packers franchise would be considered an expansion franchise for the NBL this season) being lost to time in the process.

== Roster ==
1946–47 Anderson Duffey Packers roster
Players

Pos.	No.	Player	Height	Weight	DOB	From
G/F		Bob Bolyard	6 ft 0 in (1.83 m)	182 lb (83 kg)	1920–12–04	Toledo
F/C		Jerry Bush	6 ft 3 in (1.91 m)	200 lb (91 kg)	1914–09–06	St. John's
G/F		Dick Furey	6 ft 3 in (1.91 m)	195 lb (88 kg)	1925–03–08	St. Thomas (MN)
F/C		Elmer Gainer	6 ft 6 in (1.98 m)	195 lb (88 kg)	1918–11–22	DePaul
F/C		Ben Gardner	6 ft 3 in (1.91 m)	190 lb (86 kg)	1919–10–18	Sam Houston State
G		Frank Gates	6 ft 0 in (1.83 m)	160 lb (73 kg)	1920–04–12	Sam Houston State
G/F		Bill Hapac	6 ft 2 in (1.88 m)	190 lb (86 kg)	1918–01–26	Illinois
G/F		Howie Hoffman	6 ft 4 in (1.93 m)	195 lb (88 kg)	1921–12–04	Purdue
F/C		Ed Lewinski	6 ft 4 in (1.93 m)	210 lb (95 kg)	1918–09–10	Bowen HS (IL)
G/F		Dale Morey	6 ft 1 in (1.85 m)	180 lb (82 kg)	1918–12–01	LSU
C		Howie Schultz	6 ft 8 in (2.03 m)	200 lb (91 kg)	1922–07–03	Hamline
G/F		Rollie Seltz	5 ft 10 in (1.78 m)	165 lb (75 kg)	1924–01–25	Hamline
G/F		Charley Shipp	6 ft 1 in (1.85 m)	200 lb (91 kg)	1913–12–03	Catholic
G		Ed Stanczak	6 ft 1 in (1.85 m)	185 lb (84 kg)	1921–08–15	Central HS (IN)
G		John Stanton	6 ft 0 in (1.83 m)	175 lb (79 kg)	1921–06–02	Loyola Chicago
G/F		Russ Wilkins	6 ft 1 in (1.85 m)	190 lb (86 kg)	1923–03–31	Tri-State College

Coaches
Head coach
- Murray Mendenhall

Legend
- (DP) Unsigned draft pick
- (FA) Free agent
- (S) Suspended
- Injured

Roster

== Regular season ==
=== Season standings ===
Pos.	Western Division	Wins	Losses	Win %
1	Oshkosh All-Stars	28	16	.636
2	Indianapolis Kautskys	27	17	.614
T–3	Chicago American Gears	26	18	.591
T–3	Sheboygan Red Skins	26	18	.591
5	Anderson Duffey Packers	24	20	.545
6	Detroit Gems	4	40	.091

=== NBL Schedule ===
Not to be confused with exhibition or other non-NBL scheduled games that did not count towards Anderson's official NBL record for this season. An official database created by John Grasso detailing every NBL match possible (outside of two matches that the Kankakee Gallagher Trojans won over the Dayton Metropolitans in 1938) would be released in 2026 showcasing every team's official schedules throughout their time spent in the NBL. As such, these are the official results recorded for the Anderson Duffey Packers during their first season in the NBL.

#	Date	Opponent	Score	Record
1	November 11	Detroit	64–52	1–0
2	November 14	Toledo	51–50	2–0
3	November 18	Youngstown	66–58	3–0
4	November 21	@ Sheboygan	54–72	3–1
5	November 23	@ Oshkosh	66–64	4–1
6	November 25	Fort Wayne	55–52	5–1
7	December 2	Indianapolis	52–53	5–2
8	December 6	@ Indianapolis	49–56	5–3
9	December 9	Syracuse	69–64	6–3
10	December 11	@ Buffalo	50–52 (OT)	6–4
11	December 16	Oshkosh	66–64	7–4
12	December 19	Buffalo	61–46	8–4
13	December 22	@ Chicago	57–54	9–4
14	December 23	Chicago	63–60	10–4
15	December 30	Rochester	62–67	10–5
16	January 2	Sheboygan	80–64	11–5
17	January 6	Toledo	71–81	11–6
18	January 7	@ Indianapolis	54–73	11–7
19	January 9	@ Syracuse	64–71	11–8
20	January 11	@ Rochester	69–75 (OT)	11–9
21	January 12	@ Fort Wayne	61–56	12–9
22	January 13	@ Youngstown	63–56	13–9
23	January 14	Sheboygan	63–60 (OT)	14–9
24	January 16	Chicago	56–58	14–10
25	January 20	@ Tri-Cities	58–56	15–10
26	January 21	@ Tri-Cities	67–45	16–10
27	January 23	@ Sheboygan	44–47	16–11
28	January 26	@ Chicago	50–55	16–12
29	January 30	Fort Wayne	58–55	17–12
30	February 3	Toledo	56–52	18–12
31	February 5	@ Detroit	44–38	19–12
32	February 6	@ Youngstown	59–78	19–13
33	February 10	Rochester	60–54	20–13
34	February 17	Syracuse	53–54 (OT)	20–14
35	February 20	Oshkosh	60–61	20–15
36	February 24	N Detroit	85–57	21–15
37	March 2	@ Fort Wayne	56–61	21–16
38	March 3	Youngstown	63–47	22–16
39	March 5	@ Toledo	55–52	23–16
—	March 6‡	@ Buffalo	Cancelled	
40	March 6‡	@ Syracuse	46–68	23–17
41	March 8	@ Rochester	59–64	23–18
42	March 10	Detroit	72–51	24–18
43	March 13	Indianapolis	61–68	24–19
44	March 15	@ Oshkosh	52–55	24–20

‡ – The March 6, 1947 game that Anderson was originally intended to have played was against the Buffalo Bisons in Buffalo, New York, but due to the team moving to Moline, Illinois to become the Tri-Cities Blackhawks for the rest of the season by December 25, 1946, that game would ultimately be cancelled, meaning that at least Anderson's road schedule (and by extension, both the Syracuse Nationals' home schedule and the Indianapolis Kautskys' road schedule) ultimately got affected for this season due to the team change for this season.

== Awards and honors ==
- National Basketball League (United States) All-Time Team – Jerry Bush and Charley Shipp

== World Professional Basketball Tournament ==
After previously participating in the 1946 World Professional Basketball Tournament as the Anderson Chiefs (making it as far as the quarterfinal round there before losing to the American Basketball League's newest champions that season in the Baltimore Bullets), the Anderson Duffey Packers would return to the World Professional Basketball Tournament once again under their new name for the 1947 edition, with it being held in Chicago once again and it taking place on April 7–11, 1947. Due to the evergrowing strength of the National Basketball League by this point in time, a vast majority of the teams competing there this time around would mostly come from the NBL some of the independently ran teams that still held some sort of presence in independent basketball by this time (such as the all-black New York Renaissance), as well as the defending American Basketball League champion Baltimore Bullets (who had a 34–3 season) and the Portland Indians from the ultimately short-lived Pacific Coast Professional Basketball League. For the first round of the tournament, the Duffey Packers would go up against a former NBL team in the Pittsburgh Pirates, though they could actually be considered the Pittsburgh Raiders instead. In any case, Anderson would go and make easy work of the former NBL franchise, blowing them out in incredibly easy fashion with an easy 59–38 victory as all but one NBL team entered the quarterfinal round this year.

For the quarterfinal round, the Duffey Packers would go up against the three-time defending WPBT champions, the Fort Wayne Zollner Pistons, who would still be looking for their fourth straight championship in the WPBT through the 1947 tournament. Unfortunately, much like the previous year's event, where Anderson faltered as the Chiefs in the quarterfinal round to the ABL's Baltimore Bullets, the Duffey Packers would end up faltering to the Zollner Pistons in a 52–40 defeat where Fort Wayne made easy work of their cityside rivals in Anderson by comparison to the close work that Baltimore had done to Anderson in the previous year's event. To add insult to the Duffey Packers' elimination in this event, the Fort Wayne Zollner Pistons would later be eliminated by the Toledo Jeeps in the semifinal round, who would end up losing the championship match to the Indianapolis Kautskys, a team that never won a single WPBT match before entering this year's tournament. (Fort Wayne would later end up finishing the tournament in third place instead.)

=== Scores ===
- Won first round (59–38) over the Pittsburgh Pirates
- Lost quarterfinal round (40–52) to the Fort Wayne Zollner Pistons
