= 1946–47 Fort Wayne Zollner Pistons season =

Sixth season of the Pistons in the NBL

- Head coach: Bobby McDermott (9–8); Carl Bennett (15–11); Curly Armstrong (1–0)
- Owner: Fred Zollner
- Arena: North Side High School Gym, Fort Wayne, Indiana

Results
- Record: 25–19 (.568)
- Place: Division: 2nd (Eastern)
- Playoff finish: Lost Division Semifinals to Rochester Royals, 2-1
- Stats at Basketball Reference

The 1946–47 Fort Wayne Zollner Pistons season was the sixth season of the franchise in the National Basketball League. For the first time in their NBL history, Fort Wayne had to play without five-time NBL MVP Bobby McDermott, who left the team in the middle of the season (specifically by the end of 1946) to be a player-coach for the Chicago American Gears (who ended up winning the NBL's championship this season). Not only that, but they also lost star guard Buddy Jeannette during the offseason to the Baltimore Bullets from the rivaling American Basketball League as well, though they did get back power forward Blackie Towery following World War II's conclusion. This also would be the NBL's first official season where they actually implemented a drafting system similar to what the future rivaling Basketball Association of America (and later merging partner to become the National Basketball Association) had for the eventual NBA draft system a year later following the conclusion of their inaugural league season for the purpose of controlled player salaries and limiting the idea of outbidding other players outside of their own 12-player teams at hand (with the NBL having a budget of $6,000 this season), as well as implementing key players to signing binding contracts as soon as they could and the NBL looking to have full-time referees on display. The Zollner Pistons finished the season by being second place in the Eastern Division behind the defending champion Rochester Royals and defeated the Toledo Jeeps 3–2 in the quarterfinal round of the Eastern Division's NBL Playoffs before falling to the Rochester Royals 2–1 in the semifinal round.

While they failed to win the NBL championship once again, the Fort Wayne Zollner Pistons would participate in the World Professional Basketball Tournament once again in the hopes of being a four-time champion team there. The Zollner Pistons were granted a first round bye once again due to their champion status in the WPBT alongside being the best team in their division that participated in that event (alongside the Indianapolis Kautskys getting a first round bye, oddly enough, despite them not only being a team that never won a match in the WPBT before this year's event, but also participating alongside the Oshkosh All-Stars, who had won the best record in their division that year) and had beaten the Anderson Duffey Packers 52–40 in the quarterfinal round before being upset by the Toledo Jeeps 61–56 in the semifinal round, denying Fort Wayne the chance to be a rare four-time champion (doing it four times in a row) while in the WPBT. Instead, The Fort Wayne Zollner Pistons would have to settle for a third-place finish by blowing out the Oshkosh All-Stars 86–67, while the Toledo Jeeps were upset by the Indianapolis Kautskys for not just their first and only victories in the WPBT, but also their only professional championship that they would win altogether.

== Draft picks ==
Entering this season, the National Basketball League would utilize their own draft system that would be considered similar to what the NFL has done for the NFL draft. As such, the 1946 NBL draft would be considered the first ever professional basketball draft ever done, even before the 1947 BAA draft that was done by the soon to be rivaling Basketball Association of America. Because of that fact, the Fort Wayne Zollner Pistons would participate in the inaugural 1946 NBL draft, which had occurred sometime during the 1946–47 season's offseason period before that season officially began for the NBL. However, as of 2026, no records of what the Zollner Pistons' draft picks might have been for the NBL have properly come up, with any information on who those selections might have been for Fort Wayne being lost to time in the process.

== Roster ==
1946–47 Fort Wayne Zollner Pistons roster
Players

Pos.	No.	Player	Height	Weight	DOB	From
G/F		Curly Armstrong	5 ft 11 in (1.80 m)	170 lb (77 kg)	1918-11-01	Indiana
F/C		Ken Buehler	6 ft 2 in (1.88 m)	180 lb (82 kg)	1919-11-19	UW–Milwaukee State Teachers College
F/C		Jerry Bush	6 ft 3 in (1.91 m)	200 lb (91 kg)	1914-09-06	St. John's
G		Whitey Dienelt	6 ft 0 in (1.83 m)	185 lb (84 kg)	1921-04-28	Indiana
F/C		Ben Gardner	6 ft 3 in (1.91 m)	190 lb (86 kg)	1919-10-18	Sam Houston State
G/F		Frank Gates	6 ft 0 in (1.83 m)	160 lb (73 kg)	1920-04-12	Sam Houston State
F/C		Bob Kinney	6 ft 6 in (1.98 m)	215 lb (98 kg)	1920-09-16	Rice
F/C		Milo Komenich	6 ft 7 in (2.01 m)	212 lb (96 kg)	1920-06-22	Wyoming
G		Bobby McDermott	5 ft 11 in (1.80 m)	180 lb (82 kg)	1914-01-07	Flushing HS (NY)
G		Lyle Neat	6 ft 0 in (1.83 m)	180 lb (82 kg)	1916-09-29	Butler
G/F		Richie Niemiera	6 ft 1 in (1.85 m)	165 lb (75 kg)	1921-05-26	Notre Dame
F/C		Jake Pelkington	6 ft 6 in (1.98 m)	220 lb (100 kg)	1916-01-03	Manhattan
G/F		Chick Reiser	5 ft 11 in (1.80 m)	165 lb (75 kg)	1914-12-17	NYU
G/F		Charley Shipp	6 ft 1 in (1.85 m)	200 lb (91 kg)	1913-12-03	Catholic
G		Jerry Steiner	5 ft 7 in (1.70 m)	160 lb (73 kg)	1918-01-07	Butler
G/F		Bob Tough	6 ft 0 in (1.83 m)	185 lb (84 kg)	1920-08-28	St. John's
F/C		Carlisle Towery	6 ft 4 in (1.93 m)	210 lb (95 kg)	1920-06-20	Western Kentucky

Coaches
Head coach

Bobby McDermott
Carl Bennett
Curly Armstrong

Legend
- (DP) Unsigned draft pick
- (FA) Free agent
- (S) Suspended
- Injured

Roster

Note: Ken Buehler, Jerry Bush, Ben Gardner, player-coach Bobby McDermott, Lyle Neat, and Charley Shipp were not a part of the playoff roster for this season for one reason or another.

== Regular season ==
=== NBL Schedule ===
Not to be confused with exhibition or other non-NBL scheduled games that did not count towards Fort Wayne's official NBL record for this season. An official database created by John Grasso detailing every NBL match possible (outside of two matches that the Kankakee Gallagher Trojans won over the Dayton Metropolitans in 1938) would be released in 2026 showcasing every team's official schedules throughout their time spent in the NBL. As such, these are the official results recorded for the Fort Wayne Zollner Pistons during their sixth season in the NBL.

#	Date	Opponent	Score	Record
1	November 17	Youngstown	61–53	1–0
2	November 19	@ Detroit	60–44	2–0
3	November 24	Indianapolis	57–55 (OT)	3–0
4	November 25	@ Anderson	52–55	3–1
5	December 1	Detroit	62–39	4–1
6	December 2	@ Toledo	64–60	5–1
7	December 8	Buffalo	62–41	6–1
8	December 10	@ Indianapolis	39–65	6–2
9	December 12	@ Sheboygan	56–65	6–3
10	December 13	@ Chicago	40–47	6–4
11	December 14	@ Oshkosh	50–71	6–5
12	December 15	Oshkosh	77–60	7–5
13	December 17	@ Rochester	51–55	7–6
14	December 19	@ Syracuse	47–61	7–7
15	December 22	Sheboygan	69–57	8–7
16	December 29	Rochester	65–67 (OT)	8–8
17	December 30	@ Youngstown	57–54	9–8
18	January 3	@ Tri-Cities	52–47	10–8
19	January 5	Toledo	67–68	10–9
20	January 8	Chicago	56–55	11–9
21	January 12	Toledo	56–61	11–10
22	January 19	Syracuse	58–49	12–10
—	January 20	@ Buffalo	Cancelled	
23	January 22	Oshkosh	50–57	12–11
24	January 24	@ Chicago	60–64 (OT)	12–12
25	January 26	Youngstown	68–40	13–12
26	January 29	Sheboygan	56–49	14–12
27	January 30	@ Anderson	58–55	15–12
28	February 2	Toledo	51–41	16–12
29	February 5	Indianapolis	56–48	17–12
—	February 6	@ Buffalo	Cancelled	
30	February 8	@ Rochester	72–67	18–12
31	February 9	Tri-Cities	56–45	19–12
32	February 12	Rochester	64–60	20–12
33	February 16	Syracuse	55–56 [57–56†]	20–13 [21–12†]
34	February 17	@ Youngstown	63–72	20–14 [21–13†]
35	February 20	N Detroit	59–36	21–14 [22–13†]
36	February 22	@ Toledo	54–60	21–15 [22–14†]
37	February 23	Detroit	75–50	22–15 [23–14†]
38	February 26	@ Oshkosh	55–57	22–16
39	February 27	@ Sheboygan	52–57	22–17
40	March 2	Anderson	61–56	23–17
41	March 8	@ Syracuse	68–62	24–17
42	March 9	Chicago	62–69	24–18
43	March 11	@ Indianapolis	56–67	24–19
44	March 15	@ Tri-Cities	55–50	25–19

† – Game was originally recorded as a close, buzzer-beating 57–56 victory for the Fort Wayne Zollner Pistons, but the game was protested by the Syracuse Nationals due to what they saw as a faulty time clock situation where Fort Wayne made the final shot of the game due to a technicality that Syracuse saw in that match where the Zollner Pistons technically made the shot after the final clock showcased that there was 0 seconds remaining in the game. Interestingly, unlike in the present-day era where buzzer-beating shots would count so long as the ball left the shooter's hands before the clock struck 0 seconds in the quarter/period or game (depending upon the context of when the shot was going off at the time), the NBL ruled the protest in favor of Syracuse a week later on February 23, 1947 (with a newspaper article on February 24, 1947, confirming the changed results at hand), meaning the official score for that game would end with the Syracuse Nationals winning with a close 56–55 final score over the Fort Wayne Zollner Pistons where a buzzer-beating shot by Fort Wayne that normally would have counted in the present-day era was ultimately rescinded by the NBL instead. That meant for at least three games that this team played in (maybe four games played, at most), the Fort Wayne Zollner Pistons would have their record be shown as that with a record where they won a game where the victory on February 16, 1947, was later rescinded for Syracuse claiming the victory instead.

=== Eastern Division ===
Pos.	Eastern Division	Wins	Losses	Win %
1	Rochester Royals	31	13	.705
2	Fort Wayne Zollner Pistons	25	19	.568
T–3	Syracuse Nationals	21	23	.477
T–3	Toledo Jeeps	21	23	.477
5	Buffalo Bisons / Tri-Cities Blackhawks‡	19	25	.432
6	Youngstown Bears	12	32	.273
^{‡} Buffalo relocated primarily into the state of Illinois during the season and assumed Buffalo's team history and record in the standings. Buffalo's record was 5–8, while the Tri-Cities' record was 14–17.

=== Western Division ===
Pos.	Western Division	Wins	Losses	Win %
1	Oshkosh All-Stars	28	16	.636
2	Indianapolis Kautskys	27	17	.614
T–3	Chicago American Gears	26	18	.591
T–3	Sheboygan Red Skins	26	18	.591
5	Anderson Duffey Packers	24	20	.545
6	Detroit Gems	4	40	.091

== NBL Playoffs ==
=== NBL Eastern Division Opening Round ===
(2E) Fort Wayne Zollner Pistons vs. (3/4E) Toledo Jeeps: Fort Wayne wins series 3–2

- Game 1: March 18, 1947 @ Fort Wayne: Fort Wayne 65, Toledo 38
- Game 2: March 20, 1947 @ Fort Wayne: Fort Wayne 54, Toledo 31
- Game 3: March 24, 1947 @ Toledo: Toledo 56, Fort Wayne 46
- Game 4: March 25, 1947 @ Toledo: Toledo 58, Fort Wayne 53
- Game 5: March 26, 1947 @ Fort Wayne: Fort Wayne 64, Toledo 46

=== NBL Eastern Division Semifinals ===
(2E) Fort Wayne Zollner Pistons vs. (1E) Rochester Royals: Rochester wins series 2–1

- Game 1: March 29, 1947 @ Rochester: Rochester 58, Fort Wayne 49
- Game 2: March 30, 1947 @ Fort Wayne: Fort Wayne 56, Rochester 49
- Game 3: April 1, 1947 @ Rochester: Rochester 76, Fort Wayne 47

=== Awards and honors ===
- First Team All-NBL – Bobby McDermott
- All-Time NBL Team – Jerry Bush, Bobby McDermott, and Charley Shipp

== World Professional Basketball Tournament ==
For the seventh year in a row (sixth in a row while representing the NBL), the Fort Wayne Zollner Pistons would participate in the annual World Professional Basketball Tournament in Chicago, which saw the 1947 event being held on April 7–11, 1947 and consisted of 14 teams, most of which was an even mixture of independently ran teams and teams from the National Basketball League alongside the rivaling American Basketball League's defending champion Baltimore Bullets and the Portland Indians from the ultimately short-lived Pacific Coast Professional Basketball League. For the fourth straight year in a row, the Zollner Pistons were granted a first round bye due to their champion status in the WPBT alongside them being the best team in the NBL's reformatted Eastern Division (though they were given the bye alongside the Indianapolis Kautskys, oddly enough, despite them not only being a team that never won a match in the WPBT before this year's event (including the years they participated under the temporary monikers of the Indianapolis Pure Oils and Indianapolis Oilers), but also participating alongside the Oshkosh All-Stars, who had won the best record in the Western Division that year). As such, regardless of reasonings, Fort Wayne's first opponents in the WPBT's quarterfinal round this year was the Anderson Duffey Packers, which they took care of with relative ease by a 52–40 final score to advance to the semifinal round.

In the semifinal round, the Zollner Pistons saw themselves entering an opening round playoff rematch against the Toledo Jeeps, with whom Fort Wayne had beaten 3–2 in a best-of-five-game series in the NBL Playoffs. However, in the winner-takes-all match that saw the winner entering the championship match of tournament, Toledo saw themselves get their revenge for losing to Fort Wayne in the quarterfinal round of NBL Playoffs and get the 61–56 upset victory in the Jeeps' favor, which not only saw Toledo get into the championship round, but also saw the Zollner Pistons end their run for a fourth straight WPBT championship and instead be forced to settle for a potential third-place finish against the losing team between the Indianapolis Kautskys and Oshkosh All-Stars, meaning this year's WPBT path would have them facing off against NBL teams only for a change of pace.

For the third place consolation prize match, Fort Wayne went up against the Oshkosh All-Stars, who were the best team of the NBL's Western Division this season, with three more wins than the Zollner Pistons themselves had that year. For the third place match, Fort Wayne ended up routing the All-Stars for the entire match, with Oshkosh only tying up the Zollner Pistons' play for the fourth quarter, which by that point saw Fort Wayne blowing out the All-Stars with a 86–67 victory to settle for third place, with Ralph Hamilton being named a member of the All-Tournament First Team and Jake Pelkington being a member of the All-Tournament Second Team. As for the final, championship match-up between two NBL teams that had ended up exceeding expectations this year for this tournament, it would be the Kautskys that would upset the Jeeps for the championship with a 62–47 finale, though it was Toledo's Jule Rivlin that was named the WPBT's MVP over anyone from Indianapolis' team.

=== Games ===
- Fort Wayne had a bye in the first round.
- Won quarterfinal round (52–40) over the Anderson Duffey Packers
- Lost semifinal round (56–61) to the Toledo Jeeps
- Won third place consolation prize game (86–67) over the Oshkosh All-Stars

=== Honors ===
- Ralph Hamilton, All-Tournament First Team
- Jake Pelkington, All-Tournament Second Team
