= Bob Cotton (basketball) =

American basketball player

Personal information
- Born: December 29, 1920
- Died: March 10, 1999 (aged 78)
- Listed height: 6 ft 6 in (1.98 m)
- Listed weight: 250 lb (113 kg)

Career information
- College: Texas Wesleyan (1939–1943)
- Playing career: 1943–1947
- Position: Power forward / center

Career history
- 1943–1944: Aberdeen Proving Ground
- 1944–1945: Baltimore Bullets
- 1946–1947: Los Angeles Red Devils
- 1946–1947: Bellingham Fircrests
- 1946–1947: Spokane Orphans
- 1946–1947: Chicago American Gears

Robert Weyman Cotton (December 29, 1920 – March 10, 1999) was an American professional basketball player. He played for the Chicago American Gears in the National Basketball League and averaged 1.3 points per game. Cotton also played in various minor leagues after his time in the military during World War II.
