= Jim Zeravich =

American basketball player

Personal information
- Born: February 17, 1920 Chicago, Illinois, U.S.
- Died: August 16, 1998 (aged 78) Glendale Heights, Illinois, U.S.
- Listed height: 6 ft 7 in (2.01 m)

Career information
- College: Washington & Jefferson
- Position: Center

Career history
- 194?–1946: Chicago American Gears
- 1946–1947: Syracuse Nationals
- 1948–1949: Mt. Morris Kable Kolts
- 1949: Oak Park Refiners
- 1949–1950: Welco Oilers

James Bernard Zeravich (February 17, 1920 – August 16, 1998) was an American professional basketball player. He played for the Syracuse Nationals in the National Basketball League during the 1946–47 season. He also played in the Amateur Athletic Union for numerous squads.
