= 1946–47 National Basketball League (United States) season =

1946–47 NBL season
- League: National Basketball League
- Sport: Basketball
- Duration: November 7, 1946 – March 15, 1947; March 18–April 1, 1947 (Playoffs); April 3–9, 1947 (Finals)
- Games: 44
- Teams: 12

Regular season
- Season champions: Rochester Royals
- Top seed: Rochester Royals
- Season MVP: Bob Davies (Rochester)
- Top scorer: Al Cervi (Rochester)

Playoffs
- Eastern champions: Rochester Royals
- Eastern runners-up: Fort Wayne Zollner Pistons
- Western champions: Chicago American Gears
- Western runners-up: Oshkosh All-Stars

Finals
- Venue: Edgerton Park Arena, Rochester, New York; International Amphitheatre, Chicago, Illinois
- Champions: Chicago American Gears
- Runners-up: Rochester Royals

NBL seasons
- ← 1945–46 1947–48 →

The 1946–47 NBL season was the twelfth overall season for the U.S.A.'s National Basketball League (NBL) and its tenth season under that name after previously going by the Midwest Basketball Conference (a semipro or amateur precursor to the NBL) in its first two seasons of existence. This season would see the NBL take some of its most serious measures possible to have itself become a serious professional basketball league yet, as noted by not just an offseason meeting informing both the current and future team owners of what would occur during this season and how they planned to have agreements with other professional basketball leagues of the time to not go after each other, but also by how they expanded their operations even further with twelve teams competing this season, which was both the most number of teams the NBL had since its first season under the NBL name and triple the number of teams that competed in the 1943–44 NBL season and most of the 1942–43 NBL season. The regular season began on November 7, 1946, and ran until March 15, 1947. The playoffs began on March 18, 1947, and concluded on April 9, 1947 (with the NBL Championship series occurring at the same time both the 1947 BAA playoffs and the 1947 World Professional Basketball Tournament were happening), with the Chicago American Gears winning their first and only championship by upsetting the defending champion Rochester Royals 3 games to 1 in the NBL Championship series before later defecting from the NBL to create their own short-lived rivaling professional basketball league to go up against the NBL for the following season.

== Events of season ==
This season also saw the NBL begin to operate itself as a proper, professional basketball league, as a key meeting they had in May 1946 had the league discussing key issues like major expansion, financing, a selective draft system for the NBL and set roster limits for each team, set schedules and exhibition matches, the possibility to have full-time officiating on board, and utilizing free agency for signing key players; many of these operating systems they utilized during this meeting would be key features for the future of professional basketball (primarily in the successor league known as the National Basketball Association) as we know it. Other professional or minor basketball leagues that were trying to get their footing back on track at the time (such as the American Basketball League, the New York State Professional Basketball League, and the New England Basketball League) had agreed to not infringe on each other's territories during this same meeting, though one new professional basketball league that was not a part of this meeting at the time was the Basketball Association of America, which would have greater long-term consequences for everyone involved. An entire book focusing on the NBL's existence would be released in 2009 by historian and author Murry R. Nelson called "The National Basketball League: A History, 1935–1949", with an entire chapter being dedicated to this season of play.

Entering this season, the NBL would see itself get to the highest number of teams it had since the inaugural NBL season under that league's name, with it seeing twelve teams competing in the league (with six teams being in both the Eastern Division and Western Division) due to the additions of the Anderson Duffey Packers, the Buffalo Bisons (later Tri-Cities Blackhawks, with this Bisons team not being related to the Buffalo Bisons team from the inaugural NBL season), the Detroit Gems, the Syracuse Nationals, and the Toledo Jeeps, with Syracuse effectively replacing the Cleveland Allmen Transfers this season in terms of team positioning only. As a result of the high number of teams participating in the NBL this season under a more structured organization, all twelve teams this season would play a league-high 44 games for this regular season, which was the highest number of scheduled games for an NBL season yet. Following the conclusion of the regular season, the NBL would add an extra round of playoffs in each division for the rest of its existence going forward, with this season utilizing what would be considered the modern-day playoff formatting with the best team in the division taking on the fourth-best team in the division and the second-best team taking on the third-best team in the division for the opening round in best of five matches before the two remaining teams from each division faced off against each other in what was considered to be the "Division Semifinals" for each division there in a best of three series before the two teams from each division competed against each other in a best of five series again for the NBL championship. For this season, the Chicago American Gears (who were ranked the #3 seed in the Western Division alongside the Sheboygan Red Skins despite having star center George Mikan on the team) upset the defending champion Rochester Royals 3–1 to win their first and only league championship, though the NBL's commissioner of the time, Ward Lambert, inexplicably considered the team that had the best regular season record for this season in the Rochester Royals to be the official NBL champions this season instead. That decision alongside a future decision regarding the NBL's president for the upcoming season would lead to the Chicago American Gears leaving the NBL to create their own rivaling professional basketball league in the Professional Basketball League of America.

Eastern Division	Buffalo Bisons/Tri-Cities Blackhawks Buffalo, New York/Moline, Illinois	Fort Wayne Zollner Pistons Fort Wayne, Indiana	Rochester Royals Rochester, New York
Eastern Division	Syracuse Nationals Syracuse, New York	Toledo Jeeps Toledo, Ohio	Youngstown Bears Youngstown, Ohio
Western Division	Anderson Duffey Packers Anderson, Indiana	Chicago American Gears Chicago, Illinois	Detroit Gems Detroit, Michigan
Western Division	Indianapolis Kautskys Indianapolis, Indiana	Oshkosh All-Stars Oshkosh, Wisconsin	Sheboygan Red Skins Sheboygan, Wisconsin

== Connections with Basketball Association of America ==
While the NBL would not view the recently created Basketball Association of America as a serious threat early on in its existence, by the end of the season, the NBL would view it as just as seriously of a rivaling competitive league as the American Basketball League has been throughout the NBL's existence at the time by the end of the season. Following what would later become three mixed years of truces and strenuous competition against each other, the NBL and Basketball Association of America (the latter league not existing until just this season) eventually merged operations by August 3, 1949, to create the present-day National Basketball Association. Despite the NBL continuing to exist up until the 1948–49 NBL season as the longer-lasting operation, the NBL would not recognize the twelve NBL seasons (nor the two MBC precursor seasons nor even the one National Professional Basketball League season (with scant few connections there) that helped inspire the league's creation) as a part of its own history (outside of certain circumstances), sometimes without comment. As such, none of the previous twelve NBL seasons nor even the two MBC seasons would officially be recognized by the NBA, with the NBA recognizing the 1946–47 BAA season as its first official season of play instead.

Of the twelve NBL teams that competed in the league this season, eight of these teams (four from each division) would end up playing in what can be considered the modern-day NBA, with five of these teams still existing in the NBA to this very day (albeit under different names). After this season's conclusion, the Detroit Gems (who finished with the league's worst record in its more recent era with a 4–40 record) would have a hard reboot with the team being bought out and moved to Minneapolis, Minnesota to become the Minneapolis Lakers for the next season of play. After that season concluded for them, the Lakers alongside the Fort Wayne Zollner Pistons, Indianapolis Kautskys, and Rochester Royals all moved from the NBL to the BAA for the 1948–49 BAA season (though with the Fort Wayne and Indianapolis teams needing name changes as the Fort Wayne Pistons and Indianapolis Jets respectively due to them utilizing business sponsorships for their team names), with both the Oshkosh All-Stars and Toledo Jeeps trying and failing to switch leagues alongside them. Outside of the eight teams that eventually joined the BAA/NBA and the two teams that later failed to join the BAA, the only two NBL teams that would not have any connections to the BAA/NBA at all from this season were the new NBL champion Chicago American Gears (due to them already defecting from the NBL to create their short-lived rivaling Professional Basketball League of America) and the Youngstown Bears, who folded operations entirely following this season's conclusion.

Coaching changes
Offseason
Team	1945–46 coach	1946–47 coach
Chicago American Gears	Swede Roos	Davey Banks
Fort Wayne Zollner Pistons	Carl Bennett	Bobby McDermott (player-coach)
Indianapolis Kautskys	Nat Hickey	Ernie Andres
Sheboygan Red Skins	Dutch Dehnert	Doxie Moore
Youngstown Bears	Paul Birch	Frank Shannon
In-season
Team	Outgoing coach	Incoming coach
Anderson Duffey Packers	Murray Mendenhall	Ike Duffey (interim)
Chicago American Gears	Davey Banks; Harry Foote (interim); Bruce Hale (interim player-coach)	Harry Foote (interim); Bruce Hale (interim player-coach); Bobby McDermott (player-coach)
Detroit Gems	Joel Mason	Fred Campbell
Fort Wayne Zollner Pistons	Bobby McDermott (player-coach); Carl Bennett	Carl Bennett; Curly Armstrong (interim player-coach)
Indianapolis Kautskys	Ernie Andres (player-coach)	Bob Dietz and Herm Schaefer (interim player-coaches)
Syracuse Nationals	Bennie Borgmann; George Mingin (interim)	George Mingin (interim); Jerry Rizzo (player-coach)

== Final standings ==
=== Eastern Division ===
Pos.	Eastern Division	Wins	Losses	Win %
1	Rochester Royals	31	13	.705
2	Fort Wayne Zollner Pistons	25	19	.568
T–3	Syracuse Nationals	21	23	.477
T–3	Toledo Jeeps	21	23	.477
5	Buffalo Bisons / Tri-Cities Blackhawks‡	19	25	.432
6	Youngstown Bears	12	32	.273
^{‡} Buffalo relocated primarily into the state of Illinois during the season and assumed Buffalo's team history and record in the standings. Buffalo's record was 5–8, while the Tri-Cities' record was 14–17.

=== Western Division ===
Pos.	Western Division	Wins	Losses	Win %
1	Oshkosh All-Stars	28	16	.636
2	Indianapolis Kautskys	27	17	.614
T–3	Chicago American Gears	26	18	.591
T–3	Sheboygan Red Skins	26	18	.591
5	Anderson Duffey Packers	24	20	.545
6	Detroit Gems	4	40	.091

== Playoffs ==
Due to the NBL expanding operations from eight to twelve teams this season, the NBL decided to expand their playoff formatting for what would later become its final few seasons of existence by adding a divisional opening round with the four best teams in each division competing against each other in a best of five series before the two remaining teams that would be considered the best of each division would compete in what's now called the "Division Semifinals" round in what's weirdly considered a best of three series this time around before the final two teams that would be considered the best from both divisions would compete against each other in a best of five championship series once again. In the opening round, the Eastern Division saw the Rochester Royals beat the newly created Syracuse Nationals 3–1 and the Fort Wayne Zollner Pistons works team barely survive against the new Toledo Jeeps team 3–2, while the Western Division saw the Oshkosh All-Stars permanently tie up their "Battle of Wisconsin" NBL Playoffs matches against their cityside rivals in the Sheboygan Red Skins 3–2 and the Chicago American Gears would barely survive against the Indianapolis Kautskys with a 3–2 series victory themselves in order to set up the divisional semifinal rounds. Entering those next rounds, the Rochester Royals would once against defeat the Fort Wayne Zollner Pistons, this time doing so in a closer 2–1 series victory, while the lower seeded Chicago American Gears would upset the Oshkosh All-Stars with a 2–0 sweep for a shot at the NBL Championship. For the championship series, the Chicago American Gears would upset the Rochester Royals 3–1 to win their first (and only) NBL championship in franchise history; following this season's end, the American Gears would leave the NBL to create an ambitious, yet ultimately short-lived rivaling professional basketball league called the Professional Basketball League of America due, in part, to commissioner Ward Lambert considering the regular season champions in the Rochester Royals to be the official champions of the NBL this season due to them having the best overall record in the league this season (though history would retroactively make the Chicago American Gears the official champions of the NBL for this season properly).

Division Opening Round
E1	Rochester Royals	3
E3/4	Syracuse Nationals	1
E2	Fort Wayne Zollner Pistons	3
E3/4	Toledo Jeeps	2
W1	Oshkosh All-Stars	3
W3/4	Sheboygan Red Skins	2
W2	Indianapolis Kautskys	2
W3/4	Chicago American Gears	3

Division Semifinals
E1	Rochester Royals	2
E2	Fort Wayne Zollner Pistons	1
W1	Oshkosh All-Stars	0
W3(/4)	Chicago American Gears	2

NBL Championship
E1	Rochester Royals	1
W3(/4)	Chicago American Gears	3

- Bold Series winner

== Statistical leaders ==
Category	Player	Team	Stat
Points	Al Cervi	Rochester Royals	632
Free-Throws	Chips Sobek	Toledo Jeeps	179
Field goals	Hal Tidrick	Toledo Jeeps	232

Note: Prior to the 1969–70 NBA season, league leaders in points were determined by totals rather than averages. Also, rebounding and assist numbers were not recorded properly in the NBL like they would be in the BAA/NBA, as would field goal and free-throw shooting percentages. This NBL season would prove to be the only season where that would make a significant difference to the scoring leader for the NBL this time around, as while Al Cervi did lead the NBL in overall points scored with 632 total points scored, the points per game averages would be led by George Mikan instead (despite him being 20th in total points scored for this season) with a 16.5 points per game average by Mikan beating out Cervi's total average of 14.4 points per game for this season.

== NBL awards ==
- NBL Most Valuable Player: Bob Davies, Rochester Royals
- NBL Coach of the Year: Lon Darling, Oshkosh All-Stars
- NBL Rookie of the Year: Fred Lewis, Sheboygan Red Skins
- All-NBL First Team:
  - G/F – Al Cervi, Rochester Royals
  - F/G – Fred Lewis, Sheboygan Red Skins
  - C – George Mikan, Chicago American Gears
  - G – Bob Davies, Rochester Royals
  - G – Bobby McDermott, Fort Wayne Zollner Pistons / Chicago American Gears
- All-NBL Second Team:
  - F/G – Bob Calihan, Chicago American Gears
  - F/C – Bob Carpenter, Oshkosh All-Stars
  - C – Arnie Risen, Indianapolis Kautskys
  - G/F – Hal Tidrick, Toledo Jeeps
  - G – Red Holzman, Rochester Royals
- NBL All-Rookie Team:
  - F/G – Fred Lewis, Sheboygan Red Skins
  - F/G – Leo Klier, Indianapolis Kautskys
  - C – Don Otten, Buffalo Bisons/Tri-Cities Blackhawks
  - G/F – Hal Tidrick, Toledo Jeeps
  - G – Jerry Rizzo, Syracuse Nationals

== World Professional Basketball Tournament ==
For the ninth World Professional Basketball Tournament ever hosted, it would feature a total of fourteen teams competing in the event held in Chicago on April 7–11, 1947, with most of the teams representing the NBL this year, with the rest of the competition involving independently ran teams alongside both the original Baltimore Bullets team from the original rivaling American Basketball League (who entered the event as defending ABL champions due to their overwhelming 31–3 regular season record) and the Portland Indians from what would soon prove to be the short-lived Pacific Coast Professional Basketball League. Of the eight NBL teams competing in this specific event, the Oshkosh All-Stars would defeat the Herkimer Mohawk Redskins 60–54, the Anderson Duffey Packers would crush the last vestiges of the original Pittsburgh Pirates team that once represented the NBL with a 59–38 blowout victory, the Syracuse Nationals would be crushed by the independently ran Midland Dow Chemicals works team representing the Dow Chemical Company that had intended to join the NBL this season in a 72–39 blowout defeat, the Sheboygan Red Skins would defeat the PCPBL's Portland Indians with a 62–48 victory, the Toledo Jeeps would upset the long-standing all-black New York Renaissance franchise with a close 62–59 victory, and the Tri-Cities Blackhawks would surprisingly upset the ABL's overly powerful-looking Baltimore Bullets with a 57–46 victory in the Tri-Cities' favor to end the first two days of the first round to go with the three-time defending WPBT champion Fort Wayne Zollner Pistons and the Indianapolis Kautskys' first round byes for nearly every single NBL team successfully making it to the quarterfinal round. As for the quarterfinal round, the Oshkosh All-Stars would defeat the Sheboygan Red Skins 53–44 in the WPBT's final Battle of Wisconsin for tournament competition, the Indianapolis Kautskys (who had previously never won a WPBT match before this year's event) would beat the Blackhawks 65–56 following the first round bye they had somehow gotten for this year's event, the three-time WPBT champion Fort Wayne Zollner Pistons would beat down the Duffey Packers with a 52–40 victory, and the Toledo Jeeps would end up upsetting the Midland Dow Chemicals with a close 59–55 victory in their favor, leaving the final four teams of the event to all be NBL teams this season. Entering the semifinal round, the Indianapolis Kautskys would end up surprisingly crushing the Oshkosh All-Stars with a 59–38 blowout victory, while the Toledo Jeeps would surprise the three-time defending WPBT champion Fort Wayne Zollner Pistons with a 61–56 victory to end Fort Wayne's WPBT championship run, leaving the championship match with two unexpected teams competing to win it all and two championship contending teams competing for third place instead. Finally, the Zollner Pistons would end up crushing the Oshkosh All-Stars with a 86–67 blowout win, while the Kautskys would end up stopping the Jeeps' Cinderella run with a 62–47 win to get their first and only championship in the event, though the MVP of the WPBT this time around would be given to the losing team instead due to Jule Rivlin being named the MVP of the entire event for his efforts in getting Toledo as far as they did.

== See also ==
- National Basketball League (United States)
- 1946–47 BAA season, the rivaling inaugural season of what would eventually be their merging partner to form the National Basketball Association in the younger Basketball Association of America
