= Lyle Neat =

American basketball player

Personal information
- Born: September 29, 1916 Lafayette, Indiana, U.S.
- Died: December 5, 1996 (aged 80) Speedway, Indiana, U.S.
- Listed height: 6 ft 0 in (1.83 m)
- Listed weight: 180 lb (82 kg)

Career information
- High school: Central (Fort Wayne, Indiana)
- College: Butler (1938–1941)
- Position: Guard

Career history
- 1946: Fort Wayne Zollner Pistons

Lyle Chester Neat (September 29, 1916 – December 5, 1996) was an American professional basketball player who played in one game in the National Basketball League (NBL) as a member of the Fort Wayne Zollner Pistons during the 1946–47 season. He was born in Indiana to William and Blanch Neat, who had eight other children. He died on December 5, 1996, in Marion, Indiana.
