= Bob Nugent =

American basketball player

Bob bob
Personal information
- Born: September 18, 1915 Syracuse, New York, U.S.
- Died: June 4, 1995 (aged 79) Rome, New York, U.S.
- Listed height: 5 ft 11 in (1.80 m)
- Listed weight: 170 lb (77 kg)

Career information
- High school: Christian Brothers Academy (DeWitt, New York)
- Playing career: 1939–1950
- Position: Guard

Career history
- 1939–1940: Syracuse
- 1939–1941: Syracuse Reds
- 1940–1941: Syracuse Shamrocks
- 1940–1942: Newark Elks
- 1945–1946: Syracuse All Stars
- 1946–1947: Syracuse Nationals
- 1947–1948: Utica Olympics
- 1948–1950: Oneida Indians

Robert Cornelius Nugent (September 18, 1915 – June 4, 1995) was an American professional basketball player. He played for the Syracuse Nationals in the National Basketball League during the 1946–47 season and averaged 3.5 points per game.
