= Jamie Dawson =

American basketball player and veterinarian

Personal information
- Born: July 9, 1922
- Died: May 30, 2009 (aged 86) Longview, Texas
- Listed height: 6 ft 7 in (2.01 m)
- Listed weight: 210 lb (95 kg)

Career information
- College: Texas A&M (1942–1946)
- Position: Center

Career history
- 1946–1947: Sheboygan Red Skins

Career highlights
- First-team All-SWC (1946)

Jamie Thompson Dawson (July 9, 1922 – May 30, 2009), commonly misidentified as "Jim" or "Jimmy" Dawson, was an American professional basketball player. He played in the National Basketball League for the Sheboygan Red Skins in 10 games during the 1946–47 season.

Dawson played collegiately at Texas A&M University between 1942 and 1946. As a senior in the 1945–46 season, he led the Aggies in scoring with 17.0 points per game and was named an all-Southwest Conference player. After his brief professional career, Dawson moved to Longview, Texas, in 1951 and established the Fredonia Animal Hospital where he served as a veterinarian until 1976.
