= Ed Costain =

American basketball player

Personal information
- Born: November 4, 1923 Wheeling, West Virginia, U.S.
- Died: September 30, 2009 (aged 85) Toledo, Ohio, U.S.
- Listed height: 6 ft 0 in (1.83 m)
- Listed weight: 170 lb (77 kg)
- Position: Guard

Career history
- 1946: Toledo Jeeps

Edric George Costain (November 4, 1923 – September 30, 2009) was an American professional basketball player. He played for the Toledo Jeeps in the National Basketball League in three games during the 1946–47 season and averaged 1.3 points per game.

He had spent time as a taxicab driver in Toledo, Ohio prior to working for The (Toledo) Blade as a photographer. Costain worked at The Blade for 34 years.
