= Les Rothman =

American basketball player (1926–2022)

Personal information
- Born: August 12, 1926 New York, U.S.
- Died: July 27, 2022 (aged 95)
- Listed height: 6 ft 1 in (1.85 m)
- Listed weight: 195 lb (88 kg)

Career information
- High school: Stuyvesant (New York City)
- College: LIU Brooklyn (1943–1946)
- Position: Shooting guard / small forward

Career history
- 1945–1946: Paterson Crescents
- 1946–1947: Elizabeth Braves
- 1946–1947: Paterson Crescents
- 1947: Chicago American Gears
- 1947: Syracuse Nationals

Lester Rothman (August 12, 1926 — July 27, 2022) was an American professional basketball player. He played for the Chicago American Gears (one game) and Syracuse Nationals (thirteen games) in the National Basketball League during the 1946–47 season and averaged 4.5 points per game. In the American Basketball League, he played for the Paterson Crescents and Elizabeth Braves.

Rothman also had a brief minor league baseball career. In 1945 he split time between the Norfolk Tars and Wellsville Yankees.

Rothman died on July 27, 2022, at the age of 95.
