= Los Angeles Red Devils =

- Founded: 1946
- Folded: 1947
- Arena: Grand Olympic Auditorium
- Location: Los Angeles, California
- Team colors: Red, white and blue
- Head coach: Jack Duddy

The Los Angeles Red Devils were an independent basketball team that played from 1946 to 1947. They were founded by sports promotor Jack Duddy and played out of the Grand Olympic Auditorium. Duddy also coached the team.

The Red Devils were one of the first integrated basketball teams. Their players included USC All-American Eddie Oram, two-sport Indiana athlete George Crowe, and Jackie Robinson (both Robinson and Crowe went on to also play Major League Baseball).

The Red Devils played exhibition games against National Basketball League teams, including winning one versus George Mikan’s Chicago American Gears. The Red Devils were considered as an expansion franchise for the National Basketball League, but that didn’t happen and the team folded.
