= 1946–47 Syracuse Nationals season =

NBL professional basketball team season

- Head coach: Bennie Borgmann (13–17); George Mingin (interim; 2–0); Jerry Rizzo (player-coach; 6–6)
- President: Danny Biasone
- General manager: George Mingin
- Owners: Danny Biasone (majority); George Mingin (minority)
- Arena: West Jefferson Street Armory

Results
- Record: 21–23 (.477)
- Place: Division: T-3rd (tied with Toledo Jeeps) (Eastern)
- Playoff finish: Lost NBL Eastern Division opening round to Rochester Royals, 3-1
- Stats at Basketball Reference

The 1946–47 Syracuse Nationals season was the first season of the franchise when they existed. They competed in the National Basketball League during their first three seasons of existence. The Nationals' first season of existence was also the NBL's first official season where they actually implemented a drafting system similar to what the future rivaling Basketball Association of America (and later merging partner to become the National Basketball Association) had for the eventual NBA draft system a year later following the conclusion of their inaugural league season for the purpose of controlled player salaries and limiting the idea of outbidding other players outside of their own 12-player teams at hand (with the NBL having a budget of $6,000 this season), as well as implementing key players to signing binding contracts as soon as they could and the NBL looking to have full-time referees on display. Team owner Danny Biasone originally created the franchise by accident since he only really wanted the Rochester Royals to play an exhibition match of sorts against a local team in Syracuse, New York that Biasone would sponsor for against the team in nearby Rochester, but the Royals' team owner, Les Harrison, had no interest in the idea, no matter the guarantee at the time, which led to Biasone complaining to the NBL's offices held in Chicago, Illinois before they offered him a spot in the NBL for a team out in Syracuse, much to his surprise and amazement. During this season, the team's inaugural head coach, Bennie Borgmann, would be let go from his position, with minority team owner George Mingin being the interim head coach for two games (both being wins) before Jerry Rizzo took over as the player-coach for the rest of the season, including the 1947 NBL Playoffs (after tying with the Toledo Jeeps for one of the last playoff spots this season), where they ended up losing in the Eastern Division opening round 3–1 to the Rochester Royals.

== Founding of franchise and season highlights ==
In May 1946, Danny Biasone and George Mingin deposited $1,000 with the National Basketball League (NBL) in hopes of securing a franchise for Syracuse. Biasone said a professional team would be formed with home games played at the West Jefferson Street Armory, even if the NBL declined to grant a franchise. In the absence of a league affiliation, the team would play as an independent.

Syracuse was one of five cities competing for a single new NBL franchise. The other cities that had applied were St. Louis, Milwaukee, Toledo and Anderson, Indiana. The NBL sent a representative to the city to assess the fiscal responsibility of the owners, their ability to assemble a quality team, the proposed playing facilities and the local appetite for professional basketball. The representative told a local reporter on June 24, that he planned to recommend Syracuse for NBL expansion. The Rochester Royals, defending league champions, were in favor of an NBL team in Syracuse to create a regional rivalry.

The NBL had planned to expand from eight teams to 12 for the 1946–47 season. Prior to the July 1, 1946 league meeting, the NBL had reactivated the Pittsburgh Raiders, which had suspended operations after the 1944–45 season, and granted expansion franchises to the Buffalo Bisons and Detroit Gems. It was, therefore, anticipated that only one new franchise would be granted at the meeting. The Anderson Duffey Packers were awarded the new franchise. However, both the Raiders and the Cleveland Allmen Transfers franchises were no longer considered viable franchises for the NBL and the league instead offered their spots in the league to the prospective owners from Syracuse and Toledo. Danny Biasone and George Mingin purchased the spot from the Cleveland franchise for a price in excess of $2,500, and the Toledo group purchased the spot from the Pittsburgh franchise to activate the Toledo Jeeps as a new franchise of their own. Biasone and Mingin did not acquire the rights to any of Cleveland's players in the transaction, effectively making all the 1945–46 Allmen Transfers players free agents. That being said, despite the fact that the original Syracuse Nationals franchise more or less bought out the Cleveland Allmen Transfers franchise to make it its own franchise, the Nationals would not claim the history of the Allmen Transfers (nor the complex history relating to them that also involves (potential) ties to the Cleveland Chase Brassmen (which they did share off of, albeit from their years in the Amateur Athletic Union as the Cleveland Chase Brass Coppers), the sole season of the Chicago Studebaker Flyers, and the much longer history of the Chicago Bruins) as well, with their history differing from the expansion Detroit Gems franchise to the future Minneapolis Lakers (now Los Angeles Lakers) franchise in terms of contexts there. Col. William A. Barry of the New York Guard, who managed the West Jefferson Street Armory, said that should the facility not be available for a Syracuse home game, the East Genesee Street Armory could serve as a backup.

Danny Biasone was the team's first president, with George Mingin being its first general manager. Long Island University's athletic director Lou Zara left his longtime post to become the team's business manager and public relations director. The team announced that it would play a 44-game league schedule, with 22 of those games being played at home. The owners expected the team to play about eight exhibition games at home and 60 games either on the road or on neutral floors, resulting in about 110 games to be played within a span of 5 1/2 months. It was planned that most home games would be played on Sunday evenings, with the remainder of their games being played on Tuesdays and Thursdays. Western NBL teams would be scheduled to visit Syracuse and Rochester on Sundays and Tuesdays, thus playing against both teams on the same trip.

On August 7, 1946, Syracuse announced former professional basketball player turned head coach Bennie Borgmann had been hired as the team's first head coach. At the time, Borgmann was the manager of the Rochester Red Wings minor league baseball team. He had a previous connection to the local area, having served as the manager of the Syracuse Chiefs minor league baseball team in 1941. Following the 1946 baseball season, Borgmann resigned his position as Red Wings manager, remaining with the St. Louis Cardinals organization as a scout.

By August 1946, newspapers were referring to the team as the Nationals or, alternatively, as the Nats.

The Nationals started preseason drills on October 21, with 30 players reporting.

After the NBL season schedule had been finalized, the New York Guard issued a ruling prohibiting the use of any armory in the state for competitive sports on Sundays. Ten of the Nationals' 22 home games had been scheduled for Sunday evenings. The Nationals' appeal for an exception to the ruling was denied. The Nationals contacted opponents slated to play at the Armory on Sundays to begin the process of rescheduling the games. In the aftermath, Syracuse mayor Frank Costello announced a committee would be formed for the purpose of finding a way to make the article available for a wide variety of sporting events in the city.

The Nationals and Toledo Jeeps met in the NBL's season opener at the University of Toledo's Field House on November 7, 1946. Leading by a point with 10 minutes to play, the Jeeps closed the game on a 14–1 run to earn a 57–43 victory. Bob Nugent scored 11 points to lead Syracuse that night.

The Nationals took the Armory floor for their home opener against the Youngstown Bears with an 0–2 record. After falling behind be seven points at halftime, Syracuse rallied in the second half for a 67–64 victory. Johnny Gee scored 17 points, 10 in the second half, to lead the Nationals.

== Draft picks ==
Entering this season, the National Basketball League would utilize their own draft system that would be considered similar to what the NFL has done for the NFL draft. As such, the 1946 NBL draft would be considered the first ever professional basketball draft ever done, even before the 1947 BAA draft that was done by the soon to be rivaling Basketball Association of America. Because of that fact, the Syracuse Nationals would participate in the inaugural 1946 NBL draft, which had occurred sometime during the 1946–47 season's offseason period before that season officially began for the NBL. However, as of 2026, no records of what the Nationals' draft picks might have been for the NBL have properly come up, with any information on who those selections might have been for Syracuse (especially since the Syracuse Nationals franchise would be considered an expansion franchise for the NBL this season) being lost to time in the process.

== Roster ==
1946–47 Syracuse Nationals roster
Players

| Pos. | No. | Player | Height | Weight | DOB | From |
|---|---|---|---|---|---|---|
| G/F | | Charlie Butler | 6 ft 2 in (1.88 m) | 165 lb (75 kg) | 1920-08-15 | Notre Dame |
| F/C | | John Chaney | 6 ft 3 in (1.91 m) | 185 lb (84 kg) | 1920-02-29 | LSU |
| F/C | | Jack Dugger | 6 ft 3 in (1.91 m) | 225 lb (102 kg) | 1923-01-13 | Ohio State |
| F/C | | Edward Erban | 6 ft 4 in (1.93 m) | 220 lb (100 kg) | 1921-07-06 | Marquette |
| G | | Kenneth Exel | 6 ft 1 in (1.85 m) | 178 lb (81 kg) | 1920-09-12 | Minnesota |
| F/C | | Johnny Gee | 6 ft 9 in (2.06 m) | 225 lb (102 kg) | 1915-12-07 | Michigan |
| G | | Mort Hill | 6 ft 1 in (1.85 m) | 175 lb (79 kg) | 1922-10-24 | UC Santa Barbara |
| C | | Sam Lieberman | 6 ft 8 in (2.03 m) | 240 lb (109 kg) | 1921-09-20 | Lawrence Tech |
| G/F | | Bill McCahan | 5 ft 11 in (1.80 m) | 200 lb (91 kg) | 1921-06-07 | Duke |
| G/F | | Chick Meehan | 6 ft 1 in (1.85 m) | 195 lb (88 kg) | 1917-01-09 | Syracuse |
| G | | John Moiseichik | 5 ft 11 in (1.80 m) | 180 lb (82 kg) | 1920-06-05 | SUNY Cortland |
| G | | George Nelmark | 6 ft 1 in (1.85 m) | 180 lb (82 kg) | 1917-05-09 | UC Santa Barbara |
| F/C | | Mike Novak | 6 ft 9 in (2.06 m) | 219 lb (99 kg) | 1915-04-23 | Loyola Chicago |
| G | | Bob Nugent | 5 ft 11 in (1.80 m) | 170 lb (77 kg) | 1915-09-18 | Christian Brothers Academy (NY) |
| F/C | | Lou Possner | 6 ft 3 in (1.91 m) | 180 lb (82 kg) | 1917-08-11 | DePaul |
| G | 50 | Jerry Rizzo | 5 ft 7 in (1.70 m) | 150 lb (68 kg) | 1919-04-21 | Fordham |
| G/F | | Les Rothman | 6 ft 1 in (1.85 m) | 195 lb (88 kg) | 1926-08-12 | LIU |
| G | | Bob Shaddock | 6 ft 1 in (1.85 m) | 160 lb (73 kg) | 1920-11-15 | Syracuse |
| G/F | | Steve Sharkey | 6 ft 0 in (1.83 m) | 190 lb (86 kg) | 1918-12-30 | Nott Terrace HS (NY) |
| F/C | | Robert Synnott | 6 ft 3 in (1.91 m) | 190 lb (86 kg) | 1912-09-27 | Theodore Roosevelt HS (NY) |
| C | | James Zeravich | 6 ft 7 in (2.01 m) | 190 lb (86 kg) | 1920-02-17 | Washington & Jefferson |

Coaches
Head coach

Bennie Borgmann
George Mingin (interim)
Jerry Rizzo (player-coach)

Legend
- (DP) Unsigned draft pick
- (FA) Free agent
- (S) Suspended
- Injured

Roster

Note: Over half of the roster would not be a part of the playoff roster this season, as the playoff team would only feature John Chaney, Ken Exel, Johnny Gee, George Nelmark, Mike Novak, Bob Nugent, Jerry Rizzo, and Steve Sharkey to become the official roster utilized for the playoffs this season.

== Season standings ==
=== Eastern Division standings ===
| Pos. | Eastern Division | Wins | Losses | Win % |
|---|---|---|---|---|
| 1 | Rochester Royals | 31 | 13 | .705 |
| 2 | Fort Wayne Zollner Pistons | 25 | 19 | .568 |
| T–3 | Syracuse Nationals | 21 | 23 | .477 |
| T–3 | Toledo Jeeps | 21 | 23 | .477 |
| 5 | Buffalo Bisons / Tri-Cities Blackhawks‡ | 19 | 25 | .432 |
| 6 | Youngstown Bears | 12 | 32 | .273 |
^{‡} Buffalo relocated primarily into the state of Illinois during the season and assumed Buffalo's team history and record in the standings. Buffalo's record was 5–8, while the Tri-Cities' record was 14–17.

=== NBL Schedule ===
Not to be confused with exhibition or other non-NBL scheduled games that did not count towards Syracuse's official NBL record for this season. An official database created by John Grasso detailing every NBL match possible (outside of two matches that the Kankakee Gallagher Trojans won over the Dayton Metropolitans in 1938) would be released in 2026 showcasing every team's official schedules throughout their time spent in the NBL. As such, these are the official results recorded for the Syracuse Nationals during their first ever season in the NBL.

| # | Date | Opponent | Score | Record |
| 1 | November 7 | @ Toledo | 43–57 | 0–1 |
| 2 | November 10 | @ Buffalo | 39–50 | 0–2 |
| 3 | November 14 | Youngstown | 67–64 | 1–2 |
| 4 | November 16 | @ Rochester | 35–41 | 1–3 |
| 5 | November 21 | Buffalo | 43–45 | 1–4 |
| 6 | November 26 | Detroit | 54–61 | 1–5 |
| 7 | November 28 | Toledo | 54–67 | 1–6 |
| 8 | November 30 | Indianapolis | 59–62 | 1–7 |
| 9 | December 2 | @ Youngstown | 47–36 | 2–7 |
| 10 | December 3 | Chicago | 59–69 | 2–8 |
| 11 | December 5 | @ Sheboygan | 47–74 | 2–9 |
| 12 | December 6 | N Chicago | 57–55 | 3–9 |
| 13 | December 7 | @ Oshkosh | 43–74 | 3–10 |
| 14 | December 9 | @ Anderson | 64–69 | 3–11 |
| 15 | December 12 | Detroit | 60–40 | 4–11 |
| 16 | December 19 | Fort Wayne | 61–47 | 5–11 |
| 17 | December 26 | @ Youngstown | 53–58 | 5–12 |
| 18 | December 30‡ | Indianapolis | 56–49 | 6–12 |
| — | January 8 | @ Buffalo | Cancelled | |
| 19 | January 9 | Anderson | 71–64 | 7–12 |
| 20 | January 16 | Oshkosh | 67–49 | 8–12 |
| 21 | January 19 | @ Fort Wayne | 49–58 | 8–13 |
| 22 | January 21 | @ Indianapolis | 52–57 | 8–14 |
| 23 | January 23 | Rochester | 53–60 | 8–15 |
| 24 | January 28 | @ Tri-Cities | 46–41 | 9–15 |
| 25 | January 31 | @ Chicago | 60–62 | 9–16 |
| 26 | February 1 | @ Oshkosh | 50–46 | 10–16 |
| 27 | February 4 | Detroit | 84–55 | 11–16 |
| 28 | February 6 | Oshkosh | 54–53 | 12–16 |
| 29 | February 8 | Toledo | 58–51 | 13–16 |
| 30 | February 13 | Chicago | 50–61 | 13–17 |
| 31 | February 16 | @ Fort Wayne | 56–55 [56–57†] | 14–17 [13–18†] |
| 32 | February 17 | @ Anderson | 54–53 (OT) | 15–17 [14–18†] |
| 33 | February 18 | @ Indianapolis | 46–59 | 15–18 [14–19†] |
| 34 | February 20 | Youngstown | 80–44 | 16–18 [15–19†] |
| 35 | February 24 | Tri-Cities | 53–47 | 17–18 |
| 36 | February 27 | @ Toledo | 48–69 | 17–19 |
| 37 | March 1 | @ Rochester | 54–63 | 17–20 |
| 38 | March 2 | @ Sheboygan | 61–63 | 17–21 |
| 39 | March 6‡ | Anderson | 68–46 | 18–21 |
| 40 | March 8 | @ Fort Wayne | 62–68 | 18–22 |
| 41 | March 10 | Rochester | 54–60 | 18–23 |
| 42 | March 11 | @ Detroit | 68–50 | 19–23 |
| 43 | March 12 | @ Sheboygan | 63–40 | 20–23 |
| 44 | March 13 | Sheboygan | 55–48 | 21–23 |

† – Game was originally recorded as a close, buzzer-beating 57–56 victory for the Fort Wayne Zollner Pistons, but the game was protested by the Syracuse Nationals due to what they saw as a faulty time clock situation where Fort Wayne made the final shot of the game due to a technicality that Syracuse saw in that match where the Zollner Pistons technically made the shot after the final clock showcased that there was 0 seconds remaining in the game. Interestingly, unlike in the present-day era where buzzer-beating shots would count so long as the ball left the shooter's hands before the clock struck 0 seconds in the quarter/period or game (depending upon the context of when the shot was going off at the time), the NBL ruled the protest in favor of Syracuse a week later on February 23, 1947 (with a newspaper article on February 24, 1947 confirming the changed results at hand), meaning the official score for that game would end with the Syracuse Nationals winning with a close 56–55 final score over the Fort Wayne Zollner Pistons where a buzzer-beating shot by Fort Wayne that normally would have counted in the present-day era was ultimately rescinded by the NBL instead. That meant for at least three games that this team played in, the Syracuse Nationals would have their record be shown as that with a record they lost a game where their defeat on February 16, 1947 was later rescinded for them claiming it as a victory instead.
‡ – Both the December 30, 1946 and March 6, 1947 matches the Syracuse Nationals had against both the Indianapolis Kautskys and Anderson Duffey Packers respectively were original road scheduled matches that both of those road teams in question had scheduled against the Buffalo Bisons before they moved to Moline, Illinois to become the Tri-Cities Blackhawks for the rest of the season. As such, this meant that not only were the Syracuse Nationals' home games modified this season for game dates, but also the road games scheduled for both Anderson and Indianapolis as well due to the mid-season team change for this season.

== NBL Playoffs ==
=== NBL Eastern Division Opening Round ===
(3/4E) Syracuse Nationals vs. (1E) Rochester Royals: Rochester wins series 3–1

- Game 1: March 18, 1947 @ Rochester: Rochester 66, Syracuse 64^{(OT)}
- Game 2: March 19, 1947 @ Syracuse: Syracuse 64, Rochester 61
- Game 3: March 21, 1947 @ Rochester: Rochester 54, Syracuse 48
- Game 4: March 22, 1947 @ Syracuse: Rochester 62, Syracuse 57

=== Awards and honors ===
- NBL All-Rookie Team – Jerry Rizzo
- All-Time NBL Team – Mike Novak

== World Professional Basketball Tournament ==
For the first and only time in franchise history, the Syracuse Nationals would participate in the World Professional Basketball Tournament in Chicago, which saw the 1947 event being held on April 7–11, 1947 and consisted of 14 teams, most of which was a mixture of teams from the National Basketball League and independently ran teams alongside the rivaling American Basketball League's defending champion Baltimore Bullets and the Portland Indians from the ultimately short-lived Pacific Coast Professional Basketball League. In the first round, the Nationals went up against the independently ran Midland Dow Chemicals works team, which involved players that were working at the Dow Chemical Company in Midland, Michigan (being primarily led by future NBL/NBA player Paul Cloyd, who was named a member of the All-Tournament Second Team this year). While the Nationals appeared to be the better team on the surface (what with them being a playoff squad despite their losing record), the Midland team proved to be the better poised and more prepared team by comparison, as the Dow Chemicals ended up crushing the Nationals 71–39 in what would become Syracuse's only game played in that event. As for Midland, they would end up losing their quarterfinal round game to the Toledo Jeeps, who ended up making it to the WPBT championship match by upsetting the three-time defending WPBT champion Fort Wayne Zollner Pistons in the semifinal round before losing it all to the Indianapolis Kautskys, who had previously never won a single WPBT match before this year's event, though Jule Rivlin of the Jeeps would be named the MVP of the tournament despite not winning the championship in the process of it all.

=== Game Played ===
- Lost first round (39–71) to the Midland Dow Chemicals
