= Don Smith (basketball, born 1920) =

American basketball player

Personal information
- Born: July 27, 1920 Minnesota, U.S.
- Died: March 1, 1996 (aged 75)
- Listed height: 6 ft 2 in (1.88 m)
- Listed weight: 190 lb (86 kg)

Career information
- High school: Roosevelt (Minneapolis, Minnesota)
- College: Minnesota (1939–1942)
- BAA draft: 1947: 8th round, 68th overall pick
- Drafted by: Chicago Stags
- Playing career: 1942–1948
- Position: Guard / forward
- Number: 12

Career history
- 1942–1943, 1944–1947: Oshkosh All-Stars
- 1947: Indianapolis Kautskys
- 1948: Minneapolis Lakers

Career highlights
- NBL champion (1948)

Career BAA statistics
- Points: 6 (0.8 ppg)
- Assists: 2 (0.3 apg)
- Stats at NBA.com
- Stats at Basketball Reference

Donald Everett Smith (July 27, 1920 – March 1, 1996) was an American professional basketball player. Smith was selected in the 1947 BAA Draft by the Chicago Stags after a collegiate career at Minnesota. He played for the Minneapolis Lakers in just the 1948–49 BAA season. He appeared in eight total games while recording six points and two assists.

== BAA career statistics ==
Legend
| GP | Games played | FG% | Field-goal percentage |
| FT% | Free-throw percentage | APG | Assists per game |
| PPG | Points per game |

=== Regular season ===
| Year | Team | GP | FG% | FT% | APG | PPG |
|---|---|---|---|---|---|---|
| 1948–49 | Minneapolis | 8 | .154 | .667 | .3 | .8 |
| Career | | 8 | .154 | .667 | .3 | .8 |
