= Bill McDonald (basketball) =

American basketball player (1916–1994)

Personal information
- Born: November 5, 1916 Spring Valley, Illinois, U.S.
- Died: February 7, 1994 (aged 77) Oshkosh, Wisconsin, U.S.
- Listed height: 6 ft 3 in (1.91 m)
- Listed weight: 190 lb (86 kg)

Career information
- High school: Spring Valley (Spring Valley, Illinois); St. Bede Academy (Peru, Illinois)
- College: Marquette (1938–1940)
- Playing career: 1940–1952
- Position: Guard / forward

Career history
- 1940–1944: Sheboygan Red Skins
- 1944–1945, 1946: Chicago American Gears
- 1946–1948: Oshkosh All-Stars
- 1951–1952: Sheboygan Red Skins

Career highlights
- NBL champion (1943)

William Lawrence McDonald (November 5, 1916 – February 7, 1994) was an American professional basketball player. He played for the Sheboygan Red Skins, Chicago American Gears, and Oshkosh All-Stars in the National Basketball League and averaged 4.1 points per game. In 1942–43 he won the NBL championship while playing for the Red Skins.
