= 1946–47 Toledo Jeeps season =

NBL professional basketball team season

- Head coach: Jule Rivlin (player-coach)
- General manager: Virgil Gladieux
- Owner(s): Virgil Gladieux; Willys-Overland Jeep Plant
- Arena: The Field House (University of Toledo)

Results
- Record: 21–23 (.477)
- Place: Division: T-3rd (tied with Syracuse Nationals) (Eastern)
- Playoff finish: Lost Eastern Division opening round to Fort Wayne Zollner Pistons, 3–2; Lost WPBT Championship match 62–47 to Indianapolis Kautskys

The 1946–47 Toledo Jeeps season was technically the first professional basketball season of play for the Toledo Jeeps in the city of Toledo, Ohio under the National Basketball League, which officially was the tenth season that it existed as a professional basketball league after previously existing as a semi-pro or amateur basketball league called the Midwest Basketball Conference in its first two seasons back in 1935. However, according to historian and author Murry R. Nelson in his book The National Basketball League: A History, 1935–1949, the Toledo Jeeps are actually a continuation of the original Toledo White Huts/Toledo Jim White Chevrolets franchise that, similar to the Jeeps franchise, started out playing in the World Professional Basketball Tournament in a previous year before officially joining the NBL, with the only difference in ownership being the partnership in question as the team owners this time around were at Willys-Overland Jeep Plant, which was owned and operated by Virgil Gladieux of Willys at the time (now known as the Toledo Complex) and sold Jeep cars instead of being owned and operated by a car salesman named Jim White for Chevrolet cars. As such, if we count the history of the White Huts/Jim White Chevrolets alongside the Jeeps franchise here, including the two previous independent seasons of play where they participated in the aforementioned WPBT events before being promoted to the NBL while using a different team name at the time, this season would officially be their fifth season of play when including the four games they played in the final season using the Jim White Chevrolets team name before folding the first time around before returning to operate once again instead of their second season as a franchise properly. The newly revived Toledo White Huts (who were sometimes referred to as the Toledo Whites during the 1946 World Professional Basketball Tournament) under the new primary ownership led by Virgil Gladieux of Willys-Overland Jeep Plant became one of five new NBL teams for the 1946–47 NBL season (alongside the removal of the Cleveland Allmen Transfers), with the Toledo franchise rebranding themselves to the Toledo Jeeps this time around and taking over the position that the NBL had initially intended to use to bring back the Pittsburgh Raiders into their league once again by paying the necessary money for their spot at hand in the league. their position in the NBL would ultimately be bought out by the team that later became the Toledo Jeeps instead. The Jeeps would be one of twelve teams competing in the NBL this season, which was composed of six teams in the Eastern Division (the Toledo Jeeps' division) and six teams in the Western Division.

The Jeeps would be the host team to start out the 1946–47 NBL season, with them defeating the Syracuse Nationals 57–43 on November 7, 1946. Initially, they started out the season with a very promising 6–1 record, with them only losing by one point against the Anderson Duffey Packers on November 14 and looking like they'd be one of the elite teams of the NBL throughout this season. However, once November turned into December for Toledo, the Jeeps would hit a serious losing streak that would keep them around an average pace and then at a losing pace, with their paces as a team varying throughout the rest of the season soon afterward. Despite the eventual downgrade in performance the further they went into the season, the Jeeps would still end up with a third place finish in the Eastern Division (which would be tied with the Syracuse Nationals despite the losing record), which would be good enough for them to face off against the Fort Wayne Zollner Pistons in the new opening round section of the NBL Playoffs. During this opening round, the Jeeps would end up stunning Fort Wayne in the games they played in their home venue held in Toledo, but their efforts to pull off an early first round upset would not be enough on their end, as Fort Wayne's home court advantage proved to be too much for Toledo to overcome, leaving them eliminated in a 3–2 series defeat. Despite the mixed results, the Jeeps would still see rookie Hal Tidrick make it to both the NBL's All-Rookie Team and All-NBL Second Team this season for the results he provided for the team.

In addition to the NBL, the Jeeps also participated in the 1947 World Professional Basketball Tournament, which was still seen as the biggest tournament for professional basketball at the time, despite it being in direct competition with both the 1947 NBL Championship (which saw the Chicago American Gears going up against the Rochester Royals) and the 1947 BAA Finals (which saw the upstart rivaling BAA showcasing the Philadelphia Warriors competing against the Chicago Stags) due to it being held in Chicago during those two competing championship events. They first showed up with a surprise performance against the all-black New York Renaissance, who had won the inaugural championship for the WPBT in 1939, upsetting them with a close 62–59 victory in their favor in the opening round. Then in the quarterfinal round, the Jeeps would take care of business against the only remaining independent team left in the competition by that point, the Midland Dow Chemicals (who had previously destroyed the Syracuse Nationals in the opening round) with a close 59–55 victory in their favor. After taking care of the independent teams, Toledo would look to see revenge upon the Fort Wayne Zollner Pistons in the semifinal round in a single, winner-takes-all match-up, which the Jeeps ended up getting with a relatively close 61–56 victory over the Zollner Pistons, which coincidentally also ended their three-year streak of being repeating WPBT champions in the process. While Toledo tried to complete the Cinderella run of the season on their end, they were unfortunately stopped by another NBL team who just so happened to have their own Cinderella run in the WPBT this time around, the Indianapolis Kautskys (a team who had never won in that tournament before the 1947 event occurred); despite the best efforts of player-coach Jule Rivlin (who had been named the WPBT MVP this year despite losing the championship match) and the rest of the Jeeps, they would ultimately be outmatched by the Kautskys as they put on a 62–47 beatdown to end their WPBT Cinderella run.

== Draft picks ==
Entering this season, the National Basketball League would utilize their own draft system that would be considered similar to what the NFL has done for the NFL draft. As such, the 1946 NBL draft would be considered the first ever professional basketball draft ever done, even before the 1947 BAA draft that was done by the soon to be rivaling Basketball Association of America. Because of that fact, the Toledo Jeeps would participate in the inaugural 1946 NBL draft, which had occurred sometime during the 1946–47 season's offseason period before that season officially began for the NBL. However, as of 2026, no records of what the Jeeps' draft picks might have been for the NBL have properly come up, with any information on who those selections might have been for Toledo (especially since the Toledo Jeeps franchise would be considered an expansion franchise for the NBL this season) being lost to time in the process.

== Roster ==
Please note that due to the way records for professional basketball leagues like the NBL and the ABL were recorded at the time, some information on both teams and players may be harder to list out than usual here.

1946–47 Toledo Jeeps roster
Players

Pos.	No.	Player	Height	Weight	DOB	From
F/C		Johnny Bianco	6 ft 4 in (1.93 m)	195 lb (88 kg)	1920–02–20	St. John's
G		Ed Costain	6 ft 0 in (1.83 m)	170 lb (77 kg)	1923–11–04	Central Catholic HS (OH)
G		Beryl Drummond	6 ft 1 in (1.85 m)	185 lb (84 kg)	1918–06–16	Waterloo HS (OH)
F/C		Bob Gerber	6 ft 4 in (1.93 m)	190 lb (86 kg)	1916–08–01	Toledo
F/C		Jim Gibbs	6 ft 5 in (1.96 m)	195 lb (88 kg)	1913–08–19	Warrensburg
G		Frankie Gilhooley	5 ft 11 in (1.80 m)	180 lb (82 kg)	1924–06–15	Notre Dame
G/F		Dale Hamilton	6 ft 0 in (1.83 m)	180 lb (82 kg)	1919–08–16	Franklin (IN)
F/C		Bernie Mehen	6 ft 4 in (1.93 m)	185 lb (84 kg)	1918–09–19	Tennessee
F		Joe Patanelli	6 ft 3 in (1.91 m)	205 lb (93 kg)	1919–09–18	Elkhart HS (IN)
G/F		Jule Rivlin	5 ft 11 in (1.80 m)	160 lb (73 kg)	1917–02–17	Marshall
G/F		Bennie Schall	5 ft 9 in (1.75 m)	165 lb (75 kg)	1917–12–08	Toledo
F/C		John Schick	6 ft 6 in (1.98 m)	230 lb (104 kg)	1916–01–06	Ohio State
G		Paul Seymour	6 ft 1 in (1.85 m)	180 lb (82 kg)	1928–01–30	Toledo
F/C		Bob Shaw	6 ft 4 in (1.93 m)	225 lb (102 kg)	1921–05–22	Ohio State
G		Chips Sobek	6 ft 0 in (1.83 m)	180 lb (82 kg)	1920–02–10	Notre Dame
G/F		Hal Tidrick	6 ft 1 in (1.85 m)	190 lb (86 kg)	1915–08–04	Washington & Jefferson

Coaches
Head coach
- Jule Rivlin

Legend
- (DP) Unsigned draft pick
- (FA) Free agent
- (S) Suspended
- Injured

Roster

== Regular season ==
=== Season standings ===
Pos.	Eastern Division	Wins	Losses	Win %
1	Rochester Royals	31	13	.705
2	Fort Wayne Zollner Pistons	25	19	.568
T–3	Syracuse Nationals	21	23	.477
T–3	Toledo Jeeps	21	23	.477
5	Buffalo Bisons / Tri-Cities Blackhawks‡	19	25	.432
6	Youngstown Bears	12	32	.273
^{‡} Buffalo relocated primarily into the state of Illinois during the season and assumed Buffalo's team history and record in the standings. Buffalo's record was 5–8, while the Tri-Cities' record was 14–17.

=== NBL Schedule ===
Not to be confused with exhibition or other non-NBL scheduled games that did not count towards Toledo's official NBL record for this season. An official database created by John Grasso detailing every NBL match possible (outside of two matches that the Kankakee Gallagher Trojans won over the Dayton Metropolitans in 1938) would be released in 2026 showcasing every team's official schedules throughout their time spent in the NBL. As such, these are the official results recorded for the Toledo Jeeps during their first season (or third overall season if the Toledo Jim White Chevrolets also gets counted as a part of the Toledo Jeeps' history) in the NBL.

#	Date	Opponent	Score	Record
1	November 7	Syracuse	57–43	1–0
2	November 12	@ Detroit	46–40	2–0
3	November 14	Anderson	50–51	2–1
4	November 16	@ Buffalo	50–39	3–1
5	November 25	Sheboygan	60–45	4–1
6	November 27	@ Youngstown	69–53	5–1
7	November 28	@ Syracuse	67–54	6–1
8	December 2	Fort Wayne	60–64	6–2
9	December 7	@ Rochester	44–60	6–3
10	December 8	Rochester	63–67	6–4
11	December 9	N Indianapolis	58–62	6–5
12	December 10	N Oshkosh	48–71	6–6
13	December 14	Indianapolis	64–56	7–6
14	December 17	Chicago	57–58	7–7
15	December 23	Buffalo	39–43	7–8
16	December 26	@ Sheboygan	57–60	7–9
17	December 27	@ Chicago	62–59	8–9
18	December 28	@ Oshkosh	59–61	8–10
19	January 5	@ Fort Wayne	68–67	9–10
20	January 6	@ Anderson	81–71	10–10
21	January 8	Youngstown	73–62	11–10
22	January 13	Detroit	69–51	12–10
23	January 20	Sheboygan	47–56	12–11
24	January 23	@ Youngstown	45–51	12–12
25	January 25	@ Rochester	88–86 (OT)	13–12
26	January 27	@ Tri-Cities	63–61	14–12
27	January 29	N Detroit	50–36	15–12
28	January 30	Detroit	73–51	16–12
29	February 2	@ Fort Wayne	41–51	16–13
30	February 3	@ Anderson	52–56	16–14
31	February 4	@ Indianapolis	42–44	16–15
32	February 5	Rochester	50–69	16–16
33	February 8	@ Syracuse	51–58	16–17
34	February 12	Chicago	57–55	17–17
35	February 13	@ Sheboygan	50–56	17–18
36	February 14	@ Chicago	50–72	17–19
37	February 15	@ Oshkosh	50–59	17–20
38	February 19	Youngstown	67–54	18–20
39	February 20	@ Buffalo/Tri-Cities*	52–64	18–21
40	February 22	Fort Wayne	60–54	19–21
41	February 27	Syracuse	69–48	20–21
42	March 5	Anderson	52–55	20–22
43	March 10	Indianapolis	45–58	20–23
44	March 13	Oshkosh	85–65	21–23

* – The February 20, 1947 road game the Toledo Jeeps had originally scheduled against the second version of the Buffalo Bisons in the NBL before they moved to Moline, Illinois and rebranded themselves as the Tri-Cities Blackhawks was one of two games that had originally been scheduled for the Buffalo Bisons that were still kept intact as a home match for the Tri-Cities Blackhawks on the same scheduled night of play (with the other match in question that kept the same home match in question being on February 17, 1947 against the Rochester Royals, which coincidentally also became a game the Tri-Cities Blackhawks won).

== NBL Playoffs ==
=== NBL Eastern Division Opening Round ===
(3/4E) Toledo Jeeps vs. (2E) Fort Wayne Zollner Pistons: Fort Wayne wins series 3–2

- Game 1: March 18, 1947 @ Fort Wayne: Fort Wayne 65, Toledo 38
- Game 2: March 20, 1947 @ Fort Wayne: Fort Wayne 54, Toledo 31
- Game 3: March 24, 1947 @ Toledo: Toledo 56, Fort Wayne 46
- Game 4: March 25, 1947 @ Toledo: Toledo 58, Fort Wayne 53
- Game 5: March 26, 1947 @ Fort Wayne: Fort Wayne 64, Toledo 46

== Awards and honors ==
- Hal Tidrick – All-NBL Second Team, NBL All-Rookie Team

== World Professional Basketball Tournament ==
After previously entering the 1946 World Professional Basketball Tournament as either the returning Toledo White Huts or as the shortened Toledo Whites that they had been listed under sometimes, the Toledo Jeeps would return to the World Professional Basketball Tournament to participate in the 1947 event under the same Toledo Jeeps name that they used for what can be considered their returning season in the NBL (assuming the Jeeps had the same team history as the previous Toledo Jim White Chevrolets NBL franchise, of course). This WPBT event, which would still be held in Chicago, ran from April 7–11, 1947 and consisted of 14 teams, most of which was an even mixture of independently ran teams and teams from the National Basketball League alongside the rivaling American Basketball League's defending champion Baltimore Bullets and the Portland Indians from the ultimately short-lived Pacific Coast Professional Basketball League. In the first round of the event, the Jeeps would go up against the all-black New York Renaissance, who by this point in time became a consistent representative for the WPBT (outside of the 1943 World Professional Basketball Tournament when it can be argued that the eventual champion Washington Bears (who were also an all-black team) took on the representation for them that year) alongside the NBL's own Oshkosh All-Stars. Unlike the previous year's event, where the Renaissance put an absolute beatdown on the Toledo squad they went up against in the first round, this year would see the Jeeps pull off a 62–59 upset victory over the New York squad due to the leadership of player-coach Jule Rivlin alongside the performances of Hal Tidrick and George Sobek despite the Renaissance having four different players scoring 10 or more points that night (Sonny Wood with 16, future NBA player Hank DeZonie with 12, and both future Basketball Hall of Famer Nat Clifton and George Crowe with 10 each).

For the quarterfinal round of the event, Toledo would go up against the only remaining independent team that would make it out of the first round, the independently ran Midland Dow Chemicals works team, which involved players that were working at the Dow Chemical Company in Midland, Michigan (being primarily led by future NBL/NBA player Paul Cloyd, who was named a member of the All-Tournament Second Team this year). Unlike the previous match against the Renaissance, the Jeeps were seen as the favorites of that specific match-up due to their status as a professional team by comparison to the smaller Midland squad, despite the fact that the Dow Chemicals would provide a massive upset victory in the first round against the Syracuse Nationals (now known as the Philadelphia 76ers in the NBA), as well as saw the Midland roster go up against every NBL team in their independent season of play due to them being too late for considerable entry into the NBL this season. While Midland would put up a close fight with Toledo by comparison to what they did to Syracuse, the Jeeps would end up defeating the Dow Chemicals through a close 59–55 victory due to the leading efforts of player-coach Jule Rivlin, Hal Tidrick, and George Sobek.

In the semifinal round, Toledo would go up against the three-time defending WPBT champions, the Fort Wayne Zollner Pistons, which would also count as a rematch between the two teams from the NBL Playoffs after Fort Wayne had bested the Jeeps in a 3–2 during that best-of-five-game series. Unlike the NBL Playoffs, which had multiple games for those two teams to decide the winner between them two, Toledo would end up upsetting the three-time defending champion Zollner Pistons in the single, winner-takes-all match they had against each other with the Jeeps pulling off a 61–56 upset victory through not just the leadership of player-coach Jule Rivlin, but also by the scoring efforts of their rookie star Hal Tidrick (with 18 points scored that night) and Bob Gerber (with 13 points scored that night). As a result of their upset victory over Fort Wayne, this meant that the Zollner Pistons would compete for a third place finish this season (which they got in a blowout win over the Oshkosh All-Stars), while Toledo would compete for a shot at being named the WPBT champions this season.

Finally, for the championship match-up to complete their Cinderella run in the WPBT this year, the Jeeps would go up against the Indianapolis Kautskys, who themselves ended up doing well in the tournament after the first round bye that they had alongside the Fort Wayne Zollner Pistons, as well as saw themselves get their first two wins in the tournament's entire history by beating both the Tri-Cities Blackhawks and the best team of the Western Division this season, the Oshkosh All-Stars, during their own run in this year's event. The Jeeps experienced a 61–46 rout of defeat on their ends, and the Kautskys would complete their upset run for the WPBT's championship this season. With that being said, despite Indianapolis having three of their own players make it to the All-Tournament First Team, it would be Toledo's own player-coach in Jule Rivlin that would receive the honor of being named the WPBT MVP this time around due to his leadership helping the Jeeps out in getting as far as they did in the tournament. Not only that, but Toledo would also see both Hal Tidrick and George Sobek be named members of the All-Tournament Second Team to go with Jule Rivlin being a First Team member there. However, due to a combination of the 1948 event limiting the number of teams participating, money issues, and uncertainty involving the WPBT's own future, this ended up being last WPBT that Toledo ever participated in.

=== Scores ===
- Won first round (62–59) over the New York Renaissance
- Won quarterfinal round (59–55) over the Midland Dow Chemicals
- Won semifinal round (61–56) over the Fort Wayne Zollner Pistons
- Lost championship round (47–62) to the Indianapolis Kautskys

=== Awards and honors ===
- Jule Rivlin, All-Tournament First Team, WPBT MVP
- Hal Tidrick, All-Tournament Second Team, WPBT leading scorer (57 points scored in four games)
- George Sobek, All-Tournament Second Team
