= Deaths in May 1985 =

The following is a list of notable deaths in May 1985.

Entries for each day are listed alphabetically by surname. A typical entry lists information in the following sequence:

- Name, age, country of citizenship at birth, subsequent country of citizenship (if applicable), reason for notability, cause of death (if known), and reference.

== May 1985 ==
- Sir Basil Arthur, 56, New Zealand politician, MP (since 1962).
- Joseph H. Barnett, 53, American politician, member of the South Dakota House of Representatives (since 1967).
- Eugenie Briollet, 84, French Olympic diver (1924).
- Archibald Crossley, 88, American statistician and pollster.
- Howard Emslie, 62, South African cricketer.
- Frank Glieber, 51, American sportscaster, heart attack.
- Robert Holt, 71, Australian politician, MP (1955–1958).
- Regis Malady, 68, American politician, member of the Pennsylvania House of Representatives (1969–1974).
- George Pravda, 68, Czechoslovak actor.
- Albie Reisz, 67, American football player.
- Denise Robins, 88, English novelist.
- Leonard Ross, 39, American writer, legal scholar and game show contestant, suicide by drowning.
- William Jay Schieffelin Jr., 93, American businessman and philanthropist.

=== 2 ===
- Phyllis Bedells, 91, British ballerina and dance teacher.
- Bent Berger, 86, Norwegian judge and politician.
- Attilio Bettega, 32, Italian rally driver, racing collision.
- Dame Bridget D'Oyly Carte, 77, British theatre manager and businesswoman, lung cancer.
- Banarsidas Chaturvedi, 92, Indian writer and journalist.
- Larry Clinton, 75, American trumpeter ("Heart and Soul") and bandleader, cancer.
- Alfredo Corrias, 89, Italian politician.
- Milton S. Eisenhower, 85, American academic administrator.
- Leonard Falcone, 86, Italian-born American musician.
- Ernie Hart, 74, American comic book writer and artist.
- Ole Kielberg, 73, Danish painter.
- Hal Le Roy, 71, American actor and tap dancer.
- Harold C. Ostertag, 88, American politician, member of the U.S. House of Representatives (1951–1965).
- Väinö Suvivuo, 68, Finnish Olympic hurdler (1952).
- Alfred Wilson, 81, Scottish rugby player.

=== 3 ===
- Alexander Aksinin, 35, Soviet Ukrainian painter, plane crash.
- Nathaniel Avery, 46, American golf caddie.
- Wojciech Belon, 33, Polish singer and poet.
- Harry Collins, 65, American magician.
- Jon Gudbjørn Dybendal, 80, Norwegian politician.
- Ruth Forsling, 62, Swedish politician, MP (1964).
- Melvin Fritzel, 78, American college sports coach.
- Werner Jacobi, 81, German physicist.
- Harold Koplar, 70, American hotelier, heart attack.
- Cythna Letty, 90, South African artist.
- Stasys Raštikis, 88, Lithuanian general, heart attack.
- Walter Reside, 79, New Zealand rugby player.
- R. D. Smith, 70, British teacher, radio producer, and possible spy, cirrhosis.
- Sir Percy Spender, 87, Australian politician and diplomat, MP (1937–1951).

=== 4 ===
- Evsei Agron, 53, Soviet-American mobster, shot.
- Jan Appel, 94, German communist activist.
- Ernest Harlington Barnes, 86, Bermudian politician.
- Horatio Fitch, 84, American Olympic runner (1924).
- Emilie Virginia Haynsworth, 68, American mathematician.
- Bill Kunkel, 48, American baseball player and umpire, cancer.
- Alix Mathon, 76, Haitian novelist.
- Clarence Wiseman, 77, Canadian minister, general of The Salvation Army (1974–1977).

=== 5 ===
- Sir Donald Bailey, 83, English civil engineer.
- Carter Brown, 61, English-born Australian novelist, heart attack.
- Gino Buzzanca, 73, Italian actor.
- George Edward Cire, 62, American judge.
- Julián Marchena, 88, Costa Rican poet.
- Daniel R. McLeod, 71, American politician, attorney general of South Carolina (1959–1983).
- Charles Shipman Payson, 86, American baseball executive.
- Helene Rosson, 87, American actress.
- Stefan Szende, 84, Hungarian-Swedish political scientist.
- Piet van Kempen, 86, Dutch track cyclist.
- Angela Vode, 93, Yugoslav Slovenian author and human rights activist.

=== 6 ===
- Nicolai Cikovsky, 90, Russian-American painter.
- Pete Desjardins, 78, American Olympic diver (1924, 1928).
- Henning Elbirk, 76, Danish composer.
- Joe Glenn, 76, American baseball player.
- John C. Heldt, 85, American football player and coach.
- Kirby Higbe, 70, American baseball player.
- Rice Mountjoy, 84, American sports coach.
- William V. Rattan, 94, American football player and coach.
- Johnny Stanley, 79, Australian footballer.
- Francis L. Urry, 77, American actor, heart attack.
- Julie Vega, 16, Filipino actress and singer, cardiac arrest.

=== 7 ===
- Dawn Addams, 54, British actress (The Moon Is Blue, A King in New York, The Saint), lung cancer.
- Luis Arenal Bastar, 76, Mexican artist.
- Miles B. Carpenter, 95, American sculptor.
- Louis Malter, 78, American physicist.
- Líctor Hazael Marroquín García, 42, Mexican vehicle thief, cirrhosis.
- Carlos Mota Pinto, 48, Portuguese politician, prime minister (1978–1979), heart attack.
- Donald Smith, 79, Canadian politician, MP (1949–1953).

=== 8 ===
- Frederick Bailey, 65, English cricketer.
- Robert Halperin, 77, American business executive and Olympic yacht racer (1960, cancer.
- Wilma Scott Heide, 64, American feminist activist and author, heart attack.
- John Herbert Hollomon Jr., 66, American academic administrator.
- Tom Hooson, 52, British politician, MP (since 1979), cancer.
- Karl Marx, 87, German composer.
- Susan Morrow, 52, American actress.
- Edmond O'Brien, 69, American actor (The Barefoot Contessa, Seven Days in May, Fantastic Voyage), complications from Alzheimer's disease.
- Hugh Shaw, 56, Scottish footballer.
- Harry Snell, 68, Swedish Olympic cyclist (1948).
- Skippy Stivers, 81, American football and baseball player.
- Theodore Sturgeon, 67, American fantasy author, pulmonary fibrosis.
- Dolph Sweet, 64, American actor (Gimme a Break!), stomach cancer.

=== 9 ===
- Aksel Airo, 87, Finnish general.
- Homer Barnett, 78-79, American anthropologist.
- Chateaugay, 25, American Thoroughbred racehorse.
- Reginald Dixon, 80, English organist.
- Charlie Drummond, 64, Scottish rugby player.
- Leslie Hale, Baron Hale, 82, British politician, MP (1945–1968).
- Earl Keeley, 48, Canadian football player.
- Bob Kellogg, 67, American football player.
- Neville Linney, 51, Australian footballer.
- Frances Mossiker, 79, American novelist.
- Edward Nash, 83, English cricketer and footballer.
- Svea Norén, 89, Swedish Olympic figure skater (1920).
- Adriaan Paulen, 82, Dutch athlete and sporting official.
- Eric Solomon, 77, Australian politician.
- Rupert Trimmingham, 85, Trinidadian-American soldier.

=== 10 ===
- Tahar Ben Ammar, 95, Tunisian politician, prime minister (1954–1956).
- Pramathanath Bishi, 83, Indian writer and politician, MP (1972–1978).
- Toni Branca, 68, Swiss racing driver.
- Arthur Bronwell, 75, American electrical engineer and academic administrator.
- Walter Burch, 77, American baseball player.
- Sisouk na Champassak, 57, Laotian royal.
- Abbie Cox, 82, Canadian ice hockey player.
- Sir Peter Foster, 72, English barrister.
- Tomás Perrín, 71, Mexican actor.
- Florizel von Reuter, 95, American violinist and composer.
- Les Reynolds, 85, Australian footballer.
- Yin Zizhong, 75-76, Chinese musician and composer.

=== 11 ===
- Johnny Bero, 62, American baseball player.
- Ramón Bragaña, 76, Cuban-Mexican baseball player.
- Bud Engdahl, 66, American basketball player.
- Ria Ginster, 87, German singer.
- Chester Gould, 84, American cartoonist (Dick Tracy), heart failure.
- Patricia McGerr, 67, American novelist.
- Jack Staulcup, 77, American bandleader.
- John Stewart of Ardvorlich, 81, Scottish historian.
- Bud Teachout, 81, American baseball player.

=== 12 ===
- Rodolfo Arízaga, 58, Argentine composer.
- Francis Rodwell Banks, 87, British engineer.
- Emil Beier, 91, German politician.
- Jean Dubuffet, 83, French artist, emphysema.
- Cornelius Van Hemert Engert, 97, Austrian-born American diplomat, pneumonia.
- Katie Kibuka, 62-63, Ugandan feminist activist.
- Halo Meadows, 80, American writer and actress.
- Josephine Miles, 73, American poet and literary critic.
- Ewart Morrison, 85, English cricketer.
- Sir Edward Sayers, 82, New Zealand parasitologist.
- Sid Smith, 56, Australian footballer.
- Song Kok Hoo, 78-79, Singaporean police officer.
- B. Vijayalakshmi, 32, Indian physicist, stomach cancer.
- Steve Weston, 44-45, Canadian actor, fall.
- Bohdan Wodiczko, 73, Polish conductor.

=== 13 ===
- John Africa, 53, American social activist (MOVE), fire.
- Bond Almand, 91, American judge.
- Clotilde Coulombe, 93, Canadian pianist and Roman Catholic nun.
- Rose May Davis, 90, American chemist.
- Selma Diamond, 64, Canadian-born American actress (Night Court) and comedian, lung cancer.
- Leo Disend, 69, American football player.
- Revaz Dogonadze, 53, Soviet Georgian electrochemist and physicist.
- Richard Donovan, 83, American Olympic speed skater (1924).
- Ben Gardner, 65, American basketball player.
- William Harvell, 77, British Olympic cyclist (1932).
- Morley Jennings, 95, American baseball and football player and coach.
- Leatrice Joy, 91, American actress, anemia.
- Sándor Józan, 52, Hungarian diplomat.
- Brian Kelly, 67, Australian footballer.
- Marc Krasner, 72-73, Russian-French mathematician.
- Ti Manno, 31, Haitian singer and musician, AIDS.
- Aleksandr Mikulin, 90, Soviet aircraft engine designer.
- Mildred Scheel, 53, German physician, cancer.
- Leif Sinding, 89, Norwegian journalist and film director.
- Denmei Suzuki, 85, Japanese actor.
- Mary Behrendsen Ward, 91, American poet and author.
- Zhou Enshou, 80-81, Chinese politician.

=== 14 ===
- Elsie Bramell, 75, Australian anthropologist.
- Harry Byrd, 60, American baseball player, lung cancer.
- John T. Clancy, 82, American politician, stroke.
- Alexander Mitchell Donnet, 68, Scottish trade unionist.
- Sammy Downs, 73, American politician, member of the Louisiana House of Representatives (1944–1948) and state senate (1948–1952, 1960–1964).
- María Luisa Escobar, 81, Venezuelan pianist, composer, and musicologist.
- Don Grosso, 70, Canadian ice hockey player.
- Charles Leonard Hamblin, 62, Australian computer scientist and philosopher.
- Bahram Mansurov, 74, Soviet Azerbaijani tar musician.
- Frederick Matthews, 72, English Anglican prelate.
- C. H. Sibghatullah, 71, Indian politician.
- Frank Westmore, 62, American makeup artist.
- Barbara Yung, 26, Hong Kong actress, suicide by gas inhalation.
- Ladislav Ženíšek, 81, Czechoslovak football player and manager.

=== 15 ===
- Junab Ali, 48, Bangladeshi politician.
- Jackie Curtis, 38, American actor, heroin overdose.
- Arthur Faulkner, 63, New Zealand politician, MP (1957–1981).
- Nigel Henderson, 68, English artist and photographer.
- Osmo Kaipainen, 51, Finnish politician, MP (1970–1975).
- Renato Olmi, 70, Italian footballer.
- Emerson Spencer, 78, American Olympic sprinter (1928).
- Christos Tsoutsouvis, 31-32, Greek far-left militant, shot.
- Heinz Wemper, 81, German actor.

=== 16 ===
- Johnny Broaca, 75, American baseball player.
- Hugh Burden, 72, British actor and playwright.
- Guillaume d'Ornano, 90, French industrialist and racehorse breeder.
- Edgard De Caluwé, 71, Belgian racing cyclist.
- Harry Earnshaw, 69, English racing cyclist.
- Margaret Hamilton, 82, American actress (The Wizard of Oz), heart attack.
- Thomas Lyons, 89, Northern Irish politician.
- Maniram, 74, Indian singer and composer.
- Militsa Nechkina, 86, Soviet historian.
- Henry Strasak, 84, American federal agent and intelligence officer.
- A. R. B. Thomas, 80, English chess player.

=== 17 ===
- Abe Burrows, 74, American composer and librettist, complications from Alzheimer's disease.
- Rowland L. Collins, 49-50, American linguist.
- Eugen Dollmann, 84, German diplomat.
- Duncan Drummond, 62, Scottish cricketer.
- Victor Nunes Leal, 70, Brazilian jurist.
- Hans Plesch, 80, German police officer.
- Arnvid Vasbotten, 81, Norwegian politician.
- James Andrew Walsh, 76, Irish hurler.

=== 18 ===
- Harald Andersson, 78, Swedish discus thrower.
- Lillie Barbour, 100, American suffragist and labor activist, heart attack.
- Hedley Bull, 52, Australian political scientist.
- Heleno Fragoso, 59, Brazilian criminologist.
- Del Hughes, 75, American stage manager.
- Nemours Jean-Baptiste, 67, Haitian saxophonist.
- John B. Johnson, 100, American politician, member of the South Dakota Senate (1923–1926).
- Pat Malley, 54, American football coach, cancer.
- Penn Nouth, 79, Cambodian politician, seven-time prime minister.
- Hilding Rosenberg, 92, Swedish composer.
- Hermann Schridde, 47, German Olympic equestrian (1964, 1968), plane crash.
- Robert Shaw, 76, American blues musician, heart attack.
- Sakari Simelius, 84, Finnish general.
- Franciszek Szymura, 72, Polish boxer.
- Tex Terry, 82, American actor.
- Erich Traub, 78, German virologist.
- Edwin Albrecht Uehling, 84, American theoretical physicist.
- Richard von Kienle, 77, German linguist.
- Win Wilfong, 52, American basketball player.

=== 19 ===
- Ivar Campbell, 80, New Zealand-British filmmaker.
- John Martin, 91, American dance critic.
- Primitivo Martínez, 72, Filipino basketball player.
- Alfredo Mayo, 74, Spanish actor.
- Ellen McCullough, 76, English trade unionist.
- Sir Rodney Moore, 79, British general.
- V. Unnikrishnan Nair, 92, Indian writer.
- Johannes Petzold, 72, German hymnwriter.
- Víctor Rodríguez Andrade, 58, Uruguayan footballer.
- Herbert Ruff, 66, German-Canadian pianist.
- Puchalapalli Sundarayya, 72, Indian politician.
- Maqbular Rahman Sarkar, 56-57, Bangladeshi academic administrator.
- Tapio Wirkkala, 69, Finnish sculptor.

=== 20 ===
- Kodzo Ayeke, 61, Ghanaian politician, MP (1954–1960).
- Johnny Fuller, 56. American blues musician.
- Jules Gentil, 87, French pianist.
- Ben Hall, 86, American actor.
- Franz Josef Hirt, 86, Swiss pianist.
- Harm Kamerlingh Onnes, 92, Dutch artist.
- George Memmoli, 46, American actor.
- Hilary Stratton, 78, English sculptor.
- Mary John Thottam, 83, Indian poet and Roman Catholic nun.
- Luis Torralva, 83, Chilean tennis player.
- Kiyohiko Ushihara, 88, Japanese film director.
- Victor Paul Wierwille, 68, American evangelist (The Way International), liver cancer.

=== 21 ===
- Ernie Austen, 93, Australian Olympic racewalker (1924).
- Carl Doehling, 89, American football coach.
- Noel Fisher, 73, Australian footballer.
- Marcel Lanquetuit, 90, French composer.
- Willy Maywald, 77, German photographer.
- Archie McKain, 74, American baseball player.
- Vernon Nkadimeng, 26, South African political activist, car bombing.
- Grover Powell, 44, American baseball player, leukemia.
- Ivan Shchukin, 75, Soviet soldier.
- Hazel Volkart, 78, American composer.
- Kurt Waitzmann, 80, German actor.
- Karl Weber, 87, German politician.

=== 22 ===
- Aleksandr Babaev, 61, Soviet fighter pilot.
- Gerald Case, 80, British actor.
- Henry Raeburn Dobson, 83, Scottish artist.
- Angus Elderkin, 88, Canadian politician, MP (1949–1950).
- Howard Elliott, 80, American politician, member of the Missouri House of Representatives (1937–1953).
- Sir Alister Hardy, 89, British marine biologist.
- Karl-Adolf Hollidt, 94, German army commander and war criminal.
- Charles Murphy, 95, American architect (O'Hare International Airport).
- Rusty Page, 77, New Zealand rugby player and army officer.
- Wolfgang Reitherman, 75, German-born American animator (The Jungle Book, Winnie the Pooh and the Blustery Day, Pinocchio), traffic collision.
- Ion Șiclovan, 64, Romanian footballer.
- Gábor Vaszary, 87, Hungarian novelist and screenwriter.

=== 23 ===
- Pedro Coronel, 63, Mexican artist.
- María Currea Manrique, 94, Colombian feminist activist and politician.
- Lloyd Glenn, 75, American R&B and blues musician, heart attack.
- Harry Houghton, 79, British civil servant and Soviet spy (Portland spy ring).
- Julia de Lacy Mann, 93, English economic historian.
- Whitey Wilshere, 72, American baseball player.

=== 24 ===
- Saeed Ahmad Akbarabadi, 76-77, Indian Islamic scholar and linguist.
- Dave Brown, 87, American baseball player.
- Joe Darensbourg, 78, American jazz musician, complications from a stroke.
- Michel Écochard, 80, French architect and urban planner.
- Geoffrey Gorer, 80, English anthropologist.
- Lucy Jarvis, 88, Canadian artist.
- Howard B. Lee, 105, American politician, attorney general of West Virginia (1925–1933).
- Andy MacDonald, 55, American football player.
- A. R. McCabe, 88, American politician, lieutenant governor of Idaho (1946–1947).
- Dave Miller, 59, American record producer.
- Natalio Perinetti, 84, Argentine footballer.

=== 25 ===
- John Carmody, 46, Australian footballer.
- Renée Cretté-Flavier, 82, French Olympic diver (1928).
- Edwin C. Dutton, 57, Malaysian footballer.
- Josephine D. Edwards, 42, Australian mathematician.
- George Faulkner, 84, Australian footballer.
- Gerry Fiennes, 78, British railway manager.
- Henry Franklin, 83, English cricketer.
- Gordon Glenwright, 67, Australian actor and playwright.
- Robert Bruce Hall, 64, American Episcopalian prelate.
- Herta Hammerbacher, 84, German landscape architect.
- Henry Hunter, 77, American actor.
- Charles McGeoch, 85, American football player and coach.
- Kiyoshi Nakamura, 71, Japanese Olympic runner (1936).
- Robert Nathan, 91, American novelist (Portrait of Jennie) and poet, kidney failure.
- Walter W. Powers, 62, American politician, member of the California State Assembly (1962–1974).
- Nikolai Schei, 84, Norwegian jurist.

=== 26 ===
- Robert D. Coe, 83, American diplomat.
- Harold Hecht, 77, American film producer (Marty), cancer.
- Gordon Hobson, 60, New Zealand wrestler.
- Magne Oftedal, 64, Norwegian linguist.
- Tatsukuma Ushijima, 81, Japanese judoka.
- Hendrika van Rumt, 87, Dutch Olympic gymnast (1928).

=== 27 ===
- Skeeter Best, 70, American jazz guitarist.
- Kay Campbell, 80, American actress, injuries sustained in a traffic collision.
- William C. Christianson, 92, American jurist.
- Dairoku Harada, 68, Japanese archaeologist.
- Henry Hebbe, 69, Norwegian Olympic speed skater (1948).
- Kai Lindberg, 85, Danish politician.
- George Moss, 71, Australian politician.
- Janko Puhar, 65, Yugoslav Olympic swimmer (1948).
- Bob Readick, 59, American actor.
- Solomon David Sassoon, 69, English rabbi and philanthropist.
- Archie Stark, 87, Scottish-born American soccer player.
- Les Willis, 63, Australian footballer.
- Arthur Wright, 65, English footballer.

=== 28 ===
- George Devereux, 76, Hungarian-French ethnologist.
- Juan Estrada, 72, Argentine footballer.
- Haakon Hansen, 78, Norwegian Olympic boxer (1924).
- Mamed Iskenderov, 69, Soviet Azerbaijani politician.
- Kathryn Kelly, 81, American bootlegger and convicted kidnapper.
- Roy Plomley, 71, English radio broadcaster and playwright.
- Olle Rinman, 77, Swedish Olympic sailor (1924).
- Loren L. Ryder, 85, American sound engineer.
- Alfredo Sciarrotta, 78, Italian-American silversmith.
- Șerban Țițeica, 77, Romanian quantum physicist.

=== 29 ===
- Sir Robert William Doughty Fowler, 71, British diplomat.
- Henry Guerlac, 74, American science historian.
- Christian Hartmann, 74, Norwegian composer.
- Armas Leinonen, 84, Finnish politician, MP (1952–1970).
- Max Lemke, 90, German general.
- Ron Mudge, 64, Australian footballer.
- Gunnar Nielsen, 57, Danish middle distance runner.
- Sam Stoller, 69, American Olympic runner (1936).
- Einar Thorsrud, 62, Norwegian psychologist.
- Billy Zitzmann, 89, American baseball player.

=== 30 ===
- George Anderson, 94, Canadian soccer executive.
- Olga Anstei, 73, Russian-American poet.
- George K. Arthur, 86, English actor and film producer.
- Gustav Jaenecke, 77, German tennis and ice hockey player.
- Talbot Jennings, 90, American screenwriter and playwright.
- Ross Jones, 67, New Zealand rugby player.
- Witold Lipski, 35, Polish computer scientist, cancer.

=== 31 ===
- A. A. Adams, 84, American politician, member of the Washington House of Representatives (1969–1981).
- W. A. Boyle, 80, American mining union leader and convicted murder-for-hire conspirator.
- Rein de Waal, 80, Dutch Olympic field hockey player (1928, 1936).
- Jake Early, 70, American baseball player.
- Sokichi Furutani, 71, Japanese convicted serial killer, execution by hanging.
- Pepsi Paloma, 18, Filipino actress, suicide by hanging.
- Gaston Rébuffat, 64, French mountaineer.
- Louis Robert, 81, French epigraphist.
- Samudrala Jr., 61-62, Indian screenwriter and lyricist.
- Arne Sande, 80, Danish Olympic boxer (1928).
- Joan Young, 47, American actress.
