= Stalcup =

Stalcup is a surname. Notable people with this surname include:

- Apryll Stalcup, Irish chemist
- Clyde Stalcup Bloomfield (1936–2011), baseball player
- Jack Staulcup, founder of the Jack Stalcup Orchestra
- Jerry Stalcup (1938–2025), American football player
- Mary Stalcup Markward (1922–1972), American FBI agent
- Wilbur Stalcup (1910–1972), American basketball coach and college athletics administrator
