= Roy L. Cheeseman =

Canadian politician

Roy Cheeseman

MHA for Hermitage
- In office 1972–1973
- Preceded by: Harold Piercey
- Succeeded by: Roger Simmons

Minister of Fisheries
- In office May 1, 1972 – May 2, 1973
- Preceded by: Frank Moores
- Succeeded by: Harold Collins

Personal details
- Born: Roy Cheeseman

Roy Lawrence Cheeseman (1921 – August 14, 2003) was a businessman and politician in Newfoundland. He represented Hermitage in the Newfoundland House of Assembly from 1972 to 1973.

The son of John T. Cheeseman and Mona Ludlow, he was born in Port au Bras and was educated at Bishop Feild College, King's College School, and Shaw Business School in Toronto. He served in the Royal Canadian Air Force during World War II. Cheeseman was a co-founder of General Trade Ltd. in St. John's. From 1949 to 1957, he was a division manager for Bowring Brothers. In 1958, he joined West Atlantic Products Ltd. as a manager, becoming company president in 1960. In 1962, Cheeseman was president of the Newfoundland Board of Trade.

He was elected to the Newfoundland assembly in 1972 and served in the provincial cabinet as Minister of Fisheries. Cheeseman retired from the assembly in 1973, becoming president of West Atlantic Products Ltd. and Clarenville Ocean Products Ltd.

Cheeseman died in a palliative care centre in St. John's at the age of 81.
