= Harry Collins (disambiguation) =

Harry Collins (born 1943) is an English academic.

Harry Collins may also refer to:

- Harry J. Collins (1895–1963), US Army general
- Rip Collins (pitcher) (Harry Warren Collins, 1896–1968), American baseball pitcher
- Harry Collins (footballer) (1892–1918), Australian rules footballer
- Harry Collins (magician) (1920–1985), official corporate magician for the Frito-Lay company

== See also ==
- Henry Collins (disambiguation)
- Harold Collins (disambiguation)
- Collins (surname)
- Harry Collinson Owen (1882–1956), British journalist and author
