= Aksinin =

Aksinin (masculine, Russian: Аксинин) or Aksinina (feminine, Russian: Аксининa) is a Russian surname. Notable people with the surname include:

- Aleksandr Aksinin (1954–2020), Soviet sprinter
- Alexander Aksinin (1949–1985), Russian-Ukrainian printmaker and painter
