= Henry Collins =

Henry Collins may refer to:

- Henry Collins (politician) (1844–1904), mayor of Vancouver
- Henry Collins (official) (1905–1961), U.S. citizen, government employee and Soviet spy
- Henry Collins (boxer) (born 1977), boxer from Australia
- Henry Collins (artist) (1910–1994), artist and designer
- Henry Clay Collins (1883–1950), American politician, member of the Mississippi State Senate
- Henry B. Collins (1899–1987), Smithsonian Institution anthropologist and archeologist
- Henry Powell Collins, British Member of Parliament for Taunton, 1819–1820
- Henry Collins (Royal Navy officer), active during the American War of Independence, see Battle of Chestnut Neck
- Henry Collins, music producer under the name Shitmat

== See also ==
- Harry Collins (disambiguation)
