= Malter effect =

Phenomenon describing positive charge caused by ionising radiation

The Malter effect is named after Louis Malter, who first described the effect. Following exposure to ionizing radiation (e.g., electrons, ions, X-rays, extreme ultraviolet, vacuum ultraviolet), secondary electron emission from the surface of a thin insulating layer results in the establishment of a positive charge on the surface. This positive charge produces a high electric field in the insulator, resulting in the emission of electrons through the surface. This tends to pull more electrons from further beneath the surface. Eventually the sample replenishes the lost electrons, by picking up the collected secondary electrons through the ground loop.

The Malter effect often arises in wire chambers (aka drift chambers). After six years of operation, the BES III science team reported on a serious problem caused by the effect and how they coped with the problem.

For cathode aging, a polymer formation deposits on the cathode surfaces. This insulating layer prevents the neutralization of positive ions, leading to the formation of a surface charge. The charge induces a high electric field which can be enhanced enough to extract electrons from the cathode. Most of them recombine with positive ions immediately, but some of them drift to the anode and generate avalanches at the sense wire. The avalanche positive ions come back to the cathode, enhance the electric field of the insulating layer, and thus feed a continuous, self-sustaining local discharge in the chamber without external irradiation. This effect is called the Malter effect ...

== Bibliography ==
- Malter, Louis (1936-07-01). "Thin Film Field Emission". Physical Review. 50 (1): 48–58. Bibcode:1936PhRv...50...48M. doi:10.1103/physrev.50.48. ISSN 0031-899X.
