= Jheronimus Bosch Art Center =

Art center in 's-Hertogenbosch, Netherlands

Jheronimus Bosch Art Center (JBAC), New St. James Church
- Jheronimus Bosch Art Center (JBAC), Nieuwe Sint Jacobskerk
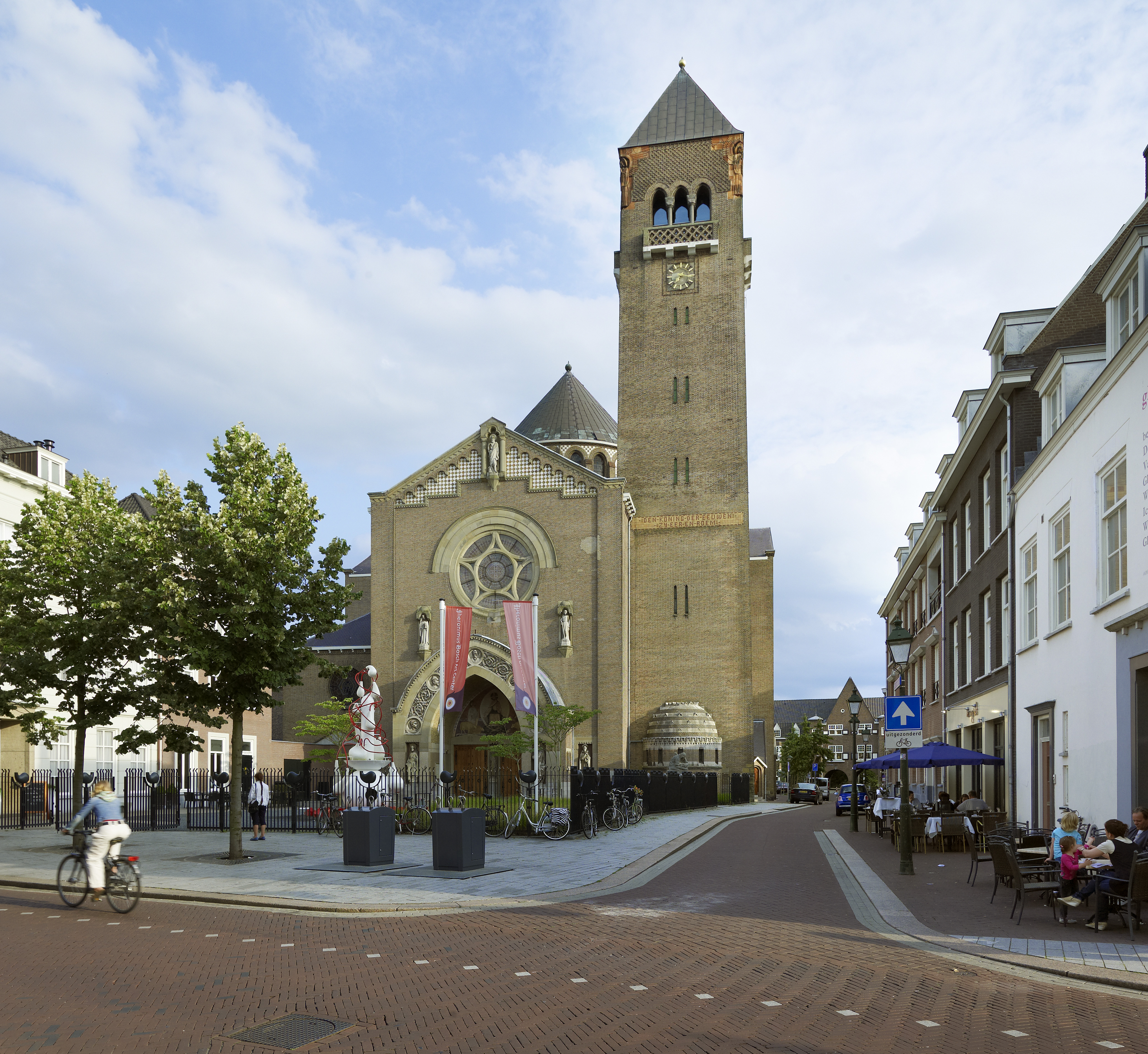
- Northern façade JABC
- Established: 2007
- Location: Hinthamerstraat 177, 's Hertogenbosch
- Coordinates: 51.688066°N 5.312227°E
- Type: Permanent exhibition, Events centre
- Website: https://jheronimusbosch-artcenter.nl/?lang=en

The Jheronimus Bosch Art Center is a museum located in the former New St. James Church on Jeroen Boschplein in 's-Hertogenbosch, the capital of North Brabant, in the Netherlands. Since 2007, there has been a permanent retrospective exhibition here on the life and work of the painter Hieronymus Bosch, who was born in the town. The venue is also used for concerts and conferences.

== The New St. James Church ==
=== Predecessors of the current church ===
's-Hertogenbosch had several churches consecrated to James the Great, In Dutch: Jakobus de Meerdere. The first was the 15th century church St. James Church on the Bethaniestraat. After the Siege of 's-Hertogenbosch in 1629 the victors turned it into the Big Arsenal, known in Dutch as Groot Tuighuis.

The parish of St. James then had to worship in private homes or clandestine churches. The Franco-Dutch War eased religious tensions, and made that the parish could build a chapel in Sint Jacobs Street. In 1691 it got official permission to extend this place of worship.

In 1804 the parish built its first church at the same location. On 25 June 1844 the construction of a new church, which would incorporate the choir of the old church was tendered. The new church was built in neo-classical style with a wooden dome to a design by Arnoldus van Veggel. It was consecrated on 13 October 1846. On 30 October 1865 lightning struck the dome, the description reminiscent of ball lightning. Later the dome became unstable, leading to the demolishment of this church. The current New St. James Church was built on the floor plan of this second church.

=== The current church ===
The New St. James Church is a former church built in 1907. It was ordered in early 1905. The first stone was laid on 19 March 1906. The church was consecrated in 1907. The tower was finished later, in 1923-1924. It ceased to be a church in 2002. The whole church is a national monument.

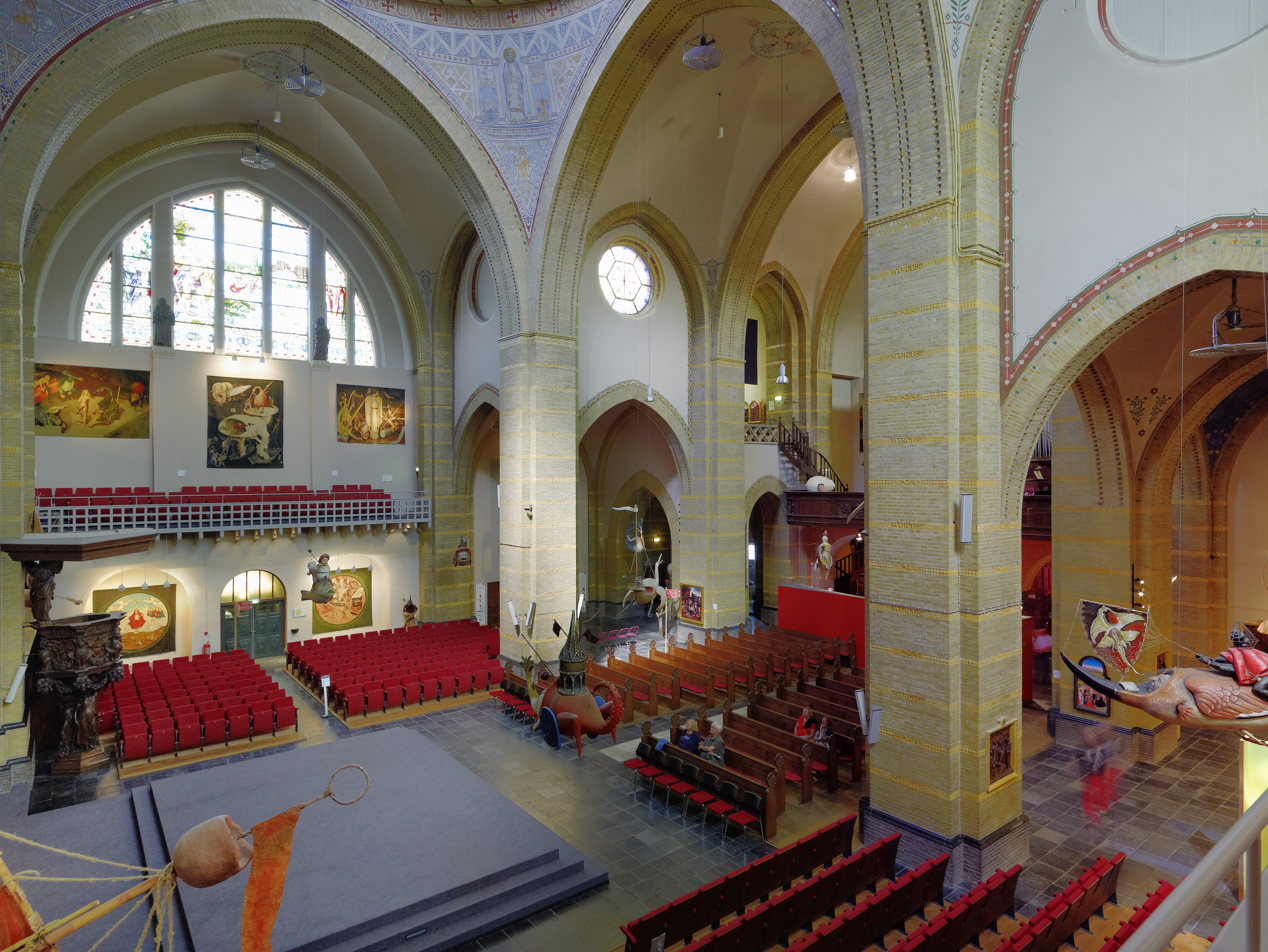
Interior from near the organ

The architects were Jan Stuyt and Jos Cuypers, who designed the church in Byzantine Revival style. It is a three aisles cruciform church with a centralized floorplan. The crossing of the church is crowned by a lantern tower. Next to the northern arm there is a 40+ m high clock tower, which was originally planned to become much higher. The tower is modeled on an Italian bell tower.

The space in front, i.e. north of the church was originally a built up area. In 1928 the entrance was moved from the western to the northern façade. This new and current entrance is decorated by statues of saints dating from 1927-'32. In 1932 the houses in front of this façade were demolished and a parking lot was created. When the Jeroen Bosch Art Centre was established in the church, the parking lot became a town square.

The fixed interior of the church is a fine specimen of contemporary architecture. The inside of the dome proper shows the Star of Bethlehem with the constellations visible in Europe and was painted by F.J. Kops.

The movable parts of the interior originate from the previous church. There is a baroque pulpit from 1635 by Erasmus Quellinus, with an eighteenth century sounding board. The balcony before the organ is also baroque and was bought in Antwerp in 1804. Several statues date from the eighteenth century, as well as an oak communion bench. Two confessional booths date from the seventeenth, and two date from the nineteenth century. A pneumatic organ by Michaël Maarschalkerweerd was bought in 1900. The baptismal font dates from the early nineteenth century. The tower has a mechanic clock which is wound up by electricity, but this no longer functions in this way.

== The Museum ==
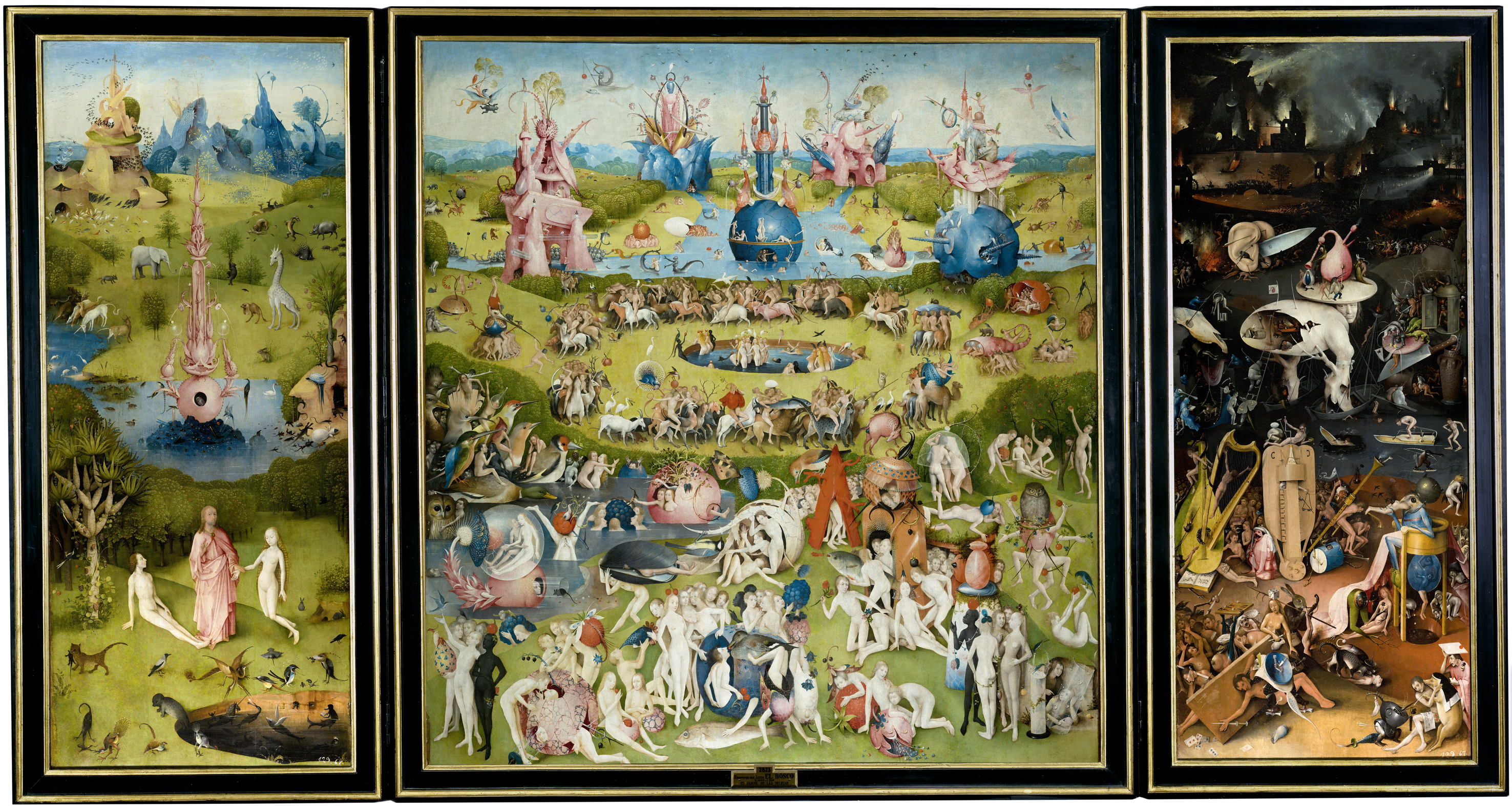
The Garden of Earthly Delights

=== Initiative ===
The painter Jheronimus Bosch is the most famous inhabitant of 's-Hertogenbosch, but paintings by Bosch can no longer be found in the city. This also applies to the Netherlands as a whole, because many of Bosch's works were taken to Spain as spoils of war during the Eighty Years' War.

The idea for Jheronimus Bosch Art Center came from the Municipality of 's-Hertogenbosch. The New St. James Church had been empty for some time, and was no longer used by the Catholic Church after 2002. It was also a monument that could not be demolished, and was located in the city center. The idea to show Bosch's works in the city through copies was not new. The idea to create a separate museum and to show all his works probably was. The centre was opened on 26 March 2007 by Pieter van Vollenhoven.

=== The Replicas exhibition ===
The main part of the exhibition consists of around 60 photographic replicas of the paintings and drawings of Jheronimus Bosch. This represents his complete works. The size of the reproductions of course reflects the true size of the paintings, and the frames have also been faithfully reproduced. The effect is that one can experience the work of Bosch in relative quite in the atmosphere (i.e. a church) that was the intended place for many of these works.

=== Other parts of the permanent exhibition ===
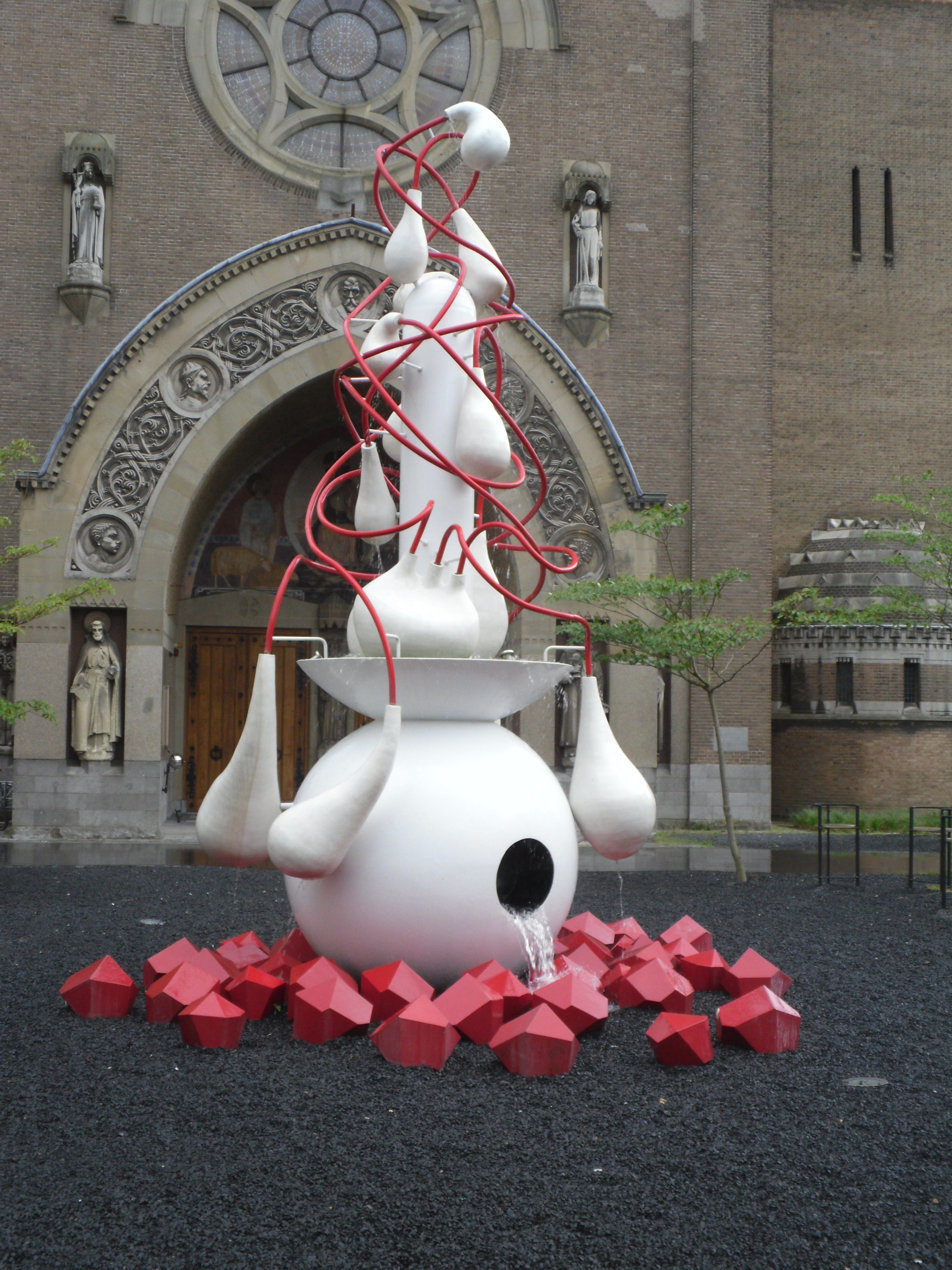
Fountain outside the church

A selection of contemporary works of art, inspired by, or associated with Bosch, is also part of the permanent exhibition. Some of the fantastic creatures and objects found in Bosch's paintings have been turned into sculptures and these may be found positioned around the exhibition space and hanging from the ceilings. A number of specially commissioned wall tapestries, containing details from Bosch's paintings, adorn the upper walls of the main hall. These were created by Polish brothers Andrzej and Jerzy Mierzejewski.

Standing in one corner of the main hall is the working reconstruction of a medieval astronomical clock, including moving figures representing the procession of the Biblical Magi and the Last Judgement. A smaller exhibition, downstairs, in the former boiler room of the church, is a historical mock-up of how Jheronimus Bosch's studio may have looked.

In the square in front of the church is a sculpture by Ruudt Peters. The inspiration for this came from a fountain, which can be seen in one of Bosch's most famous paintings, The Garden of Earthly Delights.

=== Scenic view from the tower ===
A transparent glass lift in the church tower leads up to further exhibition spaces and to the highest level at 40 meters, whence one can enjoy impressive views over the city.

== Other activities ==
Jheronimus Bosch Art Center is also used for concerts and conventions.

== Gallery ==
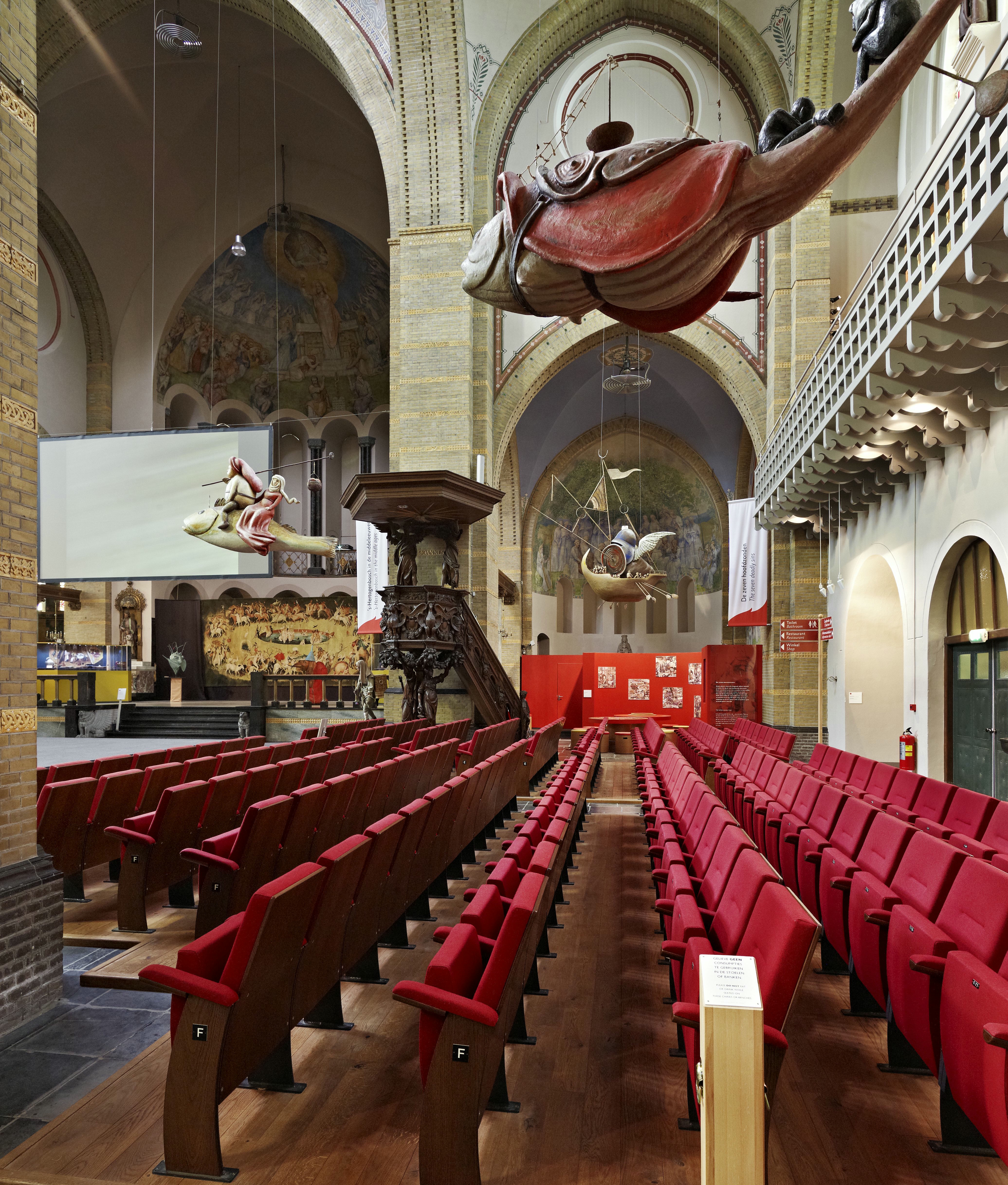

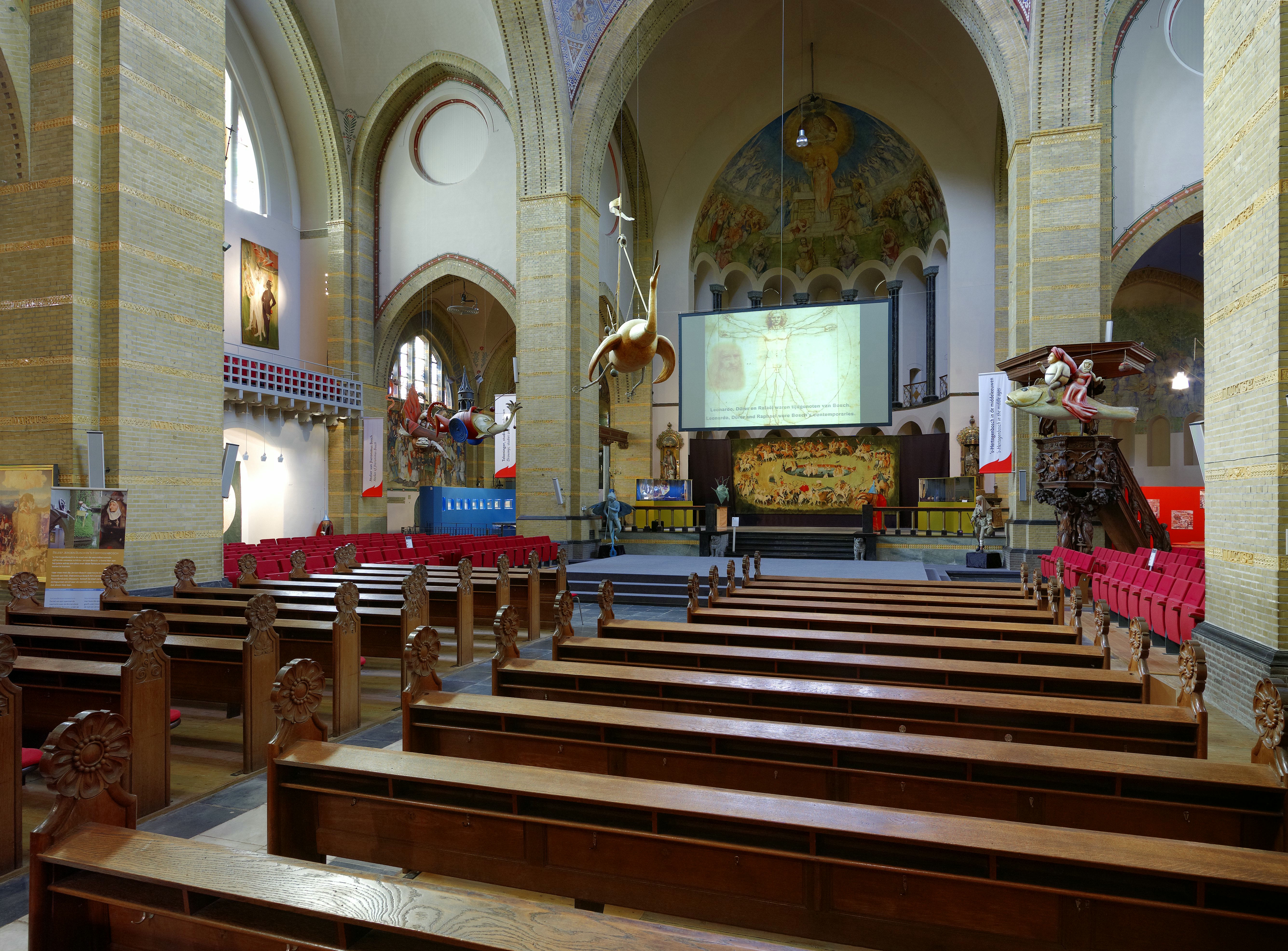

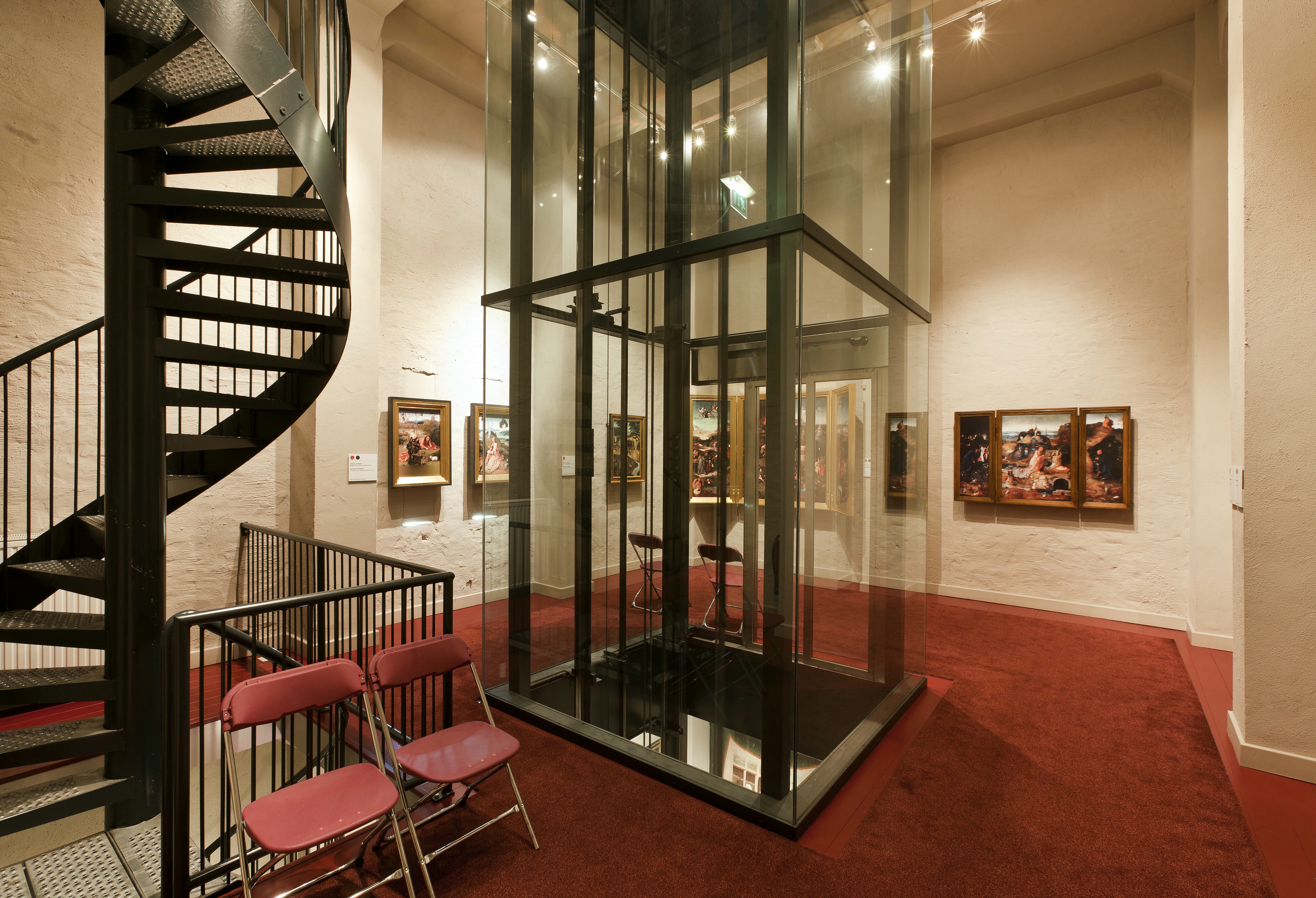

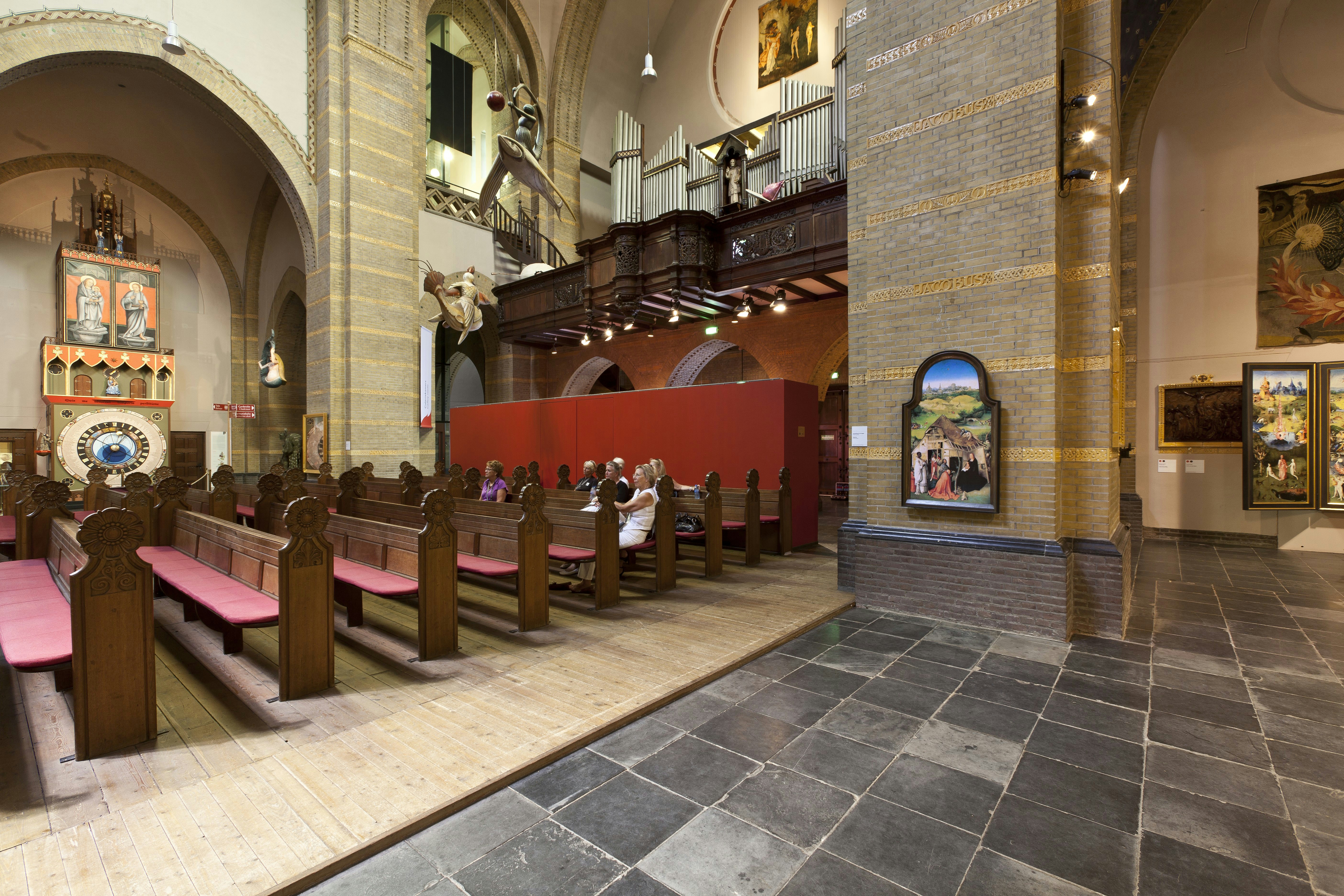

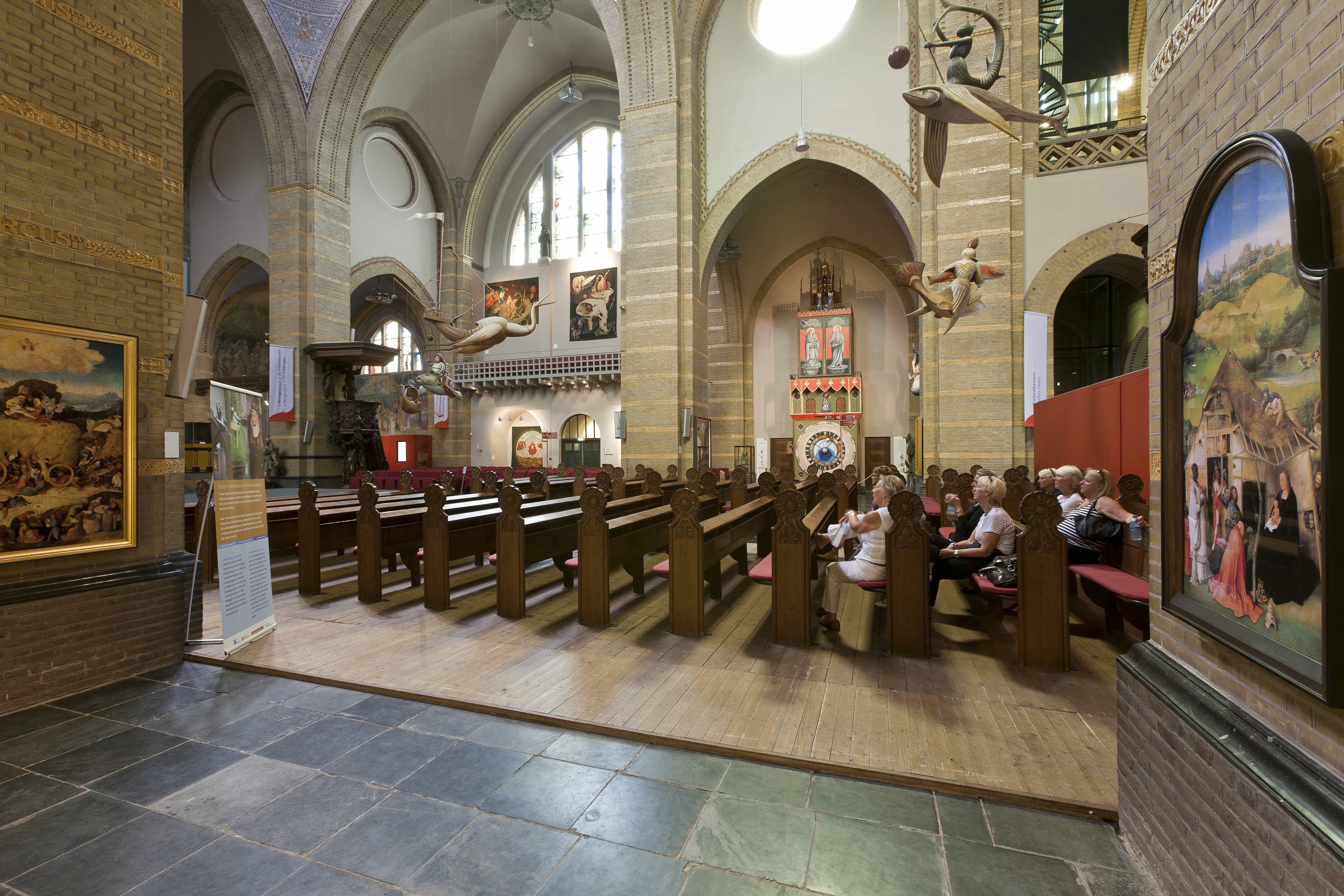
