= Alfredo Sciarrotta =

Italian-American silversmith and maritime weapons expert (1907–1985)

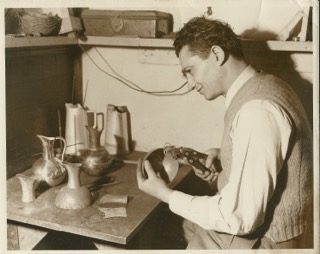
- Sciarrotta in studio
- Born: May 25, 1907; Rossano, Calabria, Italy
- Died: May 28, 1985; Newport, Rhode Island
- Education: Alessandro Volta School of Engineering
- Known for: Silversmithing
- Spouse: Margherita Russo

Alfredo Sciarrotta (May 25, 1907 – May 28, 1985) was an Italian-American silversmith and undersea weapons expert.

== Silversmith Work ==
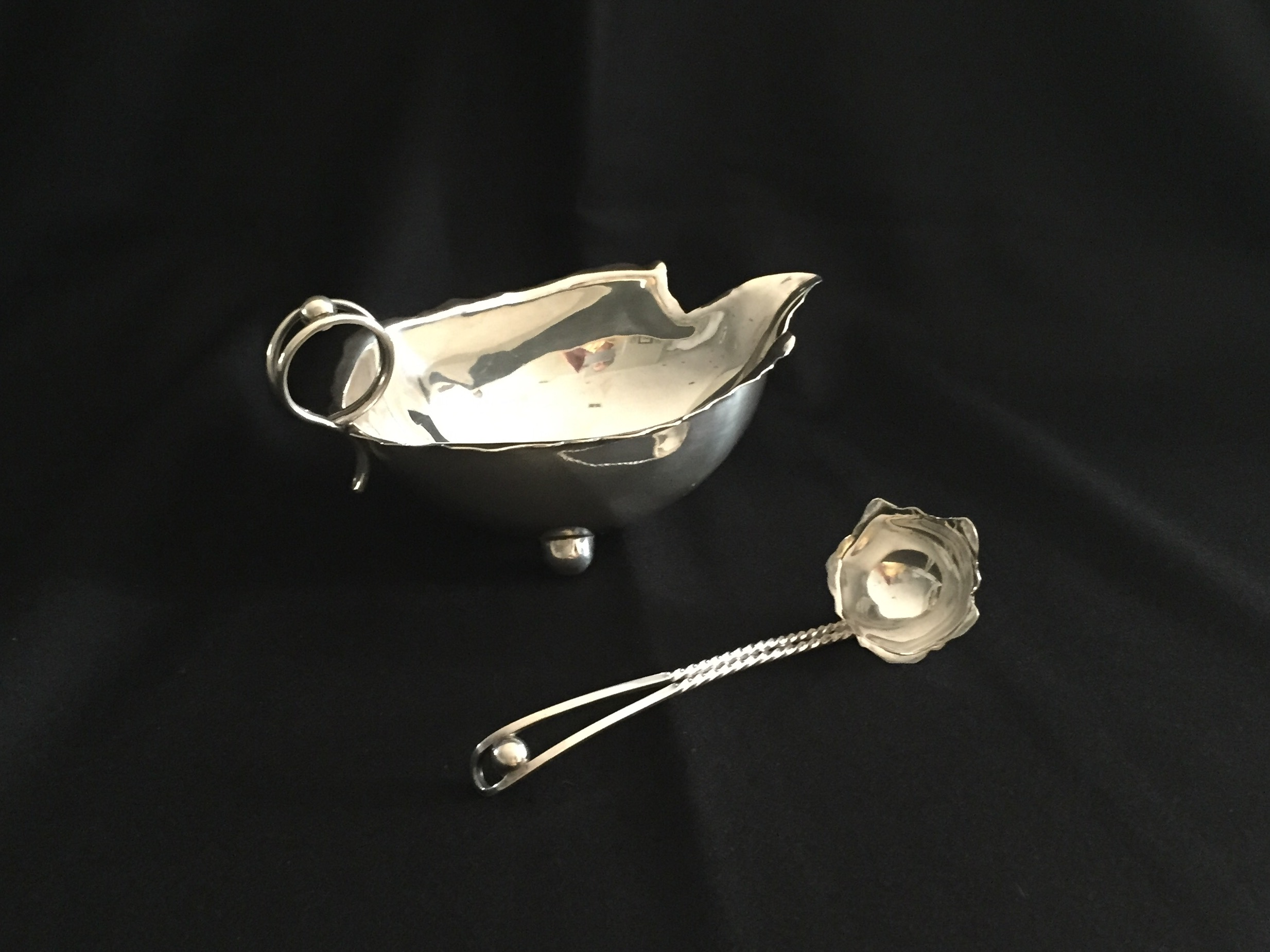
Sciarrotta Silver Gravy Boat and Ladle

Sciarrotta's work is characterized by a sleek and simple style, and many of his smaller pieces feature his signature leaf-shaped designs. During the 1950s and 1960s, Sciarrotta’s handmade silver serving dishes, bowls, candelabra, vases, trays, cigarette boxes, etc. were sold at the most exclusive American retailers from coast to coast, including Georg Jensen, Cartier, and Black Starr and Gorham in New York City; Bailey Banks & Biddle in Philadelphia; Gump’s in San Francisco; Shreve, Crump & Low in Boston; and many more. His designs became known as “The Wedding Gift of Philadelphia and Newport” and he was often referred to as the "Modern Cellini;" This was also the title used for his brochure, which was given to retailers and collectors and included in gift packages.

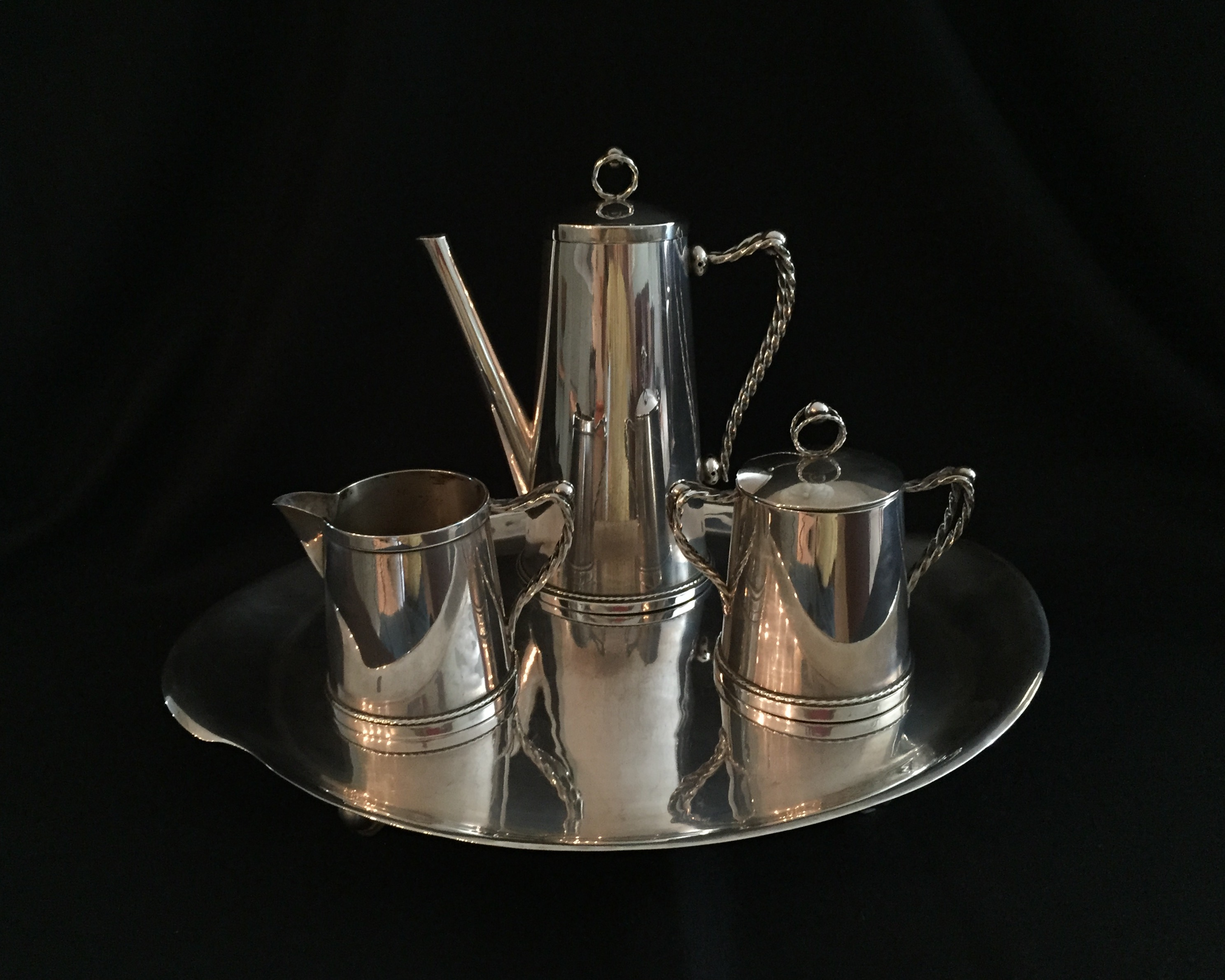
Sciarrotta Silver Coffee Set

Sciarrotta's work was commissioned for gifts presented by the City of Newport to visiting dignitaries, including President Eisenhower, the Italian President Giovanni Gronchi, fighter Rocky Marciano, and Mayor Delmas of Antibes, France in 1962. In 1958, a Sciarrotta bowl was commissioned as a gift to the Ambassador of Israel to the United States Abba Eban, on the occasion of the Newport Rhode Island Jewish Community's Tercentenary, marking the 300th anniversary of the founding of the oldest Jewish congregation in the United States. The bowl was presented to Ambassador Eban by Colonel Milton E. Mitler at the Belcourt Palace in the presence of Governor Dennis Roberts. Also in 1962, a Sciarrotta bowl in the shape of the hull of a 12-meter yacht was presented to Sr. Frank Packer, skipper of the “Gretel”, America’s Cup challenger for Australia. His bowls were presented as trophies for horse races around the country. Several of his pieces are on display at the Kentucky Derby Museum at Churchill Downs. His work is currently displayed in the Newport Art Museum, and his former studio is now an art school run by the Museum.

== Life ==
The son of a dry goods merchant, Sciarrotta studied mechanical engineering at Alessandro Volta School of Engineering in Naples, Italy and remained in Naples working at a munitions factory during the years before World War II.

Sciarrotta came to the U.S. in 1943 to play a major role in a clandestine Office of Strategic Services (OSS) operation carried out at the U.S. Naval Torpedo Station in Newport, Rhode Island. As an engineer whose undersea weapons expertise was acquired in Naples, Italy under the scientist Carlo Colossi, who invented the first magnetic torpedo exploder for the Germans during World War II, Sciarrotta was a critical asset to the U.S Navy when Italy fell to the Allies.

To protect the secret hardware for the Allied war effort, Sciarrotta and a team of scientists and engineers were smuggled out of Italy with weapon-related hardware and tools plus two small submarines and a torpedo that Sciarrotta knew had been sunk by the Germans in Naples Harbor. The result of the mission in Newport at the Naval Torpedo Station was the building of the first two-man submarine as well as exploding magnetic torpedo devices. The submarine and original devices brought from Italy were placed in the U.S. Naval Academy Museum. Sciarrotta led the project under the code name Robert West.

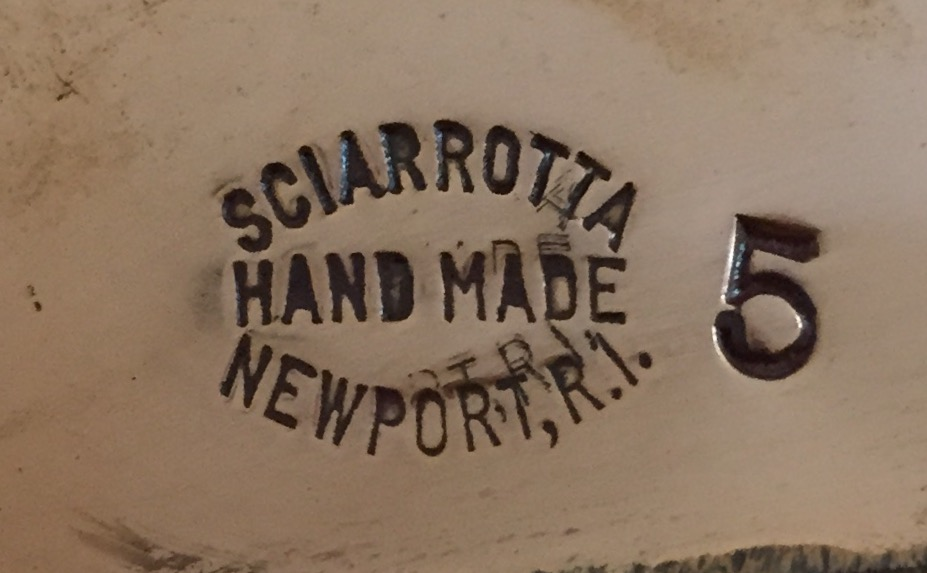
Sciarrotta Trademark

Upon completion of the mission, Sciarrotta was offered a government position to stay on at the Naval Torpedo Station. Instead he decided to follow his artistic interests and develop of his craft, creating art objects of copper, brass and eventually sterling silver, applying the same precision and skill to his patented designs as to his weaponry. He opened a shop in Newport married his English teacher, a native Newporter named Margherita Russo, and raised three daughters.

Sciarrotta died in Newport, Rhode Island, on May 28, 1985, after suffering from lung cancer. He was survived by three daughters, three grandchildren, and three great-grandchildren.
