= Ernest Harlington Barnes =

Ernest Harlington Barnes (3 April 1899 – 4 May 1985) was a Bermudian dairy farmer, member of the Legislative Council of Bermuda and politician for the United Bermuda Party.
