= Johnny Stanley =

Australian rules footballer, born 1905

Personal information
- Full name: John Francis Stanley
- Born: 26 November 1905; Steiglitz, Victoria
- Died: 6 May 1985 (aged 79); Noble Park, Victoria
- Original team: Lilydale

Playing career^{1}
| Years | Club | Games (Goals) |
| 1930 | Footscray | 2 (0) |
- ^{1} Playing statistics correct to the end of 1930.

John Francis Stanley (26 November 1905 – 6 May 1985) was an Australian rules footballer who played with Footscray in the Victorian Football League (VFL).
