= Louis Malter =

American physicist

Louis Malter (April 28, 1907 – May 7, 1985) was an American physicist specializing in vacuum tube research and high-vacuum systems. He is known for his 1936 discovery of the eponymous Malter effect.

== Biography ==
Louis Malter was born on April 28, 1907, in New York City. He graduated in 1926 with a B.S. from the College of the City of New York. He then taught physics at the college from 1926 to 1928. In 1931, Malter received his M.A. from Cornell University, and he received his Ph.D. in 1936. After receiving his Ph.D., Malter was employed by the RCA, first working in the Acoustic Research and Photophone Division between 1928 and 1930, then at the RCA Manufacturing Company between 1933 and 1942.

In 1941, Malter was elected a Fellow of the American Physical Society. From 1943 to 1946, Malter led the RCA Manufacturing Company's Special Development Division. In May 1946, Malter became the head of the Naval Research Laboratory's Vacuum Tube Research Section in Washington, D.C., before returning to RCA in 1949. Between 1949 and 1955, Malter corresponded with Leonard Benedict Loeb. In the early 1950s, Malter was the Chief Engineer of the RCA Semiconductor Division. In the late 1950s, he was recruited to direct the Varian Vacuum Division of Varian Associates in Palo Alto, California. In the 1970s, Malter acted as an expert on high-vacuum systems at Linus Pauling's Institute of Orthomolecular Medicine.

== Personal life ==
Malter died on May 7, 1985, in San Mateo, California. He was married twice, and had three children.

== Selected publications ==
- Wolff, Irving; Malter, Louis (1929). "Sound Radiation from a System of Vibrating Circular Diaphragms". Physical Review. 33 (6): 1061–1065. Bibcode:1929PhRv...33.1061W. doi:10.1103/PhysRev.33.1061.
- Wolff, Irving; Malter, Louis (1930). "Directional Radiation of Sound". The Journal of the Acoustical Society of America. 2 (2): 201–241. Bibcode:1930ASAJ....2..201W. doi:10.1121/1.1915251.
- Zworykin, Vladimir K.; Morton, George A.; Malter, L. (1936). "The secondary emission multiplier—a new electronic device". Proceedings of the Institute of Radio Engineers. 24 (3): 351–375. doi:10.1109/JRPROC.1936.226435. S2CID 51654458.
- Malter, L.; Marcuvitz, N. (1938). "On a Modification of Hickman's Distillation Pump". Review of Scientific Instruments. 9 (3): 92–95. Bibcode:1938RScI....9...92M. doi:10.1063/1.1752444.
- Malter, L.; Langmuir, D. B. (1939). "Resistance, Emissivities and Melting Point of Tantalum". Physical Review. 55 (8): 743–747. Bibcode:1939PhRv...55..743M. doi:10.1103/PhysRev.55.743. (After receiving his Ph.D. from Massachusetts Institute of Technology, D. B. Langmuir worked for RCA in Harrison, New Jersey. During WW II he worked with Vannevar Bush. "Obituary. Dr. David Bulkeley Langmuir". Los Angeles Times. February 2, 2003.)
- Langmuir, D. B.; Malter, L. (1939). "The Rate of Evaporation of Tantalum". Physical Review. 55 (8): 748–749. Bibcode:1939PhRv...55..748L. doi:10.1103/PhysRev.55.748.
- Malter, L.; Brewer, G. R. (1949). "Microwave Q Measurements in the Presence of Series Losses". Journal of Applied Physics. 20 (10): 918–925. Bibcode:1949JAP....20..918M. doi:10.1063/1.1698253.
- Johnson, E. O.; Malter, L. (1950). "A Floating Double Probe Method for Measurements in Gas Discharges". Physical Review. 80 (1): 58–68. Bibcode:1950PhRv...80...58J. doi:10.1103/PhysRev.80.58. 1950 (over 850 citations)
- Bernardini, M.; Malter, L. (1965). "Vacuum Problems of Electron and Positron Storage Rings". Journal of Vacuum Science and Technology. 2 (3): 130–141. Bibcode:1965JVST....2..130B. doi:10.1116/1.1492415.
