= Katie Kibuka =

- Born: Katolini Esita Ndagire Kibuka; 1922
- Died: 12 May 1985 (aged 62–63)
- Education: Gayaza High School
- Occupations: Activist, Educator
- Known for: Founding the first preschool for African children in Uganda, YWCA leadership, advocacy for women and children
- Children: 4

Katolini Esita Ndagire Kibuka, known as Katie Kibuka (1922 – May 12, 1985) was a Ugandan activist in the colonial era. Katie Kibuka advocated for women's rights, while sustaining a passion for children.

== Early life and education ==
Born to a Christian family, which put a great deal of emphasis on education, Katie, a Ganda, attended Gayaza High School, later teaching home economics there.

== Career and activism ==
Having traveled to the United States to study the workings of the Young Women's Christian Association, she was among the founders of the Ugandan chapter, and was actively involved with both the Mothers' Union and the Uganda Council of Women. The Mothers' Union is a movement striving to help support families in need. The YWCA was founded in 1855 and was a social movement that regards such things as civil rights and freedom of women. Katie was an influential President of the important organization. When her husband retired, the couple moved to Nangabo, which is a sub-county in Uganda. There she founded the Nangabo Center as a community meeting place for people in need. The center provided support and encouragement for the education of girls and Katie ran a preschool, as well. Katie felt children were an inspiration to her, as she had four of her own. Katie also served as an interpreter for Mary Ainsworth during her work with Ugandan mothers. Mary Ainsworth was a developmental psychologist in Uganda. Katie had a strong passion for children, which led her to become the founder of a childcare organization from her home. With the help of her supportive husband, she founded the first pre-school for African children in Uganda. She was a productive member of society and was actively involved in her church. She participated in several organizations in her church by helping those in need. She was a part of The Provincial Committee of the Church of Uganda and the Missionary Board of the Church of England. Katie died on May 12, 1985, after living a remarkable and fulfilled life of serving others.
