= Melvin Fritzel =

American football and basketball player and coach (1906–1985)

Biographical details
- Born: July 13, 1906; Wellsburg, Iowa, U.S.
- Died: May 3, 1985 (aged 78); Grundy Center, Iowa, U.S.

Playing career

Football
- 1926–1929: Iowa State Teachers

Basketball
- 1926–1930: Iowa State Teachers

Coaching career (HC unless noted)

Football
- 1933–1934: William Penn

Basketball
- 1932–1933: Iowa State Teachers
- 1933–1935: William Penn

Head coaching record
- Overall: 4–10–1 (football); 22–23 (basketball)

Melvin Roy Fritzel (July 13, 1906 – May 3, 1985) was an American football and basketball player and coach. He served as the head football coach at William Penn College—now known as William Penn University—in Oskaloosa, Iowa from 1933 to 1934, compiling a record of 4–10–1. He was head basketball coach at his alma mater, Iowa State Teachers College—now known as the University of Northern Iowa, in 1932–33, tallying a mark of 9–4.

== Head coaching record ==
=== Football ===
Year	Team	Overall	Conference	Standing	Bowl/playoffs
Penn (Iowa) Quakers (Iowa Conference) (1933–1934)
1933	Penn	2–6	2–3	8th	
1934	Penn	2–4–1	1–3–1	10th	
Penn:		4–10–1	3–6–1		
Total:		4–10–1			
