= Frederick Bailey (cricketer) =

English cricketer

Personal information
- Full name: Frederick Raymond Bailey
- Born: 2 November 1919; Newcastle-under-Lyme, Staffordshire, England
- Died: 8 May 1985 (aged 65); Wolstanton, Staffordshire, England
- Batting: Left-handed

Domestic team information
- Years: Team
- 1950–1960: Minor Counties
- 1939–1963: Staffordshire

Career statistics
Competition	First-class
Matches	3
Runs scored	118
Batting average	29.50
100s/50s	–/1
Top score	79
Balls bowled	–
Wickets	–
Bowling average	–
5 wickets in innings	–
10 wickets in match	–
Best bowling	–
Catches/stumpings	–/–
- Source: Cricinfo, 30 November 2011

Frederick Raymond Bailey (2 November 1919 – 8 May 1985) was an English cricketer. Bailey was a left-handed batsman. He was born in Newcastle-under-Lyme, Staffordshire.

Bailey made his debut for Staffordshire in the 1939 Minor Counties Championship against Northumberland. He played Minor counties cricket for Staffordshire from 1939 to 1963 (excluding the six seasons in which there was no county cricket due to World War II), making 124 appearances. In 1950, he made his first-class debut for a combined Minor Counties team against the Marylebone Cricket Club at Lord's. He made two further first-class appearances for the Minor Counties, against the touring Indians in 1959 and the touring South Africans in 1960. In these three first-class matches he scored a total of 118 runs at an average of 29.50, with a high score of 79. This score came against the Indians.

He died at Wolstanton, Staffordshire on 8 May 1985.
