= Harold Collins =

Harold Collins may refer to:

- Harold Collins (strongman) (born 1957), American strongman and powerlifter
- Harold Collins (Australian politician) (1887–1962), politician in Queensland, Australia
- Harold Collins (Canadian politician) (1925–2015), Canadian politician
- Hal Collins (Harold L. Collins, 1926–2016), American football coach
- Major General Harold E. "Tom" Collins (American Test Pilot) (1924-2018) Air Force Test Pilot

== See also ==
- Harry Collins (disambiguation)
