= Noel Fisher (footballer) =

Australian rules footballer, born 1912

Personal information
- Born: 26 February 1912
- Died: 21 May 1985 (aged 73)
- Original team: Colac
- Height: 179 cm (5 ft 10 in)
- Weight: 78 kg (172 lb)

Playing career^{1}
Years	Club	Games (Goals)
1934–35	Fitzroy	7 (4)
- ^{1} Playing statistics correct to the end of 1935.

Noel Fisher (26 February 1912 – 21 May 1985) was an Australian rules footballer who played with Fitzroy in the Victorian Football League (VFL).
