= 1985 Zolochiv mid-air collision =

1985 mid-air collision

Coordinates: 49°50′26.86″N 24°51′52.39″E

Accident
- Date: 3 May 1985
- Summary: Mid-air collision involving ATC errors
- Site: Near Zolochiv, Ukrainian SSR, Soviet Union
- Total fatalities: 94
- Total survivors: 0

First aircraft
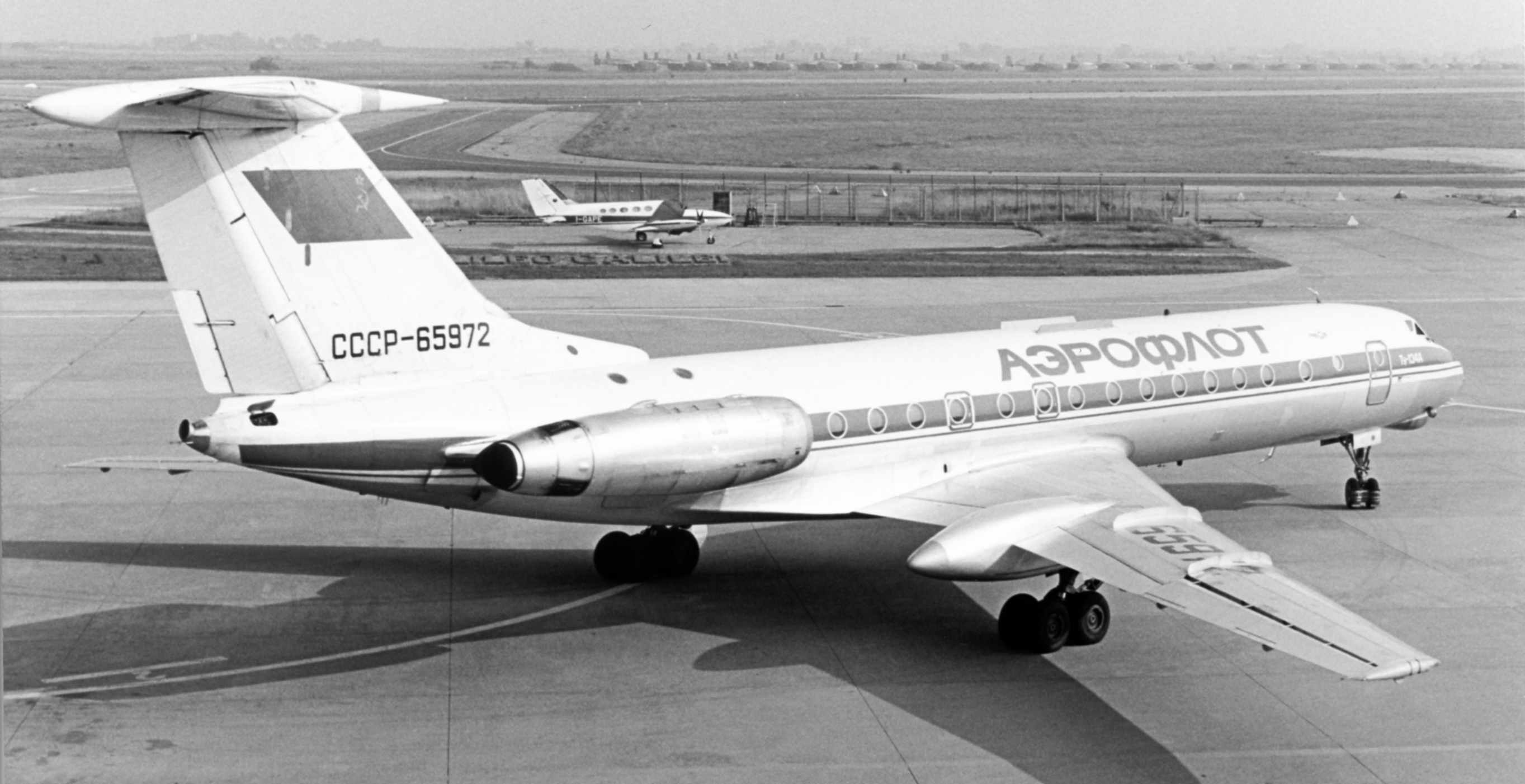
- A Tu-134 similar to the one that crashed
- Type: Tupolev Tu-134A
- Operator: Aeroflot
- Registration: CCCP-65856
- Flight origin: Tallinn Airport, Estonian SSR, Soviet Union
- Stopover: Lviv, Ukrainian SSR, Soviet Union
- Destination: Chişinău, Moldavian SSR, Soviet Union
- Passengers: 73
- Crew: 6
- Fatalities: 79
- Survivors: 0

Second aircraft
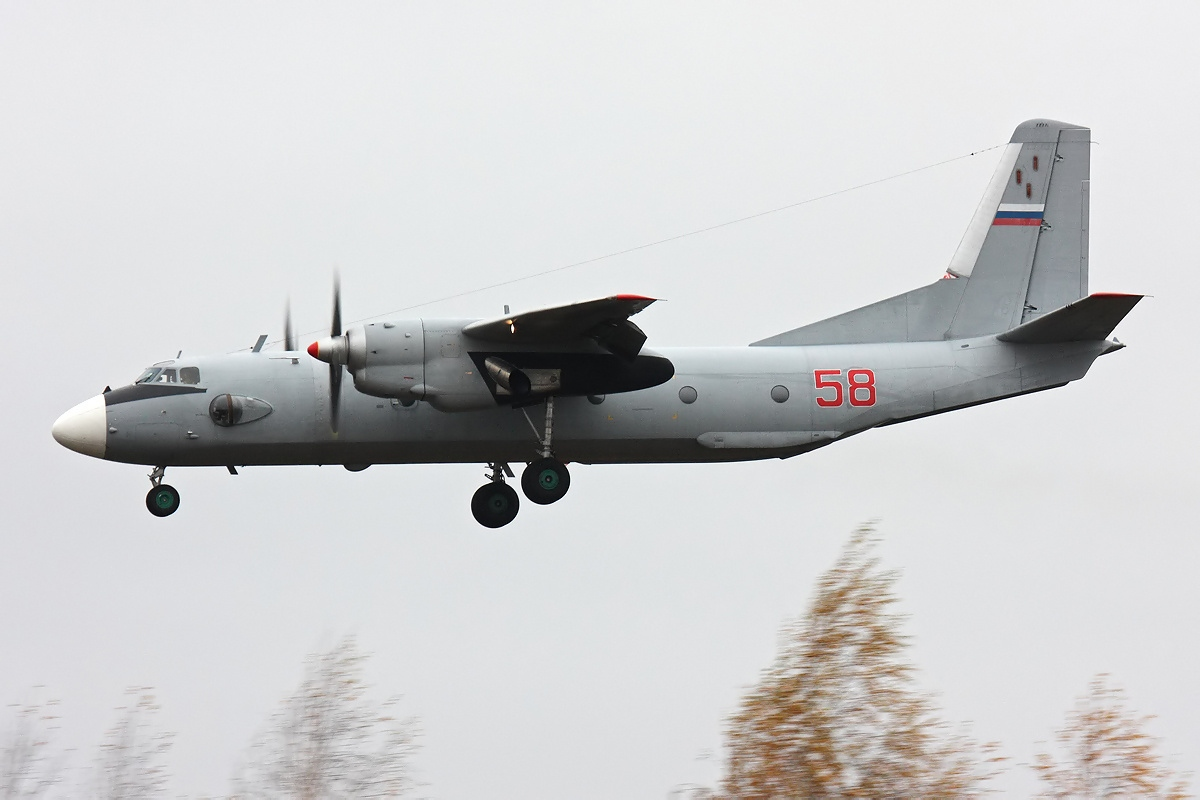
- An Antonov An-26 similar to the one that crashed.
- Type: Antonov An-26
- Operator: Soviet Air Force
- Registration: 101 red (call-sign CCCP-26492)
- Passengers: 9
- Crew: 6
- Fatalities: 15
- Survivors: 0

The 1985 Zolochiv mid-air collision occurred on 3 May 1985 between Aeroflot Flight 8381 (Tu-134) and a Soviet Air Force An-26.

== History ==
Aeroflot Flight 8381, a scheduled flight of a twin-engine Tupolev Tu-134 that departed Tallinn Airport in Estonian SSR, Soviet Union, at 10:38 am on 3 May 1985, for Chişinău in Moldavian SSR, Soviet Union making a stopover at Lviv, Ukrainian SSR, Soviet Union. While descending to Lviv in overcast weather, it collided at 12:13 with Soviet Air Force Antonov An-26 which had just taken off from Lviv. The collision occurred at an altitude of 13,000 feet (4,000 m) (flight level 130). Both aircraft lost their right wings and tails, went out of control and crashed about one or two minutes later near the town of Zolochiv, Ukrainian SSR, Soviet Union, killing all 94 people on both aircraft.

Civil and military air traffic controllers mislocated both aircraft involved, leading to violations of air traffic control rules. Among the victims of the disaster were graphics artist Alexander Aksinin, the young Estonian table-tennis player Alari Lindmäe (born 15 September 1967) and two generals of the Soviet Army. The captain of the Aeroflot aircraft, Nikolai Dmitrijev (born 18 October 1931), was a Hero of Socialist Labor and one of the Soviet Union's most decorated civil airline pilots.
