= Hans Plesch =

German SS-Brigadeführer and Munich police chief

- Born: 26 February 1905; Wilhelmshaven, Kingdom of Prussia, German Empire
- Died: 17 May 1985 (aged 80) Oldenburg, West Germany
- Allegiance: Nazi Germany
- Branch: Schutzstaffel (SS); German Army
- Service years: 1930–1937; 1940–1945; 1940–1943
- Rank: SS-Brigadeführer and Generalmajor of police; Leutnant
- Commands: Police President of Munich
- Conflicts: Second World War (eastern front)
- Awards: Knights Cross of the Iron Cross; Wound Badge in silver

Hans Plesch (26 February 1905 – 17 May 1985) was an SS-Brigadeführer and Generalmajor of police who served as the Police President in Munich from 12 May 1943 until the city was liberated on 30 April 1945. He also served with the Wehrmacht in the Second World War and was awarded the Knights Cross of the Iron Cross.

== Early life ==
Born in Wilhelmshaven, Plesch attended the gymnasium in Oldenburg. After passing his abitur, he studied law from 1923 at the Ludwig-Maximilians-Universität München, the University of Würzburg, and the University of Göttingen. He also became active in the German Student Corps at these schools. He passed the first state law examination in 1930 and, after completing a legal clerkship in Oldenburg, he passed the assessor examination on 19 December 1932. From February 1933 he worked as a lawyer in Oldenburg.

== SS and Wehrmacht service ==
Plesch first joined the Nazi Party in 1923. When the Party was banned in 1924, he joined the Oldenburg branch of the Völkisch-Social Bloc. He rejoined the Nazi Party (membership number 347,695) on 1 October 1930 and also became a member of the Schutzstaffel (SS number 4,339) on 1 December 1930. From this point on, he worked part-time as a legal adviser with the 24th SS-Standarte in Oldenburg and in November 1932 became a battalion adjutant. He was commissioned as an SS-Untersturmführer effective 20 April 1933. From 15 May 1934 to 15 April 1936, he was the full-time personnel officer for the SS–Oberabschnitt (Upper Section) Nord, headquartered in Hamburg. He was then assigned as the Chief of Staff of SS–Abschnitt (Section) XVI in Magdeburg. He left this full-time job with the SS on 1 June 1937 to become the manager of his father-in-law's Opel automotive wholesale business in Oldenburg.

During the Second World War, Plesch was drafted into the Wehrmacht in February 1940 and was also reinstated in the SS in December of that year. He participated in military action on the eastern front with the rank of Leutnant of reserves. While serving as the commander of the 12th company of the 6th Infantry Regiment, he was awarded the Knight's Cross of the Iron Cross on 21 March 1942.

Plesch was discharged from the Wehrmacht on 9 February 1943 and was posted to an administrative job at the police headquarters in Düsseldorf for two months. On 7 April 1943 he was selected to be acting Police President in Munich, formally taking office on 12 May in succession to SA-Brigadeführer Franz Mayr and becoming permanent on 12 October 1943. Plesch attained his final promotion to SS-Brigadeführer on 30 January 1944 and was authorized to wear the uniform of a Generalmajor of police. On 30 April 1945, when the city of Munich was liberated by the U.S. 3rd Infantry Division, Plesch was taken into custody. No details are known about his internment and denazification. He later worked again as an automotive wholesaler in Oldenburg and died there in May 1985.

SS ranks
Date	Rank
20 April 1933	SS-Untersturmführer
1 July 1934	SS-Obersturmführer
9 November 1934	SS-Hauptsturmführer
9 November 1935	SS-Sturmbannführer
20 April 1939	SS-Obersturmbannführer
9 November 1941	SS-Standartenführer
30 January 1943	SS-Oberführer
30 January 1944	SS-Brigadeführer

== Sources ==
- Lilla, Joachim: Plesch, Hans in Staatsminister, leitende Verwaltungsbeamte und (NS-)Funktionsträger in Bayern 1918 bis 1945.
- Scherzer, Veit (2007). Die Ritterkreuzträger 1939–1945 Die Inhaber des Ritterkreuzes des Eisernen Kreuzes 1939 von Heer, Luftwaffe, Kriegsmarine, Waffen-SS, Volkssturm sowie mit Deutschland verbündeter Streitkräfte nach den Unterlagen des Bundesarchives (in German). Jena: Scherzers Miltaer–Verlag. ISBN 978-3-938845-17-2.
- Yerger, Mark C. (1997). Allgemeine-SS: The Commands, Units and Leaders of the General SS. Schiffer Publishing Ltd. ISBN 0-7643-0145-4.
