= Lillie Barbour =

American suffragist and labor activist

- Born: March 3, 1885; Rocky Mount, Virginia, U.S.
- Died: May 18, 1985 (aged 100); Roanoke, Virginia, U.S.
- Occupations: Suffragist, labor activist

Lillie Mary Clinedinst (née Barbour; March 3, 1885 – May 18, 1985) was an American suffragist and labor activist.

== Early life and family ==
Barbour was born on March 3, 1885, in Rocky Mount, Virginia, the daughter of James Randolph Barbour and Abigail Ferguson Barbour. Barbour lived and worked in Virginia until moving to Nevada around 1924.

In 1925, Barbour married Joseph B. Clinedinst, who had previously served alongside her as a factory inspector for the Virginia Bureau of Labor, and who later served as the Nevada State Labor Commissioner.

== Activism ==
Barbour was a notable advocate for multiple causes including the labor movement, women's right to vote, and child protection.

=== Labor organizer ===
In the early 1900s, Barbour began work as a seamstress and garment factory worker and was a member of the Local Union No. 48 of the United Garment Workers of America in Roanoke, Virginia. She was elected as a board member of the union and served as its secretary. In 1910, she was a member of the strikes committee for the Virginia Federation of Labor, where she encouraged union members to only buy union-made clothes.

From 1915 to 1916, Barbour was an active member of the legislative committee for the federation, successfully lobbying the Virginia General Assembly to enact legislation including increased protections for law enforcement, first responders, and firefighters. She also advocated for equal hiring practices to encourage women to be police officers. Barbour was an elected delegate to the American Federation of Labor in 1917, 1919, and 1926. In 1921, Barbour was elected as the state organizer for the federation. In the role, Barbour traveled throughout Virginia and to other states to organize women workers, including in Louisiana in 1922.

After moving to Reno, Nevada, around 1924, Barbour remained active in the labor movement and served as secretary-treasurer of the Nevada State Federation of Labor for over eight years. In her role as secretary-treasurer, Barbour helped mobilize union volunteers and resources in support of Franklin D. Roosevelt in the 1932 United States presidential election.

=== Suffrage ===
By around 1910, Barbour was circulating petitions calling for an amendment to the Constitution of Virginia to grant women the right to vote. Barbour was an early member of the Equal Suffrage League of Virginia. She traveled throughout the state and spoke to various women's groups and labor unions about the importance of women's suffrage and how it related to the improvement of working conditions.

In 1914, Barbour testified before the Virginia House of Delegates Committee on Privileges and Elections to advocate for women's suffrage. While the effort was unsuccessful, Barbour continued her advocacy over the next several years, while also supporting efforts to found a women's college at the University of Virginia through the Co-Ordinate College League of Virginia.

Barbour continued to encourage the broader labor movement to support the cause of women's suffrage, and in 1917 she played a key role in the Virginia Federation of Labor's formal endorsement of women's suffrage at its annual convention.

After women earned the right to vote nationally after the ratification of the Nineteenth Amendment in 1920, Barbour remained active in the cause of promoting women's voter registration and civic engagement. After moving to Nevada, she was an active member of the Nevada League of Women Voters and was elected as its state secretary.

== Public service ==
From 1910 until 1917, Barbour was appointed as a factory inspector for the Virginia Bureau of Labor. In the role, she traveled throughout the state and investigated violations of state workplace laws related to safety, sanitation, and child labor. She cited hundreds of factories and establishments for violations.

In 1915, Governor of Virginia Henry Carter Stuart appointed Barbour as one of Virginia's delegates to the National Child Labor Convention. In April 1917, Governor Stuart appointed Barbour as the only woman to serve on the newly established Virginia Industrial Council of Safety, which was tasked with investigating conditions contributing to the Great Northward Migration of Virginia's African Americans and providing recommendations to the governor and legislature.

Barbour was appointed as an inspector for the United States Children's Bureau in 1917. She traveled throughout the United States to factories, canneries, shipyards, and various other industrial workspaces, where she worked to enforce compliance with the Keating-Owen Child Labor Act of 1916. Later, Barbour worked for the Internal Revenue Service as a tax inspector focusing on child labor issues.

As a federal appointee, Barbour was a member of the Association of Governmental Labor Officials of the United States and Canada, where she chaired a session on child labor in 1922 and remarked that no state in the United States had "the proper facilities for enforcing every section of its law for the protection of children."

Barbour opposed prohibition in the United States and was elected as a delegate to Nevada's convention to repeal the Eighteenth Amendment in 1933, serving as the convention's elected secretary. During the 1930s, she also served as president of the Nevada Department of Education Auxiliary.

During World War II, Barbour was the president of the Reno chapter of the American Legion Auxiliary, helping to lead home-front activities in support of the war effort. She later served as the auxiliary's National Committeewoman representing the State of Nevada.

She later served as president of the Reno Women's Civic Club in the 1960s.

=== Nevada State Assembly election ===
Barbour was a candidate for the Nevada State Assembly in 1944 as a Democrat. She was unsuccessful in the Democratic primary.

== Death ==
Barbour returned to Virginia to live in a Roanoke nursing home during her final years, and died from a heart attack on May 18, 1985, two months after her 100th birthday. She is buried in Mountain View Cemetery in Vinton, Virginia.
