= Apryll Stalcup =

American chemist

Apryll Marie Stalcup
- Education: California State University, Sacramento; Georgetown University
- Scientific career
- Workplaces: Dublin City University; National Institute of Standards and Technology; Missouri University of Science and Technology; University of Hawaiʻi at Mānoa; University of Cincinnati
- Thesis: Studies in reversed-phase liquid chromatography (1988)

Apryll Marie Stalcup FRSC is an American chemist who is Professor and was the Director of the Irish Separation Science Cluster at Dublin City University. She was awarded the 2021 Chromatography Forum of the Delaware Valley Stephen Dal Nogare Award, the 2015 American Microchemical Society Benedetti Pichler Award and named in the 2016 Power List of the Top 50 Women Analytical Scientists worldwide. Her research considers surface-confined ionic liquids and chiral separations.

== Early life and education ==
Stalcup has described herself as a military brat, and spent her childhood in several different locales. She completed her undergraduate degree in chemistry at the California State University, Sacramento, after training in southern and northern California. As an undergraduate student she worked several different jobs to cover her costs. After working for a couple of years at Versailles, Inc as an analytical chemist, she moved to Georgetown University as a doctoral researcher. Stalcup completed her doctoral research in 1988. During her graduate work, she held a joint position as a fellow at the National Institute of Standards and Technology (NIST) in Gaithersburg, Maryland. Stalcup joined the Missouri University of Science and Technology as a postdoctoral fellow. Early in her academic career Stalcup was introduced to chiral separation chemistry by Daniel W. Armstrong and first interacted with capillary electrophoresis columns.

== Research and career ==
In 1990, Stalcup moved to the University of Hawaiʻi at Mānoa, where she was appointed to the faculty in the Department of Chemistry. In Hawaii, Stalcup worked on carbohydrate-based phases for chiral separations. Here she proposed the use of the chiral additives sulphated-β-cyclodextrin, heparin and quinine in capillary electrophoresis. The carbohydrate-based bonded phases are designed to include chiral recognition elements, and have been intelligently designed for the separation of optical isomers. After six years in Hawaii, Stalcup moved to the University of Cincinnati, where she was made full professor by 2001. Whilst in the United States, Stalcup served on the advisory board of the Greater Cincinnati Water Works.

In 2012, Stalcup moved to Ireland, where she was made Director of the Irish Separation Science Cluster and Professor of Chemical Sciences at Dublin City University. Stalcup served as a council member of the Royal Society of Chemistry Analytical Division.

== Awards and honours ==
- 2011 American Chemical Society Cincinnati Chemist of the Year
- 2015 American Microchemical Society Benedetti Pichler Award
- 2016 Power List of Top 50 Women Analytical Scientists
- 2016 Fellow of the Royal Society of Chemistry
- 2021 The Chromatography Forum of the Delaware Valley Stephen Dal Nogare Award

== Selected publications ==
- Schneiderman, E.; Stalcup, A. M. (9 January 2001). "ChemInform Abstract: Cyclodextrins: A Versatile Tool in Separation Science". ChemInform. 32 (2): no. doi:10.1002/chin.200102265. ISSN 0931-7597.
- Vaher, M; Koel, M; Kaljurand, M (2002). "Application of 1-alkyl-3-methylimidazolium-based ionic liquids in non-aqueous capillary electrophoresis". Journal of Chromatography A. 979 (1–2): 27–32. doi:10.1016/s0021-9673(02)01499-1. ISSN 0021-9673. PMID 12498230.
- Stalcup, Apryll M.; Gahm, Kyung H. (1996). "Application of Sulfated Cyclodextrins to Chiral Separations by Capillary Zone Electrophoresis". Analytical Chemistry. 68 (8): 1360–1368. doi:10.1021/ac950764a. ISSN 0003-2700. PMID 8651498.
