= Alexander Aksinin =

Soviet Ukrainian printmaker and painter (1949–1985)

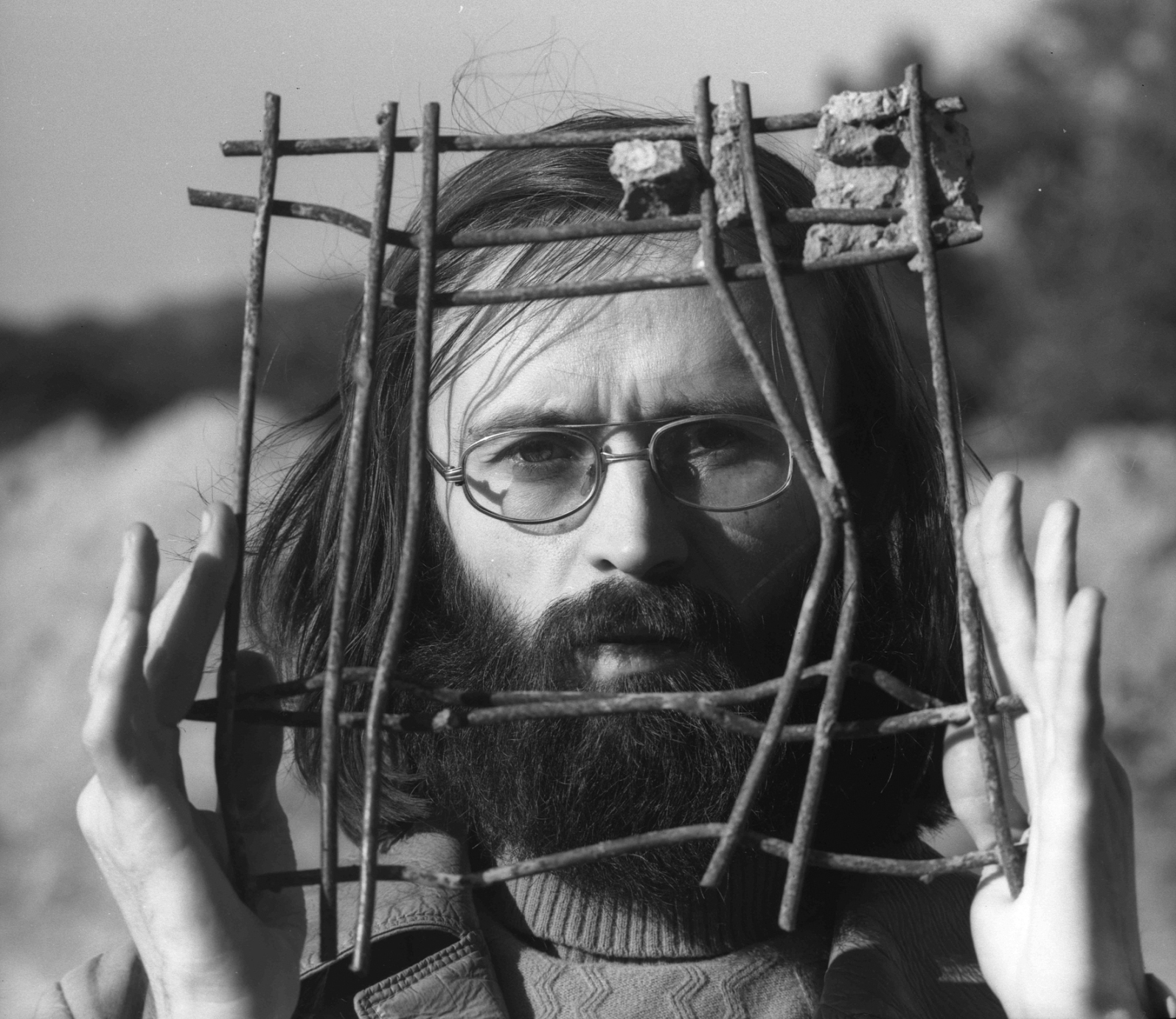
- Born: 2 October 1949; Lviv, Soviet Union
- Died: 3 May 1985 (aged 35) near Zolochiv, Ukraine
- Education: Ukrainian Institute of Printing
- Known for: Graphic art

Alexander Aksinin (2 October 1949 – 3 May 1985) was a Ukrainian printmaker and painter. His sophisticated etching technique, precision and perfectionist attention to details earned him the sobriquet the “Dürer of Lviv”. Art critics hailed him as “a 20th century Piranesi” for his dramatic and elaborate constructs.

== Early life and education ==
Alexander Aksinin was born to military cartographer Dmitriy Aksinin and railroad official Ludmila Aksinina. In 1972 he graduated from the Ukrainian Institute of Printing, where he specialized in Graphics Arts.

== Career ==
From 1972 to 1977, Aksinin worked as an art editor in a publishing house, served in the Soviet army and then worked as an art designer in an industrial design office.

After 1977, he focused entirely on his art, in particular in the fields of printed and drawn graphics. Aksinin's solo exhibitions were held in Tallinn, Estonia (1979, 1986), Lodz, Poland (1981, 1985), Warsaw (1984), Lviv (1987) and others. He also took part in various group exhibitions in the USSR and abroad.

== Death ==
On 3 May 1985, on his way back from Tallinn, Alexander Aksinin died in a plane crash near Zolochiv, close to Lviv.

== Art ==
A. Aksinin made 343 printed graphics including 3 unfinished works (mainly etching), about 200 unique drawn graphics in mixed techniques (gouache, India ink, color ink), as well as five oil paintings.

== Exhibitions ==
Aksinin regularly participated in the International Biennale of Small Graphics Forms in Łódź (Poland), where he was awarded Honorable Medals in 1979 and 1985.

In 2015 his etching series "Boschiana" was included in the permanent exposition of the Jheronimus Bosch Art Center in 's-Hertogenbosch in the Netherlands.

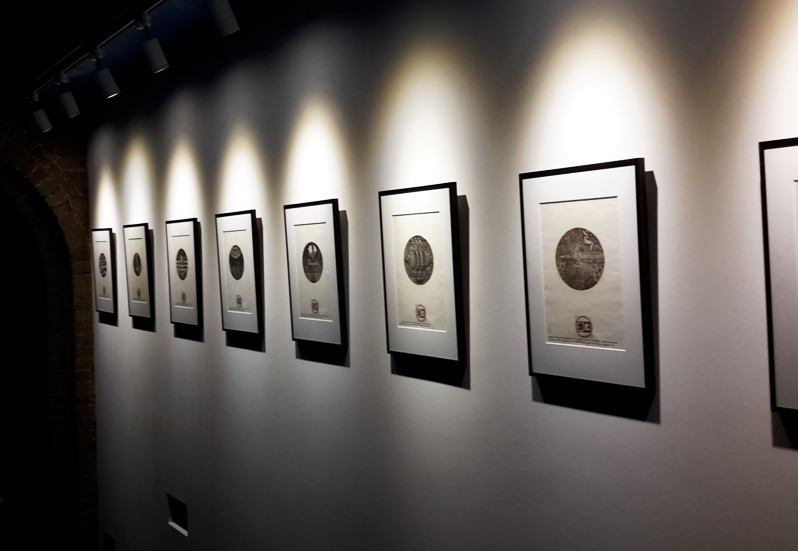
A.Aksinin's "Boschiana" in the Jheronimus Bosch Art Center

- 2017 Aksinin's Labyrinths. National Art Museum of Ukraine, Kyiv, Ukraine
- 2014 Alexander Aksinin. Methagraphics: The Insight Experience. Lviv National Art Gallery, Lviv, Ukraine
- 2013 Poetics of the Absurd, Gallery la Brique, Frankfurt, Germany
- 2012 Metagraphics: Alexander Aksinin. Gallery Pionova, Gdansk, Poland
- Aks-Art & Aks-Libris. Exlibris Gallery, Warsaw, Poland
- 2010 Aksinin. Excessus. Gallery Vata, Rostov-on-Don, Russia
- Alexander Aksinin. National Center for Contemporary Art, Moscow, Russia
- 2009 Alexander Aksinin: The Inner Experience. Art Gallery Primus, Lviv, Ukraine
- 2008 Aksinin: Eternal Books - Visual Images. Exhibition Hall of Don State Public Library, Rostov-on-Don, Russia
- 2008 Time-Space-Eternity. The State Museum of A.Pushkin, Moscow, Russia
- 2006 Alexander Aksinin. Day R. Museum of Contemporary Visual Art on Dmitrovskoy, Rostov-on-Don, Russia
- 2001 Alexander Aksinin's Etchings. Gallery Dzyga, Lviv, Ukraine
- 1992 Central House of Artists, Moscow, Russia
- 1991 Museum of Russian Art, Kiev, Ukraine
- 1988 66 Etchings of Alexander Aksinin from private collections. Gallery of Graphics and Drawings, Gdynia, Poland; Muzeum Zamkowe, Malbork, Poland
- 1987 Museum of Ukrainian Art, Lviv, Ukraine
- 1985 Gallery In Blanco, Łódź, Poland
- 1985 Art Saloon, Tallinn, Estonia
- 1984 Gallery of Contemporary Soviet Art, Warsaw, Poland
- 1981 January — Gallery Bałucka, Łódź, Poland
- 1979 Estonian State Art Institute, Tallinn, Estonia
