= Henry Hebbe =

Norwegian speed skater

Henry Hebbe (9 August 1915 – 27 May 1985) was a Norwegian speed skater. He was born in Tønsberg and represented the club Oslo SK. He competed at the 1948 Winter Olympics in St. Moritz.
