= Duncan Drummond =

Scottish cricketer and businessman (1923-1985)

Personal information
- Full name: Duncan Weir Drummond
- Born: 12 May 1923; Greenock, Renfrewshire, Scotland
- Died: 17 May 1985 (aged 62); Greenock, Renfrewshire, Scotland
- Batting: Right-handed
- Bowling: Right-arm medium

Domestic team information
- Years: Team
- 1951–1961: Scotland

Career statistics
Competition	First-class
Matches	17
Runs scored	263
Batting average	12.52
100s/50s	–/–
Top score	33
Balls bowled	1,908
Wickets	20
Bowling average	38.55
5 wickets in innings	–
10 wickets in match	–
Best bowling	4/73
Catches/stumpings	3/–
- Source: Cricinfo, 15 June 2022

Duncan Weir Drummond (12 May 1923 – 17 May 1985) was a Scottish first-class cricketer.

Drummond was born at Greenock in May 1923 and was educated at Merchiston Castle School. A club cricketer for Greenock Cricket Club, he made his debut in first-class cricket for Scotland against Worcestershire at Dundee in 1951. Drummond was a regular feature in the Scotland team of the 1950s, making fifteen first-class appearances from 1951 to 1957. He later made two final first-class appearances in 1961, against the Marylebone Cricket Club at Greenock, and Ireland at Cork. Playing as an all-rounder, he scored 263 runs at an average of 12.52, with a highest score of 33. With his right-arm medium pace bowling, he took 20 wickets at a bowling average of 38.55. His best figures of 4 for 73 came against Worcestershire in 1952. Outside of cricket, Drummound was a company director. He died at Greenock in May 1985.
