= Franz Josef Hirt =

Swiss pianist (1899–1985)

Franz Josef Hirt (7 February 1899 – 20 May 1985) was a Swiss classical pianist.

Born in Lucerne, Hirt studied with Hans Huber, Ernst Levy, Egon Petri and Alfred Cortot. From 1930 he led a concert education class at the Musikschule Konservatorium Bern. For his commitment to contemporary French music, the French government honoured him in 1927 with the Ordre des Palmes académiques, in 1948 with the title of Knight of the Legion of Honour and in 1957 with the title of Officer of the Legion of Honour. He was appointed to the Paris École Normale de Musique by Alfred Cortot.

Hirt died in Bern at the age of 86.
