= Henry Strasak =

- Born: Henry Jindrich Strasak; January 8, 1901; Rock Island, Illinois, United States
- Died: May 16, 1985 (aged 84)
- Employer(s): Central Intelligence Agency; United States Department of War; Federal Bureau of Investigation; United States Department of State
- Spouse: Francis (Franziska) Winkler
- Children: Sydney; Georgina
- Parent(s): Jan Strasak; Karoline, née Förster

Henry Jindrich Strasak (January 8, 1901 – May 16, 1985) was an American Federal Bureau of Investigation (FBI) and Central Intelligence Agency (CIA) officer.

== Early life ==
Henry Strasak was born in Rock Island, Illinois. He was a son of immigrants from the former Austria-Hungary of Czech and Austrian descent. After graduating from university, where he studied music and linguistics, he joined the United States Department of State. Strasak was stationed in Argentina and Chile and rose quickly in rank. However, in the mid-1930s, he was recruited by J. Edgar Hoover and joined the Federal Bureau of Investigation. His main responsibility was to gather intelligence on Fascist and Nazi sympathizers in the U.S. as well as to identify these networks abroad. Later Strasak was sent to occupied Europe where he worked closely with the Office of Strategic Services (the precursor to the CIA), which had helped to organize guerrilla fighting, sabotage and espionage during World War II. He gathered intelligence on German activities and plans in Austria and Protectorate Bohemia and Moravia, reporting directly to Allen Dulles, an OSS station chief in Bern, Switzerland.

== CIA career ==
After the war in Europe, Strasak resigned from the FBI and joined the War Department as an intelligence officer, working under Brigadier General John Magruder. Later he worked with the Central Intelligence Group (CIG) and together with Jackson, Correa and Souers, Strasak helped to lay the foundation for establishment of the CIA. Henry Strasak remained with the CIA for rest of his life, working in the Directorate for Plans and acting as an advisor to several CIA directors, including Dulles, McCone and Helms. However, very little is known about his career in the CIA and his later life. It is believed that Henry Strasak died on May 16, 1985.

== Notes ==
- In 1939, Strasak married Francis (Franziska) Winkler with whom he had two daughters.
- Strasak spoke fluently English, German, Czech, Russian, Spanish, Portuguese, Italian, Slovak and Polish.
