= Earl Keeley =

Canadian gridiron football player (born 1936)

No. 95, 97, 12
- Position: Quarterback

Personal information
- Born: May 15, 1936; Vancouver, British Columbia, Canada
- Died: May 9, 1985 (aged 48)
- Listed height: 6 ft 0 in (1.83 m)
- Listed weight: 180 lb (82 kg)

Career information
- High school: Kitsilano (Vancouver)
- College: Wenatchee Valley (1955–1956); Montana (1957)
- NFL draft: 1958: undrafted

Career history
- 1958–1962: BC Lions
- 1963: Montreal Alouettes

Career CFL statistics
- Passing comp: 33
- Passing att: 58
- Passing yards: 423
- Passing TDs: 3

Clarence "Earl" Keeley (May 15, 1936 – May 9, 1985) was a Canadian professional football quarterback who played six seasons in the Canadian Football League (CFL) with the BC Lions and Montreal Alouettes. He played college football at Wenatchee Valley College and the University of Montana.

== Early life ==
Clarence Keeley was born on May 15, 1936, in Vancouver, British Columbia. He attended Kitsilano High School in Vancouver. He played football, rugby, and basketball in high school. He then played junior football for the Vancouver Blue Bombers.

== College career ==
Keeley played college football at Wenatchee Valley College from 1955 to 1956. He earned all-conference honors in 1956.

Keeley then lettered for the Montana Grizzlies of the University of Montana during his junior year in 1957. He missed the first two games of the 1957 season due to bursitis. He completed 63 of 121 passes (52.1%) for 797 yards, six touchdowns, and eight interceptions that season while also rushing 19 times for 81 yards and one touchdown. On November 8, 1957, Keeley broke his collarbone in a game against Montana State. Montana was able to utilize a punt-run option during the 1957 season due to Keeley's unique ability to kick while on the run, a skill he picked up by playing rugby in high school. He majored in physical education while at Montana. He later graduated from Montana in spring 1962.

== Professional career ==
In June 1958, Keeley skipped his final year of college eligibility to sign with the BC Lions of the Canadian Football League (CFL). He played in two games for the Lions in 1958 but did not throw any passes. He played in all 16 games for the Lions in 1959, completing 16 of 26 passes (61.5%) for 232 yards, two touchdowns, and four interceptions. The Lions finished the year with a 9–7 record. Keeley played in 13 games during the 1960 season, totaling four completions on seven passing attempts (57.1%) for 60 yards and one interception while punting 35 times for 1,383 yards. The Lions finished the season with a 5–9–2 record. Keeley played in eight games in 1961, recording 11 completions on 21 attempts (52.4%) for 118 yards, one touchdown, and three interceptions, and nine punts for 334 yards. He played in 14 games in 1962, completing two of four passes for 13 yards while also punting four times for 148 yards. He was released on August 7, 1963, before the start of the 1963 CFL season after being beat out by Canadian quarterback Pete Ohler.

In August 1963, Keeley joined the Montreal Alouettes for a two-week trial. He played in one game for the Alouettes but did not record any statistics. He voluntarily left the team after the trial to return to his job at the Vancouver Jewish Community Centre as he was not able to find an appropriate job in Montreal.

== Personal life ==
Keeley was a smokejumper based out of the North Cascades Smokejumper Base in Washington in 1956. He was also the first-ever athletic director for the Vancouver Jewish Community Centre in 1957. Keeley was later the founding head coach of the Sherwood Park Rams football club in 1962. He died on May 9, 1985, at the age of 48.
