= Les Reynolds =

Australian rules footballer and field umpire

Personal information
- Full name: Leslie James Reynolds
- Born: 3 June 1899; North Melbourne, Victoria
- Died: 10 May 1985 (aged 85); Rosebud, Victoria
- Original team: Swimming Club

Playing career^{1}
Years	Club	Games (Goals)
1922–24	St Kilda	30 (11)
- ^{1} Playing statistics correct to the end of 1924.

Leslie James Reynolds (3 June 1899 – 10 May 1985) was an Australian rules footballer who played for St Kilda in the Victorian Football League (VFL) during the early 1920s.

A Swimming Club recruit, Reynolds was the uncle of Essendon champion Dick Reynolds. He officiated in three games as a field umpire in the 1929 VFL season, one of which was a loss to his former club St Kilda, resulting in their supporters surrounding the umpires rooms afterwards.
