= Les Willis (footballer) =

Australian rules footballer

Personal information
- Full name: Leslie Patrick Willis
- Born: 2 May 1922; Thornbury, Victoria
- Died: 27 May 1985 (aged 63)
- Original team: Fitzroy Reserves
- Height: 179 cm (5 ft 10 in)
- Weight: 92 kg (203 lb)

Playing career^{1}
Years	Club	Games (Goals)
1945–47	St Kilda	19 (2)
- ^{1} Playing statistics correct to the end of 1947.

Leslie Patrick Willis (2 May 1922 – 27 May 1985) was an Australian rules footballer who played with St Kilda in the Victorian Football League (VFL).
