= Rose May Davis =

American chemist

Rose May Davis (17 November 1894 – May 13, 1985) was an American chemist. In 1929 she became the first woman to be awarded a Ph.D. from Duke University.

== Early life and education ==
Rose May Davis was born on 17 November 1894 in Cumberland, Maryland, to Baptist Minister Quinton C. Davis and Sarah E. Davis. She studied a variety of subjects, such as music, law, and chemistry, and attended several institutions in pursuit of her education, including Chowan College (1912-1914), the Southern Conservatory of Music (1914-1916), Trinity College (1916), the University of Virginia (1920-1922), Duke University (from which she received a Master of Arts in 1927 and a Ph.D. in chemistry in 1929). During her time at Trinity College, Davis was a member of the Panhellenic Council, the Chanticleer Board, Athena Literary Society, Eko-L, and Zeta Tau Alpha. While at the University of Virginia, Davis studied law, and she became the fifth woman ever to pass the bar examination in Virginia, earning a grade of 100%. Davis is notable for being the first woman to obtain a Ph.D. from Duke University, which was awarded on June 5, 1929.

== Research ==
In 1926, Davis completed her master's thesis, The Reactivity of Doubly-Conjugated Ketones. Her doctoral dissertation, titled Investigation of Isoquinoline Alkaloids: Examination of Pictet's Berberine Synthesis, was completed in 1929. Outside of these two projects, Davis's research interests included synthesis of alkaloids, catalytic reduction of certain aromatic aldehydes, and dipole moments of certain organic compounds. In 1929, she was honored by her local chapter of Phi Beta Kappa for her distinguished achievements in the field of education.

== Career and later life ==
Davis had "the type of career mobility that was typical of women scientists" in the early 20th century. Prior to obtaining her Ph.D., Davis taught high school chemistry and practiced law for about a year with her brother in Virginia. She also taught chemistry at two small colleges. Upon graduating from Duke's doctoral program, she was appointed as an adjunct professor of chemistry at Randolph-Macon Woman's College, where she worked from 1929 to 1933. She then returned to Duke University as an instructor and research associate, remaining there until 1935. Finally, Davis decided to leave academia for good and accepted a legal position at E.I. du Pont de Nemours. Davis died on May 13, 1985, in South Boston, Halifax County, Virginia and was buried in her family plot at Forest Lawn Cemetery in Norfolk, Virginia.
