= Ben Gardner (basketball) =

American basketball player

Personal information
- Born: October 18, 1919 Houston, Texas
- Died: May 13, 1985 (aged 65) Walker County, Texas
- Listed height: 6 ft 3 in (1.91 m)
- Listed weight: 190 lb (86 kg)

Career information
- College: Sam Houston State (1939–1942, 1943–1944, 1945–1946)
- Position: Forward / center

Career history
- 1946: Fort Wayne Zollner Pistons
- 1946–1947: Anderson Duffey Packers
- 1947–1948: Houston Mavericks

Career highlights
- 4× All-Lone Star (1940–1942, 1946); Sam Houston State Hall of Fame (1975)

Benford Milo "Ben" Gardner (October 18, 1919 – May 13, 1985) was an American professional basketball player. He played for the Fort Wayne Zollner Pistons and Anderson Duffey Packers in the National Basketball League during the 1946–47 season and averaged 0.4 points per game.
