= George Faulkner (footballer) =

Australian rules footballer, born 1901

Personal information
- Full name: George Michael Faulkner
- Born: 4 February 1901
- Died: 25 May 1985 (aged 84)
- Original team: Railway Juniors / Ascot Vale

Playing career^{1}
Years	Club	Games (Goals)
1920–21	Essendon	15 (13)
- ^{1} Playing statistics correct to the end of 1921.

George Michael Faulkner (4 February 1901 – 25 May 1985) was an Australian rules footballer who played with Essendon in the Victorian Football League (VFL).
