= Herbert Ruff =

German-Canadian pianist and composer (1918–1985)

Herbert Ruff (September 16, 1918 – May 19, 1985) was a German-Canadian pianist and composer. He composed many chansons in French as well as a number of concert works.

== Early life ==
Ruff was born at Idaweiche, near Breslau, Germany (now Ligota-Panewniki, Poland). He began studying piano as a child in Vienna, and attended the Stern Conservatory in Berlin for two years.

== Career ==
From 1947 to 1952 Ruff taught in China at the Nanjing Conservatory, as well as performing on the piano in China. In 1952 Ruff moved to Canada and began work at the Canadian Broadcasting Corporation, composing and performing on the piano. In 1961 he performed with François D'Albert in New York and Chicago. In the 1960s he recorded and performed with folk-singer Pauline Julien, and composed many French chansons. He released an album, C'est une habitude, with Ovila Légaré.

Ruff died in 1985.
