= Rowland L. Collins =

Rowland L. Collins (1935 – 17 May 1985) was professor of English at the University of Rochester and an authority on Old English literature and the Victorian era. Collins was raised in Bristow, Oklahoma. He graduated from Princeton University in 1956 and received his Master's and PhD. degrees from Stanford University in 1959 and 1961.

Collins was a Woodrow Wilson Foundation fellow in 1956 and again in 1959. Before completing his doctoral thesis, he began teaching at Indiana University, where he remained until 1967. In 1965-66 he was a Guggenheim Foundation fellow. After five years at the University of Rochester he served as chair of its English department from 1972–81, a task he fulfilled “with unusual energy, political finesse, and generous thoughtfulness”.

While at Indiana University, Collins located a fragment of Ælfric's Grammar, which he subsequently was able to reconnect with another fragment in England, leading to a significant article with co-author Peter Clemoes titled "The Common Origin of Ælfric Fragments at New Haven, Oxford, Cambridge, and Bloomington”.

In the interim, Collins met philanthropist William Scheide, who owned the only complete Anglo-Saxon codex in North America, and who subsequently donated his large collection to Princeton University, including the Blickling Homilies, where it formed the core of the Scheide Library. As an active Episcopalian, a preacher concerned with theological questions, Collins was able to combine his personal enthusiasms with his intellectual talents in an edition of this important text. The manuscript, which was “close to completion at the time of his death, would have been more than a diplomatic text: Collins was planning to show how the Blickling text fit into a wider context as a preacher's book on its own terms”.

The Old English Newsletter notes Collins was “one of the founding editors of The Year's Work in Old English Studies (YWOES), ultimately became its sole editor, and never wavered in his devotion to it”. The YWOES is one of two annual publications of the Old English Newsletter “used by thousands of scholars worldwide”.

Together with his wife Sarah, a professor at Rochester Institute of Technology, and reflecting their shared interest in Victorian cemeteries, in 1980 Collins founded the Friends of Mt. Hope Cemetery in Rochester, NY, whose members provide guided tours and gardening services for America's first municipal Victorian cemetery, situated on nearly 200 acres of glacier-shaped hills and valleys.

== Selected publications ==
- Anglo-Saxon Vernacular Manuscripts in America. New York: Pierpont Morgan Lib., 1976.
- Fourteen British & American poets. Ed. Rowland Collins. Macmillan, 1964.
- Beowulf. Translated by Lucien Dean Pearson. Edited with an introduction, Rowland Collins. Bloomington: Indiana University Press. 1964.
- "Blickling Homily XVI and the Dating of Beowulf." Bald, Wolf-Dietrich (ed.) Weinstock, Host (ed.). Medieval Studies Conference Aachen 1983: Language and Literature. Frankfort: Peter Lang, 1984.
- "The Common Origin of Aelfric Fragments at New Haven, Oxford, Cambridge, and Bloomington." Burlin, Robert B., Irving, Edward B., Jr., Borroff, Marie. Old English Studies in Honour of John C. Pope. Toronto: University of Toronto, 1974.
- "Six Words in the Blickling Homilies." Rosier, James L. Philological Essays: Studies in Old and Middle English Language and Literature in Honour of Herbert Dean Meritt. The Hague: Mouton, 1970.
