= María Luisa Escobar =

Venezuelan musicologist and pianist (1903–1985)

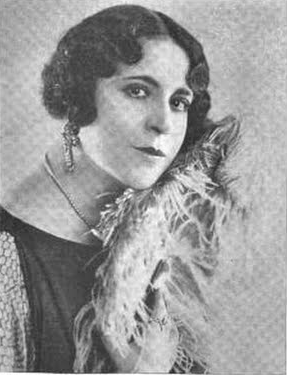
Maria Luisa Escobar, from a 1922 publication.

María Luisa González Gragirena de Escobar (née María Luisa González Gragirena; known artistically by her married name María Luisa Escobar; also credited as Maritza Graxirena; 5 December 1903 – 14 May 1985) was a Venezuelan musicologist, pianist, composer, and caricaturist. She founded the Caracas Athenaeum in 1931. She also served as president of the Venezuelan Red Cross (Valencia, 1921; Caracas, 1922–23).

== Early life and education ==
María Luisa González Gragirena was born in Valencia in 5 December 1903, the daughter of Henrique A. González and Maria Gragirena y Mijarez de González. At the age of five, she entered the Colegio de Lourdes where she began to study piano. A year later, she composed her first piece titled "Blanca, la niña Angélica" (Blanca, the girl Angélica). At the age of eight, she travelled with her parents to Curaçao, Netherlands Antilles, and entered the Welgelegen Habaai School where she studied French and English in addition to piano, violin, and musical composition, concluding with a Baccalaureate in 1917. Then, she moved to Paris to continue her studies of piano and composition in addition to singing under the tutelage of Jean Roger-Ducasse, Arthur Honegger and Charles Koechlin.

== Career ==
When she returned to Venezuela two years later she composed 16 pieces of musical theatre, a collaboration with poet Olga Capriles, and the musician and composer Juan Vicente Lecuna. In 1918 she married the German Federico Wolf and they moved to Puerto Cabello. They had three children, Waldemar, Irma, and Ivan Wolf González, but divorced afterward. She went on to marry the violinist and composer José Antonio Escobar Saluzzo (1877-1970) in Caracas. With this union, she had another son, Toney Escobar González. With Saluzzo, and the musician/composer Pedro Antonio Ríos Reyna, in addition to other artists, she initiated the instrumental vocal group "Quintet Ávila" of which she was a singer and arranger. On July 11, 1928 she recorded for Victor Talking Machine Company in a studio in Caracas her compositions "Alondras", "Mar adentro", "Tu maldad", and "Ángel de mis sueños". In these recordings, her name is credited as "Maritza Graxirena" in deference to her Catalan maternal surname.

In honor of her career as a researcher, musician, singer, and composer, as well as her fight in favor of authors and composers, María Luisa Escobar obtained the National Prize of Music in the year 1984, a few months before her death in Caracas on 14 May 1985.

== Awards ==
- Diploma of Honor, Second Salon, Venezuelan humorists (caricatures category, 1931)

== Selected works ==
- "Desesperanza"
- "Como la primera vez"
- "Vente con el alba"
- "Noches de luna de Altamira"
- "Naranjas de Valencia"
- "Contigo"
- "Orquídeas azules" con letra de Mercedes Carvajal de Arocha (Lucila Palacios)
- "Luna de Camoruco"
- "La despedida"
- "Caribe" tema de presentación de Radio Caracas (RCTV) durante mucho tiempo.
- "La luz de mi ciudad"
- "La Pajarera"
- "El marinero"
- "No puedo olvidarte"
- "Canción de oro"
- "Sueño de Bolívar"
- "Paraguaná"
- "Curiana"
- "Orinoco"
- "Canción del aviador"
- "Siete lunas"
- "Siempre"
- "Aleluya"
- "Carnaval de candela"
- "Concierto sentimental",
- "Vals de concierto"
- "Petit suite"
- "Mi general Bolívar"
- "Diez canciones sentimentales"
- "Maria Lionza"
