= Ron Mudge =

Australian rules footballer

Personal information
- Full name: Crofton Robert Mudge
- Born: 11 December 1920; Carlton, Victoria
- Died: 29 May 1985 (aged 64); Fitzroy, Victoria
- Original team: Mordialloc (FFL)
- Height: 179 cm (5 ft 10 in)
- Weight: 73 kg (161 lb)

Playing career^{1}
Years	Club	Games (Goals)
1940–42	St Kilda	11 (1)
- ^{1} Playing statistics correct to the end of 1942.

Crofton Robert Mudge (11 December 1920 – 29 May 1985) was an Australian rules footballer who played with St Kilda in the Victorian Football League (VFL).
