= B. Vijayalakshmi =

Indian physicist

- Born: 1952; India
- Died: 12 May 1985 (aged 32–33)
- Occupation: Physicist
- Spouse: T. Jayaram

B. Vijayalakshmi (1952 – 12 May 1985) was a physicist from India.

== Early life and education ==
Born into a conservative family, she obtained her master's degree from Seethalakshmi Ramaswami College, Tiruchirapalli in 1974 and joined the Department of Theoretical Physics. In 1982, she completed a PhD from Madras University, and soon met and married T. Jayaram.

== Career ==
B. Vijayalakshmi's studies explored the topics of relativistic equations of higher spin in external electromagnetic and gravitational fields, looking for ways higher spin theories could be constructed. Soon after she worked on spinning particles in non-relativistic quantum mechanics. It was around 1978 when the Association of Research Scholars of the Madras University was formed and was contributed to by B. Vijayalakshmi. In 1980, she gave talks at the biannual High Energy Physics Symposium of the Department of Atomic Energy held at the university in Kochi. She was treated with high regard after this and respect for her studies. Although her health deteriorated due to cancer she published five publications on the relativistic wave equations in external fields and completed her requirements for Ph.D., describing large classes of relativistic equations previously unknown to the scientific community. As supersymmetry became more popular her work shifted and she wrote two papers on the topic. For more than two more years B. was studying relativistic equations from different angles.

== Personal life ==
After meeting her husband and marrying in 1978, B. Vijayalakshmi slowly became more involved in communist leftist movements as time would allow, with her beliefs shifting into atheism. During her studies in quantum mechanics, she was diagnosed with widespread stomach and abdominal cancer, and eventually started using a wheelchair; however, she persisted with her work.

=== Death and legacy ===
B. Vijayalakshmi died on 12 May 1985.

Sashi Kumar created a documentary about her life called "Vijayalakshmi: The Story of a Young Woman with Cancer".
