= Harry Collins (magician) =

American Official corporate magician for the Frito-Lay company

- Born: April 27, 1920; Glasgow, Kentucky, U.S.
- Died: May 3, 1985 (aged 65)
- Resting place: Cave Hill Cemetery, Louisville, Kentucky, U.S.
- Occupation: Magician
- Employer: Frito-Lay
- Military career
- Allegiance: United States
- Service / branch: U.S. Marine Corps
- Battles / wars: World War II

Harry Collins (April 27, 1920 – May 3, 1985) was the official corporate magician for the Frito-Lay company from 1970 until his death. He was also a Marine during World War II. He promoted Frito-Lay products while doing magic tricks, and was known both as 'Mr. Magic' and as 'The Frito-Lay Magician'.

== Biography ==
Collins was born in Glasgow, Kentucky, to Paul Collins and Sadie Emerson. He had one older step-brother, three younger sisters, and one younger brother. At the age of fifteen, he became the head of the family after his father died. Working on their farm, planting tobacco and corn without the aid of mules or wagons, he provided for the family as he finished high school. He became interested in magic as a teenager after watching a local attorney, Edward Smith, perform magic tricks.

He died on May 3, 1985, at the age of 65; a life-size bronze statue of him stands on his grave in Cave Hill Cemetery in Louisville, Kentucky.
