= Jack Staulcup Orchestra =

The Jack Staulcup Orchestra was a Midwestern territory band that was operated out of Paducah, Kentucky by Jack Staulcup.

== Formation ==
The origins of the orchestra, began when Jack Staulcup,(November 7, 1907 – May 11, 1985), became a saxophonist/clarinetist during his teenage years in rural northwest Tennessee. After playing with various small Dixieland groups, Staulcup formed his own band in 1929. The music performed was in the big band genre popular in the 1920s-1940s timeframe. Besides playing the sax and clarinet, Staulcup often fronted the band with vocals. The size of the band, through the years varied from 9-12 members. This consisted of 3 saxes/clarinets, 2 trumpets, a trombone, piano, bass and drums. When additional members were carried, they were added to the sax or trumpet sections. The sound of the band, most closely resembled that of the more widely known Guy Lombardo and Jan Garber orchestras.

== 1929-1955 ==
The first performance of the orchestra, was on New Year's Eve, 1929. in the ballroom atop the then new Irvin Cobb Hotel in Paducah. Throughout the 1930s and until the early 1950s, the orchestra traveled over a much larger territory than it did in succeeding decades. This area ranged from Chicago to Birmingham, Alabama and from Texarkana, Texas to Myrtle Beach, South Carolina. Most of these locations were reached by extending out from Paducah in a series of one-night stands, involving lengthy and grueling road trips.

The initial success of the orchestra was the result of playing in nightclubs in smaller towns, where few of the name big bands ventured. It was an opportunity for fans to hear a live performance and dance to a big band, that was similar to the bands they heard on records and the radio.

Extended location bookings were also part of the orchestra. These were of 1–4 weeks in duration, and usually occurred in major cities, at noteworthy nightclubs and ballrooms. The Staulcup Orchestra would often be preceded or followed by famous bands, in the weeks before or after the booking.

== 1955-1973 ==
With the advent of Rock Music in the mid-1950s, Staulcup found business for the orchestra more limited. During this period, many big bands of the genre disbanded. Staulcup resolved to keep going, and reinvented his business model. He revised his territory, to that of a 150-mile radius of Paducah. A main focus venue in this region, was The Casa Loma Ballroom in St. Louis. The orchestra played the Casa-Loma regularly. Usually on three night, weekend stands. However, many of the nightclubs in the defined region had closed, or had switched exclusively to Rock or country music. Staulcup decided to concentrate on higher end private clubs. In the past he had relied on agents to book the band. Now he decided to book the band himself. In the process, he developed a good working relationship with many private club managers, that ensured a continuous flow of bookings. These were most often country clubs where the membership consisted of the upper crust of a given community. The members were resistant to the popular music of the day, and welcomed the Staulcup band's appearances.

Besides the private clubs, the orchestra also played many high school proms. The formality of a prom was a concern, and many school administrators of the era, were reluctant to allow Rock groups to perform at these events. Staulcup had a large library of music, mostly custom arrangements written specifically for the orchestra. The majority of the library consisted of jazz standards, with some contemporary Broadway show tunes added as their popularity demanded. As the 1960s progressed, this choice of music began to produce friction between Staulcup and the teenage prom crowds. At the urging of his teenage son, Staulcup began acquiring arrangements of popular, rock oriented songs. Mainly, the ballads of The Beatles, Burt Bacharach and Jimmy Webb. The extreme examples of this foray, were the additions of Three Dog Night's, Joy to The World, and Jim Croce's, Bad, Bad, LeRoy Brown. An album was recorded: Jack Stalucup and Orchestra, "Meanwhile Back On The Bandstand" BBS103, distributed and promoted by RCI Records (RCI Music Promotion) this helped to gain radio airplay on stations and areas not reached before..

The orchestra also benefited in later years by playing as the house band at The Purple Crackle Club near Cape Girardeau, Missouri. This was nearby to the home base of Paducah, and provided a relief from the extensive road travel.

In the early years Staulcup relied on full-time professional musicians. In later years the positions were filled with a mix of high school band teachers, and music students from both nearby Murray State University and Southeast Missouri State University. Many of these were musicians trained in the jazz idiom, who regularly spiced up the staid Staulcup arrangements.

Arguably, the 1960s was the most successful decade for the orchestra. Even though the genre of music, had largely fallen out of favor in popular culture. Key to this success, is that the band held a virtual monopoly on big band music between St. Louis and Nashville during this timeframe.

== 1973-1989 ==
In 1973, Staulcup achieved his dream of having his orchestra perform at the famed Roseland Ballroom in New York City for a several week engagement. Unfortunately, this was at a low point in both the ballroom's and New York City's history. Staulcup found the area around 52nd Street crime infested, and had his wallet stolen during his time there. On the returning plane trip, he suffered a heart attack. Upon landing in Paducah, he immediately was taken to a hospital, where he recuperated over several weeks. The band kept going during his absence. Staulcup returned to the band, but was limited to a few vocals, and mainly served as a front man who often mingled among his fans during the performance.

In May 1985, Jack Staulcup died at age 77, after a lengthy bout with pancreatic cancer. His widow, Ethel Staulcup, kept the band going for several years. The band was now fronted by Bill French, a long time sideman. Mrs. Staulcup had viewed the band as a source of supplementary income. However the hassles involved, and the decreasing number of bookings, made the venture more trouble than it was worth. Several issues were at play: The style of music had very little of a remaining market. Most of the musicians were now retired educators, with lucrative pensions, who viewed the band as nothing more than a weekend hobby. The dedication of French to conduct the business side of the operation was drawn into question. Another issue was the aged Dodge extended van, that served as the band bus. The van presented a potential civil liability to the Staulcup heirs if an accident would occur. Upon advice of her son, Mrs. Staulcup decided in 1989 to cease operation of The Jack Staulcup Orchestra.

== Legacy ==
The legacy of The Jack Staulcup Orchestra is that it operated continuously for 60 years, when many of its more famous contemporaries disbanded, or at least took a hiatus, at the end of the big band era. The orchestra provided big band dance music, to a region of the country, where live performances of the genre were otherwise unavailable.

== Recordings ==
The recordings of The Jack Staulcup Orchestra were completed in two timeframes. One is a session recorded in 1950 in Chicago on the Oriole Records label. The others span the 1960s through the 1970s and were recorded in Paducah under the New Century label, a small Paducah based studio. Staulcup marketed the albums himself, through mail order, and selling the records off the bandstand at performances. After his death, there was a stockpile of albums at the Staulcup home in Metropolis, IL. Mrs. Staulcup sold these albums occasionally when fans would request them. Upon her death in 1995, her son donated many of the albums to Paducah area nursing homes. What albums that remained, were destroyed in a household fire in 2002. Surviving albums can sometimes be found through various online retailers and auction sites.
