= 1946–47 Tri-Cities Blackhawks season =

NBL professional basketball team season

1946–47 Buffalo Bisons / Tri-Cities Blackhawks season
- Head coach: Nat Hickey
- Arena: Buffalo Memorial Auditorium (Buffalo Bisons); Wharton Field House (Tri-Cities Blackhawks)

Results
- Record: 19–25 (.432)
- Place: Division: 5th (Eastern)
- Playoff finish: Did not qualify
- Stats at Basketball Reference

The 1946–47 season was the only season under the Buffalo Bisons name, as well as the Tri-Cities Blackhawks' inaugural season in the National Basketball League (NBL). The inaugural season of the franchise was also the NBL's first official season where they actually implemented a drafting system similar to what the future rivaling Basketball Association of America (and later merging partner to become the National Basketball Association) had for the eventual NBA draft system a year later following the conclusion of their inaugural league season for the purpose of controlled player salaries and limiting the idea of outbidding other players outside of their own 12-player teams at hand (with the NBL having a budget of $6,000 this season), as well as implementing key players to signing binding contracts as soon as they could and the NBL looking to have full-time referees on display. The team originally began play as the Buffalo Bisons, based in Buffalo, New York, but moved during the middle of the season (after only 13 games played in 1946) to Moline, Illinois on Christmas Day, becoming the Tri-Cities Blackhawks (though the Blackhawks name wouldn't be considered official for them until January 1, 1947 due to their new "Name That Team" contest being multiple weeks long). Due to the sudden nature of their move from Buffalo to Moline, the Blackhawks (now known as the Atlanta Hawks) inherited the original 5–8 record of the Bisons, as well as their brief history of existence there.

In addition to debuting in the 1946–47 NBL season, the Tri-Cities Blackhawks also participated in the World Professional Basketball Tournament, which was an annual event that saw both independent teams and professional teams (primarily from the National Basketball League, but also includes a team from both the rivaling American Basketball League and the short-lived Pacific Coast Professional Basketball League. Despite them not being a playoff team when they entered this event, the Blackhawks would get their first win of the event by beating the ABL's champion team (and future Basketball Association of America/National Basketball Association team that they would meet from 1949 until 1954, with later years being met under the Milwaukee Hawks name instead of the Tri-Cities Blackhawks name) known as the Baltimore Bullets before losing in the semifinal round to the team that eventually would win the entire 1947 tournament in question, the Indianapolis Kautskys (a team who had earned a bye this year alongside the three-time defending champion Fort Wayne Zollner Pistons despite never actually winning a game in the WPBT before this year's event with the Blackhawks being their first ever victory there and despite not having the best record in their division that year, nor not even holding the actual MVP of the entire tournament in the process of it all). Despite the early exit from the event, Billy Hassett was named a member of the All-Tournament Second Team there.

== Draft picks ==
Entering this season, the National Basketball League would utilize their own draft system that would be considered similar to what the NFL has done for the NFL draft. As such, the 1946 NBL draft would be considered the first ever professional basketball draft ever done, even before the 1947 BAA draft that was done by the soon to be rivaling Basketball Association of America. Because of that fact, the Buffalo Bisons (as they were known to be called at that point in time) would participate in the inaugural 1946 NBL draft, which had occurred sometime during the 1946–47 season's offseason period before that season officially began for the NBL. However, as of 2026, no records of what the Bisons' draft picks might have been for the NBL have properly come up (assuming Buffalo would have even been ready for entry by the time the 1946 NBL draft began), with any information on who those selections might have been for the Bisons (especially since the Buffalo Bisons later turned into the Tri-Cities Blackhawks franchise would be considered an expansion franchise for the NBL this season) most likely being lost to time in the process.

== Roster ==
1946–47 Buffalo Bisons / Tri-Cities Blackhawks roster
Players

Pos.	No.	Player	Height	Weight	DOB	From
F/C	–	Paul Anthony	6 ft 5 in (1.96 m)	195 lb (88 kg)	1924-01-23	Washington & Jefferson
G/F	–	Pop Gates	6 ft 2 in (1.88 m)	205 lb (93 kg)	1917-08-30	Franklin HS (NY)
G	–	Bob Gauchat	6 ft 0 in (1.83 m)	180 lb (82 kg)	1921-03-05	Canisius
G/F	–	Al Grenert	6 ft 0 in (1.83 m)	190 lb (86 kg)	1919-07-08	NYU
F/C	–	Nick Grunzweig	6 ft 5 in (1.96 m)	215 lb (98 kg)	1918-07-21	Niagara
G	–	Billy Hassett	5 ft 11 in (1.80 m)	185 lb (84 kg)	1921-10-21	Notre Dame
G/F	–	Nat Hickey	5 ft 11 in (1.80 m)	180 lb (82 kg)	1902-01-30	Hoboken HS (NJ)
F/C	–	Ed Lewinski	6 ft 4 in (1.93 m)	210 lb (95 kg)	1918-09-10	Bowen HS (IL)
G	–	Ed Moeller	6 ft 0 in (1.83 m)	175 lb (79 kg)	1919-01-08	Ohio State
C	–	Don Otten	6 ft 10 in (2.08 m)	240 lb (109 kg)	1921-04-18	Bowling Green
G/F	–	Howie Rader	6 ft 1 in (1.85 m)	190 lb (86 kg)	1921-03-29	Long Island
G/F	–	Len Rader	6 ft 1 in (1.85 m)	185 lb (84 kg)	1921-03-29	Long Island
G/F	–	Pat Rooney	6 ft 3 in (1.91 m)	190 lb (86 kg)	1925	Erasmus Hall HS (NY)
G/F	–	Wilbur Schu	6 ft 3 in (1.91 m)	190 lb (86 kg)	1922-12-18	Kentucky
G	–	Vic Siegel	5 ft 10 in (1.78 m)	160 lb (73 kg)	1920-08-24	Iowa
F/C	–	Bob Sims	6 ft 6 in (1.98 m)	220 lb (100 kg)	1915-07-03	Western Michigan
G	–	Dick Starzyk	5 ft 10 in (1.78 m)	180 lb (82 kg)	1921-03-21	Marquette
G	–	Mel Thurston	6 ft 0 in (1.83 m)	175 lb (79 kg)	1919-01-16	Canisius
G	–	Stan Waxman	5 ft 11 in (1.80 m)	180 lb (82 kg)	1922-05-20	Long Island

Coaches
Head coach
- Nat Hickey

Legend
- (DP) Unsigned draft pick
- (FA) Free agent
- (S) Suspended
- Injured

Roster

For the players that were on this roster, only Bob Sims and Dick Starzyk would end up playing for the team during their thirteen games under their original Buffalo Bisons name (while there were also two other players named Bob Daughtery from Virginia Union University (a second African American player) and presumably Mark Marlaire from the University of Illinois that were once a part of the Buffalo Bisons' roster properly, they ultimately failed to play a single proper NBL scheduled game before being waived from the team themselves), while Don Otten, African-American star player Pop Gates, Nick Grunzweig, Billy Hassett, elderly player-coach Nat Hickey, twin brothers Len Rader and Howie Rader, and Stan Waxman played for both the Buffalo Bisons and the Tri-Cities Blackhawks throughout this season, and Paul Anthony, Bob Gauchat, Al Grenert, Ed Lewinski, Ed Moeller, Pat Rooney, Wilbur Schu, Vic Siegel, and Mel Thurston were the only players to play for the team while they were known as the Tri-Cities Blackhawks for the rest of this season.

== Regular season ==
The Buffalo Bisons won its first game 50–39 over the Syracuse Nationals on November 8, 1946. The team's last Buffalo appearance was a 50–38 loss to the Sheboygan Red Skins on December 16. The Bisons left town for a December road trip with their future in doubt; the team struggled to draw crowds in Buffalo, and two of their scheduled home games were canceled. On December 25, it was announced that the franchise was moving to Moline, where they finished the season as the Tri-Cities Blackhawks. The Blackhawks missed the postseason with a 19–25 record (5–8 in Buffalo and 14–17 in Moline). The inaugural season they had with the combined losing records of the Bisons and Blackhawks together would still leave the franchise two games shy of a playoff spot over both the Syracuse Nationals and Toledo Jeeps.

=== Eastern Division standings ===
Pos.	Eastern Division	Wins	Losses	Win %
1	Rochester Royals	31	13	.705
2	Fort Wayne Zollner Pistons	25	19	.568
T–3	Syracuse Nationals	21	23	.477
T–3	Toledo Jeeps	21	23	.477
5	Buffalo Bisons / Tri-Cities Blackhawks‡	19	25	.432
6	Youngstown Bears	12	32	.273
^{‡} Buffalo relocated primarily into the state of Illinois during the season and assumed Buffalo's team history and record in the standings. Buffalo's record was 5–8, while the Tri-Cities' record was 14–17.

=== Buffalo Bisons Schedule ===
An official database created by John Grasso detailing every NBL match possible (outside of two matches that the Kankakee Gallagher Trojans won over the Dayton Metropolitans in 1938) would be released in 2026 showcasing every team's official schedules throughout their time spent in the NBL. As such, these are the official results recorded for the newer Buffalo Bisons NBL team in their only season in the NBL before moving to Moline, Illinois for the rest of this season, as well as the known cancelled home games they had originally scheduled for their period of time before the initial move.

#	Date	Opponent	Score	Record
1	November 10	Syracuse	50–39	1–0
2	November 16	Toledo	39–50	1–1
3	November 21	@ Syracuse	45–43	2–1
4	November 23	Detroit	45–35	3–1
5	November 26	@ Rochester	57–78	3–2
6	December 5	Rochester	44–54	3–3
7	December 6	@ Youngstown	41–50	3–4
8	December 8	@ Fort Wayne	41–62	3–5
9	December 9	N Oshkosh	57–67	3–6
10	December 11	Anderson	52–50 (OT)	4–6
11	December 16	Sheboygan	38–50	4–7
12	December 19	@ Anderson	46–61	4–8
13	December 23	@ Toledo	43–39	5–8
—	December 25	Chicago	Cancelled	
—	December 30	Indianapolis	Cancelled	
—	January 6	Detroit	Cancelled	
—	January 8	Syracuse	Cancelled	
—	January 13	Oshkosh	Cancelled	
—	January 16	Youngstown	Cancelled	
—	January 20	Fort Wayne	Cancelled	
—	February 3	Indianapolis	Cancelled	
—	February 6	Fort Wayne	Cancelled	
—	February 12	Oshkosh	Cancelled	
—	February 17	Rochester	Cancelled	
—	February 20	Toledo	Cancelled	
—	February 24	Chicago	Cancelled	
—	March 3	Sheboygan	Cancelled	
—	March 6	Anderson	Cancelled	
—	March 10	Youngstown	Cancelled	

It's unknown if the road games that were originally scheduled for the Buffalo Bisons were still played while the team was going under the new Tri-Cities Blackhawks name or if they were also cancelled (outside of a couple of somewhat unrelated matches that the Syracuse Nationals had at their home venue against both the Anderson Duffey Packers and the Indianapolis Kautskys), with the NBL doing some last-minute schedule tweaking for the entire league in order to accommodate for the sudden change the new Buffalo Bisons team made in moving to Moline, Illinois to become the Tri-Cities Blackhawks for the rest of the season.

=== Tri-Cities Blackhawks Schedule ===
An official database created by John Grasso detailing every NBL match possible (outside of two matches that the Kankakee Gallagher Trojans won over the Dayton Metropolitans in 1938) would be released in 2026 showcasing every team's official schedules throughout their time spent in the NBL. As such, these are the official results recorded for the Tri-Cities Blackhawks in their first season in the NBL following the new Buffalo Bisons team moving from Buffalo, New York to Moline, Illinois near the end of 1946, with the Blackhawks officially playing their games at the start of 1947. Please note that the games above this section still count as games that were won or lost by the Tri-Cities Blackhawks before this point in the season, retroactively speaking.

#	Date	Opponent	Score	Record
14 (1)	January 3	Fort Wayne	47–52	5–9 (0–1)
15 (2)	January 7	Youngstown	41–49	5–10 (0–2)
16 (3)	January 9	@ Detroit	57–42	6–10 (1–2)
17 (4)	January 11	Chicago	48–43	7–10 (2–2)
18 (5)	January 14	@ Indianapolis	57–70	7–11 (2–3)
19 (6)	January 15	Detroit	47–39	8–11 (3–3)
20 (7)	January 17	@ Chicago	30–53	8–12 (3–4)
21 (8)	January 20	Anderson	56–58	8–13 (3–5)
22 (9)	January 21	Anderson	45–67	8–14 (3–6)
23 (10)	January 26	Sheboygan	47–52	8–15 (3–7)
24 (11)	January 27	@ Toledo	61–63	8–16 (3–8)
25 (12)	January 28	Syracuse	41–46	8–17 (3–9)
26 (13)	January 30	@ Youngstown	56–43	9–17 (4–9)
27 (14)	February 5	Chicago	57–61 (OT)	9–18 (4–10)
28 (15)	February 9	@ Fort Wayne	45–56	9–19 (4–11)
29 (16)	February 11	Oshkosh	53–47	10–19 (5–11)
30 (17)	February 12	Sheboygan	54–48	11–19 (6–11)
31 (18)	February 14	@ Indianapolis	55–52	12–19 (7–11)
32 (19)	February 15	Indianapolis	43–40	13–19 (8–11)
33 (20)	February 17	Rochester	60–50	14–19 (9–11)
34 (21)	February 20	Toledo	64–52	15–19 (10–11)
35 (22)	February 23	@ Rochester	48–41	16–19 (11–11)
36 (23)	February 24	@ Syracuse	47–53	16–20 (11–12)
37 (24)	February 26	@ Detroit	51–43	17–20 (12–12)
38 (25)	February 27	Youngstown	47–39	19–20 (13–12)
39 (26)	March 3	Oshkosh	41–46	19–22 (13–13)
40 (27)	March 6	Indianapolis	72–55	20–22 (14–13)
41 (28)	March 7	@ Chicago	52–72	20–23 (14–14)
42 (29)	March 8	@ Oshkosh	40–54	20–24 (14–15)
43 (30)	March 9	Sheboygan	50–60	20–25 (14–16)
44 (31)	March 15	Fort Wayne	50–55	20–26 (14–17)

Interestingly, two home games that were cancelled due to the Buffalo Bisons moving to Moline, Illinois to become the Tri-Cities Blackhawks ended up getting rescheduled to their original planned game dates for the Tri-Cities Blackhawks to play at home instead, with the Blackhawks being at home on February 17 against the Rochester Royals and on February 20 against the Toledo Jeeps. With that being said, the Blackhawks would still not qualify for the NBL Playoffs in their inaugural season of play despite moving from Buffalo to Moline and rebranding themselves in their debut season of play.

== Awards and records ==
- Don Otten – NBL All-Rookie Team
- Pop Gates – NBL All-Time Team

== World Professional Basketball Tournament ==
For the first time in franchise history, the Tri-Cities Blackhawks (only months after moving from Buffalo to Moline and rebranding themselves from the Buffalo Bisons) would participate in the World Professional Basketball Tournament in Chicago, which saw the 1947 event being held on April 7–11, 1947 and consisted of 14 teams, most of which was an even mixture of independently ran teams and teams from the National Basketball League alongside the rivaling American Basketball League's defending champion Baltimore Bullets and the Portland Indians from the ultimately short-lived Pacific Coast Professional Basketball League. In the first round, the Blackhawks saw themselves go up against the American Basketball League's defending champions (and future Basketball Association of America/National Basketball Association team) in the Baltimore Bullets. Despite them feeling like they'd be outmatched and overwhelmed by Baltimore's status as a team (especially considering they had finished their season with a 31–3 record), the Blackhawks would end up upsetting the ABL's defending champions with a 57–46 victory in their first ever WPBT game played thanks to the play of Billy Hassett in particular. While this was their first match the two teams would play against each other under such circumstances, they would meet with each other many times afterward years later in the NBA from 1949 until 1954 (which ironically happened due to the Bullets' early defeat in the WPBT that year since they wanted to compete in that year's event, but felt that the ABL was taking too long with setting up their championship series, and by the time the championship series was set to begin for the ABL, the ABL had already considered the Baltimore Bullets forfeited losers of the 1947 ABL championship to the Trenton Tigers (though the Bullets would dispute that and later claim they were the true champions of the ABL that season instead), which later led to the Bullets defecting from the ABL to the newly created BAA in protest of the ABL's results there), though in later years, the Blackhawks would change their names to the Milwaukee Hawks instead.

For the quarterfinal round, the Blackhawks saw themselves go up against the Indianapolis Kautskys, who had oddly earned themselves a bye despite not being considered the best team in the Western Division this year nor having prestige in the WPBT like the Fort Wayne Zollner Pistons (to the point where the Kautskys had never won a single game in the WPBT up until this point in time). Despite Billy Hassett and the Blackhawks appearing to have the upper hand following their upset victory over the ABL's Bullets in the first round, the Kautskys would end up finally getting their first victory in WPBT history with the Blackhawks losing 65–56 thanks to the leadership and effort of All-Tournament First Team members Leo Klier, Arnie Risen, and Herm Schaefer eliminating the Tri-Cities franchise from the tournament. This victory by the Kautskys later led to them winning the entire event by beating the Oshkosh All-Stars in the semifinal round and the Toledo Jeeps in the championship round (though Julie Rivlin of the Jeeps won the tournament's MVP award this time around), though Billy Hassett was later named a member of the All-Tournament Second Team.

=== Games Played ===
- Won first round (57–46) over the Baltimore Bullets
- Lost quarterfinal round (56–65) to the Indianapolis Kautskys

=== Awards and honors ===
- Billy Hassett, All-Tournament Second Team
