= 1946–47 Youngstown Bears season =

NBL professional basketball team season

- Head coach: Frank Shannon (player-coach)
- Arena: Youngstown South Field House

Results
- Record: 12–32 (.273)
- Place: Division: 6th (Eastern)
- Playoff finish: Did not qualify

The 1946–47 Youngstown Bears season was technically the second and final professional basketball season of play for the Youngstown Bears in the smaller city of Youngstown, Ohio under the National Basketball League, which officially was the tenth season that it existed as a professional basketball league after previously existing as a semi-pro or amateur basketball league called the Midwest Basketball Conference in its first two seasons back in 1935. However, according to some older material that covered the NBL's history, the Youngstown Bears franchise are considered to be an extension of the Pittsburgh Raiders franchise, which originally started out as the independently created Pittsburgh Y.M.H.A. team back when they were an amateur team from the Pittsburgh Young Men's Hebrew Association all the way back in 1931 before joining the Midwest Basketball Conference precursor in 1935 before the team rebranded themselves into the Pittsburgh Pirates NBL team honoring the Major League Baseball team of the same name that joined the rebranded NBL in 1937 before they first left it in 1939 before supposedly reforming themselves independently as the Raiders in 1943 before returning to the NBL in 1944 before having the Youngstown Bears team replace the Pittsburgh Raiders team due to local fans in Youngstown looking to have the Raiders play in Youngstown instead (though the Raiders would still later exist as an independent team instead). As such, if one were to include the wild Pittsburgh Y.M.H.A./Pirates/Raiders team history as a part of the Youngstown Bears' newly established history, this would officially be (at least) their eleventh and final season of play as a franchise instead of their second and final season of play as a franchise.

Throughout their second and final season in Youngstown, the Bears would continue to see significant struggles and issues that related from the previous season they dealt with (including the tragic passing of young rising star center Huck Hartman to pneumonia from the end of the previous season on March 25, 1946) plague their entire season. While they did see themselves competing for one of the playoff spots in the Eastern Division at one point under new player-coach Frank Shannon (despite being in last place at the time with a 9–21 record by the end of January 1947 and start of February 1947), the Bears would finish their season with only three more wins afterward for the rest of the way throughout this season to finish with a worse 12–32 record for a last place finish in the Eastern Division, with only the Detroit Gems (who later became the Minneapolis Lakers (now known as the Los Angeles Lakers)) having a worse record than them with a 4–40 record. Following this season's conclusion, the Youngstown Bears would join the eventual NBL champion Chicago American Gears as one of two NBL teams to leave the league this season, with Youngstown's departure being more related to financial issues at hand.

== Draft picks ==
Entering this season, the National Basketball League would utilize their own draft system that would be considered similar to what the NFL has done for the NFL draft. As such, the 1946 NBL draft would be considered the first ever professional basketball draft ever done, even before the 1947 BAA draft that was done by the soon to be rivaling Basketball Association of America. Because of that fact, the Youngstown Bears would participate in the inaugural 1946 NBL draft, which had occurred sometime during the 1946–47 season's offseason period before that season officially began for the NBL. However, as of 2026, no records of what the Bears' draft picks might have been for the NBL have properly come up, with any information on who those selections might have been for Youngstown likely being lost to time in the process.

== Roster ==
Please note that due to the way records for professional basketball leagues like the NBL and the ABL were recorded at the time, some information on both teams and players may be harder to list out than usual here.

1946–47 Youngstown Bears roster
Players

Pos.	No.	Player	Height	Weight	DOB	From
G		John Bosak	6 ft 3 in (1.91 m)	185 lb (84 kg)	1922–09–09	Farrell HS (PA)
F/C		Irv Brenner	6 ft 4 in (1.93 m)	200 lb (91 kg)	1913–05–31	Duquesne
G/F		Charlie Butler	6 ft 2 in (1.88 m)	165 lb (75 kg)	1920–08–15	Notre Dame
F/C		Bill Farrow	6 ft 4 in (1.93 m)	200 lb (91 kg)	1918–06–15	Kentucky State
G		Paul Herman	6 ft 1 in (1.85 m)	175 lb (79 kg)	1921–07–05	Tennessee
G/F		Charlie Joachim	6 ft 2 in (1.88 m)	184 lb (83 kg)	1920–07–21	Mount Union
G/F		Bob Kramer	6 ft 3 in (1.91 m)	185 lb (84 kg)	1922–04–23	Hammond Tech HS (IN)
F/C		Bernie Mehen	6 ft 4 in (1.93 m)	185 lb (84 kg)	1918–09–19	Tennessee
G		Red Mihalik	6 ft 0 in (1.83 m)	180 lb (82 kg)	1916–09–22	Ford City HS (PA)
F/C		Jack Mills	6 ft 4 in (1.93 m)	210 lb (95 kg)	1918–05–08	Mount Union
G		Ed Moeller	6 ft 0 in (1.83 m)	175 lb (79 kg)	1919–01–08	Ohio State
C		Bill Sattler	6 ft 8 in (2.03 m)	195 lb (88 kg)	1916–08–09	Ohio State
G/F		Wilbur Schu	6 ft 3 in (1.91 m)	190 lb (86 kg)	1922–12–18	Kentucky
G		Frank Shannon	5 ft 11 in (1.80 m)	180 lb (82 kg)	1917–11–25	Wittenberg
G/F		Emil Sotnyk	5 ft 11 in (1.80 m)	170 lb (77 kg)	1921–08–21	VMI
G/F		Milt Ticco	6 ft 3 in (1.91 m)	190 lb (86 kg)	1922–09–22	Kentucky

Coaches
Head coach
- Frank Shannon

Legend
- (DP) Unsigned draft pick
- (FA) Free agent
- (S) Suspended
- Injured

Roster

== Regular season ==
=== Season standings ===
Pos.	Eastern Division	Wins	Losses	Win %
1	Rochester Royals	31	13	.705
2	Fort Wayne Zollner Pistons	25	19	.568
T–3	Syracuse Nationals	21	23	.477
T–3	Toledo Jeeps	21	23	.477
5	Buffalo Bisons / Tri-Cities Blackhawks‡	19	25	.432
6	Youngstown Bears	12	32	.273
^{‡} Buffalo relocated primarily into the state of Illinois during the season and assumed Buffalo's team history and record in the standings. Buffalo's record was 5–8, while the Tri-Cities' record was 14–17.

=== NBL Schedule ===
Not to be confused with exhibition or other non-NBL scheduled games that did not count towards Youngstown's official NBL record for this season. An official database created by John Grasso detailing every NBL match possible (outside of two matches that the Kankakee Gallagher Trojans won over the Dayton Metropolitans in 1938) would be released in 2026 showcasing every team's official schedules throughout their time spent in the NBL. As such, these are the official results recorded for the Youngstown Bears during their second and final season in the NBL.

#	Date	Opponent	Score	Record
1	November 11	Rochester	43–69	0–1
2	November 14	@ Syracuse	64–67	0–2
3	November 17	@ Fort Wayne	53–61	0–3
4	November 18	@ Anderson	58–66	0–4
5	November 19	@ Indianapolis	64–71	0–5
6	November 22	Detroit	62–54	1–5
7	November 23	@ Rochester	45–57	1–6
8	November 27	Toledo	53–69	1–7
9	December 2	Syracuse	36–47	1–8
10	December 3	@ Detroit	54–57	1–9
11	December 6	Buffalo	50–41	2–9
12	December 10	Chicago	60–72	2–10
13	December 21	Indianapolis	66–64 (OT)	3–10
14	December 23	Sheboygan	67–48	4–10
15	December 25	@ Detroit	75–74 (OT) [73–74 (OT)†]	5–10 [4–11†]
16	December 26	Syracuse	58–53	6–10 [5–11†]
17	December 30	Fort Wayne	54–57	6–11 [5–12†]
18	January 2	Oshkosh	54–48 (OT)	7–11 [6–12†]
19	January 5	@ Chicago	45–55	7–12 [6–13†]
20	January 7	@ Tri-Cities	49–41	8–12
21	January 8	@ Toledo	62–73	8–13
22	January 9	Indianapolis	50–54	8–14
23	January 11	@ Oshkosh	55–62	8–15
24	January 12	@ Sheboygan	26–56	8–16
25	January 13	Anderson	56–63	8–17
—	January 16	@ Buffalo	Cancelled	
26	January 18	@ Rochester	53–67	8–18
27	January 23	Toledo	51–45	9–18
28	January 26	@ Fort Wayne	40–68	9–19
29	January 27	Rochester	61–68 (OT)	9–20
30	January 30	Tri-Cities	43–56	9–21
31	February 3	Detroit	62–52	10–21
32	February 6	Anderson	78–59	11–21
33	February 10	Chicago	52–64	11–22
34	February 13	Oshkosh	50–54	11–23
35	February 17	Fort Wayne	72–63	12–23
36	February 19	@ Toledo	54–67	12–24
37	February 20	@ Syracuse	44–80	12–25
38	February 27	@ Tri-Cities	39–47	12–26
39	March 1	@ Oshkosh	55–71	12–27
40	March 2	N Chicago	52–65	12–28
41	March 3	@ Anderson	47–63	12–29
42	March 4	@ Indianapolis	48–71	12–30
43	March 6	@ Sheboygan	49–59	12–31
—	March 10	@ Buffalo	Cancelled	
44	March 11	Sheboygan	44–45	12–32

† – Game was originally recorded as a 74–73 overtime victory for the Detroit Gems, but a faulty time clock in the overtime period near the end of the game when Youngstown looked to make an extra, final shot in their game caused the Bears to protest the initial results to NBL Commissioner Ward Lambert. While the game was still recorded as a Gems victory and a Bears defeat for at least one more scheduled NBL game the Gems played in and four more NBL games that Youngstown themselves played, the results of the December 25, 1946 game ended with the commissioner accepting Youngstown's grievances and led to the Bears getting a 75–74 overtime victory that day instead.
