= 1946–47 Rochester Royals season =

NBL professional basketball team season

- Division champions
- Head coach: Les Harrison & Eddie Malanowicz
- Owners: Jack Harrison; Les Harrison
- Arena: Edgerton Park Arena

Results
- Record: 31–13 (.705)
- Place: Division: 1st (Eastern)
- Playoff finish: Lost NBL Championship (1–3) to the Chicago American Gears
- Stats at Basketball Reference
- Radio: WHAM

The 1946–47 Rochester Royals season was the franchise's second season in the National Basketball League (NBL). This also was the NBL's first official season where they actually implemented a drafting system similar to what the future rivaling Basketball Association of America (and later merging partner to become the National Basketball Association) had for the eventual NBA draft system a year later following the conclusion of their inaugural league season for the purpose of controlled player salaries and limiting the idea of outbidding other players outside of their own 12-player teams at hand (with the NBL having a budget of $6,000 this season), as well as implementing key players to signing binding contracts as soon as they could and the NBL looking to have full-time referees on display. The Royals finished this season with the best record in the NBL at 31–13, as well as beat the Syracuse Nationals 3–1 in the Eastern Division opening (quarterfinal) round and the Fort Wayne Zollner Pistons 2–1 in the Eastern Division semifinal round. However, despite their best efforts, they could not repeat as champions of the NBL this season due to opposing center George Mikan proving to be too much for the Royals to overcome in a championship series, which resulted in Rochester losing the NBL championship 3–1 to the Chicago American Gears, who would end up leaving the NBL at the end of this season to start a new league that ultimately proved to be short-lived in its own nature, the Professional Basketball League of America. One reason for the Chicago American Gears ultimately defecting from the NBL was due to their league commissioner at the time, Ward Lambert, considering the American Gears to only be the champions of the NBL Playoffs that season instead of the overall champions of the league since he inexplicably considered the Royals (who held the best overall record this season) to be the official league champions this season, with Lambert staying under that position for one more season before resigning under league pressure for Doxie Moore during its final season of existence.

== Draft picks ==
Entering this season, the National Basketball League would utilize their own draft system that would be considered similar to what the NFL has done for the NFL draft. As such, the 1946 NBL draft would be considered the first ever professional basketball draft ever done, even before the 1947 BAA draft that was done by the soon to be rivaling Basketball Association of America. Because of that fact, the Rochester Royals would participate in the inaugural 1946 NBL draft, which had occurred sometime during the 1946–47 season's offseason period before that season officially began for the NBL. However, as of 2026, no records of what the Royals' draft picks might have been for the NBL have properly come up, with any information on who those selections might have been for Rochester being lost to time in the process.

== Roster ==
1946–47 Rochester Royals roster
Players

Pos.	No.	Player	Height	Weight	DOB	From
F	7	Frank Beaty	6 ft 2 in (1.88 m)	205 lb (93 kg)	1919-05-23	Rochester Tech
G/F	15	Al Cervi	5 ft 11 in (1.80 m)	170 lb (77 kg)	1917-02-12	East HS (NY)
G		Jim Cominsky	6 ft 2 in (1.88 m)	185 lb (84 kg)	1918-07-28	DePaul
F/C	10	Bill Coven	6 ft 7 in (2.01 m)	220 lb (100 kg)	1920-02-16	Baldwin Wallace
G/F	11	Bob Davies	6 ft 1 in (1.85 m)	175 lb (79 kg)	1920-01-15	Seton Hall
G		Jack Garfinkel	6 ft 0 in (1.83 m)	190 lb (86 kg)	1918-06-13	St. John's
G	8	Leon Gauchat	6 ft 0 in (1.83 m)	180 lb (82 kg)	1921-03-05	Canisius
F/C	20	George Glamack	6 ft 6 in (1.98 m)	225 lb (102 kg)	1919-06-07	North Carolina
G	16	Red Holzman	5 ft 10 in (1.78 m)	175 lb (79 kg)	1920-08-10	CCNY
F/C	17	Arnie Johnson	6 ft 5 in (1.96 m)	236 lb (107 kg)	1920-05-17	Bemidji State
F/C	12	Wilbert King	6 ft 4 in (1.93 m)	217 lb (98 kg)	1916-11-15	LIU
G/F	13	Andrew Levane	6 ft 2 in (1.88 m)	190 lb (86 kg)	1920-04-11	St. John's
F/C	9	Al Negratti	6 ft 3 in (1.91 m)	200 lb (91 kg)	1921-06-12	Seton Hall
F		Jim Quinlan	6 ft 4 in (1.93 m)	205 lb (93 kg)	1922-05-29	Canisius

Coaches
Head coach

Eddie Malanowicz &
Les Harrison

Legend
- (DP) Unsigned draft pick
- (FA) Free agent
- (S) Suspended
- Injured

Roster

Note: Jim Cominsky, Jack Garfinkel, Arnie Johnson, and Jim Quinlan were not a part of the playoff roster this season for one reason or another.

== Season standings ==
=== NBL Schedule ===
Not to be confused with exhibition or other non-NBL scheduled games that did not count towards Rochester's official NBL record for this season. An official database created by John Grasso detailing every NBL match possible (outside of two matches that the Kankakee Gallagher Trojans won over the Dayton Metropolitans in 1938) would be released in 2026 showcasing every team's official schedules throughout their time spent in the NBL. As such, these are the official results recorded for the Rochester Royals during their second season in the NBL.

#	Date	Opponent	Score	Record
1	November 11	@ Youngstown	69–43	1–0
2	November 16	Syracuse	41–35	2–0
3	November 23	Youngstown	57–45	3–0
4	November 26	Buffalo	78–57	4–0
5	November 30	Chicago	64–65	4–1
6	December 3	@ Indianapolis	58–59	4–2
7	December 5	@ Buffalo	54–44	5–2
8	December 7	Toledo	60–44	6–2
9	December 8	@ Toledo	67–63	7–2
10	December 10	@ Detroit	65–54	8–2
11	December 14	Sheboygan	53–51	9–2
12	December 17	Fort Wayne	55–51	10–2
13	December 19	@ Sheboygan	59–52	11–2
14	December 20	@ Chicago	48–59	11–3
15	December 21	@ Oshkosh	58–63	11–4
16	December 28	Indianapolis	57–48	12–4
17	December 29	@ Fort Wayne	67–65 (OT)	13–4
18	December 30	@ Anderson	67–62	14–4
19	January 4	Detroit	72–54	15–4
20	January 11	Anderson	75–69 (OT)	16–4
21	January 14	Oshkosh	73–58	17–4
22	January 18	Youngstown	67–53	18–4
23	January 23	@ Syracuse	60–53	19–4
24	January 25	Toledo	86–88 (OT)	19–5
25	January 27	@ Youngstown	68–61 (OT)	20–5
26	February 2	Indianapolis	74–66	21–5
27	February 5	@ Toledo	69–50	22–5
28	February 6	@ Detroit	71–53	23–5
29	February 8	Fort Wayne	67–72	23–6
30	February 10	@ Anderson	54–60	23–7
31	February 11	@ Indianapolis	50–47	24–7
32	February 12	@ Fort Wayne	60–64	24–8
33	February 15	Detroit	93–56	25–8
34	February 17	@ Buffalo/Tri-Cities‡	50–60	25–9
35	February 19	@ Oshkosh	53–60	25–10
36	February 20	@ Sheboygan	49–52	25–11
37	February 21	@ Chicago	56–57	25–12
38	February 23	Tri-Cities	41–48	25–13
39†	February 25	Chicago	41–39 (2OT; Protested)	26–13†
39/40	March 1	Syracuse	63–54	26–13 (27–13†)
40/41	March 4	Sheboygan	65–55	27–13 (28–13†)
41/42	March 8	Anderson	64–59	28–13 (29–13†)
42/43	March 10	@ Syracuse	60–54	29–13 (30–13†)
43/44	March 11	Oshkosh	76–68	30–13 (31–13†)
44*	March 13	Chicago	75–55	31–13*

‡ – The February 17, 1947 road game the Rochester Royals had originally scheduled against the second version of the Buffalo Bisons in the NBL before they moved to Moline, Illinois and rebranded themselves as the Tri-Cities Blackhawks was one of two games that had originally been scheduled for the Buffalo Bisons that were still kept intact as a home match for the Tri-Cities Blackhawks on the same scheduled night of play (with the other match in question that kept the same home match in question being on February 20, 1947 against the Toledo Jeeps).
† – The original match played on February 25, 1947 was later considered to be a no contest match due to the way the second overtime that was played was implementing a sudden-death overtime rule without prior warning or agreement at hand. The official results would later be held on March 13, 1947, which was done in a blowout 75–55 victory that didn't require any overtimes for Rochester to defeat Chicago that night.
* – Would be the official final game played and record for the Rochester Royals this season in terms of the NBL schedule they played.

=== Eastern Division ===
Pos.	Eastern Division	Wins	Losses	Win %
1	Rochester Royals	31	13	.705
2	Fort Wayne Zollner Pistons	25	19	.568
T–3	Syracuse Nationals	21	23	.477
T–3	Toledo Jeeps	21	23	.477
5	Buffalo Bisons / Tri-Cities Blackhawks‡	19	25	.432
6	Youngstown Bears	12	32	.273
^{‡} Buffalo relocated primarily into the state of Illinois during the season and assumed Buffalo's team history and record in the standings. Buffalo's record was 5–8, while the Tri-Cities' record was 14–17.

== NBL Playoffs ==
=== NBL Eastern Division Opening Round ===
(1E) Rochester Royals vs. (3/4E) Syracuse Nationals: Rochester wins series 3–1

- Game 1: March 18, 1947 @ Rochester: Rochester 66, Syracuse 64^{(OT)}
- Game 2: March 19, 1947 @ Syracuse: Syracuse 64, Rochester 61
- Game 3: March 21, 1947 @ Rochester: Rochester 54, Syracuse 48
- Game 4: March 22, 1947 @ Syracuse: Rochester 62, Syracuse 57

=== NBL Eastern Division Semifinals ===
(1E) Rochester Royals vs. (2E) Fort Wayne Zollner Pistons: Rochester wins series 2–1

- Game 1: March 29, 1947 @ Rochester: Rochester 58, Fort Wayne 49
- Game 2: March 30, 1947 @ Fort Wayne: Fort Wayne 56, Rochester 49
- Game 3: April 1, 1947 @ Rochester: Rochester 76, Fort Wayne 47

=== NBL Championship ===
(1E) Rochester Royals vs. (3/4W) Chicago American Gears: Chicago wins series 3–1

- Game 1: April 3, 1947 @ Rochester: Rochester 71, Chicago 65
- Game 2: April 5, 1947 @ Rochester: Chicago 67, Rochester 63
- Game 3: April 7, 1947 @ Chicago: Chicago 78, Rochester 70
- Game 4: April 9, 1947 @ Chicago: Chicago 79, Rochester 68

== Team statistics ==
=== Regular season ===
Rank	Player	Position	Games played	Field goals	Free throws made	Free throws attempted	Points per game
1	Al Cervi	G-F	44	5.2	4.0	5.4	14.4
2	Red Holzman	G	44	5.2	1.7	3.2	12.0
3	Bob Davies	G-F	32	5.2	4.1	5.2	14.4
4	George Glamack	C-F	44	3.2	2.0	3.1	8.5
5	Andrew Levane	F-G	39	3.4	1.3	2.2	8.1
6	Arnie Johnson	F-C	32	2.1	2.1	3.1	6.4
7	William King	C-F	41	1.3	1.5	2.4	4.0
8	Al Negratti	F-C	33	0.5	0.4	0.7	1.3
9	Bill Coven	F-C	13	0.8	0.3	0.6	1.8
10	Jack Garfinkel	G	10	0.5	0.3	0.6	1.3
11	Leon Gauchat	G	6	0.2	0.3	0.3	0.7
12	Jim Cominsky	G	5	0.4	0.0	0.0	0.8
13	Jim Quinlan	F	3	0.0	0.3	0.7	0.3
14	Frank Beaty	F	6	0.0	0.2	0.7	0.2

=== NBL Playoffs ===
Rank	Player	Position	Games played	Field goals	Free throws made	Free throws attempted	Points per game
1	Bob Davies	G-F	11	4.9	3.9	5.7	13.7
2	Al Cervi	G-F	11	4.5	4.5	6.2	13.5
3	Red Holzman	G	11	3.8	2.0	2.6	9.6
4	George Glamack	C-F	10	3.5	2.8	3.3	9.8
5	Andrew Levane	F-G	11	3.4	1.6	2.5	8.4
6	William King	C-F	11	2.7	2.8	3.9	8.3
7	Al Negratti	F-C	11	0.3	0.4	0.6	0.9
8	Frank Beaty	F	2	0.5	0.0	1.0	1.0
9	Leon Gauchat	G	2	0.0	0.0	0.0	0.0
10	Bill Coven	F-C	5	0.0	0.0	0.0	0.0

== Awards and Honors ==
- NBL MVP – Bob Davies
- All-NBL First Team – Al Cervi and Bob Davies
- All-NBL Second Team – Red Holzman
- All-Time NBL Team – Al Cervi, Bob Davies, and George Glamack
