= List of NBA players (R) =

This is a list of National Basketball Association players whose last names begin with R.

The list also includes players from the American National Basketball League (NBL), the Basketball Association of America (BAA), and the original American Basketball Association (ABA). All of these leagues contributed to the formation of the present-day NBA.

Individuals who played in the NBL prior to its 1949 merger with the BAA are listed in italics, as they are not traditionally listed in the NBA's official player registers.

== R ==
- Ivan Rabb
- Luther Rackley
- Howie Rader
- Len Rader
- Mark Radford
- Wayne Radford
- Dino Rađa
- Vladimir Radmanović
- Aleksandar Radojević
- Frank Radovich
- Moe Radovich
- Miroslav Raduljica
- Ray Radziszewski
- Jim Rae
- Ray Ragelis
- Sherwin Raiken
- Stan Raiman
- Ed Rains
- Igor Rakočević
- Kurt Rambis
- Peter John Ramos
- Cal Ramsey
- Frank Ramsey
- Jahmi'us Ramsey
- Ray Ramsey
- Mark Randall
- Chasson Randle
- Julius Randle
- Anthony Randolph
- Shavlik Randolph
- Zach Randolph
- Wally Rank
- Kelvin Ransey
- Sam Ranzino
- Bobby Rascoe
- Blair Rasmussen
- Xavier Rathan-Mayes
- George Ratkovicz
- Ed Ratleff
- Mike Ratliff
- Theo Ratliff
- Andy Rautins
- Leo Rautins
- Allan Ray
- Clifford Ray
- Don Ray
- James Ray
- Jim Ray
- Jimmy Rayl
- Craig Raymond
- Maxime Raynaud
- Connie Rea
- Duop Reath
- Austin Reaves
- Joe Reaves
- Josh Reaves
- Željko Rebrača
- Eldridge Recasner
- Michael Redd
- Cam Reddish
- Frank Reddout
- JJ Redick
- Marlon Redmond
- Billy Reed
- Davon Reed
- Hub Reed
- Justin Reed
- Paul Reed
- Ron Reed
- Tarris Reed Jr.
- Willie Reed
- Willis Reed
- Alex Reese
- Julian Reese
- Antonio Reeves
- Bill Reeves
- Bryant Reeves
- Khalid Reeves
- Richie Regan
- Bob Regh
- Don Rehfeldt
- Fred Rehm
- Billy Reid
- Don Reid
- J. R. Reid
- Jim Reid
- Naz Reid
- Robert Reid
- Ryan Reid
- Jared Reiner
- Chick Reiser
- Rube Reiswerg
- Marty Reiter
- Richard Rellford
- Terrence Rencher
- John Rennicke
- Bob Rensberger
- Efthimios Rentzias
- Shawn Respert
- Kevin Restani
- Cameron Reynolds
- George Reynolds
- Jerry Reynolds
- Kendall Rhine
- Jared Rhoden
- Gene Rhodes
- Rodrick Rhodes
- Del Rice
- Glen Rice
- Glen Rice Jr.
- Tommy Rich
- Chris Richard
- Will Richard
- Nick Richards
- Clint Richardson
- Jase Richardson
- Jason Richardson
- Jeremy Richardson
- Josh Richardson
- Malachi Richardson
- Micheal Ray Richardson
- Norman Richardson
- Pooh Richardson
- Quentin Richardson
- Ocie Richie
- Kadary Richmond
- Mitch Richmond
- John Richter
- Dick Ricketts
- Isaiah Rider
- Jackie Ridgle
- Luke Ridnour
- Bill Riebe
- Mel Riebe
- Bob Riedy
- Jim Riffey
- Antoine Rigaudeau
- Ted Rigg
- Tom Riker
- Bob Riley
- Eric Riley
- Pat Riley
- Ron Riley
- Will Riley
- Grant Riller
- Rich Rinaldi
- Mike Riordan
- Zaccharie Risacher
- Arnie Risen
- Eddie Riska
- Tex Ritter
- Ramón Rivas
- Austin Rivers
- David Rivers
- Doc Rivers
- Jule Rivlin
- Jerry Rizzo
- Lee Robbins
- Liam Robbins
- Red Robbins
- André Roberson
- Anthony Roberson
- Rick Roberson
- Terrance Roberson
- Anthony Roberts
- Bill Roberts
- Brian Roberts
- Fred Roberts
- Glenn Roberts
- Joe Roberts
- Lawrence Roberts
- Marv Roberts
- Stanley Roberts
- Wyman Roberts
- Alvin Robertson
- Oscar Robertson
- Ryan Robertson
- Tony Robertson
- Rick Robey
- Bernard Robinson
- Chris Robinson
- Cliff Robinson (b. 1960)
- Clifford Robinson (b. 1966)
- David Robinson
- Devin Robinson
- Duncan Robinson
- Eddie Robinson
- Flynn Robinson
- Glenn Robinson
- Glenn Robinson III
- Jackie Robinson
- Jamal Robinson
- James Robinson
- Jerome Robinson
- Justin Robinson
- Larry Robinson
- Mitchell Robinson
- Nate Robinson
- Oliver Robinson
- Orlando Robinson
- Ronnie Robinson
- Rumeal Robinson
- Sam Robinson
- Thomas Robinson
- Truck Robinson
- Wayne Robinson
- Wil Robinson
- Jeremiah Robinson-Earl
- Bill Robinzine
- Dave Robisch
- Isaiah Roby
- Red Rocha
- John Roche
- Gene Rock
- Jack Rocker
- David Roddy
- Guy Rodgers
- Dennis Rodman
- Abel Rodrigues
- Sergio Rodríguez
- Lou Roe
- Carlos Rogers
- Harry Rogers
- Johnny Rogers
- Marshall Rogers
- Rodney Rogers
- Roy Rogers
- Willie Rogers
- Al Roges
- Ken Rohloff
- Kenny Rollins
- Phil Rollins
- Ryan Rollins
- Tree Rollins
- Lorenzo Romar
- Rajon Rondo
- Jerry Rook
- Sean Rooks
- Pat Rooney
- Swede Roos
- Derrick Rose
- Jalen Rose
- Malik Rose
- Robert Rose
- Petey Rosenberg
- Lennie Rosenbluth
- Hank Rosenstein
- Dick Rosenthal
- Gene Rosenthal
- Quinton Ross
- Terrence Ross
- Carl Roth
- Doug Roth
- Scott Roth
- Irv Rothenberg
- Les Rothman
- Mickey Rottner
- Dan Roundfield
- Giff Roux
- Ron Rowan
- Curtis Rowe
- Jackson Rowe
- Jim Rowinski
- Derrick Rowland
- Brian Rowsom
- Brandon Roy
- Donald Royal
- Reggie Royals
- Bob Royer
- Clifford Rozier
- Terry Rozier
- Ricky Rubio
- Guy Rucker
- Damjan Rudež
- Delaney Rudd
- John Rudd
- Rex Rudicel
- John Rudometkin
- Michael Ruffin
- Trevor Ruffin
- Paul Ruffner
- Clem Ruh
- Joe Ruklick
- Jeff Ruland
- Bob Rule
- Jerry Rullo
- George Rung
- Rayan Rupert
- Stefano Rusconi
- Brandon Rush
- Kareem Rush
- Mal Rush
- Bill Russell
- Bryon Russell
- Campy Russell
- Cazzie Russell
- D'Angelo Russell
- Frank Russell
- Pierre Russell
- Rubin Russell
- Walker Russell
- Walker Russell Jr.
- Lou Rutter
- Cormac Ryan
- Matt Ryan
