= 1944–45 Philadelphia Sphas season =

American basketball team season

- League champions
- Conference champions
- League: American Basketball League (revived original)
- Head coach: Eddie Gottlieb
- General manager: Eddie Gottlieb
- Owner(s): Eddie Gottlieb
- Arena: Broadwood Hotel

Results
- Record: 22–8 (.733)
- Place: Conference: 1st
- Playoff finish: ABL Champions (Won 2–1 over the Baltimore Bullets)

The Philadelphia Sphas were an early, historical example of an American professional basketball team. The 1944–45 season was the twelfth season played in the now-revived American Basketball League by the Sphas, although they did play in the original rendition of the ABL from 1926 to 1928 as the Philadelphia Warriors, which had no relation to the later BAA franchise of the same name that now exists in the present day as the Golden State Warriors in the NBA. As such, when including the past history of the original ABL with the revived version of the ABL in 1933 following historical problems that related to the Great Depression near the end of 1931, this would technically be the eighteenth official season played by the original ABL properly, though this would officially be the 28th season of play for the Sphas franchise when including previous seasons where they played under names like the "Philadelphia YMHA"; the "Philadelphia Passon, Gottlieb, Black", the "Philadelphia Warriors"; and the "Philadelphia Hebrews".

== Background ==
The Sphas played in leagues around Philadelphia since 1917, but game-by-game records before the Sphas rejoined the ABL in 1933 are not (currently) available (at least, not to the general public if official game records did exist for the Sphas) and are therefore likely lost to time itself. Following the tensions of World War II coming closer to its end combined with the desire to add more teams into their league following another season of theirs where the number of teams dwindled down to only four surviving teams for that season (including the Sphas), the ABL decided to permanently adopt a full regular season schedule into their formatting (similar to what the rivaling National Basketball League had already done in its entire history) while also adding enough new teams (including a future BAA/NBA team in the original Baltimore Bullets franchise) on their ends in order to have a proper playoff format that was similar to what the NBL had done in some of its previous seasons before this recent season of theirs when they decided to revive their divisional formatting (though the ABL would decide to have a best-of-three championship series this time around instead of a best-of-five championship series or even a best-of-seven championship series at hand).

Due to the ABL adding in more teams into their league this season (despite utilizing one whole, full regular season instead of two half-seasons for an entire regular season going forward in the ABL's existence), the ABL would give their teams a full schedule that would compare to the rivaling National Basketball League in terms of length this season. As such, when the Sphas tried to return to being a championship team for seventh time in twelve overall seasons of play, they would end up becoming the best team of the entire league in the regular season with a 22–8 record, being one game ahead of the Trenton Tigers for a first place finish. However, because of the new expansion that the ABL had this season, the ABL would once again return to the playoff formatting that was used during the 1938–39 season, with the #1 seeded Sphas going up against the #3 seeded defending champion Wilmington Bombers and the #2 seeded Trenton Tigers going up against the #4 seeded expansion team known as the Baltimore Bullets. In the semifinal round, Philadelphia and Wilmington would split the first two games of the series (with the Bombers having a blowout 48–29 win in Game 2) before the Sphas secured a 48–41 victory for a 2–1 series victory to advance into the championship round, they were would not go up against the Trenton Tigers but the 14–16 Baltimore Bullets expansion franchise instead. Despite Baltimore's unimpressive looking standing upon first glance, the Bullets would upset the Sphas in the first game of the championship series with a 57–32 blowout defeat on Philadelphia's end. However, the Sphas would end up bouncing back in their following two games in the championship series afterward to reclaim their championship standing one more time, securing their standing as a dynasty in the ABL by being seven time champions of that league for twelve straight seasons of play, as well as being ten-time champions in sixteen straight seasons of play between their split time playing in the Eastern Basketball League and the revived version of the American Basketball League (with those championships also joining the ones they previously won in the 1923–24 season under the Philadelphia League and in the following 1924–25 season under the Philadelphia Basket Ball League). Unfortunately, while it was a part of the franchise's best of times, it would also be a part of the Sphas' incoming decline in the following seasons afterward as the ABL itself would soon see its own major decline within the late 1940s as well that later led to both of their untimely endings by the 1950s.

== Roster ==
Due to information on American Basketball League players being generally hard to find, there are bound to be more gaps and/or inaccuracies found in certain areas on the team's roster spots than usual.

1944–45 Philadelphia Sphas roster
Players

Pos.	No.	Player	Height	Weight	DOB	From
G		Jerry Fleishman	6 ft 2 in (1.88 m)	190 lb (86 kg)	1922–02–14	NYU
G		Jack Garfinkel	6 ft 0 in (1.83 m)	190 lb (86 kg)	1918–06–13	St. John's
C		Art Hillhouse	6 ft 7 in (2.01 m)	220 lb (100 kg)	1916–06–12	Long Island
F/C		Inky Lautman	6 ft 2 in (1.88 m)	205 lb (93 kg)	1914–05–22	Central HS (PA)
G/F		Bill Levine	6 ft 3 in (1.91 m)	195 lb (88 kg)	1921–07–20	CCNY
G		Chink Morganstine	6 ft 0 in (1.83 m)	200 lb (91 kg)	1918–05–09	Temple
G		Bernard Opper	6 ft 0 in (1.83 m)	185 lb (84 kg)	1915–09–01	Kentucky
G/F		Howie Rader	6 ft 1 in (1.85 m)	190 lb (86 kg)	1921–03–29	Long Island
G/F		Len Rader	6 ft 1 in (1.85 m)	185 lb (84 kg)	1921–03–29	Long Island
G		Petey Rosenberg	5 ft 10 in (1.78 m)	165 lb (75 kg)	1918–04–07	Saint Joseph's
C		Irv Rothenberg	6 ft 7 in (2.01 m)	215 lb (98 kg)	1921–12–31	Long Island
G/F		Ossie Schectman	6 ft 0 in (1.83 m)	175 lb (79 kg)	1919–03–30	Long Island
G		Al Schneider	5 ft 10 in (1.78 m)	170 lb (77 kg)	1918–04–12	Long Island
F		Irv Torgoff	6 ft 2 in (1.88 m)	192 lb (87 kg)	1917–03–06	Long Island

Coaches
Head coach
- Eddie Gottlieb

Legend
- (DP) Unsigned draft pick
- (FA) Free agent
- (S) Suspended
- Injured

Note: Bill Levine, Chink Morganstine, and Al Schneider would not play with the team while in the 1945 ABL Playoffs. Also, Tom Gordon from the New York Westchesters would accidentally score 2 points for the Sphas by scoring in the wrong basket during a match.

== ABL Standings ==
Pos.	Team	Wins	Losses	Win %
1	Philadelphia SPHAs	22	8	.733
2	Trenton Tigers	21	9	.700
3	Wilmington Bombers	14	14	.500
4	Baltimore Bullets	14	16	.467
5	New York Westchesters / Westchester Indians / New York Gothams^{[a]}	11	15	.423
6	Washington Capitols / Paterson Crescents^{[b]}	3	23	.115

== ABL Schedule ==
For the rest of the ABL's entire existence going forward, the ABL would utilize a proper, full regular season instead of two half-seasons for its regular season formatting.

=== ABL Regular Season ===
Game	Date	Opponent	Score	Record
1	November 11	Wilmington Bombers	64–62 (2OT)	1–0
2	November 12	@ Wilmington Bombers	35–45	1–1
3	November 19	@ Trenton Tigers	42–31	2–1
4	November 30	@ Baltimore Bullets	39–34	3–1
5	December 2	New York Westchesters / Westchester Indians^{[a]}	43–30	4–1
6	December 9	Trenton Tigers	39–41	4–2
7	December 16	Baltimore Bullets	44–49	4–3
8	December 23	Washington Capitols^{[b]}	60–46	5–3
9	December 29	@ New York Westchesters / Westchester Indians^{[a]}	39–41	5–4
10	January 4	@ Baltimore Bullets	39–34	6–4
11	January 6	Trenton Tigers	44–42	7–4
12	January 7	@ Wilmington Bombers	38–41	7–5
13	January 13	Paterson Crescents^{[b]}	48–36	8–5
14	January 14	@ Trenton Tigers	52–56	8–6
15	January 20	Wilmington Bombers	32–19	9–6
16	January 25	@ Baltimore Bullets	43–36	10–6
17	January 27	New York Gothams^{[a]}	47–42	11–6
18	February 3	Baltimore Bullets	38–37	12–6
19	February 10	Trenton Tigers	46–37	13–6
20	February 11	@ Wilmington Bombers	42–38	14–6
21	February 14	@ Paterson Crescents^{[b]}	54–46	15–6
22	February 17	New York Gothams^{[a]}	45–40	16–6
23	February 23	@ Trenton Tigers	32–51	16–7
24	February 24	Baltimore Bullets	41–36	17–7
25	February 25	@ New York Gothams^{[a]}	37–31	18–7
26	March 3	Wilmington Bombers	47–39	19–7
27	March 10	Paterson Crescents^{[b]}	58–52	20–7
28	March 11	@ Paterson Crescents^{[b]}	41–40 (OT)	21–7
29	March 18	Paterson Crescents^{[b]}	43–20	22–7
30	March 25	@ New York Gothams^{[a]}	36–45	22–8

=== ABL Playoffs ===
For this season, the ABL would go back to the original playoff format they had used in the past, which involved the #1 seed going up against the #3 seed and the #2 seed going up against the #4 seed in a best-of-three series before the remaining two teams competed against each other in the championship series (though the championship series for this season would be a best-of-three series this time around instead of a best-of-five series). For the Sphas, as the #1 seed and best team of the ABL this season, they would go up against the defending champion Wilmington Bombers in the semifinal round.

==== ABL Semifinals ====
Game	Date	Opponent	Score	Record
Game 1	March 17	Wilmington Bombers	49–44	1–0
Game 2	March 21	@ Wilmington Bombers	29–48	1–1
Game 3	March 31	Wilmington Bombers	48–41	2–1

==== ABL Championship Series ====
For some unknown reason, the ABL would have their championship series for this season go into a best-of-three series similar to the semifinal round instead of a best-of-five or even a best-of-seven series this time around. However, the ABL did intend for this championship series to be a regular best-of-five series at first, but likely due to scheduling conflicts or timing issues or something similar to that kind of nature, they ultimately shifted their championship series to a best-of-three series this time around instead. This championship series would have them go up against the #4 seeded Baltimore Bullets expansion franchise instead of the #2 seeded Trenton Tigers this time around, with Baltimore later becoming a future BAA/NBA franchise a few seasons afterward.

Game	Date	Opponent	Score	Record
Game 1	April 5	@ Baltimore Bullets	57–32	1–0
Game 2	April 7	Baltimore Bullets	46–47	1–1
Game 3	April 14	Baltimore Bullets	46–40	2–1

This would end up becoming the last championship that the Philadelphia Sphas franchise would ever win throughout the rest of their history.

== Notes ==
^{a} The New York Westchesters (sometimes referred to as the Westchester Indians) would move from White Plains, New York to nearby Brooklyn, New York on January 20, 1945, thus subsequently changing their team name from the New York Westchesters (or Westchester Indians) to the New York Gothams in the process.
^{b} The Washington Capitols (no relation to the Washington Capitols team from the BAA/NBA that briefly moved to the ABL at one point in time themselves) would move from Washington, D.C. to Paterson, New Jersey on January 1, 1945, thus subsequently changing their team name from the original Washington Capitols ABL team to the Paterson Crescents in the process. The Capitols held a 2–8 record before moving to Paterson, while the Crescents had a 1–15 record for the rest of the season going forward.
