= Professional Basketball League of America =

- Sport: Basketball
- Founded: 1947
- Folded: 1947
- No. of teams: 16
- Country: United States
- Last champion: none

The Professional Basketball League of America was a basketball league in the United States that existed for less than one month in 1947. It was launched in response to the tremendous upsurge in interest in basketball in the era immediately following World War II and based on the success of the Chicago American Gears and its star center, George Mikan. Despite being owned by the American Gears' team owner (Maurice White) and The Commercial Sports Advertisers, Inc. and being very ambitious in nature, the organization was still underfunded when compared to its competitors, the younger Basketball Association of America, the National Basketball League that the American Gears had defected from (despite recently being champions there), and even the older American Basketball League; there was simply not enough room in the marketplace for four major professional basketball leagues going on at once. The PBLA folded on November 13, 1947 after playing only 54 games among its 16 teams.

Today the league is best known for George Mikan, the star center for the Chicago American Gears. After the PBLA's collapse, rights to its players were distributed among NBL teams via a dispersal draft. The first pick belonged to the new Minneapolis Lakers, the successor to the Detroit Gems, which had finished the previous season 4–40. The Lakers selected Mikan with the first pick, launching what would become the first dynasty in the NBA's history.

Five people associated with the PBLA have been inducted into the Naismith Memorial Basketball Hall of Fame:

- George Mikan, center for the Chicago American Gears
- Bobby McDermott, player/coach for the Chicago American Gears
- Dutch Dehnert, coach of the Chattanooga Majors
- Chuck Hyatt, coach of the Kansas City Blues
- Forrest DeBernardi, general manager of the Tulsa Ranchers

In addition to them, Gerald Ford, the future 38th President of the United States, also served for the Grand Rapids Rangers as a business manager for the team next to head coach Stan Szukala.

== Teams ==
Northern Division

- Chicago American Gears (8-0)
- St. Paul Saints (6-3)
- Grand Rapids Rangers (3–3)
- Louisville Colonels (2–4)
- Omaha Tomahawks (2–4)
- Kansas City Blues (1–5)
- Waterloo Pro-Hawks (1–5)
- St. Joseph Outlaws (1–6)

Southern Division

- Houston Mavericks (2–0)
- Atlanta Crackers (7–1)
- Tulsa Ranchers (7–3)
- Birmingham Skyhawks (5–2)
- Chattanooga Majors (3–3)
- New Orleans Hurricanes (3–5)
- Oklahoma City Drillers (2–3)
- Springfield Squires (1–7)

== Notable players ==
- Rex Barney
- Moe Becker
- Ed Bogdanski
- Price Brookfield
- Harold Brown
- Bob Calihan
- Frank Carswell
- Bill Closs
- Jim Cominsky
- Bill Davis
- Red Dehnert
- Grant Dunlap
- Jack Dwan
- Charlie Epperson
- Bob Fitzgerald
- Ben Gardner
- Frank Gates
- Jim Gibbs
- John Gibbs
- Al Grenert
- Art Grove
- Coulby Gunther
- Bruce Hale
- Billy Hassett
- Bill Henry
- Bobby Holm
- Hal Hutcheson
- Noble Jorgensen
- Tony Kaseta
- Wibs Kautz
- Ken Keller
- Tony Kelly
- Weldon Kern
- Harold Kottman
- Dave Latter
- Fred Lewis
- Del Loranger
- Jack Maddox
- Mike McCarron
- Bobby McDermott
- Tom Meyer
- George Mikan
- Harry Miller
- Dale Morey
- Elmore Morgenthaler
- Fritz Nagy
- Bob O'Brien
- Bud O'Rourke
- Eddie Oram
- Jack Oxenrider
- Allie Paine
- Eddie Parry
- Pete Pasko
- Marty Passaglia
- Joe Patanelli
- Howie Rader
- Len Rader
- George Ratkovicz
- Bill Roberts
- Gene Rock
- Abel Rodrigues
- Swede Roos
- Johnny Sebastian
- Paul Seymour
- John Simmons
- Dick Starzyk
- Art Stolkey
- Stan Szukala
- Homer Thompson
- Dick Triptow
- Virgil Vaughn
- Ken Walters
- Jack Watkins
- Stan Waxman
- Willie Wells
