= 1947–48 Chicago American Gears season =

Aborted PBLA professional basketball team season

- Division champions
- Head coach: Bobby McDermott (player-coach)
- General manager: Henry A. Bourne
- Owners: Maurice White; American Gear & Manufacturing Company (owned all 16 PBLA teams)
- Arena: International Amphitheatre

Results
- Record: 8–0 (1.000)
- Place: Division: 1st (Northern)
- Playoff finish: Did not happen; league shut down operations (voted out of returning to the NBL) Championship claimed based on record.
- Radio: WCFL

The 1947–48 Chicago American Gears season was the American Gears' fifth and final year of existence as a franchise, as well as their first and only season where they attempted to exist as a franchise under their own league in the Professional Basketball League of America (PBLA), which would rival all three of the major professional basketball leagues of the time in the older American Basketball League (ABL), the newer Basketball Association of America (BAA), and the United States' National Basketball League (NBL), which the American Gears originally existed from before defecting from the NBL due to Indianapolis Kautskys co-owner Paul Walk being named the new league president over team owner Maurice White late in the summer. Originally, White planned to have the PBLA consist of 32 teams (including his American Gears) in the Northern, Southern, Eastern, and Western Divisions throughout a 90-game schedule before he and The Commercial Sports Advertisers, Inc. (the PBLA's parent organization) ultimately cut the number of official teams in half to have 16 competing teams in the Northern and Southern Divisions (with White's American Gears in the Northern Division) for what would turn out to be the only season the PBLA would ever have. White also planned to back the PBLA for only the inaugural season, with each team operating at a salary cap of $47,000 this season without a limit on what players could receive and having eleven players on their roster until December 1, 1947, before cutting down to nine players by the end of March, which would have been the PBLA's original end-point for its regular season.

At the time of the new league's implementation, the Chicago American Gears left the majority of their roster intact; Pete Fogo from Pepperdine University, Fritz Nagy from the University of Akron, Charlie Molnor from the Los Angeles City College, and Billy Hassett of the Tri-Cities Blackhawks would be added onto the roster, while a few of the American Gears' players were named head coaches for PBLA teams (Bruce Hale for the St. Paul Saints, Stan Szukala for the Grand Rapids Rangers (who also had future U.S. President Gerald Ford working with the team as a business manager of Szukala's), Swede Roos for the Waterloo Pro-Hawks), with Price Brookfield playing for the Waterloo Pro-Hawks, Art Stoefen playing for the Amateur Athletic Union's Los Angeles Carroll Shamrocks, and Max Morris opted to play for the Chicago Rockets in the All-American Football Conference instead. While the PBLA began its season on October 24, the American Gears didn't start playing until a week later on Halloween with a 59–49 victory over the St. Paul Saints under 3,128 attendees. After three straight days of games that ended in victories for Chicago, the American Gears would have their first (and what would later turn out to be their only) home game occur on November 7 as a doubleheader night involving another PBLA game being played between the Louisville Colonels and Omaha Tomahawks before Chicago's match began; the American Gears would blow out the New Orleans Hurricanes with a 97–65 victory (with Chicago being considered to have scoring records for both the NBL and the PBLA at the time), though despite free parking and considerably good prices for the time (general admission had tickets for $1.20, while reserved seating had tickets going for $1.50, $1.80, and $2.40), only 2,477 people would see that match occur. After three more road games played (all of which also ended up being victories for Chicago), the American Gears was slated to play their second home game on November 13 (which was suggested to have been against the Atlanta Crackers) before Maurice White informed the team that the PBLA had folded operations due to the league losing $600,000 (including promotional expenses) in less than a month's time of operation, with the American Gears being the best team of the league at the time with a perfect 8–0 record. The day after that, the NBL met up to decide upon whether they would allow the American Gears to return into their league again (despite already beginning their season earlier on) or have them fold operations for good; while the American Gears had seen some promise in their return at first through the idea of the Minneapolis Lakers rescinding their nay vote and some teams being willing to allow the team to return to the NBL so long as Maurice White (who NBL owners hated due to his propensity to spend a lot of money on players like George Mikan for competition's sake alongside his problems with alcoholism combined with being a loud and boorish personality) was no longer operating the team and replaced with John McNulty, the NBL ultimately unanimously voted 11–0 to deny the American Gears readmission into the NBL, thus officially ending their season early and disbanding their franchise for good following a dispersal draft by the NBL. The PBLA would be seen upon retrospect as a league far ahead of its time in some aspects, but would also be seen as folly for one man to try to make succeed on its own accord, as well as was later seen as an instigator to create the modern-day National Basketball Association that helped end what can be considered the wild west era of professional basketball's early history.

An entire chapter from former player Dick Triptow's book, "The Dynasty That Never Was: Chicago's First Professional Basketball Champions, The American Gears", would be dedicated to this season, with it also showcasing greater details on the existence of the Professional Basketball League of America as well. It also showcased comments from past players that were on the American Gears at the time, commenting on the team's all-time greatness at the time and how they could have been a true dynasty had they not defected from the NBL this season, with former WGN-TV broadcaster Jack Brickhouse (who had intended to be the radio broadcaster for Chicago's games this season) also noting that the only two Chicago professional sports franchises with championships won that were completely mismanaged in their histories were the NFL's Chicago Cardinals and the Chicago American Gears.

== (Potential) Draft picks ==
The Chicago American Gears might have participated in the 1947 NBL draft, which occurred right after the 1947 BAA draft due to a joint agreement the National Basketball League and the rivaling Basketball Association of America had with each other during the offseason period. However, it's entirely possible they might not have entered that draft due to Maurice White's shrewd move to leave the NBL when he did so. However, if the American Gears did leave the NBL before that league's draft happened, it's likely that, as of 2026, no records of what the final draft picks for the American Gears might have been when they were still in the NBL have properly come up, with any information on who those selections might have been being lost to time in the process.

== Roster ==
1947–48 Chicago American Gears roster
Players

Pos.	No.	Player	Height	Weight	DOB	From
G/F		Bob Calihan	6 ft 3 in (1.91 m)	200 lb (91 kg)	1918–08–02	Detroit
F/C		Pete Fogo	6 ft 5 in (1.96 m)	180 lb (82 kg)	1921–10–14	Pepperdine
G		Billy Hassett	5 ft 10 in (1.78 m)	185 lb (84 kg)	1921–10–21	Notre Dame
G		Bobby McDermott	5 ft 11 in (1.80 m)	180 lb (82 kg)	1914–01–07	Flushing HS (NY)
C		George Mikan	6 ft 10 in (2.08 m)	245 lb (111 kg)	1924–06–18	DePaul
G		Charlie Molnor	6 ft 0 in (1.83 m)	168 lb (76 kg)	1925–12–06	Los Angeles City College
F/C		Max Morris	6 ft 2 in (1.88 m)	195 lb (88 kg)	1925–03–13	Northwestern
G/F		Fritz Nagy	6 ft 2 in (1.88 m)	170 lb (77 kg)	1924–01–03	Akron
G/F		Stan Patrick	6 ft 2 in (1.88 m)	185 lb (84 kg)	1922–05–05	Illinois
G/F		Dick Triptow	6 ft 0 in (1.83 m)	170 lb (77 kg)	1922–11–03	DePaul

Coaches
Head coach
- Bobby McDermott

Legend
- (DP) Unsigned draft pick
- (FA) Free agent
- (S) Suspended
- Injured

Note: Max Morris was considered to be a part of the roster, but did not play for them this season due to an injury he sustained while playing football for the Chicago Rockets in the All-American Football Conference.

== Regular season ==
=== PBLA Schedule ===
Reference: Dick Triptow's The Dynasty That Never Was, pg. 134

#	Date	Opponent	Score	Record
1	October 31	@ St. Paul Saints	59–49	1–0
2	November 1	@ Waterloo Pro-Hawks	82–56	2–0
3	November 2	@ St. Joseph Outlaws	80–66	3–0
4	November 3	@ Omaha Tomahawks	74–52	4–0
5	November 7	New Orleans Hurricanes	97–65	5–0
6	November 9	@ Tulsa Ranchers	51–48	6–0
7	November 10	@ Springfield Squires	75–61	7–0
8	November 12	@ Louisville Colonels	65–56	8–0

The Professional Basketball League of America was scheduled to have a grand total of 90 regular season games, with 45 road games and 45 home games involving each team playing each other both at home and on the road three different times with each other.

=== Season standings ===
All results would be based on an incomplete season by November 13, 1947.

==== Northern Division ====
Pos.	Team	Wins	Losses	Win %
1	Chicago American Gears	8	0	1.000
2	St. Paul Saints	6	3	.667
3	Grand Rapids Rangers	3	3	.500
T–4	Louisville Colonels	2	4	.333
T–4	Omaha Tomahawks	2	4	.333
T–6	Kansas City Blues	1	5	.167
T–6	Waterloo Pro-Hawks	1	5	.167
8	St. Joseph Outlaws	1	6	.143

==== Southern Division ====
Pos.	Team	Wins	Losses	Win %
1	Houston Mavericks	2	0	1.000
2	Atlanta Crackers	7	1	.875
3	Birmingham Skyhawks	5	2	.714
4	Tulsa Ranchers	7	3	.700
5	Chattanooga Majors	3	3	.500
6	Oklahoma City Drillers	2	3	.400
7	New Orleans Hurricanes	3	5	.375
8	Springfield Squires	1	7	.125
