= 1937–38 Dayton Metropolitans season =

NBL professional basketball team season

- Head coach: Bill Hosket Sr. (player-coach)
- Owner: Dayton Metropolitan Clothing Stores
- Arena: Montgomery County Fairgrounds Coliseum

Results
- Record: 2–11 (.154)
- Place: Division: 7th (Western)
- Playoff finish: Did not qualify

The 1937–38 Dayton Metropolitans season was the first and only professional season played for the Dayton Metropolitans in Dayton, Ohio under the National Basketball League, which officially was the first season that it existed as a professional basketball league after previously existing as a semi-pro or amateur basketball league called the Midwest Basketball Conference in its first two seasons back in 1935. However, if you include their first two seasons when they existed in the Midwest Basketball Conference as both the Dayton Metropolitans and the Dayton London Bobbys (the latter name back when they were owned by the Miami Valley Brewing Company), this would actually be this team's third and final season of play for the Dayton franchise instead. Not only that, but if you include their two seasons as both the Metropolitans and the London Bobbys, then Dayton would join the Akron Firestone Non-Skids, the Indianapolis Kautskys, and the Pittsburgh Y.M.H.A. team turned Pittsburgh Pirates NBL team as the only four MBC teams that played both seasons in that original league in question before moving on up into the NBL. In addition to that, they would be one of seven teams to compete in the Western Division this season, with them representing thirteen inaugural NBL teams to compete in the first season under the NBL name, comprising six teams competing in the Eastern Division and seven teams competing in the Western Division.

During the season, Dayton would win their first two games of the season at home against both the Whiting Ciesar All-Americans and the Columbus Athletic Supply team before losing every other NBL game in their season, including the very first NBL match the Oshkosh All-Stars ever had once they officially joined the NBL. Even though two official results for games that Dayton would lose to the Kankakee Gallagher Trojans are currently unknown for their official game results (to the point where they might very well be lost to time, especially if they were both considered forfeited defeats by Dayton at some point in the season for whatever reason), the 2–11 record that Dayton had would not only showcase them easily failing to qualify for the inaugural NBL Playoffs this season (with their record only being better than just the aforementioned Columbus Athletic Supply team they had beaten at home early on in the season), but they also were one of six NBL teams to either straight up leave the NBL for barnstorming purposes or otherwise fold operations altogether, with the Metropolitans deciding to fold operations altogether on their ends (though an unrelated Dayton Metropolitans team would later be created by the late 1940s that would feature some African Americans like two-time NBL player Duke Cumberland and future NBA All-Star and Basketball Hall of Famer Nat Clifton (both of whom would usually play for all-black teams like the Harlem Globetrotters or the New York Renaissance during this time) playing for them by that time).

== Roster ==
Please note that due to the way records for professional basketball leagues like the NBL and the ABL were recorded at the time, some information on both teams and players may be harder to list out than usual here.

Player	Position
Bobby Colburn	G-F
Beryl Drummond	G-F
Bill Hosket Sr.	C
Curt McMahon	G
Bud Moodler	G-F
Glenn Roberts	C-F
Wyman Roberts	G-F
Lou Rutter	G-F
Glenn Schlechty	C-F
Howard Stammler	G-F
Clovis Stark	F
Norm Wagner	C

== Regular season ==
=== Season standings ===
Pos	Western Division	Wins	Losses	Win %
1	Oshkosh All-Stars	12	2	.857
2	Whiting Ciesar All-Americans	12	3	.800
3	Fort Wayne General Electrics	13	7	.650
4	Indianapolis Kautskys	4	9	.308
5	Richmond King Clothiers / Cincinnati Comellos^{‡}	3	7	.300
6	Kankakee Gallagher Trojans	3	11	.214
7	Dayton Metropolitans	2	11	.154
^{‡} Richmond relocated to Cincinnati during the season and assumed Richmond's record in the standings. Richmond's record was 1–2 and Cincinnati's record was 2–5.

=== NBL Schedule ===
An official database created by John Grasso detailing every NBL match possible (outside of two matches that the Kankakee Gallagher Trojans won over the Dayton Metropolitans in 1938) would be released in 2026 showcasing every team's official schedules throughout their time spent in the NBL. As such, outside of the two games where the Dayton Metropolitans lost to the Kankakee Gallagher Trojans sometime in 1938 (potentially in February 1938 via forfeiture), these are the official results recorded for the Dayton Metropolitans in their only season in the NBL.

- December 19, 1937 @ Dayton, OH: Whiting Ciesar All-Americans 34, Dayton Metropolitans 38
- December 26, 1937 (Game 1 @ Dayton, OH): Columbus Athletic Supply 22, Dayton Metropolitans 23
- December 26, 1937 (Game 2 @ Columbus, OH): Dayton Metropolitans 28, Columbus Athletic Supply 31
- December 30, 1937 @ Fort Wayne, IN: Dayton Metropolitans 17, Fort Wayne General Electrics 42
- January 1, 1938 @ Oshkosh, WI: Dayton Metropolitans 43, Oshkosh All-Stars 44
- January 2, 1938 @ Whiting, IN: Dayton Metropolitans 47, Whiting Ciesar All-Americans 55
- January 19, 1938 @ Akron: Dayton Metropolitans 28, Akron Firestone Non-Skids 41
- January 23, 1938 @ Dayton, OH: Fort Wayne General Electrics 32, Dayton Metropolitans 25
- January 30, 1938: Dayton Metropolitans 30, Warren Penns 31 (OT @ Dayton, OH)
- February 1938 (potential doubleheader match?): The Kankakee Gallagher Trojans would win the match they played over the Dayton Metropolitans (potentially by forfeiture).
- February 1938 (potential doubleheader match?): The Kankakee Gallagher Trojans would win the match they played over the Dayton Metropolitans (potentially by forfeiture).
- February 5, 1938: Dayton Metropolitans 44, Kankakee Gallagher Trojans 46 (OT @ Kankakee, IL)
- February 20, 1938 @ Dayton, OH: Dayton Metropolitans 30, Akron Firestone Non-Skids 36

Dayton would also win a match against the Buffalo Bisons sometime in January 1938 with a 28–23 final score, though that match was actually considered to be an exhibition match instead of an official NBL scheduled match as one place had originally sourced it as.
