= List of NBA players (W–Z) =

This is a list of National Basketball Association players whose family names begin with W, X, Y, or Z.

The list also includes players from the American National Basketball League (NBL), the Basketball Association of America (BAA), and the original American Basketball Association (ABA). All of these leagues contributed to the formation of the present-day NBA.

Individuals who played in the NBL prior to its 1949 merger with the BAA are listed in italics, as they are not traditionally listed in the NBA's official player registers.

== W ==
- Vaughn Waddell
- Dean Wade
- Dwyane Wade
- Mark Wade
- Von Wafer
- Clint Wager
- Keaton Wagler
- Dajuan Wagner
- Danny Wagner
- Franz Wagner
- Milt Wagner
- Moritz Wagner
- Norm Wagner
- Phil Wagner
- Ish Wainright
- Dion Waiters
- Granville Waiters
- Andre Wakefield
- Neal Walk
- Andy Walker
- Antoine Walker
- Bill Walker
- Brady Walker
- Chet Walker
- Darrell Walker
- Foots Walker
- Horace Walker
- Jabari Walker
- Jarace Walker
- Jimmy Walker
- Kemba Walker
- Lonnie Walker IV
- M. J. Walker
- Phil Walker
- Samaki Walker
- Wally Walker
- John Wall
- Ben Wallace
- Cason Wallace
- Gerald Wallace
- John Wallace
- Keaton Wallace
- Paul Wallace
- Rasheed Wallace
- Red Wallace
- Tyrone Wallace
- Dwight Waller
- Jamie Waller
- Don Walsh
- Jim Walsh
- Jordan Walsh
- Matt Walsh
- Ken Walters
- Rex Walters
- Paul Walther
- Isaac Walthour
- Bill Walton
- Derrick Walton
- Jack Walton
- Lloyd Walton
- Luke Walton
- Brad Wanamaker
- Wang Zhizhi
- Bobby Wanzer
- Perry Warbington
- Charlie Ward
- Gerry Ward
- Henry Ward
- Casper Ware
- Jim Ware
- Kel'el Ware
- Dave Wareham
- Ben Warley
- Bob Warlick
- Cornell Warner
- Jameel Warney
- Don Warnke
- Bob Warren
- John Warren
- T. J. Warren
- Willie Warren
- Bryan Warrick
- Hakim Warrick
- Chris Washburn
- Julian Washburn
- Bobby Washington
- Darius Washington Jr.
- Donald Washington
- Duane Washington (b. 1964)
- Duane Washington Jr. (b. 2000)
- Dwayne "Pearl" Washington
- Eric Washington
- Jim Washington
- Kermit Washington
- P. J. Washington
- Richard Washington
- Stan Washington
- Trooper Washington
- TyTy Washington Jr.
- Wilson Washington
- Zano Wast
- Yuta Watanabe
- Lindy Waters III
- Tremont Waters
- Trendon Watford
- Darryl Watkins
- Jack Watkins
- Jamir Watkins
- Anton Watson
- Bobby Watson
- C. J. Watson
- Chub Watson
- Earl Watson
- Jamie Watson
- Paul Watson
- Peyton Watson
- Ron Watts
- Samuel Watts
- Slick Watts
- Stan Waxman
- Maalik Wayns
- David Wear
- Travis Wear
- Clarence Weatherspoon
- Nick Weatherspoon
- Quinndary Weatherspoon
- Kyle Weaver
- James Webb III
- Jeff Webb
- Marcus Webb
- Spud Webb
- Chris Webber
- Brianté Weber
- Jake Weber
- Elnardo Webster
- Jeff Webster
- Martell Webster
- Marvin Webster
- Scott Wedman
- Sonny Weems
- Dick Wehr
- Brant Weidner
- Bob Weigandt
- Bob Weiss
- Herm Weiss
- Rick Weitzman
- Bonzi Wells
- Bubba Wells
- Jaylen Wells
- Owen Wells
- Ralph Wells
- Chris Welp
- Jiří Welsch
- Thomas Welsh
- Victor Wembanyama
- Bill Wendt
- Bill Wennington
- Matt Wenstrom
- Robert Werdann
- Ray Wertis
- Blake Wesley
- David Wesley
- Walt Wesley
- David West
- Delonte West
- Doug West
- Jerry West
- Mario West
- Mark West
- Roland West
- Dexter Westbrook
- Russell Westbrook
- Paul Westphal
- John Wetzel
- Robert Whaley
- Ennis Whatley
- DeJuan Wheat
- Clinton Wheeler
- Phillip Wheeler
- Tyson Wheeler
- Skippy Whitaker
- Andrew White
- Coby White
- D. J. White
- Dean White
- Derrick White
- Eric White
- Herb White
- Hubie White
- Jack White
- Jahidi White
- James White
- Jo Jo White
- Okaro White
- Randy White
- Rodney White
- Rory White
- Royce White
- Rudy White
- Tony White
- Willie White
- Dariq Whitehead
- Isaiah Whitehead
- Jerome Whitehead
- Donald Whiteside
- Hassan Whiteside
- Dwayne Whitfield
- Warren Whitlinger
- Cam Whitmore
- Charles Whitney
- Chris Whitney
- Hank Whitney
- Greg Whittington
- Shayne Whittington
- Sidney Wicks
- Ron Widby
- Paul Widowitz
- Murray Wier
- Bob Wiesenhahn
- Joe Wieskamp
- John Wiethe
- John Wiggers
- Aaron Wiggins
- Andrew Wiggins
- Mitchell Wiggins
- Lindell Wigginton
- Ken Wilburn
- C. J. Wilcox
- Chris Wilcox
- D. C. Wilcutt
- Gene Wiley
- Jacob Wiley
- Michael Wiley
- Morlon Wiley
- Win Wilfong
- Lenny Wilkens
- Bob Wilkerson
- Jamaal Wilkes
- James Wilkes
- Damien Wilkins
- Dominique Wilkins
- Eddie Lee Wilkins
- Gerald Wilkins
- Jeff Wilkins
- Russ Wilkins
- Dale Wilkinson
- Mike Wilks
- Aaron Williams
- Al Williams
- Alan Williams
- Alondes Williams
- Alvin Williams
- Amari Williams
- Art Williams
- Bernie Williams
- Bob Williams
- Brandon Williams (b. 1975)
- Brandon Williams (b. 1999)
- Buck Williams
- Charlie Williams
- Chuck Williams
- Chuckie Williams
- C. J. Williams
- Cliff Williams
- Cody Williams
- Corey Williams
- Dave Williams
- Deron Williams
- Derrick Williams
- Donovan Williams
- Duck Williams
- Earl Williams
- Elliot Williams
- Eric Williams
- Fly Williams
- Frank Williams
- Freeman Williams
- Gene Williams
- Grant Williams
- Gus Williams
- Guy Williams
- Hank Williams
- Herb Williams
- Jalen Williams
- Jason Williams
- Jawad Williams
- Jay Williams
- Jaylin Williams
- Jayson Williams
- Jerome Williams
- John "Hot Rod" Williams
- John Williams
- Johnathan Williams
- Jordan Williams
- Justin Williams
- Kenny Williams
- Kenrich Williams
- Kevin Williams
- Lorenzo Williams
- Lou Williams
- Malik Williams
- Marcus Williams (b. 1985)
- Marcus Williams (b. 1986)
- Mark Williams
- Marvin Williams
- Matt Williams
- Micheal Williams
- Mike Williams
- Milt Williams
- Mo Williams
- Monty Williams
- Nate Williams (b. 1950)
- Nate Williams (b. 1999)
- Patrick Williams
- Pete Williams
- Ray Williams
- Reggie Williams (b. 1964)
- Reggie Williams (b. 1986)
- Rickey Williams
- Rob Williams
- Robert Williams
- Ron Williams
- Sam Williams (b. 1945)
- Sam Williams (b. 1959)
- Scott Williams
- Sean Williams
- Shammond Williams
- Shawne Williams
- Shelden Williams
- Sly Williams
- Terrence Williams
- Travis Williams
- Vince Williams Jr.
- Walt Williams
- Ward Williams
- Willie Williams
- Ziaire Williams
- Nigel Williams-Goss
- Corliss Williamson
- John Williamson
- Lucas Williamson
- Zion Williamson
- Vann Williford
- Kevin Willis
- Bill Willoughby
- Dedric Willoughby
- Bob Wilson
- Bobby Wilson (b. 1944)
- Bobby Wilson (b. 1951)
- Bubba Wilson
- Caleb Wilson
- D. J. Wilson
- George Wilson (b. 1914)
- George Wilson (b. 1942)
- Harlan Wilson
- Isaiah Wilson
- Jalen Wilson
- Jamil Wilson
- Jasper Wilson
- Jim Wilson
- Mike Wilson
- Nikita Wilson
- Othell Wilson
- Rick Wilson
- Ricky Wilson
- Steve Wilson
- Trevor Wilson
- Kyle Wiltjer
- Kennard Winchester
- Tony Windis
- Dylan Windler
- John Windsor
- Lee Winfield
- David Wingate
- Dontonio Wingfield
- Harthorne Wingo
- Marv Winkler
- Justise Winslow
- Rickie Winslow
- Cassius Winston
- Trevor Winter
- Slim Wintermute
- Brian Winters
- Voise Winters
- Eddie Wisbar
- Skip Wise
- Willie Wise
- James Wiseman
- Herm Witasek
- Jeff Withey
- Luke Witte
- Greg Wittman
- Randy Wittman
- Garry Witts
- Kayo Wnorowski
- Dave Wohl
- Danny Wolf
- Joe Wolf
- Rubén Wolkowyski
- Eddie Wollen
- Nate Wolters
- Tarzan Woltzen
- Isaiah Wong
- Al Wood
- Bob Wood
- Christian Wood
- David Wood
- Howard Wood
- Leon Wood
- Sonny Wood
- Robert Woodard II
- John Wooden
- Loren Woods
- Qyntel Woods
- Randy Woods
- Tommy Woods
- Mike Woodson
- Bob Woollard
- Orlando Woolridge
- Haywoode Workman
- Mark Workman
- Tom Workman
- Metta World Peace
- Willie Worsley
- Sam Worthen
- James Worthy
- Antoine Wright
- Bracey Wright
- Brad Wright
- Brandan Wright
- Chris Wright (b. 1988)
- Chris Wright (b. 1989)
- Delon Wright
- Dorell Wright
- Howard Wright
- Howie Wright
- Joby Wright
- John Wright
- Julian Wright
- Larry Wright
- Leroy Wright
- Lonnie Wright
- Loren Wright
- Lorenzen Wright
- Luther Wright
- McKinley Wright IV
- Moses Wright
- Sharone Wright
- Justin Wright-Foreman
- Tony Wroten
- Tom Wukovits
- Dennis Wuycik
- A. J. Wynder

== Y ==
- Guerschon Yabusele
- Yang Hansen
- Yao Ming
- Barry Yates
- Wayne Yates
- Vincent Yarbrough
- George Yardley
- Charlie Yelverton
- Paul Yesawich
- Yi Jianlian
- Rich Yonakor
- Gabe York
- Nick Yost
- Danny Young
- Jahmir Young
- James Young
- Jewell Young
- Joe Young
- Korleone Young
- Michael Young
- Nick Young
- Perry Young
- Sam Young
- Thaddeus Young
- Tim Young
- Trae Young
- Willis Young
- Chris Youngblood
- Abe Yourist
- Ömer Yurtseven

== Z ==
- Stan Zadel
- Max Zaslofsky
- Zeke Zawoluk
- Cody Zeller
- Dave Zeller
- Gary Zeller
- Harry Zeller
- Luke Zeller
- Tyler Zeller
- Tony Zeno
- Jim Zeravich
- Phil Zevenbergen
- Zhou Qi
- George Zidek
- Babe Ziegenhorn
- Rocco Zikarsky
- Derrick Zimmerman
- Stephen Zimmerman
- Paul Zipser
- Ante Žižić
- Jim Zoet
- Bill Zopf
- Ivica Zubac
- Matt Zunic
