= Curt McMahon =

American basketball player

Personal information
- Born: January 26, 1915 Waterloo, Ohio
- Died: April 28, 1978 (aged 63) Dayton, Ohio
- Listed height: 5 ft 11 in (1.80 m)
- Listed weight: 150 lb (68 kg)

Career information
- High school: Waterloo (Waterloo, Ohio)
- Position: Guard

Career history
- 1937–1938: Dayton Metropolitans

Curtis Omar McMahon (January 26, 1915 – April 28, 1978) was an American professional basketball player. He played in the National Basketball League for the Dayton Metropolitans during the 1937–38 season and averaged 1.9 points per game. In his post-basketball life, McMahon worked as a toolmaker for 32 years.
