= Frank Shannon (disambiguation) =

Frank Shannon may refer to:

- Frank Shannon (1874–1959), Irish actor
- Frank Shannon (baseball) (1873–1934), American baseball player
- Frank Shannon (basketball) (1917–2005), American basketball player
