= Cominsky =

Cominsky is the Americanized form of Polish Komiński. Notable people with the name include:

- Jim Cominsky (1918–2003), American professional basketball player
- John Cominsky (born 1995), American football defensive end
- Lynn Cominsky, American astrophysicist and educator
