= Homer Thompson (basketball) =

American basketball player (1916–2007)

Personal information
- Born: January 18, 1916 Jeffersonville, Indiana, U.S.
- Died: June 19, 2007 (aged 91) Jeffersonville, Indiana, U.S.
- Listed height: 6 ft 4 in (1.93 m)
- Listed weight: 215 lb (98 kg)

Career information
- High school: Jeffersonville (Jeffersonville, Indiana)
- College: Kentucky (1936–1939)
- Playing career: 1939–1948
- Position: Forward / center

Career history
- 1939–1940, 1946: Indianapolis Kautskys
- 1946–1947: Sheboygan Red Skins
- 1947–1948: Louisville Colonels

Homer Winston Thompson (January 18, 1916 – June 19, 2007) was an American professional basketball player. He played for the Indianapolis Kautskys and Sheboygan Red Skins in the National Basketball League, as well as the Louisville Colonels in the Professional Basketball League of America.

Thompson played college basketball at the University of Kentucky (where he also boxed). His professional career was interrupted by serving in World War II. Thompson spent his post-basketball career as a teacher in Jeffersonville, Indiana, before moving to Fort Lauderdale, Florida, in 1958. He then worked for Broward County Board of Health. Thompson returned to Indiana in 2003 before dying several years later.
