= Beryl Drummond =

American basketball player

Personal information
- Born: June 16, 1918 Walnut Township, Ohio
- Died: April 26, 1982 (aged 63) Atlantis, Florida
- Listed height: 6 ft 1 in (1.85 m)
- Listed weight: 185 lb (84 kg)

Career information
- High school: Cadmus (Cadmus, Ohio); Waterloo (Waterloo, Ohio)
- Position: Guard

Career history
- 1937–1938: Dayton Metropolitans
- 1946–1947: Toledo Jeeps

Beryl Esco Drummond (June 16, 1918 – April 26, 1982) was an American professional basketball player. He played in the National Basketball League for the Dayton Metropolitans during the 1937–38 season and for the Toledo Jeeps during the 1946–47 season; for his career he averaged 0.7 points per game. He served in the United States Navy during World War II. He and his wife, Ruth Pyles Drummond, had five children.
