= Wyman Roberts =

American basketball player

Personal information
- Born: September 27, 1915 Waterloo, Ohio, U.S.
- Died: December 1, 1987 (aged 72) Columbus, Ohio, U.S.
- Listed height: 5 ft 11 in (1.80 m)
- Listed weight: 160 lb (73 kg)

Career information
- High school: Waterloo (Waterloo, Ohio)
- Position: Forward

Career history
- 1935–1937: Waterloo Wonders
- 1937: Dayton Metropolitans
- 1938–1941: Waterloo Wonders

Wyman J. Roberts (September 27, 1915 – December 1, 1987) was an American professional basketball player. He played in the National Basketball League for the Dayton Metropolitans in just two games during the 1937–38 season and averaged 3.0 points per game. In his post-basketball life, Roberts worked as a construction worker in Dayton, Ohio.
