= Jack Oxenrider =

American athlete and coach (1922–2004)

Biographical details
- Born: December 1, 1922; Des Moines, Iowa, U.S.
- Died: April 6, 2004 (aged 81)

Playing career

Football
- 1942–1945: William Penn

Basketball
- 1942–1946: William Penn
- 1947–1948: St. Joseph Outlaws

Coaching career (HC unless noted)

Football
- 1948: William Penn

Basketball
- 1948–1949: William Penn

Baseball
- 1949: William Penn

Head coaching record
- Overall: 0–6 (football); 1–18 (basketball); 2–5 (baseball)

Jack Oxenrider (December 1, 1922 – April 6, 2004) was an American football, baseball, and basketball player and coach. He played for one season with the St. Joseph Outlaws of the Professional Basketball League of America. Oxenrider served as the head football, basketball, and baseball at his alma mater, William Penn University during the 1948–49 academic year.

== Head coaching record ==
=== Football ===
Year	Team	Overall	Conference	Standing	Bowl/playoffs
William Penn Quakers (Iowa Conference) (1948)
1948	William Penn	0–6	0–4	11th	
William Penn:		0–6	0–4		
Total:		0–6			
