= Charlie Epperson =

American basketball player

Personal information
- Born: June 16, 1919
- Died: December 16, 1996 (aged 77)
- Listed height: 6 ft 1 in (1.85 m)

Career information
- High school: Pulaski (Jackson, Michigan)
- College: Wisconsin (1939–1942)
- Position: Forward

Career history
- 1941–1942, 1945–1946: Sheboygan Red Skins
- 1947–1948: Saint Joseph Outlaws

Career highlights
- NCAA champion (1941)

Charles Epperson (June 16, 1919 – December 16, 1996) was an American basketball player. He was an early professional player in the National Basketball League (which later merged with the Basketball Association of America to form the NBA). He played college basketball for the Wisconsin Badgers and was a starter on their 1941 national championship team.

Epperson, a 6'1" forward from Jackson, Michigan, played college basketball at Wisconsin for future Hall of Fame coach Bud Foster. Epperson played from 1939 to 1942 and, as a junior, was a starting forward for the Badgers' 1941 national championship team.

After the completion of his college career, Epperson played in the National Basketball League for the Sheboygan Red Skins in 1942 and 1946. He also played a season in the short-lived Professional Basketball League of America for the Saint Joseph Outlaws in 1947–48.
