= Weldon Kern =

American basketball player (1923–2014)

Personal information
- Born: April 30, 1923 Lawton, Oklahoma, U.S.
- Died: April 21, 2014 (aged 90) Shawnee, Kansas, U.S.
- Listed height: 5 ft 10 in (1.78 m)
- Listed weight: 145 lb (66 kg)

Career information
- High school: Lawton (Lawton, Oklahoma)
- College: Cameron (1942–1944); Oklahoma State (1944–1946)
- Position: Guard
- Number: 7

Career history
- 1947: Oklahoma City Drillers

Career highlights
- 2× NCAA champion (1945, 1946); First-team All-MVC (1946)

Weldon Kern (April 30, 1923 – April 21, 2014) was an American basketball player. He won two national championships at Oklahoma A&M University and was later an early professional in the Professional Basketball League of America.

Kern, a 5'10 guard from Lawton, Oklahoma, attended Oklahoma A&M from 1944–46, winning championships as a starting forward for the Aggies in both 1945 and 1946 with future Hall of Fame teammate Bob Kurland. Kern was named first team All-Missouri Valley Conference in 1946, in a year when all five Aggie starters composed the all-conference first team.

Following the completion of his collegiate career, Kern signed with the Oklahoma City Drillers in the Professional Basketball League of America, a short-lived predecessor to the National Basketball Association.

Kern died on April 21, 2014, at the age of 90.
