= Tony Kaseta =

American basketball player

Personal information
- Born: September 9, 1923 Hamtramck, Michigan, U.S.
- Died: January 19, 1995 (aged 71) Livonia, Michigan, U.S.
- Listed height: 6 ft 8 in (2.03 m)
- Listed weight: 220 lb (100 kg)

Career information
- High school: Northern (Detroit, Michigan)
- Playing career: 1946–1948
- Position: Center

Career history
- 1946–1947: Detroit Mansfields
- 1947–1948: Grand Rapids Rangers
- 1947–1948: Detroit Vagabonds
- 1948: House of David
- 1948: Detroit Vagabond Kings
- Stats at Basketball Reference

Anthony Joseph Kaseta (September 9, 1923 – January 19, 1995) was a Lithuanian-American professional basketball player. He played as a center for one season in the Professional Basketball League of America (PBLA) and one season in the National Basketball League (NBL). Kaseta was born in Michigan and during his youth lived with his mother and two older siblings in Detroit. During his career, he played for the Grand Rapids Rangers (PBLA, 1947–48) and the Detroit Vagabond Kings (NBL, 1948–49).
