= Jim Gibbs (basketball) =

American basketball player

Personal information
- Born: August 19, 1913 Mill Spring, Missouri
- Died: May 31, 2010 (aged 96) Bartlett, Tennessee
- Listed height: 6 ft 5 in (1.96 m)
- Listed weight: 195 lb (88 kg)

Career information
- College: Central Missouri (1936–1939)
- Position: Forward / center

Career history

Playing
- 1944–1945: Wichita Cessna Bobcats
- 1946: Toledo Jeeps
- 1947–1948: Flint Dow A.C.'s
- 1947–1948: Tulsa Ranchers

Coaching
- 1940–1942: Niangua HS
- 1947–1948: Tulsa Ranchers
- 1947–1966: Jefferson City HS

James Elmer Gibbs (August 19, 1913 – May 31, 2010) was an American professional basketball player. He played for the Toledo Jeeps and Flint Dow A.C.'s in the National Basketball League (NBL) and averaged 5.5 points per game. Gibbs also served as a player-coach for the Tulsa Ranchers in the Professional Basketball League of America during 1947–48.

He was the older brother of NBL player John Gibbs.
