= 1924–25 Philadelphia Sphas season =

American basketball team season

- League champions
- League: Philadelphia Basket Ball League
- Head coach: Eddie Gottlieb & Harry Passon
- General manager: Eddie Gottlieb
- Owner(s): Eddie Gottlieb; Harry Passon; Edwin "Hughie" Black
- Arena: Musical Fund Hall

Results
- Record: 23–14 (.622)
- Place: Conference: 1st (first half), 3rd (second half)
- Playoff finish: Philadelphia Basket Ball League Champions (Won 2-1 over the Tri-Council Caseys)

The 1924–25 season was the final season played by the Philadelphia Sphas while operating in what could be considered as the rebranded Philadelphia Basket Ball League, which might be the rebranded name of the original Philadelphia League (though it would be their eighth overall season of play). This season marked the franchise's first as the (technically) defending champions of the league, later playing in over 20 games in a season once again before ultimately repeating as league champions under an admittedly controversial manner. Game-by-game records are (currently) not available for this season and are therefore likely lost to time in the process. Unlike the team's final season in the original Philadelphia League, the team's first season in the Philadelphia Basket Ball League would have some dramatic differences in structure between the first half and the second half of the season. For the first half of what would be known as the Philadelphia Basket Ball League [sic], the Sphas would finish that half of the season with a first-place finish through an above-average 15–4 record in a six team league at the time (notably starting out the season with eleven straight wins in the process). However, by the time the Sphas entered the much shorter second half of the season, they would end that half of the season with a third-place finish through a below-average 8–10 record that had them be one game ahead of the Philadelphia Cathedral franchise in what would be seen as a four team league instead following the withdrawal of the local St. Henry and Kayoula franchises.

Despite the poor finish in the Philadelphia Basket Ball League's second half of the season, the Sphas would still compete in a rematch of the previous season's championship series match-up against the Tri-Council Caseys franchise. For the first game in the championship series rematch, the Sphas would blow a 19–8 halftime lead to half a seriously awful four point cold spell for the second half of the game to lose 29–23 in Game 1. By contrast, for Game 2, the Sphas would compete in a closer match with the Tri-Council Caseys, but they would ultimately avenge their Game 1 loss by having a 25–22 close finish to set-up a decisive Game 3 for the championship series. However, Game 3 would be controversially covered due to the discovery of three of the Tri-Council Caseys' key players (Tom Barlow, Lou Sugarman, and George Glasco) all ended up leaving the team to play in a series of lucrative exhibition games. Despite the pleas of league officials, the three Tri-Council Caseys ended up continuing with their planned exhibition series, which led to the Sphas being declared the league champions by default (ending the planned Game 3 with a default 2–0 final score by forfeit from the Tri-Council Caseys' end) due to the Tri-Council Caseys franchise not having enough active players to play for the deciding championship match-up and series; the failure of the Philadelphia Basket Ball League retaining those three players to decide the championship series properly would not only lead to the Philadelphia Basket Ball League folding operations for a few seasons (eventually returning as a minor league by comparison), but also was a catalyst for the eventual creation of the original American Basketball League, which was considered the first time a proper national basketball league would take effect within the United States of America.

Because the Philadelphia Basket Ball League had been the major professional basketball league for the state of Pennsylvania following the folding of the Pennsylvania State Basketball League, the Philadelphia Basket Ball League that the Sphas competed in would be regarded as a major basketball league within the city of Philadelphia, even though that moniker would only be seen as a temporary thing for them.

== Roster ==
Due to information on older (professional) basketball leagues being generally hard (if not outright impossible these days) to find for players from leagues like the Philadelphia Basket Ball League, there are bound to be more gaps and/or inaccuracies found in certain areas on the team's roster spots than usual.

1924–25 Philadelphia Sphas roster
Players

Pos.	No.	Player	Height	Weight	DOB	From
G/F		Davey Banks	5 ft 7 in (1.70 m)	155 lb (70 kg)	1901–01–04	No college
C		Bob Griebe	6 ft 2 in (1.88 m)	190 lb (86 kg)	1895–03–07	No college
C		Babe Klotz	6 ft 2 in (1.88 m)	200 lb (91 kg)	1900–10–23	Girard College
G/F		Harry Knorr	5 ft 10 in (1.78 m)	160 lb (73 kg)	1893–08–02	No college
G/F		Al Lehr	6 ft 2 in (1.88 m)	185 lb (84 kg)	1897–07–13	Temple
G/F		Doc Newman	5 ft 9 in (1.75 m)	170 lb (77 kg)	1890–02–03	No college
G/F		Chickie Passon	5 ft 7 in (1.70 m)	165 lb (75 kg)	1900–05–30	Penn
G		Lou Schneiderman	5 ft 8 in (1.73 m)	150 lb (68 kg)	1899–01–10	No college
G		Charlie Tettemer	6 ft 1 in (1.85 m)	185 lb (84 kg)	1902–04–24	No college
G/F		Fritz Weller	6 ft 2 in (1.88 m)	175 lb (79 kg)	1900–01–11	No college
F		Bob Wilson			Unknown	No college

Coaches
Head coach
- Eddie Gottlieb
- Harry Passon

Legend
- (DP) Unsigned draft pick
- (FA) Free agent
- (S) Suspended
- Injured

Note: Harry Knorr, Charlie Tettemer, Fritz Weller, and Bob Wilson were not a part of the team for one reason or another by the time they were competing in the Philadelphia Basket Ball League's championship series.

== Philadelphia Basket Ball League Standings ==
First Half
Team	Wins	Losses	Winning %
Philadelphia SPHAs	15	4	.789
Philadelphia St. Henry†	11	9	.550
Philadelphia Cathedral	9	9	.500
Philadelphia Tri-Council Caseys	8	10	.444
Philadelphia Kayoula†	7	9	.438
Philadelphia Shanahan	5	14	.263

Second Half
Team	Wins	Losses	Winning %
Philadelphia Tri-Council Caseys	11	7	.611
Philadelphia Shanahan	10	8	.556
Philadelphia SPHAs	8	10	.444
Philadelphia Cathedral	7	11	.389

† – Withdrew from the Philadelphia Basket Ball League following the conclusion of the first half of the season.

== Philadelphia Basket Ball League Championship Series ==
Philadelphia Sphas (1st Half Champions) Vs. Philadelphia Tri-Council Caseys (2nd Half Champions): Philadelphia Sphas win series 2–1.

- Game 1: The Tri-Council Caseys defeated the Sphas 23–29.
- Game 2: Sphas defeated the Tri-Council Caseys 25–22.
- Game 3: Sphas defeated the Tri-Council Caseys 2–0 via forfeiture.

The decisive third and final game of the championship series ended up resulting in a forfeit favoring the Sphas due to three of the Tri-Council Caseys leaving the team to compete in a lucrative exhibition series at hand.
