= Charlie Joachim =

American basketball player

Personal information
- Born: July 21, 1920
- Died: March 17, 2002 (aged 81)
- Listed height: 6 ft 2 in (1.88 m)
- Listed weight: 184 lb (83 kg)

Career information
- High school: East (Youngstown, Ohio)
- College: Mount Union
- Position: Guard / forward
- Number: 21

Career history
- 1946–1947: Youngstown Bears
- 1947–1948: Flint Dow A.C.'s

Charles Henry Joachim (July 21, 1920 – March 17, 2002) was an American professional basketball player who played in the National Basketball League for the Youngstown Bears and Flint Dow A.C.'s.
