= John Gibbs (basketball) =

American basketball player

Personal information
- Born: August 26, 1915 Mill Spring, Missouri
- Died: April 22, 1982 (aged 66) Poplar Bluff, Missouri
- Listed height: 6 ft 6 in (1.98 m)
- Listed weight: 190 lb (86 kg)

Career information
- College: Oklahoma State (1938–1939); Central Missouri (1939–1941)
- Position: Guard

Career history

Playing
- 1947: Flint Dow A.C.'s
- 1947–1948: Tulsa Ranchers

Coaching
- 1959–1968: Poplar Bluff HS

John Wesley Gibbs (August 26, 1915 – April 22, 1982) was an American basketball player and coach. He briefly played professional basketball for the Flint Dow A.C.'s in the National Basketball League (NBL) in two games during 1947–48. He had previously played college basketball under coach Henry Iba at Oklahoma State University–Stillwater, and at the University of Central Missouri. He later had a career as a coach at Poplar Bluff High School from 1959–1968.

He was the younger brother of NBL player Jim Gibbs.
