= Bill Coven =

American basketball player (1920–1998)

Personal information
- Born: February 16, 1920 Elyria, Ohio, U.S.
- Died: December 7, 1998 (aged 78) Lorain, Ohio, U.S.
- Listed height: 6 ft 7 in (2.01 m)
- Listed weight: 220 lb (100 kg)

Career information
- High school: Elyria (Elyria, Ohio)
- College: North Carolina; Toledo; Baldwin Wallace
- Position: Power forward / center

Career history
- 1946–1947: Rochester Royals

Wilbur Allen "Bill" Coven (February 16, 1920 – December 7, 1998) was an American professional basketball player. He played in the National Basketball League for the Rochester Royals during the 1946–47 season and averaged 1.8 points per game.
