= Jim Quinlan =

American basketball player

Personal information
- Born: May 29, 1922 Dansville, New York, U.S.
- Died: July 13, 2003 (aged 81) Wayland, New York, U.S.
- Listed height: 6 ft 4 in (1.93 m)
- Listed weight: 205 lb (93 kg)

Career information
- High school: Dansville (Dansville, New York)
- College: Canisius (1941–1943, 1945–1946)
- Position: Forward

Career history
- 1946: Rochester Royals
- 1948–1949: Wheeling Blues

James Francis Quinlan (May 29, 1922 – July 13, 2003) was an American professional basketball player. He played in the National Basketball League for the Rochester Royals in three games during the 1946–47 season. He also played for the Wheeling Blues in the All-American Basketball League during the 1948–49 season.

Born and raised in Dansville, New York, Quinlan played at Dansville High School before embarking on a collegiate career at Canisius College. He earned varsity letters during the 1941–42 and 1942–43 seasons, then had to leave school to fight in World War II. He was wounded in both legs during service while in the South Pacific. In his final season of college basketball eligibility, Quinlan returned to play for the Golden Griffins in the second half of the 1945–46 season.

In Quinlan's post-basketball career, he worked for Keebler Company Incorporated for 28 years. He died on July 13, 2003, in Wayland, New York.
