= 1923–24 Philadelphia Sphas season =

American basketball team season

- League champions
- League: Philadelphia League
- Head coach: Eddie Gottlieb & Harry Passon
- General manager: Eddie Gottlieb
- Owner(s): Eddie Gottlieb; Harry Passon; Edwin "Hughie" Black
- Arena: New Auditorium Hall

Results
- Record: 25–16 (.610)
- Place: Conference: 5th (first half), 1st (second half)
- Playoff finish: Philadelphia League Champions (Won 2-0 over the Tri-Council Caseys)

The 1923–24 season was the second and final season played by the Philadelphia Sphas while operating in the Philadelphia League (though it would be their seventh overall season of play). This season marked some notable firsts for the team, including their first season where they played in over 20 games and the team's first season where they won a proper championship in the (professional) basketball league they were playing in. Game-by-game records are (currently) not available for this season and are therefore likely lost to time in the process. For the first half of what would later become the final season of the Philadelphia League, the Sphas would finish that half of the season with an above-average 15–13 record that placed them ahead of only the Philadelphia Holy Men, the Camden Railroaders, and the Philadelphia St. Peter's franchises. However, in the much shorter second half of the season, the Sphas would end that half of the season with a first-place finish through an 11–3 record that had them one game ahead of the Philadelphia Cathedral franchise to set up the first and only time in the Philadelphia League's history where the two best teams in each half (the Philadelphia Tri-Council Caseys and the Sphas) would compete against each other in a best of three championship setting, with the winning team being crowned the official champions of the entire league this season. The championship series would end with the Sphas sweeping the Tri-Council Caseys franchise 2–0 in order to have the Sphas be crowned the official champions of the Philadelphia League in their second and final season of that league's existence before it shut down operations entirely (though it's possible it instead rebranded itself into the Philadelphia Basket Ball League following this season's end instead).

Because the Philadelphia League had grown bigger than the state-wide Pennsylvania State Basketball League during the previous season, the Philadelphia League that the Sphas competed in would once again be regarded as a major basketball league within the city of Philadelphia, even though that moniker would only be seen as a temporary thing while under that name for the league.

== Roster ==
Due to information on older (professional) basketball leagues being generally hard (if not outright impossible these days) to find for players from leagues like the Philadelphia League, there are bound to be more gaps and/or inaccuracies found in certain areas on the team's roster spots than usual.

1923–24 Philadelphia Sphas roster
Players

Pos.	No.	Player	Height	Weight	DOB	From
G/F		Davey Banks	5 ft 7 in (1.70 m)	155 lb (70 kg)	1901–01–04	No college
G		Hughie Black	5 ft 6 in (1.68 m)	155 lb (70 kg)	1897–12–09	South Philadelphia HS (PA)
G/F		Min Calhoun	5 ft 11 in (1.80 m)	170 lb (77 kg)	1900–12–06	No college
G		Rody Cooney	5 ft 8 in (1.73 m)	140 lb (64 kg)	1902–05–17	St. Francis Prep (NY)
C		Richie Deighan	6 ft 3 in (1.91 m)	195 lb (88 kg)	1900–02–03	No college
G		Eddie Gottlieb	5 ft 7 in (1.70 m)	165 lb (75 kg)	1898–09–15	Pennsylvania School of Pedagogy
G		Joe Hyde	5 ft 10 in (1.78 m)	155 lb (70 kg)	1908	No college
C		Babe Klotz	6 ft 2 in (1.88 m)	200 lb (91 kg)	1900–10–23	Girard College
G/F		Harry Knorr	5 ft 10 in (1.78 m)	160 lb (73 kg)	1893–08–02	No college
G/F		Al Lehr	6 ft 2 in (1.88 m)	185 lb (84 kg)	1897–07–13	Temple
G/F		Doc Newman	5 ft 9 in (1.75 m)	170 lb (77 kg)	1890–02–03	No college
G/F		Chickie Passon	5 ft 7 in (1.70 m)	165 lb (75 kg)	1900–05–30	Penn
G		Joe Reagan	6 ft 0 in (1.83 m)	175 lb (79 kg)	1893–11–18	No college
G/F		Charley Swartz	5 ft 10 in (1.78 m)		Unknown	No college
G		Charlie Tettemer	6 ft 1 in (1.85 m)	185 lb (84 kg)	1902–04–24	No college
G		Dave Tobey	5 ft 9 in (1.75 m)	145 lb (66 kg)	1898–05–01	Savage School for Physical Education

Coaches
Head coach
- Eddie Gottlieb
- Harry Passon

Legend
- (DP) Unsigned draft pick
- (FA) Free agent
- (S) Suspended
- Injured

In addition to these players, there was also a center with the last name of Davis (who played in four games with the team), a guard named McCann (who played in only one game with the team), and someone who had the last name of Anderson (who also played only game with the team) that were also on the team briefly as well. Not only that, but the official roster the team had for the championship series in the Philadelphia League included Davey Banks, Babe Klotz, Harry Knorr, Doc Newman, Chickie Passon, and Charlie Tettemer, with Eddie Gottlieb and Harry Passon coaching the team during that series as well.

== Philadelphia League Standings ==
First Half
Team	Wins	Losses	Winning %
Philadelphia Tri-Council Caseys	20	8	.714
Philadelphia Cathedral	17	10	.630
Philadelphia St. Peter's	17	11	.607
Philadelphia Shanahan	15	13	.536
Philadelphia SPHAs	14	13	.519
Philadelphia St. Henry	10	18	.357
Camden Railroaders	10	18	.357
Philadelphia Holy Name	8	20	.286

Second Half
Team	Wins	Losses	Winning %
Philadelphia SPHAs	11	3	.786
Philadelphia Cathedral	10	4	.714
Philadelphia St. Henry	8	5	.615
Philadelphia Tri-Council Caseys	6	7	.462
Philadelphia St. Peter's	6	8	.429
Philadelphia Shanahan	5	8	.385
Philadelphia Holy Name	3	7	.300
Camden Railroaders	3	10	.231

== Philadelphia League Championship Series ==
Philadelphia Tri-Council Caseys (1st Half Champions) Vs. Philadelphia Sphas (2nd Half Champions): Philadelphia Sphas win series 2–0.

- Game 1: Sphas defeated the Tri-Council Caseys 31–23.
- Game 2: Sphas defeated the Tri-Council Caseys 32–27.

The official box score for the second game had both the Sphas and Tri-Council Caseys playing every member of their respective starting line-ups on board without any roster changes coming into play, with Doc Newman leading the team in scoring for the Sphas in the second game with 13 of the 32 points scored on that April 3, 1924 match-up.
