= John Bosak =

American basketball player (1922–1994)

Personal information
- Born: September 9, 1922 Farrell, Pennsylvania, U.S.
- Died: December 6, 1994 (aged 72) Los Angeles, California, U.S.
- Listed height: 6 ft 3 in (1.91 m)
- Listed weight: 185 lb (84 kg)

Career information
- High school: Farrell (Farrell, Pennsylvania)
- Position: Guard

Career history
- 1946–1947: Youngstown Bears
- 1952–1953: Detroit Vagabond Kings

John Bosak (September 9, 1922 – December 6, 1994) was an American professional basketball player. He played for the Youngstown Bears in the National Basketball League during the 1946–47 season and averaged 2.4 points per game.
