= Frank Beaty =

American basketball player

Personal information
- Born: May 23, 1919 Greece, New York
- Died: November 26, 1985 (aged 66) Rochester, New York
- Listed height: 6 ft 2 in (1.88 m)
- Listed weight: 205 lb (93 kg)

Career information
- College: RIT (1938–1941)
- Position: Forward

Career history
- 1942–1943: Brockport Towners
- 1943–1944: Rochester Wings
- 1946–1947: Rochester Royals

Career highlights
- RIT Hall of Fame (1981)

Francis Joseph Beaty (May 23, 1919 – November 26, 1985) was an American professional basketball player. He played for the Rochester Royals in the National Basketball League for six games during the 1946–47 season and averaged 0.2 points per game.
