= Dick Starzyk =

American basketball player

Personal information
- Born: March 21, 1921 Chicago, Illinois, U.S.
- Died: October 6, 1990 (aged 69) Chicago, Illinois, U.S.
- Listed height: 5 ft 10 in (1.78 m)
- Listed weight: 180 lb (82 kg)

Career information
- High school: Holy Trinity (Chicago, Illinois)
- College: DePaul (1941–1943, 1945–1946)
- Position: Guard

Career history
- 1946: Buffalo Bisons
- 1947–1948: Grand Rapids Rangers

Richard Henry "Honey" Starzyk (March 1, 1921 – October 6, 1990) was an American professional basketball player. He played for the Buffalo Bisons in the National Basketball League during the 1946–47 season before they moved to Moline, Illinois to become the Tri-Cities Blackhawks for the rest of that season and averaged 1.3 points per game. He would end up joining Bob Sims as the only other Buffalo Bisons player to not join the Tri-Cities Blackhawks during their first season of existence following the Bisons' move from Buffalo, New York to what was considered the "Tri-Cities" area at the time. Starzyk also played for the Grand Rapids Rangers in the Professional Basketball League of America.
