= Glenn Schlechty =

American basketball player

Personal information
- Born: March 31, 1912 Neave, Ohio, U.S.
- Died: April 3, 1962 (aged 50) Dayton, Ohio, U.S.
- Listed height: 6 ft 6 in (1.98 m)
- Listed weight: 185 lb (84 kg)

Career information
- College: Findlay
- Position: Forward

Career history
- 1937: Dayton Metropolitans

Glenn Wesley Schlechty (March 31, 1912 – April 3, 1962) was an American professional basketball player. He played in the National Basketball League for the Dayton Metropolitans in four games during the 1937–38 season and averaged 1.8 points per game.
