= Al Negratti =

American basketball player, coach, and college athletics administrator

Biographical details
- Born: June 12, 1921
- Died: January 19, 1998 (aged 76); Green Bay, Wisconsin, U.S.

Playing career
- 1940–1943: Seton Hall
- 1945–1946: Rochester Royals
- 1946–1947: Washington Capitols
- Position: Power forward / center

Coaching career (HC unless noted)
- 1955–1967: Portland

Administrative career (AD unless noted)
- 1957–1969: Portland
- 1970–1971: Milwaukee
- 1971–1973: Merchant Marine
- 1973–1979: UC Santa Barbara
- 1980: UNLV
- 1981–1989: St. Norbert

Head coaching record
- Overall: 163–156

Albert Edward Negratti (June 12, 1921 – January 19, 1998) was an American basketball player, coach, and college athletics administrator. He played professionally for one season, 1946–47, in the Basketball Association of America (BAA) as a member of the Washington Capitols. Negratti attended Seton Hall University, where he played college basketball. Negratti served as the head basketball coach at the University of Portland from 1955 to 1967, compiling a record of 163–156. Negratti died of cancer on January 19, 1998, at his home in Green Bay, Wisconsin.

== BAA career statistics ==
Legend
GP	Games played
FG%	Field-goal percentage
FT%	Free-throw percentage
APG	Assists per game
PPG	Points per game

=== Regular season ===
Year	Team	GP	FG%	FT%	APG	PPG
1946–47	Washington	11	.188	.625	.5	2.8
Career		11	.188	.625	.5	2.8
