= Vic Siegel =

American basketball player

Personal information
- Born: August 24, 1920 Davenport, Iowa, U.S.
- Died: July 7, 2017 (aged 96) Davenport, Iowa, U.S.
- Listed height: 5 ft 10 in (1.78 m)
- Listed weight: 160 lb (73 kg)

Career information
- High school: Davenport (Davenport, Iowa)
- College: Iowa (1939–1942)
- Position: Guard

Career history
- 1946–1947: Fitchburg PAMCOs
- 1947: Tri-Cities Blackhawks

Career highlights
- Second-team All-Big Ten (1942)

Victor Arthur Siegel (August 24, 1920 – July 7, 2017) was an American professional basketball player. He played for the Tri-Cities Blackhawks in the National Basketball League during the 1946–47 season and averaged 1.4 points per game. Due to the unique status of the first season of the Tri-Cities Blackhawks as a team, Siegel would be one of nine players from the team's inaugural season to only play for the Blackhawks during that same season as opposed to either also or only playing for the Buffalo Bisons precursor team from 1946 as well.

A native of Davenport, Iowa, Siegel played college basketball for the Iowa Hawkeyes and earned varsity letters for three seasons, earning a second-team all-Big Ten Conference honor as a senior in 1941–42. He also played on the school's golf team. After college (and before his brief professional basketball career), Siegel served in the United States Coast Guard during World War II. He later worked as a factory supervisor in East Moline, Illinois, for 31 years before retiring in 1978.
