= Bob Sims (basketball, born 1915) =

American basketball player

Personal information
- Born: July 3, 1915 Plainwell, Michigan, U.S.
- Died: May 17, 1994 (aged 78) Dearborn, Michigan, U.S.
- Listed height: 6 ft 6 in (1.98 m)
- Listed weight: 220 lb (100 kg)

Career information
- College: Western Michigan (1937–1938)
- Position: Forward / center

Career history
- 1944–1945: Rochester Guards
- 1945–1946: Buffalo Knights
- 1945–1946: Baltimore Bullets
- 1946: Buffalo Bisons
- 1946–1947: Sheboygan Red Skins

Robert Helmer Sims (July 3, 1915 – May 17, 1994) was an American professional basketball player in the United States' National Basketball League. He played for the Buffalo Bisons before the team moved to Moline, Illinois to become the Tri-Cities Blackhawks, as well as the Sheboygan Red Skins during the 1946–47 season. He would end up joining Dick Starzyk as the only other Buffalo Bisons player to not join the Tri-Cities Blackhawks during their first season of existence following the Bisons' move from Buffalo, New York to what was considered the "Tri-Cities" area at the time.
