= Bill Sattler =

American basketball player

Personal information
- Born: August 9, 1916
- Died: July 11, 1971 (aged 54) Dover, Ohio, U.S.
- Listed height: 6 ft 8 in (2.03 m)
- Listed weight: 195 lb (88 kg)

Career information
- High school: Mineral City (Mineral City, Ohio)
- College: Ohio State (1937–1940)
- Playing career: 1940–1948
- Position: Center

Career history
- 1940–1941: Coschocton Buckeye Clothes
- 1946–1947: Youngstown Bears
- 1947–1948: Flint Dow A.C.'s

William Edward Sattler (August 9, 1916 – July 11, 1971) was an American professional basketball player. He played for the Youngstown Bears and Flint Dow A.C.'s in the National Basketball League and averaged 5.4 points per game. He died of a heart attack in his home on July 11, 1971, leaving behind a wife and four daughters.
