= Paul Anthony (basketball) =

American basketball player (1924–1993)

Personal information
- Born: January 23, 1924 Glassport, Pennsylvania
- Died: May 21, 1993 (aged 69) East Amherst, New York
- Listed height: 6 ft 5 in (1.96 m)
- Listed weight: 195 lb (88 kg)

Career information
- High school: Glassport (Glassport, Pennsylvania)
- College: Washington & Jefferson (1943–1944)
- Position: Forward / center

Career history
- 1943–1944: Corbetts
- 1944–1945: Gurrentz Packers
- 1945–1946: Buffalo K of C
- 1946–1948: Utica Olympics
- 1947–1948: Tri-Cities Blackhawks
- 1947–1948: Mohawk Redskins
- 1948–1949: Schenectady Packers
- 1950–1951: Erie

Paul John Anthony (January 23, 1924 – May 21, 1993) was an American professional basketball player. He played for the Tri-Cities Blackhawks in the National Basketball League for one game in each of the 1946–47 and 1947–48 seasons. Due to the unique status of the first season of the Tri-Cities Blackhawks as a team, Anthony would be one of nine players from the team's inaugural season to only play for the Blackhawks during that same season as opposed to either also or only playing for the Buffalo Bisons precursor team from 1946 as well. He competed in several other leagues as well.
