= Stan Waxman =

American basketball player (1922–2013)

Personal information
- Born: May 20, 1922
- Died: February 22, 2013 (aged 90)
- Listed height: 5 ft 11 in (1.80 m)
- Listed weight: 180 lb (82 kg)

Career information
- High school: James Madison (Brooklyn, New York)
- College: LIU Brooklyn (1941–1943, 1945–1946)
- Position: Guard

Career history

Playing
- 1946–1947: Buffalo Bisons / Tri-Cities Blackhawks
- 1947: Elizabeth Braves
- 1947: Louisville Colonels
- 1947–1948: Lancaster Roses
- 1947–1948: Lancaster
- 1947–1949: Utica Olympics
- 1949–1950: Schenectady Packers

Coaching
- 1948–1949: Utica Olympics
- 1949–1950: Utica (assistant)

Stanley Roy Waxman (May 20, 1922 – February 22, 2013) was an American professional basketball player. He played for the Buffalo Bisons later Tri-Cities Blackhawks in the National Basketball League during the 1946–47 season and averaged 7.1 points per game. Waxman would be one of eight former Buffalo Bisons players to continue playing for the team following their move from Buffalo, New York to Moline, Illinois (which represented what was called the "Tri-Cities" area at the time) to play for the Tri-Cities Blackhawks team that became the present-day Atlanta Hawks. He also played for teams in the American Basketball League, Professional Basketball League of America, the New York State Professional Basketball League, and in independent semi-pro leagues. In 1948–49, Waxman served as a player-coach for the Utica Olympics.
