= Ken Walters (basketball) =

American basketball player

Personal information
- Born: April 29, 1922 Millfield, Ohio, U.S.
- Died: February 13, 1992 (aged 69) Clearwater, Florida, U.S.
- Listed height: 6 ft 0 in (1.83 m)
- Listed weight: 170 lb (77 kg)

Career information
- College: Ohio
- NBA draft: 1947: undrafted
- Position: Guard

Career history

Playing
- 1947: Syracuse Nationals
- 1947–1948: Zanesville Pioneers
- 1948: Louisville Colonels
- 1948–1951: Hartford Hurricanes
- 1948–1949: Bristol
- 1949–1950: New Britain

Coaching
- 1952–1960: Clearwater HS

Kenneth William Walters (April 29, 1922 – February 13, 1992) was an American professional basketball player. He played in the National Basketball League for the Syracuse Nationals in one game during the 1947–48 season. His playing career spanned four total seasons, however, as he did compete in various other professional leagues of the time.

Walters moved to Clearwater, Florida where he coached Clearwater High School's basketball team and also sold insurance. He became the Clearwater City Commissioner in 1960.
