= Nick Grunzweig =

American basketball player (1918–2007)

Personal information
- Born: July 21, 1918 Buffalo, New York
- Died: February 10, 2007 (aged 88) Des Moines, Iowa
- Listed height: 6 ft 5 in (1.96 m)
- Listed weight: 215 lb (98 kg)

Career information
- High school: Canisius (Buffalo, New York)
- College: Niagara (1938–1941)
- Position: Forward / center

Career history
- 1946–1947: Buffalo Bisons / Tri-Cities Blackhawks

Nicholas John Grunzweig (July 21, 1918 – February 10, 2007) was an American professional basketball player. He played for the Buffalo Bisons (later Tri-Cities Blackhawks) in the National Basketball League during the 1946–47 season and averaged 2.8 points per game. Grunzweig would be one of eight former Buffalo Bisons players to continue playing for the team following their move from Buffalo, New York to Moline, Illinois (representing what was called the "Tri-Cities" area at the time) to play for the Tri-Cities Blackhawks team that became the present-day Atlanta Hawks.

Grunzweig served in the United States Army in both World War II and the Korean War, and spent the majority of his professional career in the military. After retirement from the military, he moved to Iowa where he worked for the Department of Human Services until retiring in 1979.
