= Jack Mills (basketball) =

American basketball player

Personal information
- Born: May 8, 1918 Youngstown, Ohio, U.S.
- Died: February 11, 2007 (aged 88) Avon, Ohio, U.S.
- Listed height: 6 ft 4 in (1.93 m)
- Listed weight: 210 lb (95 kg)

Career information
- High school: South (Youngstown, Ohio)
- College: Mount Union (1937–1940)
- Playing career: 1940–1947
- Position: Center / power forward
- Coaching career: 1945–1970

Career history

Playing
- 1941–1942: Youngstown Sheet and Tube
- 1946–1947: Youngstown Bears

Coaching
- 1945–1959: David Anderson HS
- 1963–1970: United HS

Jack Lemoyne Mills Sr. (May 8, 1918 – February 11, 2007) was an American professional basketball player. He played in the National Basketball League for the Youngstown Bears and averaged 2.3 points per game.
