= Paul Herman (basketball) =

American basketball player

Personal information
- Born: July 5, 1921 Ohio
- Died: July 20, 1972 (aged 51) Wheeling, West Virginia
- Listed height: 6 ft 1 in (1.85 m)
- Listed weight: 175 lb (79 kg)

Career information
- High school: Washington (Massillon, Ohio)
- College: Tennessee (1940–1943)
- Position: Guard

Career history
- 1946–1947: Youngstown Bears
- 1947: Flint Dow A.C.'s
- 1947–1952: Wheeling

Paul T. Herman (July 5, 1921 – July 20, 1972) was an American professional basketball player. He played in the National Basketball League for the Youngstown Bears and Flint Dow A.C.'s and averaged 5.8 points per game.
