= Al Grenert =

American basketball player

Personal information
- Born: July 8, 1919 Holyoke, Massachusetts
- Died: August 9, 2002 (aged 83) Rockport, Maine
- Listed height: 6 ft 0 in (1.83 m)
- Listed weight: 190 lb (86 kg)

Career information
- High school: Holyoke (Holyoke, Massachusetts)
- College: NYU (1941–1942, 1944–1945)
- Playing career: 1945–1949
- Position: Guard / forward

Career history

Playing
- 1945–1946: Sheboygan Red Skins
- 1946–1948: Tri-Cities Blackhawks
- 1947: Birmingham Skyhawks
- 1947–1948: Montgomery Rebels
- 1947–1948: Utica Olympics

Coaching
- 1949–1971: Saint Anselm
- 1976–1984: Nashua HS

Albert Francis Grenert (July 8, 1919 – August 9, 2002) was an American professional basketball player and college coach. He played college basketball and baseball at New York University (NYU). He played for the Sheboygan Red Skins and Tri-Cities Blackhawks in the National Basketball League, among other teams and leagues. Due to the unique status of the first season of the Tri-Cities Blackhawks as a team, Grener would be one of nine players from the team's inaugural season to only play for the Blackhawks during that same season as opposed to either also or only playing for the Buffalo Bisons precursor team from 1946 as well.

Grenert served in the U.S. Marine Corps during World War II. He also had a coaching career that lasted 30 seasons, spanning both college and high school levels.
