= Wilbur Schu =

American basketball player (1922–1980)

Personal information
- Born: December 18, 1922 Louisville, Kentucky, U.S.
- Died: November 6, 1980 (aged 57) Fayette County, Kentucky, U.S.
- Listed height: 6 ft 3 in (1.91 m)
- Listed weight: 190 lb (86 kg)

Career information
- High school: Versailles (Versailles, Kentucky)
- College: Kentucky (1943–1946)
- Position: Shooting guard / small forward

Career history
- 1946: Youngstown Bears
- 1946–1947: Tri-Cities Blackhawks

Wilbur Louis Schu (December 18, 1922 – November 6, 1980) was an American professional basketball player. He played for the Youngstown Bears and Tri-Cities Blackhawks in the National Basketball League during the 1946–47 season. He averaged 1.4 points per game.

Schu played both football and basketball at the University of Kentucky.

== Statistics ==
REGULAR SEASON RECORD
Year	Team	League	GA	FGM	FTM	FTA	PCT.	AST	PTS	AVG
1942–43	Kentucky	College	6	4	4				12	2.0
1943–44	Kentucky	College	20	52	22				126	6.3
1944–45	Kentucky	College	26	82	44				208	8.0
1945–46	Kentucky	College	26	71	58				200	7.7
1946–47	Youngstown–Tri-Cities	NBL	33	15	16	26	.615		46	1.4
Major League Totals			33	15	16	26	.615		46	1.4
