= Ed Moeller =

American basketball player (1919–2018)

Personal information
- Born: January 8, 1919 Delaware, Ohio, U.S.
- Died: November 7, 2018 (aged 99) Raleigh, North Carolina, U.S.
- Listed height: 6 ft 0 in (1.83 m)
- Listed weight: 175 lb (79 kg)

Career information
- High school: Willis (Delaware, Ohio)
- College: Ohio State (1939–1942)
- Position: Guard

Career history
- 1946–1947: Youngstown Bears
- 1947: Tri-Cities Blackhawks

Edward Wolfe Moeller (January 8, 1919 – November 7, 2018) was an American professional basketball player. He played in the National Basketball League for the Youngstown Bears and Tri-Cities Blackhawks during the 1946–47 season and averaged 1.8 points per game. Due to the unique status of the first season of the Tri-Cities Blackhawks as a team, Moeller would be one of nine players from the team's inaugural season to only play for the Blackhawks during that same season as opposed to either also or only playing for the Buffalo Bisons precursor team from 1946 as well.
