= Jim Cominsky =

American basketball player (1918–2003)

Personal information
- Born: July 28, 1918 Wheeling, West Virginia, U.S.
- Died: February 7, 2003 (aged 84) Riverside, California, U.S.
- Listed height: 6 ft 2 in (1.88 m)
- Listed weight: 185 lb (84 kg)

Career information
- High school: St. Patrick (Chicago, Illinois)
- College: DePaul (1940–1943)
- Playing career: 1944–1948
- Position: Guard

Career history
- 1944–1945: Detroit Mansfields
- 1946–1947: Rochester Royals
- 1947–1948: Grand Rapids Rangers

James John Cominsky (July 28, 1918 – February 7, 2003) was an American professional basketball player. He played for the Rochester Royals in the National Basketball League for one season and averaged 0.8 points per game. Cominsky also played for the Grand Rapids Rangers in the Professional Basketball League of America.
