= Lou Rutter =

American basketball player

Personal information
- Born: August 4, 1914 Ohio, U.S.
- Died: November 9, 1971 (aged 57) Miamisburg, Ohio, U.S.
- Listed height: 6 ft 2 in (1.88 m)
- Listed weight: 180 lb (82 kg)

Career information
- College: Otterbein (1934–1937)
- Position: Guard

Career history
- 1937: Dayton Metropolitans

Career highlights
- First-team All-OAC (1935); Second-team All-OAC (1936)

Louis Hiram Rutter (August 4, 1914 – November 9, 1971) was an American professional basketball player. He played in the National Basketball League for the Dayton Metropolitans in eight games during the 1937–38 season and averaged 10.0 points per game. Rutter also served in World War II as a ranger.
