= Bob Gauchat =

American basketball player

Personal information
- Born: March 5, 1921 New York
- Died: October 28, 1971 (aged 50) Kenmore, New York
- Listed height: 6 ft 0 in (1.83 m)
- Listed weight: 180 lb (82 kg)

Career information
- High school: Canisius HS (Buffalo, New York)
- College: Canisius (1939–1942, 1945–1946)
- Position: Guard

Career history
- 1942–1943: Rochester Seagrams
- 1943–1945: Rochester Pros
- 1945–1946: Syracuse Stars
- 1946–1947: Tri-Cities Blackhawks
- 1947: Rochester Royals
- 1946–1949: Buffalo Kobler-Millers

Leon Robert Gauchat Jr. (March 5, 1921 – October 28, 1971) was an American professional basketball player. He played for the Tri-Cities Blackhawks and the Rochester Royals in the National Basketball League spanning about one season in total. Due to the unique status of the first season of the Tri-Cities Blackhawks as a team, Gauchet would be one of nine players from the team's inaugural season to only play for the Blackhawks during that same season as opposed to either also or only playing for the Buffalo Bisons precursor team from 1946 as well. In his post-basketball career he became a dentist.
