= Frank Shannon (basketball) =

American basketball player and coach

Personal information
- Born: November 25, 1917 Parkersburg, West Virginia, U.S.
- Died: December 20, 2005 (aged 88) Delaware, Ohio, U.S.
- Listed height: 5 ft 11 in (1.80 m)
- Listed weight: 180 lb (82 kg)

Career information
- High school: Springfield (Springfield, Ohio)
- College: Wittenberg (1937–1940)
- Position: Guard
- Coaching career: 1946–1979

Career history

Playing
- 1946–1947: Youngstown Bears
- 1946–1948: Dayton Metropolitans

Coaching
- 1946–1947: Youngstown Bears
- 1947–1951: Olive Branch HS
- 1951–1955: Tecumseh HS
- 1955–1958: Urbana HS
- 1958–1979: Ohio Wesleyan

Frank Emerson Shannon (November 25, 1917 – December 20, 2005) was an American professional basketball player. He served as a player-coach for the Youngstown Bears in the National Basketball League during the 1946–47 season. Shannon was also a long-time high school and college coach in Ohio, serving at several different high schools as well as Ohio Wesleyan University.
