= Howie Rader =

American basketball player

Personal information
- Born: March 29, 1921 Brooklyn, New York, U.S.
- Died: February 2, 1991 (aged 69) El Paso, Texas, U.S.
- Listed height: 6 ft 1 in (1.85 m)
- Listed weight: 190 lb (86 kg)

Career information
- High school: James Madison (Brooklyn, New York)
- College: LIU Brooklyn (1941–1944)
- Playing career: 1944–1950
- Position: Shooting guard / small forward
- Number: 8

Career history
- 1944–1945: Philadelphia Sphas
- 1946–1948: Buffalo Bisons / Tri-Cities Blackhawks
- 1947–1948: Atlanta Crackers
- 1948–1949: Baltimore Bullets
- 1949–1950: Hartford Hurricanes

Career highlights
- ABL champion (1945)
- Stats at NBA.com
- Stats at Basketball Reference

Howard Rader (March 29, 1921 – February 2, 1991) was an American professional basketball player who played two seasons in the National Basketball League (NBL) and one season in the Basketball Association of America (BAA). During his only season in the American Basketball League and his first season in the NBL, he played alongside his brother Len Rader as members of both the Philadelphia Sphas and the Buffalo Bisons turned Tri-Cities Blackhawks. Howie and his twin brother, Len, were two out of eight players from the original Buffalo Bisons NBL team from 1946 that ended up moving from Buffalo, New York to Moline, Illinois (as a part of what was called the "Tri-Cities" area at the time) to become the Tri-Cities Blackhawks that became the present-day Atlanta Hawks. After his brother signed with the Hammond Calumet Buccaneers for the final NBL season, Howie Rader ended up moving to the second ever NBA Finals champions of the time, the Baltimore Bullets, in the rivaling Basketball Association of America due to the NBL banning players that jumped to the short-lived Professional Basketball League of America at the time. In the BAA, he played for the Baltimore Bullets during the 1948–49 season. He attended Long Island University.

== BAA career statistics ==
Legend
| GP | Games played |
| FG% | Field-goal percentage |
| FT% | Free-throw percentage |
| APG | Assists per game |
| PPG | Points per game |

=== Regular season ===
| Year | Team | GP | FG% | FT% | APG | PPG |
|---|---|---|---|---|---|---|
| 1948–49 | Baltimore | 13 | .156 | .300 | 1.1 | 1.3 |
| Career | | 13 | .156 | .300 | 1.1 | 1.3 |
