= Waterloo Junior/Senior High School =

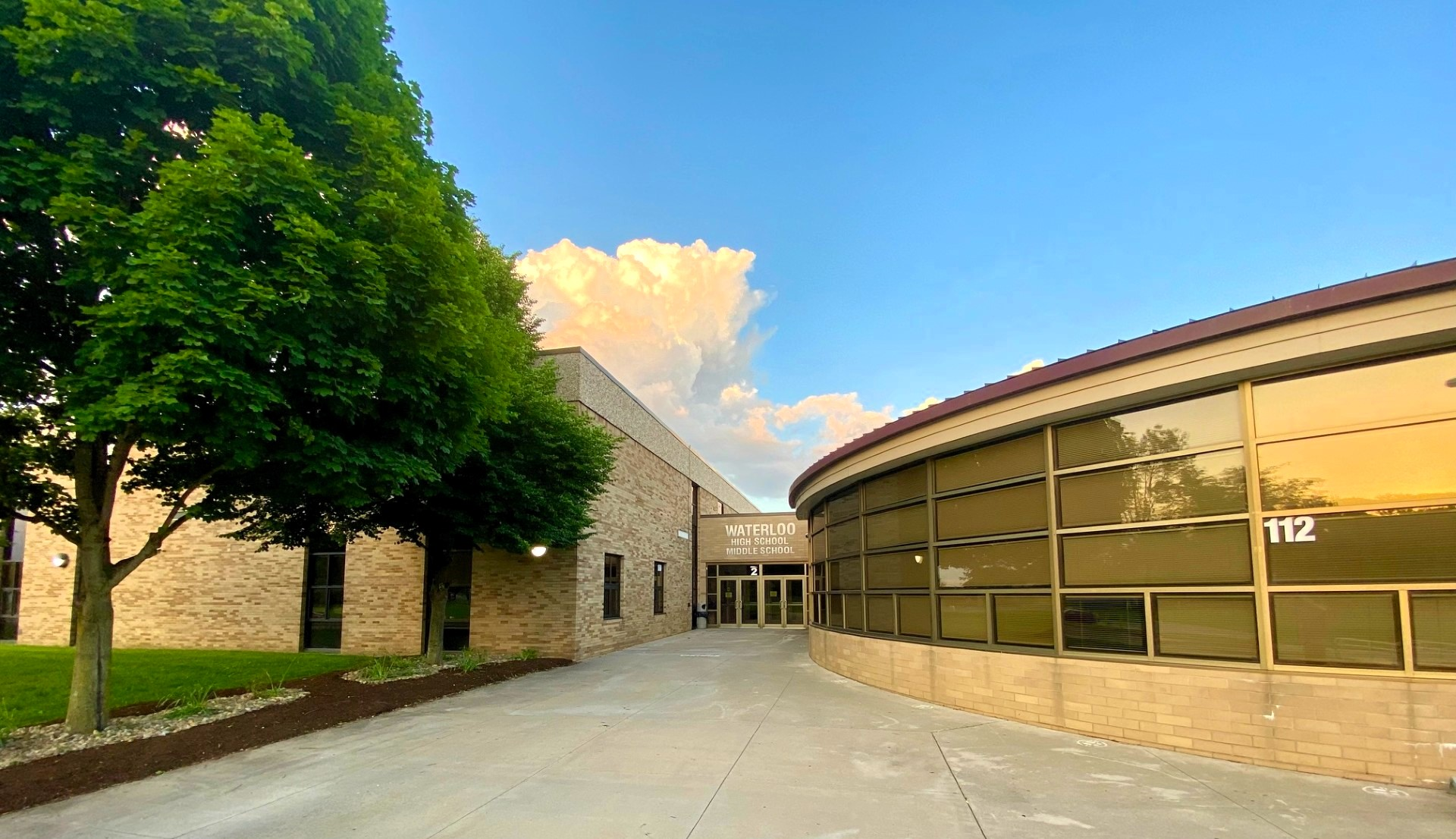

Location
- 1464 Industry Road; Atwater, Ohio 44201; United States; 41°01′42.5″N 81°11′37.9″W

Information
- Type: Public
- Established: 1967
- School district: Waterloo Local School District
- CEEB code: 364330
- NCES School ID: 390492403542
- Principal: Tyler Vallinger
- Teaching staff: 24.00 (FTE) (Note: Enrollment, teacher, and ratio totals are the combined totals of Waterloo High School and Waterloo Middle School prior to their merge)
- Grades: 7–12
- Enrollment: 334 (2024–25)
- Student to teacher ratio: 13.92
- Campus type: Rural fringe
- Colors: Burgundy and white
- Athletics conference: Mahoning Valley Athletic Conference
- Team name: Vikings
- Rival: Rootstown Rovers
- Accreditation: Ohio Department of Education
- Website: www.viking.portage.k12.oh.us/jr-sr-high-school

Waterloo Junior/Senior High School is a public junior high and high school in Atwater Township, Ohio, United States. It is the only junior high and high school in the Waterloo Local School District. Athletic teams compete as the Waterloo Vikings in the Ohio High School Athletic Association as a member of the Mahoning Valley Athletic Conference.

== History ==
The school was founded in 1967 from the merger of the former Atwater and Randolph High Schools. The Waterloo school district was created two years earlier through the merger of the Atwater and Randolph districts on October 15, 1965. The name Waterloo was chosen on October 18, 1965. The Viking mascot as well as the school colors of burgundy and white were voted on by the student bodies of both schools in October 1966 from 6 entries, three coming from each school. The building on Industry Road opened in September 1968 and was finished & dedicated on January 26, 1969.

== Athletics ==
Waterloo High School currently offers:

- Baseball
- Basketball
- Cheerleading
- Cross Country
- Golf
- Football
- Soccer
- Softball
- Track and field
- Volleyball
- Wrestling

== Notable alumni ==
- Nicolai Firtha - former professional boxer
