= Waterloo, Ohio =

Unincorporated community in Ohio, U.S.

Coordinates: 38°42′05″N 82°28′26″W

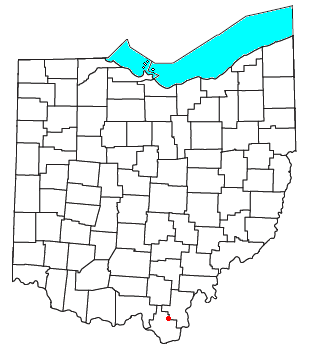
Location of Waterloo, Ohio

Waterloo is an unincorporated community in southeastern Symmes Township, Lawrence County, Ohio, United States, along Symmes Creek. It has a post office with the ZIP code 45688. Waterloo, Ohio is also noteworthy for having produced the Waterloo Wonders, who carried Ohio's Class B championship in basketball for both 1934 and 1935.

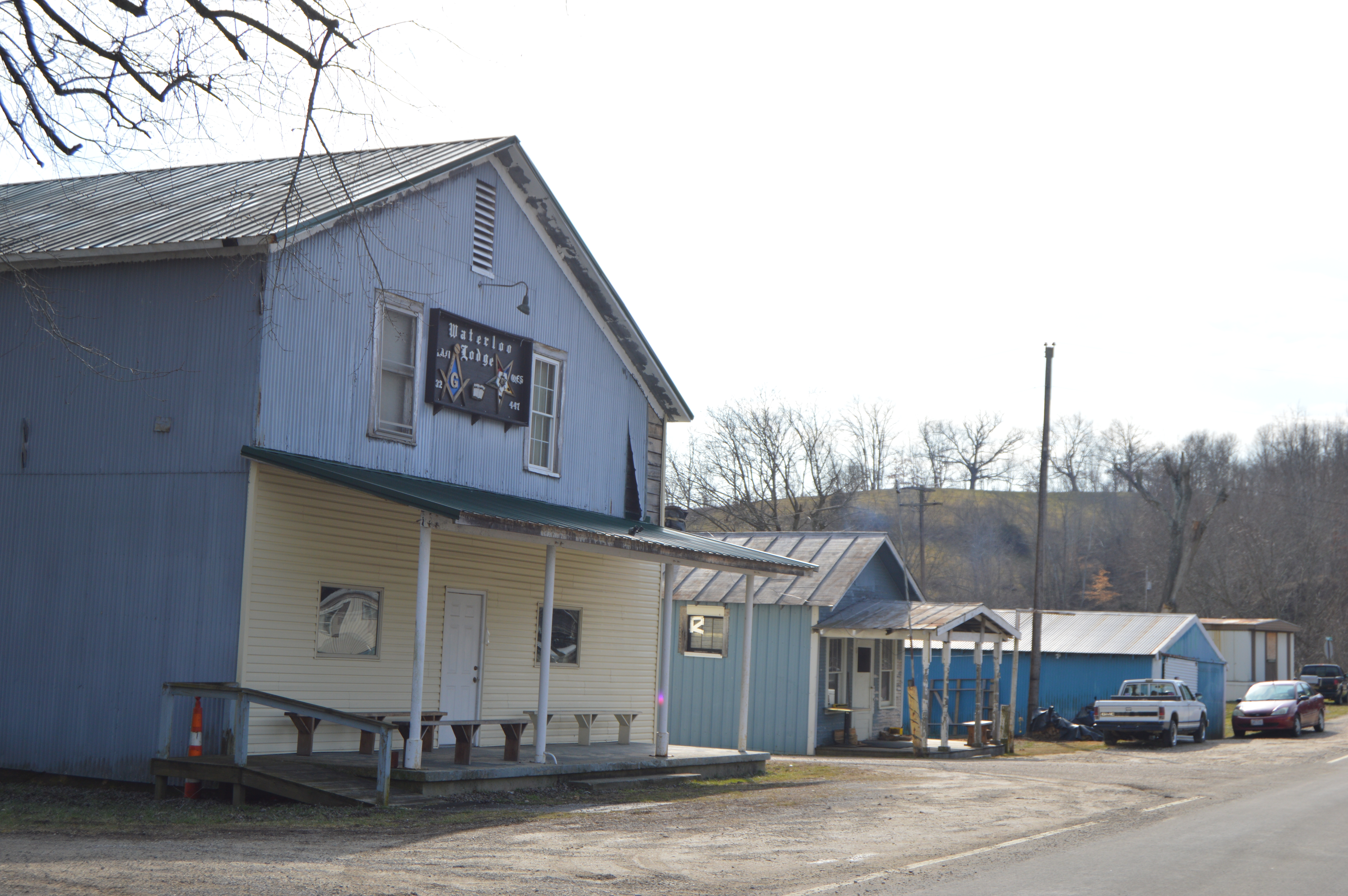
Along State Route 141

== Notable person ==
- Mary Grizzle, Florida legislator
