= Louisville Colonels (PBLA) =

Louisville Colonels (PBLA) were a team in the Professional Basketball League of America, and the first professional basketball team to play in Louisville, Kentucky.

There were 16 teams in the PBLA when it began play in 1947. The Colonels' first game, on October 30, 1947, was a 57–36 loss on the road to the Springfield Squires. The team's November 1, 1947 home opener was a 51–49 loss to the New Orleans Hurricanes. November 6, 1947 saw the team's first win, a 57–49 win at home against the Grand Rapids Rangers. The very next day Louisville played in Chicago, Illinois and managed a 60–48 win against the Omaha Tomahawks; the game would prove to be the franchise's final victory.

The Colonels, competing in the PBLA's Northern Division, finished with a record of 2 wins and 4 losses, five games behind the first place Chicago Gears. The entire league did not make it through the entire season, folding in 1948 due to competition from the Basketball Association of America, the National Basketball League and the American Basketball League.

Professional basketball returned to Louisville two years later with the Louisville Alumnites of the National Professional Basketball League.

== See also ==
- Sports in Louisville, Kentucky
