= Len Rader =

American basketball player

Personal information
- Born: March 29, 1921 Brooklyn, New York, U.S.
- Died: December 29, 1996 (aged 75) Margate, Florida, U.S.
- Listed height: 6 ft 1 in (1.85 m)
- Listed weight: 185 lb (84 kg)

Career information
- High school: James Madison (Brooklyn, New York)
- College: LIU Brooklyn (1941–1944)
- Playing career: 1944–1950
- Position: Shooting guard / small forward

Career history

Playing
- 1943–1944: Long Island Wonder Team
- 1944–1945: Philadelphia Sphas
- 1946–1947: Buffalo Bisons / Tri-Cities Blackhawks
- 1947: Troy Celtics
- 1947–1948: Birmingham Skyhawks
- 1947–1949: Montgomery Rebels
- 1948–1949: Hammond Calumet Buccaneers
- 1949–1950: Hartford Hurricanes

Coaching
- 1947–1949: Montgomery Rebels

Career highlights
- ABL champion (1945)

Leonard Rader (March 29, 1921 – December 29, 1996) was an American professional basketball player. He played for the Buffalo Bisons later Tri-Cities Blackhawks and Hammond Calumet Buccaneers in the National Basketball League and averaged 3.6 points per game.

His twin brother is Howie Rader, who also played professional basketball while with both the Philadelphia Sphas and the Buffalo Bisons turned Tri-Cities Blackhawks. Len and his twin brother, Howie, were two out of eight players from the original Buffalo Bisons NBL team from 1946 that ended up moving from Buffalo, New York to Moline, Illinois (as a part of what was called the "Tri-Cities" area at the time) to become the Tri-Cities Blackhawks that became the present-day Atlanta Hawks.
