= List of undrafted NBA players =

The National Basketball Association (NBA) holds an annual draft where teams select eligible players to join the league. While most NBA players are drafted, undrafted players occasionally earn roster spots as well. Sometimes, they even outperform more celebrated draft picks. The number of rounds in the draft has evolved since the first one in 1947. The 1960 and 1968 drafts were 21 rounds, before settling at 10 rounds by 1974 (in 1977, however, the draft was held in eight); it was reduced to seven rounds in 1985. After negotiations with the National Basketball Players Association, the draft has been two rounds since 1989, leaving undrafted players free to negotiate with any team.

Unlike with American football in the National Football League (NFL), undrafted players are less likely to become recognizable stars in the NBA. Only one modern-day undrafted player has been elected to the Naismith Memorial Basketball Hall of Fame—Ben Wallace in 2021. (Note: Generally not included are: Inducted players whose careers began in the 1950s or earlier, e.g. George Mikan played with the Chicago American Gears of the National Basketball League in 1946 (before the NBA draft existed) before being assigned to the Minneapolis Lakers in 1947 due to the Chicago team folding from that league.; Connie Hawkins, who was assigned to the Phoenix Suns in 1969 due to winning a coin flip over the Seattle SuperSonics after he was not allowed to enter the league due to alleged college rule violations; Don Barksdale, inducted as a contributor to the sport by breaking racial barriers as a player; Moses Malone, who began in the American Basketball Association (ABA) after being selected in the 1974 ABA draft before entering the NBA through the ABA dispersal draft in 1976) The first undrafted player to be voted an NBA All-Star starter in 2003, Wallace played the most career games of any undrafted player with 1,088 games played in 15 seasons, won an NBA championship, was a four-time All-Star, and was a four-time winner of the NBA Defensive Player of the Year Award.

Other undrafted players who have made significant contributions include John Starks who was the first undrafted player in the modern era to become an All-Star in 1994. Udonis Haslem became the first undrafted player to lead a franchise (Miami) in career rebounds in 2012, and he was a member of each of the Heat's three championship teams. Bruce Bowen played 13 seasons in the NBA, was selected to the NBA All-Defensive Team eight times, and was a key contributor on three San Antonio Spurs championship teams. David Wesley scored 11,842 points in a 14-year NBA career, and retired as the highest-scoring undrafted player of the modern era. Mike James from the 1998 draft was the first undrafted player to average 20 points in a season (20.3) in 2006. Jorge Garbajosa was the first to be named All-Rookie First Team in 2007. Undrafted in the 2016 draft, Fred VanVleet holds the single-game scoring record for an undrafted player with 54 points on February 2, 2021. Troy Hudson, who enjoyed an 11-year NBA career after being passed over in the 1997 draft, alluded to his rise in his 2007 album Undrafted.

== List of undrafted players ==
The following players were undrafted in the specified year, but later played in at least one official regular season or playoff game in their career.

Draft	Player	Pos.	Nationality	School/club team
1947	Don Barksdale	PF/C	United States	UCLA (Fr.)
1947	Charles Black	PF/C	United States	Kansas (Sr.)
1947	Harry Boykoff	C	United States	St. John's (Jr.)
1947	Carl Braun	G	United States	Colgate (So.)
1947	Bill Calhoun	SG/SF	United States	San Francisco Junior College (Sr.)
1947	Fran Curran	PG	United States	Notre Dame (Jr.)
1947	Jack Dwan	SG/SF	United States	Loyola (Illinois) (Sr.)
1947	Hoot Gibson	PF/C	United States	Creighton (So.)
1947	Ralph Hamilton	SG/SF	United States	Indiana (Jr.)
1947	John Hargis	SG/SF	United States	Texas (Jr.)
1947	Doug Holcomb	SF/PF	United States	Wisconsin (So.)
1947	Boag Johnson	PG	United States	Huntington (Sr.)
1947	Johnny Jorgensen	SG/SF	United States	DePaul (Sr.)
1947	Walt Kirk	SG/SF	United States	Illinois (Sr.)
1947	Bob Knight	SG/SF	United States	Weaver (Connecticut) (HS Sr.)
1947	Ray Kuka	SF	United States	Montana State (Jr.)
1947	Walt Lautenbach	SG/SF	United States	Wisconsin (Jr.)
1947	Matt Mazza	SG/SF	United States	Michigan State (So.)
1947	Dick Mehen	PF/C	United States	Tennessee (Jr.)
1947	Carl Meinhold	SG/SF	United States	Long Island (So.)
1947	Ken Menke	SG	United States	Illinois (Jr.)
1947	Paul Noel	SF/PF	United States	Kentucky (Fr.)
1947	Gene Ollrich	PF	United States	Drake (Sr.)
1947	Les Pugh	PF/C	United States	Ohio State (So.)
1947	Ray Ramsey	SG/SF	United States	Bradley (Sr.)
1947	Lee Robbins	G	United States	Colorado (Sr.)
1947	Gene Rock	PG	United States	USC (Jr.)
1947	Jack Rocker	PF/C	United States	California (Sr.)
1947	Jim Springer	C	United States	Canterbury College (Indiana) (Jr.)
1947	Jack Smiley	SG/SF	United States	Illinois (Sr.)
1947	Sid Tanenbaum	SG/SF	United States	NYU (Sr.)
1947	Mike Todorovich	PF/C	United States	Wyoming (Sr.)
1947	Jack Toomay	PF/C	United States	Pacific (Sr.)
1947	Floyd Volker	PF/C	United States	Wyoming (Sr.)
1947	Danny Wagner	PG	United States	Texas (Sr.)
1948	Don Asmonga	G	United States	Alliance (So.)
1948	Jake Bornheimer	PF/C	United States	Muhlenberg (So.)
1948	Bob Brannum	PF/C	United States	Michigan State (Jr.)
1948	Jim Browne	C	United States	Tilden Tech (Illinois) (HS Sr.)
1948	Joe Colone	SF	United States	Bloomsburg State (Sr.)
1948	Jack Cotton	PF/C	United States	Wyoming (Sr.)
1948	Dillard Crocker	SG/SF	United States	Western Michigan (Fr.)
1948	Ray Ellefson	PF/C	United States	Oklahoma A&M (Sr.)
1948	Jack Eskridge	PF/C	United States	Kansas (Jr.)
1948	Phil Farbman	PG	United States	CCNY (Sr.)
1948	Donnie Forman	PG	United States	NYU (Sr.)
1948	Joe Graboski	PF/C	United States	Tuley (Illinois) (HS Sr.)
1948	John Hazen	PG	United States	Indiana State (So.)
1948	Gene James	SF/PF	United States	Marshall (Jr.)
1948	Neil Johnston	C	United States	Ohio State (So.)
1948	Lionel Malamed	PG	United States	CCNY (Sr.)
1948	Jack McCloskey	PG	United States	Penn (Sr.)
1948	Bill Miller	SG/SF	United States	North Carolina (So.)
1948	Dave Minor	G	United States	UCLA (Jr.)
1948	Fred Paine	SF	United States	Westminster (Pennsylvania) (Sr.)
1948	Jim Spruill	SG	United States	Rice (Fr.)
1949	Edward Bartels	SG/SF	United States	NC State (Jr.)
1949	Vince Boryla	SF/PF	United States	Denver (Sr.)
1949	Joe Bradley	SG	United States	Oklahoma A&M (Sr.)
1949	Bob Brown	SF	United States	Miami (Ohio) (Sr.)
1949	Leroy Chollet	SG/SF	United States	Canisius (Sr.)
1949	Joe Dolhon	PG	United States	NYU (Jr.)
1949	George Feigenbaum	PG	United States	Long Island (So.)
1949	Normie Glick	SF/PF	United States	Marymount (So.)
1949	Al Guokas	SG/SF	United States	Saint Joseph's (So.)
1949	Bob Hahn	C	United States	NC State (Sr.)
1949	Bob Harrison	PG	United States	Michigan (Sr.)
1949	Bill Herman	SG	United States	Mount Union (Sr.)
1949	Howie Janotta	SF	United States	Seton Hall (Sr.)
1949	Frank Kudelka	SG/SF	United States	Saint Mary's (California) (Jr.)
1949	Mal McMullen	PF/C	United States	Xavier (Jr.)
1949	Al Miksis	C	United States	Western Illinois (Sr.)
1949	Dermie O'Connell	PG	United States	Holy Cross (So.)
1949	Mike O'Neill	SG/SF	United States	California (Sr.)
1949	Charlie Parsley	SG	United States	Western Kentucky (Sr.)
1949	John Payak	SG	United States	Bowling Green (Sr.)
1949	Jack Phelan	SG/SF	United States	DePaul (Sr.)
1949	Marv Schatzman	SF/PF	United States	Saint Louis (So.)
1949	Wayne See	SG	United States	Northern Arizona (Sr.)
1949	Paul Walther	G	United States	Tennessee (Sr.)
1949	Isaac Walthour	PG	United States	Benjamin Franklin (New York) (HS Sr.)
1949	Bob Wood	PG	United States	Northern Illinois (Sr.)
1950	Ed Earle	SG/SF	United States	Loyola (Illinois) (Sr.)
1950	Al Masino	PG	United States	Canisius (Sr.)
1950	Andy O'Donnell	PG/SG	United States	Loyola (Maryland) (Sr.)
1950	Bob Wilson	SG/SF	United States	West Virginia State (Sr.)
1951	Jerry Fowler	C	United States	Missouri (Sr.)
1951	John O'Boyle	SG	United States	Colorado State (Sr.)
1952	Pete Darcey	C	United States	Oklahoma A&M (Sr.)
1952	Danny Finn	G	United States	St. John's (Sr.)
1952	Don Hanrahan	F	United States	Loyola (Illinois) (Sr.)
1952	Don Henriksen	PF/C	United States	California (Sr.)
1952	Bucky McConnell	PG	United States	Marshall (Sr.)
1952	Jim Mooney	SF	United States	Villanova (Jr.)
1952	Bob Naber	SG/SF	United States	Louisville (Sr.)
1952	Sherwin Raiken	SG	United States	Villanova (Sr.)
1953	Rollen Hans	SG	United States	LIU Brooklyn (Sr.)
1953	McCoy Ingram	PF	United States	Jackson State (Sr.)
1953	Jackie Moore	F	United States	La Salle (So.)
1953	Al Roges	SG/SF	United States	LIU Brooklyn (Sr.)
1953	Hal Uplinger	SG	United States	LIU Brooklyn (Sr.)
1953	Bob Williams	SF	United States	Florida A&M (Sr.)
1954	Fred Christ	SG/SF	United States	Fordham (Sr.)
1954	Andy Johnson	SG/SF	United States	Portland (Sr.)
1954	Dan King	F	United States	Western Kentucky (Sr.)
1954	Worthy Patterson	G	United States	Connecticut (Sr.)
1955	Rich Eichhorst	G	United States	Southeast Missouri State (Sr.)
1955	Chris Harris	SG	United Kingdom; England	Dayton (Sr.)
1955	Med Park	SG/SF	United States	Missouri (Sr.)
1958	Stacey Arceneaux	SG	United States	Iowa State (Sr.)
1958	Whitey Bell	PG	United States	NC State (Sr.)
1960	George Lehmann	G	United States	Campbell (Fr.)
1961	Ed Burton	SF	United States	Michigan State (Sr.)
1962	Dan Tieman	PG	United States	Thomas More (Sr.)
1962	Ralph Wells	PG	United States	Northwestern (Sr.)
1962	Art Williams	PG	United States	Cal Poly Pomona (Fr.)
1963	Bob Hogsett	PF	United States	Tennessee (Sr.)
1963	Bob Warlick	SG	United States	Pepperdine (Sr.)
1964	Connie Hawkins	PF/C	United States	Iowa (Fr.)
1964	Steve Jones	SG	United States	Oregon (Sr.)
1965	Jay Miller	SF	United States	Notre Dame (Sr.)
1966	Bud Acton	SF	United States	Hillsdale (Sr.)
1966	Bill Dinwiddie	F	United States	New Mexico Highlands (Sr.)
1966	Dennis Hamilton	PF	United States	Arizona State (Sr.)
1967	Tyrone Britt	G	United States	Johnson C. Smith (Sr.)
1967	Al Jackson	SF	United States	Wilberforce (Sr.)
1967	Craig Spitzer	C	United States	Tulane (Sr.)
1967	Doug Sims	F	United States	Kent State (Sr.)
1968	Cliff Williams	SG	United States	Bowling Green (Sr.)
1969	Moe Barr	SG	United States	Duquesne (Sr.)
1969	A. W. Holt	SF	United States	Jackson State (Sr.)
1969	Gary Suiter	PF	United States	Midwestern State (Sr.)
1969	Bobby Washington	PG	United States	Eastern Kentucky (Sr.)
1970	Charlie Criss	PG	United States	New Mexico State (Sr.)
1970	Vester Marshall	SF	United States	Oklahoma (Sr.)
1970	Jeff Webb	SG	United States	Kansas State (Sr.)
1970	Harthorne Wingo	SF	United States	Friendship College (Sr.)
1972	Paul McCracken	SG	United States	Cal State Northridge (Sr.)
1973	Al Carlson	C	United States	Oregon (Jr.)
1973	Henry Dickerson	G	United States	Morris Harvey (Sr.)
1973	Slick Watts	G	United States	Xavier (Louisiana) (Sr.)
1975	Mel Bennett	PF	United States	Pittsburgh (Fr.)
1975	Robin Jones	PF	United States	Saint Louis (Sr.)
1975	Irv Kiffin	SF	United States	Oklahoma Baptist (Sr.)
1975	Mark Olberding	F	United States	Minnesota (Fr.)
1978	Del Beshore	PG	United States	California (Pennsylvania) (Sr.)
1978	Mike Davis	C	United States	Maryland (Sr.)
1978	Rock Lee	PF/C	United States	San Diego State (Sr.)
1978	Myles Patrick	F	United States	Auburn (Sr.)
1978	Sam Pellom	F	United States	Buffalo (Sr.)
1978	Jim Zoet	C	Canada	Lakehead (Sr.)
1979	Norman Black	SG/SF	United States	Saint Joseph's (Sr.)
1979	Alan Hardy	SG/SF	United States	Michigan (Sr.)
1979	Bill Mayfield	SF	United States	Iowa (Sr.)
1980	Jim Brogan	SG/SF	United States	West Virginia Wesleyan (Sr.)
1981	Jerome Henderson	PF/C	United States	New Mexico (Sr.)
1981	Ron Cavenall	C	United States	Texas Southern (Sr.)
1985	David Cooke	PF	United States	Saint Mary's (Sr.)
1985	Dennis Nutt	PG	United States	TCU (Sr.)
1985	João Vianna	F	Brazil	Clube Atlético Monte Líbano (Brazil)
1986	Robert Rose	G	United States; Australia	George Mason (Sr.)
1986	Andre Spencer	SF	United States	Northern Arizona (Sr.)
1986	Kelvin Upshaw	PG	United States	Utah (Sr.)
1986	Stojko Vranković	C	Yugoslavia; Croatia	KK Zadar (Yugoslavia)
1987	Randy Allen	F	United States	Florida State (Sr.)
1987	Sergei Bazarevich	SG	Soviet Union; Russia; Greece	CSKA Moscow (Soviet Union)
1987	Scott Brooks	PG	United States	UC Irvine (Sr.)
1987	Mike Champion	PF	United States	Gonzaga (Sr.)
1987	Tom Copa	C	United States	Marquette (Sr.)
1987	Radisav Ćurčić	C	Yugoslavia; Serbia; Israel	Union Olimpija (Yugoslavia)
1987	Cedric Hunter	PG	United States	Kansas (Sr.)
1987	Mark Wade	PG	United States	UNLV (Sr.)
1987	David Wood	F	United States	Nevada (Sr.)
1987	A. J. Wynder	PG	United States	Fairfield (Sr.)
1988	Lloyd Daniels	SF	United States	Mt. San Antonio College (Fr.)
1988	Wayne Engelstad	PF	United States	UC Irvine (Sr.)
1988	Duane Ferrell	SF	United States	Georgia Tech (Sr.)
1988	Ben Gillery	C	United States	Georgetown (Sr.)
1988	Henry James	F	United States	St. Mary's (Texas) (Sr.)
1988	Avery Johnson	PG	United States	Southern (Sr.)
1988	Bill Jones	PF	United States	Iowa (Sr.)
1988	Tim Legler	SG	United States	La Salle (Sr.)
1988	Carlton McKinney	SG	United States	SMU (Sr.)
1988	Tracy Moore	SG/SF	United States	Tulsa (Sr.)
1988	Richard Morton	PG	United States	Cal State Fullerton (Sr.)
1988	Žarko Paspalj	SF	Yugoslavia; Serbia	Partizan Belgrade (Yugoslavia)
1988	Ramón Rivas	C	Puerto Rico	Temple (Sr.)
1988	John Starks	SG	United States	Oklahoma State (Sr.)
1988	Henry Turner	SG/SF	United States	Cal State Fullerton (Sr.)
1988	Gary Voce	PF	United States	Notre Dame (Sr.)
1988	Kennard Winchester	SG/SF	United States	Averett (Sr.)
1989	Raymond Brown	PF	United States	Idaho (Sr.)
1989	Torgeir Bryn	PF/C	Norway	Texas State (Sr.)
1989	Steve Bucknall	SG/SF	United Kingdom; England	North Carolina (Sr.)
1989	Adrian Caldwell	PF	United States	Lamar (Jr.)
1989	Chris Childs	SG	United States	Boise State (Sr.)
1989	Lanard Copeland	SG	United States; Australia	Georgia State (Sr.)
1989	Terry Davis	PF/C	United States	Virginia Union (Sr.)
1989	Tony Dawson	SF	United States	Florida State (Sr.)
1989	Byron Dinkins	PG	United States	Charlotte (Sr.)
1989	Aleksandar Đorđević	SG	Yugoslavia; Serbia	Partizan Belgrade (Yugoslavia)
1989	Terry Dozier	F	United States	South Carolina (Sr.)
1989	Andrew Gaze	SF	Australia	Seton Hall (Sr.)
1989	Paul Graham	SG/SF	United States	Ohio (Sr.)
1989	Alvin Heggs	SF	United States	Texas (Sr.)
1989	Mike Higgins	PF	United States	Northern Colorado (Sr.)
1989	Tom Hovasse	SF/PF	United States	Penn State (Sr.)
1989	Jaren Jackson	SG	United States	Georgetown (Sr.)
1989	Eric Johnson	PG	United States; Spain	Nebraska (Sr.)
1989	Thomas Jordan	PF	United States	Oklahoma State (So.)
1989	Stan Kimbrough	PG	United States	Xavier (Sr.)
1989	Jeff Lebo	SG	United States	North Carolina (Sr.)
1989	Clifford Lett	G	United States	Florida (Sr.)
1989	Mel McCants	F	United States	Purdue (Sr.)
1989	Charles Smith	PG/SG	United States	Georgetown (Sr.)
1989	Jay Taylor	SG/SF	United States	Eastern Illinois (Sr.)
1989	Leonard Taylor	PF	United States	California (Sr.)
1989	Gundars Vētra	SG/SF	Soviet Union; Latvia	VEF Rīga (Soviet Union)
1989	Howard Wright	SF/PF	United States	Stanford (Sr.)
1990	Keith Askins	SG/SF	United States	Alabama (Sr.)
1990	Cedric Ball	SF	United States	UNC Charlotte (Sr.)
1990	David Benoit	SF	United States	Alabama (Sr.)
1990	Mark Bradtke	C	Australia	Adelaide 36ers (Australia)
1990	Matt Bullard	PF	United States	Iowa (Sr.)
1990	Rick Calloway	SG/SF	United States	Indiana (Sr.)
1990	Richard Coffey	SG/SF	United States	Minnesota (Sr.)
1990	Marty Conlon	PF/C	United States; Ireland	Providence (Sr.)
1990	Michael Curry	SG/SF	United States	Georgia Southern (Sr.)
1990	Dan Godfread	C	United States	Providence (Sr.)
1990	Andrés Guibert	PF/C	Cuba	Cantera Instituto Manuel Fajardo (Cuba)
1990	Tony Harris	SG	United States	New Orleans (Sr.)
1990	Skeeter Henry	SG	United States	Oklahoma (Sr.)
1990	Brian Howard	SF	United States	NC State (Sr.)
1990	Kurk Lee	PG	United States	Towson State (Sr.)
1990	Ian Lockhart	PF	Bahamas	Tennessee (Sr.)
1990	Tharon Mayes	SG	United States	Florida State (Sr.)
1990	Chris Munk	SF/PF	United States	USC (Sr.)
1990	Melvin Newbern	SG	United States	Minnesota (Sr.)
1990	Dan O'Sullivan	C	United States; Ireland	Fordham (Sr.)
1990	Alan Ogg	C	United States	UAB (Sr.)
1990	Anthony Pullard	PF/C	United States	McNeese State (Sr.)
1990	Eldridge Recasner	PG	United States	Washington (Sr.)
1990	Larry Robinson	PG/SG	United States	Centenary (Sr.)
1990	Irving Thomas	PF	United States	Florida State (Sr.)
1990	Stephen Thompson	SG	United States	Syracuse (Sr.)
1990	Andy Toolson	SG/SF	United States	BYU (Sr.)
1990	Scott Williams	PF/C	United States	North Carolina (Sr.)
1991	Darrell Armstrong	PG	United States	Fayetteville State (Sr.)
1991	James Blackwell	PG	United States	Dartmouth (Sr.)
1991	Walter Bond	SG	United States	Minnesota (Sr.)
1991	Demetrius Calip	PG	United States	Michigan (Sr.)
1991	John Crotty	SG/SF	United States	Virginia (Sr.)
1991	Corey Crowder	SG/SF	United States	Kentucky Wesleyan (Sr.)
1991	Emanual Davis	PG/SG	United States	Delaware State (Sr.)
1991	Patrick Eddie	C	United States	Ole Miss (Sr.)
1991	Vincenzo Esposito	SG	Italy	S.C. Juventus Phonola Caserta (Italy)
1991	Tony Farmer	PF	United States	Nebraska (Sr.)
1991	Jay Guidinger	PF/C	United States	Minnesota–Duluth (Sr.)
1991	Reggie Hanson	SF	United States	Kentucky (Sr.)
1991	Jerome Harmon	SG	United States	Louisville (Sr.)
1991	Keith Jennings	PG	United States	East Tennessee State (Sr.)
1991	Reggie Jordan	SG	United States	New Mexico State (Sr.)
1991	Cedric Lewis	C	United States	Maryland (Sr.)
1991	Keith Owens	SF	United States	UCLA (Sr.)
1991	Robert Pack	PG	United States	USC (Sr.)
1991	Larry Stewart	SF	United States	Coppin State (Sr.)
1991	Brett Szabo	C	United States	Augustana College (South Dakota) (Sr.)
1991	Carl Thomas	SG	United States	Eastern Michigan (Sr.)
1991	Charles Thomas	SG	United States	Eastern Michigan (Sr.)
1991	Donald Whiteside	PG	United States	Northern Illinois (Sr.)
1991	Lorenzo Williams	PF/C	United States	Stetson (Sr.)
1991	Travis Williams	SF	United States	South Carolina State (Sr.)
1992	Gary Alexander	SF	United States	South Florida (Sr.)
1992	Eric Anderson	SF	United States	Indiana (Sr.)
1992	Mark Baker	PG	United States	Ohio State (Jr.)
1992	Alex Blackwell	SF	United States	Monmouth (Sr.)
1992	Marques Bragg	PF	United States	Providence (Sr.)
1992	Tim Breaux	SF	United States	Wyoming (Sr.)
1992	Dexter Cambridge	SF	Bahamas	Texas (Sr.)
1992	Joe Courtney	PF	United States	Southern Miss (Sr.)
1992	Rastko Cvetković	C	Yugoslavia; Serbia	Red Star Belgrade (Yugoslavia)
1992	Dell Demps	PG/SG	United States	Pacific (Sr.)
1992	Harold Ellis	SG	United States	Morehouse (Sr.)
1992	Jo Jo English	SG	United States; Germany	South Carolina (Sr.)
1992	Shane Heal	PG	Australia	Brisbane Bullets (Australia)
1992	Stephen Howard	PF	United States	DePaul (Sr.)
1992	Chris Jent	SF	United States	Ohio State (Sr.)
1992	Sam Mack	SF	United States	Houston (Sr.)
1992	Gerald Madkins	SG	United States	UCLA (Sr.)
1992	Bob Martin	C	United States	Minnesota (Sr.)
1992	Darrick Martin	PG	United States	UCLA (Sr.)
1992	Matt Othick	PG	United States	Arizona (Sr.)
1992	Reggie Slater	PF	United States	Wyoming (Sr.)
1992	Mark Strickland	SF/PF	United States	Temple (Sr.)
1992	Keith Tower	C	United States	Notre Dame (Sr.)
1992	Anthony Tucker	SF	United States	Wake Forest (Sr.)
1992	Marcus Webb	PF/C	United States	Alabama (Sr.)
1992	David Wesley	PG	United States	Baylor (Sr.)
1993	Ashraf Amaya	SF/PF	United States	Southern Illinois (Sr.)
1993	Dexter Boney	SG	United States	UNLV (Sr.)
1993	Bruce Bowen	SF	United States	Cal State Fullerton (Sr.)
1993	Mitchell Butler	PG/SG	United States	UCLA (Sr.)
1993	Kornél Dávid	PF	Hungary	Tungsram-Honvéd BT (Hungary)
1993	Bill Edwards	SF/PF	United States	Wright State (Sr.)
1993	Evric Gray	SF	United States	UNLV (Sr.)
1993	Antonio Harvey	PF	United States	Pfeiffer (Sr.)
1993	Stanley Jackson	SG	United States	UAB (Sr.)
1993	Warren Kidd	C	United States	Middle Tennessee (Sr.)
1993	Todd Mundt	C	United States	Delta State (Sr.)
1993	Julius Nwosu	PF	Nigeria	Liberty (Sr.)
1993	Bo Outlaw	PF/C	United States	Houston (Sr.)
1993	Antoine Rigaudeau	PG/SG	France	Cholet Basket (France)
1993	Brent Scott	C	United States	Rice (Sr.)
1993	Matt Wenstrom	C	United States	North Carolina (Sr.)
1993	Aaron Williams	PF/C	United States	Xavier (Sr.)
1994	Melvin Booker	PG	United States	Missouri (Sr.)
1994	Lazaro Borrell	SF/PF	Cuba	Lobos de Villa Clara (Cuba)
1994	Jimmy Carruth	PF	United States	Virginia Tech (Sr.)
1994	Robert Churchwell	SG	United States	Georgetown (Sr.)
1994	Thomas Hamilton	C	United States	Pittsburgh (Fr.)
1994	Askia Jones	SG	United States; Venezuela	Kansas State (Sr.)
1994	Ryan Lorthridge	PG/SG	United States	Jackson State (Sr.)
1994	Ivano Newbill	PF/SF	United States	Georgia Tech (Sr.)
1994	Derrick Phelps	PG	United States	North Carolina (Sr.)
1994	Trevor Ruffin	PG	United States	Hawaii (Sr.)
1994	Kevin Salvadori	C	United States	North Carolina (Sr.)
1994	Stevin Smith	PG	United States	Arizona State (Sr.)
1994	Aaron Swinson	PF	United States	Auburn (Sr.)
1994	Logan Vander Velden	SF	United States	Green Bay (Sr.)
1994	Fred Vinson	SG	United States	Georgia Tech (Sr.)
1995	John Amaechi	PF/C	United States; United Kingdom; England	Penn State (Sr.)
1995	Corey Beck	PG	United States	Arkansas (Sr.)
1995	Rick Brunson	SG	United States	Temple (Sr.)
1995	John Coker	C	United States	Boise State (Sr.)
1995	Nate Driggers	SG	United States	Montevallo (Sr.)
1995	Devin Gray	SF	United States	Clemson (Sr.)
1995	Michael Hawkins	PG	United States	Xavier (Sr.)
1995	Gerard King	PF	United States	Nicholls State (Sr.)
1995	Matt Maloney	PG	United States	Penn (Sr.)
1995	Clint McDaniel	SG	United States	Arkansas (Sr.)
1995	Howard Nathan	PG	United States	Northwest Arkansas CC (Sr.)
1995	Ruben Nembhard	SG	United States	Weber State (Sr.)
1995	Kevin Ollie	PG	United States	Connecticut (Sr.)
1995	Ray Owes	PF	United States	Arizona (Sr.)
1995	James Scott	SF	United States	St. John's (Sr.)
1995	Larry Sykes	PF	United States	Xavier (Sr.)
1995	David Vanterpool	SG/SF	United States	St. Bonaventure (Sr.)
1995	Rubén Wolkowyski	PF/C	Argentina; Poland	Estudiantes de Olavarría (Argentina)
1996	Chucky Atkins	PG	United States	South Florida (Sr.)
1996	Ira Bowman	SG/SF	United States	Penn (Sr.)
1996	William Cunningham	C	United States	Temple (Sr.)
1996	Adrian Griffin	SG/SF	United States	Seton Hall (Sr.)
1996	Darvin Ham	SF	United States	Texas Tech (Jr.)
1996	Ben Handlogten	C	United States	Western Michigan (Sr.)
1996	Juaquin Hawkins	SF	United States	Long Beach State (Sr.)
1996	Rick Hughes	SF/PF	United States	Thomas More (Sr.)
1996	İbrahim Kutluay	SG	Turkey	Fenerbahçe S.K. (Turkey)
1996	Rusty LaRue	PG	United States	Wake Forest (Sr.)
1996	Horacio Llamas	C	Mexico	Grand Canyon (Sr.)
1996	Art Long	PF	United States	Cincinnati (Sr.)
1996	Joe Stephens	SF	United States	Arkansas–Little Rock (Sr.)
1996	Erick Strickland	PG/SG	United States	Nebraska (Sr.)
1996	Ben Wallace	C	United States	Virginia Union (Sr.)
1996	Brandon Williams	SG/SF	United States	Davidson (Sr.)
1997	Peter Aluma	C	Nigeria	Liberty (Sr.)
1997	Mengke Bateer	C	China	Beijing Ducks (China)
1997	Etdrick Bohannon	SF/PF	United States	Auburn Montgomery (Sr.)
1997	Pat Burke	C	Ireland	Auburn (Sr.)
1997	Keith Closs	C	United States	Central Connecticut (Sr.)
1997	Isaac Fontaine	SG	United States	Washington State (Sr.)
1997	Chris Garner	PG	United States	Memphis (Sr.)
1997	Marlon Garnett	SG	United States; Belize	Santa Clara (Sr.)
1997	Kiwane Garris	PG	United States	Illinois (Sr.)
1997	Derek Grimm	SF/PF	United States	Missouri (Sr.)
1997	Troy Hudson	PG	United States	Southern Illinois (Jr.)
1997	Nate Huffman	C	United States	Central Michigan (Sr.)
1997	Damon Jones	PG/SG	United States	Houston (Jr.)
1997	Jonathan Kerner	C	United States	East Carolina (Sr.)
1997	Mikki Moore	C	United States	Nebraska (Sr.)
1997	Ira Newble	SF/PF	United States	Miami (Ohio) (Sr.)
1997	Fabricio Oberto	PF/C	Argentina; Italy	Asociación Deportiva Atenas (Argentina)
1997	Mike Penberthy	PG	United States	Master's (Sr.)
1997	Jamal Robinson	SF	United States	Virginia (Sr.)
1997	Shea Seals	SG	United States	Tulsa (Sr.)
1997	Alvin Sims	SG	United States	Louisville (Sr.)
1997	Michael Stewart	PF	France; United States	California (Sr.)
1997	Dedric Willoughby	SG/SF	United States	Iowa State (Sr.)
1997	Trevor Winter	C	United States	Minnesota (Sr.)
1998	Earl Boykins	PG	United States	Eastern Michigan (Sr.)
1998	Gerald Brown	SG	United States	Pepperdine (Sr.)
1998	Anthony Carter	PG	United States	Hawaii (Sr.)
1998	Sean Colson	PG	United States	UNC Charlotte (Sr.)
1998	Rubén Garcés	PF/C	Panama; Spain	Providence (Sr.)
1998	Steve Goodrich	PF/C	United States	Princeton (Sr.)
1998	Zendon Hamilton	C	United States	St. John's (Sr.)
1998	Randell Jackson	PF	United States	Florida State (Jr.)
1998	Mike James	PG	United States	Duquesne (Sr.)
1998	Mark Jones	SG/SF	United States	UCF (Sr.)
1998	Šarūnas Jasikevičius	PG	Lithuania	Maryland (Sr.)
1998	Charles Jones	PG/SG	United States	LIU Brooklyn (Sr.)
1998	Garth Joseph	C	Dominica	Peristeri B.C. (Greece)
1998	Kelly McCarty	SG/SF	United States; Russia	Southern Miss (Sr.)
1998	Slava Medvedenko	PF	Ukraine	Budivelnyk Kyiv (Ukraine)
1998	Brad Miller	C	United States	Purdue (Sr.)
1998	Makhtar N'Diaye	PF	Senegal	North Carolina (Sr.)
1998	Tyrone Nesby	SF	United States	UNLV (Sr.)
1998	Daniel Santiago	C	United States; Puerto Rico	Saint Vincent (Sr.)
1998	Jeff Sheppard	PG	United States	Kentucky (Sr.)
1998	Billy Thomas	SG	United States	Kansas (Sr.)
1998	Óscar Torres	SG/SF	Venezuela	Marinos de Oriente (Venezuela)
1999	Chris Andersen	PF	United States	Blinn College (So.)
1999	Michael Batiste	PF/C	United States	Arizona State (Sr.)
1999	Raja Bell	SG	U.S. Virgin Islands; United States	FIU (Sr.)
1999	Geno Carlisle	PG	United States	California (Sr.)
1999	Maurice Carter	SG	United States	LSU (Sr.)
1999	Jorge Garbajosa	PF	Spain	TAU Cerámica (Spain)
1999	Derek Hood	SF/PF	United States	Arkansas (Sr.)
1999	Jermaine Jackson	SG/SF	United States	Detroit (Sr.)
1999	Harold Jamison	PF/C	United States	Clemson (Sr.)
1999	Jason Miskiri	PG/SG	Guyana	George Mason (Sr.)
1999	Boniface N'Dong	C	Senegal; Germany	Spielvereinigung Rattelsdorf (Germany)
1999	Milt Palacio	PG	Belize; United States	Colorado State (Sr.)
1999	Andy Panko	SF/PF	United States	Lebanon Valley (Sr.)
1999	Pablo Prigioni	PG	Argentina; Italy	Obras Sanitarias (Argentina)
1999	Eddie Robinson	SG/SF	United States	Central Oklahoma (Sr.)
1999	Guy Rucker	PF	United States	Iowa (Sr.)
1999	Jamel Thomas	SG/SF	United States	Providence (Sr.)
1999	Wayne Turner	PG	United States	Kentucky (Sr.)
2000	Malik Allen	PF	United States	Villanova (Sr.)
2000	Desmond Ferguson	SF	United States	Detroit (Sr.)
2000	Richie Frahm	SG	United States	Gonzaga (Sr.)
2000	Eddie Gill	PG	United States	Weber State (Sr.)
2000	Paul McPherson	SG	United States	DePaul (Jr.)
2000	Terrance Roberson	SF	United States	Fresno State (Sr.)
2000	Pepe Sánchez	PG	Argentina; Spain	Temple (Sr.)
2000	Alex Scales	SG	United States	Oregon (Sr.)
2000	Ime Udoka	SF	United States; Nigeria	Portland State (Jr.)
2001	Carlos Arroyo	PG	Puerto Rico	FIU (Sr.)
2001	Charlie Bell	SG	United States	Michigan State (Sr.)
2001	Tierre Brown	PG	United States	McNeese State (Sr.)
2001	Joe Crispin	PG	United States	Penn State (Sr.)
2001	Maurice Evans	SG/SF	United States	Texas (Jr.)
2001	Tang Hamilton	SF	United States	Mississippi State (Sr.)
2001	Walter Herrmann	SF	Argentina	Atenas de Córdoba (Argentina)
2001	Horace Jenkins	PG	United States	William Paterson (Sr.)
2001	Jamario Moon	SF	United States	Meridian CC (So.)
2001	Andrés Nocioni	SF/PF	Argentina; Italy	Minorisa.net Manresa (Spain)
2001	Dean Oliver	PG	United States	Iowa (Sr.)
2001	Norman Richardson	SG	United States	Hofstra (Sr.)
2001	Paul Shirley	PF	United States	Iowa State (Sr.)
2001	Cezary Trybański	C	Poland	Znicz Pruszków (Poland)
2001	Ratko Varda	C	Bosnia and Herzegovina; Yugoslavia; Serbia	Partizan Belgrade (Yugoslavia)
2001	Mike Wilks	PG	United States	Rice (Sr.)
2002	Maurice Baker	PG	United States	Oklahoma State (Sr.)
2002	J. R. Bremer	PG	United States; Bosnia and Herzegovina	St. Bonaventure (Sr.)
2002	Devin Brown	SG	United States	UTSA (Sr.)
2002	Josh Davis	PF/SF	United States	Wyoming (Sr.)
2002	Reggie Evans	PF	United States	Iowa (Sr.)
2002	Alex Garcia	SG/SF	Brazil	COC Ribeirão Preto (Brazil)
2002	Lynn Greer	PG/SG	United States	Temple (Sr.)
2002	Anthony Grundy	PG/SG	United States	NC State (Sr.)
2002	Adam Harrington	SG	United States	Auburn (Sr.)
2002	Lorinza Harrington	PG/SG	United States	Wingate (Sr.)
2002	Udonis Haslem	PF	United States	Florida (Sr.)
2002	Linton Johnson	PF	United States	Tulane (Sr.)
2002	Arvydas Macijauskas	SG	Lithuania	Lietuvos Rytas Vilnius (Lithuania)
2002	D. J. Mbenga	C	Belgium; Democratic Republic of the Congo	Spirou Gilly (Belgium)
2002	Keith McLeod	PG	United States	Bowling Green (Sr.)
2002	Jannero Pargo	PG	United States	Arkansas (Sr.)
2002	Smush Parker	PG/SG	United States	Fordham (So.)
2002	Predrag Savović	SG	Montenegro; Spain	Hawaii (Sr.)
2002	Awvee Storey	SG/SF	United States	Arizona State (Sr.)
2002	Yuta Tabuse	PG	Japan	BYU–Hawaii (Fr.)
2003	Earl Barron	C	United States	Memphis (Sr.)
2003	Kevin Burleson	PG	United States	Minnesota (Sr.)
2003	José Calderón	PG	Spain	TAU Cerámica (Spain)
2003	Matt Carroll	SG	United States	Notre Dame (Sr.)
2003	Marquis Daniels	SG/SF	United States	Auburn (Sr.)
2003	Ronald Dupree	SF	United States	LSU (Sr.)
2003	Noel Felix	PF	United States; Belize	Fresno State (Sr.)
2003	Hiram Fuller	PF	United States; Libya	Fresno State (Sr.)
2003	Britton Johnsen	SF/PF	United States	Utah (Sr.)
2003	Brandin Knight	PG	United States	Pittsburgh (Sr.)
2003	Desmond Penigar	PF	United States	Utah State (Sr.)
2003	Kirk Penney	SG/SF	New Zealand	Wisconsin (Sr.)
2003	Josh Powell	PF/C	United States	NC State (So.)
2003	Kasib Powell	SF	United States	Texas Tech (Sr.)
2003	Quinton Ross	SG/SF	United States	SMU (Sr.)
2003	Melvin Sanders	SG/SF	United States	Oklahoma State (Sr.)
2003	James Singleton	SF/PF	United States	Murray State (Sr.)
2003	Theron Smith	SF/PF	United States	Ball State (Sr.)
2004	Pero Antić	C	North Macedonia	AEK Athens (Greece)
2004	Andre Barrett	PG	United States	Seton Hall (Sr.)
2004	Tony Bobbitt	SG	United States	Cincinnati (Sr.)
2004	Andre Brown	PF/C	United States	DePaul (Sr.)
2004	Jackie Butler	PF/C	United States	Coastal Christian Academy (Virginia) (HS Sr.)
2004	Erik Daniels	SF	United States	Kentucky (Sr.)
2004	John Edwards	C	United States	Kent State (Sr.)
2004	Desmond Farmer	SG	United States	USC (Sr.)
2004	Gerald Fitch	SG	United States	Kentucky (Sr.)
2004	Hamed Haddadi	C	Iran	Paykan Tehran (Iran)
2004	Renaldo Major	SF	United States	Fresno State (Sr.)
2004	Jared Reiner	C	United States	Iowa (Sr.)
2004	James Thomas	PF	United States	Texas (Sr.)
2004	Damien Wilkins	SF	United States	Georgia (Sr.)
2005	Lance Allred	PF/C	United States; Mexico	Weber State (Sr.)
2005	Alan Anderson	SG/SF	United States	Michigan State (Sr.)
2005	Kelenna Azubuike	SG/SF	United Kingdom; England; United States; Nigeria	Kentucky (Jr.)
2005	Sean Banks	SF	United States	Memphis (So.)
2005	Eddie Basden	SG	United States	Charlotte (Sr.)
2005	Esteban Batista	C	Uruguay	Aguas de Calpe (Spain)
2005	Will Bynum	PG	United States	Georgia Tech (Sr.)
2005	Will Conroy	PG	United States	Washington (Sr.)
2005	Yakhouba Diawara	SG/SF	France	Pepperdine (Sr.)
2005	Sharrod Ford	PF/C	United States	Clemson (Sr.)
2005	Deng Gai	PF	Sudan; South Sudan	Fairfield (Sr.)
2005	Stephen Graham	SG/SF	United States	Oklahoma State (Sr.)
2005	Devin Green	SG/SF	United States	Hampton (Sr.)
2005	Mike Harris	SF	United States	Rice (Sr.)
2005	Chuck Hayes	PF/C	United States	Kentucky (Sr.)
2005	Marcelo Huertas	PG/SG	Brazil; Italy	DKV Joventut (Spain)
2005	Dwayne Jones	PF/C	United States	Saint Joseph's (Jr.)
2005	Keith Langford	PG/SG	United States	Kansas (Sr.)
2005	John Lucas III	PG	United States	Oklahoma State (Sr.)
2005	Rawle Marshall	SF	Guyana; United States	Oakland (Sr.)
2005	Ivan McFarlin	PF	United States	Oklahoma State (Sr.)
2005	Aaron Miles	PG	United States	Kansas (Sr.)
2005	Randolph Morris	PF/C	United States	Kentucky (Fr.)
2005	Andre Owens	SG	United States	Houston (Sr.)
2005	Kevinn Pinkney	PF/C	United States	Nevada (Sr.)
2005	Roger Powell	SF	United States	Illinois (Sr.)
2005	Ronnie Price	PG	United States	Utah Valley (Sr.)
2005	Shavlik Randolph	PF	United States	Duke (Jr.)
2005	Anthony Roberson	PG	United States	Florida (Jr.)
2005	Luke Schenscher	C	Australia	Georgia Tech (Sr.)
2005	Donell Taylor	SG/SF	United States	UAB (Sr.)
2005	Matt Walsh	SG/SF	United States	Florida (Jr.)
2005	Jawad Williams	PF	United States	North Carolina (Sr.)
2006	Lou Amundson	PF/C	United States	UNLV (Sr.)
2006	J. J. Barea	PG	Puerto Rico	Northeastern (Sr.)
2006	Cedric Bozeman	SG/SF	United States	UCLA (Sr.)
2006	Chris Copeland	SF	United States	Colorado (Sr.)
2006	Thomas Gardner	SG	United States	Missouri (Sr.)
2006	Mike Hall	SF	United States; Ireland	George Washington (Sr.)
2006	Robert Hite	PG/SG	United States	Miami (Florida) (Sr.)
2006	Chris Hunter	PF/C	United States	Michigan (Sr.)
2006	Dontell Jefferson	SG	United States	Arkansas (Sr.)
2006	Eugene Jeter	PG	United States; Ukraine	Portland (Sr.)
2006	Carldell Johnson	PG	United States	UAB (Sr.)
2006	Tarence Kinsey	SG/SF	United States	South Carolina (Sr.)
2006	Chris McCray	SG	United States	Maryland (Sr.)
2006	Pops Mensah-Bonsu	PF/C	United Kingdom; England	George Washington (Sr.)
2006	Larry Owens	SG/SF	United States	Oral Roberts (Sr.)
2006	Chris Quinn	PG	United States	Notre Dame (Sr.)
2006	Allan Ray	SG/PG	United States	Villanova (Sr.)
2006	Jeremy Richardson	SG/SF	United States	Delta State (Sr.)
2006	Walker Russell Jr.	PG	United States	Jacksonville State (Sr.)
2006	Steven Smith	SF/PF	United States	La Salle (Sr.)
2006	Darius Washington Jr.	PG/SG	United States; North Macedonia	Memphis (So.)
2006	C. J. Watson	PG	United States	Tennessee (Sr.)
2006	Justin Williams	PF/C	United States	Wyoming (Sr.)
2007	Blake Ahearn	PG	United States	Missouri State (Sr.)
2007	Joel Anthony	C	Canada	UNLV (Sr.)
2007	Gustavo Ayón	PF/C	Mexico	Vaqueros de Agua Prieta (Mexico)
2007	Bobby Brown	PG	United States	Cal State Fullerton (Sr.)
2007	Eric Dawson	PF/C	United States	Midwestern State (Sr.)
2007	Zabian Dowdell	PG	United States	Virginia Tech (Sr.)
2007	Andre Ingram	SG	United States	American (Sr.)
2007	Ivan Johnson	PF	United States	Cal State San Bernardino (Sr.)
2007	Trey Johnson	SG	United States	Jackson State (Sr.)
2007	Coby Karl	SG	United States	Boise State (Sr.)
2007	Oliver Lafayette	PG/SG	United States; Croatia	Houston (Sr.)
2007	Cartier Martin	SG/SF	United States	Kansas State (Sr.)
2007	Gary Neal	SG	United States	Towson (Sr.)
2007	Mustafa Shakur	PG	United States	Arizona (Sr.)
2007	Courtney Sims	C	United States	Michigan (Sr.)
2007	Mirza Teletović	PF	Bosnia and Herzegovina	TAU Cerámica (Spain)
2007	Anthony Tolliver	PF	United States	Creighton (Sr.)
2007	Darryl Watkins	C	United States	Syracuse (Sr.)
2007	Mario West	SG	United States	Georgia Tech (Sr.)
2008	Gary Forbes	SF	Panama	UMass (Sr.)
2008	Sundiata Gaines	PG	United States	Georgia (Sr.)
2008	Trey Gilder	SF	United States	Northwestern State (Sr.)
2008	Mickell Gladness	C	United States	Alabama A&M (Sr.)
2008	Steven Hill	PF	United States	Arkansas (Sr.)
2008	Othello Hunter	PF/C	United States	Ohio State (Sr.)
2008	Othyus Jeffers	SG	United States	Robert Morris (Illinois) (Sr.)
2008	Rob Kurz	SF	United States	Notre Dame (Sr.)
2008	Salah Mejri	C	Tunisia	Étoile Sportive du Sahel (Tunisia)
2008	Gal Mekel	PG	Israel	Wichita State (So.)
2008	Anthony Morrow	SG	United States	Georgia Tech (Sr.)
2008	Timofey Mozgov	C	Russia	Khimki Moscow (Russia)
2008	DeMarcus Nelson	PG	United States	Duke (Sr.)
2008	Brian Roberts	PG	United States	Dayton (Sr.)
2008	Damjan Rudež	PF	Croatia	KK Split CO (Croatia)
2008	Greg Stiemsma	C	United States	Wisconsin (Sr.)
2008	Reggie Williams	SF	United States	VMI (Sr.)
2009	Jeff Adrien	PF	United States	Connecticut (Sr.)
2009	Josh Akognon	PG	United States; Nigeria	Cal State Fullerton (Sr.)
2009	Antonio Anderson	SG	United States	Memphis (Sr.)
2009	Aron Baynes	PF/C	New Zealand; Australia	Washington State (Sr.)
2009	Dionte Christmas	SG	United States	Temple (Sr.)
2009	Marcus Cousin	C	United States	Houston (Sr.)
2009	Luigi Datome	SF	Italy	Virtus Roma (Italy)
2009	Justin Dentmon	PG	United States	Washington (Sr.)
2009	Shane Edwards	SF	United States	Arkansas–Little Rock (Sr.)
2009	Vítor Faverani	PF/C	Brazil	Clinicas Rincón Axarquía (Spain)
2009	Alonzo Gee	SG/SF	United States	Alabama (Sr.)
2009	Terrel Harris	SG	United States	Oklahoma State (Sr.)
2009	Joe Ingles	SG	Australia	South Dragons (Australia)
2009	Aaron Jackson	PG/SG	United States	Duquesne (Sr.)
2009	Cedric Jackson	PG	United States	Cleveland State (Sr.)
2009	Chris Johnson	PF/C	United States	LSU (Sr.)
2009	Viacheslav Kravtsov	C	Ukraine	BC Kyiv (Ukraine)
2009	Marcus Landry	PF	United States	Wisconsin (Sr.)
2009	Wesley Matthews	SG/SF	United States	Marquette (Sr.)
2009	Jerel McNeal	PG/SG	United States	Marquette (Sr.)
2009	Jeremy Pargo	PG	United States	Gonzaga (Sr.)
2009	Garret Siler	C	United States	Augusta State (Sr.)
2009	Garrett Temple	PG/SG	United States	LSU (Sr.)
2009	Miloš Teodosić	G	Serbia	Olympiacos Piraeus (Greece)
2009	Luke Zeller	F/C	United States; Georgia	Notre Dame (Sr.)
2010	Patrick Christopher	SG/SF	United States	California (Sr.)
2010	Sherron Collins	PG	United States	Kansas (Sr.)
2010	Jerome Dyson	G	United States	Connecticut (Jr.)
2010	Jeff Foote	C	United States	Cornell (Sr.)
2010	Courtney Fortson	PG	United States	Arkansas (Sr.)
2010	Jonathan Gibson	PG	United States	New Mexico State (Sr.)
2010	Manny Harris	PG/SG	United States	Michigan (Jr.)
2010	Dennis Horner	PF	United States	NC State (Sr.)
2010	Jeremy Lin	PG	United States	Harvard (Sr.)
2010	Boban Marjanović	C	Serbia	KK Hemofarm (Serbia)
2010	Elijah Millsap	SG/SF	United States	UAB (Sr.)
2010	Tim Ohlbrecht	PF/C	Germany	Brose Baskets (Germany)
2010	Arinze Onuaku	PF/C	United States	Syracuse (Sr.)
2010	Miroslav Raduljica	C	Serbia	Efes Pilsen (Turkey)
2010	Samardo Samuels	PF/C	Jamaica	Louisville (So.)
2010	Alexey Shved	PG/SG	Russia	CSKA Moscow (Russia)
2010	Donald Sloan	PG	United States	Texas A&M (Sr.)
2010	Ish Smith	G	United States	Wake Forest (Sr.)
2010	Jerry Smith	G	United States	Louisville (Sr.)
2010	Lance Thomas	PF	United States	Duke (Sr.)
2010	Edwin Ubiles	SG/SF	United States	Siena (Sr.)
2010	Ben Uzoh	PG	United States; Nigeria	Tulsa (Sr.)
2011	Dairis Bertāns	SG	Latvia	VEF Rīga (Latvia)
2011	Dwight Buycks	PG	United States	Marquette (Sr.)
2011	Malcolm Delaney	G	United States	Virginia Tech (Sr.)
2011	Zoran Dragić	G/F	Slovenia	KK Krka (Slovenia)
2011	Diante Garrett	G	United States	Iowa State (Sr.)
2011	Ben Hansbrough	G	United States	Notre Dame (Sr.)
2011	Cory Higgins	G	United States	Colorado (Sr.)
2011	Justin Holiday	F	United States	Washington (Sr.)
2011	John Holland	SG	United States; Puerto Rico	Boston University (Sr.)
2011	Scotty Hopson	SG	United States	Tennessee (Jr.)
2011	Omari Johnson	SF/PF	Jamaica; United States	Oregon State (Sr.)
2011	D. J. Kennedy	G/F	United States	St. John's (Sr.)
2011	Mindaugas Kuzminskas	SF	Lithuania	Žalgiris Kaunas (Lithuania)
2011	Kalin Lucas	PG	United States	Michigan State (Sr.)
2011	Jacob Pullen	PG	United States; Georgia	Kansas State (Sr.)
2011	Willie Reed	F/C	United States	Saint Louis (So.)
2011	Xavier Silas	G	United States	Northern Illinois (Sr.)
2011	Greg Smith	C	United States	Fresno State (So.)
2011	Alex Stepheson	PF	United States	USC (Sr.)
2011	Julyan Stone	SG	United States	UTEP (Sr.)
2011	Malcolm Thomas	F	United States	San Diego State (Sr.)
2011	Mychel Thompson	F/G	United States	Pepperdine (Sr.)
2011	Brad Wanamaker	SG	United States	Pittsburgh (Sr.)
2011	Chris Wright	F	United States	Dayton (Sr.)
2011	Chris Wright	PG	United States	Georgetown (Sr.)
2012	Kent Bazemore	SG/SF	United States	Old Dominion (Sr.)
2012	Drew Gordon	PF	United States	New Mexico (Sr.)
2012	JaMychal Green	PF/C	United States	Alabama (Sr.)
2012	Jorge Gutiérrez	PG/SG	Mexico	California (Sr.)
2012	Mike James	PG	United States	Lamar (Sr.)
2012	Chris Johnson	SF/SG	United States	Dayton (Sr.)
2012	DeQuan Jones	SF/SG	United States	Miami (Florida) (Sr.)
2012	Kevin Jones	PF	United States	West Virginia (Sr.)
2012	Nicolás Laprovíttola	PG	Argentina; Italy	Club Atlético Lanús (Argentina)
2012	Scott Machado	PG	United States; Brazil	Iona (Sr.)
2012	Josh Magette	PG	United States	Alabama–Huntsville (Sr.)
2012	Tony Mitchell	SF	United States	Alabama (Jr.)
2012	Toure' Murry	SG/PG	United States	Wichita State (Sr.)
2012	James Nunnally	SF/SG	United States	UC Santa Barbara (Sr.)
2012	Jonathon Simmons	SG/SF	United States	Houston (Jr.)
2012	Henry Sims	PF/C	United States	Georgetown (Sr.)
2012	Chris Smith	PG	United States	Louisville (Sr.)
2012	Hollis Thompson	SF/SG	United States	Georgetown (Jr.)
2012	Casper Ware	PG	United States	Long Beach State (Sr.)
2012	Maalik Wayns	PG	United States	Villanova (Jr.)
2012	C. J. Williams	SG	United States	NC State (Sr.)
2013	Chris Babb	SG	United States	Iowa State (Sr.)
2013	Vander Blue	SG	United States	Marquette (Jr.)
2013	Ryan Broekhoff	SF/SG	Australia	Valparaiso (Sr.)
2013	Facundo Campazzo	PG	Argentina	Club Atlético Peñarol (Argentina)
2013	Will Cherry	PG	United States	Montana (Sr.)
2013	Ian Clark	SG	United States	Belmont (Sr.)
2013	Jack Cooley	PF	United States	Notre Dame (Sr.)
2013	Robert Covington	SF	United States	Tennessee State (Sr.)
2013	Seth Curry	PG	United States	Duke (Sr.)
2013	Troy Daniels	SG	United States	VCU (Sr.)
2013	Brandon Davies	PF	United States; Uganda	BYU (Sr.)
2013	Dewayne Dedmon	C	United States	USC (Jr.)
2013	Matthew Dellavedova	PG	Australia	Saint Mary's (Sr.)
2013	Larry Drew II	PG	United States	UCLA (Sr.)
2013	Elias Harris	F	Germany	Gonzaga (Sr.)
2013	Reggie Hearn	SG	United States	Northwestern (Sr.)
2013	Rodney McGruder	SG	United States	Kansas State (Sr.)
2013	Trey McKinney-Jones	SG	United States	Miami (Florida) (Sr.)
2013	Nicolò Melli	PF/C	Italy	Pallacanestro Olimpia Milano (Italy)
2013	Brandon Paul	SG	United States	Illinois (Sr.)
2013	Phil Pressey	PG	United States	Missouri (Jr.)
2013	James Southerland	SF	United States	Syracuse (Sr.)
2013	D. J. Stephens	SF/SG	United States	Memphis (Sr.)
2013	Daniel Theis	PF/C	Germany	Ratiopharm Ulm (Germany)
2013	Adonis Thomas	SF/SG	United States	Memphis (So.)
2014	Keith Appling	PG	United States	Michigan State (Sr.)
2014	Jerrelle Benimon	PF	United States	Towson (Sr.)
2014	Sim Bhullar	C	Canada	New Mexico State (So.)
2014	Khem Birch	PF/C	Canada	UNLV (Sr.)
2014	Tarik Black	PF	United States	Kansas (Sr.)
2014	Jabari Brown	SG	United States	Missouri (Jr.)
2014	Coty Clarke	SF	United States	Arkansas (Sr.)
2014	Bryce Cotton	PG	United States	Providence (Sr.)
2014	Torrey Craig	SG/SF	United States	USC Upstate (Sr.)
2014	Mitch Creek	SG/SF	Australia	Adelaide 36ers (Australia)
2014	Andre Dawkins	SG	United States	Duke (Sr.)
2014	Jarell Eddie	SF	United States	Virginia Tech (Sr.)
2014	Cristiano Felício	PF/C	Brazil	Clube de Regatas do Flamengo (Brazil)
2014	Tim Frazier	PG/SG	United States	Penn State (Sr.)
2014	Langston Galloway	PG	United States	Saint Joseph's (Sr.)
2014	Tyler Johnson	SG	United States	Fresno State (Sr.)
2014	Sean Kilpatrick	SG	United States	Cincinnati (Sr.)
2014	Alex Kirk	C	United States	New Mexico (Sr.)
2014	Maxi Kleber	PF	Germany	s.Oliver Baskets (Germany)
2014	Walter Lemon Jr.	PG	United States	Bradley (Sr.)
2014	James Michael McAdoo	PF	United States	North Carolina (Jr.)
2014	Eric Moreland	PF	United States	Oregon State (Sr.)
2014	Xavier Munford	PG	United States	Rhode Island (Sr.)
2014	Norvel Pelle	PF	Antigua and Barbuda; United States; Lebanon	Delaware 87ers (NBA D-League)
2014	JaKarr Sampson	PF	United States	St. John's (So.)
2014	David Stockton	PG	United States	Gonzaga (Sr.)
2014	Axel Toupane	SG/SF	France	Strasbourg IG (France)
2014	David Wear	PF	United States	UCLA (Sr.)
2014	Travis Wear	SF	United States	UCLA (Sr.)
2014	Okaro White	SF/PF	United States	Florida State (Sr.)
2014	Shayne Whittington	PF/C	United States	Western Michigan (Sr.)
2014	Jamil Wilson	SF	United States	Marquette (Sr.)
2015	Cliff Alexander	PF	United States	Kansas (Fr.)
2015	Nicolás Brussino	SF/SG	Argentina; Italy	Regatas Corrientes (Argentina)
2015	Quinn Cook	PG	United States	Duke (Sr.)
2015	Bryce Dejean-Jones	SG	United States	Iowa State (Sr.)
2015	Duje Dukan	PF	Croatia; United States	Wisconsin (Sr.)
2015	Michael Frazier II	SG	United States	Florida (Jr.)
2015	Treveon Graham	SG	United States	VCU (Sr.)
2015	Javonte Green	SF/SG	United States	Radford (Sr.)
2015	William Howard	SG	France	Denain Voltaire (France)
2015	Aaron Harrison	SG	United States	Kentucky (So.)
2015	Vince Hunter	SF	United States	UTEP (So.)
2015	Stanton Kidd	SF	United States	Colorado State (Sr.)
2015	T. J. McConnell	PG	United States	Arizona (Sr.)
2015	Alfonzo McKinnie	SF	United States	Green Bay (Sr.)
2015	Malcolm Miller	SF	United States	Holy Cross (Sr.)
2015	Luis Montero	SG	Dominican Republic	Westchester CC (So.)
2015	Maurice Ndour	PF	Senegal	Ohio (Sr.)
2015	J. J. O'Brien	SF/SG	United States	San Diego State (Sr.)
2015	Royce O'Neale	SF	United States	Baylor (Sr.)
2015	Kevin Pangos	PG	Canada	Gonzaga (Sr.)
2015	Vincent Poirier	C	France	Paris-Levallois Basket (France)
2015	Chasson Randle	PG	United States	Stanford (Sr.)
2015	Jordan Sibert	SG	United States	Dayton (Sr.)
2015	Keifer Sykes	PG	United States	Green Bay (Sr.)
2015	Juan Toscano-Anderson	SF	Mexico	Marquette (Sr.)
2015	Julian Washburn	SF	United States	UTEP (Sr.)
2015	Brianté Weber	PG	United States	VCU (Sr.)
2015	Greg Whittington	PF	United States	Georgetown (So.)
2015	Alan Williams	C/F	United States	UC Santa Barbara (Sr.)
2015	Christian Wood	PF	United States	UNLV (So.)
2016	DeVaughn Akoon-Purcell	SG/SF	United States; Trinidad and Tobago	Illinois State (Sr.)
2016	Ryan Arcidiacono	PG	United States; Italy	Villanova (Sr.)
2016	Ron Baker	SG/PG	United States	Wichita State (Sr.)
2016	Cat Barber	PG	United States	NC State (Jr.)
2016	Alex Caruso	SG	United States	Texas A&M (Sr.)
2016	Kyle Collinsworth	PG	United States	BYU (Sr.)
2016	Matt Costello	PF/C	United States	Michigan State (Sr.)
2016	Yogi Ferrell	PG	United States	Indiana (Sr.)
2016	Dorian Finney-Smith	SF	United States	Florida (Sr.)
2016	Bryn Forbes	PG	United States	Michigan State (Sr.)
2016	Patricio Garino	SG/SF	Argentina; Italy	George Washington (Sr.)
2016	Marcus Georges-Hunt	SG	United States	Georgia Tech (Sr.)
2016	Anthony Gill	PF	United States	Virginia (Sr.)
2016	Josh Gray	PG	United States	LSU (Sr.)
2016	Shaquille Harrison	SG	United States	Tulsa (Sr.)
2016	Myke Henry	SG/SF	United States	DePaul (Sr.)
2016	Danuel House	SG	United States	Texas A&M (Sr.)
2016	Derrick Jones Jr.	SF	United States	UNLV (Fr.)
2016	Jalen Jones	SF	United States	Texas A&M (Sr.)
2016	Damion Lee	SG	United States	Louisville (Sr.)
2016	Shawn Long	PF	United States	Louisiana (Sr.)
2016	Jordan Loyd	PG/SG	United States	Indianapolis (Sr.)
2016	Gabriel Lundberg	PG	Denmark	Horsens Idræts Club (Denmark)
2016	Sheldon McClellan	SG	United States	Miami (Florida) (Sr.)
2016	David Nwaba	SG	United States	Cal Poly (Sr.)
2016	Daniel Ochefu	PF	United States; Nigeria	Villanova (Sr.)
2016	Jaysean Paige	PG	United States; Puerto Rico	West Virginia (Sr.)
2016	Gary Payton II	PG	United States	Oregon State (Sr.)
2016	Marshall Plumlee	C	United States	Duke (Sr.)
2016	Alex Poythress	SF/PF	United States	Kentucky (Sr.)
2016	Tim Quarterman	PG/SG	United States	LSU (Jr.)
2016	Wayne Selden Jr.	PG/SG	United States	Kansas (Jr.)
2016	Craig Sword	SG	United States	Mississippi State (Sr.)
2016	Isaiah Taylor	PG	United States	Texas (Jr.)
2016	Mike Tobey	C	United States; Slovenia	Virginia (Sr.)
2016	Jarrod Uthoff	PF	United States	Iowa (Sr.)
2016	Fred VanVleet	PG	United States	Wichita State (Sr.)
2016	Jameel Warney	PF	United States	Stony Brook (Sr.)
2016	James Webb III	SF	United States	Boise State (Jr.)
2016	Troy Williams	SF	United States	Indiana (Jr.)
2016	Kyle Wiltjer	PF/SF	United States; Canada	Gonzaga (Sr.)
2016	Gabe York	PG/SG	United States	Arizona (Sr.)
2017	Jamel Artis	SG/SF	United States	Pittsburgh (Sr.)
2017	Paris Bass	SF	United States	Detroit Mercy (So.)
2017	Antonio Blakeney	PG	United States	LSU (So.)
2017	Chris Boucher	PF	Canada; Saint Lucia	Oregon (Sr.)
2017	Amida Brimah	C	Ghana	UConn (Sr.)
2017	Isaiah Briscoe	PG	United States	Kentucky (So.)
2017	Deonte Burton	SG	United States	Iowa State (Sr.)
2017	Troy Caupain	PG	United States	Cincinnati (Sr.)
2017	Tyler Cavanaugh	PF	United States	George Washington (Sr.)
2017	Gian Clavell	SG	Puerto Rico	Colorado State (Sr.)
2017	Antonius Cleveland	SG	United States	Southeast Missouri State (Sr.)
2017	Chance Comanche	PF/C	United States	Arizona (So.)
2017	Charles Cooke	SG	United States	Dayton (Sr.)
2017	Gabriel Deck	SF/PF	Argentina	San Lorenzo de Almagro (Argentina)
2017	Milton Doyle	SG	United States	Loyola (Illinois) (Sr.)
2017	PJ Dozier	SG	United States	South Carolina (So.)
2017	Simone Fontecchio	SF	Italy	Vanoli Cremona (Italy)
2017	Billy Garrett Jr.	SG	United States	DePaul (Sr.)
2017	Marko Gudurić	SG/SF	Serbia	KK Crvena zvezda (Serbia)
2017	Dusty Hannahs	SG	United States	Arkansas (Sr.)
2017	Nigel Hayes	SF	United States	Wisconsin (Sr.)
2017	Isaiah Hicks	PF	United States	North Carolina (Sr.)
2017	Malcolm Hill	SF	United States	Illinois (Sr.)
2017	Isaac Humphries	C	Australia	Kentucky (So.)
2017	Amile Jefferson	PF	United States	Duke (Sr.)
2017	Luke Kornet	PF/C	United States	Vanderbilt (Sr.)
2017	Mangok Mathiang	PF/C	Australia; Sudan; South Sudan	Louisville (Sr.)
2017	Tahjere McCall	SG	United States	Tennessee State (Sr.)
2017	Erik McCree	PF	United States	Louisiana Tech (Sr.)
2017	Eric Mika	PF/C	United States	BYU (So.)
2017	Naz Mitrou-Long	PG/SG	Canada; Greece	Iowa State (Sr.)
2017	Xavier Moon	SG	United States	Morehead State (Sr.)
2017	Ben Moore	SF	United States	SMU (Sr.)
2017	Jaylen Morris	SG	United States	Molloy College (Sr.)
2017	Johnathan Motley	PF	United States	Baylor (Jr.)
2017	Mychal Mulder	SG	Canada	Kentucky (Sr.)
2017	Cameron Oliver	F	United States	Nevada (So.)
2017	Trayvon Palmer	SG	United States	Chicago State (Sr.)
2017	London Perrantes	PG	United States	Virginia (Sr.)
2017	Rodney Purvis	SG	United States	Connecticut (Sr.)
2017	Xavier Rathan-Mayes	SF	Canada	Florida State (Jr.)
2017	Devin Robinson	SF	United States	Florida (Jr.)
2017	Kobi Simmons	PG	United States	Arizona (Fr.)
2017	Matt Thomas	SG	United States	Iowa State (Sr.
2017	Luca Vildoza	PG/SG	Argentina	Saski Baskonia (Spain)
2017	Ish Wainright	PF	United States; Uganda	Baylor (Sr.)
2017	Derrick Walton	PG	United States	Michigan (Sr.)
2017	Paul Watson	SG	United States	Fresno State (Sr.)
2017	Andrew White	SF	United States	Syracuse (Sr.)
2017	Jacob Wiley	SF	United States	Eastern Washington (Sr.)
2017	Matt Williams	SG	United States	UCF (Sr.)
2018	Jaylen Adams	PG	United States	St. Bonaventure (Sr.)
2018	Deng Adel	SF	South Sudan; Australia	Louisville (Jr.)
2018	Rawle Alkins	PG/SG	United States	Arizona (So.)
2018	Elijah Bryant	SG/PG	United States	BYU (Jr.)
2018	Joe Chealey	PG	United States	College of Charleston (Sr.)
2018	Chris Chiozza	PG	United States	Florida (Sr.)
2018	Gary Clark	PF	United States	Cincinnati (Sr.)
2018	Bonzie Colson	PF	United States	Notre Dame (Sr.)
2018	Xavier Cooks	PF	Australia	Winthrop (Sr.)
2018	Marcus Derrickson	SF	United States	Georgetown (Jr.)
2018	Tyler Davis	C	United States; Puerto Rico	Texas A&M (Jr.)
2018	Ángel Delgado	C	Dominican Republic	Seton Hall (Sr.)
2018	Trevon Duval	PG	United States	Duke (Fr.)
2018	Drew Eubanks	PF/C	United States	Oregon State (Jr.)
2018	Wenyen Gabriel	F	Sudan; South Sudan; United States	Kentucky (So.)
2018	Kaiser Gates	SF	United States	Xavier (Sr.)
2018	Brandon Goodwin	PG	United States	Florida Gulf Coast (Sr.)
2018	Donte Grantham	F	United States	Clemson (Sr.)
2018	Haywood Highsmith	SF	United States	Wheeling Jesuit (Sr.)
2018	B. J. Johnson	SG	United States	La Salle (Sr.)
2018	Jemerrio Jones	SF	United States	New Mexico State (Sr.)
2018	Jock Landale	C	Australia	Saint Mary's (Sr.)
2018	Zach Lofton	SG	United States	New Mexico State (Sr.)
2018	Daryl Macon	SG	United States	Arkansas (Sr.)
2018	J. P. Macura	SG	United States	Xavier (Sr.)
2018	Will Magnay	C/PF	Australia	Brisbane Bullets (Australia)
2018	Kelan Martin	SF	United States	Butler (Sr.)
2018	Yante Maten	PF	United States	Georgia (Sr.)
2018	Dakota Mathias	SG	United States	Purdue (Sr.)
2018	Jordan McLaughlin	PG	United States	USC (Sr.)
2018	Chima Moneke	SF	Nigeria	UC Davis (Sr.)
2018	Malik Newman	SG	United States	Kansas (So.)
2018	Kendrick Nunn	PG/SG	United States	Oakland (Sr.)
2018	Theo Pinson	SG/SF	United States	North Carolina (Sr.)
2018	Duop Reath	C	Australia; South Sudan	LSU (Sr.)
2018	Cameron Reynolds	SG	United States	Tulane (Sr.)
2018	Duncan Robinson	SF/SG	United States	Michigan (Sr.)
2018	Brandon Sampson	SG	United States	LSU (Jr.)
2018	Jae'Sean Tate	SG	United States	Ohio State (Sr.)
2018	Jared Terrell	SG	United States	Rhode Island (Sr.)
2018	Emanuel Terry	PF	United States	Lincoln Memorial (Sr.)
2018	Allonzo Trier	SG	United States	Arizona (Jr.)
2018	Gabe Vincent	SF	Nigeria	UC Santa Barbara (Sr.)
2018	Yuta Watanabe	SF	Japan	George Washington (Sr.)
2018	Johnathan Williams	PF	United States	Gonzaga (Sr.)
2018	Kenrich Williams	SF	United States	TCU (Sr.)
2019	Kyle Alexander	PF	Canada	Tennessee (Sr.)
2019	Keljin Blevins	SG	United States	Montana State (Sr.)
2019	Marques Bolden	C	United States; Indonesia	Duke (Jr.)
2019	Brian Bowen	SF/SG	United States	Sydney Kings (Australia)
2019	Ky Bowman	PG	United States	Boston College (Jr.)
2019	Oshae Brissett	SF	Canada	Syracuse (So.)
2019	Armoni Brooks	SG	United States	Houston (Jr.)
2019	Charlie Brown Jr.	SF	United States	Saint Joseph's (So.)
2019	Moses Brown	C	United States	UCLA (Fr.)
2019	Shaq Buchanan	SG	United States	Murray State (Sr.)
2019	Devontae Cacok	PF	United States	UNC Wilmington (Sr.)
2019	Devin Cannady	PG	United States	Princeton (Sr.)
2019	Zylan Cheatham	SF	United States	Arizona State (Sr.)
2019	Chris Clemons	PG	United States	Campbell (Sr.)
2019	Amir Coffey	SG	United States	Minnesota (Jr.)
2019	Tyler Cook	PF	United States	Iowa (Jr.)
2019	Terence Davis	SG	United States	Ole Miss (Sr.)
2019	Luguentz Dort	SG	Canada	Arizona State (Fr.)
2019	Tacko Fall	C	Senegal	UCF (Sr.)
2019	Robert Franks	PF	United States	Washington State (Sr.)
2019	Hassani Gravett	PG	United States	South Carolina (Sr.)
2019	Donta Hall	PF/C	United States; Azerbaijan	Alabama (Sr.)
2019	Tyler Hall	SG	United States	Montana State (Sr.)
2019	Jared Harper	PG	United States	Auburn (Jr.)
2019	Jaylen Hoard	SF	France	Wake Forest (Fr.)
2019	DaQuan Jeffries	SG/SF	United States	Tulsa (Sr.)
2019	Louis King	SF	United States	Oregon (Fr.)
2019	John Konchar	SG	United States	Purdue Fort Wayne (Sr.)
2019	Vic Law	SF	United States	Northwestern (Sr.)
2019	Jalen Lecque	PG	United States	Brewster Academy (HS Pg.)
2019	Caleb Martin	SG/SF	United States	Nevada (Sr.)
2019	Jeremiah Martin	PG	United States	Memphis (Sr.)
2019	Garrison Mathews	SG	United States	Lipscomb (Sr.)
2019	Jack McVeigh	PF	Australia	Nebraska (Jr.)
2019	Adam Mokoka	SG	France	Mega Bemax (Serbia)
2019	Matt Mooney	SG	United States	Texas Tech (Sr.)
2019	Juwan Morgan	F	United States	Indiana (Sr.)
2019	Zach Norvell Jr.	SG	United States	Gonzaga (So.)
2019	Tariq Owens	F	United States	Texas Tech (Sr.)
2019	Shamorie Ponds	PG	United States	St. John's (Jr.)
2019	Jontay Porter	PF	United States	Missouri (So.)
2019	Josh Reaves	SG	United States	Penn State (Sr.)
2019	Naz Reid	PF/C	United States	LSU (Fr.)
2019	Justin Robinson	PG	United States	Virginia Tech (Sr.)
2019	Chris Silva	PF	Gabon	South Carolina (Sr.)
2019	Max Strus	SG	United States	DePaul (Sr.)
2019	Rayjon Tucker	SG	United States	Little Rock (Jr.)
2019	Dean Wade	PF	United States	Kansas State (Sr.)
2019	Lindell Wigginton	PG	Canada	Iowa State (So.)
2020	Ty-Shon Alexander	SG	United States	Creighton (Jr.)
2020	Jarron Cumberland	SG	United States	Cincinnati (Sr.)
2020	Nate Darling	SG	Canada	Delaware (Jr.)
2020	Javin DeLaurier	C	United States	Duke (Sr.)
2020	Mamadi Diakite	PF	Guinea	Virginia (Sr.)
2020	Alpha Diallo	SG/SF	United States; Guinea	Providence (Sr.)
2020	Devon Dotson	PG	United States	Kansas (So.)
2020	Jeff Dowtin	PG	United States	Rhode Island (Sr.)
2020	Jaime Echenique	C	Colombia	Wichita State (Sr.)
2020	Rob Edwards	SG	United States	Arizona State (Sr.)
2020	Malik Fitts	PF	United States	Saint Mary's (Jr.)
2020	Jordan Ford	PG	United States	Saint Mary's (Sr.)
2020	Trent Forrest	PG/SG	United States	Florida State (Sr.)
2020	Freddie Gillespie	PF	United States	Baylor (Sr.)
2020	Ashton Hagans	PG	United States	Kentucky (So.)
2020	Josh Hall	SF	United States	Moravian Prep (NC) (Postgraduate)
2020	Kevon Harris	SF	United States	Stephen F. Austin (Sr.)
2020	Nate Hinton	SG	United States	Houston (So.)
2020	Markus Howard	PG	United States	Marquette (Sr.)
2020	Mason Jones	SG	United States	Arkansas (Jr.)
2020	Kylor Kelley	PF/C	United States	Oregon State (Sr.)
2020	Braxton Key	SF/SG	United States	Virginia (Sr.)
2020	Nathan Knight	PF/C	United States	William & Mary (Sr.)
2020	Anthony Lamb	SF	United States	Vermont (Sr.)
2020	Karim Mané	PG	Canada	Vanier College (Jr.)
2020	Naji Marshall	SF	United States	Xavier (Jr.)
2020	Sean McDermott	SF	United States	Butler (Sr.)
2020	Cameron McGriff	SF	United States	Oklahoma State (Sr.)
2020	Ade Murkey	SG	United States	Denver (Sr.)
2020	Myles Powell	SG	United States	Seton Hall (Sr.)
2020	Trevelin Queen	SG	United States	New Mexico State (Sr.)
2020	Jackson Rowe	SF	Canada	Cal State Fullerton (Sr.)
2020	Matt Ryan	SF	United States	Chattanooga (Sr.)
2020	Trevon Scott	SG	United States	Cincinnati (Sr.)
2020	Zavier Simpson	PG	United States	Michigan (Sr.)
2020	Dmytro Skapintsev	C	Ukraine	Cherkaski Mavpy (Ukraine)
2020	Xavier Sneed	SF	United States	Kansas State (Sr.)
2020	Pat Spencer	PG/SG	United States	Northwestern (Sr.)
2020	Lamar Stevens	PF	United States	Penn State (Sr.)
2020	Jon Teske	C	United States	Michigan (Sr.)
2020	Brodric Thomas	SG	United States	Truman (Sr.)
2020	Killian Tillie	PF/C	France	Gonzaga (Sr.)
2020	Lindy Waters III	SG	United States	Oklahoma State (Sr.)
2020	Jack White	SF	Australia	Duke (Sr.)
2020	Ömer Yurtseven	C	Turkey; Uzbekistan	Georgetown (Jr.)
2021	Jose Alvarado	PG	United States; Puerto Rico	Georgia Tech (Sr.)
2021	Alex Antetokounmpo	PF	Greece	UCAM Murcia (Spain)
2021	Joël Ayayi	SG	France	Gonzaga (Jr.)
2021	Onuralp Bitim	SF	Turkey	Frutti Extra Bursaspor (Turkey)
2021	Chaundee Brown	SG	United States	Michigan (Sr.)
2021	D. J. Carton	PG	United States	Marquette (So.)
2021	Justin Champagnie	SF	United States	Pittsburgh (So.)
2021	Jalen Crutcher	PG	United States	Dayton (Sr.)
2021	David Duke Jr.	SG	United States	Providence (Jr.)
2021	Aleem Ford	SF	United States	Wisconsin (Sr.)
2021	Marcus Garrett	PG	United States	Kansas (Sr.)
2021	Jordan Goodwin	SG	United States	Saint Louis (Sr.)
2021	Sam Hauser	SF	United States	Virginia (Sr.)
2021	Aaron Henry	SF	United States	Michigan State (Jr.)
2021	Jay Huff	C	United States	Virginia (Sr.)
2021	Feron Hunt	SF	United States	SMU (Jr.)
2021	Matthew Hurt	PF	United States	Duke (So.)
2021	DeJon Jarreau	PG/SG	United States	Houston (Sr.)
2021	Carlik Jones	PG	United States; South Sudan	Louisville (Sr.)
2021	AJ Lawson	SG	Canada	South Carolina (Jr.)
2021	Mac McClung	PG	United States	Texas Tech (Jr.)
2021	JaQuori McLaughlin	PG	United States	UC Santa Barbara (Sr.)
2021	RJ Nembhard	SG	United States	TCU (Sr.)
2021	Daishen Nix	PG	United States	NBA G League Ignite (NBA G League)
2021	Eugene Omoruyi	SF	Canada	Oregon (Sr.)
2021	Jamorko Pickett	SF	United States	Georgetown (Sr.)
2021	Yves Pons	PF	France	Tennessee (Sr.)
2021	Micah Potter	PF/C	United States	Wisconsin (Sr.)
2021	Austin Reaves	SG	United States	Oklahoma (Sr.)
2021	Alex Reese	PF/C	United States	Alabama (Sr.)
2021	Olivier Sarr	C	France	Kentucky (Sr.)
2021	Jordan Schakel	SG/SF	United States	San Diego State (Sr.)
2021	Javonte Smart	PG	United States	LSU (Jr.)
2021	Dru Smith	SG	United States	Missouri (Sr.)
2021	Terry Taylor	SF	United States	Austin Peay (Sr.)
2021	Ethan Thompson	SG	Puerto Rico	Oregon State (Sr.)
2021	M. J. Walker	SG	United States	Florida State (Sr.)
2021	Keaton Wallace	PG/SG	United States	UTSA (Sr.)
2021	Duane Washington Jr.	PG/SG	United States	Ohio State (Jr.)
2021	Trendon Watford	PF	United States	LSU (So.)
2021	Phillip Wheeler	SF	United States	Ranney School
2021	Brandon Williams	PG	United States	Arizona (So.)
2021	McKinley Wright IV	PG	United States	Colorado (Sr.)
2021	Moses Wright	PF	United States	Georgia Tech (Sr.)
2022	Ibou Badji	C	Senegal	Força Lleida CE (Spain)
2022	Dominick Barlow	SF	United States	Team Overtime (Overtime Elite)
2022	Jules Bernard	PG	United States	UCLA (Sr.)
2022	Buddy Boeheim	SG	United States	Syracuse (Sr.)
2022	Jamaree Bouyea	PG	United States	San Francisco (Sr.)
2022	Izaiah Brockington	SG	United States	Iowa State (Sr.)
2022	John Butler	PF	United States	Florida State (Fr.)
2022	Jamal Cain	SF	United States	Oakland (Sr.)
2022	Julian Champagnie	SG	United States	St. John's (Jr.)
2022	Darius Days	PF	United States	LSU (Sr.)
2022	Henri Drell	SF	Estonia	Victoria Libertas Pesaro (Italy)
2022	Keon Ellis	SG	United States	Alabama (Sr.)
2022	Tyson Etienne	PG	United States	Wichita State (Jr.)
2022	Michael Foster Jr.	PF	United States	NBA G League Ignite (NBA G League)
2022	Javon Freeman-Liberty	SG	United States	DePaul (Sr.)
2022	Collin Gillespie	PG	United States	Villanova (Sr.)
2022	Jacob Gilyard	PG	United States	Richmond (Sr.)
2022	A. J. Green	SG	United States	Northern Iowa (Sr.)
2022	Mouhamadou Gueye	PF	United States	Pittsburgh (Sr.)
2022	Jordan Hall	SF	United States	St. Joseph's (So.)
2022	Ron Harper Jr.	SF	United States	Rutgers (Sr.)
2022	Trevor Hudgins	PG	United States	Northwest Missouri State (Sr.)
2022	Quenton Jackson	PG	United States	Texas A&M (Sr.)
2022	Johnny Juzang	SG	United States	UCLA (Jr.)
2022	Kenneth Lofton Jr.	PF	United States	Louisiana Tech (So.)
2022	Justin Minaya	SF	Dominican Republic; United States	Providence (Sr.)
2022	Tazé Moore	SG	United States	Houston (Sr.)
2022	Alex Morales	SG	Puerto Rico	Wagner (Sr.)
2022	Mãozinha Pereira	PF	Brazil	Basquete Cearense (Brazil)
2022	Scotty Pippen Jr.	PG	United States	Vanderbilt (Jr.)
2022	Daeqwon Plowden	SG	United States	Bowling Green (Sr.)
2022	Lester Quiñones	SG	Dominican Republic; United States	Memphis (Jr.)
2022	Jared Rhoden	SF	United States	Seton Hall (Sr.)
2022	Orlando Robinson	PF	United States	Fresno State (Jr.)
2022	Jermaine Samuels	SF	United States	Villanova (Sr.)
2022	Dereon Seabron	SG	United States	NC State (So.)
2022	Jaylen Sims	SG	United States	UNC Wilmington (Sr.)
2022	Cole Swider	PF	United States	Syracuse (Sr.)
2022	Stanley Umude	SG	United States	Arkansas (Sr.)
2022	Alondes Williams	PG	United States	Wake Forest (Sr.)
2022	Donovan Williams	SG	United States	UNLV (Jr.)
2022	Nate Williams	SG	United States	Buffalo (Sr.)
2022	Malik Williams	PF/C	United States	Louisville (Sr.)
2022	Lucas Williamson	PG	United States	Loyola-Chicago (Sr.)
2023	Timmy Allen	SF	United States	Texas (Sr.)
2023	Marcus Bagley	PF	United States	Arizona State (Jr.)
2023	Damion Baugh	SG	United States	TCU (Sr.)
2023	Leaky Black	SF	United States	North Carolina (Sr.)
2023	Colin Castleton	C	United States	Florida (Sr.)
2023	Malcolm Cazalon	PG	France	Mega Leks (Serbia)
2023	Yuri Collins	PG	United States	Saint Louis (Sr.)
2023	Javonte Cooke	PG	United States	Winston-Salem State (Sr.)
2023	Ricky Council IV	SG	United States	Arkansas (Jr.)
2023	Dexter Dennis	SF	United States	Texas A&M (Sr.)
2023	Tosan Evbuomwan	SF	United Kingdom; England	Princeton (Sr.)
2023	Adam Flagler	SG	United States	Baylor (Sr.)
2023	Alex Fudge	SF/PF	United States	Florida (So.)
2023	Andrew Funk	SG	United States	Penn State (Sr.)
2023	Myron Gardner	SG	United States	Little Rock (Sr.)
2023	Jazian Gortman	PG	United States	YNG Dreamerz (Overtime Elite)
2023	Elijah Harkless	SG	United States	UNLV (Sr.)
2023	D'Moi Hodge	SG	British Virgin Islands	Missouri (Sr.)
2023	Trey Jemison	C	United States	UAB (Sr.)
2023	Yuki Kawamura	PG	Japan	Yokohama B-Corsairs (Japan)
2023	Jaylen Martin	SF	United States	YNG Dreamerz (Overtime Elite)
2023	Nathan Mensah	PF	Ghana	San Diego State (Sr.)
2023	Pete Nance	PF	United States	North Carolina (Sr.)
2023	Miles Norris	SF/PF	United States	UC Santa Barbara (Sr.)
2023	Markquis Nowell	PG	United States	Kansas State (Sr.)
2023	Drew Peterson	PF	United States	USC (Sr.)
2023	Craig Porter Jr.	PG	United States	Wichita State (Sr.)
2023	Liam Robbins	C	United States	Vanderbilt (Sr.)
2023	Adama Sanogo	PF/C	Mali	UConn (Jr.)
2023	Malachi Smith	SG	United States	Gonzaga (Sr.)
2023	Terquavion Smith	PG	United States	NC State (So.)
2023	Drew Timme	C	United States	Gonzaga (Sr.)
2023	Jacob Toppin	SF	United States	Kentucky (Sr.)
2023	Oscar Tshiebwe	C	Democratic Republic of the Congo	Kentucky (Sr.)
2024	Trey Alexander	SG	United States	Creighton (Jr.)
2024	Jamison Battle	SF	United States	Ohio State (Sr.)
2024	Reece Beekman	PG	United States	Virginia (Sr.)
2024	Jalen Bridges	SF	United States	Baylor (Sr.)
2024	Keion Brooks Jr.	SF/PF	United States	Washington (Sr.)
2024	Darius Brown	PG/SG	United States	Utah State (Sr.)
2024	Tyler Burton	SF	United States	Villanova (Sr.)
2024	Branden Carlson	C	United States	Utah (Sr.)
2024	Isaiah Crawford	SF	United States	Louisiana Tech (Sr.)
2024	Cui Yongxi	SG	China	Guangzhou Loong Lions (China)
2024	N'Faly Dante	C	Mali	Oregon (Sr.)
2024	RayJ Dennis	PG	United States	Baylor (Sr.)
2024	Alex Ducas	SG/SF	Australia	Saint Mary's (Sr.)
2024	Jesse Edwards	C	Netherlands	West Virginia (Sr.)
2024	Justin Edwards	SF	United States	Kentucky (Fr.)
2024	Tristan Enaruna	SF	Netherlands	Cleveland State (Sr.)
2024	Trentyn Flowers	SF	United States	Adelaide 36ers (Australia)
2024	PJ Hall	C	United States	Clemson (Sr.)
2024	Blake Hinson	SF	United States	Pittsburgh (Sr.)
2024	Daniss Jenkins	PG	United States	St. John's (Sr.)
2024	Keshad Johnson	SF	United States	Arizona (Sr.)
2024	Isaac Jones	C/PF	United States	Washington State (Sr.)
2024	Spencer Jones	SF	United States	Stanford (Sr.)
2024	David Jones García	SF	Dominican Republic	Memphis (Sr.)
2024	Malevy Leons	PF	Netherlands	Bradley (Sr.)
2024	Emanuel Miller	SF/PF	Canada	TCU (Sr.)
2024	Riley Minix	SF/SG	United States	Morehead State (Sr.)
2024	Josh Oduro	PF/C	United States	Providence (Sr.)
2024	Quincy Olivari	PG	United States	Xavier (Sr.)
2024	Zyon Pullin	PG	United States	Florida (Sr.)
2024	Cormac Ryan	SG	United States	North Carolina (Sr.)
2024	Tolu Smith	PF	United States	Mississippi State (Sr.)
2024	Isaiah Stevens	PG	United States	Colorado State (Sr.)
2024	Nae'Qwan Tomlin	PF	United States	Kansas State (Sr.)
2024	Armel Traoré	SF	France	ADA Blois (France)
2024	Jahmir Young	PG	United States	Maryland (Sr.)
2025	Adama Bal	G/F	France	Santa Clara (Sr.)
2025	Dylan Cardwell	C	United States	Auburn (Sr.)
2025	Moussa Cissé	C	Guinea	Memphis (Sr.)
2025	LJ Cryer	PG	United States	Houston (Sr.)
2025	Hunter Dickinson	C	United States	Michigan (Sr.)
2025	Andersson Garcia	SF	Dominican Republic	Texas A&M (Sr.)
2025	Keshon Gilbert	PG	United States	Iowa State (Sr.)
2025	Vladislav Goldin	C	Russia	Michigan (Sr.)
2025	Hayden Gray	PG/SG	United States	UC San Diego (Sr.)
2025	Chucky Hepburn	PG	United States	Louisville (Sr.)
2025	C. J. Huntley	PF	United States	Appalachian State (Sr.)
2025	Chaney Johnson	SF	United States	Auburn (Sr.)
2025	Curtis Jones	SG	United States	Iowa State (Sr.)
2025	Miles Kelly	SG	United States	Auburn (Sr.)
2025	Jayson Kent	SF	United States	Texas (Sr.)
2025	Caleb Love	PG	United States	Arizona (Sr.)
2025	Lawson Lovering	C	United States	Utah (Sr.)
2025	Chris Mañon	SG	United States	Vanderbilt (Sr.)
2025	Bez Mbeng	SG	United States	Yale (Sr.)
2025	Grant Nelson	PF	United States	Alabama (Sr.)
2025	Ryan Nembhard	PG	Canada	Gonzaga (Sr.)
2025	Toby Okani	SG	United States	West Virginia (Sr.)
2025	Norchad Omier	PF	Nicaragua	Baylor (Sr.)
2025	Sean Pedulla	PG	United States	Ole Miss (Sr.)
2025	John Poulakidas	SG	United States	Yale (Sr.)
2025	Julian Reese	PF	United States	Maryland (Sr.)
2025	Kadary Richmond	PG/SG	United States	St. John's (Sr.)
2025	Hunter Sallis	SG	United States	Wake Forest (Sr.)
2025	Payton Sandfort	SF	United States	Iowa (Sr.)
2025	Mark Sears	PG	United States	Alabama (Sr.)
2025	Jahmyl Telfort	SF	Canada	Butler (Sr.)
2025	Chris Youngblood	SG	United States	Alabama (Sr.)

== Professional players before/around the BAA's debut ==
The following players had previously played professional basketball before or around the inception of the Basketball Association of America (now NBA) but had played for the BAA/NBA at least once afterward.

Year first played	Player	Pos.	Nationality	School	First professional team	Last team before entering the BAA/NBA
1921	Nat Hickey	SG/SF	United States; Austria-Hungary; Croatia	Dayton (Sr.)	Hoboken St. Joseph's	Tri-Cities Blackhawks (NBL)
1933	Charley Shipp	SG/SF	United States	Catholic University of America (So.)	Indianapolis Pros	Waterloo Hawks (NBL)
1934	Jake Pelkington	SG/SF	United States	Manhattan (Fr.)	Brooklyn Visitations (ABL)	Fort Wayne Zollner Pistons (NBL)
1938	Mike Bloom	PF/C	United States	Temple (Sr.)	Philadelphia Sphas (ABL)	Baltimore Bullets (ABL)
1939	Dale Hamilton	PG/SG	United States	Franklin College (Indiana) (Fr.)	Hammond Ciesar All-Americans (NBL)	Waterloo Hawks (NBL)
1939	Mike Novak	C	United States	Loyola (Illinois) (Jr.)	Chicago Harmons (WPBT)	Syracuse Nationals (NBL)
1939	Don Otten	C	United States	Bowling Green (Sr.)	Zanesfield Independents	Tri-Cities Blackhawks (NBL)
1940	Bob Carpenter	PF/C	United States	East Texas State (Sr.)	Oshkosh All-Stars (NBL)	Oshkosh All-Stars (NBL)
1940	Herm Fuetsch	PG	United States	San Francisco Polytechnic (California) (HS Sr.)	San Francisco Olympic Club (AAU)	Baltimore Bullets (ABL)
1940	Ed Stanczak	PG/SG	United States	Central (Indiana) (HS Sr.)	Marion Draper Brothers	Anderson Duffey Packers (NBL)
1941	Curly Armstrong	PG	United States	Indiana (Sr.)	Fort Wayne Zollner Pistons (NBL)	Fort Wayne Zollner Pistons (NBL)
1941	Gene Englund	SG/SF	United States	Wisconsin (Sr.)	Oshkosh All-Stars (NBL)	Oshkosh All-Stars (NBL)
1941	George Glamack	PF/C	United States	North Carolina (Sr.)	Akron Goodyear Wingfoots (NBL)	Indianapolis Kautskys (NBL)
1941	Herm Schaefer	SG/SF	United States	Indiana (Sr.)	Fort Wayne Zollner Pistons (NBL)	Minneapolis Lakers (NBL)
1941	Carlisle Towery	PF/C	United States	Western Kentucky (Sr.)	Fort Wayne Zollner Pistons (NBL)	Fort Wayne Zollner Pistons (NBL)
1942	Hank DeZonie	SF/PF	United States	Clark University (Fr.)	New York Rens (WPBT)	New York Harlem Yankees (ABL)
1942	Red Klotz	PG	United States	Villanova (So.)	Philadelphia Sphas (ABL)	Philadelphia Sphas (ABL)
1942	Chet McNabb	SF	United States	Arizona State (Jr.)	Tolleson Merchants	Phoenix Funk Jewels
1942	Chips Sobek	PG	United States	Notre Dame (Sr.)	Naval Station Great Lakes	Hammond Calumet Buccaneers (NBL)
1942	Hal Tidrick	PG/SG	United States	Washington & Jefferson College (Sr.)	Dayton Dive Bombers	Toledo Jeeps (NBL)
1942	Clint Wager	PF/C	United States	St. Mary's (Minnesota) (Sr.)	Chicago Bruins (WPBT)	Hammond Calumet Buccaneers (NBL)
1943	Gale Bishop	SF	United States	Washington State (Sr.)	Bellingham Fircrest Dairy (AAU)	Bellingham Fircrests (PCBL)
1943	Andrew Levane	SG	United States	St. John's (Sr.)	New York Americans (ABL)	Rochester Royals (NBL)
1943	Al Lucas	SG/SF	United States	Fordham (Fr.)	Arma AC	Sheboygan Red Skins (NBL)
1943	Richie Niemiera	PG/SG	United States	Notre Dame (Jr.)	Camp Grant	Fort Wayne Zollner Pistons (NBL)
1943	Bob Tough	SG/SF	United States	St. John's (So.)	Brooklyn Eagles (ABL)	Fort Wayne Zollner Pistons (NBL)
1944	Bill Downey	C	United States	Marquette (So.)	Naval Station Great Lakes	Naval Station Great Lakes
1944	Bruce Hale	SG/SF	United States	Santa Clara (Jr.)	Dayton Acmes	Indianapolis Kautskys (NBL)
1944	Stan Patrick	SG/SF	United States	Illinois (Sr.)	Chicago American Gears (NBL)	Hammond Calumet Buccaneers (NBL)
1944	Howie Rader	PG/SG	United States	Long Island (Sr.)	Philadelphia Sphas (ABL)	Tri-Cities Blackhawks (NBL)
1944	Dick Triptow	SG/SF	United States	DePaul (Sr.)	Chicago American Gears (NBL)	Fort Wayne Zollner Pistons (NBL)
1945	Price Brookfield	SG/SF	United States	Iowa State (Sr.)	Baltimore Bullets (ABL)	Anderson Duffey Packers (NBL)
1945	Lonnie Eggleston	PG	United States	Oklahoma A&M (Sr.)	Bartlesville Phillips 66ers (AAU)	Oklahoma City Drillers (PBLA)
1945	Don Grate	SG/SF	United States	Ohio State (Sr.)	Columbus All-Stars	Indianapolis Kautskys (NBL)
1945	Bill Henry	C	United States	Rice (Sr.)	Houston Mavericks (PBLA)	Houston Mavericks (PBLA)
1945	Red Holzman	PG	United States	City College of New York (Sr.)	New York Gothams (ABL)	Rochester Royals (NBL)
1945	Bob Kinney	PF/C	United States	Rice (Sr.)	Fort Wayne Zollner Pistons (NBL)	Fort Wayne Zollner Pistons (NBL)
1945	Milo Komenich	PF/C	United States	Wyoming (Sr.)	Hollywood 20th Century Fox (AAU)	Anderson Duffey Packers (NBL)
1945	Fred Lewis	SG/SF	United States	Eastern Kentucky (Sr.)	Sheboygan Red Skins (NBL)	Indianapolis Kautskys (NBL)
1946	Stan Brown	SF	United States	South Philadelphia (Pennsylvania) (HS Jr.)	Philadelphia Sphas (ABL)	Philadelphia Sphas (ABL)
1946	John Chaney	SG/SF	United States	LSU (Sr.)	Syracuse Nationals (NBL)	Syracuse Nationals (NBL)
1946	Bill Closs	SF	United States	Rice (Sr.)	Indianapolis Kautskys (NBL)	Anderson Duffey Packers (NBL)
1946	Frank Gates	PG	United States	Sam Houston State (Sr.)	Anderson Duffey Packers (NBL)	Anderson Duffey Packers (NBL)
1946	Billy Hassett	PG	United States	Notre Dame (Sr.)	Buffalo Bisons (NBL)	Tri-Cities Blackhawks (NBL)
1946	Arnie Johnson	SF/PF	United States	Bemidji State (Sr.)	Rochester Royals (NBL)	Rochester Royals (NBL)
1946	Leo Klier	SG/SF	United States	Notre Dame (Sr.)	Indianapolis Kautskys (NBL)	Indianapolis Kautskys (NBL)
1946	Jack Maddox	SG/SF	United States	West Texas State (Sr.)	Oshkosh All-Stars (NBL)	Hammond Calumet Buccaneers (NBL)
1946	George Mikan	C	United States	DePaul (Sr.)	Chicago American Gears (NBL)	Minneapolis Lakers (NBL)
1946	Max Morris	PF/C	United States	Northwestern (Sr.)	Chicago American Gears (NBL)	Sheboygan Red Skins (NBL)
1946	Bob O'Brien	SF/PF	United States	Pepperdine (So.)	Kansas City Smokies	Birmingham Vulcans (SPBL)
1946	Bill Roberts	C	United States	Wyoming (So.)	Atlanta Crackers (PBLA)	Saratoga Indians (NYSL)
1946	Howie Schultz	SF/PF	United States	Hamline (Sr.)	Anderson Duffey Packers (NBL)	Anderson Duffey Packers (NBL)
1946	Rollie Seltz	PG	United States	Hamline (Sr.)	Anderson Duffey Packers (NBL)	Waterloo Hawks (NBL)
1946	Mel Thurston	PG	United States	Canisius (Sr.)	Buffalo Bisons (NBL)	Tri-Cities Blackhawks (NBL)
1946	Whitey Von Nieda	PG/SG	United States	Penn State (Fr.)	Lancaster Red Roses (EPBL)	Tri-Cities Blackhawks (NBL)

== See also ==
- First overall NBA draft picks
