= Normie =

Normie is a diminutive form of the masculine given name Norman. Notable people and characters with the name include:

== People ==
- Normie Glick (1927–1989), American basketball player
- Norman Himes (1900–1958), Canadian National Hockey League player
- Norman Kwong (1929–2016), Canadian Football League player, businessman and politician
- Normie Rowe (born 1947), Australian pop singer
- Normie Roy (1928–2011), American Major League Baseball pitcher
- Normie Smith (1908–1988), Canadian National Hockey League goaltender

== Fictional characters ==
- Normie Osborn, a Marvel Comics Spider-Man character
