= 1949 BAA draft =

Basketball player selection

General information
- Sport: Basketball
- Date: April 21, 1949
- Location: Commodore Hotel (New York City, New York)

Overview
- 76 total selections in 11 rounds
- League: BAA
- Teams: 11
- Territorial picks: Ed Macauley, St. Louis Bombers; Vern Mikkelsen, Minneapolis Lakers
- First selection: Howie Shannon, Providence Steamrollers
- Hall of Famers: 4: F Ed Macauley; F Vern Mikkelsen; G Dick McGuire; G Slater Martin

The 1949 BAA draft was the third annual draft of the Basketball Association of America (BAA) and the last draft that was done while going under the original Basketball Association of America name before the BAA merged with the National Basketball League to form the National Basketball Association (NBA) on August 3, 1949. The BAA's draft was held on April 21, 1949, months before the start of the 1949–50 NBA season, which debuted the NBA name properly. In this draft, eleven BAA teams took turns selecting amateur U.S. college basketball players. However, one month before the BAA's final draft began, the NBL would end up getting an early jumpstart over the BAA with their own draft by starting their own draft system some time in March 1949. Three of the first round selections made by BAA teams (Alex Groza, Wallace Jones, and Ralph Beard) alongside college teammates Cliff Barker and Joe Holland would all agree to sign with the newly created Indianapolis Olympians expansion franchise, who had been intended to replace the Kautskys in the NBL before ultimately replacing the Jets for the NBA merger. After initial disagreements made from the previous year, the BAA and NBL would reconcile their differences after the BAA draft ended and eventually agreed to a merger on August 3, 1949, with the aforementioned Indianapolis Jets and Providence Steamrollers being left out on the BAA's side and the Oshkosh All-Stars, Hammond Calumet Buccaneers, and Dayton Rens being left out on the NBL's side; this merger would now leave players with few alternative methods to enter the soon-to-be-renamed NBA draft going forward, since direct competition for payment between the two professional leagues was now essentially replaced by Amateur Athletic Union basketball, minor league basketball, and various barnstorming teams if players wanted to work before entering the draft system. During the draft, three teams agreed to give up certain draft picks in order to secure the player rights to underclassmen that left college, but already signed and played for the BAA the previous season, with Howie Shannon being considered the #1 pick by default for the Providence Steamrollers, George Kaftan being #4 for the Boston Celtics, and 1949 Rookie of the Year Harry Gallatin being #20 for the New York Knicks. The 76 players selected was one number higher to the number of players selected in the 1988 NBA draft; both drafts have had some of the fewest picks selected prior to 1989 (when the NBA draft was reduced to two rounds ever since).

== Draft selections and draftee career notes ==
Howie Shannon from Kansas State University was selected first overall by the Providence Steamrollers. However, Ed Macauley and Vern Mikkelsen were selected before the draft as St. Louis Bombers' and Minneapolis Lakers' territorial picks respectively. Not only that, but Shannon would also join George Kaftan of the Boston Celtics and Harry Gallatin of the New York Knicks as three BAA/NBA draft picks where they would be drafted in this year's draft, but played in the previous BAA season with the same team that drafted them earlier on. Four players from this draft, Vern Mikkelsen, Ed Macauley, Dick McGuire and Slater Martin have been inducted into the Basketball Hall of Fame.

== Key ==
Pos.	G	F	C
Position	Guard	Forward	Center

^	Denotes player who has been inducted to the Naismith Memorial Basketball Hall of Fame
*	Denotes player who has been selected for at least one All-Star Game and All-NBA Team
^{+}	Denotes player who has been selected for at least one All-Star Game
^{#}	Denotes player who has never appeared in an NBA regular-season or playoff game
^{~}	Denotes player who has been selected as Rookie of the Year

== Draft ==
Round	Pick	Player	Position	Nationality (Note: Nationality indicates the player's national team or representative nationality. If a player has not competed at the international level, then the nationality indicates the national team which the player is eligible to represent according to FIBA rules.)	Team	College / Club
T	–	Ed Macauley^	F/C	United States	St. Louis Bombers	Saint Louis
T	–	Vern Mikkelsen^	F/C	United States	Minneapolis Lakers	Hamline
1	1	Howie Shannon^{~}	G/F	United States	Providence Steamrollers	Providence Steamrollers (BAA)
1	2	Alex Groza*^{~}	C	United States	Indianapolis Jets	Kentucky
1	3	Bob Harris	F/C	United States	Fort Wayne Pistons	Oklahoma State
1	4	Tony Lavelli	F	United States	Boston Celtics	Yale
1	5	Vern Gardner	F/C	United States	Philadelphia Warriors	Utah
1	6	Ron Livingstone	C	United States	Baltimore Bullets	Wyoming
1	7	Dick McGuire^	G	United States	New York Knicks	St. John's
1	8	Wallace Jones	F	United States	Washington Capitols	Kentucky
1	9	Jack Kerris	F/C	United States	Chicago Stags	Loyola (IL)
1	10	Frank Saul	G/F	United States	Rochester Royals	Seton Hall
2	–	Leo Barnhorst^{+}	G/F	United States	Indianapolis Jets	Notre Dame
2	–	Ralph Beard*	G	United States	Chicago Stags	Kentucky
2	–	Jack Coleman^{+}	F/C	United States	Rochester Royals	Louisville
2	–	Harry Donovan	G	United States	New York Knicks	Muhlenberg
2	–	George Kaftan	F	United States	Boston Celtics	Boston Celtics (BAA)
2	–	Jim Nolan	C	United States	Philadelphia Warriors	Georgia Tech
2	–	John Oldham	G	United States	Fort Wayne Pistons	Western Kentucky
2	–	Johnny Orr	F	United States	St. Louis Bombers	Beloit
2	–	Red Owens	G	United States	Washington Capitols	Baylor

== Other picks ==
The following list includes other draft picks who have appeared in at least one NBA game.

Round	Pick	Player	Position	Nationality	Team	College
3	–	Nelson Bobb	G	United States	Philadelphia Warriors	Temple
3	–	Dwight Eddleman^{+}	G/F	United States	Chicago Stags	Illinois
3	–	Paul Gordon	F	United States	Baltimore Bullets	Notre Dame
3	–	Ed Leede	G/F	United States	Providence Steamrollers	Dartmouth
3	–	Joe Mullaney	G	United States	Boston Celtics	Holy Cross
3	–	Mac Otten	F/C	United States	Indianapolis Jets	Bowling Green
3	–	Fred Schaus*	F	United States	Fort Wayne Pistons	West Virginia
3	–	Ernie Vandeweghe	G/F	United States; Canada	New York Knicks	Colgate
3	–	Slater Martin^	G	United States	Minneapolis Lakers	Texas
4	–	Bob Evans	G	United States	Indianapolis Jets	Butler
4	–	Jerry Nagel	G	United States	Fort Wayne Pistons	Loyola (IL)
4	–	Warren Perkins	G/F	United States	Providence Steamrollers	Tulane
5	–	Cliff Barker	G	United States	Washington Capitols	Kentucky
5	–	Ray Corley	G	United States	Providence Steamrollers	Georgetown
5	–	Earl Dodd	F	United States	St. Louis Bombers	Northeast Missouri
6	–	Don Boven	G/F	United States	Indianapolis Jets	Western Michigan
7	–	John Pritchard	C	United States	St. Louis Bombers	Drake
8	–	Duane Klueh	G	United States	Boston Celtics	Indiana State
8	–	Bob Royer	G	United States	Providence Steamrollers	Indiana State
–	–	Mal McMullen	C	United States	Baltimore Bullets	Xavier
–	–	Bob Harrison^{+}	G	United States	Minneapolis Lakers	Michigan
–	–	Paul Walther^{+}	G/F	United States	Minneapolis Lakers	Tennessee
–	–	Marv Schatzman	F	United States	St. Louis Bombers	Saint Louis

== Undrafted players ==
These players were not selected in the 1949 draft but played at least one game in the NBA.

Player	Pos.	Nationality	School/club team
Edward Bartels	SG/SF	United States	NC State (Jr.)
Vince Boryla	SF/PF	United States	Denver (Sr.)
Joe Bradley	SG	United States	Oklahoma A&M (Sr.)
Bob Brown	SF	United States	Miami (Ohio) (Sr.)
Leroy Chollet	SG/SF	United States	Canisius (Sr.)
Joe Dolhon	PG	United States	NYU (Jr.)
George Feigenbaum	PG	United States	Long Island (So.)
Normie Glick	SF/PF	United States	Marymount (So.)
Al Guokas	SG/SF	United States	Saint Joseph's (So.)
Bob Hahn	C	United States	NC State (Sr.)
Bob Harrison	PG	United States	Michigan (Sr.)
Bill Herman	SG	United States	Mount Union (Sr.)
Howie Janotta	SF	United States	Seton Hall (Sr.)
Frank Kudelka	SG/SF	United States	Saint Mary's (California) (Jr.)
Mal McMullen	PF/C	United States	Xavier (Jr.)
Al Miksis	C	United States	Western Illinois (Sr.)
Dermie O'Connell	PG	United States	Holy Cross (So.)
Mike O'Neill	SG/SF	United States	California (Sr.)
Charlie Parsley	SG	United States	Western Kentucky (Sr.)
John Payak	SG	United States	Bowling Green (Sr.)
Jack Phelan	SG/SF	United States	DePaul (Sr.)
Marv Schatzman	SF/PF	United States	Saint Louis (So.)
Wayne See	SG	United States	Northern Arizona (Sr.)
Paul Walther	G	United States	Tennessee (Sr.)
Isaac Walthour	PG	United States	Benjamin Franklin (New York) (HS Sr.)
Bob Wood	PG	United States	Northern Illinois (Sr.)

== See also ==
- List of first overall NBA draft picks
- NBA records
