= 1949–50 Baltimore Bullets season =

- Head coach: Buddy Jeannette
- Arena: Baltimore Coliseum

Results
- Record: 25–43 (.368)
- Place: Division: 5th (Eastern)
- Playoff finish: Did not qualify
- Stats at Basketball Reference
- Radio: WITH

The 1949–50 Baltimore Bullets season was the first season of the Maryland club in the newly formed National Basketball Association and sixth overall season of existence including multiple other leagues. Coming from two out of three successful seasons in the American Basketball League, including a championship in 1946, and two successful seasons in the BAA, including a championship run in 1948, their 25–43 record this time around would not be sufficient for them to reach the division playoffs. Another change from the previous year was president Robert "Jake" Embry's decision not to televise the Bullets' games. The club would change hands towards the end of the season, to a group of local businessmen.

== BAA/NBA Draft ==
Round	Pick	Player	Position	Nationality	College
1	6	Ron Livingstone	C	United States	Wyoming
3	–	Paul Gordon	F	United States	Notre Dame
–	–	Bill Evans	–	United States	Drake
–	45	Tom Gallagher	–	United States	St. Francis (NY)
–	–	Jim McMullen	–	United States	Xavier
–	–	Eppa Rixey	–	United States	Kenyon
–	–	Roger Wiley	–	United States	Oregon
–	–	Bill Zipple	–	United States	Lafayette

== Roster ==
1949–50 Baltimore Bullets roster
Players

Pos.	No.	Player	Height	Weight	DOB	From
F/C	12	Walt Budko	6 ft 5 in (1.96 m)	220 lb (100 kg)		Columbia
G/F	11	Tommy Byrnes	6 ft 3 in (1.91 m)	175 lb (79 kg)		Seton Hall
G/F		Paul Cloyd	6 ft 2 in (1.88 m)	180 lb (82 kg)		Wisconsin
G	4, 5	Joe Dolhon	6 ft 0 in (1.83 m)	175 lb (79 kg)		NYU
G/F	6, 20	Johnny Ezersky	6 ft 3 in (1.91 m)	175 lb (79 kg)		Rhode Island
G		George Feigenbaum	6 ft 1 in (1.85 m)	185 lb (84 kg)		Kentucky
F	6	Paul Gordon	6 ft 3 in (1.91 m)	185 lb (84 kg)		Notre Dame
G/F	11	Paul Hoffman	6 ft 2 in (1.88 m)	195 lb (88 kg)		Purdue
F		Howie Janotta	6 ft 3 in (1.91 m)	185 lb (84 kg)		Seton Hall
G	6, 14	Buddy Jeannette	5 ft 11 in (1.80 m)	175 lb (79 kg)		Washington & Jefferson
C	19	Lee Knorek	6 ft 7 in (2.01 m)	215 lb (98 kg)		Detroit Mercy
G/F	20	Fred Lewis	6 ft 2 in (1.88 m)	195 lb (88 kg)		Eastern Kentucky
C	17	Ron Livingstone	6 ft 10 in (2.08 m)	220 lb (100 kg)		Wyoming
F/C	17	John Mandic	6 ft 4 in (1.93 m)	205 lb (93 kg)		Oregon State
G	17	Mike McCarron	5 ft 11 in (1.80 m)	180 lb (82 kg)		Seton Hall
G	15	Andy O'Donnell	6 ft 1 in (1.85 m)	180 lb (82 kg)		Loyola (MD)
F/C	35	Les Pugh	6 ft 7 in (2.01 m)	190 lb (86 kg)		Ohio State
C	9, 17	Ed Sadowski	6 ft 5 in (1.96 m)	240 lb (109 kg)		Seton Hall
F	4, 8	Marv Schatzman	6 ft 5 in (1.96 m)	200 lb (91 kg)		Saint Louis
G/F	7	Bob Tough	6 ft 0 in (1.83 m)	185 lb (84 kg)		St. John's
F/C	10	Carlisle Towery	6 ft 4 in (1.93 m)	210 lb (95 kg)		Western Kentucky
G/F	5	Dick Triptow	6 ft 0 in (1.83 m)	170 lb (77 kg)		DePaul
G/F	4	Whitey Von Nieda	6 ft 1 in (1.85 m)	170 lb (77 kg)		Penn State

Coaches
Head coach
- Buddy Jeannette
  (Washington & Jefferson)

Legend
- (DP) Unsigned draft pick
- (FA) Free agent
- (S) Suspended
- Injured

== Pre-season ==
1949 Pre-season game log: 4-4
#	Date	Opponent	Score	Location	Record
1	October 17	Syracuse Nationals	W 66-63	Baltimore Coliseum	1-0
2	October 18	Syracuse Nationals	L 56-62	Baltimore Coliseum	1-1
3	October 22	Philadelphia Warriors	L 74-82	Baltimore Coliseum	1-2
4	October 24	Cumberland Dukes	W 59-57	Baltimore Coliseum	2-2
5	October 26	Boston Celtics	W 66-65	Burlington, Vermont	3-2
6	October 27	Hartford Hurricanes	W 80-74	Hartford, Connecticut	4-2
7	October 29	Boston Celtics	L 72-74	Providence, Rhode Island	4-3
8	October 30	Bridgeport Aer-A-Sols	L 54-56	Bridgeport, Connecticut	4-4

== Regular season ==
=== Season standings ===
Eastern Division	W	L	PCT	GB	Home	Road	Neutral	Div
x-Syracuse Nationals	51	13	.797	–	31–1	15–12	5–0	9–1
x-New York Knicks	40	28	.588	13	19–10	18–16	3–2	20–6
x-Washington Capitols	32	36	.471	21	21–13	10–20	1–3	13–13
x-Philadelphia Warriors	26	42	.382	25	15–15	8–23	3–4	9–17
Baltimore Bullets	25	43	.368	26	16–15	8–25	1–3	8–18
Boston Celtics	22	46	.324	29	12–14	5–28	5–4	11–15

=== Game log ===
1949–50 game log
#	Date	Opponent	Score	High points	Record
1	November 2	at Washington	61–66	Paul Hoffman (17)	0–1
2	November 3	St. Louis	65–81	Paul Hoffman (17)	0–2
3	November 5	Minneapolis	77–92	Paul Hoffman (16)	0–3
4	November 10	Washington	72–88	Hoffman, Towery (14)	0–4
5	November 12	Fort Wayne	82–75	Paul Hoffman (24)	1–4
6	November 15	at Boston	81–76	Paul Hoffman (27)	2–4
7	November 17	Denver	86–71	Paul Hoffman (15)	3–4
8	November 19	Boston	82–91	Hoffman, Jeannette (14)	3–5
9	November 20	at Sheboygan	97–92	Paul Hoffman (19)	4–5
10	November 23	at Minneapolis	71–84	Paul Hoffman (19)	4–6
11	November 24	at St. Louis	65–53	Carlisle Towery (14)	5–6
12	November 27	at Denver	61–68	Les Pugh (16)	5–7
13	November 30	at Chicago	50–57	Paul Hoffman (18)	5–8
14	December 1	Rochester	70–64	Carlisle Towery (19)	6–8
15	December 3	at New York	55–85	Pugh, Towery (11)	6–9
16	December 7	Chicago	72–84	Paul Hoffman (13)	6–10
17	December 8	New York	60–82	Ed Sadowski (12)	6–11
18	December 10	St. Louis	69–66	Byrnes, Towery (14)	7–11
19	December 15	Minneapolis	87–68	Ed Sadowski (21)	8–11
20	December 16	vs Waterloo	75–77	Ed Sadowski (20)	8–12
21	December 17	at Washington	89–72	Paul Hoffman (18)	9–12
22	December 18	at Fort Wayne	95–106	Ed Sadowski (30)	9–13
23	December 20	at Indianapolis	88–79	Paul Hoffman (23)	10–13
24	December 21	at Philadelphia	60–70	Ed Sadowski (17)	10–14
25	December 22	Washington	86–82	Walt Budko (18)	11–14
26	December 25	Philadelphia	63–64	Dolhon, Sadowski (14)	11–15
27	December 26	vs Boston	57–82	Sadowski, Towery (11)	11–16
28	December 28	at Minneapolis	77–88	Walt Budko (19)	11–17
29	December 29	at St. Louis	63–90	Les Pugh (15)	11–18
30	January 1	at Tri-Cities	66–79	Walt Budko (14)	11–19
31	January 2	at Anderson	75–92	Johnny Ezersky (18)	11–20
32	January 5	Rochester	74–71	Ed Sadowski (21)	12–20
33	January 6	at Boston	53–74	Ed Sadowski (11)	12–21
34	January 7	Indianapolis	61–85	Hoffman, Towery (11)	12–22
35	January 10	at Rochester	67–85	Ed Sadowski (16)	12–23
36	January 14	Chicago	78–83	Hoffman, Sadowski (17)	12–24
37	January 19	Washington	68–81	Paul Hoffman (17)	12–25
38	January 21	Philadelphia	68–58	Paul Hoffman (16)	13–25
39	January 22	vs Sheboygan	76–69	Paul Hoffman (18)	14–25
40	January 24	at Rochester	56–70	Paul Hoffman (13)	14–26
41	January 26	New York	77–79 (2OT)	Paul Hoffman (19)	14–27
42	January 27	at Philadelphia	74–71	Ed Sadowski (17)	15–27
43	January 28	Fort Wayne	77–64	Walt Budko (20)	16–27
44	February 2	Rochester	79–69	Ed Sadowski (22)	17–27
45	February 3	vs Chicago	81–98	Ed Sadowski (20)	17–28
46	February 4	Anderson	90–70	Paul Hoffman (18)	18–28
47	February 5	at Syracuse	87–96	Ed Sadowski (24)	18–29
48	February 9	St. Louis	79–67	Walt Budko (16)	19–29
49	February 11	Syracuse	76–77	Paul Hoffman (23)	19–30
50	February 15	at New York	67–80	Paul Hoffman (15)	19–31
51	February 16	Fort Wayne	83–77	Dolhon, Ezersky (16)	20–31
52	February 18	Philadelphia	73–100	Ed Sadowski (18)	20–32
53	February 19	at Fort Wayne	71–79	Paul Hoffman (19)	20–33
54	February 20	at Tri-Cities	73–82	Walt Budko (18)	20–34
55	February 21	at Chicago	64–72	Ed Sadowski (16)	20–35
56	February 22	at Waterloo	84–77	Paul Hoffman (21)	21–35
57	February 24	at Philadelphia	77–69	Joe Dolhon (16)	22–35
58	February 25	Boston	66–82	Ed Sadowski (18)	22–36
59	March 1	at New York	76–82	Paul Hoffman (23)	22–37
60	March 2	Minneapolis	68–88	Paul Hoffman (15)	22–38
61	March 4	Chicago	77–72	Carlisle Towery (14)	23–38
62	March 8	at Washington	80–88	Paul Hoffman (15)	23–39
63	March 9	New York	91–79	Johnny Ezersky (17)	24–39
64	March 11	Boston	79–75	Paul Hoffman (19)	25–39
65	March 12	at Fort Wayne	75–86	Ed Sadowski (17)	25–40
66	March 15	at Minneapolis	62–96	Johnny Ezersky (11)	25–41
67	March 16	at St. Louis	63–71	Paul Hoffman (20)	25–42
68	March 19	at Rochester	66–97	Tommy Byrnes (13)	25–43

== Player statistics ==
Legend
GP	Games played	GS	Games started	MPG	Minutes per game
FG%	Field-goal percentage	3P%	3-point field-goal percentage	FT%	Free-throw percentage
RPG	Rebounds per game	APG	Assists per game	SPG	Steals per game
BPG	Blocks per game	PPG	Points per game

=== Season ===
Player	GP	FG%	FT%	APG	PPG
Walt Budko	66	.304	.757	2.2	9.0
Tommy Byrnes	53	.302	.702	1.7	6.2
Paul Cloyd	3	.125	1.000	0.3	1.7
Joe Dolhon	64	.312	.734	2.4	6.9
Johnny Ezersky	38	.305	.697	1.7	8.1
George Feigenbaum	12	.246	.444	0.8	3.0
Paul Gordon	4	.000	.600	0.8	0.8
Paul Hoffman	60	.341	.665	2.7	14.4
Howie Janotta	9	.300	.813	0.4	3.4
Buddy Jeannette	37	.284	.820	2.5	5.2
Lee Knorek^{X}	1	.000	–	0.0	0.0
Freddie Lewis^{X}	18	.227	.684	1.0	3.5
Ron Livingstone^{X}	16	.245	.761	1.5	5.3
John Mandic^{X}	3	.100	1.000	0.3	1.3
Mike McCarron	3	.200	.667	0.3	1.3
Andy O'Donnell	25	.352	.778	0.7	3.6
Les Pugh^{X}	56	.249	.846	0.3	4.5
Ed Sadowski^{X}	52	.328	.745	1.9	14.0
Marv Schatzman	34	.247	.580	1.1	3.4
Bob Tough	8	.282	.833	0.3	3.4
Carlisle Towery	68	.327	.757	2.1	8.8
Dick Triptow^{X}	4	.000	1.000	0.3	0.5
Whitey Von Nieda^{X}	33	.364	.638	3.2	6.2

^xStatistics with the Baltimore Bullets

== Transactions ==
Players Added

Draft

- Ron Livingstone
- Paul Gordon

Free agency

- Les Pugh (November, 1949)
- John Mandic (January 5, 1950)
Players Lost

Released

- Dick Triptow (December 13, 1949)

Free agency

- Freddie Lewis (December 29, 1949) (to Philadelphia)

=== Trades ===
September 28, 1949	To Baltimore Bullets Cash considerations	To Washington Capitols Chick Reiser
December 5, 1949	To Baltimore Bullets Dick Triptow	To Fort Wayne Pistons Cash considerations
December 7, 1949	To Baltimore Bullets Ed Sadowski Cash considerations	To Philadelphia Warriors Ron Livingstone
December 8, 1949	To Baltimore Bullets Lee Knorek	To New York Knicks Cash considerations
December 9, 1949	To Baltimore Bullets Whitey Von Nieda	To Tri-Cities Blackhawks Cash considerations
