= Paul Gordon (basketball) =

American basketball player (1927–2002)

Personal information
- Born: April 8, 1927 Baltimore, Maryland
- Died: November 2, 2002 (aged 75)
- Listed height: 6 ft 3 in (1.91 m)
- Listed weight: 185 lb (84 kg)

Career information
- High school: Mount Saint Joseph (Baltimore, Maryland)
- College: Notre Dame (1944–1949)
- BAA draft: 1949: 3rd round
- Drafted by: Baltimore Bullets
- Playing career: 1949–1951
- Position: Forward
- Number: 6

Career history
- 1949: Baltimore Bullets
- 1949–1951: Lancaster Rockets

Career highlights
- 2× All-EPBL Second Team (1950, 1951)
- Stats at NBA.com
- Stats at Basketball Reference

Paul Curtis Gordon Jr. (April 8, 1927 – November 2, 2002) was an American professional basketball player. He participated in four games for the Baltimore Bullets of the National Basketball Association (NBA) during the 1949–50 season. He attended University of Notre Dame. Gordon played for the Lancaster Rockets of the Eastern Professional Basketball League (EPBL) and was a two-time All-EPBL Second Team selection.

== NBA career statistics ==
Legend
GP	Games played	FG%	Field-goal percentage
FT%	Free-throw percentage	APG	Assists per game
PPG	Points per game

=== Regular season ===
Year	Team	GP	FG%	FT%	APG	PPG
1949–50	Baltimore	4	.000	.600	.8	.8
Career		4	.000	.600	.8	.8
