= Mike O'Neill (basketball) =

American basketball player (1928–1993)

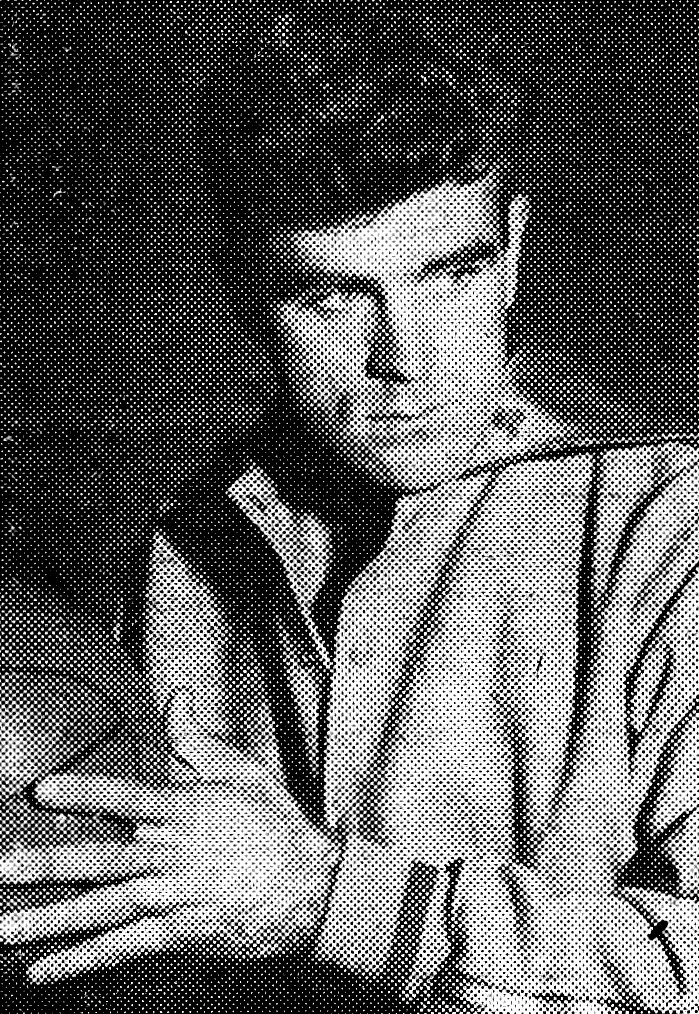
- O'Neill, circa 1954

Personal information
- Born: August 11, 1928 Berkeley, California, U.S.
- Died: March 24, 1993 (aged 64)
- Listed height: 6 ft 3 in (1.91 m)
- Listed weight: 210 lb (95 kg)

Career information
- College: California (1948–1949)
- NBA draft: 1949: undrafted
- Position: Small forward

Career history
- 1949–1952: Oakland Bittners
- 1952: Milwaukee Hawks
- Stats at NBA.com
- Stats at Basketball Reference

Charles Michael O'Neill (August 11, 1928 – March 24, 1993) is an American former professional basketball player. He played in four games for the Milwaukee Hawks of the National Basketball Association (NBA) in 1952–53. He recorded 12 points, nine rebounds, and three assists in his brief career.

== Career statistics ==
Legend
GP	Games played	GS	Games started	MPG	Minutes per game
FG%	Field goal percentage	3P%	3-point field goal percentage	FT%	Free throw percentage
RPG	Rebounds per game	APG	Assists per game	SPG	Steals per game
BPG	Blocks per game	PPG	Points per game	**Bold**	Career high

=== NBA ===
==== Regular season ====
Year	Team	GP	MPG	FG%	FT%	RPG	APG	PPG
1952–53	Milwaukee	4	12.5	.235	1.000	2.3	.8	3.0
