= Bob Hahn =

American basketball player

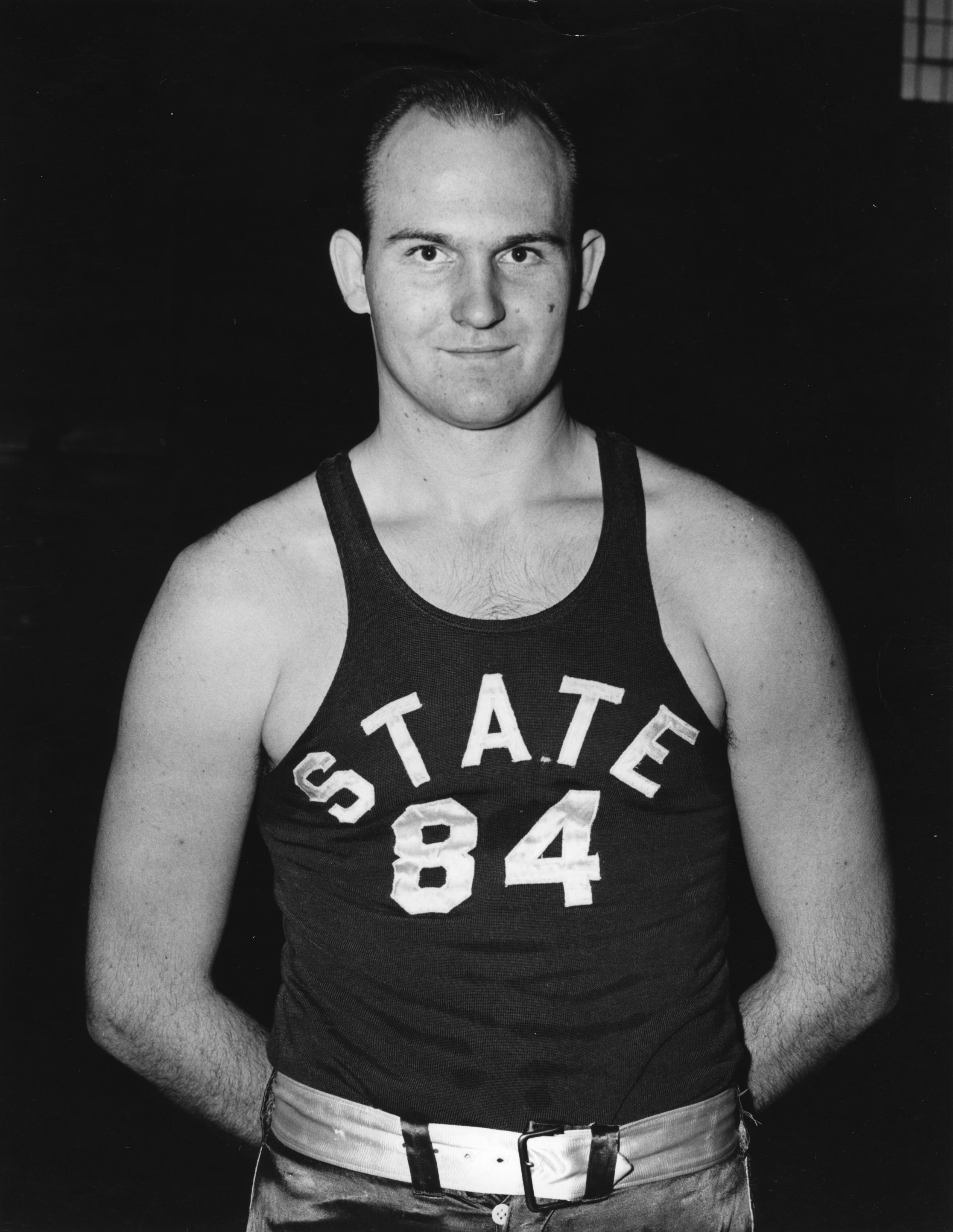
- Hahn at North Carolina State University.

Personal information
- Born: August 25, 1925 Ann Arbor, Michigan, U.S.
- Died: July 28, 2009 (aged 83) Ann Arbor, Michigan, U.S.
- Listed height: 6 ft 10 in (2.08 m)
- Listed weight: 240 lb (109 kg)

Career information
- High school: Ann Arbor (Ann Arbor, Michigan)
- College: NC State (1946–1949)
- BAA draft: 1949: undrafted
- Position: Center
- Number: 9

Career history
- 1949: Chicago Stags
- Stats at NBA.com
- Stats at Basketball Reference

Robert M. Hahn (August 25, 1925 – July 28, 2009) was an American professional basketball player who spent one season in the National Basketball Association (NBA) as a member of the Chicago Stags during the 1949–50 season. He attended North Carolina State University.

== Early life ==
Born to Gustave and Elfreda Hahn, Hahn attended Ann Arbor High School in Ann Arbor, Michigan.

== College career ==
Hahn played college basketball at North Carolina State University. He missed his sophomore year due to academic reasons, but the 6'10 senior returned for the 1948–49 season.

== Professional career ==
Hahn left NC State in 1949 and played for the Chicago Stags in the NBA. Hahn would play just 10 games with Chicago. After his short stint with the Stags, he toured with the Harlem Globetrotters in Europe and Africa. He then returned to Ann Arbor and worked for Sears.

== Personal life ==
He married Joline Howard in 1951. They had one son, Michael Hahn, and four grandchildren. He died in July 2009.

== Career statistics ==
Legend
| GP | Games played | GS | Games started | MPG | Minutes per game |
| FG% | Field goal percentage | 3P% | 3-point field goal percentage | FT% | Free throw percentage |
| RPG | Rebounds per game | APG | Assists per game | SPG | Steals per game |
| BPG | Blocks per game | PPG | Points per game | **Bold** | Career high |

=== NBA ===
==== Regular season ====
| Year | Team | GP | FG% | FT% | APG | PPG |
|---|---|---|---|---|---|---|
| 1949–50 | Tri-Cities | 10 | .308 | .286 | .1 | 1.0 |
