= Howie Janotta =

American basketball player (1924–2010)

Personal information
- Born: October 19, 1924 Hackensack, New Jersey
- Died: November 22, 2010 (aged 86) San Antonio, Texas
- Listed height: 6 ft 3 in (1.91 m)
- Listed weight: 185 lb (84 kg)

Career information
- High school: Lodi (Lodi, New Jersey)
- College: LIU Brooklyn (1942–1943); Seton Hall (1946–1949)
- BAA draft: 1949: undrafted
- Playing career: 1949–1951
- Position: Forward

Career history
- 1949–1950: Baltimore Bullets
- 1950–1951: Paterson Crescents
- Stats at NBA.com
- Stats at Basketball Reference

Howard Janotta (October 19, 1924 – November 22, 2010) was an American professional basketball player. After a collegiate career at Long Island University and then Seton Hall University, Janotta played for the Baltimore Bullets in 9 games during the 1949–50 NBA season.

Born in Hackensack, New Jersey, Janotta grew up in nearby Little Ferry and attended Lodi High School.

From 1993 to 2000, Janotta was actor John Travolta's private airplane pilot.

== NBA career statistics ==
Legend
GP	Games played	FG%	Field-goal percentage
FT%	Free-throw percentage	APG	Assists per game
PPG	Points per game

=== Regular season ===
Year	Team	GP	FG%	FT%	APG	PPG
1949–50	Baltimore	9	.300	.813	.4	3.4
Career		9	.300	.813	.4	3.4
