= Bill Herman =

American basketball player

Personal information
- Born: May 27, 1924 Ohio, U.S.
- Died: June 13, 2010 (aged 86)
- Listed height: 6 ft 3 in (1.91 m)
- Listed weight: 170 lb (77 kg)

Career information
- High school: Dover (Dover, Ohio)
- College: Mount Union (1946–1949)
- NBA draft: 1949: undrafted
- Position: Guard

Career history
- 1950: Denver Nuggets
- Stats at NBA.com
- Stats at Basketball Reference

William Robert Herman (May 17, 1924 – June 13, 2010) was an American professional basketball player who spent one season in the National Basketball Association (NBA) as a member of the Denver Nuggets during the 1949–50 season. He attended Mount Union College.

== Career statistics ==
Legend
| GP | Games played | GS | Games started | MPG | Minutes per game |
| FG% | Field goal percentage | 3P% | 3-point field goal percentage | FT% | Free throw percentage |
| RPG | Rebounds per game | APG | Assists per game | SPG | Steals per game |
| BPG | Blocks per game | PPG | Points per game | **Bold** | Career high |

=== NBA ===
==== Regular season ====
| Year | Team | GP | FG% | FT% | APG | PPG |
|---|---|---|---|---|---|---|
| 1949–50 | Denver | 13 | .385 | .545 | 1.2 | 4.3 |
