= Andy O'Donnell (basketball) =

American basketball player (1925–2019)

Personal information
- Born: March 10, 1925 Freeland, Pennsylvania, U.S.
- Died: April 22, 2019 (aged 94) Allentown, Pennsylvania, U.S.
- Listed height: 6 ft 1 in (1.85 m)
- Listed weight: 180 lb (82 kg)

Career information
- High school: St. Anne's (Freeland, Pennsylvania)
- College: Loyola (Maryland) (1946–1950)
- NBA draft: 1950: undrafted
- Position: Guard
- Number: 15

Career history
- 1950: Baltimore Bullets
- 1950: Carbondale Aces
- 1950–1951: Reading Rangers
- Stats at NBA.com
- Stats at Basketball Reference

Andrew J. O'Donnell Jr. (March 10, 1925 – April 22, 2019) was an American professional basketball player. He played in the National Basketball Association for the Baltimore Bullets during the 1949–50 season, making his debut on January 19, 1950. He was the first Loyola University Maryland player to play in the NBA.

== NBA career statistics ==
Legend
GP	Games played	FG%	Field-goal percentage
FT%	Free-throw percentage	APG	Assists per game
PPG	Points per game

=== Regular season ===
Year	Team	GP	FG%	FT%	APG	PPG
1949–50	Baltimore	25	.352	.778	.7	3.6
Career		25	.352	.778	.7	3.6
