= Bob Wood (basketball) =

American basketball player

Personal information
- Born: October 7, 1921 La Farge, Wisconsin, U.S.
- Died: October 26, 2014 (aged 93) Roscoe, Illinois, U.S.
- Listed height: 5 ft 10 in (1.78 m)
- Listed weight: 175 lb (79 kg)

Career information
- High school: Rockford Central (Rockford, Illinois)
- College: Northern Illinois (1945–1949)
- BAA draft: 1949: undrafted
- Position: Guard
- Number: 4

Career history
- 1949: Sheboygan Red Skins
- Stats at NBA.com
- Stats at Basketball Reference

Robert A. Wood (October 7, 1921 – October 26, 2014) was an American basketball guard who played in the National Basketball Association (NBA). Wood grew up in Rockford, Illinois, he played with the Sheboygan Red Skins during the 1949–50 NBA season. In his one NBA season, Wood averaged 1.2 points per game and 0.2 assists per game.

== Career statistics ==
Legend
GP	Games played	GS	Games started	MPG	Minutes per game
FG%	Field goal percentage	3P%	3-point field goal percentage	FT%	Free throw percentage
RPG	Rebounds per game	APG	Assists per game	SPG	Steals per game
BPG	Blocks per game	PPG	Points per game	**Bold**	Career high

=== NBA ===
==== Regular season ====
Year	Team	GP	FG%	FT%	APG	PPG
1949–50	Sheboygan	6	.214	1.000	.2	1.2
