= Joe Dolhon =

American basketball player

Personal information
- Born: July 9, 1927 Yonkers, New York, U.S.
- Died: January 5, 1981 (aged 53) Westchester County, New York, U.S.
- Listed height: 6 ft 0 in (1.83 m)
- Listed weight: 175 lb (79 kg)

Career information
- High school: Saunders (Yonkers, New York)
- College: NYU (1946–1949)
- BAA draft: 1949: undrafted
- Playing career: 1949–1951
- Position: Guard
- Number: 4, 5

Career history
- 1949–1951: Baltimore Bullets
- Stats at NBA.com
- Stats at Basketball Reference

Joseph Dolhon (July 9, 1927 – January 5, 1981) was an American professional basketball player. He spent two seasons in the National Basketball Association, both with the Baltimore Bullets (1949–51). He attended Saunders Trades and Technical High School in Yonkers, New York and went on to attend New York University.

After retiring from playing professional basketball, he became a teacher in the New York City public school system. He was killed on January 5, 1981, in a car accident in Westchester County, New York.

== NBA career statistics ==
Legend
GP	Games played	FG%	Field-goal percentage
FT%	Free-throw percentage	RPG	Rebounds per game
APG	Assists per game	PPG	Points per game
**Bold**	Career high

=== Regular season ===
Year	Team	GP	FG%	FT%	RPG	APG	PPG
1949–50	Baltimore	**64**	**.312**	.734	–	**2.4**	**6.9**
1950–51	Baltimore	13	.304	**.739**	**1.4**	1.5	3.9
Career		77	.311	.734	1.4	2.3	6.4
