= Dick Triptow =

American basketball player and coach

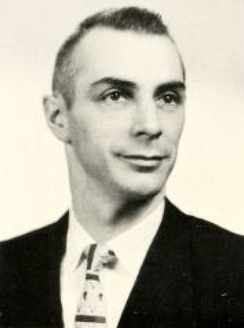
- Triptow from the 1962 Forester

Personal information
- Born: November 3, 1922 Chicago, Illinois, U.S.
- Died: February 20, 2015 (aged 92) Lake Forest, Illinois, U.S.
- Listed height: 6 ft 0 in (1.83 m)
- Listed weight: 170 lb (77 kg)

Career information
- High school: Lane Technical (Chicago, Illinois)
- College: DePaul (1940–1944)
- Playing career: 1944–1949
- Position: Small forward / shooting guard
- Number: 28, 5
- Coaching career: 1959–1973

Career history

Playing
- 1944–1947: Chicago American Gears
- 1947–1948: Fort Wayne Zollner Pistons
- 1948: Tri-Cities Blackhawks
- 1948–1949: Fort Wayne Pistons
- 1949: Baltimore Bullets

Coaching
- 1959–1973: Lake Forest

Career highlights
- NBL champion (1947); All-NBL Second Team (1945); Consensus second-team All-American (1944)
- Stats at NBA.com
- Stats at Basketball Reference

Richard Floyd Triptow Jr. (November 3, 1922 – February 20, 2015) was an American professional basketball player and coach. At 6'0" and 170 pounds, he played as a guard and a forward.

Triptow attended Lane Tech High School and DePaul University, both in Chicago, Illinois. From 1944 to 1949, he played professional basketball in the National Basketball League and National Basketball Association as a member of the Chicago American Gears, the Tri-Cities Blackhawks, the Fort Wayne Zollner Pistons, and the Baltimore Bullets. Playing alongside George Mikan, Triptow won an NBL championship with the Gears in 1947. Triptow coached the Lake Forest College men's basketball team from 1959 to 1973.

In 1997, Triptow wrote a book about his experiences with the Chicago American Gears, called The Dynasty That Never Was (ISBN 0965928004).

== BAA/NBA career statistics ==
Legend
GP	Games played	FG%	Field-goal percentage
FT%	Free-throw percentage	APG	Assists per game
PPG	Points per game	**Bold**	Career high

=== Regular season ===
Year	Team	GP	FG%	FT%	APG	PPG
1948–49	Fort Wayne	**55**	**.278**	.723	**1.7**	**6.1**
1949–50	Baltimore	4	.000	**1.000**	.3	.5
Career		59	.275	.727	1.6	5.7
