= Les Pugh =

American basketball player

Personal information
- Born: September 18, 1923 Butler, Ohio, U.S.
- Died: February 25, 1979 (aged 55) Franklin, Ohio, U.S.
- Listed height: 6 ft 7 in (2.01 m)
- Listed weight: 190 lb (86 kg)

Career information
- High school: Middletown (Middletown, Ohio)
- College: Ohio State (1946–1947)
- BAA draft: 1947: undrafted
- Playing career: 1947–1950
- Position: Power forward / center
- Number: 8, 35

Career history
- 1947–1948: Dayton Metros
- 1948–1949: Providence Steamrollers
- 1949–1950: Baltimore Bullets
- Stats at NBA.com
- Stats at Basketball Reference

Leslie Ellsworth Pugh (September 18, 1923 - February 25, 1979) was an American professional basketball player. He spent one season in the Basketball Association of America (BAA) and one season in the National Basketball Association (NBA) as a member of the Providence Steam Rollers (1948–49) and the Baltimore Bullets (1949–1950). He attended Ohio State University.

== BAA/NBA career statistics ==
Legend
GP	Games played	FG%	Field-goal percentage
FT%	Free-throw percentage	APG	Assists per game
PPG	Points per game	**Bold**	Career high

=== Regular season ===
Year	Team	GP	FG%	FT%	APG	PPG
1948–49	Providence	**60**	**.302**	.749	**1.0**	**7.7**
1949–50	Baltimore	56	.249	**.846**	.3	4.5
Career		116	.285	.792	.6	6.1
