= Marv Schatzman =

American basketball player

Personal information
- Born: February 18, 1927 St. Louis, Missouri, U.S.
- Died: September 19, 2006 (aged 79) St. Louis, Missouri, U.S.
- Listed height: 6 ft 5 in (1.96 m)
- Listed weight: 200 lb (91 kg)

Career information
- High school: Soldan (St. Louis, Missouri)
- College: Saint Louis (1947–1949)
- BAA draft: 1949: -- round, --
- Drafted by: St. Louis Bombers
- Playing career: 1949–1950
- Position: Forward
- Number: 4, 8

Career history
- 1949–1950: Baltimore Bullets
- 1950: Lancaster Rockets

Career highlights
- NIT champion (1948)

Career NBA statistics
- Points: 115 (3.4 ppg)
- Assists: 38 (1.1 apg)
- Stats at NBA.com
- Stats at Basketball Reference

Marvin Joseph Schatzman (February 18, 1927 – September 19, 2006) was an American professional basketball player. Schatzman was selected in the 1949 BAA draft by the St. Louis Bombers after a collegiate career at Saint Louis. He also played one season in the Eastern Professional Basketball League for the Lancaster Rockets.

== NBA career statistics ==
Legend
GP	Games played	FG%	Field-goal percentage
FT%	Free-throw percentage	APG	Assists per game
PPG	Points per game

=== Regular season ===
Year	Team	GP	FG%	FT%	APG	PPG
1949–50	Baltimore	34	.247	.580	1.1	3.4
Career		34	.247	.580	1.1	3.4
