= George Feigenbaum =

American basketball player

Personal information
- Born: July 2, 1929 Binghamton, New York, U.S.
- Died: December 25, 2000 (aged 71)
- Listed height: 6 ft 1 in (1.85 m)
- Listed weight: 185 lb (84 kg)

Career information
- High school: New Utrecht (Brooklyn, New York)
- College: Kentucky; LIU Brooklyn
- BAA draft: 1949: undrafted
- Playing career: 1947–1960
- Position: Point guard

Career history
- 1947–1948: Philadelphia Sphas
- 1948–1949: Trenton Tigers
- 1949–1950: Hartford Hurricanes
- 1949–1950: Baltimore Bullets
- 1950–1951: Allentown / Carbondale Aces
- 1951–1953: Scranton Miners
- 1952: Milwaukee Hawks
- 1956: Hazleton Hawks
- 1956–1959: Wilkes-Barre Barons
- 1959–1960: Hazleton Hawks

Career highlights
- All-EPBL Second Team (1954)
- Stats at NBA.com
- Stats at Basketball Reference

George Feigenbaum (July 2, 1929 – December 25, 2000) was an American professional basketball player. He was a point guard who played two seasons in the National Basketball Association (NBA) as a member of the Baltimore Bullets and the Milwaukee Hawks.

Feigenbaum was born in Binghamton, New York, on July 2, 1929, and was raised in Brooklyn. He graduated from New Utrecht High School where he was named first team All-PSAL and led the league in scoring his senior season. He was recruited to the University of Kentucky basketball team where he played under coach Adolph Rupp. Feigenbaum's college career finished at Long Island University.

Besides his two seasons in the NBA, Feigenbaum also played in the Eastern Professional Basketball League (EPBL) and the American Basketball League (ABA). He was selected to the All-EPBL Second Team while playing for the Williamsport Billies in 1954.

After retiring from professional basketball he started a plumbing company in New York City. He died on December 25, 2000, and was survived by his wife, Francine Feigenbaum, and three children.

== NBA career statistics ==
Legend
GP	Games played	MPG	Minutes per game
FG%	Field-goal percentage	FT%	Free-throw percentage
RPG	Rebounds per game	APG	Assists per game
PPG	Points per game	**Bold**	Career high

=== Regular season ===
Year	Team	GP	MPG	FG%	FT%	RPG	APG	PPG
1949–50	Baltimore	**12**	–	**.246**	.444	–	.8	3.0
1952–53	Milwaukee	5	**15.8**	.182	**.533**	**1.4**	**1.8**	**3.2**
Career		17	15.8	.228	.485	1.4	1.8	3.1
