= Normie Glick =

American basketball player (1927–1989)

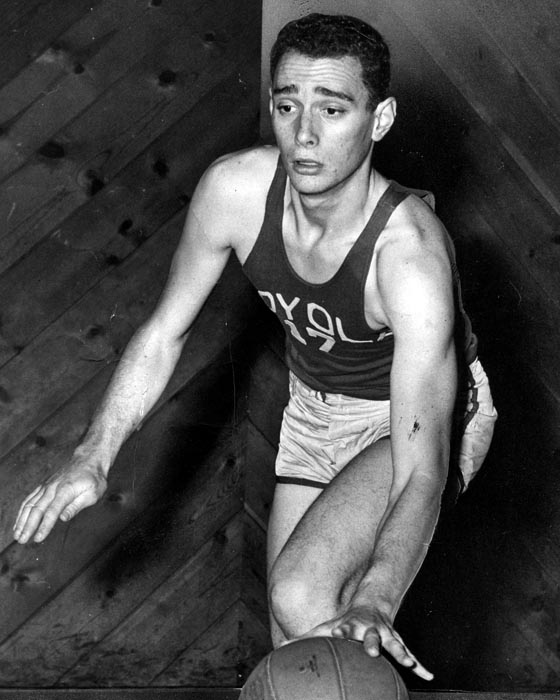
- Glick at Loyola Marymount University.

Personal information
- Born: October 10, 1927 New York City, New York
- Died: March 19, 1989 (aged 61)
- Listed height: 6 ft 7 in (2.01 m)
- Listed weight: 190 lb (86 kg)

Career information
- High school: Taft (New York City, New York); Manual Arts (Los Angeles, California)
- College: Loyola Marymount (1948–1949)
- Position: Forward
- Number: 20

Career history
- 1949: Minneapolis Lakers
- Stats at NBA.com
- Stats at Basketball Reference

Norman Stanley Glick (November 10, 1927 – March 19, 1989) was an American professional basketball player who was a forward for one season in the National Basketball Association (NBA) as a member of the Minneapolis Lakers during the 1949–50 season. He attended Loyola Marymount University.

Glick was born in New York City and played his first three season of high school basketball at William Howard Taft High School before his family moved to Los Angeles and he finished his prep career at Manual Arts High School during the second half of the season. Glick played one varsity season for the Lions before being ruled ineligible due to signing a minor league baseball contract at 16. While his case had been reviewed multiple times and he had been cleared each time, in 1949 the Loyola board of athletic control made the decision that hastened the start of his professional career.

Glick then signed with the Minneapolis Lakers of the NBA. He appeared in the Laker's opening game of the 1949–50 season, scoring two points and committing a personal foul in an 81–69 win over the Philadelphia Warriors. He was released from the team shortly thereafter. Following his brief NBA career, Glick played with the Philadelphia Sphas barnstorming team.

== Career statistics ==
Legend
GP	Games played	GS	Games started	MPG	Minutes per game
FG%	Field goal percentage	3P%	3-point field goal percentage	FT%	Free throw percentage
RPG	Rebounds per game	APG	Assists per game	SPG	Steals per game
BPG	Blocks per game	PPG	Points per game	**Bold**	Career high

=== NBA ===
==== Regular season ====
Year	Team	GP	FG%	FT%	APG	PPG
1949–50	Minneapolis	1	1.000	–	.0	2.0
