= Detroit Pistons all-time roster =

List of players of the Detroit Pistons NBA franchise

The following is a list of players, both past and current, who appeared at least in one game for the Detroit Pistons NBA franchise.

== Players ==
Note: Statistics are correct through the end of the 2025–26 season.

G	Guard	G/F	Guard-forward	F	Forward	F/C	Forward-center	C	Center

legend
^	Denotes player who has been inducted to the Naismith Memorial Basketball Hall of Fame
*	Denotes player who has been selected for at least one All-Star Game with the Detroit Pistons and is currently on the team roster
^{+}	Denotes player who has been selected for at least one All-Star Game with the Detroit Pistons
^{x}	Denotes player who is currently on the Detroit Pistons roster
0.0	Denotes the Detroit Pistons statistics leader (min. 100 games played for the team for per-game statistics)

=== A to B ===
All-time roster
Player	Pos.	Pre-draft team	Yrs	Seasons	Statistics									Ref.
Player	Pos.	Pre-draft team	Yrs	Seasons	GP	MP	REB	AST	PTS	MPG	RPG	APG	PPG	Ref.
Alex Acker	G	Pepperdine	2	2005–2006; 2008–2009	12	55	7	5	18	4.6	0.6	0.4	1.5	
Don Adams	F	Northwestern	3	1972–1975	195	5,472	1,111	328	1,710	28.1	5.7	1.7	8.8	
Rafael Addison	G/F	Syracuse	1	1994–1995	79	1,776	242	109	656	22.5	3.1	1.4	8.3	
Arron Afflalo	G/F	UCLA	2	2007–2009	149	2,204	271	96	639	14.8	1.8	0.6	4.3	
Mark Aguirre	G/F	DePaul	5	1988–1993	318	7,717	1,218	604	4,115	24.3	3.8	1.9	12.9	
Gary Alcorn	C	Fresno State	1	1959–1960	58	670	279	22	230	11.6	4.8	0.4	4.0	
Victor Alexander	F/C	Iowa State	1	2001–2002	15	97	29	6	40	6.5	1.9	0.4	2.7	
Cadillac Anderson	F/C	Houston	1	1993–1994	77	1,624	571	51	491	21.1	7.4	0.7	6.4	
Joel Anthony	C	UNLV	2	2014–2016	68	502	114	6	105	7.4	1.7	0.1	1.5	
Curly Armstrong	G/F	Indiana	3	1948–1951	153		89	358	1,040		2.3	2.3	6.8	
Jesse Arnelle	F	Penn State	1	1955–1956	31	409	170	18	147	13.2	5.5	0.6	4.7	
Carlos Arroyo	G	FIU	2	2004–2006	90	1,306	128	283	373	14.5	1.4	3.1	4.1	
Dick Atha	G	Indiana State	1	1957–1958	18	160	24	19	44	8.9	1.3	1.1	2.4	
Chucky Atkins	G	South Florida	5	2000–2004; 2009–2010	305	7,441	504	954	2,800	24.4	1.7	3.1	9.2	
Stacey Augmon	G/F	UNLV	1	1996–1997	20	292	49	15	90	14.6	2.5	0.8	4.5	
D. J. Augustin	G	Texas	1	2014–2015	54	1,287	100	265	574	23.8	1.9	4.9	10.6	
Ken Austin	F	Rice	1	1983–1984	7	28	3	1	12	4.0	0.4	0.1	1.7	
Marvin Bagley III	F/C	Duke	3	2021–2024	86	1,958	510	82	1,031	22.8	5.9	1.0	12.0	
Stephen Bardo	G	Illinois	1	1995–1996	9	123	22	15	22	13.7	2.4	1.7	2.4	
Marvin Barnes	F/C	Providence	2	1976–1978	65	1,258	344	64	630	19.4	5.3	1.0	9.7	
John Barnhill	G	Tennessee State	1	1965–1966	45	926	112	113	337	20.6	2.5	2.5	7.5	
Leo Barnhorst	G/F	Notre Dame	1	1953–1954	17	185		12	29	10.9		0.7	1.7	
Dana Barros	G	Boston College	2	2000–2002	89	1,661	151	188	671	18.7	1.7	2.1	7.5	
Jon Barry	G	Georgia Tech	2	2001–2003	162	3,458	414	480	1,294	21.3	2.6	3.0	8.0	
Aron Baynes	C	Washington State	2	2015–2017	156	2,396	717	83	879	15.4	4.6	0.5	5.6	
Malik Beasley	G	Florida State	1	2024–2025	82	2,283	214	139	1,336	27.8	2.6	1.7	16.3	
Corey Beck	G	Arkansas	1	1998–1999	8	30	5	0	10	3.8	0.6	0.0	1.3	
William Bedford	C	Memphis	4	1987–1988; 1989–1992	172	1,469	317	52	605	8.5	1.8	0.3	3.5	
Ron Behagen	F/C	Minnesota	1	1978–1979	1	1	0	0	0	1.0	0.0	0.0	0.0	
Walt Bellamy^	C	Indiana	2	1968–1970	109	3,196	1,113	154	1,554	29.3	10.2	1.4	14.3	
Kent Benson	C	Indiana	7	1979–1986	398	10,003	2,437	734	3,804	25.1	6.1	1.8	9.6	
Saddiq Bey	F	Villanova	3	2020–2023	204	6,113	1,001	412	2,949	30.0	4.9	2.0	14.5	
Don Bielke	C	Valparaiso	1	1955–1956	7	38	9	1	14	5.4	1.3	0.1	2.0	
Chauncey Billups^ (#1)	G	Colorado	8	2002–2009; 2013–2014	482	16,310	1,559	2,984	7,940	33.8	3.2	6.2	16.5	
Dave Bing^ (#21)	G	Syracuse	9	1966–1975	675	26,052	2,828	4,330	15,235	38.6	4.2	6.4	22.6	
Charlie Black	F/C	Kansas	2	1948–1950	53			100	512			1.9	9.7	
Norman Black	G	Saint Joseph's	1	1980–1981	3	28	2	2	8	9.3	0.7	0.7	2.7	
Steve Blake	G	Maryland	1	2015–2016	58	986	89	200	254	17.0	1.5	3.4	4.4	
Will Blalock	G	Iowa State	1	2006–2007	14	166	15	17	25	11.9	1.1	1.2	1.8	
Lance Blanks	G	Texas	2	1990–1992	81	403	42	45	128	5.0	0.5	0.6	1.6	
Buddy Boeheim	G	Syracuse	2	2022–2024	20	174	16	7	50	8.7	0.8	0.4	2.5	
Bojan Bogdanović	F	(Croatia) Cibona	2	2022–2024	87	2,814	317	223	1,838	32.3	3.6	2.6	21.1	
Doug Bolstorff	G	Minnesota	1	1957–1958	3	21	0	0	4	7.0	0.0	0.0	1.3	
Walter Bond	G	Minnesota	1	1994–1995	5	51	5	7	10	10.2	1.0	1.4	2.0	
Jordan Bone	G	Tennessee	1	2019–2020	10	53	4	8	12	5.3	0.4	0.8	1.2	
Jim Bostic	F	New Mexico State	1	1977–1978	4	48	16	3	26	12.0	4.0	0.8	6.5	
Don Boven	G/F	Western Michigan	1	1952–1953	17	377	58	21	104	22.2	3.4	1.2	6.1	
Dennis Boyd	G	Detroit Mercy	1	1978–1979	5	40	2	7	6	8.0	0.4	1.4	1.2	
Avery Bradley	G	Texas	1	2017–2018	40	1,268	94	83	601	31.7	2.4	2.1	15.0	
Jim Brewer	F/C	Minnesota	1	1978–1979	25	310	105	13	57	12.4	4.2	0.5	2.3	
Primož Brezec	C	(Slovenia) Union Olimpija	1	2007–2008	17	98	19	4	27	5.8	1.1	0.2	1.6	
Frank Brian^{+}	G	LSU	5	1951–1956	306	7,616	659	683	3,097	24.9	2.2	2.2	10.1	
Wayman Britt	G	Michigan	1	1977–1978	7	16	4	2	9	2.3	0.6	0.3	1.3	
Bruce Brown	G	Miami (FL)	2	2018–2020	132	3,083	459	321	836	23.4	3.5	2.4	6.3	
Kwame Brown	F	Glynn Academy (GA)	2	2008–2010	106	1,659	467	54	400	15.7	4.4	0.5	3.8	
Marcus Brown	G	Murray State	1	1999–2000	6	45	7	3	10	7.5	1.2	0.5	1.7	
Roger Brown	C	Kansas	2	1975–1977	72	776	220	24	132	10.8	3.1	0.3	1.8	
Troy Brown Jr.	G/F	Oregon	1	2023–2024	22	417	72	25	93	19.0	3.3	1.1	4.2	
Jud Buechler	G/F	Arizona	3	1998–2001	165	2,450	318	129	597	14.8	1.9	0.8	3.6	
Reggie Bullock	G/F	North Carolina	4	2015–2019	174	3,983	409	260	1,495	22.9	2.4	1.5	8.6	
Bill Buntin	F/C	Michigan	1	1965–1966	42	713	252	36	324	17.0	6.0	0.9	7.7	
Alec Burks	G/F	Colorado	2	2022–2024	94	2,023	268	182	1,192	21.5	2.9	1.9	12.7	
Art Burris	F	Tennessee	2	1950–1952	62	245	155	38	120	8.4	2.5	0.6	1.9	
Donnis Butcher	G	Pikeville	3	1963–1966	138	2,995	495	330	967	21.7	3.6	2.4	7.0	
Caron Butler	F	UConn	1	2014–2015	78	1,623	196	79	460	20.8	2.5	1.0	5.9	
Dwight Buycks	G	Marquette	1	2017–2018	29	427	41	59	215	14.7	1.4	2.0	7.4	
Will Bynum	G	Georgia Tech	6	2008–2014	338	6,382	543	1,148	2,845	18.9	1.6	3.4	8.4	

=== C ===
All-time roster
Player	Pos.	Pre-draft team	Yrs	Seasons	Statistics									Ref.
Player	Pos.	Pre-draft team	Yrs	Seasons	GP	MP	REB	AST	PTS	MPG	RPG	APG	PPG	Ref.
Barney Cable	F	Bradley	2	1958–1960	38	387	136	18	157	10.2	3.6	0.5	4.1	
José Calderón	G	(Spain) Tau Cerámica	2	2012–2013; 2018–2019	77	1,519	130	300	439	19.7	1.7	3.9	5.7	
Joe Caldwell	G/F	Arizona State	2	1964–1966	99	2,259	631	183	1,055	22.8	6.4	1.8	10.7	
Kentavious Caldwell-Pope	G	Georgia	4	2013–2017	314	9,488	941	495	3,665	30.2	3.0	1.6	11.7	
Elden Campbell	C	Clemson	2	2003–2005	95	1,232	291	61	479	13.0	3.1	0.6	5.0	
Tony Campbell	G/F	Ohio State	3	1984–1987	178	2,249	383	88	1,102	12.6	2.2	0.5	6.2	
Brian Cardinal	F	Purdue	2	2000–2002	23	169	29	5	48	7.3	1.3	0.2	2.1	
Bob Carpenter	F/C	East Texas State	2	1949–1951	87		62	108	715		3.0	1.2	8.2	
Kenny Carr	F	NC State	1	1981–1982	28	444	137	23	207	15.9	4.9	0.8	7.4	
M. L. Carr	G/F	Guilford	3	1976–1979	241	8,406	1,777	628	3,568	34.9	7.4	2.6	14.8	
George Carter	G/F	St. Bonaventure	1	1967–1968	1	5	0	1	3	5.0	0.0	1.0	3.0	
Cornelius Cash	F	Bowling Green	1	1976–1977	6	49	16	1	21	8.2	2.7	0.2	3.5	
Kelvin Cato	C	Iowa State	1	2005–2006	4	34	7	2	10	8.5	1.8	0.5	2.5	
Malcolm Cazalon	G	(Serbia) Mega Basket	1	2023–2024	1	3	0	0	0	3.0	0.0	0.0	0.0	
Cedric Ceballos	F	Cal State Fullerton	1	2000–2001	13	166	26	7	75	12.8	2.0	0.5	5.8	
Len Chappell	F/C	Wake Forest	1	1967–1968	57	999	346	48	570	17.5	6.1	0.8	10.0	
Pete Chilcutt	F/C	North Carolina	1	1993–1994	30	391	100	15	115	13.0	3.3	0.5	3.8	
Randolph Childress	G	Wake Forest	1	1996–1997	4	30	1	2	10	7.5	0.3	0.5	2.5	
Archie Clark	G	Minnesota	1	1975–1976	79	1,589	137	218	600	20.1	1.7	2.8	7.6	
Mateen Cleaves	G	Michigan State	1	2000–2001	78	1,268	132	207	422	16.3	1.7	2.7	5.4	
Nathaniel Clifton^	F/C	Xavier (LS)	1	1957–1958	68	1,435	403	76	525	21.1	5.9	1.1	7.7	
Bill Closs	F/C	Rice	1	1951–1952	57	1,120	204	76	347	19.6	3.6	1.3	6.1	
Ben Coleman	F	Maryland	1	1993–1994	9	77	26	0	28	8.6	2.9	0.0	3.1	
Derrick Coleman	F	Syracuse	1	2004–2005	5	50	15	0	9	10.0	3.0	0.0	1.8	
Ed Conlin	G/F	Fordham	2	1958–1960	85	1,990	437	143	958	23.4	5.1	1.7	11.3	
Tyler Cook	F	Iowa	1	2020–2021	28	421	93	15	154	15.0	3.3	0.5	5.5	
Chuck Cooper^	F	Duquesne	1	1955–1956	32	570	101	28	124	17.8	3.2	0.9	3.9	
Ray Corley	G	Georgetown	1	1952–1953	8	65	5	5	11	8.1	0.6	0.6	1.4	
Ron Crevier	C	Boston College	1	1985–1986	2	3	1	0	0	1.5	0.5	0.0	0.0	
Dillard Crocker	G/F	Western Michigan	1	1948–1949	2			0	6			0.0	3.0	
John Crotty	G	Virginia	1	1999–2000	69	937	75	128	325	13.6	1.1	1.9	4.7	
Cade Cunningham*	G	Oklahoma State	5	2021–2026	272	9,186	1,476	2,164	6,119	33.8	5.4	8.0	22.5	
Earl Cureton	F/C	Detroit Mercy	3	1983–1986	234	4,566	1,210	256	1,376	19.5	5.2	1.1	5.9	
Bill Curley	F	Boston College	1	1994–1995	53	595	124	25	143	11.2	2.3	0.5	2.7	
Michael Curry	G/F	Georgia Southern	6	1995–1997; 1999–2003	432	8,529	719	519	1,946	19.7	1.7	1.2	4.5	

=== D ===
All-time roster
Player	Pos.	Pre-draft team	Yrs	Seasons	Statistics									Ref.
Player	Pos.	Pre-draft team	Yrs	Seasons	GP	MP	REB	AST	PTS	MPG	RPG	APG	PPG	Ref.
Adrian Dantley^	G/F	Notre Dame	3	1986–1989	192	6,221	723	426	3,894	32.4	3.8	2.2	20.3	
Luigi Datome	F	(Italy) Virtus Roma	2	2013–2015	37	255	50	13	94	6.9	1.4	0.4	2.5	
Kornél Dávid	F	(Hungary) Budapesti Honvéd	1	2000–2001	10	69	19	3	20	6.9	1.9	0.3	2.0	
Dale Davis	F/C	Clemson	2	2005–2007	74	642	190	18	109	8.7	2.6	0.2	1.5	
Hubert Davis	G	North Carolina	2	2002–2004	46	351	36	30	79	7.6	0.8	0.7	1.7	
Jim Davis	F/C	Colorado	4	1971–1975	282	3,480	1,035	270	1,285	12.3	3.7	1.0	4.6	
Darryl Dawkins	C	Maynard Evans HS (FL)	2	1987–1989	16	55	7	2	31	3.4	0.4	0.1	1.9	
Johnny Dawkins	G	Duke	1	1994–1995	50	1,170	113	205	325	23.4	2.3	4.1	6.5	
Austin Daye	F	Gonzaga	4	2009–2013	206	3,312	602	166	1,202	16.1	2.9	0.8	5.8	
Dave DeBusschere^	G/F	Detroit Mercy	7	1962–1969	440	15,235	4,947	1,152	7,096	34.6	11.2	2.6	16.1	
Archie Dees	F/C	Indiana	2	1959–1961	101	1,552	491	60	852	15.4	4.9	0.6	8.4	
Bison Dele	F/C	Arizona	2	1997–1999	127	3,796	967	165	1,774	29.9	7.6	1.3	14.0	
Carlos Delfino	G	(Italy) Fortitudo Bologna	3	2004–2007	180	2,557	434	170	791	14.2	2.4	0.9	4.4	
Tony Delk	G	Kentucky	1	2005–2006	23	378	51	33	180	16.4	2.2	1.4	7.8	
Fennis Dembo	F	Wyoming	1	1988–1989	31	74	23	5	36	2.4	0.7	0.2	1.2	
Walter Devlin	G	George Washington	2	1955–1957	140	2,777	317	279	1,023	19.8	2.3	2.0	7.3	
Cheick Diallo	F/C	Kansas	1	2021–2022	3	31	12	0	11	10.3	4.0	0.0	3.7	
Hamidou Diallo	G	Kentucky	3	2020–2023	134	2,370	578	152	1,381	20.4	4.3	1.1	10.3	
Henry Dickerson	G	Charleston	1	1975–1976	17	112	3	8	28	6.6	0.2	0.5	1.6	
Spencer Dinwiddie	G	Colorado	2	2014–2016	46	614	65	126	203	13.3	1.4	2.7	4.4	
Terry Dischinger^{+}	G/F	Purdue	6	1964–1965; 1967–1972	452	11,761	2,331	716	5,512	26.0	5.2	1.6	12.2	
Juan Dixon	G	Maryland	1	2007–2008	17	244	28	32	110	14.4	1.6	1.9	6.5	
Leon Douglas	F/C	Alabama	4	1976–1980	309	7,616	2,273	375	2,939	24.6	7.4	1.2	9.5	
Sekou Doumbouya	F	(France) Limoges CSP	2	2019–2021	94	1,623	261	66	528	17.3	2.8	0.7	5.6	
Sonny Dove	F	St. John's	2	1967–1969	57	398	114	23	174	7.0	2.0	0.4	3.1	
Danny Doyle	F	Belmont Abbey	1	1962–1963	4	25	8	3	16	6.3	2.0	0.8	4.0	
Larry Drew	G	Missouri	1	1980–1981	76	1,581	120	249	504	20.8	1.6	3.3	6.6	
Terry Driscoll	F	Boston College	1	1970–1971	69	1,255	402	54	372	18.2	5.8	0.8	5.4	
Andre Drummond^{+}	C	UConn	8	2012–2020	591	18,365	8,199	764	8,531	31.1	13.9	1.3	14.4	
Terry Duerod	G	Detroit Mercy	1	1979–1980	67	1,331	98	117	624	19.9	1.5	1.7	9.3	
Bob Duffy	G	Colgate	2	1963–1965	46	632	58	79	228	13.7	1.3	1.7	5.0	
Walter Dukes^{+}	C	Seton Hall	6	1957–1963	422	11,515	4,986	515	4,580	27.3	11.8	1.2	10.9	
Joe Dumars^ (#4)	G	McNeese State	14	1985–1999	1,018	35,139	2,203	4,612	16,401	34.5	2.2	4.5	16.1	
Ronald Dupree	F	LSU	3	2004–2005; 2006–2008	67	569	112	29	177	8.5	1.7	0.4	2.6	
Jalen Duren*	C	Memphis	4	2022–2026	276	7,457	2,848	569	3,736	27.0	10.3	2.1	13.5	

=== E to F ===
All-time roster
Player	Pos.	Pre-draft team	Yrs	Seasons	Statistics									Ref.
Player	Pos.	Pre-draft team	Yrs	Seasons	GP	MP	REB	AST	PTS	MPG	RPG	APG	PPG	Ref.
Bill Ebben	G	Detroit Mercy	1	1957–1958	8	50	8	4	15	6.3	1.0	0.5	1.9	
Al Eberhard	F	Missouri	4	1974–1978	220	4,138	760	175	1,490	18.8	3.5	0.8	6.8	
Dwight Eddleman	G/F	Illinois	2	1951–1953	85	1,859	273	127	719	21.9	3.2	1.5	8.5	
Carsen Edwards	G	Purdue	1	2021–2022	4	79	6	14	23	19.8	1.5	3.5	5.8	
James Edwards	F/C	Washington	4	1987–1991	256	5,768	930	182	2,867	22.5	3.6	0.7	11.2	
Johnny Egan	G	Providence	3	1961–1964	128	2,286	207	332	860	17.9	1.6	2.6	6.7	
Henry Ellenson	F	Marquette	3	2016–2019	59	500	131	28	223	8.5	2.2	0.5	3.8	
Wayne Ellington	G	North Carolina	2	2018–2019; 2020–2021	74	1,776	145	110	778	24.0	2.0	1.5	10.5	
Sean Elliott	F	Arizona	1	1993–1994	73	2,409	263	197	885	33.0	3.6	2.7	12.1	
Kim English	G	Missouri	1	2012–2013	41	407	37	26	119	9.9	0.9	0.6	2.9	
James Ennis III	F	Long Beach State	1	2017–2018	27	551	67	22	202	20.4	2.5	0.8	7.5	
Earl Evans	F	UNLV	1	1979–1980	36	381	75	37	157	10.6	2.1	1.0	4.4	
Maurice Evans	G	Texas	1	2005–2006	80	1,139	163	60	403	14.2	2.0	0.8	5.0	
Tosan Evbuomwan	F	Princeton	1	2023–2024	13	293	46	10	91	22.5	3.5	0.8	7.0	
Dick Farley	G/F	Indiana	1	1958–1959	70	1,280	195	124	491	18.3	2.8	1.8	7.0	
Kay Felder	G	Oakland	1	2017–2018	2	6	4	0	2	3.0	2.0	0.0	1.0	
Jake Fendley	G	Northwestern	2	1951–1953	103	1,031	126	94	287	10.0	1.2	0.9	2.8	
Bob Ferry	F/C	Saint Louis	4	1960–1964	312	7,576	1,968	538	3,851	24.3	6.3	1.7	12.3	
Malachi Flynn	G	San Diego State	1	2023–2024	24	342	43	51	192	14.3	1.8	2.1	8.0	
Simone Fontecchio	F	(Italy) Vanoli Cremona	2	2023–2025	91	1,721	285	93	693	18.9	3.1	1.0	7.6	
Chris Ford	G/F	Villanova	7	1972–1979	485	12,985	1,686	1,698	4,120	26.8	3.5	3.5	8.5	
Fred Foster	F	Miami (OH)	1	1972–1973	63	1,460	183	94	547	23.2	2.9	1.5	8.7	
Evan Fournier	G/F	(France) Poitiers	1	2023–2024	29	541	54	45	208	18.7	1.9	1.6	7.2	
Larry Foust^{+}	F/C	La Salle	7	1950–1957	476	13,432	5,200	918	7,124	32.9	10.9	1.9	15.0	
Tremaine Fowlkes	F	Fresno State	1	2003–2004	36	261	53	14	44	7.3	1.5	0.4	1.2	
Jim Fox	F/C	South Carolina	2	1967–1969	49	755	274	40	222	15.4	5.6	0.8	4.5	
Tim Frazier	G	Penn State	1	2019–2020	27	355	33	93	97	13.1	1.2	3.4	3.6	
Jim Fritsche	F/C	Hamline	1	1954–1955	16	151	32	4	45	9.4	2.0	0.3	2.8	
Tony Fuller	G	Pepperdine	1	1980–1981	15	248	42	28	60	16.5	2.8	1.9	4.0	

=== G to H ===
All-time roster
Player	Pos.	Pre-draft team	Yrs	Seasons	Statistics									Ref.
Player	Pos.	Pre-draft team	Yrs	Seasons	GP	MP	REB	AST	PTS	MPG	RPG	APG	PPG	Ref.
Harry Gallatin^	F/C	Truman	1	1957–1958	72	1,990	749	86	1,072	27.6	10.4	1.2	14.9	
Danilo Gallinari	F	(Italy) Olimpia Milano	1	2023–2024	6	90	14	12	52	15.0	2.3	2.0	8.7	
Langston Galloway	G	Saint Joseph's	3	2017–2020	204	4,310	412	244	1,709	21.1	2.0	1.2	8.4	
Dave Gambee	F	Oregon State	1	1968–1969	25	302	78	15	169	12.1	3.1	0.6	6.8	
Luka Garza	F/C	Iowa	1	2021–2022	32	389	100	20	186	12.2	3.1	0.6	5.8	
Michael Gbinije	G	Syracuse	1	2016–2017	9	32	3	2	4	3.6	0.3	0.2	0.4	
Gus Gerard	G/F	Virginia	2	1977–1979	49	811	147	44	375	16.6	3.0	0.9	7.7	
Mike Gibson	F	USC Upstate	1	1985–1986	32	161	40	5	48	5.0	1.3	0.2	1.5	
Taj Gibson	F/C	USC	1	2023–2024	4	39	9	2	18	9.8	2.3	0.5	4.5	
Gerald Glass	G/F	Ole Miss	1	1992–1993	56	777	139	68	296	13.9	2.5	1.2	5.3	
Anthony Goldwire	G	Houston	1	2004–2005	9	55	8	0	18	6.1	0.9	0.0	2.0	
Ben Gordon	G	UConn	3	2009–2012	196	5,259	435	464	2,424	26.8	2.2	2.4	12.4	
Jerami Grant	F	Syracuse	2	2020–2022	101	3,329	441	263	2,109	33.0	4.4	2.6	20.9	
Javonte Green^{x}	G	Radford	1	2025–2026	82	1,446	230	56	569	17.6	2.8	0.7	6.9	
Litterial Green	G	Georgia	1	1996–1997	45	311	22	41	90	6.9	0.5	0.9	2.0	
Rickey Green	G	Michigan	1	1978–1979	27	431	40	63	179	16.0	1.5	2.3	6.6	
Sidney Green	F/C	UNLV	1	1986–1987	80	1,792	653	62	631	22.4	8.2	0.8	7.9	
David Greenwood	F/C	UCLA	1	1989–1990	37	205	78	12	60	5.5	2.1	0.3	1.6	
Blake Griffin^{+}	F	Oklahoma	4	2017–2021	138	4,591	919	693	2,861	33.3	6.7	5.0	20.7	
Quentin Grimes	G	Houston	1	2023–2024	6	115	12	14	32	19.2	2.0	2.3	5.3	
Dick Groat	G	Duke	1	1952–1953	26	663	86	69	309	25.5	3.3	2.7	11.9	
Glenn Hagan	G	St. Bonaventure	1	1981–1982	4	25	4	8	7	6.3	1.0	2.0	1.8	
Happy Hairston	F	NYU	3	1967–1970	122	4,063	1,309	157	2,113	33.3	10.7	1.3	17.3	
Lindsay Hairston	F/C	Michigan State	1	1975–1976	47	651	179	21	273	13.9	3.8	0.4	5.8	
Bruce Hale	G/F	Santa Clara	1	1948–1949	34			87	320			2.6	9.4	
Donta Hall	C	Alabama	1	2019–2020	4	48	15	2	6	12.0	3.8	0.5	1.5	
Darvin Ham	F	Texas Tech	2	2003–2005	101	759	128	21	142	7.5	1.3	0.2	1.4	
Ralph Hamilton	G/F	Indiana	1	1948–1949	10			3	42			0.3	4.2	
Richard Hamilton^{+} (#32)	G/F	UConn	9	2002–2011	631	21,679	2,120	2,419	11,582	34.4	3.4	3.8	18.4	
Roy Hamilton	G	UCLA	1	1979–1980	72	1,116	107	192	333	15.5	1.5	2.7	4.6	
R. J. Hampton	G	Little Elm HS (TX)	1	2022–2023	21	389	48	20	153	18.5	2.3	1.0	7.3	
Alex Hannum^	F/C	USC	1	1956–1957										
Tim Hardaway Jr.	G	Michigan	1	2024–2025	77	2,153	183	123	844	28.0	2.4	1.6	11.0	
Reggie Harding	C	Martin Luther King HS (MI)	3	1963–1965; 1966–1967	191	5,224	1,771	325	1,774	27.4	9.3	1.7	9.3	
Alan Hardy	F	Michigan	1	1981–1982	38	310	34	20	142	8.2	0.9	0.5	3.7	
John Hargis	G/F	Texas	1	1950–1951	14		30	9	67		2.1	0.6	4.8	
Justin Harper	F	Richmond	1	2015–2016	5	35	1	0	13	7.0	0.2	0.0	2.6	
Ron Harper Jr.	F	Rutgers	1	2024–2025	1	17	7	2	4	17.0	7.0	2.0	4.0	
Josh Harrellson	C	Kentucky	1	2013–2014	32	317	76	15	93	9.9	2.4	0.5	2.9	
Bob Harris	F/C	Oklahoma State	2	1949–1951	74		44	137	517		3.7	1.9	7.0	
Joe Harris	G/F	Virginia	1	2023–2024	16	170	13	10	39	10.6	0.8	0.6	2.4	
Steve Harris	G	Tulsa	1	1988–1989	3	7	2	0	4	2.3	0.7	0.0	1.3	
Tobias Harris^{x}	F	Tennessee	5	2015–2018; 2024–2026	293	9,085	1,583	625	4,474	31.0	5.4	2.1	15.3	
Scott Hastings	F/C	Arkansas	2	1989–1991	67	279	60	15	90	4.2	0.9	0.2	1.3	
Robert Hawkins	G	Illinois State	1	1978–1979	4	28	6	4	18	7.0	1.5	1.0	4.5	
Jarvis Hayes	F	Georgia	1	2007–2008	82	1,287	178	62	552	15.7	2.2	0.8	6.7	
Killian Hayes	G	(Germany) Ratiopharm Ulm	4	2020–2024	210	5,479	619	1,090	1,704	26.1	2.9	5.2	8.1	
Steve Hayes	C	Idaho State	1	1981–1982	26	412	100	24	117	15.8	3.8	0.9	4.5	
Reggie Hearn	G	Northwestern	1	2017–2018	3	7	0	0	3	2.3	0.0	0.0	1.0	
Gerald Henderson	G	VCU	3	1989–1992	77	789	74	128	255	10.2	1.0	1.7	3.3	
Bill Henry	C	Rice	2	1948–1950	76			94	531			1.2	7.0	
John Henson	F/C	North Carolina	1	2019–2020	11	188	48	11	76	17.1	4.4	1.0	6.9	
Steve Henson	G	Kansas State	2	1997–1999	27	90	2	7	40	3.3	0.1	0.3	1.5	
Walter Herrmann	F	(Argentina) Atenas de Córdoba	2	2007–2009	87	829	144	36	309	9.5	1.7	0.4	3.6	
Keith Herron	G/F	Villanova	1	1980–1981	80	2,270	211	148	1,094	28.4	2.6	1.9	13.7	
Bill Hewitt	F	USC	3	1969–1972	175	3,729	1,037	231	986	21.3	5.9	1.3	5.6	
Wayne Hightower	F/C	Kansas	1	1966–1967	29	564	164	28	248	19.4	5.7	1.0	8.6	
Grant Hill^	G/F	Duke	6	1994–2000	435	17,007	3,417	2,720	9,393	39.1	7.9	6.3	21.6	
Darrun Hilliard	G	Villanova	2	2015–2017	77	764	78	60	279	9.9	1.0	0.8	3.6	
Bob Hogsett	F	Tennessee	1	1966–1967	7	22	3	1	16	3.1	0.4	0.1	2.3	
Ron Holland^{x}	F	NBA G League Ignite	2	2024–2026	159	2,817	533	177	1,162	17.7	3.4	1.1	7.3	
Lionel Hollins	G	Arizona State	1	1983–1984	32	216	22	62	59	6.8	0.7	1.9	1.8	
Essie Hollis	F	St. Bonaventure	1	1978–1979	25	154	45	6	69	6.2	1.8	0.2	2.8	
Jim Holstein	G/F	Cincinnati	1	1955–1956										
Joe Holup	F	George Washington	2	1957–1959	105	2,109	550	96	779	20.1	5.2	0.9	7.4	
Johnny Horan	F	Dayton	1	1955–1956	7	43	4	1	22	6.1	0.6	0.1	3.1	
Bob Houbregs^	F/C	Washington	4	1954–1958	147	3,429	880	291	1,578	23.3	6.0	2.0	10.7	
Allan Houston	G	Tennessee	3	1993–1996	237	6,587	587	514	3,386	27.8	2.5	2.2	14.3	
Otis Howard	F	Austin Peay	1	1978–1979	11	91	34	4	49	8.3	3.1	0.4	4.5	
Bailey Howell^	F	Mississippi State	5	1959–1964	387	13,826	4,583	882	8,182	35.7	11.8	2.3	21.1	
Phil Hubbard	F/C	Michigan	3	1979–1982	196	4,582	1,178	287	2,266	23.4	6.0	1.5	11.6	
Kevin Huerter^{x}	G/F	Maryland	1	2025–2026	25	512	71	62	214	20.5	2.8	2.5	8.6	
Lindsey Hunter	G	Jackson State	12	1993–2000; 2003–2008	703	18,574	1,646	2,038	6,292	26.4	2.3	2.9	9.0	
Mel Hutchins^{+}	F/C	BYU	4	1953–1957	282	10,681	2,427	847	3,287	37.9	8.6	3.0	11.7	

=== I to J ===
All-time roster
Player	Pos.	Pre-draft team	Yrs	Seasons	Statistics									Ref.
Player	Pos.	Pre-draft team	Yrs	Seasons	GP	MP	REB	AST	PTS	MPG	RPG	APG	PPG	Ref.
Ersan İlyasova	F	(Turkey) Ülkerspor	1	2015–2016	52	1,434	282	55	589	27.6	5.4	1.1	11.3	
Darrall Imhoff	C	California	2	1962–1964	103	1,329	438	84	397	12.9	4.3	0.8	3.9	
Allen Iverson^	G	Georgetown	1	2008–2009	54	1,970	165	263	939	36.5	3.1	4.9	17.4	
Jaden Ivey	G	Purdue	4	2022–2026	214	5,974	748	854	3,187	27.9	3.5	4.0	14.9	
Frank Jackson	G	Duke	2	2020–2022	93	1,902	173	91	950	20.5	1.9	1.0	10.2	
Jermaine Jackson	G	Detroit Mercy	1	1999–2000	7	73	11	4	7	10.4	1.6	0.6	1.0	
Josh Jackson	G/F	Kansas	2	2020–2022	101	2,267	377	192	1,104	22.4	3.7	1.9	10.9	
Reggie Jackson	G	Boston College	6	2014–2020	299	8,589	875	1,664	4,842	28.7	2.9	5.6	16.2	
Mike James	G	Duquesne	1	2003–2004	26	512	58	95	165	19.7	2.2	3.7	6.3	
Daniss Jenkins^{x}	G	St. John's	2	2024–2026	79	1,478	168	281	678	18.7	2.1	3.6	8.6	
Horace Jenkins	G	William Paterson	1	2004–2005	15	104	9	9	42	6.9	0.6	0.6	2.8	
Brandon Jennings	G	Oak Hill Academy (VA)	3	2013–2016	144	4,317	394	951	2,030	30.0	2.7	6.6	14.1	
Jonas Jerebko	F	(Italy) Angelico Biella	5	2009–2010; 2011–2015	303	6,036	1,288	224	2,185	19.9	4.3	0.7	7.2	
Amir Johnson	F/C	Westchester HS (CA)	4	2005–2009	135	1,838	508	55	505	13.6	3.8	0.4	3.7	
Boag Johnson	G	Huntington	4	1949–1953	169	2,295	498	465	1,368	33.3	3.6	2.8	8.1	
Lee Johnson	F	East Texas State	1	1980–1981	2	10	2	0	0	5.0	1.0	0.0	0.0	
Ron Johnson	F	Minnesota	1	1960–1961	6	60	14	1	31	10.0	2.3	0.2	5.2	
Stanley Johnson	F	Arizona	4	2015–2019	267	5,913	922	395	1,889	22.1	3.5	1.5	7.1	
Vinnie Johnson (#15)	G	Baylor	10	1981–1991	798	20,218	2,491	2,661	10,146	25.3	3.1	3.3	12.7	
Jim Johnstone	F/C	Wake Forest	1	1982–1983	16	137	30	10	24	8.6	1.9	0.6	1.5	
Charles Jones	F/C	Albany State	1	1993–1994	42	877	235	29	91	20.9	5.6	0.7	2.2	
Colby Jones	G	Xavier	1	2025–2026	1	7	4	2	2	7.0	4.0	2.0	2.0	
Damon Jones	G	Houston	1	2001–2002	67	1,083	103	140	340	16.2	1.5	2.1	5.1	
Edgar Jones	F/C	Nevada	2	1981–1983	97	1,838	478	109	784	18.9	4.9	1.1	8.1	
Isaac Jones^{x}	F	Washington State	1	2025–2026	4	19	3	0	6	4.8	0.8	0.0	1.5	
Major Jones	F	Albany State	1	1984–1985	47	418	128	15	129	8.9	2.7	0.3	2.7	
Wali Jones	G	Villanova	1	1975–1976	1	19	0	2	8	19.0	0.0	2.0	8.0	
Willie Jones	G	Northwestern	5	1960–1965	272	4,568	767	545	2,016	16.8	2.8	2.0	7.4	
Phil Jordon	F/C	Whitworth	2	1957–1959	118	2,881	871	115	1,442	24.4	7.4	1.0	12.2	
Cory Joseph	G	Texas	3	2020–2023	146	3,329	340	559	1,176	22.8	2.3	3.8	8.1	
Jeff Judkins	G/F	Utah	1	1981–1982	30	251	34	14	79	8.4	1.1	0.5	2.6	

=== K to L ===
All-time roster
Player	Pos.	Pre-draft team	Yrs	Seasons	Statistics									Ref.
Player	Pos.	Pre-draft team	Yrs	Seasons	GP	MP	REB	AST	PTS	MPG	RPG	APG	PPG	Ref.
Greg Kelser	F	Michigan State	3	1979–1982	86	2,070	435	165	1,114	24.1	5.1	1.9	13.0	
Ben Kelso	G	Central Michigan	1	1973–1974	46	298	31	18	85	6.5	0.7	0.4	1.8	
Luke Kennard	G	Duke	3	2017–2020	164	3,822	457	353	1,613	23.3	2.8	2.2	9.8	
Bill Kenville	G/F	St. Bonaventure	3	1956–1958; 1959–1960	131	2,715	497	284	967	20.7	3.8	2.2	7.4	
Jack Kerris	F/C	Loyola (IL)	4	1949–1953	250	3,130	1,198	611	1,936	26.5	6.4	2.4	7.7	
Braxton Key	F	Virginia	2	2021–2023	12	200	49	10	81	16.7	4.1	0.8	6.8	
Jack Kiley	G	Syracuse	2	1951–1953	53	504	51	65	124	9.5	1.0	1.2	2.3	
Stan Kimbrough	G	Xavier	1	1989–1990	10	50	7	5	16	5.0	0.7	0.5	1.6	
Louis King	F	Oregon	1	2019–2020	10	62	10	5	20	6.2	1.0	0.5	2.0	
Bob Kinney	F/C	Rice	1	1948–1949	37			51	254			1.4	6.9	
Walt Kirk	G/F	Illinois	1	1948–1949	14			12	69			0.9	4.9	
Leo Klier	G/F	Notre Dame	2	1948–1950	113			177	802			1.6	7.1	
Bobi Klintman	F	Wake Forest	2	2024–2026	20	113	26	13	37	5.7	1.3	0.7	1.9	
Duane Klueh	G	Indiana State	2	1949–1951	80		183	110	593		3.0	1.4	7.4	
Brandon Knight	G	Kentucky	3	2011–2013; 2019–2020	150	4,715	479	592	1,950	31.4	3.2	3.9	13.0	
Negele Knight	G	Dayton	1	1994–1995	44	665	58	116	181	15.1	1.3	2.6	4.1	
Kevin Knox II	F	Kentucky	2	2022–2024	73	1,153	183	38	460	15.8	2.5	0.5	6.3	
Don Kojis	F	Marquette	2	1964–1966	125	1,619	503	105	862	13.0	4.0	0.8	6.9	
Howard Komives	G	Bowling Green	4	1968–1972	296	8,147	721	1,131	2,957	27.5	2.4	3.8	10.0	
Viacheslav Kravtsov	C	(Ukraine) Kyiv	1	2012–2013	25	224	45	9	77	9.0	1.8	0.4	3.1	
Christian Laettner	F/C	Duke	2	1998–2000	98	2,780	607	210	1,123	28.4	6.2	2.1	11.5	
Bill Laimbeer^{+} (#40)	C	Notre Dame	13	1981–1994	937	30,602	9,430	1,923	12,665	32.7	10.1	2.1	13.5	
Bob Lanier^ (#16)	C	St. Bonaventure	10	1970–1980	681	24,640	8,063	2,256	15,488	36.2	11.8	3.3	22.7	
Chaz Lanier^{x}	G	Tennessee	1	2025–2026	34	262	23	17	80	7.7	0.7	0.5	2.4	
Stu Lantz	G	Nebraska	2	1972–1974	101	2,583	285	235	937	25.6	2.8	2.3	9.3	
Edmund Lawrence	C	McNeese State	1	1980–1981	3	19	4	1	12	6.3	1.3	0.3	4.0	
Eric Leckner	F/C	Wyoming	2	1994–1996	75	778	208	15	269	10.4	2.8	0.2	3.6	
George Lee	G/F	Michigan	2	1960–1962	149	3,086	839	153	1,467	20.7	5.6	1.0	9.8	
Ron Lee	G	Oregon	3	1979–1982	194	4,099	465	848	844	21.1	2.4	4.4	4.4	
Saben Lee	G	Vanderbilt	2	2020–2022	85	1,385	184	281	475	16.3	2.2	3.3	5.6	
Jon Leuer	F	Wisconsin	3	2016–2019	124	2,482	531	130	966	20.0	4.3	1.0	7.8	
Caris LeVert^{x}	G/F	Michigan	1	2025–2026	60	1,154	117	159	443	19.2	2.0	2.7	7.4	
Cliff Levingston	F	Wichita State	2	1982–1984	142	2,625	777	161	929	18.5	5.5	1.1	6.5	
Ralph Lewis	G/F	La Salle	2	1987–1988; 1989–1990	54	316	51	14	83	5.9	0.9	0.3	1.5	
Marcus Liberty	F	Illinois	1	1993–1994	35	274	56	15	100	7.8	1.6	0.4	2.9	
Bill Ligon	G	Vanderbilt	1	1974–1975	38	272	26	25	126	7.2	0.7	0.7	3.3	
Isaiah Livers	F	Michigan	3	2021–2024	94	2,051	248	87	581	21.8	2.6	0.9	6.2	
Earl Lloyd^	F/C	West Virginia State	2	1958–1960	140	3,406	822	179	1,207	24.3	5.9	1.3	8.6	
Zach Lofton	G	New Mexico State	1	2018–2019	1	4	0	0	0	4.0	0.0	0.0	0.0	
Grant Long	F	Eastern Michigan	2	1996–1998	105	1,905	372	64	467	18.1	3.5	0.6	4.4	
John Long	G/F	Detroit Mercy	10	1978–1986; 1989–1991	608	16,226	1,857	1,136	9,023	26.7	3.1	1.9	14.8	
Paul Long	G	Wake Forest	2	1967–1968; 1969–1970	41	223	26	29	140	5.4	0.6	0.7	3.4	
Kevin Loughery	G	St. John's	2	1962–1964	58	847	109	104	365	14.6	1.9	1.8	6.3	
Sidney Lowe	G	NC State	1	1984–1985	6	31	1	8	4	5.2	0.2	1.3	0.7	
John Lucas III	G	Oklahoma State	1	2014–2015	21	272	16	60	98	13.0	0.8	2.9	4.7	
Kalin Lucas	G	Michigan State	1	2018–2019	1	6	3	1	2	6.0	3.0	1.0	2.0	
Trey Lyles	F/C	Kentucky	1	2021–2022	51	990	244	58	532	19.4	4.8	1.1	10.4	

=== M ===
All-time roster
Player	Pos.	Pre-draft team	Yrs	Seasons	Statistics									Ref.
Player	Pos.	Pre-draft team	Yrs	Seasons	GP	MP	REB	AST	PTS	MPG	RPG	APG	PPG	Ref.
Vernon Macklin	F	Florida	1	2011–2012	23	135	34	5	46	5.9	1.5	0.2	2.0	
Mark Macon	G	Temple	4	1993–1996; 1998–1999	120	1,447	137	123	486	12.1	1.1	1.0	4.1	
Corey Maggette	F	Duke	1	2012–2013	18	257	25	19	95	14.3	1.4	1.1	5.3	
John Mahnken	C	Georgetown	2	1948–1950	39			84	358			2.2	9.2	
Rick Mahorn	F/C	Hampton	6	1985–1989; 1996–1998	363	7,403	2,096	242	2,215	20.4	5.8	0.7	6.1	
Thon Maker	F/C	Orangeville Prep (CAN)	2	2018–2020	89	1,339	273	70	440	15.0	3.1	0.8	4.9	
Steve Malovic	F	San Diego State	1	1979–1980	10	162	28	14	26	16.2	2.8	1.4	2.6	
Danny Manning	F/C	Kansas	1	2002–2003	13	89	18	7	34	6.8	1.4	0.5	2.6	
Pace Mannion	G	Utah	1	1988–1989	5	14	3	0	4	2.8	0.6	0.0	0.8	
Boban Marjanović	C	(Serbia) Hemofarm	2	2016–2018	54	464	187	23	309	8.6	3.5	0.4	5.7	
Harvey Marlatt	G	Eastern Michigan	3	1970–1973	61	746	86	94	225	12.2	1.4	1.5	3.7	
Tom Marshall	G/F	Western Kentucky	1	1957–1958	9	66	8	4	21	7.3	0.9	0.4	2.3	
Cartier Martin	F	Kansas State	1	2014–2015	23	198	20	11	36	8.6	0.9	0.5	1.6	
Jason Maxiell	F	Cincinnati	8	2005–2013	523	10,013	2,287	238	3,169	19.1	4.4	0.5	6.1	
Scott May	F	Indiana	1	1982–1983	9	155	26	12	59	17.2	2.9	1.3	6.6	
Bob McAdoo^	F/C	North Carolina	2	1979–1981	64	2,265	508	220	1,294	35.4	7.9	3.4	20.2	
Bob McCann	F	Morehead State	1	1991–1992	26	129	30	6	30	5.0	1.2	0.2	1.2	
Antonio McDyess	F/C	Alabama	5	2004–2009	381	9,410	2,687	405	3,321	24.7	7.1	1.1	8.7	
Jim McElroy	G	Central Michigan	1	1979–1980	36	1,012	50	162	422	28.1	1.4	4.5	11.7	
Tracy McGrady^	G/F	Mount Zion Christian Academy (NC)	1	2010–2011	72	1,686	251	252	574	23.4	3.5	3.5	8.0	
Rodney McGruder	G	Kansas State	3	2020–2023	99	1,472	207	92	547	14.9	2.1	0.9	5.5	
Dick McGuire^	G	St. John's	3	1957–1960	208	5,840	840	1,255	1,693	28.1	4.0	6.0	8.1	
Aaron McKie	G	Temple	2	1996–1998	66	1,322	196	115	372	20.0	3.0	1.7	5.6	
McCoy McLemore	F/C	Drake	2	1968–1970	123	2,331	572	127	951	19.0	4.7	1.0	7.7	
Shellie McMillon	F	Bradley	4	1958–1962	215	3,942	1,267	179	1,831	18.3	5.9	0.8	8.5	
Larry McNeill	F/C	Marquette	1	1978–1979	11	46	10	3	29	4.2	0.9	0.3	2.6	
Cozell McQueen	F	NC State	1	1986–1987	3	7	8	0	6	2.3	2.7	0.0	2.0	
Jordan McRae	G/F	Tennessee	1	2019–2020	4	98	15	7	47	24.5	3.8	1.8	11.8	
Jodie Meeks	G	Kentucky	2	2014–2016	63	1,505	109	82	685	23.9	1.7	1.3	10.9	
Dick Mehen	F/C	Tennessee	1	1950–1951	43		121	52	279		2.8	1.2	6.5	
Don Meineke	F/C	Dayton	3	1952–1955	207	4,742	1,084	293	1,522	22.9	5.2	1.4	7.4	
John Mengelt	G	Auburn	4	1972–1976	291	6,090	671	585	2,987	20.9	2.3	2.0	10.3	
Chimezie Metu	G	USC	1	2023–2024	14	411	84	27	147	29.4	6.0	1.9	10.5	
Khris Middleton	G/F	Texas A&M	1	2012–2013	27	475	50	28	165	17.6	1.9	1.0	6.1	
Eddie Miles^{+}	G/F	Seattle	7	1963–1970	497	13,890	1,673	1,094	7,419	27.9	3.4	2.2	14.9	
Darko Miličić	F/C	(Serbia) Hemofarm	3	2003–2006	96	553	114	23	152	5.8	1.2	0.2	1.6	
Oliver Miller	C	Arkansas	1	1994–1995	64	1,558	475	93	545	24.3	7.4	1.5	8.5	
Quincy Miller	F	Baylor	1	2014–2015	4	58	8	5	12	14.5	2.0	1.3	3.0	
Terry Mills	F	Michigan	6	1992–1997; 1999–2000	476	12,965	2,821	730	5,872	27.2	5.9	1.5	12.3	
Shake Milton	G	SMU	1	2023–2024	4	63	18	6	27	15.8	4.5	1.5	6.8	
Tony Mitchell	F	North Texas	1	2013–2014	21	79	26	2	22	3.8	1.2	0.1	1.0	
Steve Mix	F	Toledo	3	1969–1972	61	1,111	251	53	446	18.2	4.1	0.9	7.3	
Leo Mogus	F/C	Youngstown State	1	1948–1949	20			27	173			1.4	8.7	
Nazr Mohammed	C	Kentucky	2	2006–2008	72	1,001	302	15	355	13.9	4.2	0.2	4.9	
Paul Mokeski	F/C	Kansas	2	1980–1982	119	2,338	540	159	691	19.6	4.5	1.3	5.8	
Jack Molinas^{+}	F	Columbia	1	1953–1954	32	958	228	51	370	29.9	7.1	1.6	11.6	
Eric Money	G	Arizona	5	1974–1978; 1979–1980	350	8,766	725	1,276	4,123	25.0	2.1	3.6	11.8	
Greg Monroe	F/C	Georgetown	5	2010–2015	378	11,818	3,479	851	5,411	31.3	9.2	2.3	14.3	
Luis Montero	G	Westchester CC	1	2017–2018	2	8	2	0	0	4.0	1.0	0.0	0.0	
Eric Montross	C	North Carolina	4	1997–2001	167	1,831	462	40	313	11.0	2.8	0.2	1.9	
Mikki Moore	F/C	Nebraska	4	1998–2002	142	1,865	482	61	670	13.1	3.4	0.4	4.7	
Otto Moore	F/C	UTPA	4	1968–1971; 1974–1975	239	6,065	2,126	261	2,274	25.4	8.9	1.1	9.5	
Ron Moore	C	West Virginia State	1	1987–1988	9	25	2	1	10	2.8	0.2	0.1	1.1	
Tracy Moore	G/F	Tulsa	1	1993–1994	3	10	1	0	6	3.3	0.3	0.0	2.0	
Wendell Moore Jr.^{x}	G	Duke	2	2024–2026	26	279	50	27	73	10.7	1.9	1.0	2.8	
Eric Moreland	F/C	Oregon State	1	2017–2018	67	805	278	78	143	12.0	4.1	1.2	2.1	
Jackie Moreland	G/F	Louisiana Tech	5	1960–1965	348	6,250	1,779	432	2,684	18.0	5.1	1.2	7.7	
Isaiah Morris	F	Arkansas	1	1992–1993	25	102	12	4	55	4.1	0.5	0.2	2.2	
Marcus Morris	F	Kansas	2	2015–2017	159	5,421	770	361	2,236	34.1	4.8	2.3	14.1	
Markieff Morris	F	Kansas	1	2019–2020	44	988	173	69	486	22.5	3.9	1.6	11.0	
Monté Morris	G	Iowa State	1	2023–2024	6	68	12	8	27	11.3	2.0	1.3	4.5	
Erwin Mueller	F/C	San Francisco	4	1969–1973	189	4,193	853	376	1,273	22.2	4.5	2.0	6.7	
Tod Murphy	F/C	UC Irvine	1	1993–1994	7	57	9	3	15	8.1	1.3	0.4	2.1	
Ken Murray	G/F	St. Bonaventure	2	1950–1951; 1953–1954	63	528	65	109	287	10.8	1.3	1.7	4.6	
Ronald Murray	G	Shaw	2	2006–2008	88	1,824	149	251	607	20.7	1.7	2.9	6.9	
Dorie Murrey	F/C	Detroit Mercy	1	1966–1967	35	311	102	12	98	8.9	2.9	0.3	2.8	
Mike Muscala	F	Bucknell	1	2023–2024	13	171	29	10	45	13.2	2.2	0.8	3.5	
Sviatoslav Mykhailiuk	G/F	Kansas	3	2018–2021	95	1,919	180	167	759	20.2	1.9	1.8	8.0	

=== N to O ===
All-time roster
Player	Pos.	Pre-draft team	Yrs	Seasons	Statistics									Ref.
Player	Pos.	Pre-draft team	Yrs	Seasons	GP	MP	REB	AST	PTS	MPG	RPG	APG	PPG	Ref.
Jerry Nagel	G	Loyola (IL)	1	1949–1950	14			18	13			1.3	0.9	
Bob Nash	F	Hawaii	2	1972–1974	71	450	108	30	149	6.3	1.5	0.4	2.1	
Jameer Nelson	G	Saint Joseph's	1	2017–2018	7	116	8	23	26	16.6	1.1	3.3	3.7	
Chuck Nevitt	C	NC State	3	1985–1988	83	431	126	9	132	5.2	1.5	0.1	1.6	
Melvin Newbern	G	Minnesota	1	1992–1993	33	311	37	57	119	9.4	1.1	1.7	3.6	
Ivano Newbill	F	Georgia Tech	1	1994–1995	34	331	81	17	40	9.7	2.4	0.5	1.2	
Rich Niemann	C	Saint Louis	1	1968–1969	16	123	41	9	48	7.7	2.6	0.6	3.0	
Richie Niemiera	G/F	Notre Dame	2	1948–1950	86			157	536			1.8	6.2	
Kurt Nimphius	F/C	Arizona State	1	1986–1987	28	277	54	7	96	9.9	1.9	0.3	3.4	
Chuck Noble^{+}	G	Louisville	7	1955–1962	411	9,212	1,075	1,344	3,276	22.4	2.6	3.3	8.0	
Nerlens Noel	F/C	Kentucky	1	2022–2023	14	152	37	7	32	10.9	2.6	0.5	2.3	
Willie Norwood	F	Alcorn State	5	1971–1975; 1977–1978	271	4,339	1,011	187	2,072	16.0	3.7	0.7	7.6	
Jaylen Nowell	G	Washington	1	2023–2024	4	58	10	3	30	14.5	2.5	0.8	7.5	
Charles O'Bannon	G/F	UCLA	2	1997–1999	48	399	67	29	120	8.3	1.4	0.6	2.5	
Ralph O'Brien	G	Butler	1	1952–1953	7	50	0	4	23	7.1	0.0	0.6	3.3	
Don Ohl^{+}	G	Illinois	4	1960–1964	307	10,025	942	1,059	5,137	32.7	3.1	3.4	16.7	
Jahlil Okafor	C	Duke	1	2020–2021	27	347	66	13	145	12.9	2.4	0.5	5.4	
Mehmet Okur	F/C	(Turkey) Efes Pilsen	2	2002–2004	143	2,946	756	140	1,176	20.6	5.3	1.0	8.2	
John Oldham	G	Western Kentucky	2	1949–1951	127		242	226	926		3.6	1.8	7.3	
Bud Olsen	F/C	Louisville	1	1968–1969	10	70	11	7	20	7.0	1.1	0.7	2.0	
Kelly Olynyk	F/C	Gonzaga	1	2021–2022	40	764	177	111	365	19.1	4.4	2.8	9.1	
Eugene Omoruyi	F	Oregon	1	2022–2023	17	373	59	17	165	21.9	3.5	1.0	9.7	
Dan O'Sullivan	C	Fordham	1	1993–1994	13	56	10	3	17	4.3	0.8	0.2	1.3	
Don Otten	C	Bowling Green	2	1950–1952	56	63	315	42	435	9.0	5.6	0.8	7.8	
Billy Owens	G/F	Syracuse	1	2000–2001	45	793	205	55	198	17.6	4.6	1.2	4.4	
Tom Owens	F/C	South Carolina	1	1982–1983	49	725	186	44	207	14.8	3.8	0.9	4.2	

=== P to R ===
All-time roster
Player	Pos.	Pre-draft team	Yrs	Seasons	Statistics									Ref.
Player	Pos.	Pre-draft team	Yrs	Seasons	GP	MP	REB	AST	PTS	MPG	RPG	APG	PPG	Ref.
Zaza Pachulia	C	(Turkey) Ülkerspor	1	2018–2019	68	878	265	91	267	12.9	3.9	1.3	3.9	
Jaysean Paige	G	West Virginia	1	2021–2022	1	7	1	1	0	7.0	1.0	1.0	0.0	
Trayvon Palmer	G	Chicago State	1	2021–2022	1	7	1	1	0	7.0	1.0	1.0	0.0	
Smush Parker	G	Fordham	1	2004–2005	11	110	9	11	33	10.0	0.8	1.0	3.0	
George Patterson	F/C	Toledo	1	1967–1968	59	559	159	51	120	9.5	2.7	0.9	2.0	
Jake Pelkington	F/C	Manhattan	1	1948–1949	14			32	124			2.3	8.9	
Mike Peplowski	C	Michigan State	1	1994–1995	6	21	3	1	11	3.5	0.5	0.2	1.8	
Andy Phillip^	G/F	Illinois	4	1952–1956	262	9,262	812	1,636	2,344	35.4	4.0	6.2	8.9	
Jamorko Pickett	F	Georgetown	1	2021–2022	13	176	32	7	50	13.5	2.5	0.5	3.8	
Ricky Pierce	G	Rice	1	1982–1983	39	265	35	14	85	6.8	0.9	0.4	2.2	
Mason Plumlee	C	Duke	1	2020–2021	56	1,499	519	202	581	26.8	9.3	3.6	10.4	
Scot Pollard	C	Kansas	1	1997–1998	33	317	74	9	89	9.6	2.2	0.3	2.7	
Olden Polynice	F/C	Virginia	2	1992–1994	104	2,649	874	51	972	25.5	8.4	0.5	9.3	
Ben Poquette	F/C	Central Michigan	2	1977–1979	128	1,963	481	77	739	15.3	3.8	0.6	5.8	
Howard Porter	F/C	Villanova	4	1974–1978	202	4,819	986	97	2,173	23.9	4.9	0.5	10.8	
Kevin Porter	G	Saint Francis (PA)	4	1975–1979	190	5,995	366	1,920	2,254	31.6	1.9	10.1	11.9	
Micah Potter	F/C	Wisconsin	1	2021–2022	3	31	9	0	12	10.3	3.0	0.0	4.0	
Jim Price	G	Louisville	1	1977–1978	34	839	101	102	390	24.7	3.0	3.0	11.5	
Tayshaun Prince	F	Kentucky	12	2002–2013; 2014–2015	792	26,166	3,683	2,074	10,006	33.0	4.7	2.6	12.6	
Roy Pugh	F/C	SMU	1	1948–1949	4			1	9			0.3	2.3	
Bob Quick	G/F	Xavier	3	1969–1972	93	1,647	344	78	695	17.7	3.7	0.8	7.5	
Mark Randall	F	Kansas	1	1992–1993	35	240	55	10	97	6.9	1.6	0.3	2.8	
Theo Ratliff	F/C	Wyoming	4	1995–1998; 2007–2008	191	3,406	724	48	985	17.8	3.8	0.3	5.2	
Željko Rebrača	C	(Federal Republic of Yugoslavia) Partizan	3	2001–2004	125	1,889	431	51	777	15.1	3.4	0.4	6.2	
Hub Reed	F/C	Oklahoma City	1	1964–1965	62	753	206	38	208	12.1	3.3	0.6	3.4	
Paul Reed^{x}	C	DePaul	2	2024–2026	110	1,339	417	124	688	12.2	3.8	1.1	6.3	
Ron Reed	F	Notre Dame	2	1965–1967	119	2,245	762	173	951	18.9	6.4	1.5	8.0	
Willie Reed	F/C	Saint Louis	1	2017–2018	3	9	1	1	2	3.0	0.3	0.3	0.7	
Khalid Reeves	G	Arizona	1	1998–1999	11	112	7	11	25	10.2	0.6	1.0	2.3	
Don Reid	F	Georgetown	6	1995–2000; 2002–2003	253	3,563	674	85	911	14.1	2.7	0.3	3.6	
George Reynolds	G	Houston	1	1969–1970	10	44	14	12	21	4.4	1.4	1.2	2.1	
Jared Rhoden	G/F	Seton Hall	2	2022–2024	31	443	70	18	128	14.3	2.3	0.6	4.1	
Jim Riffey	F	Tulane	1	1950–1951	35		61	16	150		1.7	0.5	4.3	
Alvin Robertson	G	Arkansas	1	1992–1993	30	941	132	107	279	31.4	4.4	3.6	9.3	
Clifford Robinson	F/C	UConn	2	2001–2003	161	5,680	704	470	2,158	35.3	4.4	2.9	13.4	
Duncan Robinson^{x}	G/F	Michigan	1	2025–2026	77	2,113	205	159	939	27.4	2.7	2.1	12.2	
Glenn Robinson III	G/F	Michigan	1	2018–2019	47	610	71	21	198	13.0	1.5	0.4	4.2	
Jackie Robinson	F	UNLV	1	1979–1980	7	51	5	0	27	7.3	0.7	0.0	3.9	
Justin Robinson	G	Virginia Tech	1	2021–2022	5	91	7	9	28	18.2	1.4	1.8	5.6	
Wayne Robinson	F	Virginia Tech	1	1980–1981	81	1,592	294	112	643	19.7	3.6	1.4	7.9	
Red Rocha	F/C	Oregon State	1	1956–1957	72	1,154	272	81	381	16.0	3.8	1.1	5.3	
Dennis Rodman^ (#10)	F	Southeastern Oklahoma State	7	1986–1993	549	16,345	6,299	715	4,844	29.8	11.5	1.3	8.8	
Lou Roe	F	UMass	1	1995–1996	49	372	78	15	90	7.6	1.6	0.3	1.8	
Al Roges	G/F	LIU Brooklyn	1	1954–1955										
Tree Rollins	C	Clemson	1	1990–1991	37	202	42	4	36	5.5	1.1	0.1	1.0	
Lorenzo Romar	G	Washington	1	1984–1985	5	35	0	10	9	7.0	0.0	2.0	1.8	
Derrick Rose	G	Memphis	2	2019–2021	65	1,640	150	341	1,117	25.2	2.3	5.2	17.2	
Dick Rosenthal	G/F	Notre Dame	2	1954–1955; 1956–1957	85	1,594	352	170	575	18.8	4.1	2.0	6.8	
Dan Roundfield	F/C	Central Michigan	1	1984–1985	56	1,492	453	102	611	26.6	8.1	1.8	10.9	
Curtis Rowe^{+}	F	UCLA	5	1971–1976	407	13,954	3,256	711	5,407	34.3	8.0	1.7	13.3	
Jim Rowinski	F/C	Purdue	1	1988–1989	6	8	2	0	4	1.3	0.3	0.0	0.7	
Jeff Ruland	F/C	Iona	1	1992–1993	11	55	18	2	12	5.0	1.6	0.2	1.1	
Walker Russell	G	Western Michigan	4	1982–1984; 1985–1986; 1987–1988	86	879	92	155	224	10.2	1.1	1.8	2.6	
Walker Russell Jr.	G	Jacksonville State	1	2011–2012	28	357	26	58	84	12.8	0.9	2.1	3.0	

=== S ===
All-time roster
Player	Pos.	Pre-draft team	Yrs	Seasons	Statistics									Ref.
Player	Pos.	Pre-draft team	Yrs	Seasons	GP	MP	REB	AST	PTS	MPG	RPG	APG	PPG	Ref.
John Salley	F/C	Georgia Tech	6	1986–1992	459	10,261	2,095	495	3,420	22.4	4.6	1.1	7.5	
Cheikh Samb	C	(Spain) WTC Cornellá	1	2007–2008	4	31	7	0	7	7.8	1.8	0.0	1.8	
Juan Ignacio Sánchez	G	Temple	1	2002–2003	9	37	6	8	0	4.1	0.7	0.9	0.0	
Marcus Sasser^{x}	G	Houston	3	2023–2026	166	2,619	233	444	1,158	15.8	1.4	2.7	7.0	
Fred Schaus^{+}	F	West Virginia	5	1949–1954	290	5,394	1,392	873	3,683	35.0	6.3	3.0	12.7	
Dennis Schröder	G	(Germany) Löwen Braunschweig	1	2024–2025	28	705	74	147	302	25.2	2.6	5.3	10.8	
Howie Schultz	F/C	Hamline	1	1949–1950	32			81	271			2.5	8.5	
John Schweitz	G	Richmond	1	1986–1987	3	7	1	0	0	2.3	0.3	0.0	0.0	
Fred Scolari	G	San Francisco	2	1952–1954	80	2,094	186	168	640	26.2	2.3	2.1	8.0	
Ray Scott	F/C	Portland	6	1961–1967	421	13,885	4,508	1,128	6,724	33.0	10.7	2.7	16.0	
Malik Sealy	G	St. John's	1	1997–1998	77	1,641	219	100	591	21.3	2.8	1.3	7.7	
Brad Sellers	F/C	Ohio State	1	1991–1992	43	226	42	14	102	5.3	1.0	0.3	2.4	
Phil Sellers	G/F	Rutgers	1	1976–1977	44	329	41	25	198	7.5	0.9	0.6	4.5	
Chuck Share	C	Bowling Green	3	1951–1954	151	2,081	766	150	638	13.8	5.1	1.0	4.2	
Walter Sharpe	F	UAB	1	2008–2009	8	20	3	0	8	2.5	0.4	0.0	1.0	
Steve Sheppard	F	Maryland	1	1978–1979	20	76	19	4	32	3.8	1.0	0.2	1.6	
Gene Shue^{+}	G	Maryland	6	1956–1962	440	17,390	2,204	1,931	8,034	39.5	5.0	4.4	18.3	
John Shumate	F/C	Notre Dame	2	1977–1978; 1979–1980	71	2,398	624	131	1,045	33.8	8.8	1.8	14.7	
Ralph Simpson	G/F	Michigan State	2	1976–1978	109	2,336	263	267	1,190	21.4	2.4	2.4	10.9	
Kyle Singler	F	Duke	3	2012–2015	218	5,917	772	219	1,889	27.1	3.5	1.0	8.7	
Zeke Sinicola	G	Niagara	2	1951–1952; 1953–1954	12	48	2	3	13	4.0	0.2	0.3	1.1	
Deividas Sirvydis	G/F	(Lithuania) Rytas Vilnius	2	2020–2022	23	160	35	6	44	7.0	1.5	0.3	1.9	
Peyton Siva	G	Louisville	1	2013–2014	24	224	14	34	54	9.3	0.6	1.4	2.3	
Al Skinner	G	UMass	1	1977–1978	69	1,274	172	113	485	18.5	2.5	1.6	7.0	
Jack Smiley	G/F	Illinois	1	1948–1949	59			138	394			2.3	6.7	
Dennis Smith Jr.	G	NC State	1	2020–2021	20	392	53	74	145	19.6	2.7	3.7	7.3	
Ish Smith	G	Wake Forest	3	2016–2019	219	5,249	604	981	2,153	24.0	2.8	4.5	9.8	
Jim Smith	F	Ohio State	1	1982–1983	4	18	5	0	8	4.5	1.3	0.0	2.0	
Joe Smith	F	Maryland	1	2000–2001	69	1,941	491	79	847	28.1	7.1	1.1	12.3	
Josh Smith	F	Oak Hill Academy (VA)	2	2013–2015	105	3,626	722	384	1,631	34.5	6.9	3.7	15.5	
Kenny Smith	G	North Carolina	1	1996–1997	9	64	5	10	23	7.1	0.6	1.1	2.6	
Tolu Smith^{x}	F	Mississippi State	2	2024–2026	16	159	57	13	70	9.9	3.6	0.8	4.4	
Tony Snell	G/F	New Mexico	1	2019–2020	59	1,641	111	127	474	27.8	1.9	2.2	8.0	
Odie Spears	G	Western Kentucky	2	1955–1957	72	1,378	231	121	491	19.1	3.2	1.7	6.8	
Jerry Stackhouse^{+}	G/F	North Carolina	5	1997–2002	337	12,033	1,242	1,470	7,451	35.7	3.7	4.4	22.1	
Cassius Stanley	G	Duke	1	2021–2022	9	155	19	4	52	17.2	2.1	0.4	5.8	
Larry Staverman	F	Thomas More	1	1963–1964	20	255	69	12	114	12.8	3.5	0.6	5.7	
Brook Steppe	G/F	Georgia Tech	1	1984–1985	54	486	57	36	253	9.0	1.1	0.7	4.7	
Isaiah Stewart^{x}	F/C	Washington	6	2020–2026	365	8,859	2,467	473	3,212	24.3	6.8	1.3	8.8	
Joe Strawder	C	Bradley	3	1965–1968	231	6,365	2,296	245	1,977	27.6	9.9	1.1	8.6	
Rodney Stuckey	G	Eastern Washington	7	2007–2014	483	14,045	1,424	1,888	6,491	29.1	2.9	3.9	13.4	
DaJuan Summers	F	Georgetown	2	2009–2011	66	604	57	18	208	9.2	0.9	0.3	3.2	
Bob Sura	G	Florida State	1	2003–2004	53	707	103	89	199	13.3	1.9	1.7	3.8	
Cole Swider	F	Syracuse	1	2024–2025	2	13	2	1	0	6.5	1.0	0.5	0.0	

=== T ===
All-time roster
Player	Pos.	Pre-draft team	Yrs	Seasons	Statistics									Ref.
Player	Pos.	Pre-draft team	Yrs	Seasons	GP	MP	REB	AST	PTS	MPG	RPG	APG	PPG	Ref.
Earl Tatum	G/F	Marquette	1	1978–1979	76	1,195	121	72	592	15.7	1.6	0.9	7.8	
Jeff Taylor	G	Texas Tech	1	1986–1987	12	44	4	3	21	3.7	0.3	0.3	1.8	
Terry Teagle	G/F	Baylor	1	1984–1985	2	5	0	0	2	2.5	0.0	0.0	1.0	
Bill Thieben	F/C	Hofstra	2	1956–1958	85	876	272	24	337	10.3	3.2	0.3	4.0	
Justus Thigpen	G	Weber State	1	1972–1973	18	99	9	8	46	5.5	0.5	0.4	2.6	
David Thirdkill	G/F	Bradley	2	1983–1985	56	406	39	28	106	7.3	0.7	0.5	1.9	
Charles Thomas	G	Eastern Michigan	1	1991–1992	36	156	22	22	48	4.3	0.6	0.6	1.3	
Isiah Thomas^	G	Indiana	13	1981–1994	979	35,516	3,478	9,061	18,822	36.3	3.6	9.3	19.2	
Khyri Thomas	G	Creighton	2	2018–2020	34	256	21	11	78	7.5	0.6	0.3	2.3	
Terry Thomas	F	Detroit Mercy	1	1975–1976	28	136	36	3	77	4.9	1.3	0.1	2.8	
Ausar Thompson^{x}	F	City Reapers (Overtime Elite)	3	2023–2026	195	4,807	1,123	482	1,871	24.7	5.8	2.5	9.6	
Rod Thorn^	G	West Virginia	2	1964–1966	101	2,585	367	225	1,192	25.6	3.6	2.2	11.8	
Otis Thorpe	F/C	Providence	2	1995–1997	161	5,502	1,310	291	2,197	34.2	8.1	1.8	13.6	
Ray Tolbert	F	Indiana	2	1982–1984	77	870	189	45	293	11.3	2.5	0.6	3.8	
Anthony Tolliver	F/C	Creighton	3	2014–2016; 2017–2018	203	4,258	662	191	1,488	21.0	3.3	0.9	7.3	
Bob Tough	G/F	St. John's	1	1948–1949	53			99	466			1.9	8.8	
Carlisle Towery	F/C	Western Kentucky	1	1948–1949	22			35	164			1.6	7.5	
George Trapp	F/C	Long Beach State	4	1973–1977	242	4,120	828	197	2,092	17.0	3.4	0.8	8.6	
John Tresvant	F/C	Seattle	3	1965–1968	169	3,980	1,302	264	1,792	23.6	7.7	1.6	10.6	
Dick Triptow	G/F	DePaul	1	1948–1949	55			96	334			1.7	6.1	
Kelly Tripucka^{+}	G/F	Notre Dame	5	1981–1986	352	12,123	1,579	1,135	7,597	34.4	4.5	3.2	21.6	
Terry Tyler	G/F	Detroit Mercy	7	1978–1985	574	15,917	3,583	776	6,638	27.7	6.2	1.4	11.6	

=== U to Z ===
All-time roster
Player	Pos.	Pre-draft team	Yrs	Seasons	Statistics									Ref.
Player	Pos.	Pre-draft team	Yrs	Seasons	GP	MP	REB	AST	PTS	MPG	RPG	APG	PPG	Ref.
Beno Udrih	G	(Italy) Olimpia Milano	1	2016–2017	39	560	57	131	227	14.4	1.5	3.4	5.8	
Stanley Umude	G	Arkansas	2	2022–2024	25	309	51	11	129	12.4	2.0	0.4	5.2	
Tom Van Arsdale	G/F	Indiana	3	1965–1968	208	5,007	782	477	2,128	24.1	3.8	2.3	10.2	
Ratko Varda	C	(Federal Republic of Yugoslavia) Partizan	1	2001–2002	1	6	1	0	5	6.0	1.0	0.0	5.0	
Chico Vaughn	G	Southern Illinois	2	1965–1967	88	1,454	130	179	500	16.5	1.5	2.0	5.7	
Loy Vaught	F	Michigan	2	1998–2000	80	773	237	22	202	9.7	3.0	0.3	2.5	
Charlie Villanueva	F	UConn	5	2009–2014	256	4,966	983	167	2,421	19.4	3.8	0.7	9.5	
Clint Wager	F/C	Saint Mary's Minnesota	1	1949–1950	63			90	143			1.4	2.3	
Andre Wakefield	G	Loyola (IL)	1	1978–1979	71	578	76	69	172	8.1	1.1	1.0	2.4	
Darrell Walker	G	Arkansas	2	1991–1993	83	1,685	257	214	395	20.3	3.1	2.6	4.8	
Jimmy Walker^{+}	G	Providence	5	1967–1972	388	11,941	972	1,278	6,262	30.8	2.5	3.3	16.1	
Ben Wallace^ (#3)	F/C	Virginia Union	9	2000–2006; 2009–2012	655	21,358	7,264	997	4,337	32.6	11.1	1.5	6.6	
John Wallace	F	Syracuse	1	2000–2001	40	527	83	23	237	13.2	2.1	0.6	5.9	
Rasheed Wallace^{+}	F/C	North Carolina	6	2003–2009	399	13,028	2,890	719	5,356	32.7	7.2	1.8	13.4	
Paul Walther	G/F	Tennessee	1	1954–1955	68	820	155	131	166	12.1	2.3	1.9	2.4	
Derrick Walton	G	Michigan	2	2019–2020; 2021–2022	6	134	11	26	22	22.3	1.8	4.3	3.7	
Bob Warlick	G/F	Pepperdine	1	1965–1966	10	78	16	10	24	7.8	1.6	1.0	2.4	
Lindy Waters III	G	Oklahoma State	1	2024–2025	14	123	14	10	47	8.8	1.0	0.7	3.4	
Chris Webber^	F/C	Michigan	1	2006–2007	43	1,277	288	127	486	29.7	6.7	3.0	11.3	
Mark West	F/C	Old Dominion	2	1994–1996	114	2,225	541	24	650	19.5	4.7	0.2	5.7	
Rodney White	F	Charlotte	1	2001–2002	16	129	18	12	56	8.1	1.1	0.8	3.5	
Chris Wilcox	F	Maryland	2	2009–2011	91	1,436	388	56	576	15.8	4.3	0.6	6.3	
James Wilkes	F	UCLA	1	1982–1983	9	129	19	10	34	14.3	2.1	1.1	3.8	
Damien Wilkins	G/F	Georgia	1	2011–2012	60	922	100	44	193	15.4	1.7	0.7	3.2	
Dale Wilkinson	F	Idaho State	1	1984–1985	2	7	1	0	0	3.5	0.5	0.0	0.0	
Alondes Williams	G	Wake Forest	1	2024–2025	1	4	0	1	5	4.0	0.0	1.0	5.0	
Cliff Williams	G	Bowling Green	1	1968–1969	3	18	3	2	4	6.0	1.0	0.7	1.3	
Earl Williams	F/C	Winston-Salem State	1	1975–1976	46	562	251	18	168	12.2	5.5	0.4	3.7	
Jerome Williams	F	Georgetown	5	1996–2001	275	5,542	1,845	178	1,744	20.2	6.7	0.6	6.3	
Micheal Williams	G	Baylor	1	1988–1989	49	358	27	70	127	7.3	0.6	1.4	2.6	
Shawne Williams	F	Memphis	1	2014–2015	19	163	27	8	49	8.6	1.4	0.4	2.6	
Ward Williams	F	Indiana	1	1948–1949	53			82	215			1.5	4.1	
Corliss Williamson	F	Arkansas	4	2000–2004	266	6,136	1,101	283	3,213	23.1	4.1	1.1	12.1	
Isaiah Wilson	G	Baltimore	1	1971–1972	48	322	47	41	167	6.7	1.0	0.9	3.5	
Tony Windis	G	Wyoming	1	1959–1960	9	193	47	32	36	21.4	5.2	3.6	4.0	
James Wiseman	C	Memphis	2	2022–2024	87	1,696	530	70	751	19.5	6.1	0.8	8.6	
Christian Wood	F/C	UNLV	1	2019–2020	62	1,325	390	60	810	21.4	6.3	1.0	13.1	
David Wood	F	Nevada	1	1993–1994	78	1,182	239	51	322	15.2	3.1	0.7	4.1	
Orlando Woolridge	F	Notre Dame	2	1991–1993	132	3,590	436	200	1,801	27.2	3.3	1.5	13.6	
Tom Workman	F/C	Seattle	1	1969–1970	2	6	0	0	0	3.0	0.0	0.0	0.0	
Delon Wright	G	Utah	1	2020–2021	36	1,052	164	181	374	29.2	4.6	5.0	10.4	
Larry Wright	G	Grambling State	2	1980–1982	46	1,003	88	153	335	21.8	1.9	3.3	7.3	
George Yardley^	G/F	Stanford	6	1953–1959	384	12,945	3,537	668	7,339	33.7	9.2	1.7	19.1	
Danny Young	G	Wake Forest	1	1992–1993	65	836	47	119	188	12.9	0.7	1.8	2.9	
Korleone Young	F	Hargrave Military Academy (VA)	1	1998–1999	3	15	4	1	13	5.0	1.3	0.3	4.3	
Max Zaslofsky	G/F	St. John's	3	1953–1956	124	3,208	296	317	1,368	25.9	2.4	2.6	11.0	
Jim Zoet	C	Kent State	1	1982–1983	7	30	8	1	2	4.3	1.1	0.1	0.3	
