= 1949 NCAA Men's Basketball All-Americans =

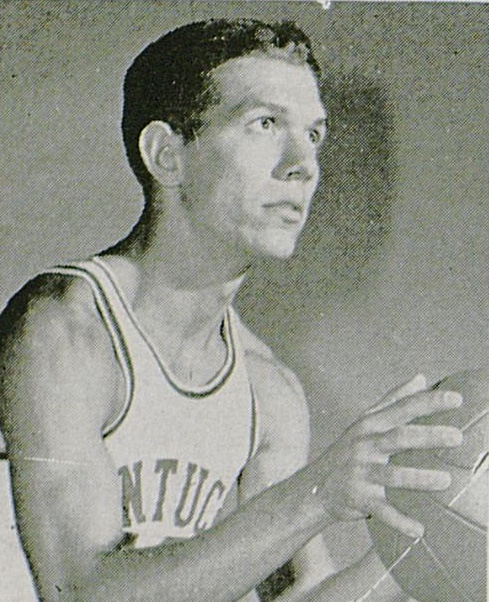
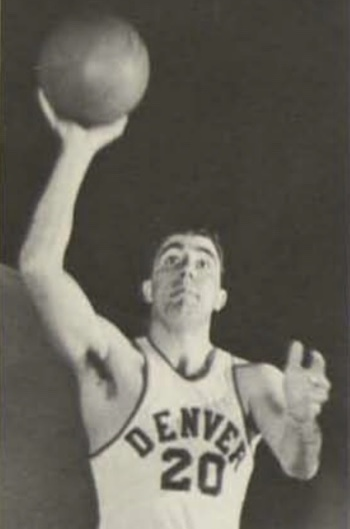
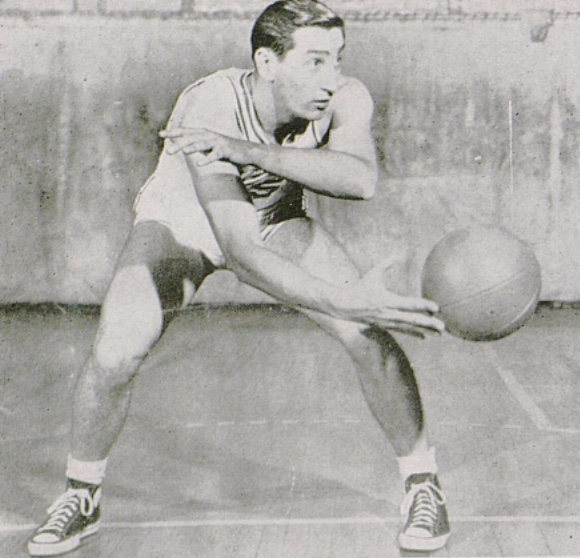
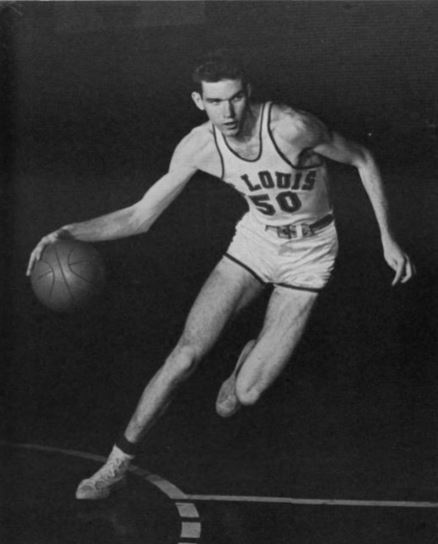
- Members of the 1949 Consensus All-America first team. Clockwise from upper left: Beard, Boryla, Macauley and Groza (not pictured: Lavelli).
- Awarded for: 1948–49 NCAA men's basketball season

The consensus 1949 College Basketball All-American team, as determined by aggregating the results of four major All-American teams. To earn "consensus" status, a player must win honors from a majority of the following teams: the Associated Press, Look Magazine, The United Press International, and Collier's Magazine.

== 1949 Consensus All-America team ==
Consensus First Team
| Player | Position | Class | Team |
|---|---|---|---|
| Ralph Beard | G | Senior | Kentucky |
| Vince Boryla | F | Junior | Denver |
| Alex Groza | C | Senior | Kentucky |
| Tony Lavelli | F | Senior | Yale |
| Ed Macauley | F | Senior | Saint Louis |

Consensus Second Team
| Player | Position | Class | Team |
|---|---|---|---|
| Bill Erickson | G | Junior | Illinois |
| Vern Gardner | F | Senior | Utah |
| Wallace Jones | F | Senior | Kentucky |
| Jim McIntyre | C | Senior | Minnesota |
| Ernie Vandeweghe | G | Senior | Colgate |

== Individual All-America teams ==
All-America Team
| All-America Team | First team | | Second team | | Third team | |
| All-America Team | Player | School | Player | School | Player | School |
|---|---|---|---|---|---|---|
| Associated Press | Ralph Beard | Kentucky | Bob Cousy | Holy Cross | Jim McIntyre | Minnesota |
| Associated Press | Vince Boryla | Denver | Dwight Eddleman | Illinois | Kevin O'Shea | Notre Dame |
| Associated Press | Alex Groza | Kentucky | Vern Gardner | Utah | Dick Schnittker | Ohio State |
| Associated Press | Tony Lavelli | Yale | Bob Harris | Oklahoma A&M | Whitey Skoog | Minnesota |
| Associated Press | Ed Macauley | Saint Louis | Wallace Jones | Kentucky | Ernie Vandeweghe | Colgate |
| UPI | Ralph Beard | Kentucky | Vince Boryla | Denver | Bill Erickson | Illinois |
| UPI | Alex Groza | Kentucky | Bob Cousy | Holy Cross | Dick McGuire | St. John's |
| UPI | Wallace Jones | Kentucky | Dwight Eddleman | Illinois | John Oldham | Western Kentucky |
| UPI | Tony Lavelli | Yale | Vern Gardner | Utah | Dick Schnittker | Ohio State |
| UPI | Ed Macauley | Saint Louis | Bob Harris | Oklahoma A&M | Ernie Vandeweghe | Colgate |
| Look Magazine | Vince Boryla | Denver | Ralph Beard | Kentucky | No third team | |
| Look Magazine | Vern Gardner | Utah | Bob Cousy | Holy Cross | No third team | |
| Look Magazine | Alex Groza | Kentucky | Slater Martin | Texas | No third team | |
| Look Magazine | Tony Lavelli | Yale | Jim McIntyre | Minnesota | No third team | |
| Look Magazine | Ed Macauley | Saint Louis | Ernie Vandeweghe | Colgate | No third team | |
| Collier's | Ralph Beard | Kentucky | No second or third team | | | |
| Collier's | Vince Boryla | Denver | No second or third team | | | |
| Collier's | Bill Erickson | Illinois | No second or third team | | | |
| Collier's | Ed Macauley | Saint Louis | No second or third team | | | |
| Collier's | Jim McIntyre | Minnesota | No second or third team | | | |
| Collier's | Ernie Vandeweghe | Colgate | No second or third team | | | |

AP Honorable Mention

- Paul Arizin, Villanova
- Cliff Barker, Kentucky
- Leo Barnhorst, Notre Dame
- Leroy Chollet, Canisius
- Chuck Cooper, Duquesne
- Paul Courty, Oklahoma
- Dick Dickey, North Carolina State
- Pete Elliott, Michigan
- Bill Erickson, Illinois
- Bill Evans, Drake
- Ed Gayda, Washington State
- Chet Giermak, William & Mary
- Bob Harrison, Michigan
- Rene Herrerias, San Francisco
- Jack Kerris, Loyola (Illinois)
- Lou Lehman, Saint Louis
- Slater Martin, Texas
- Dick McGuire, St. John's
- Vern Mikkelsen, Hamline
- Joe Noertker, Virginia
- Ralph O'Brien, Butler
- John Oldham, Western Kentucky
- J. L. Parks, Oklahoma A&M
- Warren Perkins, Tulane
- Sam Ranzino, North Carolina State
- Don Rehfeldt, Wisconsin
- Jim Riffey, Tulane
- Frank Saul, Seton Hall
- Fred Schaus, West Virginia
- Chuck Share, Bowling Green
- Bill Sharman, Southern California
- Paul Unruh, Bradley
- Paul Walther, Tennessee
- Howie Williams, Purdue
- Johnny Wilson, Anderson

== See also ==
- 1948–49 NCAA men's basketball season
