= Paul Courty =

American basketball player

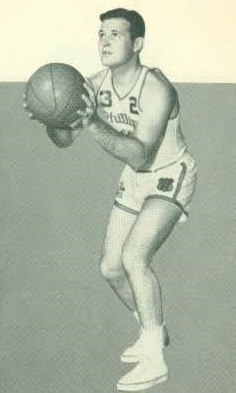
- Courty with the Phillips 66ers.

Personal information
- Born: September 14, 1925 Missouri
- Died: December 10, 2008 (aged 83) Tampa, Florida
- Listed height: 6 ft 3 in (1.91 m)
- Listed weight: 187 lb (85 kg)

Career information
- College: Oklahoma (1945–1949)
- NBA draft: 1949: – round, –
- Drafted by: Providence Steamrollers
- Playing career: 1949–1952
- Position: Forward

Career history
- 1949–1952: Phillips 66ers

Career highlights
- Third-team All-American – Helms (1948); AP honorable mention All-American (1949); All-Big Eight (1946); 2× All-Big Seven (1948, 1949)
- Stats at Basketball Reference

Paul Jack "Lefty" Courty (September 14, 1925 – December 10, 2008), from Windsor, Missouri, was an American basketball player who had a successful career at the University of Oklahoma from 1945 to 1949. He then played in the Amateur Athletic Union (AAU) for the Phillips 66ers despite being selected in the 1949 BAA draft by the Providence Steamrollers.

Courty was a three-time all-conference selection while an Oklahoma Sooner. As a sophomore in 1946–47, he was a key player on the squad that advance to the 1947 NCAA national championship game before losing to Holy Cross. Courty led the team in scoring in his final two seasons, both of which saw him get named an NCAA All-American.

Professionally, he decided to pursue a career playing for the Phillips 66ers, a powerful AAU squad during the mid-20th century. He played for three seasons before calling it quits in July 1952. Courty remained at the Phillips Petroleum Company, the company sponsoring the 66ers, in a professional capacity after his basketball career ended.
