= 1950–51 Fort Wayne Pistons season =

NBA team season

- Head coach: Murray Mendenhall
- Owner: Fred Zollner
- Arena: North Side High School Gym

Results
- Record: 32–36 (.471)
- Place: Division: 3rd (Western)
- Playoff finish: West Division Semifinals (eliminated 1–2)
- Stats at Basketball Reference

The 1950–51 Fort Wayne Pistons season was the Pistons' third season in the NBA and tenth season as a franchise. This season would be notable for an infamous match played on November 22, 1950, against the Minneapolis Lakers, with the Pistons holding onto the ball for a vast majority of the match in order to not allow opposing star center George Mikan to dominate them in the paint, which worked too well to the point where it resulted in the lowest-scoring match in NBA history with a 19–18 victory favoring the Pistons (and subsequently breaking a record previously held by the Detroit Falcons for the lowest scoring effort in a BAA/NBA match), which resulted in spectators of the match feeling like they wouldn't be interested in the sport of basketball at all if that match was a reflection of what it truly was and subsequently led to the creation of the shot clock a few seasons later in order to help make sure the NBA never had another game like that ever again in its history.

The Pistons finished with a 32-36 (.471) record, good for third in the West Division. The team advanced to the playoffs, losing in the division semifinals 2–1 to the Rochester Royals. The team was led by forward Fred Schaus (15.1 ppg, 7.3 rpg, NBA All-Star) and the double-double of center Larry Foust (13.5 ppg, 10.0 rpg, NBA All-Star). The team drafted future star George Yardley in the 1950 NBA draft, but Yardley would sit out three years, opting to play AAU basketball, then serving in the United States Navy, getting married, and joining Fort Wayne for the 1953-54 Fort Wayne Pistons season.

== Draft picks ==
| Round | Pick | Player | Position | Nationality | College |
|---|---|---|---|---|---|
| 1 | 7 | George Yardley | G/F | United States | Stanford |
| 2 | 19 | Jim Riffey | F | United States | Tulane |
| 3 | 31 | Art Burris | F | United States | Tennessee |

== Roster ==
Fort Wayne Pistons 1950–51 roster
Players
Coaches

| Pos. | # | Name | Ht. | Wt. | From |
|---|---|---|---|---|---|---|
| G/F | 3 | Curly Armstrong | 5 ft 11 in (1.80 m) | 170 lb (77 kg) | | Indiana |
| SF | 12 | Art Burris | 6 ft 5 in (1.96 m) | 220 lb (100 kg) | | Tennessee |
| F/C | 10 | Bob Carpenter | 6 ft 5 in (1.96 m) | 200 lb (91 kg) | | East Texas A&M |
| C | 16 | Larry Foust | 6 ft 9 in (2.06 m) | 215 lb (98 kg) | | La Salle |
| G/F | 14 | John Hargis | 6 ft 2 in (1.88 m) | 180 lb (82 kg) | | Texas |
| F/C | 9 | Bob Harris | 6 ft 7 in (2.01 m) | 195 lb (88 kg) | | Oklahoma State |
| PG | 5 | Boag Johnson | 5 ft 11 in (1.80 m) | 170 lb (77 kg) | | Huntington |
| PF | 15 | Jack Kerris | 6 ft 6 in (1.98 m) | 215 lb (98 kg) | | Loyola Chicago |
| G | 6 | Duane Klueh | 6 ft 3 in (1.91 m) | 175 lb (79 kg) | | Indiana State |
| PF | 10 | Dick Mehen | 6 ft 5 in (1.96 m) | 195 lb (88 kg) | | Tennessee |
| SG | 9 | Ken Murray | 6 ft 2 in (1.88 m) | 190 lb (86 kg) | | St. Bonaventure |
| G | 4 | John Oldham | 6 ft 3 in (1.91 m) | 175 lb (79 kg) | | Western Kentucky |
| C | 17 | Don Otten | 6 ft 10 in (2.08 m) | 240 lb (109 kg) | | Bowling Green |
| F | 9, 17 | Jim Riffey | 6 ft 4 in (1.93 m) | 200 lb (91 kg) | | Tulane |
| F | 8 | Fred Schaus | 6 ft 5 in (1.96 m) | 205 lb (93 kg) | | West Virginia |

Head coach
- Murray Mendenhall

Legend
- (DP) Unsigned draft pick
- (FA) Free agent
- (S) Suspended
- Injured

== Regular season ==
=== Season standings ===
| Western Division | W | L | PCT | GB | Home | Road | Neutral | Div |
|---|---|---|---|---|---|---|---|---|
| x-Minneapolis Lakers | 44 | 24 | .647 | – | 29–3 | 12–21 | 3–0 | 24–12 |
| x-Rochester Royals | 41 | 27 | .603 | 3 | 29–5 | 12–22 | – | 18–15 |
| x-Fort Wayne Pistons | 32 | 36 | .471 | 12 | 27–7 | 5–27 | 0–2 | 18–6 |
| x-Indianapolis Olympians | 31 | 37 | .456 | 13 | 19–12 | 10–24 | 2–1 | 15–20 |
| Tri-Cities Blackhawks | 25 | 43 | .368 | 19 | 22–13 | 2–28 | 1–2 | 12–24 |

x – clinched playoff spot

=== Game log ===
1950–51 game log
| # | Date | Opponent | Score | High points | Record |
| 1 | November 1 | Boston | 107–84 | Larry Foust (21) | 1–0 |
| 2 | November 2 | @ Syracuse | 77–92 | Boag Johnson (21) | 1–1 |
| 3 | November 4 | @ Rochester | 71–95 | John Hargis (16) | 1–2 |
| 4 | November 5 | Indianapolis | 68–63 | Larry Foust (20) | 2–2 |
| 5 | November 8 | Tri-Cities | 87–79 | Boag Johnson (18) | 3–2 |
| 6 | November 9 | @ Philadelphia | 72–87 | Fred Schaus (20) | 3–3 |
| 7 | November 11 | @ Baltimore | 77–85 | Boag Johnson (13) | 3–4 |
| 8 | November 12 | Washington | 87–73 | Fred Schaus (18) | 4–4 |
| 9 | November 15 | Rochester | 89–85 | John Oldham (23) | 5–4 |
| 10 | November 18 | @ Washington | 75–118 | Boag Johnson (14) | 5–5 |
| 11 | November 19 | Baltimore | 84–80 | Jack Kerris (17) | 6–5 |
| 12 | November 22 | @ Minneapolis | 19–18 | John Oldham (5) | 7–5 |
| 13 | November 23 | Minneapolis | 73–63 | Larry Foust (19) | 8–5 |
| 14 | November 25 | @ Tri-Cities | 71–85 | Fred Schaus (20) | 8–6 |
| 15 | November 26 | Indianapolis | 79–70 | Larry Foust (22) | 9–6 |
| 16 | November 28 | @ Indianapolis | 66–90 | John Oldham (12) | 9–7 |
| 17 | December 3 | Rochester | 80–79 | Larry Foust (22) | 10–7 |
| 18 | December 6 | Philadelphia | 92–73 | Fred Schaus (17) | 11–7 |
| 19 | December 7 | @ Tri-Cities | 77–76 | Fred Schaus (22) | 12–7 |
| 20 | December 10 | Washington | 97–81 | Boag Johnson (20) | 13–7 |
| 21 | December 12 | @ Boston | 81–87 | Fred Schaus (20) | 13–8 |
| 22 | December 14 | @ Philadelphia | 82–94 | Fred Schaus (17) | 13–9 |
| 23 | December 16 | @ New York | 77–86 | Fred Schaus (19) | 13–10 |
| 24 | December 17 | Tri-Cities | 99–103 | Fred Schaus (26) | 13–11 |
| 25 | December 19 | @ Indianapolis | 93–92 | Fred Schaus (26) | 14–11 |
| 26 | December 21 | Syracuse | 97–72 | Jack Kerris (26) | 15–11 |
| 27 | December 23 | @ Rochester | 65–77 | Larry Foust (15) | 15–12 |
| 28 | December 25 | @ Syracuse | 69–81 | Boag Johnson (14) | 15–13 |
| 29 | December 27 | Rochester | 68–74 | Boag Johnson (13) | 15–14 |
| 30 | December 31 | @ Tri-Cities | 100–110 | Fred Schaus (33) | 15–15 |
| 31 | January 1 | Minneapolis | 83–70 | Larry Foust (17) | 16–15 |
| 32 | January 3 | @ Minneapolis | 64–86 | Fred Schaus (21) | 16–16 |
| 33 | January 4 | Indianapolis | 83–94 | Fred Schaus (23) | 16–17 |
| 34 | January 6 | @ Washington | 91–76 | Boag Johnson (20) | 17–17 |
| 35 | January 7 | New York | 76–79 | Fred Schaus (21) | 17–18 |
| 36 | January 8 | vs New York | 70–75 (OT) | Fred Schaus (19) | 17–19 |
| 37 | January 11 | Syracuse | 84–76 | Fred Schaus (16) | 18–19 |
| 38 | January 12 | @ Indianapolis | 89–81 | Larry Foust (24) | 19–19 |
| 39 | January 13 | @ Rochester | 78–99 | Fred Schaus (20) | 19–20 |
| 40 | January 14 | Tri-Cities | 94–85 | Johnson, Schaus (19) | 20–20 |
| 41 | January 20 | vs Minneapolis | 70–89 | Jack Kerris (19) | 20–21 |
| 42 | January 21 | Boston | 106–112 (OT) | Fred Schaus (25) | 20–22 |
| 43 | January 25 | @ Boston | 97–99 | Fred Schaus (18) | 20–23 |
| 44 | January 27 | @ Baltimore | 91–97 | Kerris, Schaus (22) | 20–24 |
| 45 | January 28 | Rochester | 93–88 | Fred Schaus (16) | 21–24 |
| 46 | January 31 | Philadelphia | 91–84 | Jack Kerris (18) | 22–24 |
| 47 | February 1 | @ Tri-Cities | 102–109 | Larry Foust (24) | 22–25 |
| 48 | February 4 | Baltimore | 95–108 | John Oldham (20) | 22–26 |
| 49 | February 7 | Minneapolis | 96–86 | Kerris, Oldham (20) | 23–26 |
| 50 | February 10 | @ New York | 62–73 | Fred Schaus (16) | 23–27 |
| 51 | February 11 | New York | 120–96 | Fred Schaus (22) | 24–27 |
| 52 | February 13 | @ Indianapolis | 78–80 | Larry Foust (16) | 24–28 |
| 53 | February 14 | Syracuse | 77–75 | Fred Schaus (19) | 25–28 |
| 54 | February 17 | @ Baltimore | 91–112 | Oldham, Schaus (18) | 25–29 |
| 55 | February 18 | Philadelphia | 75–70 | Jack Kerris (18) | 26–29 |
| 56 | February 24 | @ Minneapolis | 78–95 | Jack Kerris (18) | 26–30 |
| 57 | February 25 | Baltimore | 102–92 | Larry Foust (27) | 27–30 |
| 58 | February 28 | Minneapolis | 77–73 | Larry Foust (22) | 28–30 |
| 59 | March 1 | @ Syracuse | 86–108 | Foust, Oldham (15) | 28–31 |
| 60 | March 3 | @ Rochester | 79–89 | Fred Schaus (17) | 28–32 |
| 61 | March 4 | New York | 105–98 | Jack Kerris (26) | 29–32 |
| 62 | March 6 | @ Tri-Cities | 86–88 | John Oldham (19) | 29–33 |
| 63 | March 7 | Boston | 95–99 | Jack Kerris (20) | 29–34 |
| 64 | March 11 | Tri-Cities | 102–87 | Larry Foust (19) | 30–34 |
| 65 | March 14 | Indianapolis | 115–109 | Jack Kerris (24) | 31–34 |
| 66 | March 15 | @ Philadelphia | 78–88 | Larry Foust (14) | 31–35 |
| 67 | March 16 | @ Boston | 88–90 | Fred Schaus (22) | 31–36 |
| 68 | March 18 | Tri-Cities | 95–82 | Don Otten (18) | 32–36 |

== Playoffs ==
1951 playoff game log
Division Semifinals: 1–2 (home: 1–0; road: 0–2)

| Game | Date | Team | Score | High points | Location | Series |
|---|---|---|---|---|---|---|
| 1 | March 20 | @ Rochester | L 81–110 | Dick Mehen (19) | Edgerton Park Arena | 0–1 |
| 2 | March 22 | Rochester | W 83–78 | Fred Schaus (21) | North Side High School Gym | 1–1 |
| 3 | March 24 | @ Rochester | L 78–97 | Fred Schaus (12) | Edgerton Park Arena | 1–2 |

1951 schedule

== See also ==
- 1950–51 NBA season
