= Jim McIntyre (basketball) =

American basketball player

Personal information
- Born: October 9, 1927 Minneapolis, Minnesota, U.S.
- Died: December 10, 2005 (aged 78)
- Listed height: 6 ft 10 in (2.08 m)

Career information
- High school: Camden (Minneapolis, Minnesota)
- College: Minnesota (1945–1949)
- Position: Center

Career highlights
- Consensus first-team All-American (1948); Consensus second-team All-American (1949); 2× First-team All-Big Ten (1947, 1948); Second-team All-Big Ten (1949)
- Stats at Basketball Reference

James Keith McIntyre (October 9, 1927 – December 10, 2005) was an American basketball player for the University of Minnesota from 1945 to 1949. A native of Minneapolis, Minnesota, he led Camden High School (then Henry High School) to two state championships before becoming a two-time consensus All-American at Minnesota. McIntyre is recognized as being the University of Minnesota's first true "big man." Standing at 6 ft 10 in (2.08 m) and playing the center position, he was especially large for players of the late 1940s era. During his career, he was a two-time First Team All-Big Ten Conference and one-time Second Team All-Big Ten selection. McIntyre scored 1,223 points and had set a then-single season Minnesota scoring record of 360 points.

Despite his success on the basketball court, McIntyre was never drafted into the National Basketball Association. He spent most of his later life as a Presbyterian reverend in the Twin Cities area and died on December 10, 2005, because of an infection.
