= Jerry Nagel =

American basketball player (1928–1999)

Personal information
- Born: May 18, 1928 Chicago, Illinois, U.S.
- Died: February 2, 1999 (aged 70) Chicago, Illinois, U.S.
- Listed height: 6 ft 0 in (1.83 m)
- Listed weight: 190 lb (86 kg)

Career information
- High school: LaSalle-Peru (LaSalle, Illinois)
- College: Loyola Chicago (1946–1949)
- BAA draft: 1949: 4th round, –
- Drafted by: Fort Wayne Pistons
- Playing career: 1949–1950
- Position: Guard
- Number: 9

Career history
- 1949–1950: Fort Wayne Pistons

Career NBA statistics
- Points: 13 (0.9 ppg)
- Assists: 18 (1.3 apg)
- Stats at NBA.com
- Stats at Basketball Reference

Gerald R. Nagel (May 18, 1928 – February 2, 1999) was an American professional basketball player. Nagel was selected in the fourth round in the 1949 BAA Draft by the Fort Wayne Pistons. He played for the Pistons in 1949–50 before ending his NBA career after one season.

== Career statistics ==
Legend
GP	Games played	GS	Games started	MPG	Minutes per game
FG%	Field goal percentage	3P%	3-point field goal percentage	FT%	Free throw percentage
RPG	Rebounds per game	APG	Assists per game	SPG	Steals per game
BPG	Blocks per game	PPG	Points per game	**Bold**	Career high

=== NBA ===
==== Regular season ====
Year	Team	GP	FG%	FT%	APG	PPG
1949–50	Fort Wayne	14	.214	.250	1.3	.9
