= Art Burris =

American basketball player

Personal information
- Born: April 7, 1924 Nashville, Tennessee, U.S.
- Died: September 19, 1993 (aged 69)
- Listed height: 6 ft 5 in (1.96 m)
- Listed weight: 220 lb (100 kg)

Career information
- College: Tennessee (1947–1950)
- NBA draft: 1950: 3rd round, 31st overall pick
- Drafted by: Fort Wayne Pistons
- Playing career: 1950–1952
- Position: Small forward
- Number: 12, 15

Career history
- 1950–1952: Fort Wayne Pistons
- 1952: Milwaukee Hawks

Career NBA statistics
- Points: 187 (2.5 ppg)
- Rebounds: 205 (2.8 rpg)
- Assists: 54 (0.7 apg)
- Stats at NBA.com
- Stats at Basketball Reference

Arthur Caleb Burris (April 7, 1924 – September 19, 1993) was an American basketball player.

He played collegiately for the University of Tennessee.

He was selected by the Fort Wayne Pistons in the third round of the 1950 NBA draft.

He played for the Pistons (1950–51) and Milwaukee Hawks (1951–52) in the National Basketball Association (NBA) for 74 games.

== Career statistics ==
Legend
GP	Games played	GS	Games started	MPG	Minutes per game
FG%	Field goal percentage	3P%	3-point field goal percentage	FT%	Free throw percentage
RPG	Rebounds per game	APG	Assists per game	SPG	Steals per game
BPG	Blocks per game	PPG	Points per game	**Bold**	Career high

=== NBA ===
==== Regular season ====
Year	Team	GP	MP	FG%	FT%	RPG	APG	PPG
1950–51	Fort Wayne	**33**		.248	.583	3.2	.8	2.3
1951–52	Fort Wayne	29	8.4	.240	.583	1.7	.4	1.5
1951–52	Milwaukee	12	**22.4**	**.296**	**.704**	**4.2**	**1.3**	**5.6**
Career		74	12.5	.260	.627	2.8	.7	2.5
