= Clint Wager =

American football and basketball player (1920–1996)

No. 51, 69
- Position: End

Personal information
- Born: January 20, 1920; Winona, Minnesota, U.S.
- Died: February 29, 1996 (aged 76); Excelsior, Minnesota, U.S.
- Listed height: 6 ft 6 in (1.98 m)
- Listed weight: 210 lb (95 kg)

Career information
- College: St. Mary's University

Career history
- 1942: Chicago Bears
- 1943: Chicago Cardinals
- 1944: "Card-Pitt"
- 1945: Chicago Cardinals
- Stats at Pro Football Reference

Other information
- Basketball career

Career information
- High school: Winona (Winona, Minnesota)
- College: St. Mary's (Minnesota) (1938–1942)
- Playing career: 1943–1951
- Position: Center / forward
- Number: 17

Career history
- 1943–1948: Oshkosh All-Stars
- 1948–1949: Hammond Calumet Buccaneers
- 1949–1950: Fort Wayne Pistons
- 1950–1951: Louisville Alumnites

Career highlights
- All-NBL First-team (1944)

Career NBA statistics
- Points: 143
- Games: 63
- Assists: 90
- Stats at NBA.com
- Stats at Basketball Reference

Clinton Belmar Wager (January 20, 1920 – February 29, 1996) was a professional football and basketball player. He played in the National Football League from 1942 to 1945 for the Chicago Bears, Chicago Cardinals and the Cardinals-Pittsburgh Steelers merged team, "Card-Pitt". However, he also played in the National Basketball Association in 1949–50 for the Fort Wayne Pistons (now called the Detroit Pistons). He also played in the National Basketball League for the Oshkosh All-Stars and Hammond Calumet Buccaneers, while finishing his career with the Louisville Alumnites of the National Professional Basketball League.

== College career ==
Prior to his professional career, Wager played basketball for Saint Mary's University. During his college career, he was an all-conference center and an individual scoring champion twice, in 1939 and 1940. He also participated in the 1941 National Invitational Tournament. He was also selected in his senior year as captain of the school's basketball team. He also played football for the school. He was elected in the schools sports hall of fame in 1977.

== Career statistics ==
=== NBA ===
==== Regular season ====
Year	Team	GP	FG%	FT%	APG	PPG
1949–50	Fort Wayne	63	.281	.617	1.4	2.3

==== Playoffs ====
Year	Team	GP	FG%	FT%	APG	PPG
1949–50	Fort Wayne	4	.440	.800	2.0	7.5
