= Boag Johnson =

American basketball player

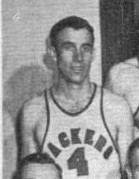
- Johnson, 1947

Personal information
- Born: December 6, 1921 Huntington, Indiana, U.S.
- Died: July 11, 2005 (aged 83) Cleveland, Ohio, U.S.
- Listed height: 5 ft 11 in (1.80 m)
- Listed weight: 170 lb (77 kg)

Career information
- High school: Union Center (Huntington County, Indiana)
- College: Huntington (1944–1947)
- BAA draft: 1947: undrafted
- Playing career: 1947–1953
- Position: Point guard
- Number: 4, 5
- Coaching career: 1953–1971

Career history

Playing
- 1947–1950: Anderson Packers
- 1950–1953: Fort Wayne Pistons

Coaching
- 1953–1957: Columbia City HS
- 1960–1971: Warsaw HS

Career highlights
- As player: NBL champion (1949); All-NBL Second Team (1949)
- Stats at NBA.com
- Stats at Basketball Reference

David Ralph "Boag" Johnson (December 6, 1921 – July 11, 2005) was an American professional basketball player. He played for the Anderson Packers between 1947 and 1950, then the Fort Wayne Pistons between 1950 and 1953.

== Career statistics ==
Legend
GP	Games played	GS	Games started	MPG	Minutes per game
FG%	Field goal percentage	3P%	3-point field goal percentage	FT%	Free throw percentage
RPG	Rebounds per game	APG	Assists per game	SPG	Steals per game
BPG	Blocks per game	PPG	Points per game	**Bold**	Career high

=== NBA ===
==== Regular season ====
Year	Team	GP	MPG	FG%	FT%	RPG	APG	PPG
1949–50	Anderson	35	–	.312	**.855**	–	3.0	**9.6**
1949–50	Fort Wayne	32	–	.312	.717	–	2.1	7.9
1950–51	Fort Wayne	**68**	–	.319	.704	**4.0**	2.7	8.6
1951–52	Fort Wayne	66*	**34.3**	**.356**	.721	3.4	**3.2**	7.9
1952–53	Fort Wayne	3	10.0	.333	.667	.3	1.7	2.7
Career		204	33.3	.327	.740	3.6	2.8	8.4

==== Playoffs ====
Year	Team	GP	MPG	FG%	FT%	RPG	APG	PPG
1950	Fort Wayne	**4**	–	.250	.750	–	2.0	7.0
1951	Fort Wayne	3	–	**.375**	.500	2.3	2.3	8.3
1952	Fort Wayne	2	**35.0**	.348	**1.000**	**3.0**	**3.5**	**8.5**
Career		9	35.0	.322	.737	2.6	2.4	7.8
