= John Oldham (basketball) =

American basketball player (1923–2020)

Personal information
- Born: June 22, 1923 Beaver Dam, Kentucky, U.S.
- Died: November 23, 2020 (aged 97) Bowling Green, Kentucky, U.S.
- Listed height: 6 ft 3 in (1.91 m)
- Listed weight: 175 lb (79 kg)

Career information
- High school: Hartford (Hartford, Kentucky)
- College: Western Kentucky (1942–1943, 1946–1949)
- BAA draft: 1949: 2nd round
- Drafted by: Fort Wayne Pistons
- Playing career: 1949–1951
- Position: Guard
- Number: 4

Career history
- 1949–1951: Fort Wayne Pistons

Career highlights
- Third-team All-American – UPI (1949); No. 42 jersey retired by Western Kentucky Hilltoppers

Career NBA statistics
- Points: 926 (7.3 ppg)
- Rebounds: 242 (3.6 rpg)
- Assists: 226 (1.8 apg)
- Stats at NBA.com
- Stats at Basketball Reference

John Oldham (June 22, 1923 – November 23, 2020) was an American college and professional basketball player, college coach and athletic director. Oldham interrupted his studies at Western Kentucky University (WKU) to serve in the US Navy during World War II. He was on the university's basketball team and after graduation in 1949 played for the Fort Wayne Pistons. Oldham went into coaching in 1952 at College High School in Bowling Green, Kentucky. In 1955 he became coach of the Tennessee Tech Golden Eagles men's basketball and led the team to three conference championships. He returned to WKU in 1964 to coach the Western Kentucky Hilltoppers basketball team, leading them to four NCAA tournaments, one NIT, and winning four Ohio Valley Conference (OVC) championships. In 1971 Oldham was promoted to athletic director at WKU, a position he held until 1986. During his tenure the university won six OVC and one Sun Belt Conference All-Sports Championship. After retirement he was elected to the Bowling Green City Commission.

== Career ==
Oldham came to Western Kentucky University in 1942 after earning All-State honors at Hartford High School. In 1943 he left college to serve in the United States Navy during World War II. He returned to the college in 1946, graduating in 1949. The teams he played on at Western were nationally ranked, participated in three National Invitation Tournaments, including a 3rd-place finish in 1948, won three KIAC titles, one SIAA championship, and the first Ohio Valley Conference title. He was a United Press and Associated Press All-American in 1949. After college, he played for the Fort Wayne Pistons of the National Basketball Association.

In 1952 he began his coaching career at College High School in Bowling Green, KY. In his first year as coach, he led the boys' basketball team to the state tournament.

Oldham was hired to coach Tennessee Tech Golden Eagles men's basketball in 1955. He led the school to three conference championships and its first two appearances in the NCAA tournament. Oldham returned to coach his alma mater, the Western Kentucky Hilltoppers, in 1964, taking over for his former coach Edgar Diddle who retired after 42 years at the school. In seven seasons, he finished 146–41 with a 78% winning percentage, leading them to four NCAA tournaments and an NIT berth while winning five Ohio Valley Conference championships. He led the Hilltoppers to the 1971 NCAA tournament to the Final Four and finished third overall. Their third-place finish was later vacated by the NCAA due to allegations that one of their players, Jim McDaniels, had signed a professional contract prior to the end of the season. He was named Ohio Valley Conference coach of the year four times.

In 1971 Oldham was named athletic director for WKU, and served in that position until his retirement in 1986. During his tenure as AD, WKU won six OVC All-Sports Championships and one Sun Belt Conference All-Sports Championship. He oversaw the football program upgrading from NCAA Division 2 to Division 1AA in 1978, the school leaving the OVC and joining the Sun Belt Conference in 1982, and the Western Kentucky Lady Toppers basketball team becoming one of the top programs in the country. He also hired the school's first African American Head Coach, Clem Haskins as men's basketball coach, in 1980. He has been inducted into the Lions Club Kentucky High School Hall of Fame (1969), Kentucky Athletic Hall of Fame (1986), Ohio Valley Conference Hall of Fame (1989), Kentucky High School Hall of Fame (1990), Tennessee Tech Sports Hall of Fame (1990) and WKU Athletic Hall of Fame (1991).

In 1991 Oldham was elected to the Bowling Green City Commission and was re-elected twice, serving as Commissioner through December 1998.

Oldham died at Bowling Green on November 23, 2020, at the age of 97. He was due to be buried in the city's Fairview Cemetery with military honours on November 30.

== Cultural impact ==
The 1971 Western Kentucky Hilltoppers NCAA Final-4 basketball team was the first non-historically black Kentucky collegiate basketball team to start five African-American players. Coach Oldham started Clarence Glover, Jim McDaniels, Jim Rose, Jerry Dunn and Rex Bailey. Oldham was pressured not to start all five together, but said "they are my best five players."

The concept of WKU's Red Towel athletics logo was developed by John Oldham in 1971, based on Ed Diddle's use of a red towel while coaching games.

In 1980 Oldham hired the first African-American head coach in school history, when he named Clem Haskins basketball coach.

On December 27, 2012, WKU honored Oldham in a pregame ceremony in which the court at EA Diddle Arena was named "John Oldham Court." Oldham was a player, basketball coach, and athletic director during his time at WKU.

== Career playing statistics ==
Legend
GP	Games played	GS	Games started	MPG	Minutes per game
FG%	Field goal percentage	3P%	3-point field goal percentage	FT%	Free throw percentage
RPG	Rebounds per game	APG	Assists per game	SPG	Steals per game
BPG	Blocks per game	PPG	Points per game	**Bold**	Career high

=== NBA ===
==== Regular season ====
Year	Team	GP	FG%	FT%	RPG	APG	PPG
1949–50	Fort Wayne	59	.298	**.710**	–	1.7	6.1
1950–51	Fort Wayne	**68**	**.333**	.586	**3.6**	**1.9**	**8.4**
Career		127	.319	.627	3.6	1.8	7.3

==== Playoffs ====
Year	Team	GP	FG%	FT%	RPG	APG	PPG
1950	Fort Wayne	**4**	**.444**	**.765**	–	1.0	**9.3**
1951	Fort Wayne	3	.375	.500	**1.7**	**1.7**	5.7
Career		7	.419	.667	1.7	1.3	7.7

== Head coaching record ==
Record table
Season	Team	Overall	Conference	Standing	Postseason
**Tennessee Tech Golden Eagles** (Ohio Valley Conference) (1955–1964)
1955–56	Tennessee Tech	14–7	7–3	T–1st	
1956–57	Tennessee Tech	9–11	1–9	6th	
1957–58	Tennessee Tech	17–9	8–2	1st	NCAA University Division First Round
1958–59	Tennessee Tech	16–9	7–5	3rd	
1959–60	Tennessee Tech	13–9	7–4	3rd	
1960–61	Tennessee Tech	6–13	3–9	6th	
1961–62	Tennessee Tech	16–6	7–5	T–2nd	
1962–63	Tennessee Tech	16–8	8–4	T–1st	NCAA University Division First Round
1963–64	Tennessee Tech	11–11	7–7	T–4th	
Tennessee Tech:		118–83 (.587)	55–48 (.534)		
**Western Kentucky Hilltoppers** (Ohio Valley Conference) (1964–1971)
1964–65	Western Kentucky	18–9	10–4	2nd	NIT Second Round
1965–66	Western Kentucky	25–3	14–0	1st	NCAA University Division Regional Third Place
1966–67	Western Kentucky	23–3	13–1	1st	NCAA University Division First Round
1967–68	Western Kentucky	18–7	9–5	3rd	
1968–69	Western Kentucky	16–10	9–5	3rd	
1969–70	Western Kentucky	22–3	14–0	1st	NCAA University Division First Round
1970–71	Western Kentucky	24–6	12–2	1st	NCAA University Division Third Place*
Western Kentucky:		146–41 (.781)	81–17 (.827)		
Total:		264–124 (.680)			
National champion Postseason invitational champion Conference regular season champion Conference regular season and conference tournament champion Division regular season champion Division regular season and conference tournament champion Conference tournament champion

* 1971 NCAA Tournament participation later vacated by the NCAA

== See also ==
- List of NCAA Division I Men's Final Four appearances by coach
