= Bob Harris (basketball) =

American basketball player

Personal information
- Born: March 16, 1927 Linden, Tennessee, U.S.
- Died: April 10, 1977 (aged 50) Tupelo, Mississippi, U.S.
- Listed height: 6 ft 7 in (2.01 m)
- Listed weight: 195 lb (88 kg)

Career information
- High school: Battle Ground Academy (Franklin, Tennessee)
- College: Murray State (1944–1945); Oklahoma State (1946–1949)
- BAA draft: 1949: 1st round, 3rd overall pick
- Drafted by: Fort Wayne Pistons
- Playing career: 1949–1954
- Position: Power forward / center
- Number: 14, 9, 18, 13

Career history
- 1949–1950: Fort Wayne Pistons
- 1950–1954: Boston Celtics

Career highlights
- Second-team All-American – AP, UPI (1949); First-team All-MVC (1949)

Career NBA statistics
- Points: 2,209 (6.8 per game)
- Rebound: 1,824 (6.9 per game)
- Assists: 502 (1.5 per game)
- Stats at NBA.com
- Stats at Basketball Reference

Robert Anderson Harris (March 16, 1927 – April 10, 1977) was a National Basketball Association (NBA) player.

Harris played for the Murray State College Racers during the 1944–45 season. He played for the Cowboys at Oklahoma Agricultural and Mechanical College from 1946 to 1949. In his senior season, Harris was selected to the NCAA AP All-American second team. Harris was drafted with the third overall pick in the 1949 BAA Draft by the Fort Wayne Pistons. On December 19, 1950, Harris was traded to the Boston Celtics for Dick Mehen. On October 16, 1954, Harris was traded back to the Pistons for Fred Scolari, but he never had any play time for the remainder of games for the Pistons. In his NBA career, Harris averaged 6.8 points and 6.9 rebounds per game.

After retiring from the NBA, he moved to Jackson, Mississippi, where he worked in an area chicken production plant. He died from lung cancer at the age of 50.

== Career statistics ==
Legend
GP	Games played	GS	Games started	MPG	Minutes per game
FG%	Field goal percentage	3P%	3-point field goal percentage	FT%	Free throw percentage
RPG	Rebounds per game	APG	Assists per game	SPG	Steals per game
BPG	Blocks per game	PPG	Points per game	**Bold**	Career high
*	Led the league

=== NBA ===
==== Regular season ====
Year	Team	GP	MPG	FG%	FT%	RPG	APG	PPG
1949–50	Fort Wayne	62	–	.361	.628	–	**2.1**	7.7
1950–51	Fort Wayne	12	–	.228	**.750**	3.7	.7	3.4
1950–51	Boston	44	–	.357	.664	5.6	1.3	5.5
1951–52	Boston	66*	**28.8**	.410	.641	**8.0**	1.8	**7.8**
1952–53	Boston	70	28.2	**.418**	.588	6.9	1.4	7.4
1953–54	Boston	**71**	26.7	.381	.628	7.3	1.3	5.9
Career		325	27.9	.385	.628	6.9	1.5	6.8

==== Playoffs ====
Year	Team	GP	MPG	FG%	FT%	RPG	APG	PPG
1950	Fort Wayne	4	–	.281	.600	–	**2.8**	7.5
1951	Boston	2	–	.100	.714	2.0	1.0	3.5
1952	Boston	3	29.0	.429	**1.000**	8.3	1.3	7.7
1953	Boston	**6**	**32.2**	.452	.750	**9.3**	2.0	**8.3**
1954	Boston	**6**	25.0	**.640**	.696	5.8	.5	8.0
Career		21	28.7	.415	.709	7.1	1.5	7.5
