= Jack Kerris =

American basketball player

Personal information
- Born: January 30, 1925
- Died: December 4, 1983 (aged 58)
- Listed height: 6 ft 6 in (1.98 m)
- Listed weight: 215 lb (98 kg)

Career information
- High school: De La Salle Institute (Chicago, Illinois)
- College: Loyola Chicago (1945–1949)
- BAA draft: 1949: 1st round, 9th overall pick
- Drafted by: Chicago Stags
- Playing career: 1949–1953
- Position: Power forward
- Number: 12, 15, 12

Career history
- 1949: Tri-Cities Blackhawks
- 1949–1953: Fort Wayne Pistons
- 1953: Baltimore Bullets

Career NBA statistics
- Points: 2,057 (7.6 ppg)
- Rebounds: 1,286 (6.3 rpg)
- Assists: 667 (2.5 apg)
- Stats at NBA.com
- Stats at Basketball Reference

John Edward Kerris (January 30, 1925 – December 4, 1983) was an American professional basketball player. Kerris played college basketball for Loyola of Chicago and was the ninth overall pick in the 1949 BAA draft by the Chicago Stags. He played for the Tri-Cities Blackhawks, Fort Wayne Pistons and Baltimore Bullets in his four-year career.

== Career statistics ==
Legend
GP	Games played	GS	Games started	MPG	Minutes per game
FG%	Field goal percentage	3P%	3-point field goal percentage	FT%	Free throw percentage
RPG	Rebounds per game	APG	Assists per game	SPG	Steals per game
BPG	Blocks per game	PPG	Points per game	**Bold**	Career high

=== NBA ===
==== Regular season ====
Year	Team	GP	MPG	FG%	FT%	RPG	APG	PPG
1949–50	Tri-Cities	4	–	.308	**.833**	–	2.0	6.5
1949–50	Fort Wayne	64	–	.327	.641	–	1.7	7.1
1950–51	Fort Wayne	**68**	–	.370	.681	7.0	2.7	**10.5**
1951–52	Fort Wayne	66*	**32.5**	.388	.668	**7.8**	**3.2**	8.9
1952–53	Fort Wayne	52	18.9	.330	.616	4.0	2.1	3.4
1952–53	Baltimore	17	26.0	**.442**	.659	5.2	2.8	5.6
Career		271	26.5	.363	.662	6.3	2.5	7.6

==== Playoffs ====
Year	Team	GP	MPG	FG%	FT%	RPG	APG	PPG
1950	Fort Wayne	**4**	–	**.400**	.591	–	1.3	9.3
1951	Fort Wayne	3	–	.346	.500	6.7	3.3	7.7
1952	Fort Wayne	2	**31.5**	.350	.550	**9.0**	**4.5**	**12.5**
1953	Baltimore	2	15.5	.200	**1.000**	1.0	.5	3.5
Career		11	23.5	.349	.582	5.7	2.2	8.4
