= Fred Schaus =

American basketball player and coach, college athletics administrator (1925–2010)

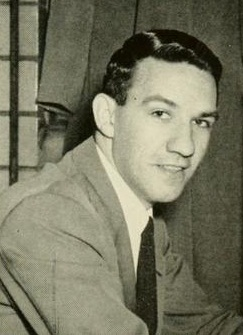
- Schaus from The Monticola, 1955

Personal information
- Born: June 30, 1925 Newark, Ohio, U.S.
- Died: February 10, 2010 (aged 84) Morgantown, West Virginia, U.S.
- Listed height: 6 ft 5 in (1.96 m)
- Listed weight: 205 lb (93 kg)

Career information
- High school: Newark (Newark, Ohio)
- College: West Virginia (1946–1949)
- NBA draft: 1949: 3rd round
- Drafted by: Fort Wayne Pistons
- Playing career: 1949–1954
- Position: Small forward
- Number: 8, 17
- Coaching career: 1954–1978

Career history

Playing
- 1949–1953: Fort Wayne Pistons
- 1953–1954: New York Knicks

Coaching
- 1954–1960: West Virginia
- 1960–1967: Los Angeles Lakers
- 1972–1978: Purdue

Career highlights
- As player: NBA All-Star (1951); All-NBA Second Team (1950); As coach: 5× NBA All-Star Game head coach (1962–1964, 1966, 1967); NIT championship (1974); 4× SoCon Coach of the Year (1955, 1958–1960); As executive: NBA champion (1972)

Career NBA statistics
- Points: 4,070 (12.2 ppg)
- Rebounds: 1,609 (6.0 rpg)
- Assists: 961 (2.9 apg)
- Stats at NBA.com
- Stats at Basketball Reference
Medals
Men's basketball
Representing United States
Pan American Games
Gold medal – first place	1959 Chicago	Team competition

Frederick Appleton Schaus (June 30, 1925 – February 10, 2010) was an American basketball player, head coach and athletic director for the West Virginia University Mountaineers, player for the National Basketball Association's Fort Wayne Pistons and New York Knicks, general manager and head coach for the Los Angeles Lakers, head coach of Purdue University basketball, and a member of the NCAA Basketball Committee. He was born in Newark, Ohio.

== College career ==
Schaus was recruited from out of state (Ohio) by the legendary coach Lee Patton in 1946 to play at West Virginia University. Under Patton, Fred developed into a top star among stars during that golden age of Mountaineer basketball. Among Schaus' many accomplishments was that he was the first to score 1,000 career points (1,009) at WVU. He was also selected to the All-American team in 1949.

== Professional career ==
Schaus left West Virginia to join the Fort Wayne Pistons in the 1949–1950 season. He scored 14.3 points a game and a year later scored a career-best 15.3 points a game. He was selected to play in the first NBA All-Star Game and scored eight points for the West. However, he only averaged 14.1 points per game in 1952, and then in 1953 it dropped to 10.1 points per game.

He was traded to the New York Knicks halfway through the 1954 season and ended his NBA career that season with 7.1 points per game average.

== NBA career statistics ==
Legend
GP	Games played	GS	Games started	MPG	Minutes per game
FG%	Field goal percentage	3P%	3-point field goal percentage	FT%	Free throw percentage
RPG	Rebounds per game	APG	Assists per game	SPG	Steals per game
BPG	Blocks per game	PPG	Points per game	**Bold**	Career high

=== Regular season ===
Year	Team	GP	MPG	FG%	FT%	RPG	APG	PPG
1949–50	Fort Wayne	68	–	.352	.818	–	2.6	14.3
1950–51	Fort Wayne	68	–	.340	**.835**	**7.3**	2.7	**15.1**
1951–52	Fort Wayne	62	**41.6**	.361	.833	7.0	**4.0**	14.1
1952–53	Fort Wayne	**69**	36.8	.334	.821	6.0	3.6	10.5
1953–54	Fort Wayne	23	11.8	**.397**	.760	2.2	.9	3.8
1953–54	New York	44	28.3	.386	.793	4.9	2.0	8.8
Career		334	33.5	.352	.823	6.0	2.9	12.2

=== Playoffs ===
Year	Team	GP	MPG	FG%	FT%	RPG	APG	PPG
1950	Fort Wayne	4	–	.364	.839	–	2.8	**18.5**
1951	Fort Wayne	3	–	**.386**	.818	5.3	3.3	14.3
1952	Fort Wayne	2	**45.0**	.343	.875	**7.5**	**7.0**	15.5
1953	Fort Wayne	**8**	30.5	.300	.761	5.3	5.3	8.9
1954	New York	4	29.8	.280	**.933**	3.0	3.0	7.0
Career		21	32.4	.339	.820	5.0	2.6	11.8

== College coaching career ==
=== West Virginia ===
After his retirement from the NBA, Schaus returned to his alma mater to coach the Mountaineers. In his first season, he led the Mountaineers to a 19–11 mark and an NCAA tournament appearance. In the next five seasons, he posted an amazing 127–26 (.831) record, which included five consecutive NCAA tournament berths. The recruitment of Schaus for Jerry West (a native of Chelyan, West Virginia) to play for the Mountaineers was a key factor, with West calling Schaus his "mentor"; West played on the freshmen team in 1957 before playing with Schaus and the varsity team from 1958 to 1960. He led WVU to the NCAA finals in 1959, but lost to Pete Newell's California team, 71–70.

=== Purdue ===
After leaving NBA coaching and management in 1972, he returned to the college ranks to coach at Purdue University, taking over for George King. He held a 104–60 overall record as the Boilermaker's head coach, while leading them to the 1974 NIT Championship and a berth in the 1977 NCAA tournament. He then owned the distinction of being the only coach to reach the NIT finals, NCAA finals, and the NBA Finals.

At Purdue, Schaus was the successor to George King, who was Schaus' successor at West Virginia.

After 1981, Schaus returned to WVU to serve as the athletic director.

== Professional coaching/management career ==
=== Los Angeles Lakers ===
After the 1960 season, he left college coaching for the Los Angeles Lakers and reunited with his former WVU star, Jerry West. Schaus guided the Lakers to seven consecutive playoff appearances, including 4 Western Conference Championships in 5 years (1962, 1963, 1965 and 1966). He labeled the loss in 1966 (a Game 7 loss in Boston) as the “worst disappointment of my pro coaching career....If you don’t win it all, you’re nothing.” In 1967, he moved to the front office to become the Lakers general manager. He rebuilt the Lakers, eventually winning the 1972 NBA title. Not long after, Schaus was contacted by his friend George King (who had succeeded Schaus at West Virginia in 1960) about joining him at Purdue, as King wanted to focus on being the athletic director rather than being director and coach. Schaus accepted.

== Head coaching record ==
=== College ===
Record table
Season	Team	Overall	Conference	Standing	Postseason
West Virginia Mountaineers (Southern Conference) (1954–1960)
1954–55	West Virginia	19–11	9–1	1st	NCAA first round
1955–56	West Virginia	21–9	10–2	T–1st	NCAA first round
1956–57	West Virginia	25–5	12–0	1st	NCAA University Division First Round
1957–58	West Virginia	26–2	12–0	1st	NCAA University Division First Round
1958–59	West Virginia	29–5	11–0	1st	NCAA University Division Runner-up
1959–60	West Virginia	26–5	9–2	2nd	NCAA University Division Regional Third Place
West Virginia:		146–37 (.798)	63–5 (.926)		
Purdue Boilermakers (Big Ten Conference) (1972–1978)
1972–73	Purdue	15–9	8–6	T–3rd	
1973–74	Purdue	21–9	10–4	3rd	NIT Champion
1974–75	Purdue	17–11	11–7	T–3rd	NCIT Semifinals
1975–76	Purdue	16–11	11–7	3rd	
1976–77	Purdue	20–8	14–4	2nd	NCAA Division I First Round
1977–78	Purdue	16–11	11–7	T–4th	
Purdue:		104–60 (.634)	65–35 (.650)		
Total:		250 – 97 (.720)			
National champion Postseason invitational champion Conference regular season champion Conference regular season and conference tournament champion Division regular season champion Division regular season and conference tournament champion Conference tournament champion

=== Professional ===
Legend
Regular season	G	Games coached	W	Games won	L	Games lost	W–L %	Win–loss %
Playoffs	PG	Playoff games	PW	Playoff wins	PL	Playoff losses	PW–L %	Playoff win–loss %

Team	Year	G	W	L	W–L%	Finish	PG	PW	PL	PW–L%	Result
LAL	1960–61	79	36	43	.456	2nd in Western	12	6	6	.500	Lost in Western Div. Finals
LAL	1961–62	80	54	26	.675	1st in Western	13	7	6	.538	Lost in NBA Finals
LAL	1962–63	80	53	27	.663	1st in Western	13	6	7	.462	Lost in NBA Finals
LAL	1963–64	80	42	38	.525	3rd in Western	5	2	3	.400	Lost in Western Div. Semifinals
LAL	1964–65	80	49	31	.613	1st in Western	11	5	6	.455	Lost in NBA Finals
LAL	1965–66	80	45	35	.563	1st in Western	14	7	7	.500	Lost in NBA Finals
LAL	1966–67	81	36	45	.444	3rd in Western	3	0	3	.000	Lost in Western Div. Semifinals
Career		560	315	245	.563		71	33	38	.465	

== Personal life ==
He is the father of Southern Conference Commissioner and former Ohio University and Wichita State University athletic director Jim Schaus.

Schaus died in Morgantown, West Virginia, on February 10, 2010. He was 84.

== See also ==
- List of NCAA Division I Men's Final Four appearances by coach
