= Jim Riffey =

American basketball player (1923–2018)

Personal information
- Born: December 14, 1923 Washington, Indiana, U.S.
- Died: January 30, 2018 (aged 94) Battle Creek, Michigan, U.S.
- Listed height: 6 ft 4 in (1.93 m)
- Listed weight: 200 lb (91 kg)

Career information
- High school: Washington (Washington, Indiana)
- College: Tulane (1946–1950)
- NBA draft: 1950: 2nd round, 19th overall pick
- Drafted by: Fort Wayne Pistons
- Playing career: 1950–1951
- Position: Forward
- Number: 17, 9

Career history
- 1950–1951: Fort Wayne Pistons

Career highlights
- First-team All-SEC (1950); Second-team All-SEC (1949)

Career NBA statistics
- Points: 150 (4.3 ppg)
- Rebounds: 61 (1.7 rpg)
- Assists: 16 (0.5 apg)
- Stats at NBA.com
- Stats at Basketball Reference

James R. Riffey (December 14, 1923 – January 30, 2018) was an American professional basketball player. Riffey was selected in the second round (19th overall) of the 1950 NBA draft by the Fort Wayne Pistons after a collegiate career at Tulane. He played for the Pistons in 35 total games in 1950–51. He died in January 2018 at the age of 94.

== Career statistics ==
Legend
GP	Games played	GS	Games started	MPG	Minutes per game
FG%	Field goal percentage	3P%	3-point field goal percentage	FT%	Free throw percentage
RPG	Rebounds per game	APG	Assists per game	SPG	Steals per game
BPG	Blocks per game	PPG	Points per game	**Bold**	Career high

=== NBA ===
==== Regular season ====
Year	Team	GP	FG%	FT%	RPG	APG	PPG
1950–51	Fort Wayne	35	.351	.769	1.7	.5	4.3
