= Boston Celtics draft history =

In their 80-year history, the Boston Celtics have selected the following players in the National Basketball Association (NBA) draft and previously in the Basketball Association of America draft.

== Key ==
Naismith Basketball Hall of Famer	First overall NBA draft pick	NBA All-Star

Year	Rnd.	Pick	Name	Pos.	Nationality	From
1947	1	3	Bulbs Ehlers	G/F	United States	Purdue
1947	2	13	Hank Biasatti	G	Italy; Canada	Toronto Huskies (BAA)
1947	3	23	Gene Stump	G/F	United States	DePaul
1947	4	33	Johnny Ezersky	G/F	United States	Brooklyn Gothams (BAA)
1947	5	43	Jack Hewson	F/C	United States	Philadelphia Sphas (BAA)
1947	6		Bob Alameida	F	United States	California
1947	7		George Felt		United States	Northwestern
1947	8		John Kelly		United States	Notre Dame
1947	9		George Petrovick		United States	Bridgefort Newfields (ABL)
1948	1	3	George Hauptfuhrer	C	United States	Harvard
1948	2		Johnny Bach	G/F	United States	Fordham
1948	3		Marshall Hawkins	F	United States	Tennessee
1948	4		Tom Kelly	G	United States	NYU
1948	5		Murray Mitchell	C	United States	Sam Houston
1948	6		Norman Carey		United States	Oregon State
1948	7		Robert Curran	G	United States	Holy Cross
1948	8		Neil Dooley		United States	Colgate
1948	9		Jack Hauser		United States	Denver
1948	10		Guinn Phillips		United States	Texas Wesleyan
1948	11		Ray Wehde		United States	Iowa State
1949	1	4	Tony Lavelli	F	United States	Yale
1949	2	16	George Kaftan	F	United States	Boston Celtics (BAA)
1949	3		Joe Mullaney	G	United States	Holy Cross
1949	3		Bill Tom	C	United States	Rice
1949	4		Ed Little		United States	Denver
1949	5		Jim Simpson		United States	Bates
1949	6		Bill Vandenburgh		United States	Washington
1949	7		Emerson Speicher		United States	Bowling Green
1949	8		Duane Klueh	G	United States	Indiana State
1949	9		Bill Weight		United States	BYU
1949	10		Russ Washburn		United States	Colby
1950	1	1	Chuck Share	C	United States	Bowling Green
1950	2	12	Chuck Cooper	F	United States	Duquesne
1950	3	24	Bob Donham	G/F	United States	Ohio State
1950	4	36	Ken Reeves	G	United States	Louisville
1950	5	48	Jack Shelton	C	United States	Oklahoma State
1950	6	60	Mo Mahoney	F	United States	Brown
1950	7	72	Dale Barnstable	G	United States	Kentucky
1950	8	84	Frank Oftring	G	United States	Holy Cross
1950	9	98	Bob Cope	F	United States	Montana
1950	10	108	Matt Forman	C	United States	Holy Cross
1951	1	7	Ernie Barrett	G/F	United States	Kansas State
1951	2	16	Bill Garrett	F	United States	Indiana
1951	3	26	John Furlong	F	United States	Pepperdine
1951	4	36	Bob Barnett	G	United States	Evansville
1951	5	46	Rip Gish	C	United States	Western Kentucky
1951	6	56	Jim Luisi	G	United States	St. Francis
1951	7	66	John Azary	G	United States	Columbia
1951	8	75	Hugo Kappler	G	United States	NC State
1952	1	6	Bill Stauffer	F	United States	Missouri
1952	2		Jim Iverson	G	United States	Kansas State
1952	3		J.C. Maze	F	United States	Southwest Texas State
1952	4		Herm Hedderick	G	United States	Canisius
1952	5		Don Johnson	G	United States	Oklahoma State
1952	6		Jim Buchanan		United States	Nebraska
1952	7		Fred Eydt	F	United States	Cornell
1952	8		Gordon Mungier	F	United States	Spring Hill
1952	9		Jim Dilling	F	United States	Holy Cross
1952	10		Gene Conley	F/C	United States	Washington State
1953	1	5	Frank Ramsey	G/F	United States	Kentucky
1953	2	12	Chet Noe	F/C	United States	Oregon
1953	3	21	Cliff Hagan	G/F	United States	Kentucky
1953	4		Earle Markey	G	United States	Holy Cross
1953	5		John Holup	F	United States	George Washington
1953	6		Vernon Stokes	G	United States	St. Francis
1953	7	58	Lou Tsioropoulos	F	Greece; United States	Kentucky
1953	8		Ted Lallier	C	United States	Colby
1953	9		Lewis Gilcrease	G	United States	Texas State
1953	10		Tom Lillis	G	United States	Saint Louis
1953	11		Gil Reich	G	United States	Kansas
1953	12		Jim Doherty	G	United States	Whitworth
1954	1	5	Togo Palazzi	G/F	United States	Holy Cross
1954	2	14	Red Morrison	F/C	United States	Idaho
1954	3	23	Henry Daubenschmidt	C	United States	St. Francis
1954	4	32	Ron Perry	G	United States	Holy Cross
1954	5	41	Troy Burris	F	United States	West Texas A&M
1954	6	50	Otto Krieghauser	F	United States	Washington University
1954	7	59	Paul Estergaard	F	United States	Bradley
1954	8	68	Jim Young	G	United States	Santa Clara
1954	10	85	Tony Daukas	F	United States	Boston College
1954	11	94	Bill Johnson	F	United States	Nebraska
1955	1	3	Jim Loscutoff	F	United States	Oregon
1955	2	10	Dickie Hemric	F	United States	Wake Forest
1955	3	18	Buzzy Wilkinson	G	United States	Virginia
1955	4	26	Bart Leach	F	United States	Penn
1955	5	34	Bob Patterson	F	United States	Tulsa
1955	6	42	John Mahoney	F	United States	William & Mary
1955	7	50	John Moore	F	United States	UCLA
1955	8	58	Dean Parsons	C	United States	Washington
1955	9	66	Nick Romanoff	F	United States	Pacific
1955	10	74	Jim Ahearn	G	United States	UConn
1955	11	81	Carl Hartman	G	United States	Alderson Broaddus
1955	12	88	Mark Davis	G	United States	Marietta
1955	13	92	Henry Dooley	G	United States	Wiley
1955	14	93	Bob Scuddelari	G	United States	Cooper Union
1956	T	—	Tom Heinsohn	F/C	United States	Holy Cross
1956	2	13	K. C. Jones	G	United States	San Francisco
1956	3	21	George Linn	G	United States	Alabama
1956	4	29	Dan Swartz	F	United States	Morehead
1956	5	37	Bill Logan	C	United States	Iowa
1956	6	45	Don Boldebuck	C	United States	Houston
1956	7	53	O'Neal Weaver	F	United States	Midwestern State
1956	8	61	Vic Molodet	G	United States	NC State
1956	9	68	Jim Houston	F	United States	Brandeis
1956	10	75	Theophileus Lloyd	F	United States	Maryland
1957	1	8	Sam Jones	G/F	United States	North Carolina Central
1957	2	16	Dick O'Neal	F	United States	TCU
1957	3	24	Chuck Schramm	F	United States	Western Illinois
1957	4	32	Jim Ashmore	G	United States	Mississippi State
1957	5	40	Grady Wallace	F	United States	South Carolina
1957	6	48	Maury King	PG	United States	Kansas
1957	7	55	Dick Brott	C	United States	Denver
1957	8	62	Bill Von Weyhe	G	United States	Rhode Island
1957	9	69	Joe Gibbon	F	United States	Ole Miss
1957	10	75	Jack Butcher	G	United States	Memphis
1957	11	78	Dick Neal	F	United States	Indiana
1958	1	7	Bennie Swain	F	United States	Texas Southern
1958	2	15	Jimmy Smith	F	United States	Franciscan
1958	3	23	Jim Cunningham	G	United States	Fordham
1958	4	31	Dom Flora	G	United States	Washington and Lee
1958	5	39	Gene Brown	G	United States	San Francisco
1958	6	47	Dave Keleher	F	United States	Morehead State
1958	7	55	Rudy Fenderson	G	United States	Brandeis
1959	1	6	John Richter	F	United States	NC State
1959	2	14	Gene Guarilia	F	United States	George Washington
1959	3	22	Ralph Croswaite	C	United States	Western Kentucky
1959	4	30	Ed Kazakavich	F	United States	Scranton
1959	5	38	Roy Lange	F	United States	William & Mary
1959	6	46	Bob Cumings	F	United States	Boston University
1960	1	8	Tom Sanders	F	United States	NYU
1960	2	16	Leroy Wright	F	United States	Pacific
1960	3	24	Mike Graney	F	United States	Notre Dame
1960	4	32	Sid Cohen	G	United States	Kentucky
1960	5	40	Wayne Lawrence	F	United States	Texas A&M
1960	6	48	George Newman	F	United States	Kentucky
1961	1	9	Gary Phillips	G	United States	Houston
1961	2	17	Al Butler	G	United States	Niagara
1961	3	31	Bill Depp	F	United States	Vanderbilt
1961	4	40	Carl Cole	G	United States	Eastern Kentucky
1961	5	49	Bob DiStefano	C	United States	NC State
1961	6	58	Ned Twyman	G	United States	Duquesne
1961	7	67	Mel Klein	F	United States	Northern State
1962	1	7	John Havlicek	G/F	United States	Ohio State
1962	2	16	Jack Foley	F	United States	Holy Cross
1962	3	25	Jim Hadnot	C	United States	Providence
1962	4	34	Roger Strickland	F	United States	Jacksonville
1962	5	43	Gary Daniels	F	United States	The Citadel
1962	6	52	Jim Hooley	F	United States	Boston College
1962	7	60	Clyde Arnold	F	United States	Duquesne
1962	8	69	Chuck Chevalier	G	United States	Boston College
1962	9	78	Mike Cingiser	G	United States	Brown
1963	1	8	Bill Green	F	United States	Colorado State
1963	3	26	Chuck Kriston	G	United States	Valparaiso
1963	4	35	Connie McGuire	F	United States	Southeastern Oklahoma State
1963	5	44	Red Stroud	G	United States	Mississippi State
1963	6	53	Vinnie Ernst	G	United States	Providence
1963	7	62	Herb Magee	G	United States	Philadelphia Textile
1964	1	7	Mel Counts	F/C	United States	Oregon State
1964	2	16	Ron Bonham	F	United States	Cincinnati
1964	3	25	John Thompson	F	United States	Providence
1964	4	34	Joe Strawder	C	United States	Bradley
1964	5	43	Nick Werkman	G	United States	Seton Hall
1964	6	52	Levern Tart	G	United States	Bradley
1964	7	61	Rich Falk	G	United States	Northwestern
1964	8	70	Jeff Blue	C	United States	Butler
1964	9	77	Charles Kelley	G	United States	West Virginia Tech
1964	10	84	Duane Corribeau	G	United States	Clark
1965	1	8	Ollie Johnson	C	United States	San Francisco
1965	2	17	Ron Watts	F	United States	Wake Forest
1965	3	26	Toby Kimball	F/C	United States	UConn
1965	4	35	Richie Tarrant	G	United States	Saint Michael's
1965	5	44	Don Davidson	F	United States	Davidson
1965	6	53	Haskell Tison	C	United States	Duke
1965	7	61	George Deehan	F	United States	Lenoir–Rhyne
1966	1	8	Jim Barnett	G/F	United States	Oregon
1966	2	18	Leon Clark	F	United States	Wyoming
1966	3	28	Gary Turner	F	United States	TCU
1966	4	38	Johnny Austin	G	United States	Boston College
1966	6	58	Charlie Hunter	G	United States	Oklahoma City
1966	7	67	Jerry Ward	F	United States	Maryland
1966	8	76	Russ Gumina	G	United States	San Francisco
1967	1	11	Mal Graham	G	United States	NYU
1967	4	40	Nevil Shed	F	United States	UTEP
1967	5	52	Mike Redd	G	United States	US Armed Forces (AAU)
1967	6	64	Ed Hummer	F	United States	Princeton
1967	7	76	Edgar Lacy	F	United States	Allentown Jets (EPBL)
1967	8	88	Andrew Anderson	G	United States	Canisius
1967	9	99	Henry Brown	F	United States	Lowell Tech
1967	10	110	Rick Weitzman	G	United States	Northeastern
1967	11	120	Joe Harrington	F	United States	Maryland
1968	1	12	Don Chaney	G	United States	Houston
1968	3	32	Garfield Smith	F/C	United States	Eastern Kentucky
1968	4	46	Rich Johnson	C	United States	Grambling State
1968	5	60	Thad Jaracz	F	United States	Kentucky
1968	6	74	Jerry Newsom	F	United States	Indiana State
1968	7	88	Mike Lewis	C	United States	Duke
1968	8	102	Julius Keye	F/C	United States	Alcorn State
1968	9	116	Bill Butler	G	United States	St. Bonaventure
1968	10	130	Ivan Leschinsky	F	United States	LIU
1968	11	143	Tom Neimeir	F	United States	Evansville
1968	12	156	Bill Langheld	F	United States	Fordham
1968	13	168	Art Stephenson	F	United States	Rhode Island
1968	14	179	Keith Hockstein	G	United States	Holy Cross
1969	1	9	Jo Jo White	G	United States	Kansas
1969	3	38	Julius Keye	F/C	United States	Alcorn State
1969	4	52	Steve Kuberski	F/C	United States	Bradley
1969	5	66	George Thompson	G	United States	Marquette
1969	6	80	Dolph Pulliam	F	United States	Drake
1969	7	94	Jim Johnson	F	United States	Wisconsin
1969	8	108	Bob Whitmore	F	United States	Notre Dame
1969	9	122	Gordon Smith	G	United States	Cincinnati
1969	10	136	Jim Picka	C	United States	High Point
1969	11	150	Larry Frinston	C	United States	Kenyon
1969	12	163	Rod Forbes	F	United States	Boston State
1969	13	175	Billy Evans	G	United States	Boston College
1970	1	4	Dave Cowens	F/C	United States	Florida State
1970	2	21	Rex Morgan	G	United States	Jacksonville
1970	3	38	Willie Williams	F	United States	Florida State
1970	4	55	Jon McKinney	F	United States	Norfolk State
1970	5	72	Tom Carter	F	United States	Paul Quinn
1970	6	89	Rod McIntyre	F	United States	Jacksonville
1970	7	106	Charlie Scott	G/F	United States	North Carolina
1970	8	123	Bobby Croft	C	Canada	Tennessee
1970	9	140	Tom Little	G	United States	Seattle
1970	10	157	Mike Maloy	F	United States	Davidson
1971	1	10	Clarence Glover	F	United States	Western Kentucky
1971	2	28	Jim Rose	G	United States	Western Kentucky
1971	3	44	Dave Robisch	F/C	United States	Kansas
1971	4	61	Randy Denton	C	United States	Duke
1971	6	95	Thorpe Weber	F	United States	Vanderbilt
1971	7	112	Skip Young	G	United States	Florida State
1971	8	129	John Ribock	F	United States	South Carolina
1971	9	145	Ray Green	G	United States	California
1971	10	161	Dale Dover	G	United States	Harvard
1971	11	176	Reggie Brooks	F	United States	Southern New Hampshire
1971	12	189	John Dalton	G	United States	Suffolk
1971	13	201	Leroy Chalk	F	United States	Nebraska
1972	1	10	Paul Westphal	G	United States	USC
1972	2	27	Dennis Wuycik	F	United States	North Carolina
1972	3	44	Wayne Grabiec	G	United States	Michigan
1972	4	61	Nate Stephens	C	United States	Long Beach State
1972	5	77	Bryan Adrian	G	United States	Davidson
1972	6	94	Doug Holcomb	C	United States	Memphis
1972	6	96	Wally Wright	G	United States	Widener
1972	7	111	Stephen Previs	G	United States	North Carolina
1972	8	127	Sam McCarney	F	United States	Oral Roberts
1972	10	154	Marty Hunt	G	United States	Kenyon
1972	11	165	Mark Minor	F	United States	Ohio State
1972	12	173	Phil Stephens	F	United States	South Carolina
1973	1	17	Steve Downing	C	United States	Indiana
1973	2	35	Phil Hankinson	F	United States	Penn
1973	3	52	Martinez Denmon	G	United States	Iowa State
1973	4	69	Richie Fuqua	G	United States	Oral Roberts
1973	5	86	Byron Jones	F	United States	San Francisco
1973	6	103	Joe Cafferky	G	United States	NC State
1973	7	120	Mike Stewart	C	United States	Santa Clara
1973	8	137	Robert White	F	United States	Sam Houston
1973	9	151	Corky Taylor	F	United States	Minnesota
1973	10	165	Steve Turner	C	United States	Vanderbilt
1973	11	174	Ed Hastings	G	United States	Villanova
1973	12	182	Bruce Winkler	F	United States	Santa Clara
1973	13	188	Scott Koelzer	F	United States	Montana State
1973	14	193	Rick Williams	G	United States	Iowa
1973	15	198	James Gilchrist	F	United States	Florida Southern
1973	16	202	Sam Barber	F	United States	Bethune-Cookman
1973	17	206	Lamont King	G	United States	Long Beach State
1973	18	208	Peter Gavitt	F	United States	Maine
1973	19	210	Tom Austin	F	United States	UMass
1974	1	17	Glenn McDonald	G/F	United States	Long Beach State
1974	2	35	Kevin Stacom	G	United States	Providence
1974	3	53	Roscoe Pondexter	F	United States	Long Beach State
1974	4	71	Lerman Battle	F	United States	Fairmont State
1974	5	89	Ben Clyde	F	United States	Florida State
1974	6	107	Gene Harmon	F	United States	Creighton
1974	7	125	Ron Brown	G	United States	Penn State
1974	8	143	Richard Wallace	G	United States	Georgia Southern
1974	9	160	Al Skinner	G	United States	UMass
1974	10	177	Phil Rogers	F	United States	Fairfield
1975	1	17	Tom Boswell	F/C	United States	South Carolina
1975	3	53	Jerome Anderson	G	United States	West Virginia
1975	4	72	Cyrus Mann	C	United States	Illinois State
1975	5	89	Darryl Brown	C	United States	Fordham
1975	6	108	Rick Coleman	G	United States	Jacksonville
1975	7	125	Al Boswell	G	United States	Oral Roberts
1975	8	144	Roger Morningstar	F	United States	Kansas
1975	9	159	Robert Rhodes	F	United States	Albany State
1975	10	174	Bill Endicott	G	United States	UMass
1976	1	16	Norm Cook	F	United States	Kansas
1976	3	51	Jerry Fort	G	United States	Nebraska
1976	4	67	Lewis Linder	G	United States	Kentucky State
1976	5	85	Louis McKinney	G	United States	Saint Louis
1976	6	103	Art Collins	G	United States	St. Thomas
1976	7	121	Ralph Drollinger	C	United States	UCLA
1976	8	139	John Clark	G	United States	Northeastern
1976	9	156	Bill Collins	F	United States	Boston College
1976	10	172	Otho Tucker	F	United States	Illinois
1977	1	12	Cedric Maxwell	F	United States	Charlotte
1977	3	56	Skip Brown	G	United States	Wake Forest
1977	4	78	Jeff Cummings	C	United States	Tulane
1977	5	100	Bill Langloh	G	United States	Virginia
1977	6	122	Roy Pace	G	United States	Rutgers–Camden
1977	7	142	Dave Kyle	F	United States	Cleveland State
1977	8	161	Tom Harris	G	United States	Bowling Green
1978	1	6	Larry Bird	F	United States	Indiana State
1978	1	8	Freeman Williams (from NO via LAL)	G/F	United States	Portland State
1978	2	30	Jeff Judkins (from NO)	G/F	United States	Utah
1978	3	50	Dana Skinner	G	United States	Merrimack
1978	4	72	David Stergakos (Note: Played as Dave Nelson while at Bloomfield.)	F	United States; Greece	Bloomfield
1978	5	94	Greg Tynes	G	United States	Seton Hall
1978	6	116	Dave Winey	F	United States	Minnesota
1978	7	137	Steve Balkun	F	United States	Fairfield
1978	8	156	Kim Fisher	G	United States	Fairfield
1978	9	173	Les Anderson	F	United States	George Washington
1978	10	188	Walter Harrigan	F	United States	Brandeis
1979	3	53	Wayne Kreklow (from Indiana)	G	United States	Drake
1979	3	61	Ernesto Malcolm	G	Panama	Briar Cliff
1979	4	68	Nick Galis	G	United States	Seton Hall
1979	5	90	Jimmy Allen	G	United States	New Haven
1979	6	110	Marvin Delph	G	United States	Athletes in Action
1979	7	130	Steve Castellan	F	United States	Virginia
1979	8	149	Glenn Sudhop	C	United States	NC State
1979	9	168	Kevin Sinnett	F	United States	Navy
1979	10	186	Alton Byrd	G	United States	Columbia
1980	1	3	Kevin McHale (from Golden State)	F/C	United States	Minnesota
1980	2	46	Arnette Hallman	F	United States	Purdue
1980	3	54	Ron Perry	G	United States	Holy Cross
1980	3	69	Don Newman	G	United States	Idaho
1980	4	92	Kevin Hamilton	G	United States	Iona
1980	5	115	Rufus Harris	G	United States	Maine
1980	6	138	Kenny Evans	G	United States	Norfolk State
1980	7	160	Les Hanson	F	United States	Virginia Tech
1980	8	179	Steve Wright	F	United States	Boston University
1980	9	199	Brian Jung	C	United States	Northwestern
1980	10	214	John Nolan	G	United States	Providence
1981	1	23	Charles Bradley	G	United States	Wyoming
1981	2	25	Tracy Jackson (from DET)	G/F	United States	Notre Dame
1981	2	31	Danny Ainge (from SD)	G/F	United States	BYU
1981	3	69	John Johnson	G	United Kingdom	Michigan
1981	4	91	Stanley Williams	F	United States	La Salle
1981	5	115	Glen Grunwald	F	United States	Indiana
1981	6	137	Steve Waite	F	United States	Iowa
1981	7	161	Tom Seaman	F	United States	Holy Cross
1981	8	182	George Morrow	F	United States	Creighton
1981	9	203	Greg McCray	F	United States	VCU
1981	10	222	Ken Matthews	G	United States	NC State
1982	1	23	Darren Tillis	C	United States	Cleveland State
1982	2	46	Tony Guy	G	United States	Kansas
1982	3	69	Perry Moss	PG	United States	Northeastern
1982	4	92	Greg Stewart	F	United States	Tulsa
1982	5	115	William Brown	G	United States	Saint Peter's
1982	6	138	John Schweitz	SG	United States	Richmond
1982	7	161	Phil Collins	C	United States	West Virginia
1982	8	184	Ed Spriggs	C	United States	Georgetown
1982	9	205	Panagiotis Giannakis	G	United States	Ionikos Nikaias B.C. (Greece)
1982	10	225	Landon Turner	F	United States	Indiana
1983	1	21	Greg Kite	C	United States	BYU
1983	3	52	Winfred King	G	United States	East Tennessee State
1983	3	68	Craig Robinson	F	United States	Virginia
1983	4	91	Carlos Clark	SG	United States	Ole Miss
1983	5	114	Bob Reitz	G	United States	Stonehill
1983	6	137	Paul Atkins	F	United States	Dallas Baptist
1983	7	160	Roy Jackson	G	United States	Providence
1983	8	183	Trent Johnson	F	United States	Pittsburgh
1983	9	205	John Rice	G	United States	UMass Boston
1983	10	226	Andy Kupec	G	United States	Bentley College
1984	1	24	Michael Young	G/F	United States	Houston
1984	2	47	Ronnie Williams	F	United States	Florida
1984	3	70	Rick Carlisle	G	United States	Virginia
1984	4	93	Kevin Mullin	F	United States	Princeton
1984	5	116	Todd Orlando	F	United States	Bentley College
1984	6	139	Steve Carfino	G	United States	Iowa
1984	7	162	Mark Van Valkenburg	F	United States	Framingham State
1984	8	184	Champ Godboldt	G	United States	Holy Cross
1984	9	206	Joe Dixon	F	United States	Merrimack
1984	10	228	Dan Trant	G	Ireland	Clark
1985	1	20	Sam Vincent (from DEN via DAL)	SG	United States	Michigan State
1985	3	70	Andre Battle	G	United States	Loyola
1985	4	93	Cliff Weber	F	United States	Liberty
1985	5	116	Albert Butts	C	United States	La Salle
1985	6	139	Ralph Lewis	SG	United States	La Salle
1985	7	162	Chris Remly	F	United States	Rutgers
1986	1	2	Len Bias (from SEA)	SF	United States	Maryland
1986	4	93	Tony Benford	G	United States	Texas Tech
1986	5	116	Dave Colbert	C	United States	Dayton
1986	6	139	Greg Wendt	F	United States	Detroit Mercy
1986	7	162	Tom Ivey	C	United States	Boston University
1987	1	22	Reggie Lewis	SG	United States	Northeastern
1987	2	45	Brad Lohaus	PF/C	United States	Iowa
1987	4	70	Tom Sheehey	C	United States	Virginia
1987	4	91	Darryl Kennedy	F	United States	Oklahoma
1987	5	114	Dave Butler	F	United States	California
1987	6	137	Tim Naegeli	F	United States	Wisconsin–Stevens Point
1987	7	160	Jerry Corcoran	C	United States	Northeastern
1988	1	24	Brian Shaw	SG	United States	UC Santa Barbara
1988	3	74	Gerald Paddio	F/G	United States	UNLV
1989	1	13	Michael Smith	PF	United States	BYU
1989	2	40	Dino Rađa	PF	Yugoslavia	KK Split (Yugoslavia)
1990	1	19	Dee Brown	SG	United States	Jacksonville
1991	1	24	Rick Fox	SF	Canada	North Carolina
1992	1	21	Jon Barry	SG	United States	Georgia Tech
1992	2	47	Darren Morningstar	C	United States	Pittsburgh
1993	1	19	Acie Earl	C	United States	Iowa
1994	1	9	Eric Montross	C	United States	North Carolina
1994	2	36	Andrei Fetisov	F	United States	Forum Valladolid (Spain)
1995	1	14	Eric Williams	SF	United States	Providence
1995	2	33	Junior Burrough	F	United States	Virginia
1996	1	6	Antoine Walker	F	United States	Kentucky
1996	2	38	Steve Hamer	C	United States	Tennessee
1997	1	3	Chauncey Billups	PG	United States	Colorado
1997	1	6	Ron Mercer (from DAL)	SF	United States	Kentucky
1997	2	56	Ben Pepper (from MIA)	C	Australia	Newcastle Falcons (Australia)
1998	1	10	Paul Pierce	SF/SG	United States	Kansas
1999	2	55	Kris Clack (from ORL via DEN)	G	United States	Texas
2000	1	11	Jérôme Moïso	PF	France	UCLA
2001	1	10	Joe Johnson	SG	United States	Arkansas
2001	1	11	Kedrick Brown (from DEN)	SF	United States	Okaloosa-Walton
2001	1	21	Joseph Forte (from PHX via DEN and UTA)	SG	United States	North Carolina
2002	2	49	Darius Songaila	PF	Lithuania	Wake Forest
2003	1	16	Troy Bell (traded to MEM)	PG	United States	Boston College
2003	1	20	Dahntay Jones (from PHI, traded to MEM)	SG	United States	Duke
2003	2	56	Brandon Hunter (from SAC)	PF	United States	Ohio
2004	1	15	Al Jefferson	PF/C	United States	Prentiss HS
2004	1	24	Delonte West (from DAL)	PG	United States	Saint Joseph's
2004	1	25	Tony Allen (from DET)	SG	United States	Oklahoma State
2004	2	40	Justin Reed	SF	United States	Mississippi
2005	1	18	Gerald Green	G/F	United States	Gulf Shores Academy
2005	2	50	Ryan Gomes	F	United States	Providence
2005	2	53	Orien Greene (from SAC)	G	United States	Louisiana–Lafayette
2006	1	7	Randy Foye (traded to MIN via POR)	SG	United States	Villanova
2007	1	5	Jeff Green (traded to SEA)	SF	United States	Georgetown
2007	2	32	Gabe Pruitt	PG	United States	USC
2008	1	30	J. R. Giddens	SG	United States	New Mexico
2008	2	60	Semih Erden	C	Turkey	Fenerbahçe Ülker (Turkey)
2009	2	58	Lester Hudson	PG	United States	Tennessee–Martin
2010	1	19	Avery Bradley	SG	United States	Texas
2010	2	52	Luke Harangody	PF	United States	Notre Dame
2011	1	25	MarShon Brooks (traded to NJ)	SG	United States	Providence
2011	2	55	E'Twaun Moore	SG	United States	Purdue
2012	1	21	Jared Sullinger	PF	United States	Ohio State
2012	1	22	Fab Melo (from LAC via OKC)	C	Brazil	Syracuse
2012	2	51	Kris Joseph	SF	Canada	Syracuse
2013	1	16	Lucas Nogueira (traded to ATL via DAL)	C	Brazil	CB Estudiantes (Spain)
2014	1	6	Marcus Smart	SG/PG	United States	Oklahoma State
2014	1	17	James Young (from BKN)	SG/SF	United States	Kentucky
2015	1	16	Terry Rozier	PG	United States	Louisville
2015	1	28	R. J. Hunter (from LAC)	SG	United States	Georgia State
2015	2	33	Jordan Mickey (from PHI via MIA)	PF	United States	LSU
2015	2	45	Marcus Thornton	PG	United States	William & Mary
2016	1	3	Jaylen Brown (from BKN)	SF/SG	United States	California
2016	1	16	Guerschon Yabusele (from DAL)	PF	France	Rouen Métropole Basket (France)
2016	1	23	Ante Žižić	C	Croatia	Cibona Zagreb (Croatia)
2016	2	31	Deyonta Davis (from PHI via MIA, traded to MEM)	PF/C	United States	Michigan State
2016	2	35	Rade Zagorac (from MIN via NO via PHX, traded to MEM)	SG/SF	Serbia	Mega Basket (Serbia)
2016	2	45	Demetrius Jackson (from MEM via DEN and DAL)	PG	United States	Notre Dame
2016	2	51	Ben Bentil (from MIA)	PF	Ghana	Providence
2016	2	58	Abdel Nader (from CLE)	SF	Egypt	Iowa State
2017	1	3	Jayson Tatum (from PHI)	SF	United States	Duke
2017	2	37	Semi Ojeleye (from MIN via PHX)	SF/PF	United States	SMU
2017	2	53	Kadeem Allen (from CLE)	SG	United States	Arizona
2017	2	56	Jabari Bird (from LAC)	SG	United States	California
2018	1	27	Robert Williams	PF/C	United States	Texas A&M
2019	1	14	Romeo Langford (from SAC via PHI)	SG	United States	Indiana
2019	1	20	Matisse Thybulle (from LAC via MEM, traded to PHI)	SF	Australia	Washington
2019	1	22	Grant Williams	PF	United States	Tennessee
2019	2	51	Tremont Waters	PG	Puerto Rico	LSU
2020	1	14	Aaron Nesmith (from MEM)	SF	United States	Vanderbilt
2020	1	26	Payton Pritchard	PG	United States	Oregon
2020	1	30	Desmond Bane (from MIL via PHX, traded to MEM)	SG	United States	TCU
2020	2	47	Yam Madar (from BKN via PHI, ORL, and CHA)	PG	Israel	Hapoel Tel Aviv (Israel)
2021	2	45	Juhann Begarin	SG	France	Paris Basketball (France)
2022	2	53	JD Davison	PG	United States	Alabama
2023	2	35	Julian Phillips (from POR via ATL, LAC, DET, and CLE, traded to CHI via WAS)	SF	United States	Tennessee
2024	1	30	Baylor Scheierman	SG/SF	United States	Creighton
2024	2	54	Anton Watson (from DAL via SAC)	PF	United States	Gonzaga
2025	1	28	Hugo González	SF	Spain	Real Madrid (Spain)
2025	2	32	Noah Penda (from DET via BKN and WAS, traded to ORL)	SF	France	Le Mans Sarthe Basket (France)
2026	1	27	Chris Cenac Jr.	PF/C	United States	Houston
2026	2	40	Dillon Mitchell (from MIL via ORL)	SF	United States	St. John's
