= 1948–49 Boston Celtics season =

NBA basketball team season

- Head coach: Doggie Julian
- Arena: Boston Arena; Boston Garden

Results
- Record: 25–35 (.417)
- Place: Division: 5th (Eastern)
- Playoff finish: Did not qualify
- Stats at Basketball Reference
- Radio: WMEX

The 1948–49 Boston Celtics season was the third season of the Boston Celtics in the Basketball Association of America (BAA/NBA). Due to the additions of the Fort Wayne Pistons, Indianapolis Jets, Minneapolis Lakers, and Rochester Royals from the rivaling National Basketball League for this season, the Celtics would see the Eastern Division go back to being more difficult in nature, similar to what it was like to their inaugural season of play as opposed to their previous season of play. This would lead to the Celtics being three games shy of qualifying for the 1949 BAA playoffs despite having a losing record, as their 25–35 record would be three games behind the 28–32 Philadelphia Warriors and four games behind the 29–31 Baltimore Bullets for the final two playoff spots in their division. Following this season's conclusion, the BAA and rivaling NBL would merge operations together to become the present-day National Basketball Association to have 17 teams between the surviving 10-team BAA and surviving 7-team NBL competing in the 1949–50 NBA season.

== Draft picks ==
Round	Pick	Player	Position	Nationality	College
1	3	George Hauptfuhrer	C	United States	Harvard
2	15	Johnny Bach	G/F	United States	Fordham
3	27	Marshall Hawkins	F	United States	Tennessee
4	39	Tom Kelly	G	United States	New York University
5	51	Murray Mitchell	C	United States	Sam Houston State
6	63	Norman Carey	–	United States	Oregon State
7	74	Bob Curran	G	United States	Holy Cross
8	84	Neil Dooley	–	United States	Colgate
9	94	Jack Hauser	–	United States	Denver
10	103	Guinn Phillips	–	United States	Texas Wesleyan
11	108	Ray Wehde	–	United States	Iowa State

Marshall Hawkins would later be transferred to the Indianapolis Olympians by the following season after deciding to play for the Oshkosh All-Stars in the rivaling National Basketball League during this season.

== Roster ==
1948–49 Boston Celtics roster
Players

Pos.	No.	Player	Height	Weight	DOB	From
G/F	17	Johnny Bach	6 ft 2 in (1.88 m)	180 lb (82 kg)	1924-07-10	Fordham
F/C	6	Hank Beenders	6 ft 6 in (1.98 m)	185 lb (84 kg)	1916-06-02	Long Island
F/C	19	Bob Doll	6 ft 5 in (1.96 m)	195 lb (88 kg)	1919-08-10	Colorado
G/F	14	Bulbs Ehlers	6 ft 3 in (1.91 m)	198 lb (90 kg)	1923-03-10	Purdue
G/F	10	Johnny Ezersky	6 ft 3 in (1.91 m)	175 lb (79 kg)	1922-03-21	Rhode Island
F	8	Phil Farbman	6 ft 1 in (1.85 m)	185 lb (84 kg)	1924-04-03	CCNY
G	21	Jack Garfinkel	6 ft 0 in (1.83 m)	190 lb (86 kg)	1918-06-13	St. John's
G	3−10	John Hazen	6 ft 2 in (1.88 m)	172 lb (78 kg)	1927-03-02	Indiana State
SF	9	George Kaftan	6 ft 3 in (1.91 m)	190 lb (86 kg)	1928-02-22	Holy Cross
G	6	Tom Kelly	6 ft 0 in (1.83 m)	170 lb (77 kg)	1924-03-05	NYU
F/C	22	Bob Kinney	6 ft 6 in (1.98 m)	215 lb (98 kg)	1920-09-16	Rice
G/F	20	Al Lucas	6 ft 3 in (1.91 m)	195 lb (88 kg)	1922-07-04	Fordham
F/C	3	George Nostrand	6 ft 8 in (2.03 m)	195 lb (88 kg)	1924-01-25	Wyoming
G	10	Stan Noszka	6 ft 1 in (1.85 m)	185 lb (84 kg)	1920-09-09	Duquesne
G	7	Dermie O'Connell	6 ft 0 in (1.83 m)	174 lb (79 kg)	1928-04-13	Holy Cross
G/F	15	Jim Seminoff	6 ft 2 in (1.88 m)	190 lb (86 kg)	1922-09-01	USC
G/F	20	Earl Shannon	5 ft 11 in (1.80 m)	170 lb (77 kg)	1921-11-23	Rhode Island
F	12	Art Spector	6 ft 4 in (1.93 m)	200 lb (91 kg)	1920-10-17	Villanova
G/F	13	Gene Stump	6 ft 2 in (1.88 m)	185 lb (84 kg)	1923-11-13	DePaul

Coaches
Head coach

Doggie Julian

Legend
- (DP) Unsigned draft pick
- (FA) Free agent
- (S) Suspended
- Injured

Roster

== Regular season ==
=== Season standings ===
#	Eastern Division				
#	Team	W	L	PCT	GB
1	x-Washington Capitols	38	22	.633	–
2	x-New York Knicks	32	28	.533	6
3	x-Baltimore Bullets	29	31	.483	9
4	x-Philadelphia Warriors	28	32	.467	10
5	Boston Celtics	25	35	.417	13
6	Providence Steamrollers	12	48	.200	26

=== Game log ===
#	Date	Opponent	Score	High points	Record
1	November 4	@ Philadelphia	73–94	Gene Stump (23)	0–1
2	November 7	Philadelphia	85–77	Halbert, Stump (19)	1–1
3	November 9	Minneapolis	77–55	Gene Stump (23)	2–1
4	November 12	Fort Wayne	84–75	Bulbs Ehlers (22)	3–1
5	November 13	@ Rochester	63–95	Gene Stump (14)	3–2
6	November 16	@ St. Louis	74–79 (OT)	Ehlers, Stump (18)	3–3
7	November 17	@ Minneapolis	74–72	Gene Stump (24)	4–3
8	November 19	Indianapolis	75–70	Gene Stump (24)	5–3
9	November 20	@ Washington	75–90	Ehlers, Halbert (13)	5–4
10	November 23	Washington	68–71	Bulbs Ehlers (24)	5–5
11	November 25	@ Indianapolis	66–81	Chick Halbert (15)	5–6
12	November 28	@ Fort Wayne	74–80	Chick Halbert (18)	5–7
13	November 30	vs Minneapolis	84–94	Mel Riebe (23)	5–8
14	December 2	@ Philadelphia	88–87	Mel Riebe (25)	6–8
15	December 4	@ Providence	70–63	Bulbs Ehlers (18)	7–8
16	December 6	Rochester	79–87	Bulbs Ehlers (24)	7–9
17	December 13	St. Louis	83–79 (OT)	Gene Stump (25)	8–9
18	December 17	Baltimore	63–74	Tom Kelly (18)	8–10
19	December 18	@ Washington	60–69	Tom Kelly (12)	8–11
20	December 19	New York	77–75	Bob Doll (14)	9–11
21	December 25	@ Philadelphia	77–80	Gene Stump (20)	9–12
22	December 26	@ Chicago	73–84	Bulbs Ehlers (17)	9–13
23	December 28	Chicago	74–76	Tom Kelly (15)	9–14
24	December 31	Providence	69–67	Gene Stump (14)	10–14
25	January 1	@ Baltimore	67–72	Chick Halbert (23)	10–15
26	January 2	@ Fort Wayne	90–69	Tom Kelly (26)	11–15
27	January 4	Baltimore	75–69	Bob Doll (25)	12–15
28	January 7	New York	67–69	Mel Riebe (14)	12–16
29	January 8	@ Providence	69–87	Chick Halbert (14)	12–17
30	January 10	Washington	83–94	Bulbs Ehlers (14)	12–18
31	January 12	@ New York	64–81	Art Spector (19)	12–19
32	January 14	Philadelphia	79–104	Jim Seminoff (21)	12–20
33	January 15	vs Chicago	86–94	Bob Doll (18)	12–21
34	January 18	St. Louis	83–89	Bulbs Ehlers (20)	12–22
35	January 21	Chicago	76–86	Bulbs Ehlers (22)	12–23
36	January 22	@ Washington	64–95	Roberts, Seminoff (14)	12–24
37	January 25	Providence	54–69	George Nostrand (9)	12–25
38	January 28	Washington	91–90	Farbman, Spector (18)	13–25
39	January 29	@ Providence	85–91 (OT)	Gene Stump (28)	13–26
40	February 1	Rochester	68–76	Bob Kinney (13)	13–27
41	February 3	@ Baltimore	76–84	George Kaftan (21)	13–28
42	February 4	Indianapolis	75–64	George Kaftan (16)	14–28
43	February 7	Baltimore	95–83	Dermie O'Connell (19)	15–28
44	February 11	Providence	94–77	George Kaftan (18)	16–28
45	February 18	Minneapolis	71–85	George Kaftan (19)	16–29
46	February 19	@ New York	87–77	Ezersky, Kaftan (15)	17–29
47	February 22	@ Indianapolis	68–74	Kaftan, O'Connell (12)	17–30
48	February 23	@ St. Louis	83–77	George Kaftan (21)	18–30
49	February 25	St. Louis	102–83	George Nostrand (19)	19–30
50	February 26	@ Rochester	59–64	George Kaftan (10)	19–31
51	March 4	Fort Wayne	76–70	George Kaftan (14)	20–31
52	March 5	@ New York	61–66	Nostrand, Seminoff (13)	20–32
53	March 7	@ Indianapolis	107–86	Doll, O'Connell (17)	21–32
54	March 8	vs Fort Wayne	63–60	Kinney, O'Connell (14)	22–32
55	March 9	@ Minneapolis	67–74	George Nostrand (17)	22–33
56	March 11	Philadelphia	108–100	Bulbs Ehlers (22)	23–33
57	March 12	@ Baltimore	77–89	Johnny Ezersky (14)	23–34
58	March 15	Rochester	86–83	George Kaftan (24)	24–34
59	March 16	vs Chicago	82–107	Johnny Ezersky (21)	24–35
60	March 18	New York	70–56	George Kaftan (25)	25–35
