= Ken Reeves =

Ken or Kenneth Reeves may refer to:

- Ken Reeves (American football) (born 1961), offensive tackle for six seasons in NFL
- Ken Reeves (basketball), drafted in 1950 Boston Celtics draft history
- Kenneth Reeves (born 1951), former mayor of Cambridge, Massachusetts
- Ken Reeves (meteorologist) (1961–2012), meteorologist for AccuWeather
