= Mickey Marty =

American basketball player

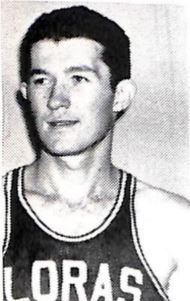
- Marty during the 1947–48 season

Personal information
- Born: February 24, 1922 Dubuque, Iowa, U.S.
- Died: March 8, 2013 (aged 91) Galesburg, Illinois, U.S.
- Listed height: 6 ft 2 in (1.88 m)

Career information
- High school: Loras Academy (Dubuque, Iowa)
- College: Loras (1941–1942, 1945–1948)
- BAA draft: 1948: – round, –
- Drafted by: Chicago Stags
- Position: Forward

Career highlights
- Second-team All-American – Converse (1948); First-team All-IIAC (1946)
- Stats at Basketball Reference

Merlin J. "Mickey" Marty (February 24, 1922 – March 8, 2013) was an American basketball player. He played college basketball at Loras College in Dubuque, Iowa, where in 1948 he was an All-American.

Marty played prep basketball at Loras Academy and in 1939 led the team to the Iowa Catholic School championship. He enrolled at hometown Loras College and played the 1940–41 season for the Duhawks. His college experience was interrupted as he served in the United States Marine Corps during World War II. He would then re-enroll at Loras for the 1945–46 season after a three-year absence. In the 1946–47 season, he led the team to a 24–5 team and a spot in the 1947 NAIA men's basketball tournament. In his final season with the Duhawks, Marty averaged 18.5 points per game and led the team to a 23–8 record, setting three Iowa Conference scoring records. At the close of the season, he was named a second-team All-American by Converse, making him the first player from a small college to be named to a major All-American team.

Following the close of his college career, Marty was drafted by the Chicago Stags in the 1948 BAA draft but turned down an offer to play for the team to move into coaching and focus on his young family. He coached high school basketball at St. Joseph's Academy in Mason City, Iowa, and later in Wisconsin. He then refereed high school basketball games for a time before turning to managing recreational bowling centers.

Marty died on March 8, 2013, in Galesburg, Illinois, at age 91.
