= A. L. Bennett =

American basketball player (1924–2008)

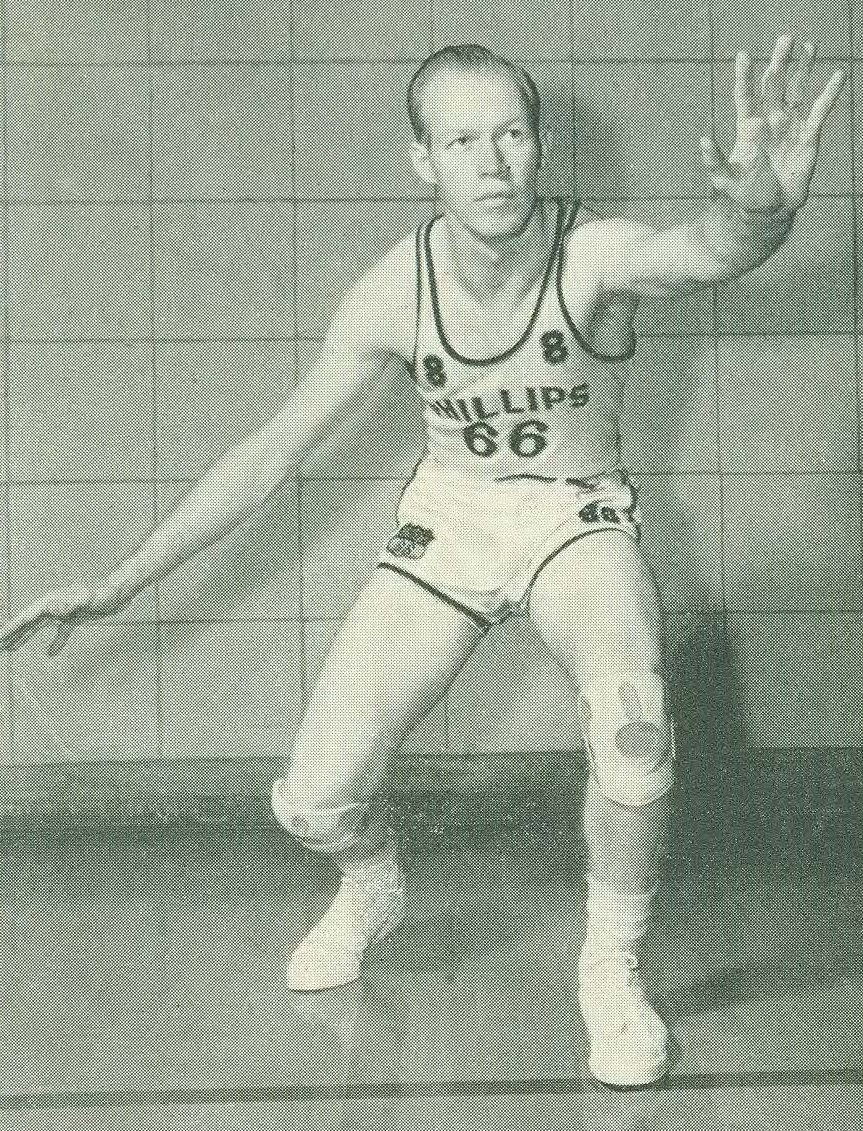
- Bennett with the Phillips 66ers

Personal information
- Born: February 20, 1924 Heavener, Oklahoma, U.S.
- Died: June 25, 2008 (aged 84) Tulsa, Oklahoma, U.S.
- Listed height: 6 ft 2 in (1.88 m)
- Listed weight: 165 lb (75 kg)

Career information
- High school: Holdenville (Holdenville, Oklahoma)
- College: Oklahoma State (1942–1943, 1945–1948)
- NBA draft: 1948: – round, –
- Drafted by: Providence Steamrollers
- Position: Forward
- Number: 65

Career highlights
- NCAA champion (1946); Third-team All-American – AP (1948); 2× All-MVC (1947, 1948)
- Stats at Basketball Reference

Ambrose L. Bennett (February 20, 1924 – June 25, 2008) was an American basketball player. He was an All-American at Oklahoma State University and a member of the school's 1945–46 national championship team.

Bennett, a 6'3" forward from Holdenville, Oklahoma, came to Oklahoma State (then known as Oklahoma A&M) in 1942. However, he was soon volunteered for service in the United States Army in World War II. Bennett fought in the Battle of the Bulge and was wounded, earning a Purple Heart.

After the war, in 1945, Bennett returned to Oklahoma A&M and was a key reserve for the Aggies' 1946 NCAA championship team under coach Henry Iba. Bennett became a starter for his last two seasons, earning first team All-Missouri Valley Conference honors in 1947 and 1948. Bennett was also named a third team All-American by the Associated Press in 1948, his senior year. He scored 628 points in his Aggie career, averaging 7.7 points per game.

After graduation, Bennett was drafted by the Providence Steamrollers. He opted to play in the Amateur Athletic Union with the Phillips 66ers instead, and worked for the Phillips Petroleum Company for over 18 years.

A. L. Bennett died on June 25, 2008, and was buried at Memorial Park Cemetery in Tulsa, Oklahoma.
