= Al Lucas (basketball) =

American basketball player

Personal information
- Born: July 4, 1922 New York City, New York, U.S.
- Died: April 26, 1995 (aged 72) Levittown, New York, U.S.
- Listed height: 6 ft 3 in (1.91 m)
- Listed weight: 195 lb (88 kg)

Career information
- High school: St. John's Prep (Queens, New York)
- College: Fordham (1942–1943)
- Playing career: 1944–1948
- Position: Forward / guard
- Number: 20

Career history
- 1944–1948: Sheboygan Red Skins
- 1948: Boston Celtics
- Stats at NBA.com
- Stats at Basketball Reference

Albert Thomas Lucas (July 4, 1922 – April 26, 1995) was a professional basketball player who spent four seasons with the Sheboygan Redskins in the National Basketball League and one season in the Basketball Association of America (BAA) as a member of the Boston Celtics during the 1948–49 season. He attended Fordham University.

== BAA career statistics ==
Legend
GP	Games played
FG%	Field-goal percentage
FT%	Free-throw percentage
APG	Assists per game
PPG	Points per game

=== Regular season ===
Year	Team	GP	FG%	FT%	APG	PPG
1948–49	Boston	2	.333	.000	1.0	1.0
Career		2	.333	.000	1.0	1.0
