= Bob Gale (basketball) =

American basketball player

Personal information
- Born: April 22, 1925 Queens, New York, U.S.
- Died: May 29, 1975 (aged 50) Skokie, Illinois, U.S.
- Listed height: 6 ft 5 in (1.96 m)

Career information
- High school: Andrew Jackson (Queens, New York)
- College: Cornell (1943–1944, 1946–1948); Dartmouth (1944)
- BAA draft: 1948: 1st round, 7th overall pick
- Drafted by: St. Louis Bombers
- Position: Center

Career highlights
- Second-team All-American – Helms (1948); 2× First-team All-EIL (1944, 1948)
- Stats at Basketball Reference

Robert W. Gale (April 22, 1925 – May 29, 1975) was an American basketball player. He was an All-American college player at Cornell and a first-round pick in the 1948 BAA draft.

== Early life and family ==
Gale was born in New York City. He attended Andrew Jackson High School in Queens, New York City. He attended as an undergraduate at Cornell University in 1943 as part of a naval training program.

== College athlete ==
Due to the shortage of college-aged players brought about by World War II, Gale was one of many freshmen nationwide who were allowed to play despite NCAA eligibility rules of the day. He quickly captured the starting center spot for the Big Red. At the close of the season he was named to the All-Eastern Intercollegiate League team. Following the regular season, Gale's V-12 training program moved him to conference rival Dartmouth. Dartmouth had won the Eastern Intercollegiate Basketball League but had lost seven of its top ten players to military service. Gale was added as was Haggerty Award winner Dick McGuire from St. John's. The two newcomers joined All-American Aud Brindley to lead the Indians all the way to the national championship game, which they lost to Utah in overtime. Gale had a memorable performance in the team's opening game against Catholic University, leading Dartmouth in scoring with 17 points.

After two years serving in the U.S. Navy, Gale returned to Cornell in 1946 to continue his college career and was named captain of the team. However, he sustained a knee injury that caused him to miss the majority of the season. Gale returned to the hardwood for the 1947–48 season and was again named captain. Gale was again named to the all-conference first team and was named a second-team All-American by the Helms Athletic Foundation. Following the season, Gale was named to the East squad of the college All-Star game.

== Career ==
=== Professional athlete ===
Following his college career, Gale was drafted by the St. Louis Bombers in the 1948 BAA draft, however he never played in the Basketball Association of America (BAA) or the NBA. He played briefly for the New York Athletic Club and various barnstorming teams.

=== Business ===
Gale pursued a career in business in 1950 with the Gold Seal Company. He was with the company for 25 years before dying unexpectedly due to a heart attack at age 50 on May 29, 1975, on a business trip in Skokie, Illinois.
