= Chuck Hanger =

American basketball player (1924–1995)

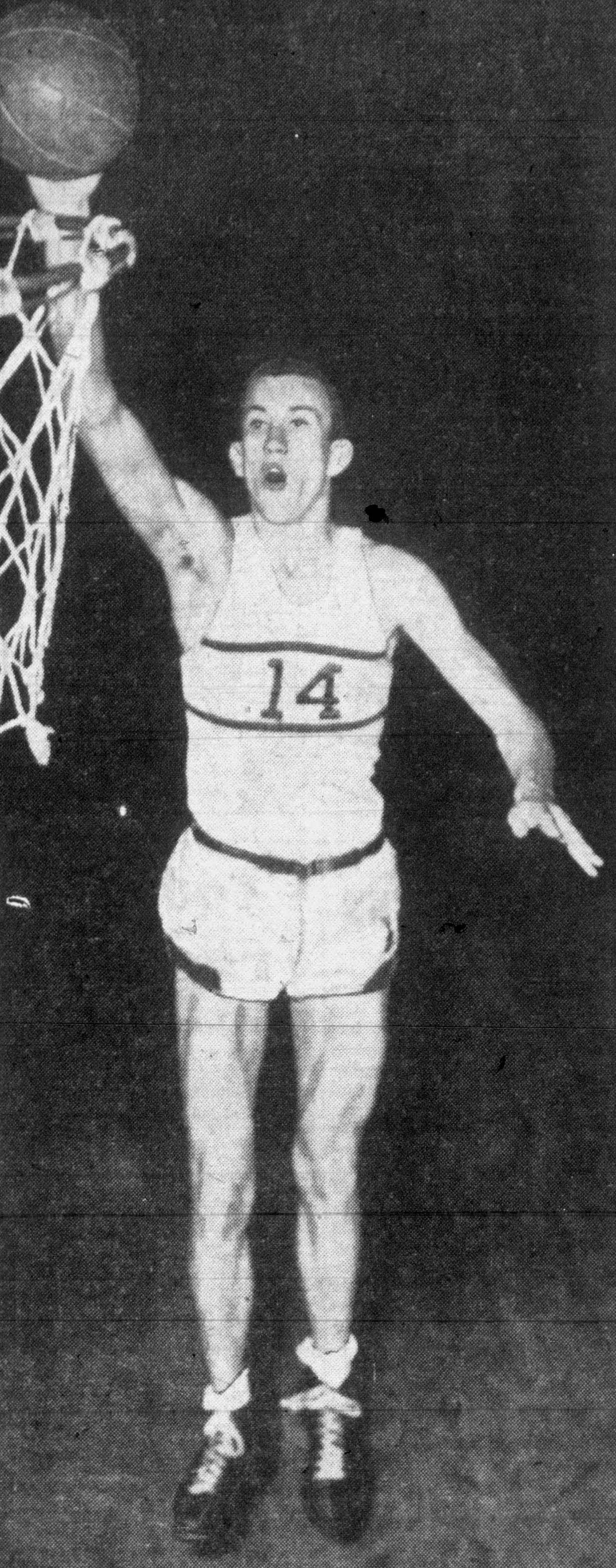
- Hanger, circa 1943

Personal information
- Born: February 23, 1924; Alameda, California, U.S.
- Died: July 23, 1995 (aged 71)
- Listed height: 6 ft 6 in (1.98 m)

Career information
- High school: Berkeley (Berkeley, California)
- College: California (1942–1943, 1946–1948)
- BAA draft: 1948: 1st round, 9th overall pick
- Selected by the Minneapolis Lakers
- Position: Forward

Career history
- 1948–1949: Oakland Bittners
- 1949–1952: Oakland Blue n' Gold Atlas

Career highlights and awards
- First-team All-PCC (1948); 2× AAU All-American (1949, 1950)
- Stats at Basketball Reference

Charles E. Hanger (February 23, 1924 – July 23, 1995) was an American basketball player, known for his career as a collegian at the University of California, Berkeley (Cal) and as an All-American player in the Amateur Athletic Union (AAU) in the late 1940s and early 1950s.

Hanger attended Berkeley High School in Berkeley, California before moving to hometown Cal. After playing his first two seasons at Cal, Hanger enlisted in the United States Army in 1943 to fight in World War II. While in combat in Belgium, Hanger was captured on December 19, 1944, and held until released by American forces in April 1945. Following his service, Hanger returned to the Bears' lineup for the 1946–47 and 1947–48 seasons. As a senior, he was honored as an All-Pacific Coast Conference selection alongside teammate Andy Wolfe.

Following the close of his college career, Hanger was drafted by the Minneapolis Lakers in the 1948 BAA draft. However, he decided to instead play closer to home in the AAU, which was a common route for players of his generation. The 6'6" forward played for the Oakland Bittners and Oakland Blue n' Gold Atlas for four seasons. He won an AAU championship alongside Hall of Fame player Don Barksdale with the Bittners in 1949 and was twice named an AAU All-American (in 1949 and 1950).

After leaving basketball, Hanger was an attorney in the Bay Area for over 30 years. He died on July 23, 1995.
