= Bob Kinney =

American basketball player (1920–1985)

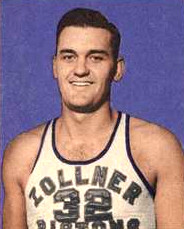
- Kinney in 1948

Personal information
- Born: September 16, 1920 Bexar County, Texas, U.S.
- Died: September 2, 1985 (aged 64) Asheville, North Carolina, U.S.
- Listed height: 6 ft 6 in (1.98 m)
- Listed weight: 215 lb (98 kg)

Career information
- High school: Jefferson (San Antonio, Texas)
- College: Rice (1939–1942)
- Playing career: 1945–1951
- Position: Center / power forward
- Number: 32, 22

Career history
- 1945–1949: Fort Wayne Zollner Pistons
- 1949–1950: Boston Celtics
- 1950–1951: Anderson Packers

Career highlights
- Consensus first-team All-American (1942); Consensus second-team All-American (1941); 3× All-SWC (1940–1942); No. 23 retired by Rice Owls

Career BAA/NBA statistics
- Points: 1,125
- Rebounds: Not tracked
- Assists: 177
- Stats at NBA.com
- Stats at Basketball Reference

Robert Paul Kinney (September 16, 1920 – September 2, 1985) was an American professional basketball player in the Basketball Association of America (BAA), National Basketball Association (NBA) and National Professional Basketball League (NPBL). Besides Bob, his nicknames included Hi-Pocket and Bat-em Bob. Kinney, who attended high school in San Antonio, Texas, went to college at Rice University where he was a standout on the basketball team in 1940–41 and 1941–42.

During his career at Rice, Kinney, who was an imposing 6 ft 6 in (1.98 m), 215 pounds (98 kg) center and forward, was a two-time consensus All-American. He was a Second Team selection in 1941 and a First Team All-American in 1942. He joined the Fort Wayne Pistons of the National Basketball League (a precursor to the NBA) in 1945. On January 30, 1949, he was sold by the Pistons to the Boston Celtics and finished out the year with them. At the conclusion of the season, the BAA merged with some of the teams from the NBL to form the NBA. Kinney was retained for the 1949–50 season, which was the NBA's first, and therefore the Celtics' first in the league. In 60 games that year, Kinney scored 667 points (11.1 ppg). Kinney's NBA career ended after that season, but he played for the Anderson Packers of the NPBL in 1950–51. In 23 games, he averaged 12.4 points. On November 19, 1950, he tied a Packers franchise record with 28 points in a 73–81 loss to the Louisville Alumnites.

== BAA/NBA career statistics ==
Legend
GP	Games played	FG%	Field-goal percentage
FT%	Free-throw percentage	APG	Assists per game
PPG	Points per game	**Bold**	Career high

=== Regular season ===
Year	Team	GP	FG%	FT%	APG	PPG
1948–49	Fort Wayne	37	.317	.573	1.4	6.9
1948–49	Boston	21	.335	.593	1.2	9.7
1949–50	Boston	**60**	**.375**	**.628**	**1.7**	**11.1**
Career		118	.353	.608	1.5	9.5
