= 1949–50 Boston Celtics season =

NBA basketball team season

- Head coach: Doggie Julian
- Arena: Boston Arena; Boston Garden

Results
- Record: 22–46 (.324)
- Place: Division: 6th (Eastern)
- Playoff finish: Did not qualify
- Stats at Basketball Reference
- Radio: WMEX

The 1949–50 Boston Celtics season was the fourth season of the Boston Celtics in the National Basketball Association (NBA). After the Basketball Association of America that the Celtics were in merged operations with the rivaling National Basketball League to create the present-day NBA, the Celtics would compete in the Eastern Division that remained mostly intact outside of the NBL's Syracuse Nationals replacing the Providence Steamrollers, with teams there competing in 68 games for the regular season outside of the aforementioned Syracuse Nationals. Despite the Celtics and every other Eastern Division team having more games played than the Nationals this season, the Celtics would finish the season as a last place team in their division with a 22–46 record, being four games behind the Philadelphia Warriors in their division and failing to qualify for the NBA's inaugural 1950 NBA playoffs. This was the last time the Celtics both finished below .500 and missed the playoffs until the 1969–70 season.

== BAA/NBA Draft ==
| Round | Pick | Player | Position | Nationality | College |
|---|---|---|---|---|---|
| 1 | 4 | Tony Lavelli | F | United States | Yale |
| 2 | 16 | George Kaftan | F | United States | Holy Cross |
| 3 | 28 | Joe Mullaney | G | United States | Holy Cross |
| 4 | 39 | Bill Tom | – | United States | Rice |
| 5 | 48 | Ed Little | – | United States | Denver Junior College |
| 6 | 55 | Jim Simpson | – | United States | Bates |
| 7 | 61 | Bill Vandenburgh | – | United States | Washington |
| 8 | 67 | Duane Klueh | G | United States | Indiana State |
| 9 | 72 | Emerson Speicher | – | United States | Bowling Green |
| 10 | 74 | Bill Weight | – | United States | BYU |
| 11 | 76 | Russ Washburn | – | United States | Colby |

== Roster ==
1949–50 Boston Celtics roster
Players

| Pos. | No. | Player | Height | Weight | DOB | From |
|---|---|---|---|---|---|---|
| F/C | 19 | Bob Doll | 6 ft 5 in (1.96 m) | 195 lb (88 kg) | | Colorado |
| F/C | 10 | Gene Englund | 6 ft 5 in (1.96 m) | 205 lb (93 kg) | | Wisconsin |
| G/F | 16 | Johnny Ezersky | 6 ft 3 in (1.91 m) | 175 lb (79 kg) | | Rhode Island |
| F/C | 10 | Ward Gibson | 6 ft 5 in (1.96 m) | 198 lb (90 kg) | | Creighton |
| G | 4 | Sidney Hertzberg | 5 ft 10 in (1.78 m) | 175 lb (79 kg) | | CCNY |
| F | 9 | George Kaftan | 6 ft 3 in (1.91 m) | 190 lb (86 kg) | | Holy Cross |
| F/C | 22 | Bob Kinney | 6 ft 6 in (1.98 m) | 215 lb (98 kg) | | Rice |
| F | 4−11 | Tony Lavelli | 6 ft 3 in (1.91 m) | 185 lb (84 kg) | | Yale |
| G/F | 5 | Ed Leede | 6 ft 3 in (1.91 m) | 185 lb (84 kg) | | Dartmouth |
| C | 16 | John Mahnken | 6 ft 8 in (2.03 m) | 220 lb (100 kg) | | Georgetown |
| G | 17 | Joe Mullaney | 6 ft 0 in (1.83 m) | 165 lb (75 kg) | | Holy Cross |
| F/C | 3 | George Nostrand | 6 ft 8 in (2.03 m) | 195 lb (88 kg) | | Wyoming |
| G | 7 | Dermie O'Connell | 6 ft 0 in (1.83 m) | 174 lb (79 kg) | | Holy Cross |
| G/F | 15 | Jim Seminoff | 6 ft 2 in (1.88 m) | 190 lb (86 kg) | | USC |
| G/F | 8 | Howie Shannon | 6 ft 2 in (1.88 m) | 175 lb (79 kg) | | Kansas State |
| F | 12 | Art Spector | 6 ft 4 in (1.93 m) | 200 lb (91 kg) | | Villanova |
| F/C | 13 | Brady Walker | 6 ft 6 in (1.98 m) | 205 lb (93 kg) | | BYU |

Coaches
Head coach
- Doggie Julian

Legend
- (DP) Unsigned draft pick
- (FA) Free agent
- (S) Suspended
- Injured

== Regular season ==
=== Season standings ===
| Eastern Division | W | L | PCT | GB | Home | Road | Neutral | Div |
|---|---|---|---|---|---|---|---|---|
| x-Syracuse Nationals | 51 | 13 | .797 | – | 31–1 | 15–12 | 5–0 | 9–1 |
| x-New York Knicks | 40 | 28 | .588 | 13 | 19–10 | 18–16 | 3–2 | 20–6 |
| x-Washington Capitols | 32 | 36 | .471 | 21 | 21–13 | 10–20 | 1–3 | 13–13 |
| x-Philadelphia Warriors | 26 | 42 | .382 | 25 | 15–15 | 8–23 | 3–4 | 9–17 |
| Baltimore Bullets | 25 | 43 | .368 | 26 | 16–15 | 8–25 | 1–3 | 8–18 |
| Boston Celtics | 22 | 46 | .324 | 29 | 12–14 | 5–28 | 5–4 | 11–15 |

=== Game log ===
1949–50 Game log
| # | Date | Opponent | Score | High points | Record |
| 1 | November 3 | at Sheboygan | 83–98 | Hertzberg, Leede (13) | 0–1 |
| 2 | November 5 | at Chicago | 70–86 | Sidney Hertzberg (13) | 0–2 |
| 3 | November 6 | at Waterloo | 66–80 | Bob Kinney (12) | 0–3 |
| 4 | November 10 | Minneapolis | 84–98 | George Kaftan (18) | 0–4 |
| 5 | November 12 | at Washington | 76–68 | Brady Walker (20) | 1–4 |
| 6 | November 15 | Baltimore | 76–81 | Sidney Hertzberg (20) | 1–5 |
| 7 | November 16 | at Philadelphia | 80–93 | Johnny Ezersky (15) | 1–6 |
| 8 | November 17 | Indianapolis | 90–68 | Sidney Hertzberg (16) | 2–6 |
| 9 | November 19 | at Baltimore | W 91–82 | Sidney Hertzberg (22) | 3–6 |
| 10 | November 20 | at Fort Wayne | 89–99 | Bob Kinney (14) | 3–7 |
| 11 | November 21 | at Anderson | 99–85 | Sidney Hertzberg (23) | 4–7 |
| 12 | November 22 | at Tri-Cities | 72–80 | Sidney Hertzberg (19) | 4–8 |
| 13 | November 24 | Fort Wayne | 85–99 | Tony Lavelli (20) | 4–9 |
| 14 | November 26 | at New York | 84–96 | George Kaftan (34) | 4–10 |
| 15 | November 30 | Syracuse | 71–87 | Lavelli, Walker (17) | 4–11 |
| 16 | December 3 | at Tri-Cities | 82–87 | Ed Leede (20) | 4–12 |
| 17 | December 4 | at St. Louis | 76–85 | Bob Kinney (18) | 4–13 |
| 18 | December 6 | at Indianapolis | 82–93 | Bob Kinney (24) | 4–14 |
| 19 | December 8 | Philadelphia | 91–87 | George Kaftan (16) | 5–14 |
| 20 | December 10 | vs Sheboygan | 83–78 | Brady Walker (15) | 6–14 |
| 21 | December 15 | St. Louis | 83–81 | Ed Leede (21) | 7–14 |
| 22 | December 18 | at Minneapolis | 72–77 | Sidney Hertzberg (18) | 7–15 |
| 23 | December 22 | Minneapolis | 87–69 | Tony Lavelli (26) | 8–15 |
| 24 | December 23 | at Washington | 73–86 | Englund, Lavelli (11) | 8–16 |
| 25 | December 25 | at Rochester | 79–88 | Gene Englund (13) | 8–17 |
| 26 | December 26 | vs Baltimore | 82–57 | Tony Lavelli (15) | 9–17 |
| 27 | December 27 | New York | 97–78 | Bob Doll (18) | 10–17 |
| 28 | December 30 | Fort Wayne | 92–73 | Bob Kinney (18) | 11–17 |
| 29 | January 1 | at Fort Wayne | 72–80 | Howie Shannon (12) | 11–18 |
| 30 | January 4 | at St. Louis | 68–72 | Hertzberg, Kaftan (17) | 11–19 |
| 31 | January 6 | Baltimore | 74–53 | Gene Englund (17) | 12–19 |
| 32 | January 8 | at Minneapolis | 80–85 (OT) | Bob Kinney (18) | 12–20 |
| 33 | January 10 | at Denver | 97–84 | George Kaftan (17) | 13–20 |
| 34 | January 13 | Chicago | L 76–77 | Bob Kinney (14) | 13–21 |
| 35 | January 14 | at New York | L 80–82 | Sidney Hertzberg (15) | 13–22 |
| 36 | January 17 | Minneapolis | L 79–105 | George Kaftan (16) | 13–23 |
| 37 | January 18 | at Philadelphia | L 86–94 | Bob Kinney (16) | 13–24 |
| 38 | January 19 | Philadelphia | W 86–63 | Howie Shannon (17) | 14–24 |
| 39 | January 22 | at St. Louis | L 47–71 | Tony Lavelli (11) | 14–25 |
| 40 | January 26 | Fort Wayne | W 89–68 | Sidney Hertzberg (21) | 15–25 |
| 41 | January 28 | at Rochester | L 75–82 | Ed Leede (14) | 15–26 |
| 42 | January 31 | Rochester | L 72–85 | Ed Leede (14) | 15–27 |
| 43 | February 1 | vs. Chicago | L 76–78 | Ed Leede (21) | 15–28 |
| 44 | February 3 | Anderson | W 106–98 | Ed Leede (24) | 16–28 |
| 45 | February 4 | vs Waterloo | W 100–82 | Howie Shannon (22) | 17–28 |
| 46 | February 5 | vs. Chicago | L 70–77 | Hertzberg, Kaftan (16) | 17–29 |
| 47 | February 7 | Chicago | L 86–91 | Ed Leede (21) | 17–30 |
| 48 | February 10 | St. Louis | W 89–79 | Ed Leede (24) | 18–30 |
| 49 | February 12 | at Minneapolis | L 70–88 | Sidney Hertzberg (22) | 18–31 |
| 50 | February 14 | vs. Denver | L 78–84 | Ed Leede (21) | 18–32 |
| 51 | February 15 | at Fort Wayne | L 78–84 | George Kaftan (19) | 18–33 |
| 52 | February 17 | Rochester | L 73–81 | Bob Kinney (19) | 18–34 |
| 53 | February 18 | vs. Rochester | L 73–94 | Sidney Hertzberg (16) | 18–35 |
| 54 | February 23 | vs. Philadelphia | W 82–77 | Ed Leede (24) | 19–35 |
| 55 | February 24 | Washington | W 89–74 | Tony Lavelli (19) | 20–35 |
| 56 | February 25 | at Baltimore | W 82–66 | Ed Leede (22) | 21–35 |
| 57 | February 27 | Chicago | L 77–79 | Bob Kinney (16) | 21–36 |
| 58 | March 1 | at Philadelphia | L 64–77 | Kinney, Lavelli (12) | 21–37 |
| 59 | March 2 | New York | L 72–81 | Tony Lavelli (28) | 21–38 |
| 60 | March 4 | at Washington | L 75–95 | Hertzberg, Lavelli (15) | 21–39 |
| 61 | March 7 | vs. Washington | W 75–64 | Tony Lavelli (19) | 22–39 |
| 62 | March 9 | at Rochester | L 59–78 | John Mahnken (12) | 22–40 |
| 63 | March 10 | Washington | L 66–76 | Tony Lavelli (22) | 22–41 |
| 64 | March 11 | at Baltimore | L 75–79 | Tony Lavelli (23) | 22–42 |
| 65 | March 12 | at Syracuse | L 72–96 | Howie Shannon (21) | 22–43 |
| 66 | March 14 | St. Louis | L 76–86 | Ed Leede (25) | 22–44 |
| 67 | March 15 | at New York | L 84–88 (OT) | Tony Lavelli (28) | 22–45 |
| 68 | March 17 | New York | L 96–98 (2OT) | Doll, Leede (22) | 22–46 |
