= Phil Farbman =

American basketball player

Personal information
- Born: April 3, 1924 Brooklyn, New York
- Died: September 15, 1996 (aged 72)
- Listed height: 6 ft 1 in (1.85 m)
- Listed weight: 185 lb (84 kg)

Career information
- College: Brooklyn (1941–1943); CCNY (1947–1948)
- BAA draft: 1948: undrafted
- Playing career: 1948–1949
- Position: Forward
- Number: 15, 8

Career history
- 1948–1949: Philadelphia Warriors
- 1949: Boston Celtics
- Stats at NBA.com
- Stats at Basketball Reference

Philip M. Farbman (April 3, 1924 – September 15, 1996) was an American professional basketball player.

== Biography ==
He was born in Brooklyn, New York, to Jewish immigrants Harry and Ida Farbman and was Jewish. He attended and played basketball at Brooklyn College (1941–43) and City College of New York (1947–48). He entered the US Army in 1943 to fight in World War II.

He was drafted in the first round of the 1948 Draft by the Philadelphia Warriors. He spent one season in the Basketball Association of America (BAA) as a member of the Philadelphia Warriors and Boston Celtics (1948–49).

== BAA career statistics ==
Legend
GP	Games played	FG%	Field-goal percentage
FT%	Free-throw percentage	APG	Assists per game
PPG	Points per game	**Bold**	Career high

=== Regular season ===
Year	Team	GP	FG%	FT%	APG	PPG
1948–49	Philadelphia	27	.341	.581	.7	3.1
1948–49	Boston	21	.269	.789	.9	3.4
Career		48	.307	.679	.8	3.2
