= Ed Leede =

American basketball player (1927–2018)

Personal information
- Born: July 17, 1927 New York City, New York, U.S.
- Died: February 24, 2018 (aged 90)
- Listed height: 6 ft 3 in (1.91 m)
- Listed weight: 185 lb (84 kg)

Career information
- High school: Bayside (Bayside, New York)
- College: Dartmouth (1945, 1947–1949)
- NBA draft: 1949: 3rd round, –
- Drafted by: Providence Steamrollers
- Playing career: 1949–1951
- Position: Forward / guard
- Number: 5

Career history

Playing
- 1949–1951: Boston Celtics

Coaching
- 1951–1952: MIT

Career NBA statistics
- Points: 949 (7.8 ppg)
- Rebounds: 118 (2.1 rpg)
- Assists: 225 (1.9 apg)
- Stats at NBA.com
- Stats at Basketball Reference

Edward Horst Leede (July 17, 1927 – February 24, 2018) was an American professional basketball player. Leede was selected in the third round in the 1949 BAA draft by the Providence Steamrollers. He played for the Boston Celtics, however, during his two-year BAA/NBA career. Dartmouth College, his alma mater, named their basketball arena after him. He would earn an MBA at Harvard Business School.

He died on February 24, 2018, at the age of 90.

== NBA career statistics ==
Legend
GP	Games played	MPG	Minutes per game
FG%	Field-goal percentage	FT%	Free-throw percentage
RPG	Rebounds per game	APG	Assists per game
PPG	Points per game	**Bold**	Career high

=== Regular season ===
Year	Team	GP	FG%	FT%	RPG	APG	PPG
1949–50	Boston	**64**	**.343**	.706	–	**2.0**	**8.9**
1950–51	Boston	57	.322	**.741**	2.1	1.7	6.6
Career		121	.334	.719	2.1	1.9	7.8

=== Playoffs ===
Year	Team	GP	FG%	FT%	RPG	APG	PPG
1951	Boston	2	.143	1.000	0.0	1.0	1.5
Career		2	.143	1.000	0.0	1.0	1.5
