= Tony Lavelli =

American basketball player (1926–1998)

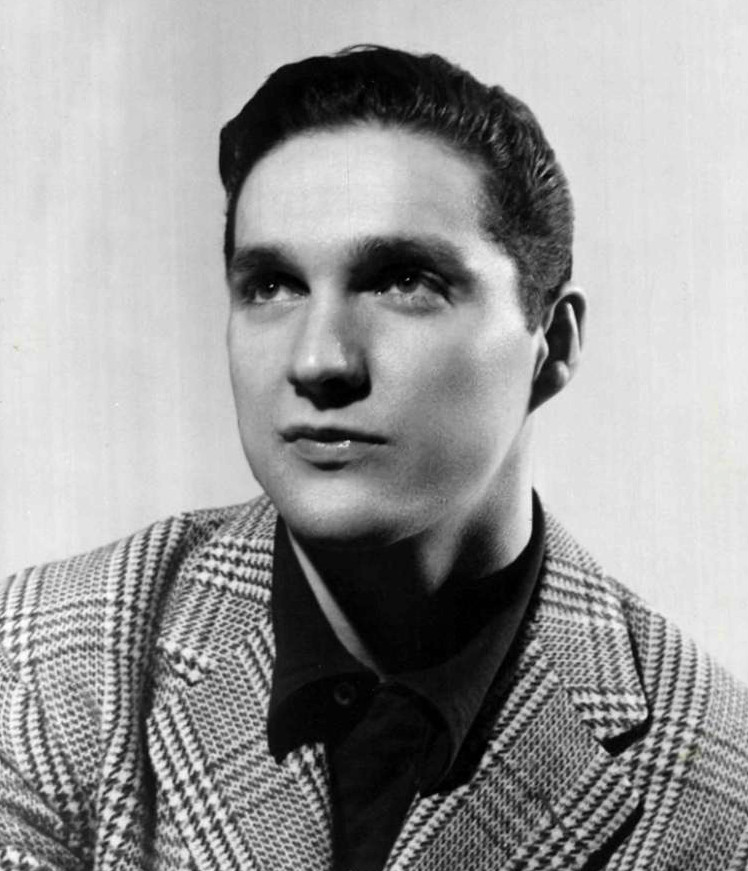
- Lavelli in 1959

Personal information
- Born: July 11, 1926 Somerville, Massachusetts, U.S.
- Died: January 8, 1998 (aged 71) Laconia, New Hampshire, U.S.
- Listed height: 6 ft 3 in (1.91 m)
- Listed weight: 185 lb (84 kg)

Career information
- High school: Somerville (Somerville, Massachusetts)
- College: Yale (1945–1949)
- BAA draft: 1949: 1st round, 4th overall pick
- Drafted by: Boston Celtics
- Playing career: 1949–1951
- Position: Small forward
- Number: 4, 11, 6, 16

Career history
- 1949–1950: Boston Celtics
- 1950–1951: New York Knicks

Career highlights
- Helms Foundation Player of the Year (1949); Consensus first-team All-American (1949); 2× Consensus second-team All-American (1946, 1948); NCAA scoring champion (1949)

Career NBA statistics
- Points: 591 (6.9 ppg)
- Rebounds: 59 (2.0 rpg)
- Assists: 63 (0.7 apg)
- Stats at NBA.com
- Stats at Basketball Reference

Anthony Lavelli Jr. (July 11, 1926 – January 8, 1998) was an American professional basketball player and musician. He averaged 6.9 points per game during his two-year National Basketball Association (NBA) career (1949–1951) while also providing half-time entertainment with his accordion performances.

== College ==
A native of Somerville, Massachusetts, Lavelli attended Yale University as a music student and was a member of Skull and Bones. He aspired to compose musical comedies after he graduated. He wrote over a dozen songs while in college, with titles like "I Want a Helicopter" and "You're the Boppiest Bee-Bop", and he also appeared as an accordion soloist for the New Haven Symphony Orchestra. As a senior, he applied to the Juilliard School, the Curtis Institute of Music, and the New England Conservatory of Music.

However, Lavelli's musical talents were often overshadowed by his achievements on the basketball court. Lavelli claimed that he had only learned basketball as a teenager to impress his friends, who were mostly apathetic to his music. Nevertheless, he would become one of Yale's all-time greatest players. A 6'3" forward with an accurate one-handed hook shot, he scored 1,964 points in four years and graduated as the fourth highest-scorer in college basketball history. He also earned four All-American team selections and one Player of the Year award during his college career. Upon graduating, he was selected by the Boston Celtics as the fourth overall pick in the 1949 BAA draft.

=== College statistics ===
Year	Team	GP	FG%	FT%	PPG
1948–49	Yale	30	.350	.824	22.4

== Professional basketball ==
Despite his athletic accomplishments, Lavelli's first love was music, and he initially refused to sign with the Celtics so that he could enroll at Juilliard. Eventually, based on suggestions made by sports executive Leo Ferris, Lavelli proposed to join the team on the condition that they would pay him an extra $125 per game to play his accordion during half-time breaks at Boston Garden and certain visitors' arenas. The Celtics conceded to his demands.

Lavelli made his Celtics debut on November 24, 1949, in a game against the Fort Wayne Pistons. He tallied 20 points in his first game, and averaged 8.8 points per game over the course of the 1949–50 NBA season. However, he received much more attention for his half-time accordion performances; indeed, some basketball historians have credited Lavelli's mini-concerts for saving the Celtics franchise, which was in danger of folding due to lack of fans and money. In a typical performance, Lavelli would greet the fans and play "Granada", "Lady of Spain", and other musical pieces before dashing off to the Celtics' locker room. He usually played in his basketball jersey, as he had little time to change his clothes. The Celtics finished last in their division that season, but one newspaper joked that the team "doubtless [found] his music soothing".

Lavelli signed with the rival New York Knicks prior to the start of the 1950–51 NBA season. He averaged 3.3 points per game with the Knicks and participated in their playoff run, which ended in the 1951 NBA Finals at the hands of the Rochester Royals. However, Lavelli had joined the Knicks so that he would be close to Juilliard, and he began taking courses there during his tenure with the team.

During the mid-1950s, Lavelli played with the College All-Stars, who primarily served as opponents to the Harlem Globetrotters, and his accordion performances became a fixture of the Globetrotters’ halftime shows.

== Post-basketball career ==
After retiring from basketball in the late 1950s, Lavelli embarked on a long career as a songwriter and nightclub performer. He released two records during his life: All-American Accordionist and Accordion Classics.

== Personal life ==
Lavelli's cousin, Dante Lavelli, played for the Cleveland Browns in the 1940s and 1950s and was later inducted into the Professional Football Hall of Fame.

== Death ==
In 1998, he suffered a heart attack at his home in Laconia, New Hampshire and died shortly afterwards.

== NBA career statistics ==
Legend
GP	Games played	MPG	Minutes per game
FG%	Field-goal percentage	FT%	Free-throw percentage
RPG	Rebounds per game	APG	Assists per game
PPG	Points per game	**Bold**	Career high

=== Regular season ===
Year	Team	GP	FG%	FT%	RPG	APG	PPG
1949–50	Boston	**56**	**.372**	.853	–	0.7	**8.8**
1950–51	New York	30	.344	**.854**	2.0	**0.8**	3.3
Career		86	.367	.853	2.0	0.7	6.9

=== Playoffs ===
Year	Team	GP	FG%	FT%	RPG	APG	PPG
1951	New York	2	.200	1.000	0.5	0.5	2.0
Career		2	.200	1.000	0.5	0.5	2.0
