= Tom Kelly (basketball) =

American basketball player

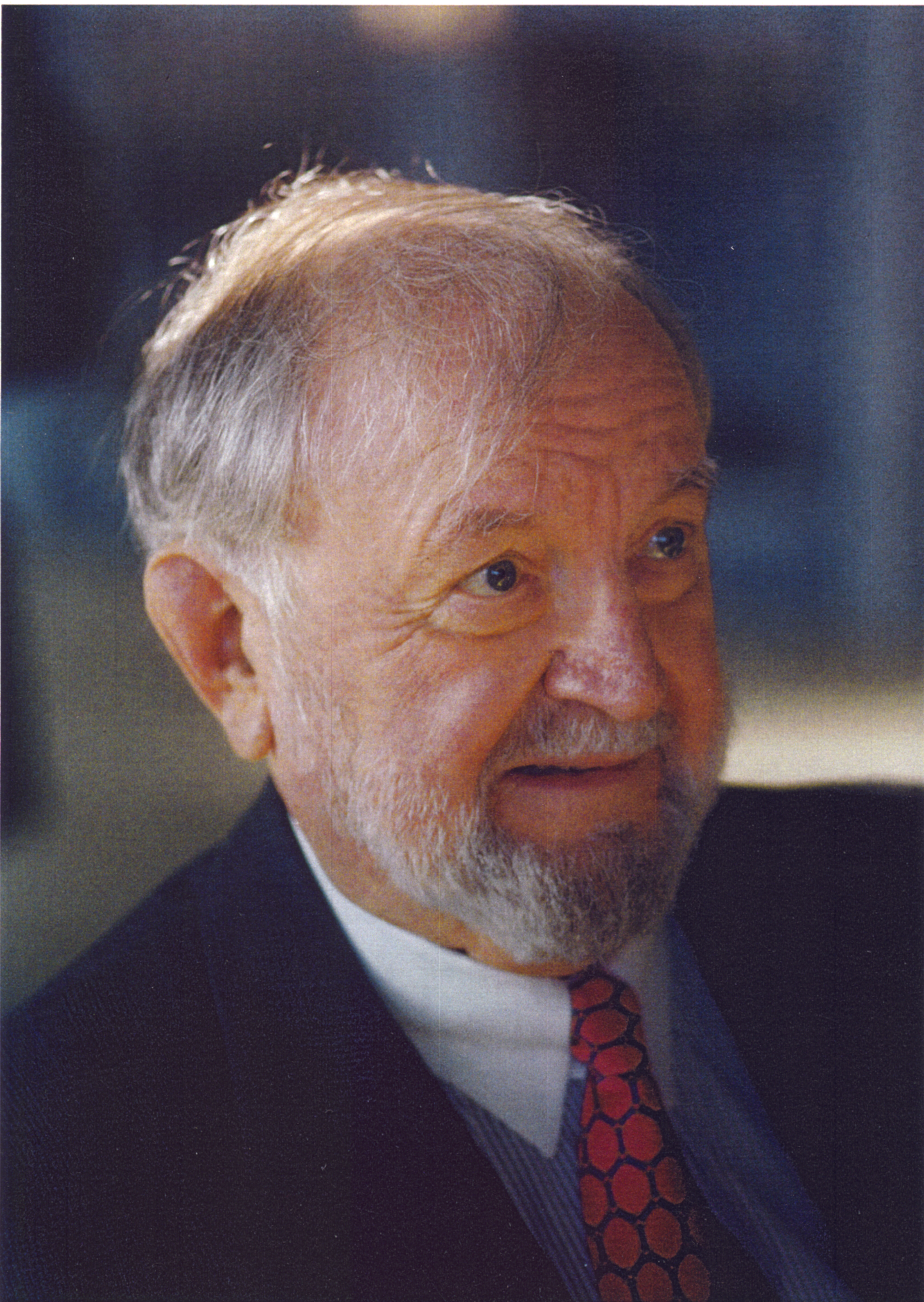
- Kelly in 2004

Personal information
- Born: March 5, 1924 New York City, New York
- Died: March 20, 2008 (aged 84) Santa Barbara, California
- Listed height: 6 ft 0 in (1.83 m)
- Listed weight: 170 lb (77 kg)

Career information
- High school: Regis (New York City, New York)
- College: NYU (1946–1948)
- BAA draft: 1948: 4th round, 39th overall pick
- Drafted by: Boston Celtics
- Playing career: 1948–1949
- Position: Guard
- Number: 6

Career history
- 1948–1949: Boston Celtics
- Stats at NBA.com
- Stats at Basketball Reference

Thomas Edward Kelly (March 5, 1924 – March 20, 2008) was an American professional basketball player. After playing one season with the Boston Celtics of the Basketball Association of America (BAA), Kelly retired and became an engineer.

== Early life ==
Thomas Edward Kelly was born at the New York Medical College, New York City, on March 5, 1924, to Edward Thomas Kelly, a New York City Alderman, and Anastasia Cecilia Kane. In 1929, the family moved to St. Francis Xavier Parish in the Bronx.

Kelly earned an academic scholarship to Regis High School, where he played basketball and graduated in 1941.

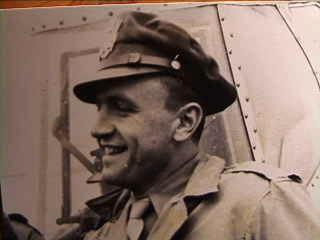
Kelly while stationed in England during World War II.

In 1942, at age 18, Kelly joined the United States Army Air Forces as an Aviation Cadet. He was trained in the United States Army Air Corps as a B-17 flying officer and commissioned a Second Lieutenant Pilot in 1944, assigned to the 486th Bombardment Group (Heavy), 833rd Bomber Squadron of the 3rd Division of the U.S. Eighth Air Force, stationed in Sudbury, Suffolk, England. Kelly flew twenty-nine combat missions over Germany, winning five battle stars and the air medal with oak leaf clusters.

After leaving the military, Kelly attended New York University's Bronx campus on the G.I. Bill, graduating after three years in 1948 with an engineering degree. He was a member of Tau Beta Pi, the engineering school equivalent of Phi Beta Kappa.

While at NYU, he won a spot on the basketball team as a walk-on, joining such nationally recognized athletes as Dolph Schayes, Ray Lumpp, Sid Tannenbaum, and Frank Mangiapane. At NYU, Kelly was All-Metropolitan basketball forward on the team that reached the National Invitation Tournament (NIT) final game in 1948. In 1991, Kelly was inducted into the Athletics Hall of Fame at NYU.

== Professional basketball career ==
Kelly postponed his engineering career when he was drafted by the Boston Celtics in the Basketball Association of America (BAA) and farmed out to the Hartford Hurricanes in their American Basketball League. After leading the league in scoring, he was recalled to the Celtics and was high scorer in their victory over the Fort Wayne Pistons and labeled by the Boston sports media as a contender for "Rookie of the Year". He played 27 games in his one-season, 1948–1949, with the Celtics.

== Engineering career ==
After Kelly retired from basketball, he had a four-decades career building a successful business in commercial heating, ventilating and air conditioning sales in New York City, Long Island, and Westchester County.

Beginning in 1954, Kelly lived for several years in Syosset, Long Island, where he served as vice president and then President of the Board of Education for Central School District No. 2. As Board president, he was instrumental in the construction of Syosset High School, the first modern centrally air conditioned high school on Long Island.

In the late 1950s he assumed management of the New York office of the Trane Company and lived in Shippan Point, Stamford, Connecticut. He retired to Santa Barbara, California, in 1993.

== Private life ==
In 1947, Kelly married Irene McGuire, a Bronx native, at Our Lady's Chapel in St. Patrick's Cathedral, New York. After her death, Kelly married his second wife, Joanie.

Over the course of his active life, Kelly was an avid golfer, sailor and tennis player. He was a member of the Birnam Wood Golf Club, the Stamford Yacht Club and the New York Athletic Club.

Kelly died in Santa Barbara, California, on March 20, 2008. He was survived by his second wife and six sons and four daughters.

== BAA career statistics ==
Legend
GP	Games played
FG%	Field-goal percentage
FT%	Free-throw percentage
APG	Assists per game
PPG	Points per game

=== Regular season ===
Year	Team	GP	FG%	FT%	APG	PPG
1948–49	Boston	27	.335	.616	1.4	7.1
Career		27	.335	.616	1.4	7.1
