= Robert T. Curran =

American basketball and baseball coach

Personal information
- Born: September 29, 1921 Worcester, Massachusetts, U.S.
- Died: October 18, 1977 (aged 56)

Career information
- College: Holy Cross
- BAA draft: 1948: 7th round, 74th overall pick
- Drafted by: Boston Celtics
- Position: Guard

Career history

Coaching
- 1952–1959: UMass

Career highlights
- NCAA champion (1947)
- Stats at Basketball Reference

Robert T. Curran (September 29, 1921 – October 18, 1977) was an American college baseball and basketball coach. He was head basketball coach at the University of Massachusetts from 1952 to 1959 and head baseball coach at the College of the Holy Cross from 1967 to 1970.

Curran was a multi-sport star from Worcester, Massachusetts who enrolled at the College of the Holy Cross in 1940. After spending a few years in the United States military during World War II, he re-enrolled at Holy Cross and was the starting center on the Crusaders' 1946–47 national championship team. He was a key contributor for the team, most notably by successfully defending Oklahoma All-American Gerry Tucker in the NCAA championship game. Curran also played baseball for the Crusaders.

Curran became head coach at the University of Massachusetts in 1952. He coached the Redmen for seven seasons, compiling a record of 81–80 (.503). He later became an assistant men's basketball and baseball coach at his alma mater and was served head baseball coach for four seasons, from 1967 to 1970, going 37–41–2 (.475). Curran died in 1977.

Curran was named to the Holy Cross athletic hall of fame as well as the New England basketball hall of fame. In 2011, Holy Cross established the Robert T. Curran Leadership Award for the baseball program to honor the leadership displayed by Curran as head coach.
