= Bulbs Ehlers =

American basketball, football, and baseball player

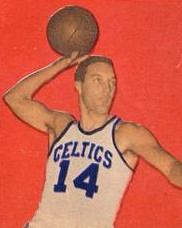
- Ehlers in 1948

Personal information
- Born: March 10, 1923 Joliet, Illinois, U.S.
- Died: June 17, 2013 (aged 90) South Bend, Indiana, U.S.
- Listed height: 6 ft 3 in (1.91 m)
- Listed weight: 198 lb (90 kg)

Career information
- High school: South Bend Central (South Bend, Indiana)
- College: Purdue (1942–1943, 1946–1947)
- BAA draft: 1947: 1st round, 3rd overall pick
- Drafted by: Boston Celtics
- Playing career: 1947–1949
- Position: Shooting Guard
- Number: 14

Career history
- 1947–1949: Boston Celtics

Career BAA statistics
- Points: 800 (8.1 ppg)
- Rebounds: Not recorded
- Assists: 177 (1.8 apg)
- Stats at NBA.com
- Stats at Basketball Reference

Edwin Sheffield "Bulbs" Ehlers (March 10, 1923 – June 17, 2013) was an American professional basketball player. Standing 6 ft 3 in (1.91 m) and weighing 198 pounds (90 kg), he played the Shooting Guard positions. Ehlers was drafted third overall in the inaugural 1947 BAA draft by the Boston Celtics. In two seasons in the league, both with the Celtics, Ehlers averaged 8.1 points per game.

Though born in Joliet, Illinois; Ehlers was raised South Bend, Indiana and attended South Bend Central High School. While there, he played basketball for future Hall of Fame player and coach John Wooden. Ehlers attended Purdue University, lettering for the Boilermakers in three sports; basketball, football, and baseball.

In addition to being the Celtics' first ever draft pick, the National Football League's Chicago Bears selected him in the 31st round (293rd overall) in the 1947 NFL draft. The New York Yankees of Major League Baseball also signed him. He spent five seasons playing minor league baseball: three seasons with the Yankees and two with the Chicago Cubs. He spent the majority of his career at the AAA level, playing for such teams as the Kansas City Blues, Newark Bears and the Springfield Cubs.

Bulbs Ehlers was the father of NFL player Tom Ehlers; his granddaughters, Emily and Jessica, played intercollegiate volleyball at Purdue University and Campbell University respectively. His grandson, Scott Dreisbach, played football at the University of Michigan and spent several seasons in the NFL and the AFL.

He is unique in being a member of both the Indiana Basketball Hall of Fame and the Indiana Football Hall of Fame; he was inducted into the basketball hall in 1980, and the football hall in 1985.

== BAA career statistics ==
Legend
GP	Games played	APG	Assists per game
FG%	Field-goal percentage	PPG	Points per game
FT%	Free-throw percentage	**Bold**	Career high

=== Regular season ===
Year	Team	GP	FG%	FT%	APG	PPG
1947–48	Boston	40	.249	.542	1.1	7.2
1948–49	Boston	**59**	**.312**	**.667**	**2.3**	**8.7**
Career		99	.286	.618	1.8	8.1
