= Dermie O'Connell =

American basketball player

Personal information
- Born: April 13, 1928 New York City, New York, U.S.
- Died: October 5, 1988 (aged 60)
- Listed height: 6 ft 0 in (1.83 m)
- Listed weight: 174 lb (79 kg)

Career information
- High school: Cardinal Hayes (Bronx, New York)
- College: Holy Cross (1945–1949)
- BAA draft: 1949: undrafted
- Playing career: 1949–1950
- Position: Guard
- Number: 7, 9

Career history
- 1949–1950: Boston Celtics
- 1950: St. Louis Bombers
- 1951: Utica Pros

Career highlights
- NCAA champion (1947)
- Stats at NBA.com
- Stats at Basketball Reference

Dermott F. O'Connell (April 13, 1928 – October 5, 1988) was an American professional basketball player.

A 6'0" guard from the College of the Holy Cross, O'Connell played two seasons (1948–1950) in the National Basketball Association as a member of the Boston Celtics and St. Louis Bombers. He averaged 5.8 points per game in his NBA career.

== BAA/NBA career statistics ==
Legend
GP	Games played	FG%	Field-goal percentage
FT%	Free-throw percentage	APG	Assists per game
PPG	Points per game	**Bold**	Career high

=== Regular season ===
Year	Team	GP	FG%	FT%	APG	PPG
1948–49	Boston	21	**.276**	.536	**3.1**	**9.7**
1949–50	Boston	**37**	.262	**.569**	1.7	4.8
1949–50	St. Louis	24	.260	.452	1.1	3.8
Career		82	.268	.531	1.9	5.8
