= Bob Cope (basketball) =

American basketball player and coach

Biographical details
- Born: July 17, 1928; Missoula, Montana, U.S.
- Died: November 28, 2001 (aged 73); Missoula, Montana, U.S.

Playing career
- 1946–1950: Montana
- Position: Center

Coaching career (HC unless noted)
- ?–1964: Southwestern College
- 1965–1968: Montana (assistant)
- 1968–1970: Montana

Accomplishments and honors

Awards
- Third-team All-American – Helms (1948)

Robert D. Cope (July 17, 1928 – November 28, 2001) was an American college basketball player and coach from the University of Montana.

Cope grew up in Missoula, Montana. a 6'3" center, he played for Missoula County High School, where he led the team to the 1946 state title. He opted to stay close to home, attending the University of Montana and playing basketball from 1946 to 1950. Cope was an excellent scorer, finishing his career with 1,808 points and earning third-team All-American honors from the Helms Athletic Foundation in 1948.

Cope later turned to coaching, first at Southwestern College in California, until he resigned due to illness. He then moved to his alma mater, first as an assistant for five seasons, then as head coach from 1968 to 1970. He compiled a record of 13–34 in the two seasons. Cope died in Missoula on November 28, 2001.

== Head coaching record ==
Record table
Season	Team	Overall	Conference	Standing	Postseason
Montana Grizzlies (Big Sky Conference) (1968–1970)
1968–69	Montana	9–17			
1969–70	Montana	8–17			
Montana:		17–34 (.333)			
Total:		17–34 (.333)			
National champion Postseason invitational champion Conference regular season champion Conference regular season and conference tournament champion Division regular season champion Division regular season and conference tournament champion Conference tournament champion
