= Johnny Bach =

American basketball player and coach (1924–2016)

Personal information
- Born: July 10, 1924 Brooklyn, New York, U.S.
- Died: January 18, 2016 (aged 91) Chicago, Illinois, U.S.
- Listed height: 6 ft 2 in (1.88 m)
- Listed weight: 180 lb (82 kg)

Career information
- High school: St. John's Preparatory (New York City, New York)
- College: Fordham (1943–1947)
- BAA draft: 1948: 2nd round, 15th overall pick
- Drafted by: Boston Celtics
- Playing career: 1948–1950
- Position: Small forward / shooting guard
- Number: 17
- Coaching career: 1950–2006

Career history

Playing
- 1948–1949: Boston Celtics
- 1949–1950: Hartford Hurricanes

Coaching
- 1950–1968: Fordham
- 1968–1978: Penn State
- 1979–1983: Golden State Warriors (assistant)
- 1980: Golden State Warriors (interim)
- 1983–1986: Golden State Warriors
- 1986–1994: Chicago Bulls (assistant)
- 1994–1996: Charlotte Hornets (assistant)
- 1996–1998: Detroit Pistons (assistant)
- 2001–2003: Washington Wizards (assistant)
- 2003–2006: Chicago Bulls (assistant)

Career highlights
- As Assistant Coach: 3× NBA champion (1991–1993)

Career BAA statistics
- Points: 119 (3.5 ppg)
- Assists: 25 (0.7 apg)
- Games played: 34
- Stats at NBA.com
- Stats at Basketball Reference

John William Bach (July 10, 1924 – January 18, 2016) was an American professional basketball player and coach. A swingman, Bach played college basketball at Fordham University and Brown University. He was selected by the Boston Celtics in the 1948 Basketball Association of America (BAA) Draft, and played 34 games for the Celtics.

== Career ==
In 1950, at age 26, Bach became one of the nation's youngest head coaches at a major college when he took over the coaching job at Fordham. He spent 18 years there, taking seven Ram teams to post-season tourneys. From 1968 to 1978, he coached at Penn State, where he joined three old friends from Brown–Rip Engle, Joe Paterno and Joe McMullen. Although he led the Nittany Lions to five winning seasons, he would never reach the postseason.

Bach would later coach the Golden State Warriors for three years. He served as an interim coach in 1980, and then as the full-time coach from 1983 to 1986. In 1986, Bach joined the Chicago Bulls as an assistant and became the architect of the "Doberman defense", the aggressive defensive effort led by Michael Jordan, Scottie Pippen, and Horace Grant. After the team won three championships from 1991 to 1993, Bach moved on to coaching jobs with the Charlotte Hornets, Detroit Pistons and Washington Wizards. His stint with the Wizards reunited him with Michael Jordan. He returned to the Bulls in 2003, and retired in 2006.

== Later life ==
After retiring from basketball, Bach turned to painting. In 2007, thirty-two of his watercolors were put on display at the Sevan Gallery in Skokie, Illinois.

== Death ==
Bach died on January 18, 2016, in Chicago at the age of 91. Bach's funeral was held two days later on January 20, 2016, at the Old St. Patrick's Church in Chicago. As a World War II US Navy Ensign he was buried at Abraham Lincoln National Cemetery in Elwood, Illinois.

== BAA career statistics ==
Legend
GP	Games played
FG%	Field-goal percentage
FT%	Free-throw percentage
APG	Assists per game
PPG	Points per game

=== Regular season ===
Year	Team	GP	FG%	FT%	APG	PPG
1948–49	Boston	34	.286	.680	.7	3.5
Career		34	.286	.680	.7	3.5

== Head coaching record ==
=== College basketball ===
Record table
Season	Team	Overall	Conference	Standing	Postseason
Fordham Rams (Metropolitan New York Conference) (1950–1963)
1950–51	Fordham	20–8	3–3	2nd	
1951–52	Fordham	20–8	3–3	4th	
1952–53	Fordham	19–8	4–2	3rd	NCAA First Round
1953–54	Fordham	18–6	3–1	2nd	NCAA First Round
1954–55	Fordham	18–9	3–2	3rd	
1955–56	Fordham	11–14	2–2	6th	
1956–57	Fordham	16–10	2–2	T–3rd	
1957–58	Fordham	16–9	1–3	6th	NIT Quarterfinals
1958–59	Fordham	17–8	2–2	T–4th	NIT First Round
1959–60	Fordham	8–18	1–3	5th	
1960–61	Fordham	7–16	0–3	7th	
1961–62	Fordham	10–14	1–3	T–5th	
1962–63	Fordham	18–8	4–1	1st	NIT First Round
Fordham Rams (Independent) (1963–1968)
1963–64	Fordham	9–11			
1964–65	Fordham	15–12			NIT First Round
1965–66	Fordham	10–15			
1966–67	Fordham	11–14			
1967–68	Fordham	19–8			NIT Quarterfinals
Fordham:		265–193 (.579)	29–30 (.492)		
Penn State Nittany Lions (Independent) (1968–1976)
1968–69	Penn State	13–9			
1969–70	Penn State	13–11			
1970–71	Penn State	10–12			
1971–72	Penn State	17–8			
1972–73	Penn State	15–8			
1973–74	Penn State	14–12			
1974–75	Penn State	11–12			
1975–76	Penn State	10–15			
Penn State Nittany Lions (Eastern 8) (1976–1978)
1976–77	Penn State	11–15	5–5	T–1st	
1977–78	Penn State	8–19	4–6	T–2nd	
Penn State:		122–121 (.502)	9–11 (.450)		
Total:		387–314(.552)			
National champion Postseason invitational champion Conference regular season champion Conference regular season and conference tournament champion Division regular season champion Division regular season and conference tournament champion Conference tournament champion

=== Professional basketball ===
Legend
Regular season	G	Games coached	W	Games won	L	Games lost	W–L %	Win–loss %
Playoffs	PG	Playoff games	PW	Playoff wins	PL	Playoff losses	PW–L %	Playoff win–loss %

Team	Year	G	W	L	W–L%	Finish	PG	PW	PL	PW–L%	Result
GSW	1979–80	21	6	15	.286	6th in Pacific	-	-	-	-	Missed Playoffs
GSW	1983–84	82	37	45	.451	5th in Pacific	-	-	-	-	Missed Playoffs
GSW	1984–85	82	22	60	.268	6th in Pacific	-	-	-	-	Missed Playoffs
GSW	1985–86	82	30	52	.366	6th in Pacific	-	-	-	-	Missed Playoffs
Career		267	95	172	.356		-	-	-	.-	
