= Gene Stump =

American basketball player

Personal information
- Born: August 9, 1925 Blue Island, Illinois, U.S.
- Died: c. 2014 (aged 88–89)
- Listed height: 6 ft 2 in (1.88 m)
- Listed weight: 185 lb (84 kg)

Career information
- High school: St. Rita of Cascia (Chicago, Illinois)
- College: DePaul (1945–1947)
- NBA draft: 1947: -- round, --
- Drafted by: Boston Celtics
- Playing career: 1947–1950
- Position: Forward / guard
- Number: 13, 12, 8, 9

Career history
- 1947–1949: Boston Celtics
- 1949: Minneapolis Lakers
- 1949–1950: Waterloo Hawks

Career BAA/NBA statistics
- Points: 783 (5.3 ppg)
- Assists: 118 (0.8 apg)
- Stats at NBA.com
- Stats at Basketball Reference

Eugene Andrew Stump (August 9, 1925 – c. 2014) was an American professional basketball player. Stump was selected in the 1947 BAA Draft by the Boston Celtics after a collegiate career at DePaul. He played for the Celtics, Minneapolis Lakers and Waterloo Hawks in his three-year BAA/NBA career.

Stump had nine children. His death was listed in the Fall 2014 edition of DePaul Magazine.

== BAA/NBA career statistics ==
Legend
GP	Games played	FG%	Field-goal percentage
FT%	Free-throw percentage	APG	Assists per game
PPG	Points per game	**Bold**	Career high

=== Regular season ===
Year	Team	GP	FG%	FT%	APG	PPG
1947–48	Boston	43	.239	.632	.4	3.3
1948–49	Boston	**56**	**.333**	.713	**1.0**	**8.5**
1949–50	Minneapolis	23	.284	.500	**1.0**	2.7
1949–50	Waterloo	26	.305	**.750**	.8	3.9
Career		148	.303	.692	.8	5.3

=== Playoffs ===
Year	Team	GP	FG%	FT%	APG	PPG
1948	Boston	3	.333	.000	.0	.7
Career		3	.333	.000	.0	.7
