= Phil Stephens =

Australian rules footballer

Personal information
- Full name: Philip Roy Stephens
- Nickname: Horse
- Born: 31 July 1935
- Died: 31 December 2015 (aged 80)
- Original team: North Launceston
- Height: 188 cm (6 ft 2 in)
- Weight: 86 kg (190 lb)

Playing career^{1}
| Years | Club | Games (Goals) |
| 1959 | St Kilda | 6 (2) |
- ^{1} Playing statistics correct to the end of 1959.

Phil Stephens (31 July 1935 – 31 December 2015) was a former Australian rules footballer who played with St Kilda in the Victorian Football League (VFL).
