= Ken Reeves (meteorologist) =

American meteorologist (1961–2012)

- Born: Kenneth W. Reeves; May 22, 1961; Philadelphia, Pennsylvania
- Died: March 25, 2012 (aged 50); State College, Pennsylvania
- Education: Pennsylvania State University (B.S. Meteorology, 1983)
- Occupation: TV weather meteorologist
- Years active: 1983–2012
- Spouse: Raychel Harvey-Jones (m. 2011)

Kenneth W. Reeves (May 22, 1961 – March 25, 2012) was a meteorologist with the American media company AccuWeather.

== Life and career ==
Reeves was born in Philadelphia, Pennsylvania to Frank H. Reeves and Arlette Espenshade Reeves; he had a brother and a sister. While at Abington High School, he studied meteorology at the Franklin Institute; in 1983 he earned a B.S. in the subject from Pennsylvania State University.

He went to work for AccuWeather immediately after graduating, and rose to become head of the information-technology department, then manager of forecasting operations; at his death he was a vice president, general manager of the company's television network, and senior meteorologist. He also played roles in creating the company's AccuData database and in partnering with other forecasting agencies to increase accuracy.

== Private life and death ==
Reeves met his wife Raychel Harvey-Jones in 2008, and they married on October 1, 2011.

On March 25, 2012, Reeves was taking down Christmas lights at his house in Lemont, Pennsylvania, and fell from the roof, suffering head trauma. He was pronounced dead at Mount Nittany Medical Center.

== Memorial ==
A scholarship for undergraduate students in meteorology, established in 2004 by the National Weather Association, was renamed the Ken Reeves Memorial AccuWeather Undergraduate Scholarship in Meteorology in his honor.
