= George Hauptfuhrer =

American basketball player (1926–2013)

Personal information
- Born: August 1, 1926 Abington Township, Pennsylvania, U.S.
- Died: August 2, 2013 (aged 87) Vero Beach, Florida, U.S.
- Listed height: 6 ft 3 in (1.91 m)

Career information
- High school: William Penn Charter (Philadelphia, Pennsylvania)
- College: Louisville (1944–1946); Harvard (1946–1948)
- BAA draft: 1948: 1st round, 3rd overall pick
- Drafted by: Boston Celtics
- Position: Center

Career highlights
- First-team All-Ivy League (1948); No. 13 honored by Louisville Cardinals
- Stats at Basketball Reference

George Jost Hauptfuhrer Jr. (August 1, 1926 – August 2, 2013) was an American basketball player who, despite being taken third overall in the 1948 BAA Draft after a collegiate career at Louisville and Harvard, decided to pursue a career in law.

Hauptfuhrer grew up in Philadelphia, Pennsylvania, and attended William Penn Charter School. He then enrolled at Louisville, where he played center on the basketball team for two seasons; while attending, he was in a Navy training program. Hauptfuhrer transferred to Harvard for his final two years of college; while there, he played on the football, basketball, and track and field teams. He was named an all-Ivy League selection in basketball during his senior year in 1947–48.

In just the second-ever Basketball Association of America draft, Hauptfuhrer was selected third overall by the Boston Celtics. Instead of pursuing a professional basketball career, he enrolled at the University of Pennsylvania Law School and became a lawyer.
