= Murray Mitchell =

American basketball player (1923–2013)

Personal information
- Born: March 19, 1923 Huntsville, Texas, U.S.
- Died: June 11, 2013 (aged 90) Portland, Texas, U.S.
- Listed height: 6 ft 6 in (1.98 m)

Career information
- High school: Huntsville (Huntsville, Texas)
- College: Sam Houston State (1941–1943, 1946–1948)
- BAA draft: 1948: 5th round, 51st overall pick
- Drafted by: Boston Celtics
- Position: Center

Career history
- 1949: Anderson Packers

Career highlights
- 3× All-Lone Star Conference (1942, 1947, 1948)
- Stats at NBA.com
- Stats at Basketball Reference

Murray Cooper Mitchell (March 19, 1923 – June 11, 2013) was an American professional basketball player.

He played college basketball for Sam Houston State where he was a three time All-Lone Star Conference first team member. His college career was interrupted by World War II where he served in Europe. Following the war, he returned to Sam Houston. During the 1946–47 season, he set a conference scoring record with 285 points in 12 games.

After his collegiate career, Mitchell was selected in the 1948 BAA Draft by the Boston Celtics. In August 1949, he signed with the Anderson Packers where he appeared in two games, averaging 1.0 point and 1.0 assist per contest. He died in 2013.

== Career statistics ==
Legend
GP	Games played	GS	Games started	MPG	Minutes per game
FG%	Field goal percentage	3P%	3-point field goal percentage	FT%	Free throw percentage
RPG	Rebounds per game	APG	Assists per game	SPG	Steals per game
BPG	Blocks per game	PPG	Points per game	**Bold**	Career high

=== NBA ===
==== Regular season ====
Year	Team	GP	FG%	FT%	APG	PPG
1949–50	Anderson	2	.333	–	1.0	1.0
