= 1948 BAA draft =

Basketball player selection

General information
- Sport: Basketball
- Date: May 10, 1948
- Location: Morrison Hotel (Chicago, Illinois)

Overview
- 113 total selections in 15 rounds
- League: BAA
- Teams: 8
- First selection: Andy Tonkovich, Providence Steamrollers
- Hall of Famers: 4: F Dolph Schayes; G Bobby Wanzer; F Harry Gallatin; C Neil Johnston

The 1948 BAA draft was the second annual draft of the Basketball Association of America (BAA), which later merged with the National Basketball League (NBL) to become the National Basketball Association (NBA). The draft was held on May 10, 1948, before the 1948–49 season. In this draft, eight BAA teams along with four teams who moved from the NBL, took turns selecting amateur U.S. college basketball players. Originally, this BAA draft was meant to be a joint draft venture with the NBL similar to what had meant to occur in the BAA's inaugural league draft (as well as what the National Football League would later do in the late 1960s with the American Football League). However, on May 9, the day before the draft was meant to begin for both leagues, the Tri-Cities Blackhawks (who were a part of the NBL at the time) would sign consensus All-American prospect and NCAA scoring champion Murray Wier from the University of Iowa, which caused BAA commissioner Maurice Podoloff to object to the Blackhawks' early signing attempt and endangered what was already a strenuously held truce between the two leagues. Before the draft officially began on May 10, the Minneapolis Lakers, Rochester Royals, Fort Wayne Zollner Pistons, and Indianapolis Kautskys announced they were leaving the NBL for the BAA (albeit with the Fort Wayne team officially dropping the "Zollner" part of the Pistons name and the Indianapolis team renaming the Kautskys to the Indianapolis Jets in order for both of them to be admitted in since the BAA did not allow for teams to promote local businesses as team names); the desertion of those four NBL teams led to the planned joint draft to be withdrawn on the NBL's end and subsequently led to the NBL breaking off all relations with the BAA at the time. As such, each league would conduct their own draft instead, with the BAA officially selecting 113 collegiate players and the NBL being slated to have chosen 125 total collegiate players themselves.

== Draft selections and draftee career notes ==
Due to what could be seen as last-minute additions for this BAA draft by having four teams from the rivaling National Basketball League joining their league in time for entry into the BAA draft (as opposed to utilizing a combined BAA-NBL draft between the two leagues as they had originally planned for at the time), the BAA would have to work in the four new teams that they had just acquired into the draft system where they had the other eight teams already set beforehand. In the case of the Indianapolis franchise that joined (going from the Kautskys to the Jets), despite them (barely) being an NBL playoff team in their final season in that league, their 24–35 record would cause them to have the #2 pick of the draft due to it being behind every other BAA team that season outside of the lowly Providence Steamrollers (with the Boston Celtics having a 20–28 record that previous season being a better overall win percentage by comparison). As for the other three NBL-turned-BAA franchises in Fort Wayne, Minneapolis, and Rochester, they would each obtain the eighth, ninth, and tenth overall picks due to their overall records that previous season being better than every other team in the BAA, though with the caveat of having the BAA's division champions in the Philadelphia Warriors (Eastern) and Washington Capitols (Western) holding the eleventh and twelfth picks in the first round respectively instead.

Andy Tonkovich from Marshall University was selected first overall by the Providence Steamrollers. Four of the first round picks, George Kok, George Hauptfuhrer, Bob Gale and Chuck Hanger, never played in the BAA. Four players from this draft, Harry Gallatin, Dolph Schayes, Bobby Wanzer and Alex Hannum have been inducted into the Basketball Hall of Fame. Interestingly, the first round selection of Bobby Wanzer by the Rochester Royals could be considered a cheating selection for the franchise's first ever draft pick in the BAA/NBA since Wanzer had previously played for the Royals in the 1947–48 season back when they were a part of the rivaling National Basketball League. However, it was agreed between the Royals and the BAA that the Rochester franchise could either waive their territorial draft pick rights or their regular draft turn in order for them to retain Wanzer, with the Royals deciding to waive their territorial draft pick rights in order to retain Wanzer onto their team for good.

== Draft ==
Pos.	G	F	C
Position	Guard	Forward	Center

^	Denotes player who has been inducted to the Naismith Memorial Basketball Hall of Fame
^{+}	Denotes player who has been selected for at least one All-Star Game
^{#}	Denotes player who has never appeared in an NBA regular-season or playoff game

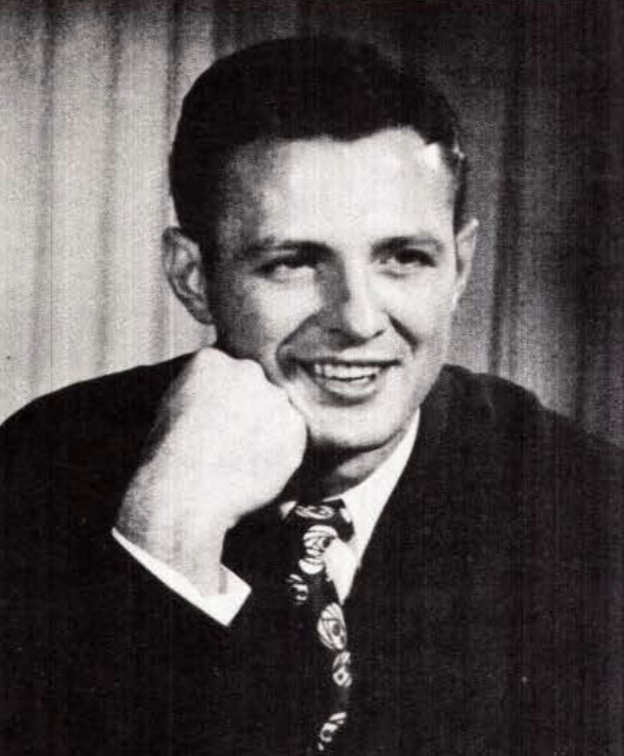
Andy Tonkovich was the first overall pick by the Providence Steamrollers.

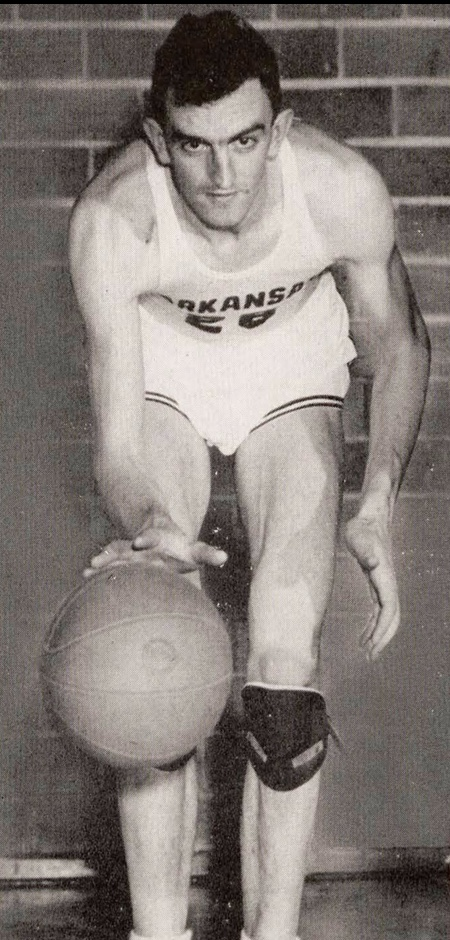
George Kok was selected second overall by the Indianapolis Jets.

Rnd.	Pick	Player	Pos.	Nationality (Note: Nationality indicates the player's national team or representative nationality. If a player has not competed at the international level, then the nationality indicates the national team which the player is eligible to represent according to FIBA rules.)	Team	School / club team
1	1	Andy Tonkovich	G	United States	Providence Steamrollers	Marshall
1	2	George Kok^{#}	C	United States	Indianapolis Jets	Arkansas
1	3	George Hauptfuhrer^{#}	C	United States	Boston Celtics	Harvard
1	4	Dolph Schayes^	F/C	United States	New York Knicks	NYU
1	5	Ed Mikan	F/C	United States	Chicago Stags	DePaul
1	6	Walt Budko	F/C	United States	Baltimore Bullets	Columbia
1	7	Bob Gale^{#}	G/F	United States	St. Louis Bombers	Cornell
1	8	Ward Williams	F	United States	Fort Wayne Pistons	Indiana
1	9	Chuck Hanger^{#}	–	United States	Minneapolis Lakers	California
1	10	Bobby Wanzer^	G	United States	Rochester Royals	Rochester Royals (NBL)
1	11	Don Ray	F/C	United States	Philadelphia Warriors	Western Kentucky
1	12	Jack Nichols	F/C	United States	Washington Capitols	Washington

== Other picks ==
The following list includes other draft picks who have appeared in at least one BAA/NBA game.

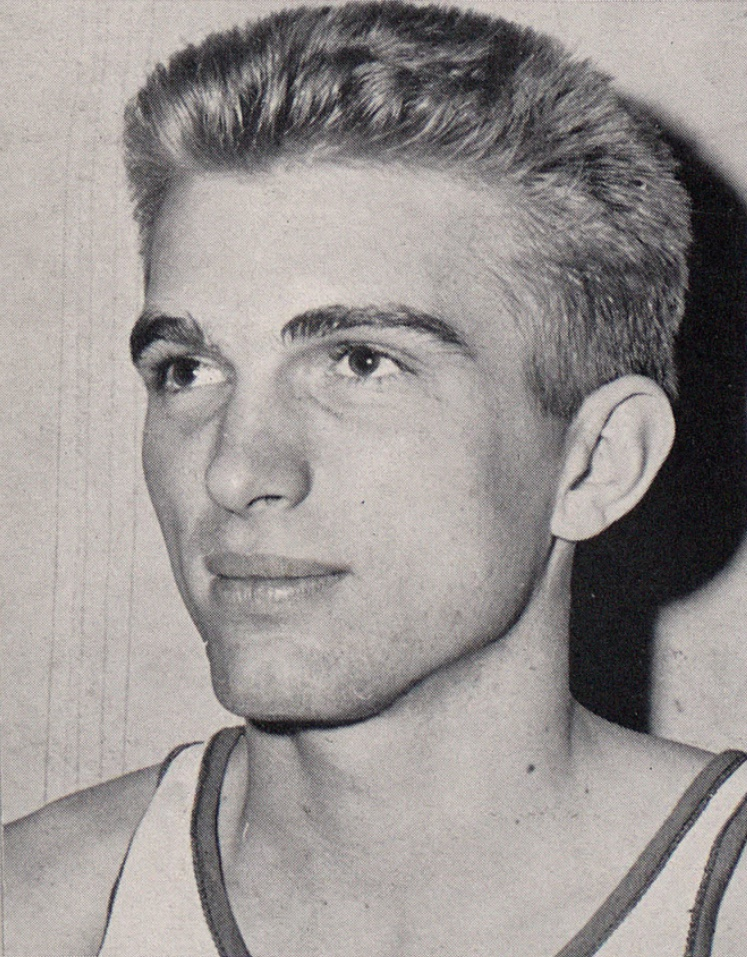
Arnie Ferrin was selected by the Minneapolis Lakers.

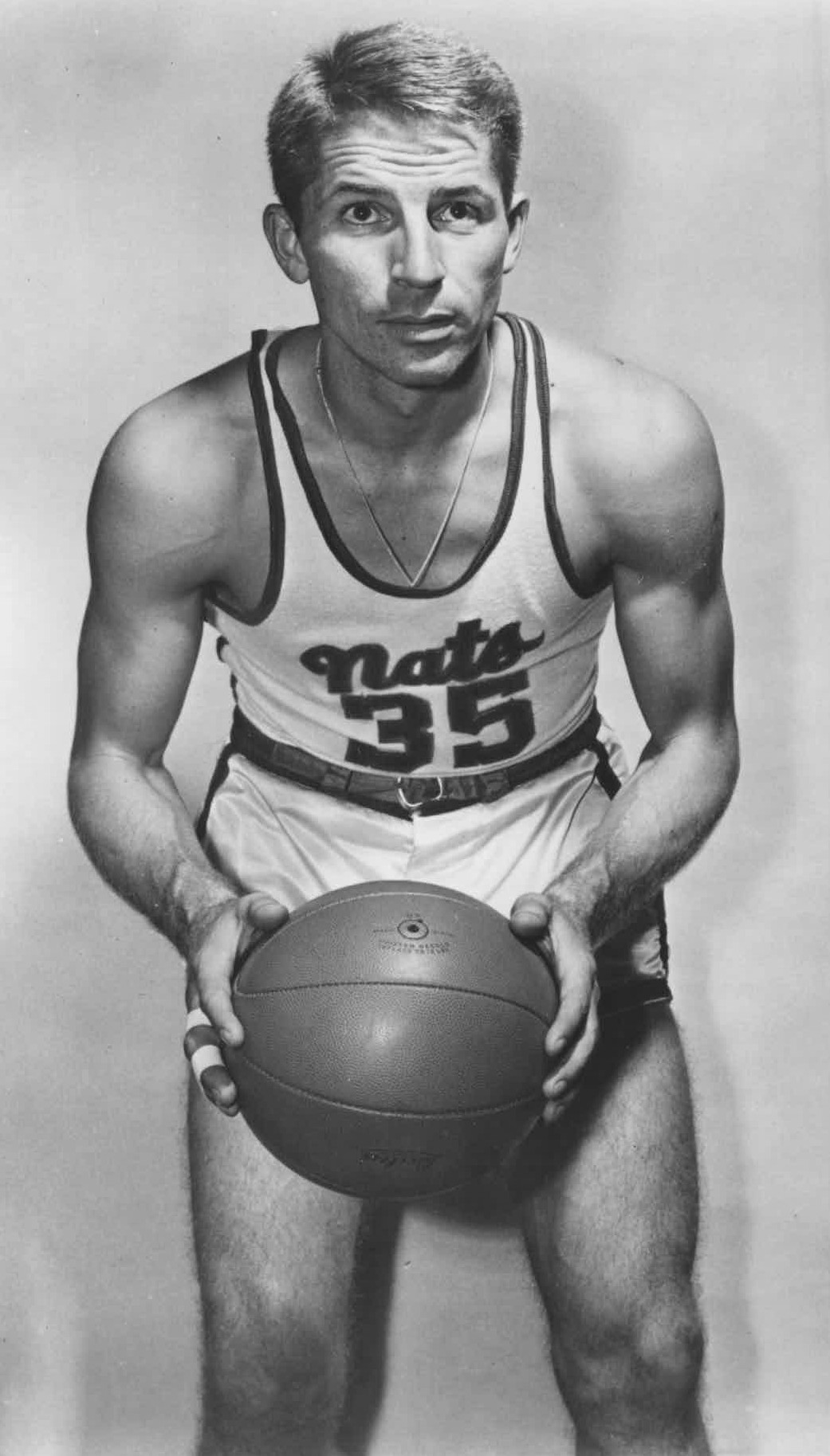
Billy Gabor was selected by the Rochester Royals.

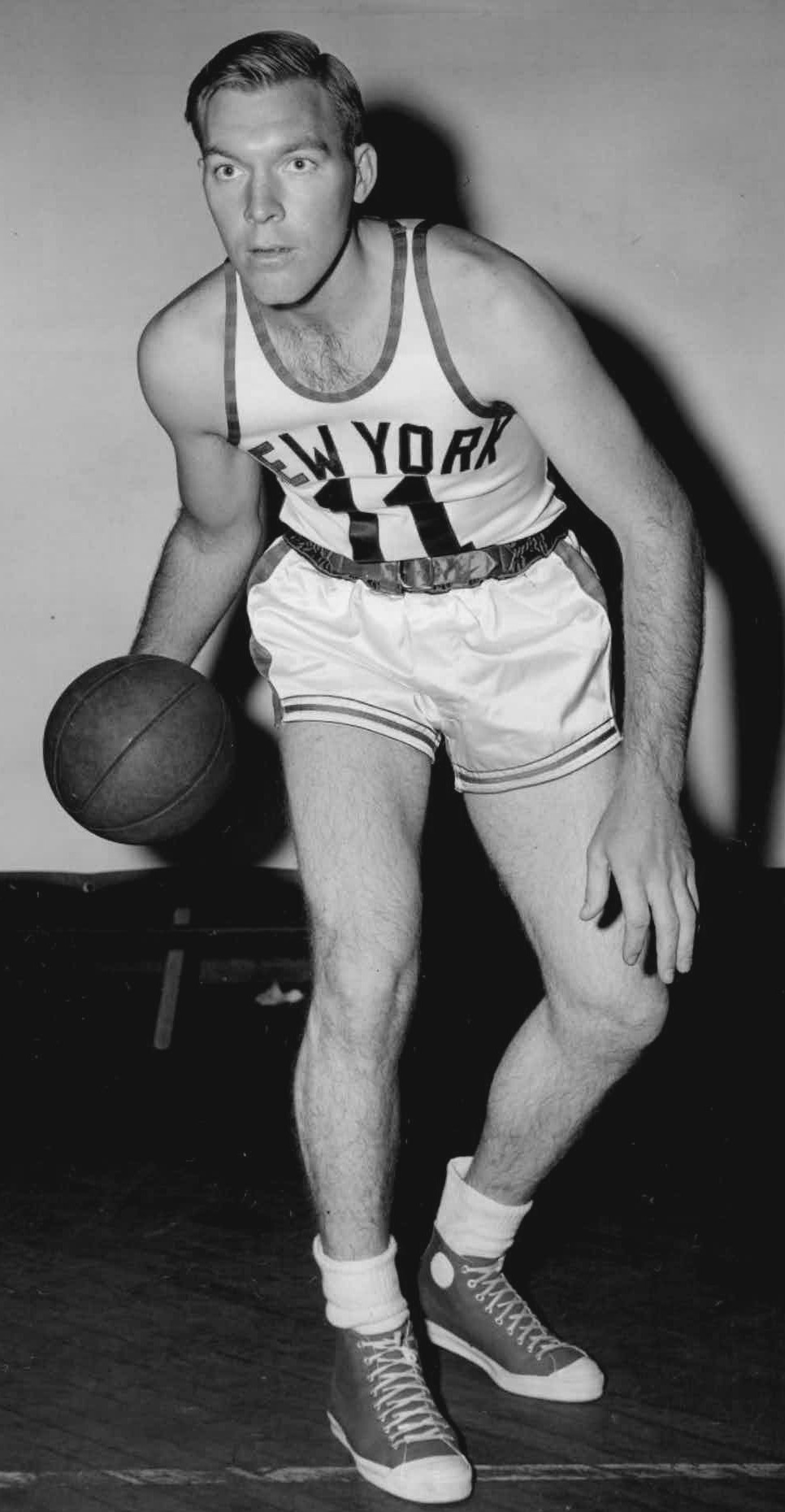
Future Hall of Famer Harry Gallatin was selected by the New York Knicks.

Rnd.	Pick	Player	Pos.	Nationality	Team	School / club team
–	–	Johnny Bach	G/F	United States	Boston Celtics	Fordham
–	–	Gene Berce	G/F	United States	New York Knicks	Marquette
–	–	Darrell Brown	F	United States	Baltimore Bullets	Humboldt State
–	–	Jack Burmaster	G	United States	St. Louis Bombers	Illinois
–	–	Jake Carter	F/C	United States	Baltimore Bullets	East Texas State
–	–	Jack Coleman^{+}	F/C	United States	Providence Steamrollers	Louisville
–	–	Bobby Cook	G	United States	Fort Wayne Pistons	Wisconsin
–	–	Hook Dillon	F	United States	Chicago Stags	North Carolina
–	–	Arnie Ferrin	G/F	United States	Minneapolis Lakers	Utah
–	–	Bill Gabor^{+}	G/F	United States	Rochester Royals	Syracuse
–	–	Harry Gallatin^	F/C	United States	New York Knicks	Northeast Missouri
–	–	Earl Gardner	F	United States	Minneapolis Lakers	DePauw
–	–	Dee Gibson	G/F	United States	Minneapolis Lakers	Western Kentucky
–	–	Alex Hannum	F/C	United States	Indianapolis Jets	USC
–	–	Marshall Hawkins	F	United States	Boston Celtics	Tennessee
–	–	Joe Holland	F	United States	Baltimore Bullets	Kentucky
–	–	Whitey Kachan	G	United States	Chicago Stags	DePaul
–	–	Leo Katkaveck	G	United States	Washington Capitols	NC State
–	–	Tom Kelly	G	United States	Boston Celtics	NYU
–	–	Andy Kostecka	F	United States	Indianapolis Jets	Georgetown
–	–	Dan Kraus	G	United States	Baltimore Bullets	Georgetown
–	–	Herb Krautblatt	G	United States	Baltimore Bullets	Rider
–	–	Leo Kubiak	G/F	United States	Rochester Royals	Bowling Green
–	–	Ray Lumpp	G	United States	Indianapolis Jets	NYU
–	–	Johnny Macknowski	F	United States	Rochester Royals	Seton Hall
–	–	Mel McGaha	G	United States	New York Knicks	Arkansas
–	–	Murray Mitchell	C	United States	Boston Celtics	Sam Houston State
–	–	Johnny Orr	F	United States	Minneapolis Lakers	Beloit
–	–	Easy Parham	G/F	United States	St. Louis Bombers	Texas Wesleyan
–	–	Jack Parkinson	G	United States	Washington Capitols	Kentucky
–	–	Ed Peterson	C	United States	New York Knicks	Cornell
–	–	Roy Pugh	F/C	United States	Philadelphia Warriors	SMU
–	–	Tex Ritter	G	United States	New York Knicks	Eastern Kentucky
–	–	Kenny Rollins	G	United States	Fort Wayne Pistons	Kentucky
–	–	Dick Shrider	G	United States	New York Knicks	Ohio
–	–	Odie Spears	G	United States	Chicago Stags	Western Kentucky
–	–	Brady Walker	F/C	United States	Providence Steamrollers	BYU
–	–	Dick Wehr	F	United States	Indianapolis Jets	Rice
–	–	Murray Wier	G	United States	Fort Wayne Pistons	Iowa
–	–	D. C. Wilcutt	G	United States	St. Louis Bombers	Saint Louis

== Notable undrafted players ==
These players were not selected in the 1948 draft but played at least one game in the BAA/NBA.

Player	Pos.	Nationality	School/club team
Don Asmonga	G	United States	Alliance (So.)
Jake Bornheimer	PF/C	United States	Muhlenberg (So.)
Bob Brannum	PF/C	United States	Michigan State (Jr.)
Jim Browne	C	United States	Tilden Tech (Illinois) (HS Sr.)
Joe Colone	SF	United States	Bloomsburg State (Sr.)
Jack Cotton	PF/C	United States	Wyoming (Sr.)
Dillard Crocker	SG/SF	United States	Western Michigan (Fr.)
Ray Ellefson	PF/C	United States	Oklahoma A&M (Sr.)
Jack Eskridge	PF/C	United States	Kansas (Jr.)
Phil Farbman	PG	United States	CCNY (Sr.)
Donnie Forman	PG	United States	NYU (Sr.)
Joe Graboski	PF/C	United States	Tuley (Illinois) (HS Sr.)
John Hazen	PG	United States	Indiana State (So.)
Gene James	SF/PF	United States	Marshall (Jr.)
Neil Johnston^	C	United States	Ohio State (So.)
Lionel Malamed	PG	United States	CCNY (Sr.)
Jack McCloskey	PG	United States	Penn (Sr.)
Bill Miller	SG/SF	United States	North Carolina (So.)
Dave Minor	G	United States	UCLA (Jr.)
Dermie O'Connell	PG	United States	Holy Cross (So.)
Fred Paine	SF	United States	Westminster (Pennsylvania) (Sr.)
Jim Spruill	SG	United States	Rice (Sr.)

== See also ==
- List of first overall NBA draft picks
- NBA records
