= Minnesota Golden Gophers men's basketball statistical leaders =

The Minnesota Golden Gophers men's basketball statistical leaders are individual statistical leaders of the Minnesota Golden Gophers men's basketball program in various categories, including points, three-pointers, assists, blocks, rebounds, and steals. Within those areas, the lists identify single-game, single-season, and career leaders. The Golden Gophers represent the University of Minnesota in the NCAA's Big Ten Conference.

Minnesota began competing in intercollegiate basketball in 1896. However, the school's record book does not generally list records from before the 1950s, as records from before this period are often incomplete and inconsistent. Since scoring was much lower in this era, and teams played much fewer games during a typical season, it is likely that few or no players from this era would appear on these lists anyway.

The NCAA did not officially record assists as a stat until the 1983–84 season, and blocks and steals until the 1985–86 season, but Minnesota's record books includes players in these stats before these seasons. These lists are updated through the end of the 2021–22 season.

== Scoring ==
Career
Rk	Player	Points	Seasons
1	Mychal Thompson	1,992	1974-75 1975-76 1976-77 1977-78
2	Jordan Murphy	1,802	2015-16 2016-17 2017-18 2018-19
3	Willie Burton	1,800	1986-87 1987-88 1988-89 1989-90
4	Randy Breuer	1,777	1979-80 1980-81 1981-82 1982-83
5	Andre Hollins	1,765	2011-12 2012-13 2013-14 2014-15
6	Nate Mason	1,731	2014-15 2015-16 2016-17 2017-18
7	Sam Jacobson	1,709	1994-95 1995-96 1996-97 1997-98
8	Kevin McHale	1,704	1976-77 1977-78 1978-79 1979-80
9	Quincy Lewis	1,614	1995-96 1996-97 1997-98 1998-99
10	Dawson Garcia	1,557	2022–23 2023–24 2024–25

Season
Rk	Player	Points	Season
1	Mychal Thompson	647	1975-76
2	Kris Humphries	629	2003–04
3	Cade Tyson	628	2025–26
4	Quincy Lewis	625	1998-99
5	Daniel Oturu	623	2019-20
6	Willie Burton	616	1989-90
7	Dawson Garcia	614	2024–25
8	Amir Coffey	599	2018–19
9	Tom Kondla	597	1966-67
10	Mychal Thompson	595	1976-77

Single game
Rk	Player	Points	Season	Opponent
1	Oliver Shannon	42	1970-71	Wisconsin
	Eric Magdanz	42	1961-62	Michigan
3	Marcus Carr	41	2020–21	Nebraska
	Andre Hollins	41	2012–13	Memphis
5	George Kline	40	1956-57	Iowa
6	Ron Johnson	39	1958-59	Ohio State
	Jamison Battle	39	2021–22	Maryland
8	Archie Clark	38	1965-66	Detroit
	George Kline	38	1957-58	Wisconsin
	Maynard Johnson	38	1950-51	Colorado
	Cade Tyson	38	2025–26	Texas Southern

== Rebounds ==
Career
Rk	Player	Rebounds	Seasons
1	Jordan Murphy	1,307	2015-16 2016-17 2017-18 2018-19
2	Mychal Thompson	956	1974-75 1975-76 1976-77 1977-78
3	Kevin McHale	950	1976-77 1977-78 1978-79 1979-80
4	Jim Brewer	907	1970-71 1971-72 1972-73
5	Richard Coffey	904	1986-87 1987-88 1988-89 1989-90
6	Mel Northway	841	1962-63 1963-64 1964-65
7	Ron Johnson	820	1957-58 1958-59 1959-60
8	Randy Carter	736	1990-91 1991-92 1992-93 1993-94
9	Larry Mikan	735	1967-68 1968-69 1969-70
10	Dusty Rychart	732	1998-99 1999-00 2000-01 2001-02

Season
Rk	Player	Rebounds	Season
1	Jordan Murphy	397	2018-19
2	Jordan Murphy	361	2017-18
3	Larry Mikan	349	1969-70
	Daniel Oturu	349	2019-20
5	Jim Brewer	331	1970-71
6	Trevor Mbakwe	327	2010-11
7	Mel Northway	321	1964-65
8	Mychal Thompson	312	1975-76
9	Jim Brewer	301	1972-73
10	Jordan Murphy	300	2016-17

Single game
Rk	Player	Rebounds	Season	Opponent
1	Larry Mikan	28	1969-70	Michigan
2	Ron Johnson	27	1957-58	North Carolina
3	Dennis Dvoracek	24	1965-66	Wisconsin
4	Tom Kondla	23	1966-67	Kansas State
5	Thomas McGrann	22	1960-61	Michigan State
	Jim Brewer	22	1971-72	Marquette
7	Jordan Murphy	21	2018-19	Penn State
	Jordan Murphy	21	2016-17	Michigan State
	Melvin Northway	21	1964-65	Wisconsin

== Assists ==
Career
Rk	Player	Assists	Seasons
1	Arriel McDonald	547	1990-91 1991-92 1992-93 1993-94
2	Nate Mason	512	2014-15 2015-16 2016-17 2017-18
3	Kevin Burleson	440	1999-00 2000-01 2001-02 2002-03
4	Al Nolen	394	2007-08 2008-09 2009-10 2010-11
5	Marc Wilson	375	1982-83 1983-84 1984-85 1985-86
6	Melvin Newbern	369	1987-88 1988-89 1989-90
7	Andre Hollins	359	2011-12 2012-13 2013-14 2014-15
8	Marcus Carr	348	2019-20 2020-21
9	Dupree McBrayer	332	2015-16 2016-17 2017-18 2018-19
10	Kevin Lynch	301	1987-88 1988-89 1989-90 1990-91

Season
Rk	Player	Assists	Season
1	Elijah Hawkins	247	2023-24
2	Marcus Carr	207	2019-20
3	Ta'lon Cooper	196	2022–23
4	Arriel McDonald	179	1993-94
5	Nate Mason	169	2016-17
6	Melvin Newbern	167	1989-90
7	Ray Williams	166	1976-77
8	DeAndre Mathieu	160	2013-14
	Kevin Burleson	160	2002-03
10	Langston Reynolds	150	2025-26

Single game
Rk	Player	Assists	Season	Opponent
1	Elijah Hawkins	17	2023–24	IUPUI
2	Arriel McDonald	16	1993-94	Wisconsin
3	Elijah Hawkins	15	2023–24	Butler
4	Isaiah Washington	13	2018-19	North Florida
	Melvin Newbern	13	1989-90	Iowa
	Arriel McDonald	13	1993-94	Iowa
	Langston Reynolds	13	2025–26	Northwestern
8	Elijah Hawkins	12	2023–24	Illinois
	Ta'Lon Cooper	12	2022–23	Nebraska
	Marcus Carr	12	2019-20	Michigan
	Nate Mason	12	2015-16	Purdue
	Adam Boone	12	2005-06	South Dakota State
	Arriel McDonald	12	1993-94	Iowa
	Marc Wilson	12	1985-86	West Virginia State

== Steals ==
Career
Rk	Player	Steals	Seasons
1	Melvin Newbern	215	1987-88 1988-89 1989-90
2	Austin Hollins	213	2010-11 2011-12 2012-13 2013-14
3	Al Nolen	205	2007-08 2008-09 2009-10 2010-11
4	Damian Johnson	195	2006-07 2007-08 2008-09 2009-10
5	Quincy Lewis	179	1995-96 1996-97 1997-98 1998-99
6	Trent Tucker	164	1978-79 1979-80 1980-81 1981-82
7	Nate Mason	129	2014-15 2015-16 2016-17 2017-18
8	Arriel McDonald	163	1990-91 1991-92 1992-93 1993-94
9	Kevin Burleson	160	1999-00 2000-01 2001-02 2002-03
10	Darryl Mitchell	153	1978-79 1979-80 1980-81 1981-82

Season
Rk	Player	Steals	Season
1	Melvin Newbern	101	1988-89
2	Austin Hollins	75	2013-14
	Travarus Bennett	75	2001-02
4	Melvin Newbern	72	1989-90
5	Quincy Lewis	68	1997-98
6	DeAndre Mathieu	64	2014-15
	Damian Johnson	64	2009-10
	Al Nolen	64	2008-09
	Al Nolen	64	2007-08
10	Vincent Grier	63	2004-05
	Trent Tucker	63	1980-81

Single game
Rk	Player	Steals	Season	Opponent
1	Melvin Newbern	9	1989-90	Rider College
2	Carlos Morris	8	2014-15	Wake Forest
	Melvin Newbern	8	1988-89	Michigan State
	Darryl Mitchell	8	1980-81	Wisconsin
5	Vincent Grier	7	2005-06	Oral Roberts
	Kevin Burleson	7	2002-03	Bethune Cookman
	Arriel McDonald	7	1992-93	Northwestern
	Melvin Newbern	7	1988-89	Purdue
	Melvin Newbern	7	1986-87	Ball State
10	Elijah Hawkins	6	2023-24	Maryland
	Nate Mason	6	2014-15	Seattle
	DeAndre Mathieu	6	2014-15	Seattle
	Nate Mason	6	2014-15	North Dakota
	Austin Hollins	6	2012-13	Memphis
	Julian Welch	6	2011-12	Iowa
	Al Nolen	6	2010-11	Siena
	Al Nolen	6	2009-10	Utah Valley
	Damian Johnson	6	2009-10	Tennessee Tech
	Dan Coleman	6	2007-08	Santa Clara
	Rico Tucker	6	2005-06	Coastal Carolina
	Kevin Burleson	6	2002-03	Penn State
	Travarus Bennett	6	2001-02	Northwestern
	Kevin Burleson	6	2000-01	Indiana
	Sam Jacobson	6	1996-97	Alabama State
	Kevin Lynch	6	1989-90	Purdue
	Melvin Newbern	6	1988-89	Indiana

== Blocks ==
Career
Rk	Player	Blocks	Seasons
1	Kevin McHale	235	1976-77 1977-78 1978-79 1979-80
2	Randy Breuer	229	1979-80 1980-81 1981-82 1982-83
3	Ralph Sampson III	203	2008-09 2009-10 2010-11 2011-12
4	Damian Johnson	191	2006-07 2007-08 2008-09 2009-10
5	Reggie Lynch	180	2016-17 2017-18
6	Joel Przybilla	165	1998-99 1999-00
7	Michael Bauer	157	1999-00 2000-01 2001-02 2003-04 2003-04
8	Jeff Hagen	153	2000-01 2002-03 2003-04 2004-05
9	Elliott Eliason	151	2011-12 2012-13 2013-14 2014-15
10	Mychal Thompson	150	1974-75 1975-76 1976-77 1977-78

Season
Rk	Player	Blocks	Season
1	Reggie Lynch	114	2016-17
2	Randy Breuer	87	1982-83
3	Joel Przybilla	84	1998-99
	Kevin McHale	84	1979-80
5	Joel Przybilla	81	1999-00
6	Jeff Hagen	80	2004-05
7	Randy Breuer	76	1981-82
	Daniel Oturu	76	2019-20
9	Elliott Eliason	72	2013-14
10	Damian Johnson	67	2009-10

Single game
Rk	Player	Blocks	Season	Opponent
1	Mychal Thompson	12	1975-76	Ohio State
2	Reggie Lynch	11	2016-17	Penn State
3	Joel Przybilla	10	1998-99	Fresno State
4	Reggie Lynch	9	2017-18	Niagara
	Reggie Lynch	9	2016-17	St. John's
	Colton Iverson	9	2008-09	Bowling Green
	Joel Przybilla	9	1999-00	UT-Arlington
	Randy Breuer	9	1982-83	Michigan
9	Joel Przybilla	8	1998-99	Michigan State
	Mychal Thompson	8	1975-76	Purdue
