= List of 2006–07 NBA season transactions =

The following is a list of all team-to-team transactions that have occurred in the National Basketball Association during the 2006–07 NBA season. It lists what team each player has been traded to, signed by, or claimed by, and for which players or draft picks, if applicable.

== Retirement ==
Date	Name	Team(s) played (years)	Age	Notes	Ref.
June 20	Corie Blount	Chicago Bulls (1993–1995, 2002–2004); Los Angeles Lakers (1995–1999); Cleveland Cavaliers (1999); Phoenix Suns (1999–2001); Golden State Warriors (2001); Philadelphia 76ers (2001–2002); Toronto Raptors (2004)	37		
October 27	Brian Grant	Phoenix Suns (1994–1997), Portland Trail Blazers (1997–2000); Miami Heat (2000–2004); Los Angeles Lakers (2004–2005); Phoenix Suns (2005–2006)	34	Retired due to injuries.	
November 13	Vin Baker	Milwaukee Bucks (1993–1997); Seattle SuperSonics (1997–2002); Boston Celtics (2002–2004); New York Knicks (2004–2005); Houston Rockets (2005); Los Angeles Clippers (2006)	34	Was waived by the Timberwolves the same day.	
February 19	Doug Christie	Los Angeles Lakers (1992–1994), New York Knicks (1994–1995); Toronto Raptors (1995–2000); Sacramento Kings (2000–2005); Orlando Magic (2004–2005); Dallas Mavericks (2005–2006); Los Angeles Clippers (2006–2007)	37	Second retirement.	
June 1	Kenny Anderson	New Jersey Nets (1991–1996), Charlotte Hornets (1996); Portland Trail Blazers (1996–1998); Boston Celtics (1998–2002); Seattle SuperSonics (2002–2003); New Orleans Hornets (2003); Indiana Pacers (2003–2004); Atlanta Hawks (2004–2005); Los Angeles Clippers (2005)	36	Became head coach of the Atlanta Krunk of the CBA.	

== Trades ==
June
June 8	To Toronto Raptors: Kris Humphries; Robert Whaley	To Utah Jazz: Rafael Araujo
June 21	To Toronto Raptors: Radoslav Nesterović	To San Antonio Spurs: Matt Bonner; Eric Williams; 2009 second-round pick
June 28	To Phoenix Suns: 2007 first-round pick	To Boston Celtics: Brian Grant; Draft rights to Rajon Rondo
June 28	To San Antonio Spurs: 2007 second-round pick	To Milwaukee Bucks: Draft rights to Damir Markota
July
July 12	To Memphis Grizzlies: Stromile Swift; Draft rights to Rudy Gay	To Houston Rockets: Shane Battier
July 12	To Utah Jazz: Derek Fisher	To Golden State Warriors: Devin Brown; Keith McLeod; Andre Owens
July 12	To Indiana Pacers: Marquis Daniels	To Dallas Mavericks: Austin Croshere
July 12	To Indiana Pacers: Draft rights to Andrew Betts	To New Orleans / Oklahoma City Hornets: Peja Stojaković
July 14	To New Orleans / Oklahoma City Hornets: Tyson Chandler	To Chicago Bulls: P. J. Brown; J. R. Smith
July 14	To New Orleans / Oklahoma City Hornets: 2008 second-round pick	To Houston Rockets: Kirk Snyder; 2008 second-round pick
July 20	To Denver Nuggets: J. R. Smith	To Chicago Bulls: Howard Eisley; Two 2007 second-round picks
July 24	To Dallas Mavericks: Anthony Johnson	To Indiana Pacers: Darrell Armstrong; Rawle Marshall; Josh Powell
July 27	To New Jersey Nets: Mikki Moore	To Seattle SuperSonics: 2009 second-round pick
July 31	To Portland Trail Blazers: Jamaal Magloire	To Milwaukee Bucks: Steve Blake; Ha Seung-jin; Brian Skinner
August
August 18	To Chicago Bulls: Martynas Andriuškevičius	To Cleveland Cavaliers: Eddie Basden
August 22	To Atlanta Hawks: 2007 first-round pick	To Indiana Pacers: John Edwards; Al Harrington
October
October 13	To Boston Celtics: Luke Jackson; Cash	To Cleveland Cavaliers: Dwayne Jones; Trade exception
December
December 19	To Philadelphia 76ers: Andre Miller; Joe Smith; Two 2007 first-round picks	To Denver Nuggets: Allen Iverson; Ivan McFarlin
January
January 3	To New Jersey Nets: Bernard Robinson	To Charlotte Bobcats: Jeff McInnis; Cash
January 11	To Milwaukee Bucks: Earl Boykins; Julius Hodge; Cash	To Denver Nuggets: Steve Blake
January 16	To Golden State Warriors: Al Harrington; Stephen Jackson; Šarūnas Jasikevičius; Josh Powell	To Indiana Pacers: Ike Diogu; Mike Dunleavy Jr.; Keith McLeod; Troy Murphy
February
February 13	To San Antonio Spurs: Melvin Ely	To Charlotte Bobcats: Eric Williams; Cash; 2009 second-round pick
February 13	To Houston Rockets: Jake Tsakalidis	To Memphis Grizzlies: Scott Padgett
February 22	To Portland Trail Blazers: Fred Jones; Cash	To Toronto Raptors: Juan Dixon
February 22	To Dallas Mavericks: 2007 second-round pick	To Atlanta Hawks: Anthony Johnson

== Free Agency ==
Player	Date signed	New team	Former team
Mike Gansey	July 5	Miami Heat	West Virginia (went undrafted in 2006)
Louis Amundson	July 6	Sacramento Kings	UNLV (went undrafted in 2006)
Sam Cassell	July 12	Los Angeles Clippers	
Willie Green	July 12	Philadelphia 76ers	
Matt Harpring	July 12	Utah Jazz	
D.J. Mbenga	July 12	Dallas Mavericks	
Richard Melzer	July 12	San Antonio Spurs	New Zealand Breakers
Anthony Parker	July 12	Toronto Raptors	Maccabi Tel Aviv (Israel)
Vladimir Radmanović	July 12	Los Angeles Lakers	Los Angeles Clippers
Shavlik Randolph	July 12	Philadelphia 76ers	
Jamar Smith	July 12	San Antonio Spurs	Austin Toros (NBA D-League)
Tim Thomas	July 12	Los Angeles Clippers	Phoenix Suns
Shammond Williams	July 12	Los Angeles Lakers	FC Barcelona (Spain)
Keith Bogans	July 13	Orlando Magic	Houston Rockets
Greg Buckner	July 13	Dallas Mavericks	Denver Nuggets
Speedy Claxton	July 13	Atlanta Hawks	New Orleans Hornets
Jorge Garbajosa	July 13	Toronto Raptors	Unicaja Málaga (Spain)
Mike James	July 13	Minnesota Timberwolves	Toronto Raptors
Eric Piatkowski	July 13	Phoenix Suns	Chicago Bulls
Ben Wallace	July 13	Chicago Bulls	Detroit Pistons
Lindsey Hunter	July 17	Detroit Pistons	
Joel Przybilla	July 17	Portland Trail Blazers	
Flip Murray	July 18	Detroit Pistons	Cleveland Cavaliers
Lindsey Hunter	July 18	Charlotte Bobcats	
Lynn Greer	July 18	Milwaukee Bucks	Carpisa Napoli (Italy)
Nazr Mohammed	July 18	Detroit Pistons	San Antonio Spurs
Othella Harrington	July 19	Charlotte Bobcats	Chicago Bulls (waived on July 6)
Darius Songaila	July 19	Washington Wizards	Chicago Bulls
Jarron Collins	July 20	Utah Jazz	
Nenê	July 20	Denver Nuggets	
Marcus Banks	July 20	Phoenix Suns	Minnesota Timberwolves
Ronald Dupree	July 21	Detroit Pistons	Minnesota Timberwolves
Jackie Butler	July 21	San Antonio Spurs	New York Knicks
John Salmons	July 24	Sacramento Kings	Philadelphia 76ers
Jason Terry	July 25	Dallas Mavericks	
Yakhouba Diawara	July 26	Denver Nuggets	Climamio Bologna
Bobby Jackson	July 26	Denver Nuggets	Memphis Grizzlies
Rasual Butler	July 26	New Orleans Hornets	
Trevor Ariza	July 27	Orlando Magic	New York Knicks
Maceo Baston	July 27	Indiana Pacers	Maccabi Tel Aviv (Israel)
Sean Marks	July 27	Phoenix Suns	San Antonio Spurs
Bernard Robinson	July 27	Charlotte Bobcats	
Kelenna Azubuike	July 28	Houston Rockets	Fort Worth Flyers (D-League)
Adrian Griffin	July 28	Chicago Bulls	Dallas Mavericks
John Lucas III	July 28	Houston Rockets	Tulsa 66ers (D-League)
Jamal Sampson	July 28	Sacramento Kings	Denver Nuggets
Aaron Williams	July 28	Los Angeles Clippers	New Orleans Hornets
Chucky Atkins	July 31	Memphis Grizzlies	
Justin Reed	August 1	Minnesota Timberwolves	
Junior Harrington	August 1	Memphis Grizzlies	Pamesa Valencia
Devean George	August 2	Dallas Mavericks	Los Angeles Lakers
Jimmie Hunter	August 3	Indiana Pacers	
DeShawn Stevenson	August 4	Washington Wizards	Orlando Magic
Jared Jeffries	August 8	New York Knicks	Washington Wizards
Jannero Pargo	August 9	New Orleans Hornets	Chicago Bulls
Clifford Robinson	August 14	New Jersey Nets	
Chris Wilcox	August 15	Seattle SuperSonics	
Loren Woods	August 15	Sacramento Kings	Toronto Raptors
J. J. Barea	August 16	Dallas Mavericks	Northeastern (went undrafted in 2006)
Pat Carroll	August 16	Dallas Mavericks	Saint Joseph's (went undrafted in 2005)
Ndudi Ebi	August 16	Dallas Mavericks	Fort Worth Flyers
Matt Haryasz	August 16	Houston Rockets	Stanford (went undrafted in 2006)
Eddie House	August 16	New Jersey Nets	Phoenix Suns
Bo Outlaw	August 16	Orlando Magic	
Darius Washington	August 16	Dallas Mavericks	Memphis (went undrafted in 2006)
Alonzo Mourning	August 18	Miami Heat	
Scot Pollard	August 18	Cleveland Cavaliers	Indiana Pacers
Jawad Williams	August 24	Miami Heat	Baloncesto Fuenlabrada
Ivan McFarlin	August 26	Philadelphia 76ers	Oklahoma State (went undrafted in 2005)
Jake Voskuhl	August 28	Miami Heat	
Walter Herrmann	August 30	Charlotte Bobcats	Unicaja Málaga
Lorenzen Wright	August 30	Atlanta Hawks	Memphis Grizzlies
Jumaine Jones	August 31	Phoenix Suns	Charlotte Bobcats
Casey Jacobsen	September 5	Houston Rockets	TAU Vitoria
David Wesley	September 5	Cleveland Cavaliers	Houston Rockets
Charles Lee	September 6	San Antonio Spurs	

== Draft ==
The 2006 NBA draft was held on June 28, 2006, at the Theatre in New York City.

=== Round 1 ===
Pick	Player	Date signed	Team signed	School/Club Team
1	Andrea Bargnani	July 1	Toronto Raptors	Italy
2	LaMarcus Aldridge	July 4	Portland Trail Blazers	Texas
3	Adam Morrison	July 3	Charlotte Bobcats	Gonzaga
4	Tyrus Thomas	July 1	Chicago Bulls	LSU
5	Shelden Williams	July 10	Atlanta Hawks	Duke
6	Brandon Roy	July 4	Portland Trail Blazers	Washington
7	Randy Foye	July 1	Minnesota Timberwolves	Villanova
8	Rudy Gay	July 12	Memphis Grizzlies	Connecticut
9	Patrick O'Bryant	July 3	Golden State Warriors	Bradley
10	Mouhamed Sene	July 6	Seattle SuperSonics	Vervier Pepinsters (Belgium)
11	JJ Redick	July 3	Orlando Magic	Duke
12	Hilton Armstrong	July 5	New Orleans/Oklahoma City Hornets	Connecticut
13	Thabo Sefolosha	July 6	Chicago Bulls	Angelico Biella (Italy)
14	Ronnie Brewer	July 7	Utah Jazz	Arkansas
15	Cedric Simmons	July 4	New Orleans/Oklahoma City Hornets	NC State
16	Rodney Carney	July 8	Philadelphia 76ers	Memphis
17	Shawne Williams	July 6	Indiana Pacers	Memphis
18	Oleksiy Pecherov	-	Washington Wizards	Ukraine
19	Quincy Douby	July 3	Sacramento Kings	Rutgers
20	Renaldo Balkman	July 5	New York Knicks	South Carolina
21	Rajon Rondo	July 3	Boston Celtics	Kentucky
22	Marcus Williams	July 11	New Jersey Nets	Connecticut
23	Josh Boone	July 11	New Jersey Nets	Connecticut
24	Kyle Lowry	July 11	Memphis Grizzlies	Villanova
25	Shannon Brown	July 13	Cleveland Cavaliers	Michigan State
26	Jordan Farmar	July 5	Los Angeles Lakers	UCLA
27	Sergio Rodríguez	July 6	Portland Trail Blazers	Spain
28	Maurice Ager	July 1	Dallas Mavericks	Michigan State
29	Mardy Collins	July 5	New York Knicks	Temple
30	Joel Freeland	-	Portland Trail Blazers	England

=== Round 2 ===
Pick	Player	Date signed	Team signed	School/Club Team
31	James White	July 6	Indiana Pacers	Cincinnati
32	Steve Novak	July 26	Houston Rockets	Marquette
33	Solomon Jones	July 13	Atlanta Hawks	South Florida
34	Paul Davis	July 12	Los Angeles Clippers	Michigan State
35	P. J. Tucker	July 25	Toronto Raptors	Texas
36	Craig Smith	August 30	Minnesota Timberwolves	Cincinnati
37	Bobby Jones	July 8	Philadelphia 76ers	Washington
38	Kosta Perović	-	Golden State Warriors	Serbia
39	David Noel	July 3	Milwaukee Bucks	North Carolina
40	Denham Brown	October 2	Seattle SuperSonics	Connecticut
41	James Augustine	July 8	Orlando Magic	Illinois
42	Daniel Gibson	July 7	Cleveland Cavaliers	Texas
43	Marcus Vinicius	October 1	New Orleans/Oklahoma City Hornets	Brazil
44	Lior Eliyahu	-	Houston Rockets	Israel
45	Alexander Johnson	June 17	Memphis Grizzlies	Florida State
46	Dee Brown	August 29	Utah Jazz	Illinois
47	Paul Millsap	August 1	Utah Jazz	Louisiana Tech
48	Vladimir Veremeenko	-	Washington Wizards	Russia
49	Leon Powe	July 14	Boston Celtics	California
50	Ryan Hollins	July 31	Charlotte Bobcats	UCLA
51	Cheikh Samb	-	Detroit Pistons	Senegal
52	Guillermo Diaz	-	Los Angeles Clippers	Miami (FL)
53	Yotam Halperin	-	Seattle SuperSonics	Israel
54	Hassan Adams	September 27	New Jersey Nets	Arizona
55	Ejike Ugboaja	-	Cleveland Cavaliers	Nigeria
56	Edin Bavčić	-	Philadelphia 76ers	Bosnia and Herzegovina
57	Loukas Mavrokefalidis	-	Minnesota Timberwolves	Greece
58	J.R. Pinnock	September 6	Los Angeles Lakers	George Washington
59	Damir Markota	July 25	Milwaukee Bucks	Croatia
60	Will Blalock	July 19	Detroit Pistons	Iowa State

=== Signed Undrafted Players ===
Date	Player	Team	School/Club Team
July 6	Allan Ray	Boston Celtics	Villanova
July 6	Chris Quinn	Miami Heat	Notre Dame
July 6	Lou Amundson	Sacramento Kings	UNLV
July 9	Daniel Horton	Miami Heat	Michigan
July 13	Tarence Kinsey	Memphis Grizzlies	South Carolina

== Released ==
=== Waived ===
Player	Date waived	Former team
Scott Padgett	June 30	New Jersey Nets
Moochie Norris	July 5	New Orleans Hornets
Nikoloz Tskitishvili	July 5	Portland Trail Blazers
Othella Harrington	July 6	Chicago Bulls
Arvydas Macijauskas	July 12	New Orleans Hornets
Andre Barrett	July 13	Toronto Raptors
Will Bynum	July 14	Golden State Warriors
Howard Eisley	July 24	Chicago Bulls
Anthony Roberson	July 25	Memphis Grizzlies
Sergei Monia	July 25	Sacramento Kings
Alvin Williams	July 26	Toronto Raptors
Pavel Podkolzin	August 4	Dallas Mavericks
Zoran Planinić	August 11	New Jersey Nets
Ime Udoka	September 11	New York Knicks
Derek Anderson	September 12	Miami Heat
Mo Taylor	September 29	New York Knicks
Mike Gansey	September 30	Miami Heat
Devin Brown	October 3	Golden State Warriors
Eric Chenowith	October 6	Chicago Bulls
Larry Ayuso	October 8	Denver Nuggets
Jefferson Sobral	October 8	Denver Nuggets
Corey Williams	October 8	Denver Nuggets
Noel Felix	October 9	Seattle SuperSonics
Eddie Basden	October 10	Cleveland Cavaliers
Scott Merritt	October 10	Chicago Bulls
Joe Shipp	October 11	Charlotte Bobcats
Tyler Smith	October 11	Utah Jazz
Frank Steyn	October 11	Utah Jazz
Dijon Thompson	October 11	Golden State Warriors
Marcus Douthit	October 12	Los Angeles Lakers
Jeff Varem	October 13	Chicago Bulls
Kimani Ffriend	October 13	Memphis Grizzlies
Laron Profit	October 13	Memphis Grizzlies
Eugene "Pooh" Jeter	October 13	Sacramento Kings
Peter John Ramos	October 13	Washington Wizards
Brandon Hunter	October 14	Cleveland Cavaliers
Pat Carroll	October 15	Dallas Mavericks
LaVell Blanchard	October 15	Toronto Raptors
Cezary Trybanski	October 15	Toronto Raptors
Courtney Alexander	October 16	Denver Nuggets
Mamadou N'Diaye	October 16	Los Angeles Lakers
Brandon Bowman	October 16	New Jersey Nets
Akin Akingbala	October 19	Boston Celtics
Rob Griffin	October 19	Detroit Pistons
Rick Rickert	October 19	Detroit Pistons
Matt Haryasz	October 19	Houston Rockets
Davin White	October 19	Phoenix Suns
Kevin Pittsnogle	October 20	Boston Celtics
Will Conroy	October 20	Charlotte Bobcats
Donta Smith	October 20	Charlotte Bobcats
Darius Washington	October 20	Dallas Mavericks
Jimmie Hunter	October 20	Indiana Pacers
Sean Lampley	October 20	Indiana Pacers
Olu Famutimi	October 20	San Antonio Spurs
Rich Melzer	October 20	San Antonio Spurs
Jared Reiner	October 20	San Antonio Spurs
Kenny Adeleke	October 20	Seattle SuperSonics
Tyrone Ellis	October 22	Minnesota Timberwolves
Jay Williams	October 22	New Jersey Nets
Paul Shirley	October 22	Phoenix Suns
Lionel Chalmers	October 23	Atlanta Hawks
Kaniel Dickens	October 23	Atlanta Hawks
Stephen Graham	October 24	Cleveland Cavaliers
Kelenna Azubuike	October 24	Houston Rockets
Antonio Burks	October 24	Miami Heat
Daniel Horton	October 24	Miami Heat
Loren Woods	October 24	Sacramento Kings
Anthony Carter	October 25	Denver Nuggets
Antoine Hood	October 25	Denver Nuggets
Mike Harris	October 25	Milwaukee Bucks
Elton Brown	October 25	New York Knicks
Milone Clark	October 25	New York Knicks
Paul Miller	October 25	New York Knicks
Nikoloz Tskitishvili	October 25	New York Knicks
Jackie Manuel	October 25	Orlando Magic
Kasib Powell	October 25	Orlando Magic
Rick Brunson	October 25	Philadelphia 76ers
Zendon Hamilton	October 25	Portland Trail Blazers
Louis Amundson	October 26	Sacramento Kings
Andre Brown	October 26	Atlanta Hawks
Andreas Glyniadakis	October 26	Atlanta Hawks
Denham Brown	October 26	Seattle SuperSonics
Ndudi Ebi	October 26	Dallas Mavericks
Luis Flores	October 26	New Orleans Hornets
Junior Harrington	October 26	Memphis Grizzlies
Ryan Humphrey	October 26	Los Angeles Clippers
Luke Jackson	October 26	Boston Celtics
Charles Lee	October 26	San Antonio Spurs
Scooter McFadgon	October 26	New Orleans Hornets
Lamond Murray	October 26	Los Angeles Clippers
Andre Owens	October 26	Golden State Warriors
Milt Palacino	October 26	Seattle SuperSonics
J.R. Pinnock	October 26	Los Angeles Lakers
DaWan Robinson	October 26	Los Angeles Clippers
Melvin Sanders	October 26	San Antonio Spurs
Ondrej Starosta	October 26	Cleveland Cavaliers
Awvee Story	October 26	New Jersey Nets
Von Wafer	October 26	Los Angeles Lakers
Matt Walsh	October 26	New Jersey Nets
Jawad Williams	October 26	Los Angeles Clippers
Justin Williams	October 26	Sacramento Kings
Ryan Bowen	October 27	Houston Rockets
Brian Grant	October 27	Boston Celtics
Casey Jacobsen	October 27	Houston Rockets
Chris Taft	October 27	Golden State Warriors
Ha Seung-Jin	October 28	Milwaukee Bucks
Luke Schenscher	October 29	Chicago Bulls
Vincent Grier	October 29	Miami Heat
Kevin Burleson	October 30	Charlotte Bobcats
John Edwards	October 30	Indiana Pacers
Hiram Fuller	October 30	Utah Jazz
Devin Green	October 30	Los Angeles Lakers
Mike Hall	October 30	Washington Wizards
Darvin Ham	October 30	New Jersey Nets
Kevinn Pinkney	October 30	Washington Wizards
Jalen Rose	October 30	New York Knicks
James White	October 30	Indiana Pacers
Kareem Rush	November 5	Seattle SuperSonics
Vin Baker	November 13	Minnesota Timberwolves
Brian Chase	November 14	Utah Jazz
DaJuan Wagner	November 20	Golden State Warriors
Alan Anderson	November 26	Charlotte Bobcats
Ivan McFarlin	December 22	Denver Nuggets
Matt Freije	December 26	Atlanta Hawks
Stephen Graham	January 2	Portland Trail Blazers
Cedric Bozeman	January 3	Atlanta Hawks
Chris McCray	January 4	Milwaukee Bucks
Roger Powell	January 4	Utah Jazz
Steven Smith	January 4	Philadelphia 76ers
Desmon Farmer	January 5	Seattle SuperSonics
Andreas Glyniadakis	January 5	Seattle SuperSonics
Anthony Roberson	January 5	Golden State Warriors
Chris Webber	January 10	Philadelphia 76ers
Maurice Taylor	January 23	Sacramento Kings
Eddie Jones	January 30	Memphis Grizzlies
Robert Hite	February 1	Miami Heat
Julius Hodge	February 7	Milwaukee Bucks
Doug Christie	February 15	Los Angeles Clippers (10-day contract terminated early)
James Lang	February 28	Washington Wizards
Jason Hart	March 1	Sacramento Kings
Alan Henderson	March 2	Utah Jazz
Eric Williams	March 16	Charlotte Bobcats
Eddie Griffin	March 17	Minnesota Timberwolves
P. J. Tucker	March 25	Toronto Raptors
Scott Padgett	April 4	Memphis Grizzlies
Željko Rebrača	April 6	Los Angeles Clippers
