= Kelenna Azubuike =

Nigerian-American basketball player (born 1983)

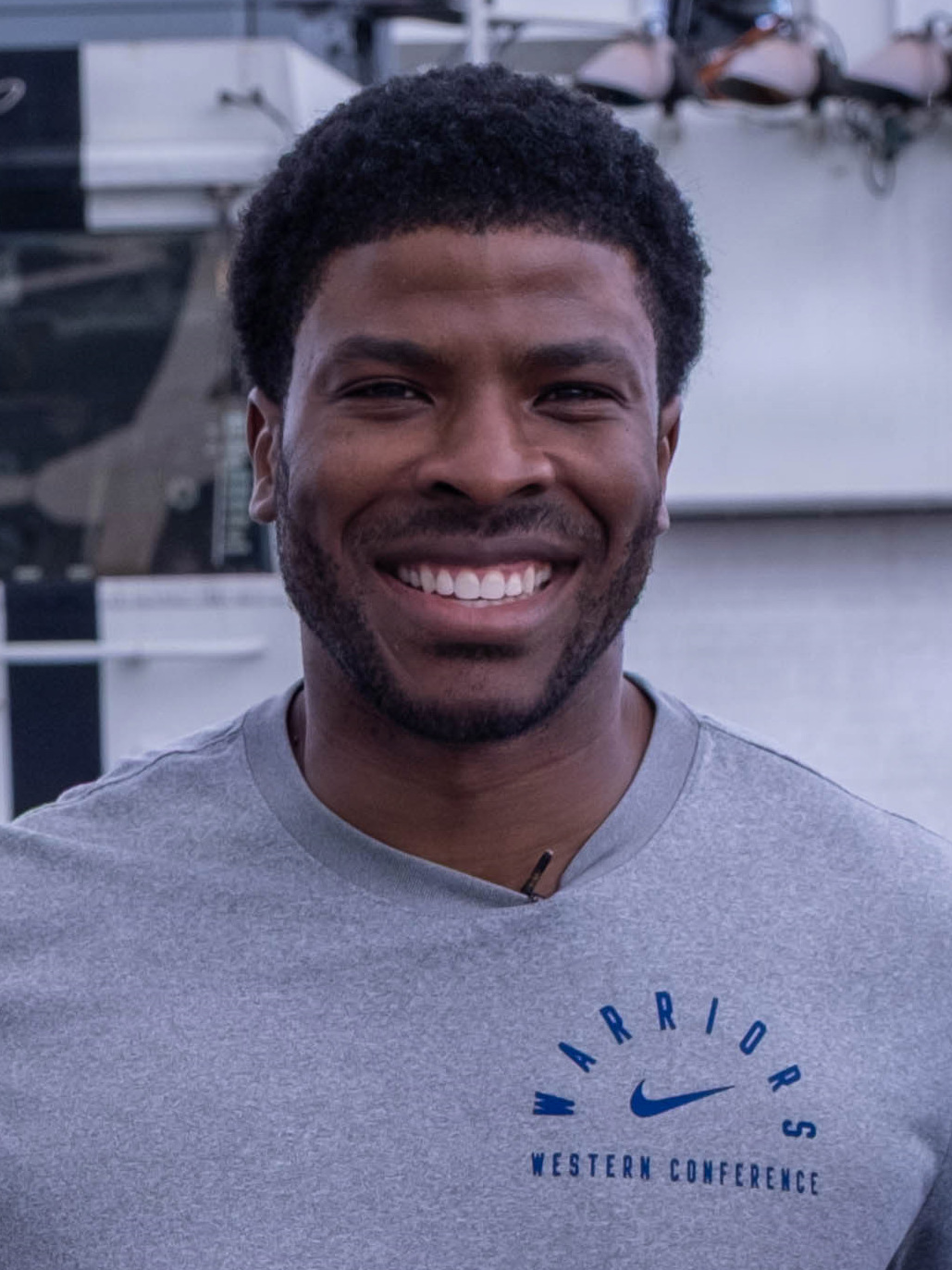
- Azubuke in 2026

Personal information
- Born: 16 December 1983 (age 42) London, England
- Listed height: 6 ft 5 in (1.96 m)
- Listed weight: 215 lb (98 kg)

Career information
- High school: Victory Christian (Tulsa, Oklahoma)
- College: Kentucky (2002–2005)
- NBA draft: 2005: undrafted
- Playing career: 2005–2012
- Position: Shooting guard / small forward
- Number: 7, 4

Career history
- 2005–2007: Fort Worth Flyers
- 2007–2010: Golden State Warriors
- 2012: Dallas Mavericks
- 2012: →Texas Legends

Career highlights
- Second-team All-SEC (2005)

Career NBA statistics
- Points: 2,178 (10.5 ppg)
- Rebounds: 829 (4.0 rpg)
- Assists: 230 (1.1 apg)
- Stats at NBA.com
- Stats at Basketball Reference

Kelenna Azubuike (born 16 December 1983) is a Nigerian-American former professional basketball player and currently the Golden State Warriors television analyst on NBC Sports Bay Area.

Born in London to Nigerian parents, Azubuike moved to the United States as a child. He was raised in Tulsa, Oklahoma, where he became a standout player at Victory Christian High School, and was eventually recruited to play for the Wildcats of the University of Kentucky. After finishing his junior season in college, Azubuike declared himself eligible for the 2005 NBA draft, eventually going undrafted that year. Azubuike then played for the Fort Worth Flyers of the NBA Development League, leading the league in scoring during the 2006–07 season and eventually being called up to play for the Golden State Warriors.

== Early life ==
Azubuike was born in London, England, to Nigerian parents Kenneth and Chi Azubuike. His parents were doctors and had moved to London for work. Azubuike relocated with his family to Tulsa, Oklahoma, in 1989 when his father was offered a fellowship at Saint Francis Hospital; his family became American citizens. Playing for Victory Christian High School, Azubuike led his team to the state title as a sophomore. He eventually became an All-State selection, averaging 39.1 points and 13.3 rebounds and leading his team to the Class 4A State Championship Game as a senior. He was the top scorer in the state of Oklahoma during his last three seasons of high school, averaging 28.5 points as a sophomore and 38.7 points as a junior. Azubuike finished his prep career with 3,530 points, 89 points short of the all-time state scoring mark.

Considered a four-star recruit by Scout.com, Azubuike was listed as the No. 8 small forward and the No. 34 player in the nation in 2002.

== College career ==
Playing under coach Tubby Smith, Azubuike said that the biggest improvement to his game at Kentucky was the ability to create offense through intense defense. As a junior, Azubuike was named to the All-SEC Second Team by the Associated Press and the league's coaches after leading the team and ranking tenth in the SEC in points per game, averaging 14.7 overall. Azubuike was named to the 2005 SEC All-Tournament Team after averaging 18.0 points in three contests. During his time with the organization, Azubuike helped the Wildcats to earn two Southeastern Conference titles, two SEC Tournament titles, and two NCAA Elite Eight appearances. Azubuike averaged 10.0 points and 3.7 rebounds in 97 career games at the University of Kentucky, shooting a 48.5% field goal average for his college career. While attending the University of Kentucky, Azubuike majored in business marketing.

== Professional career ==
=== Fort Worth Flyers (2005–2007) ===
In April 2005, Azubuike announced his plans to enter the draft after his junior year, signing with agent Joel Bell and ending his college eligibility. In the 2005–06 season, Azubuike averaged 12.6 points, 4.0 rebounds, and 1.5 assists in forty-one games with the Fort Worth Flyers of the NBA's Developmental League. Azubuike played with the Denver Nuggets in the 2006 Toshiba Vegas Summer League, where he averaged 16.4 points and finished tied at tenth in the league in scoring. In August 2006, Azubuike was signed by the Houston Rockets as a free agent, but eventually waived by October. Playing for Fort Worth of the Development League again, Azubuike averaged 5.0 rebounds, 3.2 assists, 1.17 steals, and a league-best 26.0 points in 37.7 minutes per contest, shooting 51.4% from the field and 48.5% from three-point range over twelve games.

=== Golden State Warriors (2007–2010) ===
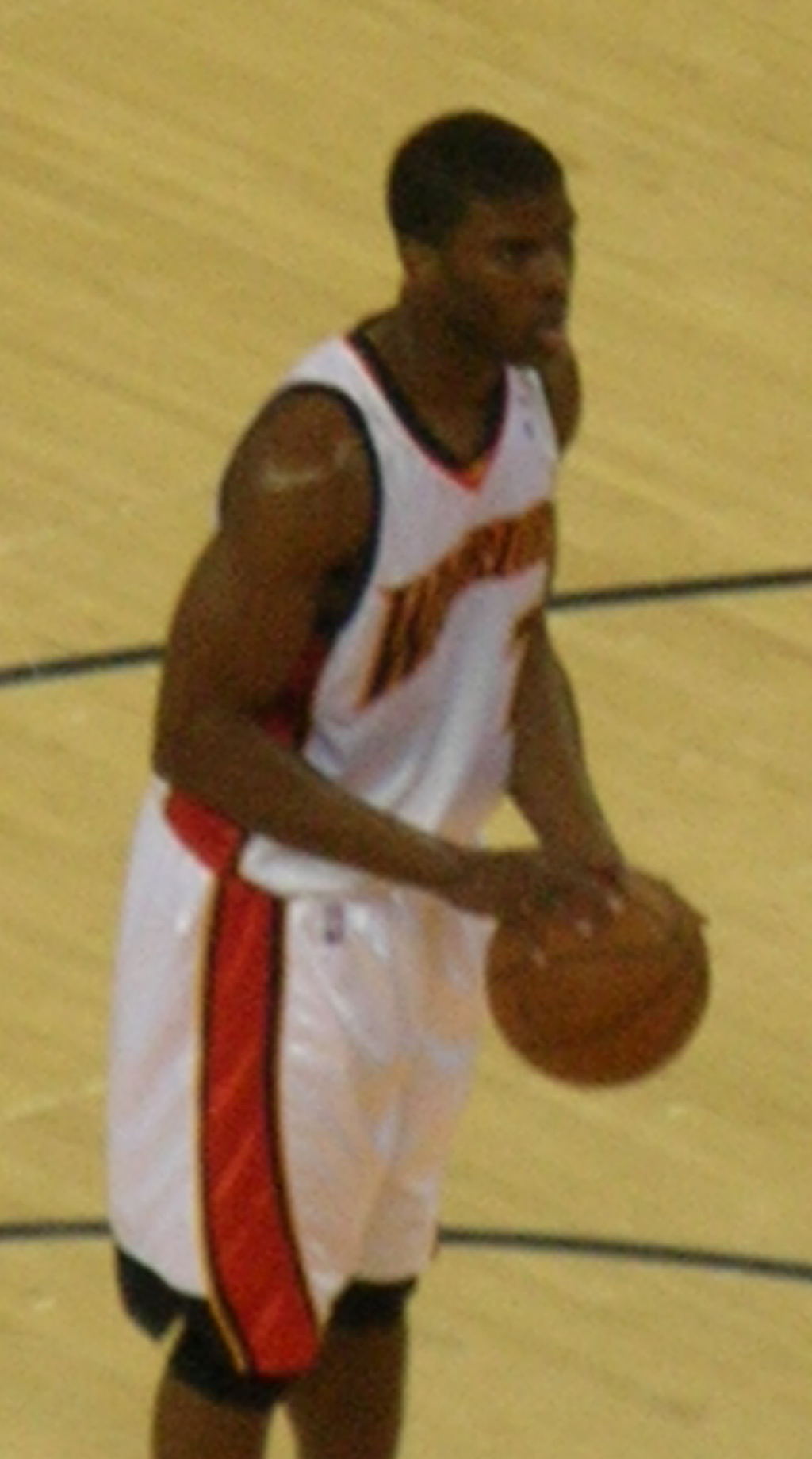
Azubuike with the Golden State Warriors in 2009

After going undrafted, Azubuike was signed by the Golden State Warriors on 2 January 2007. He was the first Gatorade Call-Up of the 2006–07 NBA Development League season, and the 49th player overall to be called up to the NBA since the D-League began play in November 2001. During his second season with Golden State, Azubuike expressed an interest in playing for the British team during the build-up to the 2012 London Olympic Games, but was denied British citizenship under the 1981 British Nationality Act. He was also eligible to play for the Nigeria national team. On 17 July 2008, Azubuike signed an offer sheet with the Los Angeles Clippers for a three-year deal worth $9 million, with Golden State having seven days to match the offer. In the final hour, Golden State matched the offer made by the Clippers on 24 July 2008, allowing Azubuike to remain a Warrior.

On 17 November 2009, it was announced that Azubuike would miss the rest of the 2009–10 season after tearing his right patellar tendon in a game at the Milwaukee Bucks.

On 9 July 2010, Azubuike was traded to the New York Knicks along with Anthony Randolph, Ronny Turiaf and a future second-round pick in a sign and trade deal for David Lee. Azubuike never played in a game for the Knicks. He was waived by the Knicks on 28 February 2011.

=== Dallas Mavericks (2012) ===
On 23 March 2012, Azubuike was signed by the Dallas Mavericks.

=== Texas Legends (2012) ===
As part of his comeback, he was assigned to the Mavericks' D-League affiliate, the Texas Legends. On 9 April 2012, he was recalled by the Mavericks. On 20 April 2012, Azubuike played in his first NBA game since 14 November 2009, against the Golden State Warriors. On 28 June 2012, during the 2012 NBA draft, Azubuike was traded to the Cleveland Cavaliers. He was waived by the Cavaliers on 14 October 2012.

== Broadcasting career ==
In the summer of 2015, Azubuike attended the Sportscaster U. program at Syracuse University sponsored by the NBPA, training for a career in broadcasting. Since then, he has been assigned to announce 11 of the 19 NBA D-League games produced by NBA TV in 2016. Various of these games have been broadcast by ESPNU.

He joined NBC Sports Bay Area in 2015, covering Warriors games as a studio analyst for the pregame, halftime, and postgame shows. Beginning in 2019, he became the television analyst alongside Bob Fitzgerald, replacing Jim Barnett, who had been the color analyst for the last 34 seasons and is now the color analyst on KGMZ-FM's 95.7 The Game. Azubuike has also worked as an analyst for the NBA on ESPN Radio since 2022.

== Personal life ==
In October 2022, Azubuike married Rona in an intimate ceremony after four years of dating. A year later, the couple had a grand multicultural wedding, where they celebrated with their family and friends.

Azubuike has three siblings: Nonzo, Nesochi and Adaeze. He is a Christian music fan and enjoys creating his own music. During the 2006–07 season, Azubuike made an appearance on Bay Area hip hop station KMEL and conducted an interview while the station played music which he personally produced. Azubuike is a Christian.

Azubuike has been involved with many humanitarian causes during his time in the NBA. Azubuike accepted a personal invitation from Jakaya Kikwete, the President of Tanzania, to take part in Leon H. Sullivan Summit VIII, a five-day convention held from 2 to 6 June 2008 in Arusha, Tanzania. The convention brought together many of the world's political and business leaders to focus attention and resources on Africa's economic and social development.

Azubuike is also the co-founder of The Athletes' Corner, which is a nonprofit organization working with professional athletes to create faith-based and family-focused media content.

The Golden State Warriors, Kaiser Permanente, and The Athletes' Corner have launched the 'Swishes for Dishes' initiative, a program donating meals to Bay Area food banks for each point scored. The initiative has resulted in the donation of over 5.4 million meals. Key aspects of the partnership include a donation of 100 meals for every point scored during the 2024–26 season and a focus on addressing food insecurity and promoting health and wellness in local communities. The program has had a total impact of providing millions of meals to families in need across the Bay Area.

== NBA career statistics ==
=== Regular season ===
Year	Team	GP	GS	MPG	FG%	3P%	FT%	RPG	APG	SPG	BPG	PPG
2006–07	Golden State	41	9	16.3	.445	.430	.782	2.3	.7	.5	.2	7.1
2007–08	Golden State	81	17	21.4	.445	.364	.717	4.0	.9	.6	.4	8.5
2008–09	Golden State	74	51	32.1	.464	.448	.808	5.0	1.6	.8	.7	14.4
2009–10	Golden State	9	7	25.7	.545	.370	.679	4.6	1.1	.6	1.0	13.9
2011–12	Dallas	3	0	6.0	.375	.333	.000	.0	.0	.3	.0	2.3
Career		208	84	24.2	.459	.409	.770	4.0	1.1	.6	.5	10.5

=== Playoffs ===
Year	Team	GP	GS	MPG	FG%	3P%	FT%	RPG	APG	SPG	BPG	PPG
2007	Golden State	6	0	2.5	.333	.000	1.000	.7	.0	.2	.0	0.7
2012	Dallas	1	0	5.0	.333	1.000	.000	1.0	.0	1.0	.0	3.0
Career		7	0	2.7	.333	.500	1.000	.7	.0	.3	.0	1.0

== See also ==
- List of European basketball players in the United States
