= Bobby Jones (basketball, born 1984) =

American basketball player (born 1984)

Personal information
- Born: 9 January 1984 (age 42) Compton, California, U.S.
- Listed height: 6 ft 7 in (2.01 m)
- Listed weight: 216 lb (98 kg)

Career information
- High school: Long Beach Polytechnic (Long Beach, California)
- College: Washington (2002–2006)
- NBA draft: 2006: 2nd round, 37th overall pick
- Drafted by: Minnesota Timberwolves
- Playing career: 2006–2021
- Position: Small forward / shooting guard

Career history
- 2006–2007: Philadelphia 76ers
- 2006: →Fort Worth Flyers
- 2007–2008: Denver Nuggets
- 2008: Memphis Grizzlies
- 2008: Sioux Falls Skyforce
- 2008: Houston Rockets
- 2008: Miami Heat
- 2008: San Antonio Spurs
- 2008–2009: Sioux Falls Skyforce
- 2009–2010: Banca Tercas Teramo
- 2011: Fulgor Libertas Forlì
- 2011–2012: Giorgio Tesi Group Pistoia
- 2012–2015: Acea Roma
- 2015–2016: Juvecaserta
- 2016–2017: Unione Cestistica Casalpusterlengo
- 2017–2018: Pallacanestro Mantovana
- 2018–2019: NPC Rieti
- 2019: Kumamoto Volters
- 2019–2020: Roseto Sharks
- 2020–2021: Scaligera Basket
- Stats at NBA.com
- Stats at Basketball Reference
Medals
Men's basketball
Representing the United States
Summer Universiade
Gold medal – first place	2005 Izmir	National team

Bobby Ray Jones Jr. (born 9 January 1984) is an American-born naturalised-Equatorial Guinean professional basketball player who last played for Scaligera Basket of the Italian Serie A2. He notably played for an NBA record five different teams in a single season (2007–08), later moving to Italy to continue his career.

== College career ==
Jones played high school basketball with Dominguez (Compton, California) for three years – playing alongside Tyson Chandler – before moving to Long Beach Polytechnic for his senior year amidst the controversial nomination of Mack Calvin as coach.

He joined the University of Washington, playing in the Pacific-10 Conference of the NCAA Division I, in May 2002.

Playing 27 games as a freshman, the last 15 as a starter, he averaged 4.1 rebounds per game. As a sophomore, he was involved in 31 games (25 starts), posting averages of 11.2 points. His junior season saw him start all but one of the 34 games he played in, contributing 11.2 points and a team-best 5.6 rebounds for Washington as they won the 2005 Pac-10 tournament for the first time.

He averaged 10.4 points and 4.9 rebounds in his senior season. At the end of his Huskies career in 2006, Jones was ranked 20th among the school's all-time scorers with 1,226 career points and 4th in career steals with 134. His last collegiate game was the NABC College All-Star game.

== Professional career ==
=== Philadelphia 76ers (2006–2007) ===
Jones was drafted by the Minnesota Timberwolves with the 37th pick in the second round of the 2006 NBA draft on 28 June 2006, he was traded the same day to the Philadelphia 76ers in exchange for a 2007 second-round draft pick and cash considerations. He was assigned to the Fort Worth Flyers of the NBA Development League on 28 November, averaging 13.7 points and 8 rebounds in around 24 minutes per game over 3 games, before being recalled on 8 December. With the Sixers he would have 2.5 points and 1.3 rebounds in more than 7 minutes per game in the NBA over 44 appearances, with an end of season flourish of 13.5 points and 3.8 rebounds in 31 minutes on average over the last four games of the season.

=== Denver Nuggets (2007–2008) ===
On 10 September 2007, the Denver Nuggets announced they had traded for Jones and Steven Hunter in exchange of Reggie Evans and Ricky Sanchez's draft rights. He was waived by the Nuggets on 7 January 2008, having averaged 3.3 points and 1.4 rebounds in 23 games.

=== Memphis Grizzlies (2008) ===
The Memphis Grizzlies signed Jones to a 10-day contract on 10 January 2008. After posting 20 points, 13 rebounds and 7 assists in a matchup with the Seattle SuperSonics, he was signed to another 10-day contract, the last one the Grizzlies could offer before signing for the season or releasing him.

=== Sioux Falls Skyforce (2008) ===
The Grizzlies did not offer Jones a new contract and he moved to D-League side Sioux Falls Skyforce, playing only two games.

=== Houston Rockets (2008) ===
Jones was called up by the Houston Rockets on 26 February 2008.

=== Return to the Skyforce (2008) ===
Returning to the Skyforce after ten days passed, Jones played in one game before again being called back to the NBA.

=== Miami Heat (2008) ===
Jones signed a 10-day contract with the Miami Heat on 12 March 2008. Posting 8 points and 4 rebounds in nearly 24 minutes per game over six contests with Miami, including a team-high 15 points in his final game, was not enough to earn a contract extension.

=== Third stint with the Skyforce (2008) ===
Jones returned to the Skyforce at the expiry of his contract with the Heat. He would play only two more games for the Skyforce.

=== San Antonio Spurs (2008) ===
Jones signed for his fifth NBA team of the season (by now a record), the San Antonio Spurs, on 1 April 2008. Right after that contract, on 11 April, Jones was re-signed by the Denver Nuggets on a deal until August, with a non-guaranteed option for the next season.

=== Fourth stint with the Skyforce (2008–2009) ===
On 28 July 2008, Jones was traded along with Taurean Green and 2010 draft second round pick for the New York Knicks' Renaldo Balkman and cash considerations. In effect he was just a bargaining chip in a salary dump by the Knicks, who – with 17 players compared to the league maximum of 15 – were widely expected to cut him, which happened the next day. On 5 August 2008, he was claimed off waivers by the Miami Heat, but after Yakhouba Diawara was signed at his position two days later, he was again waived on 15 August. He joined the Sacramento Kings' training camp on 30 September, before being waived again on 21 October. Returning to the Sioux Falls Skyforce in November 2008, he spent the 2008–09 D-League season with the team, finishing with 16.1 points, 7.6 rebounds and 2.4 assists in more than 34 minutes per game after playing 49 games.

=== Banca Tercas Teramo (2009–2010) ===
Jones played with the Portland Trail Blazers in the NBA Summer League from 13 to 19 July 2009, posting 7.4 points, 3.8 rebounds and 1.6 steals in nearly 25 minutes per game. He declared preferring an overseas move over another D-League contract if he did not make an NBA team by mid-to-late August, which happened sooner as he signed a contract with Italian Serie A side Banca Tercas Teramo on 24 July 2009.

His Teramo career started as he scored a team-high 16 points in the 27 October game against APOEL, including two contest-winning free-throws with 5 seconds left to play, that helped the Italians reach the group stage of the European second-tier Eurocup. He finished the competition 12 points, 5.5 rebounds and 1.3 steals over 27 minutes per game, posting 11 points 3.6 rebounds and 1.8 steals in around 25 minutes per game domestically.

=== Sutor Montegranaro (2010–2011) ===
Despite having one-year left on his two-year contract with, Jones bemoaned his difficulties living abroad and adapting to the European game (especially officiating and training), publicly contemplating a departure. He left Teramo but stayed in Italy and the Serie A, signing for Fabi Shoes Montegranaro in July 2010. Averaging 7.8 points, 3.5 rebounds and 2 steals in around 22 minutes per game, Jones did not convince Montegranaro, who replaced him with Ryan Toolson and released him in March 2011.

=== Fulgor Libertas Forlì (2011) ===
Jones moved right after to Fulgor Libertas Forlì of the second division LegaDue. Forlì – at the time battling to avoid relegation – won 8 of 9 games played after Jones' arrival to stave off relegation, with the American contributing 17.2 points, 9 rebounds and 3 steals per game.

=== Pistoia Basket (2011–2012) ===
Jones did not answer Forlì's attempts to extend his contract, penning another with rival LegaDue side Giorgio Tesi Group Pistoia in July 2011. At first struggling with fouls, committing more (4.3) than any other player in the league at one stage, that limited his playing time, Jones flourished after being repositioned as a power forward halfway through the season, augmenting his points and rebounds averages whilst diminishing his ejections (3 compared to 7 earlier in the season). He averaged 14.4 points and 7.9 rebounds over the season, with some decisive performances in the promotion playoffs to help Pistoia reach the finals against Enel Brindisi, though they were thwarted in their efforts to earn the lone Serie A spot. That was in spite of an incredible game 3 performance from Jones, that saw him contribute 31 points, 9 rebounds and 2 steals while drawing 12 fouls to earn a game-high valutation of 37, in a victory that kept the series alive at the time.

=== Virtus Roma (2012–2015) ===
Jones returned to the Serie A in all cases, signing a deal with Acea Roma on 26 July 2012. Unequal performances saw him average 6.6 points and 4.6 rebounds (with a receding 2.5 fouls) in around 19 minutes per game during the regular season. He had a more positive impact during the playoffs, starting in the quarterfinal series against Trendwalker Reggio Emilia, with 16 points and 9 rebounds coupled and a good defense on Andrea Cinciarini during game 3, then 9 points and 10 rebounds for a +/- of +19 in the decisive game 7. In the finals series against Montepaschi Siena, he was determinant in a diverse way, scoring only 3 points but committing 4 fouls, including an unsportsmanlike foul when he held back Daniel Hackett by his jersey with only 41 seconds left in the game, which moved Siena's lead from 3 to an unassailable 7, as they claimed the title in the following game. He ended the playoffs having played 19 matches in total, for 9.1 points, 5.5 rebounds and 1.6 steals in nearly 27 minutes on average.

On 23 August 2013, Jones re-signed with Roma for another season. Rome had expected him to acquire Cotonou status (allowing him to have EU status on the roster), however, Jones' efforts to acquire a Dominican Republic passport were unsuccessful and he was not played by Rome to avoid going over the foreigner limit. After acquiring a passport from Equatorial Guinea, Jones played his first league game of the season on 10 November, posting 20 points (from 80% shooting accuracy), 4 rebounds and 1 assist to help a Rome side coming from two defeats beat Caserta. The team's next game in the Eurocup, in which Jones had been able to play earlier in the season, also saw him in good form, posting a team-high 19 points against Bonn (that proved to his season high in the competition, he averaged 8.1 points and 3.3 rebounds in nearly 22 minutes as Roma exited at the group stage). In Serie A, Jones had a consistent 2013–14 season, finishing with 11.4 points, 4.5 rebounds and 1.2 assists in nearly 28 minutes across 31 games, as Roma's playoff run was again stopped by Montepaschi, this time in the semifinal, notwithstanding a good game 4 performance from Jones (18 points) that brought them their only win in the series.

Jones was the only Virtus player reconfirmed the next year, as the cash-strapped club assembled a squad made of rookies and players unproven in the Serie A. The team predictably struggled, with Jones one of few to perform well, he was singled out by the La Gazzetta dello Sport as one of the unrehalded key men of the league (and one of the best defenders). He was also decisive in the Italians' Eurocup campaign where his good output, including a 19 points, 9 rebounds and 6 assists game against Nymburk that gave him a PIR of 36, helped them reach the Last 32. This streak continued in that round, with Jones contributing 8 rebounds and 18 points, of which a three-point play that sent the game to overtime, as Roma beat Krasny Oktyabr on their way to the Eighthfinals. His form dipped afterwards, he had little impact in the Eighthfinals defeat to Banvit, before a hand fracture ended his season in mid-April, leaving Rome short of his leadership and defense. His average statistics at the end of the season read: 11.1 points, 5.1 rebounds and 1.5 steals in nearly 29 minutes in the Serie A, 11.1 points, 4.6 rebounds 2.1 assists and 1.3 steals over 27 minutes in the Eurocup.

=== Juvecaserta (2015–2016) ===
With Roma reported to have opted out of the second year on his contract, Jones became a free agent, signing with fellow Serie A side Juvecaserta for the 2015–16 season on 7 August 2015.

=== Casalpusterlengo (2016–2017) ===
On 13 July 2016, Unione Cestistica Casalpusterlengo was reported to have signed Jones. On 15 March 2017, Jones was reported to have parted-way with Unione Cestistica Casalpusterlengo.

=== Pallacanestro Mantovana (2017–2018) ===
On 9 July 2017, Pallacanestro Mantovana was reported to have signed Jones.

=== Kienergia Rieti (2018–2019) ===
On 28 September 2018, NPC Rieti was reported to have signed Jones.

=== Kumamoto Vorters (2019) ===
Jones started off the 2019–20 season with the Kumamoto Vorters.

=== Roseto Sharks (2019–2020) ===
On 2 December 2019, Jones signed with Roseto Sharks of the Italian Serie A2.

=== Scaligera (2020–2021) ===
On 9 January 2020, Jones signed with Scaligera Basket of the Italian Serie A2.

== International career ==
Whilst at Washington, Jones was part of the United States representative national team that went to the 2005 Summer Universiade, played in İzmir (Turkey) that August. He averaged 2.4 points, 1.9 rebounds and 1 assist and steal apiece off the bench as the unbeaten U.S. team took home gold.

== NBA career statistics ==
Legend
GP	Games played	GS	Games started	MPG	Minutes per game
FG%	Field goal percentage	3P%	3-point field goal percentage	FT%	Free throw percentage
RPG	Rebounds per game	APG	Assists per game	SPG	Steals per game
BPG	Blocks per game	PPG	Points per game	**Bold**	Career high

Source.

=== Regular season ===
Year	Team	GP	GS	MPG	FG%	3P%	FT%	RPG	APG	SPG	BPG	PPG
2006–07	Philadelphia	**44**	**5**	7.6	.462	.111	.561	1.3	.4	.3	.0	2.5
2007–08	Denver	25	0	8.9	.406	.391	.821	1.5	.4	.2	.0	3.4
2007–08	Memphis	9	2	15.2	.389	.231	**.900**	3.0	**1.2**	.6	**.2**	4.4
2007–08	Houston	4	0	2.3	.500	.000	.000	.3	.0	.2	.0	1.0
2007–08	Miami	6	0	**23.8**	**.531**	**.400**	.615	**4.0**	.8	.3	.0	**8.0**
2007–08	San Antonio	3	0	6.7	.250	.000	.000	.7	.3	**.7**	.0	.7
Career		91	7	9.5	.442	.306	.685	1.6	.5	.3	.0	3.2

== Film maker ==
In his third year playing basketball in Italy, Jones wrote a post to his blog, Bobby's World, called "The Overseas Basketball Life: Part 1." This entry detailed the reality of his experience playing ball and living abroad. For "Part 2," he found that he had too much to say - and so he decided to create a movie. Tens of thousands of dollars spent, countless hours worked, and two years later, Basketball Jones: The Overseas Journey was finished, a 90-minute documentary about the 2,000 "job openings" filled annually by expatriate American ballers overseas. Basketball Jones explores why some players can make it abroad while others cannot, told through the testimonials of nine American basketball players. Jones has screened Basketball Jones at his alma mater Long Beach Poly in Los Angeles, in Rome, and in Seattle in July 2015.
