= 2023–24 Minnesota Golden Gophers men's basketball team =

Basketball team

2023–24 Minnesota Golden Gophers men's basketball

NIT, Second round
- Conference: Big Ten Conference
- Record: 19–15 (9–11 Big Ten)
- Head coach: Ben Johnson (3rd season)
- Assistant coaches: Dave Thorson (3rd season); Jason Kemp (3rd season); Marcus Jenkins (3rd season); Josh Adel (1st season)
- Home arena: Williams Arena

2023–24 Big Ten Conference men's basketball standings
	Conf.				Overall
Team	W		L	PCT	W		L	PCT
No. 2 Purdue	17	–	3	.850	34	–	5	.872
No. 6 Illinois †	14	–	6	.700	29	–	9	.763
Nebraska	12	–	8	.600	23	–	11	.676
Northwestern	12	–	8	.600	22	–	12	.647
Wisconsin	11	–	9	.550	22	–	14	.611
Indiana	10	–	10	.500	19	–	14	.576
Iowa	10	–	10	.500	19	–	15	.559
Michigan State	10	–	10	.500	20	–	15	.571
Minnesota	9	–	11	.450	19	–	15	.559
Ohio State	9	–	11	.450	22	–	14	.611
Penn State	9	–	11	.450	16	–	17	.485
Maryland	7	–	13	.350	16	–	17	.485
Rutgers	7	–	13	.350	15	–	17	.469
Michigan	3	–	17	.150	8	–	24	.250
† 2024 Big Ten tournament winner Rankings from AP poll

The 2023–24 Minnesota Golden Gophers men's basketball team represented the University of Minnesota in the 2023–24 NCAA Division I men's basketball season. The Gophers, led by third-year head coach Ben Johnson, played their home games at Williams Arena in Minneapolis, Minnesota as members of the Big Ten Conference.

== Previous season ==
The Gophers finished the 2022–23 season 9–22, 2–17 in Big Ten play, to finish in last place in the conference. The team once again saw major roster turnover, with eight players graduating from the 2021–22 team. In addition, two of the four returning players, Parker Fox and Isaiah Ihnen, suffered season-ending knee injuries prior to the start of the season.

== Offseason ==
=== Departures ===
Name	Number	Pos.	Height	Weight	Year	Hometown	Reason for departure
Taurus Samuels	0	G	6'1"	195	Graduate student	Oceanside, CA	Graduated
Jamison Battle	10	F	6'7"	220	Junior	Robbinsdale, MN	Transferred to Ohio State
Jaden Henley	24	G/F	6'7"	200	Freshman	Ontario, CA	Transferred to DePaul
Treyton Thompson	42	C	7'0"	210	Sophomore	Glenwood, MN	Transferred to Stetson
Ta'Lon Cooper	55	G	6'4"	195	Junior	Roebuck, SC	Transferred to South Carolina

=== Incoming transfers ===
Name	Number	Pos.	Height	Weight	Year	Hometown	Previous school
Elijah Hawkins	0	G	5'11"	160	Junior	Washington, D.C.	Howard
Mike Mitchell Jr.	2	G	6'2"	190	Junior	San Jose, CA	Pepperdine
Jack Wilson	33	C	6'11"	290	Graduate student	Montara, CA	Washington State

=== Recruiting classes ===
==== 2023 recruiting class ====
College recruiting information
Name	Hometown	School	Height	Weight	Commit date
Cam Christie; SG	Rolling Meadows, IL	Rolling Meadows High School	6 ft 5 in (1.96 m)	160 lb (73 kg)	Jul 29, 2022
Cam Christie; SG	Recruit ratings: Rivals: 247Sports: ESPN:				
Kristupas Keinys; SF	Klaipėda, Lithuania	Klaipedos Vytauto Didžiojo gimnazija	6 ft 8 in (2.03 m)	195 lb (88 kg)	Jun 20, 2023
Kristupas Keinys; SF	Recruit ratings: No ratings found				
Overall recruit ranking: 247Sports: 85
Note: In many cases, Scout, Rivals, 247Sports, On3, and ESPN may conflict in their listings of height and weight.; In these cases, the average was taken. ESPN grades are on a 100-point scale.; Sources: "2023 Team Ranking". Rivals.

==== 2024 recruiting class ====
College recruiting information (2024)
Name	Hometown	School	Height	Weight	Commit date
Isaac Asuma; PG	Mountain Iron, MN	Cherry School	6 ft 3 in (1.91 m)	170 lb (77 kg)	Mar 2, 2023
Isaac Asuma; PG	Recruit ratings: Rivals: 247Sports: ESPN:				
Grayson Grove; PF	Alexandria, MN	Alexandria Area High School	6 ft 8 in (2.03 m)	200 lb (91 kg)	May 13, 2023
Grayson Grove; PF	Recruit ratings: No ratings found				
Overall recruit ranking:
Note: In many cases, Scout, Rivals, 247Sports, On3, and ESPN may conflict in their listings of height and weight.; In these cases, the average was taken. ESPN grades are on a 100-point scale.; Sources: "2024 Team Ranking". Rivals.

== Roster ==
2023–24 Minnesota Golden Gophers men's basketball team
Players
Coaches

Pos.	#	Name	Height	Weight	Year	Previous school	Hometown
G	0	Elijah Hawkins	5 ft 11 in (1.8 m)	165 lb (75 kg)	Jr	DeMatha Catholic; Howard	Washington, D.C.
F	1	Joshua Ola-Joseph	6 ft 7 in (2.01 m)	215 lb (98 kg)	So	Compass Prep	Brooklyn Park, MN
G	2	Mike Mitchell Jr.	6 ft 2 in (1.88 m)	185 lb (84 kg)	Jr	Archbishop Mitty; Pepperdine	San Jose, CA
F	3	Dawson Garcia	6 ft 11 in (2.11 m)	230 lb (104 kg)	Jr	Prior Lake; North Carolina	Savage, MN
G	4	Braeden Carrington	6 ft 4 in (1.93 m)	195 lb (88 kg)	So	Park Center	Brooklyn Park, MN
F	5	Isaiah Ihnen	6 ft 10 in (2.08 m)	220 lb (100 kg)	RS Jr	IBA Munich	Böblingen, Germany
F	8	Kris Keinys	6 ft 8 in (2.03 m)	215 lb (98 kg)	Fr	Klaipedos Vytauto Didžiojo	Klaipėda, Lithuania
G	11	Jackson Purcell (W)	6 ft 5 in (1.96 m)	195 lb (88 kg)	RS So	Eastview	Apple Valley, MN
F	12	Erick Reader (W)	6 ft 8 in (2.03 m)	210 lb (95 kg)	Fr	New Life Academy	Bloomington, MN
F	15	Kadyn Betts	6 ft 8 in (2.03 m)	220 lb (100 kg)	RS Fr	Central	Pueblo, CO
F	21	Pharrel Payne	6 ft 9 in (2.06 m)	255 lb (116 kg)	So	Park	Cottage Grove, MN
F	23	Parker Fox	6 ft 8 in (2.03 m)	220 lb (100 kg)	RS Sr	Mahtomedi; Northern State	Mahtomedi, MN
G	24	Cam Christie	6 ft 6 in (1.98 m)	190 lb (86 kg)	Fr	Rolling Meadows	Arlington Heights, IL
G	25	Will Ramberg (W)	6 ft 5 in (1.96 m)	205 lb (93 kg)	Sr	Cook County; McGill	Grand Marais, MN
C	33	Jack Wilson	6 ft 11 in (2.11 m)	285 lb (129 kg)	GS	Junípero Serra; Washington State	Montara, CA

Head coach

- Ben Johnson (Minnesota)

Assistant coach(es)

- Dave Thorson (Hamline)
- Jason Kemp (UW–La Crosse)
- Marcus Jenkins (Air Force)
- Josh Adel (Florida)

Legend

- (C) Team captain
- (S) Suspended
- (I) Ineligible
- (W) Walk-on
- Injured
- Current redshirt

Roster
Last update: 2024-05-16

== Schedule and results ==
Date time, TV	Rank^{#}	Opponent^{#}	Result	Record	High points	High rebounds	High assists	Site (attendance) city, state
Exhibition
November 2, 2023*; 7:00 p.m., B1G+		Macalester	W 97–73		21 – Ola–Joseph	11 – Garcia	9 – tied	Williams Arena (2,604); Minneapolis, MN
Regular season
November 6, 2023*; 7:00 p.m., B1G+		Bethune–Cookman	W 80–60	1–0	23 – Garcia	14 – Garcia	6 – Garcia	Williams Arena (7,132); Minneapolis, MN
November 10, 2023*; 6:30 p.m., Peacock		UTSA	W 102–76	2–0	22 – Garcia	10 – Hawkins	8 – Hawkins	Williams Arena (6,973); Minneapolis, MN
November 16, 2023*; 8:00 p.m., BTN		Missouri	L 68–70	2–1	16 – Garcia	13 – Carrington	6 – Hawkins	Williams Arena (7,975); Minneapolis, MN
November 18, 2023*; 1:00 p.m., Peacock		USC Upstate	W 67–53	3–1	14 – Garcia	6 – Garcia	5 – Hawkins	Williams Arena (7,347); Minneapolis, MN
November 21, 2023*; 8:00 p.m., BTN		Arkansas–Pine Bluff	W 86–67	4–1	19 – Garcia	9 – Garcia	4 – tied	Williams Arena (6,591); Minneapolis, MN
November 26, 2023*; 7:30 p.m., CBSSN		vs. San Francisco	L 58–76	4–2	19 – Garcia	6 – tied	5 – Hawkins	Chase Center (3,682); San Francisco, CA
November 30, 2023*; 6:00 p.m., BTN		New Orleans	W 97–64	5–2	20 – Christie	7 – Carrington	9 – Hawkins	Williams Arena (6,797); Minneapolis, MN
December 3, 2023; 5:30 p.m., BTN		at Ohio State	L 74–84	5–3 (0–1)	36 – Garcia	11 – Garcia	5 – Hawkins	Value City Arena (10,481); Columbus, OH
December 6, 2023; 8:00 p.m., BTN		Nebraska	W 76–65	6–3 (1–1)	15 – Ola-Joseph	6 – Hawkins	11 – Hawkins	Williams Arena (6,899); Minneapolis, MN
December 9, 2023*; 11:00 a.m., BTN		Florida Gulf Coast	W 77–57	7–3	17 – Ola-Joseph	7 – Fox	11 – Hawkins	Williams Arena (7,317); Minneapolis, MN
December 12, 2023*; 7:00 p.m., B1G+		IUPUI	W 101–65	8–3	19 – Christie	8 – Payne	17 – Hawkins	Williams Arena (6,581); Minneapolis, MN
December 21, 2023*; 7:00 p.m., B1G+		Ball State	W 80–63	9–3	20 – Mitchell Jr.	7 – tied	9 – Hawkins	Williams Arena (7,261); Minneapolis, MN
December 29, 2023*; 6:00 p.m., Peacock		Maine	W 80–62	10–3	18 – Mitchell Jr.	8 – Payne	10 – Hawkins	Williams Arena (8,658); Minneapolis, MN
January 4, 2024; 8:00 p.m., Peacock		at Michigan	W 73–71	11–3 (2–1)	18 – Mitchell Jr.	12 – Garcia	7 – Hawkins	Crisler Center (10,493); Ann Arbor, MI
January 7, 2024; 4:30 p.m., BTN		Maryland	W 65–62	12–3 (3–1)	12 – Christie	6 – tied	9 – Hawkins	Williams Arena (8,583); Minneapolis, MN
January 12, 2024; 5:30 p.m., FS1		at Indiana	L 62–74	12–4 (3–2)	17 – Payne	10 – Payne	6 – Hawkins	Simon Skjodt Assembly Hall (17,222); Bloomington, IN
January 15, 2024; 5:00 p.m., BTN		Iowa	L 77–86	12–5 (3–3)	30 – Garcia	5 – tied	9 – Hawkins	Williams Arena (8,379); Minneapolis, MN
January 18, 2024; 5:30 p.m., FS1		at Michigan State	L 66–76	12–6 (3–4)	22 – Garcia	10 – Payne	5 – Mitchell Jr.	Breslin Center (14,797); East Lansing, MI
January 23, 2024; 6:00 p.m., BTN		No. 13 Wisconsin	L 59–61	12–7 (3–5)	16 – Hawkins	7 – Payne	9 – Hawkins	Williams Arena (10,013); Minneapolis, MN
January 27, 2024; 5:30 p.m., BTN		at Penn State	W 83–74	13–7 (4–5)	22 – Garcia	8 – Christie	5 – tied	Bryce Jordan Center (12,336); University Park, PA
February 3, 2024; 1:00 p.m., BTN		Northwestern	W 75–66 ^{OT}	14–7 (5–5)	20 – Garcia	9 – Payne	10 – Hawkins	Williams Arena (9,492); Minneapolis, MN
February 6, 2024; 8:00 p.m., Peacock		Michigan State	W 59–56	15–7 (6–5)	19 – Christie	7 – Payne	6 – Hawkins	Williams Arena (8,239); Minneapolis, MN
February 11, 2024; 2:00 p.m., BTN		at Iowa	L 85–90	15–8 (6–6)	18 – tied	7 – Garcia	6 – Hawkins	Carver–Hawkeye Arena (9,768); Iowa City, IA
February 15, 2024; 7:30 p.m., BTN		at No. 2 Purdue	L 76–84	15–9 (6–7)	24 – Garcia	5 – Payne	7 – Hawkins	Mackey Arena (14,876); West Lafayette, IN
February 18, 2024; 5:30 p.m., BTN		Rutgers	W 81–70	16–9 (7–7)	21 – Payne	11 – Payne	7 – Hawkins	Williams Arena (9,680); Minneapolis, MN
February 22, 2024; 7:00 p.m., BTN		Ohio State	W 88–79	17–9 (8–7)	24 – Hawkins	9 – Garcia	7 – Hawkins	Williams Arena (8,558); Minneapolis, MN
February 25, 2024; 5:30 p.m., BTN		at Nebraska	L 55–73	17–10 (8–8)	14 – Christie	9 – Fox	2 – Hawkins	Pinnacle Bank Arena (15,920); Lincoln, NE
February 28, 2024; 8:00 p.m., BTN		at No. 13 Illinois	L 97–105	17–11 (8–9)	29 – Garcia	9 – Payne	12 – Hawkins	State Farm Center (15,544); Champaign, IL
March 2, 2024; 2:15 p.m., BTN		Penn State	W 75–70	18–11 (9–9)	19 – Christie	6 – Fox	8 – Hawkins	Williams Arena (11,318); Minneapolis, MN
March 6, 2024; 8:00 p.m., BTN		Indiana	L 58–70	18–12 (9–10)	14 – Fox	12 – Garcia	6 – Mitchell Jr.	Williams Arena (9,002); Minneapolis, MN
March 9, 2024; 8:00 p.m., BTN		at Northwestern	L 66–90	18–13 (9–11)	30 – Garcia	9 – Garcia	10 – Hawkins	Welsh–Ryan Arena (7,039); Evanston, IL
Big Ten tournament
March 14, 2024; 11:00 a.m., BTN	(9)	vs. (8) Michigan State; Second round	L 67–77	18–14	19 – Garcia	4 – tied	7 – Hawkins	Target Center; Minneapolis, MN
NIT
March 19, 2024; 8:00 p.m., ESPNU		at (4) Butler; First round – Indiana State bracket	W 73–72	19–14	25 – Garcia	6 – Hawkins	15 – Hawkins	Hinkle Fieldhouse (3,478); Indianapolis, IN
March 24, 2024; 1:00 p.m., ESPN2		at (1) Indiana State; Second round – Indiana State bracket	L 64–76	19–15	16 – Payne	12 – Garcia	3 – Payne	Hulman Center (8,239); Terre Haute, IN
*Non-conference game. ^{#}Rankings from AP poll. (#) Tournament seedings in parentheses. All times are in Central Time.
