= Kevin Burleson =

American basketball player and coach

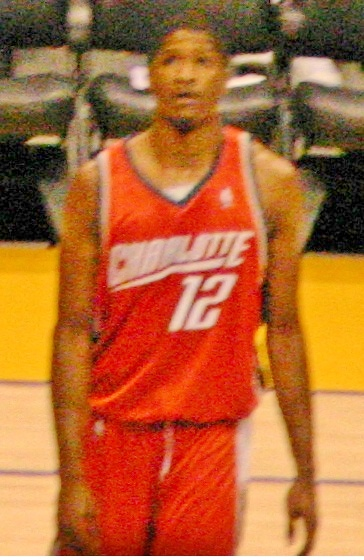
- Kevin Burleson in 2005 with the Charlotte Bobcats.

Detroit Pistons
- Title: Assistant coach
- League: NBA

Personal information
- Born: April 9, 1979 (age 47) Seattle, Washington, U.S.
- Listed height: 6 ft 3 in (1.91 m)
- Listed weight: 205 lb (93 kg)

Career information
- High school: O'Dea (Seattle, Washington)
- College: Minnesota (1999–2003)
- NBA draft: 2003: undrafted
- Playing career: 2003–2013
- Position: Point guard
- Number: 12
- Coaching career: 2017–present

Career history

Playing
- 2003–2004: USC Heidelberg
- 2004–2005: Walter Tigers Tübingen
- 2005–2006: Charlotte Bobcats
- 2006–2007: Fort Worth Flyers
- 2007–2008: Mersin Büyükşehir Belediyesi
- 2009: Idaho Stampede
- 2009–2010: CSU Asesoft Ploieşti
- 2012–2013: Al-Ittihad Alexandria

Coaching
- 2017–2018: Iowa Wolves (assistant)
- 2018–2019: Memphis Grizzlies (assistant)
- 2019–2022: Minnesota Timberwolves (assistant)
- 2022–2024: Rio Grande Valley Vipers
- 2024–present: Detroit Pistons (assistant)

Career highlights
- Romanian League champion (2010)
- Stats at NBA.com
- Stats at Basketball Reference

Kevin Burleson (born September 4, 1979) is an American professional basketball coach, and a former professional basketball player. He is currently an assistant coach for the Detroit Pistons of the National Basketball Association (NBA).

He played college basketball for the University of Minnesota Golden Gophers and began his professional career in the German basketball league. He played for the Charlotte Bobcats of the National Basketball Association (NBA) in 2005–06. During a 34-game stretch, Burleson played in 20 of those games and, during that period, missed 35 field-goal attempts in a row.

== Early life ==
Burleson was born in Seattle, Washington. He was born to a prolific sporting family: his father, Al Burleson, played defensive back in the Canadian Football League (CFL) and the United States Football League (USFL). His older brother Alvin Jr. played college football for the University of Washington Huskies and the Western Illinois University Leathernecks. His younger brother Nate was a wide receiver in the National Football League (NFL), while younger brother Lyndale played college basketball for the University of Nevada Wolf Pack. Kevin and Nate Burleson are one of only two sets of siblings in which one played in the NBA and one in the NFL. Like his brothers he played several sports early on, but gave up baseball as he found it too slow, and gave up football for fear of an injury that would prevent him from playing basketball.

Burleson graduated from O'Dea High School after transferring from Garfield High School after his freshman year. At O'Dea, Burleson earned three letters in basketball and one in track and field and played basketball under coach Phil Lumpkin. In his junior year, Burleson helped O'Dea go undefeated through a 29-game season and win the state title.

== College career ==
Burleson was offered a basketball scholarship to the University of Washington, but opted instead to attend the University of Minnesota for a chance to play in the Big Ten Conference. He played for the Minnesota Golden Gophers men's basketball team from 1999 to 2003 after redshirting the 1998–99 season. Minnesota made the 2001 National Invitation Tournament (NIT), and Burleson scored a season-high 21 points in Minnesota's win over Villanova in the first round. As a junior, Burleson led Minnesota with 146 assists and had an assist/turnover ratio 146–58.

== Professional career ==
Burleson began his professional career in Germany. He played for the USC Heidelberg in the 2003–2004 season and for the Walter Tigers Tübingen of Basketball Bundesliga in the 2004–2005 season. He was then signed by the Charlotte Bobcats of the NBA on August 31, 2005. He played with the Bobcats for the 2005–2006 season, but was subsequently cut.

In the 2006 NBA Development League draft, the Fort Worth Flyers picked Burleson as the fourth overall pick in the first round. Burleson played for the Flyers for the 2006–07 season, then signed with the Turkish Basketball League team Mersin Büyükşehir Belediye for the 2007–2008 season. In January 2009 he signed with the Idaho Stampede of the NBA Development League the day after being traded from the Iowa Energy. Burleson finished his career with the Egyptian team Al-Ittihad Alexandria.

== Coaching career ==
He began his coaching career with the Houston Rockets. He mainly focused on player development.

On June 15, 2018, Burleson was hired as assistant coach/player development coach for the Memphis Grizzlies.

On June 27, 2019, Burleson was hired by the Minnesota Timberwolves as a player development coach.

After three seasons in Minnesota, where he was head coach of the team in the NBA Summer League, in September 2022, he took over as head coach of the Rio Grande Valley Vipers of the G League.

On July 12, 2024, Burleson was hired as assistant coach for the Detroit Pistons.
