= Travarus Bennett =

American basketball player

Travarus Bennett (born 1979 in Rosedale, Mississippi) is a basketball player who has played professionally in Europe and the North American minor leagues. He played collegiately at the University of Minnesota.

Bennett transferred to the Golden Gophers after playing his first two years a junior college affiliated with Southwest Missouri State. In his senior season, he led the Big Ten in steals, finished second in three point percentage and was named the Big Ten's Co-Defensive Player of the Year, and Honorable Mention All BigTen in 2002.

He has had success in his European career. He led the Irish league in steals in the 2003-04 season, and won the Swiss Ligue Nationale de Basketball Defensive Player of the Year award in 2005 while playing for BBC Nyon. He also played for the Vermont Frost Heaves in the ABA. He also played in Germany and France.... In his first season in Germany, he averaged 18 pts, 6 rebs, 2 stls, and 3 assists for USC Heidelberg. His second season in Germany was in Tübingen, with Walter Tigers....
