= Ron Johnson (basketball) =

American basketball player (1938–2015)

Personal information
- Born: July 20, 1938 Hallock, Minnesota, U.S.
- Died: February 1, 2015 (aged 76) St. Cloud, Minnesota, U.S.
- Listed height: 6 ft 8 in (2.03 m)
- Listed weight: 215 lb (98 kg)

Career information
- High school: New Prague (New Prague, Minnesota)
- College: Minnesota (1957–1960)
- NBA draft: 1960: 2nd round, 12th overall pick
- Drafted by: Detroit Pistons
- Position: Forward
- Number: 9, 52

Career history
- 1960: Detroit Pistons
- 1960–1961: Los Angeles Lakers

Career highlights
- Third-team All-American – NABC (1960); Third-team All-American – AP (1959); 2× First-team All-Big Ten (1959, 1960)
- Stats at NBA.com
- Stats at Basketball Reference

Ronald F. Johnson (July 20, 1938 – February 1, 2015) was an American National Basketball Association (NBA) player. Johnson played at New Prague High School where he became Minnesota's first boys’ high school basketball player to score 2,000 career points (2,190) when he graduated in 1956.

As a junior at the University of Minnesota, Johnson was selected to the Associated Press (AP) All-American third team. In his senior season, Ron was selected to the NABC All-American third team. He played in the east–west college all-star game at New York City's Madison Square Garden in 1960. Johnson finished his collegiate career with 1,335 points (19.7 points per game average).

Johnson was drafted by the Detroit Pistons with the fourth pick in the second round of the 1960 NBA draft. On December 15, 1960, he was sold from the Pistons to the Los Angeles Lakers. In his one NBA season, Ron averaged 2.6 points and 2.1 rebounds per game.

Johnson, who was an attorney in St. Cloud, Minnesota, died of an aneurysm on February 1, 2015. He was 76.

== Career statistics ==
Legend
GP	Games played	GS	Games started	MPG	Minutes per game
FG%	Field goal percentage	3P%	3-point field goal percentage	FT%	Free throw percentage
RPG	Rebounds per game	APG	Assists per game	SPG	Steals per game
BPG	Blocks per game	PPG	Points per game	**Bold**	Career high

=== NBA ===
==== Regular season ====
Year	Team	GP	MPG	FG%	FT%	RPG	APG	PPG
1960–61	Detroit	6	**10.0**	**.367**	.643	**2.3**	**.2**	**5.2**
1960–61	L.A. Lakers	**8**	5.4	.154	**.667**	1.9	.1	.8
Career		14	7.4	.302	.647	2.1	.1	2.6
