= Quincy Lewis =

American basketball player (born 1977)

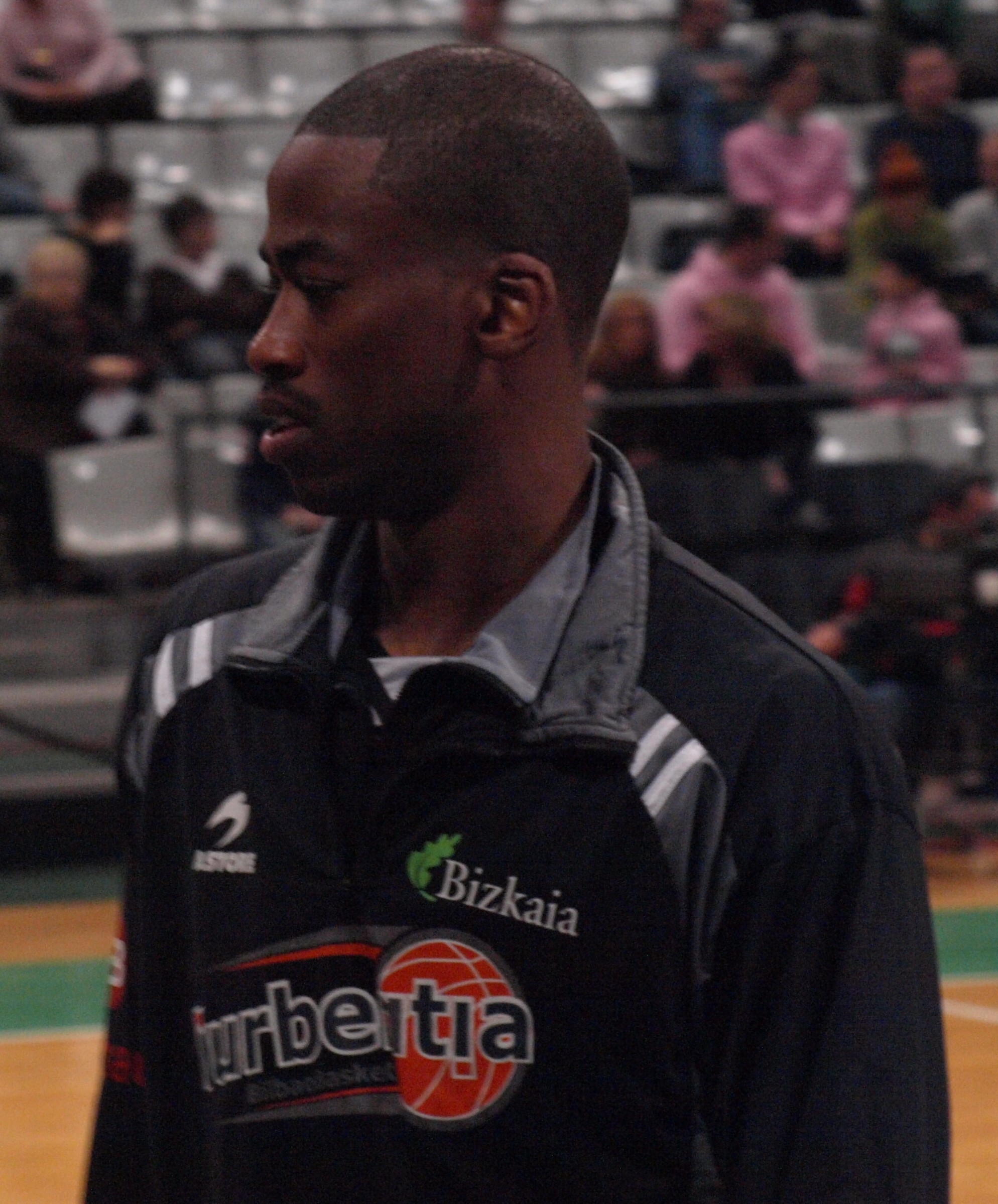
- Lewis with Bilbao

Personal information
- Born: June 26, 1977 (age 49) Little Rock, Arkansas, U.S.
- Listed height: 6 ft 7 in (2.01 m)
- Listed weight: 215 lb (98 kg)

Career information
- High school: Parkview Arts and Science Magnet (Little Rock, Arkansas)
- College: Minnesota (1995–1999)
- NBA draft: 1999: 1st round, 19th overall pick
- Drafted by: Utah Jazz
- Playing career: 1999–2009
- Position: Small forward / shooting guard
- Number: 20, 24

Career history
- 1999–2002: Utah Jazz
- 2002–2003: Maccabi Tel Aviv
- 2003–2004: Minnesota Timberwolves
- 2004–2005: Lucentum Alicante
- 2005–2006: Olympiacos
- 2006–2007: Lucentum Alicante
- 2007–2009: Iurbentia Bilbao Basket

Career highlights
- Greek League All-Star (2006); Israeli League champion (2003); Israeli Cup winner (2003); Third-team All-American – AP, NABC (1999); First-team All-Big Ten (1999)
- Stats at NBA.com
- Stats at Basketball Reference
Medals
Men's basketball
Representing United States
Goodwill Games
Gold medal – first place	1998 New York	Team competition

Quincy Lavell Lewis (born June 26, 1977) is an American former professional basketball player who last played with the pro club Iurbentia Bilbao Basket in Spain. He is currently the Director of Alumni Relations for the Utah Jazz.

== High School ==
Lewis played high school basketball at Parkview Arts and Science Magnet High School in Little Rock, Arkansas. He was named the Gatorade Player of the Year as a senior and an honorable mention All-American by Street & Smith's and Blue Chip Magazine. Lewis led Parkview to state titles as a sophomore and senior and a runner-up finish as a junior. He later became the second player to reach the NBA from Parkview, joining Derek Fisher.

== College career ==
Lewis played college basketball for the University of Minnesota. As a sophomore in 1997, Lewis was the team's 6th man and helped the Golden Gophers reach the NCAA Final Four.

As a junior, he helped Minnesota win the NIT and was named to the NIT All-Tournament Team and the All-Big Ten Tournament Team. He averaged 14.5 points per game for the season.

He was the Big Ten Conference's leading scorer during his senior year in college at 23.1 points per game and was named First-Team All-Big Ten and a Third-Team All-American.

At the end of his college career, he ranked sixth in Minnesota's career scoring list, with 1,614 points. He also recorded 127 three-point field goals and 502 rebounds.

Lewis was inducted into the Minnesota M Club Hall of Fame in 2018.

=== National Team Experience ===
Lewis was selected to the U.S. National Team for the 1998 Goodwill Games that won the gold medal in New York City with an overtime victory against Australia. The team was coached by Minnesota head coach Clem Haskins.

== Professional career ==
He was selected by the Utah Jazz in the 1st round (19th pick) of the 1999 NBA draft. He played for the Jazz from 1999–2002.

He was signed by the Minnesota Timberwolves as a free agent on September 26, 2003, for the 2003–04 season, and he was waived on December 20. He played with Maccabi Tel Aviv in Israel in 2002–03. He played five more seasons in Europe with Lucentum Alicante (2004–05, 2006–07), Olympiacos (2005–06), and Lurbentia Bilbao Basket (2007–09).

== Off the court ==
After retiring from professional basketball, Lewis returned to his alma mater where he completed a Master's degree. He worked for the Golden Gophers as a Major Gift Officer, Director of Student-Athlete Development, and Assistant Athletics Director overseeing the M Club. He also worked as a television analyst for Fox Sports North, covering the Minnesota Timberwolves.

Lewis was hired by the Utah Jazz in 2022 as the Director of Alumni Relations.

== Personal ==
Lewis is the son of Louis and Mabeline Lewis and was born June 26, 1977. He has a daughter, Ti'are, who played soccer at Westminster University in Salt Lake City.
