= Victory Christian School (Tulsa, Oklahoma) =

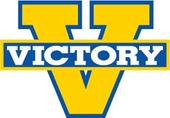

Location
- 7700 South Lewis; Tulsa, Oklahoma; United States; 36.0516°N 95.9595°W

Information
- Type: Private
- Motto: TRAIN - PREPARE - EQUIP
- Religious affiliation: Non-Denominational
- Established: 1979 as Sheridan Christian School
- Principal: Dan Donohue; Marti Malhi;
- Grades: K3 to 12
- Enrollment: 900
- Student to teacher ratio: 18:1
- Colors: Billy Joe Blue and Victory Gold and black and White
- Slogan: It's a good day to be a Conqueror. #CNQR
- Athletics conference: Pinnacle
- Mascot: Conquerors
- Nickname: VCS
- Website: www.vcstulsa.org

The Victory Christian School is a private Christian school located in Tulsa, Oklahoma at 7700 South Lewis. The school is co-educational and a subsidiary program of Victory Christian Center, a non-denominational Pentecostal church in Tulsa.

== History ==
Sheridan Christian School was founded in Tulsa in 1979 by Pastor Billy Joe Daugherty and his wife, Pastor Sharon Daugherty. In 1981, the school moved to 4400 South Sheridan Rd in Tulsa and changed its name to Victory Christian School. In 1989, the school moved a final time to its current facilities at 7700 S. Lewis Ave in Tulsa.

== Enrollment ==
In 1979, 269 students were enrolled in K-6. In 1980, grades 7-12 we added to the school, and the enrollment increased to 422 for K-12. In 1995, enrollment reached 835 in K-12. Enrollment was as an all-time high in 2013 at 1254 in K-12. Since then, enrollment has been steadily decreasing, and is currently at just under 1000 students.

== Working groups and voluntary teams (Examples) ==
=== Athletics ===
- Varsity: Baseball, Basketball, Football, Golf, Wrestling
- Junior High: Baseball, Basketball, Tennis, Volleyball

=== Fine Arts ===
- High school: Art, Band, Concert Band, Jazz Band, Marching Band, Worship Band, Photography
- Middle school: Art, Band, Choir

=== Knowledge and the Sciences ===
- High school: Academic Bowl, Chess Club, Robotics
- Middle school: Robotics
