= Melvin Newbern =

American basketball player (born 1967)

Personal information
- Born: June 11, 1967 (age 59) Toledo, Ohio, U.S.
- Listed height: 6 ft 4 in (1.93 m)
- Listed weight: 200 lb (91 kg)

Career information
- High school: Scott (Toledo, Ohio)
- College: Minnesota (1987–1990)
- NBA draft: 1990: undrafted
- Position: Shooting guard
- Number: 23

Career history
- 1990–1991: Quad City Thunder
- 1991: Cedar Rapids Silver Bullets
- 1991: Rapid City Thrillers
- 1991–1992: Yakima Sun Kings
- 1992: La Crosse Catbirds
- 1992: Tulsa Zone
- 1992–1993: Detroit Pistons
- 1993–1994: Fort Wayne Fury
- 1994: Hartford Hellcats
- 1994–1995: Sioux Falls Skyforce
- 1995: Rockford Lightning
- 1996–1997: La Crosse Bobcats
- 1997–1998: Sioux Falls Skyforce

Career highlights
- CBA steals leader (1998)
- Stats at NBA.com
- Stats at Basketball Reference

Melvin Newbern (born June 11, 1967) is an American former National Basketball Association (NBA) player with the Detroit Pistons. He played in 33 games in the 1992 season for the team, averaging 3.6 points per game. Born in Toledo, Ohio, Newbern played college basketball for the Minnesota Golden Gophers.

In addition to his time in the NBA, Newbern played six seasons in the Continental Basketball Association (CBA). In 263 total games for 11 different teams, he averaged 18.2 points per game.
