= New Life Academy of Woodbury =

Coordinates: 44°53′38″N 92°58′14″W

New Life Academy of Woodbury is a private Christian school located in Woodbury, Minnesota, United States. The school is available for preschool through 12th grade and there are about 830 students. New Life Academy of Woodbury, along with New Life Church of Woodbury, was founded in 1977 by Pastor Dick and Patti Wiens. New Life Academy is still closely tied to New Life Church. It is the largest Christian school in the eastern Twin Cities metro area.

== Academics ==
New Life Academy offers several different types of student services which include support services, guidance counseling and a summer language program for international students

== Extracurricular activities ==
Students may participate in a variety of clubs and athletic teams.

=== Clubs and Activities ===
- Chess Club
- Young Author Conference
- Band
- School of Fine Arts (SOFA)
- Knowledge Bowl
- Robotics
- NHS

=== Athletics ===
- New Life Academy's Athletic Affiliations include the MCAA (Minnesota Christian Athletic Association) and the MSHSL

==== Fall Sports ====
- Cheerleading
- Football - Junior High, Junior Varsity, and Varsity
- Soccer – Boys Junior Varsity and Varsity, and Girls Junior Varsity and Varsity
- Tennis – Girls Junior Varsity and Varsity
- Volleyball (Girls) – Junior High, Junior Varsity, and Varsity

==== Winter Sports ====
- Basketball – Boys 6th grade, 7th grade, 8th grade, C team, Junior Varsity and Varsity.
- Basketball– Girls 6th grade, 7th grade, 8th grade, Junior Varsity and Varsity.
- Cheerleading- Varsity Sideline
- Ice hockey- Boys JV, Varsity (CO-OP w/ South St. Paul Secondary)
- Ice hockey- Girls JV, Varsity (CO-OP w/ South St. Paul Secondary)

==== Spring Sports ====
- Baseball – Junior High, Junior Varsity, and Varsity
- Golf – Boys Junior Varsity and Varsity
- Softball – Junior High and Varsity
- Tennis– Boys Varsity
- Track and Field – Junior High and Varsity

The Academy also provides athletic opportunities to those in the surrounding community. A variety of summer sports camps available.

== Music and Fine Arts ==
- Band
- High School Choir
- Morningstar
- Junior High Choir
- Elementary Music
- Worship Choir
- Visual Arts
- Performing Arts
- SOFA (School of Fine Arts)
- New Life News
