= Elijah Hawkins =

American basketball player

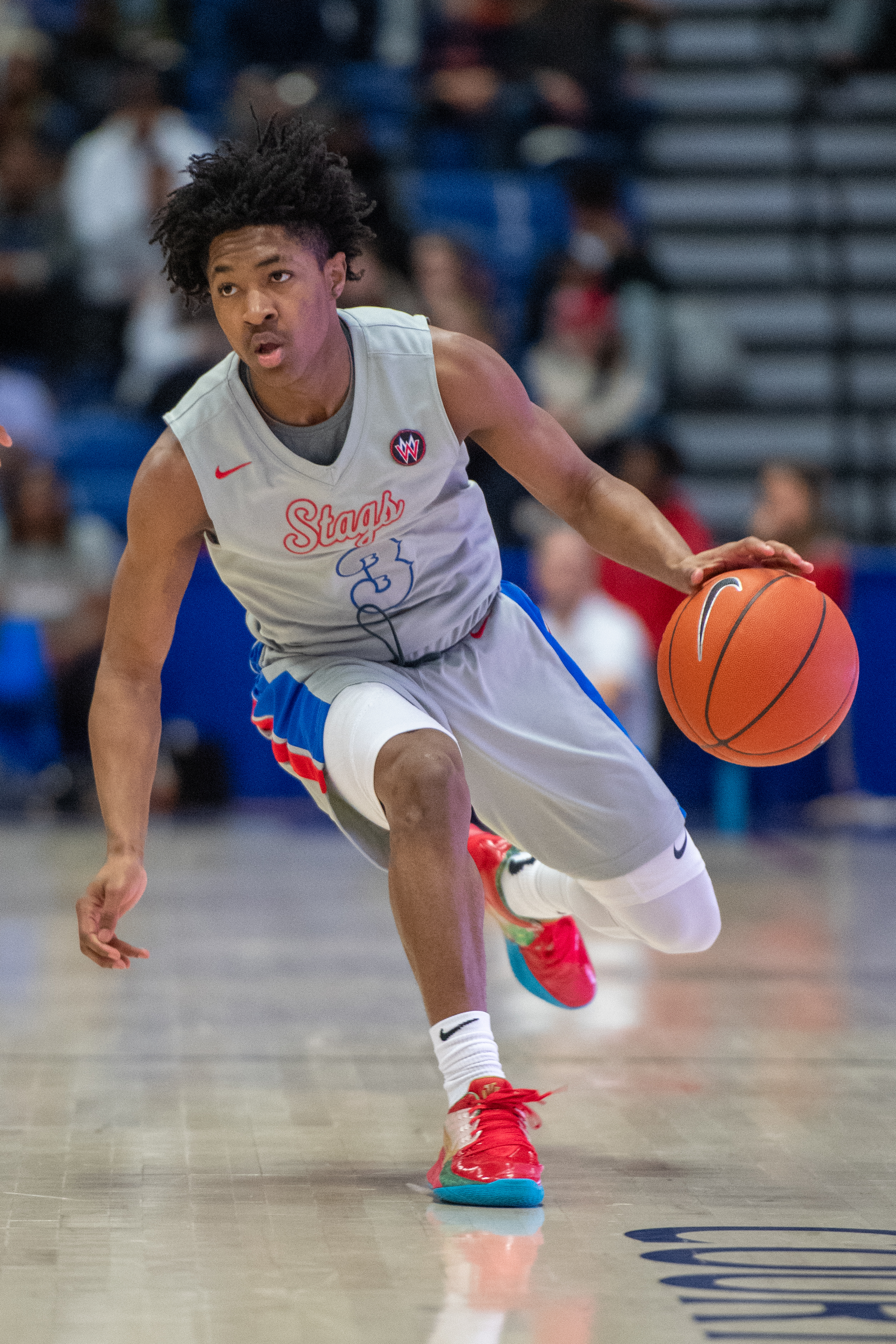
- Hawkins in 2020

No. 3 – Neftçi
- Position: Point guard
- League: Azerbaijan Basketball League

Personal information
- Born: July 9, 2002 (age 24) Washington, D.C., U.S.
- Listed height: 5 ft 11 in (1.80 m)
- Listed weight: 165 lb (75 kg)

Career information
- High school: DeMatha Catholic (Hyattsville, Maryland)
- College: Howard (2021–2023); Minnesota (2023–2024); Texas Tech (2024–2025)
- NBA draft: 2025: undrafted
- Playing career: 2025–present

Career history
- 2025–2026: Start Lublin
- 2026: Atomerőmű SE
- 2026–present: Neftçi

Career highlights
- Polish Supercup winner (2025); First-team All-MEAC (2023); Second-team All-MEAC (2022); MEAC Rookie of the Year (2022)

Elijah Jamil Hawkins (born July 9, 2002) is an American professional basketball player for Neftçi of the Azerbaijan Basketball League. He played college basketball for the Howard Bison, Minnesota Golden Gophers and the Texas Tech Red Raiders.

== College career ==
=== Howard ===
Hawkins attended DeMatha Catholic High School in Hyattsville, Maryland. Following his high school career, Hawkins averaged 13.0 points, 5.6 assists, and 2.3 steals per game as a freshman at Howard. As a result, Hawkins was named the MEAC Rookie of the Year. The following season, he averaged 12.9 points, 3.7 rebounds, and 5.8 assists per game, helping lead Howard to the NCAA tournament and being named to the All-MEAC first team. Following the conclusion of the season, he entered the transfer portal.

=== Minnesota ===
On May 9, 2023, Hawkins announced that he would be transferring to the University of Minnesota to play for the Golden Gophers. On December 12, 2023, against IUPUI, Hawkins recorded 17 assists, setting the Minnesota single-game record for assists. Against Maryland on January 7, 2024, he tallied ten points, nine assists and six steals, helping Minnesota defeat Maryland for the first time since 2017. On April 22, 2024, Hawkins announced he will be entering the transfer portal for a second time.

=== Texas Tech ===
On May 3, 2024, Hawkins officially signed with Texas Tech University to play for the Red Raiders.

== Professional career ==
On August 5, 2025, he signed with Start Lublin of the Polish Basketball League (PLK).

On January 19, 2026, he signed with Atomerőmű SE of the NB I/A.

== Career statistics ==
Legend
GP	Games played	GS	Games started	MPG	Minutes per game
FG%	Field goal percentage	3P%	3-point field goal percentage	FT%	Free throw percentage
RPG	Rebounds per game	APG	Assists per game	SPG	Steals per game
BPG	Blocks per game	PPG	Points per game	**Bold**	Career high

=== College ===
Year	Team	GP	GS	MPG	FG%	3P%	FT%	RPG	APG	SPG	BPG	PPG
2021–22	Howard	28	26	29.8	.377	.297	.793	**3.8**	5.6	**2.3**	.1	**13.0**
2022–23	Howard	31	29	29.6	**.441**	**.466**	.759	3.6	6.0	1.7	.0	12.9
2023–24	Minnesota	33	33	**33.3**	.393	.364	.784	3.6	**7.5**	1.6	**.2**	9.5
2024–25	Texas Tech	**35**	**34**	31.9	.323	.316	**.842**	3.5	6.5	1.5	.1	9.1
Career		127	122	31.2	.382	.357	.791	3.6	6.4	1.8	.1	11.0
