= Vincent Grier =

American basketball player

Vince Grier
Truman Bulldogs
- Title: Assistant coach
- League: GLVC

Personal information
- Born: March 14, 1983 (age 43) Charlotte, North Carolina, U.S.
- Listed height: 6 ft 5 in (1.96 m)
- Listed weight: 207 lb (94 kg)

Career information
- High school: Bonner Academy (Raleigh, North Carolina)
- College: Charlotte (2002–2003); Utah Tech (2003–2004); Minnesota (2004–2006)
- NBA draft: 2006: undrafted
- Playing career: 2006–2014
- Position: Shooting guard / small forward

Career history

Playing
- 2006–2007: Sioux Falls Skyforce
- 2007–2008: BCM Gravelines
- 2008–2009: Cholet Basket
- 2010: Mersin Büyükşehir Belediyesi
- 2010: Applied Science University
- 2010–2012: Mersin Büyükşehir Belediyesi
- 2012–2013: Pi Koleji Ankara
- 2013: BC Orchies
- 2013–2014: Maliye Milli Piyango
- 2014: Caneros de La Romana

Coaching
- 2017–2018: UIS (assistant)
- 2021–2022: Western Carolina (graduate assistant)
- 2024–present: Truman (assistant)

Career highlights
- First-team All-Big Ten – Coaches (2005); Second-team All-Big Ten – Media (2005)
Medals
Men's basketball
Representing United States
Summer Universiade
Gold medal – first place	2005 Izmir	National team

Vincent Grier (born March 14, 1983) is an American former basketball player and current assistant coach for the Truman Bulldogs. He played college basketball for the Minnesota Golden Gophers. He has scored 1,118 points, but did not play during his junior season, due to an injury.

He played for Minnesota after transferring from the University of North Carolina at Charlotte in 2003. He led the Gophers in scoring for two consecutive seasons, including a trip to the NCAA Tournament that resulted in a first-round loss to Iowa State. He was signed by the 2006 NBA champions Miami Heat.

Since graduating from Minnesota, Grier has played professionally in Europe. He was signed by French club Cholet Basket for the 2008–09 season. Previously, he had played for BCM Gravelines.
