= Fort Worth Flyers =

- League: NBA Development League
- Founded: 2005
- Folded: 2007
- History: Fort Worth Flyers; 2005–2007
- Arena: Fort Worth Convention Center
- Location: Fort Worth, Texas
- Team colors: Light blue, feldspar, brown and navy blue
- Head coach: Sidney Moncrief
- Ownership: David Kahn; Southwest Basketball, LLC
- Affiliations: Charlotte Bobcats, Dallas Mavericks, Golden State Warriors, Los Angeles Lakers, Philadelphia 76ers, Portland Trail Blazers
- Championships: 0
- Division/conference titles: 1 (2005–06)

The Fort Worth Flyers were a minor league basketball team in the NBA Development League (D-League) based in Fort Worth, Texas. They began play in the 2005–06 season and were shut down for the 2007–08 season.

== Franchise history ==
In 2005, Southwest Basketball, LLC led by David Kahn was granted permission by the recently rebranded NBA Development League (NBA D-League) to operate four new teams. Southwest Basketball then purchased and relocated three existing franchises while launching one expansion team, the Fort Worth Flyers. The team introduced its logo of a blue capital "F", reminiscent of a biplane, over a basketball.

The team began play in 2005–06 as an expansion franchise with Sam Vincent as coach. They were the D-League's regular season champions, finishing 28–20, but lost the championship game to the Albuquerque Thunderbirds by a score of 119–108. Vincent left after the season and was succeeded by Sidney Moncrief.

The following season, they finished in third place in the Eastern Division with a 29–21 record and lost the Eastern Division semifinal game to the Sioux Falls Skyforce 128–105.

The team did not return for the 2007–08 season as they were not profitable for Southwest Basketball, LLC. There was talk of the Flyers moving to Reno, Nevada, and of the D-League placing another team in Fort Worth, citing their proximity to the Dallas Mavericks. The D-League returned to the metroplex in 2010 with the Texas Legends, affiliated with the Mavericks.

== Season-by-season ==
| Season | Division | Regular season | | | | Playoffs |
| Season | Division | Finish | Wins | Losses | Pct. | Playoffs |
|---|---|---|---|---|---|---|
Fort Worth Flyers
| 2005–06 | | 1st | 28 | 20 | .583 | Won Semifinals (Roanoke) 87–78; Lost D-League Finals (Albuquerque) 119–108 |
| 2006–07 | Eastern | 3rd | 29 | 21 | .580 | Lost Semifinals (Sioux Falls) 128–105 |
| Regular season record | | | 57 | 41 | .582 | |
| Playoff record | | | 1 | 2 | .333 | |

== Notable players ==
- Maurice Ager
- Deji Akindele
- Kelenna Azubuike
- J. J. Barea
- Chris Copeland
- Bobby Jones
- Pops Mensah-Bonsu
- Jamario Moon
- Jeremy Richardson
- Luke Schenscher
- Ime Udoka
- Martell Webster
- Louis Williams
- Ha Seung-jin

== NBA affiliates ==
- Charlotte Bobcats (2006–2007)
- Dallas Mavericks (2005–2007)
- Golden State Warriors (2005–2006)
- Los Angeles Lakers (2005–2006)
- Philadelphia 76ers (2006–2007)
- Portland Trail Blazers (2005–2006)
