= Yakhouba Diawara =

French basketball player (born 1982)

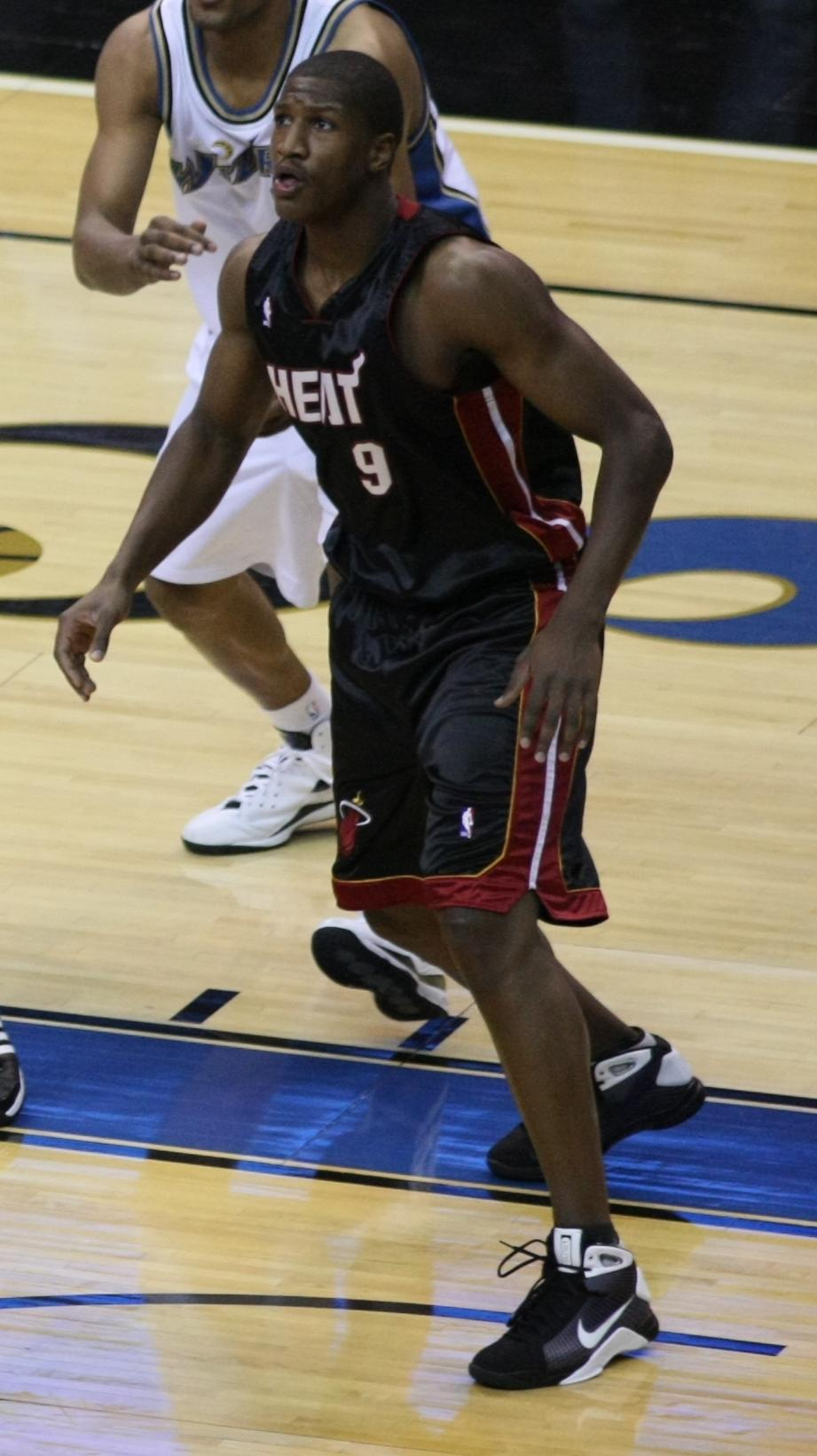
- Diawara with the Miami Heat in 2010

Personal information
- Born: 29 August 1982 (age 44) Paris, France
- Listed height: 6 ft 7 in (2.01 m)
- Listed weight: 225 lb (102 kg)

Career information
- High school: Tremblay-en-France (Paris, France)
- College: Southern Idaho (2001–2003); Pepperdine (2003–2005)
- NBA draft: 2005: undrafted
- Playing career: 2000–2020
- Position: Small forward / shooting guard
- Number: 5, 9

Career history
- 2000–2001, 2005–2006: JDA Dijon
- 2006: Climamio Bologna
- 2006–2008: Denver Nuggets
- 2008–2010: Miami Heat
- 2010–2011: Enel Brindisi
- 2011–2012: Cimberio Varese
- 2012–2013: Umana Reyer Venezia
- 2013–2014: BCM Gravelines
- 2014–2015: Cimberio Varese
- 2015–2016: Limoges
- 2017: Juvecaserta Basket
- 2017–2018: Pistoia Basket 2000
- 2018–2019: ESSM Le Portel

Career highlights
- First-team All-WCC (2004)
- Stats at NBA.com
- Stats at Basketball Reference
Medals
Men's basketball
Representing France
FIBA Europe Under-18 Championship
Gold medal – first place	2000 Croatia	U-18 Team
FIBA Europe Under-20 Championship
Bronze medal – third place	2002 Lithuania	U-20 Team

Yakhouba Diawara (born August 29, 1982) is a French former professional basketball player. He played college basketball in the United States for the Pepperdine Waves.

== Early career ==
Diawara started his career with French team JDA Dijon, and after his first season in the European League, Diawara decided to attend college in the United States. He first attended junior college at Southern Idaho, playing 63 games and averaging 12.1 points, 6.8 rebounds, 1.0 assists and 24.1 minutes while shooting 54.2 percent from the floor, 31.8 percent from three-point range and 58.6 percent from the free throw line. After two years, he transferred to Pepperdine University, where he averaged 15.5 points, 6.0 rebounds, 1.0 assists and 32.5 minutes for the Waves, while shooting 45.6 percent from the floor, 34.3 percent from three-point range and 65 percent from the free throw line earning first-team All-West Coast Conference honors as a junior.

== Professional career ==
Diawara went undrafted after graduating from Pepperdine and signed with Dijon again. In February 2006, he moved to Italian team Climamio Bologna. He was signed by the Denver Nuggets on 26 July 2006. He signed with the Miami Heat on 7 August 2008.

On 24 July 2010 Diawara signed with Enel Brindisi in Italy. For the 2011–12 season, he signed a one-year deal with Pallacanestro Varese. On 21 July 2012 he signed with another Italian team, Umana Reyer Venezia. He left Venezia on 16 July 2013. In September 2013, he signed a one-year deal with BCM Gravelines, however, he parted ways with them on 10 March 2014. On 21 August 2014 he returned to Cimberio Varese for the 2014–15 season.

On 28 September 2015 Diawara signed with the Memphis Grizzlies, returning to the NBA for the first time since 2010. However, he was waived on 24 October after appearing in six preseason games. On 2 November he signed with Limoges for the rest of the 2015–16 season.

On 16 January 2017 Diawara signed with Italian club Juvecaserta Basket for the rest of the 2016–17 LBA season.

On 17 December 2017 Diawara signed a one-week tryout contract with Italian club Pistoia Basket 2000. Four days later Pistoia announced that Diawara has passed the tryout period with the team and signed a deal for the rest of the 2017–18 LBA season.

== Personal life ==
Diawara is the youngest of Bintou and Ansoumane Diawara's four children, having two sisters (Kankou and Fatoumata) and one brother (Sourakhata). He is fluent in French, Wolof, English, and Italian.

== NBA career statistics ==
Legend
GP	Games played	GS	Games started	MPG	Minutes per game
FG%	Field goal percentage	3P%	3-point field goal percentage	FT%	Free throw percentage
RPG	Rebounds per game	APG	Assists per game	SPG	Steals per game
BPG	Blocks per game	PPG	Points per game	**Bold**	Career high

=== Regular season ===
Year	Team	GP	GS	MPG	FG%	3P%	FT%	RPG	APG	SPG	BPG	PPG
2006–07	Denver	**64**	19	**18.4**	.342	.288	.660	**1.7**	**.9**	**.5**	**.1**	**4.4**
2007–08	Denver	54	14	10.0	**.410**	**.318**	**.710**	1.1	.7	.1	**.1**	2.8
2008–09	Miami	63	**21**	13.5	.350	.313	.526	1.3	.4	.2	**.1**	3.4
2009–10	Miami	6	2	7.3	.200	.167	.000	.7	.5	.2	.0	.8
Career		187	56	14.0	.357	.301	.650	1.4	.7	.3	.1	3.5

=== Playoffs ===
Year	Team	GP	GS	MPG	FG%	3P%	FT%	RPG	APG	SPG	BPG	PPG
2007	Denver	1	0	1.0	.000	.000	.000	.0	.0	.0	.0	.0
2008	Denver	3	0	2.7	**.400**	.000	.000	.3	.0	.0	.0	**1.3**
2009	Miami	**5**	0	**4.2**	.333	.000	.000	**1.0**	.0	**.2**	.0	.4
Career		9	0	3.3	.375	.000	.000	.7	.0	.1	.0	.7
