= NBA all-time teams =

NBA all-time teams may refer to:

- Top 10 Teams in NBA History
- NBA anniversary teams
