= Bob Cousy =

American basketball player and coach (born 1928)

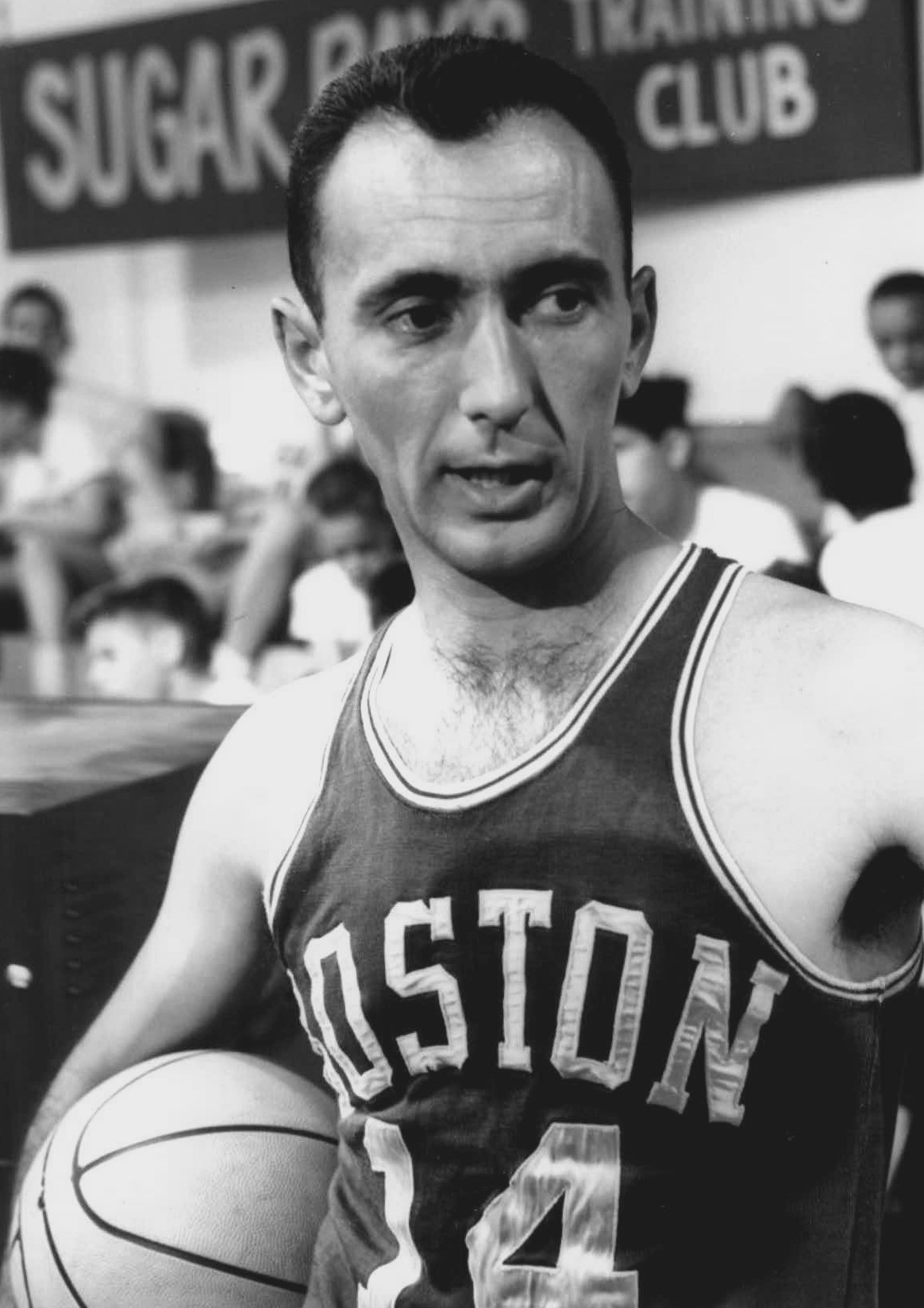
- Cousy with the Boston Celtics, c. 1959–1963

Personal information
- Born: August 9, 1928 (age 98) New York City, New York, U.S.
- Listed height: 6 ft 1 in (1.85 m)
- Listed weight: 175 lb (79 kg)

Career information
- High school: Andrew Jackson (Queens, New York)
- College: Holy Cross (1946–1950)
- NBA draft: 1950: 1st round, 3rd overall pick
- Drafted by: Tri-Cities Blackhawks
- Playing career: 1950–1963, 1969–1970
- Position: Point guard
- Number: 14, 19
- Coaching career: 1963–1973

Career history

Playing
- 1950–1963: Boston Celtics
- 1969–1970: Cincinnati Royals

Career highlights
- 6× NBA champion (1957, 1959–1963); NBA Most Valuable Player (1957); 13× NBA All-Star (1951–1963); 2× NBA All-Star Game MVP (1954, 1957); 10× All-NBA First Team (1952–1961); 2× All-NBA Second Team (1962, 1963); 8× NBA assists leader (1953–1960); NBA anniversary team (25th, 35th, 50th, 75th); No. 14 retired by Boston Celtics; NCAA champion (1947); Consensus first-team All-American (1950); Second-team All-American – AP, UPI, Look (1949); Third-team All-American – AP (1948); No. 17 retired by Holy Cross Crusaders; Presidential Medal of Freedom (2019)

Career NBA statistics
- Points: 16,960 (18.4 ppg)
- Rebounds: 4,786 (5.2 rpg)
- Assists: 6,955 (7.5 apg)
- Stats at NBA.com
- Stats at Basketball Reference
- Basketball Hall of Fame
- Collegiate Basketball Hall of Fame

Robert Joseph Cousy (/ˈkuːzi/ KOO-zee, born August 9, 1928) is an American former professional basketball player. He played point guard for the Boston Celtics from 1950 to 1963, and briefly with the Cincinnati Royals during the 1969–70 season. A 13-time NBA All-Star and 1957 NBA Most Valuable Player (MVP), Cousy was a core piece during the early half of the Celtics dynasty, winning six NBA championships during his 13-year tenure with the Celtics. Nicknamed "The Houdini of the Hardwood", Cousy was the NBA assists leader for eight consecutive seasons, introducing a new blend of ball-handling and passing skills to the NBA. He is regarded as the first great point guard of the NBA, and was the first to reach the 4,000, 5,000, and 6,000 career assists milestones.

Making his high school varsity squad as a junior, Cousy went on to earn a scholarship to the College of the Holy Cross, where he led the Crusaders to berths in the 1948 NCAA Tournament and the 1950 NCAA Tournament, while winning NCAA All-American honors for three seasons. Cousy entered the 1950 NBA draft and was initially drafted by the Tri-Cities Blackhawks as the third overall pick in the first round, but after he refused to report he was picked up by Boston. Following his playing career with the Celtics he served as a college basketball coach and an NBA head coach for the Cincinnati Royals.

Upon his election to the Naismith Memorial Basketball Hall of Fame in 1971 the Celtics retired his No. 14 jersey and hung it in the rafters of the Garden. Cousy was named to the NBA 25th Anniversary Team in 1971, the NBA 35th Anniversary Team in 1981, the NBA 50th Anniversary All-Time Team in 1996, and the NBA 75th Anniversary Team in 2021 making him one of only four players that were selected to each of those teams. As of 2026, he is the only one of those four still alive. He was also the first president of the National Basketball Players Association. On August 22, 2019, he was awarded the Presidential Medal of Freedom by President Donald Trump.

== Early life ==
Cousy was the only son of poor French immigrants living in New York City. He grew up in the Yorkville neighborhood of Manhattan's East Side, in the midst of the Great Depression. His father Joseph was a cab driver, who earned extra income by moonlighting. The elder Cousy was born in Belfort, France, and grew up in Alsace–Lorraine (then a disputed German territory), unwillingly serving in the Imperial German Army during World War I. Shortly after the war, his first wife died of pneumonia, leaving behind a young daughter. He married Juliette Corlet, a secretary and French teacher from Dijon. They lived on a potato farm in Lachapelle-sous-Rougemont before immigrating to the United States when Juliette was pregnant with Bob. At the time of the 1930 census, the family was renting an apartment in Astoria, Queens, for $50 per month. The younger Cousy spoke French for the first five years of his life, and started to speak English only after entering primary school. He spent his early days playing stickball in a multicultural environment, regularly playing with Black, Jewish and other ethnic minority children. These experiences ingrained him with a strong anti-racist sentiment, an attitude he prominently promoted during his professional career. When he was 12, his family moved to a rented house in St. Albans, Queens. That summer, the elder Cousy put a $500 down payment for a $4,500 house four blocks away. He rented out the bottom two floors of the three-story building to tenants to help make his mortgage payments on time.

Cousy took up basketball at the age of 13 as a student at St. Pascal's elementary school, and was "immediately hooked". The following year, he entered Andrew Jackson High School in St Albans. His basketball success was not immediate, and in fact he was cut from the school team in his first year. Later that year, he joined the St. Albans Lindens of the Press League, a basketball league sponsored by the Long Island Press, where he began to develop his basketball skills and gained much-needed experience. The next year, however, he was again cut during the tryouts for the school basketball team.

That same year, he fell out of a tree and broke his right hand. The injury forced him to play left-handed until his hand healed, making him effectively ambidextrous. In retrospect, he described this accident as "a fortunate event" and cited it as a factor in making him more versatile on the court. During a Press League game, the high school basketball coach saw him play. He was impressed by the budding star's two-handed ability and invited Cousy to come to practice the following day to try out for the junior varsity team. He did well enough to become a permanent member of the JV squad. He continued to practice day and night, and by his junior year was sure he was going to be promoted to the varsity; but failing his citizenship course made him ineligible for the first semester. He joined the varsity squad midway through the season, however, scoring 28 points in his first game. He had no intention of attending college, but after he started to make a name for himself on the basketball court he started to focus on improving in both academics and basketball skills to make it easier for him to get into college.

He again excelled in basketball his senior year, leading his team to the Queens divisional championship and amassing more points than any other New York City high school basketball player. He was even named captain of the Journal-American All-Scholastic team. He then began to plan for college. His family had wanted him to attend a Catholic school, and he wanted to go somewhere outside New York City. Boston College recruited him, and he considered accepting the BC offer, but it had no dormitories, and he was not interested in being a commuter student. Soon afterward, he received an offer from the College of the Holy Cross in Worcester, Massachusetts, about forty miles (64 kilometers) west of Boston. He was impressed by the school, and accepted the basketball scholarship it offered him. He spent the summer before matriculating working at Tamarack Lodge in the Catskill Mountains and playing in a local basketball league along with a number of established college players.

== College career ==
Cousy was one of six freshmen on the Holy Cross Crusaders' varsity basketball team in 1946–47. From the start of the season, coach Doggie Julian chose to play the six freshmen off the bench in a two-team system, so that each player would get some time on the court. As members of the "second team", they would come off the bench nine and a half minutes into the game, where they would relieve the "first team" starters. They would sometimes get to play as much as a third or even half of the game, but even at that Cousy was so disappointed with the lack of playing time that he went to the campus chapel after practice to pray that Julian would give him more of a chance to show off his talents on the court. Early in the season, however, he got into trouble with Julian, who accused him of being a showboater. Even as late as that 1946–47 season, basketball was a static game, depending on slow, deliberate player movement and flat-footed shots. Far different was Cousy's up-tempo, streetball-like game, marked by ambidextrous finesse play and notable for behind-the-back dribbling and no-look, behind-the-back and half-court passing. Even so, he had enough playing time in games to score 227 points for the season, finishing with the third-highest total on the team. Led by stars George Kaftan and Joe Mullaney, the Crusaders finished the 1946–47 basketball season 24–3.

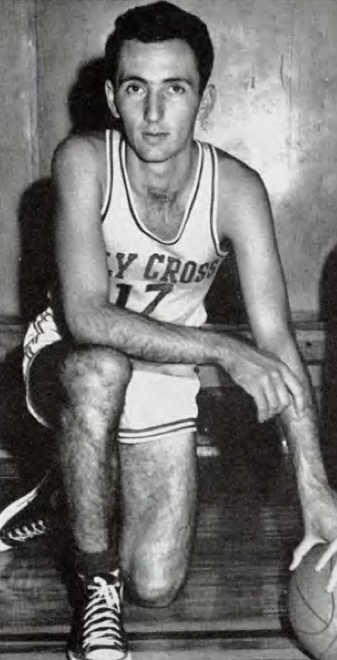
Cousy as a senior at Holy Cross

On the basis of that record, Holy Cross got into the 1947 NCAA Tournament as the last seed in the then only eight-team tournament. In the first game, they defeated Navy 55–47 in front of a sell-out crowd at Madison Square Garden. Mullaney led the team in scoring with 18 points, thanks to Navy coach Ben Carnevale's decision to have his players back off from Mullaney, who was reputed as being more of a playmaker than a shooter. In the semifinal game, the Crusaders faced CCNY, coached by Nat Holman, one of the game's earliest innovators. Led by Kaftan's 30 points, Holy Cross easily defeated the Beavers 60–45. In the championship game, the Crusaders faced Oklahoma, coached by Bruce Drake, in another sold-out game at Madison Square Garden. Kaftan followed up his 30-point semifinal heroics with a mere 18 points in the title game, which was far more than enough for the team to defeat the Sooners 58–47. Cousy played poorly, however, scoring only four points on 2-for-13 shots. Holy Cross became the first New England college to win the NCAA tournament. On their arrival back in Worcester, the team was given a hero's welcome by about 10,000 cheering fans who met their train at Union Station.

The following season Julian limited Cousy's playing time, to the point that the frustrated sophomore contemplated transferring out of Holy Cross. Cousy wrote a letter to coach Joe Lapchick of St. John's University in New York, informing him that he was considering a transfer there. Lapchick wrote back to Cousy that he considered Julian "one of the finest basketball coaches in America" and that he believed Julian had no bad intentions in restricting his playing time. He told Cousy that Julian would use him more often during his later years with the team. Lapchick alerted Cousy that transferring was a very risky move: according to NCAA rules, the player would be required to sit out a year before becoming eligible to play for the school to which he transferred. Cousy still managed to lead the Crusaders in scoring and was an AP Third Team All American. Cousy again led the team in scoring in his junior year, and was named a Second Team All American by multiple services, including the AP.

During Cousy's senior year of 1949–1950, with 5 minutes to go and Holy Cross trailing in a game against Loyola of Chicago at Boston Garden, the crowd started to chant "We want Cousy!" until coach Julian relented. In these few minutes, Cousy scored 11 points and hit a game-winning buzzer-beater coming off a behind-the-back dribble. The performance established him as a team leader, and he then led Holy Cross to 26 straight wins and a Number 4 national ranking. He was a consensus First Team All-American, and led the team in scoring for the third straight season with 19.4 points per game. A three-time All-American, Cousy ended his college career in the 1950 NCAA Tournament, when Holy Cross fell to North Carolina State in an opening-round game at Madison Square Garden. CCNY would go on to win the tournament.

== Professional career ==
Highlight reel of Cousy's NBA career

=== Boston Celtics (1950–1963) ===
==== Early years (1950–1956) ====
Cousy turned pro and made himself available for the 1950 NBA draft. The Boston Celtics had just concluded the 1949–50 NBA season with a poor 22–46 win–loss record and had the first draft pick. It was strongly anticipated that they would draft the highly coveted local favorite Cousy. However, coach Red Auerbach snubbed him for center Charlie Share, saying: "Am I supposed to win, or please the local yokels?" The local press strongly criticized Auerbach, but other scouts were also skeptical about Cousy, viewing him as flamboyant but ineffective. One scout wrote in his report: "The first time he tries that fancy Dan stuff in this league, they'll cram the ball down his throat."

As a result, the Tri-Cities Blackhawks drafted Cousy, but the point guard was unenthusiastic about his new employer. Cousy was trying to establish a driving school in Worcester, Massachusetts and did not want to relocate to the Midwestern triangle of the three small towns of Moline, Rock Island and Davenport. As compensation for having to give up his driving school, Cousy demanded a salary of $10,000 from Blackhawks owner Ben Kerner. When Kerner offered him only $6,000, Cousy refused to report. Cousy was then picked up by the Chicago Stags, but when they folded, league Commissioner Maurice Podoloff declared three Stags available for a dispersal draft: team scoring leader Max Zaslofsky, Andy Phillip and Cousy. Celtics owner Walter A. Brown was one of the three club bosses invited. He later made it clear that he was hoping for Zaslofsky, would have tolerated Phillip, and did not want Cousy. When the Celtics drew Cousy, Brown confessed: "I could have fallen to the floor." Brown reluctantly gave him a $9,000 salary.

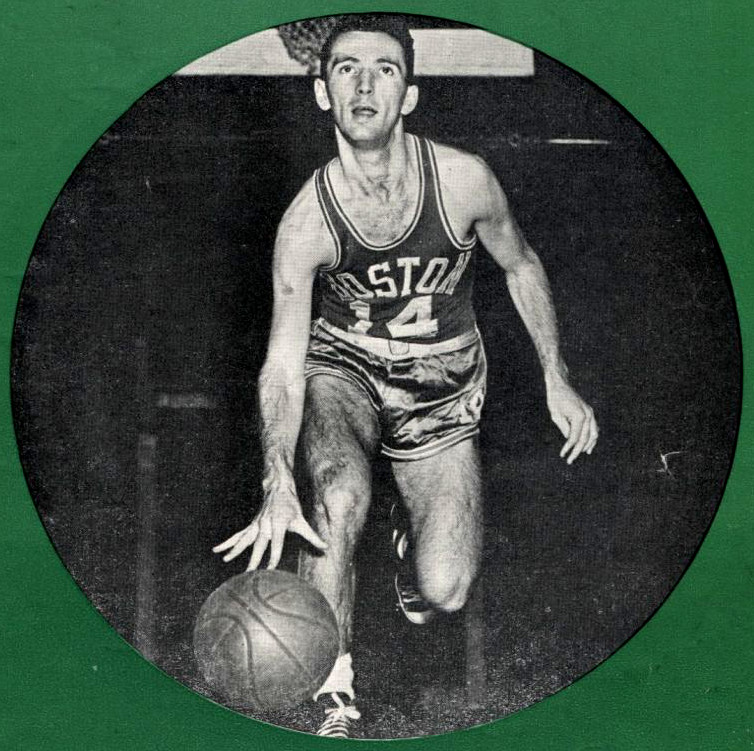
Cousy c. 1953

It was not long before both Auerbach and Brown changed their minds. With averages of 15.6 points, 6.9 rebounds and 4.9 assists a game, Cousy received the first of his 13 consecutive NBA All-Star selections and led a Celtics team with future Naismith Memorial Basketball Hall of Famers Ed Macauley and Bones McKinney to a 39–30 record in the 1950–51 NBA season. However, in the 1951 NBA Playoffs, the Celtics were beaten by the New York Knicks. With future Hall-of-Fame guard Bill Sharman on board the next season, Cousy averaged 21.7 points, 6.4 rebounds and 6.7 assists per game en route to his first All-NBA First Team nomination. Nonetheless, the Celtics lost to the Knicks in the 1952 NBA Playoffs.

In the following season, Cousy made further progress. Averaging 7.7 assists per game, he won the first of his eight consecutive assists titles. These numbers were made despite the fact that the NBA had not yet introduced the shot clock, making the game static and putting prolific assist givers at a disadvantage. Powered by Auerbach's quick fastbreak-dominated tactics, the Celtics won 46 games and beat the Syracuse Nationals 2–0 in the 1953 NBA Playoffs. Game 2 ended 111–105 in a 4-overtime thriller, in which Cousy had a much-lauded game. Despite having an injured leg, he scored 25 points after four quarters, scored 6 of his team's 9 points in the first overtime, hit a clutch free throw in the last seconds, and scored all 4 of Boston's points in the second overtime. He scored 8 more points in the third overtime, among them a 25-ft. buzzer beater. In the fourth overtime, he scored 9 of Boston's 12 points. Cousy played 66 minutes, and scored 50 points after making a still-standing record of 30 free throws in 32 attempts. This game is regarded by the NBA as one of the finest scoring feats ever, in line with Wilt Chamberlain's 100-point game. However, for the third time in a row, the Knicks beat Boston in the next round.

In the next three years, Cousy firmly established himself as one of the league's best point guards. Leading the league in assists all 3 seasons, and averaging 20 points and 7 rebounds, the versatile Cousy earned himself three more All-NBA First Team and All-Star honors, and was also Most Valuable Player of the 1954 NBA All-Star Game. In terms of playing style, Cousy introduced an array of visually attractive street basketball moves, described by the NBA as a mix of ambidextrous, behind-the-back dribbling and "no-look passes, behind-the-back feeds or half-court fastbreak launches". Cousy's modus operandi contrasted with the rest of the NBA, which was dominated by muscular low post scorers and deliberate set shooters. Soon, he was called "Houdini of the Hardwood" after the magician Harry Houdini. Cousy's crowd-pleasing and effective play drew the crowd into the Boston Garden and also won over coach Auerbach, who no longer saw him as a liability, but as an essential building block for the future.

The Celtics eventually added two talented forwards, future Hall-of-Famer Frank Ramsey and defensive specialist Jim Loscutoff. Along with Celtics colleague Bob Brannum, Loscutoff also became Cousy's unofficial bodyguard, retaliating against opposing players who would try to hurt him. The Celtics were unable to make their mark in the 1954 NBA Playoffs, 1955 NBA Playoffs, and 1956 NBA Playoffs, where they lost three times in a row against the Nationals. Cousy attributed the shortcomings to fatigue, stating: "We would get tired in the end and could not get the ball". As a result, Auerbach sought a defensive center who could get easy rebounds, initiate fast breaks and close out games.

==== Celtics dynasty years (1957–1963) ====
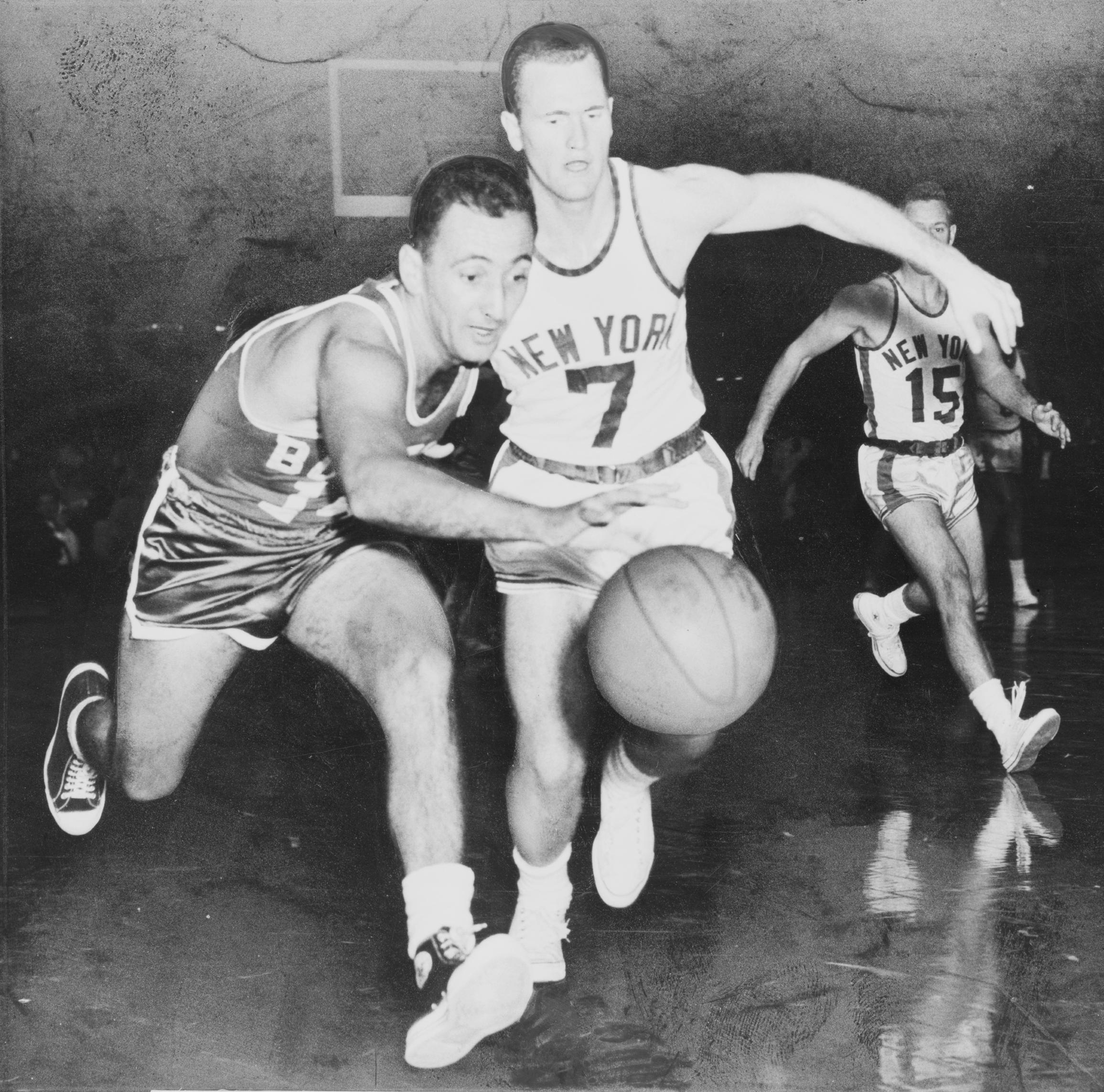
Cousy in 1960

Before the 1956–57 NBA season, Auerbach drafted two future Hall-of-Famers: forward Tom Heinsohn, and defensive center Bill Russell. Powered by these new players, the Celtics went 44–28 in the regular season, and Cousy averaged 20.6 points, 4.8 rebounds and a league-leading 7.5 assists, earning his first NBA Most Valuable Player Award; he also won his second NBA All-Star Game MVP award. The Celtics reached the 1957 NBA Finals, and powered by Cousy on offense and rugged center Russell on defense, they beat the Hawks 4–3, who were noted for future Hall-of-Fame power forward Bob Pettit and former teammates Macauley and Hagan. Cousy finally won his first title.

In the 1957–58 NBA season, Cousy had yet another highly productive year, with his 20.0 points, 5.5 rebounds and 8.6 assists per game leading to nominations into the All-NBA First Team and the All-Star team. He again led the NBA in assists. The Celtics reached the 1958 NBA Finals against the Hawks, but when Russell succumbed to a foot injury in Game 3, the Celtics faded and bowed out four games to two. This was the last losing NBA playoff series in which Cousy would play.

In the following 1958–59 NBA season, the Celtics got revenge on their opposition, powered by an inspired Cousy, who averaged 20.0 points, 5.5 rebounds and a league-high 8.6 assists a game, won another assists title and another pair of All-NBA First Team and All-Star team nominations. Late in the season, Cousy reasserted his playmaking dominance by setting an NBA record with 28 assists in a game against the Minneapolis Lakers. While that record was broken 19 years later, Cousy also set a record for 19 assists in a half which has never been broken. The Celtics stormed through the playoffs and, behind Cousy's 51 total assists (still a record for a four-game NBA Finals series), defeated the Minneapolis Lakers in the first 4–0 sweep ever in the 1959 NBA Finals.

In the 1959–60 NBA season, Cousy was again productive, his 19.4 points, 4.7 rebounds and 9.5 assists per game earning him his eighth consecutive assists title and another joint All-NBA First Team and All-Star team nomination. Again, the Celtics defeated all opposition and won the 1960 NBA Finals 4–3 against the Hawks. A year later, the 32-year-old Cousy scored 18.1 points, 4.4 rebounds and 7.7 assists per game, winning another pair of All-NBA First Team and All-Star nominations, but failing to win the assists crown after eight consecutive seasons. However, the Celtics won the 1961 NBA Finals after convincingly beating the Hawks 4–1.

In the 1961–62 NBA season, the aging Cousy slowly began to fade statistically, averaging 15.7 points, 3.5 rebounds and 7.8 assists, and was voted into the All-NBA Second Team after ten consecutive First Team nominations. Still, he enjoyed a satisfying postseason, winning the 1962 NBA Finals after 4–3 battles against two upcoming teams, the Philadelphia Warriors and Los Angeles Lakers. The Finals series against the Lakers was especially dramatic, because Lakers guard Frank Selvy failed to make a last-second buzzer beater in Game 7 which would have won the title. Finally, in the 1962–63 NBA season, the last of his career, Cousy averaged 13.2 points, 2.5 rebounds and 6.8 assists, and collected one last All-Star and All-NBA Second Team nomination. In the 1963 NBA Finals, the Celtics again won 4–2 against the Lakers, and Cousy finished his career on a high note: in the fourth quarter of Game 6, Cousy sprained an ankle and had to be helped to the bench. He went back in with Boston up 1. Although he did not score again, he was credited with providing an emotional lift that carried the Celtics to victory, 112–109. The game ended with Cousy throwing the ball into the rafters.

=== Retirement ===
At age 34, Cousy held his retirement ceremony on March 17, 1963, in a packed Boston Garden. The event became known as the Boston Tear Party, when the crowd's response overwhelmed Cousy, left him speechless, and caused his planned 7-minute farewell to go on for 20. Joe Dillon, a water worker from South Boston, Massachusetts, and a devoted Celtics fan, screamed "We love ya, Cooz", breaking the tension and the crowd went into cheers. As a testament to Cousy's legacy, President John F. Kennedy wired to Cousy: "The game bears the indelible stamp of your rare skills and competitive daring, and it will serve as a living reminder of your long and illustrious career so long as it is played."

=== Cincinnati Royals (1969–1970) ===
During the 1969–70 NBA season, the then 41-year-old Cousy, who was also the head coach for the Royals, made a late-season comeback as a player for seven games. Cousy averaged 0.7 points per game for the now Sacramento Kings.

== Player profile ==
"He was the ultimate creator," "Let me put it in perspective -- if you think Magic Johnson could pass, if you think John Stockton can pass, multiply them by 10 and you have Bob Cousy."

— Tom Heinsohn

Cousy's was the NBA's premier point guard throughout the 1950s, he earned this title with his creative ball-handling and passing abilities which transformed the way the game was played. His flashy style has led to him being described as the leagues first showman and helping the sport rise in popularity. Throughout his career Cousy was known for his playmaking abilities, being known for his great court vision and anticipation. On top of this he is credited with revolutionizing playmaking techniques in the NBA, as he incorporated no-look passes and behind-the-back dribbles to his game, which were uncommon in the slower-paced, set-shot oriented league of the early 1950s. Cousy’s teammate Bill Sharman compared Cousy to Magic Johnson stating: “Cousy was a lot like Magic, in that he was an innovator and his first instincts were to get you a good shot. On the fast break, he was an artist, inventing something new – he was way ahead of his time." His official biography on the Naismith Memorial Basketball Hall of Fame describes him as one of the "best playmakers ever." His teammate Tom Heinsohn later told the Boston Herald in 1983 "What Bill Russell was on defense, that’s what Cousy was on offense — a magician. Once that ball reached his hands, the rest of us just took off, never bothering to look back. We didn’t have to. He’d find us. When you got into a position to score, the ball would be there." Cousy was also known as one of the best ball handlers of his era, having the ability to keep the ball away from defenders to allow plays to develop. Then if no one could get open, he was able burn opponents with outside shots or drives to the hoop. As for his physical traits Cousy stood a 6’1 tall having large hands, sloping shoulders, and sturdy legs.

== NBA career statistics ==
Legend
GP	Games played	GS	Games started	MPG	Minutes per game
FG%	Field goal percentage	3P%	3-point field goal percentage	FT%	Free throw percentage
RPG	Rebounds per game	APG	Assists per game	SPG	Steals per game
BPG	Blocks per game	PPG	Points per game	**Bold**	Career high
†	Won an NBA championship	*	Led the league

=== Regular season ===
Year	Team	GP	MPG	FG%	FT%	RPG	APG	PPG
1950–51	Boston	69	—	.352	.756	**6.9**	4.9	15.6
1951–52	Boston	66*	40.6	.369	.808	6.4	6.7	**21.7**
1952–53	Boston	71	**41.5**	.352	.816	6.3	7.7*	19.8
1953–54	Boston	72	39.7	.385	.787	5.5	7.2*	19.2
1954–55	Boston	71	38.7	**.397**	.807	6.0	7.8*	21.2
1955–56	Boston	72	38.4	.360	.844	6.8	8.9*	18.8
1956–57†	Boston	64	36.9	.378	.821	4.8	7.5*	20.6
1957–58	Boston	65	34.2	.353	.850	5.0	7.1*	18.0
1958–59†	Boston	65	37.0	.384	.855	5.5	8.6*	20.0
1959–60†	Boston	75	34.5	.384	.792	4.7	**9.5***	19.4
1960–61†	Boston	**76**	32.5	.371	.779	4.4	7.7	18.1
1961–62†	Boston	75	28.2	.391	.754	3.5	7.8	15.7
1962–63†	Boston	**76**	26.0	**.397**	.735	2.5	6.8	13.2
1969–70	Cincinnati	7	4.9	.333	**1.000**	0.7	1.4	0.7
Career		924	35.3	.375	.803	5.2	7.5	18.4

=== Playoffs ===
Year	Team	GP	MPG	FG%	FT%	RPG	APG	PPG
1951	Boston	2	—	.214	.833	7.5	6.0	14.0
1952	Boston	3	**46.0**	.400	.932	4.0	6.3	**31.0**
1953	Boston	6	45.0	.383	.836	4.2	6.2	25.5
1954	Boston	6	43.3	.284	.800	5.3	6.3	21.0
1955	Boston	7	42.7	.381	**.958**	6.1	9.3	21.7
1956	Boston	3	41.3	**.500**	.920	**8.0**	8.7	26.3
1957†	Boston	10	44.0	.324	.747	6.1	9.3	20.2
1958	Boston	11	41.5	.342	.853	6.5	7.5	18.0
1959†	Boston	11	41.8	.326	.745	6.9	**10.8**	19.5
1960†	Boston	13	36.0	.305	.765	3.7	8.9	15.3
1961†	Boston	10	33.7	.340	.761	4.3	9.1	16.7
1962†	Boston	**14**	33.9	.357	.684	4.6	8.8	16.0
1963†	Boston	13	30.2	.353	.830	2.5	8.9	14.1
Career		109	38.5	.342	.801	5.0	8.6	18.5

== Coaching career ==
=== Boston College (1963–1969) ===
After retiring as a player, Cousy published his autobiography Basketball Is My Life in 1963, and in the same year became coach at Boston College. In the 1965 ECAC Holiday Basketball Festival at Madison Square Garden, Providence defeated Boston College 91–86 in the title game, when the Friars were led by Tourney MVP and All-American Jimmy Walker. Providence was coached by Joe Mullaney, who was Cousy's teammate at Holy Cross when the two men were players there on the same team in 1947. In his six seasons there, he had a record of 114 wins and 38 losses and was named New England Coach of the Year for 1968 and 1969. Cousy led the Eagles to three NIT appearances, including a berth in the 1969 NIT Championship and two National Collegiate Athletic Association tournaments, including the 1967 Eastern Regional Finals.

=== Cincinnati Royals / Kansas City-Omaha Kings (1969–1973) ===
Cousy grew bored with college basketball and returned to the NBA as coach of the Cincinnati Royals, team of fellow Hall-of-Fame point guard Oscar Robertson. He later said about this engagement, "I did it for the money. I was made an offer I couldn't refuse." He continued as coach of the team after it moved from Cincinnati to Kansas City-Omaha, but stepped down as the Kings' coach early in the 1973–74 NBA season with a 141–209 record.

== Coaching record ==
=== College coaching record ===
Record table
Season	Team	Overall	Conference	Standing	Postseason
Boston College Eagles (ECAC) (1963–1969)
1963–64	Boston College	10–11			
1964–65	Boston College	21–7			NIT First Round
1965–66	Boston College	21–5			NIT Quarterfinals
1966–67	Boston College	21–3			NCAA University Division Elite Eight
1967–68	Boston College	17–8			NCAA University Division First Round
1968–69	Boston College	24–4			NIT Runner-up
Boston College:		114–38			
Total:		114–38 (0.750)			
National champion Postseason invitational champion Conference regular season champion Conference regular season and conference tournament champion Division regular season champion Division regular season and conference tournament champion Conference tournament champion

=== NBA coaching record ===
Legend
Regular season	G	Games coached	W	Games won	L	Games lost	W–L %	Win–loss %
Playoffs	PG	Playoff games	PW	Playoff wins	PL	Playoff losses	PW–L %	Playoff win–loss %

Team	Year	G	W	L	W–L%	Finish	PG	PW	PL	PW–L%	Result
Cincinnati	1969–70	82	36	46	.439	5th in Eastern	—	—	—	—	Missed playoffs
Cincinnati	1970–71	82	33	49	.402	3rd in Central	—	—	—	—	Missed playoffs
Cincinnati	1971–72	82	30	52	.366	3rd in Central	—	—	—	—	Missed playoffs
Kansas City–Omaha	1972–73	82	36	46	.439	4th in Midwest	—	—	—	—	Missed playoffs
Kansas City–Omaha	1973–74	20	6	14	.300	(resigned)	—	—	—	—	—
Career		348	141	207	.405		—	—	—	—	—

== Legacy ==
The Boston Celtics retired the number-14 jersey with Bob Cousy's name.

In 1954, the NBA had no health benefits, pension plan, minimum salary, and the average player's salary was $8,000 ($82,000 in 2021 dollars) a season. To combat this, Cousy organized the National Basketball Players Association, the first trade union among those in the four major North American professional sports leagues. Cousy served as its first president until 1958.

In his 13-year, 924-game NBA playing career, Cousy finished with 16,960 points, 4,786 rebounds and 6,955 assists, translating to averages of 18.4 points, 5.2 rebounds and 7.5 assists per game. He was regarded as the first great point guard of the NBA, winning eight of the first 11 assist titles in the league, all of them en bloc, and had a highly successful career, winning six NBA titles, one MVP award, 13 All-Star appearances, 12 All-NBA First and Second Team call-ups, and two All-Star Game MVP awards. Cousy was one of four players–along with George Mikan, Bill Russell, and Bob Pettit–who were selected to all four NBA anniversary teams. With his eye-catching dribbling and unorthodox passing, Cousy popularized modern guard play and raised the profile of the Boston Celtics and the entire NBA. His fast-paced playing style was later emulated by the likes of Pete Maravich and Magic Johnson.

In recognition of his feats, Cousy was inducted into the Naismith Memorial Basketball Hall of Fame in 1971 and in 1963, the Celtics retired his uniform number, 14, the first of two numbers retired (the other was Ed Macauley's number 22). Celtics owner Walter Brown said: "The Celtics wouldn't be here without him [Cousy]. He made basketball in this town. If he had played in New York he would have been the biggest thing since [New York Yankees baseball legend] Babe Ruth. I think he is anyway." In addition, on May 11, 2006, ESPN.com rated Cousy as the fifth-greatest point guard of all time, lauding him as "ahead of his time with his ballhandling and passing skills" and pointing out he is one of only seven point guards ever to win an NBA Most Valuable Player award. He was also honored with the Sam Davis Memorial Award as the most valuable professional player of the year by the Metropolitan Basketball Writers Association–an award that predates the official NBA MVP by six years–in 1953, 1955, and 1957.

On November 16, 2008, Cousy's college uniform number, 17, was hoisted to the Hart Center rafters. During halftime of a game between the Holy Cross Crusaders and St. Joseph's Hawks, the uniform numbers of Cousy, George Kaftan, Togo Palazzi, and Tommy Heinsohn became the first to hang from the gymnasium's ceiling.

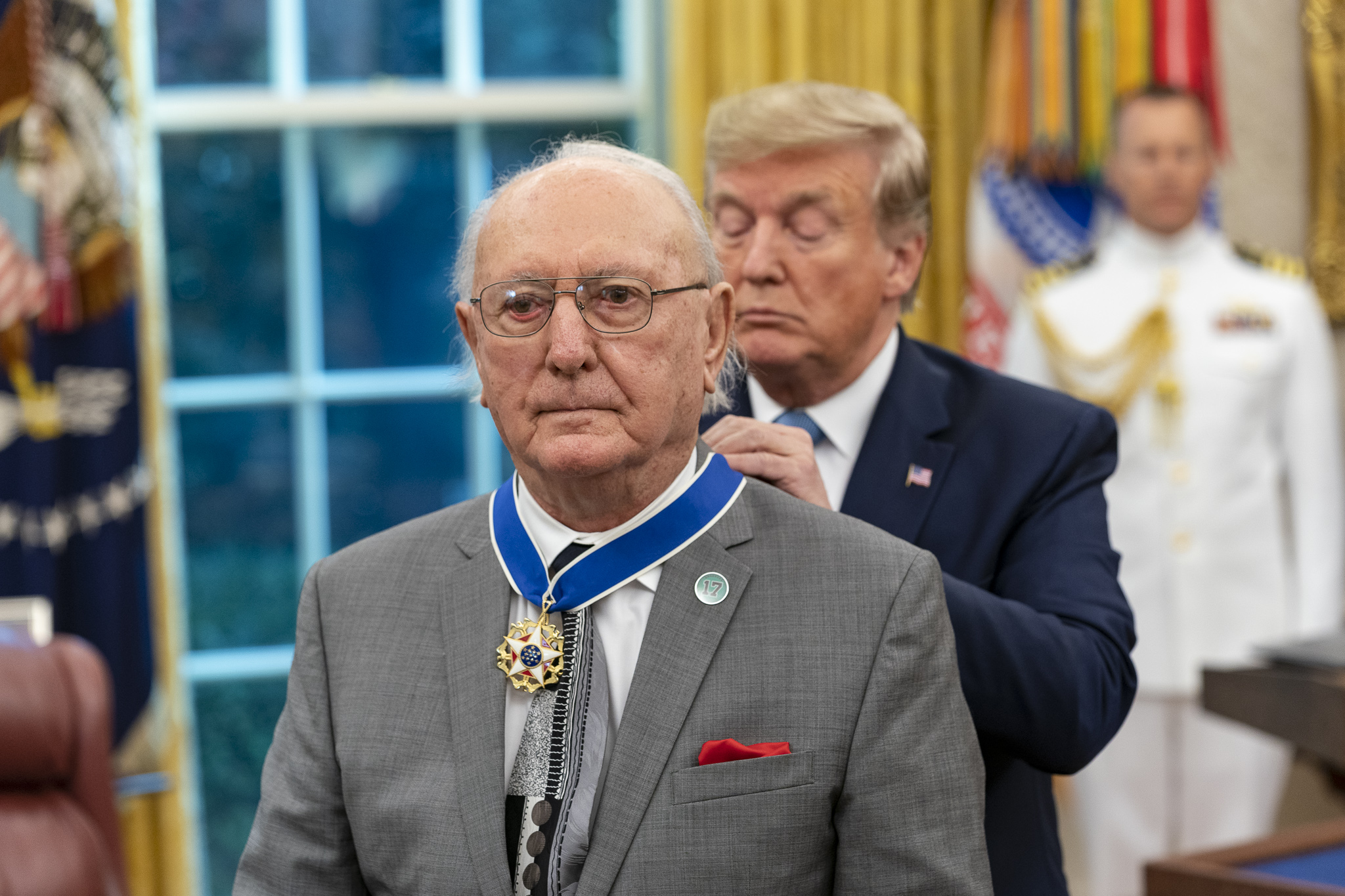
Cousy receiving the Presidential Medal of Freedom in 2019 from President Donald Trump

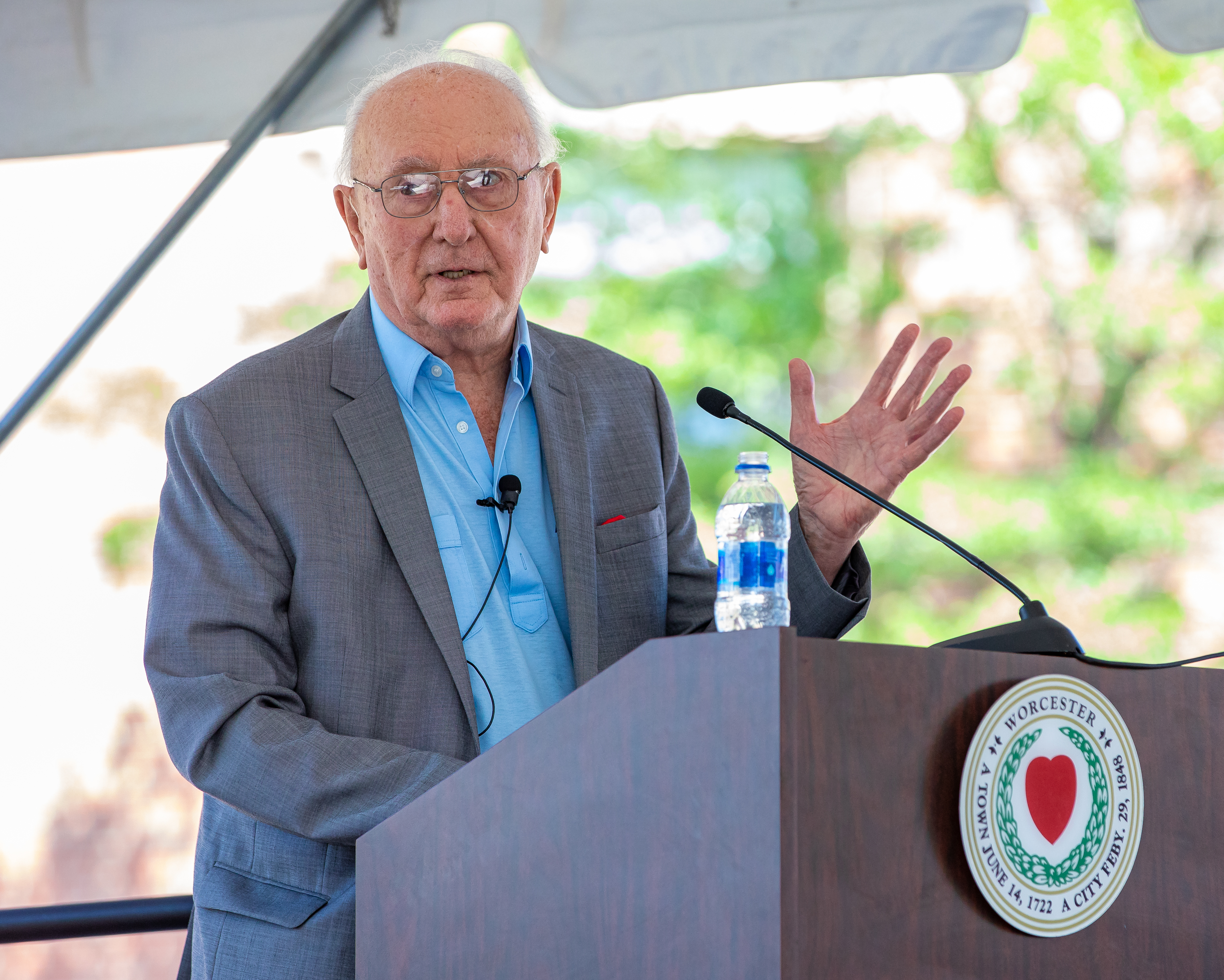
Cousy speaking at the June 2021 unveiling of a statue in his honor outside of the DCU Center in Worcester, Massachusetts

On July 1, 2019, Cousy informed The Boston Globe that he had received an official letter notifying him that he would receive the Presidential Medal of Freedom from President Donald Trump on August 22, 2019. He received the medal at a ceremony in the Oval Office. A statue of Cousy was installed outside the DCU Center in Worcester, Massachusetts (the current home venue of the Holy Cross basketball program). The statue of Cousy was dedicated in June 2021.

Cousy has been the recipient of several basketball awards being named after him. The Bob Cousy Award has been presented annually since 2004 by the Naismith Memorial Basketball Hall of Fame to the top men's collegiate point guard. In 2022, the NBA renamed its Eastern Conference championship trophy in honor of Cousy.

After the death of Bob Harrison in March 2024, Cousy became the oldest living NBA champion.

On December 22, 2025, his alma mater Holy Cross announced that they would be renaming their basketball court in his honor. A formal dedication ceremony will take place during Holy Cross's February 7, 2026 game vs. Lehigh.

== Off the court ==
=== Soccer league commissioner ===
Despite his unfamiliarity with the sport, Cousy was appointed Commissioner of the American Soccer League on December 19, 1974. His most notable act as commissioner was to declare the New York Apollo and Boston Astros co-champions after both teams played 67 minutes of extra time without resolution in the second and deciding leg of the league's championship series on September 20, 1975. He was relieved of his duties on December 1, 1979. Pennsylvania Stoners club owner Willie Ehrlich explained the dismissal by stating, "After five years as commissioner, Cousy still goes around telling people he knows nothing about soccer."

=== Personal life ===
Cousy married his college sweetheart, Missie Ritterbusch, in December 1950, six months after he graduated from Holy Cross. They lived in Worcester, Massachusetts, and had two daughters. His wife died on September 20, 2013, after suffering from dementia for several years.

Cousy was well-known, both on and off the court, for his public stance against racism, a result of his upbringing in a multicultural environment. In 1950, the Celtics played a game in the then-segregated city of Charlotte, North Carolina, and teammate Chuck Cooper—the first African-American in NBA history to be drafted—would have been denied a hotel room. Instead of taking the hotel room, Cousy insisted on travelling with Cooper on an uncomfortable overnight train. He described their visit to a segregated men's toilet—Cooper was prohibited from using the clean "for whites" bathroom and had to use the shabby "for colored" facility—as one of the most shameful experiences of his life. He also sympathized with the plight of black Celtics star Bill Russell, who was frequently a victim of racism.

He was close to his Celtics mentor, head coach Red Auerbach, and was one of the few permitted to call him "Arnold," his given name, instead of his nickname "Red".

In 1953, Cousy became a partner at Graylag Nature Preserve (then, Camp Graylag), a camp for boys in Pittsfield, New Hampshire. He transitioned it into a basketball camp, adding three collegiate regulation sized courts near the shore of Wild Goose Pond. During the summer leading up to his final season, he left Graylag only once, to recruit a high school basketball player to Boston College.

Cousy has released two books, the first one being an early autobiography titled Basketball is my life which was released in 1958 and was co-written with Al Hirshberg. Later on he released an acclaimed book on basketball titled Basketball Principles and Techniques.

Cousy has helped raise money for multiple charities in the Massachusetts area, and has prominently worked with the Big Brothers Big Sisters of Central Mass. & Metrowest organization, which helps mentor local youth. Following his retirement he also held basketball clinics in both Europe and Asia.

He was a color analyst on Celtics telecasts during the 1980s a position he held all the way till 2008 when he officially retired." In addition, he had a role in the 1994 basketball film Blue Chips, in which he played a college athletic director named Vic Roker.

He is currently a marketing consultant for the Celtics, and occasionally makes broadcast appearances with Mike Gorman (and with ex-Celtic teammate Tom Heinsohn prior to Heinsohn's death on November 9, 2020).

== Career highlights and awards ==
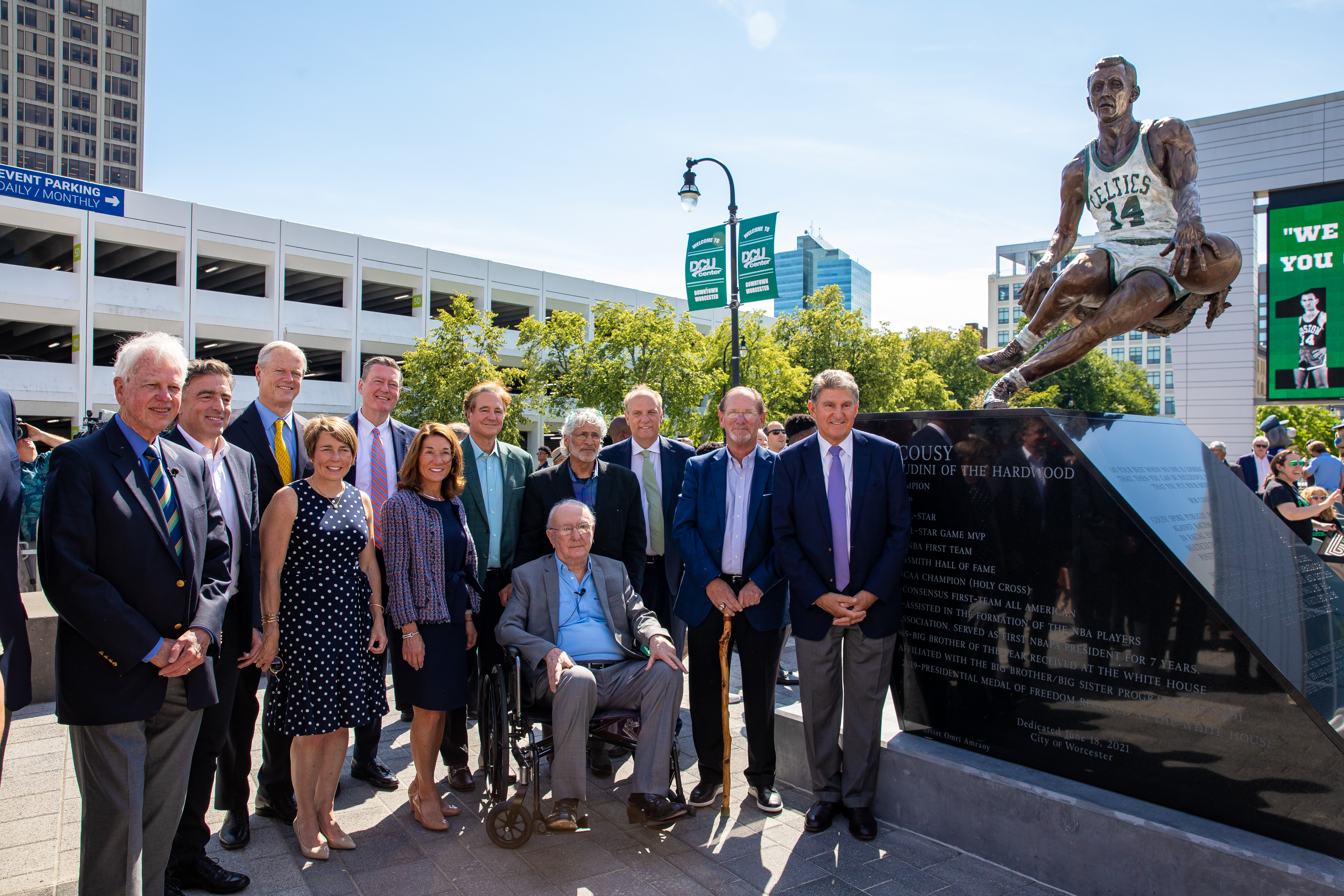
Cousy in 2021 with his statue outside the DCU Center in Worcester

=== NBA ===
- 6x NBA Champion: 1957, 1959, 1960, 1961, 1962, 1963
- NBA Most Valuable Player: 1957
- 3x Sam Davis Memorial Award (MBWA NBA MVP Award): 1953, 1955, 1957
- 13x NBA All-Star: 1951, 1952, 1953, 1954, 1955, 1956, 1957, 1958, 1959, 1960, 1961, 1962, 1963
- 2x NBA All-Star Game MVP: 1954, 1957
- 12x All-NBA Team selections:
  - 10x First Team: 1952, 1953, 1954, 1955, 1956, 1957, 1958, 1959, 1960, 1961
  - 2x Second Team: 1962, 1963
- 8× NBA assists leader: 1953, 1954, 1955, 1956, 1957, 1958, 1959, 1960
- NBA anniversary team: 25th, 35th, 50th, 75th
- No. 14 retired by Boston Celtics
- Naismith Memorial Basketball Hall of Fame: 1971
- The leagues Eastern Conference Championship is named in his honor

=== College ===
- NCAA National Champion: 1947
- Consensus first-team All-American: 1950
- Second-team All-American – AP, UPI, Look: 1949
- Third-team All-American – AP: 1948
- No. 17 retired by Holy Cross Crusaders
- Holy Cross Athletic Hall of Fame: 1956
- Holy Cross Basketball court named in his honor on February 7, 2026
- The Bob Cousy Award is given out by the Naismith Memorial Basketball Hall of Fame to the top men's collegiate point guard.

=== Other honors ===
- Basketball Legacy Award from The Sports Museum at TD Garden: 2005
- Honorary doctor of humane letters from Boston College: 2014
- Recipient of the Presidential Medal of Freedom on August 22, 2019
- Statue dedicated in his honor outside the DCU Center in Worcester, Massachusetts in June 2021
- Honorary doctor of humane letters from Worcester State University: 2023

== See also ==
- List of athletes who came out of retirement
- List of NBA career assists leaders
- List of NBA career triple-double leaders
- List of NBA career playoff assists leaders
- List of NBA single-game assists leaders
- List of NBA single-game playoff scoring leaders
