= NBA 25th Anniversary Team =

Basketball all-time team

The NBA 25th Anniversary Team was chosen on December 11, 1971, to honor the 25th anniversary of the founding of the National Basketball Association (NBA) as the Basketball Association of America (BAA) in 1946. It was the first anniversary team in the NBA. This team was meant to be an All-NBA Team for that period. Up until that time, All-NBA Teams only consisted of 2 teams (First and Second), so this Team also only consists of 2 teams/10 players (4 forwards, 2 centers, and 4 guards). The selections were restricted to retired players.

== Selections ==
List of 25th Anniversary Team players, sorted by position and vote received.

- F Bob Pettit
- F Dolph Schayes
- F Paul Arizin
- F Joe Fulks
- C Bill Russell
- C George Mikan
- G Bob Cousy
- G Bill Sharman
- G Bob Davies
- G Sam Jones
- Coach Red Auerbach

Russell was the only unanimous selection to the team. Furthermore, all nominees of the 25th Anniversary Team besides Feerick and Zaslofky have also been inducted into Naismith Memorial Basketball Hall of Fame.

In 1980, only four players of the 25th Anniversary Team were selected to the NBA 35th Anniversary Team (Pettit, Cousy, Russell, and Mikan). However, along with them, four other players of this team (Arizin, Jones, Schayes, Sharman) were selected as part of the NBA 50 Greatest Players of All-Time in 1996 and the NBA 75th Anniversary Team in 2021.

== Selection process ==
A panel selected 25 nominees from all eligible players, made up from 10 Forwards, 10 Guards, and 5 Centers. Then every NBA player that had been named All NBA 1st Team up to that time gave his vote. The four top voted forwards, two top voted centers, and four top voted guards made the team.

== Eligibility requirements ==
To be eligible as a nominee, a player must (by 1971):

1. have completed his career, and
2. have been named All-NBA Team at least once.

== Selection panels ==
Red Auerbach, Ned Irish, Eddie Gottlieb, Haskell Cohen, Danny Biasone, Lester Harrison, Fred Zollner, Ben Kerner, Fred Schaus, and Bob Feerick.

== Nominees ==
List of nominees, sorted by position, last name (players denoted with an asterisk had been inducted into the Basketball Hall Of Fame), and career years.

=== Forwards ===
- Paul Arizin*, 1950–1962
- Joe Fulks*, 1946–1954
- Harry Gallatin*, 1948–1958
- Tom Gola*, 1955–1966
- Vern Mikkelsen*, 1949–1959
- Bob Pettit*, 1954–1965
- Jim Pollard*, 1947–1955
- Tom Heinsohn*, 1956–1965
- Dolph Schayes*, 1948–1964
- George Yardley*, 1953–1960

=== Centers ===
- Neil Johnston*, 1951–1959
- Ed Macauley*, 1949–1959
- George Mikan*, 1946–1954, 1955–1956
- Bill Russell*, 1956–1969
- Maurice Stokes*, 1955–1958

=== Guards ===
- Richie Guerin*, 1956–1970
- Bob Cousy*, 1950–1963, 1969–1970
- Bob Davies*, 1946–1955
- Bob Feerick, 1945–1950
- Sam Jones*, 1957–1969
- Slater Martin*, 1949–1960
- Dick McGuire*, 1949–1960
- Bill Sharman*, 1950–1961
- Bobby Wanzer*, 1947–1957
- Max Zaslofsky, 1946–1956

== See also ==
- The W25, the 25th anniversary team of the NBA's sister league, the WNBA
