= NBA 75th Anniversary Team =

Top 76 NBA players in the history of the NBA

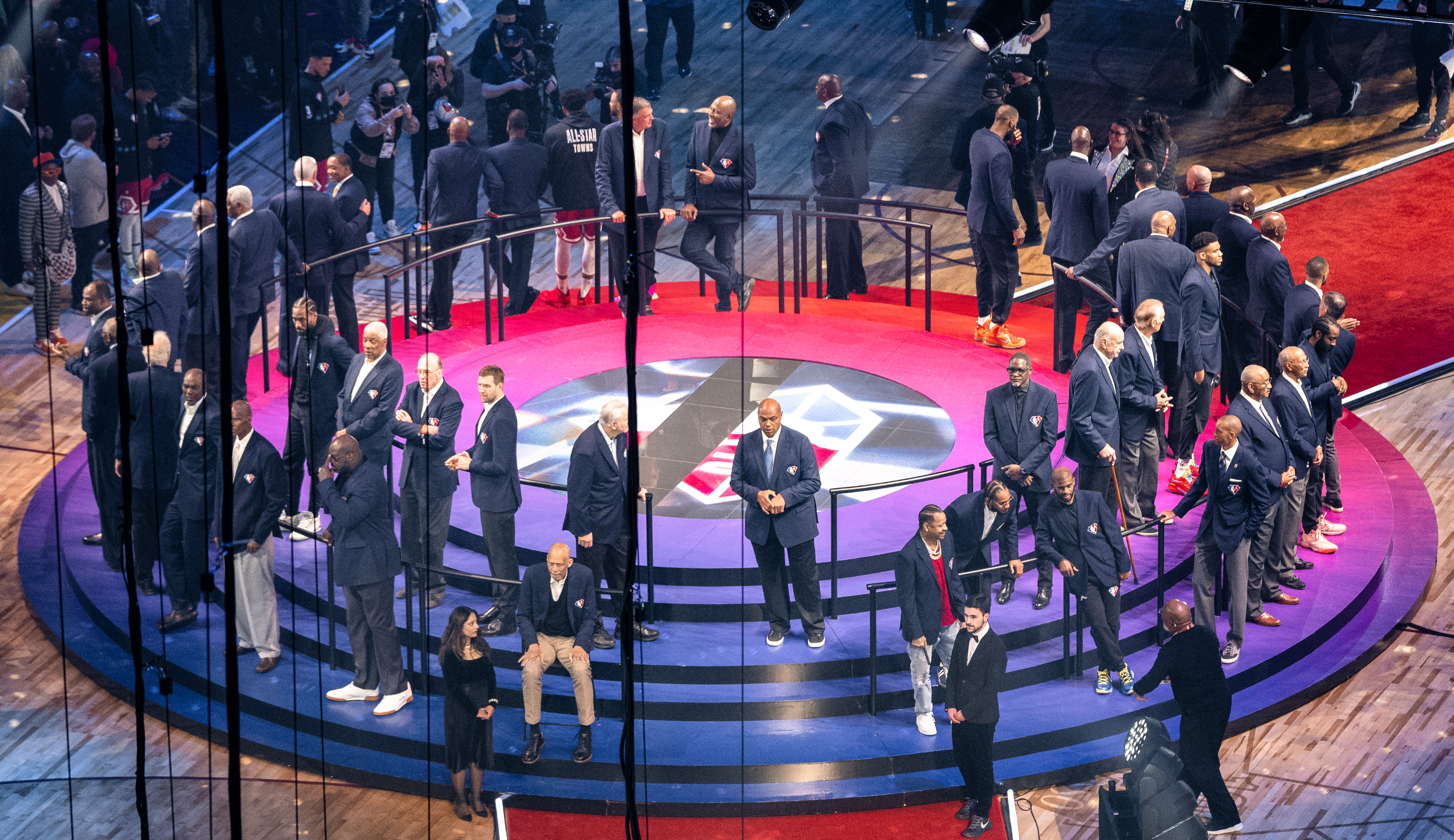
Members of the NBA 75th Anniversary Team during the halftime ceremony of the 2022 NBA All-Star Game.

The NBA 75th Anniversary Team, also referred to as the NBA 75, was chosen in 2021 to honor the 75th anniversary of the founding of the National Basketball Association (NBA). It was the fourth and most recent anniversary team in the league. Similar to the 50 Greatest Players in NBA History named in 1996, a panel of reporters, current and former players, coaches, general managers, and team executives selected the greatest players in league history. Tasked with compiling a list of 75 players, the committee named an additional 76th member due to a tie in voting. It was billed as part of the league's anniversary celebration during the 2021–22 NBA season. Forty-five of the seventy-six players were later assembled in Cleveland, during the halftime ceremony of the 2022 All-Star Game. (Note: The following players were honored posthumously: Paul Arizin (died 2006), Elgin Baylor (died 2021), Kobe Bryant (died 2020), Wilt Chamberlain (died 1999), Dave DeBusschere (died 2003), Hal Greer (died 2018), John Havlicek (died 2019), Sam Jones (died 2021), Moses Malone (died 2015), Pete Maravich (died 1988), George Mikan (died 2005), Dolph Schayes (died 2015), Bill Sharman (died 2013), Nate Thurmond (died 2016), and Wes Unseld (died 2020). The following players were honored virtually: Larry Bird, Bob Cousy, Dave Cowens, Tim Duncan, Walt Frazier, Karl Malone, Earl Monroe, Steve Nash, Scottie Pippen, Willis Reed, Bill Russell, Russell Westbrook, and Lenny Wilkens. Nate Archibald, Anthony Davis and Kevin Durant did not attend nor appear virtually in the ceremony for various reasons.)

== Players selected ==
=== List ===
At the time of selection, the players selected combined for 158 NBA championships, 62 Most Valuable Player (MVP) awards, 48 Finals MVP awards, and 730 All-Star selections. Of the 76 players, all 50 members of the 50th anniversary team were selected. The other 26 included players from the 1970s to the current era. Two notable omissions from the earlier top 50 selections, Bob McAdoo and Dominique Wilkins, were named to the 75th anniversary list. When the previous 50 players were chosen in 1996–97, Wilkins was the only nine-time All-Star to be excluded, as well as the only six-time All-NBA selection to miss the cut. A two-time NBA champion, McAdoo was the only former league MVP omitted. Bill Russell, Bob Cousy, George Mikan and Bob Pettit are the only players who have been named to all four NBA anniversary teams. (Note: The 25th anniversary team was the only one of the four teams that did not allow for the inclusion of active players at the time) Derrick Rose (2011) was the only former league MVP (as of 2020) not to be included on the team.

Eleven players (Giannis Antetokounmpo, Stephen Curry, Anthony Davis, Kevin Durant, James Harden, LeBron James, Kawhi Leonard, Damian Lillard, Carmelo Anthony, Chris Paul, and Russell Westbrook) were active in the 2021–22 season, when the list was announced. Four of them (Davis, James, Anthony, and Westbrook) were playing for the Los Angeles Lakers, on their 2022 squad, Despite that, the Lakers missed the playoffs. The Brooklyn Nets, with Durant and Harden on their 2021–22 roster, were the only other team with multiple active players. The Boston Celtics had the most overall players, past and present, on the list with 20. The Lakers were next with 15.

Key
Italics		Denotes player who was active in the NBA at the time of induction			
**Bold**		Denotes player who was not previously on the 50th Anniversary Team			
All-Star		Denotes number of All-Star appearances			
All-NBA		Denotes number of All-NBA selections			
HoF Year		Denotes year of Basketball Hall of Fame induction as player			
G	Guard	F	Forward	C	Center
Pos	Position	Pts	Points	Reb	Rebounds
Ast	Assists	MVP	Most Valuable Player		

Note: Statistics are correct through the end of the 2020–21 season, the season last completed before the list was announced.

(†) - Player deceased when selected for the team

NBA 75th Anniversary Team members
Name	Team(s) played for (years) (Note: American Basketball Association (ABA) teams other than those admitted into the NBA in 1976 are not included; each year is linked to an article about that particular NBA season.)	Pos	Pts	Reb	Ast	Championships won	MVP won	Finals MVP won	All Star	All-NBA	HoF Year	Ref.
Kareem Abdul-Jabbar	Milwaukee Bucks (1969–1975); Los Angeles Lakers (1975–1989)	C	38,387	17,440	5,660	6 (1971, 1980, 1982, 1985, 1987, 1988)	6 (1971, 1972, 1974, 1976, 1977, 1980)	2 (1971, 1985)	19	15	1995	
**Ray Allen**	Milwaukee Bucks (1996–2003); Seattle SuperSonics (2003–2007); Boston Celtics (2007–2012); Miami Heat (2012–2014)	G	24,505	5,272	4,361	2 (2008, 2013)	None	None	10	2	2018	
**Giannis Antetokounmpo**	Milwaukee Bucks (2013–2025–26, Miami Heat (2026)	F	12,319	5,371	2,632	1 (2021)	2 (2019, 2020)	1 (2021)	5	5	TBD	
**Carmelo Anthony**	Denver Nuggets (2003–2011); New York Knicks (2011–2017); Oklahoma City Thunder (2017–2018); Houston Rockets (2018–2019); Portland Trail Blazers (2019–2021)	F	27,370	7,520	3,354	None	None	None	10	6	2025 (Note: Anthony, Bryant, James, Kidd, Paul and Wade were members of the 2008 U.S. Olympic team that was inducted as a unit in 2025.)	
Nate Archibald	Cincinnati Royals / Kansas City-Omaha / Kansas City Kings (1970–1976); New York Nets (1976–1977); Boston Celtics (1978–1983); Milwaukee Bucks (1983–1984)	G	16,481	2,046	6,476	1 (1981)	None	None	6	5	1991	
Paul Arizin †	Philadelphia Warriors (1950–1952, 1954–1962)	F	16,266	6,129	1,665	1 (1956)	None	None	10	4	1978	
Charles Barkley	Philadelphia 76ers (1984–1992); Phoenix Suns (1992–1996); Houston Rockets (1996–2000)	F	23,757	12,546	4,215	None	1 (1993)	None	11	11	2006 (Note: Barkley, Bird, Drexler, Ewing, Johnson, Jordan, Karl Malone, Pippen, Robinson, and Stockton were members of the 1992 U.S. Olympic team that was inducted as a unit in 2010.)	
Rick Barry	San Francisco / Golden State Warriors (1965–1967, 1972–1978); Houston Rockets (1978–1980)	F	18,395	5,168	4,017	1 (1975)	None	1 (1975)	8	6	1987	
Elgin Baylor †	Minneapolis / Los Angeles Lakers (1958–1971)	F	23,149	11,463	3,650	None	None	None	11	10	1977	
Dave Bing	Detroit Pistons (1966–1975); Washington Bullets (1975–1977); Boston Celtics (1977–1978)	G	18,327	3,420	5,397	None	None	None	7	3	1990	
Larry Bird	Boston Celtics (1979–1992)	F	21,791	8,974	5,695	3 (1981, 1984, 1986)	3 (1984, 1985, 1986)	2 (1984, 1986)	12	10	1998	
**Kobe Bryant** †	Los Angeles Lakers (1996–2016)	G	33,643	7,047	6,306	5 (2000, 2001, 2002, 2009, 2010)	1 (2008)	2 (2009, 2010)	18	15	2020	
Wilt Chamberlain †	Philadelphia / San Francisco Warriors (1959–1965); Philadelphia 76ers (1965–1968); Los Angeles Lakers (1968–1973)	C	31,419	23,924	4,643	2 (1967, 1972)	4 (1960, 1966, 1967, 1968)	1 (1972)	13	10	1979	
Bob Cousy	Boston Celtics (1950–1963); Cincinnati Royals (1969–1970)	G	16,960	4,786	6,955	6 (1957, 1959, 1960, 1961, 1962, 1963)	1 (1957)	None	13	12	1971	
Dave Cowens	Boston Celtics (1970–1980); Milwaukee Bucks (1982–1983)	C	13,516	10,444	2,910	2 (1974, 1976)	1 (1973)	None	7	3	1991	
Billy Cunningham	Philadelphia 76ers (1965–1972, 1974–1976)	F	13,626	6,638	2,625	1 (1967)	None	None	5	4	1986	
**Stephen Curry**	Golden State Warriors (2009–2024)	G	23,668	4,509	6,119	4 (2015, 2017, 2018, 2022)	2 (2015, 2016)	1 (2022)	10	10	TBD	
**Anthony Davis**	New Orleans Hornets / Pelicans (2012–2019); Los Angeles Lakers (2019–2021)	F/C	16,988	7,420	1,732	1 (2020)	None	None	9	4	TBD	
Dave DeBusschere †	Detroit Pistons (1962–1968); New York Knicks (1968–1974)	F	14,053	9,618	2,497	2 (1970, 1973)	None	None	8	1	1983	
Clyde Drexler	Portland Trail Blazers (1983–1995); Houston Rockets (1995–1998)	G	22,195	6,677	6,125	1 (1995)	None	None	10	5	2004	
**Tim Duncan**	San Antonio Spurs (1997–2016)	F/C	26,496	15,091	4,225	5 (1999, 2003, 2005, 2007, 2014)	2 (2002, 2003)	3 (1999, 2003, 2005)	15	15	2020	
**Kevin Durant**	Seattle SuperSonics / Oklahoma City Thunder (2007–2016); Golden State Warriors (2016–2019); Brooklyn Nets (2019–2023); Phoenix Suns (2023–2025)Houston (2025–2026)	F	28,924	7,454	4,645	2 (2017, 2018)	1 (2014)	2 (2017, 2018)	14	11	TBD	
Julius Erving	Philadelphia 76ers (1976–1987)	F	18,364	5,601	3,224	1 (1983)	1 (1981)	None	11	7	1993	
Patrick Ewing	New York Knicks (1985–2000); Seattle SuperSonics (2000–2001); Orlando Magic (2001–2002)	C	24,815	11,607	2,215	None	None	None	11	7	2008	
Walt Frazier	New York Knicks (1967–1977); Cleveland Cavaliers (1977–1979)	G	15,581	4,830	5,040	2 (1970, 1973)	None	None	7	6	1987	
**Kevin Garnett**	Minnesota Timberwolves (1995–2007, 2015–2016); Boston Celtics (2007–2013); Brooklyn Nets (2013–2015)	F/C	26,071	14,662	5,445	1 (2008)	1 (2004)	None	15	9	2020	
George Gervin	San Antonio Spurs (1976–1985); Chicago Bulls (1985–1986)	G	20,708	3,607	2,214	None	None	None	9	7	1996	
Hal Greer †	Syracuse Nationals / Philadelphia 76ers (1958–1973)	G	21,586	5,665	4,540	1 (1967)	None	None	10	7	1982	
**James Harden**	Oklahoma City Thunder (2009–2012); Houston Rockets (2012–2021); Brooklyn Nets (2021)Los Angeles (2023)	G	22,045	4,794	5,730	None	1 (2018)	None	9	7	TBD	
John Havlicek †	Boston Celtics (1962–1978)	F/G	26,395	8,007	6,114	8 (1963, 1964, 1965, 1966, 1968, 1969, 1974, 1976)	None	1 (1974)	13	11	1984	
Elvin Hayes	San Diego / Houston Rockets (1968–1972, 1981–1984); Baltimore / Capital / Washington Bullets (1972–1981)	F/C	27,313	16,279	2,398	1 (1978)	None	None	12	6	1990	
**Allen Iverson**	Philadelphia 76ers (1996–2006, 2009–2010); Denver Nuggets (2006–2008); Detroit Pistons (2008–2009); Memphis Grizzlies (2009)	G	24,368	3,394	5,624	None	1 (2001)	None	11	7	2016	
**LeBron James**	Cleveland Cavaliers (2003–2010, 2014–2018); Miami Heat (2010–2014); Los Angeles Lakers (2018–2026); Philadelphia 76ers (2026)	F	40,017	10,847	11,046	4 (2012, 2013, 2016, 2020)	4 (2009, 2010, 2012, 2013)	4 (2012, 2013, 2016, 2020)	21	20	TBD	
Magic Johnson	Los Angeles Lakers (1979–1991, 1996)	G	17,707	6,559	10,141	5 (1980, 1982, 1985, 1987, 1988)	3 (1987, 1989, 1990)	3 (1980, 1982, 1987)	12	10	2002	
Sam Jones	Boston Celtics (1957–1969)	G	15,411	4,305	2,209	10 (1959, 1960, 1961, 1962, 1963, 1964, 1965, 1966, 1968, 1969)	None	None	5	3	1984	
Michael Jordan	Chicago Bulls (1984–1993, 1995–1998); Washington Wizards (2001–2003)	G	32,292	6,672	5,633	6 (1991, 1992, 1993, 1996, 1997, 1998)	5 (1988, 1991, 1992, 1996, 1998)	6 (1991, 1992, 1993, 1996, 1997, 1998)	14	11	2009	
**Jason Kidd**	Dallas Mavericks (1994–1996, 2008–2012); Phoenix Suns (1996–2001); New Jersey Nets (2001–2008); New York Knicks (2012–2013)	G	17,529	8,725	12,091	1 (2011)	None	None	10	6	2018	
**Kawhi Leonard**	San Antonio Spurs (2011–2018); Toronto Raptors (2018–2019); Los Angeles Clippers (2019–2021)	F	11,085	3,689	1,672	2 (2014, 2019)	None	2 (2014, 2019)	5	5	TBD	
**Damian Lillard**	Portland Trail Blazers (2012–2021)	G	16,815	2,856	4,514	None	None	None	6	6	TBD	
Jerry Lucas	Cincinnati Royals (1963–1969); San Francisco Warriors (1969–1971); New York Knicks (1971–1974)	F	14,053	12,942	2,732	1 (1973)	None	None	7	5	1980 (Note: Lucas, Robertson, and West were members of the 1960 U.S. Olympic basketball team that was inducted as a unit in 2010.)	
Karl Malone	Utah Jazz (1985–2003); Los Angeles Lakers (2003–2004)	F	36,928	14,968	5,248	None	2 (1997, 1999)	None	14	14	2010	
Moses Malone †	Buffalo Braves (1976); Houston Rockets (1976–1982); Philadelphia 76ers (1982–1986, 1993–1994); Washington Bullets (1986–1988); Atlanta Hawks (1988–1991); Milwaukee Bucks (1991–1993); San Antonio Spurs (1994–1995)	C	27,409	16,212	1,796	1 (1983)	3 (1979, 1982, 1983)	1 (1983)	12	8	2001	
Pete Maravich †	Atlanta Hawks (1970–1974); New Orleans / Utah Jazz (1974–1980); Boston Celtics (1980)	G	15,948	2,747	3,563	None	None	None	5	4	1987	
**Bob McAdoo**	Buffalo Braves (1972–1976); New York Knicks (1976–1979); Boston Celtics (1979); Detroit Pistons (1979–1981); New Jersey Nets (1981); Los Angeles Lakers (1981–1985); Philadelphia 76ers (1986)	F/C	18,787	8,048	1,951	2 (1982, 1985)	1 (1975)	None	5	2	2000	
Kevin McHale	Boston Celtics (1980–1993)	F	17,335	7,122	1,670	3 (1981, 1984, 1986)	None	None	7	1	1999	
George Mikan †	Minneapolis Lakers (1948–1954, 1956)	C	10,156	4,167	1,245	5 (1949, 1950, 1952, 1953, 1954)	None	None	4	6	1959	
**Reggie Miller**	Indiana Pacers (1987–2005)	G	25,279	4,182	4,141	None	None	None	5	3	2012	
Earl Monroe	Baltimore Bullets (1967–1971); New York Knicks (1971–1980)	G	17,454	2,796	3,594	1 (1973)	None	None	4	1	1990	
**Steve Nash**	Phoenix Suns (1996–1998, 2004–2012); Dallas Mavericks (1998–2004); Los Angeles Lakers (2012–2015)	G	17,387	3,642	10,335	None	2 (2005, 2006)	None	8	7	2018	
**Dirk Nowitzki**	Dallas Mavericks (1998–2019)	F	31,560	11,489	3,651	1 (2011)	1 (2007)	1 (2011)	14	12	2023	
Hakeem Olajuwon	Houston Rockets (1984–2001); Toronto Raptors (2001–2002)	C	26,946	13,748	3,058	2 (1994, 1995)	1 (1994)	2 (1994, 1995)	12	12	2008	
Shaquille O'Neal	Orlando Magic (1992–1996); Los Angeles Lakers (1996–2004); Miami Heat (2004–2008); Phoenix Suns (2008–2009); Cleveland Cavaliers (2009–2010); Boston Celtics (2010–2011)	C	28,596	13,099	3,026	4 (2000, 2001, 2002, 2006)	1 (2000)	3 (2000, 2001, 2002)	15	14	2016	
Robert Parish	Golden State Warriors (1976–1980); Boston Celtics (1980–1994); Charlotte Hornets (1994–1996); Chicago Bulls (1996–1997)	C	23,334	14,715	2,180	4 (1981, 1984, 1986, 1997)	None	None	9	2	2003	
**Chris Paul**	New Orleans Hornets (2005–2011); Los Angeles Clippers (2011–2017); Houston Rockets (2017–2019); Oklahoma City Thunder (2019–2020); Phoenix Suns (2020–2021)	G	19,978	4,923	10,275	None	None	None	11	10	TBD	
**Gary Payton**	Seattle SuperSonics (1990–2003); Milwaukee Bucks (2003); Los Angeles Lakers (2003–2004); Boston Celtics (2004–2005); Miami Heat (2005–2007)	G	21,813	5,269	8,966	1 (2006)	None	None	9	9	2013	
Bob Pettit	Milwaukee / St. Louis Hawks (1954–1965)	F	20,880	12,849	2,369	1 (1958)	2 (1956, 1959)	None	11	11	1971	
**Paul Pierce**	Boston Celtics (1998–2013); Brooklyn Nets (2013–2014); Washington Wizards (2014–2015); Los Angeles Clippers (2015–2017)	F	26,397	7,527	4,708	1 (2008)	None	1 (2008)	10	4	2021	
Scottie Pippen	Chicago Bulls (1987–1998, 2003–2004); Houston Rockets (1999); Portland Trail Blazers (1999–2003)	F	18,940	7,494	6,135	6 (1991, 1992, 1993, 1996, 1997, 1998)	None	None	7	7	2010	
Willis Reed	New York Knicks (1964–1974)	C/F	12,183	8,414	1,186	2 (1970, 1973)	1 (1970)	2 (1970, 1973)	7	5	1982	
Oscar Robertson	Cincinnati Royals (1960–1970); Milwaukee Bucks (1970–1974)	G	26,710	7,804	9,887	1 (1971)	1 (1964)	None	12	11	1980	
David Robinson	San Antonio Spurs (1989–2003)	C	20,790	10,497	2,441	2 (1999, 2003)	1 (1995)	None	10	10	2009	
**Dennis Rodman**	Detroit Pistons (1986–1993); San Antonio Spurs (1993–1995); Chicago Bulls (1995–1998); Los Angeles Lakers (1999); Dallas Mavericks (2000)	F	6,683	11,954	1,600	5 (1989, 1990, 1996, 1997, 1998)	None	None	2	2	2011	
Bill Russell	Boston Celtics (1956–1969)	C	14,522	21,620	4,100	11 (1957, 1959, 1960, 1961, 1962, 1963, 1964, 1965, 1966, 1968, 1969)	5 (1958, 1961, 1962, 1963, 1965)	None	12	11	1975 (Note: Russell was inducted as a coach in 2021.)	
Dolph Schayes †	Syracuse Nationals / Philadelphia 76ers (1949–1964)	F	18,438	11,256	3,072	1 (1955)	None	None	12	12	1973	
Bill Sharman †	Washington Capitols (1950–1951); Boston Celtics (1951–1961)	G	12,665	2,779	2,101	4 (1957, 1959, 1960, 1961)	None	None	8	7	1976	
John Stockton	Utah Jazz (1984–2003)	G	19,711	4,051	15,806	None	None	None	10	11	2009	
Isiah Thomas	Detroit Pistons (1981–1994)	G	18,822	3,478	9,061	2 (1989, 1990)	None	1 (1990)	12	5	2000	
Nate Thurmond †	San Francisco / Golden State Warriors (1963–1974); Chicago Bulls (1974–1975); Cleveland Cavaliers (1975–1977)	C	14,437	14,464	2,575	None	None	None	7	0	1985	
Wes Unseld †	Baltimore / Capital / Washington Bullets (1968–1981)	C	10,624	13,769	3,822	1 (1978)	1 (1969)	1 (1978)	5	1	1988	
**Dwyane Wade**	Miami Heat (2003–2016, 2018–2019); Chicago Bulls (2016–2017); Cleveland Cavaliers (2017–2018)	G	23,165	4,933	5,701	3 (2006, 2012, 2013)	None	1 (2006)	13	8	2023	
Bill Walton	Portland Trail Blazers (1974–1979); San Diego / Los Angeles Clippers (1979–1985); Boston Celtics (1985–1988)	C	6,215	4,923	1,590	2 (1977, 1986)	1 (1978)	1 (1977)	2	2	1993	
Jerry West	Los Angeles Lakers (1960–1974)	G	25,192	5,366	6,238	1 (1972)	None	1 (1969)	14	12	1980 (Note: West was inducted as a contributor in 2024.)	
**Russell Westbrook**	Oklahoma City Thunder (2008–2019); Houston Rockets (2019–2020); Washington Wizards (2020–2021)	G	26,473	6,961	8,061	None	1 (2017)	None	9	9	TBD	
Lenny Wilkens	St. Louis Hawks (1960−1968); Seattle SuperSonics (1968–1972); Cleveland Cavaliers (1972–1974); Portland Trail Blazers (1974–1975)	G	17,772	5,030	7,211	None	None	None	9	0	1989	
**Dominique Wilkins**	Atlanta Hawks (1982–1994); Los Angeles Clippers (1994); Boston Celtics (1994–1995); San Antonio Spurs (1996–1997); Orlando Magic (1999)	F	26,668	7,169	2,677	None	None	None	9	7	2006	
James Worthy	Los Angeles Lakers (1982–1994)	F	16,320	4,708	2,791	3 (1985, 1987, 1988)	None	1 (1988)	7	2	2003	

=== Selection process ===
The list was made through voting compiled by a panel of 88 media, current and former players, coaches, general managers, and team executives. The NBA stated the players were "selected for being pioneers that have helped shape, define, and redefine the game." The NBA revealed 25 members of the list the first two days, and 26 the last day from October 19 through October 21, 2021.

=== Criticisms ===
Former NBA coach and television commentator Stan Van Gundy said that it was "absolutely ridiculous" that Dwight Howard was not included on the team. Howard later said, "I knew I wasn't going to be on it". On an Instagram post, Klay Thompson said, "Maybe I’m just naive in my ability to play basketball, but in my head, I’m top 75 all-time." NBA coach and former commentator Steve Kerr said that he had hoped Thompson and Draymond Green "would be on there".

Other notable NBA Hall of Famers and All-Stars such as Vince Carter, Tracy McGrady, Kyrie Irving and Yao Ming who helped redefine or popularize the sport of basketball were also not selected.

== 15 Greatest Coaches in NBA History ==
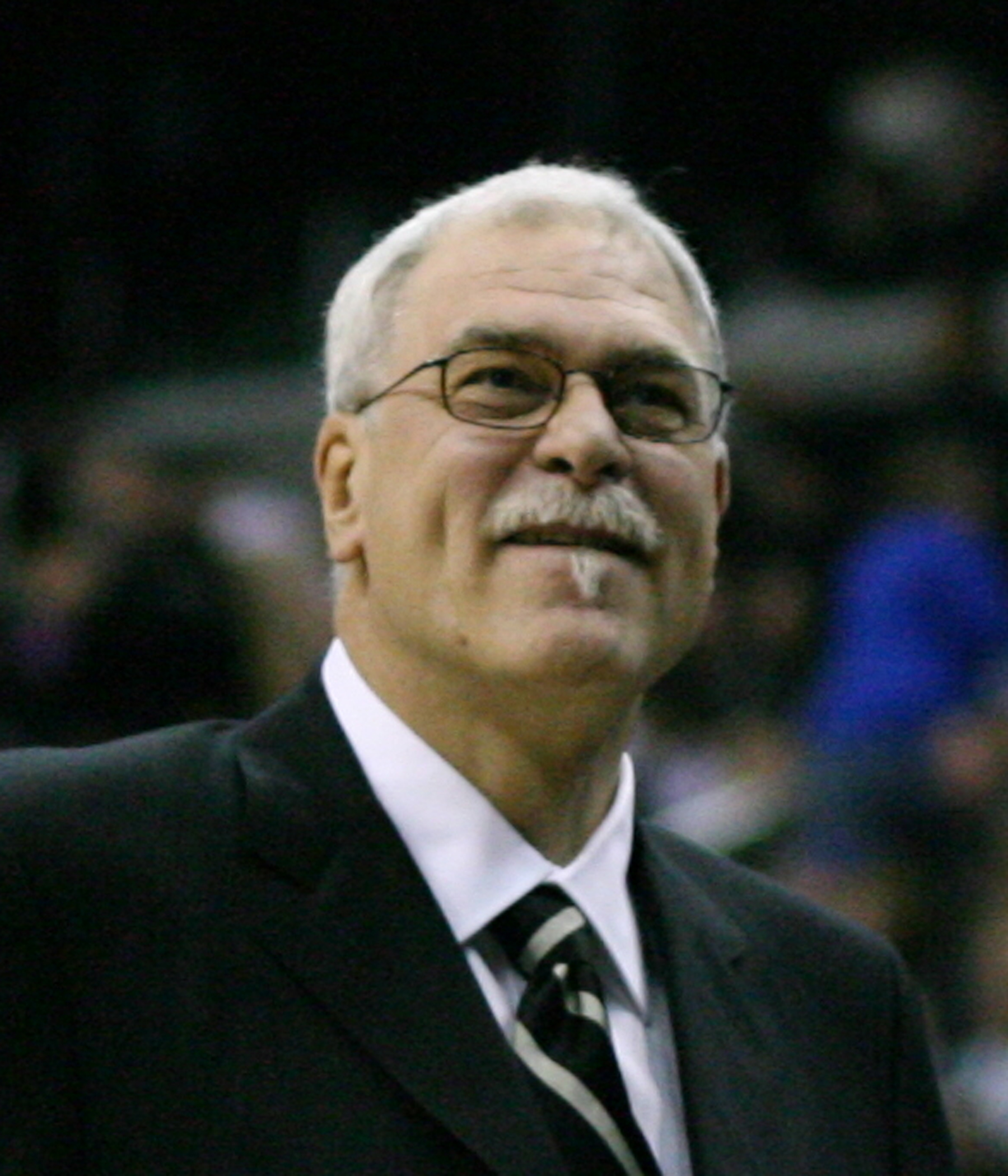
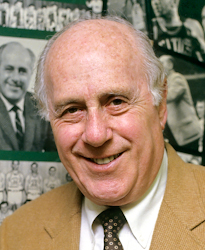
Phil Jackson (left) and Red Auerbach (right) both made the 2022 list of the 15 greatest coaches in NBA history.

Alongside the selection of the NBA's 75th anniversary team was the selection of the 15 Greatest Coaches in NBA History. The list was compiled based upon unranked selection undertaken exclusively by a panel of 43 current and former NBA coaches in collaboration with the National Basketball Coaches Association. Of the 15 coaches, eight members of the Top 10 Coaches in NBA History in 1996 were selected; original Top 10 coaches Bill Fitch and John Kundla were excluded from the updated list. Nine of the 15 coaches named were alive at the time of the list's announcement, and four of them—Steve Kerr, Gregg Popovich, Doc Rivers, and Erik Spoelstra—were active. (Note: Italicized record and winning percentage reflect all games played through the 2021–22 season; the preceding record is that of the coach at the time of his selection.) Since then, Popovich and Rivers retired in 2025 and 2026 respectively and Lenny Wilkens died in 2025. The other deceased coaches are Red Holzman in 1998, Red Auerbach in 2006, Chuck Daly in 2009, Jack Ramsay in 2014, and both K. C. Jones and Jerry Sloan in 2020. Sloan and Don Nelson were the only members to never win a championship as a coach; Nelson won five as a player. Wilkens is the only person named to both the coaches and players lists, doing so for both the 50th and 75th anniversary lists. At the time of selection, 10 of the 15 coaches were members of the Naismith Memorial Basketball Hall of Fame as a coach. Nelson was the most recent inductee at the time, inducted in 2012. Popovich and Rivers would later be inducted in 2023 and 2026 respectively. Jones is the only inactive coach to not be inducted.

Key
Italics	Denotes coach who was active in the NBA at the time of induction
**Bold**	Denotes coach who was not previously selected among the Top 10 Coaches in NBA History

Note: Statistics are correct through the end of the 2020–21 season, the season last completed before the list was announced.

Coach	Team(s) coached (years)	Coaching record	Championships won as coach	Coach of the Year award(s) won	Year of Basketball Hall of Fame induction as coach	Ref.
Red Auerbach	Washington Capitols (1946–1949); Tri-Cities Blackhawks (1949–1950); Boston Celtics (1950–1966)	938–479 (.662)	9 (1957, 1959, 1960, 1961, 1962, 1963, 1964, 1965, 1966)	1 (1965)	1969	
**Larry Brown**	Denver Nuggets (1976–1979); New Jersey Nets (1981–1983); San Antonio Spurs (1988–1992); Los Angeles Clippers (1992–1993); Indiana Pacers (1993–1997); Philadelphia 76ers (1997–2003); Detroit Pistons (2003–2005); New York Knicks (2005–2006); Charlotte Bobcats (2008–2010)	1,098–904 (.548)	1 (2004)	1 (2001)	2002	
Chuck Daly	Cleveland Cavaliers (1982); Detroit Pistons (1983–1992); New Jersey Nets (1992–1994); Orlando Magic (1997–1999)	638–437 (.593)	2 (1989, 1990)	None	1994	
Red Holzman	Milwaukee / St. Louis Hawks (1954–1956); New York Knicks (1967–1977), (1978–1982)	696–604 (.535)	2 (1970, 1973)	1 (1970)	1986	
Phil Jackson	Chicago Bulls (1989–1998); Los Angeles Lakers (1999–2004, 2005–2011)	1,155–485 (.704)	11 (1991, 1992, 1993, 1996, 1997, 1998, 2000, 2001, 2002, 2009, 2010)	1 (1996)	2007	
**K. C. Jones**	Capital / Washington Bullets (1973–1976); Boston Celtics (1983–1988); Seattle SuperSonics (1990–1992)	522–252 (.674)	2 (1984, 1986)	None	– (Note: Jones was inducted to the Hall as a player in 1989.)	
**Steve Kerr**	Golden State Warriors (2014–2025)	376–171 (.687)	4 (2015, 2017, 2018, 2022)	1 (2016)	–	
Don Nelson	Milwaukee Bucks (1976–1987); Golden State Warriors (1988–1995, 2006–2010); New York Knicks (1995–1996); Dallas Mavericks (1997–2005)	1,335–1,063 (.557)	None	3 (1983, 1985, 1992)	2012	
**Gregg Popovich**	San Antonio Spurs (1996–2025)	1,310–653 (.667)	5 (1999, 2003, 2005, 2007, 2014)	3 (2003, 2012, 2014)	2023	
Jack Ramsay	Philadelphia 76ers (1968–1972); Buffalo Braves (1972–1976); Portland Trail Blazers (1976–1986); Indiana Pacers (1986–1988)	864–783 (.525)	1 (1977)	None	1992	
Pat Riley	Los Angeles Lakers (1981–1990); New York Knicks (1991–1995); Miami Heat (1995–2003, 2005–2008)	1,210–694 (.636)	5 (1982, 1985, 1987, 1988, 2006)	3 (1990, 1993, 1997)	2008	
**Doc Rivers**	Orlando Magic (1999–2003); Boston Celtics (2004–2013); Los Angeles Clippers (2013–2020); Philadelphia 76ers (2020–2023); Milwaukee Bucks (2023–2025)	992–704 (.585)	1 (2008)	1 (2000)	2026	
**Jerry Sloan**	Chicago Bulls (1979–1982); Utah Jazz (1988–2011)	1,221–803 (.603)	None	None	2009	
**Erik Spoelstra**	Miami Heat (2008–2025)	607–424 (.589)	2 (2012, 2013)	None	–	
Lenny Wilkens	Seattle SuperSonics (1969–1972, 1977–1985); Portland Trail Blazers (1974–1976); Cleveland Cavaliers (1986–1993); Atlanta Hawks (1993–2000); Toronto Raptors (2000–2003); New York Knicks (2004–2005)	1,332–1,155 (.536)	1 (1979)	1 (1994)	1998	

== See also ==
- ABA All-Time Team
- NBA 25th Anniversary Team
- NBA 35th Anniversary Team
- 50 Greatest Players in NBA History
