= Bob Pettit =

American basketball player and coach (1932–2026)

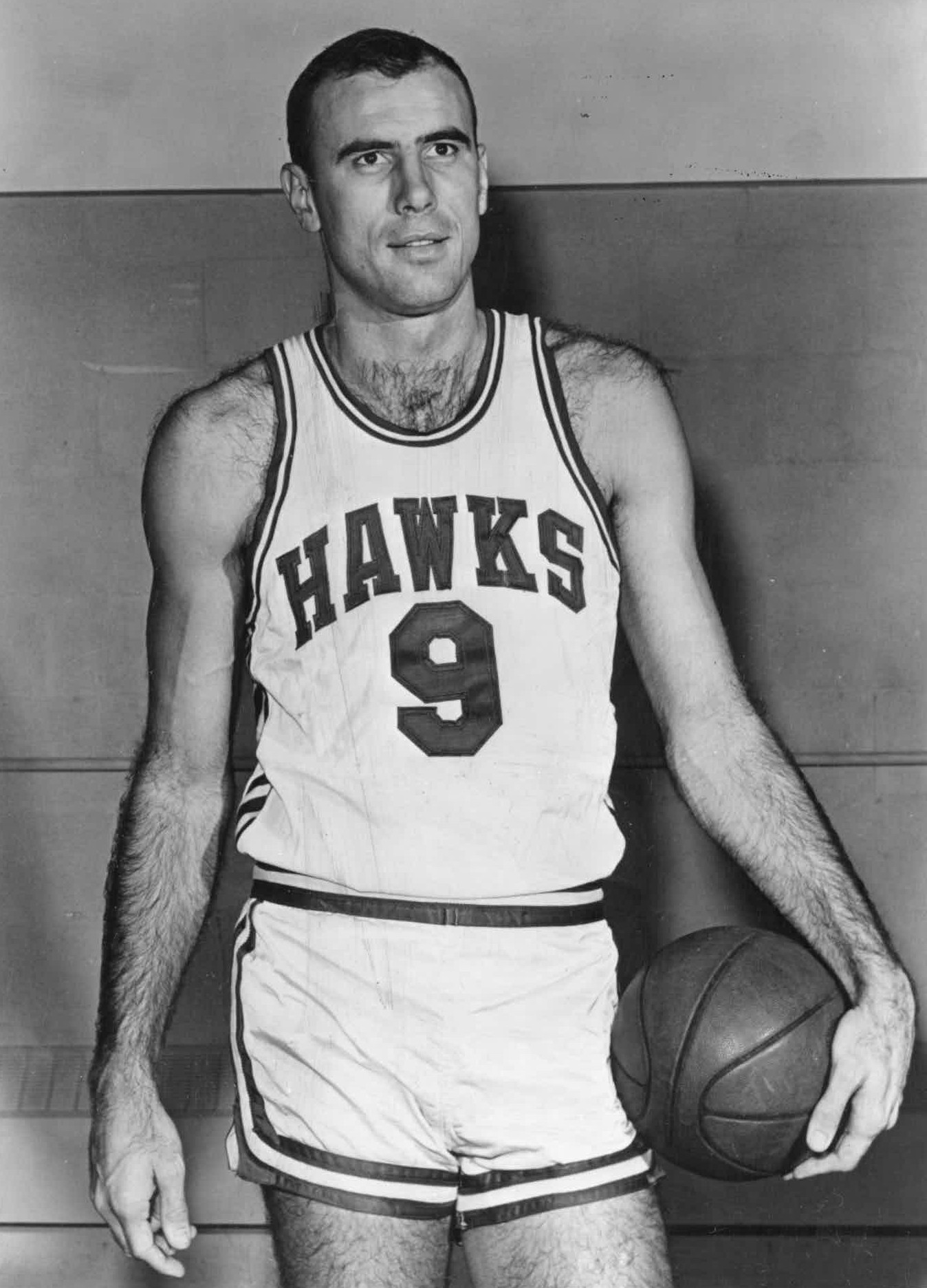
- Pettit with the St. Louis Hawks in 1961

Personal information
- Born: December 12, 1932 Baton Rouge, Louisiana, U.S.
- Died: September 23, 2026 (aged 93) New Orleans, Louisiana, U.S.
- Listed height: 6 ft 9 in (2.06 m)
- Listed weight: 205 lb (93 kg)

Career information
- High school: Baton Rouge (Baton Rouge, Louisiana)
- College: LSU (1951–1954)
- NBA draft: 1954: 1st round, 2nd overall pick
- Drafted by: Milwaukee Hawks
- Playing career: 1954–1965
- Position: Power forward
- Number: 9

Career history
- 1954–1965: Milwaukee / St. Louis Hawks

Career highlights
- NBA champion (1958); 2× NBA Most Valuable Player (1956, 1959); 11× NBA All-Star (1955–1965); 4× NBA All-Star Game MVP (1956, 1958, 1959 (Note: co-MVP along with Elgin Baylor), 1962); 10× All-NBA First Team (1955–1964); All-NBA Second Team (1965); NBA Rookie of the Year (1955); 2× NBA scoring champion (1956, 1959); NBA rebounding leader (1956); NBA anniversary team (25th, 35th, 50th, 75th); No. 9 retired by Atlanta Hawks; Consensus first-team All-American (1954); Consensus second-team All-American (1953); No. 50 retired by LSU Tigers

Career NBA statistics
- Points: 20,880 (26.4 ppg)
- Rebounds: 12,849 (16.2 rpg)
- Assists: 2,369 (3.0 apg)
- Stats at NBA.com
- Stats at Basketball Reference
- Basketball Hall of Fame
- Collegiate Basketball Hall of Fame

Robert Lee Pettit Jr. (/ˈpɛtɪt/ PET-it; December 12, 1932 – September 23, 2026) was an American professional basketball player. He played 11 seasons in the National Basketball Association (NBA), all with the Milwaukee / St. Louis Hawks (1954–1965). In 1956, he became the first recipient of the NBA's Most Valuable Player Award and he won the award again in 1959. He also won the NBA All-Star Game MVP award four times. As of the end of the 2025–2026 regular season, Pettit is still the only regular season MVP in the history of the Hawks. Pettit is the Hawks' franchise leader for most career rebounds (12,849), and most rebounds per game with 16.2.

The first NBA player to score more than 20,000 points, Pettit was inducted into the Naismith Memorial Basketball Hall of Fame in 1970. He is one of four players who was named to all four NBA anniversary teams. He is widely regarded as one of the greatest power forwards of all time.

== Early life ==
Robert Lee Pettit Jr. was born in Baton Rouge, Louisiana, on December 12, 1932. His father, who served as sheriff of East Baton Rouge Parish from 1932 to 1936, was from Denver and played basketball at Westminster College. His mother was from Mississippi. Pettit's basketball career had humble beginnings, as at Baton Rouge High School, he was cut from the varsity basketball team as both a freshman and sophomore. He played church league basketball as a sophomore and grew five inches in less than a year. Because the Pettit home did not have a basketball hoop, Pettit's father pushed him to practice in the backyard of their next door neighbors, the Kemmerlys, until he improved his skills. It worked: Pettit became a starter and made the All-City prep team as a junior. As a 6-7 senior, he led Baton Rouge High to its first state championship in over 20 years. Pettit was then selected to play in a North–South all-star game at Murray, Kentucky.

== College career ==
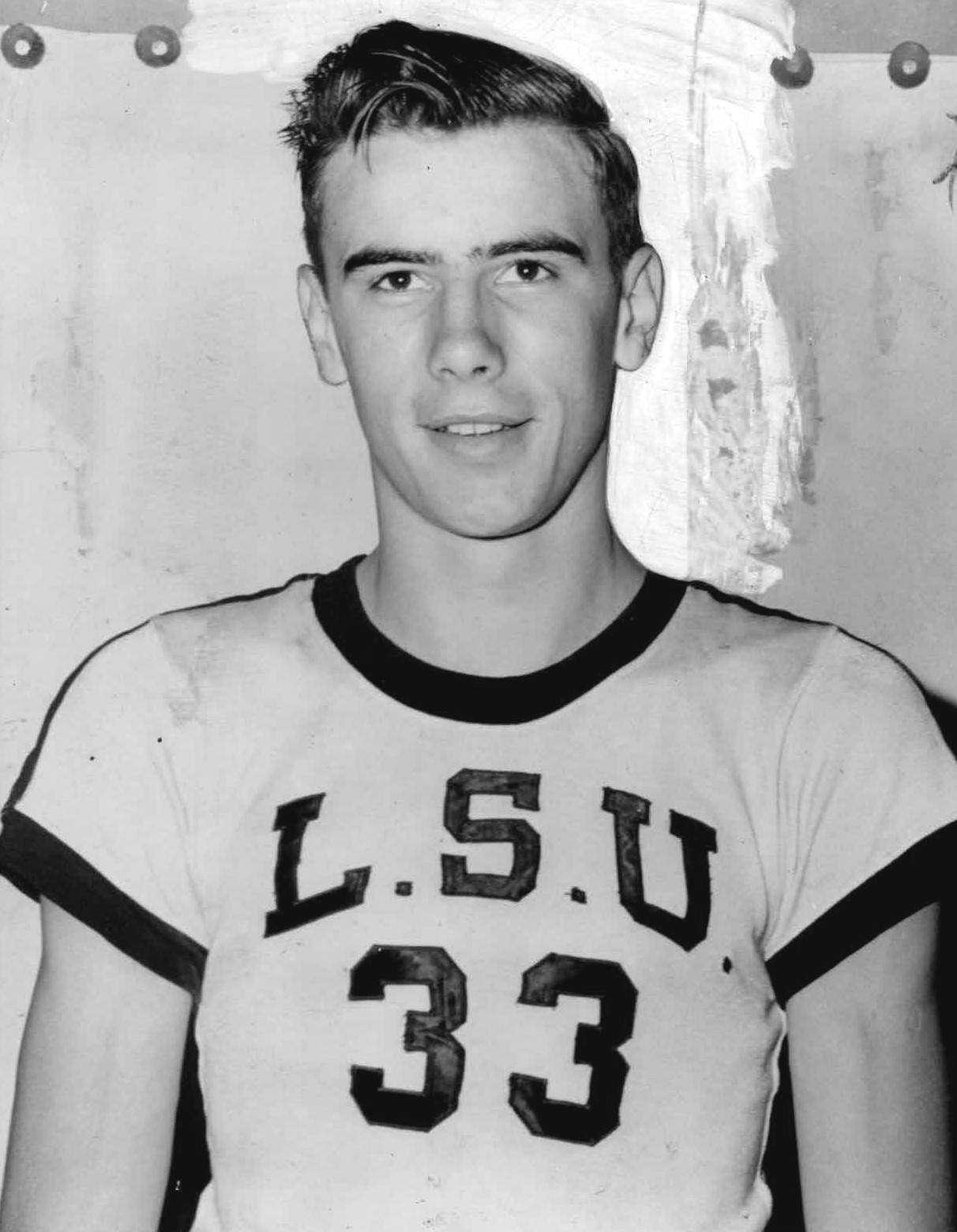
Pettit in 1951

After high school, Pettit had scholarship offers from 14 universities and accepted a scholarship to play at nearby Louisiana State University (LSU). He was a three-time All-Southeastern Conference selection and a two-time All-American as a member of the LSU men's basketball team. (Freshmen were not allowed to play varsity basketball at the time.) During those three years, Pettit averaged 27.8 points per game. He was also a member of the Zeta Zeta chapter of Delta Kappa Epsilon at LSU.

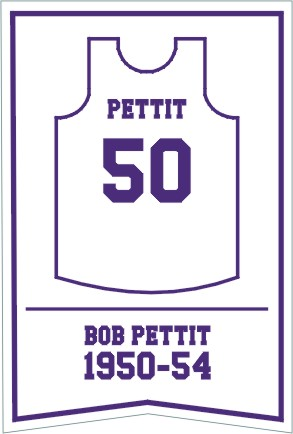
Pettit's #50 was retired by Louisiana State University in 1954

Pettit made his varsity debut at LSU in 1952. He led the SEC in scoring for his first of three consecutive seasons, averaging 25.5 points per game. He ranked third in the nation in scoring and also averaged 13.1 rebounds per game, helping his team to a 17–7 win–loss record for a second-place finish in the league, and was selected to the All-SEC team.

During his junior year, Pettit helped the Tigers sail through a 23-game regular-season schedule with only one loss (to Tulsa). A clean sweep of SEC opponents became LSU's second SEC Title (their first came in 1935) and the school's first NCAA Final Four. He averaged 24.9 points and 13.9 rebounds per game for the 1953 season. He was honored with selections to both the All-SEC and All-American teams.

Pettit averaged 31.4 points and 17.3 rebounds per game during his senior year and once again led LSU to an SEC Championship and garnered All-SEC and All-American honors. He set a then-SEC scoring record of 60 points against Louisiana College in his second game, and also the SEC record for scoring average, with both records later being broken by Pete Maravich. Pettit also was the second player in major-college basketball history to average more than 30 points a game.

In 1954, his number 50 was retired at LSU. He was the first Tiger athlete in any sport to receive this distinction. In 1999, he was named Living Legend for LSU at the SEC Basketball Tournament. He is a member of the LSU Hall of Fame. Bob Pettit Boulevard in Baton Rouge, Louisiana is named after him.

== Professional career ==
=== Milwaukee / St. Louis Hawks (1954–1965) ===
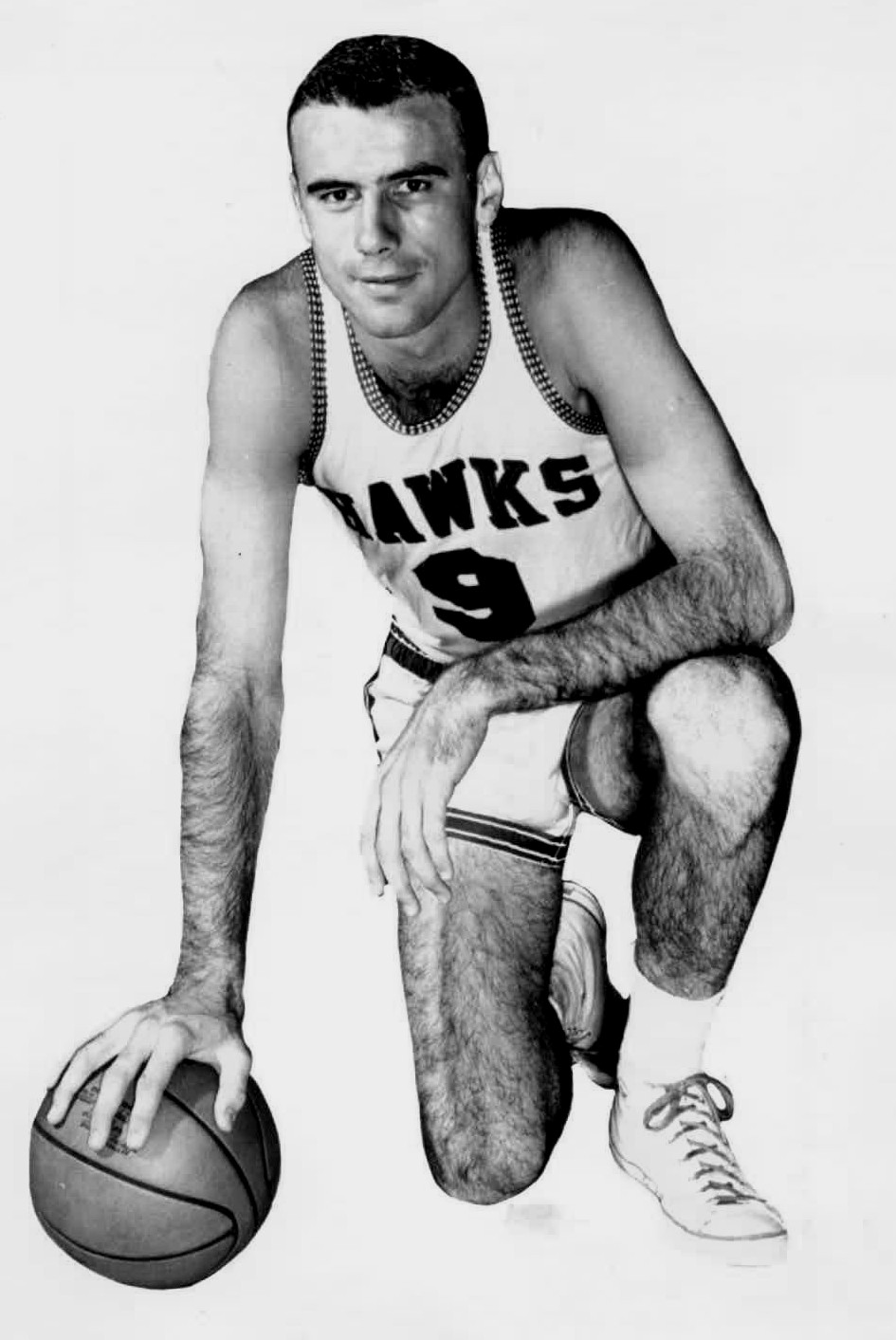
Pettit in 1962

In 1954, the Milwaukee Hawks selected Pettit second in the first round of the NBA draft after the Baltimore Bullets' selection of Frank Selvy. Pettit was initially reluctant to sign with the team before his third cousin, fellow NBA player Frank Brian, convinced him to do so. With $100 in the bank, he signed a contract with Hawks owner Ben Kerner for $11,000 – an all-time high for an NBA rookie then. Pettit's awkward ballhandling and a lack of strength to battle NBA bruisers weighing 200 pounds that early in his career, had Hawks coach Red Holzman move him from center, his position at LSU, to forward in his first training camp. "In college I played the standing pivot", he said in an April 1957 SPORT magazine interview. "My back was to the basket. In the pros, I'm always outside. Everything I do is facing the basket now. That was my chief difficulty in adjusting, the fact that I had never played forward before." Though many were skeptical about Pettit making the transition from college to the rough-and-tumble NBA, in 1955 he won the NBA Rookie of the Year Award after averaging 20.4 points and 13.8 rebounds per game. He became the second rookie to win all-NBA honors but the team finished last in the Western Division. After the season, the Hawks moved to St. Louis.

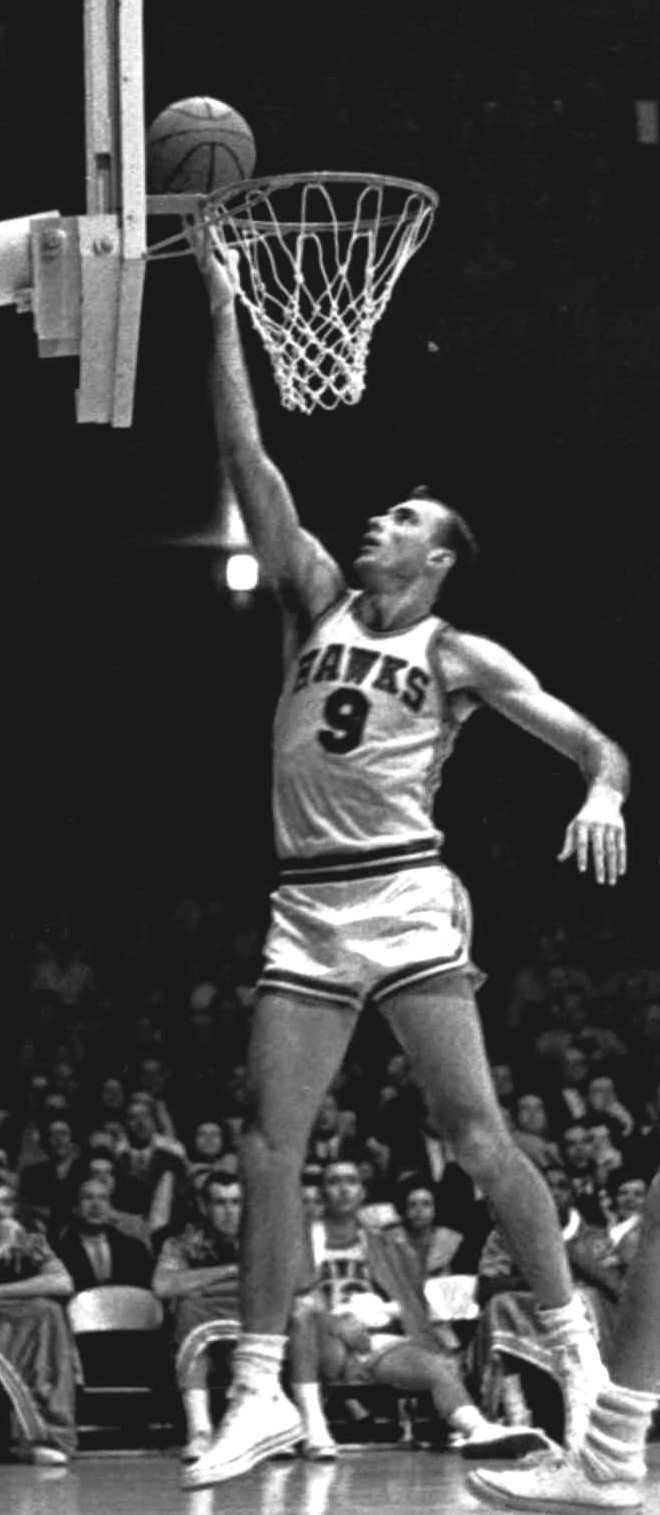
Pettit in 1957

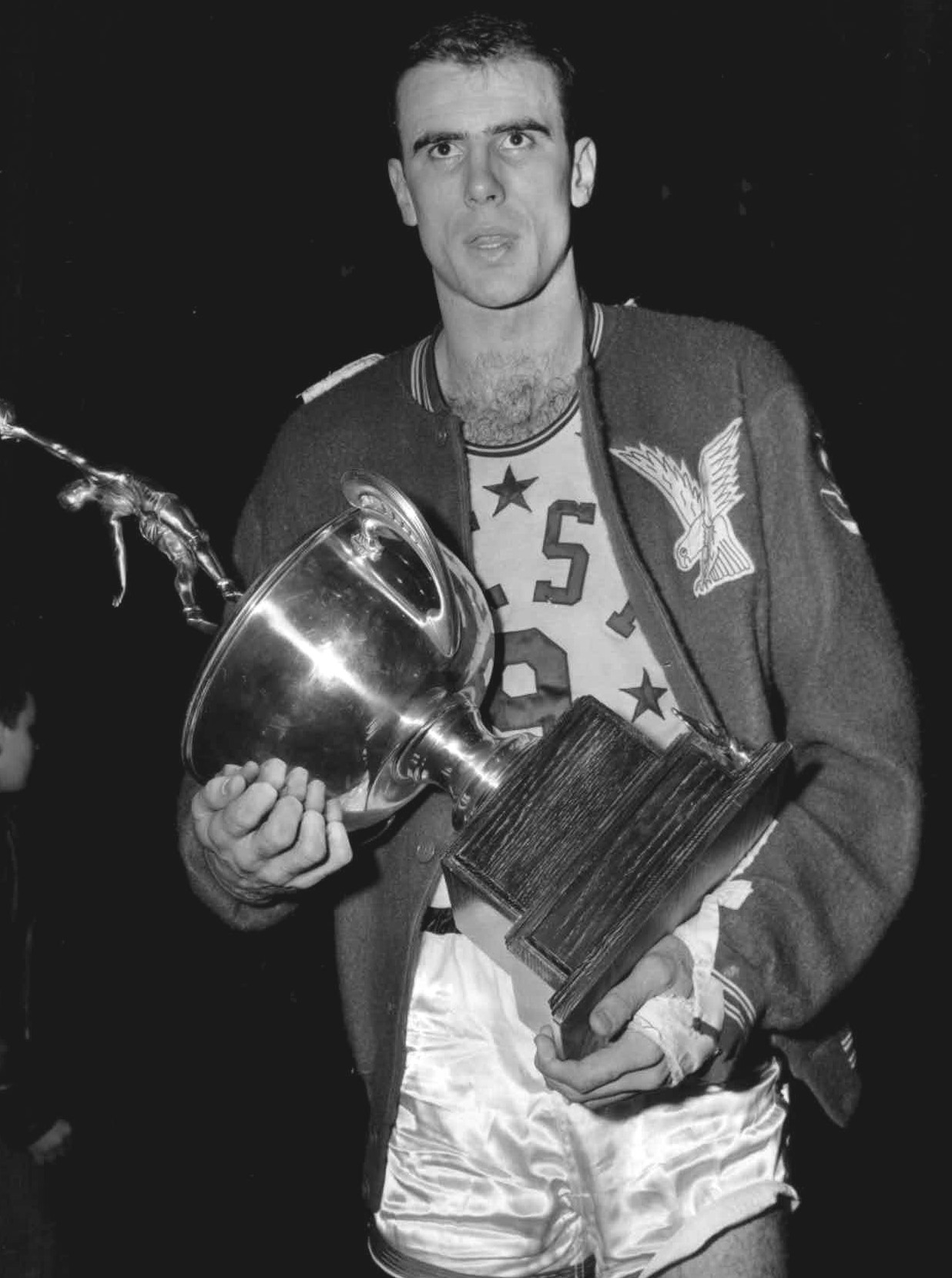
Pettit in 1958 after being named MVP of the All-Star Game

Pettit helped the Hawks improve during their first year in St. Louis in their winning of 33 games during 1955–56. In his second season, Pettit adjusted his game so that he would get to the free-throw line for easy points for his team and foul trouble for his opponents. Being a phenomenal offensive rebounder and an instinctive scorer, he told basketball historian Terry Pluto that "Offensive rebounds were worth eight to 12 points a night to me. Then I'd get another eight to 10 at the free-throw line. All I had to do was make a few jump shots and I was on my way to a good night." Pettit won his first scoring title with a 25.7 average, and led the league in rebounding (1164 for a 16.2 average). He was also named MVP of the 1956 NBA All-Star Game after scoring 20 points with 24 rebounds and 7 assists; he would win subsequent MVP All-Star Game honors in 1958, 1959, and 1962. He also won his first of two NBA regular season MVP awards (the other was in 1959).

Retooling before the 1956–57 season, the Hawks acquired Ed Macauley and rookie Cliff Hagan from the Boston Celtics for the draft rights to Bill Russell. The team added guard Slater Martin in an early-season deal with the New York Knicks while Alex Hannum arrived a few weeks later after being released by the Fort Wayne Pistons. Hannum became the team's third coach that season by taking over as player-coach with 31 games left on the schedule. Though they posted a 34–38 record in 1956–57, a series of tie-breaking playoff games against the Pistons and a three-game sweep of the Minneapolis Lakers had them in the NBA Finals. In Game 1 of the 1957 NBA Finals at the Boston Garden, Pettit scored 37 points as the Hawks shocked the Bill Russell-led Boston Celtics in double overtime. Pettit won his team the third game in the series with a late basket in St. Louis. His two free throws with six seconds left in Game 7 forced overtime, but Pettit's 39 points and 19 rebounds in 56 minutes weren't enough to win a double-overtime game. Pettit averaged 29.8 points and 16.8 rebounds per game during their 1957 playoff run.

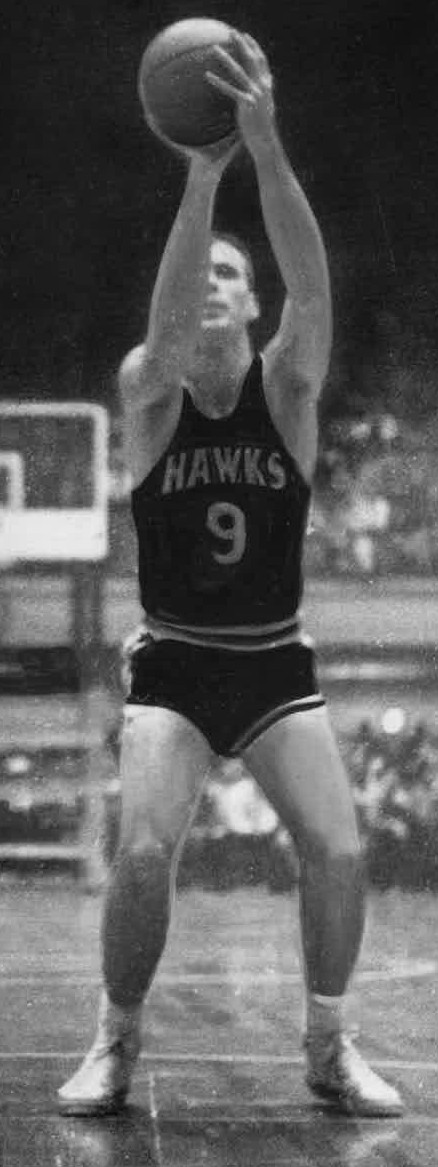
Pettit as a member of the Hawks

A franchise-record 41 wins and a division crown allowed the Hawks to get back at the Celtics in the 1958 NBA Finals. Pettit led the Hawks to an NBA Championship with a then-playoff record 50 points in the Hawks' 110–109 series-clinching victory in game 6. Pettit's 50 points stood alone as the most in a Finals close-out victory until it was matched by Giannis Antetokounmpo in 2021. Both teams would later meet in the 1960 and 1961 Finals, with Boston winning each time. For the season, Pettit scored 24.6 ppg and pulled down 17.4 rpg, and earned All-Star Game MVP honors with a performance that included 28 points and 26 rebounds. St. Louis finished at the top of the Western Division in each of the next three seasons. Pettit's league-leading scoring average of 29.2 points per game in the 1958–59 season was an NBA record at the time, and he was named the Sporting News NBA MVP.

In the 1960–61 season, Pettit averaged 27.9 points per game and pulled down 20.3 rebounds per game, making him one of only five players to ever break the 20 rpg barrier. He, along with Wilt Chamberlain, Jerry Lucas, and Nate Thurmond are the only four people who averaged more than twenty points and twenty rebounds in an NBA season. On February 18, 1961, Pettit scored a career-high 57 points and grabbed 28 rebounds in a 141–138 win over the Detroit Pistons.

In the following season, he scored a career-best 31.1 points per game, but the Hawks slipped to fourth place. After missing 30 games because of injuries, Pettit ended his career in 1965 still near the peak of his game. He was the first NBA player to eclipse the 20,000 points mark (20,880 for a 26.4 average). Of the 20,880 points he scored in the NBA, 6,182 of them (nearly 30 percent) came from free throws. His 12,849 rebounds were second-most in league history at the time he retired, and his 16.2 rebounds per game career average remains third only to Wilt Chamberlain and Bill Russell.

He was an NBA All-Star in each of his 11 seasons, was named to the All-NBA First Team ten times, and was named to the All-NBA Second Team once. Pettit still holds the top two NBA All-Star Game rebounding performances with 26 in 1958 and 27 in 1962, and has the second-highest All-Star Game points per game average with 20.4 (behind only Oscar Robertson). His four All-Star MVPs are tied with Kobe Bryant for the most in NBA history. Pettit averaged at least 20 points per game and at least 12 rebounds per game in each of his 11 NBA seasons. He never finished below seventh in the NBA scoring race and no other retired player in NBA history other than Pettit and Alex Groza (who played only two seasons) has averaged more than 20 points per game in every season they've played.

In 1970, Pettit was inducted into the Naismith Memorial Basketball Hall of Fame. He is one of four players who was named to all four NBA anniversary teams (25th, 35th, 50th, 75th), along with Bob Cousy, George Mikan, and Bill Russell.

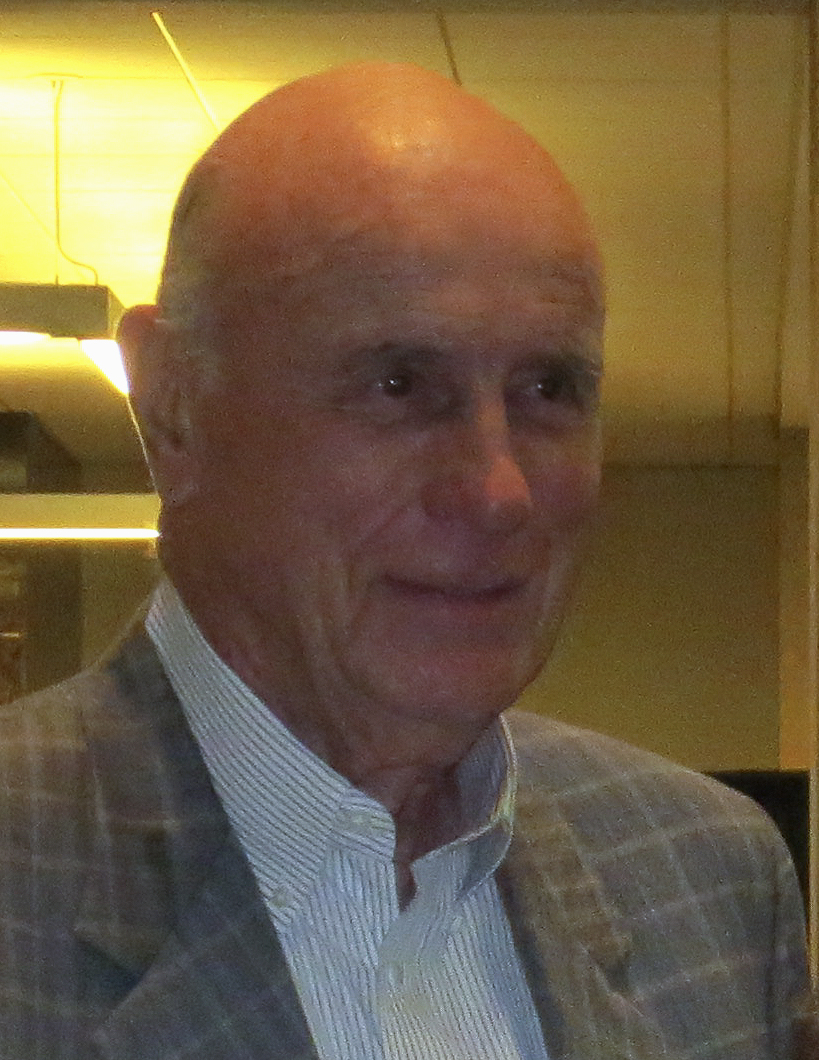
Pettit in 2013

== Personal life and death ==
Pettit worked in the banking industry in Baton Rouge and Metairie for 23 years before entering financial consulting in 1988. In 2006, he retired from Equitas Capital Investors, a financial consulting company that he co-founded.

He was married to his wife Carole, who died in 2010, and had three children and 10 grandchildren.

Bob Pettit died on September 23, 2026, at the age of 93. His alma mater LSU announced his death a day later.

== NBA career statistics ==
Legend
GP	Games played	GS	Games started	MPG	Minutes per game
FG%	Field goal percentage	3P%	3-point field goal percentage	FT%	Free throw percentage
RPG	Rebounds per game	APG	Assists per game	SPG	Steals per game
BPG	Blocks per game	PPG	Points per game	**Bold**	Career high
†	Won an NBA championship	*	Led the league	‡	NBA record

=== Regular season ===
Year	Team	GP	MPG	FG%	FT%	RPG	APG	PPG
1954–55	Milwaukee	72	36.9	.407	.751	13.8	3.2	20.4
1955–56	St. Louis	72	38.8	.429	.736	16.2*	2.6	25.7*
1956–57	St. Louis	71	35.1	.415	.773	14.6	1.9	24.7
1957–58†	St. Louis	70	36.1	.410	.749	17.4	2.2	24.6
1958–59	St. Louis	72*	39.9	.438	.759	16.4	3.1	29.2*
1959–60	St. Louis	72	40.2	.438	.753	17.0	3.6	26.1
1960–61	St. Louis	76	39.8	.447	.724	**20.3**	3.4	27.9
1961–62	St. Louis	78	**42.1**	.450	.771	18.7	**3.7**	**31.1**
1962–63	St. Louis	79	39.1	.446	.774	15.1	3.1	28.4
1963–64	St. Louis	**80**	41.2	**.463**	.789	15.3	3.2	27.4
1964–65	St. Louis	50	35.1	.429	**.820**	12.4	2.6	22.5
Career		792	38.8	.436	.761	16.2	3.0	26.4
All-Star		11	32.7	.420	.775	16.1‡	2.0	20.3

=== Playoffs ===
Year	Team	GP	MPG	FG%	FT%	RPG	APG	PPG
1956	St. Louis	8	34.3	.367	**.843**	10.5	2.3	19.1
1957	St. Louis	10	43.0	.414	.767	16.8	2.5	29.8
1958†	St. Louis	11	39.1	.391	.729	16.5	1.8	24.2
1959	St. Louis	6	42.8	.423	.785	12.5	2.3	27.8
1960	St. Louis	**14**	41.1	.442	.754	15.8	**3.7**	26.1
1961	St. Louis	12	**43.8**	.412	.757	**17.6**	3.2	28.6
1963	St. Louis	11	42.1	**.459**	.778	15.1	3.0	**31.8**
1964	St. Louis	12	41.2	.412	.835	14.5	2.8	21.0
1965	St. Louis	4	23.8	.366	.800	6.0	2.0	11.5
Career		88	40.3	.418	.774	14.8	2.7	25.5

== Head coaching record ==
Team	Year	G	W	L	W–L%	Finish	PG	PW	PL	PW–L%	Result
St. Louis	1961–62	6	4	2	.667	4th in Western	—	—	—	—	Missed playoffs
Career		6	4	2	.667		0	0	0	–	

== See also ==
- List of NBA career scoring leaders
- List of NBA franchise career scoring leaders
- List of NBA career rebounding leaders
- List of NBA annual rebounding leaders
- List of NBA single-game playoff scoring leaders
- List of NCAA Division I men's basketball players with 60 or more points in a game
