= NBA anniversary teams =

Honorary teams to commemorate the NBA's anniversaries

The National Basketball Association (NBA) has named four teams throughout its history that commemorate a milestone league anniversary by honoring its greatest all-time players. The NBA considers 1946 to be its founding year. The league was formed in 1949 with the merger of the Basketball Association of America (BAA) and the National Basketball League (NBL). The NBL began play in 1937, while the BAA started in 1946.

The NBA 25th Anniversary Team was named in 1971. Selections were restricted to retired players and were intended to be an all-time All-NBA Team, consisting of four guards, four forwards, and two centers. In 1980, eleven players were named to the 35th anniversary team, chosen by the Pro Basketball Writers Association. Players were selected regardless of their position. Just four of the silver anniversary members were chosen. The only two active players on the 50-man ballot, Kareem Abdul-Jabbar and Julius Erving, were both selected.

For the league's 50th anniversary in 1996, an appreciably larger list was named. Dubbed the 50 Greatest Players in NBA History, the 50 members included 11 who were still active. All 11 members of the 35th anniversary team were selected. Eight of the 10 players from the 25th anniversary team were chosen, with Bob Davies and Joe Fulks—who both last played in the 1950s—being omitted. Forty-seven of the 50 gathered at the 1997 NBA All-Star Game in Cleveland, where they were honored at halftime. Missing were Pete Maravich, who had died at age 40 in 1988; Shaquille O'Neal, who had a knee injury and was advised not to fly; and Jerry West, who was also told to not fly due to an ear infection. Due to a tie, 76 players were named to the NBA 75th Anniversary Team in 2021. Eleven active players were named, and all 50 members of the 50th anniversary team were included. Bob Cousy, George Mikan, Bob Pettit, and Bill Russell are the only four players to be named to all four anniversary teams.

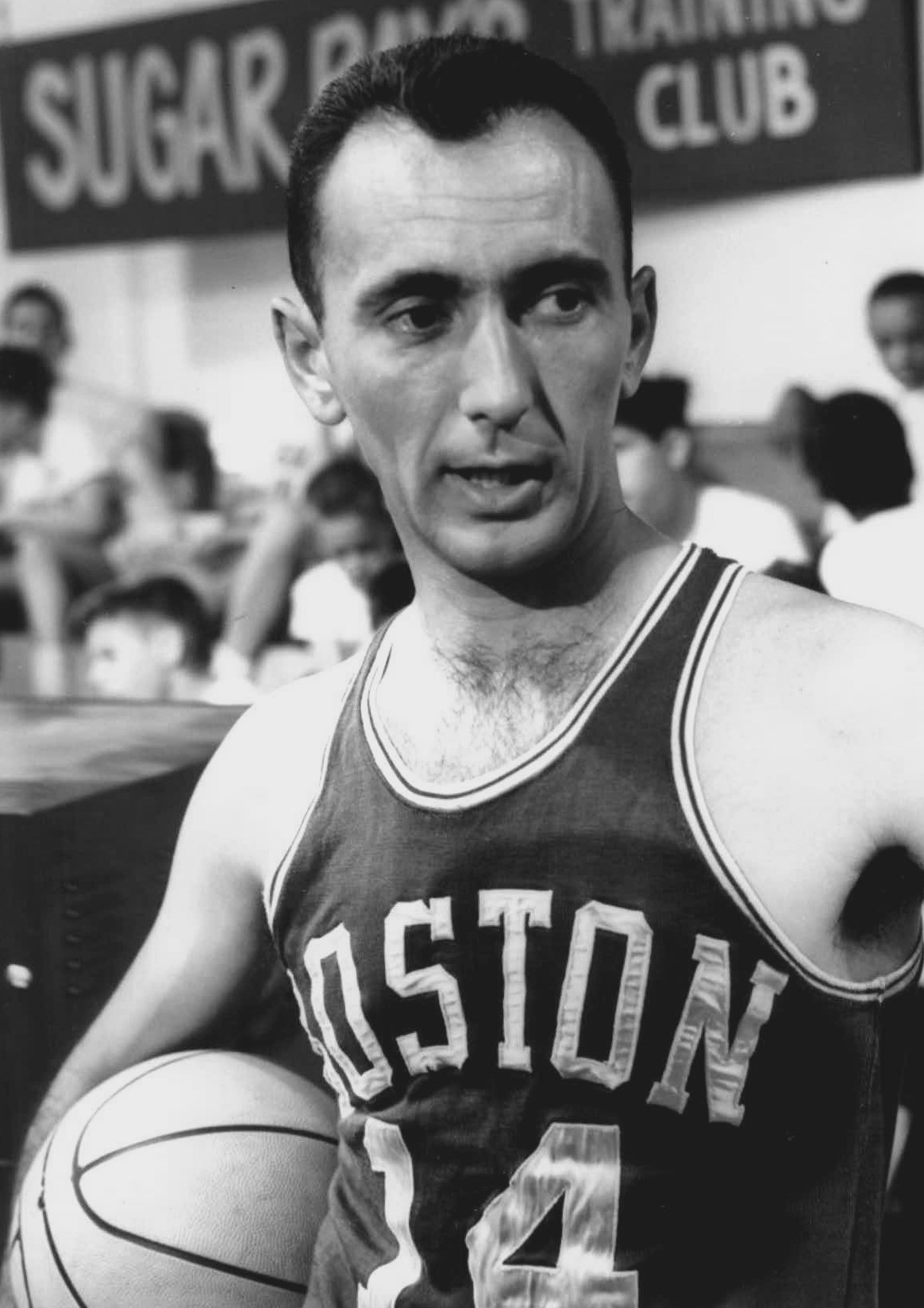
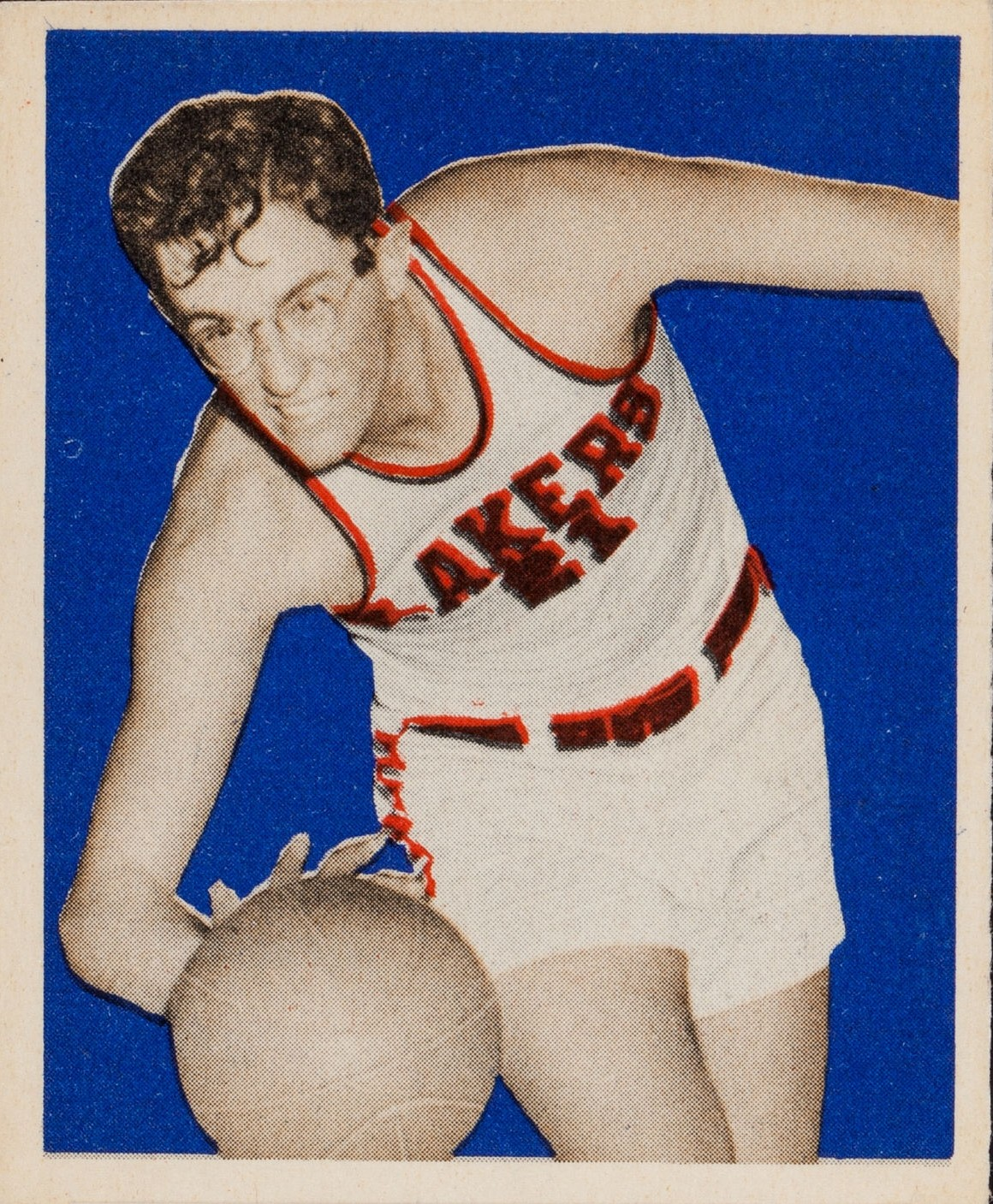
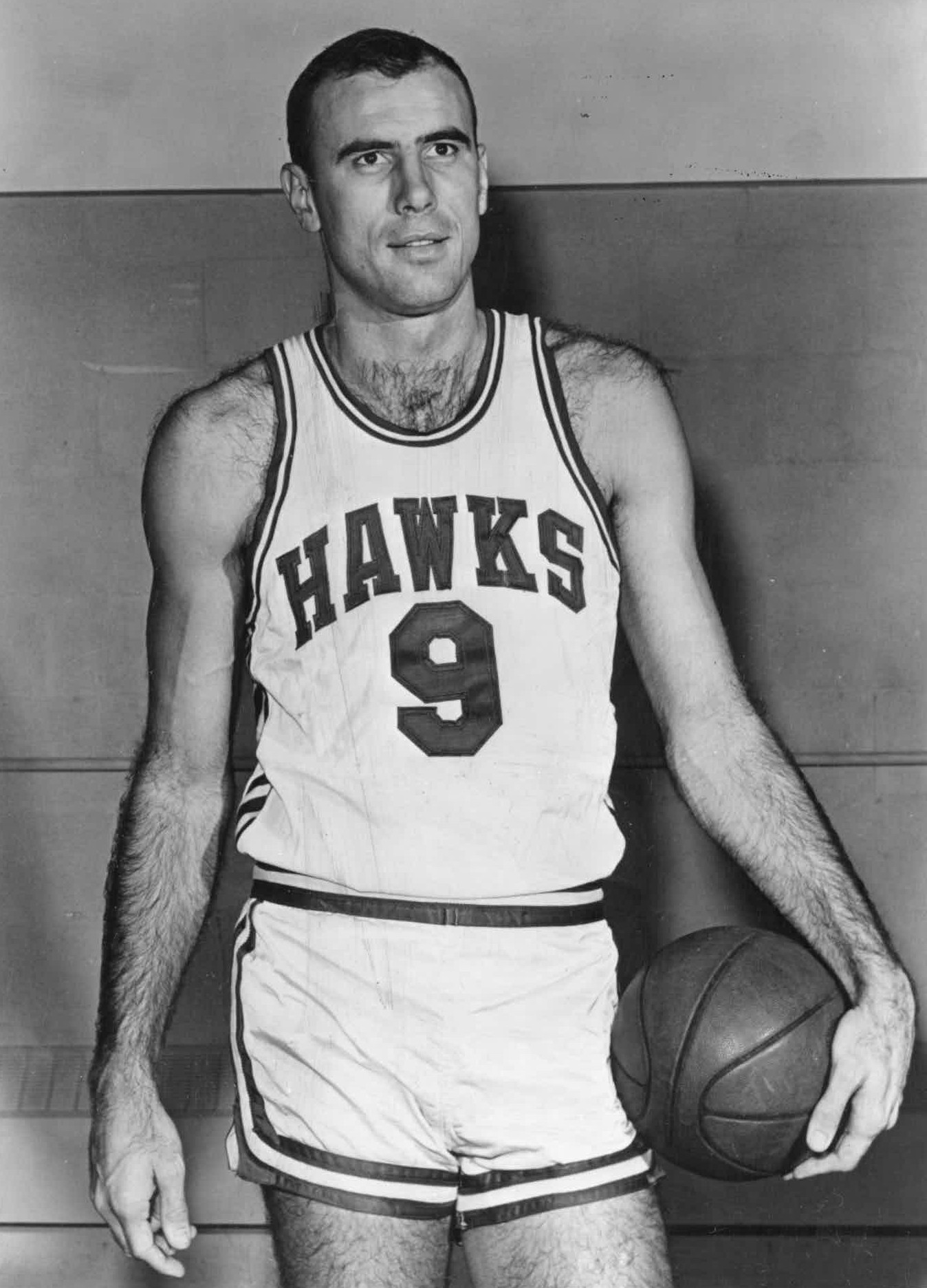
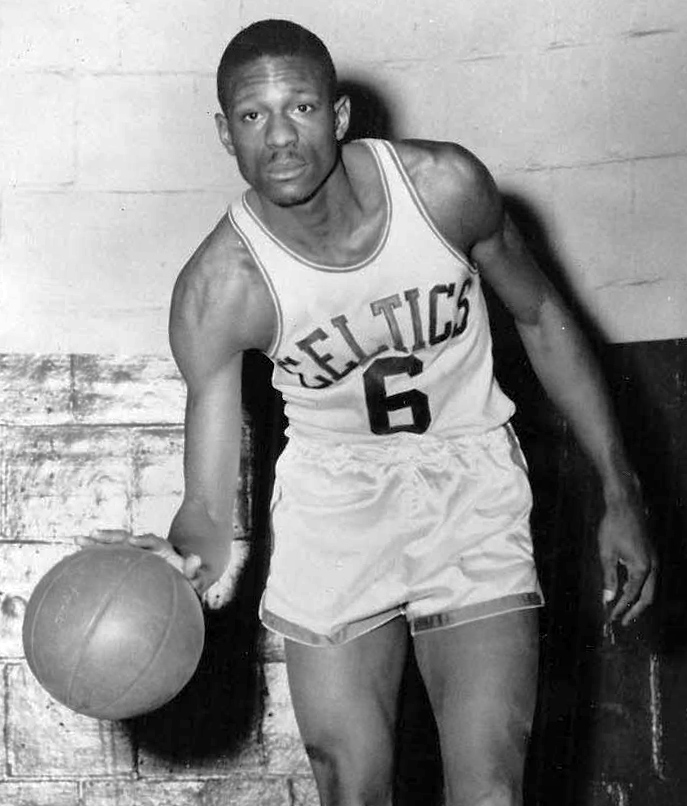
Only four players have been named to all of the NBA anniversary teams: (left to right) Bob Cousy, George Mikan, Bob Pettit, and Bill Russell.

NBA anniversary teams
Team	Year	Players	
Team	Year	Total	Active
25th	1971	10	0
35th	1980	11	2
50th	1996	50	11
75th	2021	76	11
