= Deaths in January 1993 =

The following is a list of notable deaths in January 1993.

Entries for each day are listed alphabetically by surname. A typical entry lists information in the following sequence:

- Name, age, country of citizenship at birth, subsequent country of citizenship (if applicable), reason for notability, cause of death (if known), and reference.

== January 1993 ==
=== 1 ===
- Ross Bass, 74, American florist and politician, United States Representative (1955-1964) and Senator (1964-1967).
- Italo Bellini, 77, Italian Olympic sports shooter (1952).
- Helmut Bischoff, 84, German Nazi official and SS officer.
- June Clayworth, 87, American actress.
- Shalom Cohen, 66, Israeli politician.
- Tony Durley, 59, English cricketer.
- Phyllis Hill, 72, American dancer and actress, lung cancer.
- Raymond Jack Last, 89, Australian surgeon and anatomist.
- Laurence Marks, 77, American television writer (Hogan's Heroes, M*A*S*H, The New Phil Silvers Show).
- George R. Mather, 81, United States Army general.
- Jean Mayer, 72, French-American scientist.
- Cathie Marsh, 41, British sociologist and statistician, breast cancer.
- Totò Mignone, 86, Italian dancer and actor.
- Claude Smeal, 74, Australian Olympic long-distance runner (1952).

=== 2 ===
- Alfred T. Airth, 86, American politician.
- Tom Barling, 86, English cricketer.
- Sean Devereux, 28, British Salesian missionary and aid worker, murdered.
- Heinz Kohlhaas, 80, German Olympic boxer (1932).
- Vladimir Makogonov, 88, Soviet-Azerbaijan chess player.
- Rudi Supek, 79, Croatian sociologist and philosopher.
- Valerie Wellington, 33, American opera and blues singer, intracranial aneurysm.
- Gerald Whelan, 67, American politician.

=== 3 ===
- Leah Feldman, 93, Odessa-born anarchist garment worker.
- Johnny Most, 69, American sportscaster, heart attack.
- Simone Vaudry, 86, French film actress.
- Bill Walls, 80, American football player (New York Giants), and coach.

=== 4 ===
- Danie Craven, 82, South African rugby player and coach.
- J. J. Griffin Jr., 79, American politician.
- Leonard Kibrick, 68, American child actor, cancer.
- Oscar Lindelöf, 89, Swedish Olympic wrestler (1928, 1932).
- Shannon Boyd-Bailey McCune, 79, American geographer.
- Navalpakkam Parthasarthy, 92, Indian geneticist and United Nations official.
- Harold Page Smith, 88, American naval admiral.
- Ernest Leo Unterkoefler, 75, American Roman Catholic prelate, Bishop of Charleston (1964–1990).

=== 5 ===
- Juan Benet, 65, Spanish novelist, brain cancer.
- Yuri Bezmenov, 53, Soviet-Canadian defected KGB agent and journalist, heart attack.
- George Roseborough Collins, 75, American art historian, Alzheimer's disease.
- Westley Allan Dodd, 31, American convicted serial killer, execution by hanging.
- Einar Granath, 56, Swedish Olympic ice hockey player (1960).
- Nicholas Mayall, 86, American astronomer, diabetes.
- Eliseo Morales, 94, Spanish Olympic rower (1924).
- Sisworo Gautama Putra, 54, Indonesian film director.
- Maynard Street, 94, American football and basketball coach.
- Florian Zogg, 92, Swiss Olympic cross-country skier (1928).

=== 6 ===
- Archduchess Elisabeth of Austria, 70, Austrian royal.
- Ștefan Baciu, 74, Romanian-Brazilian poet, novelist, publicist and academic.
- Zoltán Csányi, 80, Hungarian Olympic athlete (1936).
- Tad Danielewski, 71, Polish-American film director, cancer.
- Dizzy Gillespie, 75, American jazz trumpeter, pancreatic cancer.
- Richard Mortensen, 82, Danish painter.
- Rudolf Nureyev, 54, Russian ballet dancer and choreographer, AIDS.
- Townsend Tapley, 79, American baseball player.

=== 7 ===
- Richard Branda, 57, American actor.
- John Cowley, 87, English army officer.
- Toshihiko Izutsu, 78, Japanese religious scholar.
- Susi Jeans, 81, Austrian-British organist, teacher and musicologist.
- Fred Kohler, Jr., 81, American actor.

=== 8 ===
- Hans Bertram, 86, German aviator, screenwriter and film director.
- Theo Bruins, 63, Dutch pianist.
- Harry Gregory, 90, Australian rules footballer.
- Ron Grove, 73, Australian rules footballer.
- Asif Nawaz, 56, Pakistani general, heart attack.
- George Rudé, 82, British marxist historian.
- Leonard A. Scheele, 85, American physician, surgeon general (1948–1956).
- Herbert Trantow, 89, German film score composer.
- Hakija Turajlić, 56-57, Bosnian politician and deputy prime minister (since 1992), killed in action.

=== 9 ===
- Bruce Campbell, 80, English ornithologist.
- Anton Crihan, 99, Moldovan politician, author, economist, and journalist, cancer.
- Sir Paul Hasluck, 87, Australian politician, governor-general (1969–1974), MP (1949–1969), prostate cancer.
- Keith Mwila, 26, Zambian boxer and Olympic medalist (1984).
- Viveca Serlachius, 69, Finnish-Swedish actress.
- Judit Tóth, 86, Hungarian gymnast and Olympic medalist (1928, 1936).
- Janet Vaughan, 93, English physiologist.

=== 10 ===
- Diana Adams, 66, American ballet dancer.
- Adam Aston, 90, Polish-English singer.
- Maurice Brooks, 92, American naturalist.
- Thomas B. Curtis, 81, American politician, member of the United States House of Representatives (1951-1969).
- Iván García, 45, Venezuelan footballer.
- Luther Gulick, 100, American social scientist.
- Georges Mounin, 82, French linguist.
- Raja Perempuan Zainab II, 75, Malaysian royal.

=== 11 ===
- Roberto Lucifero d'Aprigliano, 89, Italian lawyer and politician.
- Lacey Fosburgh, 50, American writer (Closing Time: The True Story of the Goodbar Murder), breast cancer.
- Frank Quinn, 65, American baseball player (Boston Red Sox).
- Makhdoom Muhammad Zaman Talib-ul-Mola, 73, Pakistani politician, scholar and poet.
- Tommy Walker, 77, Scottish football player.

=== 12 ===
- Earl Browne, 81, American baseball player (Pittsburgh Pirates, Philadelphia Phillies), and manager.
- Józef Czapski, 96, Polish artist, author, and critic.
- Fred Koenig, 61, American baseball, coach and director.
- Pierre Nihant, 67, Belgian Olympic cyclist (1948).
- Joe Orrell, 75, American baseball player (Detroit Tigers).
- Yehezkel Streichman, 87, Israeli painter.
- Margit Tøsdal, 74, Norwegian politician.
- Tito Warnholtz, 86, German Olympic field hockey player (1936).

=== 13 ===
- Albert Wheeler Coffrin, 73, American district judge (United States District Court for the District of Vermont).
- Edivaldo Martins Fonseca, 30, Brazilian footballer, traffic collision.
- Camargo Guarnieri, 85, Brazilian composer.
- Helene J. Kantor, 73, American archaeologist and art historian.
- Ndrek Luca, 65, Albanian stage, film and theater actor.
- René Pleven, 91, French politician and prime minister (1950–1951, 1951–1952), heart failure.
- Harlan Pyle, 87, American baseball player (Cincinnati Reds).
- Alexander Soper, 88, American art historian.
- Charles Tillon, 95, French politician.

=== 14 ===
- Victor Abens, 80, Luxembourgish politician.
- Victor Warrender, 1st Baron Bruntisfield, 93, British politician.
- Sathasivam Krishnakumar, 33, Sri Lankan Tamil rebel and Tamil Tigers leader, suicide.
- Manfred Lachs, 78, Polish diplomat and jurist.
- Pepita Ferrer Lucas, 54, Catalan chess player.
- Robert A. Mattey, 82, American special effects artist (Jaws, Mary Poppins, The Absent-Minded Professor).
- José Comas Quesada, 64, Spanish watercolor painter.

=== 15 ===
- Billy Brown, 82, English football player.
- Sammy Cahn, 79, American lyricist ("Ain't That a Kick in the Head?", "Let It Snow! Let It Snow! Let It Snow!", "It's Been a Long, Long Time"), heart failure.
- Roland English, 84, Canadian politician, member of the House of Commons of Canada (1957-1963).
- Arthur Wallis Exell, 91, English botanist.
- J. Allen Frear, Jr., 89, American businessman and politician, member of the United States Senate (1949-1961).
- Lucien Grosso, 60, French Olympic bobsledder (1956).
- William G. Hardwick, 82, American politician.
- Henry Iba, 88, American basketball coach.
- Annemarie von Gabain, 91, German scholar.

=== 16 ===
- Phil Chambers, 76, American actor.
- Freddie 'Red' Cochrane, 77, American boxer.
- Glenn Corbett, 59, American actor (The Doctors, Midway, Dallas), lung cancer.
- Florence Desmond, 87, English actress.
- Ernest Granier, 85, French Olympic sailor (1936).
- Rafik Khachatryan, 55, Armenian sculptor.
- Karl-Heinz Scherzinger, 48, German Olympic cross-country skier (1968).
- Stan Sheriff, 60, American football player (Pittsburgh Steelers, San Francisco 49ers, Cleveland Browns), coach, and college athletics administrator.
- Jón Páll Sigmarsson, 32, Icelandic bodybuilder and strongman, aortic rupture.
- Đoko Slijepčević, 85, Serbian historian.
- Svetozar Vujović, 52, Bosnian and Yugoslav football player, manager and Olympian (1964).
- Atsushi Yamatoya, 55, Japanese film director, screenwriter and actor, esophageal cancer.

=== 17 ===
- Barbara Buczek, 53, Polish composer.
- Julio Coll, 73, Spanish screenwriter and film director.
- Harry Gingell, 76, Australian rules footballer.
- Albert Hourani, 77, English historian.
- Nick Polly, 75, American baseball player (Brooklyn Dodgers, Boston Red Sox).
- Liu Yunchang, 80, Chinese Olympic basketball player (1936).
- Vilmos Zombori, 87, Romanian footballer.

=== 18 ===
- Karl Bosl, 84, German historian.
- Alfredo Bovet, 83, Swiss-Italian cyclist.
- Eleanor Alice Burford, 86, English novelist.
- Jack Cronin, 89, American football player (Providence Steam Roller).
- Arthur Donaldson, 91, Scottish journalist and politician.
- Gordon Higginson, 74, British spiritualist medium.
- C. A. Trypanis, 83, Greek classicist, literary critic, and poet.
- Richard Waring, 82, English-American actor.
- Wasif Ali Wasif, 64, Pakistani writer, poet and sufi.
- Dionysios Zakythinos, 87-88, Greek historian.

=== 19 ===
- Holden Furber, 89, American academic.
- Reginald Hewetson, 84, British Army officer, Adjutant-General to the Forces.
- William LeMassena, 76, American actor (All That Jazz, As the World Turns, See You in the Morning), lung cancer.
- Reginald Lewis, 50, American businessman and philanthropist, brain cancer.
- Margaret Marquis, 73, Canadian-American film actress.
- Nagindas Parekh, 89, Indian writer and literary critic.
- Chris Street, 20, American college basketball player, automobile crash.
- Mieczysław Szumiec, 85, Polish footballer.
- Antonello Trombadori, 75, Italian politician, art critic and journalist.

=== 20 ===
- Joe Albertson, 86, American businessman.
- Joseph Anthony, 80, American playwright and actor.
- Françoise Dior, 60, French socialite and neo-Nazifinancier, lung cancer.
- Bindeshwari Dubey, 72, Indian freedom fighter, trade unionist and politician.
- Aleksandr Gorshkov, 64, Soviet Olympic athlete (1956).
- Audrey Hepburn, 63, British actress (Breakfast at Tiffany's, Roman Holiday, My Fair Lady), Oscar winner (1954), appendix cancer.
- Christos Kapralos, 83, Greek artist.
- Piet Peters, 71, Dutch Olympic cyclist (1948).

=== 21 ===
- Felice Borel, 78, Italian football player.
- Charlie Gehringer, 89, American Hall of Fame baseball player (Detroit Tigers).
- Lotte Laserstein, 94, German-Swedish painter.
- Leo Löwenthal, 92, German sociologist.
- Ferdinanda Martini-Pautasso, 69, Italian-born Swiss Olympic diver (1952).
- Dimitris Nikolaidis, 71, Greek actor.

=== 22 ===
- Kōbō Abe, 68, Japanese writer (The Woman in the Dunes), heart attack.
- Alexander Bodon, 86, Dutch architect.
- Patricia Brooks, 59, Lyric soprano, actress, and opera singer, multiple sclerosis.
- Jim Pollard, 70, American basketball player (Minneapolis Lakers) and coach.
- Armand Raymond, 80, American ice hockey player (Montreal Canadiens).
- Hans Schneider, 79, Austrian ice hockey player and Olympian (1948).
- Erik W. Tawaststjerna, 76, Finnish musicologist, pianist and music teacher.
- Brett Weston, 81, American photographer, stroke.

=== 23 ===
- John Robert Brown, 83, American circuit judge (United States Court of Appeals for the Fifth Circuit).
- Thomas A. Dorsey, 93, American gospel musician, Alzheimer's disease.
- Kong Fei, 82, Chinese politician.
- Charles Greenlee, 65, American jazz trombonist.
- Robert Sutton Harrington, 50, American astronomer, esophageal cancer.
- Keith Laumer, 67, American science fiction author.
- Gábor Péter, 86, Hungarian communist politician.
- Wayne Raney, 71, American country singer and harmonica player, cancer.
- Li Ziming, 90, Chinese martial artist.

=== 24 ===
- Archduchess Assunta of Austria, 90, Austrian-American royal.
- Don Bassman, 64, American sound engineer (Patton, Die Hard, The Abyss), Oscar winner (1971).
- Héctor De Bourgoing, 58, French football player.
- Gustav Ernesaks, 84, Estonian composer.
- Detlef Gerstenberg, 35, East Germany hammer thrower and Olympian (1980), liver cirrhosis.
- John A. Lafore, Jr., 87, American politician, member of the United States House of Representatives (1957-1961).
- Thurgood Marshall, 84, American judge, associate justice of the Supreme Court (1967–1991), heart failure.
- Rob McEwen, 66, Australian rules footballer.
- Éliane Montel, 94, French physicist and chemist.
- Uğur Mumcu, 50, Turkish investigative journalist, murdered.
- Eino Pentti, 86, American Olympic runner (1932, 1936).
- Leland Shaffer, 80, American football player (New York Giants).
- Henry Abel Smith, 92, British Army officer.
- Sergey Zakharov, 92, Soviet-Russian painter.

=== 25 ===
- Frank Freidel, 77, American historian and biographer.
- Nils Kristen Jacobsen, 84, Norwegian politician.
- Leah Neuberger, 77, American table tennis player.
- Hedi Amara Nouira, 81, Tunisian politician, prime minister (1970–1980).
- Pres Slack, 84, American basketball player.

=== 26 ===
- Erminio Bolzan, 78, Italian Olympic boxer (1936).
- Axel Freiherr von dem Bussche-Streithorst, 73, German soldier, resistance member, and diplomat.
- Lucia M. Cormier, 83, American politician, member of the Maine House of Representatives (1947–1950, 1953–1960).
- Kenneth Gaburo, 66, American composer.
- Jan Gies, 87, Dutch resistance member, hid Anne Frank, kidney failure.
- Robert Jacobsen, 80, Danish artist.
- Jeanne Sauvé, 70, Canadian politician, governor general (1984–1990), MP (1972–1984), Hodgkin's lymphoma.

=== 27 ===
- Srđan Aleksić, 26, Bosnian Serb amateur actor and soldier, beaten to death.
- Nils Aall Barricelli, 81, Norwegian-Italian mathematician.
- Harold Beverage, 99, American inventor and researcher.
- Allan Buchanan, 76, Australian rules footballer.
- J. T. King, 80, American football player and coach.
- Leon Mandrake, 81, Canadian magician.
- Edward P. Morgan, 82, American journalist and writer.
- Erik Mørk, 67, Danish film actor, traffic collision.
- Syed Shujaat Ali Qadri, 51-52, Pakistani Grand Mufti, heart attack.
- Vern Wilson, 61, Australian rules footballer.

=== 28 ===
- Frank Aked Sr., 90, Australian rules footballer.
- Sir Donald Douglas, 81, Scottish surgeon.
- André the Giant, 46, French professional wrestler (WWF) and actor (The Princess Bride), congestive heart failure.
- Erik Herseth, 100, Norwegian Olympic sailor (1920).
- Helen Sawyer Hogg, 87, American-Canadian astronomer.
- Aben Kandel, 95, American screenwriter (I Was a Teenage Werewolf).
- Vern Kennedy, 85, American baseball player.
- Anatoly Parfyonov, 67, Soviet heavyweight Greco-Roman wrestler and Olympic champion (1956)..
- Oliver Poole, 1st Baron Poole, 81, British politician, soldier and businessman.
- John Steadman, 83, American actor (The Hills Have Eyes, The Longest Yard, Gator).
- Kay Swift, 95, American composer.
- Tim Ward, 75, English football player and manager.
- Polo Welfring, 66, Luxembourgian Olympic gymnast (1948).
- Hannah Wilke, 52, American artist, lymphoma.

=== 29 ===
- Adetokunbo Ademola, 86, Nigerian jurist.
- Ángel Garma, 88, Spanish-Argentine psychoanalyst.
- Gustav Hasford, 45, American novelist (The Short-Timers) and screenwriter (Full Metal Jacket), heart failure.
- Harris Hull, 83, American brigadier general.
- Ron Kostelnik, 53, American gridiron football player (Green Bay Packers, Baltimore Colts), heart attack.
- Lars Larsson, 81, Swedish steeplechase runner and Olympian (1936).
- Eva Remaeus, 42, Swedish actress, brain tumor.
- Nancy Teed, 43, Canadian politician, traffic collision.

=== 30 ===
- Julia Davis Adams, 92, American author and journalist.
- Ryōichi Hattori, 85, Japanese pop and jazz composer.
- Denise Kramer-Scholer, 82, Swiss Olympic fencer (1936).
- James LuValle, 80, American Olympic athlete (1936), and scientist.
- Dorothy Miles, 61, Welsh poet.
- Taikichiro Mori, 88, Japanese businessman and economist.
- Svetoslav Roerich, 88, Russian painter.
- Toni Wieser, 72, Austrian Olympic ski jumper (1948).
- John Oulton Wisdom, 84, Irish philosopher.
- Alexandra of Yugoslavia, 71, Greek-Yugoslavian royal and queen consort (1944–1945), cancer.

=== 31 ===
- Paul R. Anderson, 85, American academic.
- Ernő Lendvaï, 67, Hungarian music theorist.
- John Poulson, 82, British designer and businessman.
- Frithjof Ulleberg, 81, Norwegian football player and Olympian (1936).
- Douglas Williams, 75, American sound engineer (Patton, Silver Streak, The Rose), Oscar winner (1971).
