= 76ers–Celtics rivalry =

National Basketball Association rivalry

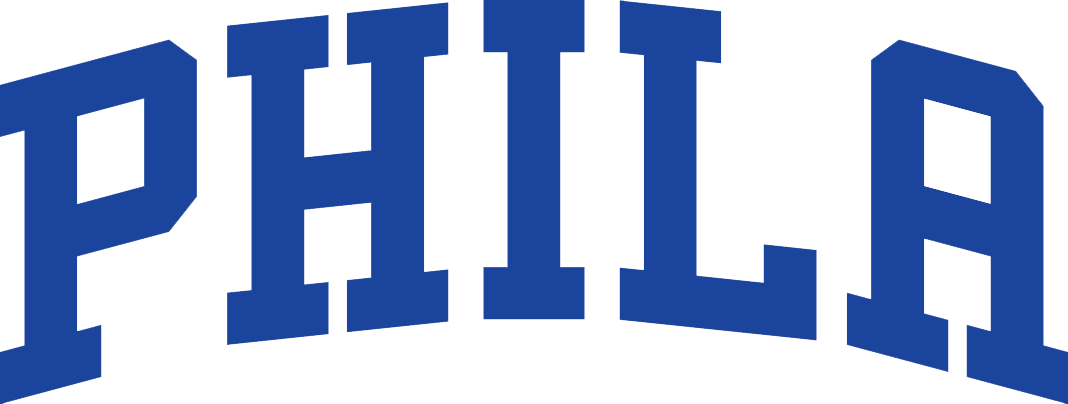
- Philadelphia 76ers Boston Celtics
- First meeting: November 30, 1949; Nationals 87, Celtics 71
- Latest meeting: November 10, 2026; Celtics 123, 76ers 101
- Next meeting: January 21, 2027 (regular season)

Statistics
- Total meetings: 599
- All-time series: 345–254 (BOS)
- Regular season series: 275–200 (BOS)
- Postseason results: 69–54 (BOS)
- Longest win streak: BOS W20
- Current win streak: BOS W1

Postseason history
- 1953 Eastern Division Semifinals: Celtics won, 2–0; 1954 Eastern Division Finals: Nationals won, 2–0; 1955 Eastern Division Finals: Nationals won, 3–1; 1956 Eastern Division Semifinals: Nationals won, 2–1; 1957 Eastern Division Finals: Celtics won, 3–0; 1959 Eastern Division Finals: Celtics won, 4–3; 1961 Eastern Division Finals: Celtics won, 4–1; 1965 Eastern Division Finals: Celtics won, 4–3; 1966 Eastern Division Finals: Celtics won, 4–1; 1967 Eastern Division Finals: 76ers won, 4–1; 1968 Eastern Division Finals: Celtics won, 4–3; 1969 Eastern Division Semifinals: Celtics won, 4–1; 1977 Eastern Conference Semifinals: 76ers won, 4–3; 1980 Eastern Conference Finals: 76ers won, 4–1; 1981 Eastern Conference Finals: Celtics won, 4–3; 1982 Eastern Conference Finals: 76ers won, 4–3; 1985 Eastern Conference Finals: Celtics won, 4–1; 2002 Eastern Conference First Round: Celtics won, 3–2; 2012 Eastern Conference Semifinals: Celtics won, 4–3; 2018 Eastern Conference Semifinals: Celtics won, 4–1; 2020 Eastern Conference First Round: Celtics won, 4–0; 2023 Eastern Conference Semifinals: Celtics won, 4–3; 2026 Eastern Conference First Round: 76ers won, 4–3

Locations of the Philadelphia 76ers and Boston Celtics.

The 76ers–Celtics rivalry is a National Basketball Association (NBA) rivalry between the Philadelphia 76ers and the Boston Celtics. The two teams have the most meetings in the NBA playoffs; they have played each other in 23 series (and the 1954 Eastern Division Round Robin), with the Celtics winning 15 of them. The 76ers are considered to be the Celtics' second biggest rival, behind only the Los Angeles Lakers.

Both the 76ers and Celtics compete in the Atlantic Division of the Eastern Conference, meaning they play each other four times each season, with two meetings in Boston, and two meetings in Philadelphia.

== History ==
=== Celtics–Nationals rivalry ===
The Syracuse Nationals and Boston Celtics played in the Eastern Division in the 1950s. The Nationals beat the Celtics in three straight playoff series in 1954, 1955, and 1956, winning the NBA Championship in 1955. After the 1956 season the Celtics traded for Bill Russell and drafted K.C. Jones, both of whom starred and won Championships at the University of San Francisco. Also adding Tom Heinsohn with a territorial pick, the Celtics would win their next three playoff series against the Nationals in the playoffs (1957, 1959, and 1961) before the Nationals were sold and moved to Philadelphia.

=== Chamberlain and Russell ===
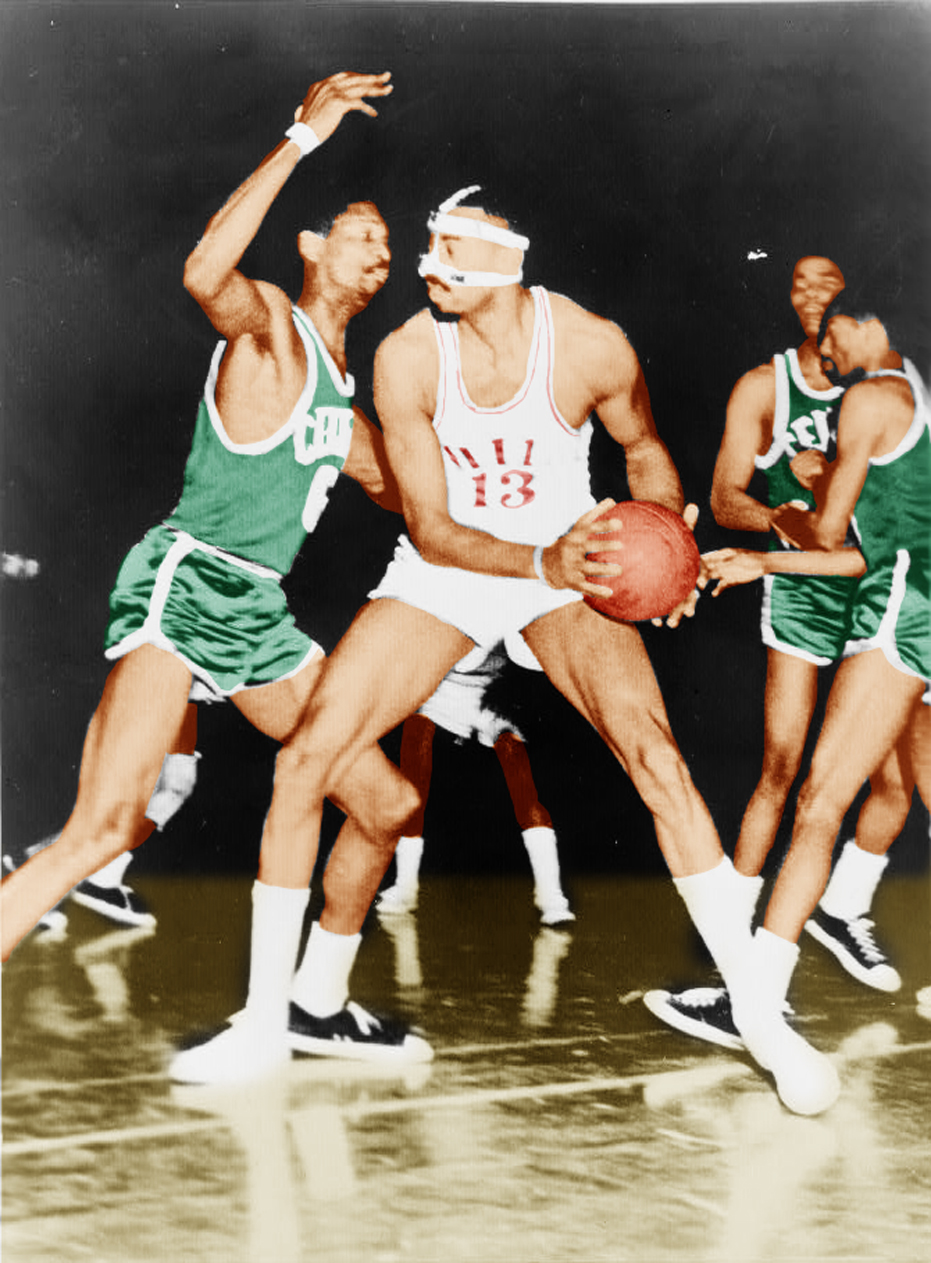
Wilt Chamberlain (#13 of the Philadelphia 76ers), being defended by Bill Russell (#6 of the Boston Celtics). Counting the playoffs, Russell played the 76ers 183 times, the most games by a player against a team in NBA history.

In 1963, the Syracuse Nationals moved to Philadelphia and became the 76ers (also known as the Sixers), renewing the basketball rivalry between Philadelphia and Boston (from when the Warriors had been in Philadelphia). Shortly after the All-Star break in 1965, the 76ers acquired Wilt Chamberlain from the Warriors, bringing the Chamberlain/Russell matchup back into the rivalry as well.

The Celtics and 76ers met in the Eastern Division Finals that season with a trip to the NBA Finals on the line. The series went the distance, with Game 7 being held at the Boston Garden. With 5 seconds left and Boston leading 110–109, Russell tried to inbound the ball when it hit a guide wire that supported the backboard, which resulted in a turnover. However, the 76ers failed to capitalize when Celtics forward John Havlicek deflected the inbound pass to Sam Jones, who ran out the clock. The Celtics advanced to the NBA Finals and defeated the Los Angeles Lakers in five games for their seventh straight title.

In the 1966 season, the 76ers looked poised to end Boston's 7-year reign as NBA Champions; Philadelphia won the regular season series against Boston 6–4 and finished 55–25 to beat out the Celtics by one game and win the number one seed in Eastern Division. Chamberlain also won the MVP over Russell, who had won three of the previous four awards. When they met in the Division Finals however, Boston defeated Philadelphia 4–1 and went on to win their eighth straight NBA championship.

The next year, the 76ers brought in Alex Hannum as head coach. Hannum had also coached the Bob Pettit-led St. Louis Hawks to the 1958 NBA championship-the last year someone had defeated the Celtics in the championship. The 76ers went a then-NBA record 68–13 while the Celtics were 60–21. In the Eastern Division Finals, the 76ers overpowered Boston, beating them in five games and ending Boston's eight-year reign as NBA champions. The 76ers won the NBA championship by beating the San Francisco Warriors in six games, giving the 76ers and Chamberlain their first title. The 1966–67 76ers were voted in 1980 as being the greatest team in the history of the NBA to that point.

In 1968, the 76ers finished 62–20, eight games above Boston, and Chamberlain won his third consecutive MVP award. Both teams met in the Division Finals again, and the Celtics won the series in seven games after trailing 3–1, and went on to win the 1968 NBA championship. After the season, 76ers head coach Alex Hannum left the NBA for the ABA in order to move closer to his family on the West Coast, and Chamberlain requested a trade, and was traded to Los Angeles.

Without Wilt, the 76ers managed a 55–27 record. Though Philadelphia again won the regular-season series against the Celtics, they were no match for Boston in the playoffs and lost 4–1. The Celtics went on to win the championship, their 11th in 13 seasons. After this season, Russell retired and both teams would not meet in the playoffs until 1977. The only two years Russell's Celtics did not win the championship, they lost to teams coached by Alex Hannum.

=== Dr. J and Bird ===
The 76ers slumped until acquiring Julius Erving before the 1977 season. They became a contender in the East, and in Erving's first season with the team, the 76ers eliminated the defending champion Boston Celtics in a tough seven-game Eastern semifinals in 1977. Boston slumped for the next two seasons while Philadelphia continued to be a strong team in the NBA, but in 1979, the Celtics drafted Indiana State forward Larry Bird in the hope of reviving their glory years as a franchise. Bird joined the team for the 1980 season and his impact was immediate. The Celtics improved from a 29–53 record in the 1978–79 season to a league-best 61–21 record in 1979–1980, advancing to the Eastern Conference Finals that season to face the 76ers. The 76ers beat Boston in 5 but failed to win the title against the Lakers.

The next season, both the Celtics and the 76ers finished with the best record in the NBA at 62–20, but Boston held the tiebreaker in the ranking. In a classic 7-game Eastern Finals, the Celtics beat the 76ers in 1981 4–3, coming all the way back from a 3–1 deficit to win the next 3 games in classic finishes. The Celtics won Games 5 and 6 by 2 points each and the seventh game by 1 point, 91–90, coming back from a 7-point deficit with a few minutes left to win on a Larry Bird banker from the left side with barely a minute left. The Celtics then defeated the Houston Rockets on their way to their first title in 5 years. For the 1981–1982 season, the Celtics again had the best record in the NBA at 63–19, followed by Philadelphia at 58–24, with one of the 76ers' key victories in the regular season being a win in Boston to snap the Celtics' 18-game winning streak. In the 1982 Eastern Finals, Boston opened the series with the "Mother's Day Massacre," a 121–81 blowout that remains the 76ers' worst playoff loss to date. Though Philadelphia surged to a 3–1 lead, Boston forced Game 7 at the Boston Garden by winning the next two. However, Philadelphia had the last laugh, winning Game 7. In that finale, as Boston fans saw their team losing, in a show of respect, they congratulated the 76ers by shouting the now-famous "Beat L.A." chant as the 76ers were about to face the well-rested Los Angeles Lakers. In the end, however, the weary 76ers couldn't keep up, losing to the Lakers in the Finals.

The next season, the 76ers picked up MVP Moses Malone from the Houston Rockets. Malone repeated as the MVP and led the 76ers to an NBA Championship in a 4-game sweep against the Lakers. With the Bucks sweeping Boston, it made the 76ers' title run much easier.

The "highlight" of this era of the rivalry was a 1983 exhibition game that featured 3 separate fights: Moses Malone/Cedric Maxwell, Larry Bird/Marc Iavaroni, and Gerald Henderson/Sedale Threatt. During Bird/Iavaroni, Bird ripped 76ers coach Billy Cunningham's sports jacket in half. The fight was reaching a peak when 66-year-old Red Auerbach came down from the stands to restore order. For his actions, Auerbach was fined US$2,500 (equivalent to $8,081 in 2025) by the NBA. There was also a memorable 1985 choking match between Bird and Erving.

Since 1984, the only times the two teams met in the playoffs were in 1985, 2002, 2012, 2018, 2020, 2023, and 2026. Though the 1983–84 season saw the Celtics win the title and the 76ers upset in the first round by the New Jersey Nets, the 76ers had a measure of satisfaction in the regular season by winning 4 of their 6 regular season games versus Boston, the only time the 76ers managed to win the regular season series versus Boston in the Larry Bird era. Charles Barkley joined the 76ers for the 1984–85 season, and the 1985 Eastern Final series was the 76ers' last conference final until 2001. In the 1985 Finals, they lost to Boston in five games after Boston had won the first 3 games, including a third game in Philadelphia where Julius Erving was uncharacteristically booed by the home crowd for his poor play. Game 5 saw Larry Bird pick off Andrew Toney with a few seconds left and Boston up by 2, then dribble up court to preserve the Celtics' close victory, reminiscent of John Havlicek's series-clinching steal in 1965.

=== Lull and rebuilding ===
After the 1985 playoffs, the rivalry would die down. Bird and the Celtics would win one more championship in 1986, but the 76ers would not reach another conference finals until 2001. The 76ers saw a steep decline through the rest of the '80's, trading Malone and Cheeks along with the retirements of Erving and Toney. Charles Barkley emerged as the 76ers new leader and a prominent NBA superstar, however he was not able to get the team past the second round. Though considered an MVP candidate in his prime, the 76ers traded him in 1992 and went through a period of rebuilding.

After winning the championship in 1986, the Celtics also began a decline that started with tragedy. Two days after they drafted him in the 1986 draft, Len Bias died of a drug overdose. Reggie Lewis died of a heart attack in his prime in 1993. The Celtics then missed the playoffs in 1994, and did not post a winning record until the 2001–02 season.

Despite the 90's being a period of stagnation for both teams, it did produce some key developments. Allen Iverson was drafted by the 76ers as the first overall pick in the 1996 draft, and the Celtics would draft Paul Pierce two years later. Both players would become superstars in the league and lead their respective team into the playoffs numerous times.

In 2002, the Celtics, in their first appearance since 1995, won the first round meeting 3–2 over the defending conference champion 76ers. That series featured the scoring exploits of Allen Iverson and Paul Pierce.

The two teams met again in the 2012 Eastern Conference Semifinals, which the Celtics won 4–3. The fourth-seeded Celtics defeated the eighth-seeded 76ers in a tight, back and forth series.

=== The Process vs. The Jays ===
Four days before the 2017 NBA draft, the Celtics traded the first overall pick (acquired from the Brooklyn Nets in the 2013 Paul Pierce–Kevin Garnett trade) to the 76ers for the third overall pick (acquired from the Sacramento Kings in the 2015 Nik Stauskas trade) and a future first-round pick that would eventually convey in 2019. The Celtics proceeded to draft Jayson Tatum as planned with the third pick, while the 76ers drafted Markelle Fultz first overall. Romeo Langford was drafted fourteenth overall with the 2019 pick.

The teams met again in the 2018 Eastern Conference Semifinals as both team advanced from the first round, led by Isaiah Thomas and the young core of Tatum and Jaylen Brown from Celtics with Ben Simmons and Joel Embiid from the 76ers, respectively. The Celtics won 4–1, and Joel Embiid afterwards remarked "This is not a rivalry, I don't know our record against them, but it's pretty bad. They always kick our ass."

The teams met again in the first round of the 2020 NBA playoffs and the Celtics swept the series 4–0. Due to the COVID-19 pandemic, the series was held in a neutral site with no spectators.

The teams met again in the 2023 Eastern Conference Semifinals and, despite the 76ers being up 3–2 going into game 6, the Celtics managed to come back and won 4–3. The series was highlighted by Jayson Tatum's 51 points in Game 7 of the series. His 51 points are the most in a Game 7 in NBA playoff history, surpassing the previous mark by Stephen Curry (50 points), who had already held the record two weeks earlier.

The Celtics won their 18th NBA championship the next season in 2024, with Jaylen Brown winning Finals MVP.

During the 2025–26 season, with Jayson Tatum out for most of the season due to an achilles tear, Jaylen Brown became the Celtics' best player and came in sixth in MVP voting. The Celtics and 76ers were later grouped in East Group B for the 2025 NBA Cup. The Celtics defeated the 76ers 109–108 in a group stage match that also counted toward the regular season standings. However, neither team would advance to the knockout stage. Later that season, the Celtics clinched the second seed and the 76ers advanced as the seventh seed following their play-in tournament win over the Orlando Magic in the first stage, matching them up in the 2026 Eastern Conference First Round. In the closing minutes of that play-in game, 76ers fans in Philadelphia notably chanted "We want Boston", a sentiment later mocked by Celtics fans during Boston's 123–91 blowout win at home in Game 1. The series featured Celtics center Nikola Vučević, who returned to the playoff rivalry after appearing in 2012 as a rookie for the 76ers. The Celtics held a 3–1 advantage after four games, but the 76ers came back and eliminated the Celtics in seven games. It marked the ninth time both teams reached a Game 7 in their playoff series, an NBA record for the most Game 7s played in any playoff rivalry. This also marked the Celtics' first series loss after leading 3–1 following 32 undefeated series and the 76ers' first successful comeback from a 1–3 deficit after 18 winless tries, including 5 playoff series losses to Boston. The 76ers became the 14th team in NBA history to overcome a 1–3 deficit. This marked the 76ers' first playoff series win over the Celtics since 1982 and their fifth since the franchise moved to Philadelphia in 1963.

=== Jaylen Brown and LeBron James to the 76ers ===
During the following 2026 offseason, the Celtics traded Jaylen Brown to the 76ers for Paul George and multiple first round draft picks. In a separate move, LeBron James signed with the 76ers for his 24th season, an all-time NBA record, and thus return to the Eastern Conference. Over his playoff career, James was eliminated by the Celtics in 2008 and 2010 while with the Cleveland Cavaliers before winning five straight series against them between 2011 and 2018 as a member of the Miami Heat and Cavaliers.

In their first regular-season meeting since the trade, the Celtics defeated the 76ers 123–101. Prior to tip-off, Jaylen Brown notably brushed off a friendly chest tap from former Celtics teammate Jayson Tatum. Paul George, in his return to Philadelphia, scored a game-high 36 points for the Celtics.

== The Boston Strangler ==
Boston sportswriters dubbed 76ers' shooting guard Andrew Toney "The Boston Strangler" because of his ability to take control of games against the Celtics. He is remembered for scoring 25 points against Boston in the fourth quarter on March 21, 1982, at the Philadelphia Spectrum. It is still the 76ers' team record for most points scored in a quarter. He also scored a team-high 33 points in the classic Game 7 of the 1982 Eastern Finals in Boston (the famous "Beat LA!" game), leading the 76ers to the Finals and avoiding a second straight meltdown in the Eastern Finals versus Boston. Andrew Toney's ability to have big scoring games in the playoffs versus the Celtics was one of the reasons for the Celtics in acquiring defensive ace and Hall of Famer Dennis Johnson from the Phoenix Suns prior to the 1983–84 season, and Johnson would go on to have several great seasons with the Celtics, winning two titles with them in 1984 and 1986.

== Season-by-season results ==
Syracuse Nationals/Philadelphia 76ers vs. Boston Celtics Season-by-Season Results
1949–1950s (Celtics 69–67)

Season	Season series		at Syracuse Nationals	at Boston Celtics	at Neutral Site	Overall series	Notes
1949–50	Nationals	2–0	Nationals, 1–0	Nationals, 1–0	—N/a	Nationals; 2–0	Basketball Association of America and National Basketball League merge to become the National Basketball Association (NBA), putting the Nationals and Celtics in the Eastern Division. Nationals win the Eastern Division for the first time. Nationals finish with the best record in the league (51–13). Nationals lose 1950 NBA Finals.
1950–51	Nationals	5–3	Nationals, 4–0	Celtics, 3–1	—N/a	Nationals; 7–3	Last season Nationals played at State Fair Coliseum.
1951–52	Nationals	5–4	Nationals, 4–1	Celtics, 3–1	—N/a	Nationals; 12–7	Nationals open up Onondaga War Memorial. Nationals win the Eastern Division.
1952–53	Nationals	6–5	Nationals, 5–0	Celtics, 4–0	Tie, 1–1	Nationals; 18–12	Neutral site games were played at: Convention Hall, Philadelphia, Pennsylvania; Madison Square Garden (III), New York City, New York
1953 Eastern Division Semifinals	Celtics	2–0	Celtics, 1–0	Celtics, 1–0	—N/a	Nationals; 18–14	1st postseason series.
1953–54	Tied	5–5	Nationals, 3–1	Celtics, 3–1	Tie, 1–1	Nationals; 23–19	Neutral site games were played at: Madison Square Garden (III); Baltimore Coliseum, Baltimore, Maryland
1954 Eastern Division Round-Robin	Nationals	2–0	Nationals, 1–0	Nationals, 1–0	—N/a	Nationals; 25–19	Only season in NBA history to use round-robin playoff format. Nationals (4–0) and Celtics (2–2) finish above the New York Knicks (0–4), setting up an Eastern Division Finals postseason series.
1954 Eastern Division Finals	Nationals	2–0	Nationals, 1–0	Nationals, 1–0	—N/a	Nationals; 27–19	2nd postseason series. Nationals go on to lose 1954 NBA Finals.
1954–55	Tied	6–6	Nationals, 5–0	Celtics, 5–0	Tie, 1–1	Nationals; 33–25	Both neutral site games were played at Madison Square Garden (III). Last season Celtics played at Boston Arena as secondary home arena. Nationals win the Eastern Division. Nationals finish tied for the best record in the league (43–29).
1955 Eastern Division Finals	Nationals	3–1	Nationals, 2–0	Tie, 1–1	—N/a	Nationals; 36–26	3rd postseason series. Nationals go on to win 1955 NBA Finals.
1955–56	Celtics	8–4	Nationals, 3–2	Celtics, 3–1	Celtics, 3–0	Nationals; 40–34	Neutral site games were played at: Madison Square Garden (III); Bangor Municipal Auditorium, Bangor, Maine; Convention Hall; Nationals and Celtics played the first regular-season NBA game in Maine at Bangor Auditorium.
1956 Eastern Division Semifinals	Nationals	2–1	Nationals, 1–0	Tie, 1–1	—N/a	Nationals; 42–35	4th postseason series.
1956–57	Nationals	7–5	Nationals, 4–1	Celtics, 3–2	Tie, 1–1	Nationals; 49–40	Neutral site games were played at: Convention Hall; Madison Square Garden (III); Bill Russell makes his debut for the Celtics. Celtics win the Eastern Division for the first time. Celtics finish with the best record in the league (44–28).
1957 Eastern Division Finals	Celtics	3–0	Celtics, 1–0	Celtics, 2–0	—N/a	Nationals; 49–43	5th postseason series. Celtics go on to win 1957 NBA Finals.
1957–58	Celtics	7–5	Nationals, 4–1	Celtics, 5–0	Tie, 1–1	Nationals; 54–50	Neutral site games were played at: Madison Square Garden (III); Convention Hall; Celtics win the Eastern Division. Celtics finish with the best record in the league (49–23). Celtics lose 1958 NBA Finals.
1958–59	Celtics	7–5	Nationals, 4–1	Celtics, 4–1	Celtics, 2–0	Nationals; 59–57	Neutral site games were played at: Convention Hall; Madison Square Garden (III); Celtics win the Eastern Division. Celtics finish with the best record in the league (52–20).
1959 Eastern Division Finals	Celtics	4–3	Nationals, 3–0	Celtics, 4–0	—N/a	Nationals; 62–61	6th postseason series. First postseason series in the rivalry to go to game 7. This is the last time the Syracuse Nationals (now the Philadelphia 76ers) held the overall series record over the Celtics. Celtics go on to win 1959 NBA Finals.
1959–60	Celtics	8–5	Tie, 3–3	Celtics, 5–0	Nationals, 2–0	Celtics; 69–67	Neutral site games were played at: Rhode Island Auditorium, Providence, Rhode Island; Convention Hall; On March 3, 1960, Nationals beat the Celtics 149–108, their largest victory over the Celtics as a Syracuse team with a 41-point differential and second largest victory overall against them. Celtics win the Eastern Division. Celtics finish with the best record in the league (59–16). Celtics win 1960 NBA Finals.

1960s (Celtics, 82–51)

Season	Season series		at Syracuse Nationals/Philadelphia 76ers	at Boston Celtics	at Neutral site	Overall series	Notes
1960–61	Celtics	10–3	Celtics, 3–2	Celtics, 4–1	Celtics, 2–0	Celtics; 79–70	Neutral site games were played at: Rhode Island Auditorium; Convention Hall; Celtics win the Eastern Division. Celtics finish with the best record in the league (57–22).
1961 Eastern Division Finals	Celtics	4–1	Tie, 1–1	Celtics, 3–0		Celtics; 83–71	7th postseason series. Last postseason series Celtics faced the Nationals as a Syracuse team. Celtics go on to win 1961 NBA Finals.
1961–62	Celtics	10–2	Celtics, 4–1	Celtics, 5–0	Tie, 1–1	Celtics; 93–73	Neutral site games were played at: Rochester Community War Memorial, Rochester, New York; Rhode Island Auditorium; Celtics win the Eastern Division. Celtics finish with the best record in the league (60–20). Celtics win 1962 NBA Finals.
1962–63	Tied	6–6	Nationals, 4–1	Celtics, 4–1	Tie, 1–1	Celtics; 99–79	Neutral site games were played at: Convention Hall; Rhode Island Auditorium; Last season where the Syracuse Nationals played as a Syracuse team. On January 19, 1963, Nationals beat the Celtics 149–148, their most points scored against the Celtics as a Syracuse team. It also was the most points the Celtics scored against the Nationals/76ers in a game overall. Celtics win the Eastern Division. Celtics finish with the best record in the league (58–22). Celtics win 1963 NBA Finals.
1963–64	Celtics	10–2	Celtics, 3–2	Celtics, 4–0	Celtics, 3–0	Celtics; 109–81	Neutral site games were played at: Rhode Island Auditorium; Pittsburgh Civic Arena, Pittsburgh, Pennsylvania; Onondaga War Memorial, Syracuse, New York; Syracuse Nationals relocate to Philadelphia and are renamed to the Philadelphia 76ers. Celtics record their 100th win over the 76ers. Celtics win the Eastern Division. Celtics finish with the best record in the league (59–21). Celtics win 1964 NBA Finals.
1964–65	Tied	5–5	Tie, 2–2	Celtics, 3–0	76ers, 3–0	Celtics; 114–86	Neutral site games were played at: Madison Square Garden (III); Rhode Island Auditorium; Onondaga War Memorial; 76ers acquire Wilt Chamberlain after the All-Star weekend. Celtics win the Eastern Division. Celtics finish with the best record in the league (62–18).
1965 Eastern Division Finals	Celtics	4–3	76ers, 3–0	Celtics, 4–0		Celtics; 118–89	8th postseason series. First postseason series as the Philadelphia 76ers. Celtics go on to win 1965 NBA Finals.
1965–66	76ers	6–4	76ers, 4–0	Celtics, 3–2	Celtics, 1–0	Celtics; 122–95	Neutral site game was played at Onondaga War Memorial. 76ers win the Eastern Division for the first time as a Philadelphia team, snapping the Celtic's nine consecutives divisional titles. 76ers finish with the best record in the league (55–25).
1966 Eastern Division Finals	Celtics	4–1	Celtics, 2–1	Celtics, 2–0		Celtics; 126–96	9th postseason series. Celtics go on to win 1966 NBA Finals.
1966–67	Celtics	5–4	Tie, 2–2	Celtics, 3–2		Celtics; 131–100	On October 29, 1966, 76ers beat the Celtics 138–96, their largest victory overall against the Celtics with a 42-point differential. 76ers record their 100th win over the Celtics. Last season 76ers played at Municipal Auditorium. 76ers win the Eastern Division. 76ers finish with the best record in the league (68–13).
1967 Eastern Division Finals	76ers	4–1	76ers, 3–0	Tie, 1–1		Celtics; 132–104	10th postseason series. First NBA playoff series to reach 10 occurrences. First time 76ers win a postseason series against the Celtics as a Philadelphia team. With the victory, 76ers snap Celtics' record-breaking eight consecutive NBA titles and ten consecutive NBA Finals appearances. 76ers go on to win 1967 NBA Finals.
1967–68	Tied	4–4	76ers, 3–1	Celtics, 3–1		Celtics; 136–108	76ers open up The Spectrum. 76ers win the Eastern Division. 76ers finish with the best record in the league (62–20). Last season Wilt Chamberlain played for the 76ers.
1968 Eastern Division Finals	Celtics	4–3	Celtics, 3–1	76ers, 2–1		Celtics; 140–111	11th postseason series. First time road team has the better record in a postseason series. Celtics go on to win 1968 NBA Finals. Last postseason series Wilt Chamberlain played as a 76ers.
1968–69	Celtics	5–2	Celtics, 3–1	Celtics, 2–1		Celtics; 145–113	76ers trade Wilt Chamberlain to the Los Angeles Lakers. Final season for Bill Russell.
1969 Eastern Division Semifinals	Celtics	4–1	Celtics, 3–0	Tie, 2–2		Celtics; 149–114	12th postseason series. 76ers and Celtics meet in the playoffs five consecutive times. Celtics go on to win 1969 NBA Finals. Bill Russell retires the following season.
1969–70	76ers	4–2	76ers, 2–1	76ers, 2–1		Celtics; 151–118	On March 6, 1970, 76ers beat the Celtics 150–134, their most points scored against the Celtics in a game. 76ers finish with a winning record in Boston in the regular season for the first time since the 1949 season and the first time as a Philadelphia team. 76ers or Celtics did not reach the NBA Finals for the first time since the 1956 Finals.

1970s (Celtics, 42–25)

Season	Season series		at Philadelphia 76ers	at Boston Celtics	at Neutral site	Overall series	Notes
1970–71	Celtics	4–2	Celtics, 2–1	Celtics, 2–1		Celtics; 155–120	76ers and Celtics are placed in the new Eastern Conference and the Atlantic Division.
1971–72	Celtics	6–0	Celtics, 2–0	Celtics, 3–0	Celtics, 1–0	Celtics; 161–120	Neutral site game was played at Hersheypark Arena, Hershey, Pennsylvania. Celtics sweep the 76ers for the first time. Celtics win the Atlantic Division for the first time.
1972–73	Celtics	7–0	Celtics, 3–0	Celtics, 3–0	Celtics, 1–0	Celtics; 168–120	Neutral site game was played at Providence Civic Center, Providence, Rhode Island. Celtics win the Atlantic Division. Celtics finish with the best record in the league (68–14).
1973–74	Celtics	7–1	Celtics, 2–1	Celtics, 3–0	Celtics, 2–0	Celtics; 175–121	Neutral site games were played at: Providence Civic Center; Hersheypark Arena; Last season the rivalry is played at a neutral site. On March 16, 1974, Celtics beat the 76ers 146–127, setting a record for most points scored against the 76ers that resulted in a win. Celtics win 20 games in a row against the 76ers. Celtics win the Atlantic Division. Celtics win 1974 NBA Finals.
1974–75	Celtics	5–3	Celtics, 3–1	Tie, 2–2		Celtics; 180–124	Celtics win the Atlantic Division. Celtics finish with the best record in the league (60–22).
1975–76	Celtics	4–3	Tie, 2–2	Celtics, 2–1		Celtics; 184–127	Celtics win the Atlantic Division. Celtics win 1976 NBA Finals.
1976–77	76ers	3–1	76ers, 2–0	Tie, 1–1		Celtics; 185–130	76ers acquire Julius Erving from the New York Nets. 76ers win the Atlantic Division for the first time.
1977 Eastern Conference Semifinals	76ers	4–3	76ers, 3–1	Celtics, 2–1		Celtics; 188–134	13th postseason series. 76ers go on to lose 1977 NBA Finals.
1977–78	76ers	4–0	76ers, 2–0	76ers, 2–0		Celtics; 188–138	76ers sweep Celtics for the first time in a season. 76ers win the Atlantic Division.
1978–79	Tied	2–2	Tie, 1–1	Tie, 1–1		Celtics; 190–140	First time in the rivalry both teams split the series in both locations.
1979–80	Tied	3–3	76ers, 3–0	Celtics, 3–0		Celtics; 193–143	Larry Bird makes his debut for the Celtics. Celtics win the Atlantic Division. Celtics finish with the best record in the league (61–21).

1980s (Celtics, 44–39)

Season	Season series		at Philadelphia 76ers	at Boston Celtics	Overall series	Notes
1980 Eastern Conference Finals	76ers	4–1	76ers, 2–0	76ers, 2–1	Celtics; 194–147	14th postseason series. 76ers go on to lose 1980 NBA Finals.
1980–81	Tied	3–3	76ers, 3–0	Celtics, 3–0	Celtics, 197–150	Celtics win the Atlantic Division. Celtics finish with the best record in the league (62–20).
1981 Eastern Conference Finals	Celtics	4–3	76ers, 2–1	Celtics, 3–1	Celtics; 201–153	15th postseason series. Celtics record their 200th win over the 76ers. Celtics go on to win 1981 NBA Finals.
1981–82	Celtics	4–2	Celtics, 2–1	Celtics, 2–1	Celtics; 205–155	Celtics win the Atlantic Division. Celtics finish with the best record in the league (63–19).
1982 Eastern Conference Finals	76ers	4–3	76ers, 2–1	Tie, 2–2	Celtics; 208–159	16th postseason series. 76ers and Celtics meet in three consecutive Eastern Conference Finals. 76ers go on to lose 1982 NBA Finals.
1982–83	Tied	3–3	76ers, 3–0	Celtics, 3–0	Celtics; 211–162	76ers win the Atlantic Division. 76ers finish with the best record in the league (65–17). 76ers win 1983 NBA Finals.
1983–84	76ers	4–2	76ers, 2–1	76ers, 2–1	Celtics; 213–166	Celtics win the Atlantic Division. Celtics finish with the best record in the league (62–20). Celtics win 1984 NBA Finals.
1984–85	Tied	3–3	76ers, 3–0	Celtics, 3–0	Celtics; 216–169	Celtics win the Atlantic Division. Celtics finish with the best record in the league (63–19).
1985 Eastern Conference Finals	Celtics	4–1	Tie, 1–1	Celtics, 3–0	Celtics; 220–170	17th postseason series. 76ers and Celtics meet in the Eastern Conference Finals four times in six years. Celtics go on to lose 1985 NBA Finals, their first NBA Finals loss since 1958
1985–86	Celtics	4–2	76ers, 2–1	Celtics, 3–0	Celtics; 224–172	Celtics win the Atlantic Division. Celtics finish with the best record in the league (67–15). Celtics win 1986 NBA Finals.
1986–87	Tied	3–3	76ers, 3–0	Celtics, 3–0	Celtics; 227–175	Celtics win the Atlantic Division. Celtics lose 1987 NBA Finals. Last season for Julius Erving.
1987–88	Celtics	4–2	Celtics, 2–1	Celtics, 2–1	Celtics; 231–177	Celtics win the Atlantic Division.
1988–89	Tied	3–3	76ers, 3–0	Celtics, 3–0	Celtics; 234–180	
1989–90	Celtics	3–2	Tie, 1–1	Celtics, 2–1	Celtics; 237–182	76ers win the Atlantic Division.

1990s (Celtics, 26–16)

Season	Season series		at Philadelphia 76ers	at Boston Celtics	Overall series	Notes
1990–91	76ers	3–2	76ers, 3–0	Celtics, 2–0	Celtics; 239–185	Celtics win the Atlantic Division.
1991–92	Celtics	3–1	Tie, 1–1	Celtics, 2–0	Celtics; 242–186	Celtics win the Atlantic Division. Final season for Larry Bird.
1992–93	Celtics	4–1	Celtics, 2–0	Celtics, 2–1	Celtics; 246–187	
1993–94	Celtics	4–1	Celtics, 2–1	Celtics, 2–0	Celtics; 250–188	
1994–95	Celtics	3–1	Celtics, 2–0	Tie, 1–1	Celtics; 253–189	Last season Celtics played at Boston Garden.
1995–96	Celtics	4–0	Celtics, 2–0	Celtics, 2–0	Celtics; 257–189	Celtics open up Fleet Center (now known as TD Garden). Celtics sweep the 76ers for the first time since the 1972 season. Last season 76ers played at CoreStates Spectrum (previously known as The Spectrum).
1996–97	76ers	3–1	Tie, 1–1	76ers, 2–0	Celtics; 258–192	76ers open up CoreStates Center (now known as Wells Fargo Center). 76ers finish with the better record in Boston for the first time since the 1983 season.
1997–98	Celtics	3–1	Tie, 1–1	Celtics, 2–0	Celtics; 261–193	
1998–99	76ers	2–1	76ers, 1–0	Tie, 1–1	Celtics; 262–195	Fewest number of games played (3) in a season since the 1949 season.
1999–2000	76ers	3–1	76ers, 2–0	Tie, 1–1	Celtics; 263–198	To date, first and only time 76ers and Celtics have finished a full decade without a playoff series.

2000s (Celtics, 24–21)

Season	Season series		at Philadelphia 76ers	at Boston Celtics	Overall series	Notes
2000–01	76ers	4–0	76ers, 2–0	76ers, 2–0	Celtics; 263–202	76ers record their 200th win over the Celtics. 76ers sweep the Celtics for the first time since the 1977 season. 76ers win the Atlantic Division. 76ers lose 2001 NBA Finals.
2001–02	76ers	3–1	Tie, 1–1	76ers, 2–0	Celtics; 264–205	76ers win 8 games in a row against the Celtics, their longest winning streak against them.
2002 Eastern Conference First Round	Celtics	3–2	76ers, 2–0	Celtics, 3–0	Celtics; 267–207	18th postseason series. First time both teams meet in the Eastern Conference First Round.
2002–03	Tied	2–2	Tie, 1–1	Tie, 1–1	Celtics; 269–209	
2003–04	Celtics	3–1	Tie, 1–1	Celtics, 2–0	Celtics; 272–210	
2004–05	76ers	3–1	Tie, 1–1	76ers, 2–0	Celtics; 273–213	Celtics win the Atlantic Division.
2005–06	Celtics	3–1	Tie, 1–1	Celtics, 2–0	Celtics; 276–214	
2006–07	76ers	3–1	Tie, 1–1	76ers, 2–0	Celtics; 277–217	
2007–08	Celtics	3–1	Celtics, 2–0	Tie, 1–1	Celtics; 280–218	Celtics win the Atlantic Division. Celtics finish with the best record in the league (66–16). Celtics win 2008 NBA Finals.
2008–09	Celtics	4–0	Celtics, 2–0	Celtics, 2–0	Celtics; 284–218	Celtics win the Atlantic Division.
2009–10	Celtics	3–1	Celtics, 2–0	Tie, 1–1	Celtics; 287–219	Celtics win the Atlantic Division. Celtics lose 2010 NBA Finals.

2010s (Celtics, 33–18)

Season	Season series		at Philadelphia 76ers	at Boston Celtics	Overall series	Notes
2010–11	Celtics	3–1	Tie, 1–1	Celtics, 2–0	Celtics; 290–220	Celtics win the Atlantic Division.
2011–12	76ers	2–1	76ers, 2–0	Celtics, 1–0	Celtics; 291–222	Celtics win the Atlantic Division.
2012 Eastern Conference Semifinals	Celtics	4–3	76ers, 2–1	Celtics, 3–1	Celtics; 295–225	19th postseason series. First time both teams meet in the Eastern Conference Semifinals since the 1977 NBA playoffs.
2012–13	Tied	2–2	Tie, 1–1	Tie, 1–1	Celtics; 297–227	
2013–14	76ers	3–1	Tie, 1–1	76ers, 2–0	Celtics; 298–230	
2014–15	Celtics	4–0	Celtics, 2–0	Celtics, 2–0	Celtics; 302–230	Celtics record their 300th win over the 76ers.
2015–16	Celtics	4–0	Celtics, 2–0	Celtics, 2–0	Celtics; 306–230	
2016–17	Celtics	3–1	Tie, 1–1	Celtics, 2–0	Celtics; 309–231	First season with Jaylen Brown as a Celtic, as well as the first active season for Joel Embiid. Celtics win 11 games in a row against the 76ers. Celtics win the Atlantic Division.
2017–18	Celtics	3–1	Celtics, 2–0	Tie, 1–1	Celtics; 312–232	First season with Jayson Tatum. On January 11, 2018, Celtics beat the 76ers 114–103 at The O2 Arena in London, United Kingdom. The game is accounted as a 76ers home game.
2018 Eastern Conference Semifinals	Celtics	4–1	Tie, 1–1	Celtics, 3–0	Celtics; 316–233	20th postseason series. First NBA playoff series to reach 20 occurrences.
2018–19	Celtics	3–1	Tie, 1–1	Celtics, 2–0	Celtics; 319–234	
2019–20	76ers	3–1	76ers, 2–0	Tie, 1–1	Celtics; 320–237	

2020s (Celtics, 23–16)

Season	Season series		at Philadelphia 76ers	at Boston Celtics	Overall series	Notes
2020 Eastern Conference First Round	Celtics	4–0	Celtics, 2–0	Celtics, 2–0	Celtics; 324–237	21st postseason series. Celtics sweep 76ers for the first time since the 1957 playoffs. 76ers fire Brett Brown following the sweep.
2020–21	76ers	3–0	76ers, 2–0	76ers, 1–0	Celtics; 324–240	76ers sweep Celtics for the first time since the 2000 season. 76ers win the Atlantic Division.
2021–22	Tied	2–2	Tie, 1–1	Tie, 1–1	Celtics; 326–242	On February 15, 2022, Celtics beat the 76ers 135–87, their largest victory against the 76ers with a 48-point differential. Celtics win the Atlantic Division. Celtics lose 2022 NBA Finals.
2022–23	Celtics	3–1	Tie, 1–1	Celtics, 2–0	Celtics; 329–243	Celtics win the Atlantic Division.
2023 Eastern Conference Semifinals	Celtics	4–3	Celtics, 2–1	Tie, 2–2	Celtics; 333–246	22nd postseason series. 76ers fire Doc Rivers after the playoff loss.
2023–24	Celtics	3–1	Tie, 1–1	Celtics, 2–0	Celtics; 336–247	Celtics win their first Maurice Podoloff Trophy (64–18). Celtics win the Atlantic Division. Celtics win 2024 NBA Finals.
2024–25	Celtics	3–1	Celtics, 2–0	Tie, 1–1	Celtics 339–248	Celtics win the Atlantic Division.
2025–26	Tied	2–2	Tie, 1–1	Tie, 1–1	Celtics 341–250	On October 31, 2025, at Philadelphia, the Celtics beat the 76ers 109–108 during the 2025 NBA Cup group stage. Celtics win the Atlantic Division.
2026 Eastern Conference First Round	76ers	4–3	Celtics, 2–1	76ers, 3–1	Celtics; 344–254	23rd postseason series. 76ers come back from a 3–1 deficit and win a playoff series against the Celtics for the first time since 1982. Jaylen Brown's final playoff series as a Celtic.
2026–27	Celtics	1–0	Celtics, 1-0	January 21st and March 7th, 2027	Celtics; 345–254	First season with LeBron James in the rivalry, as well as Jaylen Brown's first season as a 76er.

Summary of Results

Season	Season series		at Syracuse Nationals/Philadelphia 76ers	at Boston Celtics	at Neutral site	Notes
Regular season games	Celtics	Celtics, 275–200	76ers, 131–95	Celtics, 158–57	Celtics, 22–12	
Postseason games	Celtics	69–54	76ers, 34–23	Celtics, 46–20	—N/a	Includes the 1954 Eastern Division Round Robin in which the Nationals won both games against the Celtics.
Postseason series	Celtics	15–9	Celtics, 4–2	Celtics, 11–7	—N/a	Eastern Division Semifinals: 1953, 1956, 1969; Eastern Division Finals: 1954, 1955, 1957, 1959, 1961, 1965, 1966, 1967, 1968; Eastern Conference First Round: 2002, 2020, 2026; Eastern Conference Semifinals: 1977, 2012, 2018, 2023; Eastern Conference Finals: 1980, 1981, 1982, 1985
Regular and postseason	Celtics	345–254	76ers, 165–118	Celtics, 205–78	Celtics, 22–12	There were 34 total neutral site games played.: 9 games at Madison Square Garden (III); 8 games at Convention Hall; 6 games at Rhode Island Auditorium; 3 games at Onodaga War Memorial; 2 games at Hersheypark Arena and Providence Civic Center; 1 game at Baltimore Coliseum, Bangor Municipal Auditorium, Rochester Community War Memorial and Pittsburgh Civic Arena.

== Individual Records ==
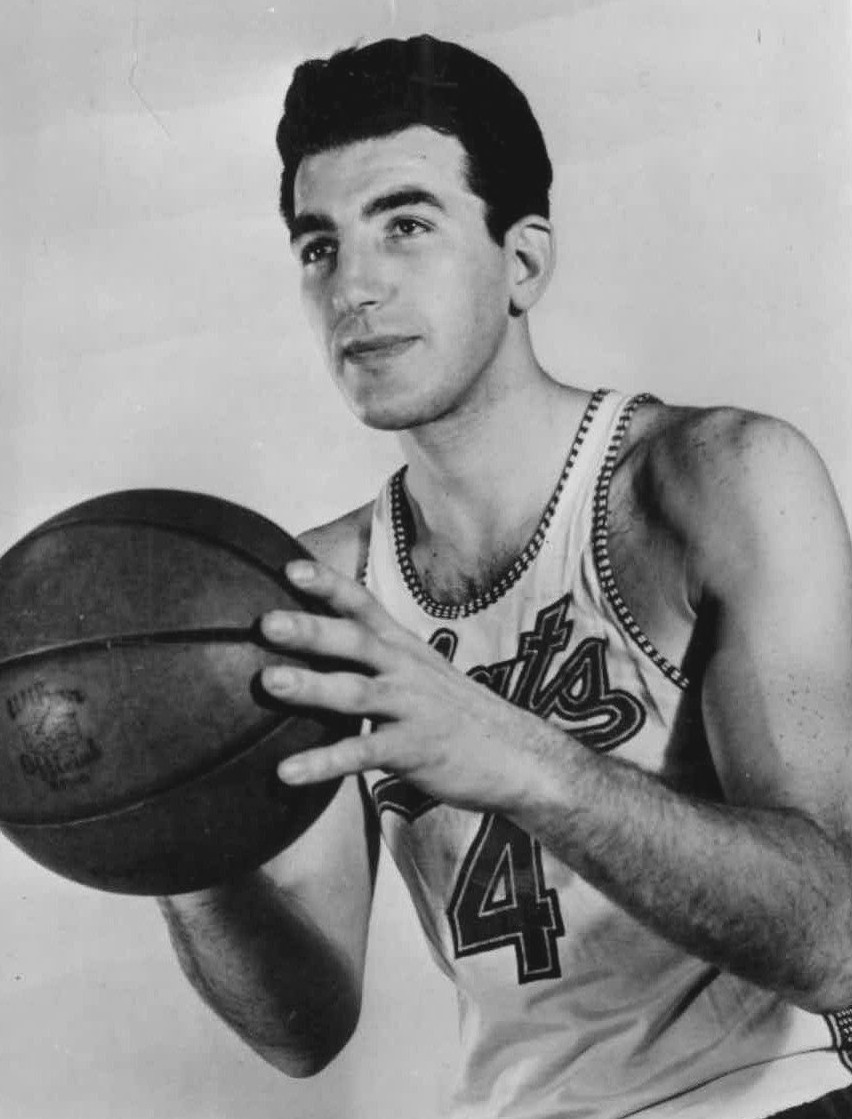
Dolph Schayes scored the most points in this rivalry. His 152 games against Boston are the most by a single player against a single team in the regular season.

Note: all records complete thru the 2025–26 NBA season

=== Top Scorers (Regular Season) ===
Rank	Player	Team	Points	GP	PPG
1	Dolph Schayes	Nationals/76ers	2,972	152	19.6
2	John Havlicek	Celtics	2,524	123	20.5
3	Bob Cousy	Celtics	2,406	135	17.8
4	Hal Greer	Nationals/76ers	2,369	133	17.8
5	Bill Russell	Celtics	2,139	139	15.4
6	Sam Jones	Celtics	2,124	120	17.7
7	Bill Sharman	Celtics	1,878	102	18.4
8	Tom Heinsohn	Celtics	1,825	99	18.4
9	Johnny Kerr	Nationals/76ers	1,608	132	12.2
10	Larry Bird	Celtics	1,428	61	23.4

=== Per Game (Regular Season, min. 20 GP) ===
1. Allen Iverson (PHI) – 26.5 (34 GP)
2. Joel Embiid (PHI) – 26.0 (28 GP)
3. Larry Bird (BOS) – 23.4 (61 GP)
4. Charles Barkley (PHI) – 23.0 (41 GP)
5. Wilt Chamberlain (PHI) – 22.6 (31 GP)
6. Julius Erving (PHI) – 22.0 (57 GP)
7. Paul Pierce (BOS) – 21.7 (55 GP)

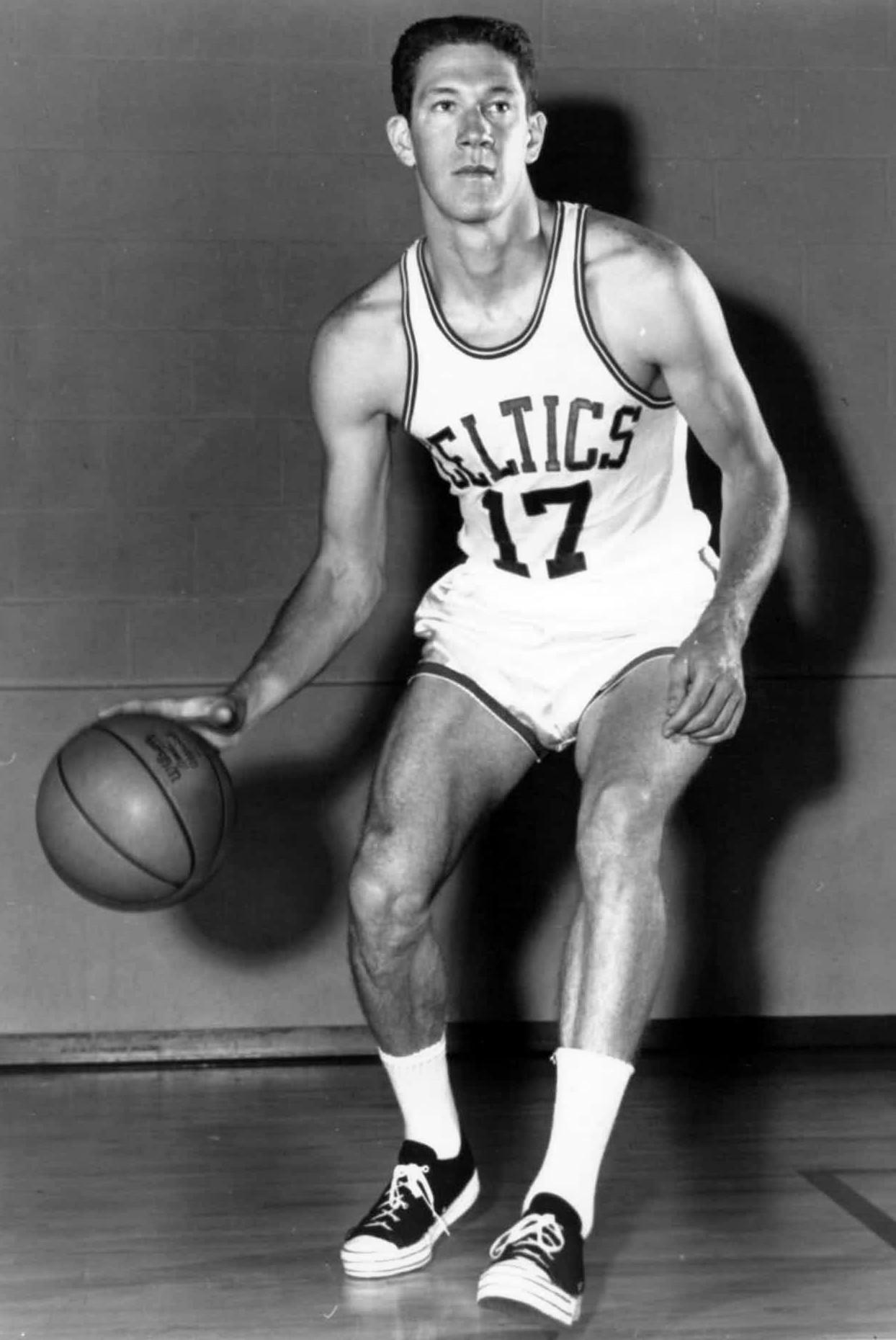
John Havlicek scored the most points in the playoffs in this rivalry.

=== Top Scorers (NBA Playoffs) ===
Rank	Player	Team	Points	GP	PPG
1	John Havlicek	Celtics	863	36	24.0
2	Sam Jones	Celtics	832	41	20.3
3	Hal Greer	Nationals/76ers	770	41	18.8
4	Bill Russell	Celtics	648	44	14.7
5	Julius Erving	76ers	633	31	20.4
6	Dolph Schayes	Nationals/76ers	627	28	22.4
7	Wilt Chamberlain	76ers	614	24	25.6
8	Bob Cousy	Celtics	577	28	20.6
9	Jayson Tatum	Celtics	569	22	25.9
10	Larry Bird	Celtics	530	24	22.1

=== Per Game (Playoffs) ===
1. Allen Iverson (PHI) – 30.0 (5 GP)
2. Joel Embiid (PHI) – 26.3 (19 GP)
3. Jayson Tatum (BOS) – 25.9 (22 GP)
4. George Yardley (SYR) – 25.7 (5 GP)
5. Wilt Chamberlain (PHI) – 25.6 (24 GP)

== See also ==
- National Basketball Association rivalries
- Havlicek stole the ball
