= Robert McEwen =

Robert McEwen may refer to:

- Bob McEwen (Robert D. McEwen, born 1950), U.S. Representative from Ohio (1981–1993)
- Robert C. McEwen (1920–1997), U.S. Representative from New York (1965–1981)
- Robbie McEwen (born 1972), Australian-Belgian bicyclist
- Rob McEwen (born 1950), Canadian businessman
- Rob McEwen (footballer) (1926–1993), Australian rules footballer

== See also ==
- Robert McEwan (disambiguation)
