= Allan Buchanan =

Allan Buchanan may refer to:

- Allan Buchanan (footballer), Australian rules footballer
- Allan Buchanan (rugby union), Irish rugby union player

== See also ==
- Alan Buchanan (disambiguation)
