= NBA 35th Anniversary Team =

The NBA 35th Anniversary Team were chosen on October 30, 1980, to honor the 35th anniversary of the founding of the National Basketball Association (NBA) as the Basketball Association of America (BAA) in 1946. It was the second anniversary team in the NBA. Unlike its predecessor, the NBA 25th Anniversary Team, that followed the concept of an All-NBA Team, this team was more like an NBA All-Star team that contains the eleven best players in the NBA's 35 years existence regardless of their position, and also had a coach. In addition, this team did not require a player to have completed his career to be eligible for this Team.

== NBA 35th Anniversary Team members ==
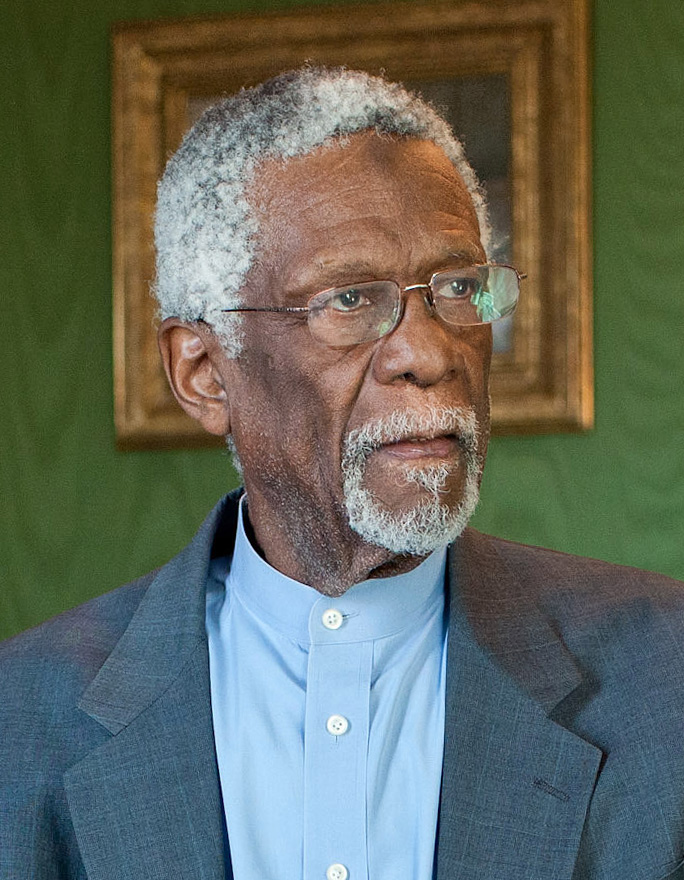
Bill Russell, voted the greatest player of the NBA's first 35 years

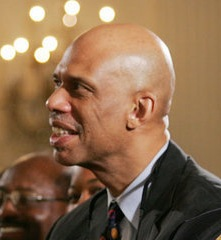
Kareem Abdul-Jabbar

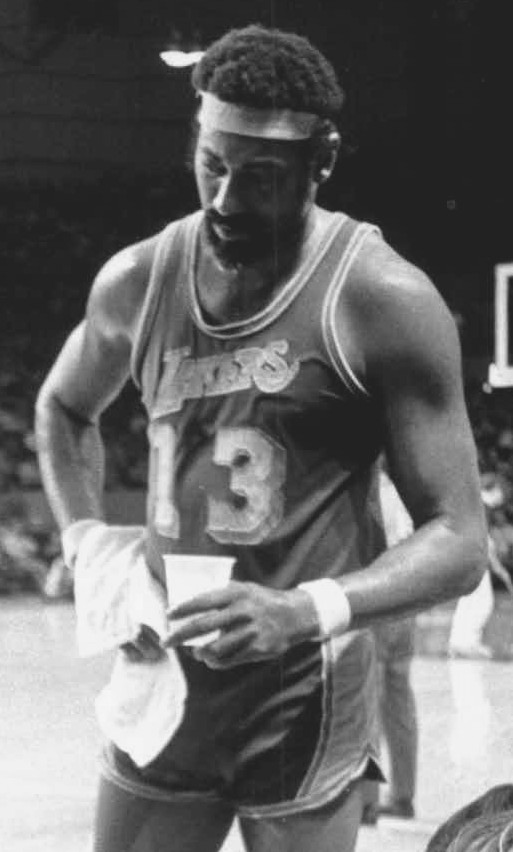
Wilt Chamberlain

Sorted by last name; players in italics were still active in 1980.

Position	Name
C	Kareem Abdul-Jabbar
F	Elgin Baylor
C	Wilt Chamberlain
G	Bob Cousy
F	Julius Erving
G/F	John Havlicek
C	George Mikan
F	Bob Pettit
G	Oscar Robertson
C	Bill Russell
G	Jerry West

- Red Auerbach (former coach of Washington Capitols, Tri-Cities Blackhawks, and Boston Celtics) was selected as NBA 35th Anniversary Team's coach.
- The 1966-67 Philadelphia 76ers selected as the greatest individual team.
- Bill Russell was selected as the greatest player.

All players on this team have been inducted into the Naismith Memorial Basketball Hall of Fame as players, and Red Auerbach has been inducted as a coach. Two team members were later inducted into the Hall in other roles. Russell was inducted as a coach, and West was inducted two more times, first as part of the 1960 U.S. Olympic team that was inducted as a unit and then as a contributor for his career as an NBA team executive. Cousy, Mikan, Pettit, and Russell had been previously selected into the NBA 25th Anniversary Team in 1971. All players on this team were included among the 50 Greatest Players in NBA History from 1996 and the NBA 75th Anniversary Team in 2021.

Only made up of 11 players, this team excludes 25th Anniversary Team players Paul Arizin, Bob Davies, Joe Fulks, Sam Jones, Dolph Schayes, and Bill Sharman.

== Selection process ==
The list was made through voting compiled by the Pro Basketball Writers Association.
