= Alan Buchanan =

Alan Buchanan may refer to:

- Alan Buchanan (politician) (born 1952), Canadian university administrator and politician
- Alan Buchanan (bishop) (1907–1984), Anglican bishop
- Alan Buchanan (naval architect) (1922–2015), British naval architect and yachtsman

== See also ==
- Allan Buchanan (disambiguation)
