= Robert McEwan (disambiguation) =

Robert McEwan may refer to:

- Bob McEwan (1881-1957), Scottish footballer
- Robert McEwan, Honorary Organiser for of The Boys' Brigade Australia

== See also ==
- Robert McEwen
