= John Havlicek =

American basketball player (1940–2019)

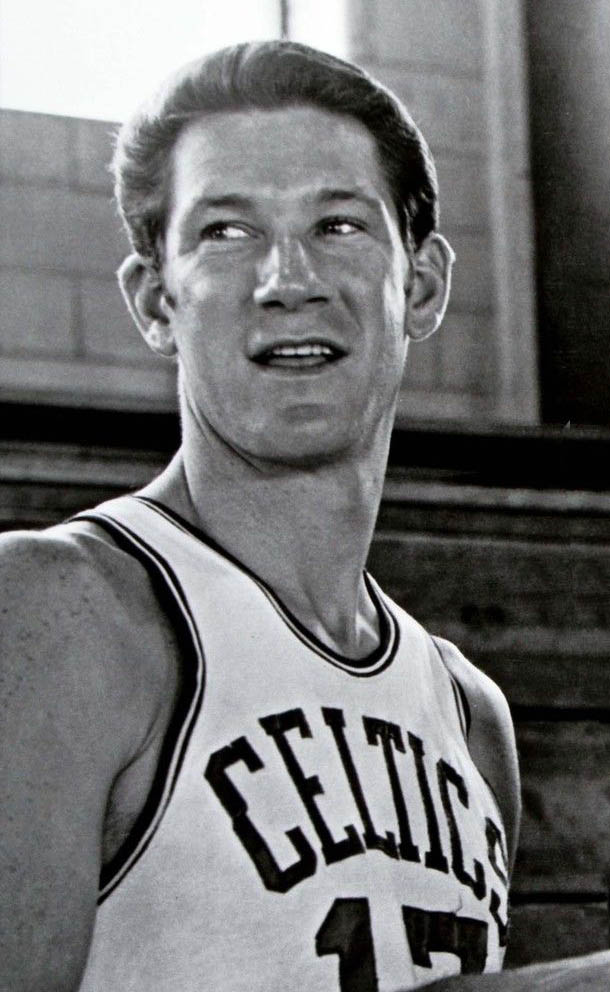
- Havlicek in the 1960s

Personal information
- Born: April 8, 1940 Martins Ferry, Ohio, US
- Died: April 25, 2019 (aged 79) Jupiter, Florida, US
- Listed height: 6 ft 5 in (1.96 m)
- Listed weight: 203 lb (92 kg)

Career information
- High school: Bridgeport (Bridgeport, Ohio)
- College: Ohio State (1959–1962)
- NBA draft: 1962: 1st round, 7th overall pick
- Drafted by: Boston Celtics
- Playing career: 1962–1978
- Position: Small forward / shooting guard
- Number: 17

Career history
- 1962–1978: Boston Celtics

Career highlights
- 8× NBA champion (1963–1966, 1968, 1969, 1974, 1976); NBA Finals MVP (1974); 13× NBA All-Star (1966–1978); 4× All-NBA First Team (1971–1974); 7× All-NBA Second Team (1964, 1966, 1968–1970, 1975, 1976); 5× NBA All-Defensive First Team (1972–1976); 3× NBA All-Defensive Second Team (1969–1971); NBA All-Rookie First Team (1963); NBA anniversary team (35th, 50th, 75th); No. 17 retired by Boston Celtics; NCAA champion (1960); Consensus second-team All-American (1962); Third-team All-American – AP (1961); 2× First-team All-Big Ten (1961, 1962); No. 5 retired by Ohio State Buckeyes

Career statistics
- Points: 26,395 (20.8 ppg)
- Rebounds: 8,007 (6.3 rpg)
- Assists: 6,114 (4.8 apg)
- Stats at NBA.com
- Stats at Basketball Reference
- Basketball Hall of Fame
- Collegiate Basketball Hall of Fame

John Joseph Havlicek (/ˈhævlɪtʃɛk/ HAV-lih-chek; April 8, 1940 – April 25, 2019), often nicknamed Hondo, was an American professional basketball player who spent his entire 16-year career with the Boston Celtics of the National Basketball Association (NBA). Havlicek won eight NBA championships — one of three NBA players with an unsurpassed 8–0 record in the NBA Finals series — and was voted the NBA Finals MVP in 1974.

A swingman, Havlicek played college basketball for the Ohio State Buckeyes from 1959 to 1962, winning an NCAA championship in 1960. He was selected by the Celtics in the 1962 NBA draft and played with the team until his retirement in 1978. A 13-time NBA All-Star, Havlicek was named to the All-NBA First Team four times and to the All-NBA Second Team seven times. He was also named to the NBA All-Defensive First Team on five occasions and to the NBA All-Defensive Second Team three times. Havlicek is known for his stamina and his hustle as well as his abilities.

During his career with the Celtics, he became known for stealing the ball to save the game–and the Celtics' playoff hopes–near the end of game seven in the 1965 Eastern Conference Finals. Havlicek served as captain of the Celtics from 1969 to 1978, and was named NBA Finals MVP in 1974. Following his retirement, his number 17 jersey was retired by the Celtics. Havlicek was inducted into Naismith Memorial Basketball Hall of Fame in 1984.

== Early life ==
Havlicek was born in Martins Ferry, Ohio, where his parents ran a general store. He was of Czech and Croatian descent, from his father and mother respectively.

Havlicek was a three-sport athlete at Bridgeport High School in Bridgeport, Ohio, where he was a boyhood friend of Baseball Hall of Famer Phil Niekro. During his senior year of high school Havlicek earned All-Ohio honors in all three sports. As for his basketball stats, he scored 1,594 career points in 59 games along with averaging 30+ points per game his junior and senior seasons. Additionally, he scored a school record 53 points in a 103-101 overtime win over Cadiz as a junior. He also played in the Ohio North-South All-Star game with Jerry Lucas. As for the other sports he participated in, Havlicek was quarterback and captain of the football team for all four years, and hit .444 and .484 in his junior and senior seasons of baseball.

== Collegiate career ==
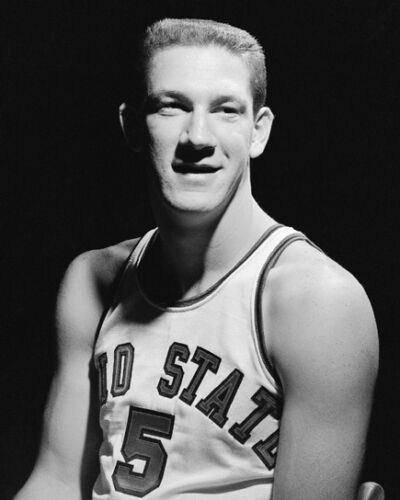
Havlicek was an All-American at Ohio State.

Havlicek played college basketball at Ohio State University with future seven-time NBA All-Star Jerry Lucas (who was his roommate), future first-round NBA draft pick Larry Siegfried, future coaching legend Bobby Knight, and Mel Nowell, among many others. He also played football under Woody Hayes during his freshman year before deciding to focus solely on basketball. During his sophomore year the 1960 Ohio State Buckeyes, coached by head coach Fred Taylor and assistant coaches Jack Graf and Frank Truitt, won the 1960 NCAA title. That year Havlicek appeared in 28 games scoring 12.2 ppg. Havlicek was named as an alternate of the 1960 United States national team that competed in the 1960 Summer Olympics. Havlicek went on to average 14.5 ppg his junior year and 17.0 ppg his senior year earning All-Big Ten honors both years and was named an All-American his senior year.

During his time at Ohio State, Havlicek was primarily known for his defensive ability, however he still managed to score 1,223 points during his three year tenure. During this period the Buckeyes won 78 of 84 games and captured the Big Ten championship all three years.

== Professional career ==
=== Boston Celtics (1960s) ===
Havlicek was drafted by the Boston Celtics of the National Basketball Association (NBA), the Cleveland Pipers of the American Basketball League (ABL), and the Cleveland Browns of the National Football League (NFL) in 1962. However, after the Pipers failed in their bid to join the NBA (partially due to Havlicek competing briefly as a wide receiver in the Browns' training camp), Havlicek became a full-time Celtic. A swingman who could play either guard or forward, he was known for his stamina, with competitors stating that it was a challenge just to keep up with him. Head coach Red Auerbach went on to call him "the guts of the team". Nicknamed "Hondo" (a nickname inspired by the 1953 movie of the same name starring John Wayne), Havlicek revolutionized the "sixth man" role in the NBA, coming off the bench for the Celtics during his early years.

During his rookie year in the 1962–63 season he played all 80 games coming off the bench and made an immediate impact averaging 14.3 PPG, 2.2 APG and 6.7 RPG. His play resulted in him being named to the NBA All-Rookie First Team. During the postseason Havlicek appeared in 11 of the Celtics 13 playoff games and averaged 11.5 PPG as he and the Celtics defeated the Los Angeles Lakers 4-2 to win the 1963 NBA Finals. The following year during the 1963-64 season Havlicek once again appeared in all 80 games. His scoring increased as he averaged nearly 20.0 PPG. This resulted in his first All-NBA Second Team selection. He also scored a regular season best 43 points during a game vs. the Baltimore Bullets on December 17, 1963. The Celtics once again finished the year with the league's best record, and Havlicek appeared in all 10 postseason games averaging 15.7 PPG as he and the Celtics defeated the San Francisco Warriors 4-1, winning his second straight championship.

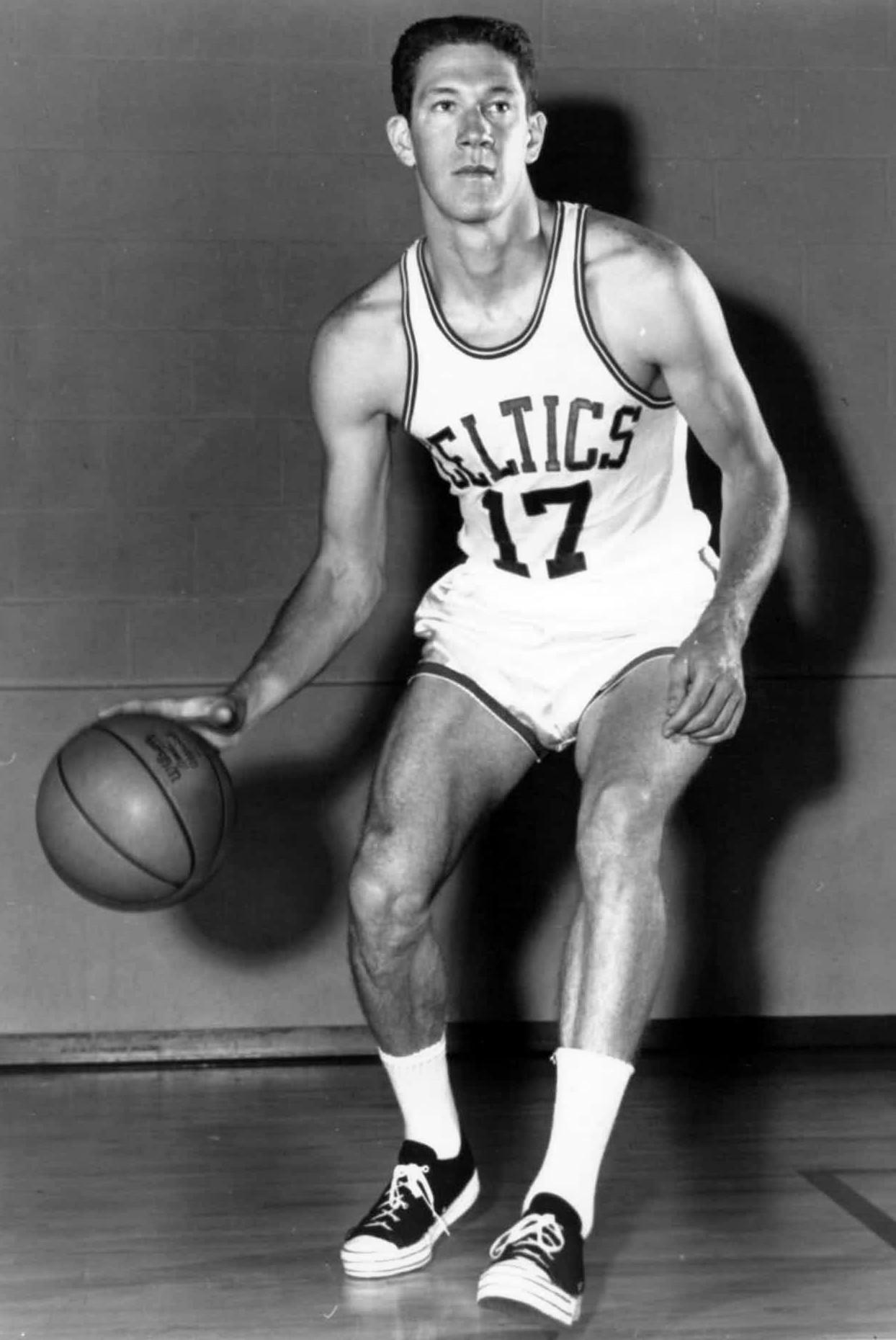
Havlicek in the 1960s

Entering his third year in the 1964-65 season Havlicek missed multiple games for the first time, but still appeared in 75 of the 80 games for the Celtics that year. His numbers slightly decreased and he averaged 18.3 PPG, just under 5 rebounds, and 3 assists a game. However during the postseason that year Havlicek was immortalized for his clutch steal in the closing seconds of the 1965 Eastern Conference Finals. In the seventh and final game, played at Boston Garden on April 15, the Celtics led the Philadelphia 76ers 110–109 with five seconds left. They only needed to inbound the ball from underneath their basket to secure the victory and advance to the 1965 NBA Finals. However, Bill Russell's pass struck one of the basket's support wires hanging down from the ceiling, leading to a turnover that gave the 76ers and Wilt Chamberlain the ball with a chance to win the game. Hal Greer was set to throw the inbounds pass for the 76ers. Havlicek stood with his back to Greer, guarding Chet Walker. But as Greer's pass came inbounds, Havlicek spun, leaped, and tipped the pass to Sam Jones. Veteran referee Earl Strom, who wrote about the game in his memoir Calling the Shots, called Havlicek's reaction one of the greatest plays he ever saw in his 32 years as a professional official. Announcer Johnny Most's call of "Havlicek stole the ball!" was dubbed by the NBA as "the most famous radio call in basketball history." He and the Celtics would go on to defeat the Lakers 4-1 in the 1965 NBA Finals, securing Havlicek's third straight title.

The 1965–66 season saw Havlicek appear in 71 games for the Celtics, averaging 18.8 PPG, 6.0 rebounds, and 3.0 assists a game. For his efforts, Havlicek was selected to his first NBA All-Star game and his second All-NBA Second Team. During the 1966 playoffs Havlicek stepped his play up even further as throughout the Celtics 17 playoff games he played 42 minutes a game off the bench and averaged 23.6 PPG along with 9.1 RPG. He and the Celtics beat both the Cincinnati Royals and Philadelphia 76ers to advance to the NBA Finals vs. the Lakers. They won their fourth straight championship, beating the Lakers 4-3. During the offseason Havlicek signed a one year contract extension with the Celtics worth $32,000. In the 1966-67 season Havlicek appeared in all 81 games and averaged 20+ PPG for the first time along with 6.6 RPG and 3.4 APG. He was selected to his second NBA All Star Game. He and the Celtics defeated the New York Knicks in the first round of the playoffs, as Havlicek averaged a playoff best 27.4 PPG. However despite his performance, they were then defeated by the 76ers 4-1 in the second round, marking the first time in Havlicek's NBA career his season did not end in a championship.

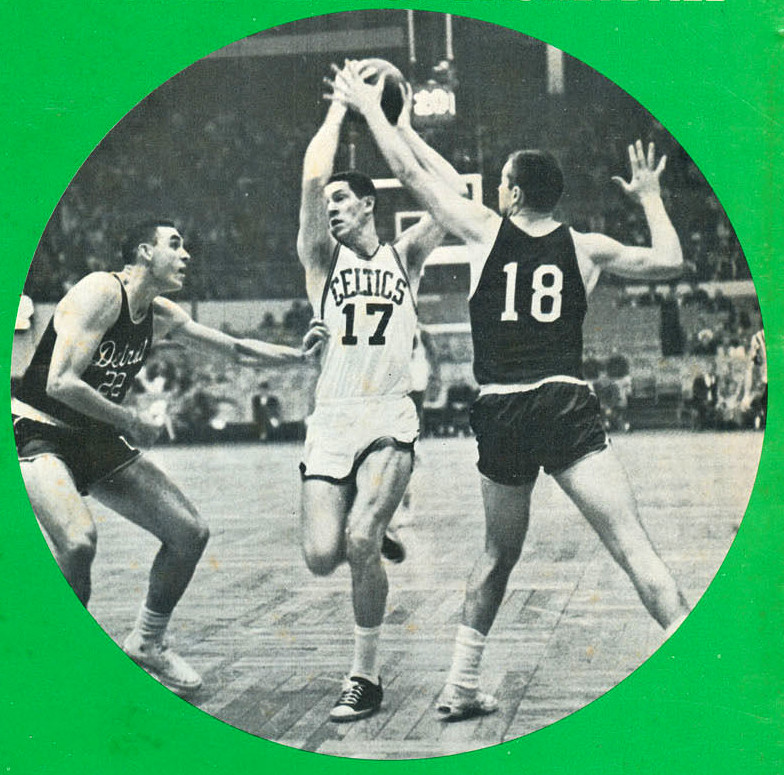
Havlicek dribbling around Dave DeBusschere, and Terry Dischinger in the mid 1960s

The following year in the 1967–68 season Havlicek appeared in all 82 games for the first time as the league added an additional game. Throughout the year his playing time increased even more as he began playing 35 minutes a game scoring 20.7 PPG, 6.7 RPG, and 4.7 APG. Havlicek was selected to his third straight NBA All-Star Game and his third All-NBA Second Team. During the postseason Havlicek's playing time went up 10 more minutes, averaging 45 minutes a game. He recorded just under 26 PPG, 8.6 RPG, and a playoff best 7.5 APG. In Game 5 of the 1968 Eastern Division Finals, Havlicek recorded a near triple-double with 29 points, nine rebounds, and 10 assists as the Celtics avoided elimination at the hands of the 76ers. He added a strong performance in game seven, recording 21 points, 12 rebounds, and eight assists in a 100–96 road win against the 76ers. In that series, the Celtics became the first NBA team to overcome a 3–1 playoff series deficit. They went on to defeat the Lakers 4-2 in the Finals marking Havlicek's fifth championship win.

Havlicek played in all 82 games for a second straight year in 1968–69. Playing 38 minutes a game, Havlicek average 21.6 PPG, 7 RPG, and 5.4 APG. Havlicek once again received multiple honors including his fourth consecutive NBA All Star selection, his fourth All-NBA Second Team, and his prowess on the defensive side of the ball was rewarded for the first time with an NBA All-Defensive Second Team selection. During that year's postseason Havlicek played a career high 47.2 minutes per game and averaged 25.4 PPG, 5.6 APG, and a career high 9.9 RPG. He and the Celtics defeated both the 76ers and Knicks before defeating the Lakers 4-3 in 1969 NBA Finals. Havlicek was a key player in the Celtics' dynasty during the 1960s. The team won NBA championships in six of his first seven NBA seasons.

=== 1970s ===
Havlicek became a full-time starter in the 1969–1970 season following the retirement of many of the Celtics prominent players such as Bill Russell, Sam Jones and K.C. Jones. That year his old teammate Tom Heinsohn became the Celtics new head coach. Heinsohn named Havlicek the Celtics' captain in 1969, a role he would hold until 1978. As many of the Celtics stars from the 1960s retired Havlicek "stood as the bridge from the Bill Russell era to the Celtics' next championship team". From here Havlicek became the Celtics star player and began playing 40+ minutes a game. During that year Havlicek played in 81 games averaging 24.2 PPG 7.8 RPG and 6.8 APG he also had a career best .464 FG%. During a game on March 8, 1970, vs. the Milwaukee Bucks Havlicek scored a regular season best 43 points. Havlicek also led the league in triple doubles with 8. He earned his 5th All-Star game and All-NBA Second Team selections along with his second NBA All-Defensive Second Team selection. Despite his tremendous play throughout the regular season, he and the Celtics missed the playoffs for the first time since 1950.

The following year in the 1970-71 season saw Havlicek play in 81 games, leading the league in minutes played with 45.4 minutes a game. This year also saw Havlicek record career highs in scoring, rebounding, and assists, with 28.9 PPG, 9.0 RPG, and 7.5 APG. He finished in the top 10 in points, assists, and free‐throw percentage. During the year Havlicek set the Celtics single season record for scoring (2338 points), field goal attempts (1982 shots), and minutes per game (45.4). For his efforts Havlicek finally earned his first All-NBA First Team selection, his sixth All-Star Game, and his third and final NBA All-Defensive Second Team selection. However despite having a winning record, the Celtics missed the playoffs for a second straight year. During the offseason Havlicek held out for one week before signing an undisclosed multi-year contract extension with the Celtics.

Havlicek played all 82 games during the 1971-72 season and once again played 45 minutes a game. Havlicek had one 40+ point game a month from January to March 1972. Havlicek continued to be the Celtics main scorer throughout the year, scoring 27.5 PPG along with 8.2 RPG and matching his career high in assists with 7.5 per game. Havlicek set another Celtics single season record that with 3698 minutes played throughout the season. Havlicek also led the league in triple doubles for a second time with 8. He received his second All-NBA First Team selection, seventh All-Star selection, and was named to his first All-Defensive First Team. That year he and the Celtics returned to the playoffs with the best record in the Eastern Conference. Havlicek averaged 27.4 PPG, 8.4 RPG, and 6.4 APG during the postseason as the Celtics advanced to the second round before being defeated 4-1 by the Knicks.

By the 1972-73 season Havlicek was still the Celtics star player; however, third year player Dave Cowens began making key contributions in his own right. Havlicek later commented: "No one ever did more for the Celtics than Dave did." During the season Havlicek played in 80 games and still played 40+ minutes a game while his numbers went down slightly. He still averaged 23.8 PPG, 7.1 RPG, and 6.6 APG. Havlicek was once again an All-NBA First Team and All Defensive First Team selection and played in his eighth All-Star Game. That year the Celtics finished with the league's best record and beat the Atlanta Hawks in the first round. During game one of the series Havlicek scored a career high 54 points and set the Celtics single game record for most points in a postseason game. However, they were then upset in seven games by the Knicks in the conference finals after Havlicek suffered a severe right shoulder injury (torn trapezius muscle) in Game 3 of the series caused by a collision with Dave DeBusschere. During the postseason Havlicek averaged 23 PPG.

Following a heartbreaking end to the previous season, Havlicek made a full recovery and he the Celtics bounced back in 1973-74. He appeared in 76 of the 82 regular season games playing 40.7 minutes a game, scoring 22.6 PPG, 6.4 RPG, and 5.9 APG. He also put up career highs with 1.3 steals and 0.4 blocks per game. Havlicek was selected for his fourth All-NBA First Team and his third All-Defensive First Team. The Celtics finished with the best record in the Eastern Conference and he, alongside Dave Cowens and Jo Jo White, helped the Celtics make a deep playoff run as they defeated both Buffalo and New York to reach the 1974 NBA Finals vs the Milwaukee Bucks. Havlicek scored 33 points in game four, 28 in game five, 36 in game six, and 16 in the pivotal game seven as the Celtics won their first NBA title since Bill Russell's retirement. For his performance throughout the series Havlicek was named NBA Finals MVP.

Coming off his seventh championship the year prior Havlicek went on to play all 82 games during the 1974–75 season marking the seventh time he appeared in every regular season game. He played 38.2 minutes per game that year, the first time since the 1970 that he had averaged under 40 minutes a game. During a game against the Portland Trail Blazers on November 6, 1974, Havlicek recorded the last 40-point game of his career. He averaged 19.2 PPG 5.9 RPG, and 5.3 APG and shot a career best .870 from the free throw line. Despite his decline in scoring Havlicek led the Celtics in scoring for the 8th straight season. This would be his last year leading the club in scoring. He was named to his fourth All-Defensive First Team and his sixth All-NBA Second Team. During that year's postseason the Celtics beat Houston in the conference semifinals before being defeated in conference finals by the Washington Bullets. Havlicek averaged 20+ points in 11 playoff games.

The following year in during the 1975-76 season Havlicek played in 76 regular season games. His production slightly decreased, scoring 17.0 PPG, 4.1 RPG, and 3.7 APG. Despite this drop in production he remained a key player for the team alongside Dave Cowens and Jo Jo White. In addition he was named to his fifth and final All-Defensive First Team and his seventh All-NBA Second Team. The Celtics finished with the best record in the East that year and defeated both Buffalo and Cleveland to advance to the 1976 NBA Finals vs the Phoenix Suns. With one second left in the second overtime of game five of the 1976 NBA Finals, Havlicek made a leaning, running bank shot that appeared to be the game-winner. Phoenix called an illegal timeout, resulting in a technical foul shot converted by Jo Jo White. However, Phoenix still had one final possession, and Gar Heard scored for Phoenix to tie the game. The Celtics went on to win in triple overtime. The game was hailed as the greatest NBA Finals game ever played. The Celtics went on to win the sixth game and Havlicek's eighth and final championship.

In 1976–77 Havlicek played in 79 games averaging 17.7 PPG, 4.8 RPG, and 5.1 APG. He was selected to his 12th straight All-Star game. He and the Celtics were defeated in the second round by Philadelphia in 7 games.

Havlicek played all 82 games during the 1977–78 season scoring 16.1 PPG along with both 4.0 RPG and APG and played in his thirteenth and final All-Star game. The Celtics missed the postseason and Havlicek officially retired at the end of the year at the age of 38. His final NBA game occurred on April 9, 1978, at Boston Garden against Buffalo, where he scored 29 points in a 108-100 victory. In April 1978, The Sporting News stated: "The consensus is that Havlicek is still better than 80 percent of the players in the NBA".

== Legacy ==
The Celtics retired Havlicek's #17 in 1978.

"'On stamina alone, he'd be among the top players who ever played the game" longtime New York Knicks coach Red Holzman once said of John "Hondo" Havlicek. "It would've been fair to those who had to play him or those who had to coach against him if he had been blessed only with his inhuman endurance. God had to compound it by making him a good scorer, smart ballhandler and intelligent defensive player with quickness of mind, hands and feet".

Havlicek retired as a 13-time NBA All-Star, and his number 17 jersey was retired by the Celtics. At the time, Havlicek was the NBA career leader in games played (a mark surpassed in 1984 by Elvin Hayes) and was in third place on the list of all-time NBA leaders in points scored. Longtime Celtics teammate Bill Russell once described Havlicek as "'the best all-around ballplayer [he] ever saw'". At the time of his death, Havlicek was the Celtics' all-time leading scorer with 26,395 points (20.8 points per game). He was also the first player to score 1,000 points in 16 consecutive seasons, with his best scoring season coming during the 1970–71 season, when he averaged 28.9 points per game. He was named to the NBA All-Defensive First Team five times and was named to the NBA All-Defensive Second Team three times.

Havlicek finished his 16-year career with eight NBA championships. As of 2019, only Bill Russell (with 11) and Sam Jones (with 10)--both of whom were Celtics teammates of Havlicek's--had won more NBA championships than he had. Havlicek won all eight NBA Finals in which he participated.

In 1980, Havlicek was selected as one of the league's greatest players ever, being named to the NBA 35th Anniversary Team. In 1984, Havlicek became a member of the Naismith Memorial Basketball Hall of Fame. In 1996, he was selected as one of the 50 Greatest Players in NBA History by a panel of journalists, players, coaches, executives, and general managers. He was also named the 14th best player of all time in Bill Simmons's Book of Basketball. In October 2021, Havlicek was again honored as one of the league's greatest players of all time by being named to the NBA 75th Anniversary Team. To commemorate the NBA's 75th Anniversary, The Athletic published their own list of the top 75 players of all time, ranking Havlicek as the 29th-greatest player in NBA history.

In 1974, Havlicek received the Golden Plate Award of the American Academy of Achievement. In 2007, Bridgeport High School in his hometown renamed their gymnasium "John J. Havlicek Gymnasium". Fellow NBA Hall of Famer Chris Mullin wore number 17 as a tribute to Havlicek. In October 2022, Havlicek was inaugurated into the Croatian-American Sports Hall of Fame. In December 2022, the NBA named the newly redesigned trophy presented to the NBA Sixth Man of the Year the "John Havlicek Trophy" in his honor.

In addition to his on-court success, Havlicek was known for his character and for his commitment to placing the team ahead of his own individual achievements. Longtime Celtics coach Red Auerbach once said, "'If I ever had a son, I would want him to be like John Havlicek'".

== Post-playing career ==
Havlicek was shrewd with his money during his playing career, and he invested much of this income in the Wendy's fast food chain during its formative years. The success of his investments left Havlicek with a comfortable income after retirement and he never had to work for a conventional salary again. He had no desire to coach; instead, he served as a corporate speaker and served as a substitute color commentator during Celtics games from 1983-1989.

Havlicek was a member of the board of the Genesis Foundation, which assists children with disabilities and genetic disorders. He and his wife Beth held the John Havlicek Celebrity Fishing Tournament for more than three decades, with proceeds going to the foundation.

== Personal life ==
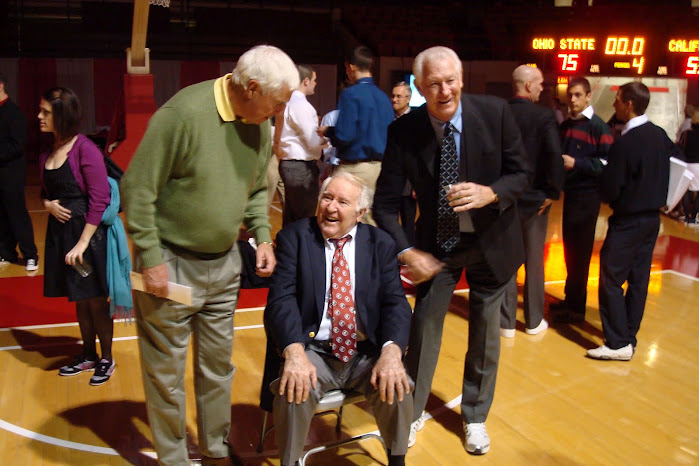
Havlicek (to the right) in 2010 with Frank Truitt with and Bob Knight

Havlicek met his wife, Beth, while both were attending Ohio State University. The couple married in 1967. They had two children: a son named Chris and a daughter named Jill. Chris Havlicek attended the University of Virginia on a basketball scholarship in the early 1990s. Jill Havlicek married former Major League Baseball outfielder and coach Brian Buchanan. He had 7 grandchildren.

During his retirement Havlicek spent his free time being an avid outdoorsmen splitting his time between Massachusetts and Florida, where he enjoyed fishing and playing golf.

Havlicek had Parkinson's disease during his later years. He died on April 25, 2019, in Jupiter, Florida at the age of 79. Following his death, Boston City Hall was lit in green in his memory. The Celtics held a special tribute their first home game following his death, which included the Celtics warmup jerseys featuring Havlicek's #17 along with tributes from his former teammates Bill Russell and Tommy Heinsohn, a highlight video, and a standing ovation from the fans in attendance.

== NBA career statistics ==
Legend
GP	Games played	GS	Games started	MPG	Minutes per game
FG%	Field goal percentage	3P%	3-point field goal percentage	FT%	Free throw percentage
RPG	Rebounds per game	APG	Assists per game	SPG	Steals per game
BPG	Blocks per game	PPG	Points per game	**Bold**	Career high
†	Won an NBA championship	*	Led the league

=== Regular season ===
Year	Team	GP	GS	MPG	FG%	3P%	FT%	RPG	APG	SPG	BPG	PPG
1962–63†	Boston	80*	—	27.5	.445	—	.728	6.7	2.2	—	—	14.3
1963–64†	Boston	80	—	32.3	.417	—	.746	5.4	3.0	—	—	19.9
1964–65†	Boston	75	—	28.9	.401	—	.744	4.9	2.7	—	—	18.3
1965–66†	Boston	71	—	30.6	.399	—	.785	6.0	3.0	—	—	18.8
1966–67	Boston	81*	—	32.1	.444	—	.828	6.6	3.4	—	—	21.4
1967–68†	Boston	**82**	—	35.6	.429	—	.812	6.7	4.7	—	—	20.7
1968–69†	Boston	**82**	—	38.7	.405	—	.780	7.0	5.4	—	—	21.6
1969–70	Boston	81	—	41.6	**.464**	—	.844	7.8	6.8	—	—	24.2
1970–71	Boston	81	—	**45.4***	.450	—	.818	**9.0**	**7.5**	—	—	**28.9**
1971–72	Boston	**82**	—	45.1*	.458	—	.834	8.2	**7.5**	—	—	27.5
1972–73	Boston	80	—	42.1	.450	—	.858	7.1	6.6	—	—	23.8
1973–74†	Boston	76	—	40.7	.456	—	.832	6.4	5.9	**1.3**	**.4**	22.6
1974–75	Boston	**82**	—	38.2	.455	—	**.870**	5.9	5.3	**1.3**	.2	19.2
1975–76†	Boston	76	—	34.2	.450	—	.844	4.1	3.7	**1.3**	**.4**	17.0
1976–77	Boston	79	—	36.9	.452	—	.816	4.8	5.1	1.1	.2	17.7
1977–78	Boston	**82**	—	34.1	.449	—	.855	4.0	4.0	1.1	.3	16.1
Career		1,270	—	36.6	.439	—	.815	6.3	4.8	1.2	.3	20.8
All-Star		13	10	23.3	.481	—	.756	3.5	2.6	.3	.0	13.8

=== Playoffs ===
Year	Team	GP	GS	MPG	FG%	3P%	FT%	RPG	APG	SPG	BPG	PPG
1963†	Boston	11	—	23.1	.448	—	.667	4.8	1.5	—	—	11.8
1964†	Boston	10	—	28.9	.384	—	.795	4.3	3.2	—	—	15.7
1965†	Boston	12	—	33.8	.352	—	.836	7.3	2.4	—	—	18.5
1966†	Boston	17	—	42.3	.409	—	.841	9.1	4.1	—	—	23.6
1967	Boston	9	—	36.7	.448	—	.803	8.1	3.1	—	—	**27.4**
1968†	Boston	**19**	—	45.4	.452	—	.828	8.6	**7.5**	—	—	25.9
1969†	Boston	18	—	**47.2**	.445	—	.855	**9.9**	5.6	—	—	25.4
1972	Boston	11	—	47.0	.460	—	.859	8.4	6.4	—	—	**27.4**
1973	Boston	12	—	39.9	.477	—	.824	5.2	5.4	—	—	23.8
1974†	Boston	18	—	45.1	**.484**	—	**.881**	6.4	6.0	1.3	.3	27.1
1975	Boston	11	—	42.2	.432	—	.868	5.2	4.6	**1.5**	.1	21.1
1976†	Boston	15	—	33.7	.444	—	.809	3.7	3.4	.8	.3	13.2
1977	Boston	9	—	41.7	.371	—	.820	5.4	6.9	.9	**.4**	18.3
Career		172	—	39.9	.436	—	.836	6.9	4.8	1.1	.3	22.0

== Career highlights and awards ==
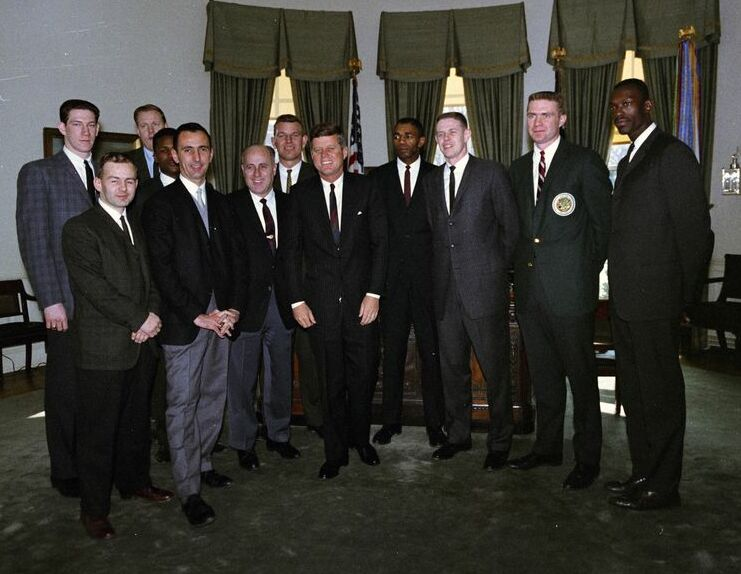
Havlicek top left meeting with President John F. Kennedy following the Celtics 1963 championship victory

=== NBA ===
- NBA champion: 1963, 1964, 1965, 1966, 1968, 1969, 1974, 1976
- NBA Finals MVP: 1974
- NBA All-Star: 1966, 1967, 1968, 1969, 1970, 1971, 1972, 1973, 1974, 1975, 1976, 1977, 1978
- All-NBA First Team: 1971, 1972, 1973, 1974
- All-NBA Second Team: 1964, 1966, 1968, 1969, 1970, 1975, 1976
- NBA All-Defensive First Team: 1972, 1973, 1974, 1975, 1976
- NBA All-Defensive Second Team: 1969, 1970, 1971
- NBA All-Rookie First Team: 1963
- NBA anniversary team 35th, 50th, 75th
- 2× NBA minutes played leaders: (1971, 1972)
- No. 17 retired by Boston Celtics on October 13, 1978
- Naismith Memorial Basketball Hall of Fame: 1984

=== College ===
- NCAA champion: 1960
- Consensus second-team All-American: 1962
- Third-team All-American AP: 1961
- First-team All-Big Ten: 1961, 1962
- Ohio State Buckeyes Athletic Hall of Fame: 1977
- No. 5 retired by Ohio State Buckeyes on February 27, 2005
- National Collegiate Basketball Hall of Fame:

=== Other honors ===
- Recipient of the Golden Plate Award of the American Academy of Achievement in 1974
- National High School Hall of Fame: 1987
- Ohio Basketball Hall of Fame: 2006
- Croatian-American Sports Hall of Fame: 2022
- Lou Holtz Hall of Fame Honoree

=== Boston Celtics records ===
Career

- Points: 26395
- Games played: 1270
- Minutes played: 46471
- Field goals: 10513
- Two point field goals: 10513

Season

- Minutes played: 3698 (1971-72)
- Two point field goals: 897 (1971-71)
- Minutes per game: 45.4 (1970-71)
- Points: 2338 (1970-71)
- Two point field goals per game: 11.0 (1970-71)
- Field goal attempts per game: 24.5 (1970-71)
- Most points in a postseason game: (54) game one of the conference semifinals in 1973

== See also ==
- List of NBA career games played leaders
- List of NBA franchise career scoring leaders
- List of NBA career scoring leaders
- List of NBA career assists leaders
- List of NBA career personal fouls leaders
- List of NBA career free throw scoring leaders
- List of NBA career minutes played leaders
- List of NBA career triple-double leaders
- List of NBA career playoff scoring leaders
- List of NBA career playoff assists leaders
- List of NBA career playoff free throw scoring leaders
- List of NBA career playoff games played leaders
- List of NBA career playoff triple-double leaders
- List of NBA single-game playoff scoring leaders
- List of NBA players who have spent their entire career with one franchise
- List of NBA annual minutes played leaders
- List of NBA players with most championships
