= Raymond Jack Last =

Australian surgeon and anatomist (1903–1993)

Raymond Jack Last (26 May 1903 – 1 January 1993), comparative anatomist, was Anatomical Curator Royal College of Surgeons 1946–50, Professor of Applied Anatomy 1950–70, Warden of Nuffield College of Surgical Sciences 1949–70, and Visiting Professor UCLA 1970–88. Last was an outstanding lecturer in postgraduate anatomy, and belonged to a small set of anatomists who were initially practising surgeons and then made a career teaching it.

== Biography ==
Henry Last, his grandfather, was from Debenham in Suffolk and jumped ship to settle in South Australia. His wife was Mary Ann Bowden who had Cornish roots. They later settled in Adelaide. Henry's eldest surviving son, John Last, worked at an Adelaide stationer and bookseller. John and his wife had 3 children, Raymond and two younger sisters, all being diligent and studious. Raymond first attended North Adelaide Primary School, from where he went on to the Adelaide Boys' High School, where another scholar and classmate was Mark Oliphant, who went on to become an eminent physicist and later, Governor of South Australia.

Assisted by a State Bursary, he enrolled at the University of Adelaide, and though underage, obtained permission to start the medical course. A brilliant trio headed the Medical School — John Burton Cleland in Pathology, Thorburn Brailsford Robertson in Physiology, and Frederic Wood Jones in Anatomy. Last was top student in all but the final year, and graduated MB BS in 1924.

In June 1939 Last and his second wife Margret, who had been Matron at Booleroo Centre District Hospital, set off for England in order to become a Fellow of the Royal College of Surgeons. With the start of World War II in September 1939 they began work at the Emergency Medical Service at the North London Fever Hospital at Winchmore Hill, later to become an annexe of the Royal London Hospital. Here Last worked under Henry Souttar.

As a member of the Australian Army Medical Corps Last was turned down by the British Army, so he was obliged to return to Australia to enlist there. MV Napier Star was torpedoed in the Irish Sea on 18 December 1940 (see List of shipwrecks in December 1940#18 December), only 28 of 99 people surviving, among which were Raymond and Margret Last. Raymond Last wrote an account of the event. They joined the British Red Cross Society and Last led a surgical team, his wife Margret being principal nurse, that formed part of the British forces sent to end the Italian occupation of Abyssinia. Last spent three years there, becoming personal physician to the Emperor Haile Selassie and his family. The closing year of the War saw Last heading a medical unit in Borneo, providing medical care for the civilian population.

When Last returned to London and the Royal College of Surgeons, the Professor of Anatomy was Frederic Wood Jones, who had tutored Last in Adelaide, and inspired an enduring interest in comparative anatomy. After some years as anatomy demonstrator and curator, Last was appointed Professor of Applied Anatomy in 1950. His textbook, 'Anatomy Regional and Applied', was first published in 1954 and heralded a new generation of anatomy texts providing a more concise option to 'Gray's Anatomy' or Cunningham's 'Textbook of Anatomy'. His own drawings were used as illustrations. It became known for its readability and interest, as it presented medical and surgical anatomy in a practical light, rather than as a colourless academic exercise. Although this is no longer a commonly held opinion, Last's Anatomy (9th Edition) is currently the recommended text by the Australasian college of Surgeons. As expected of its time, earlier editions of the textbook denote female anatomy as derivative of its male counterparts, with lesser emphasis placed on their importance and description. Last became first Warden of the Nuffield College of Surgical Sciences, the residence for medical students. On his retiring a common room was named in his honour.

From 1970 to 1987 he held the chair of visiting professor in the department of anatomy at the University of California, Los Angeles. This appointment enabled his spending winter breaks in Adelaide, where he gave lectures and demonstrations in the dissecting room of the Adelaide Medical School, often making use of his superb chalk diagrams.

The Lasts chose Malta as a final place of retirement, partly because of its tax laws and partly because of his circle of friends, which included expatriate English people, local Maltese and a sprinkling of surgeons. Failing vision limited his drawing skills; and he suffered from senile gait syndrome, necessitating assistance when standing or walking. Margret died in January 1989, and Last stayed on in Malta.

He had two sons, John and Peter, by his first wife, both graduating in medicine from Adelaide University. He had no share in their upbringing.
