= Havlicek stole the ball =

Famous call by Boston Celtics radio broadcaster Johnny Most

1965 Eastern Division Finals Game 7
Philadelphia 76ers	Boston Celtics
109	110
- Game won following the steal of an inbounds pass by John Havlicek
	1	2	3	4	Total
Philadelphia 76ers	26	36	20	27	109
Boston Celtics	35	26	29	20	110
- Date: April 15, 1965
- Venue: Boston Garden, Boston, Massachusetts

"Havlicek stole the ball" is a quote by radio broadcaster Johnny Most, as a jubilant reaction to a steal made by the Boston Celtics' John Havlicek against the Philadelphia 76ers in the 1965 NBA Eastern Division championship game seven. Most's call of the play has been dubbed by the NBA as "the most famous radio call in basketball history".

== Background ==
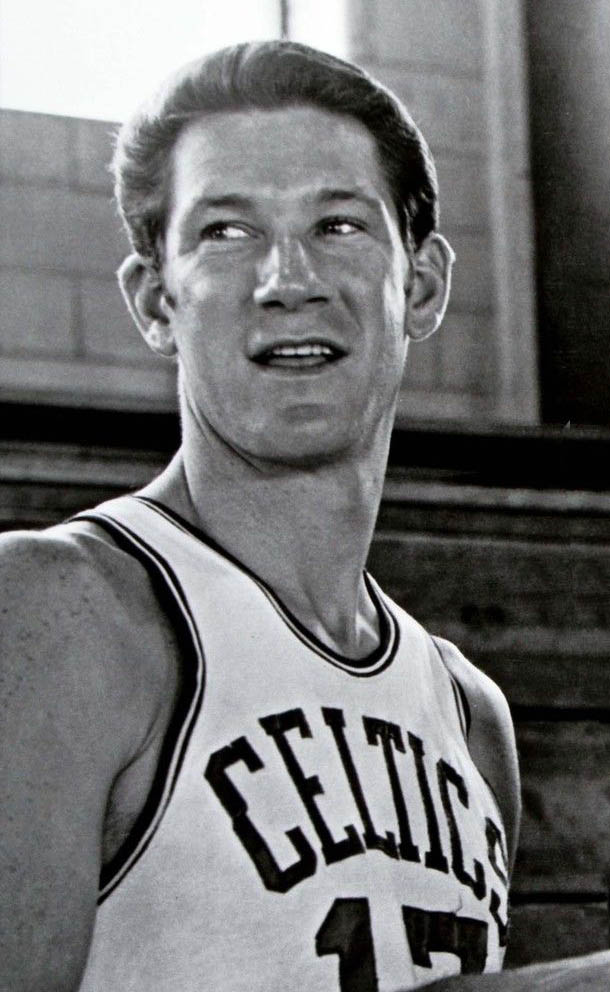
John Havlicek

Havlicek was in his third year with the Celtics, and had already won two NBA championships with the team under coach Red Auerbach. In a run that would span a total of 11 championships in 15 years (including four before Havlicek joined the team) with center Bill Russell among a lineup of future Hall of Fame members, Auerbach singled out his swingman Havlicek as the "guts of the team". Other standouts on the team included Tom Heinsohn, Sam Jones, K.C. Jones, John Thompson, and Satch Sanders, all of whom would be named to the Basketball Hall of Fame. Entering the playoffs, the Celtics had won the Eastern Division regular season championship, which granted them a bye into the division finals.

Their opponents would be the Philadelphia 76ers, who were led by star center Wilt Chamberlain, a player they had acquired just that season in a mid-year trade. Chamberlain, who had previously played for the prior Philadelphia team, the Philadelphia Warriors, was something of a local hero and was also noted for his long rivalry with the Celtics center Bill Russell. Philadelphia had its own cast of future Hall of Famers to support Chamberlain, including Hal Greer and Chet Walker. The 76ers played the Cincinnati Royals in a five-game series for the opening round of the playoffs; they defeated the Royals in four games to advance to the Division Finals against the top-seeded Celtics. During the first six games of the seven-game finals series, the Celtics and 76ers alternated victories on their home courts to tie the series at 3–3 and bring on a deciding game seven.

The final game was held at the Boston Garden on April 15. Boston had trailed by one point at half time, but had turned it around in the third quarter and held a healthy 11-point lead in the waning minutes, with Havlicek and teammate Sam Jones accounting for over half of the Celtics 110 points. In a flurry of late scoring, Chamberlain took control of the game and scored 10 consecutive points to bring the game to 110–109 with five seconds to go. Following Chamberlain's last basket, the Celtics center Bill Russell inbounded the ball from under his own basket, attempting a long pass down the court, however the high pass hit a guide wire holding up the basket. As a result, Philadelphia got the ball under its own basket, putting them into position to take the lead. Auerbach would later claim that the reason Russell's inbound hit the guide wire was because the wire hadn't been there until that series, so Russell was not entirely aware of it being there in the way of his inbound pass.

== The play ==
Philadelphia put the ball in the hands of guard Hal Greer. Greer first looked to Wilt Chamberlain, however the long-armed Bill Russell was guarding Chamberlain closely, frustrating Greer's attempt to get him the ball. That left Greer's best target as forward Chet Walker, who was being covered by Havlicek. Havlicek was playing a bit off from Walker, giving Greer an opening to inbound the ball. By rule, a player has only five seconds to inbound the ball, and with Greer looking first to Chamberlain and waiting as long as possible before changing his mind, Havlicek counted silently down to four and, anticipating Greer's pass, broke toward Walker. Greer's high lob to Walker was cut short when Havlicek leaped and with his right hand deflected the ball to teammate Sam Jones, who dribbled out the rest of regulation. As the buzzer sounded, Jones passed the ball back to Havlicek, who launched a half-hearted shot towards the basket, it inconsequentially fell to the floor as time expired, preserving the win for the Celtics, and giving them the Eastern Division championship en route to their seventh straight NBA championship.

In what has since been named the greatest call in the history of basketball, radio announcer Johnny Most became increasingly animated as he called down the final five seconds of play:

Greer is putting the ball into play. He gets it out deep and Havlicek steals it! Over to Sam Jones! Havlicek stole the ball! It's all over! It's all over! Johnny Havlicek is being mobbed by the fans! It's all over! Johnny Havlicek stole the ball!

At the conclusion of the game, an elated Boston crowd rushed the floor, lifting Havlicek on their shoulders and marching him around the court, ripping Havlicek's jersey off of him in the process. Havlicek would later mention how he'd always encounter random Celtic fans over the years who would show him a piece of the torn jersey that they acquired.

== Legacy ==
The steal is marked as one of the greatest moments in NBA history. Sports Illustrated ranked it as the No. 61 moment in all of sports. The New England Historical Society dubbed it the greatest broadcast moment in basketball history.

Havlicek went on to become the Celtics' all-time leading scorer with 26,395 points in a Celtics record 1,270 games played. He was inducted into the Naismith Memorial Basketball Hall of Fame in 1984.

Most was a fixture as the radio announcer for Celtics games for decades, finally retiring in 1990. Amongst the retired numbers in the rafters at the Celtics home court is a microphone in Most's honor. After his death, he was awarded the Curt Gowdy Media Award by the Basketball Hall of Fame for his on-air contributions to basketball, including the Havlicek call.
