= Richard Branda =

American actor and writer

- Born: Richard James Branda; August 28, 1935; Port Arthur, Texas, U.S.
- Died: January 7, 1993 (aged 57); Los Angeles, California, U.S.
- Occupation: Actor
- Years active: 1954-1987
- Spouse: Eileen Friedman (1965-1993)
- Children: 3

Richard James Branda (August 28, 1935 – January 7, 1993) was an American actor and writer. He appeared in numerous plays, films and TV series throughout the 1950s to the 1980s.

== Biography ==
Branda was born in Jefferson County, Texas in 1935, the youngest of five brothers. After serving for two years as a theatrical director in the Armed Forces, his acting career began at the Stratford Festival in 1961, performing in shows like The Great White Hope or Dr. Faustus.

He appeared in TV series like Baretta, McMillan & Wife, Tabitha and Quincy, M.E. among others.

He also acted in films such as Lilith, The French Connection, Death Wish, Two-Minute Warning.

== Personal life ==
Branda was married to Eileen Friedman, whom he had three daughters, Jennifer, Leslie and Allison.

== Death ==
Branda died of colon cancer in Los Angeles on January 7, 1993. He was buried at Eden Memorial Park Cemetery.

== Selected filmography ==
=== Film ===
- Lilith (1964)
- The French Connection (1971)
- Death Wish (1974)
- Two-Minute Warning (1976)
- Student Bodies (1981)

=== Television ===
- You Are There (1954)
- Baretta (1975)
- McMillan & Wife (1975)
- Tabitha (1977)
- Quincy, M.E. (1979)
