= J. J. Griffin Jr. =

American politician

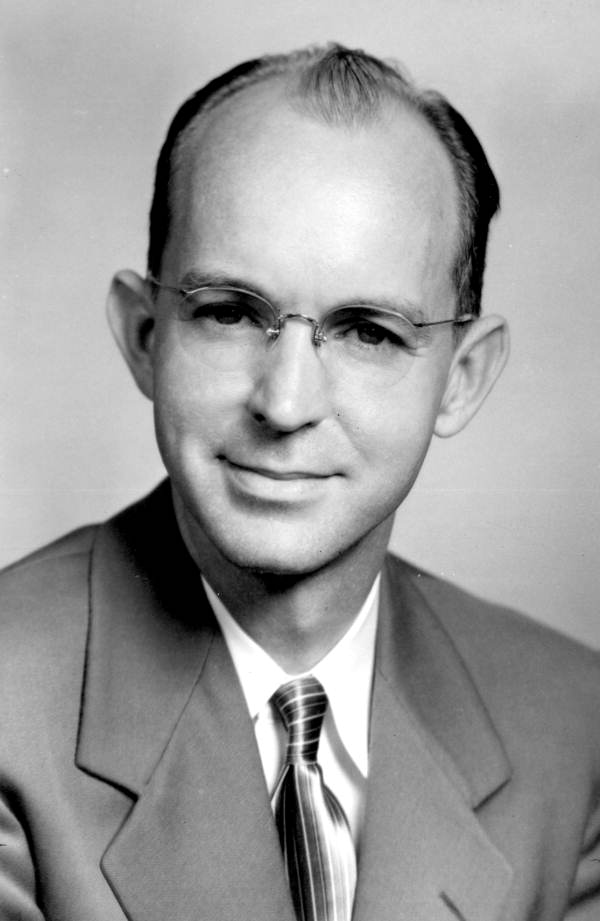
- Griffin in 1953

Member of the Florida House of Representatives from Osceola County
- In office 1953–1966

Member of the Florida House of Representatives from Orange–Osceola
- In office 1966–1967

Personal details
- Born: January 16, 1913 Kissimmee, Florida, U.S.
- Died: January 4, 1993 (aged 79)
- Party: Democratic

J. J. Griffin Jr. (January 16, 1913 – January 4, 1993), also known as Joseph Jefferson Griffin Jr., was an American politician. He served as a Democratic member of the Florida House of Representatives.

== Life and career ==
Griffin was born in Kissimmee, Florida. He attended Riverside Military Academy.

Griffin served in the Florida House of Representatives from 1953 to 1967.

Griffin died on January 4, 1993, at the age of 79.
