= Alfred T. Airth =

American politician

Member of the Florida House of Representatives from Suwannee County
- In office 1931

Personal details
- Born: February 2, 1906
- Died: January 2, 1993 (aged 86)
- Party: Democratic

Alfred T. Airth (February 2, 1906 – January 2, 1993) was an American politician. He served as a Democratic member of the Florida House of Representatives.
