= Karl-Heinz Scherzinger =

German cross-country skier (1944–1993)

Personal information
- Nationality: German
- Born: 18 May 1944; Krummendeich, Germany
- Died: 16 January 1993 (aged 48); Furtwangen im Schwarzwald, Germany

Sport
- Sport: Cross-country skiing

Karl-Heinz Scherzinger (18 May 1944 – 16 January 1993) was a German cross-country skier. He competed in the men's 30 kilometre event at the 1968 Winter Olympics.
