= Harry Gingell =

Australian rules footballer, born 1916

Personal information
- Full name: Harry Gingell
- Born: 24 May 1916
- Died: 17 January 1993 (aged 76)
- Original team: Air Force / Carlton Seconds
- Height: 185 cm (6 ft 1 in)
- Weight: 90 kg (198 lb)

Playing career^{1}
Years	Club	Games (Goals)
1943, 1945	Footscray	26 (2)
- ^{1} Playing statistics correct to the end of 1945.

Harry Gingell (24 May 1916 – 17 January 1993) was a former Australian rules footballer who played with Footscray in the Victorian Football League (VFL).
