= Allan Buchanan (footballer) =

Australian rules footballer

Personal information
- Full name: Allan William Buchanan
- Born: 12 March 1916; Launching Place, Victoria
- Died: 27 January 1993 (aged 76)
- Original team: East Malvern Amateurs

Playing career^{1}
Years	Club	Games (Goals)
1938	St Kilda	1 (0)
- ^{1} Playing statistics correct to the end of 1938.

Allan William Buchanan (12 March 1916 – 27 January 1993) was an Australian rules footballer who played for the St Kilda Football Club in the Victorian Football League (VFL).
