= Rob McEwen (footballer) =

Australian rules footballer

Personal information
- Full name: Robert Gordon McEwen
- Born: 23 October 1926; North Melbourne, Victoria
- Died: 24 January 1993 (aged 66)
- Original team: North Melbourne Colts
- Height: 178 cm (5 ft 10 in)
- Weight: 79 kg (174 lb)

Playing career^{1}
Years	Club	Games (Goals)
1947	North Melbourne	1 (0)
- ^{1} Playing statistics correct to the end of 1947.

Robert Gordon McEwen (23 October 1926 – 24 January 1993) was an Australian rules footballer who played with North Melbourne in the Victorian Football League (VFL).

McEwen enlisted in the Royal Australian Air Force three weeks after his eighteenth birthday, serving from November 1944 until the end of World War II.
