= Johnny Most =

American sportscaster (1923–1993)

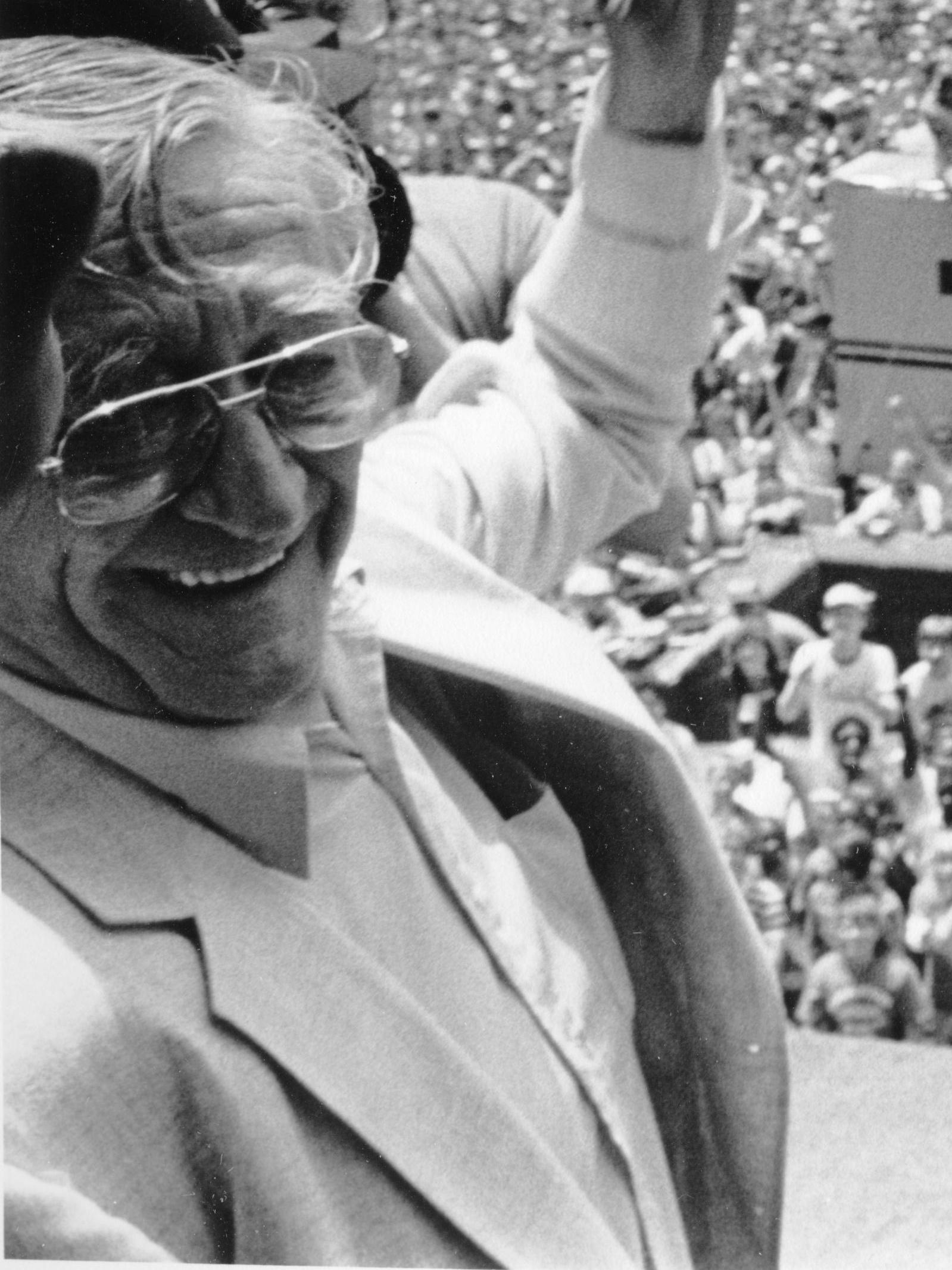
- Most in 1984
- Born: John M. Most; June 15, 1923; New York City, New York, U.S.
- Died: January 3, 1993 (aged 69); Boston, Massachusetts, U.S.
- Occupations: Sports Announcer; radio personality

John M. Most (June 15, 1923 – January 3, 1993) was an American sports announcer, known primarily as the raspy radio voice of the Boston Celtics of the National Basketball Association (NBA) from 1953 to 1990.

Most's radio call during the final moments of Game 7 of the 1965 NBA Eastern Division Finals has been dubbed "the most famous radio call in basketball history" by the NBA. The call is now simply known as "Havlicek stole the ball!"

== Biography ==
=== Early life and career ===
Born in New York City, he was named after his paternal grandfather, the German-American anarchist newspaper editor and orator Johann Most. Johnny Most was one of the many successful graduates of DeWitt Clinton High School in the Bronx. After distinguished Air Force service in World War II (see below), he began his basketball broadcasting career in the late 1940s as a protégé of New York Knickerbockers announcer (and 1936 Olympics track star) Marty Glickman. He was hired in 1953 by Boston Celtics owner Walter Brown and coach Red Auerbach to replace Curt Gowdy as the team's radio play-by-play man on the Celtics radio network. He also served as sports director for WCOP radio in Boston at that time.

In addition to his work with the Celtics, he served as host of a rudimentary Boston Red Sox baseball post-game show on WHDH-TV, sister station to WHDH radio which carried Celtics games. Sponsored by Wheaties and Blackstone cigars, this short scoreboard program consisted of Most reading the scores and rattling off pitching changes and home runs. It began in 1958 and ended when WHDH-TV lost its license just before the 1972 season and the telecasts were moved to WBZ-TV. Most also teamed with Marty Glickman to call New York Giants football in the early 1950s.

In the early 1970s, Most hosted an evening sports talk show on WORL radio which lasted from 5 to 7 PM. WBZ, owner of the Celtics' radio rights, allowed Most to appear only on the first hour of the program, which was broadcast live from a Boston nightspot, so as not to compete with WBZ's Calling All Sports broadcast.

=== World War II ===
As an aerial gunner on a B-24 Liberator he flew 28 combat missions with the 15th Air Force in World War II, earning seven medals.

Shortly after VE Day, as his unit broke camp in central Italy, Johnny wandered up a nearby hillside to a graveyard filled with American flags, his final visit to fallen comrades before returning home to the Bronx. A prolific poet, he penned these lines:

I stood among the graves today and swept the scene with sight.
And the corps of men who lay beneath looked up to say good night.
The thunder still, the battle done, the fray has passed them by;
And as they rest forever more, they must be asking, 'Why?'

== Commentating style ==
Most always referred to his perch or radio booth at the Boston Garden (the Celtics' arena) as "high above courtside" at the opening of his broadcasts, and to his usual perch near the scorer's table on most Celtics road games as "directly at courtside".

Unlike his long-time contemporary Chick Hearn, who criticized his Los Angeles Lakers when he felt warranted, Most was an outspoken "homer" who rarely criticized the Celtics during game play but was not shy about criticizing other teams' players or fans (calling them "hysterical with joy" when cheering Celtics losses). For example, during the 1985 season, he nicknamed Laker star point guard Magic Johnson "Crybaby Johnson" after Johnson successfully challenged a referee's call. He called Magic this negative nickname throughout the remainder of the 1980s, announcing lines like "Cry with the no-look pass!" and "Crybaby with the rebound!" He also nicknamed Washington Bullets players Rick Mahorn and Jeff Ruland as "McFilthy" and "McNasty", interchanging the two at his whim, and he also referred to Philadelphia 76ers players Steve Mix, Bobby Jones and Andrew Toney as "The Hatchet Brothers". Most was also very critical of the Detroit Pistons for their physical play during the late 1980s. He was particularly hard on Bill Laimbeer (whom he memorably called "Counterfeit Bill"), Dennis Rodman, Rick Mahorn, and Isiah Thomas, whom he referred to as Little Lord Fauntleroy.

== Other work ==
From 1963 to 1966, Most was the track announcer at the Norwood Arena Speedway, a NASCAR-sanctioned quarter mile oval. Among the winners of races during his tenure include NASCAR Hall of Fame member Fireball Roberts, Daytona 500 champion Pete Hamilton, and short track legends Bob Santos (whose grandson Bobby Santos III is a 21st-century Modified racer), and Ed Flemke Sr. (Modified racing family; son-in-law was a Monster Energy NASCAR Cup Series race winner; his grandchildren own a car dealership in Fitchburg).

In 1965, Most served as a color commentator for one Boston Bruins game when play-by-play announcer Fred Cusick was sick and color commentator Bob Wilson filled in on play-by-play.

In the summer of 1978, Most called races at Plainfield Greyhound Track in Plainfield, Connecticut.

== Retirement, death and honors ==
A heavy smoker for his entire adult life, Most was plagued with health problems beginning in 1983, when he suffered a stroke that left his right hand permanently paralyzed. In 1989, he underwent triple-bypass surgery, and in January 1992 had to have both legs amputated above the knee due to circulation problems. In his later years he also suffered hearing problems and was often dependent on an oxygen mask to help him breathe. Most nonetheless kept up his two-pack-a-day cigarette habit, even after smoking was banned inside Boston Garden.

On October 10, 1990, Most announced his retirement due to failing health. On December 3 of that year, Most was honored with permanent installation of his personal microphone at Boston Garden, silver-plated and encased in a Celtic-green frame and attached to the façade of the vantage point Most had always described as "high above courtside". On January 3, 1993, he died at 69 of a heart attack in Hyannis, Massachusetts on Cape Cod. He is buried in the Baker Street Jewish Cemeteries, West Roxbury, Massachusetts.

Shortly after his death, he was awarded the prestigious Curt Gowdy Media Award by the trustees of the Basketball Hall of Fame in Springfield, Massachusetts for his on-air contributions to basketball. On October 4, 2002, he was inducted into the media sector of the New England Basketball Hall of Fame at the University of Rhode Island.
