= NYC Basketball Hall of Fame =

New York City Basketball Hall of Fame
- Established: 1990
- Location: New York City
- Type: Basketball Hall of Fame
- Accreditation: 501(c)(3)
- Founders: Bob Williams, Howard Garfinkel, Tom Konchalski, Cecil Watkins, Peter Vecsey, Howie Evans, Larry "Scout" Pearlstein, Bill Travers
- President: Zak Ivkovic
- CEO: Zak Ivkovic
- Chairperson: Keri Watkins-Webb
- Website: Official website

The New York City Basketball Hall of Fame celebrates over 125 years of basketball history in the city and recognizes and honors the best basketball players, coaches, referees, promoters and contributors in the history of the sport in New York.

Candidates for the hall are nominated for the honor by the public and chosen annually by a select committee consisting of Hall of Famers, media personalities, former players and coaches.

The governing body of the hall was most recently appointed by their peers in July 2025 for a two-year term.

== History ==
The New York City Basketball Hall of Fame's inaugural class was inducted in September 1990. The hall's first class included all-time basketball superstars Kareem Abdul-Jabbar, Billy Cunningham, Coach Arnold “Red” Auerbach, Coach Claire Bee, Bob Cousy, William “Pop” Gates, Connie Hawkins, Coach Dick McGuire, Holcombe Rucker, Adolph Schayes and Ms. Zelda Spoelstra.

The second class included: Dolly King, Fuzzy Levane, Ned Irish, Tiny Archibald, Bobby Wanzer, Bob Douglas and Coaches Red Sarachek, Lenny Wilkins, Nat Holman and Red Holtzman.

A total of twenty eight classes of inductees were enshrined between 1990 and 2017 by the founders Robert A. "Bob" Williams, Howard "Garf" Garfinkel, Cecil Watkins, Tom Konchalski, Larry "Scout" Pearlstein, Bill Travers, and Howie Evans. As of March 2026, the only remaining founder was sports columnist Peter Vecsey (Class of 2001).

The New York City Basketball Hall of Fame Class of 2024 was inducted on September 19 of 2024 before a sell-out crowd at the Barclays Center in Brooklyn.

The New York City Basketball Hall of Fame Class of 2025 was inducted in a sold-out gala on February 24, 2026.

== Inductees ==
Listed by induction year

=== 1990 ===
- Kareem Abdul-Jabbar
- Billy Cunningham
- Red Auerbach
- Clair Bee
- Bob Cousy
- Pop Gates
- Connie Hawkins
- Dick McGuire
- Holcombe Rucker
- Dolph Schayes
- Zelda Spoelstra

=== 1991 ===
- Nate "Tiny" Archibald
- Bob Douglas
- Nat Holman
- Red Holzman
- Ned Irish
- Dolly King
- Andrew "Fuzzy' Levane
- Bernard "Red" Sarachek
- Bobby Wanzer
- Lenny Wilkens

=== 1992 ===
- Jack "Dutch" Garfinkel
- Marty Glickman
- Sihugo "Si" Green
- Richie Guerin
- Sidney "Sonny" Hertzberg
- John Isaacs
- Joe Lapchick
- Frank McGuire
- Willis Reed
- Satch Sanders

=== 1993 ===
- Roger Brown
- Lou Carnesecca
- Tony Jackson
- Leonard Lewin
- Nancy Liberman-Cline
- Jim McMillian
- Jammy Moskowitz
- John Nucatola
- Sid Tannenbaum
- Max Zaslofsky
- '38-'39 James Madison Championship Team

=== 1994 ===
- Norm Drucker
- Mickey Fisher
- Ernie Grunfeld
- Bernard King
- Bobby McDermott
- Al McGuire
- Claude "Red" Phillips
- Cal Ramsey
- Ossie Schechtman
- ‘49-50 CCNY Championship Team

=== 1995 ===
- Al Badain
- Arlington "Ollie" Edinboro
- Bernie Fliegel
- Charles Scott
- Alan Seiden
- ‘69-70 NBA Championship New York Knicks

=== 1996 ===
- Marv Albert
- Jerry Fleishman
- Rudy La Russo
- Howard Cann
- Donnie Forman
- Julius Erving
- Vinnie Johnson
- The N.Y. Renaissance

=== 1997 ===
- Harry Boykoff
- World B. Free
- Kevin Loughery
- Lou Rossini
- Cecil Watkins
- Milton Kutsher
- St. John's Wonder Five

=== 1998 ===
- Mel Davis
- Ray Lumpp
- Dean Meminger
- Doug Moe
- Irv Torgoff
- Frank Layden
- Bill Spiegel
- Charles "Doc" Turner

=== 1999 ===
- John Goldner
- Hy Gotkin
- Carl Green
- Sidney Green
- Howard Jones
- Kevin Joyce
- Tom Stith
- Jim Valvano

=== 2000 ===
- Rolando Blackman
- Ralph Kaplowitz
- John Condon
- Jack Donohue
- Lucille Kyvallos
- Jack McMahon
- Kenny Smith
- Brian Winters
- Power Memorial HS. ‘63-64

=== 2001 ===
- Dan Buckley
- Jack DeFares
- Mike Dunleavy
- Len Elmore
- Tom Hemans
- Mac Kinsbruner
- Jim McDermott
- Peter Vecsey

=== 2002 ===
- Fred Crawford
- Larry Fleischer
- Charlie Hoxie
- Albert King
- Chris Mullin
- Mark Reiner
- Solly Walker

=== 2003 ===
- Ed Conlin
- Floyd Layne
- Alfred "Butch" Lee
- John Roche
- Danny Lynch
- Richard "Chink" Gaines
- 1959-60 Boys High Team

=== 2004 ===
- LeRoy Ellis
- James "Buck" Freeman
- John Lee
- George Kaftan
- Malik Sealy
- Emilio "Zeke" Sinicola
- Herb Turetzky
- 1972–73 Queens College Team

=== 2005 ===
- John Bach
- Jack Curran
- Lou Eisenstein
- Clarence "Puggy" Bell
- Vern Fleming
- Lenny Rosenbluth
- Willie Rubenstein
- Dwayne "Pearl" Washington
- The Original Celtics Team

=== 2006 ===
- Stacey Arceneaux
- George Gregory
- Jamal Mashburn
- Nevil "Butch" Shed
- Willie Cager
- Mark Jackson
- Rick Pitino
- Mickey Crowley
- Tommy Kearns
- John "Honey" Russell
- Willie Worsley

=== 2007 ===
- Burt Beagle
- Walter Berry
- Al Bianchi
- Bobby Cremins
- Mario Elie
- Ed Pinckney
- Hank Rosenstein
- Bob Wolff

=== 2008 ===
- Kenny Anderson
- Louis "LuLu" Bender
- Pete Gillen
- Joe Goldstein
- Bob McCullough
- Sam Perkins
- Rod Strickland
- Eddie Younger

=== 2009 ===
- John Andariese
- John Crawford
- Armond Hill
- John Kresse
- Gail Marquis
- Spencer Ross
- John Salley
- Bill Schaeffer
- Sam Schoenfeld

=== 2010 ===
- George Johnson
- Teddy Jones
- Barney Sedran
- Anthony Mason
- Joe Mullaney
- Isaac "Rab" Walthour
- Phil Sellers
- George Kalinsky

=== 2011 ===
- Ken Charles
- Jim Larrañaga
- Donnie Walsh
- Sonny Dove
- Debbie Mason
- John Warren
- Tom Henderson
- Mike Saunders

=== 2012 ===
- Dick Bavetta
- Don Goldstein
- Ricky Sobers
- Ray Felix
- Jack Kaiser
- Charlie Yelverton
- Charles Granby
- Connie Simmons

=== 2013 ===
- Vaughn Harper
- Don Kennedy
- Hank Whitney
- Jerry Harkness
- Manny Sokal
- Lee Jones
- George Thompson

=== 2014 ===
- Craig "Speedy" Claxton
- Hugh Evans
- Mike Riordan
- Felipe Lopez
- Jack Rohan
- Charlie Davis
- Tom Owens
- Christ the King Regional High School 1993 team

=== 2015 ===
- Mike Davis
- Geoff Huston
- Bob McKillop
- Willie Hall
- Richard Lapchick
- Sam Worthen
- Chamique Holdsclaw
- Johnny Mathis

=== 2016 ===
- Gus Alfieri
- Howard Garfinkel
- Sam Stith
- Steve Burtt
- Olden Polynice
- Jayson Williams
- Jim Couch
- Jerry Reinsdorf
- Willie Worsley

=== 2017 ===
- Ron Behagen
- Jackie Jackson
- Steve Lappas
- Larry Lembo
- Anne Gregory O’Connell
- Lamar Odom
- Kevin Stacom
- Robert A. Williams

=== 2018-2023 ===
- No activity

=== 2024 ===
- Tina Charles
- Lauren Cargill
- Jonathan Halpert
- Gil Reynolds
- Joe Hammond
- Raymond Delmau
- Ronnie Nunn
- Tom Konchalski
- Jack Powers
- Charley Rosen

=== 2025 ===
- Sue Bird
- Stephon Marbury
- Richard "Peewee" Kirkland
- Ron Naclerio
- Mo Hicks
- Shelly Schneider
- Chuck Stogel
- John Paquette
- NYU Women 2024/NYU Women 2025
- 2024 New York Liberty

== See also ==
- Naismith Basketball Hall of Fame
