= Tom Konchalski =

American basketball scout (1947–2021)

- Born: January 8, 1947; New York City, U.S.
- Died: February 8, 2021 (aged 74); New York City, U.S.
- Occupation: Basketball scout
- Known for: High School Basketball Illustrated

Thomas Coman Konchalski (January 8, 1947 – February 8, 2021) was an American high school basketball scout. Konchalski published a well-known newsletter called High School Basketball Illustrated. In 2023, he was elected to the National Collegiate Basketball Hall of Fame as a contributor to the game.

== Early life ==
Thomas Coman Konchalski was born on January 8, 1947, in Manhattan. He grew up in Elmhurst, Queens, with his father, Stephen, a general foreman for the city's Parks Department and semi-professional baseball player, and his mother, Marjorie, a homemaker turned cashier. He had two siblings, a brother, Steve, and a sister, Judy. Steve would later become a highly successful college basketball coach in Canada. Konchalski's uncle, John, was a tennis umpire. Konchalski was an altar boy at his local church, which was a few blocks away from where he played pick-up basketball. When Konchalski was 8, his father took him and Steve to an NBA game at Madison Square Garden, with Konchalski and Steve later frequenting games there by themselves.

At 14, Konchalski watched Connie Hawkins play in a summer league basketball game, and felt his calling towards basketball after being impressed by Hawkins' play. Konchalski attended Archbishop Molloy High School, where he covered for the school's newspaper and learned basketball from the school's coach, Jack Curran, but never played. Konchalski graduated magna cum laude from Fordham University in 1968 with a bachelor's degree in philosophy and political science.

== Career ==
After graduating from Fordham, Konchalski taught math and social studies at a Roman Catholic school in Queens. Konchalski also worked as a line umpire for tennis matches, including umpiring at the US Open.

In 1979, Konchalski left teaching to work for basketball scout Howard Garfinkel, the founder of High School Basketball Illustrated (HSBI) and the revered Five-Star Basketball Camp. Garfinkel was originally irked by Konchalski, as the latter was seen with Mike Tyneberg, who had brought Garfinkel into basketball but later had a falling out with. Konchalski and Garfinkel established friendly relations with the help of basketball scout Dick Maloney in 1970. In 1983, following an NCAA rule prohibiting Garfinkel from running HSBI and the Five-Star Basketball Camp, he sold the former to Konchalski. Konchalski supplied 220 subscribers with 16 reports that cost $400 annually. The report included thirteen criteria for grading a player, such as shooting or passing the ball, with other metrics like players' SAT score included as well to culminate in Konchalski's personal rating. Konchalski graded from a scale of 1 to 5, with a 1 meaning Division II or Division III talent and a 5 meaning an expected major contributor to a nationally ranked Division I program. Konchalski also added a "+" or "-" to each grade, with a "+" meaning a player possibly could excel at their prescribed level and a "-" meaning that a player could potentially but not definitively perform to Konchalski's prediction. Konchalski's highest ranking, a 5+, was a rare grade and was only given to players whom Konchalski believed could perform at an exceptional level. Konchalski prepared his reports every three weeks and would mail out his reports in hard copy only. His reports were famous for including pithy remarks for each player, such as, "Scores like we breathe!" and "loaded with offensive chutzpah."

Konchalski was renowned for his prescience in scouting high school basketball players. Konchalski advised Tennessee basketball assistant coach Stu Aberdeen to recruit Ernie Grunfeld and future Hall of Famer Bernard King. While working under Garfinkel, Konchalski encouraged him and then North Carolina basketball assistant coach Roy Williams to invite Michael Jordan to the Five-Star Basketball Camp. When LeBron James played at Five-Star in 2000, Konchalski urged The Sporting News journalist Mike DeCourcy that he had to watch him play. Konchalski also said of James, in his junior year of high school, that the latter had a better feel for the game than Vince Carter and Tracy McGrady. Konchalski called future NBA All-Star Kenny Anderson the "greatest high school point guard of all time." He also predicted that the career for highly coveted prospect Lloyd Daniels would not pan out as many expected due to the latter's turbulent life outside of basketball. Konchalski scouted many prolific players early into their basketball careers, with him first scouting Chris Mullin as a 7th grader, and both Kyrie Irving and Kobe Bryant as a freshman in high school.

Konchalski retired from publishing his newsletter in 2020 due to health concerns.

== Personal life ==
Konchalski was known for not using many pieces of modern technology in his work. He never owned a computer, and only used a cellphone after his retirement. Instead, Konchalski used a typewriter to compile each edition of HSBI. Konchalski owned an answering machine for only six months before discarding it, attributing the decision to spending too much time returning calls. Rick Pitino called Konchalski "the single toughest person in the world to reach." Konchalski also did not have a car or a driver's license. Konchalski would have coaches or friends drive him hours between states in the U.S. to scout high school basketball players. Konchalski lived at home until he was 38, when his mother died in 1984. He then moved into a one-bedroom apartment in Forest Hills, where he rarely stayed and had nothing displayed on the walls.

Konchalski was also attributed to having a strong memory relating to his field. According to Bill Raftery, Garfinkel once showed Konchalski a photo of eight basketball players going for a rebound, with Konchalski being able to name every one and people in each of their lives. A New York Times article recounted how Konchalski could quickly remember players he scouted from decades before and at what event he scouted them. Sports marketing executive Kevin Foley said Konchalski's ability to remember so many names without the aid of a phone was "uncanny". Sportswriter and friend of Konchalski, Adam Zagoria, wrote that the former had an incredible knack for remembering small details even while he was in the hospital. Konchalski said of his reputed great memory, "You remember the things you care about most."

Konchalski never married and had no children, saying that "Basketball has been my mistress, but my faith is my lawful wife." He was a devout Catholic and attended mass daily.

=== Illness and death ===
In 2019, Konchalski was diagnosed with metastatic prostate cancer. Konchalski was admitted to Mount Sinai West in 2021 with complications from his illness. On February 6, Konchalski was moved to Calvary Hospital, a hospice and care facility, per his wishes. Konchalski died there two days later on February 8, at the age of 74. He was visited by many friends and family members shortly before his death, with two lifelong friends, Joe Dunleavy and Barry Rohrssen, along with Konchalski's cousin John Coman by his side as he died.

== Legacy ==
Konchalski's scouting was admired and respected by many basketball coaches. Former Wake Forest and South Carolina head coach Dave Odom said about Konchalski, "you took what he said as gospel." after he recruited Tre Kelley based on seeing him in HSBI. High school basketball coach Bob Hurley said Konchalski "had a genuine interest in getting his evaluations right." Joe Mihalich called Konchalski "an icon, and truly loved by the basketball world.", also saying that the latter's retirement from HSBI was "the end of an era." Gary Williams said that Konchalski would tell the same information to every coach regardless of their experience, saying that he'd "treat you with just as much respect." Jay Wright stated about Konchalski's reputation, "There was never anyone coaches trusted more than Tom." John Calipari called Konchalski, "one of the best human beings I have ever come across in my lifetime." Mike Krzyzewski said of Konchalski, "the game of basketball is better as a result of Tom Konchalski." Krzyzewski also mailed Konchalski a card when the latter was in the hospital near the end of his life detailing Krzyzewski's admiration of him.

=== Awards and honors ===
In 2013, Konchalski was the subject of an ESPN documentary detailing his career. Following his death, Konchalski was posthumously nominated to the Catholic High School Athletic Association (CHSAA) Hall of Fame in 2022, the National Collegiate Basketball Hall of Fame in 2023, and the NYC Basketball Hall of Fame in 2024. In 2023, Konchalski posthumously received the John Bunn Award from the Naismith Memorial Basketball Hall of Fame, which commemorates an individual who has contributed significantly to the sport of basketball. Konchalski also had the Thomas C. Konchalski Foundation established after his death by his friends Dunleavy and Rohrssen along with his brother Steve. The foundation gives out scholarships annually, including a one-time $2,000 award to five students in the CHSAA who were associated with their school's basketball team. Following his death, Konchalski's typewriter was donated to Archbishop Molloy High School by Dunleavy, where it is currently displayed. In 2022, Konchalski's alma mater, Fordham, announced the first iteration of the annual Tom Konchalski Classic, a tournament which was later condensed into a single game honoring Konchalski's legacy.
