= Konchalski =

Konchalski is a surname. Notable people with this surname include:

- Steve Konchalski (born 1945), American-Canadian basketball coach
- Tom Konchalski (1947–2021), American high school basketball scout
