= Ben Kerner =

American basketball team owner (1914–2000)

- Born: June 9, 1913; Poland
- Died: November 22, 2000 (aged 87); St. Louis, Missouri, US
- Occupations: Businessman, sports-franchise founder and owner, basketball executive
- Years active: 1946–1968, as owner of NBA's Tri-Cities Blackhawks, Milwaukee/St. Louis Hawks
- Spouse: Ima Jean Bilbrey (1934–2011)

Ben Kerner (June 9, 1913 – November 22, 2000) was an American basketball team owner. He was the co-founder and owner of the St. Louis Hawks of the National Basketball Association, the present-day Atlanta Hawks. In 1946, Kerner co–founded with Leo Ferris a professional team in Buffalo, New York. The team then moved to become the Tri-Cities Blackhawks after a few games. Kerner moved the franchise from Moline, Illinois, to Milwaukee in 1951 and to St. Louis in 1955. His 1958 St. Louis Hawks won the NBA Championship.

== Ownership of the Hawks ==
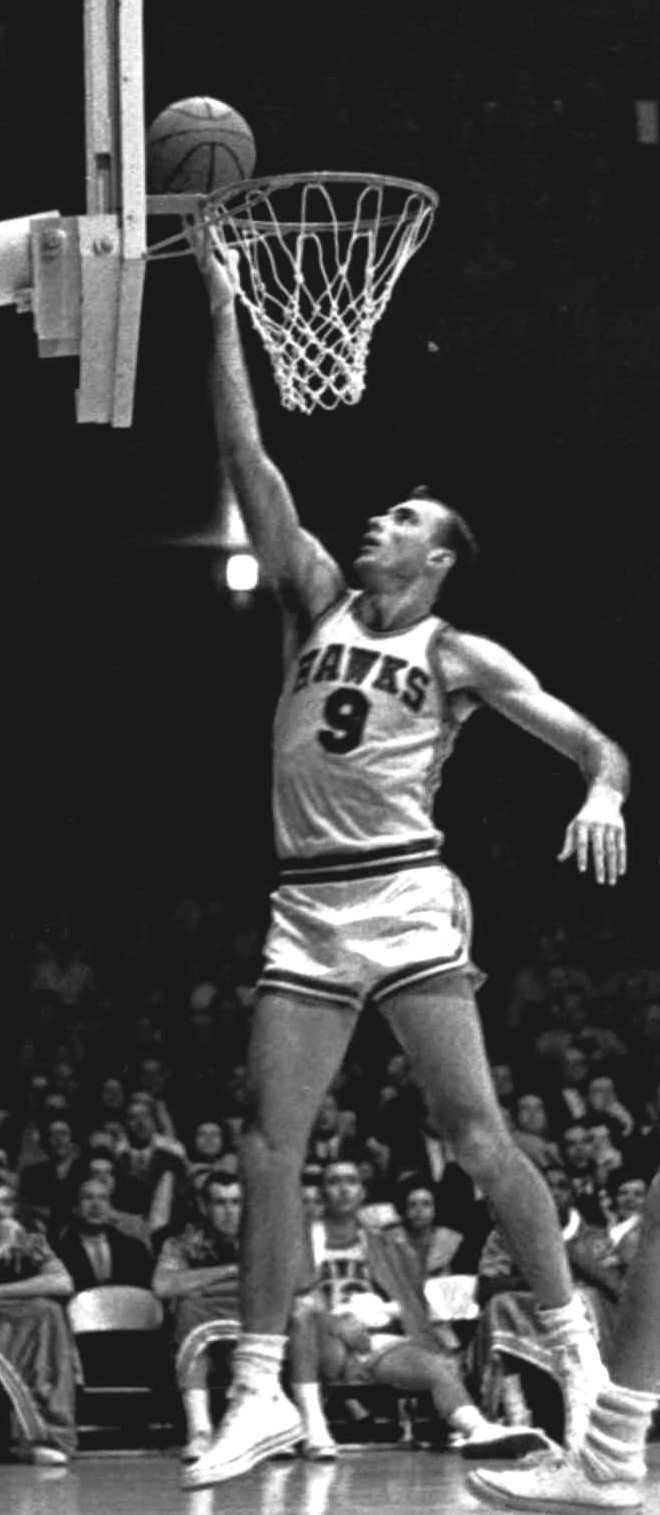
Bob Pettit in 1957

In 1946, along with business partner Leo Ferris, Kerner founded a professional team in Buffalo, New York. After a few games in Buffalo, the franchise relocated to Moline, Illinois, where the team began play as the Tri-Cities Blackhawks. Kerner served as both owner and general manager. The team played at Wharton Field House in Moline, Illinois. The facility is still in use today and is located at 1800 20th Avenue, Moline.

During the 1946–47 season, Ferris and Kerner added Pop Gates to the Buffalo/Tri-Cities team. Gates finished second on the team in scoring, behind 1948 NBL MVP Don Otten. A Naismith Memorial Basketball Hall of Fame player, Gates was a factor in integrating the league and the first African–American coach in a major league when he coached the 1948 Dayton Rens.

In 1949, Kerner hired eventual Naismith Hall of Fame coach Red Auerbach as coach of the Tri-Cities Blackhawks. The 1949–50 Blackhawks were 28–29 when Auerbach quit after discovering Kerner had traded a player without consulting him. Auerbach became coach the Boston Celtics for the 1950–51 season and won nine NBA championships with the Celtics, facing off with Kerner owned teams in the NBA Finals on multiple occasions.

In the 1950 NBA draft, Kerner drafted Naismith Hall of Fame player Bob Cousy with the fourth overall selection. Kerner eventually traded Cousy to the Chicago Stags without playing a game for the Tri-Cities. Cousy, reportedly unhappy to go to a small-town area, wanted $10,000 to sign with the Blackhawks. Kerner countered with $6,000 before trading him to the Stags on May 21, 1950, for Frankie Brian. Cousy never played for Chicago and landed in Boston, playing for Auerbach after the Stags folded. Cousy played in 13 consecutive All-Star games and won six NBA Championships with the Celtics.

After the 1950–51 season, Kerner moved the Tri-Cities Blackhawks to Milwaukee, Wisconsin, where they became the Milwaukee Hawks and moving from Wharton Field House to the larger Milwaukee Arena. Today, the arena is used by the UW-Milwaukee Panthers and has been renamed the UW–Milwaukee Panther Arena. The address is 400 West Kilbourn Avenue, Milwaukee.

Kerner drafted Hall of Fame player Bob Pettit in the first round (number two) of the 1954 NBA draft and Pettit became the cornerstone of the franchise. Pettit, who averaged 26 points and 16 rebounds per game over his career, was voted the NBA Most Valuable Player in both 1956 and 1959. At 6 feet 9 inches (206 cm), Pettit was a ten–time First–Team All-NBA member and retired as the all-time leading NBA scorer. His 16.2 per-game rebound average is third in league history, behind Bill Russell and Wilt Chamberlain.

In 1956, Kerner drafted Hall of Fame player Bill Russell as the second pick in the first round of the 1956 NBA draft. Kerner then traded Russell to the Boston Celtics for Cliff Hagan and former St. Louis University star Ed Macauley, both Hall of Fame players. Russell eventually replaced Auerbach as coach of the Celtics, winning two titles as player-coach.

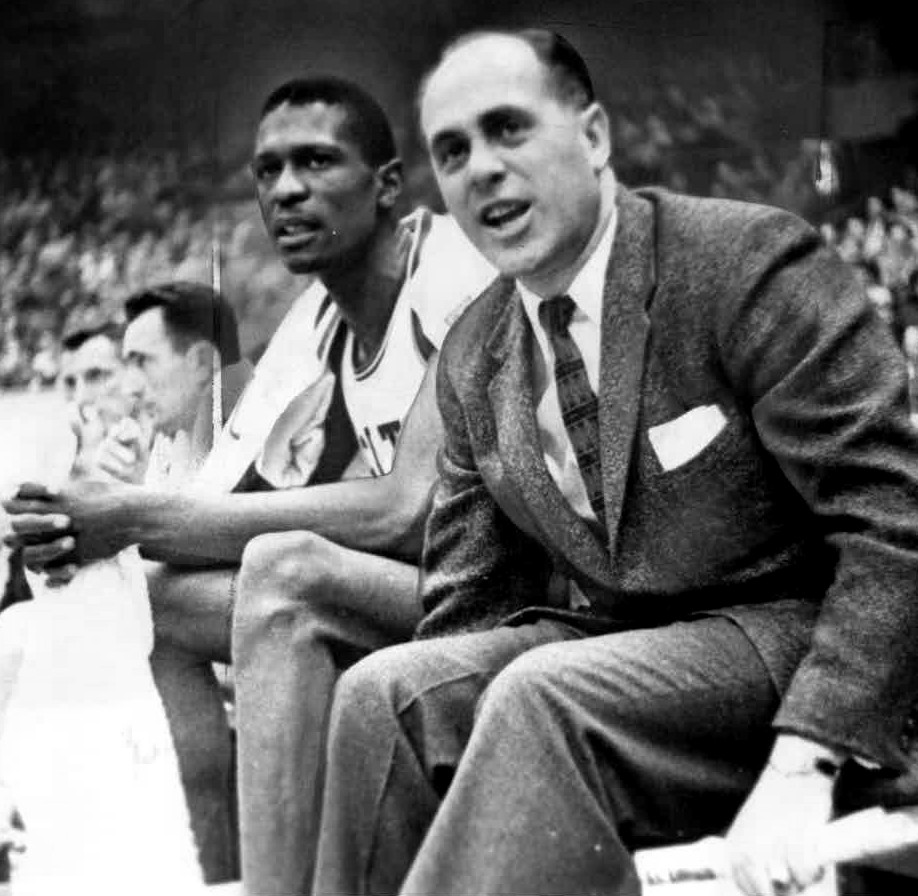
Bill Russell and Red Auerbach in 1956

From 1953–54 to 1956–57, the Hawks were coached by Hall of Fame coach Red Holzman. Holzman was replaced in 1956–57 by Hall of Fame coach Alex Hannum. Holzman later won two NBA championships with the New York Knicks. Hannum led the Hawks to the NBA championship before being fired immediately after the championship season.

Kerner had a number of ties to the Boston Celtics; he had employed Celtics coach Red Auerbach, drafted Bob Cousy and Bill Russell and obtained former Celtics Cliff Hagan and Ed Macauley. By the late 1950s, the teams had met three times in the NBA finals; Kerner's Hawks were built around four Hall of Fame players: Hagan, Macauley, Slater Martin and Bob Pettit.

The 1957 NBA Finals went to seven games as the Hawks lost to the Celtics' Auerbach, Russell and Cousy. During the finals, Auerbach and Kerner confronted each other on the court in a dispute over the height of the basket and Auerbach punched Kerner. Although he was not ejected, Auerbach was later fined $300 for the incident.

The 1957–58 season saw Kerner and the St. Louis Hawks (as coached by Alex Hannum, who went from player to player-coach in 1956) win the NBA Championship, as the Hawks and Celtics met in the Finals for the second consecutive year. This time the Hawks won, defeating the Celtics four games to two. Pettit scored 50 points in the deciding game, tipping in the final basket for a 110–109 victory in St. Louis. So proud was Kerner that he had championship rings made for the team. He did not retain Hannum as coach, instead going with Andy Phillip, who in turn was replaced weeks into the season for Ed Macauley.

In the 1960 NBA draft, Kerner and the Hawks drafted Hall of Fame player and coach Lenny Wilkens as the sixth pick of the first round. After retiring as a player, Wilkens coached for 32 NBA seasons and won over 1,300 games. The Celtics, still coached by Auerbach, and the Hawks (coached by Macauley) met for a third time that season. The finals went seven games, with the Celtics winning game seven 122–103 at the Boston Garden. Pettit averaged 25 points per game during the series. Kerner

In his tenure as an owner with a description as one with a "stubborn hand", he hired 16 head coaches in a span of 22 seasons. One of them was Paul Seymour, who was not so much fired by Kerner as pushed out by players who reportedly wanted the ball more over rookie Cleo Hill (who was black) to where Kerner forced Seymour to bench Hill. Seymour refused and got fired while Hill never played after the season ended.

=== Sale and move to Atlanta ===
By the late 1960s, the Hawks struggled to attract fans despite consistent teams. The peak years of tickets was a three-year span (1958–1961) that saw them average over 8,000 fans in three straight seasons. They played at Kiel but also occasionally at the larger St. Louis Arena. The Kiel (1401 Clark Avenue) was demolished in 1992 and the St. Louis Arena (5700 Oakland Avenue) was demolished in 1999. They averaged barely over 6,000 fans in the 1967–68 season, which saw them start the year at 16–1. So desperate was their attempt to generate interest that they played six games away from Kiel Auditorium in favor of Miami, Florida. 1967 saw the Hawks, already fighting for attention besides the baseball Cardinals football Cardinals (who relocated there in 1960) in sports interest, see the newly created St. Louis Blues play hockey (in 1968, the St. Louis Stars of the North American Soccer League arrived as well).

Playoff basketball did little to help matters, as reported attendance for the First Round (a shocking loss in six games) saw less than 6,000 fans attend for each game in St. Louis. On May 3, 1968, Kerner sold the St. Louis Hawks to Tom Cousins and former Georgia governor Carl Sanders for $3.5 million. The new owners moved the team to Atlanta, Georgia (a city that had seen the arrival of football and baseball in the span of three years) at the conclusion of the 1967–68 season, where they remain today, as the Atlanta Hawks. St. Louis has seen one professional basketball team since with the Spirits of St. Louis, who played from 1974 to 1976 in the ABA.

== Cultural influence ==
A book about the St. Louis Hawks by Greg Marecek, Full Court: The Untold Stories of the St. Louis Hawks, was published in 2006.

== Awards and personal life ==
Ben Kerner was born to Jacob and Helen Arbesman Kerner on June 9, 1913, in Poland. Kerner died on November 22, 2000, and is buried in Mt. Sinai Cemetery in Affton, Missouri. He had one sister, Sylvia Kerner Robinson. Kerner was married to Ima Jean Bilbrey on November 24, 1972, in Las Vegas, Nevada. He and his wife, had two sons: Ben Jr. and Kyle.

Ben Kerner was inducted into the Missouri Sports Hall of Fame in 1992.

In 2015, Kerner was inducted into the St. Louis Sports Hall of Fame.
