= Sam Schoenfeld =

American basketball pioneer (1906-1956)

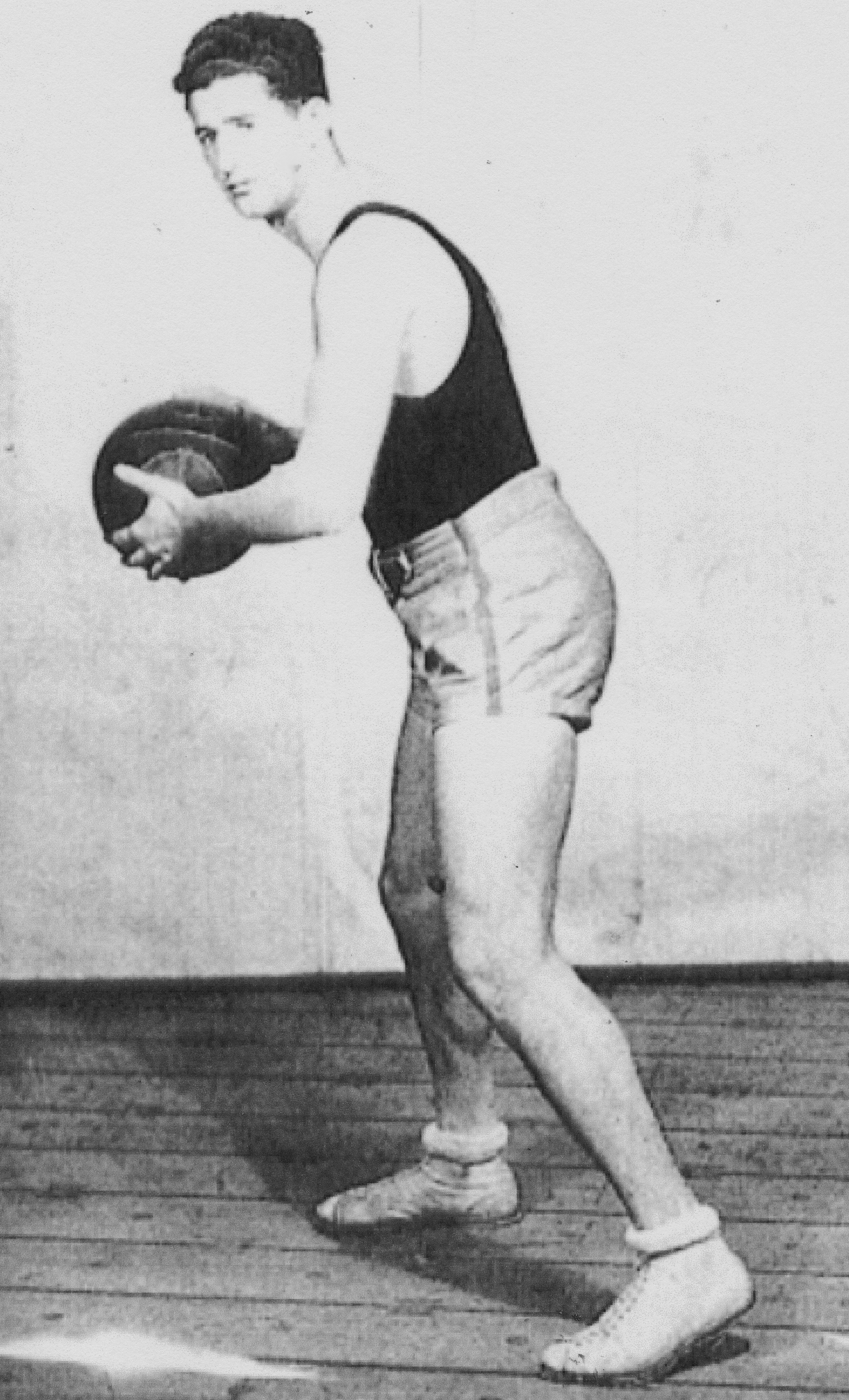
- Born: September 11, 1906; Williamsburg, Brooklyn, New York
- Died: March 2, 1956 (aged 49); Long Island Jewish Hospital, New Hyde Park, New York
- Occupations: Physical Education Teacher, H.S. Basketball Coach, Collegiate & Professional Basketball Player, Referee & Founded the CBOA.
- Known for: Contributions to the game of basketball as noted above.

Sam Schoenfeld (September 11, 1906 – March 2, 1956) was an early pioneer in the game of basketball.

== Early life and education ==
Sam Schoenfeld was born in Williamsburg, Brooklyn, New York on September 11, 1906. His parents Benjamin and Sarah were Austrian Jews. Originally named "Schuster", they changed their name to "Schoenfeld" when they immigrated to America. Benjamin was a kosher butcher. He died at age 37 in April 1913. Sam was the youngest of three children. He had an older sister, Jean ("Jenny"), and an older brother, Herman. Later, when Sarah remarried, she had another son, Jacob ("Jack").

Schoenfeld showed early aptitude for sports and especially loved basketball, even from a very early age. He was a star player at Commercial High School, later known as Alexander Hamilton High School; it no longer exists.

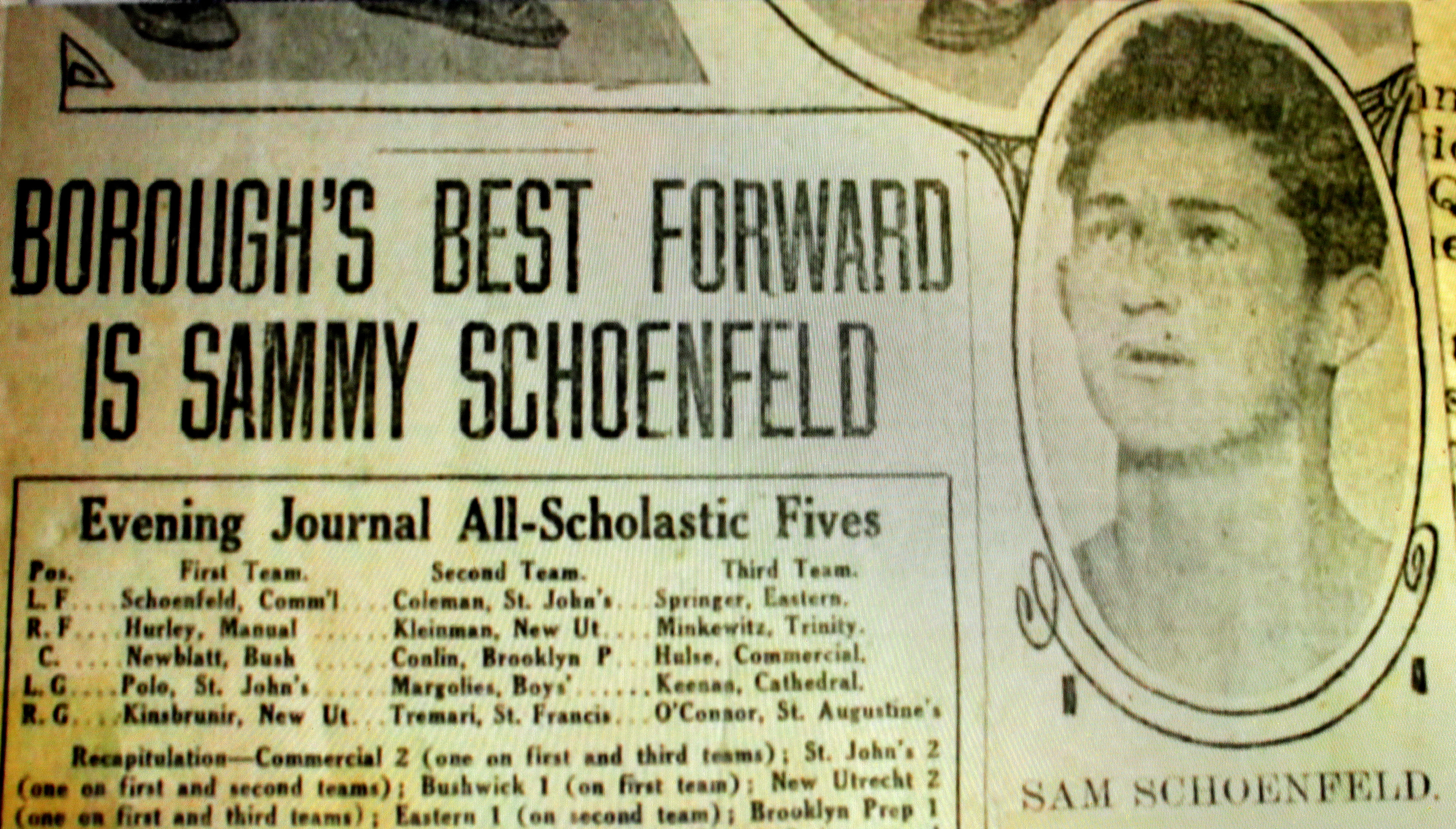
Commercial HS Star

He was named captain during his junior year. They lost only three games during his three years of high school basketball.

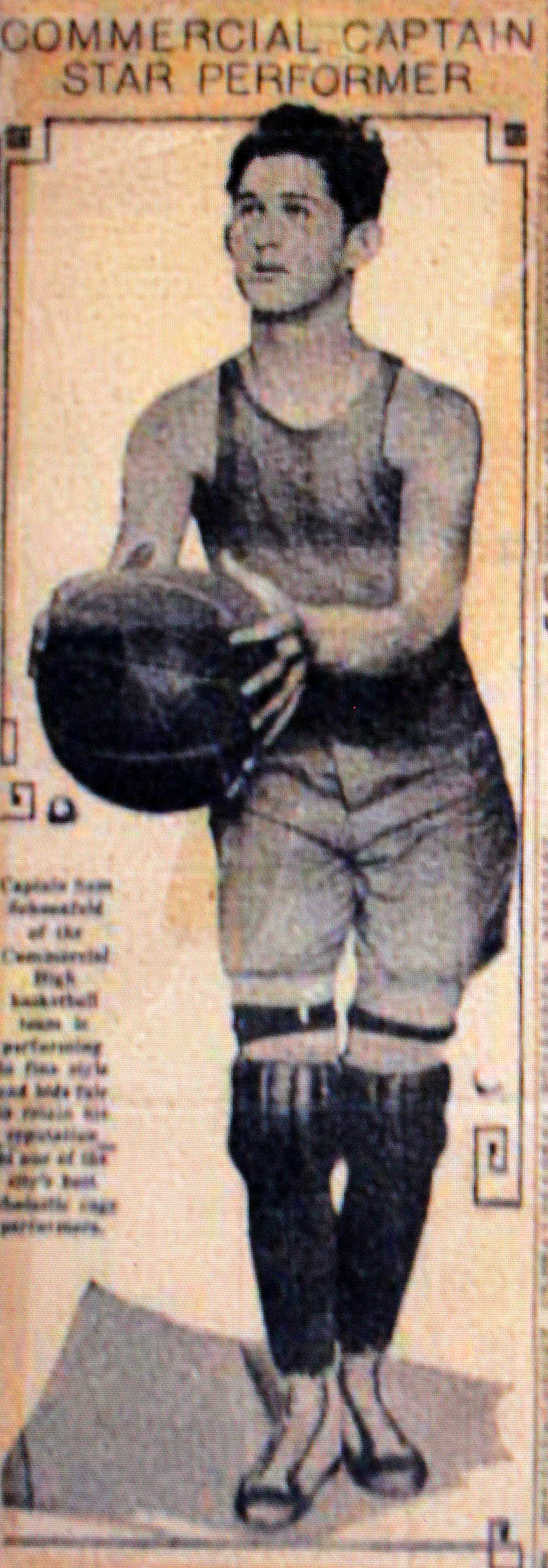

He attended the Savage College for Physical Education where he played basketball and was elected captain at the beginning of the 1927-28 season. During his time at Savage, the team compiled a record of 43 wins and 2 losses. His team had a run of 38 consecutive wins.

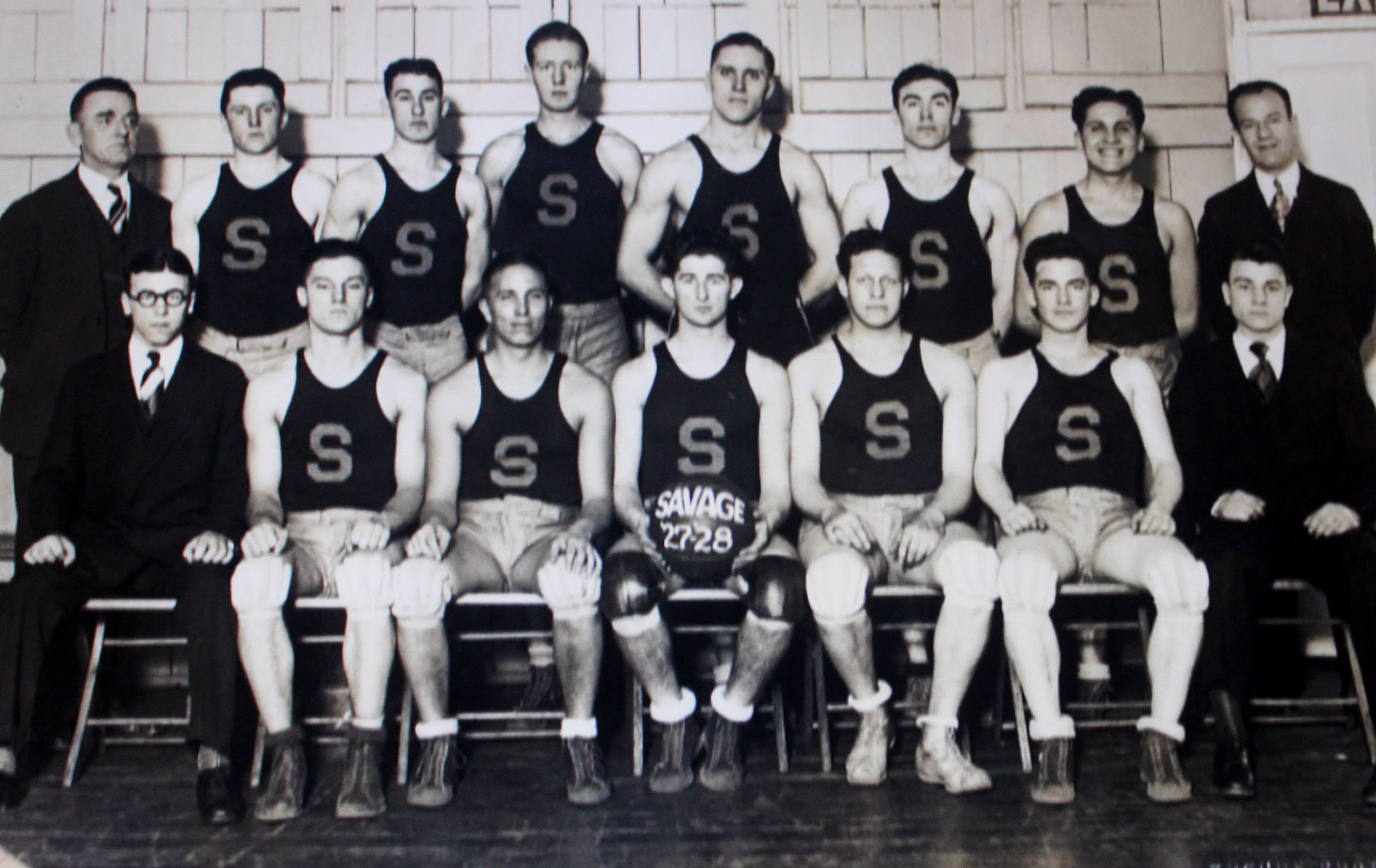
Captain of Savage Basketball Team

While attending Columbia's Teachers College in Manhattan, NY, "Sammy", played forward on the varsity basketball team alongside Lou Bender and George Gregory. Although mediocre his sophomore and junior year, by Schoenfeld's senior year with the addition of Lou Bender, the team won the Ivy League championship in 1930. It was the first coast to coast radio broadcast of a college basketball game over 45 stations nationwide. Columbia won the game. He and Bender were named first team All-Ivy League. He graduated in 1931.

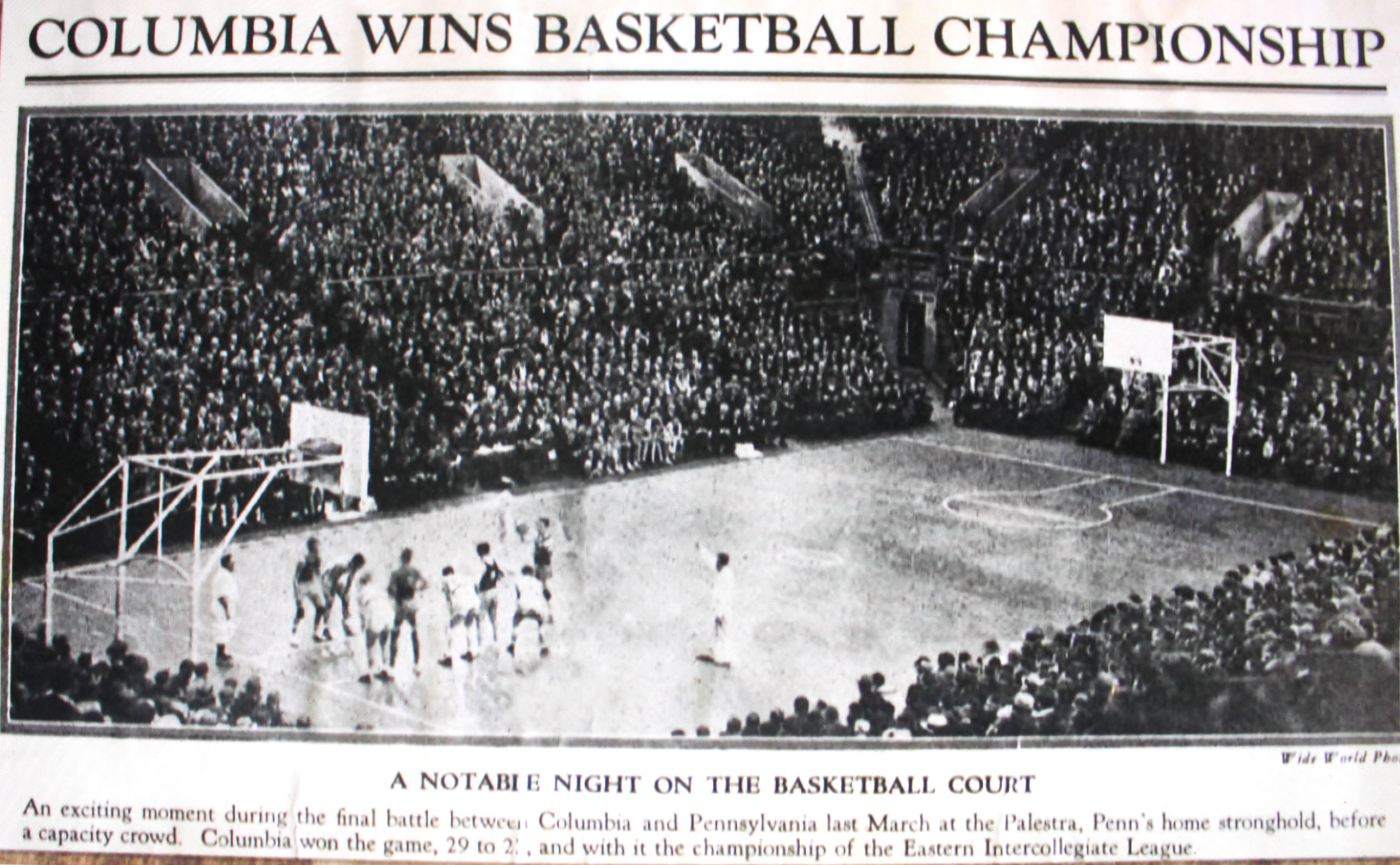
Columbia Wins Championship

== Career ==
=== Player ===
Sam played basketball at the high school, collegiate, graduate and professional levels. During the 1930s, he played for 5 teams in the American Basketball League, which was the primary professional basketball league in the Eastern United States.

=== Coach ===
Sam Schoenfeld was a basketball coach at Thomas Jefferson High School in Brooklyn. He coached the team to a first-place tie in the 1941–42 season and a divisional crown in 1942–43. In his 7 years as coach at Jefferson, his team lost only 7 league games.

=== Referee ===
In the 1930s and 1940s, Sam was among the top college referees in the nation. From 1946 to 1951, Schoenfeld was a referee for the National Basketball Association.

Sam Schoenfeld became the founder and first president (1948–50) of the Collegiate Basketball Officials Association.

== Other pursuits ==
In 1936 Sam began developing a prototype for the first full-size basketball stop-clock. The clock was tested at Thomas Jefferson High School and The Brooklyn Jewish Center, where he was Athletic Director for 25 years.

Schoenfeld was the co-founder and part owner of a coed sleepaway camp, called Camp Deerhead in Hancock (town), New York which provided a multitude of athletic activities for the campers. It was one of the first camps that constructed a hotel for the parents of the campers.

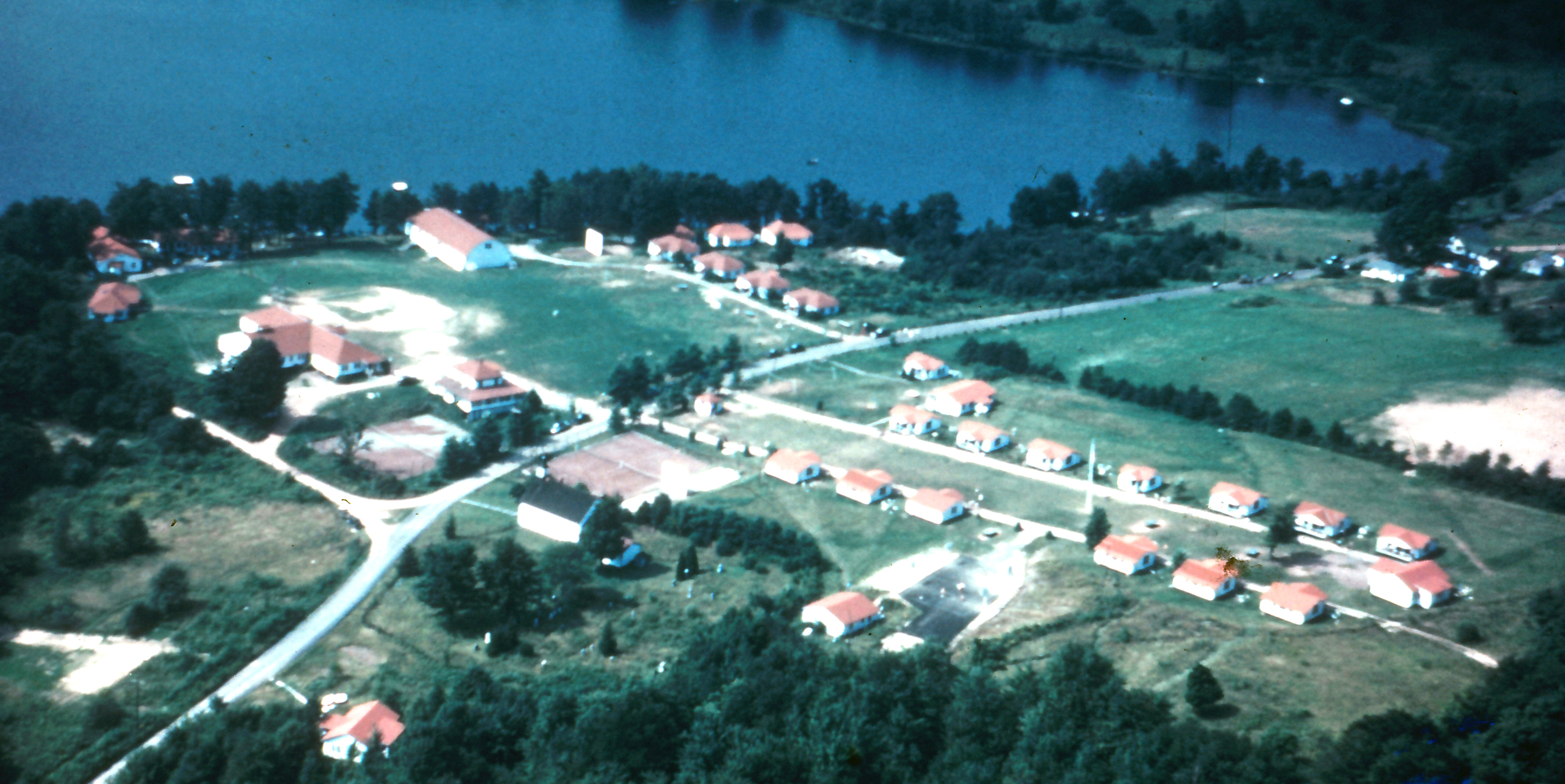
Camp Deerhead Partial Aerial View

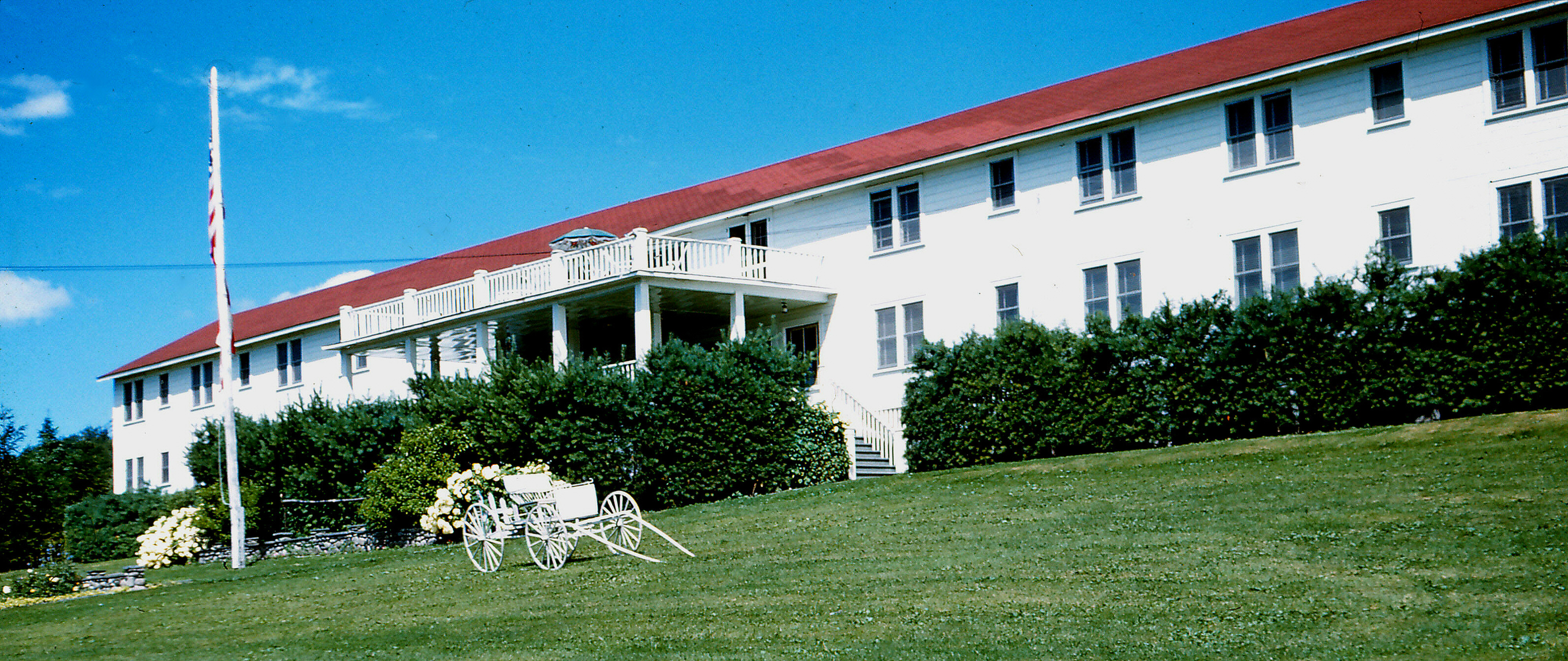
Deerhead Guest House

He was also a partner in the first Howard Johnson's restaurant in Brooklyn.

== Honors and awards ==
Known for his character, "impeccable honesty", and integrity, Schoenfeld was honored by the CBOA when it designated an annual award in his name, beginning the year of his death in 1956. "The Schoenfeld Sportsmanship Award is the highest honor that CBOA annually bestows on any collegiate institution." The award has been henceforth given annually to the coach and college which best exemplify "the highest degree of sportsmanship, character, and ethics among its players, coaches, and spectators in the conduct of its intercollegiate basketball games."

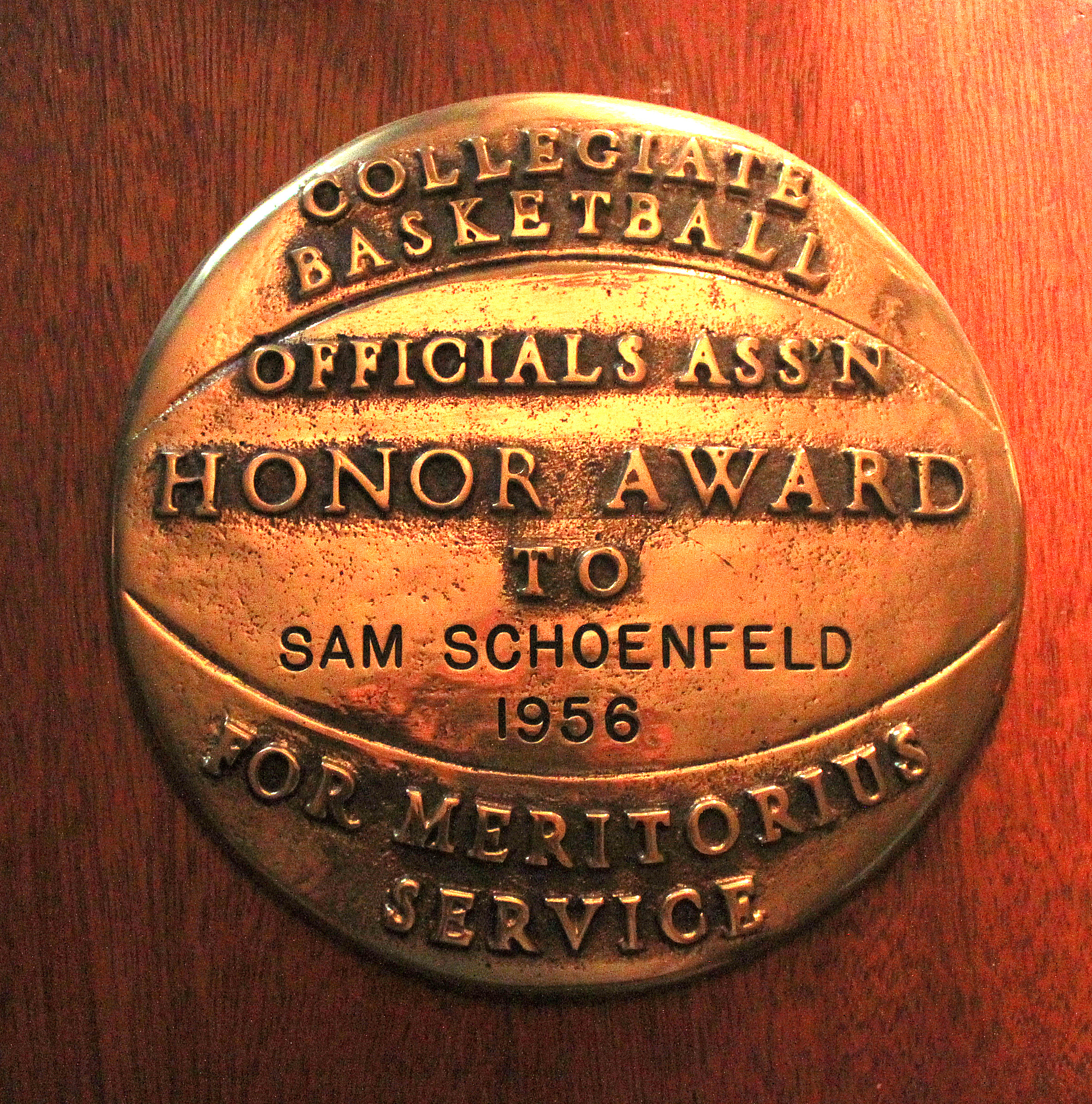
1st CBOA Award 1956

On September 24, 2009, Schoenfeld was posthumously inducted into the New York City Basketball Hall of Fame in recognition of his contributions as a player to the game of basketball. He was qualified to be inducted in any of the four categories that they consider for induction (Player, Coach, Referee, and Contributor).

In 2011 a 40-minute sports documentary was made depicting Sam Schoenfeld's professional career including his induction into the NYC Hoops Hall. The Sam Schoenfeld Story. Sam Schoenfeld was one of the leading basketball players of his generation, and was compared favorably to Nat Holman, who was considered one of the best. He became one of the top high school basketball coaches in New York City history, and then went on to become one of the best college basketball officials as well.

The film premiered on Wednesday, June 1, 2011 at 7:30 p.m. at the Cinema Arts Centre, Huntington, Long Island. Attending the reception and discussion were the filmmaker, Matt Berkowitz, producer, Dr. Robert Schoenfeld (Sam’s son) and Stan Friedland, author.

== Personal life and final years ==
Sam and his wife had three sons: Dr. Robert ("Bob"), Ed, and Peter. After a battle with pancreatic cancer, Schoenfeld died March 2, 1956 at Long Island Jewish Hospital, New Hyde Park, New York.
