= Lloyd Daniels =

American basketball player (born 1967)

Personal information
- Born: September 4, 1967 (age 59) Brooklyn, New York, U.S.
- Listed height: 6 ft 7 in (2.01 m)
- Listed weight: 205 lb (93 kg)

Career information
- High school: Andrew Jackson (Queens, New York)
- College: Mt. SAC (1986–1987)
- NBA draft: 1988: undrafted
- Playing career: 1987–2006
- Position: Shooting guard
- Number: 24, 44, 25

Career history
- 1987–1988: Topeka Sizzlers
- 1988: Waitemata Dolphins
- 1989–1990: Quad City Thunder
- 1991: Miami Tropics
- 1991–1992: Greensboro City Gaters
- 1992: Long Island Surf
- 1992–1994: San Antonio Spurs
- 1994: Philadelphia 76ers
- 1995: Limoges CSP
- 1995: Los Angeles Lakers
- 1995: Fort Wayne Fury
- 1995–1996: Scavolini Pesaro
- 1996: Sacramento Kings
- 1996–1997: New Jersey Nets
- 1997: Fort Wayne Fury
- 1997–1999: Polluelos de Aibonito
- 1999: Toronto Raptors
- 1998: Galatasaray S.K.
- 1998: Idaho Stampede
- 1998–1999: AEK B.C.
- 1999: Sioux Falls Skyforce
- 1999–2000: Baltimore BayRunners
- 2000: Trenton Shooting Stars
- 2000: Long Island Surf
- 2001: Tampa Bay ThunderDawgs
- 2001–2002: Panteras de Miranda
- 2001–2002: Scafati Basket
- 2002–2003: Ovarense Basquetebol
- 2005–2006: Strong Island Sound

Career highlights
- All-CBA Second Team (1995); GBA All-League Team (1992); GBA All-Star Game MVP (1992); First-team Parade All-American (1986)
- Stats at NBA.com
- Stats at Basketball Reference

Lloyd Daniels (born September 4, 1967) is an American former professional basketball player. Nicknamed "Swee'Pea", he played five seasons in the National Basketball Association (NBA) with the San Antonio Spurs, Philadelphia 76ers, Los Angeles Lakers, Sacramento Kings, New Jersey Nets and Toronto Raptors.

== Early life ==
Daniels was born on September 4, 1967, to Lloyd and Judy Daniels. His mother contracted uterine cancer shortly after his birth and died when Daniels was aged three. His father subsequently turned to alcohol and disappeared from Daniels' life. Daniels was raised by his two grandmothers who lived in Hollis, Queens, and Brooklyn.

Daniels struggled with undiagnosed dyslexia, transferred high schools multiple times and played little prep basketball because of academic troubles. He honed his skills in playground games. Approaching his junior year of high school, Daniels became a national name when he was named the most outstanding player at the Five-Star Camp in 1985. Howard Garfinkel, the director of the Five-Star Camp, called Daniels "the best junior alive, dead, or yet unborn." John Valenti and Ron Naclerio wrote that Daniels was known for combining passing and shooting abilities.

Daniels played for an entire season at Andrew Jackson High School as a junior when he averaged 31.2 points, 12.3 rebounds and 10.3 assists per game. He was selected as a first team Parade All-American as a junior. Daniels received comparisons to Connie Hawkins and Kareem Abdul-Jabbar while being hailed by sportswriters as the best high school basketball player from New York City in two decades. Daniels dropped out of high school the day after his junior season ended.

== College career ==
Daniels attracted the attention of UNLV Runnin' Rebels head coach Jerry Tarkanian. He was ineligible to play in the National Collegiate Athletic Association (NCAA) so Tarkanian helped Daniels receive admission to Mt. San Antonio College to improve his academics. He played one game for Mt. San Antonio's basketball team but quit to focus on improving his reading proficiency.

On February 9, 1987, Daniels was arrested for buying crack cocaine from an undercover policeman. Although Tarkanian was known for taking in troubled players, this incident was too much even for him, and Tarkanian announced that Daniels would never play for UNLV. It later emerged that Daniels had first been led to UNLV by Richard Perry, who had been convicted twice for sports bribery. Perry's involvement resulted in an NCAA investigation that ultimately forced Tarkanian to resign.

Later one of Tarkanian's assistants, Mark Warkentien, became Daniels' legal guardian.

== Professional career ==
After a court-ordered rehabilitation stint, Daniels started his career with the Topeka Sizzlers of the Continental Basketball Association (CBA). He then signed with Waitemata in New Zealand. Both stints ended prematurely due to issues with drugs and alcohol so he voluntarily entered a rehabilitation program in Van Nuys, California, that was frequented by basketball players.

After recovering from a 1989 shooting that nearly killed him, Daniels returned to playing basketball in 1991 with the Miami Tropics of the United States Basketball League (USBL). The team was led by John Lucas II and doubled as a rehabilitation program for players with addictions. After a successful stint in the USBL and the Global Basketball Association (GBA), Daniels was invited to the San Antonio Spurs training camp in 1992 by new head coach Tarkanian. On July 21, 1992, Daniels signed a two-year contract with the Spurs.

Daniels played for six NBA teams: the Spurs, Philadelphia 76ers, Los Angeles Lakers, Sacramento Kings, New Jersey Nets, and Toronto Raptors. Daniels played for the Fort Wayne Fury of the CBA during the 1994–95 season and was selected to the All-CBA Second Team. He also played in Italy with Scavolini Pesaro during the 1995–96 season.

He also played overseas in Greece with AEK Athens BC and in Turkey with Galatasaray.

In October 2005, Daniels tried out for the Strong Island Sound of the American Basketball Association.

== Personal life ==
Daniels' nickname, Swee'Pea, is a reference to the Popeye cartoon character of the same name.

On May 11, 1989, Daniels was shot in the chest and neck during a drug-related shooting.

Daniels has three children. His son, Lloyd, played college basketball at Lubbock Christian University.

Daniels lives in New Jersey where he coaches AAU basketball.

== NBA career statistics ==
=== Regular season ===
Year	Team	GP	GS	MPG	FG%	3P%	FT%	RPG	APG	SPG	BPG	PPG
1992–93	San Antonio	77	10	20.4	.443	.333	.727	2.8	1.9	.5	.4	9.1
1993–94	San Antonio	65	5	15.1	.376	.352	.719	1.7	1.4	.4	.2	5.7
1994–95	Philadelphia	5	0	12.6	.333	.214	1.000	1.4	.8	.4	.0	4.6
1994–95	L.A. Lakers	25	15	21.6	.390	.267	.800	2.2	1.4	.8	.4	7.4
1996–97	Sacramento	5	0	5.6	.125	.182	—	.8	.2	.2	.0	1.2
1996–97	New Jersey	17	0	16.6	.330	.322	.833	2.3	1.5	.5	.2	5.4
1997–98	Toronto	6	0	13.7	.414	.222	.800	1.2	.7	.5	.3	5.7
Career		200	29	17.7	.403	.316	.743	2.2	1.6	.5	.3	7.1

=== Playoffs ===
Year	Team	GP	GS	MPG	FG%	3P%	FT%	RPG	APG	SPG	BPG	PPG
1993	San Antonio	8	0	9.3	.367	.143	.833	1.9	.3	.4	.0	3.5
1994	San Antonio	4	0	16.5	.400	.500	1.000	2.3	.8	.0	.3	5.5
Career		12	0	11.7	.380	.333	.875	2.0	.4	.3	.1	4.2
