= Archbishop Molloy High School =

Private school in Briarwood, Queens

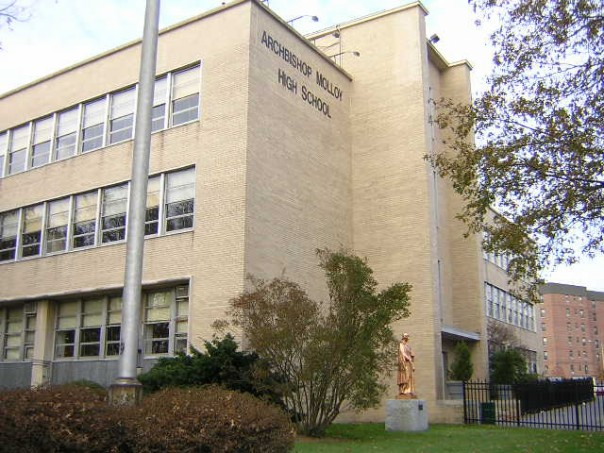

Location
- 83-53 Manton Street; Briarwood, Queens, New York City, New York 11435; United States; 40°42′40″N 73°49′11″W

Information
- Type: Private; college preparatory; day; Catholic school
- Motto: Non scholae sed vitae (Not for school but for life)
- Religious affiliations: Catholic, Marist Brothers
- Established: 1957; 69 years ago
- CEEB code: 332543
- President: Richard Karsten
- Principal: Darius Penikas
- Faculty: 100+
- Teaching staff: 70.0 (FTE) (2017–18)
- Grades: 9–12
- Gender: Co-educational
- Enrollment: 1,509 (2025–26)
- Student to teacher ratio: 22:1 (2025–26)
- Campus size: 6 acres (24,000 m^{2})
- Campus type: Urban
- Color: Columbia blue Dark blue Bright blue White
- Athletics: 15 interscholastic sports 46 interscholastic teams
- Athletics conference: Catholic High School Athletic Association (CHSAA)
- Mascot: Lion
- Nickname: Stanners
- Team name: Archbishop Molloy Stanners
- Rival: Monsignor McClancy Memorial High School
- Accreditation: Middle States Association of Colleges and Schools
- Publication: Out of the Box (literary magazine)
- Newspaper: The Stanner
- Yearbook: Blue and White
- Tuition: $13,200 + enrollment and technology fees (2026–2027)
- Website: www.molloyhs.org

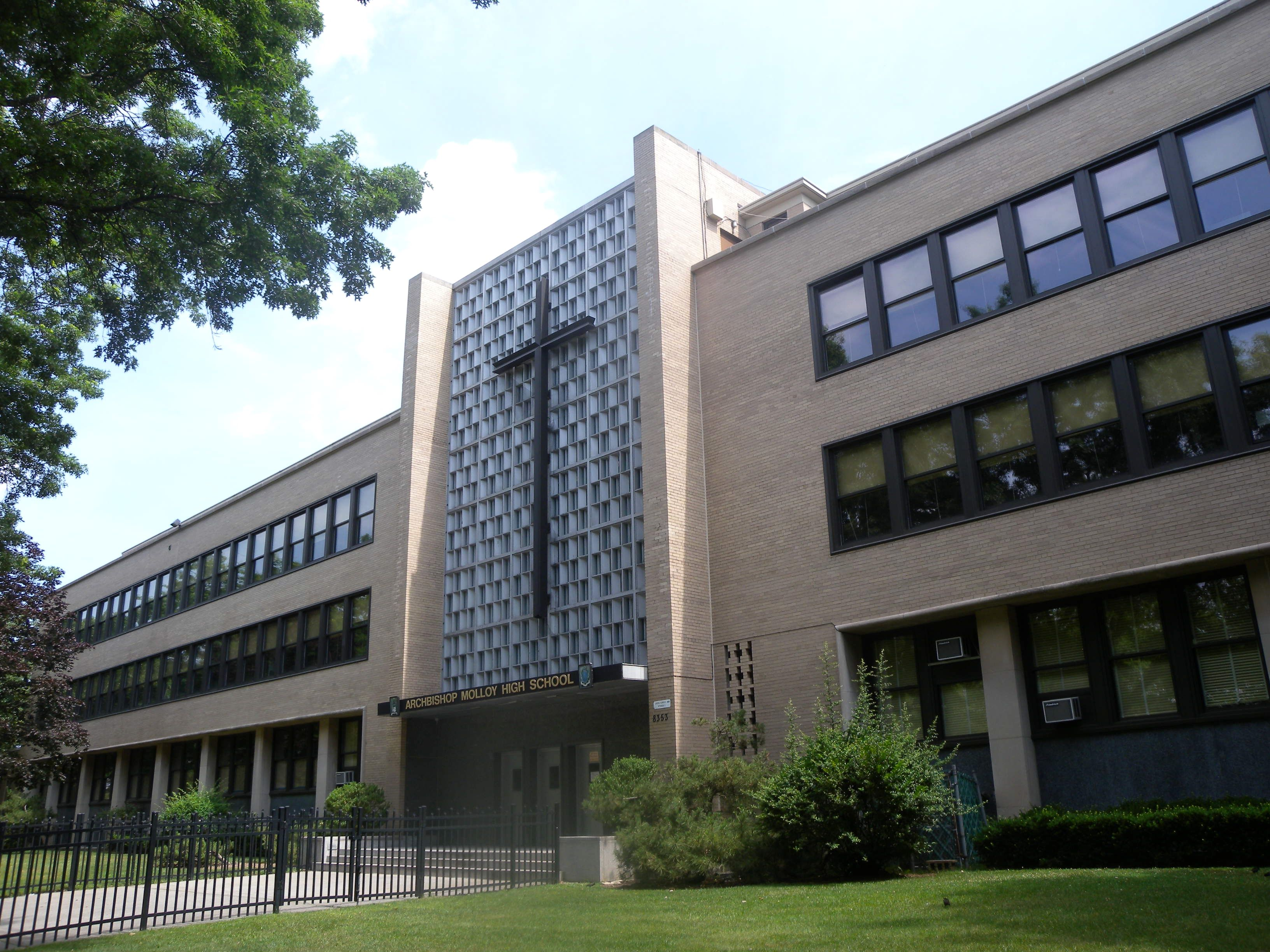

Archbishop Molloy High School (also called Molloy, Archbishop Molloy, or AMHS) is a four-year private, college preparatory, Catholic school for grades 9–12, located on 6 acres (24,000 m^{2}) on 83-53 Manton Street, Briarwood, Queens, New York. It is part of the Diocese of Brooklyn.

Molloy has an endowment of $11.3 million (as of 2019). The school's current principal is Darius Penikas, who started his term in 2015. Molloy's motto is "Non Scholae Sed Vitae," which is Latin for "Not For School, But For Life".

== History ==
The school is staffed by the Marist Brothers, founded by Saint Marcellin Champagnat.

In 1892, Br. Zephiriny opened St. Ann's Academy in two brownstone buildings at East 76 Street and Lexington Avenue. Initially a parish elementary school, the program expanded to include a two-year commercial course and then a four-year high school program. Initially conducted entirely in French, the school moved to English-language instruction, and by the 20th century, the Brothers anglicized the name to St. Ann's. During the Theodore Roosevelt era, the school briefly took on a military air, with uniforms and a marching band. Boarding facilities were added. When the original parish church was replaced in 1912 with the present-day church, the Brothers acquired the old building and converted it as a gymnasium. A purpose-built five-story school building was then constructed, and other neighboring buildings were acquired.

65 years after its foundation, the school enrollment was 800 in grades one through twelve, and all available buildings were full. Some of the earliest buildings had deteriorated structurally, and required replacement.

Archbishop Thomas Edmund Molloy, the Ordinary of the Diocese of Brooklyn, offered the Marist Brothers a 6-acre (24,000 m^{2}) site he had purchased in central Queens County. In 1957, the Brothers moved to the new site, naming the building in honor of Archbishop Molloy. The building received an award from the Queens Chamber of Commerce's annual architectural competition in 1957. The expanded facilities had the school nearly double its enrollment. In 1956, at the request of the Diocesan bishop, Archbishop Thomas E. Molloy, a high school in East Elmhurst was opened as Msgr. McClancy Memorial High School in honor of Msgr. Joseph V. McClancy's priestly, energetic, scholarly nature as he contributed so much to Catholic Education.

In 1987, the Ralph DeChiaro Center for Arts and Sciences was dedicated.

In 2000, Molloy became co-educational. It graduated its first coed class in 2004.

Richard Karsten, class of 1981, was appointed President of Molloy in July 2010. He served on the school's first director in the 1990s and is a member of the Stanner Hall of Fame.

=== Stanner ===
"Stanner" is a word created by Archbishop Molloy High School. Before modern-day Molloy was built in Briarwood, Queens, the school was named St. Ann's Academy. The students were known as "St. Ann-ers," a nickname which, over time, simply became "Stanners." All of Molloy's students, current and alumni, are known as Stanners.

Several things in the school have this name, including the school newspaper, The Stanner. The school's athletic teams are also known as the Stanners.

== Academics ==
The U.S. Department of Education recognized the school as a "National School of Excellence." Molloy was named as 1 of 96 most "Outstanding American High School" by U.S. News & World Report in 1999, as well as an "Exemplary School" by the United States Department of Education.

== Notable alumni ==
- Walter Signer (1928) - Former MLB player, Chicago Cubs
- Xavier Rescigno (1930) - Former MLB player, Pittsburgh Pirates
- Nick Tremark (1930) - Former MLB player, Brooklyn Dodgers
- Edward D. Head (1936) - 11th bishop of Buffalo
- Lou Carnesecca (1943) - St. John's Red Storm men's basketball coach in College Basketball Hall of Fame
- Charles J. Hynes (1952) - Brooklyn District Attorney
- Tommy Kearns (1954) - Former NBA player
- York Larese (1956) - Former NBA player
- Raymond Kelly (1959) - Former New York City police commissioner
- Peter Vecsey (1961) - Sports columnist and television analyst
- Tom Farrell (1962) - Bronze medalist, 800 metres, 1968 Summer Olympics
- Jim LeClair (1962) - Former AFL quarterback, Denver Broncos
- Steve Konchalski (1963) - Men's basketball coach at St. Francis Xavier University
- Louis Willett (1963) - War hero and Medal of Honor recipient
- Tom Konchalski (1965) - Men's basketball scout
- Jim Larrañaga (1967) - Men's basketball coach at University of Miami
- Kevin Joyce (1969) - ABA player and member of 1972 USA Olympic Basketball Team
- Charles Camarda (1970) - Astronaut, NASA space shuttle Discovery
- Vincent DeVeau (1970) - Writer and editor
- John Faso (1970) - Politician, Congressman, Republican nominee for Governor of New York in 2006
- Brian Winters (1970) - Former NBA All-Star and coach
- Vitas Gerulaitis (1971) - Former professional tennis player
- David Caruso (1974) - Film and television actor
- Frank DiPascali (1974) - Former CFO of Bernard L. Madoff Investment Securities
- John Sabini (1974) - Chairman of NY Racing and Wagering Board, former state senator and NYC councilman
- Andrew Cuomo (1975) - Governor of New York from 2011 to 2021, former secretary of housing and urban development
- Ray Romano (1975) - Actor and comedian (transferred before graduating)
- Mike Miller (1978) - New York state assemblyman
- Johannes Knoops (1980) - Rome Prize fellow in architecture
- Joseph Addabbo Jr. (1982) - New York state senator
- Tom Westman (1982) - Winner of Survivor: Palau
- Kenny Smith (1983) - Two-time NBA champion, television analyst for NBA on TNT
- Brian McNamee (1985) - Former strength and conditioning coach for New York Yankees and Toronto Blue Jays
- Cecil Gray (1986 - transferred) - Former NFL player
- Michael Grimm (1988) - Congressman, convicted felon
- Christopher Klucsarits (1988) - Professional wrestler
- Robert Werdann (1988) - NBA player
- Kenny Anderson (1989) - Former NBA player
- Kerry Keating (1989 - transferred) - Former basketball head coach, Santa Clara University; former assistant for UCLA and Seton Hall
- David Cancel (1990) - Entrepreneur
- Mike Jerzembeck (1990) - Former MLB player, New York Yankees
- Brian Scolaro (1991) - Comedian and actor
- Parry Shen (1991) - Actor
- Donn Swaby (1991) - Actor
- Dan Bongino (1992) - Former political commentator and congressional candidate; former NYPD and Secret Service officer; formerly the 20th deputy director of the FBI
- Brian Benjamin (1994) - Former lieutenant governor of New York
- Kawan Lovelace (1994) - Former Olympian triple jumper, 1996 Summer Olympics
- Vincent Piazza (1994) - Actor, Boardwalk Empire, Jersey Boys
- Chris Caputo (1998) - Head Coach, the George Washington University men's basketball team
- Mike Baxter (2002) - Former MLB player, New York Mets
- Chris Distefano (2002) - Comedian
- Gilberto Valle (2002) - Former NYPD officer convicted, then overturned, of conspiracy to kidnap
- Nick Derba (2003) - Former Minor League Baseball player; current head baseball coach, Maine Black Bears
- Sundiata Gaines (2004) - Former NBA player, New Jersey Nets
- Matt Rizzotti (2004) - Former Minor League Baseball player
- Rosalyn Gold-Onwude (2005) - Basketball analyst
- William Morrissey (2005) - Professional wrestler
- Russ Smith (2009) - Former NBA player
- Ashton Pankey (2010 - transferred) - basketball player
- Moses Brown (2018) - NBA player
- Cole Anthony (2019 - transferred) - NBA player for the Milwaukee Bucks
