= Danny Biasone =

American businessman (1909–1992)

- Born: February 22, 1909; Miglianico, Chieti, Italy
- Died: May 25, 1992 (aged 83); Syracuse, New York, U.S.
- Occupation: Sports manager

Daniel Biasone (born Dante Biasone; February 22, 1909 – May 25, 1992) was the founding owner of the Syracuse Nationals, an NBA team now known as the Philadelphia 76ers. Biasone, who was a childhood immigrant to the United States from Italy, was best known for advocating the use of the shot clock in basketball. Biasone was posthumously inducted into the Naismith Memorial Basketball Hall of Fame in 2000 for his contributions to the sport.

Although he did not originate the idea of a shot clock, he strongly supported its adoption in professional basketball. Biasone successfully lobbied the NBA to institute the shot clock in 1954. With Syracuse Nationals general manager Leo Ferris, Biasone was responsible for establishing the NBA shot clock at 24 seconds, where it has remained to this day. He supported the 24-second rule on the basis of his observations, experience, and basic arithmetic. Biasone asserted that basketball proved most exciting when it achieved a balance between stalling contests and wild shootouts. He envisioned a well-paced match-up in which each team took around 60 shots per game. Given that professional basketball games lasted 48 minutes, Ferris divided 2880 (the number of seconds in 48 minutes) by 120 (the total number of shots taken per game when each team attempted 60 shots) and arrived at a figure he considered optimal: one shot every 24 seconds. He was also a primary force in convincing the NBA to adopt the backcourt foul rule in 1953.

Biasone was featured in the book Basketball History in Syracuse, Hoops Roots by author Mark Allen Baker published by The History Press in 2010. The book is an introduction to professional basketball in Syracuse and includes teams like (Vic Hanson's) All-Americans, the Syracuse Reds and the Syracuse Nationals (1946–1963).
