= Red Sarachek =

American basketball coach

Personal information
- Born: October 19, 1912 Bronx, New York, U.S.
- Died: November 14, 2005 (aged 93) Deerfield Beach, Florida, U.S.
- Listed height: 6 ft 0 in (1.83 m)

Career information
- High school: Stuyvesant (New York, New York)
- College: NYU (1931–1933)

Career history

Coaching
- 193?–193?: Stuyvesant HS (assistant)
- 1942–1943, 1945–1969: Yeshiva
- 1948–1949: Mohawk Redskins
- 1948–1952: Scranton Miners

Career highlights
- As coach: NYSPBL co-champion (1949)

Bernard "Red" Sarachek (October 19, 1912 – November 14, 2005) was a basketball coach and athletic director at Yeshiva University in New York City from 1940 to 1969. He was also a mentor of legendary coaches such as Red Holzman (New York Knicks), Lou Carnesecca (St. John's), and Jack Donohue (Holy Cross). Yeshiva, under Sarachek, has been called "the birthplace of modern basketball" due to his innovative ball-handling schemes. Sarachek designed and implemented motion offenses, trapping defenses, plays to beat zone defenses and creative in-bound plays. His schemes were admired and copied by coaches around the country. "Red" was known to drive around in a car filled with envelopes with plays scribbled on them which he would give his team captains to figure out and pass to these future legends.

His story is featured in The First Basket, the first and most comprehensive documentary on the history of Jews and basketball.

In 1948-1949 Saracheck coached two of the top professional teams in what was known as the Eastern League at the same time. Legend has it that the two teams met in the playoffs and caused a new ruling barring the practice.

In inducting Saracheck into the NYC Basketball Hall of Fame as part of the inaugural class, the late David J. Stern, Commissioner of the NBA noted: "We all know "Red" as an innovative coaching mentor and a fiery and principled redhead - what many forget is that Coach Saracheck was the first coach to dare break the unwritten rule when, in 1949, as coach of the Eastern League champion Scranton Miners, he played "Pop" Gates, "Dolly" King and Eddie Younger - 3 African American superstars on the court at the same time!"

== Honors ==
- Yeshiva University Hall of Fame (2017)
- Jewish Sports Hall of Fame (1997)
- New York City Basketball Hall of Fame
- New York City Hall of Fame
