= Leo Ferris =

American sports executive and businessman (1917–1993)

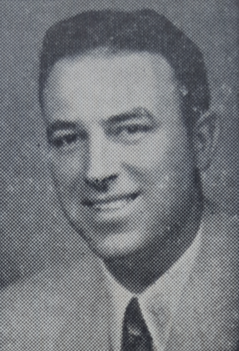
Leo F. Ferris

Leo F. Ferris (May 31, 1917 – June 1, 1993) was an American sports executive and businessman from Elmira, New York. He played a critical role in the birth of the National Basketball Association.

Ferris founded the National Basketball League's Buffalo Bisons, which after a series of moves survives today as the National Basketball Association's Atlanta Hawks. In 1946, as the Bisons' general manager, he signed the first African American player in the NBL, Pop Gates, several months before Jackie Robinson broke the color barrier in Major League Baseball.

In 1948, at age 31, he became president of the NBL; a year later, he negotiated the league's merger with the Basketball Association of America, which created the modern NBA. But he is perhaps best known as the primary inventor of the NBA's 24-second shot clock. He served as general manager of the Syracuse Nationals from 1949 to 1954.

== Managerial career in basketball ==
With Ben Kerner, Ferris founded the Buffalo Bisons, which played in the National Basketball League in 1946. The Bisons evolved into the Tri-Cities Blackhawks, based in Moline, Illinois, which eventually became the Milwaukee Hawks, the St. Louis Hawks, and finally today's Atlanta Hawks. He signed Pop Gates, the first African-American player in the NBL, on October 12, 1946.

"When Leo Ferris came to me, it was like a godsend," Gates was quoted as saying in the book Pioneers of the Hardwood: Indiana and the Birth of Professional Basketball. "It was a real highlight of my career to be accepted by the NBL as one of only two blacks in the league." (Dolly King was signed by the Rochester Royals a few days later.)

He later became NBL vice president and president and helped orchestrate its eventual merger with the Basketball Association of America, forming what would become today's NBA. Indiana sportswriter John Whitaker called Ferris the most influential owner in basketball, the "minister, ring bearer, best man" at what Whitaker described as "the shotgun wedding" that created the NBA.

The Syracuse Nationals' "recipe for success" began by recruiting Leo F. Ferris, then a talented team executive to reorganize the Syracuse team. Acting in capacity of NBL Vice President and then as general manager of the Nationals, Ferris first moves included signing Dolph Schayes, Al Cervi & Billy Gabor to the roster which put in place the core of the club that took three trips NBA Finals and captured the 1955 NBA title.

Concerns about a fan-unfriendly slow pace led to discussion of adding a shot clock to NBA games, adding possessions and excitement. Ferris and Danny Biasone — owner of the Syracuse Nationals, where Ferris was general manager — are often given credit for the selection of 24 seconds, though there is evidence Ferris may deserve the lion's share.

Ferris became the first general manager in basketball to organize celebrity halftime shows and brought acts like Bob Hope, Dean Martin, Jerry Lewis, Sarah Vaugh, Duke Ellington, and others to perform in Syracuse. Many of them provided halftime entertainment for the Syracuse Nationals home games. Ferris was successful boosting attendance and expanded the possibilities of the types of entertainment one could enjoy at a basketball game. "Get an attractive 'package', and put it within reach of the greatest possible number of customers. Satisfy the fans, and you have a steady, and increasing, following. That's what pro basketball is doing."

== Later career ==
Ferris left sports in 1955 and entered the real estate business. He died in 1993, at age 76 of Huntington's disease.

== Halls of Fame ==
Ferris has been nominated nine times to the Naismith Basketball Hall of Fame — in 2016, 2017, 2018, 2019, 2020, 2021, 2022, 2023 & 2024 by the Veterans Committee, but he has not yet been inducted.

Some have attributed the omission to the NBA considering itself a continuation of the BAA, not the NBL. The NBA uses the BAA's date of founding, June 6, 1946, as its own birthday, despite the NBL being founded in 1937 and the merger occurring in 1949. "It's sad and it's comical," Bill Himmelman, the NBA's former official historian, said of Ferris not being in the sport's main hall of fame.

Ferris is a member of three regional sports halls of fame: the Greater Syracuse Sports Hall of Fame, Chemung County Sports Hall of Fame, and the Illinois Basketball Coaches Association Hall of Fame.

In 2017, the Greater Syracuse Sports Hall of Fame produced an induction video detailing Ferris' career highlights.
