= Steve Konchalski =

American-Canadian basketball player and coach

Stephen J. "Steve" Konchalski (born April 11, 1945) is an American-Canadian basketball coach who served as head coach of the St. Francis Xavier University men's basketball team from 1975 to 2021. He was the head coach of the Canadian men's national team from 1995 to 1998.

== Career ==
A native of Elmhurst, New York, Konchalski played for coach Jack Curran at Archbishop Molloy High School before embarking on a college career in Canada in 1962. Acadia University's basketball coach Stu Aberdeen had discovered Konchalski at a tryout which was held at Archbishop Molloy High School in the spring of 1962. Konchalski guided Acadia to its first ever national title in the CIAU in 1965, setting single game highs 41 points and 17 field goals, while being presented with the Jack Donohue Trophy as the tournament Most Valuable Player. His career 1,479 points were more than any player had scored in the history of the program when he left. Konchalski graduated from Acadia in 1966 with a Bachelor of Arts and subsequently enrolled at Dalhousie Law School.

After law school, Konchalski landed his first coaching stint as coach of Acadia University's junior varsity team in the 1970–71 season. He was an assistant coach at Loyola College in Montreal for four years and in 1975 accepted the position as head coach of the St. Francis Xavier University men's basketball team. He coached the X-Men to national titles in 1993, 2000 and 2001, while receiving CIS Coach of the Year honours in 2001. During Konchalski's tenure, the X-Men made the national tournament 13 times. He was named Atlantic University Sport (AUS) Coach of the Year in 1983, 1991, 2000, 2001, 2003 and 2006 and coached StFX to AUS titles in 1981, 1993, 1997, 2000, 2001, 2002, 2004, 2005 and 2006. In November 2009, Konchalski became the all-time CIS leader in career wins with 736.

Konchalski was inducted into the Canadian Basketball Hall of Fame as a coach in 1993, the Acadia Sports Hall of Fame as an athlete in 1994, the St. Francis Xavier University Sports Hall of Fame as a builder in 2001 and the Nova Scotia Sports Hall of Fame in 2007. In 1999, he was the recipient of the Frank Baldwin Award for dedication to basketball in Nova Scotia.

In 2010, Konchalski received the Jean-Marie De Koninck Coaching Excellence Award, which is being given to an "individual who has made an outstanding contribution to university sport as demonstrated by long-term commitment and leadership as a coach at the local, provincial, national and/or international levels of Canadian university sport."

In November 2017, the main gymnasium at the StFX Oland Centre was named "Coach K Court" in honor of Konchalski. In March 2019, it was announced that he would retire in 2021 and that Tyrell Vernon had been hired to serve as an associate coach before taking over the head coaching job for the 2021–22 season. He ended his 46-year coaching career at St. Francis Xavier University with a total of 919 wins in 1495 games. After his final game in March 2021 it was announced that the annual exhibition X-Men Invitational tournament would be named the Coach K Invitational.

On February 17, 2022, Konchalski was appointed as Senior Advisor of Basketball Operations of the Newfoundland Growlers, a professional team competing in the Canadian Elite Basketball League (CEBL). On February 15, 2023, he joined CEBL's Calgary Surge as Senior Advisor.

=== National team ===
Konchalski was named assistant coach of the Canadian Men's National Team in 1973 and had that job until 1988, including the Olympic Games in 1976, 1984 and 1988, serving under Jack Donohue. As assistant coach, Konchalski helped Canada to fourth-place finishes at the 1976 and 1984 Summer Olympics and was also a member of the coaching staff at the 1983 World University Games where Canada captured gold.

Konchalski served as head coach of the Canadian Men's National Team from 1995 to 1998. He guided Canada to victory at the 1996 William Jones Cup in Taiwan. He later became a mentor coach with Canadian Junior National Teams, including the U19 squad that won gold at the 2017 FIBA Under-19 World Cup.

=== Private life ===
He and his wife Charlene have three children.

His brother Tom (1947–2021) was a longtime basketball scout at the high school level and publisher of the High School Basketball Illustrated magazine.

Steve Konchalski has been a close friend of Mike Krzyzewski for more than 40 years.

Preceded by Ken Shields	Canada men's national basketball team head coach 1995–1998	Succeeded by Jay Triano
