= Matt Rizzotti =

American baseball player (born 1985)

- First baseman
- Born: December 24, 1985 (age 40); Floral Park, New York, U.S.
- Bats: Left Throws: Left
- Stats at Baseball Reference

Matthew R. Rizzotti (born December 24, 1985) is an American former professional baseball player.

== Amateur career ==
Prior to playing professionally, Rizzotti attended Archbishop Molloy High School in Jamaica, New York, and then Manhattan College, with whom he played from 2005 to 2007. In 2005, he hit .416 with nine home runs and 57 RBI in 48 games. In 2006, he hit .340 with nine home runs and 43 RBI in 57 games, and in 2007, he hit .352 with 11 home runs and 43 RBI in 54 games. After the 2006 season, he played collegiate summer baseball for the Chatham A's of the Cape Cod Baseball League.

== Professional career ==
Rizzotti was originally drafted by the Minnesota Twins in the 46th round of the 2004 amateur draft, however, he opted not to sign. He was next drafted by the Phillies in the sixth round of the 2007 amateur draft and began his professional career that season.

With the Williamsport Crosscutters in 2007, Rizzotti hit .260 in 63 games. He played for the GCL Phillies and Lakewood BlueClaws in 2008, hitting a combined .278 with 10 home runs and 55 RBI in 106 games. In 2009, he played for the Clearwater Threshers and hit .263 with 13 home runs and 58 RBI in 101 games. He played for the Threshers, Reading Phillies and Lehigh Valley IronPigs in 2010, hitting .343 with 17 home runs and 76 RBI. He was named the Eastern League player of the month for June 2010.

He was traded to the Minnesota Twins before the 2012 season. On June 29, 2012 he was released by the Minnesota Twins. He was picked up by the Oakland Athletics on July 12 and was sent to their Double-A affiliate, the Midland RockHounds. He batted .307 with 5 home runs in the final stint of his career.
