= Lou Bender =

American basketball player (1910–2009)

Lou Bender

Louis "Lulu" Bender (March 8, 1910 – September 10, 2009) was an American basketball player who helped turn the sport into a popular success in New York City during the Great Depression and helped make Madison Square Garden a destination for the sport. Bender was a three-time All-Ivy League and two-time All-America in the early 1930s while attending Columbia University. After graduating from Columbia, Bender barnstormed with the Original Celtics and later played for a number of professional teams in the American Basketball League, the first true professional league and a predecessor of the National Basketball Association.

== Early life and education ==
While a student at DeWitt Clinton High School in the Bronx in the late 1920s, Bender connected on a long two-handed set shot during a game, prompting someone in the stands to shout, "Now that was a lulu of a basket." The nickname stuck and followed Bender to college and the pros. At Columbia College from 1930 until 1932, Bender joined teammates George Gregory and Sam Schoenfeld to Ivy League titles in both 1930 and 1931, leading the league with scoring averages of 9.8 and 9.6 points per game those seasons, in an era before the shot clock in which ball control often limited scores to the teens. He was named to All-Ivy, All-Met and All-American teams while playing for the Columbia Lions. After completing his undergraduate degree in 1932, Bender earned his law degree from Columbia Law School in 1935.

== Rise of basketball ==
While at Columbia, Mayor of New York Jimmy Walker organized a basketball tripleheader at Madison Square Garden in January 1931 to raise funds to benefit the city's unemployed during the Great Depression. In the three games, Manhattan College defeated New York University 16–14, St. John's University topped City College of New York by a score of 17–9 and Columbia beat Fordham University 26–18 with Bender's eight points topping the scoring charts. Attendance was excellent, with a record 15,000 fans attending the St. John's vs. CCNY game and the event raising $22,000 for relief. Over the next several years, Madison Square Garden became a destination for basketball play, with doubleheaders featuring teams from the local area and around the nation.

== Professional play ==
After finishing college, Bender barnstormed with the Original Celtics and played with American Basketball League teams such as the Union City Reds and the Boston Trojans, later finishing his professional career with the unaffiliated New York Whirlwinds.

In September 2008, Bender was inducted into the New York City Basketball Hall of Fame along with NBA stars Kenny Anderson, Sam Perkins and Rod Strickland, coach Pete Gillen and pioneer Eddie Younger.

== Legal career ==
He became a trial lawyer following the completion of his playing career. During the 1940s, Bender was an Assistant United States Attorney in the United States District Court for the Southern District of New York, where his legal activities included prosecuting members of the German American Bund. He moved on to become a criminal defense attorney for five decades, lecturing on the subject and writing such texts as Criminal Aspects of Tax Fraud Cases.

Both of his sons followed their father into the legal profession. His son, Michael, has served as an associate justice of the Colorado Supreme Court, being appointed by Governor of Colorado to the post on January 2, 1997. Bender's son, Steven, has been a prosecutor in Westchester County, New York

== Marriage ==
He and his wife, the former Jean Waterman, were married in March 1934 at New York City Hall, and took a honeymoon cruise on the Staten Island Ferry for 5 cents each.

== Death ==
A resident of Harrison, New York, before moving to Florida, Lou Bender died from cancer, aged 99, on September 10, 2009, at his home in Longboat Key, Florida. He was survived by his wife of 75 years, Jean, as well as two daughters, two sons, 11 grandchildren and four great-grandchildren.
