= Vincent DeVeau =

American writer and editor

- Born: New York City, New York
- Occupations: Writer, editor

Vincent DeVeau (born 1952), is an American writer and editor living in Dublin, Ireland.

He moved to Los Angeles, where he worked in the Hollywood film industry for a number of years. He is a member of the Directors Guild of America.

Between films, he spent an increasing amount of his time in Ireland, moving there in 1989 and beginning a second career as a journalist. He served as editor of Cara magazine from 1995 to 2001, and as editorial director of Smurfit Communications, then Ireland's largest consumer periodical publishing house, until the company was sold in 2004. He is the author of short stories and hundreds of articles for newspapers and magazines in Ireland and the U.S. A number of his radio broadcasts for Raidió Teilifís Éireann have been collected in A Living Word, and an edited version of his interviews with film director Fred Zinnemann has been published in Fred Zinnemann, Conversations with Filmmakers. He is currently an editor with the Irish Daily Mail.

DeVeau is a direct descendant of James Gerahty, a Dublin city councillor and barrister, and author of several influential pamphlets published during the crisis leading up to the Act of Union 1800, which created the United Kingdom of Great Britain and Ireland, including The Present State of Ireland, and the Only Means of Preserving Her to the Empire, in a letter to the Marquis Cornwallis. James Gerahty's law offices were located at 31 Holles Street in Dublin, the present location of the Holles Street Maternity Hospital, where DeVeau's son was born almost 200 years later.

His grandfather, George DeVeau, lent his name to a landmark U.S. Supreme Court case, DeVeau v. Braisted, in which Justice Felix Frankfurter wrote the unanimous opinion. The case is still frequently cited as a precedent in various actions involving states' rights and the regulation of interstate commerce.

His maternal grandfather, James Digby Gerahty, held a seat on the New York Stock Exchange, and was at various times a director of such companies as the DuMont Television Network and the First Colony Corporation.

He is also a grand-nephew of Digby George Gerahty (1898–1981), who, under the pen name Robert Standish, was a frequent contributor to the Saturday Evening Post and the author of many novels, including Elephant Walk (1949), which was made into a 1954 Paramount Pictures film directed by William Dieterle, starring Elizabeth Taylor, Dana Andrews and Peter Finch.
