= National Collegiate Basketball Hall of Fame =

Museum in Kansas City, Missouri

- Established: 2006
- Location: Kansas City, Missouri
- Coordinates: 39°05′54″N 94°34′50″W
- Type: College basketball Hall of fame
- Director: Kevin Henderson
- Website: Official site

The National Collegiate Basketball Hall of Fame, located in Kansas City, Missouri, is a hall of fame and museum dedicated to men's college basketball. The museum is an integral portion of the College Basketball Experience created by the National Association of Basketball Coaches (NABC), located at the T-Mobile Center. The hall is meant as a complement to the Naismith Memorial Basketball Hall of Fame, with a focus strictly on those who have contributed greatly to college basketball.

On November 17, 2006, the NABC honored around 180 players, coaches and other notable contributors to college basketball by inducting them into the founding class of the Hall of Fame. Oscar Robertson, Bill Russell, Dean Smith, John Wooden, and the family of James Naismith, were selected to represent the inaugural class.

The Naismith Memorial Basketball Hall of Fame in Springfield, Massachusetts has indicated it will help with the exhibits. The other interactive portions of the College Basketball Experience are called 'The Entry Experience,' 'The Fan Experience,' and 'The Game.' The NABC recently renamed the Guardians Classic college tournament the CBE Classic to help promote it.

== Inductees ==
Year	Coaches	Players	Contributors	Teams	Reference
2006	Phog Allen, W. Harold Anderson, Sam Barry, Ernest Blood, Jim Boeheim, Larry Brown, Jim Calhoun, Howard G. Cann, Clifford Carlson, Lou Carnesecca, Ben Carnevale, Pete Carril, Everett N. Case, John Chaney, Denny Crum, Chuck Daly, Everett Dean, Edgar Diddle, Bruce Drake, Clarence Gaines, Jack Gardner, Amory Gill, Marv Harshman, Don Haskins, Edgar Hickey, Howard Hobson, Henry P. Iba, Alvin Julian, Frank Keaney, George Keogan, Bob Knight, Mike Krzyzewski, John Kundla, Ward Lambert, Ken Loeffler, Arthur C. Lonborg, Pete Newell, Arad McCutchan, Al McGuire, Frank McGuire, John McLendon, Walter Meanwell, Ray Meyer, Ralph Miller, Lute Olson, Jack Ramsay, Adolph Rupp, Leonard Sachs, Everett Shelton, Dean Smith, Fred R. Taylor, John Thompson, Stan Watts, Roy Williams, John Wooden, Phil Woolpert	Kareem Abdul-Jabbar, Nathaniel Archibald, Paul Arizin, Richard F. Barry, Charles Barkley, Elgin Baylor, Walt Bellamy, David Bing, Larry Bird, William W. Bradley, Wilt Chamberlain, Krešimir Ćosić, Robert J. Cousy, Dave Cowens, Billy Cunningham, Bob Davies, Forrest DeBernardi, David DeBusschere, Clyde Drexler, Joe Dumars, Paul Endacott, Alex English, Julius W. Erving, Harold E. Foster, Walter Frazier, Joseph F. Fulks, Harry Gallatin, George Gervin, Thomas J. Gola, Gail Goodrich, Hal Greer, Cliff Hagan, Vic Hanson, John Havlicek, Elvin Hayes, Marques Haynes, Thomas Heinsohn, Bob Houbregs, Bailey Howell, Chuck Hyatt, Daniel Issel, Buddy Jeannette, Earvin "Magic" Johnson, Skinny Johnson, Donald Neil Johnston, K. C. Jones, Sam Jones, Edward Krause, Bob Kurland, Robert Lanier, Clyde Lovellette, Jerry Lucas, Angelo Luisetti, Bob McAdoo, Branch McCracken, Jack McCracken, Kevin McHale, Ed Macauley, Pete Maravich, Slater N. Martin, Dick McGuire, George Mikan, Vern Mikkelsen, Earl Monroe, Calvin Murphy, Stretch Murphy, Harlan Page, Robert Parish, Bob Pettit, Andy Phillip, Jim Pollard, Frank Ramsey, Willis Reed, Arnie Risen, Oscar Robertson, John Roosma, Bill Russell, Adolph Schayes, Ernest J. Schmidt, John J. Schommer, Barney Sedran, Bill Sharman, Christian Steinmetz, Maurice Stokes, Isiah Thomas, David Thompson, John "Cat" Thompson, Nate Thurmond, Jack Twyman, Wes Unseld, Robert P. Vandivier, Bill Walton, Bobby Wanzer, Jerry West, Dominique Wilkins, Lenny Wilkens, John R. Wooden, James Worthy, George Yardley	Clair Bee, Hubie Brown, John W. Bunn, Alva Duer, Wayne Embry, Harry A. Fisher, Dave Gavitt, Edward J. Hickox, Paul Hinkle, Emil S. Liston, Ralph Morgan, Dr. James Naismith, C. M. Newton, John J. O'Brien, Harold Olsen, Arthur A. Schabinger, Lynn St. John, Edward S. Steitz, W.R. Clifford Wells		
2007	Guy Lewis, Norm Stewart, Lefty Driesell	Austin Carr, Dick Groat, Dick Barnett	Vic Bubas		
2008	Jim Phelan, Nolan Richardson	Arnie Ferrin, Danny Manning	Billy Packer, Dick Vitale		
2009	Gene Bartow, Jud Heathcote	Travis Grant, Wayman Tisdale	Walter Byers, Bill Wall		
2010	Tex Winter, Davey Whitney	Christian Laettner, Sidney Wicks	Wayne Duke, Tom Jernstedt		
2011	Eddie Sutton	Ralph Sampson, Cazzie Russell, Chris Mullin	Joe Vancisin, Eddie Einhorn		
2012	Joe B. Hall, Dave Robbins	Patrick Ewing, Phil Ford, Kenny Sailors	Joe Dean, Jim Host		
2013	Gene Keady, Rollie Massimino	Bob Hopkins, Marques Johnson, Xavier McDaniel, Tom McMillen	George Killian, George Raveling	1962–63 Loyola Ramblers men's basketball team	
2014	Dale Brown, Gary Williams	Zelmo Beaty, Darrell Griffith, Grant Hill, Shaquille O'Neal	Howard Garfinkel, Glenn Wilkes		
2015	Don Donoher, Caesar Felton Gayles, Lou Henson	Rolando Blackman, Quinn Buckner, Ed Ratleff, Charlie Scott			
2016	Hugh Durham, Mike Montgomery	Mark Aguirre, Bob Boozer, Doug Collins, Lionel Simmons, Jamaal Wilkes			
2017	Bo Ryan	Tim Duncan, Cleo Hill, Scott May, Rick Mount, Paul Silas, John Stockton, Jay Williams			
2018	John Kresse, Danny Miles	Otis Birdsong, Sean Elliott, Sidney Moncrief, Sam Perkins, Marvin Webster, Paul Westphal			
2019	Homer Drew, Lute Olson, Rick Majerus	Calbert Cheaney, Shane Battier, Terry Dischinger, Ernie DiGregorio, Larry Johnson, Todd Lichti			
2020				1963–64 UCLA Bruins men's basketball team, 1965-66 Texas Western Miners men's basketball team, 1975–76 Indiana Hoosiers men's basketball team	
2021	Rick Byrd, Tom Penders	Len Bias, David Greenwood, Hersey Hawkins, Jim Jackson, Antawn Jamison, Paul Pierce			
2022	John Beilein, Jim Calhoun, Lon Kruger, Roy Williams	Richard Hamilton, Larry Miller, Frank Selvy, Jimmy Walker	Jerry Krause		
2023	Herb Magee	Johnny Dawkins, Tyler Hansbrough	Tom Konchalski		
2024	Jack Hartman	Dave Meyers, Sihugo Green, Lennie Rosenbluth, Wayne Estes, Sam Lacey, John Rudometkin, Tom Stith			
2025	None	None	None	None	
2026	Ted Owens, Tubby Smith, Jay Wright	Danny Ainge, Walt Hazzard, Glen Rice			

Each year several founding class members are honored at the induction ceremony:

- 2007: Kareem Abdul-Jabbar
- 2008: Charles Barkley
- 2009: Larry Bird, Magic Johnson
- 2010: Jerry West, David Thompson
- 2011: Bob Knight, James Worthy
- 2012: Clyde Lovellette, Willis Reed, Earl Monroe
- 2013: Elvin Hayes
- 2023: Mike Krzyzewski
