= Charles Granby =

American basketball player and coach

Charles "Chuck" Granby (October 22, 1934 – March 2, 2016) was a former NCAA Division I basketball player, and at the time of his retirement the all time winningest coach in the PSAL.

== Early life ==
He was born in October 22, 1934, in North Carolina. He later attended Morris High School (Bronx) and New York City Community College. He played basketball at Bradley University. While there he won a National Invitational Tournament title. He served in the US Army Medical Corp from 1956 to 1958.

== Coaching ==
He served as the coach at Andrew Jackson High School, which later became Campus Magnet High School. He won 24 division titles, and seven Queens crowns in 45 years of coaching. He won a city title in 1985. By the end of his 24 year career he had amassed 722 wins. He retired from teaching in 1996, but continued to coach. After he retired Jonathan Cooper became coach at Campus Magnet. He additionally coached at the Empire State Games. He was inducted into the New York City Basketball Hall of Fame in 2012.

== Personal life ==
Granby survived kidney cancer in 1976 and prostate cancer in 1993. He died in March 2016 at the age of 81. The cause of death was natural causes.

== Notable students ==
- Boo Harvey
- Kyle O’Quinn
- Robert (Tree) Cornegy Jr.
