= George Gregory (basketball) =

American basketball player

Personal information
- Born: 1906 New York, New York
- Died: May 11, 1994 (aged 88)
- Listed height: 6 ft 4 in (1.93 m)

Career information
- High school: Dewitt Clinton (The Bronx, New York)
- College: Columbia (1927–1931)
- Position: Center

Career highlights
- Consensus All-American (1931); 2× EIBL Champion (1930, 1931)

George Gregory, Jr. (1906 – May 11, 1994) was a basketball player for Columbia University. In 1931, he became the first black basketball player to be selected as an All-American as the 6-foot, 4-inch center leading the Columbia Lions basketball team. Born in New York City, he would later serve on the New York City Civil Service Commission and was active as a community leader in Harlem.

== Education and basketball ==
Gregory led the Columbia Lions to a championship in the Ivy League (then known as the Eastern Intercollegiate League) in the 1930–31 season, together with teammate Lou Bender, the team's first league title. By his senior year, Columbia was playing its games at Madison Square Garden, and finished the season with a record of 21–2. Gregory was selected to multiple All-American squads that season. Though he had a full scholarship at Columbia, Gregory worked as a red cap at Manhattan's Penn Station. After completing his undergraduate degree, he played semi-professional basketball, earning as much as $150 a year, while earning his law degree at St. John's University School of Law as a night student.

== Community activities ==
He became involved with the Harlem Center of the Children's Aid Society while he was still at Columbia. From 1931 to 1953, Gregory ran youth programs in northern Manhattan and in the Bronx. He helped establish the New York City Youth Board in 1947 and served on the Municipal Civil Service Commission from 1954 to 1968. He was chairman from 1950 until 1965 of the planning board covering Harlem in the office of the Manhattan Borough President, overseeing the initiation of $400 million in public projects undertaken in that period. He worked for the New York City Department of Environmental Protection from 1968 until his retirement in 1970.

== Death ==
Gregory died at age 88 on May 11, 1994, in his Manhattan apartment due to colon cancer. He was survived by his wife, Helen, as well as by a daughter and three grandchildren.
