= Ron Naclerio =

American basketball coach

Ron Naclerio is an American basketball coach and author. He coaches at Benjamin Cardozo High School. He is the most winning coach in the Public Schools Athletic League.

== Early life ==
Naclerio was born in 1958. Naclerio played baseball at St. John's University and later spent three years in the Chicago White Sox system. This included the Gulf Coast League White Sox.

== Coaching ==
Naclerio started coaching in 1981. In his first season he went 1-21. The second year he went 21–4. By 2011 he broke the record of wins by a PSAL coach when he reached 723 passing Chuck Granby. Eventually he reached 748 wins and counting. During this time he won two city titles.

== Author ==
Naclerio cowrote Swee'Pea and Other Playground Legends: Tales of Drugs, Violence and Basketball with John Valenti

== Notable players ==
- Duane Causwell
- Rafer Alston
- Royal Ivey

Daryll “Showtime” Hill
