= Jack Curran =

American baseball and basketball coach

- Born: John Joseph Curran; September 6, 1930; New York City, New York, U.S.
- Died: March 14, 2013 (aged 82); Rye, New York, U.S.
- Resting place: Saint Marys Cemetery, Rye Brook, New York, U.S. 40.996°N 73.681°W
- Education: St. John's University
- Occupation: Sports coach

John Joseph Curran (September 6, 1930 – March 14, 2013) was an American baseball and basketball coach. Curran was the head coach at Archbishop Molloy High School in Queens, New York City. Curran won more basketball and baseball games than any high school coach in the United States. He has been elected into nine different Halls of Fame.

== Early life and education ==
Curran was born on September 6, 1930, the son of New York City police officer Thomas Curran and Helen Curran, who worked in the New York City Police Commissioner's office.

Curran graduated in 1948 from All Hallows High School in the Bronx, New York City. He earned a bachelor's degree in English from St. John's University, where he became a pitcher of the varsity team.

Curran played minor league baseball in the Brooklyn Dodgers and the Philadelphia Phillies organizations.

== Coaching career ==
Curran began coaching in 1958 at St. Ann's Academy, which was later renamed as Archbishop Molloy High School. During his career at Archbishop Molloy, Curran won more basketball and baseball games than any high school coach in the United States.

Among his former players are the former NBA players Brian Winters, Kevin Joyce, Kenny Smith, Robert Werdann, and Kenny Anderson.

== Honors ==
Curran was named CHSAA Coach of the Year 25 times in baseball, 22 times in basketball, won city championships in three different decades.

He has been elected into nine different Halls of Fame, including the New York City Basketball Hall of Fame.

On February 8, 2008, the school community honored his 50th year as head coach of baseball and basketball by unveiling a mural of the coach "through the years" after a game vs. St. Francis Prep.
