= Dolly King =

American basketball player (1916–1969)

Personal information
- Born: October 19, 1913
- Died: January 29, 1969 (aged 55) Binghamton, New York, U.S.
- Listed height: 6 ft 4 in (1.93 m)
- Listed weight: 215 lb (98 kg)

Career information
- High school: Alexander Hamilton (Brooklyn, New York)
- College: LIU Brooklyn (1939–1940)
- Playing career: 1940–1952
- Position: Forward

Career history

Playing
- 1940–1941: New York Rens
- 1941–1946: Washington Bears
- 1944–1945: Rochester
- 1946–1947: Rochester Royals
- 1947–1948: New York Rens
- 1948–1949: New Haven
- 1949: Dayton Rens
- 1949: Mohawk Redskins
- 1948–1949: Scranton Miners
- 1947–1949: New York Rens
- 1949: Dayton Rens
- 1948–1952: Scranton Miners
- 1951–1952: Saratoga Harlem Yankees

Coaching
- 1964–1969: Manhattan Borough CC

William "Dolly" King (October 19, 1913 – January 29, 1969) was an American professional basketball and baseball player. He was one of a handful of African Americans to play in the National Basketball League (NBL), the predecessor of the NBA.

King was a multi-sport star at Long Island University during the late 1930s, playing basketball, baseball, and football. According to Clair Bee, King's coach in football and basketball, King once played an entire college football game and an entire college basketball game on the same day. After college, King played several seasons of professional basketball with the all-black New York Renaissance before Lester Harrison signed him to the NBL's Rochester Royals in 1946. King averaged 4.0 points per game in 41 games with Rochester and participated in the league playoffs.

He played in Negro league baseball from 1944 to 1948, spending time with the Homestead Grays, New York Black Yankees, and New York Cubans.

King died of a heart attack in 1969, aged 55.

In 1992 his legacy was honored by the basketball family of New York with his induction into the newly formed New York City Basketball of Fame where he is enshrined together with his Scranton Minors teammates William "Pop" Gates, and Eddie Younger as well as his primary coaches Claire Bee and Red Sarachek.
