= Pop Gates =

American basketball player (1917–1999)

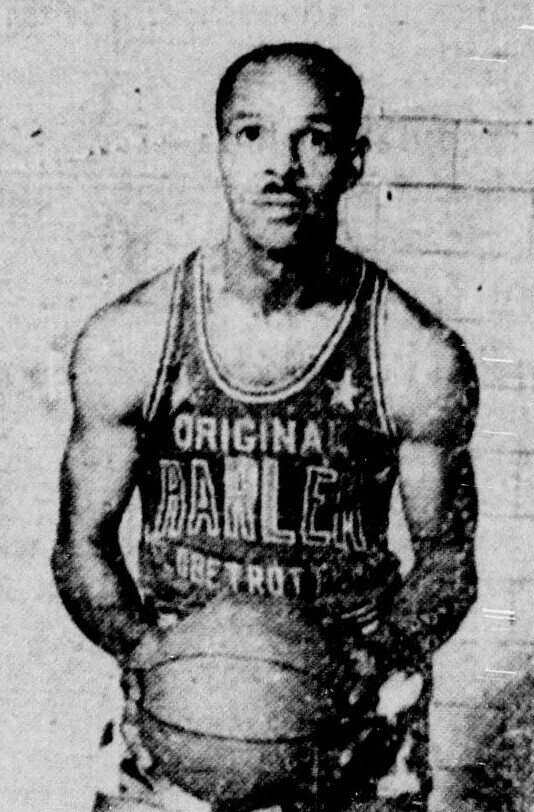
- Gates circa 1952

Personal information
- Born: August 30, 1917 Decatur, Alabama, U.S.
- Died: December 1, 1999 (aged 82) New York City, New York, U.S.
- Listed height: 6 ft 2 in (1.88 m)
- Listed weight: 205 lb (93 kg)

Career information
- High school: Benjamin Franklin (Harlem, New York)
- Position: Guard

Career history

Playing
- 1937–1938: New York Harlem Yankees
- 1938–1941, 1942–1946: New York Renaissance
- 1941–1946: Washington Lichtman Bears
- 1941–1944: Long Island Grumman Flyers
- 1944–1945: Rochester
- 1944–1946: Long Island Grumman Hellcats
- 1945–1946: Chicago Monarchs
- 1946–1947: Buffalo Bisons / Tri-Cities Blackhawks
- 1947–1949: New York Rens
- 1949: Dayton Rens
- 1949–1950: Scranton Miners
- 1950–1957: Harlem Globetrotters
- 1951–1952: New York Celtics

Career highlights
- NBL All-Time Team; 2x WPBT Champion (1939, 1943); 2× All-WPBT Team (1940, 1943); ABL champion (1950)
- Basketball Hall of Fame

William Penn "Pop" Gates (August 30, 1917 – December 1, 1999) was an American professional basketball player. Considered one of the top players of his day, he was among the first African American players signed to the National Basketball League, which through merger became today's National Basketball Association.

== Early life ==
Gates was born in Decatur, Alabama and attended high school in New York City. During high school studies he earned All-Conference honors in both 1937 and 1938 and made the All-City first team in 1938, as well as won three All-City titles with YMCA teams. Some later newspaper publications claimed that Gates graduated from Clark College (now Clark Atlanta University), but in fact his professional basketball career started right after graduating from Franklin High School.

== Basketball career ==
Gates started his professional basketball career with the famed New York Renaissance, beginning in 1938–39. Gates is one of the few athletes who went directly from a high school championship team (Benjamin Franklin, New York, 1938) to a world professional champion (New York Rens, 1939): in his first season with the Rens, the team won the 1939 World Professional Basketball Tournament in Chicago, the inaugural such event. Gates was the Rens' leading scorer in the championship game, won over the Oshkosh All Stars of the National Basketball League (NBL), a precursor to the NBA. Gates would play in all 10 of the editions of that tournament, both on all-African-American and racially integrated teams. He would twice be named to the World Professional Basketball Tournament First Team, including in 1943, when he led the Washington Bears, a team composed mostly of former Rens, to a second WPBT championship.

Gates played for the Buffalo Bisons/Tri-Cities Blackhawks in 1946-47 in the NBL, and later served as player-coach for the Rens, relocated to Dayton, when the team was added to the NBL during the 1948-49 season, the league's final campaign before merging into the new NBA. After the NBA did not admit the Rens into the new league, Gates and his Rens teammate William "Dolly" King joined the Scranton Miners of the American Basketball League, winning the league championship in 1949-50. Gates subsequently played for and coached the Harlem Globetrotters.

== Role in professional basketball's integration ==
Seven months before Jackie Robinson made his debut for the Brooklyn Dodgers, Leo Ferris helped usher in a new era of racial integration for professional basketball when he signed Pop Gates to his fledgling franchise, the Buffalo Bisons (later Tri-Cities Blackhawks) in October 1946. Gates was one of two prominent African-American players to join the National Basketball League (NBL) that year, along with fellow New York Ren and Washington Bear Dolly King, who joined the defending-champion Rochester Royals. (In the 1942-43 NBL season, with rosters depleted by World War II, a number of African-American players had played in the league, most prominently on the Chicago franchise, an integrated squad that included former Globetrotter stars Sonny Boswell and Bernie Price as well as 6'9" white center Mike Novak, who had starred in his college days for Depaul. But no African-American players had played in the league since.)

"When Leo Ferris came to me, it was like a godsend", Gates was quoted as saying in the book "Pioneers of the Hardwood: Indiana and the Birth of Professional Basketball." "It was a real highlight of my career to be accepted by the NBL as one of only two blacks in the league."

Despite the Buffalo Bisons moving from Buffalo, New York to Moline, Illinois (as a part of what was called the "Tri-Cities" area at the time)--a place that could be seen as having more problems with racial segregation at the time--Gates would still be one of eight players from that original Buffalo Bisons NBL team from 1946 to remain with the Tri-Cities Blackhawks by Christmas of 1946. The Blackhawks franchise continues to the present day as the Atlanta Hawks.

== Awards and honors ==
Gates was inducted into the Naismith Memorial Basketball Hall of Fame as a player in 1989.

== Career playing statistics ==
=== NBL ===
Legend
GP	Games played	FGM	Field goals made
FTM	Free throws made	FTA	Free throws attempted
FT%	Free throw percentage	PTS	Total points
PPG	Points per game	**Bold**	Career high

==== Regular season ====
Year	Team	GP	FGM	FTM	PTS	PPG
1946–47	Buffalo / Tri-Cities	**41**	125	60	310	7.6
1948–49	Dayton	40	**161**	**126**	**448**	**11.2**
Career		81	286	186	758	9.4
