= Jo Jo White =

American basketball player (1946–2018)

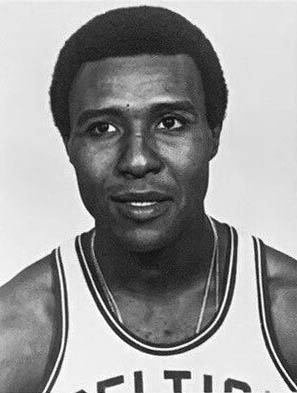
- White in 1977

Personal information
- Born: November 16, 1946 St. Louis, Missouri, U.S.
- Died: January 16, 2018 (aged 71) Boston, Massachusetts, U.S.
- Listed height: 6 ft 3 in (1.91 m)
- Listed weight: 190 lb (86 kg)

Career information
- High school: McKinley (St. Louis, Missouri)
- College: Kansas (1965–1969)
- NBA draft: 1969: 1st round, 9th overall pick
- Drafted by: Boston Celtics
- Playing career: 1969–1981, 1987
- Position: Point guard
- Number: 10, 12

Career history
- 1969–1979: Boston Celtics
- 1979–1980: Golden State Warriors
- 1980–1981: Kansas City Kings
- 1987: Topeka Sizzlers

Career highlights
- 2× NBA champion (1974, 1976); NBA Finals MVP (1976); 7× NBA All-Star (1971–1977); 2× All-NBA Second Team (1975, 1977); NBA All-Rookie First Team (1970); No. 10 retired by Boston Celtics; 2× Consensus second-team All-American (1968, 1969); No. 15 jersey retired by Kansas Jayhawks

Career statistics
- Points: 14,399 (17.2 ppg)
- Rebounds: 3,345 (4.0 rpg)
- Assists: 4,095 (4.9 apg)
- Stats at NBA.com
- Stats at Basketball Reference
- Basketball Hall of Fame
Medals
Men's basketball
Representing the United States
Olympic Games
Gold medal – first place	1968 Mexico City	Team competition
Pan American Games
Gold medal – first place	1967 Winnipeg	Team competition

Joseph Henry White (November 16, 1946 – January 16, 2018) was an American professional basketball player. He played college basketball for the Kansas Jayhawks, where he was named a second-team All-American twice. White was part of the U.S. men's basketball team during the 1968 Summer Olympics, winning a gold medal with the team.

In the 1969 NBA draft, White was drafted ninth overall by the Boston Celtics, with whom he would play for ten seasons, winning the NBA Finals in 1974 and 1976 and being named Finals MVP the latter year. A seven-time NBA All-Star, White set a Celtics record with 488 consecutive games played. White's No. 10 jersey was retired by the Celtics in 1982. In 2015, he was inducted into the Naismith Memorial Basketball Hall of Fame.

== Early life ==
White was born in St. Louis, the son of a Baptist minister, George L. White Sr. and his wife, Elizabeth Rebecca Guynn. As the youngest of seven children, he had three elder sisters; Shirley, Adlean, and Irene, and three elder brothers, George, Dewitt and Ronald. He started playing basketball at six and found sports to be a key platform for his community. As a child, he followed the St. Louis Hawks, and played on the basketball team at McKinley High School in St. Louis.

== College career ==
Due to his age, White was eligible to play college basketball a semester early at the University of Kansas, and team captain Riney Lochmann led a vote to determine that White would be welcomed by the players.

White joined the team in mid-season, enjoyed immediate success, and entered the NCAA tournament. They played dominantly but encountered a physical Texas Western squad, now known as University of Texas at El Paso, in the Midwest regional final. During the first overtime, White took and made a shot (a 35-foot runner) as the buzzer sounded, but he was ruled out of bounds by referee Rudy Marich. The team lost this thriller in the second overtime to Texas Western, who went on to win the championship. The game against Texas Western was featured in the 2006 film Glory Road, which was about the 1966 Texas Western team.

White became a leader of the team, and made the consensus NCAA All-American Second Team in 1968 and 1969. He made the All-Big Eight team the three subsequent years (1967–1969) Due to his early enrollment, White had only one semester of eligibility and Head Coach Ted Owens opted to have White play for the 18 games in the first semester rather than eight in the second. He graduated with a degree in physical education.

=== Olympics ===
After college, White played on the 1968 U.S. Olympic basketball team in Mexico City. The team was not expected to win the gold medal due to many future Hall of Fame players either declining to participate (e.g. Lew Alcindor, Elvin Hayes) or not being chosen (e.g. Pete Maravich, Calvin Murphy, Dan Issel). The U.S. Olympic Basketball Committee allocated four roster spots to the NCAA, two to the AAU (Amateur Athletic Union), three to the Armed Forces, one to Junior College (Spencer Haywood), and two to the NAIA (National Association of Intercollegiate Athletics). The American team, led by White and Haywood unexpectedly went undefeated (9–0), beating Yugoslavia 65–50 in the gold medal game. White described his reaction:

Going into the Olympic Games we weren't the overwhelming favorites to win the gold medal. We weren't even considered the strongest team in the tournament. That billing went to the Russians, who were upset by Yugoslavia in the semifinals. But we were the more determined team, and I think that's what set us apart.

This victory was the last in a streak of seven consecutive gold medals for the United States men's team.

== Professional career ==
=== Boston Celtics (1969–1979) ===
After the Olympics, White was drafted in 1969 in the first round (9th pick overall) by the NBA's Boston Celtics, who at that time had just won their 11th NBA title in 13 years. There was some reluctance during the time of the basketball draft as White had a mandatory two-year military commitment with the US Marine Corps. Then Boston general manager, Red Auerbach was able to shorten White's commitment and allow him to participate in the 1969–70 NBA season. He later stated that his short stint helped him prepare for his first Celtics training camp,

I was a Marine, so I had been through all the physical and mental challenges that comes with military training. Plus I was in excellent condition because of my military obligation, so I feel that this gave me an added advantage.

However, before White even reported to training camp, the Celtics' center and player-coach Bill Russell announced his retirement and cut ties to the organization. The Celtic's long-time shooting guard Sam Jones also ended his career, requiring White to replace those duties. With the sudden departure of Russell and Jones, White endured a rebuilding season during which the franchise experienced their first losing season (34–48) since 1950, the year before Red Auerbach was hired. White made the All-NBA rookie team during the 1970 season.

The Celtics got back on track by drafting Dave Cowens, trading for Paul Silas, retaining veteran John Havlicek, and hiring coach Tommy Heinsohn. With White leading the attack from the point guard position, the team returned to its winning ways in 1971. He was an All-Star for seven straight years from 1971 through 1977, finishing in the top ten in the league in assists from 1973–1977. In 1972, he participated in the now-defunct NBA One-on-One 16-man tournament where he reached the championship (which occurred during halftime of Game 5 of the Finals) and faced 6'11" Detroit Piston Bob Lanier, who used his eight-inch height advantage to win the $15,000 prize.

In 1974, White and the Celtics reached the 1974 NBA Finals. They faced the Milwaukee Bucks who were returning with their championship-winning core from the 1971 NBA Finals, including future Hall of Fame members Kareem Abdul-Jabbar and Oscar Robertson. With the Bucks' starting point guard, Lucius Allen, injured at the onset of the playoffs, White led a small, quick line-up featuring undersized, All-Star Cowens at center, to the first Celtics championship in the Post-Russell era. The following season, White led the Celtics in minutes in a season where they finished 1st in NBA Atlantic Division with a 60–22 record but lost the Eastern Conference Finals.

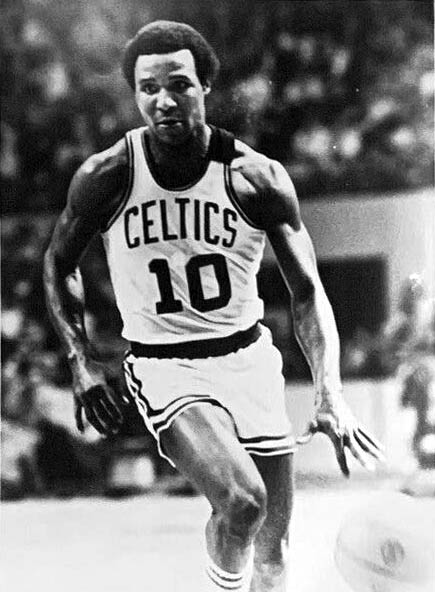
White with the Celtics in 1977

In 1976, White was part of a dominant Celtics squad which featured 5 veterans averaging double-digit scoring. During the playoffs, White led the Celtics to the NBA championship and was a starring player in what is often referred to as "the greatest game ever played" — Game 5 of the 1976 NBA Finals in NBA history. In the triple overtime win against the Phoenix Suns in game 5 of those finals, White was the game's high scorer with 33 points, had a game high 9 assists, leading the Celtics to a 128–126 win. Logging 60 minutes of play time, only the Suns' Garfield Heard (61) played more minutes. White was named the most valuable player of the 1976 NBA Finals.

White went on to become one of professional basketball's first "iron men", playing in all 82 games for five consecutive seasons during the 1970s and setting a franchise record of 488 consecutive games played. White suffered an injury during the 1977–78 season. With the end of the streak, White and the aging Celtics became a less effective squad and followed their championship with an exit from playoff semifinals in 1977 and then two losing seasons.

=== Golden State Warriors (1979–1980) ===
Unable to retain his all-star form following the injury, White was traded by the Celtics to the Golden State Warriors in the middle of the 1978–79 NBA season. Boston Globe writer Bob Ryan described the tension leading to the White's trade from Boston.

... being a Celtic, and, specifically, being a part of the Celtic mystique, meant a lot to Jo Jo White. In fact, being a part of the Celtics family and being able to come in and exchange quips with Red Auerbach and being able to identify oneself as a "Celtic" probably meant more to Jo Jo White than to any Celtic in the modern (i.e. post-Russell) era. Circumstances dictated that he leave, but leaving Boston was far from painless.

=== Kansas City Kings (1980–1981) ===
White retired as a player after 1981 with the Kansas City Kings.

== Coaching career ==
=== Kansas (1982–1983) ===
He returned to the Jayhawks as an assistant coach from 1982–83. In 1987 at the age of 41, White attempted a professional comeback as a player-assistant coach with the Topeka Sizzlers of the Continental Basketball Association.

== Legacy ==
The Boston Celtics retired White's#10, barring its future use among the team's players

On Friday, April 9, 1982, his number 10 was hung from the rafters at the Boston Garden. He was in the top 100 in the NBA for career total field goals made, field goals attempted, assists, free throw percentage, minutes per game, and defensive rating. He made the All-NBA Second Team in the 1974–75 and 1976–77 NBA seasons. White was director of special projects and community relations with the Celtics at the time of his death.

In 1991 White was welcomed into the Missouri Hall of Fame. He was also inducted into the Kansas Sports Hall of Fame. His jersey was retired by the Kansas Jayhawks in 2003. He was inducted in the Marine Corps Sports Hall of Fame with the class of 2009. He also joined the 2013 class of the St. Louis Sports Hall of Fame.

White was inducted into the Naismith Memorial Basketball Hall of Fame class in September 2015. He was inducted alongside his former coach, Tom Heinsohn, and was formally introduced into the Hall by fellow Celtics John Havlicek and Dave Cowens.

Previous to his induction in 2015, White's long exclusion from the Basketball Hall of Fame was a common topic when discussing players who have long been eligible but have not been inducted, with most writers believing his entry has been long delayed. One writer in 2012 went as far as to declare a Jo Jo White Threshold as a marker for viability among future candidates.

== Personal life ==
=== Family ===
White had six older brothers and sisters. He was married twice, secondly to Deborah White and previously to Estelle Bowser. The retired Major League Baseball player Chris Chambliss was a cousin of White's. In 1985, White moved to Rochester, NY where he owned and operated a couple of McDonald's restaurants until the early 1990s. In 2009, White and his wife opened a restaurant, JoJo's West, in Maynard, Massachusetts, which declared bankruptcy and closed in 2010 with criminal allegations and litigation against restaurant partner Chris Barnes.

=== In media ===
White appeared in two movies with small roles: 1980's Inside Moves and 2007's The Game Plan, in which his son, actor Brian J. White, also starred. His controversial 1966 NCAA Tournament Elite 8 game against Texas Western is portrayed in the 2006 film Glory Road.

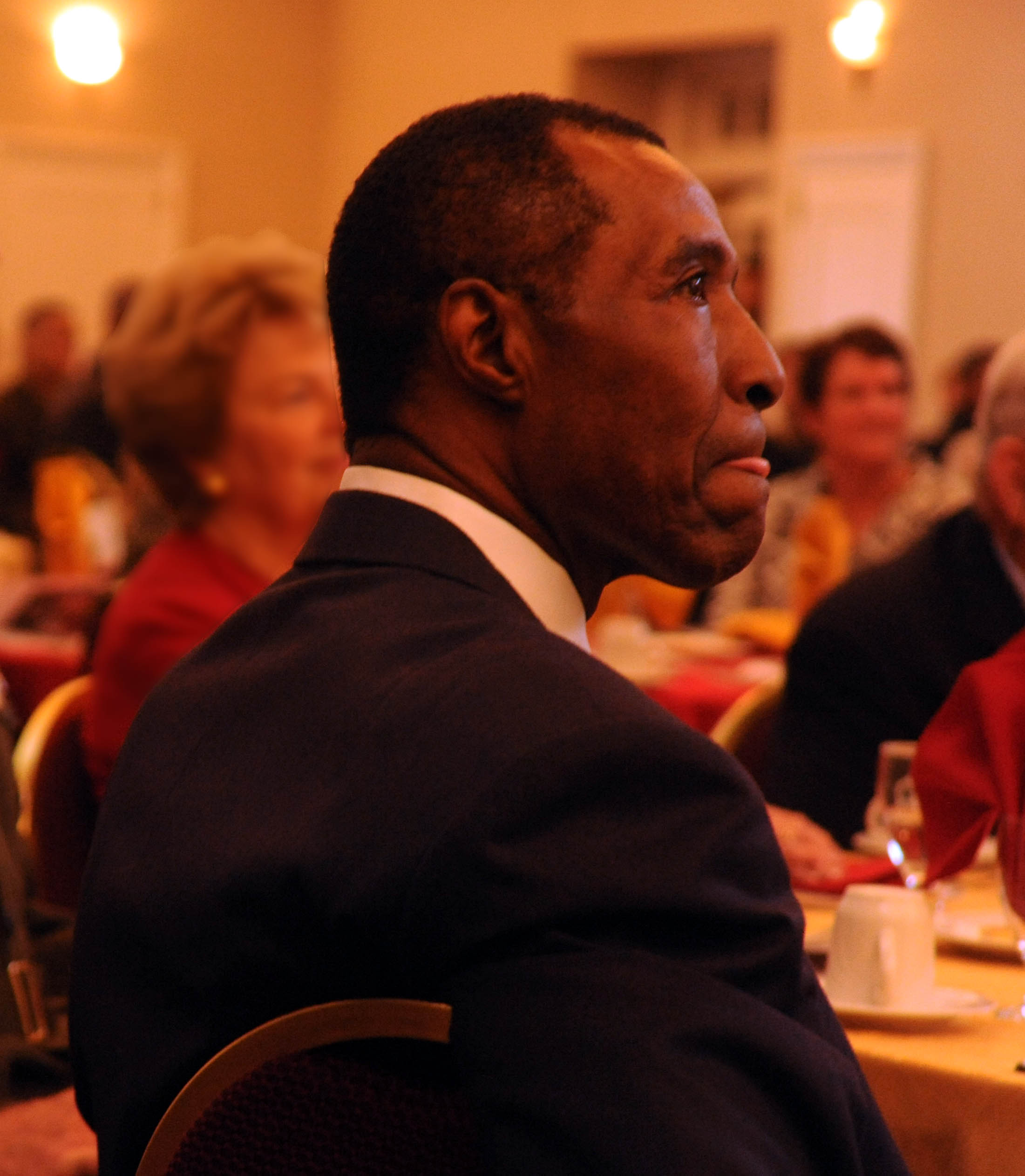
White during a Marine Corps Sports Hall of Fame induction ceremony in April 2008

In 2010, White underwent a procedure to remove a tumor on the back of his brain. To assist his recovery, his attorney elicited memories from White and authored a subsequent biography Make it Count that was released in 2012. Then–Boston Celtics Coach Doc Rivers remarked:

When you saw him the first couple of times you were extremely worried. But we jokingly said that JoJo could make sick cool. He really is a cool dude and a great human being.

In September 2012, White started the Jo Jo White Foundation to provide support for brain cancer research. He also previously led the Jo Jo White Growth League for children in middle school starting in 1994.

=== Death ===
White died in Boston two months past his 71st birthday, from complications of his dementia, specifically pneumonia, which was brought on when he had a benign brain tumor removed. The Boston Celtics honored his death with a black stripe stitched onto their jerseys for the remainder of the 2017–18 season.

== Career statistics ==
=== NBA ===
Legend
GP	Games played	GS	Games started	MPG	Minutes per game
FG%	Field goal percentage	3P%	3-point field goal percentage	FT%	Free throw percentage
RPG	Rebounds per game	APG	Assists per game	SPG	Steals per game
BPG	Blocks per game	PPG	Points per game	**Bold**	Career high
†	Won an NBA championship	*	Led the league

==== Regular season ====
Year	Team	GP	GS	MPG	FG%	3P%	FT%	RPG	APG	SPG	BPG	PPG
1969–70	Boston	60	–	22.1	.452	–	.822	2.8	2.4	–	–	12.2
1970–71	Boston	75	–	37.2	.464	–	.799	5.0	4.8	–	–	21.3
1971–72	Boston	79	–	**41.3**	.431	–	.831	**5.6**	5.3	–	–	**23.1**
1972–73	Boston	**82***	–	39.6	.431	–	.781	5.0	**6.1**	–	–	19.7
1973–74†	Boston	**82***	–	39.5	.449	–	.837	4.3	5.5	1.3	**0.3**	18.1
1974–75	Boston	**82**	–	39.3	.457	–	.834	3.8	5.6	**1.6**	0.2	18.3
1975–76†	Boston	**82**	–	39.7	.449	–	.838	3.8	5.4	1.3	0.2	18.9
1976–77	Boston	**82**	–	40.6	.429	–	.869	4.7	6.0	1.4	**0.3**	19.6
1977–78	Boston	46	–	35.7	.419	–	.858	3.9	4.5	1.1	0.2	14.8
1978–79	Boston	47	–	31.0	.428	–	**.888**	2.7	4.6	1.1	0.1	12.5
1978–79	Golden State	29	–	30.4	.475	–	.870	2.5	4.6	0.9	0.1	12.3
1979–80	Golden State	78	–	26.3	**.476**	.167	.851	2.3	3.1	1.1	0.2	9.9
1980–81	Kansas City	13	–	18.2	.439	–	.611	1.6	2.8	0.8	0.1	6.4
Career		837	–	35.8	.444	.167	.834	4.0	4.9	1.3	0.2	17.2
All-Star		7	0	17.7	.483	–	.545	3.9	3.0	0.6	0.1	9.1

==== Playoffs ====
Year	Team	GP	GS	MPG	FG%	3P%	FT%	RPG	APG	SPG	BPG	PPG
1972	Boston	11	–	39.3	**.495**	–	.833	**5.4**	5.3	–	–	23.5
1973	Boston	13	–	**44.8**	.450	–	**.907**	4.2	**6.4**	–	–	**24.5**
1974†	Boston	**18**	–	42.5	.426	–	.739	4.2	5.4	0.8	0.1	16.6
1975	Boston	11	–	42.0	.441	–	.818	4.5	5.7	1.0	**0.4**	20.6
1976†	Boston	**18**	–	43.9	.445	–	.821	3.9	5.4	1.3	0.1	22.7
1977	Boston	9	–	43.9	.453	–	.848	4.3	5.8	**1.6**	0.0	23.3
Career		80	–	42.9	.449	–	.828	4.4	5.7	1.1	0.1	21.5

=== College ===
Year	Team	GP	GS	MPG	FG%	3P%	FT%	RPG	APG	SPG	BPG	PPG
1965–66	Kansas	9	—	—	.393	—	.538	**7.6**	—	—	—	11.3
1966–67	Kansas	27	—	—	.409		**.819**	5.6	—	—	—	14.8
1967–68	Kansas	**30**	—	—	.407	—	.722	3.6	—	—	—	15.3
1968–69	Kansas	18	—	—	**.469**	—	.734	4.7	—	—	—	**18.1**
Career		84	—	—	.420	—	.733	4.9	—	—	—	15.3

== See also ==
- National Basketball Association

== Bibliography ==
- Bodanza, Mark C. (2012). Make It Count: The Life and Times of Basketball Great JoJo White. iUniverse. ISBN 978-1-9389-0845-3.
