= Red Auerbach =

American basketball coach and executive (1917–2006)

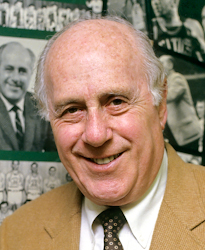
- Red Auerbach in front of a collage created by his brother, Zang Auerbach

Personal information
- Born: September 20, 1917 Brooklyn, New York, U.S.
- Died: October 28, 2006 (aged 89) Washington, D.C., U.S.
- Listed height: 5 ft 10 in (1.78 m)
- Listed weight: 170 lb (77 kg)

Career information
- High school: Eastern District (Brooklyn, New York)
- College: Seth Low JC (1936–1937); George Washington (1937–1940)
- Position: Guard
- Coaching career: 1940–1966

Career history

Playing
- 1943: Harrisburg Senators

Coaching
- 1940: St. Albans School
- 1940–1943: Roosevelt HS
- 1946–1949: Washington Capitols
- 1949: Duke (assistant)
- 1949–1950: Tri-Cities Blackhawks
- 1950–1966: Boston Celtics

Career highlights
- As head coach: 9× NBA champion (1957, 1959–1966); NBA Coach of the Year (1965); 11× NBA All-Star Game head coach (1957–1967); NBA anniversary team (25th, 35th); Top 10 Coaches in NBA History; Top 15 Coaches in NBA History; No. 2 retired by Boston Celtics; As executive: 7× NBA champion (1968, 1969, 1974, 1976, 1981, 1984, 1986); NBA Executive of the Year (1980)

Career coaching record
- NBA: 938–479 (.662)
- Record at Basketball Reference
- Basketball Hall of Fame

Arnold Jacob "Red" Auerbach (September 20, 1917 – October 28, 2006) was an American professional basketball coach and executive. As head coach, Auerbach led the Boston Celtics to eight consecutive NBA championships between 1959 and 1966. On retiring in 1966, he held an NBA coaching record of 938 wins. He served as general manager of the Celtics from 1966 to 1984, and later as president and vice-chairman of the Board. Auerbach won a combined 16 NBA titles in his long career with the Celtics, the most of any individual, making him one of the most successful team officials in the history of North American professional sports. He served as president of the Celtics until his death in 2006 at the age of 89.

Auerbach played a key role in bringing an end to racial discrimination in the NBA. In 1950, he drafted Chuck Cooper, the NBA's first African-American player. In December 1964, he introduced the first all-Black starting five. In 1966, Auerbach hired Bill Russell as the NBA's first African-American head coach.

Auerbach coached many players who were later inducted into the Basketball Hall of Fame. Auerbach himself was inducted into the Basketball Hall of Fame in 1969. In 1980, the Professional Basketball Writers Association of America voted Auerbach the greatest coach in the NBA history. He was also named NBA Executive of the Year in 1980. Auerbach has been regarded as one of the NBA 10 Greatest Coaches in history, was inducted into the National Jewish Sports Hall of Fame, and had his number 2 jersey retired at TD Garden, the Celtics' stadium.

== Early life ==
Arnold Jacob "Red" Auerbach was born in Brooklyn, New York City, on September 20, 1917. Auerbach was one of four children born to Marie and Hyman Auerbach (Yiddish: היימאַן אוירבך; Russian: Хайман Ауэрбах). Hyman, a Russian-Jewish immigrant from Minsk, Russian Empire (present-day Belarus), arrived in the United States at age thirteen. He married American-born Marie Auerbach (née Thompson). In Brooklyn, the couple first owned a delicatessen before transitioning into the dry-cleaning business. Their son Arnold spent his childhood in Williamsburg, Brooklyn, playing basketball. He earned the nickname "Red" due to his distinctive flaming red hair and fiery temper.

During the Great Depression, Auerbach played basketball as a guard at P.S. 122 and Eastern District High School, where he was named "Second Team All-Brooklyn" by the World-Telegram in his senior year.

== College career ==
After a season at Seth Low Junior College, Auerbach received an athletic scholarship to play for the George Washington Colonials men's basketball team in Washington, D.C. Auerbach was regarded as a standout basketball player. Auerbach was a three-time letterman, team captain, and led the team in scoring in 1940. Auerbach graduated with a Bachelor of Arts in Education in 1940, and a Master of Education in 1941. In those years, Auerbach began to develop the technique known as the fast break.

== Coaching career ==
=== St. Albans School (1941) ===
In 1941, Auerbach began coaching basketball and teaching at the St. Albans School in Washington, D.C.

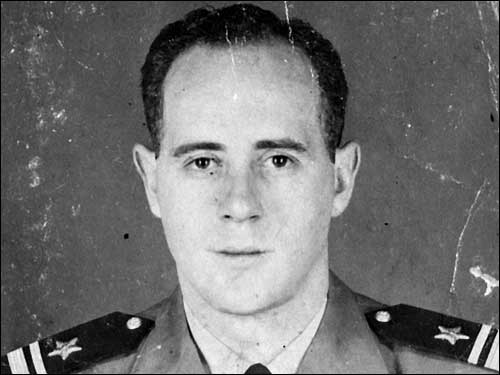
Auerbach's Navy headshot, likely taken in late 1943.

=== Roosevelt High School (1941–1943) ===
Auerbach coached basketball and baseball and taught at Roosevelt High School in Washington, D.C. for two years.

On February 4, 1943, Auerbach appeared in a game for the Harrisburg Senators of the American Basketball League (ABL) and scored one point.

=== United States Navy ===
Auerbach enlisted in the U.S. Navy in June 1943. He served for three years as a Rehabilitation and Physical Training officer. He primarily served in a medical capacity at the Walter Reed National Military Medical Center. Auerbach also coached at the Naval Station Norfolk in Norfolk, Virginia. He was released from active duty as a Lieutenant (junior grade) in October 1946.

=== Washington Capitols (1946–1949) ===
While with the U.S. Navy, Auerbach caught the eye of Washington millionaire Mike Uline, who hired him to coach the Washington Capitols in the newly founded Basketball Association of America (BAA), a predecessor to the NBA.

In the 1946–47 BAA season, Auerbach led a fast break-oriented team built around early BAA star Bones McKinney and various ex-Navy players to a 49–11 win–loss record. Their record included a 17-game winning streak that stood as the single-season league record until 1969. In the playoffs, however, they were defeated by the Chicago Stags in six games.

The following year the Capitols went 28–20 but were eliminated from the playoffs in a one-game Western Division tie-breaker. In the 1948–49 season, the Capitols won their first fifteen games and finished at 38–22. The team reached the BAA Finals but were beaten by the Minneapolis Lakers, led by Hall of Famer George Mikan. In the following season, the BAA and the rival National Basketball League merged to become the NBA, and Auerbach felt he had to rebuild his squad. However, owner Uline declined his proposals, and Auerbach resigned.

=== Duke Blue Devils (1949) ===
After leaving the Capitols, Auerbach became assistant coach of the Duke Blue Devils men's basketball team. It was assumed that Auerbach would take over for head coach Gerry Gerard, who was battling cancer. During his tenure at Duke, Auerbach regularly worked with future All-American Dick Groat. Auerbach later wrote that he "felt pretty bad waiting for [Gerard] to die" and that it was "no way to get a job".

=== Tri-Cities Blackhawks (1949–1950) ===
Auerbach left Duke after a few months when Ben Kerner, owner of the Tri-Cities Blackhawks, gave him the green light to rebuild the team from scratch. Auerbach traded more than two dozen players in just six weeks. The revamped Blackhawks ended the 1949–50 NBA season with a losing record of 28–29. Auerbach resigned when Kerner traded Auerbach's favorite player, John Mahnken.

In 1950, Auerbach took a position as the athletic director of Kutsher's Hotel in the Catskills, NY. Kutsher's was the center of a summertime basketball league, and players from the New York City area would participate, playing for one of several local country clubs and hotels.

=== Boston Celtics (1950–1966) ===
Before the 1950–51 NBA season, Walter Brown, owner of the Boston Celtics, was desperate to turn around his struggling and financially strapped franchise, which was reeling from a 22–46 record. Brown hired Auerbach. In the 1950 NBA draft, Auerbach made some notable moves. First, he famously snubbed future Hall of Fame point guard Bob Cousy. He argued that Cousy lacked the poise necessary to make his team and called him a "local yokel". Instead, he selected Bowling Green center Chuck Share with the first overall pick. Auerbach used the Celtics' second-round pick on Chuck Cooper, the first black player to be drafted into the NBA. This pick effectively broke the color barrier in professional basketball.

Entering the 1951 season, the Celtics core players were Ed Macauley, Bones McKinney and Bob Cousy. With Auerbach's fast-break tactics, the Celtics achieved a 39–30 record but lost in the 1951 NBA Playoffs to the New York Knicks. However, the relationship between Auerbach and Cousy improved when the coach helped craft the young guard—an already outstanding dribbler and passer—into a great playmaker.

In the following 1951–52 NBA season, the Celtics obtained guard Bill Sharman. Sharman, who was drafted in the second round of the 1950 NBA draft, played his rookie season with the Washington Capitols. When the Capitols folded after the 1950 season, Sharman was selected by the Fort Wayne Pistons in the dispersal draft and subsequently traded to the Celtics before the 1951 season. With the high-scoring Macauley, elite passer Cousy, and new prodigy Sharman, Auerbach had his team. Other notable players who joined the Celtics during these early years were forwards Frank Ramsey and Jim Loscutoff. For the next five seasons, the Celtics would make the playoffs every year but never won a title. The Celtics struggled in the playoffs, going 10–17 in the postseason from 1951 through 1956. As Cousy put it: "we would get tired in the end and couldn't get the ball." As a result, Auerbach sought a defensive big man who could get easy rebounds, initiate fast breaks, and close out games.

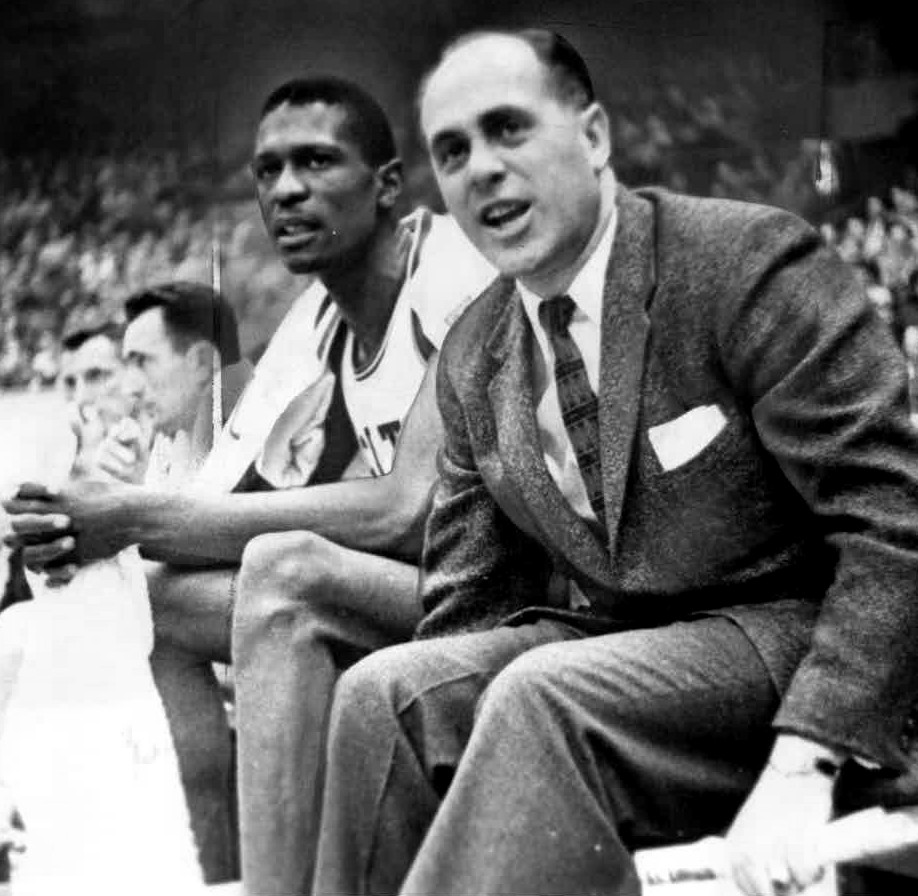
Auerbach sitting on the bench next to rookie Bill Russell during a game at Boston Garden on December 26, 1956. Bob Cousy can be seen in the background.

On the day of the 1956 NBA draft, Auerbach acquired Bill Russell, a defensive rebounding center, via a draft-day trade with the rival St. Louis Hawks. Auerbach also selected forward Tom Heinsohn and guard K.C. Jones, two future Hall of Famers. Emphasizing team play rather than individual performances, and stressing that defense was more important than offense, Auerbach drilled his players to play tough defense and force opposing turnovers for easy fast-break points. Forward Tom “Satch” Sanders recalled, "defense and conditioning were the best parts of those teams".

Anchored by Russell, the Celtics forced their opponents to take low-percentage shots from farther distances (there was no three-point arc at the time). This strategy allowed Auerbach's Celtics to take advantage on the fast break. Auerbach also emphasized the need for role players like Frank Ramsey and John Havlicek, who became two of the first legitimate sixth men in NBA history, a role later played by Don Nelson. Auerbach's recipe demoralized the opposition. From 1957 to 1966, the Celtics won nine of ten NBA championships. This included eight consecutive championships—the longest championship streak in North American sports—and six finals victories over the Los Angeles Lakers Hall of Famers Elgin Baylor and Jerry West. The Celtics' dominance during this time denied perennial scoring and rebounding champion Wilt Chamberlain a title during Auerbach's coaching reign.

In 1964, Auerbach sent out the first African-American starting five in NBA history. The players were Bill Russell, Willie Naulls, Tom Sanders, Sam Jones, and K.C. Jones. For the 1966–67 NBA season, Auerbach appointed Bill Russell as the first African-American coach in NBA history. Auerbach also popularized smoking a victory cigar whenever he thought a game was already decided, a habit that became a popular tradition in the Boston area. Auerbach had a reputation as a fierce competitor. He often got into verbal altercations with officials and was frequently fined and ejected.

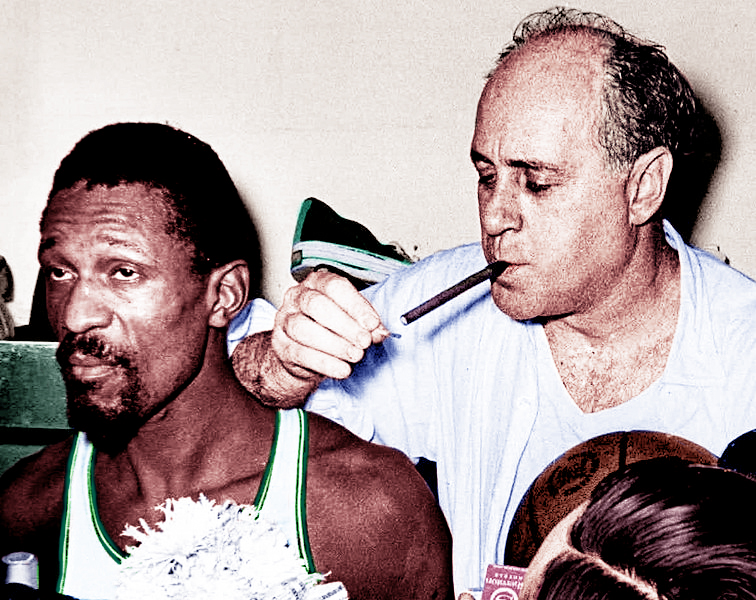
Bill Russell next to coach Auerbach after winning the 1966 NBA Finals.

Thirteen players who played for Auerbach have been inducted into the Basketball Hall of Fame—Macauley, Ramsey, Cousy, Sharman, Heinsohn, Clyde Lovellette, Arnie Risen, Andy Phillip, John R. Thompson (as a coach), Russell, K.C. Jones, Havlicek, and Sam Jones. Sharman, Heinsohn, and Russell would become three of only five people to be inducted into the Hall of Fame as both players and coaches.

Before the 1965–66 NBA season, Auerbach announced the coming year would be his last as coach, stating to the rest of the league, "This is your chance to take your last shot at me." After losing Game 1 of the 1966 Finals to the Lakers in overtime, he publicly named his successor, center Bill Russell. The Celtics won the series in seven games.

== Executive career ==
=== Boston Celtics (1966–2006) ===
Russell took over as a player-coach for the 1966–67 NBA season, becoming the first African American head coach in the four major North American professional team sports. While his pupil led the Celtics to two additional titles in 1968 and 1969, Auerbach rebuilt the aging Celtics with shrewd draft picks, namely future Hall of Famers Dave Cowens and Jo Jo White, as well as Paul Westphal and Don Chaney. With ex-player Tom Heinsohn coaching the Celtics and led by former sixth man John Havlicek, Auerbach's recruits won the Atlantic Division every year from 1972 to 1976, winning the NBA title in 1974 and 1976. Auerbach also signed veteran forward/center Paul Silas and ex-ABA star Charles Scott.

However, Auerbach could not prevent the Celtics from going south at the end of the 1970s. He traded away both Silas and Westphal because they wanted salary increases that would have made them higher earners than what he believed to be the best player on the Celtics (Cowens), which was not acceptable to Auerbach. While the Westphal trade to the Phoenix Suns in exchange for Charlie Scott was considered a success due to the Celtics' 13th title in 1976, Auerbach later admitted he erred in letting Silas go, even after Cowens personally begged him to give Silas a new deal. When Havlicek retired in 1978, the Celtics went 61–103 in two seasons. In the summer of 1978, after the worst in a string of contentious clashes with several different owners after Walter Brown's passing in 1964, Auerbach hopped into a taxi to take him to Logan Airport, where he was to board a flight to New York to consider a lucrative contract offer from Knicks owner Sonny Werblin. However, the cab driver pleaded with him to stay, emphasizing how much Bostonians loved him and considered him their family. Soon after, heading a team press conference, and with his typical bravado, Auerbach puffed on his trademark cigar and stated: "I'm not going anywhere. We're going to sign Larry Bird and we're going to be on top again." Despite knowing that Bird, a talented young player from unheralded Indiana State, had a year of college eligibility remaining, he had drafted Bird as a junior eligible in the 1978 NBA draft. He waited for a year until the future Hall of Fame forward Bird arrived, finally setting aside his team salary rules when it became clear that his choices were paying Bird a record-setting rookie salary or watching him re-enter the 1979 draft. Bird then became the highest-paid Celtic as a rookie, with a $650,000-per-year deal. Auerbach knew the brilliant, hard-working Bird would be the cornerstone of a new Celtics generation.

In 1980, Auerbach pulled off what became known as "The Steal of The Century". He convinced the Golden State Warriors to trade him a #3 overall pick and future Hall-of-Fame center Robert Parish in exchange for two picks in the 1980 NBA draft: #1 overall Joe Barry Carroll and the #13 pick Rickey Brown. With the #3 pick, Auerbach selected the player he most wanted in the draft, Kevin McHale, who would also be inducted into the Hall of Fame. The Parish-McHale-Bird frontcourt became one of the greatest in NBA history. Auerbach also hired head coach Bill Fitch, who led the revamped Celtics to the 1981 title.

In 1983, Auerbach named former Celtics player K.C. Jones as the coach. Starting in 1984, Jones coached the Celtics to four straight appearances in the NBA Finals, winning championships in 1984 and 1986. Auerbach also made a pair of shrewd trades that led to those titles, acquiring Dennis Johnson before the 1984 season to strengthen their backcourt defense, and Bill Walton before the 1986 season to provide much-needed bench scoring.

Auerbach, as a part-time side gig, was the color analyst on NBA and college basketball games for TBS Sports from 1982 to 1987.

In 1984, after he relinquished his general managing duties to Jan Volk, Auerbach focused on continuing as president and later vice-chairman of the Boston Celtics. In a surprising move after winning their 15th title, he traded popular guard Gerald Henderson, the Game 2 hero in the Finals against the Lakers, for Seattle's first-round draft pick in 1986. Two years later, after the Celtics defeated Houston in the finals for their 16th championship, he used the second overall pick in the 1986 draft, the pick acquired from Seattle, to take college prodigy Len Bias from Maryland, arguably the most brilliant coup in Auerbach's stellar career. With the team's star players still in their prime, the defending champions appeared set to compete at the top for years. However, tragedy struck just two days later, when Bias died of a cocaine overdose. Several years later, Celtics star player Reggie Lewis died suddenly in 1993. Without any league compensation for either loss, the team fell into decline, not seeing another Finals appearance in Auerbach's lifetime.

In an interview, Auerbach confessed that he lost interest in big-time managing in the early 1990s, preferring to stay in the background and concentrating on his pastimes, racquetball and his cigar-smoking. He would, however, stay on with the Celtics as president until 1997, as vice chairman until 2001, and then became president again, a position he held until his death, although in his final years, he was weakened by heart problems and often used a wheelchair.

== Personal life ==
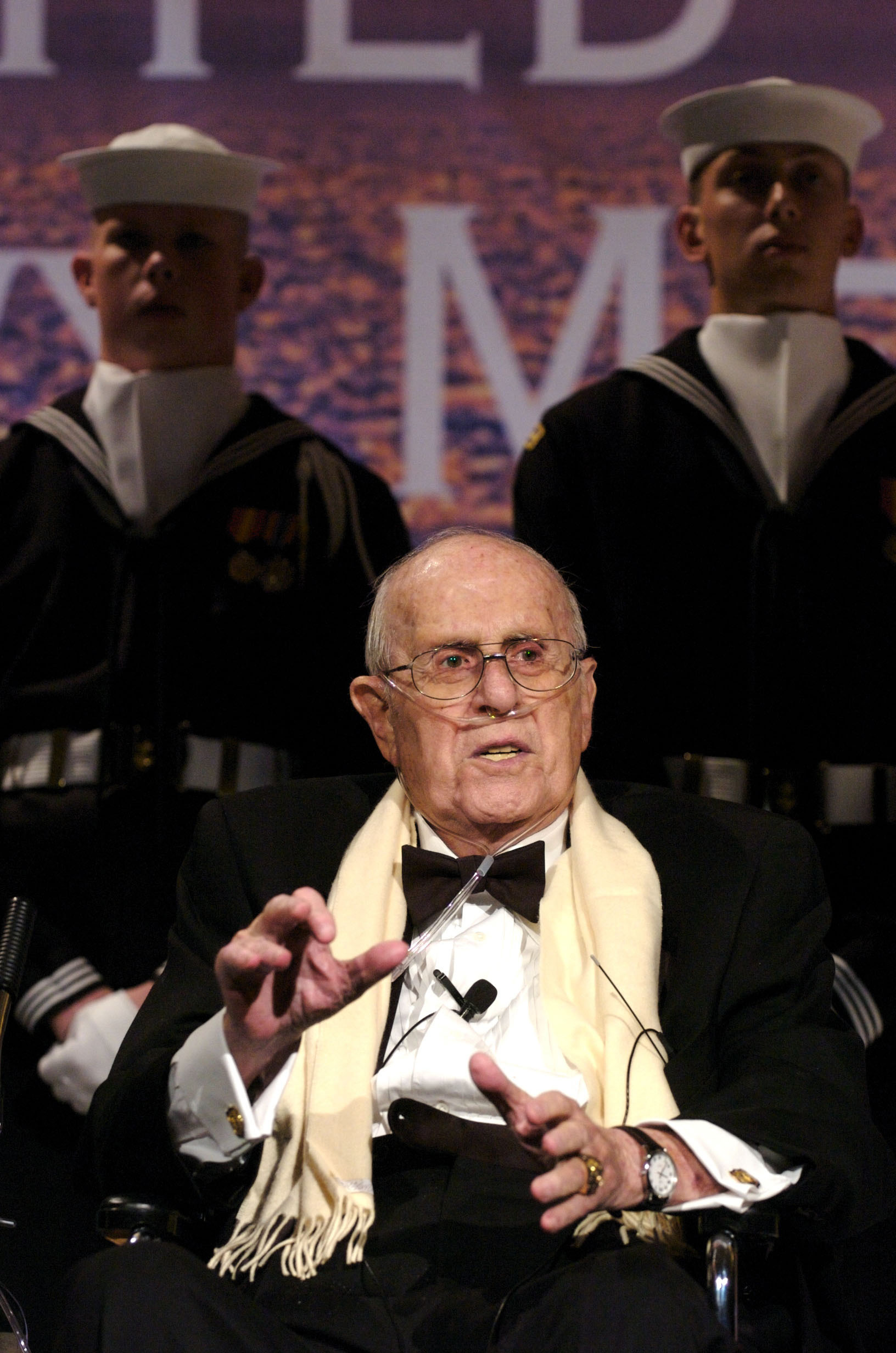
Auerbach was honored on October 25, 2006, three days before his death, for his service in the Navy during World War II.

Auerbach was one of four children of American-born Marie Auerbach and Russian-Jewish immigrant Hyman Auerbach in Brooklyn. His brother Zang Auerbach, 4 years his junior, was a respected cartoonist and portraitist at the Washington Star. Zang also helped create the iconic Boston Celtics leprechaun logo.

Auerbach married Dorothy Lewis in the spring of 1941. The couple had two daughters, Nancy and Randy. They also helped raise Nancy's daughter Julie.

Auerbach enjoyed smoking cigars. In the 1960s, some Boston restaurants displayed signs stating, "No cigar or pipe smoking, except for Red Auerbach". In addition, Auerbach was well known for his love of Chinese food. In an interview shortly before his death, he explained that since the 1950s, Chinese takeout was the most convenient nutrition: NBA teams used to travel on regular flights and had a tight schedule, so filling up the stomach with heavier non-Chinese food meant wasting time and risking travel-sickness. Over the years, Auerbach became so fond of this food that he even became a part-owner of a Chinese restaurant in Boston. Despite a heart operation, he remained active in his 80s, playing racquetball and making frequent public appearances.

Despite his fierce nature, Auerbach was popular among his players. He recalled that at his 75th birthday party, 45 of his former players showed up; and when he turned 80, his perennial 1960s-era foe Wilt Chamberlain showed up, a gesture Auerbach dearly appreciated.

In an interview with ESPN, Auerbach stated that his all-star fantasy team would consist of Bill Russell—who in the former's opinion was the ultimate player to start a franchise with—as well as Bob Pettit, Elgin Baylor, Oscar Robertson and Jerry West, with John Havlicek as the sixth man. As for the greatest basketball players of all time, Auerbach's candidates were Russell, Larry Bird, Magic Johnson, Kareem Abdul-Jabbar, and Michael Jordan. Auerbach made multiple such "all-time" rankings over the years, with his last one being in June 2006, months before his death. Auerbach talked about his fictional team with journalist Ken Shouler which featured the following: Abdul-Jabbar, Chamberlain, and Russell at center; Bird, Erving, Pettit, and Baylor at forward; and Robertson, Jordan, Havlicek, Johnson, and Cousy at guard.

Auerbach was elected to the American Jewish Sports Hall of Fame in 1991. In 1993, Auerbach received an honorary Doctor of Public Service from George Washington University.

=== Death ===
Auerbach died of a heart attack on October 28, 2006, at the age of 89. NBA commissioner David Stern said, "The void caused by his death will never be filled." Players Bill Russell, K.C. Jones, John Havlicek and Larry Bird, as well as contemporaries like Jerry West, Pat Riley, and Wayne Embry, universally hailed Auerbach as one of the greatest personalities in NBA history. Bird stated, "Red shared our passion for the game, our commitment to excellence, and our desire to do whatever it takes to win." Auerbach was survived by his daughters Nancy and Randy; his granddaughter Julie; and his great-grandchildren Peter, Hope and Noelle. Auerbach was interred in Falls Church, Virginia, at King David Memorial Gardens within National Memorial Park on October 31, 2006. Attendees included basketball dignitaries Bill Russell, Kevin McHale, Danny Ainge, and David Stern.

During the 2006–07 NBA season, NBA TV and NBA.com aired reruns of Auerbach's four-minute instructional videos known as "Red on Roundball" previously aired during NBA on CBS halftime shows in the 1970s and 1980s, and as a testament to his importance in the Boston sports world, the Boston Red Sox honored Auerbach at their April 20, 2007 game against the New York Yankees by wearing green uniforms and by hanging replicated Celtics championship banners on the "Green Monster" at Fenway Park. Boston won 7–6.

Before Boston's season opener against the Wizards, his signature was officially placed on the parquet floor near center court, thereby naming the court as "Red Auerbach Parquet Floor". The ceremony was attended by his daughter Randy and Celtics legends. The signature replaced the Red Auerbach memorial logo used during the 2007 season.

== Writing ==
Auerbach was the author of seven books. His first, Basketball for the Player, the Fan and Coach, has been translated into seven languages and is the best-selling basketball book in print. His second book, co-authored with Paul Sann, was Winning the Hard Way. He also wrote a pair of books with Joe Fitzgerald: Red Auerbach: An Autobiography and Red Auerbach On and Off the Court. In October 1991, M.B.A.: Management by Auerbach was co-authored with Ken Dooley. In 1994, Seeing Red was written with Dan Shaughnessy. In October 2004, his last book, Let Me Tell You a Story, was co-authored with sports journalist John Feinstein.

== Legacy ==
Auerbach is widely regarded as one of the greatest coaches in NBA history. The NBA's Coach of the Year Award is named in his honour. Auerbach is remembered as a pragmatic coach and executive with a sense of loyalty to his players. Many of his former players, including Bill Russell and Don Nelson, became successful coaches in the NBA.

In 1985, the Celtics retired a number 2 jersey with Auerbach's name, to recognize his significant contributions to the franchise.

In 1985, the Boston Celtics retired the #2 jersey with Auerbach's name.

In 1985, a statue of Auerbach was unveiled outside of Quincy Market in Downtown Boston

Auerbach was included in the 2008 documentary The First Basket, which chronicles the history of Jews in Basketball.

In 2018, the Celtics opened the Red Auerbach Center as the team's new practice facility and headquarters.

=== Coaching pioneer ===
Auerbach favoured the fast break strategy, which involved a quick outlet pass to fast-moving guards who attempted to score before the opposing team could re-establish its defensive position. Auerbach is credited for transforming basketball into a team sport that emphasized defence. He also invented the concept of the role player and the sixth man, stating: "Individual honors are nice, but no Celtic has ever gone out of his way achieving them. We have never had the league's top scorer. We won seven league championships without placing even one among the league's top 10 scorers. Our pride was never rooted in statistics."

Auerbach is remembered for his unique tactics, which have been described as "psychological warfare." He attempted to provoke opposing players and officials with unabashed trash talk. He was ejected more often and received more fines than any other coach in NBA history. One notable incident came during a preseason game in 1983, when Auerbach stormed the court and screamed nose-to-nose with the 6'10" 260-pound Moses Malone. Auerbach was softer with his own players. Earl Lloyd, the first black player to play in the NBA, said: "Red Auerbach convinced his players that he loved them... so all they wanted to do was please him."

=== Arnold "Red" Auerbach Award ===
The Celtics have internally awarded the Arnold "Red" Auerbach Award since 2006, which recognizes a player or coach who "best exemplifies the spirit and meaning of a true Celtic."

== NBA coach statistics ==
Legend
Regular season	G	Games coached	W	Games won	L	Games lost	W–L %	Win–loss %
Playoffs	PG	Playoff games	PW	Playoff wins	PL	Playoff losses	PW–L %	Playoff win–loss %

Team	Year	G	W	L	W–L%	Finish	PG	PW	PL	PW–L%	Result
Washington	1946–47	60	49	11	.817	1st in Eastern	6	2	4	.333	Lost in BAA semifinals
Washington	1947–48	48	28	20	.583	2nd in Western (tie)	-	-	-	–	Lost division tiebreaker
Washington	1948–49	60	38	22	.633	2nd in Eastern	11	6	5	.545	Lost in BAA Finals
Tri-Cities	1949–50	57	28	29	.491	2nd in Eastern	3	1	2	.333	Lost in Division semifinals
Boston	1950–51	69	39	30	.565	2nd in Eastern	2	0	2	.000	Lost in Division semifinals
Boston	1951–52	66	39	27	.591	2nd in Eastern	3	1	2	.333	Lost in Division semifinals
Boston	1952–53	71	46	25	.648	3rd in Eastern	6	3	3	.500	Lost in Division finals
Boston	1953–54	72	42	30	.583	3rd in Eastern	2	0	2	.000	Lost in Division finals
Boston	1954–55	72	36	36	.500	4th in Eastern	7	3	4	.429	Lost in Division finals
Boston	1955–56	72	39	33	.542	2nd in Eastern	3	1	2	.333	Lost in Division semifinals
Boston	1956–57	72	44	28	.611	1st in Eastern	10	7	3	.700	Won NBA Championship
Boston	1957–58	72	49	23	.681	1st in Eastern	11	6	5	.545	Lost in NBA Finals
Boston	1958–59	72	52	20	.722	1st in Eastern	11	8	3	.727	Won NBA Championship
Boston	1959–60	75	59	16	.787	1st in Eastern	13	8	5	.615	Won NBA Championship
Boston	1960–61	79	57	22	.722	1st in Eastern	10	8	2	.800	Won NBA Championship
Boston	1961–62	80	60	20	.750	1st in Eastern	14	8	6	.571	Won NBA Championship
Boston	1962–63	80	58	22	.725	1st in Eastern	13	8	5	.615	Won NBA Championship
Boston	1963–64	80	59	21	.738	1st in Eastern	10	8	2	.800	Won NBA Championship
Boston	1964–65	80	62	18	.775	1st in Eastern	12	8	4	.667	Won NBA Championship
Boston	1965–66	80	54	26	.675	2nd in Eastern	17	11	6	.647	Won NBA Championship
Career		1417	938	479	.662		168	99	69	.589	

== See also ==
- The First Basket
- List of select Jewish basketball players
- List of NBA championship head coaches
- List of coaches in the Naismith Memorial Basketball Hall of Fame
- List of Boston Celtics head coaches
- Statue of Red Auerbach
- Auerbach Center

== Notes ==
- Obituary (January 19, 2007), Jewish Chronicle, p. 45
- Halberstam, David. The Breaks of the Game. Random House. 1981

Preceded by Jack Waldron	President of the Boston Celtics; 1970–1997	Succeeded by Rick Pitino
Preceded by Rick Pitino	President of the Boston Celtics; 2001–2006	Succeeded by Rich Gotham
