= St. Michael's High School (Union City, New Jersey) =

High school in New Jersey, U.S.

St. Michael's High School was a Catholic high school in Union City, New Jersey, that operated under the auspices of the Roman Catholic Archdiocese of Newark.

The school closed at the end of the 1985-86 school year in the face of a drop in enrollment and rising debt.

== Athletics ==
The boys track team won the outdoor non-public state championship in 1941, 1942, 1944 and 1945.

The boys basketball team came into the tournament with a record of 6-14 and went on to win the NJSIAA Non-Public B state championship in 1965, defeating St. Mary's High School by a score of 62-52 in the finals.

== Notable alumni ==
- Gordon Chiesa (born 1949/50), basketball coach at the collegiate and NBA level, who served as the assistant coach for the Utah Jazz for 16 seasons
- Lou Cordileone (born 1937), former American football offensive lineman, who played six seasons in the National Football League
- Tom Heinsohn (1934–2020), professional basketball player who was associated with the Boston Celtics of the National Basketball Association for six decades as a player, coach and broadcaster
- Robert C. Janiszewski (born 1945), politician who served as county executive of Hudson County
- Nick Piantanida (1932–1966), amateur parachute jumper who reached 123,500 feet (37,600 m) with his Strato Jump II balloon on February 2, 1966
- Robert Ranieri (born 1929), politician who represented the 33rd legislative district in the New Jersey General Assembly.
- Paul Tagliabue (born 1940), lawyer who was the commissioner of the National Football League from 1989 to 2006

== Notable faculty ==
- Rose Marie Battaglia (1929–2020), basketball coach at the high school and college levels, who was inducted into the Women's Basketball Hall of Fame
