= Auerbach Center =

Sports venue in Boston, Massachusetts

Red Auerbach Center
- Interactive map of Red Auerbach Center
- Location: 40 Guest Street; Boston, Massachusetts
- Coordinates: 42.357390°N 71.145780°W
- Owner: New Balance
- Operator: Boston Celtics
- Capacity: 195
- Public transit: Framingham/Worcester Line at Boston Landing

Construction
- Groundbreaking: September 15, 2016
- Opened: June 19, 2018

Tenant
- Boston Celtics (practice facility)

The Auerbach Center is the practice facility for the National Basketball Association (NBA)'s Boston Celtics, located in Boston, Massachusetts. Designed by Elkus Manfredi Architects, in collaboration with Lucinda Loya Interiors, the 160,000-square-foot building is part of a larger mixed-use development being constructed by New Balance at Boston Landing that includes the headquarters of New Balance and that will also include shops, a hotel and the practice facility of the Boston Bruins directly next door.

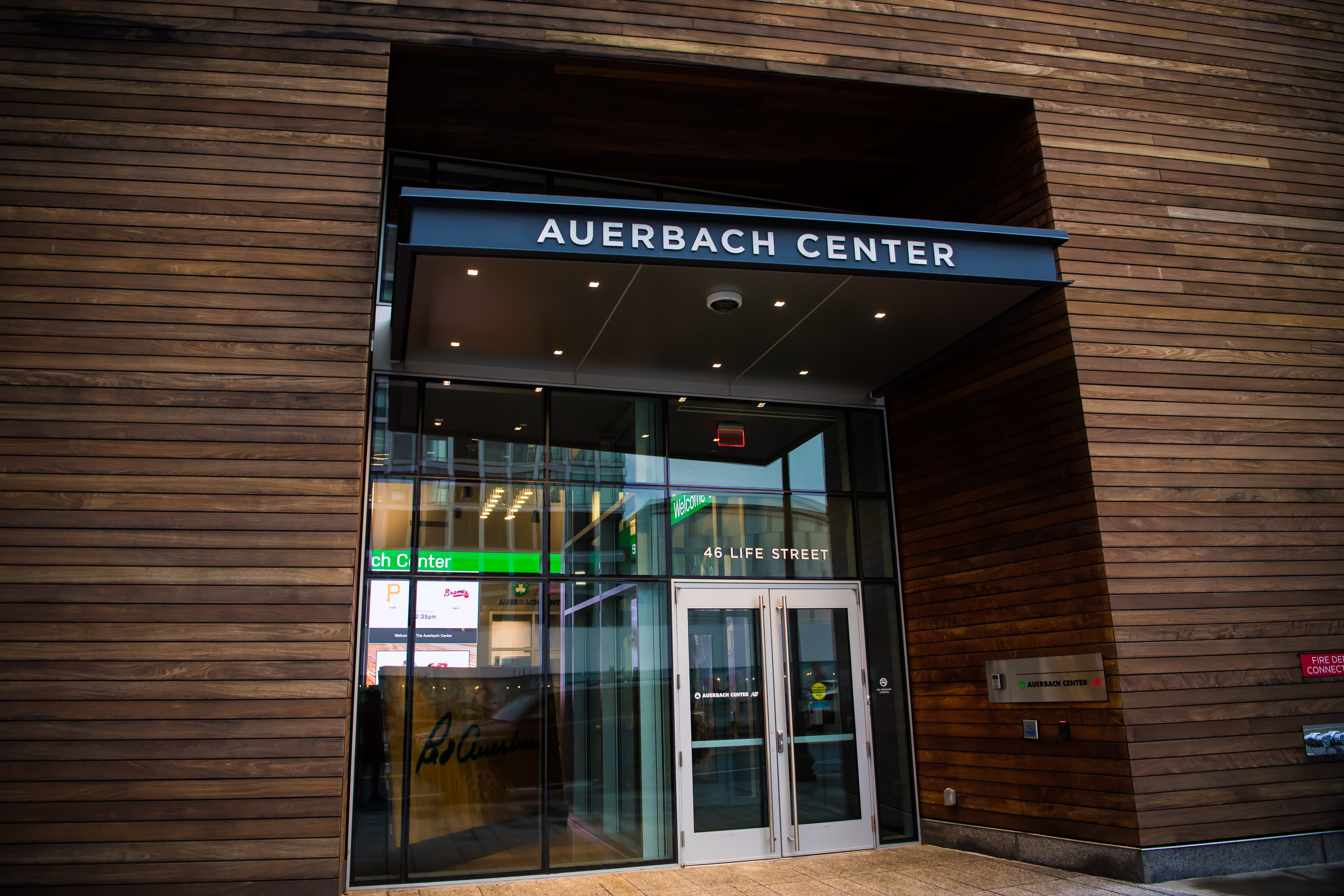
The entrance to the Auerbach Center

Named for the Celtics former president, general manager, and head coach Arnold "Red" Auerbach, the basketball practice facility is spread across the top two floors of The Auerbach Center and will include two parquet floor basketball courts. There is seating for 195 people overlooking the courts. The facility includes locker rooms, a players’ lounge, media space, strength and conditioning facilities, physical therapy areas with hydrotherapy pools, a sports science laboratory for Celtics' performance data collection, nutrition facilities, and a medical examination room containing GE Medical Imaging equipment. A 40-foot glass wall at The Auerbach Center facing the adjacent Massachusetts Turnpike allows visibility of the Celtics’ basketball practice facility.

Public transit to the facility is via the Massachusetts Bay Transportation Authority Boston Landing station, a station on the MBTA Commuter Rail system's Framingham/Worcester Line. Groundbreaking took place in December 2014, with the completed facility hosting its grand opening on September 8, 2016. The Auerbach Center itself opened to the public on June 19, 2018.

The Celtics' fellow tenants at the TD Garden when both are in their respective wintertime league seasons, the Boston Bruins of the National Hockey League, have their own practice facility at Warrior Ice Arena, just east of the Auerbach Center, at 80 Guest Street.
