= Gordon Chiesa =

American basketball player and coach

Gordon Chiesa (born 1949 or 1950) is an American basketball coach at the collegiate and NBA level, who served as the assistant coach for the Utah Jazz for 16 seasons from 1989–90 to 2004–05.

== Early life ==
A native of Union City, New Jersey, he played prep basketball at St. Michael's High School in his hometown.

As a college student, Chiesa played point guard and left St. Thomas Aquinas College in Sparkill, New York, as the school's all-time leader in career assists (448) and assists average (8.1 apg). He led the Spartans to a 21–6 record and a postseason bid in his senior year.

== Career ==
Chiesa's career began as the athletic director and head basketball coach at his alma mater of St. Thomas Aquinas College, where he guided the Spartans to three 20-win seasons and several postseason tournaments.

Following his tenure at St. Thomas Aquinas, Chiesa served as an assistant coach at Dartmouth from 1979 to 1981. He then accepted the head coaching position at Manhattan College, where he coached from 1981 to 1985 and was named the Metro Athletic Conference Coach of the Year in 1983. Chiesa joined Rick Pitino's staff at Providence College as an assistant coach from 1985 to 1987, before becoming head coach for the 1987–88 season. After posting a miserable 11–17 record, Chiesa was replaced as head coach by Rick Barnes who the following season posted an impressive 18–11 record and led the same team to the first round of the NCAA Division I men's basketball tournament.

He joined the Orlando Magic on August 30, 2012, as special consultant to the head coach. He previously served as a consultant for the NBA Development League for the previous two seasons (2010–12). During his coaching career, Chiesa served as an assistant coach for two Hall of Fame coaches – Jerry Sloan with the Utah Jazz and Rick Pitino at Providence College.

Chiesa was an assistant coach with the Utah Jazz, for 16 seasons from 1989–90 to 2004–05. During his tenure, he helped guide Utah to a pair of Western Conference crowns, three Midwest Division championships, a regular season record of 809–471 (.632) and 14 consecutive postseason appearances, including 149 playoff games. Chiesa has also been an assistant coach with New Jersey, Seattle and Memphis, and was director of pro scouting for the Grizzlies.

Chiesa is one of a select few assistant coaches to serve in both the NBA Finals (1997 and 1998) and the NCAA Final Four (1987).

Chiesa was inducted into the Hudson County Sports Hall of Fame in January 2001 for his achievements as a college and professional basketball coach. He was also inducted into the New England Basketball Hall of Fame in September 2009.

== Personal life ==
Chiesa and his wife, Nancy, have two sons, Matthew and Craig.
