= Rose Marie Battaglia =

American basketball coach (1929–2020)

Rose Marie Battaglia (1929 – November 24, 2020) was an American basketball coach. She coached at both high school and college levels, before retiring in 1989. She was inducted into the Women's Basketball Hall of Fame in 2018.

== Biography ==
Battaglia attended Panzer School of Physical Education. Panzer eventually combined with Montclair State University and became Montclair State Teacher College in 1958. She graduated from Montclair State in 1966 and then continued her education at the University of Utah and got her PhD. When Battaglia went back to school to get her PhD, she stopped teaching physical education but was still working. She taught others the game of basketball and ran her own clinics.

== Coaching career ==
Battaglia began her coaching career at Paramus Catholic High School in New Jersey. While she coached here she had 274 victories and she won 2 straight state championships. While coaching at Paramus Catholic, she also coached at Bergen Community College, which was diagonally across the street. She amassed 702 college-level victories; these were combined between Bergen Community College and Iona College. She also coached at St. Michael's High School in Union City and Benedictine Academy in Elizabeth.

== Legacy ==
Battaglia was inducted into the NJCAA Hall of Fame in 1999 and the New Jersey State Interscholastic Athletic Association Hall of Fame in 1996. In 1998, she was the WBCA Jostens-Berenson Lifetime Achievement Award recipient. In 2000, she was named the New Jersey Collegiate Basketball Coaches Association Lifetime Achievement Award recipient.

Along with six others, Battaglia was inducted into the Women's Basketball Hall of Fame in June 2018 in Knoxville, Tennessee.
