= Seth Low Junior College =

Columbia University outpost (1928–1938)

Seth Low Junior College, located at 375 Pearl Street in Brooklyn, New York, was founded in 1928 by Columbia University, as "one of Columbia’s many attempts to deal with a changing student population that they felt was contaminating its pristine, Protestant campus." It was named for Seth Low, former President of Columbia University (1890–1901), who had been Mayor of Brooklyn (1881–1885) and of New York (1902–1903). Faced with competition from tuition-free Brooklyn College, founded in 1930, and affected by the Great Depression, it closed its Brooklyn campus and ceased admitting new students in 1936. (Existing students completed their studies on the Morningside Heights campus.) All activities ended in 1938. The college is little known anymore; Isaac Asimov, who had never heard of it when referred there, remarked that for the rest of his life, he "never heard of anyone who has ever heard of it—unless he, too, had been a student there."

== Academics ==
Enrollment was limited to 300 male students. Tuition was the same as at the main Columbia campus, $380. All faculty were "regular members of the departments of Columbia University in which they serve."

Students who completed two years at Seth Low were eligible for admission to Columbia's Schools of Architecture or Business, or its optometry program. After three years of study, which necessarily included at least some classes on the Morningside Heights campus, the students were eligible for admission to the Schools of Law, Medicine, Engineering, or the Union Theological Seminary.

== A second-class college for Jews ==
The enrollment at Seth Low was "heavily Jewish, with a strong Italian minority". According to Asimov, "it was clear that the purpose of the school was to give bright youngsters of unacceptable social characteristics a Columbia education without too badly contaminating the elite young men of the College itself by their formal presence."

== Famous students ==
The most famous student of Seth Low College was Isaac Asimov, who, after rejection by Columbia College on Columbia's main campus, studied at Seth Low from 1935 to 1936, then transferring to Columbia. He has written at length about his time at Seth Low.

Basketball player and coach Red Auerbach also studied at Seth Low, as did historian Herbert Aptheker and politician Seymour Halpern.

== Podcast ==
The first episode of Gatecrashers, a podcast series about Jews and the Ivy League colleges, is about Seth Low.

== Archival material ==
The Columbia University Libraries have compiled a guide to their Seth Low Junior College papers.

The student newspaper The Seth Low Scop is available in the Internet Archive.

== See also ==
- Numerus clausus#North America
