= Boston Celtics accomplishments and records =

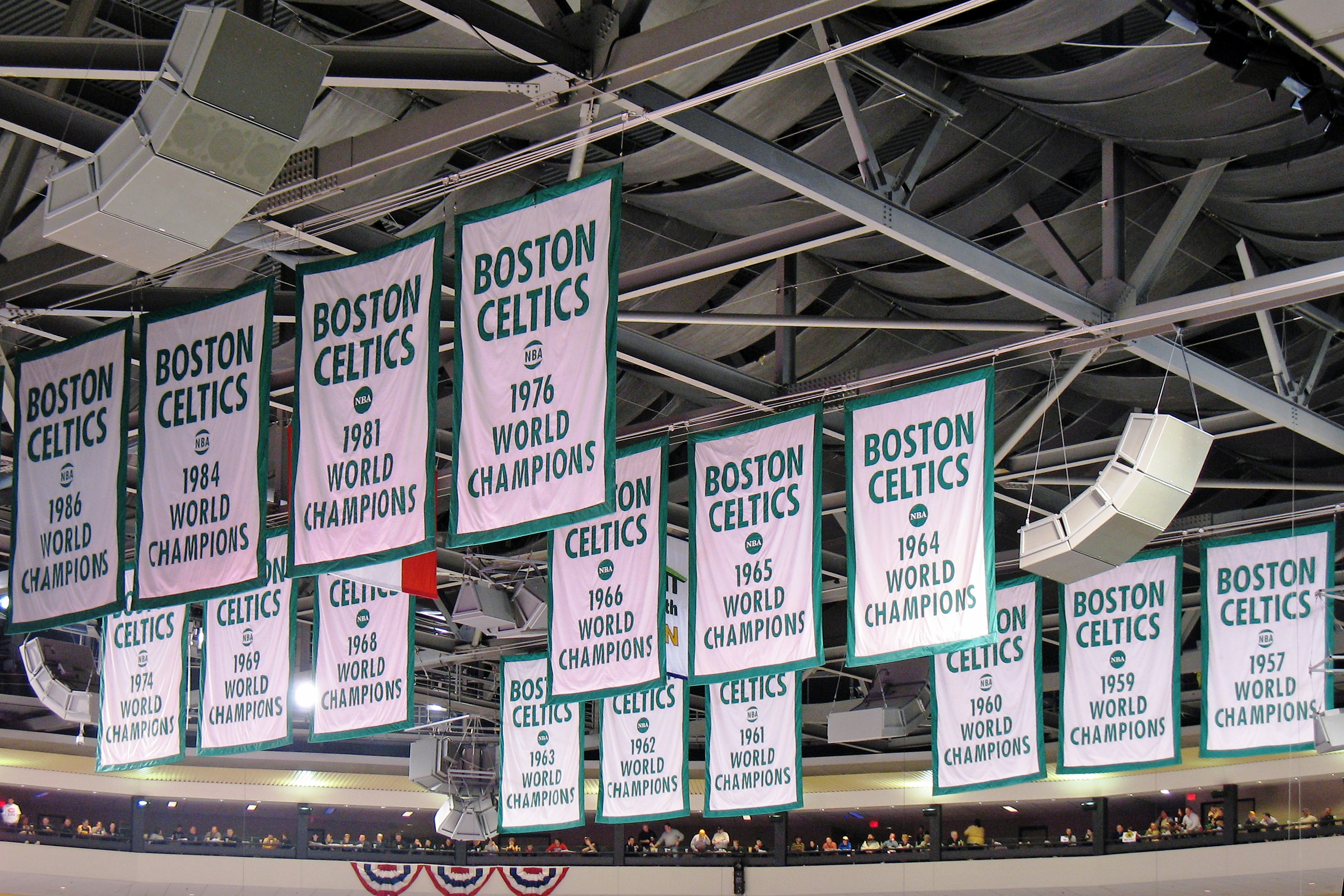
Celtics' NBA championship banners hanging from the rafters at TD Garden

This is a comprehensive list of the accomplishments and records of the Boston Celtics. The Celtics are an American professional basketball team currently playing in the National Basketball Association.

The Celtics have won an NBA-record 18 championships. Forty-eight members of the Naismith Memorial Basketball Hall of Fame are connected to the Celtics, and the franchise has retired 23 jersey numbers, more than any other American sports team. As of December 2023, the Celtics have won more NBA regular season games than any other team.

== Playoffs ==
=== Championships (18) ===
The Celtics' 18 NBA Championships are the most of any NBA franchise. Boston's first 13 championships were won as the Walter A. Brown Trophy (original trophy retired in 1976), and five recent championships were won as the Larry O'Brien Championship Trophy (introduced in 1977 as the second incarnation of the Walter A. Brown Trophy, renamed in 1984).

- 1957
- 1959
- 1960
- 1961
- 1962
- 1963
- 1964
- 1965
- 1966
- 1968
- 1969
- 1974
- 1976
- 1981
- 1984
- 1986
- 2008
- 2024

=== Conference titles (11) ===
Since 2022, the Eastern Conference championship trophy was renamed the Bob Cousy Trophy in honor of the legendary Celtics player.

- 1974
- 1976
- 1981
- 1984
- 1985
- 1986
- 1987
- 2008
- 2010
- 2022
- 2024

=== Division titles (35) ===
Since 2022, the Atlantic Division championship was awarded to that division's first-place team, and was named the Nat "Sweetwater" Clifton Trophy in honor of the first African American player to sign an NBA contract.

- 1957
- 1958
- 1959
- 1960
- 1961
- 1962
- 1963
- 1964
- 1965
- 1972
- 1973
- 1974
- 1975
- 1976
- 1980
- 1981
- 1982
- 1984
- 1985
- 1986
- 1987
- 1988
- 1991
- 1992
- 2005
- 2008
- 2009
- 2010
- 2011
- 2012
- 2017
- 2022
- 2023
- 2024
- 2025

=== Regular season titles (19) ===
Since 2023, the NBA has awarded the Maurice Podoloff Trophy to the team who finished with the best overall record in the regular season.

- 2024

== Hall of Fame ==
37 people were inducted in the Naismith Memorial Basketball Hall of Fame as players, 7 – as coaches, 6 – as contributors.

Boston Celtics Hall of Famers
Players
No.	Name	Position	Tenure	Inducted	No.	Name	Position	Tenure	Inducted
22	Ed Macauley	F/C	1950–1956	1960	17	Andy Phillip	G	1956–1958	1961
14	Bob Cousy	G	1950–1963	1971	6	Bill Russell ^{3}	C	1956–1969	1975
21	Bill Sharman	G	1951–1961	1976	23	Frank Ramsey	G/F	1954–1964	1982
24	Sam Jones	G/F	1957–1969	1984	17	John Havlicek	G/F	1962–1978	1984
15; 20	Tom Heinsohn ^{1}	F	1956–1965	1986	20	Bob Houbregs	C/F	1954	1987
44	Pete Maravich	G	1980	1987	4; 34	Clyde Lovellette	C	1962–1964	1988
25; 27	K. C. Jones	G	1958–1967	1989	44	Dave Bing	G	1977–1978	1990
18	Dave Cowens	F/C	1970–1980	1991	7	Nate Archibald	G	1978–1983	1991
5	Bill Walton	C	1985–1988	1993	18	Bailey Howell	F	1966–1970	1997
19	Arnie Risen	C	1955–1958	1998	33	Larry Bird ^{2}	F	1979–1992	1998
32	Kevin McHale	F	1980–1993	1999	11	Bob McAdoo	C/F	1979	2000
00	Robert Parish	C	1980–1994	2003	12	Dominique Wilkins	F	1994–1995	2006
3	Dennis Johnson	G	1983–1990	2010	53	Artis Gilmore	C	1988	2011
20	Gary Payton	G	2004–2005	2013	10	Jo Jo White	G	1969–1979	2015
36	Shaquille O'Neal	C	2010–2011	2016	11	Charlie Scott	G	1975–1977	2018
40	Dino Rađa	F/C	1994–1997	2018	20	Ray Allen	G	2007–2012	2018
11	Chuck Cooper	F	1950–1954	2019	4	Carl Braun	G	1961–1962	2019
44	Paul Westphal	G	1972–1975	2019	5	Kevin Garnett	F	2007–2013	2020
34	Paul Pierce	F	1998–2013	2021	4	Chauncey Billups	G	1997–1998	2024
Coaches
Name		Position	Tenure	Inducted	Name		Position	Tenure	Inducted
Doggie Julian		Head coach	1948–1950	1968	2	Red Auerbach	Head coach	1950–1966	1969
Rick Pitino		Head coach	1997–2001	2013	Tom Heinsohn ^{1}		Head coach	1969–1978	2015
Bill Fitch		Head coach	1979–1983	2019	Bill Russell ^{3}		Head coach	1966–1969	2021
Doc Rivers		Head coach	2004–2013	2026					
Contributors
Name		Position	Tenure	Inducted	Name		Position	Tenure	Inducted
1	Walter A. Brown	Owner	1945–1964	1965	Bill Mokray		Executive	1946–1969	1965
28	Wayne Embry	C	1966–1968	1999	Dave Gavitt		Executive	1990–1994	2006
16	Satch Sanders ^{4}	F	1960–1973	2011	17	Don Barksdale	F	1953–1955	2012

Additionally, Johnny Most and Mike Gorman were honored with the Hall of Fame's Curt Gowdy Media Award. Most was awarded in 1993 for his 37-year career as the Celtics radio announcer, while Gorman was awarded in 2021 for his 40-year career as the Celtics television announcer.

Notes:

- ^{1} In total, Heinsohn was inducted into the Hall of Fame twice – as player and as coach.
- ^{2} In total, Bird was inducted into the Hall of Fame twice – as player and as a member of the 1992 Olympic team.
- ^{3} In total, Russell was inducted into the Hall of Fame twice – as player and as coach.
- ^{4} Sanders was also coached the team in 1978.

== Retired numbers ==
The Celtics have retired 23 numbers, the most of any professional sports franchise in North America.

Robert Parish, C (1980–1994); retired January 18, 1998

Walter A. Brown, founder, owner (1946–1964); retired October 17, 1964

Red Auerbach, head coach, executive (1950–2006); retired January 4, 1985

Dennis Johnson, G (1983–1990); retired December 13, 1991

Kevin Garnett, F (2007–2013); retired March 13, 2022

Bill Russell, C ^{1} (1956–1969); retired March 12, 1972

Jo Jo White, PG (1969–1979); retired April 9, 1982

Bob Cousy, PG (1950–1963); retired October 16, 1963

Tom Heinsohn, F ^{2}
(1956–1965); retired October 15, 1966

Satch Sanders, PF ^{3}
(1960–1973); retired January 19, 1973

John Havlicek, SF (1962–1978); retired October 13, 1978

Dave Cowens, C ^{4}
(1970–1980); retired February 8, 1981

Jim Loscutoff, PF ^{5} (1955–1964); retired April 8, 1977

Don Nelson, F (1965–1976); retired December 15, 1976

Bill Sharman, G (1951–1961); retired October 15, 1966

Ed Macauley, C (1950–1956); retired October 16, 1963

Frank Ramsey, SF (1954–1964); retired October 16, 1965

Sam Jones, SG (1957–1969); retired March 9, 1969

K.C. Jones, PG ^{6} (1958–1967); retired February 12, 1967

Cedric Maxwell, SF ^{7} (1977–1985); retired December 15, 2003

Kevin McHale, PF (1980–1993); retired January 30, 1994

Larry Bird, F (1979–1992); retired February 4, 1993

Paul Pierce, F (1998–2013); retired February 11, 2018

Reggie Lewis, PG ^{8} (1987–1993); retired March 22, 1995

Johnny Most, broadcaster (1953–1990); retired 1990
- ^{1} Also served as head coach (1966–69). Retired league-wide in 2022.
- ^{2} Also served as head coach (1969–78); as broadcaster (1966–1969, 1980–2020).
- ^{3} Also served as head coach (1978).
- ^{4} Also served as head coach (1978–79).
- ^{5} Loscutoff, who wore #18, asked that his legacy be honored by allowing other Celtics to wear his number in the future. On one of the banners of retired numbers at the TD Garden, Loscutoff is represented by a square with the letters "LOSCY". #18 was later retired for Dave Cowens.
- ^{6} Also served as head coach (1983–88).
- ^{7} Also served as broadcaster (1995-present); briefly wore No. 30 in 1977–78.
- ^{8} Lewis died of cardiac arrest while still playing for the team; number retired posthumously.

== Award winners ==
NBA MVP

- Bob Cousy – 1957
- Bill Russell – 1958, 1961–1963, 1965
- Dave Cowens – 1973
- Larry Bird – 1984–1986

NBA Eastern Conference finals MVP

- Jayson Tatum – 2022
- Jaylen Brown – 2024

NBA Finals MVP

- John Havlicek – 1974
- Jo Jo White – 1976
- Cedric Maxwell – 1981
- Larry Bird – 1984, 1986
- Paul Pierce – 2008
- Jaylen Brown – 2024

NBA Defensive Player of the Year

- Kevin Garnett – 2008
- Marcus Smart - 2022

NBA Hustle Award

- Marcus Smart – 2019, 2022, 2023

NBA Sportsmanship Award

- Jrue Holiday – 2025
- Derrick White – 2026

NBA Rookie of the Year

- Tom Heinsohn – 1957
- Dave Cowens – 1971
- Larry Bird – 1980

NBA Sixth Man of the Year

- Kevin McHale – 1984, 1985
- Bill Walton – 1986
- Malcolm Brogdon – 2023
- Payton Pritchard – 2025

NBA Coach of the Year

- Red Auerbach – 1965
- Tom Heinsohn – 1973
- Bill Fitch – 1980
- Joe Mazzulla – 2026

NBA Executive of the Year

- Red Auerbach – 1980
- Danny Ainge – 2008
- Brad Stevens – 2024, 2026

Community Assist Award

- Isaiah Thomas – 2017
- Jaylen Brown – 2020

Kareem Abdul-Jabbar Social Justice Champion

- Jrue Holiday – 2025

All-NBA First Team

- Ed Sadowski – 1948
- Ed Macauley – 1951–1953
- Bob Cousy – 1952–1961
- Bill Sharman – 1956–1959
- Bill Russell – 1959, 1963, 1965
- John Havlicek – 1971–1974
- Larry Bird – 1980–1988
- Kevin McHale – 1987
- Kevin Garnett – 2008
- Jayson Tatum – 2022–2025

All-NBA Second Team

- Bill Sharman – 1953, 1955, 1960
- Ed Macauley – 1954
- Bill Russell – 1958, 1960–1962, 1964, 1966–1968
- Tom Heinsohn – 1961–1964
- Bob Cousy – 1962, 1963
- John Havlicek – 1964, 1966, 1968–1970, 1975, 1976
- Sam Jones – 1965–1967
- Dave Cowens – 1973, 1975, 1976
- Jo Jo White – 1975, 1977
- Nate Archibald – 1981
- Robert Parish – 1982
- Larry Bird – 1990
- Paul Pierce – 2009
- Isaiah Thomas – 2017
- Kyrie Irving – 2019
- Jaylen Brown – 2023, 2026

All-NBA Third Team

- Robert Parish – 1989
- Paul Pierce – 2002, 2003, 2008
- Rajon Rondo – 2012
- Jayson Tatum – 2020

NBA All-Rookie First Team

- John Havlicek – 1963
- Jo Jo White – 1970
- Dave Cowens – 1971
- Larry Bird – 1980
- Kevin McHale – 1981
- Dee Brown – 1991
- Antoine Walker – 1997
- Ron Mercer – 1998
- Paul Pierce – 1999
- Jayson Tatum – 2018

NBA All-Rookie Second Team

- Brian Shaw – 1989
- Rick Fox – 1992
- Dino Rađa – 1994
- Eric Montross – 1995
- J. R. Bremer – 2003
- Al Jefferson – 2005
- Ryan Gomes – 2006
- Rajon Rondo – 2007
- Kelly Olynyk – 2014
- Marcus Smart – 2015
- Jaylen Brown – 2017

NBA All-Defensive First Team

- Bill Russell – 1969
- John Havlicek – 1972–1976
- Paul Silas – 1975, 1976
- Dave Cowens – 1976
- Kevin McHale – 1986–1988
- Dennis Johnson – 1987
- Kevin Garnett – 2008, 2009, 2011
- Rajon Rondo – 2010, 2011
- Avery Bradley – 2016
- Marcus Smart – 2019, 2020, 2022
- Derrick White – 2026

NBA All-Defensive Second Team

- Tom Sanders – 1969
- John Havlicek – 1969–1971
- Don Chaney – 1972–1975
- Dave Cowens – 1975, 1980
- Larry Bird – 1982–1984
- Kevin McHale – 1983, 1989, 1990
- Dennis Johnson – 1984–1986
- Rajon Rondo – 2009, 2012
- Kevin Garnett – 2012
- Avery Bradley – 2013
- Al Horford – 2018
- Robert Williams III – 2022
- Derrick White – 2023, 2024
- Jrue Holiday – 2024

== NBA All-Star weekend ==
All-Star Game Selections

- Bob Cousy – 1951–1963
- Ed Macauley – 1951–1956
- Bill Sharman – 1953–1960
- Tom Heinsohn – 1957, 1961–1965
- Bill Russell – 1958–1969
- Sam Jones – 1962, 1964–1966, 1968
- John Havlicek – 1966–1978
- Bailey Howell – 1967
- Jo Jo White – 1971–1977
- Dave Cowens – 1972–1978, 1980
- Paul Silas – 1975
- Nate Archibald – 1980–1982
- Larry Bird – 1980–1988, 1990–1992
- Robert Parish – 1981–1987, 1990, 1991
- Kevin McHale – 1984, 1986–1991
- Dennis Johnson – 1985
- Danny Ainge – 1988
- Reggie Lewis – 1992
- Antoine Walker – 1998, 2002, 2003
- Paul Pierce – 2002–2006, 2008–2012
- Ray Allen – 2008, 2009, 2011
- Kevin Garnett – 2008–2011, 2013
- Rajon Rondo – 2010–2013
- Isaiah Thomas – 2016, 2017
- Al Horford – 2018
- Kyrie Irving – 2018, 2019
- Jayson Tatum – 2020–2025
- Kemba Walker – 2020
- Jaylen Brown – 2021, 2023–2026

NBA All-Star Game head coaches

- Red Auerbach – 1957–1967
- Tom Heinsohn – 1972–1974, 1976
- Bill Fitch – 1982
- K. C. Jones – 1984–1987
- Chris Ford – 1991
- Doc Rivers – 2008, 2011
- Brad Stevens – 2017
- Joe Mazzulla – 2023

All-Star Most Valuable Player

- Ed Macauley – 1951
- Bob Cousy – 1954, 1957
- Bill Sharman – 1955
- Bill Russell – 1963
- David Cowens – 1973
- Nate Archibald – 1981
- Larry Bird - 1982
- Jayson Tatum – 2023

Slam Dunk champion

- Dee Brown – 1991
- Gerald Green – 2007

Three-Point Contest champion

- Larry Bird – 1986, 1987, 1988
- Paul Pierce – 2010

== See also ==
- NBA records
