= Statue of Red Auerbach =

Statue in Boston, Massachusetts, U.S.

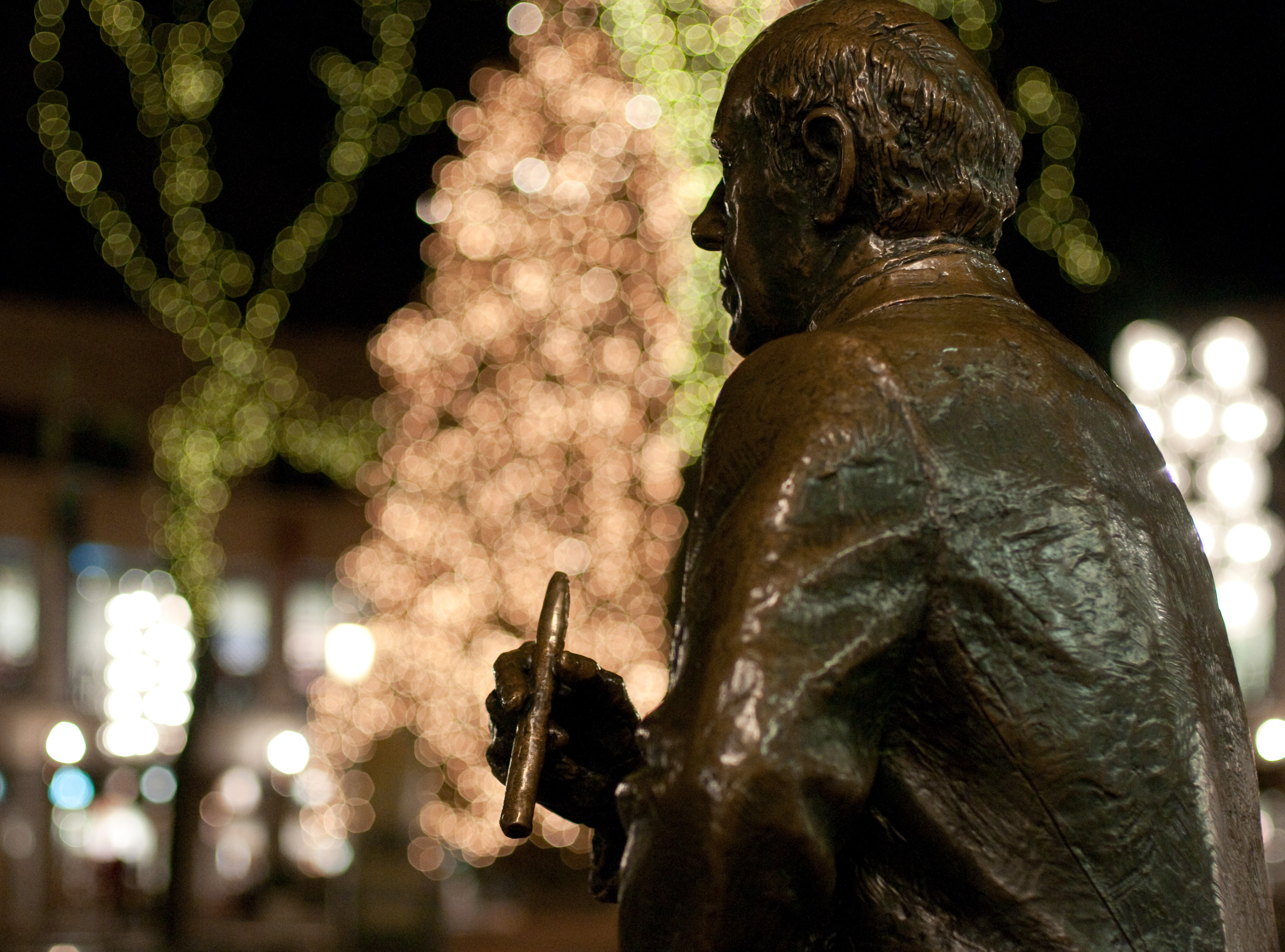
- Detail of the statue, 2010
- Artist: Lloyd Lillie
- Year: 1985
- Medium: Bronze sculpture
- Subject: Red Auerbach
- Location: Boston, Massachusetts, U.S.; 42°21′36″N 71°3′15.1″W

A statue of long-time Boston Celtics coach Red Auerbach by Lloyd Lillie (sometimes called Arnold "Red" Auerbach or Red Auerbach) is installed outside Quincy Market at Faneuil Hall, in Boston, Massachusetts, United States.

== Description ==
The bronze sculpture measures approximately 5 ft. x 6 ft. x 2 ft. 3 in. It depicts Auerbach sitting on a bench and holding a cigar.

== History ==
The statue was designed in 1985, and dedicated on September 20 of that year. It was surveyed by the Smithsonian Institution's "Save Outdoor Sculpture!" program in 1993.

== See also ==
- 1985 in art
