= Warrior Ice Arena =

Ice hockey arena in Boston, Massachusetts

- Location within Massachusetts Location within the United States
- Location: 90 Guest Street, Brighton, Boston, Massachusetts
- Coordinates: 42°21′27″N 71°08′39″W
- Owner: New Balance
- Operator: First Fitness Management, NB Development Group
- Capacity: 700
- Surface: Ice
- Field size: 200 ft × 85 ft (61 m × 26 m)
- Public transit: Framingham/Worcester Line at Boston Landing

Construction
- Groundbreaking: December 2014
- Opened: September 8, 2016
- Architect: Elkus-Manfredi

Tenants
- Boston Pride (PHF) (2016–2023); Stonehill Skyhawks (NCAA) (2024–present) (Note: Part-time.); Boston Bruins

Website
- warrioricearena.com

Warrior Ice Arena is an ice hockey arena and practice facility in Brighton, Boston, Massachusetts. The arena is part of a larger mixed-use development being constructed by New Balance at Boston Landing that includes the headquarters of New Balance and that also includes shops, a hotel and the practice facility for both the Boston Bruins and a separate one for the Boston Celtics next door (The Auerbach Center). The arena is named after New Balance's Warrior Sports brand, which is the brand New Balance uses for their hockey products.

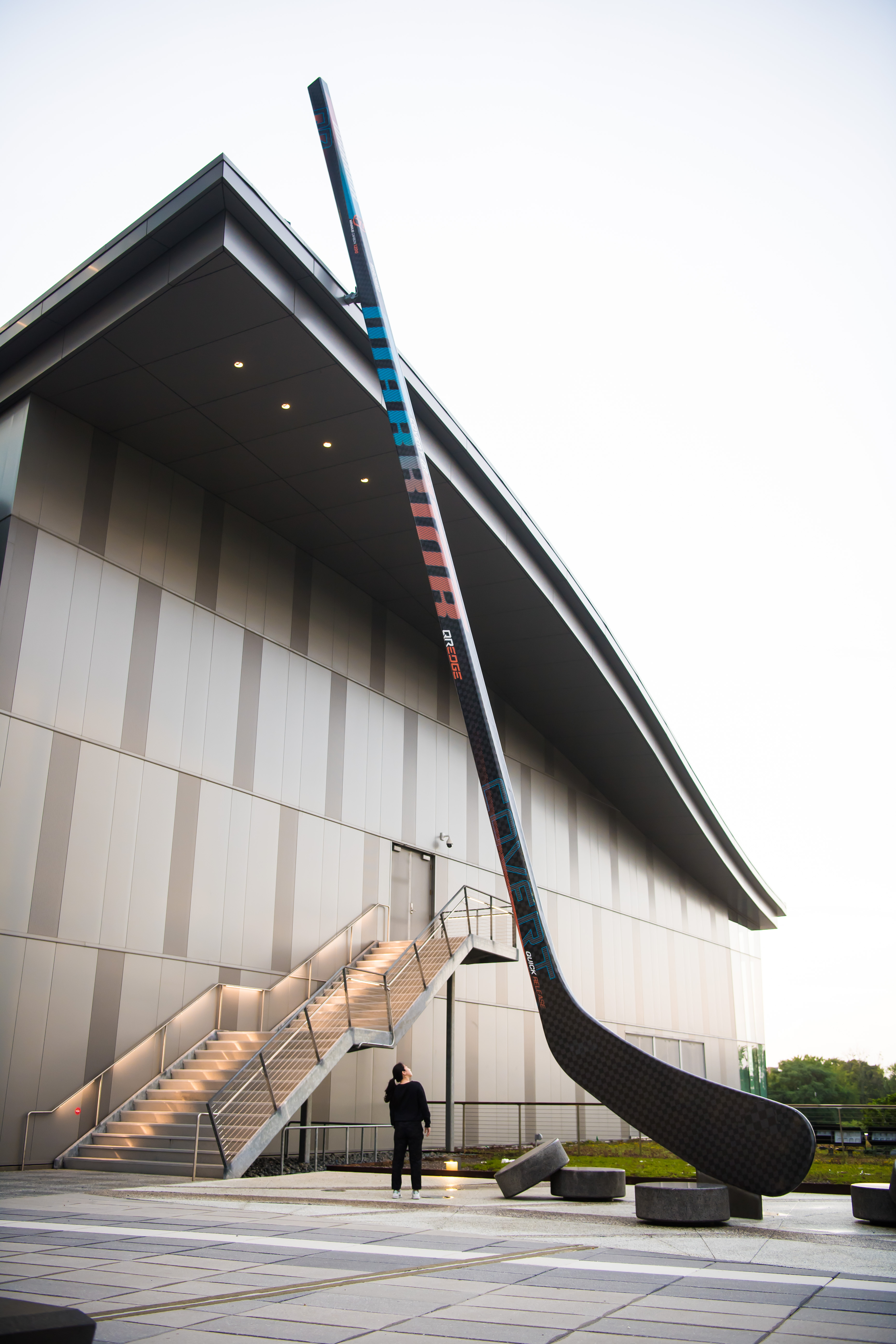
Hockey Stick Display Statue - Warrior Ice Arena Boston

Warrior Arena was the home arena of the Boston Pride of the Premier Hockey Federation and the practice facility of the Boston Bruins of the National Hockey League who moved in from Harvard University's Bright-Landry Hockey Center, and Ristuccia Ice Arena in Wilmington, Massachusetts, respectively.

Public transit to the facility is via the MBTA Boston Landing station, a station on the MBTA Commuter Rail system's Framingham/Worcester Line. Groundbreaking took place in December 2014, with the completed facility hosting its grand opening on September 8, 2016.
