= Tom Heinsohn =

American basketball player and coach (1934–2020)

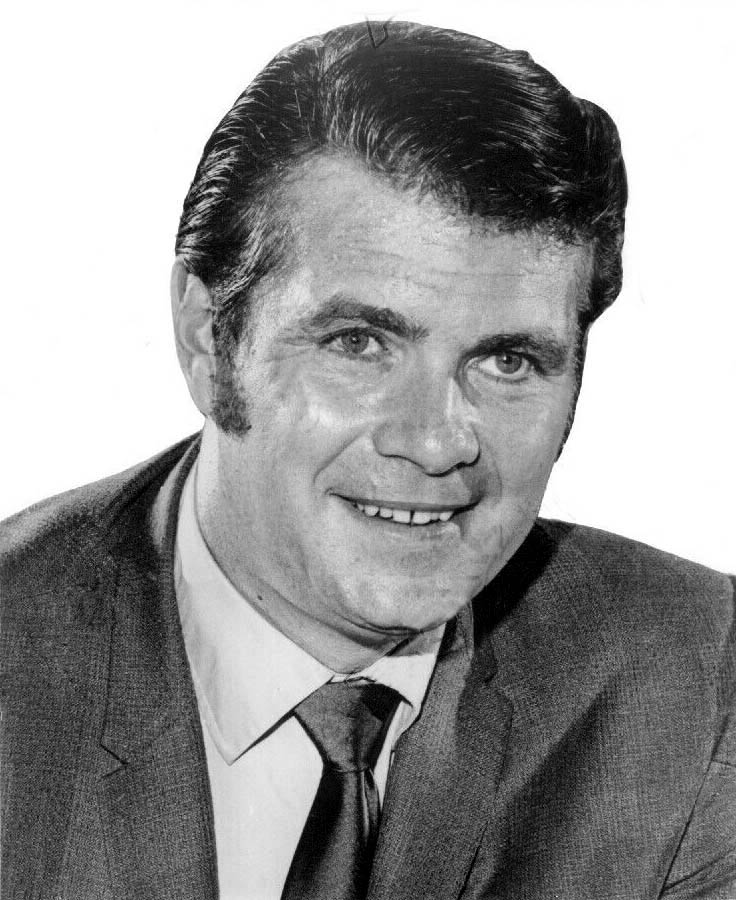
- Heinsohn in 1970

Personal information
- Born: August 26, 1934 Jersey City, New Jersey, U.S.
- Died: November 9, 2020 (aged 86) Newton, Massachusetts, U.S.
- Listed height: 6 ft 7 in (2.01 m)
- Listed weight: 218 lb (99 kg)

Career information
- High school: Saint Michael's (Union City, New Jersey)
- College: Holy Cross (1953–1956)
- NBA draft: 1956: territorial pick
- Drafted by: Boston Celtics
- Playing career: 1956–1965
- Position: Power forward
- Number: 15
- Coaching career: 1969–1978

Career history

Playing
- 1956–1965: Boston Celtics

Career highlights
- As player: 8× NBA champion (1957, 1959–1965); 6× NBA All-Star (1957, 1961–1965); 4× All-NBA Second Team (1961–1964); NBA Rookie of the Year (1957); No. 15 retired by Boston Celtics; NIT Championship (1954); Consensus first-team All-American (1956); Second-team All-American – Collier's (1955); Third-team All-American – AP, UPI, NEA (1955); No. 24 retired by Holy Cross Crusaders; As coach: 2× NBA champion (1974, 1976); NBA Coach of the Year (1973); 4× NBA All-Star Game head coach (1972–1974, 1976); Chuck Daly Lifetime Achievement Award (2009)

Career statistics
- Points: 12,194 (18.6 ppg)
- Rebounds: 5,749 (8.8 rpg)
- Assists: 1,318 (2.0 apg)
- Stats at NBA.com
- Stats at Basketball Reference
- Basketball Hall of Fame
- Collegiate Basketball Hall of Fame

Thomas William Heinsohn (August 26, 1934 – November 9, 2020) was an American professional basketball player, coach, and broadcaster. He was associated with the Boston Celtics of the National Basketball Association (NBA) for six decades as a player, coach and broadcaster. He played for the Celtics from 1956 to 1965, and also coached the team from 1969 to 1978. He spent over 30 years as the color commentator for the Celtics' local broadcasts alongside play-by-play commentator Mike Gorman. He is regarded as one of the most iconic Celtics figures in the franchise's history, known during his lifetime for his charisma and loyalty to the team and its traditions. From this, he earned the nickname "Mr. Celtic".

Heinsohn was inducted into the Naismith Memorial Basketball Hall of Fame for his contributions as a player. He was also inducted into the Hall of Fame for his success as a head coach. He also helped form the NBA Players Association. Heinsohn was the only person to have the distinction of being involved in an official team capacity in each of the Celtics' first 17 championships, as well as each of their first 21 NBA Finals appearances.

== Early life ==
Of German descent, Thomas William Heinsohn was born on August 26, 1934, in Jersey City, New Jersey. Heinsohn moved while in elementary school to Union City, New Jersey, where he was a standout at St. Michael's High School.

== College career ==
Heinsohn accepted a scholarship to Holy Cross in Worcester, Massachusetts. As a freshman Heinsohn led the team in scoring averaging 17.6 points per game. As a sophomore in 1953-1954, Heinsohn scored 444 points – the most-ever by a Holy Cross first-year varsity player at the time. Heinsohn concluded the year by scoring 45 points in three games during the National Invitation Tournament, earning All-NIT honors as Holy Cross claimed the championship. During the 1954-1955 season, Heinsohn led the Crusaders in scoring and rebounding while earning first team All-America honors. During his final year with the team in 1955-1956 he once again received first team All-America honors for the second time, setting what was then a school single-season scoring record with 740 points. Heinsohn left as the school's all-time leading scorer with 1,789 points, an average of 22.1 points per game. During his senior year, Heinsohn scored a school-record 51 points in a game against Boston College, and averaged 27.4 points per game and 21.1 rebounds per game for the season.

== Professional career ==
=== Boston Celtics (1956–1965) ===
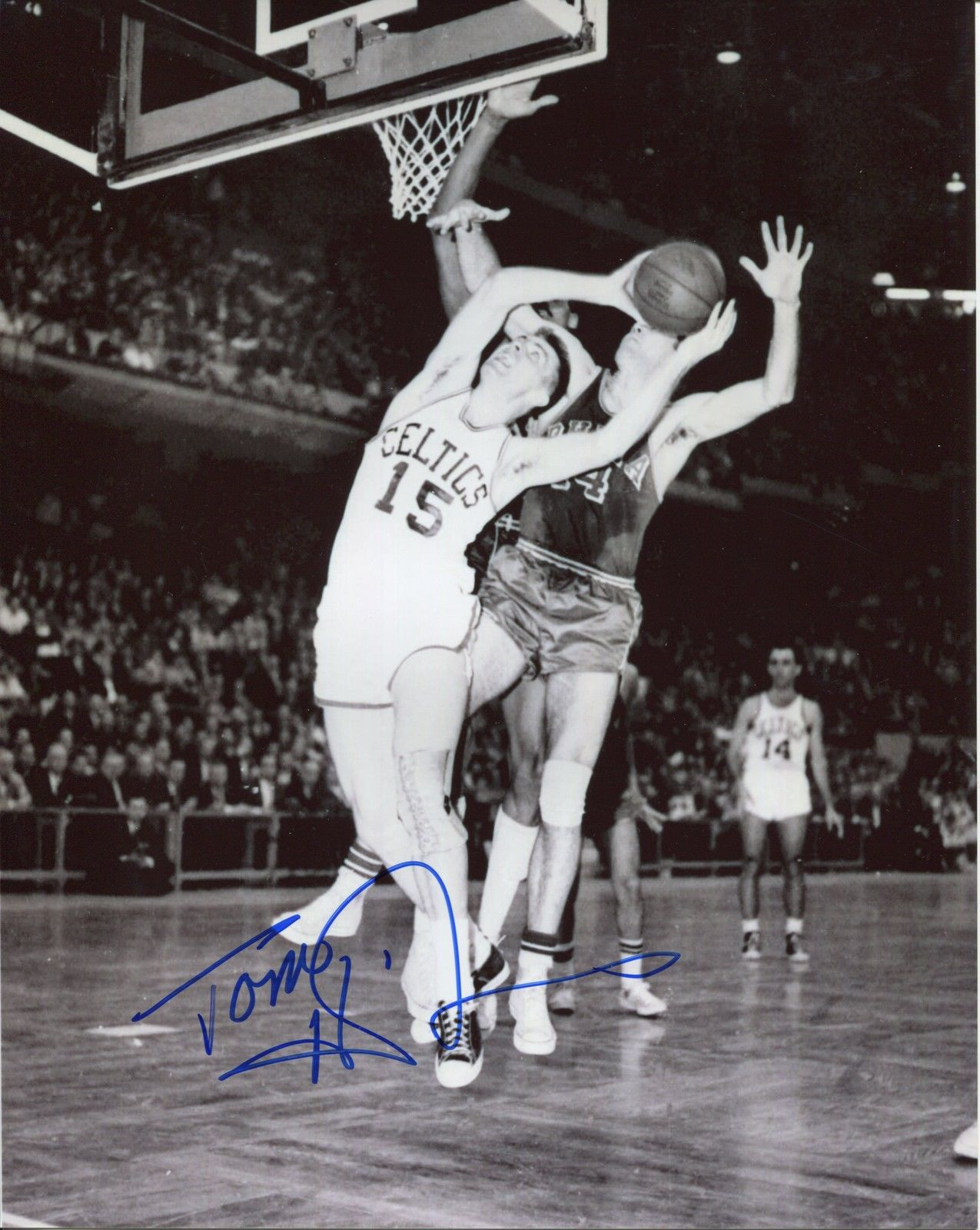
Heinsohn during a game against the Philadelphia Warriors, circa 1962

In 1956, Heinsohn was chosen as the Boston Celtics 'regional', or 'territorial', draft pick. In his first season, Heinsohn played in the NBA All-Star Game and was named the NBA Rookie of the Year over teammate Bill Russell. He finished his rookie season by winning his first championship ring, scoring 37 points and grabbing 23 rebounds in the double-overtime 7th game of the NBA Finals.

Standing at 6-7, throughout his career Heinsohn’s two primary moves on offense were a line drive jump shot, which was developed due to the low ceiling at his high school gym. His other shot which separated him from the rest of the league was his running hook, usually shooting it from corners. His coach Red Auerbach once described him as “the ideal forward,” “He could do it all: great offensive rebounding, great moves, great shots, including a beautiful soft hook, even great defense when he felt like playing it”

Heinsohn was part of a Celtics squad that won eight NBA titles in nine years, including seven in a row between 1959 and 1965, leading the team in scoring from 1960 to 1962 averaging 20+ PPG each of those seasons. In NBA history, only teammates Russell and Sam Jones won more championship rings during their playing careers, and Heinsohn's streak of going to the NBA Finals each season of his nine-year career is unmatched. Heinsohn was also the first in NBA history to score 1,000 points in the NBA Finals. Heinsohn retired after nine seasons due to a foot injury.

During his playing career, Heinsohn was named to six All-Star teams. On the day his teammate and fellow Holy Cross Crusader Bob Cousy retired, Heinsohn scored his 10,000th career point. His number 15 was retired by the Celtics in 1966.

Off the court, Heinsohn played an important leadership role in the NBA Players Association. He was the association's second president from 1958-1966, following founding president Bob Cousy, and was instrumental in the league's acceptance of a pension plan for players following a showdown at the All-Star game in 1964, in which the All-Star players, led by Heinsohn, threatened to strike.

== Coaching career ==
=== Boston Celtics (1969–1978) ===
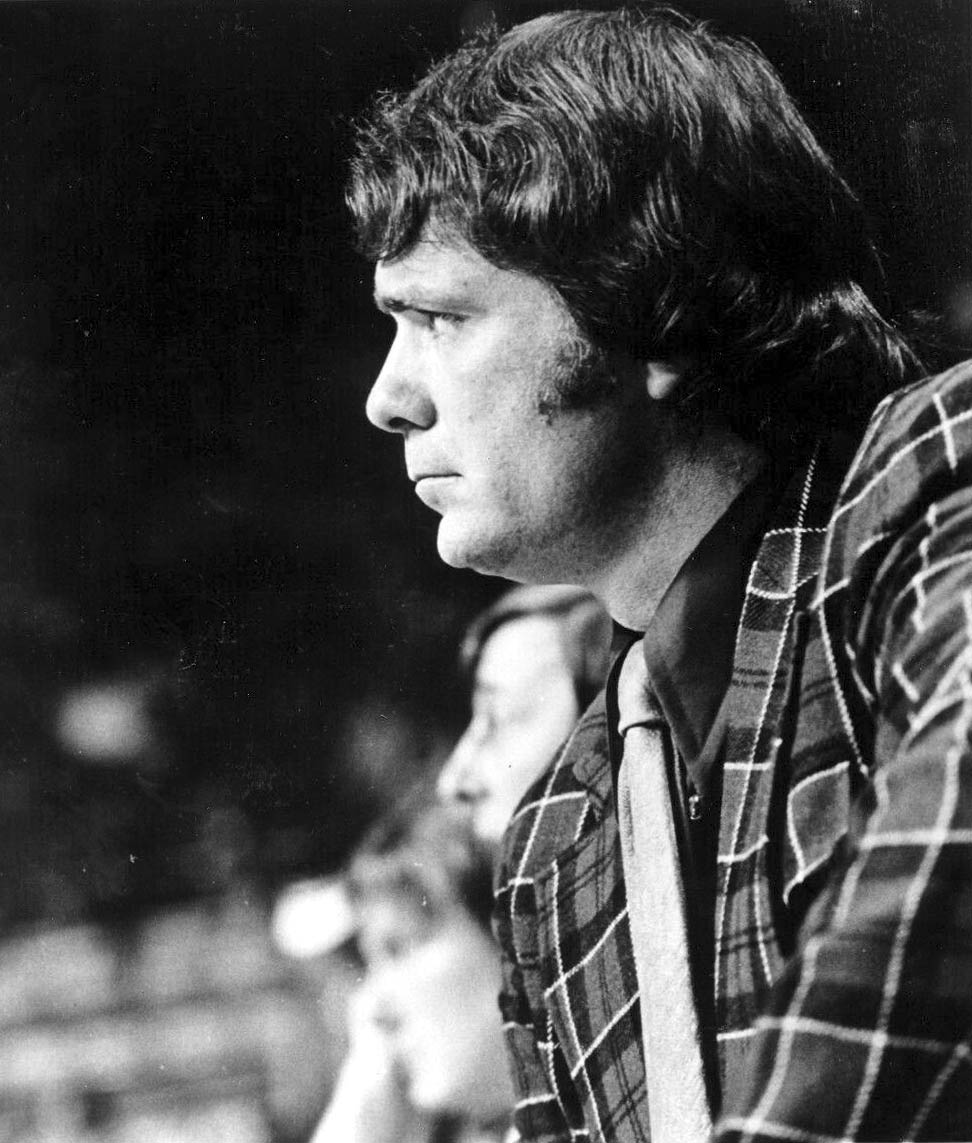
Heinsohn as Celtics' head coach in 1975

Heinsohn became the Celtics' head coach beginning in the 1969–70 season, following Bill Russell's retirement as both player and coach. Initially, the team missed Russell's impact, and the Celtics struggled in both 1969–70 and 1970–71, failing to reach the playoffs in both seasons.

The team broke through the following season, making the conference finals. Heinsohn then led the team to a league-best 68–14 record during the 1972–73 season and was named Coach of the Year, although Boston was upset in the playoffs by the eventual champion New York Knicks. To date, this is the best regular season record in Celtics history.

The next season Heinsohn and the Celtics won the championship, and they claimed another title in 1976. Between 1971–72 and 1975–76 seasons, the Celtics would win at least 50 games a season. The team would take a step back in the 1976–77 season, finishing 44–38, and was eliminated in the second round of the playoffs.

He was selected as the NBA All Star game coach 4 times in 1972-1974 and one more time in 1976.

The Celtics started poorly in the 1977–78 season, and were 11–23 after a loss to the Chicago Bulls in late December. Heinsohn would leave the team shortly thereafter, replaced by his former teammate and coaching assistant Tom "Satch" Sanders. He accumulated a career coaching record of 427–263.

On February 14, 2015, it was announced that Heinsohn would be inducted into the Basketball Hall of Fame for a second time as a coaching inductee. He is one of five members of the class of 2015 who were directly elected and is just one of four people to be inducted as both a player and coach.

== Broadcasting career ==
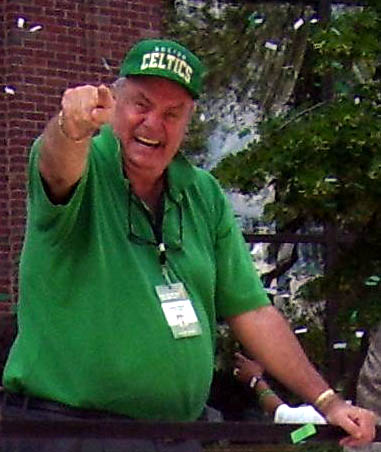
Heinsohn at the 2008 Celtics championship parade

Heinsohn's broadcasting career began in 1966, calling play-by-play for WKBG's Celtics broadcasts, after being asked by Red Auerbach. He spent three seasons in this role before becoming coach in 1969. From 1990 to 1999, Heinsohn was the Celtics' road play-by-play man on WFXT, WSBK and WABU. In 1981, Heinsohn joined Mike Gorman as color commentator on PRISM New England, which held the Celtics' television broadcasts. They became one of the longest-tenured tandems in sports broadcasting history. Occasionally, Bob Cousy made appearances with the tandem of Heinsohn and Gorman. On Celtics broadcasts, Heinsohn liked to point out players who displayed extra hustle to help the team by giving them "Tommy Points." One player in each game had exceptional play and hustle highlighted for the "Tommy Award” During broadcasts he was known for his sense of humor and indignantly questioning game officials when he felt calls against the Celtics were made in error. He continued to announce Celtics games all the way up till the 2019 season.

For a time in the 1980s, Heinsohn was in the same capacity during CBS's playoff coverage of the NBA (with Dick Stockton), calling four Finals from 1984 to 1987, three of which involved the Boston Celtics against the Los Angeles Lakers. Heinsohn also teamed with Brent Musburger, Verne Lundquist, and James Brown during his time with CBS. Heinsohn also called NCAA college basketball during the Men's Tournaments starting with the 1986–87 season, later devoting more time to calling college games for CBS than the pros, being used for regular season as well as tournament games until the 1990 NCAA men's basketball tournament. For NCAA games, Heinsohn was typically paired with Verne Lundquist. After the 1987 NBA season, Heinsohn was moved from the primary color analyst role to 2nd on the network's depth chart, being paired with Brent Musburger for the 1987–88 season, calling solely playoff games. Heinsohn in the 1988–89 season again only called playoff games, paired with Verne Lundquist. In his final season, Heinsohn called a regular-season game for CBS as well as early-round 1990 NBA playoff games with James Brown.

In 2016 Heinsohn alongside his broadcasting partner Mike Gorman were inducted into the Massachusetts Broadcasting Hall of Fame.

== Personal life and later career ==
Heinsohn was married to Diane Regenhard. Their marriage ended in divorce. Tom and Diane Heinsohn had three children: Paul, David, and Donna. He had 5 grandchildren: Danielle, Victoria, Brooke, Adrian, and Christopher. Heinsohn's second wife was Helen Weiss, who died in 2008.

Away from the court, Heinsohn enjoyed painting and playing golf; he once headed a life insurance company. In 1988, he wrote a memoir titled "Give 'em the Hook", with writer Joe Fitzgerald.

== Death and tribute ==
Heinsohn died at his home from kidney failure on November 9, 2020, at the age of 86.

Following the first Celtics game after Heinsohn’s death The Celtics sported black "Tommy" patches on their jerseys in his honor, The team also lowered eight of the franchise's 17 championship banners to court-level, each of them representing a significant part of Heinsohn's legacy with the Celtics. The team also held two “Tommy Heinsohn nights” in celebration of his life during the 2021 and 2022 seasons. The Celtics still give out “Tommy” Awards at the end of every game to the player that represents the best play/hustle.

== Awards and honors ==
The number-15 jersey was retired by the Boston Celtics in 1966.

- 10-time NBA Champion (eight as a player, two as a head coach)
- 1957 Rookie of the Year
- 6-time NBA All-Star
- 4-time NBA All Star game Coach
- 1973 Coach of the Year
- NBA Second Team selection (1961–1964)
- Two-time Naismith Memorial Basketball Hall of Fame inductee (as a player in 1986, and as a coach in 2015)
- Recipient of the 1995 Jack McMahon Award by the National Basketball Coaches Association
- New England Basketball Hall of Fame inductee (2002)
- The National Collegiate Basketball Hall of Fame inductee (2006)
- Recipient of the 2009 Chuck Daly Lifetime Achievement Award by the NBA Coaches Association
- Number 15 retired by the Boston Celtics.
- Number 24 retired by Holy Cross
- Holy Cross athletic’s Hall of Fame inductee (1962)

== NBA career statistics ==
Legend
GP	Games played	GS	Games started	MPG	Minutes per game
FG%	Field goal percentage	3P%	3-point field goal percentage	FT%	Free throw percentage
RPG	Rebounds per game	APG	Assists per game	SPG	Steals per game
BPG	Blocks per game	PPG	Points per game	**Bold**	Career high
†	Won an NBA championship

=== Regular season ===
Year	Team	GP	MPG	FG%	FT%	RPG	APG	PPG
1956–57†	Boston	72	29.9	.397	.790	9.8	1.6	16.2
1957–58	Boston	69	32.0	.382	.746	10.2	1.8	17.8
1958–59†	Boston	66	31.7	.390	.798	9.7	**2.5**	18.8
1959–60†	Boston	75	**32.3**	.423	.733	**10.6**	2.3	21.7
1960–61†	Boston	74	30.5	.400	.767	9.9	1.9	21.3
1961–62†	Boston	**79**	30.2	**.429**	.819	9.5	2.1	**22.1**
1962–63†	Boston	76	26.4	.423	**.835**	7.5	1.3	18.9
1963–64†	Boston	76	26.8	.398	.827	6.1	2.4	16.5
1964–65†	Boston	67	25.5	.383	.795	6.0	2.3	13.6
Career		654	29.4	.405	.790	8.8	2.0	18.6

=== Playoffs ===
Year	Team	GP	MPG	FG%	FT%	RPG	APG	PPG
1957†	Boston	10	**37.0**	.390	.710	**11.7**	2.0	22.9
1958	Boston	11	31.7	.351	.778	10.8	1.6	17.5
1959†	Boston	11	31.6	.414	.661	8.9	**2.9**	19.9
1960†	Boston	13	32.5	.419	.750	9.7	2.1	21.8
1961†	Boston	10	29.1	.408	.767	9.9	2.0	19.7
1962†	Boston	**14**	31.8	.399	.763	8.2	2.4	20.7
1963†	Boston	13	31.8	**.456**	.765	8.9	1.2	**24.7**
1964†	Boston	10	30.8	.389	**.810**	8.0	2.6	17.4
1965†	Boston	12	23.0	.365	.625	7.0	1.9	12.7
Career		104	31.0	.402	.743	9.2	2.1	19.8

== Coaching record ==
Legend
Regular season	G	Games coached	W	Games won	L	Games lost	W–L %	Win–loss %
Playoffs	PG	Playoff games	PW	Playoff wins	PL	Playoff losses	PW–L %	Playoff win–loss %

Team	Year	G	W	L	W–L%	Finish	PG	PW	PL	PW–L%	Result
Boston	1969–70	82	34	48	.415	6th in Eastern					Missed playoffs
Boston	1970–71	82	44	38	.537	3rd in Eastern					Missed playoffs
Boston	1971–72	82	56	26	.683	4th in Eastern	11	5	6	.455	Lost in Conference finals
Boston	1972–73	82	68	14	.829	1st in Atlantic	13	7	6	.538	Lost in Conference finals
Boston	1973–74	82	56	26	.683	1st in Atlantic	18	12	6	.667	Won NBA Championship
Boston	1974–75	82	60	22	.732	1st in Atlantic	11	6	5	.545	Lost in Conference finals
Boston	1975–76	82	54	28	.659	1st in Atlantic	18	12	6	.667	Won NBA Championship
Boston	1976–77	82	44	38	.537	2nd in Atlantic	9	5	4	.556	Lost in Conference semifinals
Boston	1977–78	34	11	23	.324	3rd in Atlantic					(released)
Career		690	427	263	.619		80	47	33	.588	

== See also ==
- List of NCAA Division I men's basketball players with 30 or more rebounds in a game
- List of NBA players with most championships

Preceded by Bill Russell	NBA Finals television color commentator 1984–1987	Succeeded by Billy Cunningham
