= 1953 NBA Finals =

1953 basketball championship series

Team	Coach	Wins
Minneapolis Lakers	John Kundla	4
New York Knickerbockers	Joe Lapchick	1
- Dates: April 4–10
- Hall of Famers: Lakers: George Mikan (1959); Jim Pollard (1978); Slater Martin (1982); Vern Mikkelsen (1995); Knicks: Harry Gallatin (1991); Al McGuire (1992, coach); Dick McGuire (1993); Nat Clifton (2014); Carl Braun (2019); Coaches: Joe Lapchick (1966, player); John Kundla (1995)
- Eastern finals: Knickerbockers defeated Celtics, 3–1
- Western finals: Lakers defeated Pistons, 3–2

The 1953 NBA World Championship Series was the championship round of the 1953 NBA playoffs, which concluded the National Basketball Association (NBA)'s 1952–53 season. The Western Division champion Minneapolis Lakers faced the Eastern Division champion New York Knickerbockers in a best-of-seven series with Minneapolis having home-court advantage. By winning four games to one, the Lakers won their fifth title in six years dating from 1948, the club's final season in the National Basketball League.

The five games were played in seven days, beginning Saturday and Sunday, April 4 and 5, in Minneapolis and concluding there on the following Friday. Meanwhile, two mid-week games were played in New York City. The entire postseason tournament spanned 25 days in which Minneapolis played 12 games, New York 11.

== Series summary ==
Game	Date	Home team	Result	Road team
Game 1	April 4	Minneapolis Lakers	88–96 (0–1)	New York Knickerbockers
Game 2	April 5	Minneapolis Lakers	73–71 (1–1)	New York Knickerbockers
Game 3	April 7	New York Knickerbockers	75–90 (1–2)	Minneapolis Lakers
Game 4	April 8	New York Knickerbockers	69–72 (1–3)	Minneapolis Lakers
Game 5	April 10	New York Knickerbockers	84–91 (1–4)	Minneapolis Lakers

Lakers win series 4–1

== Team rosters ==
=== Minneapolis Lakers ===
1952–53 Minneapolis Lakers roster
Players

Pos.	No.	Player	Height	Weight	DOB	From
SG	16	Bob Harrison	6 ft 1 in (1.85 m)	190 lb (86 kg)	1927-08-12	Michigan
PF	11	Lew Hitch	6 ft 8 in (2.03 m)	200 lb (91 kg)	1929-07-16	Kansas State
SF	12, 13	Jim Holstein	6 ft 3 in (1.91 m)	180 lb (82 kg)	1930-09-24	Cincinnati
PG	22	Slater Martin	5 ft 10 in (1.78 m)	170 lb (77 kg)	1925-10-22	Texas
C	99	George Mikan	6 ft 10 in (2.08 m)	245 lb (111 kg)	1924-06-18	DePaul
PF	19	Vern Mikkelsen	6 ft 7 in (2.01 m)	230 lb (104 kg)	1928-10-21	Hamline
SF	17	Jim Pollard	6 ft 4 in (1.93 m)	185 lb (84 kg)	1922-07-09	Stanford
SG	18	Pep Saul	6 ft 2 in (1.88 m)	185 lb (84 kg)	1924-02-16	Seton Hall
F		Dick Schnittker	6 ft 5 in (1.96 m)	200 lb (91 kg)	1928-05-27	Ohio State
PF	12	Howie Schultz	6 ft 6 in (1.98 m)	200 lb (91 kg)	1922-07-03	Hamline
SG	20	Whitey Skoog	5 ft 11 in (1.80 m)	180 lb (82 kg)	1926-11-02	Minnesota

Coaches
Head coach
- John Kundla

Legend
- (DP) Unsigned draft pick
- (FA) Free agent
- (S) Suspended
- Injured

Roster

=== New York Knickerbockers ===
1952–53 New York Knicks roster
Players

Pos.	No.	Player	Height	Weight	DOB	From
SF	12	Vince Boryla	6 ft 5 in (1.96 m)	210 lb (95 kg)	1927-03-11	Denver
SG	4	Carl Braun	6 ft 5 in (1.96 m)	180 lb (82 kg)	1927-09-25	Colgate
PF	8	Nat Clifton	6 ft 6 in (1.98 m)	220 lb (100 kg)	1922-10-13	Xavier (LA)
G/F		Jerry Fleishman	6 ft 2 in (1.88 m)	190 lb (86 kg)	1922-02-14	NYU
PF	11	Harry Gallatin	6 ft 6 in (1.98 m)	210 lb (95 kg)	1927-04-26	Truman State
PG	3, 16	Al McGuire	6 ft 2 in (1.88 m)	180 lb (82 kg)	1928-09-07	St. John's
PG	15	Dick McGuire	6 ft 0 in (1.83 m)	180 lb (82 kg)	1926-01-25	St. John's
G	5	Sherwin Raiken	6 ft 2 in (1.88 m)	185 lb (84 kg)	1928-10-29	Villanova
C	18	Connie Simmons	6 ft 8 in (2.03 m)	222 lb (101 kg)	1925-03-15	Flushing High School
SF	14, 17	Dick Surhoff	6 ft 4 in (1.93 m)	210 lb (95 kg)	1929-11-16	Long Island
SF	9	Ernie Vandeweghe	6 ft 3 in (1.91 m)	195 lb (88 kg)	1928-09-12	Colgate

Coaches
Head coach
- Joe Lapchick

Legend
- (DP) Unsigned draft pick
- (FA) Free agent
- (S) Suspended
- Injured

Roster

== Game summaries ==
April 4

Boxscore

New York Knickerbockers 96, Minneapolis Lakers 88
Scoring by quarter: 19–18, 24–29, 23–20, 30–21
Pts: Carl Braun 21	Pts: George Mikan 25
New York leads series, 1–0

Minneapolis Auditorium, Minneapolis, Minnesota
Attendance: 5,000
Referees: Sid Borgia, Arnie Heft

April 5

Boxscore

New York Knickerbockers 71, Minneapolis Lakers 73
Scoring by quarter: 16–26, 14–21, 24–11, 17–15
Pts: Connie Simmons 17	Pts: George Mikan 18
Series tied, 1–1

Minneapolis Auditorium, Minneapolis, Minnesota
Attendance: 4,848
Referees: Sid Borgia, Arnie Heft

April 7

Boxscore

Minneapolis Lakers 90, New York Knickerbockers 75
Scoring by quarter: 21–14, 18–24, 26–22, 25–15
Pts: George Mikan 20	Pts: Connie Simmons 18
Minneapolis leads series, 2–1

69th Regiment Armory, Manhattan, New York
Attendance: 5,100

April 8

Boxscore

Minneapolis Lakers 71, New York Knickerbockers 69
Scoring by quarter: 21–16, 20–18, 13–16, 17–19
Pts: George Mikan 27	Pts: Connie Simmons 17
Minneapolis leads series, 3–1

69th Regiment Armory, Manhattan, New York
Attendance: 5,200

April 10

Boxscore

Minneapolis Lakers 91, New York Knickerbockers 84
Scoring by quarter: 19–18, 25–17, 25–25, 22–24
Pts: Jim Pollard 17; Asts: Vern Mikkelsen 6	Pts: Carl Braun 19; Asts: Ernie Vandeweghe 4
Minneapolis wins series, 4–1

69th Regiment Armory, Manhattan, New York
Attendance: 5,200
