= Dick Bunt =

American basketball player (1929–2021)

Personal information
- Born: July 13, 1929 Queens, New York, U.S.
- Died: February 10, 2021 (aged 91) Purdys, New York, U.S.
- Listed height: 6 ft 0 in (1.83 m)
- Listed weight: 170 lb (77 kg)

Career information
- High school: Bayside (Queens, New York)
- College: NYU (1949–1952)
- NBA draft: 1952: 3rd round, 25th overall pick
- Drafted by: New York Knicks
- Playing career: 1952–1953
- Position: Point guard
- Number: 9
- Coaching career: 1955–1959

Career history

Playing
- 1952: New York Knicks
- 1952: Manchester British-Americans
- 1952–1953: Baltimore Bullets

Coaching
- 1955–1956: Richmond Hill HS
- 1956–1959: Bryant HS
- Stats at NBA.com
- Stats at Basketball Reference

Richard J. Bunt (July 13, 1929 – February 10, 2021) was an American basketball player who played in the National Basketball Association (NBA) during the 1952–53 season.

He played collegiately for New York University and was selected by the New York Knicks in the 1952 NBA draft.

Bunt played for the Knicks and Baltimore Bullets in the NBA for 26 games. After he finished his NBA career, he was a physical education teacher at William C. Bryant High School in Astoria, Queens, New York.

Bunt died on February 10, 2021, at age 91, in Purdys, New York.

== Career statistics ==
Legend
GP	Games played	GS	Games started	MPG	Minutes per game
FG%	Field goal percentage	3P%	3-point field goal percentage	FT%	Free throw percentage
RPG	Rebounds per game	APG	Assists per game	SPG	Steals per game
BPG	Blocks per game	PPG	Points per game	**Bold**	Career high

=== NBA ===
==== Regular season ====
Year	Team	GP	MPG	FG%	FT%	RPG	APG	PPG
1952–53	New York	**14**	**10.4**	.226	.680	.9	**.7**	2.9
1952–53	Baltimore	12	**10.4**	**.327**	**.739**	**1.3**	.6	**4.3**
Career		26	10.4	.276	.708	1.1	.7	3.5

=== Playoffs ===
Year	Team	GP	MPG	FG%	FT%	RPG	APG	PPG
1953	Baltimore	1	1.0	–	–	.0	.0	.0
