= Don Henriksen =

Professional basketball player

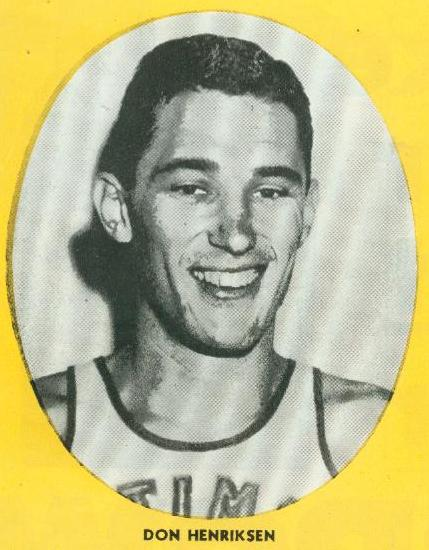
- Henriksen as a member of the Baltimore Bullets.

Personal information
- Born: October 10, 1929 Santa Clara, California, U.S.
- Died: May 14, 2008 (aged 78)
- Listed height: 6 ft 7 in (2.01 m)
- Listed weight: 225 lb (102 kg)

Career information
- College: California (1949–1950)
- Playing career: 1952–1955
- Position: Center / power forward
- Number: 16, 17, 12

Career history
- 1952–1953, 1954–1955: Baltimore Bullets
- 1955: Rochester Royals
- Stats at NBA.com
- Stats at Basketball Reference

Donald Anton Henriksen (October 10, 1929 – May 14, 2008) was an American professional basketball power forward–center who spent two seasons in the National Basketball Association (NBA) as a member of the Baltimore Bullets and the Rochester Royals. He attended the University of California.

== Career statistics ==
Legend
GP	Games played	GS	Games started	MPG	Minutes per game
FG%	Field goal percentage	3P%	3-point field goal percentage	FT%	Free throw percentage
RPG	Rebounds per game	APG	Assists per game	SPG	Steals per game
BPG	Blocks per game	PPG	Points per game	**Bold**	Career high

=== NBA ===
==== Regular season ====
Year	Team	GP	MPG	FG%	FT%	RPG	APG	PPG
1952–53	Baltimore	**68**	**33.3**	**.419**	.626	7.4	1.9	**8.4**
1954–55	Baltimore	14	30.6	.308	**.785**	3.5	**2.3**	7.6
1954–55	Rochester	56	22.1	.352	.662	**7.8**	1.4	5.5
Career		138	28.5	.384	.658	7.2	1.7	7.2

=== Playoffs ===
Year	Team	GP	MPG	FG%	FT%	RPG	APG	PPG
1953	Baltimore	2	**47.0**	**.667**	.556	**12.0**	**4.0**	**12.5**
1955	Rochester	**3**	23.3	.250	**.700**	5.3	1.0	4.3
Career		5	32.8	.481	.632	8.0	2.2	7.6
