= 1952–53 Syracuse Nationals season =

Season for the Nationals in the National Basketball Association

- Head coach: Al Cervi
- Arena: Onondaga War Memorial

Results
- Record: 47–24 (.662)
- Place: Division: 2nd (Eastern)
- Playoff finish: East Division Semifinals (eliminated 0–2)
- Stats at Basketball Reference

The 1952–53 Syracuse Nationals season was the Nationals' 4th season in the NBA.

== Roster ==
1952–53 Syracuse Nationals roster
Players

Pos.	No.	Player	Height	Weight	DOB	From
G		Jim Brasco	6 ft 1 in (1.85 m)	170 lb (77 kg)	1931-02-03	NYU
G/F		Al Cervi	5 ft 11 in (1.80 m)	170 lb (77 kg)	1917-02-12	East HS (NY)
G/F		Bill Gabor	5 ft 11 in (1.80 m)	170 lb (77 kg)	1922-05-13	Syracuse
C		Noble Jorgensen	6 ft 9 in (2.06 m)	228 lb (103 kg)	1925-05-18	Iowa
G		George King	6 ft 0 in (1.83 m)	175 lb (79 kg)	1928-08-16	College of Charleston
F/C		Earl Lloyd	6 ft 5 in (1.96 m)	200 lb (91 kg)	1928-04-03	West Virginia State
F		Bob Lochmueller	6 ft 5 in (1.96 m)	185 lb (84 kg)	1927-06-05	Louisville
F/C		Wally Osterkorn	6 ft 4 in (1.93 m)	205 lb (93 kg)	1928-07-06	Illinois
F/C		Red Rocha	6 ft 8 in (2.03 m)	185 lb (84 kg)	1923-09-18	Oregon State
F/C		Dolph Schayes	6 ft 7 in (2.01 m)	195 lb (88 kg)	1928-05-19	NYU
G/F		Paul Seymour	6 ft 1 in (1.85 m)	180 lb (82 kg)	1928-01-30	Toledo

Coaches
Head coach

Al Cervi

Legend
- (DP) Unsigned draft pick
- (FA) Free agent
- (S) Suspended
- Injured

Roster

== Regular season ==
=== Season standings ===
Eastern Division	W	L	PCT	GB	Home	Road	Neutral	Div
x-New York Knicks	47	23	.671	-	22-4	15-14	10-5	30-10
x-Syracuse Nationals	47	24	.662	0.5	32-2	10-20	5-2	26-15
x-Boston Celtics	46	25	.648	1.5	21-3	11-18	14-4	28-13
x-Baltimore Bullets	16	54	.229	31	11-20	1–19	4-15	10-30
Philadelphia Warriors	12	57	.174	34.5	5-12	1–28	6-17	7-33

x – clinched playoff spot

=== Game log ===
1952–53 Game log
#	Date	Opponent	Score	High points	Record
1	November 1	@ Philadelphia	84–86 (OT)	Lochmueller, Schayes (17)	0–1
2	November 2	Philadelphia	91–117	Gabor, Schayes (24)	1–1
3	November 8	@ Boston	83–106	Billy Gabor (14)	1–2
4	November 9	Minneapolis	89–96	Dolph Schayes (27)	2–2
5	November 13	Boston	81–96	Dolph Schayes (23)	3–2
6	November 15	@ Baltimore	91–97 (OT)	Bill Calhoun (18)	3–3
7	November 16	Indianapolis	78–84	Dolph Schayes (27)	4–3
8	November 20	Milwaukee	73–92	Billy Gabor (15)	5–3
9	November 22	@ New York	68–98	Dolph Schayes (13)	5–4
10	November 23	New York	73–76	Dolph Schayes (14)	6–4
11	November 27	Rochester	79–86	Paul Seymour (17)	7–4
12	November 29	@ Baltimore	87–74	King, Rocha (16)	8–4
13	November 30	Boston	66–78	Paul Seymour (23)	9–4
14	December 4	@ Fort Wayne	78–70	Dolph Schayes (18)	10–4
15	December 6	@ Philadelphia	82–74	Paul Seymour (20)	11–4
16	December 7	Milwaukee	67–71	Red Rocha (15)	12–4
17	December 8	@ Milwaukee	89–101	Billy Gabor (14)	12–5
18	December 9	@ Indianapolis	87–70	Dolph Schayes (21)	13–5
19	December 11	@ Minneapolis	79–82	Billy Gabor (16)	13–6
20	December 14	Philadelphia	83–102	Dolph Schayes (20)	14–6
21	December 16	@ New York	93–98 (OT)	Billy Gabor (21)	14–7
22	December 18	N Boston	83–88	Dolph Schayes (20)	14–8
23	December 20	@ Boston	77–91	Dolph Schayes (19)	14–9
24	December 21	Boston	86–90	Dolph Schayes (28)	15–9
25	December 25	Baltimore	92–102	George King (18)	16–9
26	December 27	@ Baltimore	81–76 (OT)	Rocha, Seymour (18)	17–9
27	December 28	Indianapolis	73–84	Red Rocha (18)	18–9
28	December 30	@ Rochester	93–106	Red Rocha (18)	18–10
29	December 31	@ Boston	87–97	Al Cervi (19)	18–11
30	January 1	Fort Wayne	78–92	Dolph Schayes (29)	19–11
31	January 3	@ New York	77–85 (OT)	Paul Seymour (17)	19–12
32	January 4	Baltimore	68–93	Red Rocha (15)	20–12
33	January 7	N New York	114–93	Paul Seymour (29)	21–12
34	January 8	Minneapolis	67–75	Dolph Schayes (19)	22–12
35	January 10	N Philadelphia	87–77	Paul Seymour (19)	23–12
36	January 11	Philadelphia	72–76	Paul Seymour (18)	24–12
37	January 15	Rochester	85–109	Paul Seymour (19)	25–12
38	January 18	Baltimore	84–103	Paul Seymour (24)	26–12
39	January 22	Fort Wayne	75–87	Red Rocha (17)	27–12
40	January 24	@ Rochester	107–82	Dolph Schayes (22)	28–12
41	January 25	New York	97–62	Dolph Schayes (16)	28–13
42	January 27	@ Indianapolis	72–76	Jorgensen, Schayes (21)	28–14
43	January 29	@ Minneapolis	83–65	Paul Seymour (20)	29–14
44	January 30	@ Milwaukee	68–84	King, Schayes (15)	29–15
45	February 1	Baltimore	79–94	Dolph Schayes (22)	30–15
46	February 2	N Baltimore	98–77	Red Rocha (31)	31–15
47	February 4	@ Boston	92–105	Paul Seymour (20)	31–16
48	February 5	Rochester	79–83 (OT)	Dolph Schayes (24)	32–16
49	February 8	Philadelphia	89–98	Dolph Schayes (26)	33–16
50	February 11	@ Fort Wayne	78–96	Paul Seymour (17)	33–17
51	February 12	@ Minneapolis	81–91	Paul Seymour (20)	33–18
52	February 13	@ Indianapolis	89–86 (2OT)	Dolph Schayes (20)	34–18
53	February 15	New York	85–81	Dolph Schayes (35)	34–19
54	February 17	N Boston	84–65	Red Rocha (21)	35–19
55	February 19	Milwaukee	72–82	Dolph Schayes (21)	36–19
56	February 21	@ Rochester	73–84	Dolph Schayes (24)	36–20
57	February 22	Philadelphia	73–86	Dolph Schayes (23)	37–20
58	February 24	N Philadelphia	74–63	Dolph Schayes (27)	38–20
59	February 26	Fort Wayne	77–89	Dolph Schayes (19)	39–20
60	February 28	@ Baltimore	74–77	Dolph Schayes (18)	39–21
61	March 1	New York	64–79	Dolph Schayes (28)	40–21
62	March 3	@ Milwaukee	70–75	George King (19)	40–22
63	March 4	@ Fort Wayne	75–73 (2OT)	Dolph Schayes (18)	41–22
64	March 5	Minneapolis	91–94	Lloyd, Seymour (23)	42–22
65	March 6	@ New York	66–75	Dolph Schayes (19)	42–23
66	March 7	N Philadelphia	87–88	Dolph Schayes (30)	42–24
67	March 8	Baltimore	91–98	Dolph Schayes (28)	43–24
68	March 12	Boston	70–84	Dolph Schayes (18)	44–24
69	March 14	@ New York	95–81	Dolph Schayes (26)	45–24
70	March 15	Indianapolis	68–84	Dolph Schayes (30)	46–24
71	March 17	Boston	68–72	Dolph Schayes (23)	47–24

== Playoffs ==
1953 playoff game log
Division Semifinals: 0–2 (home: 0–1; road: 0–1)

Game	Date	Team	Score	High points	High assists	Location	Series
1	March 19	Boston	L 81–87	Paul Seymour (18)	—	Onondaga War Memorial	0–1
2	March 21	@ Boston	L 105–111 (4OT)	Red Rocha (19)	George King (4)	Boston Garden	0–2

1953 schedule

== Player statistics ==
Legend
GP	Games played	GS	Games started	MPG	Minutes per game
FG%	Field-goal percentage	3P%	3-point field-goal percentage	FT%	Free-throw percentage
RPG	Rebounds per game	APG	Assists per game	SPG	Steals per game
BPG	Blocks per game	PPG	Points per game

== Awards and records ==
- Dolph Schayes, All-NBA First Team
