= Ralph Polson =

American basketball player (1929–2022)

Personal information
- Born: October 26, 1929 Riverside, California, U.S.
- Died: May 6, 2022 (aged 92) Spokane Valley, Washington, U.S.
- Listed height: 6 ft 7 in (2.01 m)
- Listed weight: 200 lb (91 kg)

Career information
- College: Riverside CC (1948–1950); Whitworth (1950–1952)
- NBA draft: 1952: 1st round, 5th overall pick
- Drafted by: New York Knicks
- Position: Power forward / center
- Number: 6, 15

Career history
- 1952: New York Knicks
- 1952–1953: Philadelphia Warriors
- 1953: Manchester British-Americans
- Stats at NBA.com
- Stats at Basketball Reference

Ralph Mathewson Polson (October 26, 1929 – May 6, 2022) was an American National Basketball Association (NBA) player. Polson was drafted with the fifth pick in the first round of the 1952 NBA draft. On December 11, 1952, Polson was sold from the Knicks to the Philadelphia Warriors. In Polson's one NBA season, he averaged 3.9 points and 4.3 rebounds per game. Polson died in Spokane Valley, Washington on May 6, 2022, at the age of 92.

== Career statistics ==
Legend
GP	Games played	GS	Games started	MPG	Minutes per game
FG%	Field goal percentage	3P%	3-point field goal percentage	FT%	Free throw percentage
RPG	Rebounds per game	APG	Assists per game	SPG	Steals per game
BPG	Blocks per game	PPG	Points per game	**Bold**	Career high

=== NBA ===
==== Regular season ====
Year	Team	GP	MPG	FG%	FT%	RPG	APG	PPG
1952–53	New York	3	12.3	.333	**.667**	2.7	**.7**	3.3
1952–53	Philadelphia	**46**	**16.8**	**.365**	.633	**4.4**	.5	**3.9**
Career		49	16.5	.363	.635	4.3	.5	3.9
