= Jim Holstein =

American basketball player and coach

Personal information
- Born: September 24, 1930 Hamilton, Ohio, U.S.
- Died: December 16, 2007 (aged 77) Bradenton, Florida, U.S.
- Listed height: 6 ft 3 in (1.91 m)
- Listed weight: 180 lb (82 kg)

Career information
- High school: Hamilton Catholic (Hamilton, Ohio)
- College: Cincinnati (1949–1952)
- NBA draft: 1952: 6th round, 59th overall pick
- Drafted by: Minneapolis Lakers
- Playing career: 1952–1956
- Position: Small forward
- Number: 13, 12, 10
- Coaching career: 1961–1993

Career history

Playing
- 1952–1955: Minneapolis Lakers
- 1955–1956: Fort Wayne Pistons

Coaching
- 1961–1972: Saint Joseph's (Indiana)
- 1972–1977: Ball State
- 1977–1993: Saint Francis

Career highlights
- 2× NBA champion (1953, 1954); 3× First-team All-MAC (1950–1952)
- Stats at NBA.com
- Stats at Basketball Reference

James H. Holstein (September 24, 1930 – December 16, 2007) was an American professional basketball player and coach.

A 6'3" swingman from the University of Cincinnati, where he was a consensus All-American, Holstein played four seasons (1952–1956) in the National Basketball Association as a member of the Minneapolis Lakers and Fort Wayne Pistons. He averaged 3.8 points per game and won 3 NBA championships with the Lakers.

Following his NBA career, Holstein was a college basketball coach; he spent 11 seasons at Saint Joseph's College in Rensselaer, Indiana. He left Saint Joseph's to assume the head coaching job at Ball State University. Holstein's final coaching stop was as head coach at the University of St. Francis in Fort Wayne, Indiana from 1978 to 1993.

== Career playing statistics ==
Legend
GP	Games played	GS	Games started	MPG	Minutes per game
FG%	Field goal percentage	3P%	3-point field goal percentage	FT%	Free throw percentage
RPG	Rebounds per game	APG	Assists per game	SPG	Steals per game
BPG	Blocks per game	PPG	Points per game	**Bold**	Career high
†	Won an NBA championship	*	Led the league

=== NBA ===
==== Regular season ====
Year	Team	GP	MPG	FG%	FT%	RPG	APG	PPG
1952–53†	Minneapolis	66	15.0	**.358**	.667	2.6	1.1	4.0
1953–54†	Minneapolis	**70**	**16.5**	.306	.571	2.9	1.1	3.4
1954–55	Minneapolis	62	15.8	.324	**.713**	**3.3**	.9	**4.5**
1955–56	Fort Wayne	27	13.0	.270	.649	2.8	**1.4**	2.7
Career		225	15.4	.323	.647	2.9	1.1	3.8

==== Playoffs ====
Year	Team	GP	MPG	FG%	FT%	RPG	APG	PPG
1953†	Minneapolis	12*	16.0	**.476**	.522	2.5	**.9**	4.3
1954†	Minneapolis	**13***	14.5	.306	.696	2.7	.8	3.5
1955	Minneapolis	7	**16.7**	.421	**.889**	**4.3**	**.9**	**5.7**
Career		32	15.5	.395	.655	3.0	.9	4.3
