= List of 1955–56 NBA season transactions =

This is a list of all personnel changes for the 1955 NBA off-season and 1955–56 NBA season.

== Events ==
=== September 30, 1955 ===
- The Fort Wayne Pistons traded Monk Meineke to the Rochester Royals for Odie Spears.

=== October 25, 1955 ===
- The Rochester Royals signed Connie Simmons as a free agent.

=== October 26, 1955 ===
- The Rochester Royals sold Arnie Risen to the Boston Celtics.

=== November 28, 1955 ===
- The Minneapolis Lakers sold Jim Holstein to the Fort Wayne Pistons.

=== December 3, 1955 ===
- The Philadelphia Warriors sold Bob Schafer to the St. Louis Hawks.

=== December 16, 1955 ===
The Fort Wayne Pistons sold Johnny Horan to the Minneapolis Lakers.

=== ? ===
- The Fort Wayne Pistons signed Alex Hannum as a free agent.

=== January ?, 1956 ===
- The St. Louis Hawks released Chuck Cooper.
- The Fort Wayne Pistons signed Chuck Cooper as a free agent.

=== January 27, 1956 ===
- Joe Lapchick resigns as head coach for New York Knicks.

=== February 9, 1956 ===
- The New York Knicks hired Vince Boryla as head coach.

=== April 30, 1956 ===
- The Boston Celtics traded Cliff Hagan and Ed Macauley to the St. Louis Hawks for Bill Russell.
- The New York Knicks traded Gene Shue to the Fort Wayne Pistons for Ron Sobie.

== Notes ==
- ^{a} Number of years played in the NBA prior to the draft
- ^{b} Career with the franchise that drafted the player
- ^{c} Never played a game for the franchise
