= List of NBA career minutes played leaders =

This article provides two lists：

A list of National Basketball Association players by total career regular season leaders in minutes played.

A progressive list of leaders and records for minutes played showing how the record has increased through the years.

== Minutes played leaders ==
This is a list of National Basketball Association players by total career regular season leaders in minutes played.

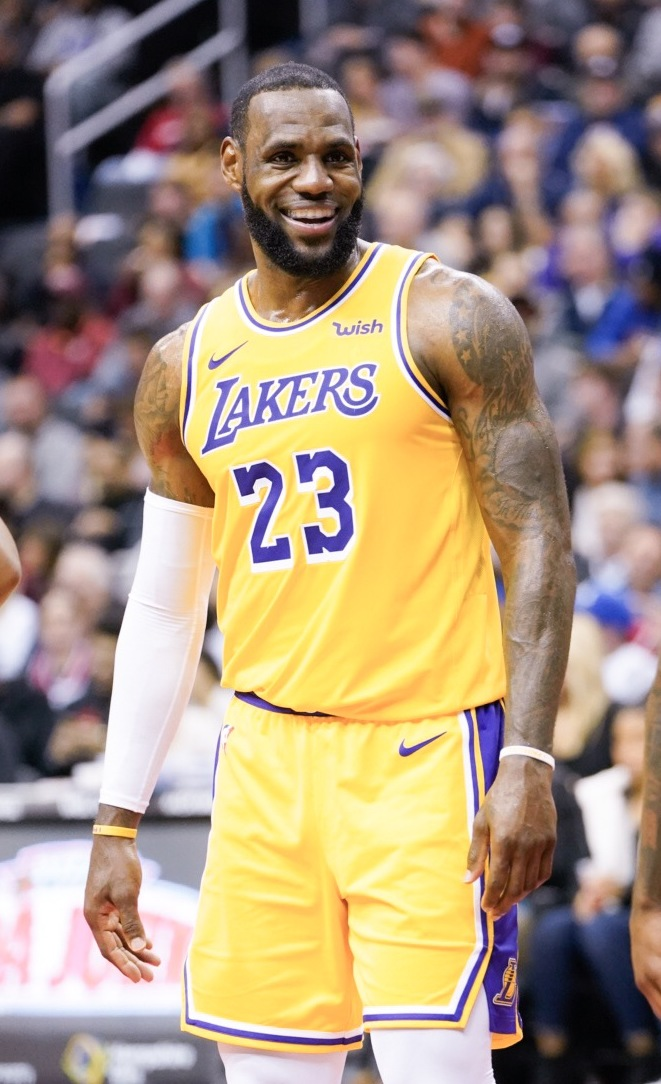
LeBron James has played the most minutes in NBA history.

^	Active NBA player
*	Inducted into the Naismith Memorial Basketball Hall of Fame
†	Not yet eligible for Hall of Fame consideration (Note: A player is not eligible for induction into the Naismith Memorial Basketball Hall of Fame until he has been fully retired for two calendar years.)

Statistics accurate as of November 18, 2026.

Rank	Player	Position(s)	Team(s) played for (years) (Note: American Basketball Association (ABA) teams other than those admitted into the NBA in 1976 are not included; each year is linked to an article about that particular NBA season. The years listed are only ones in which the player played in a playoff game.)	Total minutes	Games played	Minutes per game average (Note: Average is rounded to the nearest tenth.)
1	LeBron James^	SF	Cleveland Cavaliers (2003–2010, 2014–2018); Miami Heat (2010–2014); Los Angeles Lakers (2018–2026); Philadelphia 76ers (2026–present)	61,419	1,634	37.6
2	Kareem Abdul-Jabbar*	C	Milwaukee Bucks (1969–1975); Los Angeles Lakers (1975–1989)	57,446	1,560	36.8
3	Karl Malone*	PF	Utah Jazz (1985–2003); Los Angeles Lakers (2003–2004)	54,852	1,476	37.2
4	Dirk Nowitzki*	PF	Dallas Mavericks (1998–2019)	51,368	1,522	33.8
5	Kevin Garnett*	PF	Minnesota Timberwolves (1995–2007, 2015–2016); Boston Celtics (2007–2013); Brooklyn Nets (2013–2015)	50,418	1,462	34.5
6	Jason Kidd*	PG	Dallas Mavericks (1994–1996, 2008–2012); Phoenix Suns (1996–2001); New Jersey Nets (2001–2008); New York Knicks (2012–2013)	50,111	1,391	36.0
7	Elvin Hayes*	PF/C	San Diego/Houston Rockets (1968–1972, 1981–1984); Baltimore/Capital/Washington Bullets (1972–1981)	50,000	1,303	38.4
8	Kobe Bryant*	SG	Los Angeles Lakers (1996–2016)	48,637	1,346	36.1
9	Wilt Chamberlain*	C	Philadelphia/San Francisco Warriors (1959–1965); Philadelphia 76ers (1965–1968); Los Angeles Lakers (1968–1973)	47,859	1,045	45.8
10	John Stockton*	PG	Utah Jazz (1984–2003)	47,764	1,504	31.8
11	Reggie Miller*	SG	Indiana Pacers (1987–2005)	47,619	1,389	34.3
12	Tim Duncan*	PF/C	San Antonio Spurs (1997–2016)	47,368	1,392	34.0
13	Gary Payton*	PG	Seattle SuperSonics (1990–2003); Milwaukee Bucks (2003); Los Angeles Lakers (2003–2004); Boston Celtics (2004–2005); Miami Heat (2005–2007)	47,117	1,335	35.3
14	John Havlicek*	SF/SG	Boston Celtics (1962–1978)	46,471	1,270	36.6
15	Vince Carter*	SG/SF	Toronto Raptors (1998–2004); New Jersey Nets (2004–2009); Orlando Magic (2009–2010); Phoenix Suns (2010–2011); Dallas Mavericks (2011–2014); Memphis Grizzlies (2014–2017); Sacramento Kings (2017–2018); Atlanta Hawks (2018–2020)	46,367	1,541	30.1
16	Ray Allen*	SG	Milwaukee Bucks (1996–2003); Seattle SuperSonics (2003–2007); Boston Celtics (2007–2012); Miami Heat (2012–2014)	46,344	1,300	35.6
17	Paul Pierce*	SF/SG	Boston Celtics (1998–2013); Brooklyn Nets (2013–2014); Washington Wizards (2014–2015); Los Angeles Clippers (2015–2017)	45,880	1,343	34.2
18	Chris Paul^{†}	PG	New Orleans Hornets (2005–2011); Los Angeles Clippers (2011–2017, 2025–2026); Houston Rockets (2017–2019); Oklahoma City Thunder (2019–2020); Phoenix Suns (2020–2024); Golden State Warriors (2023–2024); San Antonio Spurs (2024–2025)	45,837	1,370	33.5
19	Robert Parish*	C	Golden State Warriors (1976–1980); Boston Celtics (1980–1994); Charlotte Hornets (1994–1996); Chicago Bulls (1996–1997)	45,704	1,611	28.4
20	Moses Malone*	C	Buffalo Braves (1976); Houston Rockets (1976–1982); Philadelphia 76ers (1982–1986, 1993–1994); Washington Bullets (1986–1988); Atlanta Hawks (1988–1991); Milwaukee Bucks (1991–1993); San Antonio Spurs (1994–1995)	45,071	1,329	33.9
21	Kevin Durant^	SF/PF	Seattle SuperSonics/Oklahoma City Thunder (2007–2016); Golden State Warriors (2016–2019); Brooklyn Nets (2019–2023); Phoenix Suns (2023–2025); Houston Rockets (2025–present)	44,611	1,217	36.7
22	Joe Johnson	SG/SF	Boston Celtics (2001–2002, 2021–2022); Phoenix Suns (2002–2005); Atlanta Hawks (2005–2012); Brooklyn Nets (2012–2016); Miami Heat (2016); Utah Jazz (2016–2018); Houston Rockets (2018)	44,236	1,277	34.6
23	Hakeem Olajuwon*	C	Houston Rockets (1984–2001); Toronto Raptors (2001–2002)	44,222	1,238	35.7
24	DeMar DeRozan^	SG/SF	Toronto Raptors (2009–2018); San Antonio Spurs (2018–2021); Chicago Bulls (2021–2024); Sacramento Kings (2024–2026); Denver Nuggets (2026–present)	43,910	1,276	34.4
25	Oscar Robertson*	PG	Cincinnati Royals (1960–1970); Milwaukee Bucks (1970–1974)	43,886	1,040	42.2
26	Carmelo Anthony*	SF	Denver Nuggets (2003–2011); New York Knicks (2011–2017); Oklahoma City Thunder (2017–2018); Houston Rockets (2018–2019); Portland Trail Blazers (2019–2021); Los Angeles Lakers (2021–2022)	43,514	1,260	34.5
27	Russell Westbrook^{†}	PG	Oklahoma City Thunder (2008–2019); Houston Rockets (2019–2020); Washington Wizards (2020–2021); Los Angeles Lakers (2021–2023); Los Angeles Clippers (2023–2024); Denver Nuggets (2024–2025); Sacramento Kings (2025–2026)	43,025	1,301	33.1
28	James Harden^	SG/PG	Oklahoma City Thunder (2009–2012); Houston Rockets (2012–2021); Brooklyn Nets (2021–2022); Philadelphia 76ers (2022–2023); Los Angeles Clippers (2023–2026); Cleveland Cavaliers (2026–present)	42,946	1,236	34.7
29	Clifford Robinson	PF/SF	Portland Trail Blazers (1989–1997); Phoenix Suns (1997–2001); Detroit Pistons (2001–2003); Golden State Warriors (2003–2005); New Jersey Nets (2005–2007)	42,561	1,380	30.8
30	Buck Williams	PF	New Jersey Nets (1981–1989); Portland Trail Blazers (1989–1996); New York Knicks (1996–1998)	42,464	1,307	32.5
31	Jason Terry	SG/PG	Atlanta Hawks (1999–2004); Dallas Mavericks (2004–2012); Boston Celtics (2012–2013); Brooklyn Nets (2013–2014); Houston Rockets (2014–2016); Milwaukee Bucks (2016–2018)	42,034	1,410	29.8
32	Shaquille O'Neal*	C	Orlando Magic (1992–1996); Los Angeles Lakers (1996–2004); Miami Heat (2004–2008); Phoenix Suns (2008–2009); Cleveland Cavaliers (2009–2010); Boston Celtics (2010–2011)	41,918	1,207	34.7
33	Scottie Pippen*	SF	Chicago Bulls (1987–1998, 2003–2004); Houston Rockets (1999); Portland Trail Blazers (1999–2003)	41,069	1,178	34.9
34	Michael Jordan*	SG	Chicago Bulls (1984–1993, 1995–1998); Washington Wizards (2001–2003)	41,011	1,072	38.3
35	Pau Gasol*	PF/C	Memphis Grizzlies (2001–2008); Los Angeles Lakers (2008–2014); Chicago Bulls (2014–2016); San Antonio Spurs (2016–2019); Milwaukee Bucks (2019)	41,001	1,226	33.4
36	Bill Russell*	C	Boston Celtics (1956–1969)	40,726	963	42.3
37	Patrick Ewing*	C	New York Knicks (1985–2000); Seattle SuperSonics (2000–2001); Orlando Magic (2001–2002)	40,594	1,183	34.3
38	Charles Oakley	PF	Chicago Bulls (1985–1988, 2001–2002); New York Knicks (1988–1999); Toronto Raptors (1998–2001); Washington Wizards (2002–2003); Houston Rockets (2004)	40,280	1,282	31.4
39	Andre Miller	PG	Cleveland Cavaliers (1999–2002); Los Angeles Clippers (2002–2003); Denver Nuggets (2003–2006, 2011–2014); Philadelphia 76ers (2006–2009); Portland Trail Blazers (2009–2011); Washington Wizards (2013–2015); Sacramento Kings (2015); Minnesota Timberwolves (2015–2016); San Antonio Spurs (2016)	40,268	1,304	30.9
40	Shawn Marion	SF/PF	Phoenix Suns (1999–2008); Miami Heat (2008–2009); Toronto Raptors (2009); Dallas Mavericks (2009–2014); Cleveland Cavaliers (2014–2015)	40,097	1,163	34.5
41	Otis Thorpe	PF	Kansas City/Sacramento Kings (1984–1988, 1998); Houston Rockets (1988–1995); Portland Trail Blazers (1995); Detroit Pistons (1995–1997); Vancouver Grizzlies (1997–1998); Washington Wizards (1998–1999); Miami Heat (1999–2000); Charlotte Hornets (2000–2001)	39,822	1,257	31.7
42	Hal Greer*	SG/PG	Syracuse Nationals/Philadelphia 76ers (1958–1973)	39,788	1,122	35.5
43	Andre Iguodala	SF/SG	Philadelphia 76ers (2004–2012); Denver Nuggets (2012–2013); Golden State Warriors (2013–2019, 2021–2023); Miami Heat (2020–2021)	39,507	1,231	32.1
44	Dwight Howard*	C	Orlando Magic (2004–2012); Los Angeles Lakers (2012–2013, 2019–2020, 2021–2022); Houston Rockets (2013–2016); Atlanta Hawks (2016–2017); Charlotte Hornets (2017–2018); Washington Wizards (2018–2019); Philadelphia 76ers (2020–2021)	39,457	1,242	31.8
45	Charles Barkley*	PF	Philadelphia 76ers (1984–1992); Phoenix Suns (1992–1996); Houston Rockets (1996–2000)	39,330	1,073	36.7
46	Mark Jackson	PG	New York Knicks (1987–1992, 2001–2002); Los Angeles Clippers (1992–1994); Indiana Pacers (1994–1996, 1997–2000); Denver Nuggets (1996–1997); Toronto Raptors (2000–2001); Utah Jazz (2002–2003); Houston Rockets (2003–2004)	39,121	1,296	30.2
47	Jamal Crawford	SG	Chicago Bulls (2000–2004); New York Knicks (2004–2008); Golden State Warriors (2008–2009); Atlanta Hawks (2009–2011); Portland Trail Blazers (2011–2012); Los Angeles Clippers (2012–2017); Minnesota Timberwolves (2017–2018); Phoenix Suns (2018–2019); Brooklyn Nets (2020)	38,994	1,327	29.4
48	Walt Bellamy*	C	Chicago Packers/Zephyrs/Baltimore Bullets (1961–1965); New York Knicks (1965–1968); Detroit Pistons (1968–1970); Atlanta Hawks (1970–1974); New Orleans Jazz (1974)	38,940	1,043	37.3
49	Horace Grant	PF	Chicago Bulls (1987–1994); Orlando Magic (1994–1999, 2001–2002); Seattle SuperSonics (1999–2000); Los Angeles Lakers (2000–2001, 2003–2004)	38,621	1,165	33.2
50	Kevin Willis	PF/C	Atlanta Hawks (1984–1994, 2004–2005); Miami Heat (1994–1996); Golden State Warriors (1996); Houston Rockets (1996–1998, 2001–2002); Toronto Raptors (1999–2001); Denver Nuggets (2001); San Antonio Spurs (2002–2004); Dallas Mavericks (2007)	38,362	1,424	26.9

== Progressive list of minutes played leaders ==
This is a progressive list of leaders and records for minutes played showing how the record has increased through the years.

^	Active NBA player
*	Inducted into the Naismith Memorial Basketball Hall of Fame

Statistics accurate as of November 18, 2026.

Team abbreviationsTeam(s) listed is the one player was on when he established the record.
ATL	Atlanta Hawks	DET	Detroit Pistons	NJN	New Jersey Nets	SAC	Sacramento Kings
BOS	Boston Celtics	FTW	Fort Wayne Pistons	NOJ	New Orleans Jazz	SAS	San Antonio Spurs
BKN	Brooklyn Nets	GSW	Golden State Warriors	NYK	New York Knicks	SFW	San Francisco Warriors
BUF	Buffalo Braves	HOU	Houston Rockets	OKC	Oklahoma City Thunder	STL	St. Louis Hawks
CAP	Capital Bullets	IND	Indiana Pacers	ORL	Orlando Magic	SYR	Syracuse Nationals
CHO	Charlotte Hornets	KCO	Kansas City-Omaha Kings	PHI	Philadelphia 76ers	UTA	Utah Jazz
CHI	Chicago Bulls	LAL	Los Angeles Lakers	PHW	Philadelphia Warriors	WAS	Washington Wizards
CLE	Cleveland Cavaliers	MIA	Miami Heat	PHX	Phoenix Suns	WSB	Washington Bullets
DAL	Dallas Mavericks	MIL	Milwaukee Bucks	POR	Portland Trail Blazers		
DEN	Denver Nuggets	MIN	Minnesota Timberwolves	SAC	Sacramento Kings		

Minutes played leader at the end of every season
Season	Year-by-year leader	MP	Active player leader	MP	Career record	MP	Single-season record	MP	Season
1951–52	Paul Arizin*PHW	2,939	Paul Arizin*PHW	2,939	Paul Arizin*PHW	2,939	Paul Arizin*PHW	2,939	1951–52
1952–53	Neil Johnston*PHW	3,166	Bob Cousy*BOS	5,626	Bob Cousy*BOS	5,626	Neil Johnston*PHW	3,166	1952–53
1953–54	Neil Johnston*PHW	3,296	Bob Cousy*BOS	8,483	Bob Cousy*BOS	8,483	Neil Johnston*PHW	3,296	1953–54
1954–55	Paul Arizin*PHW	2,953	Mel HutchinsFTW	11,303	Mel HutchinsFTW	11,303	Neil Johnston*PHW	3,296	1954–55
1955–56	Jack GeorgePHW	2,840	Bob Cousy*BOS	13,997	Bob Cousy*BOS	13,997	Neil Johnston*PHW	3,296	1955–56
1956–57	Dolph Schayes*SYR	2,851	Bob Cousy*BOS	16,361	Bob Cousy*BOS	16,361	Neil Johnston*PHW	3,296	1956–57
1957–58	Dolph Schayes*SYR	2,918	Bob Cousy*BOS	18,583	Bob Cousy*BOS	18,583	Neil Johnston*PHW	3,296	1957–58
1958–59	Bill Russell*BOS	2,979	Bob Cousy*BOS	20,986	Bob Cousy*BOS	20,986	Neil Johnston*PHW	3,296	1958–59
1959–60	Wilt Chamberlain*PHW Gene ShueDET	3,338	Bob Cousy*BOS	23,574	Bob Cousy*BOS	23,574	Wilt Chamberlain*PHW Gene ShueDET	3,338	1959–60
1960–61	Wilt Chamberlain*; PHW 1959-62; SFW 1962-64	3,773	Dolph Schayes*SYR	26,532	Dolph Schayes*SYR	26,532	Wilt Chamberlain*PHW	3,773	1960–61
1961–62	Wilt Chamberlain*; PHW 1959-62; SFW 1962-64	3,882	Bob Cousy*BOS	28,156	Bob Cousy*BOS	28,156	Wilt Chamberlain*PHW	3,882	1961–62
1962–63	Wilt Chamberlain*; PHW 1959-62; SFW 1962-64	3,806	Bob Cousy*BOS	30,131	Bob Cousy*BOS	30,131	Wilt Chamberlain*PHW	3,882	1962–63
1963–64	Wilt Chamberlain*; PHW 1959-62; SFW 1962-64	3,689	Dolph Schayes*PHI	29,800	Bob Cousy*BOS	30,131	Wilt Chamberlain*PHW	3,882	1963–64
1964–65	Bill Russell*BOS	3,466	Bob Pettit*STL	30,690	Bob Pettit*STL	30,690	Wilt Chamberlain*PHW	3,882	1964–65
1965–66	Wilt Chamberlain*PHI	3,737	Bill Russell*BOS	31,185	Bill Russell*BOS	31,185	Wilt Chamberlain*PHW	3,882	1965–66
1966–67	Wilt Chamberlain*PHI	3,682	Bill Russell*BOS	34,482	Bill Russell*BOS	34,482	Wilt Chamberlain*PHW	3,882	1966–67
1967–68	Wilt Chamberlain*PHI	3,836	Bill Russell*BOS	37,435	Bill Russell*BOS	37,435	Wilt Chamberlain*PHW	3,882	1967–68
1968–69	Elvin Hayes*SDR	3,695	Bill Russell*BOS	40,726	Bill Russell*BOS	40,726	Wilt Chamberlain*PHW	3,882	1968–69
1969–70	Elvin Hayes*SDR	3,665	Wilt Chamberlain*LAL	37,218	Bill Russell*BOS	40,726	Wilt Chamberlain*PHW	3,882	1969–70
1970–71	John Havlicek*BOS	3,678	Wilt Chamberlain*LAL	40,848	Wilt Chamberlain*LAL	40,848	Wilt Chamberlain*PHW	3,882	1970–71
1971–72	John Havlicek*BOS	3,698	Wilt Chamberlain*LAL	44,317	Wilt Chamberlain*LAL	44,317	Wilt Chamberlain*PHW	3,882	1971–72
1972–73	Nate Archibald*KCO	3,681	Wilt Chamberlain*LAL	47,859	Wilt Chamberlain*LAL	47,859	Wilt Chamberlain*PHW	3,882	1972–73
1973–74	Elvin Hayes*CAP	3,602	Oscar Robertson*MIL	43,886	Wilt Chamberlain*LAL	47,859	Wilt Chamberlain*PHW	3,882	1973–74
1974–75	Bob McAdoo*BUF	3,539	Walt Bellamy*NOJ	38,940	Wilt Chamberlain*LAL	47,859	Wilt Chamberlain*PHW	3,882	1974–75
1975–76	Kareem Abdul-Jabbar*LAL	3,379	John Havlicek*BOS	40,761	Wilt Chamberlain*LAL	47,859	Wilt Chamberlain*PHW	3,882	1975–76
1976–77	Elvin Hayes*WSB	3,364	John Havlicek*BOS	43,674	Wilt Chamberlain*LAL	47,859	Wilt Chamberlain*PHW	3,882	1976–77
1977–78	Truck RobinsonNOJ	3,638	John Havlicek*BOS	46,471	Wilt Chamberlain*LAL	47,859	Wilt Chamberlain*PHW	3,882	1977–78
1978–79	Moses Malone*HOU	3,390	Elvin Hayes*; WSB 1978-81; HOU 1981-84	37,558	Wilt Chamberlain*LAL	47,859	Wilt Chamberlain*PHW	3,882	1978–79
1979–80	Norm NixonLAL	3,226	Elvin Hayes*; WSB 1978-81; HOU 1981-84	40,741	Wilt Chamberlain*LAL	47,859	Wilt Chamberlain*PHW	3,882	1979–80
1980–81	Adrian Dantley*UTA	3,417	Elvin Hayes*; WSB 1978-81; HOU 1981-84	43,672	Wilt Chamberlain*LAL	47,859	Wilt Chamberlain*PHW	3,882	1980–81
1981–82	Moses Malone*HOU	3,398	Elvin Hayes*; WSB 1978-81; HOU 1981-84	46,704	Wilt Chamberlain*LAL	47,859	Wilt Chamberlain*PHW	3,882	1981–82
1982–83	Isiah Thomas*DET	3,093	Elvin Hayes*; WSB 1978-81; HOU 1981-84	49,006	Elvin Hayes*HOU	49,006	Wilt Chamberlain*PHW	3,882	1982–83
1983–84	Jeff RulandWSB	3,082	Elvin Hayes*; WSB 1978-81; HOU 1981-84	50,000	Elvin Hayes*HOU	50,000	Wilt Chamberlain*PHW	3,882	1983–84
1984–85	Buck WilliamsNJN	3,182	Kareem Abdul-Jabbar*; LAL	48,373	Elvin Hayes*HOU	50,000	Wilt Chamberlain*PHW	3,882	1984–85
1985–86	Maurice Cheeks*PHI	3,270	Kareem Abdul-Jabbar*; LAL	51,002	Kareem Abdul-Jabbar*LAL	51,002	Wilt Chamberlain*PHW	3,882	1985–86
1986–87	Michael Jordan*CHI	3,281	Kareem Abdul-Jabbar*; LAL	53,443	Kareem Abdul-Jabbar*LAL	53,443	Wilt Chamberlain*PHW	3,882	1986–87
1987–88	Michael Jordan*CHI	3,311	Kareem Abdul-Jabbar*; LAL	55,751	Kareem Abdul-Jabbar*LAL	55,751	Wilt Chamberlain*PHW	3,882	1987–88
1988–89	Michael Jordan*CHI	3,255	Kareem Abdul-Jabbar*; LAL	57,446	Kareem Abdul-Jabbar*LAL	57,446	Wilt Chamberlain*PHW	3,882	1988–89
1989–90	Rodney McCraySAC	3,238	Moses Malone*; ATL 1989-91; MIL 1991-93; PHI 1993–94; SAS 1994–95	39,777	Kareem Abdul-Jabbar*LAL	57,446	Wilt Chamberlain*PHW	3,882	1989–90
1990–91	Chris Mullin*GSW	3,315	Moses Malone*; ATL 1989-91; MIL 1991-93; PHI 1993–94; SAS 1994–95	41,689	Kareem Abdul-Jabbar*LAL	57,446	Wilt Chamberlain*PHW	3,882	1990–91
1991–92	Chris Mullin*GSW	3,346	Moses Malone*; ATL 1989-91; MIL 1991-93; PHI 1993–94; SAS 1994–95	44,200	Kareem Abdul-Jabbar*LAL	57,446	Wilt Chamberlain*PHW	3,882	1991–92
1992–93	Larry JohnsonCHO	3,323	Moses Malone*; ATL 1989-91; MIL 1991-93; PHI 1993–94; SAS 1994–95	44,304	Kareem Abdul-Jabbar*LAL	57,446	Wilt Chamberlain*PHW	3,882	1992–93
1993–94	Latrell SprewellGSW	3,533	Moses Malone*; ATL 1989-91; MIL 1991-93; PHI 1993–94; SAS 1994–95	44,922	Kareem Abdul-Jabbar*LAL	57,446	Wilt Chamberlain*PHW	3,882	1993–94
1994–95	Vin BakerMIL	3,361	Moses Malone*; ATL 1989-91; MIL 1991-93; PHI 1993–94; SAS 1994–95	45,071	Kareem Abdul-Jabbar*LAL	57,446	Wilt Chamberlain*PHW	3,882	1994–95
1995–96	Anthony MasonNYK	3,457	Robert Parish*; CHO 1995–96; CHI 1996-97	45,298	Kareem Abdul-Jabbar*LAL	57,446	Wilt Chamberlain*PHW	3,882	1995–96
1996–97	Glen RiceCHO	3,362	Robert Parish*; CHO 1995–96; CHI 1996-97	45,704	Kareem Abdul-Jabbar*LAL	57,446	Wilt Chamberlain*PHW	3,882	1996–97
1997–98	Michael FinleyDAL	3,394	Buck WilliamsNYK	42,464	Kareem Abdul-Jabbar*LAL	57,446	Wilt Chamberlain*PHW	3,882	1997–98
1998–99	Jason Kidd*PHX	2,060	Karl Malone*; UTA 1998-2003; LAL 2003–04	41,661	Kareem Abdul-Jabbar*LAL	57,446	Wilt Chamberlain*PHW	3,882	1998–99
1999–00	Michael FinleyDAL	3,464	Karl Malone*; UTA 1998-2003; LAL 2003–04	44,608	Kareem Abdul-Jabbar*LAL	57,446	Wilt Chamberlain*PHW	3,882	1999–00
2000–01	Michael FinleyDAL	3,443	Karl Malone*; UTA 1998-2003; LAL 2003–04	47,503	Kareem Abdul-Jabbar*LAL	57,446	Wilt Chamberlain*PHW	3,882	2000–01
2001–02	Antoine WalkerBOS	3,406	Karl Malone*; UTA 1998-2003; LAL 2003–04	50,543	Kareem Abdul-Jabbar*LAL	57,446	Wilt Chamberlain*PHW	3,882	2001–02
2002–03	Allen Iverson*PHI	3,485	Karl Malone*; UTA 1998-2003; LAL 2003–04	53,479	Kareem Abdul-Jabbar*LAL	57,446	Wilt Chamberlain*PHW	3,882	2002–03
2003–04	Joe JohnsonPHX	3,331	Karl Malone*; UTA 1998-2003; LAL 2003–04	54,852	Kareem Abdul-Jabbar*LAL	57,446	Wilt Chamberlain*PHW	3,882	2003–04
2004–05	LeBron James^CLE	3,388	Reggie Miller*IND	47,619	Kareem Abdul-Jabbar*LAL	57,446	Wilt Chamberlain*PHW	3,882	2004–05
2005–06	Gilbert ArenasWAS	3,384	Gary Payton*MIA	45,614	Kareem Abdul-Jabbar*LAL	57,446	Wilt Chamberlain*PHW	3,882	2005–06
2006–07	LeBron James^CLE	3,190	Gary Payton*MIA	47,117	Kareem Abdul-Jabbar*LAL	57,446	Wilt Chamberlain*PHW	3,882	2006–07
2007–08	Allen Iverson*DEN	3,424	Jason Kidd*; NJN 2007–08; DAL 2008–12; NYK 2012–13	38,269	Kareem Abdul-Jabbar*LAL	57,446	Wilt Chamberlain*PHW	3,882	2007–08
2008–09	Andre IguodalaPHI	3,269	Jason Kidd*; NJN 2007–08; DAL 2008–12; NYK 2012–13	41,155	Kareem Abdul-Jabbar*LAL	57,446	Wilt Chamberlain*PHW	3,882	2008–09
2009–10	Kevin Durant^OKC	3,239	Jason Kidd*; NJN 2007–08; DAL 2008–12; NYK 2012–13	44,036	Kareem Abdul-Jabbar*LAL	57,446	Wilt Chamberlain*PHW	3,882	2009–10
2010–11	Monta EllisGSW	3,227	Jason Kidd*; NJN 2007–08; DAL 2008–12; NYK 2012–13	46,689	Kareem Abdul-Jabbar*LAL	57,446	Wilt Chamberlain*PHW	3,882	2010–11
2011–12	Kevin Durant^OKC	2,546	Jason Kidd*; NJN 2007–08; DAL 2008–12; NYK 2012–13	48,068	Kareem Abdul-Jabbar*LAL	57,446	Wilt Chamberlain*PHW	3,882	2011–12
2012–13	Damian Lillard^POR	3,167	Jason Kidd*; NJN 2007–08; DAL 2008–12; NYK 2012–13	50,111	Kareem Abdul-Jabbar*LAL	57,446	Wilt Chamberlain*PHW	3,882	2012–13
2013–14	Kevin Durant^OKC	3,122	Kevin Garnett*; BKN 2013–15; MIN 2015–16	48,910	Kareem Abdul-Jabbar*LAL	57,446	Wilt Chamberlain*PHW	3,882	2013–14
2014–15	James Harden^HOU	2,981	Kevin Garnett*; BKN 2013–15; MIN 2015–16	49,862	Kareem Abdul-Jabbar*LAL	57,446	Wilt Chamberlain*PHW	3,882	2014–15
2015–16	James Harden^HOU	3,125	Kevin Garnett*; BKN 2013–15; MIN 2015–16	50,418	Kareem Abdul-Jabbar*LAL	57,446	Wilt Chamberlain*PHW	3,882	2015–16
2016–17	Andrew Wiggins^MIN	3,048	Dirk Nowitzki*DAL	48,673	Kareem Abdul-Jabbar*LAL	57,446	Wilt Chamberlain*PHW	3,882	2016–17
2017–18	LeBron James^CLE	3,026	Dirk Nowitzki*DAL	50,573	Kareem Abdul-Jabbar*LAL	57,446	Wilt Chamberlain*PHW	3,882	2017–18
2018–19	Bradley Beal^WAS	3,028	Dirk Nowitzki*DAL	51,368	Kareem Abdul-Jabbar*LAL	57,446	Wilt Chamberlain*PHW	3,882	2018–19
2019–20	CJ McCollum^POR	2,556	LeBron James^ LAL 2019–26; PHI 2026–	48,551	Kareem Abdul-Jabbar*LAL	57,446	Wilt Chamberlain*PHW	3,882	2019–20
2020–21	Julius Randle^NYK	2,667	LeBron James^ LAL 2019–26; PHI 2026–	50,055	Kareem Abdul-Jabbar*LAL	57,446	Wilt Chamberlain*PHW	3,882	2020–21
2021–22	Mikal Bridges^ PHX 2021–23; BKN 2023	2,854	LeBron James^ LAL 2019–26; PHI 2026–	52,139	Kareem Abdul-Jabbar*LAL	57,446	Wilt Chamberlain*PHW	3,882	2021–22
2022–23	Mikal Bridges^ PHX 2021–23; BKN 2023	2,963	LeBron James^ LAL 2019–26; PHI 2026–	54,092	Kareem Abdul-Jabbar*LAL	57,446	Wilt Chamberlain*PHW	3,882	2022–23
2023–24	DeMar DeRozan^CHI	2,989	LeBron James^ LAL 2019–26; PHI 2026–	56,596	Kareem Abdul-Jabbar*LAL	57,446	Wilt Chamberlain*PHW	3,882	2023–24
2024–25	Mikal Bridges^NYK	3,036	LeBron James^ LAL 2019–26; PHI 2026–	59,041	LeBron James^ LAL 2024–26; PHI 2026–	59,041	Wilt Chamberlain*PHW	3,882	2024–25
2025–26	Amen Thompson^HOU	2,953	LeBron James^ LAL 2019–26; PHI 2026–	61,030	LeBron James^ LAL 2024–26; PHI 2026–	61,030	Wilt Chamberlain*PHW	3,882	2025–26
2026–27	Tyrese Maxey^PHI	560	LeBron James^ LAL 2019–26; PHI 2026–	61,419	LeBron James^ LAL 2024–26; PHI 2026–	61,419	Wilt Chamberlain*PHW	3,882	2026–27
Season	Year-by-year leader	MP	Active player leader	MP	Career record	MP	Single-season record	MP	Season

== See also ==
- NBA records
- List of NBA annual minutes played leaders
