= Sherwin Raiken =

American basketball player (1928–2009)

Personal information
- Born: October 29, 1928 Philadelphia, Pennsylvania, U.S.
- Died: January 16, 2009 (aged 80) Philadelphia, Pennsylvania, U.S.
- Listed height: 6 ft 2 in (1.88 m)
- Listed weight: 185 lb (84 kg)

Career information
- High school: Dobbins Tech (Philadelphia, Pennsylvania)
- College: Villanova (1946–1950)
- NBA draft: 1950: undrafted
- Position: Guard
- Number: 5

Career history
- 1950–1951: Berwick Carbuilders
- 1953: New York Knicks
- Stats at NBA.com
- Stats at Basketball Reference

Sherwin Herman Raiken (October 29, 1928 – January 16, 2009) was an American professional basketball player who spent one season in the National Basketball Association (NBA) as a member of the New York Knicks during the 1952–53 season. He played college basketball for the Villanova Wildcats.

== Career statistics ==
Legend
GP	Games played	GS	Games started	MPG	Minutes per game
FG%	Field goal percentage	3P%	3-point field goal percentage	FT%	Free throw percentage
RPG	Rebounds per game	APG	Assists per game	SPG	Steals per game
BPG	Blocks per game	PPG	Points per game	**Bold**	Career high

=== NBA ===
==== Regular season ====
Year	Team	GP	MPG	FG%	FT%	RPG	APG	PPG
1952–53	New York	6	10.5	.143	.375	1.3	1.0	1.5

==== Playoffs ====
Year	Team	GP	MPG	FG%	FT%	RPG	APG	PPG
1953	New York	4	4.8	.800	.000	.3	.5	2.0
