= Claude Overton =

American basketball player

Personal information
- Born: December 16, 1927 Temple, Oklahoma, U.S.
- Died: April 29, 1996 (aged 68) Norman, Oklahoma, U.S.
- Listed height: 6 ft 2 in (1.88 m)
- Listed weight: 195 lb (88 kg)

Career information
- High school: McAlester (McAlester, Oklahoma)
- College: East Central (1946–1950)
- NBA draft: 1950: 5th round, 52nd overall pick
- Drafted by: Washington Capitols
- Position: Shooting guard
- Number: 14

Career history
- 1950: Wilkes-Barre Barons
- 1950–1951: Waterloo Hawks
- 1952–1953: Philadelphia Warriors
- Stats at NBA.com
- Stats at Basketball Reference

Claudell Overton (December 16, 1927 – April 29, 1996) was an American professional basketball player. Overton was selected in the fifth round (52nd overall) of the 1950 NBA draft by the Washington Capitols after a collegiate career at East Central. He played for the Philadelphia Warriors in 15 total games in 1952–53.

== Career statistics ==
Legend
GP	Games played	GS	Games started	MPG	Minutes per game
FG%	Field goal percentage	3P%	3-point field goal percentage	FT%	Free throw percentage
RPG	Rebounds per game	APG	Assists per game	SPG	Steals per game
BPG	Blocks per game	PPG	Points per game	**Bold**	Career high

=== NBA ===
==== Regular season ====
Year	Team	GP	MPG	FG%	FT%	RPG	APG	PPG
1952–53	Philadelphia	15	12.1	.253	.667	1.7	1.0	3.9
