= 1952–53 New York Knicks season =

Season of National Basketball Association team the New York Knicks

- Division champions
- Head coach: Joe Lapchick
- General manager: Ned Irish
- Arena: Madison Square Garden

Results
- Record: 47–23 (.671)
- Place: Division: 1st (Eastern)
- Playoff finish: NBA Finals (lost to Lakers 1–4)
- Stats at Basketball Reference

Local media
- Television: WPIX
- Radio: WMGM

The 1952–53 New York Knickerbockers season was the seventh season for the team in the National Basketball Association (NBA). With a 47–23 record, the Knickerbockers won the regular season Eastern Division title by a half-game over the Syracuse Nationals and made the NBA Playoffs for the seventh consecutive year.

In the first round of the 1953 NBA Playoffs, the Knickerbockers swept the Baltimore Bullets 2–0 in a best-of-three series to advance to the Eastern Division finals. There, New York defeated the Boston Celtics 3–1 to make the NBA Finals for the third straight year. In the Finals, the Knickerbockers lost to the Minneapolis Lakers, four games to one. The club would wait another 17 years to make an NBA championship final, winning it in 1970.

== NBA draft ==
Note: This is not an extensive list; it only covers the first and second rounds, and any other players picked by the franchise that played at least one game in the league.

Round	Pick	Player	Position	Nationality	School/Club team
1	5	Ralph Polson	F/C	United States	Whitworth
–	–	Dick Bunt	G	United States	NYU
–	–	Bert Cook	G/F	United States	Utah State
–	–	Dick Surhoff	F	United States	Long Island

== Roster ==
1952–53 New York Knicks roster
Players

Pos.	No.	Player	Height	Weight	DOB	From
SF	12	Vince Boryla	6 ft 5 in (1.96 m)	210 lb (95 kg)	1927-03-11	Denver
SG	4	Carl Braun	6 ft 5 in (1.96 m)	180 lb (82 kg)	1927-09-25	Colgate
PG	3	Dick Bunt	6 ft 0 in (1.83 m)	170 lb (77 kg)	1930-07-13	NYU
PF	8	Nat Clifton	6 ft 6 in (1.98 m)	220 lb (100 kg)	1922-10-13	Xavier (LA)
G/F		Jerry Fleishman	6 ft 2 in (1.88 m)	190 lb (86 kg)	1922-02-14	NYU
PF	11	Harry Gallatin	6 ft 6 in (1.98 m)	210 lb (95 kg)	1927-04-26	Truman State
SG	7	Ray Lumpp	6 ft 1 in (1.85 m)	178 lb (81 kg)	1923-07-11	NYU
PG	3, 16	Al McGuire	6 ft 2 in (1.88 m)	180 lb (82 kg)	1928-09-07	St. John's
PG	15	Dick McGuire	6 ft 0 in (1.83 m)	180 lb (82 kg)	1926-01-25	St. John's
PF	6	Ralph Polson	6 ft 7 in (2.01 m)	200 lb (91 kg)	1929-10-26	Whitworth
G	5	Sherwin Raiken	6 ft 2 in (1.88 m)	185 lb (84 kg)	1928-10-29	Villanova
C	18	Connie Simmons	6 ft 8 in (2.03 m)	222 lb (101 kg)	1925-03-15	Flushing High School
SF	14, 17	Dick Surhoff	6 ft 4 in (1.93 m)	210 lb (95 kg)	1929-11-16	Long Island
SF	9	Ernie Vandeweghe	6 ft 3 in (1.91 m)	195 lb (88 kg)	1928-09-12	Colgate
SG	10	Max Zaslofsky	6 ft 2 in (1.88 m)	170 lb (77 kg)	1925-12-07	St. John's

Coaches
Head coach
- Joe Lapchick

Legend
- (DP) Unsigned draft pick
- (FA) Free agent
- (S) Suspended
- Injured

Roster

== Regular season ==
=== Season standings ===
Eastern Division	W	L	PCT	GB	Home	Road	Neutral	Div
x-New York Knicks	47	23	.671	-	22-4	15-14	10-5	30-10
x-Syracuse Nationals	47	24	.662	0.5	32-2	10-20	5-2	26-15
x-Boston Celtics	46	25	.648	1.5	21-3	11-18	14-4	28-13
x-Baltimore Bullets	16	54	.229	31	11-20	1–19	4-15	10-30
Philadelphia Warriors	12	57	.174	34.5	5-12	1–28	6-17	7-33

x – clinched playoff spot

=== Game log ===
1952–53 game log
#	Date	Opponent	Score	High points	Record
1	November 1	Baltimore	53–69	Nathaniel Clifton (20)	1–0
2	November 8	@ Baltimore	92–62	Nathaniel Clifton (22)	2–0
3	November 11	@ Rochester	94–104	Carl Braun (19)	2–1
4	November 13	Minneapolis	91–100	Ernie Vandeweghe (21)	3–1
5	November 15	Boston	68–79	Carl Braun (17)	4–1
6	November 16	@ Fort Wayne	83–112	Connie Simmons (17)	4–2
7	November 18	Indianapolis	90–100	Vince Boryla (22)	4–3
8	November 20	N Indianapolis	72–67	Harry Gallatin (16)	5–3
9	November 22	Syracuse	68–98	Max Zaslofsky (22)	6–3
10	November 23	@ Syracuse	73–76	Harry Gallatin (13)	6–4
11	November 26	@ Baltimore	94–92	Connie Simmons (20)	7–4
12	November 27	N Baltimore	104–92	Nathaniel Clifton (19)	8–4
13	November 29	Indianapolis	72–94	Ernie Vandeweghe (16)	9–4
14	December 2	@ Philadelphia	89–82 (OT)	Carl Braun (24)	10–4
15	December 3	N Philadelphia	75–100	Vince Boryla (21)	11–4
16	December 4	Minneapolis	81–71	Connie Simmons (20)	11–5
17	December 6	@ Minneapolis	78–85 (OT)	Carl Braun (25)	11–6
18	December 7	@ Fort Wayne	91–102	Carl Braun (16)	11–7
19	December 9	Rochester	77–75	Max Zaslofsky (21)	11–8
20	December 13	@ Rochester	99–97 (OT)	Carl Braun (25)	12–8
21	December 14	@ Milwaukee	74–69	Gallatin, Simmons (14)	13–8
22	December 16	Syracuse	93–98 (OT)	Max Zaslofsky (22)	14–8
23	December 20	@ Baltimore	102–99 (OT)	Carl Braun (28)	15–8
24	December 21	Baltimore	77–102	Connie Simmons (17)	16–8
25	December 22	N Milwaukee	80–75	Nathaniel Clifton (18)	17–8
26	December 25	Boston	84–97	Ernie Vandeweghe (21)	18–8
27	December 27	N Fort Wayne	91–92	Connie Simmons (20)	18–9
28	December 28	Philadelphia	54–72	Ernie Vandeweghe (15)	19–9
29	January 1	@ Philadelphia	108–82	Ernie Vandeweghe (26)	20–9
30	January 3	Syracuse	77–85 (OT)	Connie Simmons (22)	21–9
31	January 4	@ Boston	100–103	Carl Braun (22)	21–10
32	January 7	N Syracuse	114–93	Carl Braun (25)	21–11
33	January 8	Milwaukee	68–81	Carl Braun (22)	22–11
34	January 9	@ Indianapolis	58–54	Carl Braun (16)	23–11
35	January 11	@ Minneapolis	79–85	Ernie Vandeweghe (21)	23–12
36	January 17	Philadelphia	76–84	Ernie Vandeweghe (20)	24–12
37	January 18	@ Boston	83–99	Harry Gallatin (20)	24–13
38	January 21	N Milwaukee	70–72	Nathaniel Clifton (14)	24–14
39	January 22	N Boston	112–89	Max Zaslofsky (26)	25–14
40	January 24	Fort Wayne	76–82	Carl Braun (20)	26–14
41	January 25	@ Syracuse	97–62	Harry Gallatin (22)	27–14
42	January 27	@ Rochester	74–72	Harry Gallatin (15)	28–14
43	January 29	@ Philadelphia	72–61	Clifton, Gallatin (18)	29–14
44	January 31	Boston	69–76	Braun, Clifton (21)	30–14
45	February 1	N Philadelphia	85–90	Harry Gallatin (21)	31–14
46	February 3	N Milwaukee	76–69	Nathaniel Clifton (18)	32–14
47	February 5	@ Minneapolis	73–81	Connie Simmons (17)	32–15
48	February 6	@ Indianapolis	84–73	Nathaniel Clifton (21)	33–15
49	February 7	Philadelphia	63–86	Harry Gallatin (23)	34–15
50	February 8	@ Boston	79–87	Nathaniel Clifton (15)	34–16
51	February 11	@ Baltimore	86–80	Carl Braun (18)	35–16
52	February 13	N Baltimore	106–96	Vince Boryla (23)	36–16
53	February 14	Indianapolis	79–91	Vince Boryla (22)	37–16
54	February 15	@ Syracuse	85–81	Carl Braun (21)	38–16
55	February 17	Milwaukee	67–86	Harry Gallatin (21)	39–16
56	February 18	N Boston	66–69	Ernie Vandeweghe (18)	39–17
57	February 21	Philadelphia	69–85	Carl Braun (18)	40–17
58	February 22	@ Boston	83–87 (OT)	Connie Simmons (20)	40–18
59	February 24	Minneapolis	63–79	Carl Braun (15)	41–18
60	February 25	N Rochester	79–71 (OT)	Carl Braun (25)	41–19
61	February 28	Fort Wayne	74–85	Ernie Vandeweghe (29)	42–19
62	March 1	@ Syracuse	64–79	Connie Simmons (19)	42–20
63	March 3	Rochester	88–109	Harry Gallatin (25)	43–20
64	March 5	N Baltimore	80–69	Nathaniel Clifton (17)	44–20
65	March 6	Syracuse	66–75	Vince Boryla (22)	45–20
66	March 8	Boston	89–78	Harry Gallatin (17)	45–21
67	March 11	N Baltimore	113–107 (3OT)	Carl Braun (24)	46–21
68	March 12	@ Philadelphia	90–85	Connie Simmons (29)	47–21
69	March 14	Syracuse	95–81	Nathaniel Clifton (18)	47–22
70	March 15	@ Fort Wayne	69–81	Harry Gallatin (30)	47–23

== Playoffs ==
1953 playoff game log
Division semifinals: 2–0 (home: 1–0; road: 1–0)

Game	Date	Team	Score	High points	Location	Series
1	March 17	Baltimore	W 80–62	Connie Simmons (25)	Madison Square Garden III	1–0
2	March 20	@ Baltimore	W 90–81	Vince Boryla (20)	Baltimore Coliseum	2–0

Division finals: 3–1 (home: 2–0; road: 1–1)

Game	Date	Team	Score	High points	High assists	Location	Series
1	March 25	Boston	W 95–91	Connie Simmons (18)	Dick McGuire (8)	Madison Square Garden III	1–0
2	March 26	@ Boston	L 70–86	Harry Gallatin (17)	Carl Braun (7)	Boston Garden	1–1
3	March 28	Boston	W 101–82	Harry Gallatin (23)	Dick McGuire (11)	Madison Square Garden III	2–1
4	March 29	@ Boston	W 82–75	Carl Braun (18)	Nat Clifton (9)	Boston Garden	3–1

NBA Finals: 1–4 (home: 0–3; road: 1–1)

Game	Date	Team	Score	High points	High assists	Location Attendance	Series
1	April 4	@ Minneapolis	W 96–88	Carl Braun (21)	—	Minneapolis Auditorium; 5,000	1–0
2	April 5	@ Minneapolis	L 71–73	Connie Simmons (17)	—	Minneapolis Auditorium; 4,848	1–1
3	April 7	Minneapolis	L 75–90	Connie Simmons (18)	—	69th Regiment Armory; 5,100	1–2
4	April 8	Minneapolis	L 69–71	Connie Simmons (17)	—	69th Regiment Armory; 5,200	1–3
5	April 10	Minneapolis	L 84–91	Carl Braun (19)	Ernie Vandeweghe (4)	69th Regiment Armory; 5,200	1–4

1953 schedule

== See also ==
- 1952–53 NBA season
