= Minute (basketball) =

Unit of time in a basketball game

A minute is a unit of time in a basketball game. Technically, just a minimum of one second in silo (1-59) would count as one minute of playing time. For example, there are forty-eight minutes in each NBA basketball game, excluding overtime. As five people from one team will be on the court at any given time, a total of 240 minutes can be distributed in regulation among a team in an NBA basketball game.

For players, the total number of minutes played in a season—and the average number of minutes played per game—are both tracked as statistics.

== Leaders ==
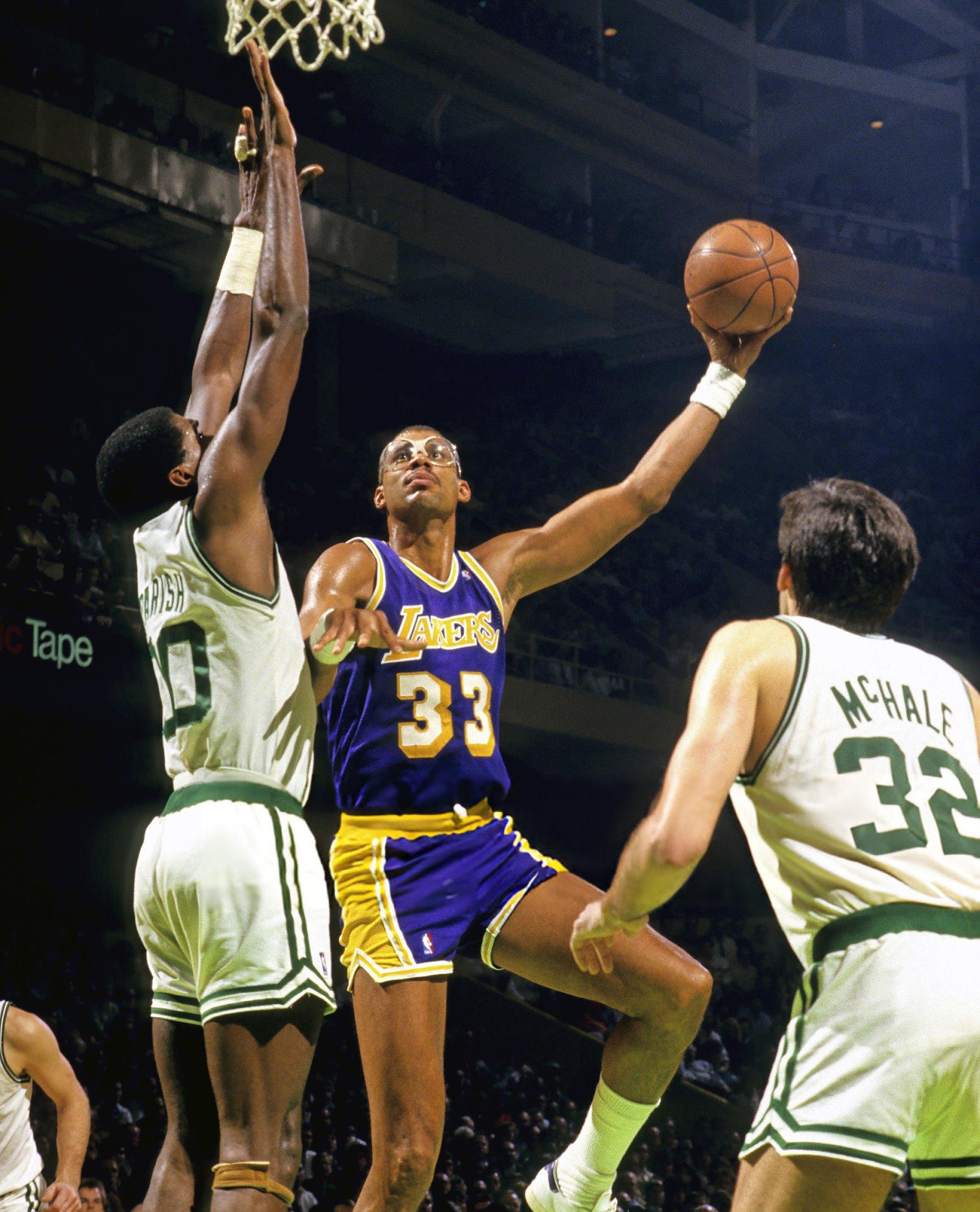
Abdul-Jabbar played a total of 57,446 minutes, more than any other player in the NBA until Lebron James passed him on December 19, 2024.

LeBron James is the all-time leader in minutes played with 60,711 as of March 23, 2026. Kareem Abdul-Jabbar (57,446), Karl Malone (54,852), Dirk Nowitzki (51,368), Kevin Garnett (50,418), Jason Kidd (50,111), and Elvin Hayes (50,000) are the only other players with 50,000 or more minutes played in a career. Most of Abdul-Jabbar and Hayes's minutes can largely be attributed to the amount of playing time that star players had in the late 1960s and early-to-mid 1970s. Abdul-Jabbar played 40 or more minutes per game from the 1969–70 season to the 1975–76 season, while Hayes played 40 or more minutes per game from the 1968–69 season to the 1974–75 season and from the 1976–77 season to the 1977–78 season.

Wilt Chamberlain holds the record for most minutes played in the NBA in one season with 3,882, set in the 1961–62 season.

== See also ==
- NBA records
