= Carl Braun (basketball) =

American basketball player and coach (1927–2010)

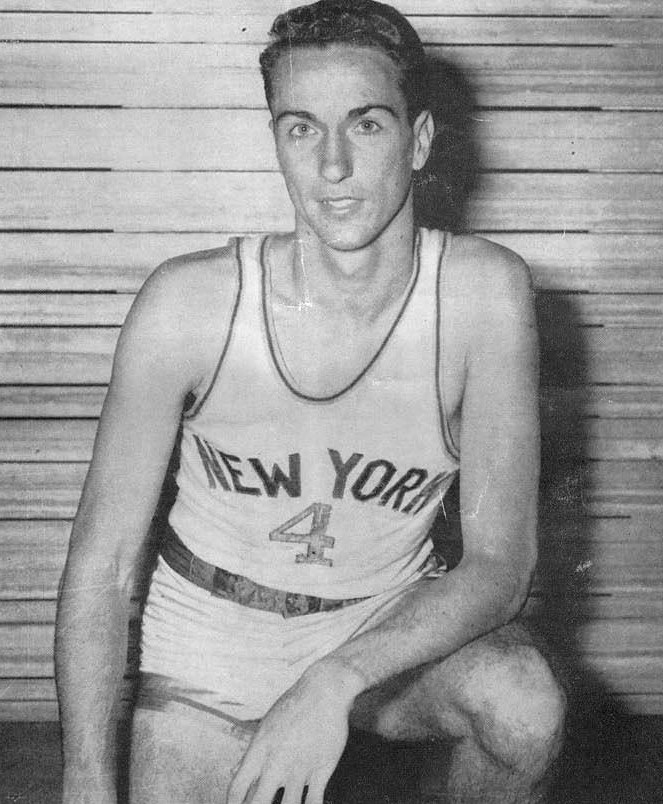
- Braun, c. 1959

Personal information
- Born: September 25, 1927 Brooklyn, New York, U.S.
- Died: February 10, 2010 (aged 82) Stuart, Florida, U.S.
- Listed height: 6 ft 5 in (1.96 m)
- Listed weight: 180 lb (82 kg)

Career information
- High school: Garden City (Garden City, New York)
- College: Colgate (1945–1947)
- BAA draft: 1947: undrafted
- Playing career: 1947–1962
- Position: Shooting guard / point guard
- Number: 4

Career history

Playing
- 1947–1950: New York Knicks
- 1951–1952: Washington Capitols
- 1952–1961: New York Knicks
- 1961–1962: Boston Celtics

Career highlights
- NBA champion (1962); 5× NBA All-Star (1953–1957); All-BAA Second Team (1948); All-NBA Second Team (1954)

Career statistics
- Points: 10,625
- Rebounds: 2,122
- Assists: 2,892
- Stats at NBA.com
- Stats at Basketball Reference
- Basketball Hall of Fame

Carl August Braun Jr. (September 25, 1927 – February 10, 2010) was an American professional basketball and baseball player and professional basketball coach.

== Sports career ==
Born on September 25, 1927, in Brooklyn, New York, Braun's German American family moved to Garden City for his senior year of high school. At 6'4" and 185 pounds he had talent as both a right-handed pitcher and as a basketball player. His high school nickname was "bean pole". As a senior at Garden City High School, he helped lead his team to their first-ever Nassau County baseball championship in 1945, and was a star basketball player; he was subsequently one of the inaugural inductees into the Nassau County High School Sports Hall of Fame. He enrolled in Colgate College and played collegiately for the Colgate University Raiders in 1945–1946. In the summer of 1947 was signed by the New York Yankees while still only 19 years old. He played two seasons for Yankee farm teams in Sunbury, Pennsylvania, and then Amsterdam, New York, appearing in 35 games compiling a 2–3 won-lost record.

In between those minor league baseball seasons, he also joined the New York Knicks for their 1947–1948 season, effectively playing in two professional sports simultaneously. On December 6, 1947, he set a then NBA single-game scoring record, recording 47 points. Incredibly he pitched one more season in the Yankees organization that following summer, until deciding that basketball was his future. Braun was one of the premier guards of the 1950s and spent 13 seasons in the NBA, all but the last with the Knicks. Braun led the Knicks in scoring during his first seven seasons. He was named to the All-NBA Second Team in 1948 and 1954. He ended his career in 1962, after one season with the Boston Celtics. Braun played in five NBA All-Star Games and scored 10,625 points in his professional career. Braun was a player-coach for the Knicks in 1960 and 1961 as well, compiling a 40–87 head coaching record.

He did not play in the NBA during the 1950–1951 or 1951–1952 seasons after being drafted into the United States Army. However, he would join and play for the Washington Capitols in the brief period of time where they played for the American Basketball League before they were forced to fold operations for good on January 11, 1952. After completing basic training at Fort Bragg, Braun served in the cadre to train new recruits and was an athletic and recreational officer. He continued to play basketball on the base, winning back-to-back Fort Bragg championships before being selected to represent the base in the 1952 Third Army Tournament. Bragg went 4–1 in the tournament and won the final against Fort Jackson (who gave Bragg their only loss); Braun was voted most valuable player after scoring 151 points. The title qualified Bragg for the All-Army Tournament, where they were eliminated by Fort Dix in the first round despite Braun leading all players with 35 points. When his service permitted, Braun also played for the semi-pro Washington Capitols in 1951–52, with whom he recorded 101 points across his first four games before ending his tenure with over 20 points per game. He was discharged in September 1952 as a corporal.

Braun is featured in the 1948 Bowman set of basketball cards, the 1957 Topps set, and the 1961 Fleer set. Though sportscaster Marty Glickman made the term "swish" a popular basketball colloquialism, he attributed the genesis of the word to Braun, who he heard say it following a good shot during warmup. Glickman used the term frequently in broadcasts throughout the 1950s. Braun was elected to the National Basketball Hall of Fame in 2019.

== Personal life ==
Braun was born in Brooklyn and moved to Garden City, New York as a teenager where he went to high school and lived most of his adult life. After retiring from professional sports, Braun was a Wall Street stockbroker. He retired to Florida around 1990. He married his wife Joan in 1952 with whom he had four daughters Susan, Patricia, Nancy and Carol, and six grandchildren. He and Joan were married 58 years.

Braun was the childhood idol of longtime NBA commissioner David Stern as a child.

== BAA/NBA career statistics ==
Legend
GP	Games played	GS	Games started	MPG	Minutes per game
FG%	Field goal percentage	3P%	3-point field goal percentage	FT%	Free throw percentage
RPG	Rebounds per game	APG	Assists per game	SPG	Steals per game
BPG	Blocks per game	PPG	Points per game	**Bold**	Career high
†	Won an NBA championship

=== Regular season ===
Year	Team	GP	MPG	FG%	FT%	RPG	APG	PPG
1947–48	New York	47	–	.323	.650	–	1.3	14.3
1948–49	New York	57	–	.330	.760	–	3.0	14.2
1949–50	New York	67	–	.364	.762	–	3.7	15.4
1952–53	New York	70	33.1	.400	.825	3.3	3.5	14.0
1953–54	New York	**72**	33.0	.400	.825	3.4	2.9	14.8
1954–55	New York	71	**34.9**	.388	.801	4.2	3.9	15.1
1955–56	New York	**72**	32.2	.372	.838	3.6	4.1	15.4
1956–57	New York	**72**	32.6	.381	.809	3.6	3.6	13.9
1957–58	New York	71	**34.9**	.418	**.849**	**4.6**	**5.5**	**16.5**
1958–59	New York	**72**	27.2	.420	.826	3.5	4.8	10.5
1959–60	New York	54	28.0	.432	.838	3.1	5.0	12.9
1960–61	New York	15	14.5	**.468**	.786	2.1	3.2	5.7
1961–62†	Boston	48	8.6	.377	.741	1.0	1.5	3.7
Career		788	29.8	.383	.804	3.4	3.7	13.5
All-Star		5	18.0	.481	1.000	2.5	1.6	6.0

=== Playoffs ===
Year	Team	GP	MPG	FG%	FT%	RPG	APG	PPG
1948	New York	3	–	.293	.600	–	.7	10.0
1949	New York	6	–	.324	.806	–	3.2	**19.3**
1950	New York	5	–	**.412**	.763	–	3.8	17.0
1953	New York	**11**	34.0	.324	.806	4.0	2.8	13.5
1954	New York	4	31.3	.346	.875	3.0	2.3	17.8
1955	New York	3	**34.3**	.409	**.900**	**4.7**	**5.3**	18.0
1959	New York	2	31.0	.375	.889	2.0	5.0	16.0
1962†	Boston	6	7.0	.393	.750	1.2	.3	4.2
Career		40	27.2	.350	.812	3.1	2.7	14.0

== Head coaching record ==
Team	Year	G	W	L	W–L%	Finish	PG	PW	PL	PW–L%	Result
New York	1959–60	48	19	29	.396	4th in Eastern	—	—	—	—	Missed playoffs
New York	1960–61	79	21	58	.266	4th in Pacific	—	—	—	—	Missed playoffs
Career		127	40	87	.315		0	0	0	–	

== See also ==
- Baseball in the United States
- Basketball in the United States
