= 1952–53 Minneapolis Lakers season =

NBA professional basketball team season (won championship)

- NBA champions
- Division champions
- Head coach: John Kundla
- Arena: Minneapolis Auditorium

Results
- Record: 48–22 (.686)
- Place: Division: 1st (Western)
- Playoff finish: NBA champions (Defeated Knickerbockers 4–1)
- Stats at Basketball Reference
- Radio: WLOL

The 1952–53 Minneapolis Lakers season was the fifth season for the franchise in the National Basketball Association (NBA). The Lakers continued to be the dominant force in the league as they won the Western Division with a 48–22 record. In the playoffs, the Lakers would sweep the Indianapolis Olympians in 2 straight. In the Western Finals, the Lakers would win the first 2 games at home. Against the Fort Wayne Pistons, the Lakers were pushed to a 5th game. The series returned to Minneapolis, where the Lakers won the 5th game 74–58. In the Finals, the Lakers vanquished the New York Knickerbockers for their 2nd straight Championship, and 4th Championship overall in the franchise's first five seasons in the NBA. HoopsHype later ranked this squad as the team with the fourth-easiest path to an NBA Finals championship, noting them as the team who had the easiest path while facing off against opponents who held mostly above-average records that season, with the only outlier being their first round opponent of the Indianapolis Olympians under their final season of existence.

== Roster ==
1952–53 Minneapolis Lakers roster
Players

Pos.	No.	Player	Height	Weight	DOB	From
SG	16	Bob Harrison	6 ft 1 in (1.85 m)	190 lb (86 kg)	1927-08-12	Michigan
PF	11	Lew Hitch	6 ft 8 in (2.03 m)	200 lb (91 kg)	1929-07-16	Kansas State
SF	12, 13	Jim Holstein	6 ft 3 in (1.91 m)	180 lb (82 kg)	1930-09-24	Cincinnati
PG	22	Slater Martin	5 ft 10 in (1.78 m)	170 lb (77 kg)	1925-10-22	Texas
C	99	George Mikan	6 ft 10 in (2.08 m)	245 lb (111 kg)	1924-06-18	DePaul
PF	19	Vern Mikkelsen	6 ft 7 in (2.01 m)	230 lb (104 kg)	1928-10-21	Hamline
SF	17	Jim Pollard	6 ft 4 in (1.93 m)	185 lb (84 kg)	1922-07-09	Stanford
SG	18	Pep Saul	6 ft 2 in (1.88 m)	185 lb (84 kg)	1924-02-16	Seton Hall
F		Dick Schnittker	6 ft 5 in (1.96 m)	200 lb (91 kg)	1928-05-27	Ohio State
PF	12	Howie Schultz	6 ft 6 in (1.98 m)	200 lb (91 kg)	1922-07-03	Hamline
SG	20	Whitey Skoog	5 ft 11 in (1.80 m)	180 lb (82 kg)	1926-11-02	Minnesota

Coaches
Head coach
- John Kundla

Legend
- (DP) Unsigned draft pick
- (FA) Free agent
- (S) Suspended
- Injured

Roster

== Regular season ==
=== Season standings ===
Western Division	W	L	PCT	GB	Home	Road	Neutral	Div
x-Minneapolis Lakers	48	22	.686	-	24–2	16–15	8–5	17–13
x-Rochester Royals	44	26	.629	4	24–8	13–17	7–1	27–13
x-Fort Wayne Pistons	36	33	.522	11.5	25–9	8–19	3–5	18–22
x-Indianapolis Olympians	28	43	.394	20.5	19–14	4–23	5–6	15–26
Milwaukee Hawks	27	44	.380	21.5	14–8	3–24	10–12	15–26

=== Game log ===
#	Date	Opponent	Score	High points	Record
1	November 1	Boston	91–94	Vern Mikkelsen (17)	1–0
2	November 2	@ Fort Wayne	81–69	Jim Pollard (18)	2–0
3	November 5	@ Baltimore	97–75	Slater Martin (21)	3–0
4	November 8	@ Philadelphia	93–71	George Mikan (18)	4–0
5	November 9	@ Syracuse	89–96	George Mikan (25)	4–1
6	November 11	@ Boston	101–92	Slater Martin (20)	5–1
7	November 13	@ New York	91–100	George Mikan (32)	5–2
8	November 15	@ Rochester	89–97	George Mikan (29)	5–3
9	November 16	Milwaukee	51–87	George Mikan (14)	6–3
10	November 20	@ Fort Wayne	89–81	George Mikan (32)	7–3
11	November 22	Fort Wayne	89–96	George Mikan (35)	8–3
12	November 23	@ Milwaukee	62–46	George Mikan (17)	9–3
13	November 27	Indianapolis	69–90	Vern Mikkelsen (19)	10–3
14	November 28	@ Indianapolis	97–82	Slater Martin (22)	11–3
15	November 29	@ Rochester	71–83	Jim Pollard (17)	11–4
16	November 30	Philadelphia	66–91	George Mikan (23)	12–4
17	December 1	N Baltimore	67–89	Mikan, Mikkelsen (17)	13–4
18	December 3	@ Boston	106–102 (OT)	Jim Pollard (29)	14–4
19	December 4	@ New York	81–71	Vern Mikkelsen (24)	15–4
20	December 6	New York	78–85 (OT)	George Mikan (27)	16–4
21	December 8	N Indianapolis	76–81	George Mikan (25)	16–5
22	December 11	Syracuse	79–82	Vern Mikkelsen (31)	17–5
23	December 14	Rochester	77–95	Slater Martin (17)	18–5
24	December 19	@ Indianapolis	87–69	Slater Martin (22)	19–5
25	December 20	@ Milwaukee	75–86	Vern Mikkelsen (28)	19–6
26	December 25	Indianapolis	73–90	George Mikan (20)	20–6
27	December 27	Boston	71–94	Jim Pollard (20)	21–6
28	December 28	Milwaukee	77–86	Harrison, Mikkelsen (17)	22–6
29	December 30	@ Indianapolis	69–74	George Mikan (16)	22–7
30	December 31	Baltimore	56–82	George Mikan (19)	23–7
31	January 2	N Milwaukee	74–66	Vern Mikkelsen (22)	24–7
32	January 3	N Milwaukee	79–75	Slater Martin (22)	25–7
33	January 4	Rochester	80–83 (OT)	George Mikan (23)	26–7
34	January 6	N Rochester	85–69	George Mikan (26)	26–8
35	January 8	@ Syracuse	67–75	George Mikan (16)	26–9
36	January 10	N Fort Wayne	79–84	George Mikan (29)	27–9
37	January 11	New York	79–85	George Mikan (22)	28–9
38	January 14	@ Baltimore	112–104 (2OT)	George Mikan (46)	29–9
39	January 17	@ Rochester	101–109	George Mikan (41)	29–10
40	January 18	Milwaukee	83–70	George Mikan (22)	29–11
41	January 23	N Milwaukee	65–67	George Mikan (22)	29–12
42	January 25	Boston	82–87	George Mikan (30)	30–12
43	January 27	N Fort Wayne	96–76	Jim Pollard (23)	31–12
44	January 29	Syracuse	83–65	George Mikan (13)	31–13
45	January 31	Fort Wayne	80–87	George Mikan (23)	32–13
46	February 1	@ Fort Wayne	92–76	Slater Martin (19)	33–13
47	February 3	@ Indianapolis	93–96 (3OT)	George Mikan (29)	33–14
48	February 5	New York	73–81	George Mikan (36)	34–14
49	February 7	@ Rochester	72–87	George Mikan (25)	34–15
50	February 8	Indianapolis	67–71	George Mikan (24)	35–15
51	February 12	Syracuse	81–91	George Mikan (36)	36–15
52	February 14	Philadelphia	84–92	George Mikan (19)	37–15
53	February 15	@ Milwaukee	80–71	George Mikan (23)	38–15
54	February 17	N Baltimore	74–70	Vern Mikkelsen (19)	38–16
55	February 19	Rochester	87–107	Mikan, Pollard (17)	39–16
56	February 21	Fort Wayne	75–85	Jim Pollard (17)	40–16
57	February 22	@ Fort Wayne	78–90	George Mikan (26)	40–17
58	February 24	@ New York	63–79	Jim Pollard (12)	40–18
59	February 25	@ Baltimore	85–72	George Mikan (20)	41–18
60	February 26	@ Philadelphia	85–73	George Mikan (25)	42–18
61	February 27	N Philadelphia	75–98	George Mikan (22)	43–18
62	March 1	N Philadelphia	80–102	George Mikan (33)	44–18
63	March 3	N Fort Wayne	86–68	Vern Mikkelsen (23)	45–18
64	March 5	@ Syracuse	91–94	Vern Mikkelsen (23)	45–19
65	March 6	@ Boston	85–100	Vern Mikkelsen (21)	45–20
66	March 7	@ Rochester	82–84	Vern Mikkelsen (17)	45–21
67	March 8	Milwaukee	73–100	George Mikan (18)	46–21
68	March 9	N Indianapolis	83–95	Vern Mikkelsen (22)	46–22
69	March 12	Rochester	77–89	George Mikan (28)	47–22
70	March 17	@ Indianapolis	73–71	Pollard, Skoog (14)	48–22

== Player stats ==
Note: GP= Games played; REB= Rebounds; AST= Assists; STL = Steals; BLK = Blocks; PTS = Points; AVG = Average

Player	GP	REB	AST	STL	BLK	PTS	AVG

== Playoffs ==
1953 playoff game log
Division Semifinals: 2–0 (home: 1–0; road: 1–0)

Game	Date	Team	Score	High points	Location	Series
1	March 22	Indianapolis	W 85–69	Vern Mikkelsen (18)	Minneapolis Auditorium	1–0
2	March 23	@ Indianapolis	W 81–79	Pollard, Mikkelsen (16)	Butler Fieldhouse	2–0

Division Finals: 3–2 (home: 3–0; road: 0–2)

Game	Date	Team	Score	High points	Location	Series
1	March 26	Fort Wayne	W 83–73	George Mikan (21)	Minneapolis Auditorium	1–0
2	March 28	Fort Wayne	W 82–75	George Mikan (20)	Minneapolis Auditorium	2–0
3	March 30	@ Fort Wayne	L 95–98	George Mikan (23)	War Memorial Coliseum	2–1
4	April 1	@ Fort Wayne	L 82–85	George Mikan (25)	War Memorial Coliseum	2–2
5	April 2	Fort Wayne	W 74–58	Mikan, Martin (18)	Minneapolis Auditorium	3–2

NBA Finals: 4–1 (home: 1–1; road: 3–0)

Game	Date	Team	Score	High points	High assists	Location Attendance	Series
1	April 4	New York	L 88–96	George Mikan (25)	—	Minneapolis Auditorium; 5,000	0–1
2	April 5	New York	W 73–71	George Mikan (18)	—	Minneapolis Auditorium; 4,848	1–1
3	April 7	@ New York	W 90–75	George Mikan (20)	—	69th Regiment Armory; 5,100	2–1
4	April 8	@ New York	W 71–69	George Mikan (27)	—	69th Regiment Armory; 5,200	3–1
5	April 10	@ New York	W 91–84	Jim Pollard (17)	Vern Mikkelsen (6)	69th Regiment Armory; 5,200	4–1

1953 schedule

== Awards and honors ==
- George Mikan, All-NBA First Team
- Vern Mikkelsen, All-NBA Second Team
- George Mikan, NBA All-Star Game
- Vern Mikkelsen, NBA All-Star Game
- Slater Martin, NBA All-Star Game
- George Mikan, NBA All-Star Game Most Valuable Player Award
