= 1952–53 Boston Celtics season =

NBA basketball team season

- Head coach: Red Auerbach
- Arena: Boston Arena; Boston Garden

Results
- Record: 46–25 (.648)
- Place: Division: 3rd (Eastern)
- Playoff finish: East Division finals (lost to Knicks 1–3)
- Stats at Basketball Reference

The 1952–53 Boston Celtics season was the Celtics' seventh season in the NBA.

== Offseason ==
=== NBA draft ===
| Round | Pick | Player | Position | Nationality | School/Club team |
| 1 | 6 | Bill Stauffer | F | United States | Missouri |
| 4 | 7 | Herm Hedderick | SG | United States | Canisius |
| 10 | 4 | Gene Conley | F/C | United States | Washington |

== Roster ==
1952–53 Boston Celtics roster
Players

| Pos. | No. | Player | Height | Weight | DOB | From |
|---|---|---|---|---|---|---|
| PF | 18 | Bob Brannum | 6 ft 5 in (1.96 m) | 215 lb (98 kg) | 1925–05–28 | Michigan |
| PF | 17 | Gene Conley | 6 ft 8 in (2.03 m) | 225 lb (102 kg) | 1930–11–10 | Washington |
| SF | 11 | Chuck Cooper | 6 ft 5 in (1.96 m) | 210 lb (95 kg) | 1926–09–29 | Duquesne |
| PG | 14 | Bob Cousy | 6 ft 1 in (1.85 m) | 175 lb (79 kg) | 1928–08–09 | Holy Cross |
| SG | 12 | Bob Donham | 6 ft 2 in (1.88 m) | 190 lb (86 kg) | 1926–10–11 | Ohio State |
| SF | 13 | Bob Harris | 6 ft 7 in (2.01 m) | 195 lb (88 kg) | 1927–03–16 | Oklahoma State |
| F/C | 10 | Kleggie Hermsen | 6 ft 9 in (2.06 m) | 225 lb (102 kg) | 1923–03–12 | Minnesota |
| C | 22 | Ed Macauley | 6 ft 8 in (2.03 m) | 185 lb (84 kg) | 1928–03–22 | Saint Louis |
| C | 16 | John Mahnken | 6 ft 8 in (2.03 m) | 220 lb (100 kg) | 1922–06–16 | Georgetown |
| F | 19 | Mo Mahoney | 6 ft 2 in (1.88 m) | 205 lb (93 kg) | 1927–11–20 | Brown |
| PG | 4 | Kenny Rollins | 6 ft 0 in (1.83 m) | 168 lb (76 kg) | 1923–09–14 | Kentucky |
| SG | 21 | Bill Sharman | 6 ft 1 in (1.85 m) | 175 lb (79 kg) | 1926–05–25 | USC |

Coaches
Head coach
- Red Auerbach

Legend
- (DP) Unsigned draft pick
- (FA) Free agent
- (S) Suspended
- Injured

Roster

== Regular season ==
| Eastern Division | W | L | PCT | GB | Home | Road | Neutral | Div |
|---|---|---|---|---|---|---|---|---|
| x-New York Knicks | 47 | 23 | .671 | - | 22-4 | 15-14 | 10-5 | 30-10 |
| x-Syracuse Nationals | 47 | 24 | .662 | 0.5 | 32-2 | 10-20 | 5-2 | 26-15 |
| x-Boston Celtics | 46 | 25 | .648 | 1.5 | 21-3 | 11-18 | 14-4 | 28-13 |
| x-Baltimore Bullets | 16 | 54 | .229 | 31 | 11-20 | 1–19 | 4-15 | 10-30 |
| Philadelphia Warriors | 12 | 57 | .174 | 34.5 | 5-12 | 1–28 | 6-17 | 7-33 |

x = clinched playoff spot

=== Game log ===
1952–53 game log
| # | Date | Opponent | Score | High points | Record |
| 1 | October 31 | @ Indianapolis | 83–68 | Bob Cousy (22) | 1–0 |
| 2 | November 1 | @ Minneapolis | 91–94 | Ed Macauley (37) | 1–1 |
| 3 | November 8 | Syracuse | 83–106 | Bob Cousy (27) | 2–1 |
| 4 | November 11 | Minneapolis | 101–92 | Ed Macauley (25) | 2–2 |
| 5 | November 13 | @ Syracuse | 81–96 | Bob Cousy (25) | 2–3 |
| 6 | November 15 | @ New York | 68–79 | Bob Cousy (23) | 2–4 |
| 7 | November 16 | Rochester | 87–96 | Ed Macauley (27) | 3–4 |
| 8 | November 19 | N Milwaukee | 77–91 | Bob Cousy (24) | 4–4 |
| 9 | November 22 | Indianapolis | 91–96 | Ed Macauley (23) | 5–4 |
| 10 | November 23 | @ Rochester | 102–100 | Bob Cousy (26) | 6–4 |
| 11 | November 26 | Philadelphia | 92–93 | Bob Cousy (30) | 7–4 |
| 12 | November 27 | @ Philadelphia | 83–70 | Ed Macauley (21) | 8–4 |
| 13 | November 29 | N Fort Wayne | 71–78 | Bob Cousy (27) | 9–4 |
| 14 | November 30 | @ Syracuse | 66–78 | Bob Cousy (28) | 9–5 |
| 15 | December 3 | Minneapolis | 106–102 (OT) | Bob Cousy (28) | 9–6 |
| 16 | December 4 | N Milwaukee | 90–73 | Bob Cousy (23) | 9–7 |
| 17 | December 6 | Milwaukee | 83–88 | Ed Macauley (16) | 10–7 |
| 18 | December 9 | N Philadelphia | 72–86 | Ed Macauley (29) | 11–7 |
| 19 | December 10 | N Philadelphia | 97–103 | Bob Cousy (30) | 12–7 |
| 20 | December 11 | N Baltimore | 94–88 | Bill Sharman (42) | 13–7 |
| 21 | December 13 | Philadelphia | 78–82 | Bill Sharman (22) | 14–7 |
| 22 | December 14 | @ Baltimore | 83–73 | Bob Cousy (23) | 15–7 |
| 23 | December 18 | N Syracuse | 83–88 | Bob Cousy (26) | 16–7 |
| 24 | December 20 | Syracuse | 77–91 | Ed Macauley (31) | 17–7 |
| 25 | December 21 | @ Syracuse | 86–90 | Ed Macauley (21) | 17–8 |
| 26 | December 25 | @ New York | 84–97 | Bill Sharman (25) | 17–9 |
| 27 | December 26 | @ Indianapolis | 74–85 | Bill Sharman (20) | 17–10 |
| 28 | December 27 | @ Minneapolis | 71–94 | Bill Sharman (20) | 17–11 |
| 29 | December 28 | @ Fort Wayne | 89–66 | Bob Cousy (22) | 18–11 |
| 30 | December 31 | Syracuse | 87–97 | Bill Sharman (29) | 19–11 |
| 31 | January 1 | @ Rochester | 83–81 (OT) | Bob Cousy (24) | 20–11 |
| 32 | January 3 | N Indianapolis | 63–78 | Bob Cousy (20) | 21–11 |
| 33 | January 4 | New York | 100–103 | Ed Macauley (28) | 22–11 |
| 34 | January 7 | @ Philadelphia | 84–82 | Bill Sharman (34) | 23–11 |
| 35 | January 8 | N Rochester | 85–88 (OT) | Ed Macauley (28) | 24–11 |
| 36 | January 9 | N Baltimore | 90–94 | Bob Cousy (22) | 24–12 |
| 37 | January 10 | @ Baltimore | 105–126 | Bill Sharman (33) | 24–13 |
| 38 | January 11 | Baltimore | 87–131 | Ed Macauley (25) | 25–13 |
| 39 | January 15 | @ Fort Wayne | 85–91 | Bill Sharman (26) | 25–14 |
| 40 | January 16 | @ Milwaukee | 100–90 | Bill Sharman (29) | 26–14 |
| 41 | January 18 | New York | 83–99 | Ed Macauley (33) | 27–14 |
| 42 | January 21 | Fort Wayne | 84–94 | Bob Cousy (29) | 28–14 |
| 43 | January 22 | N New York | 112–89 | Bill Sharman (20) | 28–15 |
| 44 | January 23 | @ Indianapolis | 85–90 | Ed Macauley (24) | 28–16 |
| 45 | January 25 | @ Minneapolis | 82–87 | Bob Cousy (18) | 28–17 |
| 46 | January 27 | N Milwaukee | 58–80 | Cousy, Macauley (22) | 29–17 |
| 47 | January 29 | @ Fort Wayne | 98–111 | Bob Cousy (27) | 29–18 |
| 48 | January 31 | @ New York | 69–76 | Bill Sharman (23) | 29–19 |
| 49 | February 1 | Rochester | 109–86 | Ed Macauley (25) | 29–20 |
| 50 | February 4 | Syracuse | 92–105 | Bill Sharman (32) | 30–20 |
| 51 | February 7 | @ Baltimore | 101–98 (OT) | Ed Macauley (33) | 31–20 |
| 52 | February 8 | New York | 79–87 | Bill Sharman (20) | 32–20 |
| 53 | February 12 | @ Philadelphia | 91–92 | Ed Macauley (25) | 32–21 |
| 54 | February 13 | Milwaukee | 74–77 | Ed Macauley (25) | 33–21 |
| 55 | February 15 | Indianapolis | 76–89 | Ed Macauley (20) | 34–21 |
| 56 | February 17 | N Syracuse | 84–65 | Cousy, Sharman (14) | 34–22 |
| 57 | February 18 | N New York | 66–69 | Ed Macauley (16) | 35–22 |
| 58 | February 21 | @ Baltimore | 90–86 | Cousy, Macauley (23) | 36–22 |
| 59 | February 22 | New York | 83–87 (OT) | Bob Cousy (27) | 37–22 |
| 60 | February 25 | Philadelphia | 80–87 | Cousy, Macauley (22) | 38–22 |
| 61 | February 26 | N Baltimore | 82–81 | Ed Macauley (23) | 39–22 |
| 62 | February 28 | @ Rochester | 81–77 | Bill Sharman (22) | 39–23 |
| 63 | March 3 | N Baltimore | 95–94 (OT) | Bob Cousy (32) | 40–23 |
| 64 | March 4 | N Philadelphia | 75–82 | Ed Macauley (17) | 41–23 |
| 65 | March 6 | Minneapolis | 85–100 | Ed Macauley (46) | 42–23 |
| 66 | March 8 | @ New York | 89–78 | Ed Macauley (25) | 43–23 |
| 67 | March 11 | Fort Wayne | 92–98 | Ed Macauley (28) | 44–23 |
| 68 | March 12 | @ Syracuse | 70–84 | Bob Cousy (15) | 44–24 |
| 69 | March 15 | Philadelphia | 87–103 | Ed Macauley (26) | 45–24 |
| 70 | March 16 | N Baltimore | 92–78 | Ed Macauley (19) | 46–24 |
| 71 | March 17 | @ Syracuse | 68–72 | Bob Cousy (16) | 46–25 |

== Playoffs ==
1953 playoff game log
Division Semi-finals: 2–0 (home: 1–0; road: 1–0)

| Game | Date | Team | Score | High points | High assists | Location | Series |
|---|---|---|---|---|---|---|---|
| 1 | March 19 | @ Syracuse | W 87–81 | Bob Cousy (20) | — | Onondaga War Memorial | 1–0 |
| 2 | March 21 | Syracuse | W 111–105 (4OT) | Bob Cousy (50) | Macauley, Sharman (5) | Boston Garden | 2–0 |

Division finals: 1–3 (home: 1–1; road: 0–2)

| Game | Date | Team | Score | High points | High assists | Location | Series |
|---|---|---|---|---|---|---|---|
| 1 | March 25 | @ New York | L 91–95 | Bob Cousy (28) | Chuck Cooper (6) | Madison Square Garden III | 0–1 |
| 2 | March 26 | New York | W 86–70 | Macauley, Cousy (21) | Bob Cousy (13) | Boston Garden | 1–1 |
| 3 | March 28 | @ New York | L 82–101 | Bob Cousy (18) | Ed Macauley (5) | Madison Square Garden III | 1–2 |
| 4 | March 29 | New York | L 75–82 | Ed Macauley (25) | Bob Cousy (8) | Boston Garden | 1–3 |

1953 schedule

== Awards and records ==
- Ed Macauley, All-NBA First Team
- Bob Cousy, All-NBA First Team
- Bill Sharman, All-NBA Second Team

== See also ==
- 1952-53 NBA season
