= 1952–53 Philadelphia Warriors season =

NBA professional basketball team season

- Head coach: Edward Gottlieb
- Arena: Philadelphia Civic Center

Results
- Record: 12–57 (.174)
- Place: Division: 5th (Eastern)
- Playoff finish: Did not qualify
- Stats at Basketball Reference
- Radio: WCAU

The 1952–53 Philadelphia Warriors season was the Warriors' 7th season in the NBA.

== Regular season ==
=== Season standings ===
Eastern Division	W	L	PCT	GB	Home	Road	Neutral	Div
x-New York Knicks	47	23	.671	-	22-4	15-14	10-5	30-10
x-Syracuse Nationals	47	24	.662	0.5	32-2	10-20	5-2	26-15
x-Boston Celtics	46	25	.648	1.5	21-3	11-18	14-4	28-13
x-Baltimore Bullets	16	54	.229	31	11-20	1–19	4-15	10-30
Philadelphia Warriors	12	57	.174	34.5	5-12	1–28	6-17	7-33

x – clinched playoff spot

=== Game log ===
1952–53 Game log
#	Date	Opponent	Score	High points	Record
1	November 1	Syracuse	86–84 (OT)	Andy Phillip (21)	1–0
2	November 2	@ Syracuse	91–117	Claude Overton (25)	1–1
3	November 8	Minneapolis	71–93	Neil Johnston (21)	1–2
4	November 14	Indianapolis	71–77	Neil Johnston (13)	1–3
5	November 15	vs. Indianapolis	76–79	Neil Johnston (20)	1–4
6	November 16	vs. Baltimore	81–79	Don Lofgran (20)	2–4
7	November 18	vs. Milwaukee	83–82	Neil Johnston (23)	3–4
8	November 19	@ Baltimore	89–106	Don Lofgran (23)	3–5
9	November 20	Baltimore	106–99	Neil Johnston (31)	4–5
10	November 22	vs. Baltimore	95–96	Neil Johnston (21)	4–6
11	November 23	@ Fort Wayne	80–92	Johnston, Phillip (21)	4–7
12	November 26	@ Boston	92–93	Neil Johnston (29)	4–8
13	November 27	Boston	70–83	Andy Phillip (15)	4–9
14	November 28	vs. Milwaukee	77–78 (2OT)	Neil Johnston (21)	4–10
15	November 30	@ Minneapolis	66–91	Neil Johnston (30)	4–11
16	December 2	New York	82–89 (OT)	Neil Johnston (25)	4–12
17	December 3	vs. New York	75–100	Neil Johnston (22)	4–13
18	December 6	Syracuse	74–82	Neil Johnston (31)	4–14
19	December 7	@ Rochester	92–94	Neil Johnston (24)	4–15
20	December 9	vs. Boston	72–86	Jerry Fleishman (18)	4–16
21	December 10	vs. Boston	97–103	Neil Johnston (32)	4–17
22	December 11	Rochester	98–86	Neil Johnston (20)	5–17
23	December 13	@ Boston	78–82	Fulks, Johnston, Lofgran (15)	5–18
24	December 14	@ Syracuse	83–102	Neil Johnston (26)	5–19
25	December 16	vs. Fort Wayne	64–95	Neil Johnston (18)	5–20
26	December 18	Fort Wayne	79–86	Neil Johnston (17)	5–21
27	December 21	@ Fort Wayne	71–74	Neil Johnston (23)	5–22
28	December 25	Rochester	78–93	Jerry Fleishman (21)	5–23
29	December 28	@ New York	54–72	Neil Johnston (16)	5–24
30	January 1	New York	82–108	Neil Johnston (28)	5–25
31	January 3	@ Baltimore	77–81	Neil Johnston (26)	5–26
32	January 4	@ Fort Wayne	68–79	Joe Fulks (23)	5–27
33	January 6	@ Indianapolis	76–71	Neil Johnston (26)	6–27
34	January 7	Boston	82–84	Neil Johnston (20)	6–28
35	January 10	vs. Syracuse	77–87	Neil Johnston (34)	6–29
36	January 11	@ Syracuse	72–76	Neil Johnston (32)	6–30
37	January 17	@ New York	76–84	Neil Johnston (27)	6–31
38	January 18	vs. Indianapolis	74–76 (OT)	Neil Johnston (23)	6–32
39	January 25	@ Baltimore	68–82	Joe Fulks (19)	6–33
40	January 29	New York	61–72	Neil Johnston (21)	6–34
41	January 31	@ Rochester	83–103	Joe Fulks (19)	6–35
42	February 1	vs. New York	85–90	Neil Johnston (22)	6–36
43	February 4	vs. Baltimore	96–88	Danny Finn (30)	7–36
44	February 7	@ New York	63–86	Neil Johnston (30)	7–37
45	February 8	@ Syracuse	89–98	Neil Johnston (28)	7–38
46	February 10	@ Rochester	85–101	Neil Johnston (26)	7–39
47	February 12	Boston	92–91	Danny Finn (27)	8–39
48	February 14	@ Minneapolis	84–92	Neil Johnston (24)	8–40
49	February 15	vs. Baltimore	95–75	Neil Johnston (32)	9–40
50	February 17	@ Indianapolis	77–80	Neil Johnston (32)	9–41
51	February 21	@ New York	69–85	Neil Johnston (23)	9–42
52	February 22	@ Syracuse	73–86	Neil Johnston (26)	9–43
53	February 23	vs. Milwaukee	64–78	Danny Finn (25)	9–44
54	February 24	vs. Syracuse	63–74	Neil Johnston (21)	9–45
55	February 25	@ Boston	80–87	Joe Fulks (21)	9–46
56	February 26	Minneapolis	73–85	Neil Johnston (24)	9–47
57	February 27	vs. Minneapolis	75–98	Joe Fulks (23)	9–48
58	February 28	@ Milwaukee	73–87	Neil Johnston (28)	9–49
59	March 1	vs. Minneapolis	80–102	Neil Johnston (28)	9–50
60	March 3	@ Indianapolis	73–90	Neil Johnston (23)	9–51
61	March 4	vs. Boston	75–82	Neil Johnston (30)	9–52
62	March 5	vs. Rochester	78–69	Neil Johnston (21)	10–52
63	March 7	vs. Syracuse	88–87	Neil Johnston (25)	11–52
64	March 10	vs. Milwaukee	76–77	Neil Johnston (19)	11–53
65	March 11	vs. Milwaukee	72–69 (OT)	Neil Johnston (26)	12–53
66	March 12	New York	85–90	Joe Fulks (29)	12–54
67	March 13	vs. Baltimore	72–98	Neil Johnston (20)	12–55
68	March 14	@ Baltimore	85–87	Neil Johnston (27)	12–56
69	March 15	@ Boston	87–103	Neil Johnston (33)	12–57

== Awards and records ==
- Neil Johnston, NBA All-Star Game
- Neil Johnston, NBA Scoring Champion
- Neil Johnston, All-NBA First Team
- Andy Phillip, All-NBA Second Team

== See also ==
- 1952-53 NBA season
