= 1953 NBA playoffs =

Postseason tournament

Tournament details
- Dates: March 17 – April 10, 1953
- Season: 1952–53
- Teams: 8

Final positions
- Champions: Minneapolis Lakers (4th title)
- Runner-up: New York Knicks
- Semifinalists: Fort Wayne Pistons; Boston Celtics

The 1953 NBA playoffs was the postseason tournament of the National Basketball Association's 1952–53 season. The tournament concluded with the Western Conference champion Minneapolis Lakers defeating the Eastern Conference champion New York Knicks 4 games to 1 in the NBA Finals.

The Lakers won their fourth championship in the last five years, and defeated the Knicks in the Finals for the second straight season to complete their run.

Not only did the four Western Division teams meet for the third straight year, but the Eastern Division teams this year, had a slight change. The Philadelphia Warriors did not make the playoffs, but the Baltimore Bullets did. They would be swept by the Eastern Division champion New York Knicks in 2 games.

The Indianapolis Olympians played their last game, a Game 2 loss to the Lakers in the first round. They folded at the end of the season, and major professional basketball did not return to Indianapolis, Indiana until the Indiana Pacers were founded for the inaugural 1967–68 season of the American Basketball Association.

The Boston Celtics earned their first playoff series victory with a two-game sweep of the Syracuse Nationals.

The 1952–53 Baltimore Bullets hold the distinction of having the worst regular-season record of any playoff qualifier in league history, at 16–54.

== Bracket ==
Division Semifinals
E1	New York*	2
E4	Baltimore	0
Eastern Division
E3	Boston	2
E2	Syracuse	0
W1	Minneapolis*	2
W4	Indianapolis	0
Western Division
W3	Fort Wayne	2
W2	Rochester	1

Division Finals
E1	New York*	3
E3	Boston	1
W1	Minneapolis*	3
W3	Fort Wayne	2

NBA Finals
E1	New York*	1
W1	Minneapolis*	4

- * Division winner
- Bold Series winner
- Italic Team with home-court advantage in NBA Finals

== Division Semifinals ==
=== Eastern Division Semifinals ===
==== (1) New York Knicks vs. (4) Baltimore Bullets ====
March 17

Boxscore

Baltimore Bullets 62, New York Knicks 80
Scoring by quarter: 13–12, 19–21, 11–20, 19–27
Pts: Jim Baechtold 17	Pts: Connie Simmons 25
New York leads series, 1–0

Madison Square Garden III, Manhattan, New York

March 20

Boxscore

New York Knicks 90, Baltimore Bullets 81
Scoring by quarter: 20–14, 23–24, 21–24, 26–19
Pts: Vince Boryla 20	Pts: Baechtold, Miller 21 each
New York wins series, 2–0

Baltimore Coliseum, Baltimore, Maryland

This was the third playoff meeting between these two teams, with each team splitting the first two meetings.

Previous playoff series
Tied 1–1 in all-time playoff series

1948

Baltimore Bullets 2, New York Knicks 1

1948 BAA First Round

1949

Baltimore Bullets 1, New York Knicks 2

1949 Eastern Division Semifinals

==== (2) Syracuse Nationals vs. (3) Boston Celtics ====
March 19

Boxscore

Boston Celtics 87, Syracuse Nationals 81
Scoring by quarter: 16–19, 19–14, 18–16, 34–32
Pts: Bob Cousy 20	Pts: Paul Seymour 18
Boston leads series, 1–0

Onondaga War Memorial, Syracuse, New York

March 21

Boxscore

Syracuse Nationals 105, Boston Celtics 111 (4OT)
Scoring by quarter: 22–21, 20–19, 17–22, 18–15, Overtime: 9–9, 4–4, 9–9, 6–12
Pts: Red Rocha 19; Asts: George King 4	Pts: Bob Cousy 50; Asts: Macauley, Sharman 5 each
Boston wins series, 2–0

Boston Garden, Boston, Massachusetts

- Al Cervi’s final NBA game.

This was the first playoff meeting between these two teams. This series featured the last quadruple overtime game until 2019.

=== Western Division Semifinals ===
==== (1) Minneapolis Lakers vs. (4) Indianapolis Olympians ====
March 22

Boxscore

Indianapolis Olympians 69, Minneapolis Lakers 85
Scoring by quarter: 14–21, 17–21, 25–21, 13–22
Pts: Joe Graboski 22	Pts: Vern Mikkelsen 18
Minneapolis leads series, 1–0

Minneapolis Auditorium, Minneapolis, Minnesota

March 23

Boxscore

Minneapolis Lakers 81, Indianapolis Olympians 79
Scoring by quarter: 24–19, 10–13, 25–17, 22–30
Pts: Pollard, Mikkelsen 16 each	Pts: Paul Walther 17
Minneapolis wins series, 2–0

Butler Fieldhouse, Indianapolis, Indiana

This was the third playoff meeting between these two teams, with the Lakers winning the first two meetings.

Previous playoff series
Minneapolis leads 2–0 in all-time playoff series

1951

Indianapolis Olympians 1, Minneapolis Lakers 2

1951 Western Division Semifinals

1952

Indianapolis Olympians 0, Minneapolis Lakers 2

1952 Western Division Semifinals

==== (2) Rochester Royals vs. (3) Fort Wayne Pistons ====
March 20

Boxscore

Fort Wayne Pistons 84, Rochester Royals 77
Scoring by quarter: 14–16, 23–21, 21–20, 26–20
Pts: Fred Schaus 20	Pts: Arnie Risen 17
Fort Wayne leads series, 1–0

Edgerton Park Arena, Rochester, New York

March 22

Boxscore

Rochester Royals 83, Fort Wayne Pistons 71
Scoring by quarter: 21–19, 19–19, 17–13, 26–20
Pts: Bobby Wanzer 19	Pts: Larry Foust 24
Series tied, 1–1

War Memorial Coliseum, Fort Wayne, Indiana

March 24

Boxscore

Fort Wayne Pistons 67, Rochester Royals 65
Scoring by quarter: 23–18, 13–13, 15–18, 16–16
Pts: Larry Foust 18	Pts: Bobby Wanzer 17
Fort Wayne wins series, 2–1

Edgerton Park Arena, Rochester, New York

This was the fourth playoff meeting between these two teams, with the Royals winning two of the first three meetings.

Previous playoff series
Rochester leads 2–1 in all-time playoff series

1950

Fort Wayne Pistons 2, Rochester Royals 0

1950 Central Division Semifinals

1951

Fort Wayne Pistons 1, Rochester Royals 2

1951 Western Division Semifinals

1952

Fort Wayne Pistons 0, Rochester Royals 2

1952 Western Division Semifinals

== Division Finals ==
=== Eastern Division Finals ===
==== (1) New York Knicks vs. (3) Boston Celtics ====
March 25

Boxscore

Boston Celtics 91, New York Knicks 95
Scoring by quarter: 27–26, 15–16, 18–27, 31–26
Pts: Bob Cousy 28; Asts: Chuck Cooper 6	Pts: Connie Simmons 18; Asts: Dick McGuire 8
New York leads series, 1–0

Madison Square Garden III, Manhattan, New York

March 26

Boxscore

New York Knicks 70, Boston Celtics 86
Scoring by quarter: 10–23, 19–13, 15–21, 26–29
Pts: Harry Gallatin 17; Asts: Carl Braun 7	Pts: Macauley, Cousy 21 each Asts: Bob Cousy 13
Series tied, 1–1

Boston Garden, Boston, Massachusetts

March 28

Boxscore

Boston Celtics 82, New York Knicks 101
Scoring by quarter: 22–20, 15–23, 18–32, 27–26
Pts: Bob Cousy 18; Asts: Ed Macauley 5	Pts: Harry Gallatin 23; Asts: Dick McGuire 11
New York leads series, 2–1

Madison Square Garden III, Manhattan, New York
Referees: Phil Fox, Charles Eckman

March 29

Boxscore

New York Knicks 82, Boston Celtics 75
Scoring by quarter: 17–26, 14–19, 22–11, 29–19
Pts: Carl Braun 18; Asts: Nat Clifton 9	Pts: Ed Macauley 25; Asts: Bob Cousy 8
New York wins series, 3–1

Boston Garden, Boston, Massachusetts
Referees: Phil Fox, Charles Eckman

This was the third playoff meeting between these two teams, with the Knicks winning the first two meetings.

Previous playoff series
New York leads 2–0 in all-time playoff series

1951

Boston Celtics 0, New York Knicks 2

1951 Eastern Division Semifinals

1952

Boston Celtics 1, New York Knicks 2

1952 Eastern Division Semifinals

=== Western Division Finals ===
==== (1) Minneapolis Lakers vs. (3) Fort Wayne Pistons ====
March 26

Boxscore

Fort Wayne Pistons 73, Minneapolis Lakers 83
Scoring by quarter: 16–24, 14–19, 12–13, 31–27
Pts: Larry Foust 16	Pts: George Mikan 21
Minneapolis leads series, 1–0

Minneapolis Auditorium, Minneapolis, Minnesota

March 28

Boxscore

Fort Wayne Pistons 75, Minneapolis Lakers 82
Scoring by quarter: 18–16, 17–23, 18–17, 22–26
Pts: Larry Foust 21	Pts: George Mikan 20
Minneapolis leads series, 2–0

Minneapolis Auditorium, Minneapolis, Minnesota
Referees: Jocko Collins, Arnie Heft

March 30

Boxscore

Minneapolis Lakers 95, Fort Wayne Pistons 98
Scoring by quarter: 16–29, 28–18, 17–24, 34–27
Pts: George Mikan 23	Pts: Fred Scolari 27
Minneapolis leads series, 2–1

War Memorial Coliseum, Fort Wayne, Indiana

April 1

Boxscore

Minneapolis Lakers 82, Fort Wayne Pistons 85
Scoring by quarter: 20–25, 18–22, 23–11, 21–27
Pts: George Mikan 25	Pts: Larry Foust 20
Series tied, 2–2

War Memorial Coliseum, Fort Wayne, Indiana

April 2

Boxscore

Fort Wayne Pistons 58, Minneapolis Lakers 74
Scoring by quarter: 9–23, 16–11, 12–19, 21–21
Pts: Larry Foust 16	Pts: Mikan, Martin 18 each
Minneapolis wins series, 3–2

Minneapolis Auditorium, Minneapolis, Minnesota

This was the second playoff meeting between these two teams, with the Lakers winning the first meeting.

Previous playoff series
Minneapolis leads 1–0 in all-time playoff series

1950

Fort Wayne Pistons 0, Minneapolis Lakers 2

1950 Central Division Finals

== NBA Finals: (W1) Minneapolis Lakers vs. (E1) New York Knicks ==
April 4

Boxscore

New York Knicks 96, Minneapolis Lakers 88
Scoring by quarter: 19–18, 24–29, 23–20, 30–21
Pts: Carl Braun 21	Pts: George Mikan 25
New York leads series, 1–0

Minneapolis Auditorium, Minneapolis, Minnesota
Attendance: 5,000
Referees: Sid Borgia, Arnie Heft

April 5

Boxscore

New York Knicks 71, Minneapolis Lakers 73
Scoring by quarter: 16–26, 14–21, 24–11, 17–15
Pts: Connie Simmons 17	Pts: George Mikan 18
Series tied, 1–1

Minneapolis Auditorium, Minneapolis, Minnesota
Attendance: 4,848
Referees: Sid Borgia, Arnie Heft

April 7

Boxscore

Minneapolis Lakers 90, New York Knicks 75
Scoring by quarter: 21–14, 18–24, 26–22, 25–15
Pts: George Mikan 20	Pts: Connie Simmons 18
Minneapolis leads series, 2–1

69th Regiment Armory, Manhattan, New York
Attendance: 5,100

April 8

Boxscore

Minneapolis Lakers 71, New York Knicks 69
Scoring by quarter: 21–16, 20–18, 13–16, 17–19
Pts: George Mikan 27	Pts: Connie Simmons 17
Minneapolis leads series, 3–1

69th Regiment Armory, Manhattan, New York
Attendance: 5,200

April 10

Boxscore

Minneapolis Lakers 91, New York Knicks 84
Scoring by quarter: 19–18, 25–17, 25–25, 22–24
Pts: Jim Pollard 17; Asts: Vern Mikkelsen 6	Pts: Carl Braun 19; Asts: Ernie Vandeweghe 4
Minneapolis wins series, 4–1

69th Regiment Armory, Manhattan, New York
Attendance: 5,200

This was the second playoff meeting between these two teams, with the Lakers winning the first meeting.

Previous playoff series
Minneapolis leads 1–0 in all-time playoff series

1952

Minneapolis Lakers 4, New York Knicks 3

1952 NBA Finals
