= 1952–53 Baltimore Bullets season =

- Head coach: Chick Reiser; Clair Bee
- Arena: Baltimore Coliseum

Results
- Record: 16–54 (.229)
- Place: Division: 4th (Eastern)
- Playoff finish: East Division Semifinals (eliminated 0-2)
- Stats at Basketball Reference

Local media
- Television: WAAM
- Radio: WITH

The 1952-53 Baltimore Bullets season was the Bullets' 6th season in the NBA and 9th overall season of existence. The team featured Hall of Fame center Don Barksdale. After coach Chick Reiser's firing on November 12, 1952 following his compilation of an overall 8–22 for his time coaching the Bullets, Baltimore replaced him with Clair Bee, who himself was a Hall of Fame head coach who was best known for his time coaching the LIU Brooklyn Blackbirds men's basketball team up until the aftermath of the CCNY point-shaving scandal caused Long Island University as a whole to rethink their own sports programs as a whole by this point in time. Bee would later become the final long-term head coach of the original Bullets franchise's history, including for most of the final season they'd ever play in the NBA. Their .229 winning percentage is the lowest of any team in the four major North American sports leagues to ever qualify for the playoffs, with Baltimore winning four more games than the Philadelphia Warriors to earn the final playoff spot in the Eastern Division this season. Despite that interesting factoid, the original Bullets franchise would never again make it to the NBA Playoffs, as the franchise folded early on into what would have been their 1954–55 season.

== Draft picks ==
Round	Pick	Player	Position	Nationality	College
1	2	Jim Baechtold	G/F	United States	Eastern Kentucky

== Roster ==
Baltimore Bullets roster
Players

Pos.	No.	Player	Height	Weight	DOB	From
SF	18	Jim Baechtold	6 ft 4 in (1.93 m)	190 lb (86 kg)		Eastern Kentucky
PF	17	Don Barksdale	6 ft 6 in (1.98 m)	200 lb (91 kg)		Temple
G/F		Don Boven	6 ft 4 in (1.93 m)	210 lb (95 kg)		Western Michigan
SF	9	Dick Bunt	6 ft 0 in (1.83 m)	170 lb (77 kg)		NYU
G		Blaine Denning	6 ft 2 in (1.88 m)	175 lb (79 kg)		Lawrence Technological
C	16	Don Henriksen	6 ft 7 in (2.01 m)	225 lb (102 kg)		California
SG	11	Paul Hoffman	6 ft 2 in (1.88 m)	195 lb (88 kg)		Purdue
SF	9	George Kaftan	6 ft 3 in (1.91 m)	190 lb (86 kg)		Holy Cross
PF	12	Jack Kerris	6 ft 6 in (1.98 m)	215 lb (98 kg)		Loyola Chicago
G/F		Frank Kudelka	6 ft 2 in (1.88 m)	193 lb (88 kg)		Saint Mary's
PG	8	Ray Lumpp	6 ft 1 in (1.85 m)	178 lb (81 kg)		NYU
F	10	George McLeod	6 ft 5 in (1.96 m)	200 lb (91 kg)		TCU
F/C		Stan Miasek	6 ft 5 in (1.96 m)	210 lb (95 kg)
C	15	Eddie Miller	6 ft 8 in (2.03 m)	210 lb (95 kg)		Syracuse
G/F		Dave Minor	6 ft 2 in (1.88 m)	185 lb (84 kg)		UCLA
PG	20	Ralph O'Brien	5 ft 9 in (1.75 m)	160 lb (73 kg)		Butler
SG	7	Kevin O'Shea	6 ft 2 in (1.88 m)	175 lb (79 kg)		Notre Dame
F	9, 10	Bob Priddy	6 ft 3 in (1.91 m)	190 lb (86 kg)		New Mexico State
PF		George Ratkovicz	6 ft 6 in (1.98 m)	220 lb (100 kg)		Lindblom Technical High School
PG		Fred Scolari	5 ft 10 in (1.78 m)	180 lb (82 kg)		San Francisco

Coaches
Head coach
- Chick Reiser
  Clair Bee

Legend
- (DP) Unsigned draft pick
- (FA) Free agent
- (S) Suspended
- Injured

=== Game log ===
1952–53 Game log
#	Date	Opponent	Score	High points	Record
1	November 1	@ New York	53–69	Fred Scolari (11)	0–1
2	November 5	Minneapolis	97–75	Don Barksdale (19)	0–2
3	November 8	New York	92–62	Stan Miasek (14)	0–3
4	November 12	Milwaukee	90–107	Hoffman, Ratkovicz (18)	1–3
5	November 15	Syracuse	91–97 (OT)	Fred Scolari (18)	2–3
6	November 16	vs. Philadelphia	81–79	Fred Scolari (17)	2–4
7	November 19	Philadelphia	89–106	Fred Scolari (24)	3–4
8	November 20	@ Philadelphia	99–106	Don Barksdale (18)	3–5
9	November 22	vs. Philadelphia	95–96	George Kaftan (29)	4–5
10	November 23	Indianapolis	100–90	George Kaftan (19)	4–6
11	November 25	@ Rochester	89–106	Stan Miasek (16)	4–7
12	November 26	New York	94–92	Fred Scolari (22)	4–8
13	November 27	vs. New York	104–92	Stan Miasek (22)	4–9
14	November 29	Syracuse	87–74	Don Barksdale (23)	4–10
15	November 30	@ Fort Wayne	95–100 (2OT)	Fred Scolari (22)	4–11
16	December 1	vs. Minneapolis	89–67	Fred Scolari (13)	4–12
17	December 3	Milwaukee	87–98	Fred Scolari (26)	5–12
18	December 6	Fort Wayne	103–91	Stan Miasek (20)	5–13
19	December 10	Rochester	99–97 (OT)	Fred Scolari (23)	5–14
20	December 11	vs. Boston	94–88	Don Barksdale (24)	5–15
21	December 14	Boston	83–73	Jim Baechtold (19)	5–16
22	December 20	New York	102–99 (OT)	Eddie Miller (25)	5–17
23	December 21	@ New York	77–102	Fred Scolari (14)	5–18
24	December 25	@ Syracuse	92–102	Fred Scolari (19)	5–19
25	December 27	Syracuse	81–76 (OT)	Fred Scolari (25)	5–20
26	December 31	@ Minneapolis	56–82	Eddie Miller (18)	5–21
27	January 1	@ Milwaukee	83–81 (OT)	Don Barksdale (19)	6–21
28	January 2	@ Indianapolis	66–73	Ray Lumpp (15)	6–22
29	January 3	Philadelphia	77–81	Fred Scolari (25)	7–22
30	January 4	@ Syracuse	68–93	Barksdale, Miller (17)	7–23
31	January 9	vs. Boston	90–94	Paul Hoffman (32)	8–23
32	January 10	Boston	105–126	Baechtold, Henriksen (23)	9–23
33	January 11	@ Boston	87–131	Paul Hoffman (18)	9–24
34	January 14	Minneapolis	112–104 (2OT)	Eddie Miller (24)	9–25
35	January 17	Indianapolis	66–82	Don Barksdale (27)	10–25
36	January 18	@ Syracuse	84–103	Fred Scolari (17)	10–26
37	January 21	Rochester	89–82	Miller, Scolari (14)	10–27
38	January 25	Philadelphia	68–82	Eddie Miller (15)	11–27
39	January 28	Milwaukee	84–83	Fred Scolari (21)	11–28
40	January 29	vs. Milwaukee	70–67	Eddie Miller (12)	11–29
41	January 31	Indianapolis	90–97	Don Henriksen (18)	12–29
42	February 1	@ Syracuse	79–94	Eddie Miller (27)	12–30
43	February 2	vs. Syracuse	98–77	Jim Baechtold (16)	12–31
44	February 3	@ Rochester	82–109	Ray Lumpp (21)	12–32
45	February 4	vs. Philadelphia	96–88	Eddie Miller (27)	12–33
46	February 7	Boston	101–98 (OT)	Ray Lumpp (25)	12–34
47	February 8	@ Fort Wayne	78–89	Don Barksdale (19)	12–35
48	February 10	@ Indianapolis	83–88	Eddie Miller (20)	12–36
49	February 11	New York	86–80	Eddie Miller (22)	12–37
50	February 12	vs. Milwaukee	92–85	Don Barksdale (19)	12–38
51	February 13	vs. New York	106–96	Eddie Miller (22)	12–39
52	February 14	Fort Wayne	102–88	Don Barksdale (18)	12–40
53	February 15	vs. Philadelphia	95–75	Don Barksdale (22)	12–41
54	February 17	vs. Minneapolis	74–70	Baechtold, Barksdale (16)	13–41
55	February 19	@ Fort Wayne	79–83	Jack Kerris (23)	13–42
56	February 20	@ Indianapolis	58–59	Don Henriksen (15)	13–43
57	February 21	Boston	90–86	Jim Baechtold (21)	13–44
58	February 25	Minneapolis	85–72	Ray Lumpp (17)	13–45
59	February 26	vs. Boston	82–81	Don Henriksen (19)	13–46
60	February 28	Syracuse	74–77	Barksdale, Hoffman (22)	14–46
61	March 3	vs. Boston	95–94 (OT)	Eddie Miller (25)	14–47
62	March 4	Rochester	81–77	Baechtold, Barksdale (17)	14–48
63	March 5	vs. New York	80–69	Ray Lumpp (26)	14–49
64	March 7	Fort Wayne	83–81 (OT)	Ray Lumpp (22)	14–50
65	March 8	@ Syracuse	91–98	Jim Baechtold (17)	14–51
66	March 11	vs. New York	113–107 (3OT)	Jim Baechtold (30)	14–52
67	March 13	vs. Philadelphia	72–98	Paul Hoffman (17)	15–52
68	March 14	Philadelphia	85–87	Baechtold, Henriksen, Lumpp (19)	16–52
69	March 15	@ Rochester	87–105	Eddie Miller (20)	16–53
70	March 16	vs. Boston	92–78	Jack Kerris (17)	16–54

== NBA Playoffs ==
=== NBA East Division Semifinals ===
(1) New York Knicks vs. (4) Baltimore Bullets: Knicks win series 2-0

- Game 1 @ New York: New York 80, Baltimore 62
- Game 2 @ Baltimore: New York 90, Baltimore 81

Last Playoff Meeting: 1949 BAA Eastern Division Semifinals (New York won 2–1)
