= 1952–53 NBA season =

Seventh NBA season

- League: National Basketball Association
- Sport: Basketball
- Duration: October 31, 1952 – March 17, 1953; March 17 – April 2, 1953 (Playoffs); April 4–10, 1953 (Finals)
- Games: 69-71
- Teams: 10

Draft
- Top draft pick: Mark Workman
- Picked by: Baltimore Bullets

Regular season
- Top seed: Minneapolis Lakers
- Top scorer: Neil Johnston (Philadelphia)

Playoffs
- Eastern champions: New York Knicks
- Eastern runners-up: Boston Celtics
- Western champions: Minneapolis Lakers
- Western runners-up: Fort Wayne Pistons

Finals
- Champions: Minneapolis Lakers
- Runners-up: New York Knicks

NBA seasons
- ← 1951–52 1953–54 →

The 1952–53 NBA season was the seventh season of the National Basketball Association. The season ended with the Minneapolis Lakers winning the NBA championship, beating the New York Knicks 4 games to 1 in the NBA Finals.

== Notable occurrences ==
- The 1953 NBA All-Star Game was played in Fort Wayne, Indiana, with the West beating the East 79–75. George Mikan of the Minneapolis Lakers won the game's MVP award.
- Don Meineke of the Fort Wayne Pistons wins the inaugural Rookie of the Year award.

Coaching changes
Offseason
Team	1951–52 coach	1952–53 coach
Milwaukee Hawks	Doxie Moore	Andrew Levane
In-season
Team	Outgoing coach	Incoming coach
Baltimore Bullets	Chick Reiser	Clair Bee

== Final standings ==
=== Eastern Division ===
Eastern Division	W	L	PCT	GB	Home	Road	Neutral	Div
x-New York Knicks	47	23	.671	-	22-4	15-14	10-5	30-10
x-Syracuse Nationals	47	24	.662	0.5	32-2	10-20	5-2	26-15
x-Boston Celtics	46	25	.648	1.5	21-3	11-18	14-4	28-13
x-Baltimore Bullets	16	54	.229	31	11-20	1–19	4-15	10-30
Philadelphia Warriors	12	57	.174	34.5	5-12	1–28	6-17	7-33

=== Western Division ===
Western Division	W	L	PCT	GB	Home	Road	Neutral	Div
x-Minneapolis Lakers	48	22	.686	-	24–2	16–15	8–5	17–13
x-Rochester Royals	44	26	.629	4	24–8	13–17	7–1	27–13
x-Fort Wayne Pistons	36	33	.522	11.5	25–9	8–19	3–5	18–22
x-Indianapolis Olympians	28	43	.394	20.5	19–14	4–23	5–6	15–26
Milwaukee Hawks	27	44	.380	21.5	14–8	3–24	10–12	15–26

x – clinched playoff spot

== Playoffs ==
Division Semifinals
E1	New York*	2
E4	Baltimore	0
Eastern Division
E3	Boston	2
E2	Syracuse	0
W1	Minneapolis*	2
W4	Indianapolis	0
Western Division
W3	Fort Wayne	2
W2	Rochester	1

Division Finals
E1	New York*	3
E3	Boston	1
W1	Minneapolis*	3
W3	Fort Wayne	2

NBA Finals
E1	New York*	1
W1	Minneapolis*	4

- * Division winner
- Bold Series winner
- Italic Team with home-court advantage in NBA Finals

== Statistics leaders ==
Category	Player	Team	Stat
Points	Neil Johnston	Philadelphia Warriors	1,564
Rebounds	George Mikan	Minneapolis Lakers	1,007
Assists	Bob Cousy	Boston Celtics	547
FG%	Neil Johnston	Philadelphia Warriors	.452
FT%	Bill Sharman	Boston Celtics	.850

Note: Prior to the 1969–70 season, league leaders in points, rebounds, and assists were determined by totals rather than averages.

== NBA awards ==
This season marked the first official season where the NBA would officially name the NBA Rookie of the Year Award winner after previously having Rookie of the Year winners only being recognized by newspaper writers when the NBA officially didn't recognize them in the past. (While the NBA would eventually later publish official recorded results for the pre-1953 Rookie of the Year winners in their 1994–95 edition of the Official NBA Guide and the 1994 Official NBA Basketball Encyclopedia, those winners have not been listed in subsequent publications ever since then.)

- Rookie of the Year: Don Meineke, Fort Wayne Pistons
- All-NBA First Team:
  - George Mikan, Minneapolis Lakers
  - Neil Johnston, Philadelphia Warriors
  - Bob Cousy, Boston Celtics
  - Ed Macauley, Boston Celtics
  - Dolph Schayes, Syracuse Nationals
- All-NBA Second Team:
  - Bob Davies, Rochester Royals
  - Vern Mikkelsen, Minneapolis Lakers
  - Andy Phillip, Philadelphia Warriors
  - Bill Sharman, Boston Celtics
  - Bobby Wanzer, Rochester Royals

== See also ==
- List of NBA regular season records
