= List of 1951–52 NBA season transactions =

This is a list of all personnel changes for the 1951 NBA off-season and 1951–52 NBA season.

== Events ==
=== July 14, 1951 ===
- The Syracuse Nationals traded Alex Hannum and Fred Scolari to the Baltimore Bullets for Red Rocha.

=== September 25, 1951 ===
- The Minneapolis Lakers sold Kevin O'Shea to the Milwaukee Hawks.

=== October 10, 1951 ===
The Fort Wayne Pistons sold Howie Schultz to the Minneapolis Lakers. Schultz was traded to Tri-Cities on May 31, 1951, but evidently he was returned.

=== October 17, 1951 ===
- The Boston Celtics sold Frank Kudelka to the Baltimore Bullets. Report says Boston also gave up a 1st round draft pick for Bob Brannum but he was already sold to them on September 23, 1950.

=== November ?, 1951 ===
- The Fort Wayne Pistons released Don Otten.

=== November 5, 1951 ===
- The Baltimore Bullets sold Walt Budko to the Philadelphia Warriors.

=== November 23, 1951 ===
- The Milwaukee Hawks signed Don Otten as a free agent.

=== November 29, 1951 ===
- The Baltimore Bullets sold Don Rehfeldt to the Milwaukee Hawks.

=== December 26, 1951 ===
- The Baltimore Bullets sold Red Owens to the Milwaukee Hawks.

=== January ?, 1952 ===
- The Milwaukee Hawks signed Dillard Crocker as a free agent.

=== January 18, 1952 ===
- The Baltimore Bullets sold Alex Hannum to the Rochester Royals.

=== January 26, 1952 ===
- The Baltimore Bullets sold Pep Saul to the Minneapolis Lakers.

=== February 3, 1952 ===
- The Milwaukee Hawks sold Kevin O'Shea to the Baltimore Bullets.

=== February 11, 1952 ===
- The Fort Wayne Pistons traded Art Burris and cash to the Milwaukee Hawks for Dike Eddleman.

== Notes ==
- ^{a} Number of years played in the NBA prior to the draft
- ^{b} Career with the franchise that drafted the player
- ^{c} Never played a game for the franchise
