= 1950 NCAA Men's Basketball All-Americans =

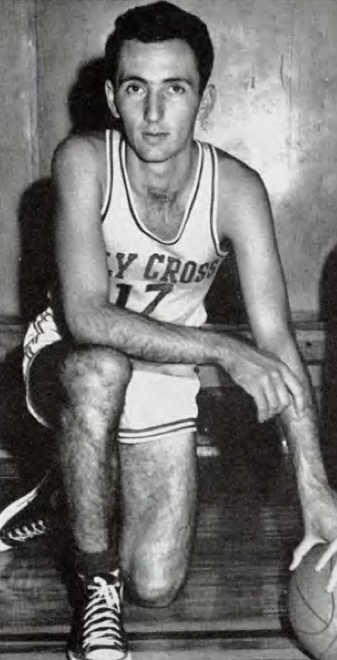
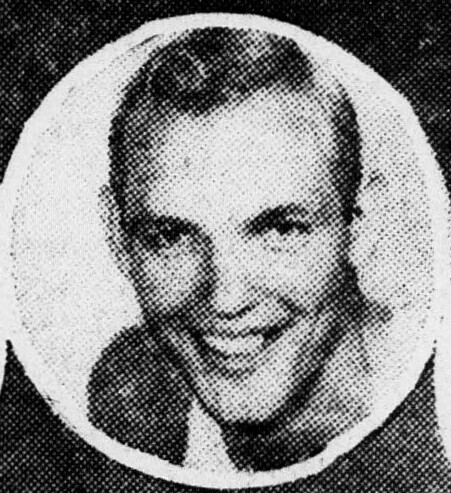
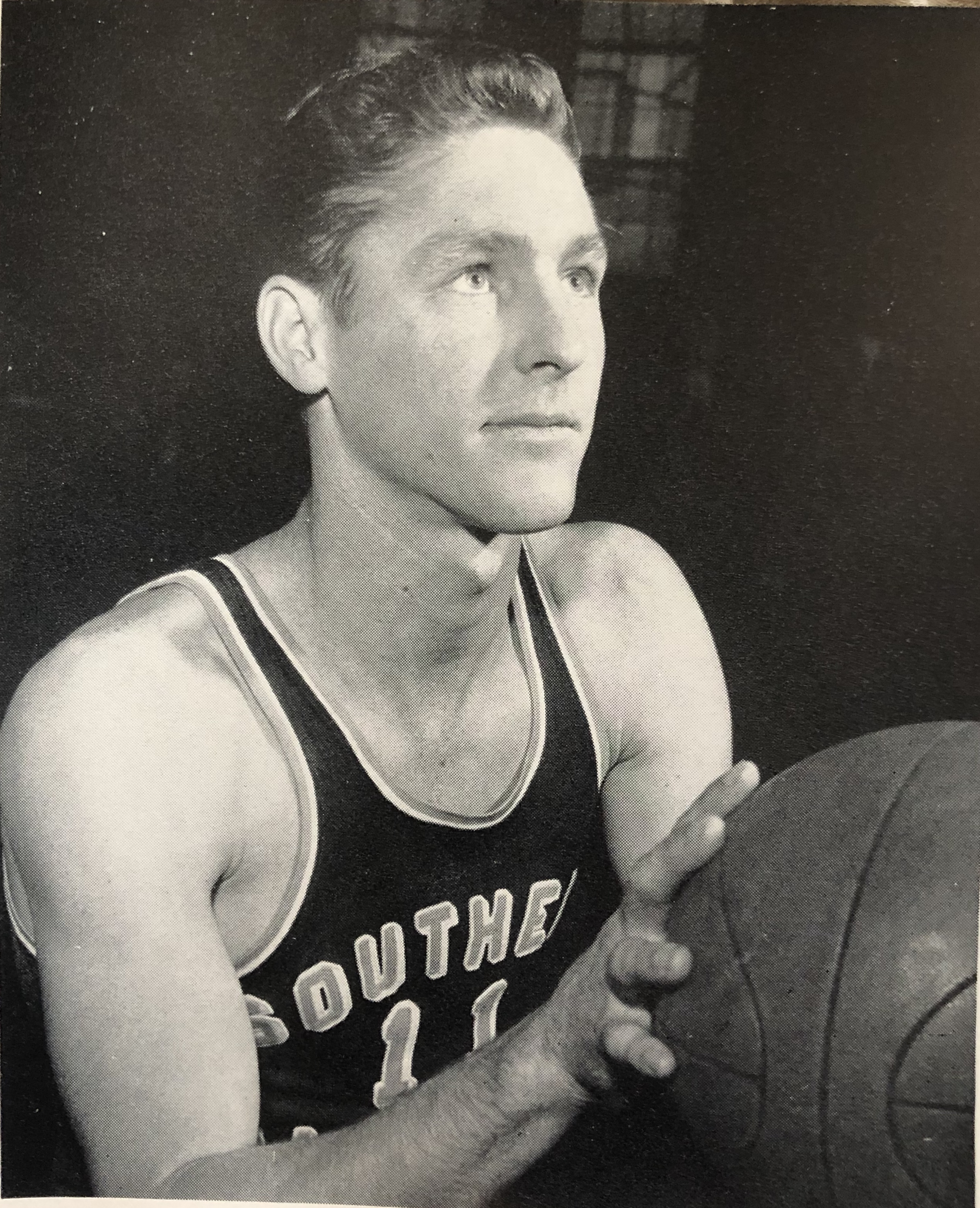
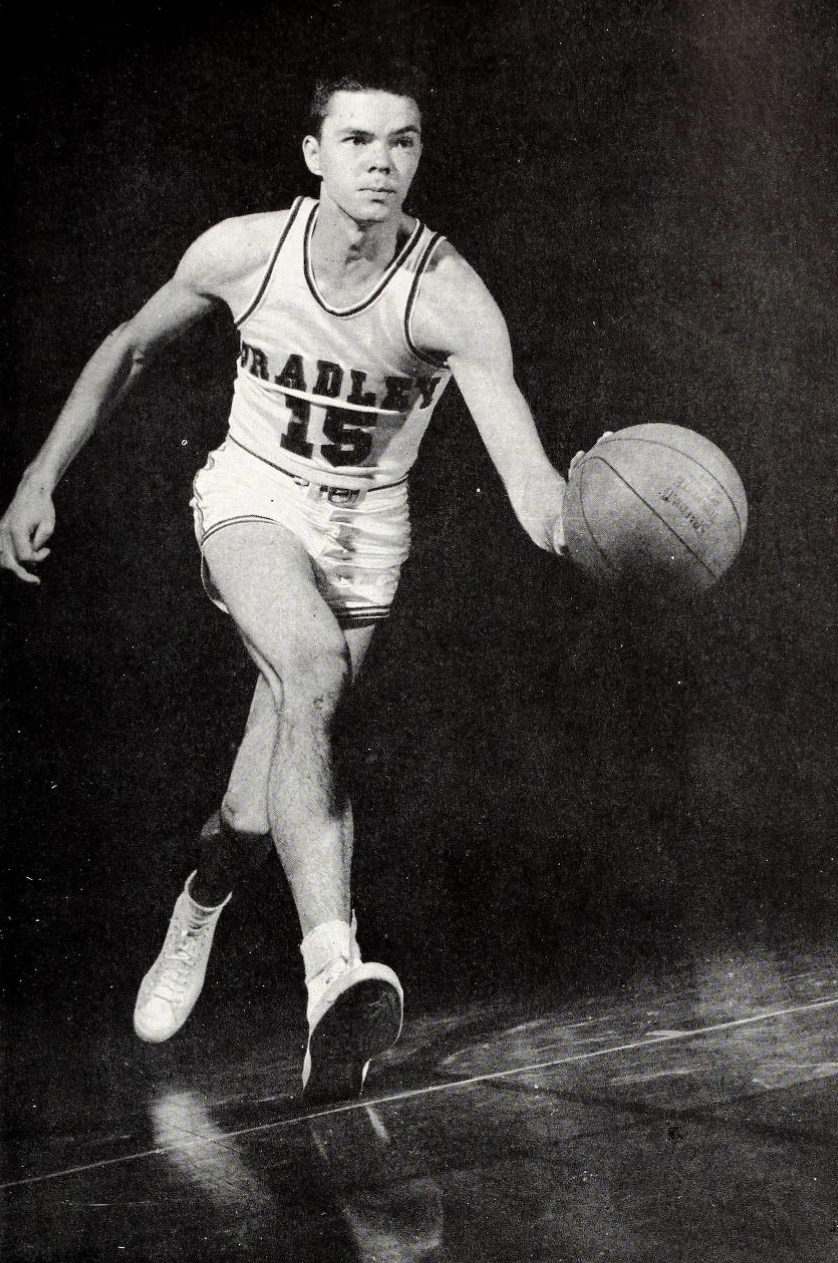
- Members of the 1950 Consensus All-America first team. Clockwise from upper left: Cousy, Schnittker, Unruh and Sharman. Not pictured: Arizin.
- Awarded for: 1949–50 NCAA men's basketball season

The consensus 1950 College Basketball All-American team, as determined by aggregating the results of five major All-American teams. To earn "consensus" status, a player must win honors from a majority of the following teams: the Associated Press, Look Magazine, The United Press International, Collier's Magazine and the International News Service.

== 1950 Consensus All-America team ==
Consensus First Team
Player	Position	Class	Team
Paul Arizin	F	Senior	Villanova
Bob Cousy	G	Senior	Holy Cross
Dick Schnittker	F	Senior	Ohio State
Bill Sharman	G	Senior	Southern California
Paul Unruh	F	Senior	Bradley

Consensus Second Team
Player	Position	Class	Team
Chuck Cooper	F	Senior	Duquesne
Don Lofgran	F/C	Senior	San Francisco
Kevin O'Shea	G	Senior	Notre Dame
Don Rehfeldt	F	Senior	Wisconsin
Sherman White	C	Junior	Long Island

== Individual All-America teams ==
All-America Team
All-America Team	First team		Second team		Third team	
All-America Team	Player	School	Player	School	Player	School
Associated Press	Paul Arizin	Villanova	Dick Dickey	North Carolina State	Clyde Lovellette	Kansas
Associated Press	Bob Cousy	Holy Cross	Don Lofgran	San Francisco	Don Rehfeldt	Wisconsin
Associated Press	Kevin O'Shea	Notre Dame	Sam Ranzino	North Carolina State	Chuck Share	Bowling Green
Associated Press	Dick Schnittker	Ohio State	Bill Sharman	Southern California	Bill Spivey	Kentucky
Associated Press	Paul Unruh	Bradley	Whitey Skoog	Minnesota	Sherman White	Long Island
UPI	Paul Arizin	Villanova	Don Lofgran	San Francisco	Chuck Cooper	Duquesne
UPI	Bob Cousy	Holy Cross	Gene Melchiorre	Bradley	Dick Dickey	North Carolina State
UPI	Kevin O'Shea	Notre Dame	Don Rehfeldt	Wisconsin	Jim Line	Kentucky
UPI	Dick Schnittker	Ohio State	Bill Sharman	Southern California	Chuck Share	Bowling Green
UPI	Paul Unruh	Bradley	Sherman White	Long Island	Bill Spivey	Kentucky
Look Magazine	Paul Arizin	Villanova	Don Lofgran	San Francisco	No third team	
Look Magazine	Chuck Cooper	Duquesne	Kevin O'Shea	Notre Dame	No third team	
Look Magazine	Bob Cousy	Holy Cross	John Pilch	Wyoming	No third team	
Look Magazine	Dick Schnittker	Ohio State	Don Rehfeldt	Wisconsin	No third team	
Look Magazine	Paul Unruh	Bradley	Sherman White	Long Island	No third team	
International News Service	Paul Arizin	Villanova	Chuck Cooper	Duquesne	No third team	
International News Service	Bob Cousy	Holy Cross	Bob Lavoy	Western Kentucky	No third team	
International News Service	Dick Schnittker	Ohio State	Don Lofgran	San Francisco	No third team	
International News Service	Bill Sharman	Southern California	Bill Spivey	Kentucky	No third team	
International News Service	Paul Unruh	Bradley	Sherman White	Long Island	No third team	
Collier's	Bob Cousy	Holy Cross	Paul Arizin	Villanova	No third team	
Collier's	Dick Schnittker	Ohio State	Chet Giermak	William & Mary	No third team	
Collier's	Bill Sharman	Southern California	Don Lofgran	San Francisco	No third team	
Collier's	Paul Unruh	Bradley	John Pilch	Wyoming	No third team	
Collier's	Sherman White	Long Island	Don Rehfeldt	Wisconsin	No third team	

AP Honorable Mention

- Billy Joe Adcock, Vanderbilt
- Leon Blevins, Arizona
- Ron Bontemps, Beloit
- Clarence Brannum, Kansas State
- Art Burris, Tennessee
- Gerald Calabrese, St. John's
- Buddy Cate, Western Kentucky
- Chuck Cooper, Duquesne
- Ed Dahler, Duquesne
- Loy Doty, Wyoming
- Nate DeLong, River Falls Teachers
- Bill Erickson, Illinois
- Larry Foust, La Salle
- Bill Garrett, Indiana
- Ed Gayda, Washington State
- Chet Giermak, William & Mary
- Rick Harman, Kansas State
- Hal Haskins, Hamline
- Rene Herrerias, San Francisco
- Walter Hirsch, Kentucky
- George King, Morris Harvey
- Bob Lavoy, Western Kentucky
- Jim Line, Kentucky
- Al McGuire, St. John's
- Gene Melchiorre, Bradley
- Ken Murray, St. Bonaventure
- Ralph O'Brien, Butler
- Frank Oftring, Holy Cross
- John Pilch, Wyoming
- Jack Shelton, Oklahoma A&M
- Jim Slaughter, South Carolina
- George Stanich, UCLA
- Lou Watson, Indiana
- Bus Whitehead, Nebraska
- Zeke Zawoluk, St. John's

== See also ==
- 1949–50 NCAA men's basketball season
