= Pacific Division (NBA) =

Division of the Western Conference of the National Basketball Association

- Conference: Western Conference
- League: National Basketball Association
- Sport: Basketball
- First season: 1970–71 season
- No. of teams: 5
- Most recent champion: Los Angeles Lakers (26th title) (2025–26)
- Most titles: Los Angeles Lakers (26 titles)

Pacific Division Teams Location

The Pacific Division is one of the three divisions in the Western Conference of the National Basketball Association (NBA). The division consists of five teams: the Golden State Warriors, the Los Angeles Clippers, the Los Angeles Lakers, the Phoenix Suns and the Sacramento Kings. All teams, except the Suns, are based in California. Along with the American League West of Major League Baseball (MLB), they are one of two North American major league divisions with no animal themed nicknames.

The division was created at the start of the 1970–71 season, when the league expanded from 14 to 17 teams with the addition of the Buffalo Braves, the Cleveland Cavaliers and the Portland Trail Blazers. The league realigned itself into two conferences: the Western Conference and the Eastern Conference, with two divisions each in each conference. The Pacific Division began with five inaugural members: the Lakers, the Blazers, the San Diego Rockets, the San Francisco Warriors and the Seattle SuperSonics. The Lakers, the Rockets, the Warriors and the SuperSonics all joined from the Western Division.

The Lakers have won the most Pacific Division titles with 25. The Phoenix Suns have the second most titles with eight. 19 NBA champions have come from the Pacific Division. The Lakers have won 12 championships, the Warriors won 5, and the Blazers and Sonics won one championship each. All of them, except the 1976–77 Blazers, the 2001–02 Lakers and the 2021–22 Warriors, were division champions. In the 1991–92 season, six teams from the division qualified for the playoffs. In the 1977–78 season, all teams in the division had winning percentages above 0.500 (50%). The most recent division champions are the Los Angeles Lakers.

Since the 2021–22 season, the Pacific Division champion has received the Chuck Cooper Trophy, named after Hall of Famer Chuck Cooper.

== 2026–27 standings ==
Pacific Division	W	L	PCT	GB	Home	Road	Div	GP
Los Angeles Clippers	1	0	1.000	–	1‍–‍0	0‍–‍0	1–0	1
Los Angeles Lakers	1	0	1.000	–	1‍–‍0	0‍–‍0	1–0	1
Golden State Warriors	0	1	.000	1.0	0‍–‍0	0‍–‍1	0–1	1
Sacramento Kings	0	1	.000	1.0	0‍–‍0	0‍–‍1	0–1	1
Phoenix Suns	0	1	.000	1.0	0‍–‍0	0‍–‍1	0–0	1

== Teams ==
Team	City	Joined	
Team	City	Year	From
Golden State Warriors (1971–present); San Francisco Warriors (1962–1971)	San Francisco, California; Oakland, California	1970	Western Division
Los Angeles Clippers (1984–present); San Diego Clippers (1978–1984)	Inglewood, California; Los Angeles, California; San Diego, California	1978	Atlantic Division (as Buffalo Braves)
Los Angeles Lakers	Los Angeles, California	1969	Western Division
Phoenix Suns	Phoenix, Arizona	1972	Midwest Division
Sacramento Kings	Sacramento, California	1988	Midwest Division

=== Former teams ===
Team	City	Joined		Left		Current division
Team	City	Year	From	Year	To	Current division
Houston Rockets (1971–present); San Diego Rockets (1967–1971)	Houston, Texas; San Diego, California	1970	Western Division	1972	Central Division	Southwest Division
Portland Trail Blazers	Portland, Oregon	1970	—†	2004	Northwest Division	Northwest Division
Seattle SuperSonics (1967–2008, now Oklahoma City Thunder)	Seattle, Washington	1970	Western Division	2004	Northwest Division	Northwest Division

Notes

- † denotes an expansion team.

=== Team timeline ===
Denotes team currently in the division
Denotes team that has left the division

== Chuck Cooper Trophy ==
Beginning with the 2021–22 season, the Pacific Division champion has received the Chuck Cooper Trophy. As with the other division championship trophies, it is named after one of the many African American pioneers from NBA history. Chuck Cooper became the first African-American to be drafted by an NBA team when the Boston Celtics selected him with the first pick in the second round of the 1950 draft. The Cooper Trophy consists of a 200-millimetre (7.9 in) crystal ball.

== Division champions ==
^	Had or tied for the best regular season record for that season

Season	Team	Record	Playoffs result
1970–71	Los Angeles Lakers	48–34 (.585)	Lost conference finals
1971–72	Los Angeles Lakers^	69–13 (.841)	Won NBA Finals
1972–73	Los Angeles Lakers	60–22 (.732)	Lost NBA Finals
1973–74	Los Angeles Lakers	47–35 (.573)	Lost conference semifinals
1974–75	Golden State Warriors	48–34 (.585)	Won NBA Finals
1975–76	Golden State Warriors^	59–23 (.720)	Lost conference finals
1976–77	Los Angeles Lakers^	53–29 (.646)	Lost conference finals
1977–78	Portland Trail Blazers^	58–24 (.707)	Lost conference semifinals
1978–79	Seattle SuperSonics	52–30 (.634)	Won NBA Finals
1979–80	Los Angeles Lakers	60–22 (.732)	Won NBA Finals
1980–81	Phoenix Suns	57–25 (.695)	Lost conference semifinals
1981–82	Los Angeles Lakers	57–25 (.695)	Won NBA Finals
1982–83	Los Angeles Lakers	58–24 (.707)	Lost NBA Finals
1983–84	Los Angeles Lakers	54–28 (.659)	Lost NBA Finals
1984–85	Los Angeles Lakers	62–20 (.756)	Won NBA Finals
1985–86	Los Angeles Lakers	62–20 (.756)	Lost conference finals
1986–87	Los Angeles Lakers^	65–17 (.793)	Won NBA Finals
1987–88	Los Angeles Lakers^	62–20 (.756)	Won NBA Finals
1988–89	Los Angeles Lakers	57–25 (.695)	Lost NBA Finals
1989–90	Los Angeles Lakers^	63–19 (.768)	Lost conference semifinals
1990–91	Portland Trail Blazers^	63–19 (.768)	Lost conference finals
1991–92	Portland Trail Blazers	57–25 (.695)	Lost NBA Finals
1992–93	Phoenix Suns^	62–20 (.756)	Lost NBA Finals
1993–94	Seattle SuperSonics^	63–19 (.768)	Lost first round
1994–95	Phoenix Suns	59–23 (.720)	Lost conference semifinals
1995–96	Seattle SuperSonics	64–18 (.780)	Lost NBA Finals
1996–97	Seattle SuperSonics	57–25 (.695)	Lost conference semifinals
1997–98	Seattle SuperSonics	61–21 (.744)	Lost conference semifinals
1998–99^{[a]}	Portland Trail Blazers	35–15 (.700)	Lost conference finals
1999–00	Los Angeles Lakers^	67–15 (.817)	Won NBA Finals
2000–01	Los Angeles Lakers	56–26 (.683)	Won NBA Finals
2001–02	Sacramento Kings^	61–21 (.744)	Lost conference finals
2002–03	Sacramento Kings	59–23 (.720)	Lost conference semifinals
2003–04	Los Angeles Lakers	56–26 (.683)	Lost NBA Finals
2004–05	Phoenix Suns^	62–20 (.756)	Lost conference finals
2005–06	Phoenix Suns	54–28 (.659)	Lost conference finals
2006–07	Phoenix Suns	61–21 (.744)	Lost conference semifinals
2007–08	Los Angeles Lakers	57–25 (.695)	Lost NBA Finals
2008–09	Los Angeles Lakers	65–17 (.793)	Won NBA Finals
2009–10	Los Angeles Lakers	57–25 (.695)	Won NBA Finals
2010–11	Los Angeles Lakers	57–25 (.695)	Lost conference semifinals
2011–12^{[b]}	Los Angeles Lakers	41–25 (.621)	Lost conference semifinals
2012–13	Los Angeles Clippers	56–26 (.683)	Lost first round
2013–14	Los Angeles Clippers	57–25 (.695)	Lost conference semifinals
2014–15	Golden State Warriors^	67–15 (.817)	Won NBA Finals
2015–16	Golden State Warriors^	73–9 (.890)	Lost NBA Finals
2016–17	Golden State Warriors^	67–15 (.817)	Won NBA Finals
2017–18	Golden State Warriors	58–24 (.707)	Won NBA Finals
2018–19	Golden State Warriors	57–25 (.695)	Lost NBA Finals
2019–20	Los Angeles Lakers	52–19 (.732)	Won NBA Finals
2020–21	Phoenix Suns	51–21 (.708)	Lost NBA Finals
2021–22	Phoenix Suns^	64–18 (.780)	Lost conference semifinals
2022–23	Sacramento Kings	48–34 (.585)	Lost first round
2023–24	Los Angeles Clippers	51–31 (.622)	Lost first round
2024–25	Los Angeles Lakers	50–32 (.610)	Lost first round
2025–26	Los Angeles Lakers	53–29 (.646)	Lost conference semifinals

=== Titles by team ===
^	Denotes team that has left the division

Team	Titles	Season(s) won
Los Angeles Lakers	26	1970–71, 1971–72, 1972–73, 1973–74, 1976–77, 1979–80, 1981–82, 1982–83, 1983–84, 1984–85, 1985–86, 1986–87, 1987–88, 1988–89, 1989–90, 1999–00, 2000–01, 2003–04, 2007–08, 2008–09, 2009–10, 2010–11, 2011–12, 2019–20, 2024–25, 2025–26
Phoenix Suns	8	1980–81, 1992–93, 1994–95, 2004–05, 2005–06, 2006–07, 2020–21, 2021–22
Golden State Warriors	7	1974–75, 1975–76, 2014–15, 2015–16, 2016–17, 2017–18, 2018–19
Seattle SuperSonics^ (now Oklahoma City Thunder)	5	1978–79, 1993–94, 1995–96, 1996–97, 1997–98
Portland Trail Blazers^	4	1977–78, 1990–91, 1991–92, 1998–99
Sacramento Kings	3	2001–02, 2002–03, 2022–23
Los Angeles Clippers	3	2012–13, 2013–14, 2023–24

== Season results ==
^	Denotes team that won the NBA championships
^{+}	Denotes team that won the Conference finals, but lost the NBA Finals
*	Denotes team that qualified for the NBA Playoffs
×	Denotes team that qualified for the NBA play-in tournament

†	Denotes team that did not qualify for the 2020 NBA Bubble season restart

Season	Team (record)						
Season	1st	2nd	3rd	4th	5th	6th	7th
1970: The Pacific Division was formed with five inaugural members. An expansion team, the Portland Trail Blazers, joined the division. The Los Angeles Lakers, the San Diego Rockets, the San Francisco Warriors and the Seattle SuperSonics joined from the Western Division.
1970–71	Los Angeles* (48–34)	San Francisco* (41–41)	San Diego (40–42)	Seattle (38–44)	Portland (29–53)		
1971: The San Diego Rockets had relocated and became the Houston Rockets. The San Francisco Warriors had also relocated to Oakland and became the Golden State Warriors.
1971–72	Los Angeles^ (69–13)	Golden State* (51–31)	Seattle (47–35)	Houston (34–48)	Portland (18–64)		
1972: The Phoenix Suns joined from the Midwest Division. The Houston Rockets left to join the Central Division.
1972–73	Los Angeles^{+} (60–22)	Golden State* (47–35)	Phoenix (38–44)	Seattle (26–56)	Portland (21–61)		
1973–74	Los Angeles* (47–35)	Golden State (44–38)	Seattle (36–46)	Phoenix (30–52)	Portland (27–55)		
1974–75	Golden State^ (48–34)	Seattle* (43–39)	Portland (38–44)	Phoenix (32–50)	Los Angeles (30–52)		
1975–76	Golden State* (59–23)	Seattle* (43–39)	Phoenix^{+} (42–40)	Los Angeles (40–42)	Portland (37–45)		
1976–77	Los Angeles* (53–29)	Portland^ (49–33)	Golden State* (46–36)	Seattle (40–42)	Phoenix (34–48)		
1977–78	Portland* (58–24)	Phoenix* (49–33)	Seattle^{+} (47–35)	Los Angeles* (45–37)	Golden State (43–39)		
1978: The Buffalo Braves, who relocated and became the San Diego Clippers, joined from the Atlantic Division.
1978–79	Seattle^ (52–30)	Phoenix* (50–32)	Los Angeles* (47–35)	Portland* (45–37)	San Diego (43–39)	Golden State (38–44)	
1979–80	Los Angeles^ (60–22)	Seattle* (56–26)	Phoenix* (55–27)	Portland* (38–44)	San Diego (35–47)	Golden State (24–58)	
1980–81	Phoenix* (57–25)	Los Angeles* (54–28)	Portland* (45–37)	Golden State (39–43)	San Diego (36–46)	Seattle (34–48)	
1981–82	Los Angeles^ (57–25)	Seattle* (52–30)	Phoenix* (46–36)	Golden State (45–37)	Portland (42–40)	San Diego (17–65)	
1982–83	Los Angeles^{+} (58–24)	Phoenix* (53–29)	Seattle* (48–34)	Portland* (46–36)	Golden State (30–52)	San Diego (25–57)	
1983–84	Los Angeles^{+} (54–28)	Portland* (48–34)	Seattle* (42–40)	Phoenix* (41–41)	Golden State (37–45)	San Diego (30–52)	
1984: The San Diego Clippers relocated and became the Los Angeles Clippers.
1984–85	L.A. Lakers^ (62–20)	Portland* (42–40)	Phoenix* (36–46)	Seattle (31–51)	L.A. Clippers (31–51)	Golden State (22–60)	
1985–86	L.A. Lakers* (62–20)	Portland* (40–42)	Phoenix (32–50)	L.A. Clippers (32–50)	Seattle (31–51)	Golden State (30–52)	
1986–87	L.A. Lakers^ (65–17)	Portland* (49–33)	Golden State* (42–40)	Seattle* (39–43)	Phoenix (36–46)	L.A. Clippers (12–70)	
1987–88	L.A. Lakers^ (62–20)	Portland* (53–29)	Seattle* (44–38)	Phoenix (28–54)	Golden State (20–62)	L.A. Clippers (17–65)	
1988: The Sacramento Kings joined from the Midwest Division.
1988–89	L.A. Lakers^{+} (57–25)	Phoenix* (55–27)	Seattle* (47–35)	Golden State* (43–39)	Portland* (39–43)	Sacramento (27–55)	L.A. Clippers (21–61)
1989–90	L.A. Lakers* (63–19)	Portland^{+} (59–23)	Phoenix* (54–28)	Seattle (41–41)	Golden State (37–45)	L.A. Clippers (30–52)	Sacramento (23–59)
1990–91	Portland* (63–19)	L.A. Lakers^{+} (58–24)	Phoenix* (55–27)	Golden State* (44–38)	Seattle* (41–41)	L.A. Clippers (31–51)	Sacramento (25–57)
1991–92	Portland^{+} (57–25)	Golden State* (55–27)	Phoenix* (53–29)	Seattle* (47–35)	L.A. Clippers* (45–37)	L.A. Lakers* (43–39)	Sacramento (29–53)
1992–93	Phoenix^{+} (62–20)	Seattle* (55–27)	Portland* (51–31)	L.A. Clippers* (41–41)	L.A. Lakers* (39–43)	Golden State (34–48)	Sacramento (25–57)
1993–94	Seattle* (63–19)	Phoenix* (56–26)	Golden State* (50–32)	Portland* (47–35)	L.A. Lakers (33–49)	Sacramento (28–54)	L.A. Clippers (27–55)
1994–95	Phoenix* (59–23)	Seattle* (57–25)	L.A. Lakers* (48–34)	Portland* (44–38)	Sacramento (39–43)	Golden State (26–56)	L.A. Clippers (17–65)
1995–96	Seattle^{+} (64–18)	L.A. Lakers* (53–29)	Portland* (44–38)	Phoenix* (41–41)	Sacramento* (39–43)	Golden State (36–46)	L.A. Clippers (29–53)
1996–97	Seattle* (57–25)	L.A. Lakers* (56–26)	Portland* (49–33)	Phoenix* (40–42)	L.A. Clippers* (36–46)	Sacramento (34–48)	Golden State (30–52)
1997–98	Seattle* (61–21)	L.A. Lakers* (61–21)	Phoenix* (56–26)	Portland* (46–36)	Sacramento (27–55)	Golden State (19–63)	L.A. Clippers (17–65)
1998–99^{[a]}	Portland* (35–15)	L.A. Lakers* (31–19)	Phoenix* (27–23)	Sacramento* (27–23)	Seattle (25–25)	Golden State (21–29)	L.A. Clippers (9–41)
1999–00	L.A. Lakers^ (67–15)	Portland* (59–23)	Phoenix* (53–29)	Seattle* (45–37)	Sacramento* (44–38)	Golden State (19–63)	L.A. Clippers (15–67)
2000–01	L.A. Lakers^ (56–26)	Sacramento* (55–27)	Phoenix* (51–31)	Portland* (50–32)	Seattle (44–38)	L.A. Clippers (31–51)	Golden State (17–65)
2001–02	Sacramento* (61–21)	L.A. Lakers^ (58–24)	Portland* (49–33)	Seattle* (45–37)	L.A. Clippers (39–43)	Phoenix (36–46)	Golden State (21–61)
2002–03	Sacramento* (59–23)	L.A. Lakers* (50–32)	Portland* (50–32)	Phoenix* (44–38)	Seattle (40–42)	Golden State (38–44)	L.A. Clippers (27–55)
2003–04	L.A. Lakers^{+} (56–26)	Sacramento* (55–27)	Portland (41–41)	Golden State (37–45)	Seattle (37–45)	Phoenix (29–53)	L.A. Clippers (28–54)
2004: The Portland Trail Blazers and the Seattle SuperSonics left to join the Northwest Division.
2004–05	Phoenix* (62–20)	Sacramento* (50–32)	L.A. Clippers (37–45)	L.A. Lakers (34–48)	Golden State (34–48)		
2005–06	Phoenix* (54–28)	L.A. Clippers* (47–35)	L.A. Lakers* (45–37)	Sacramento* (44–38)	Golden State (34–48)		
2006–07	Phoenix* (61–21)	L.A. Lakers* (42–40)	Golden State* (42–40)	L.A. Clippers (40–42)	Sacramento (33–49)		
2007–08	L.A. Lakers^{+} (57–25)	Phoenix* (55–27)	Golden State (48–34)	Sacramento (38–44)	L.A. Clippers (23–59)		
2008–09	L.A. Lakers^ (65–17)	Phoenix (46–36)	Golden State (29–53)	L.A. Clippers (19–63)	Sacramento (17–65)		
2009–10	L.A. Lakers^ (57–25)	Phoenix* (54–28)	L.A. Clippers (29–53)	Golden State (26–56)	Sacramento (25–57)		
2010–11	L.A. Lakers* (57–25)	Phoenix (40–42)	Golden State (36–46)	L.A. Clippers (32–50)	Sacramento (24–58)		
2011–12^{[b]}	L.A. Lakers* (41–25)	L.A. Clippers* (40–26)	Phoenix (33–33)	Golden State (23–43)	Sacramento (22–44)		
2012–13	L.A. Clippers* (56–26)	Golden State* (47–35)	L.A. Lakers* (45–37)	Sacramento (28–54)	Phoenix (25–57)		
2013–14	L.A. Clippers* (57–25)	Golden State* (51–31)	Phoenix (48–34)	Sacramento (28–54)	L.A. Lakers (27–57)		
2014–15	Golden State^ (67–15)	L.A. Clippers* (56–26)	Phoenix (39–43)	Sacramento (29–53)	L.A. Lakers (21–61)		
2015–16	Golden State^{+} (73–9)	L.A. Clippers* (53–29)	Sacramento (33–49)	Phoenix (23–59)	L.A. Lakers (17–65)		
2016–17	Golden State^ (67–15)	L.A. Clippers* (51–31)	Sacramento (32–50)	L.A. Lakers (26–56)	Phoenix (24–58)		
2017–18	Golden State^ (58–24)	L.A. Clippers (42–40)	L.A. Lakers (35–47)	Sacramento (27–55)	Phoenix (21–61)		
2018–19	Golden State^{+} (57–25)	L.A. Clippers* (48–34)	Sacramento (39–43)	L.A. Lakers (37–45)	Phoenix (19–63)		
2019–20	L.A. Lakers^ (52–19)	L.A. Clippers* (49–23)	Phoenix (34–39)	Sacramento (31–41)	Golden State† (15–50)		
2020–21	Phoenix^{+} (51–21)	L.A. Clippers* (47–25)	L.A. Lakers* (42–30)	Golden State× (39–33)	Sacramento (31–41)		
2021–22	Phoenix* (64–18)	Golden State^ (53–29)	L.A. Clippers× (42–40)	L.A. Lakers (33–49)	Sacramento (30–52)		
2022–23	Sacramento* (48–34)	Phoenix* (45–37)	L.A. Clippers* (44–38)	Golden State* (44–38)	L.A. Lakers* (43–39)		
2023–24	L.A. Clippers* (51–31)	Phoenix* (49–33)	L.A. Lakers* (47–35)	Sacramento× (46–36)	Golden State× (46–36)		
2024–25	L.A. Lakers* (50–32)	L.A. Clippers* (50–32)	Golden State* (48–34)	Sacramento× (40–42)	Phoenix (36–46)		
2025–26	L.A. Lakers* (53–29)	Phoenix* (45–37)	L.A. Clippers× (42–40)	Golden State× (37–45)	Sacramento (22–60)		

== Rivalries ==
Los Angeles Lakers vs. Los Angeles Clippers

Phoenix Suns vs. Los Angeles Lakers

Los Angeles Lakers vs. Golden State Warriors

Sacramento Kings vs. Los Angeles Lakers

Sacramento Kings vs. Golden State Warriors

I-5 rivalry/Portland Trail Blazers vs. Seattle SuperSonics

== Notes ==
- ^{a 1} ^{2} Because of a lockout, the season did not start until February 5, 1999, and all 29 teams played a shortened 50-game regular season schedule.
- ^{b 1} ^{2} Because of a lockout, the season did not start until December 25, 2011, and all 30 teams played a shortened 66-game regular season schedule.

== See also ==
- Atlantic Division (NBA)
- Central Division (NBA)
- Southwest Division (NBA)
- Midwest Division (NBA)
