= UPMC Cooper Fieldhouse =

Indoor arena in Pittsburgh, Pennsylvania

- Interactive map of UPMC Cooper Fieldhouse
- Former names: A.J. Palumbo Center (1988–2021)
- Location: 600 Forbes Avenue; Pittsburgh, Pennsylvania 15282
- Coordinates: 40.4374°N 79.9879°W
- Owner: Duquesne University
- Operator: Duquesne University
- Capacity: 3,500
- Surface: Hardwood

Construction
- Opened: 1988
- Renovated: 2006; 2010–2011; 2019–2021
- Architect: DRS Architects

Tenants
- Duquesne Dukes (NCAA) (1988–present); Pittsburgh Piranhas (CBA) (1994–1995)

UPMC Cooper Fieldhouse is a 3,500-seat multipurpose arena on the campus of Duquesne University in Pittsburgh, Pennsylvania. Originally opened in 1988 as the A.J. Palumbo Center, it is the home venue of the men's and women's basketball teams and the university's women's volleyball program. Following a major renovation from 2019 to 2021, the arena was renamed for Duquesne alumnus and Basketball Hall of Famer Chuck Cooper, the first African American selected in an NBA draft.

== History ==
=== A.J. Palumbo Center ===
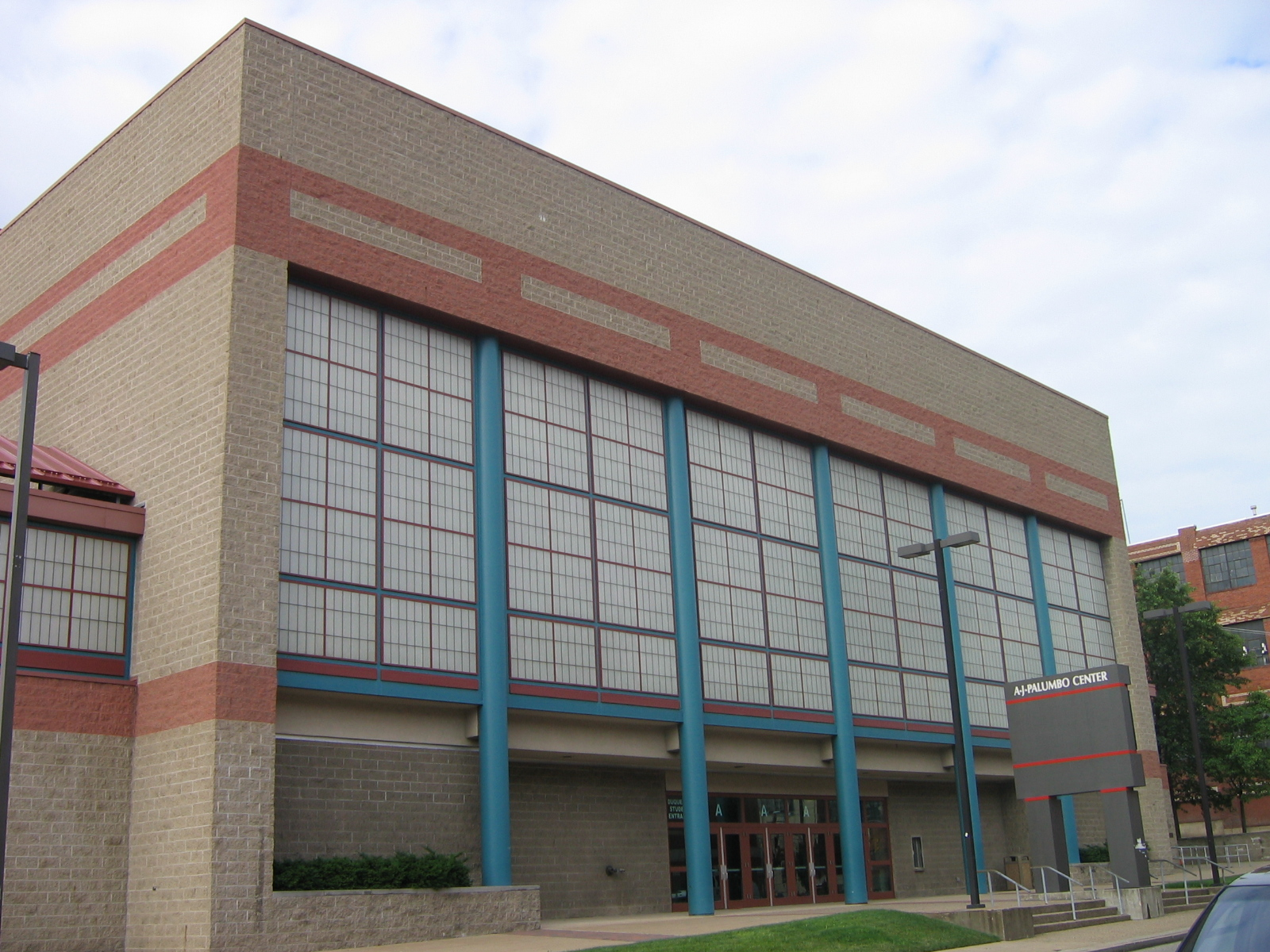
The arena as the A.J. Palumbo Center in 2008, before its 2019–2021 renovation

Construction of the A.J. Palumbo Center began in 1986, and the arena opened in 1988. It was named for businessman and Duquesne benefactor Antonio J. Palumbo. The arena gave the university an on-campus home for its basketball programs, which had previously played extensively at the Pittsburgh Civic Arena and other venues around the city.

Duquesne undertook a $2 million renovation of the Palumbo Center in 2006, adding new basketball offices, training and conditioning areas, a recruiting suite, and video facilities. A second phase completed in 2010 added chairback seating and new video and scoreboard systems, reducing basketball capacity from 5,358 to 4,406. Locker rooms for men's and women's basketball and volleyball were subsequently renovated as the Janice and James Schaming Athletic Center.

=== UPMC Cooper Fieldhouse ===
In October 2018, Duquesne announced a $45 million renovation and expansion of the Palumbo Center. The project began in March 2019 and included a new exterior façade, wider concourses, premium seating, practice facilities, and expanded athletic training and academic-support spaces. The interior of the existing arena was extensively rebuilt while retaining portions of the original structure.

The renovated facility opened on February 2, 2021, after a 22-month project. Its first event was a men's basketball game against Dayton, which Duquesne won 69–64.

The new name recognizes Chuck Cooper, who played for Duquesne from 1947 to 1950 before becoming the first African American selected in the NBA draft. The A.J. Palumbo name was retained for the arena's main atrium.

== Facilities ==
The fieldhouse has 3,500 permanent seats, with standing areas allowing attendance of more than 4,200. It contains six suites, 55 club-level seats, two high-definition video boards, and four lower-level ribbon boards.

The facility also houses the Folino Sports Performance Center, which contains approximately 10,000 sq ft (930 m^{2}) of training, performance, and nutrition space, and the Joe and Kathy Guyaux Player Development Center, which contains two regulation-size practice basketball courts. Other spaces include the Gilliand Pavilion, the Duquesne Sports Hall of Fame, and academic-support facilities for student-athletes.

== Sports ==
UPMC Cooper Fieldhouse is the home arena for Duquesne men's and women's basketball and women's volleyball. The men's basketball team played its first game in the original Palumbo Center on December 3, 1988, defeating Saint Joseph's 73–69.

The arena was also home to the Pittsburgh Piranhas of the Continental Basketball Association during the 1994–95 season. The Piranhas reached the CBA championship series before losing to the Yakima Sun Kings.

While the Cooper Fieldhouse renovation was underway, Duquesne played home games at the UPMC Events Center at Robert Morris University, PPG Paints Arena, and the Kerr Fitness Center at La Roche University.

== Other events ==
During the Palumbo Center era, the arena was also used for concerts and other university and public events. It became a prominent mid-sized Pittsburgh concert venue during the late 1980s and 1990s and hosted performers including Tom Petty, Stevie Wonder, and Elvis Costello.

== See also ==
- List of NCAA Division I basketball arenas
