= Billy Joe Adcock =

American basketball player

Personal information
- Born: March 26, 1928 Evansville, Indiana, U.S.
- Died: July 29, 2022 (aged 94) Kirkwood, Missouri, U.S.
- Listed height: 6 ft 2 in (1.88 m)

Career information
- High school: West (Nashville, Tennessee)
- College: Vanderbilt (1947–1950)
- NBA draft: 1950: 8th round, 88th overall pick
- Drafted by: Fort Wayne Pistons
- Position: Forward / guard

Career highlights
- 2× First-team All-SEC (1948, 1950); 2× AP Honorable mention All-American (1948, 1950)
- Stats at Basketball Reference

Billy Joe Adcock (March 26, 1928 – July 29, 2022) was a basketball player for the Vanderbilt Commodores.

Adcock was born in Evansville, Indiana, but his family soon moved to Jackson, Tennessee.

A prominent forward, he was the first player to be awarded a basketball scholarship by the school. He was also the school's first All-American basketball selection, by the Sporting News in 1950. Adcock retired as Vanderbilt's all-time leading scorer. He attended West High School in Nashville, where he was a three-year letterman in football and baseball as well as basketball.

He graduated with a degree in civil engineering. He was drafted by the Fort Wayne Pistons in the 1950 draft but elected to work with the Monsanto Chemical Company, where he worked for 36 years, where he retired as a director of national sales for the company.

For his play as a player, he was inducted into the Tennessee Sports Hall of Fame in 2002 and the Vanderbilt Athletics Hall of Fame in 2013. He died at the age of 94 on July 29, 2022; he was survived by his wife and three children.
