= Kevin O'Shea (basketball) =

American basketball player (1925–2003)

Personal information
- Born: July 10, 1925 San Francisco, California, U.S.
- Died: February 21, 2003 (aged 77) Sonoma County, California, U.S.
- Listed height: 6 ft 2 in (1.88 m)
- Listed weight: 175 lb (79 kg)

Career information
- High school: St. Ignatius (San Francisco, California)
- College: Notre Dame (1946–1950)
- NBA draft: 1950: 1st round, 10th overall pick
- Drafted by: Minneapolis Lakers
- Playing career: 1950–1953
- Position: Shooting guard / point guard
- Number: 15, 14, 33, 7

Career history
- 1950–1951: Minneapolis Lakers
- 1951–1952: Milwaukee Hawks
- 1952–1953: Baltimore Bullets
- 1953: Wilkes-Barre Barons

Career highlights
- Consensus first-team All-American (1948); Consensus second-team All-American (1950); Third-team All-American – AP (1949); California Mr. Basketball (1943)

Career NBA statistics
- Points: 911 (5.2 ppg)
- Rebounds: 402 (2.3 rpg)
- Assists: 358 (2.1 apg)
- Stats at NBA.com
- Stats at Basketball Reference

Kevin Christopher O'Shea (July 10, 1925 – February 21, 2003) was an All-American college basketball player who later played professionally. He was born in San Francisco, California.

A 6'2" guard from the University of Notre Dame, O'Shea was selected by the Minneapolis Lakers with the tenth pick of the 1950 NBA draft. He played three seasons in the NBA with the Lakers, Milwaukee Hawks, and Baltimore Bullets, averaging 5.2 points per game.

== Career statistics ==
Legend
GP	Games played	GS	Games started	MPG	Minutes per game
FG%	Field goal percentage	3P%	3-point field goal percentage	FT%	Free throw percentage
RPG	Rebounds per game	APG	Assists per game	SPG	Steals per game
BPG	Blocks per game	PPG	Points per game	**Bold**	Career high

=== NBA ===
==== Regular season ====
Year	Team	GP	MPG	FG%	FT%	RPG	APG	PPG
1950–51	Minneapolis	**63**	–	.326	**.724**	2.0	1.6	4.3
1951–52	Milwaukee	43	25.0	.306	.655	2.8	2.3	6.0
1951–52	Baltimore	22	**29.5**	.370	.722	**3.6**	**3.2**	**8.7**
1952–53	Baltimore	46	14.0	**.376**	.593	1.7	1.9	4.1
Career		174	21.3	.337	.680	2.3	2.1	5.2

==== Playoffs ====
Year	Team	GP	MPG	FG%	FT%	RPG	APG	PPG
1951	Minneapolis	5	–	.143	.750	1.0	.2	1.0
