= 1951–52 Milwaukee Hawks season =

NBA professional basketball team season

- Head coach: Doxie Moore
- Arena: Milwaukee Arena

Results
- Record: 17–49 (.258)
- Place: Division: 5th (Western)
- Playoff finish: Did not qualify
- Stats at Basketball Reference

The 1951–52 Milwaukee Hawks season was the Hawks' sixth season of existence, their third season in the NBA, and first season in Milwaukee as the Hawks after previously going by the Tri-Cities Blackhawks for most of their existence up until this point in time.

== Regular season ==
=== Season standings ===
| Western Division | W | L | PCT | GB | Home | Road | Neutral | Div |
|---|---|---|---|---|---|---|---|---|
| x-Rochester Royals | 41 | 25 | .621 | – | 28–5 | 12–18 | 1–2 | 22–14 |
| x-Minneapolis Lakers | 40 | 26 | .606 | 1 | 21–5 | 13–20 | 6–1 | 24–12 |
| x-Indianapolis Olympians | 34 | 32 | .515 | 7 | 25–6 | 4–24 | 5–2 | 18–18 |
| x-Fort Wayne Pistons | 29 | 37 | .439 | 12 | 22–11 | 6–24 | 1–2 | 17–19 |
| Milwaukee Hawks | 17 | 49 | .258 | 24 | 8–13 | 3–22 | 6–14 | 9–27 |

x – clinched playoff spot

=== Game log ===
1950–51 Game log
| # | Date | Opponent | Score | High points | Record |
| 1 | November 3 | New York | 68–66 | Elmer Behnke (14) | 0–1 |
| 2 | November 6 | Fort Wayne | 62–65 (OT) | Dwight Eddleman (17) | 1–1 |
| 3 | November 11 | @ Fort Wayne | 59–74 | Dwight Eddleman (12) | 1–2 |
| 4 | November 13 | Rochester | 91–75 | Dwight Eddleman (20) | 1–3 |
| 5 | November 16 | @ Indianapolis | 78–68 | Boven, Eddleman (18) | 2–3 |
| 6 | November 17 | N Indianapolis | 58–68 | Kevin O'Shea (14) | 2–4 |
| 7 | November 19 | @ Baltimore | 70–71 | Dwight Eddleman (15) | 2–5 |
| 8 | November 20 | @ Philadelphia | 64–80 | Dwight Eddleman (18) | 2–6 |
| 9 | November 22 | @ Boston | 72–103 | Dwight Eddleman (19) | 2–7 |
| 10 | November 24 | Minneapolis | 72–59 | Dwight Eddleman (15) | 2–8 |
| 11 | November 25 | Rochester | 73–75 | Mel Hutchins (16) | 3–8 |
| 12 | November 27 | @ Rochester | 73–77 | Dwight Eddleman (31) | 3–9 |
| 13 | November 29 | N Baltimore | 64–77 | Dwight Eddleman (24) | 3–10 |
| 14 | December 1 | @ Rochester | 66–71 | Dwight Eddleman (15) | 3–11 |
| 15 | December 2 | Indianapolis | 80–71 | Dwight Eddleman (19) | 3–12 |
| 16 | December 6 | N Syracuse | 70–73 | Dick Mehen (17) | 4–12 |
| 17 | December 8 | Fort Wayne | 71–82 | Dwight Eddleman (27) | 5–12 |
| 18 | December 9 | Baltimore | 73–71 | Don Rehfeldt (15) | 5–13 |
| 19 | December 11 | @ New York | 83–88 | Dick Mehen (26) | 5–14 |
| 20 | December 12 | @ Boston | 84–89 | Dick Mehen (15) | 5–15 |
| 21 | December 13 | @ Syracuse | 82–89 | Don Otten (21) | 5–16 |
| 22 | December 16 | @ Minneapolis | 52–99 | Dwight Eddleman (18) | 5–17 |
| 23 | December 18 | Rochester | 94–68 | Dwight Eddleman (14) | 5–18 |
| 24 | December 21 | @ Indianapolis | 64–69 | Dwight Eddleman (17) | 5–19 |
| 25 | December 25 | N Syracuse | 70–65 | Don Rehfeldt (15) | 5–20 |
| 26 | December 26 | N New York | 76–78 | Don Boven (19) | 6–20 |
| 27 | December 27 | @ Syracuse | 69–68 | Mel Hutchins (15) | 7–20 |
| 28 | December 29 | Philadelphia | 68–61 | Don Otten (22) | 7–21 |
| 29 | December 30 | at Fort Wayne | 60–77 | Eddleman, Hutchins (12) | 7–22 |
| 30 | January 1 | New York | 68–65 | Boven, Rehfeldt (16) | 7–23 |
| 31 | January 2 | N New York | 89–67 | Dwight Eddleman (18) | 7–24 |
| 32 | January 8 | Boston | 83–76 | Dick Mehen (19) | 7–25 |
| 33 | January 11 | Minneapolis | 75–63 | Dwight Eddleman (17) | 7–26 |
| 34 | January 12 | N Minneapolis | 96–84 | Dan Boven (18) | 7–27 |
| 35 | January 15 | Fort Wayne | 63–76 | Dwight Eddleman (22) | 8–27 |
| 36 | January 16 | N Baltimore | 77–71 | Dwight Eddleman (18) | 9–27 |
| 37 | January 17 | N Baltimore | 87–76 | Dick Mehen (17) | 10–27 |
| 38 | January 20 | @ Fort Wayne | 76–83 | Don Otten (23) | 10–28 |
| 39 | January 21 | N Rochester | 78–76 | Boven, Otten (18) | 10–29 |
| 40 | January 22 | Syracuse | 93–82 | Dwight Eddleman (16) | 10–30 |
| 41 | January 26 | Minneapolis | 57–56 | Don Otten (18) | 10–31 |
| 42 | January 27 | @ Minneapolis | 62–91 | Dick Mehen (19) | 10–32 |
| 43 | January 31 | @ Syracuse | 79–88 | Don Otten (26) | 10–33 |
| 44 | February 1 | N Boston | 77–100 | Bob Wilson (16) | 10–34 |
| 45 | February 22 | @ Rochester | 79–100 | Dillard Crocker (17) | 10–35 |
| 46 | February 3 | Philadelphia | 73–83 | Dick Mehen (21) | 11–35 |
| 47 | February 5 | @ Fort Wayne | 75–64 | Don Otten (24) | 12–35 |
| 48 | February 8 | @ Indianapolis | 76–80 | Don Otten (28) | 12–36 |
| 49 | February 9 | Indianapolis | 83–90 | Don Otten (27) | 13–36 |
| 50 | February 10 | Minneapolis | 69–70 (2OT) | Don Boven (16) | 14–36 |
| 51 | February 14 | N Minneapolis | 109–74 | Don Otten (16) | 14–37 |
| 52 | February 17 | N Boston | 97–95 | Don Boven (28) | 15–37 |
| 53 | February 18 | N Boston | 84–106 | Dick Mehen (19) | 15–38 |
| 54 | February 20 | N Indianapolis | 80–95 | Don Boven (18) | 15–39 |
| 55 | February 22 | @ Indianapolis | 73–82 | Dick Mehen (15) | 15–40 |
| 56 | February 23 | N Indianapolis | 59–86 | Don Otten (14) | 15–41 |
| 57 | February 24 | N Philadelphia | 76–71 | Don Boven (19) | 15–42 |
| 58 | February 26 | @ Rochester | 67–99 | Don Boven (17) | 15–43 |
| 59 | March 1 | N Fort Wayne | 58–66 | Don Boven (16) | 15–44 |
| 60 | March 2 | Minneapolis | 96–85 | Hutchins, Mehen (20) | 15–45 |
| 61 | March 6 | @ Rochester | 74–77 | Dillard Crocker (23) | 15–46 |
| 62 | March 7 | Fort Wayne | 74–75 | Don Otten (27) | 16–46 |
| 63 | March 8 | N New York | 99–103 | Don Otten (27) | 17–46 |
| 64 | March 10 | @ Baltimore | 80–91 | Don Otten (26) | 17–47 |
| 65 | March 14 | @ Philadelphia | 82–85 | Nate DeLong (19) | 17–48 |
| 66 | March 15 | N Philadelphia | 105–86 | Dillard Crocker (19) | 17–49 |

== See also ==
- 1951–52 NBA season
