= 1950–51 Baltimore Bullets season =

- Head coach: Buddy Jeannette (14–23); Walt Budko (10–19)
- Arena: Baltimore Coliseum

Results
- Record: 24–42 (.364)
- Place: Division: 5th (Eastern)
- Playoff finish: Did not qualify
- Stats at Basketball Reference

Local media
- Television: WAAM
- Radio: WITH

The 1950–51 Baltimore Bullets season was the Bullets' 4th season in the NBA and seventh overall season of existence. One lesser known aspect involved with this season related to the Bullets involved the fact that they won a game that was failed to be rigged by NBA referee Sol Levy on November 15, 1950 against the Philadelphia Warriors, who later was arrested as an accomplice in the CCNY point-shaving scandal of 1951 following five more attempts at rigging NBA games with mixed results. This season was also notable for having the first official NBA player to be permanently banned from the NBA by the end of the season, as rookie Norm Mager would end up being caught as a part of the aforementioned CCNY point-shaving scandal while he was playing for the Bullets out in Baltimore during this season. One other lesser known fact about this season is that the Bullets were the very last NBA team to ever lose to the Washington Capitols before they ended up folding operations on January 9, 1951; following a 83–71 victory Baltimore had against Washington in their home arena on New Year's Day of 1951, the Bullets would end up losing against the Capitols in Washington 92–82 two days later on January 3, officially marking their tenth win of the season and the final victory the Washington Capitols franchise would ever have in the NBA.

== Draft picks ==
Round	Pick	Player	Position	Nationality	College
1	2	Don Rehfeldt	F	United States	Wisconsin
2	13	John Pilch	F	United States	Wyoming
3	25	Dick Dickey	G	United States	North Carolina State
5	49	Norm Mager	F	United States	CCNY

== Roster ==
1950–51 Baltimore Bullets roster
Players

Pos.	No.	Player	Height	Weight	DOB	From
Pos.	#	Name	Ht.	Wt.	From
PF	12	Walt Budko	6 ft 5 in (1.96 m)	220 lb (100 kg)		Columbia
G/F	5	Tommy Byrnes	6 ft 3 in (1.91 m)	175 lb (79 kg)		Seton Hall
G/F		Don Carlson	6 ft 0 in (1.83 m)	170 lb (77 kg)		Minnesota
G		Ray Corley	6 ft 0 in (1.83 m)	180 lb (82 kg)		Georgetown
G	4	Joe Dolhon	6 ft 0 in (1.83 m)	175 lb (79 kg)		NYU
C	13	Chick Halbert	6 ft 9 in (2.06 m)	225 lb (102 kg)		West Texas A&M
G	8	Billy Hassett	5 ft 11 in (1.80 m)	180 lb (82 kg)		Notre Dame
G/F	11	Paul Hoffman	6 ft 2 in (1.88 m)	195 lb (88 kg)		Purdue
F	5	Gene James	6 ft 4 in (1.93 m)	180 lb (82 kg)		Marshall
F	33	Norm Mager	6 ft 5 in (1.96 m)	185 lb (84 kg)		CCNY
PF	7	Dick Mehen	6 ft 5 in (1.96 m)	195 lb (88 kg)		Tennessee
SG	9	Ken Murray	6 ft 2 in (1.88 m)	190 lb (86 kg)		St. Bonaventure
G		Tommy O'Keefe	6 ft 2 in (1.88 m)	185 lb (84 kg)		Georgetown
C	13	Don Otten	6 ft 10 in (2.08 m)	240 lb (109 kg)		Bowling Green
SF		Don Rehfeldt	6 ft 7 in (2.01 m)	210 lb (95 kg)		Wisconsin
C	6	Red Rocha	6 ft 9 in (2.06 m)	185 lb (84 kg)		Oregon State
G	4	Ken Sailors	5 ft 10 in (1.78 m)	175 lb (79 kg)		Wyoming
SG	8	Belus Smawley	6 ft 1 in (1.85 m)	195 lb (88 kg)		Appalachian State
PF	7	Brady Walker	6 ft 6 in (1.98 m)	205 lb (93 kg)		BYU

Coaches
Head coach
- Buddy Jeannette
  Walt Budko

Legend
- (DP) Unsigned draft pick
- (FA) Free agent
- (S) Suspended
- Injured

== Regular season ==
=== Season standings ===
Eastern Division	W	L	PCT	GB	Home	Road	Neutral	Div
x-Philadelphia Warriors	40	26	.606	–	28–4	11–21	1–1	22–14
x-Boston Celtics	39	30	.565	1	25–5	10–23	4–2	21–19
x-New York Knicks	36	30	.545	4	22–5	10–25	4–0	21–15
x-Syracuse Nationals	32	34	.485	8	23–10	9–24	–	19–17
Baltimore Bullets	24	42	.364	16	20–12	4–24	0–6	12–24
Washington Capitols†	10	25	.286	30	7–12	3–12	0–1	6–12

=== Game log ===
1950–51 Game log
#	Date	Opponent	Score	High points	Record
1	November 1	Minneapolis	81–71	Paul Hoffman (15)	1–0
2	November 4	Indianapolis	102–86	Dick Mehen (20)	2–0
3	November 7	vs Boston	64–83	Ken Murray (22)	2–1
4	November 8	at Washington	81–86	Don Rehfeldt (23)	2–2
5	November 11	Fort Wayne	85–77	Mehen, Murray (16)	3–2
6	November 12	at Syracuse	57–83	Ken Murray (16)	3–3
7	November 14	at Philadelphia	72–84	Dick Mehen (18)	3–4
8	November 15	Philadelphia	80–72	Ken Murray (19)	4–4
9	November 16	at Boston	73–82	Ken Murray (22)	4–5
10	November 18	Boston	76–80	Dick Mehen (15)	4–6
11	November 19	at Fort Wayne	80–84	Red Rocha (14)	4–7
12	November 21	vs Tri-Cities	65–76	Walt Budko (13)	4–8
13	November 22	New York	73–87	Red Rocha (21)	4–9
14	November 25	at Indianapolis	81–92	Ken Murray (25)	4–10
15	November 26	at Minneapolis	71–85	Ken Murray (20)	4–11
16	November 28	at Tri-Cities	73–65	Walt Budko (20)	5–11
17	December 2	Syracuse	96–99 (OT)	Red Rocha (21)	5–12
18	December 3	at Boston	85–97	Brady Walker (17)	5–13
19	December 6	Rochester	70–74	Rocha, Sailors (14)	5–14
20	December 9	Philadelphia	76–75	Walt Budko (21)	6–14
21	December 10	at Syracuse	86–76	Red Rocha (18)	7–14
22	December 12	at Rochester	87–102	Red Rocha (21)	7–15
23	December 13	Tri-Cities	83–55	Ken Murray (22)	8–15
24	December 16	Boston	119–88	Belus Smawley (28)	9–15
25	December 20	Minneapolis	91–84	Belus Smawley (18)	10–15
26	December 25	at Tri-Cities	72–87	Ken Murray (18)	10–16
27	December 27	at Minneapolis	63–81	Red Rocha (11)	10–17
28	December 30	Syracuse	80–90 (OT)	Ken Murray (21)	10–18
29	January 1	Washington	83–71	Hoffman, Murray, Rocha (15)	11–18
30	January 3	at Washington	82–92	Walt Budko (14)	11–19
31	January 4	at Philadelphia	69–92	Brady Walker (14)	11–20
32	January 6	Philadelphia	64–57	Walt Budko (18)	12–20
33	January 7	at Syracuse	65–73	Walt Budko (16)	12–21
34	January 10	Rochester	78–80 (OT)	Ken Murray (23)	12–22
35	January 13	at New York	79–92	Belus Smawley (23)	12–23
36	January 14	New York	93–91 (2OT)	Belus Smawley (30)	13–23
37	January 17	Tri-Cities	81–70	Red Rocha (17)	14–23
38	January 20	Indianapolis	102–63	Red Rocha (20)	15–23
39	January 23	vs Minneapolis	79–89	Ken Murray (15)	15–24
40	January 24	Syracuse	87–82	Ken Murray (19)	16–24
41	January 27	Fort Wayne	97–91	Red Rocha (26)	17–24
42	January 30	at Rochester	90–95	Belus Smawley (19)	17–25
43	January 31	at New York	77–89	Red Rocha (14)	17–26
44	February 3	New York	72–83	Ken Murray (22)	17–27
45	February 4	at Fort Wayne	108–95	Paul Hoffman (20)	18–27
46	February 6	vs New York	82–91	Ken Murray (19)	18–28
47	February 7	Syracuse	102–82	Murray, Smawley (20)	19–28
48	February 8	at Philadelphia	75–86	Red Rocha (21)	19–29
49	February 10	Boston	81–76	Sailors, Smawley (22)	20–29
50	February 11	at Syracuse	72–80	Red Rocha (17)	20–30
51	February 14	at Minneapolis	71–99	Paul Hoffman (14)	20–31
52	February 15	vs Indianapolis	60–69	Red Rocha (15)	20–32
53	February 17	Fort Wayne	112–91	Hoffman, Smawley (19)	21–32
54	February 20	at Rochester	89–105	Belus Smawley (21)	21–33
55	February 21	Philadelphia	81–83	Belus Smawley (18)	21–34
56	February 22	vs Boston	69–72	Hoffman, Rocha (14)	21–35
57	February 24	Boston	84–75	Red Rocha (17)	22–35
58	February 25	at Fort Wayne	92–102	Don Rehfeldt (16)	22–36
59	February 27	at Indianapolis	74–96	Don Rehfeldt (21)	22–37
60	February 28	at Tri-Cities	85–100	Ken Sailors (20)	22–38
61	March 3	Boston	87–95	Ken Sailors (19)	22–39
62	March 7	Philadelphia	84–95	Belus Smawley (15)	22–40
63	March 8	at Philadelphia	90–94 (2OT)	Belus Smawley (23)	22–41
64	March 11	New York	112–89	Belus Smawley (23)	23–41
65	March 15	Rochester	93–87	Brady Walker (19)	24–41
66	March 17	Indianapolis	91–92	Belus Smawley (21)	24–42
