= John Pilch =

American basketball player

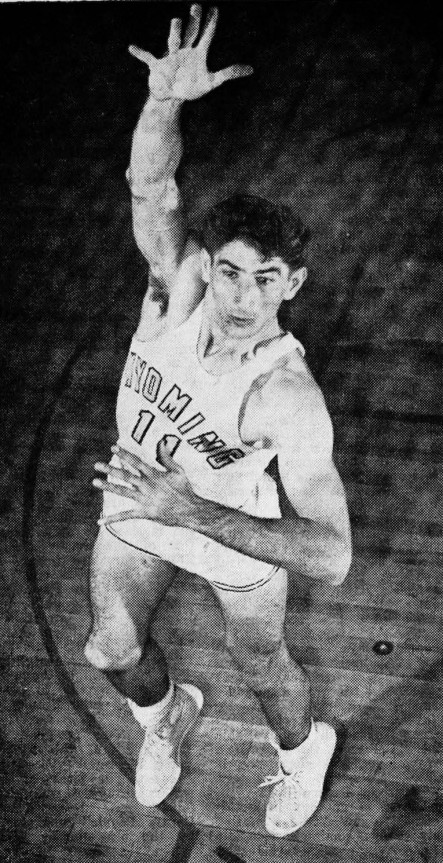
- Pilch at Wyoming

Personal information
- Born: July 11, 1925 Sheridan, Wyoming, U.S.
- Died: June 14, 1991 (aged 65)
- Listed height: 6 ft 3 in (1.91 m)
- Listed weight: 185 lb (84 kg)

Career information
- High school: Hot Springs County (Thermopolis, Wyoming)
- College: Wyoming (1946–1950)
- NBA draft: 1950: 2nd round, 14th overall pick
- Drafted by: Baltimore Bullets
- Position: Forward
- Number: 18

Career history
- 1951–1952: Minneapolis Lakers

Career highlights
- Second team All-American – Look, Collier's (1950)
- Stats at NBA.com
- Stats at Basketball Reference

John A. Pilch (July 11, 1925 – June 14, 1991) was an American basketball player in the National Basketball Association (NBA). He played college basketball for the Wyoming Cowboys from 1947 to 1950. During that time, he was Wyoming's leading scorer. In his senior season, Pilch averaged 11.5 points per game and was selected as an All-American basketball player. John was drafted in the second round of the 1950 NBA draft by the Baltimore Bullets. He played in one NBA season with the Minneapolis Lakers, 0.6 points and 1 rebound per game. In 1999, John was posthumously inducted into the University of Wyoming Athletics Hall of Fame.

== Career statistics ==
Legend
GP	Games played	GS	Games started	MPG	Minutes per game
FG%	Field goal percentage	3P%	3-point field goal percentage	FT%	Free throw percentage
RPG	Rebounds per game	APG	Assists per game	SPG	Steals per game
BPG	Blocks per game	PPG	Points per game	**Bold**	Career high

=== NBA ===
==== Regular season ====
Year	Team	GP	MPG	FG%	FT%	RPG	APG	PPG
1951–52	Minneapolis	9	4.6	.100	.500	1.0	.2	.6
