= Bob Wilson (basketball) =

American basketball player

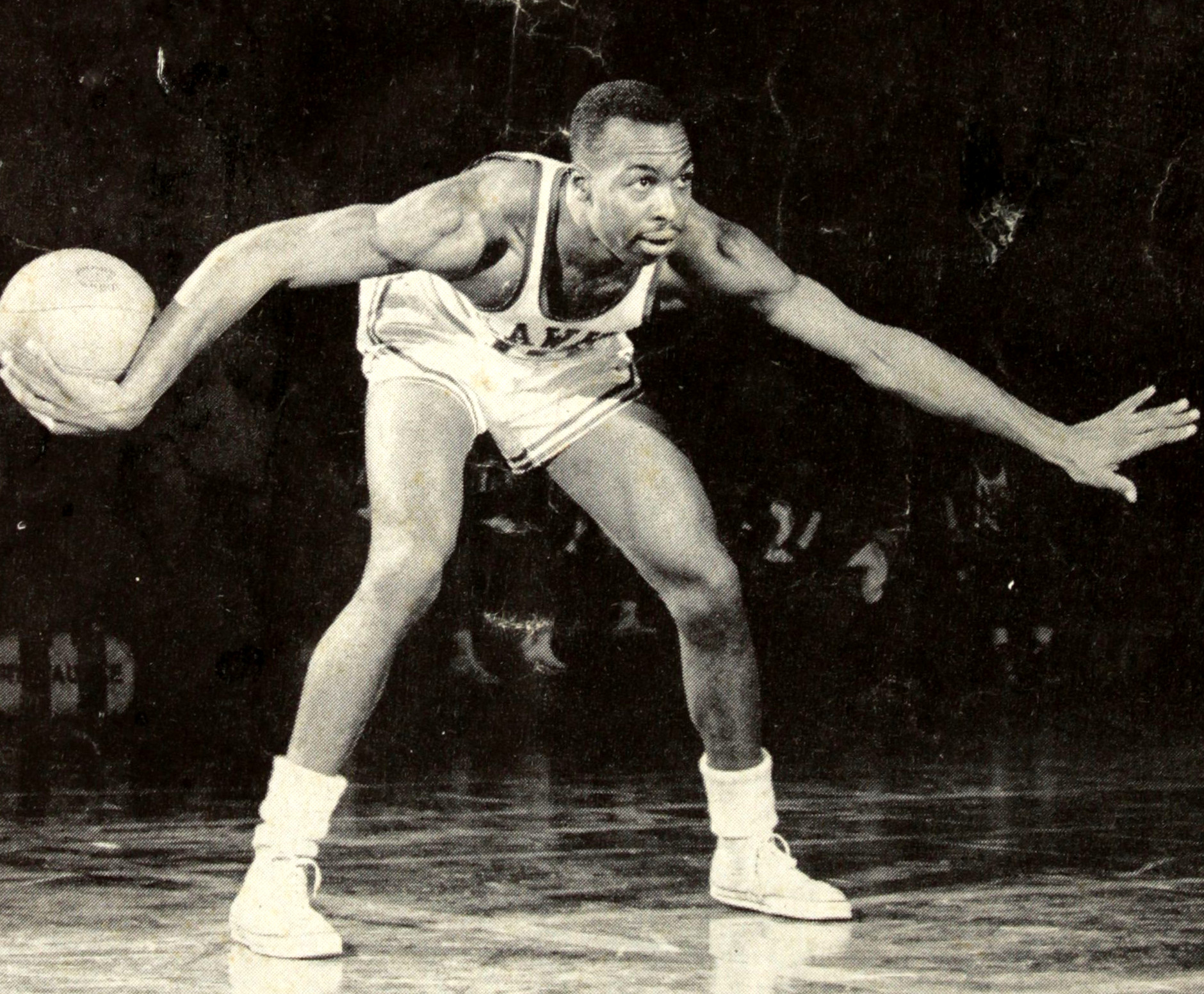
- Wilson with the Milwaukee Hawks in 1951

Personal information
- Born: March 8, 1926 Clarksburg, West Virginia, U.S.
- Died: August 26, 2014 (aged 88) Carson, California, U.S.
- Listed height: 6 ft 2 in (1.88 m)
- Listed weight: 220 lb (100 kg)

Career information
- High school: Kelly Miller (Clarksburg, West Virginia)
- College: West Virginia State (1946–1950)
- NBA draft: 1950: undrafted
- Position: Center
- Number: 12

Career history
- 1951–1952: Milwaukee Hawks
- Stats at NBA.com
- Stats at Basketball Reference

Robert Wilson Jr. (March 8, 1926 – August 26, 2014) was an American professional basketball player. He played for the Milwaukee Hawks in the National Basketball Association during 1951–52 after a collegiate career at West Virginia State University.

== Career statistics ==
Legend
GP	Games played	GS	Games started	MPG	Minutes per game
FG%	Field goal percentage	3P%	3-point field goal percentage	FT%	Free throw percentage
RPG	Rebounds per game	APG	Assists per game	SPG	Steals per game
BPG	Blocks per game	PPG	Points per game	**Bold**	Career high

=== NBA ===
==== Regular season ====
Year	Team	GP	MPG	FG%	FT%	RPG	APG	PPG
1951–52	Milwaukee	63	20.8	.299	.578	3.3	1.7	3.7
