= Don Lofgran =

American basketball player (1928–1976)

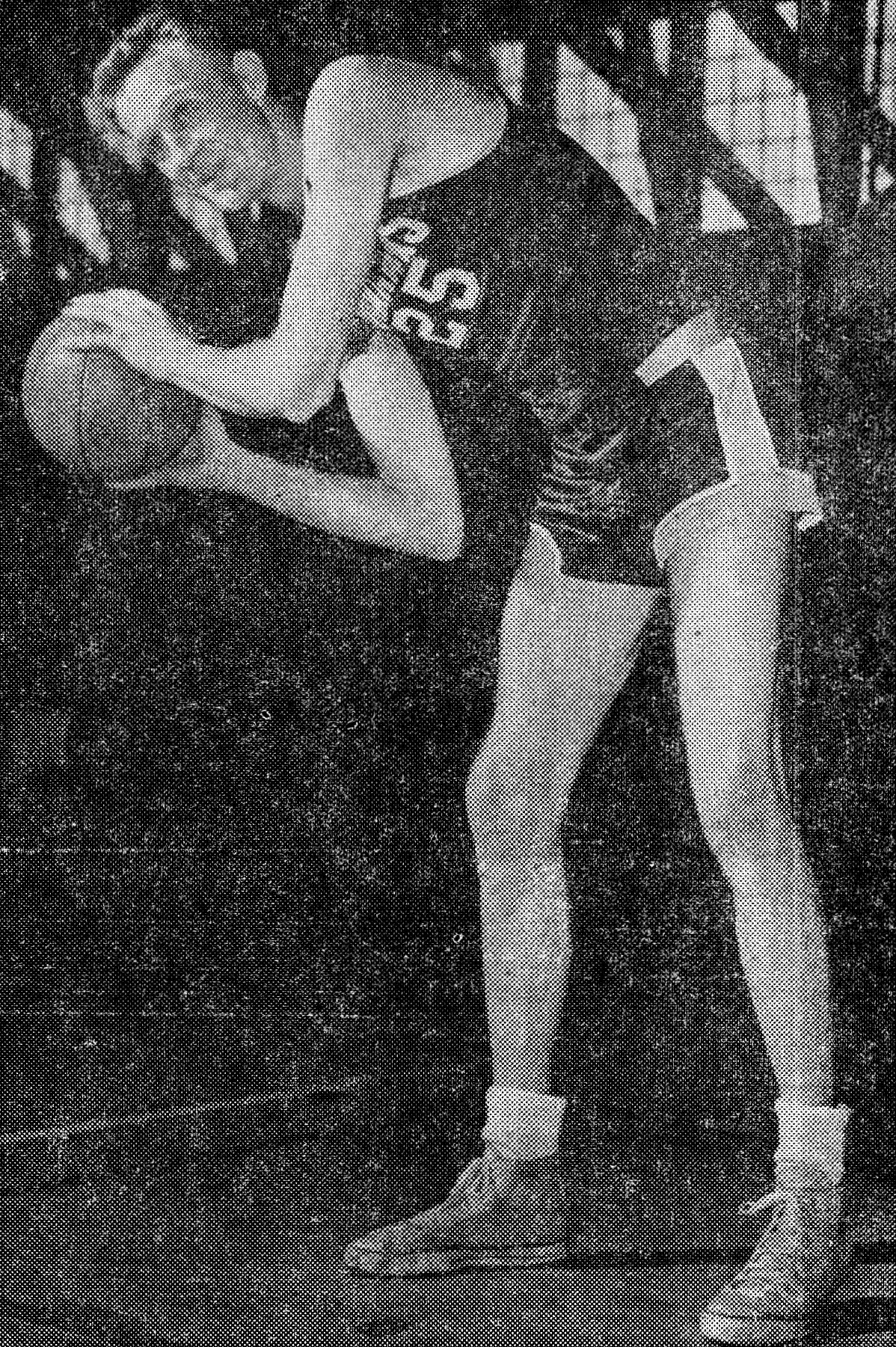
- Lofgran, circa 1955

Personal information
- Born: November 18, 1928 Oakland, California, U.S.
- Died: June 17, 1976 (aged 47) Salt Lake City, Utah, U.S.
- Listed height: 6 ft 5 in (1.96 m)
- Listed weight: 200 lb (91 kg)

Career information
- High school: Oakland Tech (Oakland, California)
- College: Grant Tech (1946–1948); San Francisco (1948–1950)
- NBA draft: 1950: 1st round, 11th overall pick
- Drafted by: Syracuse Nationals
- Playing career: 1950–1954
- Position: Small forward
- Number: 11, 18, 9, 8

Career history
- 1950–1951: Syracuse Nationals
- 1951–1952: Indianapolis Olympians
- 1951: Utica Pros
- 1952–1953: Philadelphia Warriors
- 1953–1954: Milwaukee Hawks

Career highlights
- Consensus second-team All-American (1950); California Mr. Basketball (1946)

Career NBA statistics
- Points: 1,265 (6.1 ppg)
- Rebounds: 817 (3.9 rpg)
- Assists: 216 (1.0 apg)
- Stats at NBA.com
- Stats at Basketball Reference

Donald James Lofgran (November 18, 1928 – June 17, 1976) was an American basketball player who was a consensus All-American in 1950 while at the University of San Francisco. He also played professionally in the National Basketball Association (NBA) from 1950 to 1954.

== Biography ==
Lofgran was a native of Oakland, California, and a 1946 graduate of Oakland Technical High School. He spent the first two years of college (1946–48) at Grant Technical College, a junior college in Sacramento, California (now American River College). He graduated Grant Tech and enrolled at the University of San Francisco to play for the Dons basketball team. While at USF, Lofgran averaged approximately 15 points per game for his career. In his junior season of 1948–49, Lofgran led the Dons to a 48–47 win over Loyola (IL) in the 1949 National Invitation Tournament and was named the Most Valuable Player.

Lofgran was drafted as the 11th pick in the first round of the 1950 NBA draft by the Syracuse Nationals. He was traded to the Indianapolis Olympians his rookie year. During Lofgran's four year NBA career, he also played for the Philadelphia Warriors and Milwaukee Hawks.

== Career statistics ==
Legend
GP	Games played	GS	Games started	MPG	Minutes per game
FG%	Field goal percentage	3P%	3-point field goal percentage	FT%	Free throw percentage
RPG	Rebounds per game	APG	Assists per game	SPG	Steals per game
BPG	Blocks per game	PPG	Points per game	**Bold**	Career high

=== NBA ===
==== Regular season ====
Year	Team	GP	MPG	FG%	FT%	RPG	APG	PPG
1950–51	Syracuse	47		.297	.624	2.0	.6	3.4
1950–51	Indianapolis	14		.284	.618	4.6	.5	5.4
1951–52	Indianapolis	63	19.9	**.357**	.712	4.1	.8	7.2
1952–53	Philadelphia	**64**	**27.9**	.330	**.728**	**5.3**	**1.7**	**7.4**
1953–54	Milwaukee	21	18.1	.313	.653	3.0	1.2	4.9
Career		209	23.1	.329	.692	3.9	1.0	6.1

==== Playoffs ====
Year	Team	GP	MPG	FG%	FT%	RPG	APG	PPG
1951	Indianapolis	1		**.333**	**1.000**	**1.0**	.0	**5.0**
1952	Indianapolis	**2**	5.0	.000	–	.0	.0	.0
Career		3	5.0	.222	1.000	.3	.0	1.7
