= 1944–45 Baltimore Bullets season =

ABL professional basketball team season

- League: American Basketball League (revived original)
- Head coach: Ben Kramer (2–3); Red Rosan (player-coach; 12–13)
- Arena: Tenth Armory Regiment

Results
- Record: 14–16 (.467)
- Place: Conference: 4th
- Playoff finish: Lost ABL championship series 2–1 to Philadelphia Sphas

The 1944–45 Baltimore Bullets season was the first ever season played by the original Baltimore Bullets (who are not related to the NBA team that's currently known as the Washington Wizards) when they were in the original American Basketball League, which was in its eighteenth season of existence when combining the six seasons of its original run with the twelve seasons in its more recent run at this point in time after their hiatus in relation to the Great Depression, even in spite of the team being created and then operating during World War II (although the team was operating near the end of that wartime era). Despite finishing their inaugural season with a losing 14–16 record, the Bullets would not only be the last team to qualify for the ABL playoffs, but also upset the Trenton Tigers in the semifinal round there before losing 2–1 to the Philadelphia Sphas for what would later become that franchise's final championship won in that league's history.

== Season overview ==
After the ABL ended its previous season with only four teams left in that season when the Brooklyn Indians (later becoming the Brooklyn Eagles by the 1944 World Professional Basketball Tournament) left the ABL in the first half of that season, the ABL created both the original Baltimore Bullets franchise (which would later join the BAA/NBA in their future history) and the Washington Capitols (who not only are unrelated to the future BAA/NBA/ABL team of the same name, but also ended up moving to Paterson, New Jersey on New Year's Day of 1945 to become the Paterson Crescents for the rest of that season) to help expand their league back up to six teams once again, similar to what the rivaling National Basketball League had done for their own 1944–45 season with two new teams being created there to expand their league back up to six teams themselves (in their case, creating the Chicago American Gears and technically reviving their old Pittsburgh Pirates as the Pittsburgh Raiders). While the Washington turned Paterson expansion franchise performed as poorly as one could expect an expansion franchise to do so with them having a last place 3–23 finish in the ABL (especially with them having two wins out of ten games in Washington and only one win out of sixteen more games up in Paterson), the Bullets would see themselves start out with a 2–3 record under their original head coach, Ben Kramer, before going 12–13 for the rest of their inaugural season under new head coach Red Rosan for a 14–16 to their first ever season of play. Despite ending their first season with a losing season, they would end up making it to the playoffs this season due to the ABL deciding to remove the old format of the best two teams of each half of the season competing against each other for the ABL's championship (or being crowned the champion automatically by default if one team won both halves) and instead allowing the best four teams of the league to compete against each other for multiple best of three series match-ups to determine the ABL's champions there. Surprisingly, the Bullets would not only defeat the #2 seeded Trenton Tigers 2–1 in the quarterfinal round (due in part to Trenton taking a week off to compete in a two day basketball tournament in Cleveland alongside a basketball tournament in Chicago that they ended up losing in the first round there), but also were one game away from upsetting the #1 seeded Philadelphia Sphas in the ABL Finals before losing the championship series 2–1 in their first ever season of existence despite ending the season with a losing record due to a balanced scoring effort from every player that was on the roster by that point in time (no player on the Bullets that stayed on their roster by the time the ABL Playoffs began averaged any more than 5.9 points per game this season).

== Roster ==
Due to information on American Basketball League players being generally hard to find, there are bound to be more gaps and/or inaccuracies found in certain areas on the team's roster spots than usual.

1944–45 Baltimore Bullets roster
Players

Pos.	No.	Player	Height	Weight	DOB	From
G		Eddie Balser	6 ft 0 in (1.83 m)			Brooklyn College
G/F		Moe Becker	6 ft 1 in (1.85 m)	185 lb (84 kg)	1917-02-24	Duquesne
G		Irv Biasi	5 ft 10 in (1.78 m)	180 lb (82 kg)	1917-10-24	Western Maryland
F/C		Eddie Boyle	6 ft 3 in (1.91 m)	180 lb (82 kg)	1917-06-15	Temple
F/C		Pete Caruso	6 ft 3 in (1.91 m)	180 lb (82 kg)	1920-08-01	Temple
F/C		Bob Cotton	6 ft 6 in (1.98 m)	250 lb (113 kg)	1920-12-29	Texas Wesleyan
G/F		Moe Dubilier	6 ft 2 in (1.88 m)	210 lb (95 kg)	1915-02-20	John Marshall University
G		Mac Kinsbruner	5 ft 9 in (1.75 m)	160 lb (73 kg)	1909-03-21	St. John's
C		Herm Knuppel	6 ft 8 in (2.03 m)	240 lb (109 kg)	1915-02-20	Panzer College
G		Bob Latshaw	6 ft 1 in (1.85 m)	190 lb (86 kg)	1917-02-23	USC
F/C		Fred Nimz	6 ft 3 in (1.91 m)	200 lb (91 kg)	1914-04-22	Stevens Point Teachers College
G		Abe Novak	5 ft 10 in (1.78 m)	170 lb (77 kg)	1917-09-23	James Monroe HS (NY)
G		George Pajak	5 ft 9 in (1.75 m)	165 lb (75 kg)	1916-08-12	Georgetown
G		Red Paris	5 ft 8 in (1.73 m)	150 lb (68 kg)	1918-01-08	CCNY
G		Phil Rabin	5 ft 9 in (1.75 m)	160 lb (73 kg)	1913-07-10	Long Island
G/F		Red Rosan	6 ft 2 in (1.88 m)	195 lb (88 kg)	1911-05-22	Temple
F	21	Ben Scharnus	6 ft 2 in (1.88 m)	173 lb (78 kg)	1917-12-11	Seton Hall
F/C		Irv Schneider	6 ft 3 in (1.91 m)	200 lb (91 kg)	1916-01-11	Abraham Lincoln HS (NY)
G		Bob Sigholtz	6 ft 1 in (1.85 m)	185 lb (84 kg)	1919-11-04	West Philadelphia HS (PA)
G		Lou Simon	5 ft 11 in (1.80 m)	155 lb (70 kg)	1916-02-13	Long Island
F/C		Art Spector	6 ft 4 in (1.93 m)	200 lb (91 kg)	1918-10-17	Villanova
G		Stanley Stutz	5 ft 11 in (1.80 m)	175 lb (79 kg)	1920-04-14	Rhode Island State College

Coaches
Head coach

Ben Kramer (fired)
Red Rosan (player-coach)

Legend
- (DP) Unsigned draft pick
- (FA) Free agent
- (S) Suspended
- Injured

Roster

The official playoff roster of the Baltimore Bullets for this season would include Moe Becker, Eddie Boyle, Moe Dubilier, Herm Knuppel, Bob Latshaw (who joined their roster just for one game in the 1945 ABL Playoffs), Fred Nimz, Red Paris, Red Rosan, Ben Scharnus, Art Spector, and Stanley Stutz. Two other individuals named Ben Chambers and Frank Johnson might have also played a couple of games for the team during this season as well, though it's ultimately unconfirmed at this time since it's possible they might have accidentally been mixed up or lumped in with games that would be considered unofficial to the ABL (i.e., games that are considered exhibition matches, games that are against interleague opponents like those from the National Basketball League, barnstorming teams, etc.) instead.

== ABL Season Standings ==
Pos.	Team	Wins	Losses	Win %
1	Philadelphia Sphas - z	22	8	.733
2	Trenton Tigers - x	21	9	.700
3	Wilmington Bombers - x	14	14	.500
4	Baltimore Bullets - x	14	16	.467
5	Westchester Indians / New York Gothams*	11	15	.423
6	Washington Capitols / Paterson Crescents**	3	23	.115

* - The Westchester Indians (sometimes referred to as the New York Westchesters) would move from White Plains, New York to Brooklyn, New York on January 20, 1945, thus subsequently changing their team name from the Westchester Indians (or New York Westchesters) to the New York Gothams in the process.
** - The Washington Capitols (no relation to the Washington Capitols team from the BAA/NBA that briefly moved to the ABL at one point themselves) would move from Washington, D.C. to Paterson, New Jersey on January 1, 1945, thus subsequently changing their team name from the original Washington Capitols ABL team to the Paterson Crescents in the process.

== ABL Playoffs ==
=== ABL Semifinals ===
(2) Trenton Tigers vs. (4) Baltimore Bullets: Baltimore wins series 2–1

- Game 1: March 15, 1945 @ Baltimore: Baltimore 48, Trenton 38
- Game 2: March 16, 1945 @ Trenton: Trenton 43, Baltimore 38
- Game 3: April 2, 1945 @ Baltimore: Baltimore 39, Trenton 34

In-between Games 2 and 3 of the semifinal round, the Trenton Tigers would actually compete in a professional basketball tournament that was held in Cleveland, Ohio that was taking place on March 17 and 18, 1945 (which presumably was the Cleveland Pro Basketball Tournament), while players from the ABL would actually play in the 1945 World Professional Basketball Tournament for independently ran service teams like the Dayton Acmes and Long Island Grumman Hellcats (since some players also worked for military services in their spare time also during World War II) from March 19-24, 1945 before later returning to play the semifinals for the 1945 ABL Playoffs properly.

=== ABL Championship Round ===
(1) Philadelphia Sphas vs. (4) Baltimore Bullets: Philadelphia wins series 2–1

- Game 1: April 5, 1945 @ Baltimore: Philadelphia 57, Baltimore 32
- Game 2: April 7, 1945 @ Philadelphia: Baltimore 47, Philadelphia 46
- Game 3: April 14, 1945 @ Philadelphia: Philadelphia 46, Baltimore 40

Originally, the championship series was meant to be a best-of-five championship series before it got shortened down into a best-of-three series due to time constraints.
