= Nate DeLong =

American basketball player (1926–2010)

Personal information
- Born: January 5, 1926 Chippewa Falls, Wisconsin, U.S.
- Died: May 5, 2010 (aged 84) Duluth, Minnesota, U.S.
- Listed height: 6 ft 6 in (1.98 m)
- Listed weight: 220 lb (100 kg)

Career information
- High school: Chippewa Falls (Chippewa Falls, Wisconsin)
- College: Wisconsin–River Falls (1946–1950)
- NBA draft: 1950: 9th round, 99th overall pick
- Drafted by: Tri-Cities Blackhawks
- Position: Center
- Number: 21

Career history
- 1952: Milwaukee Hawks
- Stats at NBA.com
- Stats at Basketball Reference

Nathan J. DeLong (January 5, 1926 – May 5, 2010) was a center in the National Basketball Association (NBA).

== Biography ==
A native of Chippewa Falls, Wisconsin, DeLong was a long-time resident of Hayward, Wisconsin. He attended the University of Wisconsin-River Falls. From 1989 to 2008, he served on the Board of Supervisors of Sawyer County, Wisconsin. After serving aboard the USS Valencia (AKA-81) in the United States Navy during World War II, DeLong married Donna Wells. He had two children.

== Professional basketball career ==
DeLong was drafted in the ninth round of the 1950 NBA draft by the Tri-Cities Blackhawks. He later played with the franchise after it moved to Milwaukee, Wisconsin from Moline, Illinois and became the Milwaukee Hawks.

== Career statistics ==
Legend
| GP | Games played | GS | Games started | MPG | Minutes per game |
| FG% | Field goal percentage | 3P% | 3-point field goal percentage | FT% | Free throw percentage |
| RPG | Rebounds per game | APG | Assists per game | SPG | Steals per game |
| BPG | Blocks per game | PPG | Points per game | **Bold** | Career high |

=== NBA ===
==== Regular season ====
| Year | Team | GP | MPG | FG% | FT% | RPG | APG | PPG |
|---|---|---|---|---|---|---|---|---|
| 1951–52 | Milwaukee | 17 | 7.8 | .476 | .686 | 1.8 | .8 | 3.8 |
