= 1950 NBA draft =

Basketball player selection

General information
- Sport: Basketball
- Date: April 25, 1950
- Location: Biltmore Hotel (Chicago, Illinois)

Overview
- 121 total selections in 12 rounds
- League: NBA
- First selection: Chuck Share, Boston Celtics
- Hall of Famers: 7: G Paul Arizin; G Bob Cousy; G George Yardley; F Chuck Cooper; G Bill Sharman; C Neil Johnston; F Earl Lloyd

The 1950 NBA draft was the first draft following the 1949 merger of the Basketball Association of America and the National Basketball League that created the National Basketball Association (NBA). The draft was held on April 25, 1950, before the 1950–51 season. In this draft, 12 remaining NBA teams took turns selecting amateur U.S. college basketball players. In each round, the teams select in reverse order of their win–loss record in the previous season. The Chicago Stags participated in the draft but folded prior to the start of the season. The draft consisted of 12 rounds comprising 121 players selected.

== Draft selections and draftee career notes ==
Chuck Share from Bowling Green State University was selected first overall by the Boston Celtics. Paul Arizin from Villanova University was selected before the draft as Philadelphia Warriors' territorial pick. The sixth pick, Irwin Dambrot, did not play in the NBA and opted for a career as a dentist. Five players from this draft, Paul Arizin, Bob Cousy, George Yardley, Bill Sharman and Earl Lloyd have been inducted into the Basketball Hall of Fame.

Chuck Cooper, the 12th pick, and Lloyd, the 100th pick, were the first African Americans to be drafted by an NBA team. Lloyd became the first African American to play in the NBA on October 31, 1950, one day before Cooper made his debut.

== Key ==
Pos.	G	F	C
Position	Guard	Forward	Center

^	Denotes player who has been inducted to the Naismith Memorial Basketball Hall of Fame
*	Denotes player who has been selected for at least one All-Star Game and All-NBA Team
^{#}	Denotes player who has never appeared in an NBA regular-season or playoff game
^{~}	Denotes player who has been selected as Rookie of the Year

== Draft ==
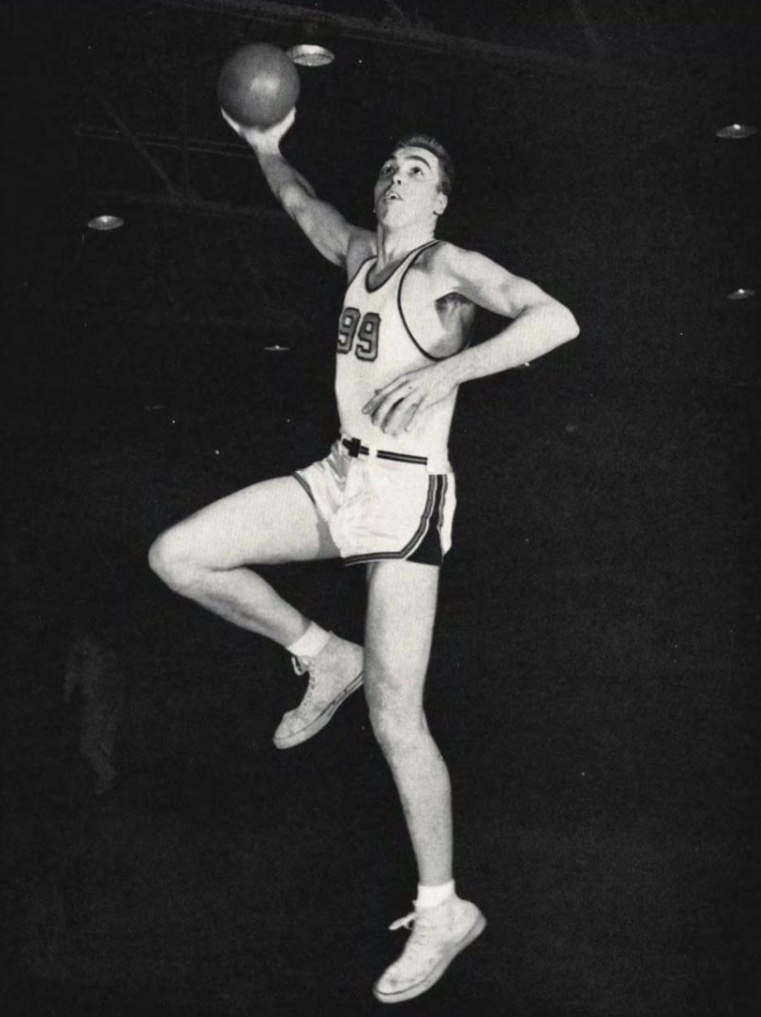
Chuck Share was the first overall selection.

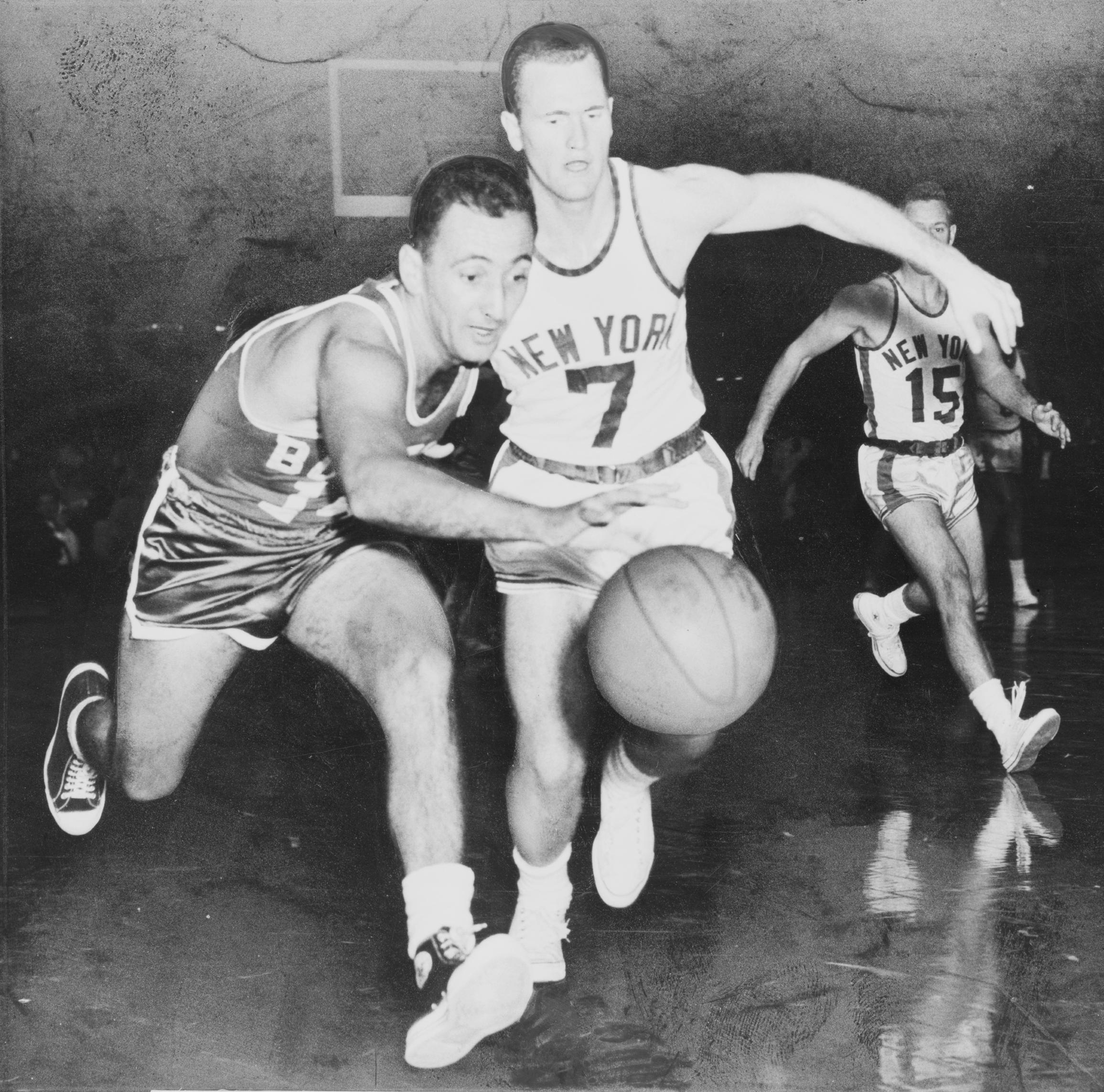
Bob Cousy (left) was selected third overall by the Tri-Cities Blackhawks.

Round	Pick	Player	Position	Nationality	Team	College
T	–	Paul Arizin^^{~}	G/F	United States	Philadelphia Warriors	Villanova
1	1	Chuck Share	C	United States	Boston Celtics	Bowling Green
1	2	Don Rehfeldt	F	United States	Baltimore Bullets	Wisconsin
1	3	Bob Cousy^	G	United States	Tri-Cities Blackhawks	Holy Cross
1	4	Dick Schnittker	F	United States	Washington Capitols	Ohio State
1	5	Larry Foust*	F/C	United States	Chicago Stags	La Salle
1	6	Irwin Dambrot^{#}	F	United States	New York Knicks	CCNY
1	7	George Yardley^	G/F	United States	Fort Wayne Pistons	Stanford
1	8	Bob Lavoy	F/C	United States	Indianapolis Olympians	Western Kentucky
1	9	Joe McNamee	F/C	United States	Rochester Royals	San Francisco
1	10	Kevin O'Shea	G	United States	Minneapolis Lakers	Notre Dame
1	11	Don Lofgran	F/C	United States	Syracuse Nationals	San Francisco
2	12	Chuck Cooper^	F	United States	Boston Celtics	Duquesne
2	13	John Pilch	F	United States	Baltimore Bullets	Wyoming
2	14	Ed Dahler	F	United States	Philadelphia Warriors	Duquesne
2	15	Ed Gayda	G/F	United States	Tri-Cities Blackhawks	Washington State
2	16	Bill Sharman^	G	United States	Washington Capitols	USC
2	17	Wally Osterkorn	F/C	United States	Chicago Stags	Illinois
2	18	Herb Scherer	C	United States	New York Knicks	Long Island
2	19	Jim Riffey	F	United States	Fort Wayne Pistons	Tulane
2	20	Paul Unruh^{#}	F	United States	Indianapolis Olympians	Bradley
2	21	George Stanich^{#}	G/F	United States	Rochester Royals	UCLA
2	22	Hal Haskins^{#}	G/F	United States	Minneapolis Lakers	Hamline
2	23	Gerald Calabrese	G	United States	Syracuse Nationals	St. John's

== Other picks ==
The following list includes other draft picks who have appeared in at least one NBA game.

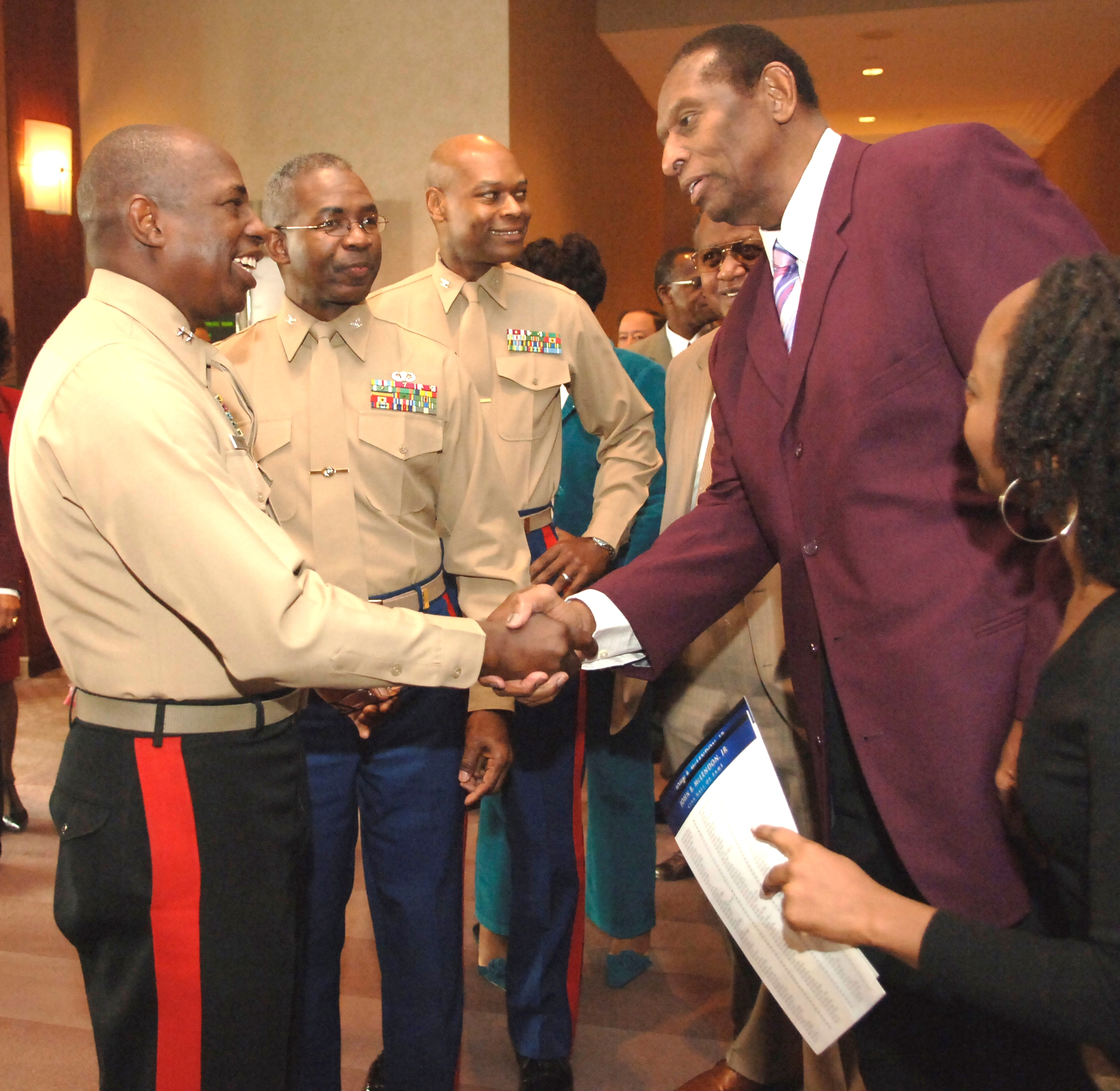
Earl Lloyd (right) was selected 100th overall and became the first African American to play in the NBA.

Round	Pick	Player	Position	Nationality	Team	College
3	24	Bob Donham	G/F	United States	Boston Celtics	Ohio State
3	25	Dick Dickey	G	United States	Baltimore Bullets	NC State
3	28	Alan Sawyer	F	United States	Washington Capitols	UCLA
3	31	Art Burris	F	United States	Fort Wayne Pistons	Tennessee
3	32	Chuck Mrazovich	F	United States	Indianapolis Olympians	Eastern Kentucky
4	40	Tommy O'Keefe	G	United States	Washington Capitols	Georgetown
4	41	Ken Murray	G/F	United States	Chicago Stags	St. Bonaventure
4	46	Bud Grant	F	United States	Minneapolis Lakers	Minnesota
5	49	Norm Mager	F	United States	Baltimore Bullets	CCNY
5	50	Ike Borsavage	F/C	United States	Philadelphia Warriors	Temple
5	51	Cal Christensen	F/C	United States	Tri-Cities Blackhawks	Toledo
5	52	Claude Overton	G	United States	Washington Capitols	East Central State
5	58	Ed Beach	F	United States	Minneapolis Lakers	West Virginia
6	60	Francis Mahoney	F	United States	Boston Celtics	Brown
6	68	Ralph O'Brien	G	United States	Indianapolis Olympians	Butler
7	80	Leon Blevins	G	United States	Indianapolis Olympians	Arizona
7	82	Joe Hutton	G	United States	Minneapolis Lakers	Hamline
8	89	George King	G	United States	Chicago Stags	Morris Harvey
9	99	Nate DeLong	C	United States	Tri-Cities Blackhawks	River Falls State
9	100	Earl Lloyd^	F/C	United States	Washington Capitols	West Virginia State

== Notable undrafted players ==
These players were not selected in the 1950 draft, but played at least one game in the NBA.

Player	Pos.	Nationality	School/club team
Ed Earle	F	United States	Loyola (Illinois)
Jerry Fowler	C	United States	Missouri
Neil Johnston^	C	United States	Ohio State
Al Masino	G	United States	Canisius
Andy O'Donnell	G	United States	Loyola (Maryland)
Sherwin Raiken	G	United States	Villanova
Bob Wilson	G	United States	West Virginia State

== See also ==
- List of first overall NBA draft picks
- NBA records
