= Walt Budko =

American basketball player and coach

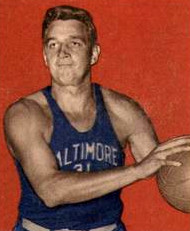
- Budko in 1948

Personal information
- Born: July 30, 1925 Kearney, New Jersey, U.S.
- Died: May 25, 2013 (aged 87) Timonium, Maryland, U.S.
- Listed height: 6 ft 5 in (1.96 m)
- Listed weight: 220 lb (100 kg)

Career information
- High school: Trinity School (New York City, New York)
- College: Columbia (1942–1944, 1946–1948)
- BAA draft: 1948: 1st round, 6th overall pick
- Drafted by: Baltimore Bullets
- Playing career: 1948–1952
- Position: Power forward / center
- Number: 12, 19

Career history

Playing
- 1948–1951: Baltimore Bullets
- 1951–1952: Philadelphia Warriors

Coaching
- 1951: Baltimore Bullets

Career highlights
- Third-team All-American – Helms (1948)

Career BAA and NBA statistics
- Points: 2,037 (8.1 ppg)
- Rebounds: 684 (5.4 rpg)
- Assists: 471 (1.9 apg)
- Stats at NBA.com
- Stats at Basketball Reference

Walter L. Budko Jr. (July 30, 1925 – May 25, 2013) was an American professional basketball player.

He played collegiately for Columbia University.

He was selected by the Baltimore Bullets with the sixth overall pick of the 1948 BAA draft. He played for the Bullets (1948–51) and Philadelphia Warriors (1951–52) in the BAA and NBA for 253 games. He coached the Bullets in the NBA (1950–51).

== BAA/NBA career statistics ==
Legend
GP	Games played	MPG	Minutes per game
FG%	Field-goal percentage	FT%	Free-throw percentage
RPG	Rebounds per game	APG	Assists per game
PPG	Points per game	**Bold**	Career high

=== Regular season ===
Year	Team	GP	MPG	FG%	FT%	RPG	APG	PPG
1948–49	Baltimore	60	–	.348	**.790**	–	1.7	**11.5**
1949–50	Baltimore	**66**	–	.304	.757	–	**2.2**	9.0
1950–51	Baltimore	64	–	.356	.744	**7.1**	2.1	7.8
1951–52	Philadelphia	63	**17.9**	**.404**	.674	3.7	1.4	4.0
Career		253	17.9	.342	.757	5.4	1.9	8.1

=== Playoffs ===
Year	Team	GP	MPG	FG%	FT%	RPG	APG	PPG
1949	Baltimore	**3**	–	.423	**.789**	–	1.3	**12.3**
1952	Philadelphia	**3**	**19.3**	**.429**	.571	**4.0**	**1.7**	5.3
Career		6	19.3	.425	.731	4.0	1.5	8.8

== Head coaching record ==
Team	Year	G	W	L	W–L%	Finish	PG	PW	PL	PW–L%	Result
Baltimore	1950–51	29	10	19	.345	5th in Eastern	—	—	—	—	Missed playoffs
Career		29	10	19	.345		0	0	0	–	
