= Don Rehfeldt =

American basketball player (1927–1980)

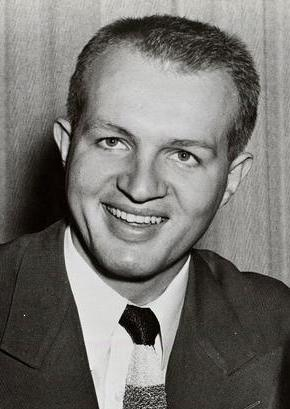
- Rehfeldt circa 1950

Personal information
- Born: January 7, 1927 Chicago, Illinois, U.S.
- Died: October 16, 1980 (aged 53) Wisconsin Rapids, Wisconsin, U.S.
- Listed height: 6 ft 7 in (2.01 m)
- Listed weight: 210 lb (95 kg)

Career information
- High school: Amundsen (Chicago, Illinois)
- College: Wisconsin (1944–1945, 1946–1950)
- NBA draft: 1950: 1st round, 2nd overall pick
- Drafted by: Baltimore Bullets
- Playing career: 1950–1952
- Position: Power forward
- Number: 15, 13

Career history
- 1950–1951: Baltimore Bullets
- 1951–1952: Milwaukee Hawks

Career highlights
- Consensus second-team All-American (1950)

Career NBA statistics
- Points: 692 (7.1 ppg)
- Rebounds: 494 (5.0 rpg)
- Assists: 118 (1.2 apg)
- Stats at NBA.com
- Stats at Basketball Reference

Donald W. Rehfeldt (January 7, 1927 – October 16, 1980) was an American basketball player. He was the second overall pick in the 1950 NBA draft by the Baltimore Bullets from the Wisconsin Badgers.

== Basketball career ==
He was a graduate of Amundsen High School in Chicago and went on to become a two time Big Ten (then Western Conference) leading scorer in 1949 and 1950 and the Big Ten MVP in 1950 at Wisconsin. He was also a first-team All-American in 1950. Don is a charter member of the University of Wisconsin–Madison Athletic Hall of Fame, elected in 1991. He is also a member of the Illinois Public League Hall of Fame and the Illinois Basketball Coaches Hall of Fame. He was most noted for his hook shot.

During the 1946–1947 season, Rehfeldt returned from World War II and sparked a rally against Minnesota that lead to a Big Ten Championship for the Badgers and a berth in the NCAA Elite Eight. Rehfeldt averaged 11.2 points per game as a sophomore in 1947–1948 as Wisconsin was 12–8 under Coach Bud Foster. He then averaged 17.3 points and Wisconsin was 12–10 in 1948–1949. As a senior in 1949–1950, Rehfeldt averaged 19.8 points, as Wisconsin finished 17–5.

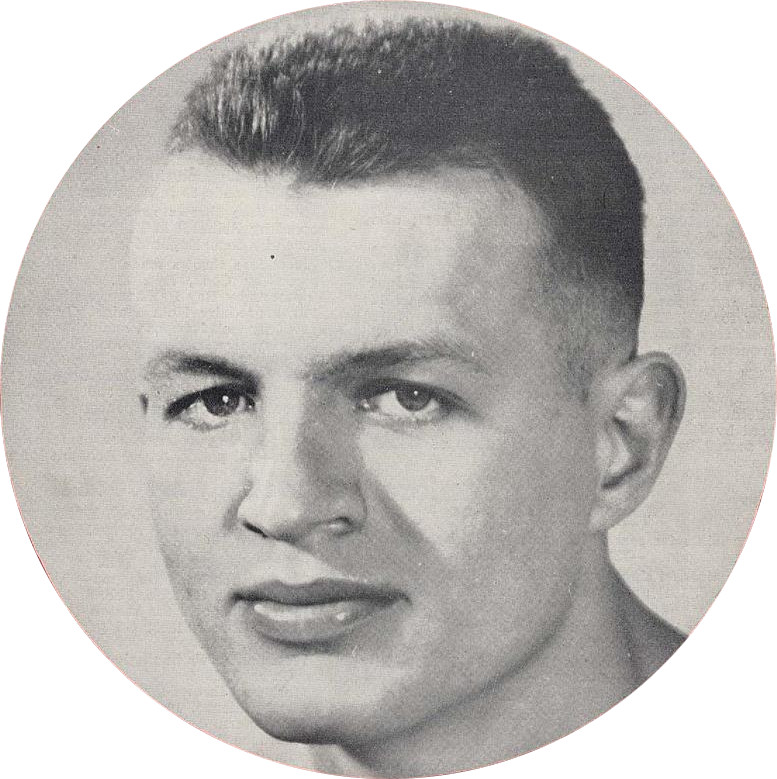
Rehfeldt circa 1949

Overall, Rehfeldt averaged 14.4 points in 81 games at Wisconsin, scoring 1169 career points.

Upon graduation in 1950, Rehfeldt was the Badgers' all-time leading scorer and held 14 other individual records. He was the first Badger to score 1,000 points. He held the Badger record as its last All-American for 56 years until Alando Tucker was named a First Team All-American in 2007.

After graduation, Rehfeldt played in the "World Series of Basketball", which was a nationwide tour that matched College All-Americans against the Harlem Globetrotters. He was the leading scorer on that tour. His teammates included top 50 all time NBA players Paul Arizin and Bob Cousy.

== NBA career ==
Rehfeldt was the second overall pick in the 1950 NBA draft by the Baltimore Bullets.

In his NBA career, Rehfeldt averaged 7.0 points and 4.2 rebounds in 69 games with the Baltimore Bullets. On November 29, 1951, he was sold by the Bullets to the Milwaukee Hawks. He averaged 7.1 points and 6.0 rebounds in 29 games with the Hawks. Rehfeldt also signed a contract with the Boston Celtics and was in their camp for the 1952 season but did not make the final roster.

== Personal life ==
Rehfeldt was also an avid bridge player and achieved the rank of Life Master along with his wife, Joyce.

He served nearly 16 years on the board of education of Wisconsin Rapids, Wisconsin.

Rehfeldt died on October 16, 1980, at age 53 of cancer.

== Career statistics ==
Legend
GP	Games played	GS	Games started	MPG	Minutes per game
FG%	Field goal percentage	3P%	3-point field goal percentage	FT%	Free throw percentage
RPG	Rebounds per game	APG	Assists per game	SPG	Steals per game
BPG	Blocks per game	PPG	Points per game	**Bold**	Career high

=== NBA ===
==== Regular season ====
Year	Team	GP	MPG	FG%	FT%	RPG	APG	PPG
1950–51	Baltimore	**59**		**.385**	.741	4.3	1.2	**7.3**
1951–52	Baltimore	10	19.4	.339	.609	**6.9**	1.2	5.4
1951–52	Milwaukee	29	**20.5**	.350	**.860**	6.0	**1.3**	7.1
Career		98	20.2	.370	.758	5.0	1.2	7.1

== Honors and awards ==
- Big Ten Conference Most Valuable Player in 1950
- First Team All-American 1950
- First Team All-Big Ten, 1949 & 1950
- 2nd Team All-Big Ten 1948
- Big Ten leading Scorer, 1949 & 1950
- Lead the Badgers in Free Throw percentage in 1949 and 1950
- Lead the Badgers in Field Goal percentage in 1948, 1949 and 1950
- Still holds the record for three of the top four shot attempts in a game by an individual
- Scored 34 points against Iowa in 1949 and 35 points against Northwestern in 1950, which was a Chicago Stadium scoring record at the time
- Charter member of the University of Wisconsin–Madison Athletic Hall of Fame (1991).
- First Badger to score 1000 points
- Elected to the IBCA/Basketball Museum of Illinois Hall of Fame in 1974
- Elected to the Chicago Public League Hall of Fame – May 2009
- Finished his Badger Career with 14 of 28 Individual Scoring Records
