= Ken Murray (basketball player) =

American basketball player (1928–2008)

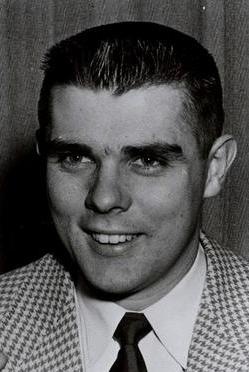
- Murray, circa 1950

Personal information
- Born: April 20, 1928 West Orange, New Jersey, U.S.
- Died: June 15, 2008 (aged 80) Montclair, New Jersey, U.S.
- Listed height: 6 ft 2 in (1.88 m)
- Listed weight: 190 lb (86 kg)

Career information
- College: St. Bonaventure (1946–1950)
- NBA draft: 1950: 4th round, 41st overall pick
- Drafted by: Chicago Stags
- Playing career: 1950–1955
- Position: Shooting guard
- Number: 9, 15, 4

Career history
- 1950–1951: Baltimore Bullets
- 1951: Fort Wayne Pistons
- 1951–1952: Washington Capitols
- 1953–1954: Fort Wayne Pistons
- 1954: Baltimore Bullets
- 1954–1955: Philadelphia Warriors

Career highlights
- No. 13 retired by St. Bonaventure Bonnies

Career NBA statistics
- Points: 1,471 (8.1 ppg)
- Rebounds: 599 (3.3 rpg)
- Assists: 482 (2.7 apg)
- Stats at NBA.com
- Stats at Basketball Reference

Kenneth Stanley Murray Jr. (April 20, 1928 – June 15, 2008) was an American professional basketball player. Murray was selected in the fourth round of the 1950 NBA draft by the Chicago Stags after a collegiate career at St. Bonaventure. In the 1950–51 season he was selected as an NBA All-Star alternate for the Eastern Conference while playing for the Baltimore Bullets.

== Career statistics ==
Legend
GP	Games played	GS	Games started	MPG	Minutes per game
FG%	Field goal percentage	3P%	3-point field goal percentage	FT%	Free throw percentage
RPG	Rebounds per game	APG	Assists per game	SPG	Steals per game
BPG	Blocks per game	PPG	Points per game	**Bold**	Career high

=== NBA ===
==== Regular season ====
Year	Team	GP	MPG	FG%	FT%	RPG	APG	PPG
1950–51	Baltimore	52	–	.349	.742	**5.5**	2.9	**13.7**
1950–51	Fort Wayne	14	–	.294	**.772**	4.9	3.8	9.9
1953–54	Fort Wayne	49	10.8	.272	.717	1.3	1.1	3.0
1954–55	Baltimore	6	22.3	**.377**	.714	1.8	**4.3**	9.3
1954–55	Philadelphia	**60**	**24.3**	.346	.765	2.8	3.3	6.9
Career		181	18.4	.335	.747	3.3	2.7	8.1

==== Playoffs ====
Year	Team	GP	MPG	FG%	FT%	RPG	APG	PPG
1951	Fort Wayne	3	–	.229	.800	**4.7**	**3.3**	**8.7**
1954	Fort Wayne	3	5.0	**.600**	**1.000**	.0	.0	4.7
Career		6	5.0	.293	.857	2.3	1.7	6.7
