= Chuck Cooper (basketball) =

American basketball player (1926–1984)

Personal information
- Born: September 29, 1926 Pittsburgh, Pennsylvania, U.S.
- Died: February 5, 1984 (aged 57) Pittsburgh, Pennsylvania, U.S.
- Listed height: 6 ft 5 in (1.96 m)
- Listed weight: 210 lb (95 kg)

Career information
- High school: Westinghouse (Pittsburgh, Pennsylvania)
- College: West Virginia State (1944–1945); Duquesne (1946–1950)
- NBA draft: 1950: 2nd round, 13th overall pick
- Drafted by: Boston Celtics
- Playing career: 1950–1956
- Position: Small forward / shooting guard
- Number: 11, 15, 6

Career history
- 1950–1954: Boston Celtics
- 1954–1956: Milwaukee / St. Louis Hawks
- 1956: Fort Wayne Pistons

Career highlights
- Consensus second-team All-American (1950); No. 15 retired by Duquesne Dukes

Career statistics
- Points: 2,725 (6.7 ppg)
- Rebounds: 2,431 (5.9 rpg)
- Assists: 734 (1.8 apg)
- Stats at NBA.com
- Stats at Basketball Reference
- Basketball Hall of Fame

Charles Henry Cooper (September 29, 1926 – February 5, 1984) was an American professional basketball player. Cooper played college basketball for the Duquesne Dukes and was named a consensus second-team All-American in 1950. According to the November 18, 1950 issue of the Afro-American newspaper, he was the first Black "basketer" [sic] to be named an All-American college athlete. Cooper was the first African-American to be drafted by a National Basketball Association (NBA) team; he was chosen by the Boston Celtics with the first pick of the second round of the 1950 NBA Draft. Cooper and two others—Nat "Sweetwater" Clifton and Earl Lloyd—became the first African-American players in the NBA, in 1950. In a six-season NBA career, Cooper played for the Celtics, the Milwaukee/St. Louis Hawks, and the Fort Wayne Pistons, averaging 6.7 points and 5.9 rebounds per game.

Cooper was inducted into the Naismith Memorial Basketball Hall of Fame on September 9, 2019.

== Early life and college career ==
Cooper was born in Pittsburgh, Pennsylvania, the son of Daniel and Emma Cooper. Daniel was a mailman, and Emma was a school teacher. He attended Pittsburgh's Westinghouse High School and graduated in 1944. For his senior year, he averaged more than 13 points per game and was an All-City first-team center. He then attended and played a semester of basketball for West Virginia State College (University since 2004) before being drafted to serve in the United States Navy in the final stages of World War II.

Following his service, he enrolled at Duquesne University where he was an All-American, started all four years, and set the school record for total points with 990 in four seasons. During his time at Duquesne, the team had a 78–19 record and was invited to the then-prestigious National Invitation Tournament twice. He was a captain for the 1949–50 team, which was the first team from the university to be nationally ranked all season, finishing with a 23–6 record and ranked sixth nationally.

== NBA career ==
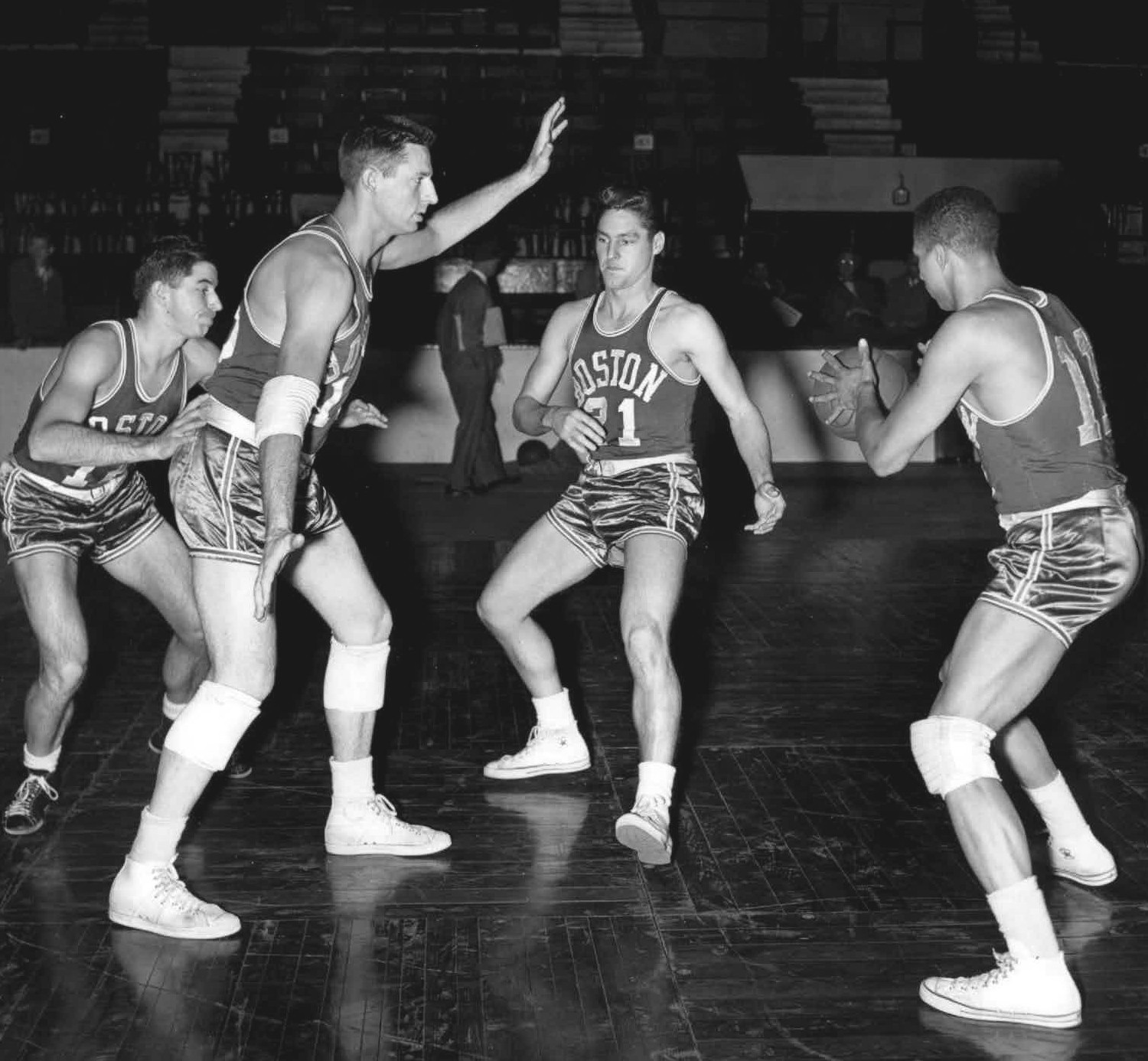
The 1953–54 Boston Celtics basketball team practicing the pick and roll. From left to rightː Bob Donham, Ed Mikan, Bill Sharman and Chuck Cooper.

Coming out of college in 1950, Cooper signed with the Harlem Globetrotters. On April 25, 1950, he became the first African American drafted into the NBA when the Boston Celtics chose him with the 13th overall pick. Cooper was drafted by Celtics' owner Walter A. Brown, coached by the legendary Red Auerbach and a teammate of the great Bob Cousy. When officials from other teams learned of Boston's interest in Cooper, they suggested he should not be drafted because he was black; however, Brown's famous quote was: "I don't give a damn if he's striped, plaid or polka dot. Boston takes Charles Cooper of Duquesne." Cooper made his NBA debut on November 1, 1950, against the Fort Wayne Pistons.

Cooper played four years with the Celtics, then was traded to the Milwaukee Hawks before ending his career as a member of the Ft. Wayne Pistons. After that, he spent a year playing for the Harlem Magicians, before injuring his back in a car crash and leaving basketball. During his NBA career, Cooper played a total of 409 games, scored 2,725 points for an average of 6.66 points per game, had 2,431 rebounds for an average of 5.9 per game, and had 733 assists for an average of 1.79 per game. As some statistics were not kept during that time, it is not known how many blocked shots, steals, or turnovers he had during his career.

== After the NBA ==
After his NBA career, Cooper graduated with a Master of Social Work from the University of Minnesota in 1960. He was married twice; first in 1951, and then in 1957 to Irva Lee (with whom he had four children). He worked to improve his hometown of Pittsburgh, serving on the Pittsburgh school board, and was appointed the director of parks and recreation for the city, becoming the first Black department head. He also helped the Pittsburgh National Bank's affirmative action program as an urban affairs officer until he died in Pittsburgh at the age of 57 on February 5, 1984, of liver cancer at Forbes Hospice.

== NBA career statistics ==
Legend
GP	Games played	GS	Games started	MPG	Minutes per game
FG%	Field goal percentage	3P%	3-point field goal percentage	FT%	Free throw percentage
RPG	Rebounds per game	APG	Assists per game	SPG	Steals per game
BPG	Blocks per game	PPG	Points per game	**Bold**	Career high

=== Regular season ===
Year	Team	GP	MPG	FG%	FT%	RPG	APG	PPG
1950–51	Boston	66	–	.344	.753	**8.5**	**2.6**	**9.3**
1951–52	Boston	66	**29.9**	**.361**	.741	7.6	2.0	8.2
1952–53	Boston	**70**	28.5	.337	.758	6.3	1.6	6.5
1953–54	Boston	**70**	15.7	.299	.672	4.3	1.1	3.3
1954–55	Milwaukee	**70**	25.0	.339	.751	5.5	2.2	8.2
1955–56	St. Louis	35	16.4	.337	.738	3.9	1.7	5.1
1955–56	Fort Wayne	32	17.8	.316	**.776**	3.2	0.9	3.9
Career		409	23.2	.339	.743	5.9	1.8	6.7

=== Playoffs ===
Year	Team	GP	MPG	FG%	FT%	RPG	APG	PPG
1951	Boston	2	–	.339	.400	**6.5**	1.5	5.0
1952	Boston	3	**42.7**	.320	**.895**	5.3	1.3	**11.0**
1953	Boston	6	32.5	.396	.815	**6.5**	**2.3**	10.0
1954	Boston	6	18.0	**.500**	.727	5.2	0.7	4.0
1956	Fort Wayne	**9**	6.6	.192	.667	1.9	0.2	1.3
Career		26	20.4	.346	.785	4.5	1.0	5.3

== See also ==
- Basketball in the United States
- Race and ethnicity in the NBA
