= Baltimore Bullets (1944–1954) =

American professional basketball team (1944–1954)

- Founded: 1944; 82 years ago
- Folded: 1954; 72 years ago
- History: Baltimore Bullets (ABL); 1944–1947; Baltimore Bullets (BAA/NBA); 1947–1954
- Arena: Baltimore Coliseum
- Capacity: 4,500
- Location: Baltimore, Maryland
- Team colors
- Championships: 2 ABL: 1946; BAA/NBA: 1948
Home	Away	Third

The Baltimore Bullets were a professional basketball team based in Baltimore. The Bullets competed in the American Basketball League (1944–1947), the Basketball Association of America (1947–1949), and (following the BAA's merger with the National Basketball League) the National Basketball Association (1949–1954). On November 27, 1954, the team folded with a 3–11 record on the season, making the Bullets the last NBA franchise to fold. Out of all defunct NBA teams, the Bullets were members of the association for the longest time and the only defunct team to win a championship.

The Bullets name was revived in 1963, when the former Chicago Zephyrs relocated to Baltimore; even after these Bullets relocated to Washington in 1973, they kept their name for 24 more years until they were renamed the Wizards.

== Franchise history ==
=== ABL (1944–1947) ===
The Baltimore Bullets began play in 1944 as an American Basketball League (ABL) team. The Bullets acquired their name in reference to the Phoenix Shot Tower. In the ABL, Baltimore reached the championship round all three seasons, winning the ABL title in 1946. The Bullets won a division title in 1947, but forfeited that season's championship in favor of playing in the World Professional Basketball Tournament (the Bullets' second appearance in the tournament).

=== BAA/NBA (1947–1954) ===
The Bullets moved to the Basketball Association of America (BAA) in 1947, and won the 1948 championship over the Philadelphia Warriors (now Golden State Warriors). In 1949, the BAA merged with the National Basketball League (NBL), and became the National Basketball Association (NBA). The Bullets struggled on the court after their championship season, and never posted another winning record. In 1954, Ray Felix won the NBA Rookie of the Year Award and became the second African-American to be named an All-Star. Felix was traded to the Knicks on September 17, 1954, and on November 27, the Bullets became the last NBA franchise to fold.

== Season-by-season records ==
ABL champions	BAA/NBA champions	Division champions	Playoff berth

Season	League	Division	Finish	Wins	Losses	Win%	GB	Playoffs	Awards
1944–45	ABL	—	4th	14	16	.467	8	Won First Round (Tigers) 2–1; Lost ABL Championship (SPHAs) 1–2	
1945–46	ABL	—	T-1st	21	13	.618	—	Won Tiebreaker (SPHAs) 1–0; Won First Round (Gothams) 2–0; Won ABL Championship (SPHAs) 3–1	
1946–47	ABL	Southern	1st	31	3	.912	—	Won First Round (Gothams) 2–1; Forfeited (Note: After delays, the Bullets refused to wait for the ABL Championship to get underway and decided to play in the World Basketball Tournament; the ABL declared Trenton the champions, but Baltimore claimed the title as its own on the basis of its overwhelming regular season record.) ABL Championship (Tigers)	
1947–48	BAA	Western	2nd	28	20	.583	1	Won Division Tiebreaker (Stags) 1–0; Won First Round (Knicks) 2–1; Won BAA Semifinals (Stags) 2–0; Won BAA Finals (Warriors) 4–2	
1948–49	BAA	Eastern	3rd	29	31	.483	9	Lost Division Semifinals (Knicks) 1–2	
1949–50	NBA	Eastern	5th	25	43	.368	26		
1950–51	NBA	Eastern	5th	24	42	.364	16		
1951–52	NBA	Eastern	5th	20	46	.303	20		
1952–53	NBA	Eastern	4th	16	54	.229	31	Lost Division Semifinals (Knicks) 0–2	
1953–54	NBA	Eastern	5th	16	56	.222	28		Ray Felix (ROY)
1954–55	NBA	Eastern	N/A (Note: The Bullets folded during the season on November 27, 1954. Official records for the 1954–55 NBA season do not include the Bullets' games and team statistics, nor do they include the statistics of opposing players and teams in games played against the Bullets.)	3	11	.214	N/A		

== List of notable personnel ==
=== Players ===
- John Abramovic
- Don Barksdale
- Walt Budko
- Bill Calhoun
- Ray Ellefson
- Ray Felix
- Barney Goldberg
- Paul Gordon
- Billy Hassett
- Paul Hoffman
- Bob Houbregs
- Buddy Jeannette
- Herman Klotz
- Jim Luisi
- Ray Lumpp
- John Mandic
- Eddie Miller
- Ken Murray
- Bob Peterson
- Don Rehfeldt
- Chick Reiser
- Red Rocha
- Kenny Sailors
- Fred Scolari
- Paul Seymour
- Dick Triptow
- Hal Uplinger
- Mark Workman

=== Coaches ===
- Ben Kramer
- Red Rosan
- Buddy Jeannette
- Walt Budko
- Fred Scolari
- Chick Reiser
- Clair Bee
- Albert Barthelme

=== Basketball Hall of Fame members ===
Baltimore Bullets Hall of Famers
Players
No.	Name	Position	Tenure	Inducted
26; 6; 14	Buddy Jeannette^{1}	G	1946–1950	1994
Coaches
Name		Position	Tenure	Inducted
Clair Bee		Head coach	1952–1954	1968

Notes:

- ^{1} He also coached the team in 1946–1951

== Draft ==
Year	Lg	Player	College
1954	NBA	Frank Selvy	Furman University
1954	NBA	Slick Leonard	Indiana University
1954	NBA	Werner Killen	Lawrence Institute of Technology
1954	NBA	Burt Spice	University of Toledo
1954	NBA	Lou Scott	Indiana University
1954	NBA	Bob Heim	Xavier University
1954	NBA	Joe Pehanick	Seattle University
1954	NBA	Harry Brooks	Seton Hall University
1954	NBA	Ron Goerrs	Concord College
1954	NBA	Gary Shivers	University of Houston
1954	NBA	Elliot Karver	George Washington University
1953	NBA	Ray Felix	Long Island University
1953	NBA	Jack Carby	Kansas State University
1953	NBA	Bob Emmercik	Clarion University of Pennsylvania
1953	NBA	Russ Johnson	
1953	NBA	Bob Kraback	
1953	NBA	Dennis Murphy	Georgetown University
1953	NBA	Paul Nolen	Texas Tech University
1953	NBA	Bob Peterson	University of Oregon
1953	NBA	Joe Piorkowski	
1953	NBA	Connie Rea	Centenary College of Louisiana
1953	NBA	Bill Schyman	DePaul University
1953	NBA	Herman Sledzik	Pennsylvania State University
1953	NBA	Bob Speight	North Carolina State University
1953	NBA	Don Stemmerich	
1953	NBA	Elmer Tolson	Eastern Kentucky University
1953	NBA	Edward Walsh	
1952	NBA	Jim Baechtold	Eastern Kentucky University
1952	NBA	Blaine Denning	Lawrence Institute of Technology
1952	NBA	Chuck Grigsby	University of Dayton
1952	NBA	Frank Guisness	University of Washington
1952	NBA	Bill Lea	Missouri State University
1952	NBA	Mike Magula	Youngstown State University
1952	NBA	Bud Penwell	Oklahoma City University
1952	NBA	Bob Peterson	University of Oregon
1952	NBA	Art Press	Western Maryland College
1952	NBA	Bob Priddy	New Mexico State University
1952	NBA	Benny Purcell	Murray State University
1952	NBA	Jim Walsh	Stanford University
1951	NBA	Gene Melchiorre	Bradley University
1951	NBA	Jack Stone	Kansas State University
1951	NBA	Bill Mann	Bradley University
1951	NBA	Bill Hagler	University of California
1951	NBA	Leroy Ishman	American University
1951	NBA	Glen Duggins	University of Utah
1951	NBA	Tom Riach	University of Southern California
1951	NBA	Bill Harper	Oregon State University
1951	NBA	Bob Crowe	San Jose State University
1951	NBA	Dan Torrey	Oregon State University
1951	NBA	Clem Pavilonis	DePaul University
1951	NBA	John Burke	Springfield College
1950	NBA	Don Rehfeldt	University of Wisconsin
1950	NBA	John Pilch	University of Wyoming
1950	NBA	Dick Dickey	North Carolina State University
1950	NBA	Jerry Reed	University of Wyoming
1950	NBA	Norm Mager	City College of New York
1950	NBA	Rick Harman	Kansas State University
1950	NBA	Frank Comerford	La Salle University
1950	NBA	George Bush	University of Toledo
1950	NBA	Jack Laub	University of Cincinnati
1950	NBA	Mike Zedalis	Loyola College in Maryland
1949	BAA	Ron Livingstone	University of Wyoming
1949	BAA	Paul Gordon	University of Notre Dame
1949	BAA	Bill Evans	Drake University
1949	BAA	Tom Gallagher	St. Francis College
1949	BAA	Jim McMullen	Xavier University
1949	BAA	Eppa Rixey	Kenyon College
1949	BAA	Roger Wiley	University of Oregon
1949	BAA	Bill Zipple	Lafayette College
1948	BAA	Walt Budko	Columbia University
1948	BAA	Jim Black	Occidental College
1948	BAA	Darrell Brown	Humboldt State University
1948	BAA	Robert Carroll	West Virginia University
1948	BAA	Jake Carter	East Texas State University
1948	BAA	Marvin English	Newberry College
1948	BAA	Gene Fellmoth	Wittenberg University
1948	BAA	J.W. Fullerton	Arkansas State University
1948	BAA	Marshall Gemberling	Lebanon Valley College
1948	BAA	Vince Hansen	Washington State University
1948	BAA	Joe Holland	University of Kentucky
1948	BAA	Wayne Jones	American International College
1948	BAA	Dan Kraus	Georgetown University
1948	BAA	Herb Krautblatt	Rider University
1948	BAA	Paul Marcincin	Moravian College
1947	BAA	Larry Killick	University of Vermont
1947	BAA	Robert Bolyard	University of Toledo
1947	BAA	Elmer Gainer	DePaul University
1947	BAA	Harry Gallatin	Truman State University
1947	BAA	Scotty Hamilton	West Virginia University
1947	BAA	Hugh Hampton	High Point University
1947	BAA	Bob Jake	University of Vermont
1947	BAA	Charles Raynor	University of Houston
1947	BAA	Chick Reiser	New York University
1947	BAA	John Rusinko	Pennsylvania State University

Preceded by Philadelphia Sphas (1945)	ABL champions Baltimore Bullets; 1945–46, 1946–47‡	Succeeded by Trenton Tigers (1947)‡ Wilkes-Barre Barons (1948)
Preceded by Philadelphia Warriors; 1947	BAA champions Baltimore Bullets; 1947–48	Succeeded by Minneapolis Lakers; 1949, 1950 (NBA)
