= 1952 NBA Finals =

1952 basketball championship series

| Team | Coach | Wins |
|---|---|---|
| Minneapolis Lakers | John Kundla | 4 |
| New York Knickerbockers | Joe Lapchick | 3 |
- Dates: April 12–25
- Hall of Famers: Lakers: George Mikan (1959); Jim Pollard (1978); Slater Martin (1982); Vern Mikkelsen (1995); Knickerbockers: Harry Gallatin (1991); Al McGuire (1992, coach); Dick McGuire (1993); Nat Clifton (2014); Coaches: Joe Lapchick (1966, player); John Kundla (1995)
- Eastern finals: Knickerbockers defeated Nationals, 3–1
- Western finals: Lakers defeated Royals, 3–1

The 1952 NBA World Championship Series was the championship round of the 1952 NBA playoffs, which concluded the National Basketball Association (NBA)'s 1951–52 season. The Western Division champion Minneapolis Lakers faced the Eastern Division champion New York Knickerbockers in a best-of-seven series with Minneapolis having home-court advantage.

Minneapolis won game one and the teams thereafter alternated victories, Minneapolis winning the decisive game by a 17-point margin at home on Friday, April 25.

All but Game 7 were played in the teams' secondary arenas: the Lakers played at the Saint Paul Auditorium, while the Barnum circus bumped the Knickerbockers from Madison Square Garden to the 69th Regiment Armory.

The seven games were played in fourteen days, beginning Saturday and Sunday, April 12 and 13, in Minneapolis/St. Paul and returning to Minneapolis/St. Paul for games five and seven on the following Saturday and Friday. Meanwhile, three Wednesday or Friday games were played in New York City. The entire postseason tournament spanned 39 days in which Minneapolis played 13 games and New York 14.

== Series summary ==
| Game | Date | Home team | Result | Road team |
|---|---|---|---|---|
| Game 1 | April 12 | Minneapolis Lakers | 83–79 (OT) (1–0) | New York Knickerbockers |
| Game 2 | April 13 | Minneapolis Lakers | 72–80 (1–1) | New York Knickerbockers |
| Game 3 | April 16 | New York Knickerbockers | 77–82 (1–2) | Minneapolis Lakers |
| Game 4 | April 18 | New York Knickerbockers | 90–89 (OT) (2–2) | Minneapolis Lakers |
| Game 5 | April 20 | Minneapolis Lakers | 102–89 (3–2) | New York Knickerbockers |
| Game 6 | April 23 | New York Knickerbockers | 76–68 (3–3) | Minneapolis Lakers |
| Game 7 | April 25 | Minneapolis Lakers | 82–65 (4–3) | New York Knickerbockers |

Lakers win series 4–3

== Team rosters ==
=== Minneapolis Lakers ===
1951–52 Minneapolis Lakers roster
Players

| Pos. | No. | Player | Height | Weight | DOB | From |
|---|---|---|---|---|---|---|
| SG | 16 | Bob Harrison | 6 ft 1 in (1.85 m) | 190 lb (86 kg) | August 12, 1927 | Michigan |
| PF | 11 | Lew Hitch | 6 ft 8 in (2.03 m) | 200 lb (91 kg) | July 16, 1929 | Kansas State |
| SG | 4, 15 | Joe Hutton | 6 ft 1 in (1.85 m) | 170 lb (77 kg) | October 6, 1928 | Hamline |
| PG | 22 | Slater Martin | 5 ft 10 in (1.78 m) | 170 lb (77 kg) | October 22, 1925 | Texas |
| C | 99 | George Mikan | 6 ft 10 in (2.08 m) | 245 lb (111 kg) | June 18, 1924 | DePaul |
| PF | 19 | Vern Mikkelsen | 6 ft 7 in (2.01 m) | 230 lb (104 kg) | October 21, 1928 | Hamline |
| SF | 17 | Jim Pollard | 6 ft 4 in (1.93 m) | 185 lb (84 kg) | July 9, 1922 | Stanford |
| SG | 18 | Pep Saul | 6 ft 2 in (1.88 m) | 185 lb (84 kg) | February 16, 1924 | Seton Hall |
| PF | 12 | Howie Schultz | 6 ft 6 in (1.98 m) | 200 lb (91 kg) | July 3, 1922 | Hamline |

Coaches
Head coach
- John Kundla

Legend
- (DP) Unsigned draft pick
- (FA) Free agent
- (S) Suspended
- Injured

Roster

=== New York Knickerbockers ===
1951–52 New York Knicks roster
Players

| Pos. | No. | Player | Height | Weight | DOB | From |
|---|---|---|---|---|---|---|
| SF | 12 | Vince Boryla | 6 ft 5 in (1.96 m) | 210 lb (95 kg) | 1927-03-11 | Denver |
| PF | 8 | Nat Clifton | 6 ft 6 in (1.98 m) | 220 lb (100 kg) | 1922-10-13 | Xavier (LA) |
| PF | 11 | Harry Gallatin | 6 ft 6 in (1.98 m) | 210 lb (95 kg) | 1927-04-26 | Truman State |
| SF | 6, 17 | George Kaftan | 6 ft 3 in (1.91 m) | 190 lb (86 kg) | 1928-02-22 | Holy Cross |
| SG | 7 | Ray Lumpp | 6 ft 1 in (1.85 m) | 178 lb (81 kg) | 1923-07-11 | NYU |
| PG | 3, 16 | Al McGuire | 6 ft 2 in (1.88 m) | 180 lb (82 kg) | 1928-09-07 | St. John's |
| PG | 15 | Dick McGuire | 6 ft 0 in (1.83 m) | 180 lb (82 kg) | 1926-01-25 | St. John's |
| C | 19, 22 | Herb Scherer | 6 ft 9 in (2.06 m) | 212 lb (96 kg) | 1928-12-21 | Long Island |
| C | 18 | Connie Simmons | 6 ft 8 in (2.03 m) | 222 lb (101 kg) | 1925-03-15 | Flushing High School |
| SF | 9 | Ernie Vandeweghe | 6 ft 3 in (1.91 m) | 195 lb (88 kg) | 1928-09-12 | Colgate |
| SG | 10 | Max Zaslofsky | 6 ft 2 in (1.88 m) | 170 lb (77 kg) | 1925-12-07 | St. John's |

Coaches
Head coach
- Joe Lapchick

Legend
- (DP) Unsigned draft pick
- (FA) Free agent
- (S) Suspended
- Injured

Roster

== Game summaries ==
April 12

Boxscore

New York Knickerbockers 79, Minneapolis Lakers 83 (OT)
Scoring by quarter: 18–21, 14–19, 27–20, 12–11, Overtime: 8–12
| Pts: Simmons, McGuire 15 each Rebs: Nat Clifton 12; Asts: Dick McGuire 5 | Pts: Jim Pollard 34; Rebs: George Mikan 16; Asts: Pollard, Mikan 4 each |
Minneapolis leads series, 1–0

St. Paul Auditorium, Saint Paul, Minnesota
Attendance: 8,722
Referees: Sid Borgia, Stan Stutz

April 13

Boxscore

New York Knickerbockers 80, Minneapolis Lakers 72
Scoring by quarter: 11–17, 30–14, 20–20, 19–21
| Pts: Harry Gallatin 18; Rebs: Harry Gallatin 11; Asts: Dick McGuire 5 | Pts: George Mikan 18; Rebs: George Mikan 21; Asts: Slater Martin 4 |
Series tied, 1–1

St. Paul Auditorium, Saint Paul, Minnesota
Referees: Sid Borgia, Stan Stutz

April 16

Boxscore

Minneapolis Lakers 82, New York Knickerbockers 77
Scoring by quarter: 19–20, 22–26, 19–16, 22–15
| Pts: George Mikan 26; Rebs: George Mikan 17; Asts: Pep Saul 8 | Pts: Max Zaslofsky 17; Rebs: Nat Clifton 10; Asts: Dick McGuire 10 |
Minneapolis leads series, 2–1

69th Regiment Armory, Manhattan, New York
Attendance: 4,500

April 18

Boxscore

Minneapolis Lakers 89, New York Knickerbockers 90 (OT)
Scoring by quarter: 21–23, 21–18, 20–16, 15–20, Overtime: 12–13
| Pts: Slater Martin 32; Rebs: George Mikan 17; Asts: Pep Saul 5 | Pts: Connie Simmons 30; Rebs: Nat Clifton 12; Asts: Dick McGuire 6 |
Series tied, 2–2

69th Regiment Armory, Manhattan, New York
Attendance: 5,200
Referees: Sid Borgia, Stan Stutz

April 20

Boxscore

New York Knickerbockers 89, Minneapolis Lakers 102
Scoring by quarter: 26–33, 22–16, 17–28, 24–25
| Pts: Nat Clifton 17; Rebs: Clifton, Gallatin 8 each Asts: six players 1 each | Pts: Mikkelsen, Mikan 32 each Rebs: George Mikan 17; Asts: Pep Saul 5 |
Minneapolis leads series, 3–2

St. Paul Auditorium, Saint Paul, Minnesota
Attendance: 7,244
Referees: Sid Borgia, Stan Stutz

April 23

Boxscore

Minneapolis Lakers 68, New York Knickerbockers 76
Scoring by quarter: 20–24, 13–11, 19–17, 16–24
| Pts: George Mikan 28; Rebs: George Mikan 15; Asts: Slater Martin 9 | Pts: Max Zaslofsky 23; Rebs: Harry Gallatin 13; Asts: Ernie Vandeweghe 7 |
Series tied, 3–3

69th Regiment Armory, Manhattan, New York
Attendance: 3,000

April 25

Boxscore

New York Knickerbockers 65, Minneapolis Lakers 82
Scoring by quarter: 12–18, 17–18, 8–13, 28–33
| Pts: Max Zaslofsky 21; Rebs: Nat Clifton 10; Asts: Nat Clifton 3 | Pts: George Mikan 22; Rebs: George Mikan 19; Asts: Slater Martin 6 |
Minneapolis wins series, 4–3

Minneapolis Auditorium, Minneapolis, Minnesota
Attendance: 8,612
Referees: Sid Borgia, Stan Stutz

This was the first playoff meeting between these two teams.
