= Ralph O'Brien =

American basketball player (1928–2018)

Personal information
- Born: April 8, 1928 Henshaw, Kentucky, U.S.
- Died: August 22, 2018 (aged 90) Clearwater Beach, Florida, U.S.
- Listed height: 5 ft 9 in (1.75 m)
- Listed weight: 160 lb (73 kg)

Career information
- High school: George Washington (Indianapolis, Indiana)
- College: Butler (1946–1950)
- NBA draft: 1950: 6th round, 68th overall pick
- Drafted by: Indianapolis Olympians
- Playing career: 1951–1953
- Position: Point guard
- Number: 6, 20

Career history
- 1950-1951: Grand Rapids Hornets
- 1951: Waterloo Hawks
- 1951–1952: Indianapolis Olympians
- 1952–1953: Baltimore Bullets

Career highlights
- 4× First-team All-MAC (1947–1950)

Career NBA statistics
- Points: 848 (7.1 ppg)
- Rebounds: 192 (1.6 rpg)
- Assists: 180 (1.5 apg)
- Stats at NBA.com
- Stats at Basketball Reference

Ralph E. "Buckshot" O'Brien (April 8, 1928 – August 22, 2018) was an American professional basketball player.

A 5'9" point guard from Butler University, O'Brien played two seasons (1951–1953) in the National Basketball Association (NBA) as a member of the Indianapolis Olympians and Baltimore Bullets. He averaged 7.1 points per game in his NBA career.

O'Brien was the last Butler product to appear in an NBA game for more than a half-century, before the 2010 arrival of Gordon Hayward.

== Career statistics ==
Legend
GP	Games played	GS	Games started	MPG	Minutes per game
FG%	Field goal percentage	3P%	3-point field goal percentage	FT%	Free throw percentage
RPG	Rebounds per game	APG	Assists per game	SPG	Steals per game
BPG	Blocks per game	PPG	Points per game	**Bold**	Career high

=== NBA ===
==== Regular season ====
Year	Team	GP	MPG	FG%	FT%	RPG	APG	PPG
1951–52	Indianapolis	**64**	**24.6**	.372	.819	**1.9**	**1.9**	**9.0**
1952–53	Indianapolis	34	15.5	.311	**.877**	1.5	1.0	5.1
1952–53	Fort Wayne	7	7.1	**.417**	.600	.0	.6	3.3
1952–53	Baltimore	14	13.0	.375	.818	1.4	1.2	5.1
Career		199	19.6	.360	.830	1.6	1.5	7.1

==== Playoffs ====
Year	Team	GP	MPG	FG%	FT%	RPG	APG	PPG
1952	Indianapolis	**2**	**24.5**	**.455**	**1.000**	**1.5**	**1.5**	**7.5**
1953	Baltimore	1	18.0	.000	**1.000**	1.0	.0	2.0
Career		3	22.3	.385	1.000	1.3	1.0	5.7

== See also ==
- List of shortest players in National Basketball Association history
