= Arnie Johnson =

American basketball player

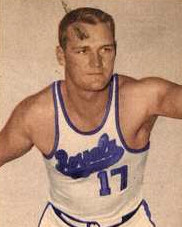
- Johnson with the Rochester Royals in 1948

Personal information
- Born: May 16, 1920 Gonvick, Minnesota, U.S.
- Died: June 6, 2000 (aged 80) Rochester, New York, U.S.
- Listed height: 6 ft 5 in (1.96 m)
- Listed weight: 236 lb (107 kg)

Career information
- High school: Gonvick (Gonvick, Minnesota)
- College: Bemidji State (1938–1942)
- Playing career: 1946–1953
- Position: Small forward
- Number: 17, 12

Career history
- 1946–1953: Rochester Royals

Career highlights
- NBA champion (1951)

Career statistics
- Points: 2,888
- Rebounds: 1,272
- Assists: 731
- Stats at NBA.com
- Stats at Basketball Reference

Arnitz L. Johnson (May 16, 1920 – June 6, 2000) was an American professional basketball player. He played for the Rochester Royals of the National Basketball League (NBL) and National Basketball Association (NBA) from 1946 to 1953. Johnson is the only basketball player from Bemidji State to play in the NBA.

== Early life and college career ==
Johnson was born on May 16, 1920, in Gonvick, Minnesota. His father was an immigrant from Sweden. Johnson attended Gonvick High School, where he served as a captain on the basketball team and was a four-time letterwinner.

Johnson played college basketball for the Bemidji State Beavers (then Bemidji Teachers). He led the team to three consecutive Northern Teachers College Conference championships that led to berths in the NAIA Men's Basketball Championships.

Johnson served at Buckley Air Force Base during World War II and helped wounded soldiers during their rehabilitation.

== Professional career ==
In 1946, Johnson was playing at an Amateur Athletic Union tournament in Denver when he was spotted by Chuck Taylor, who told Rochester Royals coach and owner Les Harrison about Johnson. Harrison sent Johnson money to travel for a tryout with the team. Johnson played seven seasons (1946–1953) in the National Basketball League and National Basketball Association as a member of the Rochester Royals. He averaged 8.7 points and 6.2 rebounds in his career and won a league championship in 1951.

In 2003, Monroe Community College in New York established the Arnold L. Johnson Endowed Memorial Scholarship for student athletes.

== BAA/NBA career statistics ==
Legend
GP	Games played	GS	Games started	MPG	Minutes per game
FG%	Field goal percentage	3P%	3-point field goal percentage	FT%	Free throw percentage
RPG	Rebounds per game	APG	Assists per game	SPG	Steals per game
BPG	Blocks per game	PPG	Points per game	**Bold**	Career high
†	Won an NBA championship

=== Regular season ===
Year	Team	GP	MPG	FG%	FT%	RPG	APG	PPG
1948–49	Rochester	60	–	.416	.701	–	1.3	8.5
1949–50	Rochester	68	–	.396	.680	–	2.1	7.3
1950–51†	Rochester	68	–	**.459**	.725	**6.6**	2.6	9.4
1951–52	Rochester	66	**32.7**	.433	**.778**	6.1	**2.8**	**10.0**
1952–53	Rochester	**70**	28.3	.379	.748	6.0	2.2	8.3
Career		332	30.5	.418	.731	6.2	2.2	8.7

=== Playoffs ===
Year	Team	GP	MPG	FG%	FT%	RPG	APG	PPG
1949	Rochester	4	–	.268	.727	–	1.8	9.5
1950	Rochester	2	–	**.500**	.667	–	2.5	10.0
1951†	Rochester	**14**	–	.449	**.782**	**9.0**	2.9	**11.2**
1952	Rochester	6	27.7	.296	.719	5.2	**4.0**	6.5
1953	Rochester	3	**29.0**	.286	.762	6.0	2.0	8.0
Career		29	28.1	.383	.752	7.6	2.8	9.6
