= Jack Kiley =

American basketball player (1929–1982)

Personal information
- Born: January 5, 1929 Newark, New Jersey, U.S.
- Died: February 16, 1982 (aged 53) Baltimore, Maryland, U.S.
- Listed height: 6 ft 1 in (1.85 m)
- Listed weight: 170 lb (77 kg)

Career information
- High school: Seton Hall Prep (West Orange, New Jersey)
- College: Syracuse (1947–1951)
- NBA draft: 1951: 2nd round, 13th overall pick
- Drafted by: Fort Wayne Pistons
- Playing career: 1951–1952
- Position: Shooting guard
- Number: 11, 10

Career history
- 1951–1952: Fort Wayne Pistons

Career NBA statistics
- Points: 124 (2.3 ppg)
- Rebounds: 51 (1.0 rpg)
- Assists: 65 (1.2 apg)
- Stats at NBA.com
- Stats at Basketball Reference

John Francis Kiley Jr. (January 5, 1929 – February 16, 1982) was an American professional basketball player. Kiley was selected in the 1951 NBA draft by the Fort Wayne Pistons after a collegiate career at Syracuse. He played for the Pistons in 1951–52 and the beginning of 1952–53 and averaged 2.3 points, 1.0 rebounds and 1.2 assists per contest in 53 career games.

Born in Irvington, New Jersey, Kiley played high school basketball at Seton Hall Preparatory School. He worked in pharmaceutical sales for Johnson and Johnson and Becton Industries among other companies, mostly working as a hospital supply official. He ended his career working for the Baltimore Machine and Equipment Company.

== Career statistics ==
Legend
GP	Games played	GS	Games started	MPG	Minutes per game
FG%	Field goal percentage	3P%	3-point field goal percentage	FT%	Free throw percentage
RPG	Rebounds per game	APG	Assists per game	SPG	Steals per game
BPG	Blocks per game	PPG	Points per game	**Bold**	Career high

=== NBA ===
==== Regular season ====
Year	Team	GP	MPG	FG%	FT%	RPG	APG	PPG
1951–52	Fort Wayne	**47**	**10.1**	**.228**	.556	**1.0**	**1.3**	**2.5**
1952–53	Fort Wayne	6	4.5	.200	**1.000**	.3	.5	1.0
Career		53	9.5	.227	.571	1.0	1.2	2.3

==== Playoffs ====
Year	Team	GP	MPG	FG%	FT%	RPG	APG	PPG
1951–52	Fort Wayne	1	2.0	.333	–	.0	1.0	2.0
