= Bill Tosheff =

American basketball player

Personal information
- Born: June 2, 1926 Gary, Indiana, U.S.
- Died: October 1, 2011 (aged 85) Hawaii, U.S.
- Listed height: 6 ft 1 in (1.85 m)
- Listed weight: 175 lb (79 kg)

Career information
- High school: Froebel (Gary, Indiana)
- College: Indiana (1948–1951)
- NBA draft: 1951: 4th round, 32nd overall pick
- Drafted by: Indianapolis Olympians
- Playing career: 1951–1954
- Position: Point guard
- Number: 9

Career history
- 1951–1953: Indianapolis Olympians
- 1953–1954: Milwaukee Hawks

Career NBA statistics
- Points: 1,859 (9.2 ppg)
- Rebounds: 608 (3.0 rpg)
- Assists: 661 (3.3 apg)
- Stats at NBA.com
- Stats at Basketball Reference

William Mark Tosheff (June 2, 1926 – October 1, 2011) was an American professional basketball player.

A 6'1" guard, Tosheff played college basketball for the Indiana Hoosiers from 1947 to 1951 after a stint with the U.S. Army Air Corps. From 1951 to 1954, he played in the National Basketball Association (NBA) as a member of the Indianapolis Olympians and Milwaukee Hawks, averaging 9.2 points in 203 games. Some sources list him as the 1952 NBA Co-Rookie of the Year (with Mel Hutchins); however, official NBA guides generally have not included pre-1953 winners.

In 1988, Tosheff founded the Pre-1965 NBA Players Association in order to secure fair pension plans for NBA players who were active before 1965. Tosheff lobbied to close a loophole in the NBA pension that granted benefits to post-1965 players with a minimum of three years of service, but required pre-1965 players have five years of service.

A San Diego resident, Tosheff died in Hawaii from cancer aged 85 on October 1, 2011.

== Career statistics ==
Legend
GP	Games played	GS	Games started	MPG	Minutes per game
FG%	Field goal percentage	3P%	3-point field goal percentage	FT%	Free throw percentage
RPG	Rebounds per game	APG	Assists per game	SPG	Steals per game
BPG	Blocks per game	PPG	Points per game	**Bold**	Career high

=== NBA ===
==== Regular season ====
Year	Team	GP	MPG	FG%	FT%	RPG	APG	PPG
1951–52	Indianapolis	65	31.6	**.327**	**.824**	3.3	3.4	9.4
1952–53	Indianapolis	67	**36.7**	.323	.806	**3.4**	**3.6**	**11.3**
1953–54	Milwaukee	**71**	25.7	.291	.743	2.3	2.8	6.9
Career		203	31.2	.315	.793	3.0	3.3	9.2

==== Playoffs ====
Year	Team	GP	MPG	FG%	FT%	RPG	APG	PPG
1952	Indianapolis	2	**34.0**	**.111**	**1.000**	**3.0**	**3.5**	3.5
1953	Indianapolis	2	33.0	.063	**1.000**	2.5	2.0	**4.5**
Career		4	33.5	.088	1.000	2.8	2.8	4.0
