= Joe Hutton (basketball) =

American basketball player and coach

Personal information
- Born: October 6, 1928 Excelsior, Minnesota, U.S.
- Died: October 19, 2009 (aged 81) Bloomington, Minnesota, U.S.
- Listed height: 6 ft 1 in (1.85 m)
- Listed weight: 170 lb (77 kg)

Career information
- High school: Wilson (Saint Paul, Minnesota)
- College: Hamline (1946–1950)
- NBA draft: 1950: 7th round, 83rd overall pick
- Drafted by: Minneapolis Lakers
- Playing career: 1950–1952
- Position: Point guard
- Number: 14, 4, 15

Career history
- 1950–1952: Minneapolis Lakers

Career highlights
- NBA champion (1952)

Career statistics
- Points: 302 (2.5 ppg)
- Rebounds: 187 (1.6 rpg)
- Assists: 115 (1.0 apg)
- Stats at NBA.com
- Stats at Basketball Reference

Joseph Warren Hutton Jr. (October 6, 1928 – October 19, 2009) was an American professional basketball player.

A 6'1" guard, Hutton played his college ball at Hamline University, where he was coached by his father, Joe Hutton Sr. Hutton played two seasons in the National Basketball Association as a member of the Minneapolis Lakers. He averaged 2.5 points per game in his career and won a championship in 1952.

He later coached basketball at Minneapolis North High School and Bloomington Lincoln High School.

== Career statistics ==
Legend
GP	Games played	GS	Games started	MPG	Minutes per game
FG%	Field goal percentage	3P%	3-point field goal percentage	FT%	Free throw percentage
RPG	Rebounds per game	APG	Assists per game	SPG	Steals per game
BPG	Blocks per game	PPG	Points per game	**Bold**	Career high
†	Won an NBA championship

=== NBA ===
==== Regular season ====
Year	Team	GP	MPG	FG%	FT%	RPG	APG	PPG
1950–51	Minneapolis	**60**		.328	.674	**1.7**	.9	2.5
1951–52†	Minneapolis	**60**	12.1	**.335**	**.700**	1.4	**1.0**	**2.6**
Career		120	12.1	.331	.690	1.6	1.0	2.5

==== Playoffs ====
Year	Team	GP	MPG	FG%	FT%	RPG	APG	PPG
1950–51	Minneapolis	7		.000	.500	.4	.1	.3
1951–52†	Minneapolis	**12**	11.6	**.414**	**.643**	**1.1**	**1.0**	**2.8**
Career		19	11.6	.375	.611	.8	.7	1.8
