= Frank Saul (basketball) =

American basketball player (1924–2019)

Personal information
- Born: February 16, 1924 Oradell, New Jersey, U.S.
- Died: November 7, 2019 (aged 95) East Hanover, New Jersey, U.S.
- Listed height: 6 ft 2 in (1.88 m)
- Listed weight: 185 lb (84 kg)

Career information
- High school: Holy Trinity (Hackensack, New Jersey); Seton Hall Prep (West Orange, New Jersey)
- College: Seton Hall (1942–1943, 1946–1949)
- BAA draft: 1949: 1st round, 10th overall pick
- Drafted by: Rochester Royals
- Playing career: 1949–1955
- Position: Shooting guard
- Number: 03, 33, 18, 10

Career history
- 1949–1951: Rochester Royals
- 1951–1952: Baltimore Bullets
- 1952–1955: Minneapolis Lakers

Career highlights
- 4× NBA champion (1951–1954); No. 3 retired by Seton Hall Pirates

Career statistics
- Points: 2,152 (5.6 ppg)
- Rebounds: 683 (2.0 rpg)
- Assists: 596 (1.6 apg)
- Stats at NBA.com
- Stats at Basketball Reference

Frank Benjamin "Pep" Saul Jr. (February 16, 1924 – November 7, 2019) was an American professional basketball player. He played in the National Basketball Association (NBA) for the Rochester Royals, Baltimore Bullets and Minneapolis Lakers. Saul won four consecutive NBA championships from 1951 to 1954. He played college basketball for the Seton Hall Pirates and had his number 3 retired by the team.

== Early life ==
Saul was born in Oradell and raised in Westwood, New Jersey, as the eldest of eight children to Frank and Lena Saul. He attended Holy Trinity High School in Hackensack, where he captained the baseball and basketball teams to state championships. He transferred to Seton Hall Preparatory in West Orange for his senior year.

== College basketball career ==
Saul played collegiately for the Seton Hall Pirates men's basketball, leaving college after his freshman year to serve for three years in the United States Army during World War II. He scored his 1,000th career point in a game against Creighton University on March 5, 1949, making him the first player from Seton Hall to reach that milestone.

== Professional career ==
Saul won four consecutive NBA championships with the Rochester Royals in 1951 and with the Minneapolis Lakers from 1952 to 1954. He, Steve Kerr and Patrick McCaw are the only three players in NBA history who won three championships with two different teams in consecutive seasons, with him and Kerr winning four times in a row.

== Later life and death ==
Saul worked in insurance after his athletic retirement. He worked with State Farm and James E. Wordley Agency before he opened his own agency in 1967; he sold his business in 1994.

Saul was married to his wife for 72 years and had eight children. He was a resident of East Hanover, New Jersey. Saul died on November 7, 2019, at the age of 95.

== Career statistics ==
Legend
GP	Games played	GS	Games started	MPG	Minutes per game
FG%	Field goal percentage	3P%	3-point field goal percentage	FT%	Free throw percentage
RPG	Rebounds per game	APG	Assists per game	SPG	Steals per game
BPG	Blocks per game	PPG	Points per game	**Bold**	Career high
†	Won an NBA championship	*	Led the league

=== Playing ===
==== NBA ====
===== Regular season =====
Year	Team	GP	MPG	FG%	FT%	RPG	APG	PPG
1949–50	Rochester	49	–	**.404**	.723	–	.6	3.7
1950–51†	Rochester	63	–	.339	.686	1.3	1.0	4.3
1951–52	Baltimore	39	18.5	.339	**.800**	2.2	2.0	5.6
1951–52†	Minneapolis	25	**30.4**	.389	.763	**3.2**	**2.7**	**8.6**
1952–53†	Minneapolis	70	25.7	.397	.710	2.0	1.6	7.4
1953–54†	Minneapolis	**71**	25.4	.347	.753	2.2	2.0	6.4
1954–55	Milwaukee	65	17.5	.317	.772	2.1	1.6	4.4
Career		384	23.0	.360	.739	2.0	1.6	5.6

===== Playoffs =====
Year	Team	GP	MPG	FG%	FT%	RPG	APG	PPG
1950	Rochester	2	–	**.538**	**.800**	–	2.0	9.0
1951†	Rochester	9	–	.333	.500	.3	.7	1.0
1952†	Minneapolis	**13**	**40.8**	.463	.729	**2.8**	**3.5**	**11.3**
1953†	Minneapolis	12*	24.8	.419	.727	2.3	1.5	7.2
1954†	Minneapolis	**13***	17.5	.353	.735	2.1	1.1	4.7
Career		49	27.7	.428	.730	2.0	1.8	6.6
