= 1951–52 Rochester Royals season =

NBA professional basketball team season

- Division champions
- Head coach: Les Harrison
- Owners: Jack Harrison; Les Harrison
- Arena: Edgerton Park Arena

Results
- Record: 41–25 (.621)
- Place: Division: 1st (Western)
- Playoff finish: West Division Finals (eliminated 1–3)
- Stats at Basketball Reference
- Radio: WHAM

The 1951–52 Rochester Royals season was the Royals fourth season in the NBA. They entered the season as the defending champions, and finished matching their 41 wins from the year prior, though had a better winning percentage due to having two fewer games.

== Regular season ==
=== Season standings ===
Western Division	W	L	PCT	GB	Home	Road	Neutral	Div
x-Rochester Royals	41	25	.621	–	28–5	12–18	1–2	22–14
x-Minneapolis Lakers	40	26	.606	1	21–5	13–20	6–1	24–12
x-Indianapolis Olympians	34	32	.515	7	25–6	4–24	5–2	18–18
x-Fort Wayne Pistons	29	37	.439	12	22–11	6–24	1–2	17–19
Milwaukee Hawks	17	49	.258	24	8–13	3–22	6–14	9–27

x – clinched playoff spot

=== Game log ===
1951–52 Game log
#	Date	Opponent	Score	High points	Record
1	November 1	Baltimore	97–101	Bob Davies (20)	1–0
2	November 3	Minneapolis	93–74	Bob Davies (16)	1–1
3	November 10	Indianapolis	89–100	Bobby Wanzer (22)	2–1
4	November 11	New York	78–80	Arnie Risen (20)	3–1
5	November 13	@ Milwaukee	91–75	Bob Davies (26)	4–1
6	November 17	Philadelphia	72–86	Bob Davies (23)	5–1
7	November 18	@ Fort Wayne	76–71 (OT)	Arnie Risen (17)	6–1
8	November 20	@ Indianapolis	65–69 (2OT)	Davies, Risen (14)	6–2
9	November 22	@ Minneapolis	65–70 (2OT)	Arnie Johnson (16)	6–3
10	November 24	Fort Wayne	63–74	Bobby Wanzer (19)	7–3
11	November 25	@ Milwaukee	73–75	Bobby Wanzer (16)	7–4
12	November 27	Milwaukee	73–77	Jack Coleman (17)	8–4
13	November 29	@ New York	78–74	Bobby Wanzer (25)	9–4
14	December 1	Milwaukee	66–71	Davies, Wanzer (15)	10–4
15	December 2	@ Syracuse	81–79	Bob Davies (24)	11–4
16	December 3	@ Baltimore	77–70	Bob Davies (25)	12–4
17	December 4	@ Philadelphia	80–96	Jack Coleman (15)	12–5
18	December 8	Syracuse	95–75	Arnie Risen (17)	12–6
19	December 9	@ Fort Wayne	84–86	Arnie Risen (25)	12–7
20	December 15	Indianapolis	66–75	Bobby Wanzer (18)	13–7
21	December 16	Baltimore	95–99	Bob Davies (22)	14–7
22	December 18	@ Milwaukee	94–68	Jack Coleman (18)	15–7
23	December 20	@ Fort Wayne	69–54	Davies, Wanzer (15)	16–7
24	December 22	Philadelphia	89–105	Arnie Risen (25)	17–7
25	December 25	Indianapolis	78–87	Jack Coleman (25)	18–7
26	December 27	New York	85–98	Bobby Wanzer (25)	19–7
27	December 29	Fort Wayne	61–75	Jack Coleman (18)	20–7
28	December 31	N Indianapolis	73–77	Bobby Wanzer (17)	20–8
29	January 1	Boston	91–106	Bob Davies (27)	21–8
30	January 5	Philadelphia	94–103	Bob Davies (22)	22–8
31	January 6	@ Boston	80–91	Arnie Johnson (17)	22–9
32	January 8	@ New York	74–107	Arnie Johnson (13)	22–10
33	January 11	@ Philadelphia	83–85	Bob Davies (17)	22–11
34	January 12	Fort Wayne	88–76	Arnie Risen (14)	22–12
35	January 13	New York	70–97	Bob Davies (19)	23–12
36	January 19	Minneapolis	85–96	Bob Davies (28)	24–12
37	January 20	@ Minneapolis	81–91 (2OT)	Bob Davies (21)	24–13
38	January 21	N Milwaukee	78–76	Arnie Risen (23)	25–13
39	January 22	@ Indianapolis	65–68	Bobby Wanzer (18)	25–14
40	January 24	@ Fort Wayne	90–94	Arnie Risen (26)	25–15
41	January 26	Fort Wayne	71–104	Bobby Wanzer (25)	26–15
42	January 27	Indianapolis	95–102	Arnie Risen (28)	27–15
43	February 2	Milwaukee	79–100	Bobby Wanzer (26)	28–15
44	February 3	@ Minneapolis	75–77	Arnie Risen (19)	28–16
45	February 7	@ Minneapolis	75–86	Bobby Wanzer (16)	28–17
46	February 9	Boston	100–104	Bob Davies (22)	29–17
47	February 10	@ Boston	111–97	Bobby Wanzer (26)	30–17
48	February 12	@ Philadelphia	86–75	Bob Davies (22)	31–17
49	February 13	@ Baltimore	91–96	Bob Davies (17)	31–18
50	February 14	@ Syracuse	78–76	Bob Davies (17)	32–18
51	February 16	Syracuse	84–92	Arnie Risen (28)	33–18
52	February 17	Indianapolis	92–100	Arnie Risen (23)	34–18
53	February 23	Minneapolis	83–73	Arnie Risen (24)	34–19
54	February 24	Baltimore	100–124	Jack Coleman (27)	35–19
55	February 26	Milwaukee	67–99	Bobby Wanzer (19)	36–19
56	February 28	N Boston	72–91	Arnie Risen (17)	36–20
57	March 1	Syracuse	83–98	Bobby Wanzer (22)	37–20
58	March 2	@ Syracuse	72–76	Bob Davies (18)	37–21
59	March 3	@ Baltimore	96–99	Bob Davies (33)	37–22
60	March 4	@ New York	90–92 (OT)	Bob Davies (26)	37–23
61	March 6	Milwaukee	74–77	Arnie Risen (24)	38–23
62	March 8	Minneapolis	92–94 (OT)	Bob Davies (18)	39–23
63	March 9	@ Minneapolis	90–96	Arnie Risen (28)	39–24
64	March 11	@ Indianapolis	82–81	Arnie Risen (30)	40–24
65	March 13	@ Fort Wayne	86–84	Bobby Wanzer (17)	41–24
66	March 15	Boston	118–106	Bobby Wanzer (24)	41–25

== Playoffs ==
1952 playoff game log
Division Semifinals: 2–0 (home: 1–0; road: 1–0)

Game	Date	Team	Score	High points	Location	Series
1	March 18	Fort Wayne	W 95–78	Bobby Wanzer (26)	Edgerton Park Arena	1–0
2	March 20	@ Fort Wayne	W 92–86	Bob Davies (29)	North Side High School Gym	2–0

Division Finals: 1–3 (home: 1–1; road: 0–2)

Game	Date	Team	Score	High points	Location	Series
1	March 29	Minneapolis	W 88–78	Bob Davies (26)	Edgerton Park Arena	1–0
2	March 30	Minneapolis	L 78–83 (OT)	Vern Mikkelsen (19)	Edgerton Park Arena	1–1
3	April 5	@ Minneapolis	L 67–77	Jim Pollard (22)	Minneapolis Auditorium	1–2
4	April 6	@ Minneapolis	L 80–82	Bob Davies (21)	Minneapolis Auditorium	1–3

1952 schedule

== Awards and records ==
- Bob Davies, All-NBA First Team
- Bobby Wanzer, All-NBA Second Team
