= 1951–52 Indianapolis Olympians season =

- Head coach: Herm Schaefer
- Arena: Hinkle Fieldhouse

Results
- Record: 34–32 (.515)
- Place: Division: 3rd (Western)
- Playoff finish: West Division Semifinals (eliminated 0-2)
- Stats at Basketball Reference
- Radio: WXLW

The 1951–52 Indianapolis Olympians season was the Olympians' 3rd season in the NBA. On October 20, weeks before the start of the regular season period, it was revealed that two of the Olympians' All-Star players from the previous season, Ralph Beard and Alex Groza, were both previously involved in the CCNY point-shaving scandal similar to former Baltimore Bullets rookie Norm Mager from the previous season, as they were arrested that day for their involvement in that scandal as collegiate players alongside former University of Kentucky player Dale Barnstable. Both Beard and Groza would end up getting permanent bans from the NBA alongside Mager and every other college player involved with the scandal. Despite the sudden breakdown from within, however, the Olympians would still not only make it to the 1952 NBA playoffs, but do so with a better record than they had the previous season.

== Draft picks ==
Round	Pick	Player	Position	Nationality	College

== Regular season ==
=== Season standings ===
Western Division	W	L	PCT	GB	Home	Road	Neutral	Div
x-Rochester Royals	41	25	.621	–	28–5	12–18	1–2	22–14
x-Minneapolis Lakers	40	26	.606	1	21–5	13–20	6–1	24–12
x-Indianapolis Olympians	34	32	.515	7	25–6	4–24	5–2	18–18
x-Fort Wayne Pistons	29	37	.439	12	22–11	6–24	1–2	17–19
Milwaukee Hawks	17	49	.258	24	8–13	3–22	6–14	9–27

=== Game log ===
1951–52 Game log
#	Date	Opponent	Score	High points	Record
1	November 3	@ Baltimore	90–86	Bill Tosheff (23)	1–0
2	November 4	@ Boston	65–97	Bill Tosheff (16)	1–1
3	November 6	New York	83–73	Ralph O'Brien (23)	1–2
4	November 9	Fort Wayne	77–92	Ralph O'Brien (15)	2–2
5	November 10	@ Rochester	89–100	Paul Walther (16)	2–3
6	November 11	@ Syracuse	79–93	Joe Graboski (15)	2–4
7	November 13	Minneapolis	77–71	Leo Barnhorst (18)	2–5
8	November 16	Milwaukee	78–68	Joe Graboski (22)	2–6
9	November 17	vs. Milwaukee	58–68	Paul Walther (20)	3–6
10	November 20	Rochester	65–69	Lavoy, Walther (15)	4–6
11	November 23	Syracuse	68–82	Leo Barnhorst (17)	5–6
12	November 25	@ Minneapolis	73–82	Leo Barnhorst (15)	5–7
13	November 30	Boston	87–92	Paul Walther (26)	6–7
14	December 2	@ Milwaukee	80–71	Paul Walther (15)	7–7
15	December 4	Syracuse	77–83	Joe Graboski (21)	8–7
16	December 7	Baltimore	80–88	Joe Graboski (18)	9–7
17	December 9	@ Minneapolis	85–78	Tosheff, Walther (19)	10–7
18	December 11	Minneapolis	69–85	Leo Barnhorst (25)	11–7
19	December 14	New York	79–83	Joe Graboski (18)	12–7
20	December 15	@ Rochester	66–75	Paul Walther (14)	12–8
21	December 16	@ Syracuse	96–92	Paul Walther (23)	13–8
22	December 21	Milwaukee	64–69	Leo Barnhorst (16)	14–8
23	December 23	@ Boston	88–91 (OT)	Paul Walther (22)	14–9
24	December 25	@ Rochester	78–87	Bill Tosheff (16)	14–10
25	December 29	@ Baltimore	65–75	Bill Tosheff (14)	14–11
26	December 31	vs. Rochester	73–77	Bill Tosheff (17)	15–11
27	January 4	New York	73–83	Joe Graboski (21)	16–11
28	January 5	vs. Minneapolis	86–65	Joe Graboski (13)	16–12
29	January 6	@ Fort Wayne	75–79	Leo Barnhorst (16)	16–13
30	January 8	Minneapolis	75–82	Joe Graboski (23)	17–13
31	January 9	@ Minneapolis	74–91	Don Lofgran (17)	17–14
32	January 11	Boston	79–100	Leo Barnhorst (28)	18–14
33	January 12	@ New York	77–86	Ralph O'Brien (17)	18–15
34	January 13	@ Syracuse	85–103	Leo Barnhorst (17)	18–16
35	January 15	Philadelphia	68–101	Ralph O'Brien (26)	19–16
36	January 18	@ Philadelphia	83–98	Don Lofgran (16)	19–17
37	January 19	@ Baltimore	78–81	Don Lofgran (15)	19–18
38	January 20	@ Boston	98–117	Wallace Jones (22)	19–19
39	January 22	Rochester	65–68	Joe Graboski (25)	20–19
40	January 25	Fort Wayne	79–83 (OT)	Bob Lavoy (22)	21–19
41	January 26	@ New York	93–99	Don Lofgran (21)	21–20
42	January 27	@ Rochester	95–102	Ralph O'Brien (22)	21–21
43	January 29	vs. New York	72–100	Joe Graboski (33)	22–21
44	January 30	Fort Wayne	81–77	Graboski, Lofgran (16)	22–22
45	February 1	Minneapolis	77–85	Leo Barnhorst (20)	23–22
46	February 3	@ Fort Wayne	70–85	Ralph O'Brien (14)	23–23
47	February 5	Philadelphia	85–94	Bob Lavoy (31)	24–23
48	February 8	Milwaukee	76–80	Leo Barnhorst (20)	25–23
49	February 9	@ Milwaukee	83–90	Bill Tosheff (18)	25–24
50	February 12	Fort Wayne	78–80	Bob Lavoy (18)	26–24
51	February 14	Baltimore	66–89	Bob Lavoy (13)	27–24
52	February 15	@ Philadelphia	91–112	Joe Graboski (15)	27–25
53	February 17	@ Rochester	92–100	Graboski, Lavoy (17)	27–26
54	February 19	Boston	81–82	Joe Graboski (27)	28–26
55	February 20	vs. Milwaukee	80–95	Joe Graboski (27)	29–26
56	February 22	Milwaukee	73–82	Don Lofgran (20)	30–26
57	February 23	vs. Milwaukee	59–86	Paul Walther (19)	31–26
58	February 26	Philadelphia	88–86	Leo Barnhorst (24)	31–27
59	February 27	@ Philadelphia	89–97	Leo Barnhorst (21)	31–28
60	March 1	vs. Minneapolis	98–88	Paul Walther (16)	31–29
61	March 2	@ Fort Wayne	88–101	Joe Graboski (27)	31–30
62	March 4	Fort Wayne	68–86	Paul Walther (21)	32–30
63	March 7	Syracuse	76–81	Joe Graboski (16)	33–30
64	March 11	Rochester	82–81	Joe Graboski (18)	33–31
65	March 14	Baltimore	87–103	Paul Walther (18)	34–31
66	March 16	@ Fort Wayne	92–111	Don Lofgran (21)	34–32
