= Jim Pollard =

American basketball player and coach

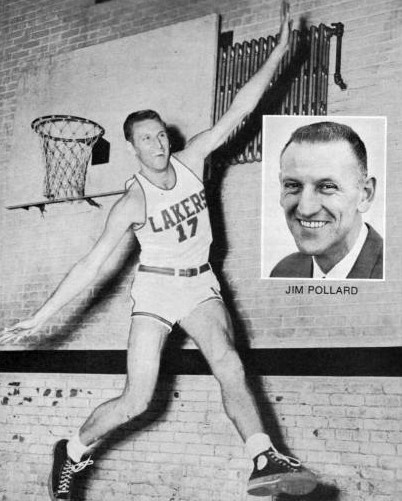

Personal information
- Born: July 9, 1922 Oakland, California, U.S.
- Died: January 22, 1993 (aged 70) Stockton, California, U.S.
- Listed height: 6 ft 3 in (1.91 m)
- Listed weight: 185 lb (84 kg)

Career information
- High school: Oakland Tech (Oakland, California)
- College: Stanford (1940–1942)
- BAA draft: 1947: 7th round, 62nd overall pick
- Drafted by: Chicago Stags
- Playing career: 1947–1955
- Position: Small forward
- Number: 17

Career history

Playing
- 1947–1955: Minneapolis Lakers

Career highlights
- 5× BAA/NBA champion (1949, 1950, 1952–1954); 4× NBA All-Star (1951, 1952, 1954, 1955); 2× All-NBA First Team (1949, 1950); 2× All-NBA Second Team (1952, 1954); No. 17 honored by Los Angeles Lakers; ABA All-Star Game head coach (1968); NBL champion (1948); All-NBL First Team (1948); NCAA champion (1942); First-team All-American – Helms (1942); First-team All-PCC (1942); California Mr. Basketball (1939)

Career BAA and NBA statistics
- Points: 5,762 (13.2 ppg)
- Rebounds: 2,487 (7.8 rpg)
- Assists: 1,417 (3.2 apg)
- Stats at NBA.com
- Stats at Basketball Reference
- Basketball Hall of Fame
- Collegiate Basketball Hall of Fame

James Clifford Pollard (July 9, 1922 – January 22, 1993) was an American professional basketball player and coach. As a player in the National Basketball Association (NBA), Pollard was considered one of the best forwards in the 1950s and was known for his leaping ability, earning him the nickname "The Kangaroo Kid". A five-time NBA champion and four-time NBA All-Star, Pollard spent his entire eight-year professional career with the Minneapolis Lakers.

Pollard was inducted into the Naismith Memorial Basketball Hall of Fame in 1978. He has also been inducted into the Bay Area Hall of Fame, Stanford Hall of Fame, and Pac-12 Hall of Honor.

== Early life ==
Pollard attended Oakland Technical High School in his hometown of Oakland, California. He led the school's basketball team to three consecutive conference titles from 1937–38 to 1939–40. He averaged 19.8 points per game in his senior year, setting a school record.

== College career and military service ==
Pollard was recruited to Stanford University by former Stanford star and future Hall of Famer, Hank Luisetti. Pollard played for the Stanford Indians for two seasons, under head coach Everett Dean. During his sophomore season, he was a key member of the team's 1942 national championship team, but, due to illness, he did not play in the championship game. At Stanford, Pollard joined the Sigma Rho chapter of Delta Kappa Epsilon fraternity.

Pollard's college career was ended early due to World War II, and he served with the United States Coast Guard from 1942 to 1946. During his service, he starred with the Coast Guard basketball team in Alameda, winning a Northern California title in 1943 and the Service League championship in 1946.

Pollard went on to graduate from the University of Minnesota in 1954.

== Amateur career ==
After World War II, Pollard played amateur basketball for one season with the San Diego Dons of the Amateur Athletic Union. The following season, he played for the Oakland Bittners in the same league. He led the AAU in scoring and earned Most Valuable Player honors both years. His teams were runners-up in the national AAU tournament both seasons.

Pollard also played amateur baseball for Jordan, Minnesota's Town Team baseball club, during his NBA career. He was reputed to be "a good pitcher and a powerful hitter." It was there that Pollard famously "hit a ball that didn't stop until it got to Chicago", because it landed in a gondola car in a freight train passing by the ballpark.

== Professional career ==
Pollard began his professional basketball career in 1947 after signing with the Minneapolis Lakers while the team was a part of the National Basketball League. On the team, Pollard was a member of a future Hall of Fame frontcourt alongside center George Mikan and power forward Vern Mikkelsen, as well as fellow Hall of Famer Slater Martin at shooting guard. Led by coach John Kundla, this core group of players have been called the "first legacy in the history of professional basketball". The Lakers won the NBL championship in 1948, the BAA championship in 1949, and four NBA championships in 1950, 1952, 1953 and 1954. Pollard was a four-time NBA All-Star, and was named to the All-NBA First Team in 1949 and 1950, and Second Team in 1952 and 1954.

Pollard was renowned for his tremendous leaping ability, and subsequently earned the nickname "The Kangaroo Kid". He could reportedly touch the top of the backboard and dunk from the foul line, being one of the few players in his era who was capable of dunking a basketball. Pollard was also known for his corner jumpshot, and was a respected player and teammate. In 1952, the Basketball Association of America selected Pollard as the best player of the era.

Pollard retired from playing basketball after eight seasons, and finished with career averages of 13.2 points, 7.8 rebounds and 3.2 assists per game.

== Coaching career ==
Pollard immediately moved into coaching after retiring, taking the head coach position at La Salle University for the Explorers men's basketball team in 1955. Over three seasons with the team, Pollard compiled a record of 48–28.

Pollard was named interim head coach of the Minneapolis Lakers midway through the 1959–60 NBA season on January 2, 1960, and recorded a 14–25 record. He was named the head coach of the newly established Chicago Packers in 1961, and managed an 18–62 record in the team's first NBA season.

He moved to the American Basketball Association for the league's inaugural season in 1967, and coached the Minnesota Muskies to a 50–24 record in their first season. The Muskies relocated to Miami and became the Miami Floridians the following season, finishing 43–35. He was fired by the team midway through the 1969–70 season after the Floridians started the season with a 5–15 record.

== BAA/NBA career statistics ==
Legend
| GP | Games played | GS | Games started | MPG | Minutes per game |
| FG% | Field goal percentage | 3P% | 3-point field goal percentage | FT% | Free throw percentage |
| RPG | Rebounds per game | APG | Assists per game | SPG | Steals per game |
| BPG | Blocks per game | PPG | Points per game | **Bold** | Career high |
| † | Won an NBA championship |

=== Regular season ===
| Year | Team | GP | MPG | FG% | FT% | RPG | APG | PPG |
|---|---|---|---|---|---|---|---|---|
| 1948–49† | Minneapolis | 53 | – | **.396** | .687 | – | 2.7 | 14.8 |
| 1949–50† | Minneapolis | 66 | – | .346 | .764 | – | **3.8** | 14.7 |
| 1950–51 | Minneapolis | 54 | – | .352 | .750 | 9.0 | 3.4 | 11.6 |
| 1951–52† | Minneapolis | 65 | **39.2** | .356 | .704 | **9.1** | 3.6 | **15.5** |
| 1952–53† | Minneapolis | 66 | 36.4 | .357 | .769 | 6.8 | 3.5 | 13.0 |
| 1953–54† | Minneapolis | **71** | 35.0 | .370 | .778 | 7.0 | 3.0 | 11.7 |
| 1954–55 | Minneapolis | 63 | 31.1 | .354 | **.812** | 7.3 | 2.5 | 10.8 |
| Career | | 438 | 35.4 | .360 | .750 | 7.8 | 3.2 | 13.2 |
| All-Star | | 4 | 24.3 | .304 | .750 | 5.5 | 3.3 | 12.0 |

=== Playoffs ===
| Year | Team | GP | MPG | FG% | FT% | RPG | APG | PPG |
|---|---|---|---|---|---|---|---|---|
| 1949† | Minneapolis | 10 | – | .293 | .710 | – | 3.9 | 13.0 |
| 1950† | Minneapolis | 12 | – | .286 | .710 | – | **4.7** | 12.0 |
| 1951 | Minneapolis | 7 | – | .324 | **.833** | 8.9 | 3.9 | 13.6 |
| 1952† | Minneapolis | 11 | **42.6** | **.405** | .740 | 6.3 | 3.0 | **16.1** |
| 1953† | Minneapolis | 12 | 37.9 | .371 | .774 | 7.2 | 4.1 | 14.3 |
| 1954† | Minneapolis | **13** | 41.8 | .361 | .800 | 8.5 | 3.2 | 12.3 |
| 1955 | Minneapolis | 7 | 36.7 | .317 | .717 | **11.1** | 2.0 | 14.1 |
| Career | | 72 | 40.1 | .339 | .750 | 8.1 | 3.6 | 13.6 |

== Head coaching record ==
Legend
| Regular season | G | Games coached | W | Games won | L | Games lost | W–L % | Win–loss % |
| Playoffs | PG | Playoff games | PW | Playoff wins | PL | Playoff losses | PW–L % | Playoff win–loss % |

| Team | Year | G | W | L | W–L% | Finish | PG | PW | PL | PW–L% | Result |
|---|---|---|---|---|---|---|---|---|---|---|---|
| Minneapolis | 1959–60 | 39 | 14 | 25 | .359 | 3rd in Western | 9 | 5 | 4 | .556 | Lost in Conference finals |
| Chicago | 1961–62 | 80 | 18 | 62 | .225 | 5th in Western | — | — | — | — | Missed Playoffs |
| Minnesota | 1967–68 | 78 | 50 | 28 | .641 | 2nd in ABA Eastern Division | 10 | 4 | 6 | .400 | Lost in Conference finals |
| Miami | 1968–69 | 78 | 43 | 35 | .551 | 2nd in ABA Eastern Division | 12 | 5 | 7 | .417 | Lost in Conference finals |
| Miami | 1969–70 | 20 | 5 | 15 | .250 | (fired) | — | — | — | — | — |
| Total | | 295 | 130 | 165 | .441 | | 31 | 14 | 17 | .452 | |

== See also ==
- List of NBA players with most championships
