= Vivodina =

- Location within Croatia
- Coordinates: 45.675°N 15.395°E
- Country: Croatia
- County: Karlovac County

Area
  - Total: 0.5 km^{2} (0.19 sq mi)

Population (2021)
  - Total: 75
  - Density: 150/km^{2} (390/sq mi)
- Time zone: UTC+1 (CET)
  - Summer (DST): UTC+2 (CEST)

Vivodina is a village in Croatia, Karlovac County. It is first mentioned on September 22, 1321. The village is well known for a long winery tradition and that both parents of NBA Hall of Famer George Mikan descends from Vivodina near Ozalj. Here was born Ivan Rupert Gusić, writer and the first Kajkavian translator of the Holy Gospels.
