= Mikan drill =

Basketball drill

The Mikan drill (/ˈmaɪkən/) is a basketball drill commonly credited to George Mikan and his college coach at DePaul University Ray Meyer. It is designed to help basketball centers and forwards develop rhythm, timing for rebounding, and scoring in the paint. It is also used for outside players to better their layup skills and increase stamina, for longer games.

The drill is practiced as follows: From under the basket, make a layup with the right hand, catch the ball under the net with the left hand and make a layup with the left hand. Catch the ball out of the net with the right hand and lay it in with the right hand. Continue, alternating hands. Eventually the player should learn how to quickly grab the ball and take a shot while taking the permitted two steps.

Virtually every great forward and center since Mikan has practiced this drill. Kareem Abdul-Jabbar describes teaching it to children he coached in his book A Season on the Reservation. Shaquille O'Neal, who admired Mikan so much that he offered to pay for his funeral expenses, learned the drill from his coach Dale Brown, when O'Neal played college basketball at LSU. The drill is more or less a standard practice procedure for all basketball "big men".
