= 1951–52 Fort Wayne Pistons season =

NBA team season

- Head coach: Paul Birch
- Owner: Fred Zollner
- Arena: North Side High School Gym

Results
- Record: 29–37 (.439)
- Place: Division: 4th (Western)
- Playoff finish: West Division Semifinals (eliminated 0–2)
- Stats at Basketball Reference

The 1951–52 Fort Wayne Pistons season was the Pistons' fourth season in the NBA and 11th season as a franchise.

The Pistons struggled on the year, finishing with a 29-37 (.439) record, 4th place in the West Division. The team advanced to the playoffs, losing 2–0 in the opening round to the Rochester Royals. The team was led by guard Frank Brian (15.9 ppg, 3.5 apg, NBA All-Star) and a double-double from center/forward Larry Foust (15.9 ppg, 13.3 rpg), NBA All-Star).

During the NBA season, the Washington Capitols folded and their players were dispersed through a draft. The Pistons chose Bill Sharman, a future Hall of Fame inductee, but he refused to report to Fort Wayne and the Pistons traded him to the Boston Celtics.

== Draft picks ==
Round	Pick	Player	Position	Nationality	College
1	5	Zeke Sinicola	G	United States	Niagara
2	19	Jack Kiley	G	United States	Syracuse
3	31	Jake Fendley	G	United States	Northwestern

== Regular season ==
=== Season standings ===
Western Division	W	L	PCT	GB	Home	Road	Neutral	Div
x-Rochester Royals	41	25	.621	–	28–5	12–18	1–2	22–14
x-Minneapolis Lakers	40	26	.606	1	21–5	13–20	6–1	24–12
x-Indianapolis Olympians	34	32	.515	7	25–6	4–24	5–2	18–18
x-Fort Wayne Pistons	29	37	.439	12	22–11	6–24	1–2	17–19
Milwaukee Hawks	17	49	.258	24	8–13	3–22	6–14	9–27

x – clinched playoff spot

=== Game log ===
1951–52 Game log
#	Date	Opponent	Score	High points	Record
1	November 1	@ Syracuse	75–90	Chuck Share (21)	0–1
2	November 3	@ Philadelphia	69–70	Boag Johnson (22)	0–2
3	November 4	New York	75–84	Frank Brian (28)	1–2
4	November 6	@ Milwaukee	62–65 (OT)	Frank Brian (23)	1–3
5	November 9	@ Indianapolis	77–92	Larry Foust (18)	1–4
6	November 11	Milwaukee	59–74	Frank Brian (15)	2–4
7	November 14	@ Boston	91–98 (OT)	Frank Brian (21)	2–5
8	November 17	@ Minneapolis	64–68 (OT)	Frank Brian (23)	2–6
9	November 18	@ Rochester	76–71 (OT)	Larry Foust (25)	2–7
10	November 22	Syracuse	96–72	Frank Brian (15)	2–8
11	November 24	@ Rochester	63–74	Fred Schaus (14)	2–9
12	November 25	Baltimore	66–83	Larry Foust (16)	3–9
13	November 29	@ Syracuse	78–82	Fred Schaus (19)	3–10
14	December 1	@ Minneapolis	69–89	Fred Schaus (16)	3–11
15	December 2	Minneapolis	61–63	Larry Foust (23)	4–11
16	December 5	@ Boston	91–88	Frank Brian (29)	5–11
17	December 8	@ Milwaukee	71–82	Larry Foust (26)	5–12
18	December 9	Rochester	84–86	Frank Brian (25)	6–12
19	December 11	N Syracuse	80–62	Frank Brian (12)	6–13
20	December 14	@ Philadelphia	62–72	Larry Foust (21)	6–14
21	December 15	@ Baltimore	80–90	Ralph Johnson (18)	6–15
22	December 16	New York	80–71	Fred Schaus (25)	6–16
23	December 20	Rochester	69–54	Frank Brian (11)	6–17
24	December 23	Minneapolis	79–81	Fred Schaus (22)	7–17
25	December 25	@ New York	65–72	Frank Brian (14)	7–18
26	December 26	Boston	86–94	Fred Schaus (23)	8–18
27	December 29	@ Rochester	61–75	Frank Brian (13)	8–19
28	December 30	Milwaukee	60–77	Larry Foust (23)	9–19
29	December 31	@ Baltimore	95–86	Larry Foust (28)	10–19
30	January 1	Philadelphia	74–89	Jack Kerris (27)	11–19
31	January 4	N Minneapolis	79–64	Larry Foust (15)	11–20
32	January 6	Indianapolis	75–79	Frank Brian (23)	12–20
33	January 10	Boston	94–85	Larry Foust (19)	12–21
34	January 12	@ Rochester	88–76	Larry Foust (23)	13–21
35	January 13	Baltimore	71–81	Frank Brian (22)	14–21
36	January 15	@ Milwaukee	63–76	Larry Foust (22)	14–22
37	January 17	Philadelphia	78–82	Frank Brian (22)	15–22
38	January 20	Milwaukee	76–83	Larry Foust (18)	16–22
39	January 24	Rochester	90–94	Fred Schaus (23)	17–22
40	January 25	@ Indianapolis	79–83 (OT)	Fred Schaus (22)	17–23
41	January 26	@ Rochester	71–104	Fred Schaus (17)	17–24
42	January 27	New York	92–100	Larry Foust (29)	18–24
43	January 30	@ Indianapolis	81–77	Brian, Foust (18)	19–24
44	January 31	Minneapolis	85–78	Larry Foust (25)	19–25
45	February 2	@ Baltimore	76–63	Frank Brian (30)	20–25
46	February 3	Indianapolis	70–85	Fred Schaus (21)	21–25
47	February 5	Milwaukee	75–64	Foust, Schaus (15)	21–26
48	February 7	Philadelphia	105–91	Fred Schaus (27)	21–27
49	February 9	@ Minneapolis	70–67	Fred Schaus (22)	22–27
50	February 10	Baltimore	82–77	Fred Schaus (17)	22–28
51	February 12	@ Indianapolis	78–80	Larry Foust (21)	22–29
52	February 14	Boston	90–94	Jack Kerris (20)	23–29
53	February 17	Minneapolis	87–99	Larry Foust (25)	24–29
54	February 19	@ Philadelphia	80–98	Larry Foust (23)	24–30
55	February 21	@ Boston	67–88	Frank Brian (21)	24–31
56	February 23	@ New York	77–82 (OT)	Frank Brian (17)	24–32
57	February 24	Minneapolis	70–83	Frank Brian (20)	25–32
58	February 28	@ Syracuse	83–88	Fred Schaus (17)	25–33
59	March 1	N Milwaukee	58–66	Larry Foust (29)	26–33
60	March 2	Indianapolis	88–101	Larry Foust (31)	27–33
61	March 4	@ Indianapolis	68–86	Larry Foust (19)	27–34
62	March 6	Syracuse	83–81 (2OT)	Frank Brian (22)	27–35
63	March 7	@ Milwaukee	74–75	Brian, Schaus (20)	27–36
64	March 9	New York	79–80	Frank Brian (24)	28–36
65	March 13	Rochester	86–84	Chuck Share (18)	28–37
66	March 16	Indianapolis	92–111	Brian, Eddleman, Foust (19)	29–37

== Playoffs ==
1952 playoff game log
Division Semifinals: 0–2 (home: 0–1; road: 0–1)

Game	Date	Team	Score	High points	Location	Series
1	March 18	@ Rochester	L 78–95	Larry Foust (17)	Edgerton Park Arena	0–1
2	March 20	Rochester	L 86–92	Jack Kerris (17)	North Side High School Gym	0–2

1952 schedule

== Awards and records ==
- Larry Foust, All-NBA Second Team

== See also ==
- 1951–52 NBA season
