= Gonvick, Minnesota =

City in Minnesota, United States

Gonvick
- City
- Location of Gonvick, Minnesota
- Coordinates: 47°44′13″N 95°30′41″W
- Country: United States
- State: Minnesota
- County: Clearwater

Area
  - Total: 1.31 sq mi (3.39 km^{2})
  - Land: 1.31 sq mi (3.39 km^{2})
  - Water: 0 sq mi (0.00 km^{2})
- Elevation: 1,283 ft (391 m)

Population (2020)
  - Total: 263
  - Estimate (2021): 267
  - Density: 200.7/sq mi (77.48/km^{2})
- Time zone: UTC-6 (CST)
  - Summer (DST): UTC-5 (CDT)
- ZIP code: 56644
- Area code: 218
- FIPS code: 27-24344
- GNIS feature ID: 0644208

Gonvick is a city in Clearwater County, Minnesota, United States. The population was 263 at the 2020 census. Its peak population was 375 in 1950.

== History ==
A post office called Gonvick has been in operation since 1900. The city was named for Martin O. Gonvick, a pioneer settler and native of Norway.

The children in this area attend Clearbrook-Gonvick School, which is located in Clearbrook, which is approximately a five—minute commute away. The city of Gonvick had a school, which is now converted into a space for the Clearwater Life Center. It now includes a buy and sell, a florist, and numerous classes for varied activities. The Clearbrook Hornets and the Gonvick Bulldogs combined schools in 1992 as the Clearbrook-Gonvick Bears. Elementary students attended school in Gonvick while high school students were in Clearbrook until 2004, when the new school was built in Clearbrook to accommodate all the children.

Perhaps Gonvick's most famous native is Ed Widseth, an All-American tackle for the University of Minnesota and a three-time national champion from 1934 to 1936, who went on to play for the New York Giants and was inducted into the College Football Hall of Fame.

== Geography ==
According to the United States Census Bureau, the city has a total area of 1.29 square miles (3.34 km^{2}), all land.

Gonvick is along State Highway 92 (MN 92) and County Roads 7, 8, and 9.

== Demographics ==
Historical population
Census	Pop.	Note	%±
1920	276		—
1930	292		5.8%
1940	317		8.6%
1950	375		18.3%
1960	363		−3.2%
1970	344		−5.2%
1980	362		5.2%
1990	302		−16.6%
2000	294		−2.6%
2010	282		−4.1%
2020	263		−6.7%
2021 (est.)	267		1.5%
U.S. Decennial Census; 2020 Census

=== 2010 census ===
As of the census of 2010, there were 282 people, 128 households, and 79 families residing in the city. The population density was 218.6 inhabitants per square mile (84.4/km^{2}). There were 153 housing units at an average density of 118.6 per square mile (45.8/km^{2}). The racial makeup of the city was 94.0% White, 0.4% African American, 4.6% Native American, and 1.1% from two or more races. Hispanic or Latino of any race were 1.4% of the population.

There were 128 households, of which 29.7% had children under the age of 18 living with them, 47.7% were married couples living together, 7.8% had a female householder with no husband present, 6.3% had a male householder with no wife present, and 38.3% were non-families. 35.2% of all households were made up of individuals, and 14% had someone living alone who was 65 years of age or older. The average household size was 2.20 and the average family size was 2.82.

The median age in the city was 41.7 years. 24.5% of residents were under the age of 18; 3.5% were between the ages of 18 and 24; 25.9% were from 25 to 44; 26.2% were from 45 to 64; and 19.9% were 65 years of age or older. The gender makeup of the city was 51.8% male and 48.2% female.

=== 2000 census ===
As of the census of 2000, there were 294 people, 137 households, and 79 families residing in the city. The population density was 223.9 inhabitants per square mile (86.4/km^{2}). There were 154 housing units at an average density of 117.3 per square mile (45.3/km^{2}). The racial makeup of the city was 91.50% White, 4.42% Native American, 2.38% from other races, and 1.70% from two or more races. Hispanic or Latino of any race were 3.40% of the population.

There were 137 households, out of which 24.1% had children under the age of 18 living with them, 46.7% were married couples living together, 9.5% had a female householder with no husband present, and 42.3% were non-families. 40.1% of all households were made up of individuals, and 25.5% had someone living alone who was 65 years of age or older. The average household size was 2.15 and the average family size was 2.90.

In the city, the population was spread out, with 21.8% under the age of 18, 8.2% from 18 to 24, 24.5% from 25 to 44, 22.4% from 45 to 64, and 23.1% who were 65 years of age or older. The median age was 42 years. For every 100 females, there were 94.7 males. For every 100 females age 18 and over, there were 91.7 males.

The median income for a household in the city was $24,722, and the median income for a family was $40,417. Males had a median income of $25,000 versus $17,917 for females. The per capita income for the city was $14,650. About 9.9% of families and 12.0% of the population were below the poverty line, including 9.6% of those under the age of eighteen and 33.3% of those 65 or over.
