= 1952 NBA playoffs =

Postseason tournament

Tournament details
- Dates: March 18 – April 25, 1952
- Season: 1951–52
- Teams: 8

Final positions
- Champions: Minneapolis Lakers (3rd title)
- Runner-up: New York Knicks
- Semifinalists: Rochester Royals; Syracuse Nationals

The 1952 NBA playoffs was the postseason tournament of the National Basketball Association's 1951–52 season. The tournament concluded with the Western Conference champion Minneapolis Lakers defeating the Eastern Conference champion New York Knicks 4 games to 3 in the NBA Finals.

For the first time in NBA history, all teams that made the playoffs the year before meet again, but this time with different outcomes. This would happen again in 1957, in 1966, and then 1973 before a few more teams add to the playoffs in 1975, 1977 and 1984.

The first NBA dynasty, the Lakers, won their third NBA title in the last 4 years and what would become their first of 3 straight titles.

== Bracket ==
Division Semifinals
E1	Syracuse*	2
E4	Philadelphia	1
Eastern Division
E3	New York	2
E2	Boston	1
W1	Rochester*	2
W4	Fort Wayne	0
Western Division
W3	Indianapolis	0
W2	Minneapolis	2

Division Finals
E1	Syracuse*	1
E3	New York	3
W1	Rochester*	1
W2	Minneapolis	3

NBA Finals
E3	New York	3
W2	Minneapolis	4

- * Division winner
- Bold Series winner
- Italic Team with home-court advantage in NBA Finals

== Division Semifinals ==
=== Eastern Division Semifinals ===
==== (1) Syracuse Nationals vs. (4) Philadelphia Warriors ====
March 20

Boxscore

Philadelphia Warriors 83, Syracuse Nationals 102
Scoring by quarter: 19–25, 21–24, 22–28, 21–25
Pts: Paul Arizin 22; Rebs: Paul Arizin 13; Asts: Andy Phillip 6	Pts: Dolph Schayes 31; Rebs: Dolph Schayes 18; Asts: Seymour, Osterkorn 4 each
Syracuse leads series, 1–0

Onondaga War Memorial, Syracuse, New York

March 22

Boxscore

Syracuse Nationals 95, Philadelphia Warriors 100
Scoring by quarter: 22–30, 23–28, 21–18, 29–24
Pts: Osterkorn, Seymour 16 each Rebs: Schayes, Ratkovicz 12 each Asts: Wally Osterkorn 7	Pts: Paul Arizin 29; Rebs: Paul Arizin 10; Asts: Andy Phillip 9
Series tied, 1–1

Philadelphia Arena, Philadelphia, Pennsylvania

March 23

Boxscore

Philadelphia Warriors 73, Syracuse Nationals 84
Scoring by quarter: 24–22, 20–20, 11–19, 18–23
Pts: Paul Arizin 26; Rebs: Paul Arizin 15; Asts: Andy Phillip 7	Pts: Red Rocha 20; Rebs: Wally Osterkorn 12; Asts: Paul Seymour 4
Syracuse wins series, 2–1

Onondaga War Memorial, Syracuse, New York

This was the third playoff meeting between these two teams, with the 76ers/Nationals winning the first two meetings.

Previous playoff series
Philadelphia 76ers/ Syracuse Nationals leads 2–0 in all-time playoff series

1950

Philadelphia Warriors 0, Syracuse Nationals 2

1950 Eastern Division Semifinals

1951

Philadelphia Warriors 0, Syracuse Nationals 2

1951 Eastern Division Semifinals

==== (2) Boston Celtics vs. (3) New York Knicks ====
March 19

Boxscore

New York Knicks 94, Boston Celtics 105
Scoring by quarter: 18–21, 21–32, 25–24, 30–28
Pts: Max Zaslofsky 20; Asts: Dick McGuire 7	Pts: Bob Cousy 31; Asts: Bill Sharman 7
Boston leads series, 1–0

Boston Garden, Boston, Massachusetts

March 23

Boxscore

Boston Celtics 97, New York Knicks 101
Scoring by quarter: 25–22, 22–29, 25–26, 25–24
Pts: Ed Macauley 36; Asts: Bob Donham 9	Pts: Connie Simmons 22; Asts: Dick McGuire 7
Series tied, 1–1

Madison Square Garden III, Manhattan, New York
Referees: Chuck Solodare, Jocko Collins

March 26

Boxscore

New York Knicks 88, Boston Celtics 87 (2OT)
Scoring by quarter: 13–20, 26–21, 25–17, 15–21, Overtime: 4–4, 5–4
Pts: Max Zaslofsky 21; Asts: Dick McGuire 9	Pts: Bob Cousy 34; Asts: Bob Cousy 8
New York wins series, 2–1

Boston Garden, Boston, Massachusetts
Referees: Chuck Solodare, Jocko Collins

This was the second playoff meeting between these two teams, with the Knicks winning the first two meetings.

Previous playoff series
New York leads 1–0 in all-time playoff series

1951

Boston Celtics 0, New York Knicks 2

1951 Eastern Division Semifinals

=== Western Division Semifinals ===
==== (1) Rochester Royals vs. (4) Fort Wayne Pistons ====
March 18

Boxscore

Fort Wayne Pistons 78, Rochester Royals 95
Scoring by quarter: 22–22, 14–17, 18–23, 24–33
Pts: Larry Foust 17	Pts: Bobby Wanzer 26
Rochester leads series, 1–0

Edgerton Park Arena, Rochester, New York

March 20

Boxscore

Rochester Royals 92, Fort Wayne Pistons 86
Scoring by quarter: 30–17, 14–26, 23–15, 25–28
Pts: Bob Davies 29	Pts: Jack Kerris 17
Rochester wins series, 2–0

North Side High School Gym, Fort Wayne, Indiana

This was the third playoff meeting between these two teams, with both teams splitting the first two meetings.

Previous playoff series
Tied 1–1 in all-time playoff series

1950

Fort Wayne Pistons 2, Rochester Royals 0

1950 Central Division Semifinals

1951

Fort Wayne Pistons 1, Rochester Royals 2

1951 Western Division Semifinals

==== (2) Minneapolis Lakers vs. (3) Indianapolis Olympians ====
March 23

Boxscore

Indianapolis Olympians 70, Minneapolis Lakers 78
Scoring by quarter: 18–19, 21–18, 14–18, 17–23
Pts: Barnhorst, Graboski 17 each	Pts: George Mikan 24
Minneapolis leads series, 1–0

Minneapolis Auditorium, Minneapolis, Minnesota
Referees: Sid Borgia, Arnie Heft

March 25

Boxscore

Minneapolis Lakers 94, Indianapolis Olympians 87
Scoring by quarter: 23–24, 21–25, 25–21, 25–17
Pts: George Mikan 36	Pts: Joe Graboski 29
Minneapolis wins series, 2–0

Butler Fieldhouse, Indianapolis, Indiana

This was the second playoff meeting between these two teams, with the Lakers winning the first meeting.

Previous playoff series
Minneapolis leads 1–0 in all-time playoff series

1951

Indianapolis Olympians 1, Minneapolis Lakers 2

1951 Western Division Semifinals

== Division Finals ==
=== Eastern Division Finals ===
==== (1) Syracuse Nationals vs. (3) New York Knicks ====
April 2

Boxscore

New York Knicks 87, Syracuse Nationals 85
Scoring by quarter: 13–23, 23–22, 28–13, 23–27
Pts: Max Zaslofsky 26	Pts: Dolph Schayes 25
New York leads series, 1–0

Onondaga War Memorial, Syracuse, New York

April 3

Boxscore

New York Knicks 92, Syracuse Nationals 102
Scoring by quarter: 22–21, 27–27, 17–27, 26–27
Pts: Harry Gallatin 16	Pts: Paul Seymour 21
Series tied, 1–1

Onondaga War Memorial, Syracuse, New York
Referees: Sid Borgia, Julie Meyer

April 5

Boxscore

Syracuse Nationals 92, New York Knicks 99
Scoring by quarter: 19–24, 23–29, 22–14, 28–32
Pts: Red Rocha 22	Pts: Max Zaslofsky 20
New York leads series, 2–1

Madison Square Garden III, Manhattan, New York
Referees: Julie Meyer, Phil Fox

April 8

Boxscore

Syracuse Nationals 93, New York Knicks 100
Scoring by quarter: 16–20, 22–20, 17–28, 38–32
Pts: Dolph Schayes 22	Pts: Max Zaslofsky 20
New York wins series, 3–1

Madison Square Garden III, Manhattan, New York

This was the third playoff meeting between these two teams, with both teams splitting the first two meetings.

Previous playoff series
Tied 1–1 in all-time playoff series

1950

New York Knicks 1, Syracuse Nationals 2

1950 Eastern Division Finals

1951

New York Knicks 3, Syracuse Nationals 2

1951 Eastern Division Finals

=== Western Division Finals ===
==== (1) Rochester Royals vs. (2) Minneapolis Lakers ====
March 29

Boxscore

Minneapolis Lakers 78, Rochester Royals 88
Scoring by quarter: 25–28, 17–19, 23–23, 13–18
Pts: George Mikan 47	Pts: Bob Davies 26
Rochester leads series, 1–0

Edgerton Park Arena, Rochester, New York

March 30

Boxscore

Minneapolis Lakers 83, Rochester Royals 78 (OT)
Scoring by quarter: 27–17, 15–17, 17–20, 14–19, Overtime: 10–5
Pts: Vern Mikkelsen 19	Pts: Arnie Risen 24
Series tied, 1–1

Edgerton Park Arena, Rochester, New York

April 5

Boxscore

Rochester Royals 67, Minneapolis Lakers 77
Scoring by quarter: 14–14, 15–22, 19–18, 19–23
Pts: Arnie Johnson 16	Pts: Jim Pollard 22
Minneapolis leads series, 2–1

Minneapolis Auditorium, Minneapolis, Minnesota

April 6

Boxscore

Rochester Royals 80, Minneapolis Lakers 82
Scoring by quarter: 20–20, 26–23, 19–22, 15–17
Pts: Bob Davies 21	Pts: Saul, Mikkelsen 18 each
Minneapolis wins series, 3–1

Minneapolis Auditorium, Minneapolis, Minnesota
Referees: Sid Borgia, Stan Stutz

This was the third playoff meeting between these two teams, with both teams splitting the first two meetings.

Previous playoff series
Tied 1–1 in all-time playoff series

1949

Minneapolis Lakers 2, Rochester Royals 0

1949 Western Division Finals

1951

Minneapolis Lakers 1, Rochester Royals 3

1951 Western Division Finals

== NBA Finals: (W2) Minneapolis Lakers vs. (E3) New York Knicks ==
April 12

Boxscore

New York Knicks 79, Minneapolis Lakers 83 (OT)
Scoring by quarter: 18–21, 14–19, 27–20, 12–11, Overtime: 8–12
Pts: Simmons, McGuire 15 each Rebs: Nat Clifton 12; Asts: Dick McGuire 5	Pts: Jim Pollard 34; Rebs: George Mikan 16; Asts: Pollard, Mikan 4 each
Minneapolis leads series, 1–0

St. Paul Auditorium, Saint Paul, Minnesota
Attendance: 8,722
Referees: Sid Borgia, Stan Stutz

April 13

Boxscore

New York Knicks 80, Minneapolis Lakers 72
Scoring by quarter: 11–17, 30–14, 20–20, 19–21
Pts: Harry Gallatin 18; Rebs: Harry Gallatin 11; Asts: Dick McGuire 5	Pts: George Mikan 18; Rebs: George Mikan 21; Asts: Slater Martin 4
Series tied, 1–1

St. Paul Auditorium, Saint Paul, Minnesota
Referees: Sid Borgia, Stan Stutz

April 16

Boxscore

Minneapolis Lakers 82, New York Knicks 77
Scoring by quarter: 19–20, 22–26, 19–16, 22–15
Pts: George Mikan 26; Rebs: George Mikan 17; Asts: Pep Saul 8	Pts: Max Zaslofsky 17; Rebs: Nat Clifton 10; Asts: Dick McGuire 10
Minneapolis leads series, 2–1

69th Regiment Armory, Manhattan, New York
Attendance: 4,500

April 18

Boxscore

Minneapolis Lakers 89, New York Knicks 90 (OT)
Scoring by quarter: 21–23, 21–18, 20–16, 15–20, Overtime: 12–13
Pts: Slater Martin 32; Rebs: George Mikan 17; Asts: Pep Saul 5	Pts: Connie Simmons 30; Rebs: Nat Clifton 12; Asts: Dick McGuire 6
Series tied, 2–2

69th Regiment Armory, Manhattan, New York
Attendance: 5,200
Referees: Sid Borgia, Stan Stutz

April 20

Boxscore

New York Knicks 89, Minneapolis Lakers 102
Scoring by quarter: 26–33, 22–16, 17–28, 24–25
Pts: Nat Clifton 17; Rebs: Clifton, Gallatin 8 each Asts: six players 1 each	Pts: Mikkelsen, Mikan 32 each Rebs: George Mikan 17; Asts: Pep Saul 5
Minneapolis leads series, 3–2

St. Paul Auditorium, Saint Paul, Minnesota
Attendance: 7,244
Referees: Sid Borgia, Stan Stutz

April 23

Boxscore

Minneapolis Lakers 68, New York Knicks 76
Scoring by quarter: 20–24, 13–11, 19–17, 16–24
Pts: George Mikan 28; Rebs: George Mikan 15; Asts: Slater Martin 9	Pts: Max Zaslofsky 23; Rebs: Harry Gallatin 13; Asts: Ernie Vandeweghe 7
Series tied, 3–3

69th Regiment Armory, Manhattan, New York
Attendance: 3,000

April 25

Boxscore

New York Knicks 65, Minneapolis Lakers 82
Scoring by quarter: 12–18, 17–18, 8–13, 28–33
Pts: Max Zaslofsky 21; Rebs: Nat Clifton 10; Asts: Nat Clifton 3	Pts: George Mikan 22; Rebs: George Mikan 19; Asts: Slater Martin 6
Minneapolis wins series, 4–3

Minneapolis Auditorium, Minneapolis, Minnesota
Attendance: 8,612
Referees: Sid Borgia, Stan Stutz

This was the first playoff meeting between these two teams.
