= George Mikan =

American basketball player (1924–2005)

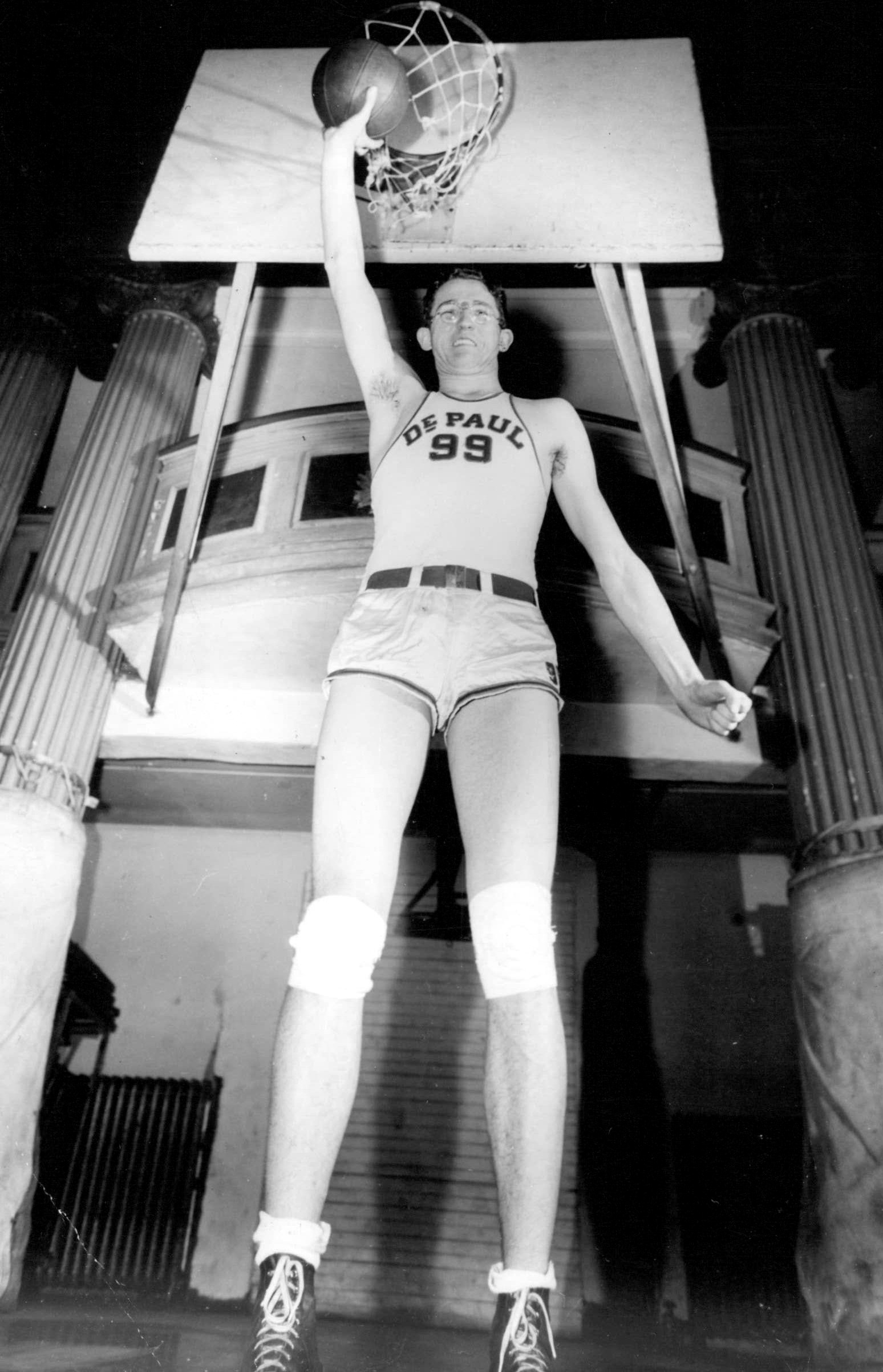
- Mikan in 1945

Personal information
- Born: June 18, 1924 Joliet, Illinois, U.S.
- Died: June 1, 2005 (aged 80) Scottsdale, Arizona, U.S.
- Listed height: 6 ft 10 in (2.08 m)
- Listed weight: 245 lb (111 kg)

Career information
- High school: Joliet Catholic (Joliet, Illinois)
- College: DePaul (1942–1946)
- Playing career: 1946–1954, 1956
- Position: Center
- Number: 99
- Coaching career: 1957–1958

Career history

Playing
- 1946–1947: Chicago American Gears
- 1947–1954, 1956: Minneapolis Lakers

Career highlights
- 5× BAA/NBA champion (1949, 1950, 1952–1954); 2× NBL champion (1947, 1948); NBL Most Valuable Player (1948); 4× NBA All-Star (1951–1954); NBA All-Star Game MVP (1953); 6× All-BAA/NBA First Team (1949–1954); 2× All-NBL First Team (1947, 1948); NBL scoring champion (1948); 3× NBA scoring champion (1949–1951); NBA rebounding leader (1953); NBA anniversary team (25th, 35th, 50th, 75th); No. 99 retired by Los Angeles Lakers; 2× Helms Player of the Year (1944, 1945); Sporting News Player of the Year (1945); 3× Consensus first-team All-American (1944–1946); No. 99 retired by DePaul Blue Demons (1990)

Career NBL/BAA/NBA statistics
- Points: 11,764 (22.6 ppg) (NBL / BAA / NBA); 10,156 (23.1 ppg) (BAA / NBA)
- Rebounds: 4,167 (13.4 rpg) (NBA last five seasons)
- Assists: 1,245 (2.8 apg) (BAA / NBA)
- Stats at NBA.com
- Stats at Basketball Reference
- Basketball Hall of Fame
- Collegiate Basketball Hall of Fame

George Lawrence Mikan Jr. (/ˈmaɪkən/; June 18, 1924 – June 1, 2005), nicknamed "Mr. Basketball", was an American professional basketball player for the Chicago American Gears of the National Basketball League (NBL) and the Minneapolis Lakers of the NBL, the Basketball Association of America (BAA) and the National Basketball Association (NBA). Invariably playing with thick, round spectacles, the 6 ft 10 in (2.08 m), 245 lb (111 kg) Mikan was one of the pioneers of professional basketball. Through his size and play, he redefined basketball as a game dominated in his day by "big men". His prolific rebounding, shot blocking, and ability to shoot over smaller defenders with his ambidextrous hook shot all helped to change the game. He also used the underhanded free-throw shooting technique long before Rick Barry made it his signature shot.

Mikan had a highly successful playing career, winning seven NBL, BAA, and NBA championships in nine seasons, an NBA All-Star Game MVP trophy, and three scoring titles. He played in the first four NBA All-Star games and was a member of the first six All-BAA and All-NBA Teams. Mikan was so dominant that he prompted several significant rule changes in the NBA, including the introduction of the goaltending rule, the widening of the foul lane—known as the "Mikan Rule"—and the creation of the shot clock.

After his playing career, Mikan became one of the founders of the American Basketball Association (ABA), serving as commissioner of the league. He was instrumental in forming the NBA's Minnesota Timberwolves expansion team. In his later years, Mikan was involved in a long-standing legal battle against the NBA to increase the meager pensions of players who had retired before the league became lucrative. In 2005, Mikan died of complications from chronic diabetes.

For his accomplishments, Mikan was inducted into the Naismith Memorial Basketball Hall of Fame in 1959. He was also named to the 25th, 35th, 50th and 75th NBA anniversary teams.

== Early life ==
Mikan was born on June 18, 1924, in Joliet, Illinois, to a Croatian father, Joseph, and a Lithuanian mother, Minnie, along with brothers Joe and Ed and sister Marie. His grandfather, Juraj (George) Mikan was born in Vivodina, Croatia, then part of Austria-Hungary, in or about 1874. Juraj immigrated to Braddock, Pennsylvania, in 1891, where he married another Croatian immigrant, Marija, in 1906 in Allegheny, Pennsylvania. On October 17, 1907, Mikan's father Joseph was born, and soon thereafter the family moved to Joliet, where they opened Mikan's Tavern at the corner of Elsie Avenue and North Broadway.

As a boy, Mikan shattered one of his knees so badly that he was kept in bed for a year and a half. In 1938, Mikan attended the Archbishop Quigley Preparatory Seminary in Chicago and originally wanted to be a Catholic priest but later moved back home to finish at Joliet Catholic. Mikan did not seem destined to become an athlete. When Mikan entered Chicago's DePaul University in 1942, he stood 6 ft 10 in (2.08 m), weighed 245 lb (111 kg), moved awkwardly because of his frame, and wore thick glasses for his nearsightedness.

== College career ==
While in high school, Mikan met 28-year-old rookie DePaul basketball coach Ray Meyer. Meyer saw potential in Mikan, who was bright and intelligent but was also clumsy and shy. Meyer's thoughts were revolutionary for the time, when it was still believed that tall players were too awkward to ever play basketball well. In the following months, Meyer transformed Mikan into a confident, aggressive player who took pride in his height rather than being ashamed of it. Meyer and Mikan worked out intensively, and Mikan learned how to make hook shots accurately with either hand. His workout routine would become later known as the Mikan drill. In addition, Meyer made Mikan punch a speed bag, take dancing lessons, and jump rope to make him a complete athlete.

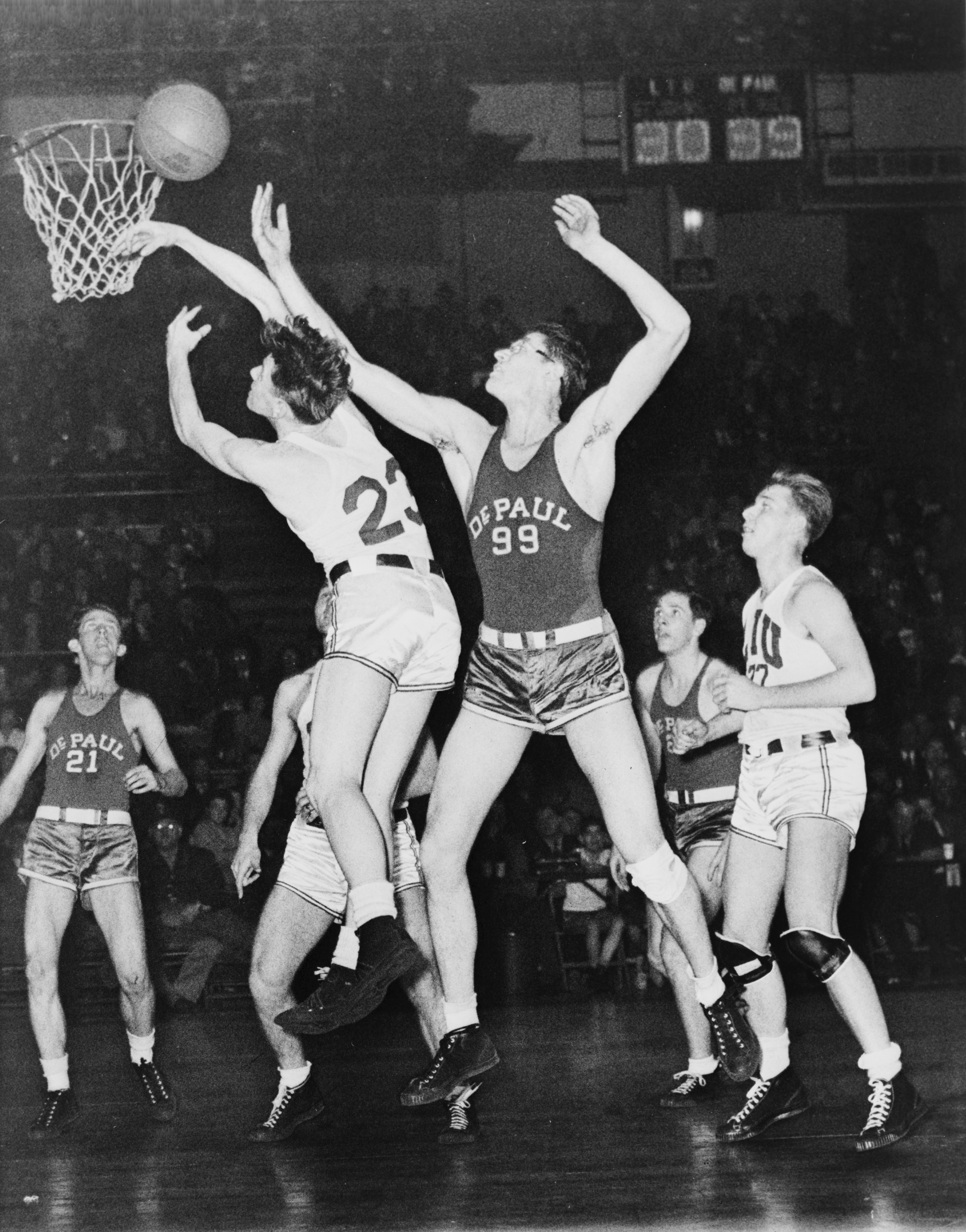
Mikan in a game against Long Island University at Madison Square Garden, 1944

Mikan dominated his peers from the start of his National Collegiate Athletic Association (NCAA) career at DePaul. He intimidated opponents with his size and strength and was unstoppable on offense with his hook shot. Mikan established a reputation as one of the hardest and grittiest players in the league, often playing through injuries and punishing opposing centers with hard fouls. In addition, Mikan surprised the basketball world with his ability to goaltend, swatting balls in flight before they could reach the hoop. "We would set up a zone defense that had four men around the key and I guarded the basket", Mikan later recalled. "When the other team took a shot, I'd just go up and tap it out." As a consequence, the NCAA (and later the NBA) outlawed touching a ball either after it had reached its apex in flight or after it had touched the backboard and had a chance of going in the hoop. Bob Kurland, a 7 ft 0 in (2.13 m) tall center for Oklahoma A&M, was one of the few opposing NCAA centers to have any success against Mikan.

Mikan was named the Helms NCAA College Player of the Year in 1944 and 1945 and was an All-American basketball player three times. In 1945, he led DePaul to the NIT title, which at that time was more prestigious than the NCAA title. Mikan led the nation in scoring with 23.9 points per game in 1944–45 and 23.1 points per game in 1945–46. When DePaul won the 1945 NIT, Mikan was named Most Valuable Player for scoring 120 points in three games, including 53 points in a 97–53 win over Rhode Island.

== Professional career ==
=== Chicago American Gears (1946–1947) ===
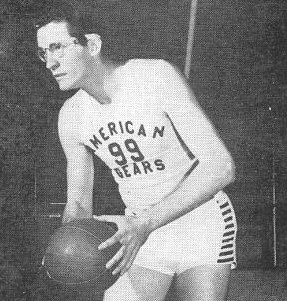
Mikan as member of the Chicago American Gears

After the end of the 1945–46 college season, Mikan signed with the Chicago American Gears of the National Basketball League, a predecessor of the modern NBA. He played with the Gears for 25 games at the end of the 1946–47 NBL season, scoring 16.5 points per game as a rookie. Mikan led the Gears to a third-place finish at the 1946 World Professional Basketball Tournament, where he was named Most Valuable Player after scoring 100 points in five games. Mikan was also chosen for the All-NBL Team.

Before the start of the 1947–48 NBL season, Gears owner Maurice White pulled the team out of the league. White attempted to create a 24-team league called the Professional Basketball League of America in which he owned all the teams. However, the league folded after just a month, and the players of White's teams were distributed among the remaining NBL franchises via dispersal draft. The new Minneapolis Lakers were the successor franchise to the Detroit Gems, which had the NBL's worst record at 4–40 and thus had the first pick in the dispersal draft, using the pick on Mikan. After several days of negotiations – Mikan was attending law school at DePaul and wanted to remain in Chicago – Mikan agreed to a contract with the Lakers, playing for coach John Kundla.

=== Minneapolis Lakers (1947–1954, 1956) ===
In his first season with the Lakers, Mikan led the league in scoring with 1,195 points, becoming the only NBL player to score more than 1,000 points in an NBL season. Following the regular season, he was named the league's MVP and the Lakers won the NBL title. In April 1948, he led the Lakers to victory in the World Professional Basketball Tournament, where he was named MVP after scoring a tournament-record 40 points against the New York Renaissance in the title-clinching game. Following the end of the 1947–48 NBL season, Mikan would also play for the Original Celtics for a few exhibition matches as well.

The following year, the Lakers and three other NBL franchises jumped to the fledgling Basketball Association of America. Mikan led the new league in scoring, and again set a single-season scoring record. The Lakers defeated the Washington Capitols in the 1949 BAA Finals.

In 1949, the BAA and NBL merged to form the NBA. The new league started the inaugural 1949–50 NBA season, featuring 17 teams, with the Lakers in the Central Division. Mikan again was dominant, averaging 27.4 points per game and 2.9 assists per game and taking another scoring title; After posting an impressive 51–17 record and storming through the playoffs, Mikan's team played the 1950 NBA Finals against the Syracuse Nationals. In Game 1, the Lakers beat Syracuse on their home court when Lakers reserve guard Bob Harrison made a 40-foot buzzer beater to give Minneapolis a two-point win. The team split the next four games, and in Game 6, the Lakers won 110–95 and won the first-ever NBA championship. Mikan scored 31.3 points per game in the playoffs.

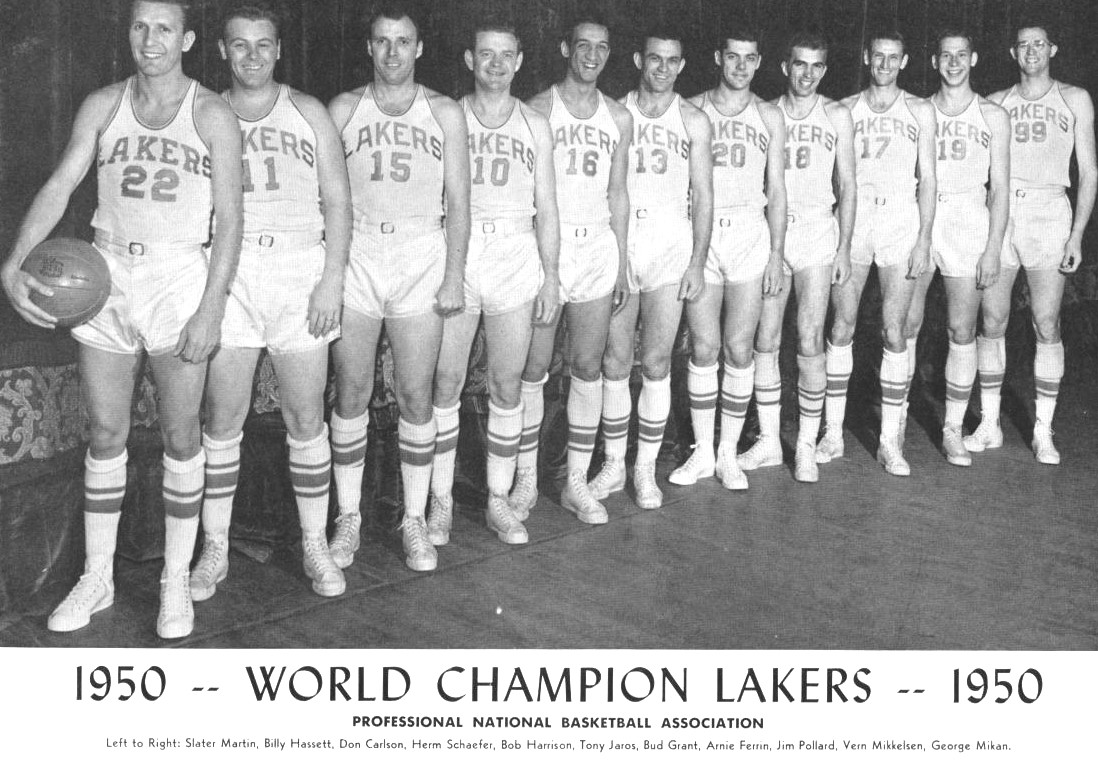
Mikan (far right) and the 1950–51 Lakers

In the 1950–51 NBA season, Mikan was dominant again, scoring a career-best 28.4 points per game in the regular season. He won another scoring crown and averaged 3.1 assists per game. In that year, the NBA introduced a new statistic: rebounds. In this category, Mikan also stood out; his 14.1 rebounds per game (rpg) was second only to the 16.4 rpg of Dolph Schayes of Syracuse. In that year, Mikan participated in one of the most notorious NBA games ever played. When the Fort Wayne Pistons played against his Lakers, the Pistons took a 19–18 lead. Afraid that Mikan would mount a comeback if he got the ball, the Pistons passed the ball around without any attempt to score a basket. With no shot clock invented yet to force them to shoot, the score remained 19–18 until the game's end. The game is the lowest-scoring NBA game of all time. This game was an important factor in the development of the shot clock, which was introduced four years later. Mikan had scored 15 of the Lakers' 18 points, thus scoring 83.3% of his team's points and setting an NBA all-time record. In the postseason, Mikan fractured his leg before the 1951 Western Division Finals against the Rochester Royals. With Mikan hardly able to move all series long, the Royals won 3–1. Decades later, in 1990, Mikan recalled that his leg was taped with a plate; however, despite effectively hopping around the court on one foot, he said he still averaged 20-odd points per game.

In the 1951–52 NBA season, the NBA decided to widen the foul lane under the basket from 6 feet to 12 feet. As players could stay in the lane for only three seconds at a time, the widened lane forced big men like Mikan to position themselves further from the basket on offense. A main proponent of this rule was New York Knicks coach Joe Lapchick, who regarded Mikan as his nemesis; the rule was dubbed "The Mikan Rule". While Mikan still scored an impressive 23.8 points per game, this output was less than his 27.4 points per game the previous season. Also, his field goal percentage sank from .428 to .385. He still pulled down 13.5 rebounds per game and logged 3.0 assists per game. Mikan also had a truly dominating game that season. On January 20, 1952, he scored a personal-best 61 points in a 91-81 double-overtime victory against the Rochester Royals. At the time, it was the second-best scoring performance in league history behind Joe Fulks' 63-point game in 1949. Mikan's output more than doubled that of his teammates, who combined for 30 points. He also grabbed 36 rebounds, a record at the time. Later that season, the Lakers reached the 1952 NBA Finals and were pitted against the New York Knicks. This qualified as one of the strangest Finals series in NBA history, as neither team could play on their home court in the first six games. The Lakers' Minneapolis Auditorium was already booked, and the Knicks' Madison Square Garden was occupied by the Ringling Bros. and Barnum & Bailey Circus. Instead, the Lakers played in St. Paul and the Knicks in the damp, dimly lit 69th Regiment Armory. Perpetually double-teamed by Knicks' Nat Clifton and Harry Gallatin, Mikan was unable to assert himself, and the two teams split the first six games. In the only true home game, Game 7 in the Auditorium, the Lakers won 82–65 and edged the Knicks 4–3, winning the NBA title and earning themselves $7,500 to split amongst the team members.

During the 1952–53 NBA season, Mikan averaged 20.6 points per game, a career-high 14.4 rebounds per game, and 2.9 assists per game. His rebounding average was the highest in the league. In the 1953 NBA All-Star Game, Mikan had 22 points and 16 rebounds and won that game's MVP Award. The Lakers made the 1953 NBA Finals and again defeated the Knicks 4–1.

In the 1953–54 NBA season, the now 29-year-old Mikan slowly declined, averaging 18.1 points, 14.3 rebounds and 2.4 assists per game. Under his leadership, the Lakers won another NBA title, giving the team its third-straight championship and fifth in six years. From an NBA perspective, the Minneapolis Lakers dynasty has only been convincingly surpassed by the eleven-title Boston Celtics dynasty of 1957–69.

At the end of the 1953–54 season, Mikan announced his retirement. He later said: "I had a family growing, and I decided to be with them. I felt it was time to get started with the professional world outside of basketball." Injuries also were a factor, as Mikan had sustained 10 broken bones and 16 stitches in his career and often played through these injuries. Without Mikan, the Lakers made the playoffs, but were unable to reach the 1955 NBA Finals. In the middle of the 1955–56 NBA season, Mikan returned to the Lakers lineup. He played in 37 games, but his long absence had affected his play. He averaged only 10.5 points, 8.3 rebounds and 1.3 assists, and the Lakers lost in the first round of the playoffs. At the end of the season, Mikan retired for good. His 10,156 points were a record at the time; he was the first NBA player to score 10,000 points in a career. He was inducted into the inaugural Basketball Hall of Fame class of 1959 and was declared the greatest player of the first half of the century by The Associated Press.

== Career statistics ==
=== NBL ===
Legend
GP	Games played	FGM	Field goals made
FTM	Free throws made	FTA	Free throws attempted
FT%	Free throw percentage	PTS	Total points
PPG	Points per game	**Bold**	Career high

†	Denotes seasons in which Mikan's team won an NBL championship
*	Led the league
‡	Denotes NBL record

==== Regular season ====
Year	Team	GP	FGM	FTM	FTA	FT%	PTS	PPG
1946–47†	Chicago	25	147	119	164	.726	413	16.5*
1947–48†	Minneapolis	**56**	**406**‡	**383**‡	**509**	**.752**	**1,195**‡	**21.3***
Career		81	553	502	673	.746	1,608	19.9*

==== Playoffs ====
Year	Team	GP	FGM	FTM	FTA	FT%	PTS	PPG
1947†	Chicago	**11**	72	**73**	**96**	**.760**	217	19.7
1948†	Minneapolis	10	**88**	68	**96**	.708	**244**	**24.4**
Career		21	160	141	192	.734	461	22.0

=== BAA/NBA ===
Legend
GP	Games played	GS	Games started	MPG	Minutes per game
FG%	Field goal percentage	3P%	3-point field goal percentage	FT%	Free throw percentage
RPG	Rebounds per game	APG	Assists per game	SPG	Steals per game
BPG	Blocks per game	PPG	Points per game	**Bold**	Career high
†	Won an NBA championship	*	Led the league

==== Regular season ====
Year	Team	GP	MPG	FG%	FT%	RPG	APG	PPG
1948–49†	Minneapolis	60	—	.416	.772	—	**3.6**	28.3*
1949–50†	Minneapolis	68	—	.407	.779	—	2.9	27.4*
1950–51	Minneapolis	68	—	**.428**	**.803**	14.1	3.1	**28.4***
1951–52†	Minneapolis	64	**40.2**	.385	.780	13.5*	3.0	23.8
1952–53†	Minneapolis	70	37.9	.399	.780	**14.4***	2.9	20.6
1953–54†	Minneapolis	**72**	32.8	.380	.777	14.3	2.4	18.1
1955–56	Minneapolis	37	20.7	.395	.770	8.3	1.4	10.5
Career		439	34.4	.404	.782	13.4	2.8	23.1
All-Star		4	25.0	.350	.815	12.8	1.8	19.5

==== Playoffs ====
Year	Team	GP	MPG	FG%	FT%	RPG	APG	PPG
1949†	Minneapolis	10	—	.454	.802	—	2.1	30.3
1950†	Minneapolis	12	—	.383	.788	—	**3.0**	**31.3**
1951	Minneapolis	7	—	.408	.800	10.6	1.3	24.0
1952†	Minneapolis	**13**	**42.5**	.379	.790	**15.9**	2.8	23.6
1953†	Minneapolis	12	38.6	.366	.732	15.4	1.9	19.8
1954†	Minneapolis	**13**	32.6	**.458**	**.813**	13.2	1.9	19.4
1956	Minneapolis	3	20.0	.371	.769	9.3	1.7	12.0
Career		70	36.6	.404	.786	13.9	2.2	24.0

== Head coaching record ==
=== NBA ===
Legend
Regular season	G	Games coached	W	Games won	L	Games lost	W–L %	Win–loss %
Playoffs	PG	Playoff games	PW	Playoff wins	PL	Playoff losses	PW–L %	Playoff win–loss %

Team	Year	G	W	L	W–L%	Finish	PG	PW	PL	PW–L%	Result
Minneapolis	1957–58	39	9	30	.231	(fired)	—	—	—	—	—

== Post-playing career ==
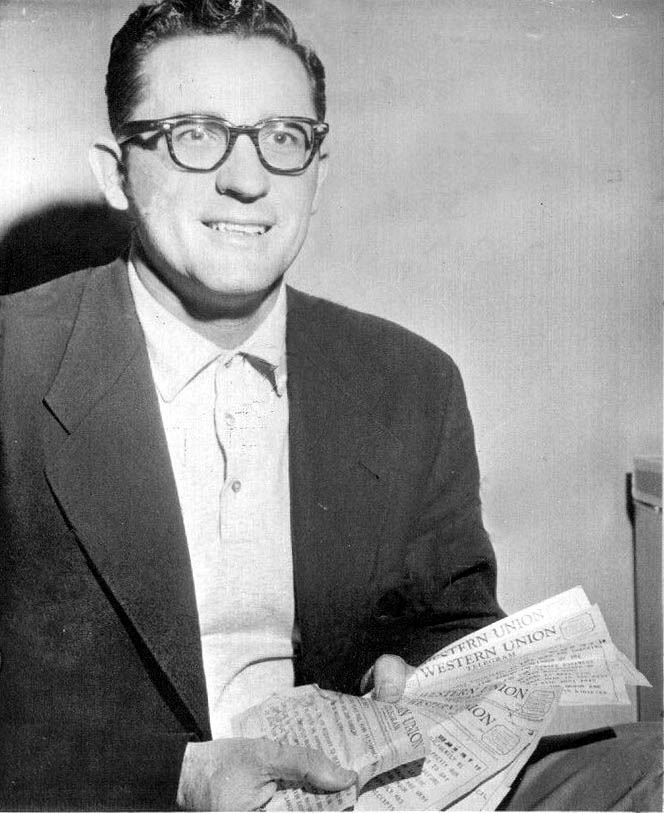
Mikan in 1958

In 1956, Mikan was the Republican candidate for the United States Congress in Minnesota's 3rd congressional district. He challenged incumbent Representative Roy Wier in a closely fought race that featured a high voter turnout. Despite the reelection of incumbent Republican President Dwight Eisenhower, the inexperienced Mikan lost by a close margin of 52% to 48%. Wier received 127,356 votes to Mikan's 117,716. Returning to the legal profession, Mikan was frustrated after hoping for an influx of work. For six months, Mikan did not get any assignments at all, leaving him in financial difficulties that forced him to cash in on his life insurance.

Problems also arose in Mikan's professional sports career. In the 1957–58 NBA season, Lakers coach John Kundla became general manager and persuaded Mikan to become coach of the Lakers. However, this was a failure, as the Lakers endured a 9–30 record until Mikan stepped down and returned coaching duties to Kundla. In one of the worst seasons in the team's history, the Lakers finished the season with a 19–53 record. After this failure, Mikan successfully specialized in corporate and real estate law. He also purchased and renovated buildings in Minneapolis.

In 1967, Mikan returned to professional basketball by becoming the first commissioner of the upstart American Basketball Association, a rival league to the NBA. In order to lure basketball fans to his league, Mikan invented the league's characteristic red-white-and-blue ABA ball, which he thought more patriotic, better suited for television, and more crowd-pleasing than the brown NBA ball. He also instituted a three-point line. It was Mikan who elected to let players such as Doug Moe, Roger Brown, Connie Hawkins, Tony Jackson, and Charlie Williams play in the league, stating years later in Loose Balls that having investigated their situation of being falsely implicated in gambling, each deserved a second chance in his eyes that Mikan never regretted. Mikan resigned from the ABA in 1969, but the league continued to operate until 1976.

In the mid-1980s, nearly 25 years after the Lakers had moved to Los Angeles in 1960 and after the ABA's Minnesota Muskies and Minnesota Pipers had departed, Mikan headed a task force with the goal of returning professional basketball to Minneapolis. This bid was successful, leading to the inception of the new Minnesota Timberwolves franchise in the 1989–90 NBA season.

In 1994, Mikan became the part-owner and chairman of the board of the Chicago Cheetahs, a professional roller hockey team based in Chicago that played in Roller Hockey International. The franchise folded after its second season.

== Electoral history ==
1956 Minnesota's 3rd congressional district Republican primary
Party	Candidate	Votes	%
Republican	George Mikan	30,663	56.34%
Republican	Russell C. Fernstrom	9,858	18.11%
Republican	Victoria K. Joyner	7,040	12.93%
Republican	John G. Alexander	3,792	6.97%
Republican	M. D. Tollefson	1,857	3.41%
Republican	David S. Bledsoe	744	1.37%
Republican	Peter Filips	473	0.87%
Total votes		54,427	100.00%

1956 Minnesota's 3rd congressional district election
Party	Candidate	Votes	%
Democratic (DFL)	Roy Wier (incumbent)	127,356	51.97%
Republican	George Mikan	117,716	48.03%
Total votes		245,072	100.00%
Democratic (DFL) hold			

== Personal life, health, and death ==
In 1947, Mikan married his wife, Patricia, and they remained together for 58 years until his death. The Mikans had six children: sons Larry, Terry, Patrick and Michael and daughters Trisha and Maureen. All his life, Mikan was universally seen as the prototypical "gentle giant"—tough and relentless on the court, but friendly and amicable in private life. He was also the older brother of Ed Mikan, who played basketball for DePaul, played in the BAA, and played for the Philadelphia Warriors of the NBA.

In his later years, Mikan developed diabetes and failing kidneys. Eventually, his right leg was amputated below the knee due to his illness. When his medical insurance was cut off, Mikan found himself in severe financial difficulties. He fought a protracted legal battle against the NBA and the NBA Players' Union, protesting the $1,700/month pensions for players who had retired before 1965 (the start of the so-called "big money era"). According to Mel Davis of the National Basketball Retired Players Union, this battle kept him going because Mikan hoped to be alive when a new collective bargaining agreement would finally vindicate his generation. In 2005, however, his condition worsened. Mikan died in Scottsdale, Arizona, on June 1, 2005, of complications from diabetes and other ailments. His son Terry reported that his father had undergone dialysis three times a week for four hours at a time during the last five years of his life.

== Legacy ==
Mikan's death was widely mourned by the basketball world. His plight also brought media attention to the financial struggles of several early-era NBA players. Many felt that the players of the big-money generation should rally for larger pensions for the pre-1965 predecessors in labor negotiations. Shaquille O'Neal paid for Mikan's funeral, saying: "Without number 99 [Mikan], there is no me." Before Game Five of the 2005 Eastern Conference Finals between the Heat and the Detroit Pistons, there was a moment of silence to honor Mikan. Bob Cousy remarked that Mikan figuratively carried the NBA in the early days and single-handedly made the league credible and popular.

Mikan is lauded as the pioneer of the modern age of basketball. He scored 11,764 points (an average of 22.6 per game) and averaged 13.4 rebounds and 2.8 assists in 520 NBL, BAA and NBA games. As a testament to his fierce playing style, he also led the league three times in personal fouls. Mikan retired as the NBA's all-time leading scorer. He was named the NBL Most Valuable Player in 1948, and was awarded the Sam Davis Memorial Award as professional player of the year by the Metropolitan Basketball Writers Association in 1950 and 1951. He won seven NBL, BAA, and NBA championships, an All-Star MVP trophy, and three scoring titles, and was a member of the first four NBA All-Star games and the first six All-BAA and All-NBA Teams. As well as being declared the greatest player of the first half of the century by The Associated Press, Mikan was on the Helms Athletic Foundation all-time All-American team, chosen in a 1952 poll. He also made the 25th and 35th NBA Anniversary Teams of 1970 and 1980, was chosen as one of the NBA 50 Greatest Players in 1996, and was selected to the NBA 75th Anniversary Team in 2021. Mikan was inducted into the Basketball Hall of Fame in its inaugural 1959 class. Mikan's impact on the game is also reflected in the Mikan Drill, which has become a staple exercise of "big men" in basketball. Mikan was a harbinger of the NBA's future, which would be dominated by tall, powerful players.

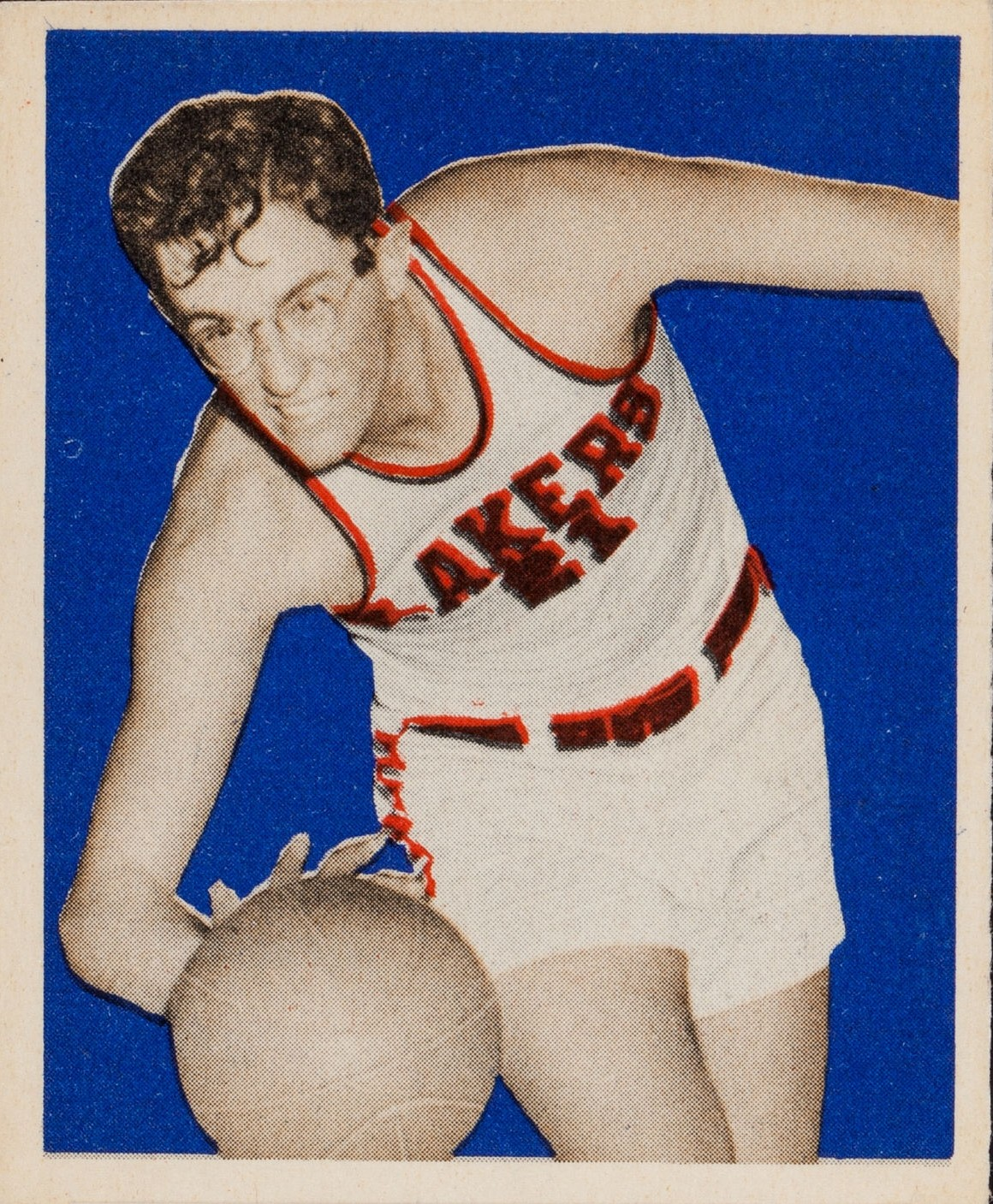
Mikan's record-setting 1948 Bowman card

When superstar center Shaquille O'Neal became a member of the Los Angeles Lakers, Mikan appeared on a Sports Illustrated cover in November 1996 with O'Neal and Kareem Abdul-Jabbar. The article called Abdul-Jabbar and Mikan the "Lakers legends" to whom O'Neal was compared. Since April 2001, a statue of Mikan shooting his trademark hook shot has graced the entrance to the Minnesota Timberwolves' Target Center. In addition, a banner in Crypto.com Arena commemorates Mikan and his fellow Minneapolis Lakers. He is also honored by a statue and an appearance on a mural in his hometown of Joliet, Illinois.

Mikan's 1948 Bowman trading card was at one point the most expensive basketball card ever sold.

In October 2022, Mikan was inaugurated into the Croatian-American Sports Hall of Fame.

On October 30, 2022, the Lakers retired Mikan's No. 99 jersey.

In December 2022, the NBA renamed the Most Improved Player award in his honor.

=== Rule changes ===
Mikan became so dominant that the NBA changed its rules of play in order to reduce his influence. The league widened the lane from six to twelve feet ("The Mikan Rule"). He also played a role in the introduction of the shot clock. In the NCAA, his dominating play around the basket led to the outlawing of defensive goaltending.

As an official, Mikan is also directly responsible for the ABA three-point line which was later adopted by the NBA; the existence of the Minnesota Timberwolves; and the multi-colored ABA ball, which still lives on as the "money ball" in the NBA All-Star Three-Point Contest.

== See also ==
- List of National Basketball Association single-game scoring leaders
- List of National Basketball Association annual scoring leaders
- List of National Basketball Association annual rebounding leaders
- List of NBA players with most championships
- List of Croatian Americans
