= 1951–52 Minneapolis Lakers season =

Pro basketball team season (won NBA championship)

- NBA champions
- Head coach: John Kundla
- Arena: Minneapolis Auditorium

Results
- Record: 40–26 (.606)
- Place: Division: 2nd (Western)
- Playoff finish: NBA champions (Defeated Knickerbockers 4–3)
- Stats at Basketball Reference
- Radio: WLOL

The 1951–52 Minneapolis Lakers season was the fourth season for the franchise in the National Basketball Association (NBA). The NBA widened the foul lane before the 1951–52 season in an attempt to slow down George Mikan. Despite the change, it had little effect on Mikan. He still averaged 23.8 points per game, although he lost the scoring title to Paul Arizin, from the Philadelphia Warriors. The Lakers went into the campaign with essentially the same lineup. Rochester took first place in the Western Division by a game, but the Lakers ousted the Royals in four games in the division finals. The NBA Finals would have the Lakers oppose the New York Knickerbockers. Games 3 and 4 of the Finals were played at the 69th Regiment Armory instead of at Madison Square Garden. This was because of a famous circus being in town at the time. The teams split those games, as well as Games 5 and 6. Game 7 was dominated by Minneapolis. The Lakers pounded out an 82–65 win, at home, to claim their third NBA crown in their first four seasons. HoopsHype later ranked this squad as the team with the 14th easiest route to the NBA Finals championship.

== Roster ==
1951–52 Minneapolis Lakers roster
Players

Pos.	No.	Player	Height	Weight	DOB	From
SG	16	Bob Harrison	6 ft 1 in (1.85 m)	190 lb (86 kg)	August 12, 1927	Michigan
PF	11	Lew Hitch	6 ft 8 in (2.03 m)	200 lb (91 kg)	July 16, 1929	Kansas State
SG	4, 15	Joe Hutton	6 ft 1 in (1.85 m)	170 lb (77 kg)	October 6, 1928	Hamline
PG	22	Slater Martin	5 ft 10 in (1.78 m)	170 lb (77 kg)	October 22, 1925	Texas
C	99	George Mikan	6 ft 10 in (2.08 m)	245 lb (111 kg)	June 18, 1924	DePaul
PF	19	Vern Mikkelsen	6 ft 7 in (2.01 m)	230 lb (104 kg)	October 21, 1928	Hamline
F	18	John Pilch	6 ft 3 in (1.91 m)	185 lb (84 kg)	July 11, 1925	Wyoming
SF	17	Jim Pollard	6 ft 4 in (1.93 m)	185 lb (84 kg)	July 9, 1922	Stanford
SG	18	Pep Saul	6 ft 2 in (1.88 m)	185 lb (84 kg)	February 16, 1924	Seton Hall
PF	12	Howie Schultz	6 ft 6 in (1.98 m)	200 lb (91 kg)	July 3, 1922	Hamline
SG	20	Whitey Skoog	5 ft 11 in (1.80 m)	180 lb (82 kg)	November 2, 1926	Minnesota

Coaches
Head coach
- John Kundla

Legend
- (DP) Unsigned draft pick
- (FA) Free agent
- (S) Suspended
- Injured

Roster

== Regular season ==
=== Season standings ===
Western Division	W	L	PCT	GB	Home	Road	Neutral	Div
x-Rochester Royals	41	25	.621	–	28–5	12–18	1–2	22–14
x-Minneapolis Lakers	40	26	.606	1	21–5	13–20	6–1	24–12
x-Indianapolis Olympians	34	32	.515	7	25–6	4–24	5–2	18–18
x-Fort Wayne Pistons	29	37	.439	12	22–11	6–24	1–2	17–19
Milwaukee Hawks	17	49	.258	24	8–13	3–22	6–14	9–27

=== Game log ===
#	Date	Opponent	Score	High points	Record
1	November 3	@ Rochester	93–74	Vern Mikkelsen (25)	1–0
2	November 4	@ Syracuse	67–98	George Mikan (27)	1–1
3	November 9	@ Philadelphia	86–98	George Mikan (41)	1–2
4	November 10	@ New York	89–73	George Mikan (31)	2–2
5	November 11	@ Boston	72–77	Jim Pollard (17)	2–3
6	November 12	@ Baltimore	90–80	George Mikan (31)	3–3
7	November 13	@ Indianapolis	77–71	George Mikan (22)	4–3
8	November 17	Fort Wayne	64–68 (OT)	George Mikan (32)	5–3
9	November 22	Rochester	65–70 (2OT)	Vern Mikkelsen (21)	6–3
10	November 24	Milwaukee	72–59	George Mikan (19)	7–3
11	November 25	Indianapolis	73–82	George Mikan (31)	8–3
12	November 28	Boston	76–90	George Mikan (34)	9–3
13	December 1	Fort Wayne	69–89	George Mikan (24)	10–3
14	December 2	@ Fort Wayne	61–63	George Mikan (22)	10–4
15	December 5	Syracuse	83–81 (OT)	Vern Mikkelsen (23)	10–5
16	December 8	N Baltimore	85–64	Mikan, Pollard (22)	11–5
17	December 9	Indianapolis	85–78	Vern Mikkelsen (25)	11–6
18	December 11	@ Indianapolis	69–85	Mikan, Mikkelsen (16)	11–7
19	December 12	Baltimore	79–99	George Mikan (25)	12–7
20	December 16	Milwaukee	52–99	George Mikan (24)	13–7
21	December 18	@ New York	67–69	George Mikan (19)	13–8
22	December 21	@ Philadelphia	103–105 (3OT)	George Mikan (36)	13–9
23	December 22	@ Baltimore	96–90 (3OT)	George Mikan (39)	14–9
24	December 23	@ Fort Wayne	79–81	George Mikan (33)	14–10
25	December 25	Boston	93–100	Jim Pollard (25)	15–10
26	December 30	Philadelphia	64–93	George Mikan (22)	16–10
27	January 1	Syracuse	80–82	George Mikan (37)	17–10
28	January 4	N Fort Wayne	79–64	Mikan, Pollard (21)	18–10
29	January 5	N Indianapolis	86–65	George Mikan (20)	19–10
30	January 6	New York	92–107	Jim Pollard (32)	20–10
31	January 8	@ Indianapolis	75–82	George Mikan (27)	20–11
32	January 9	Indianapolis	74–91	George Mikan (29)	21–11
33	January 11	@ Milwaukee	75–63	George Mikan (18)	22–11
34	January 12	N Milwaukee	96–84	Jim Pollard (24)	23–11
35	January 13	Philadelphia	88–81	George Mikan (33)	23–12
36	January 16	@ Boston	108–94	Vern Mikkelsen (36)	24–12
37	January 17	@ Syracuse	105–110 (3OT)	Martin, Mikkelsen (19)	24–13
38	January 19	@ Rochester	85–96	Slater Martin (20)	24–14
39	January 20	Rochester	81–91 (2OT)	George Mikan (61)	25–14
40	January 23	Syracuse	99–97 (OT)	George Mikan (28)	25–15
41	January 26	@ Milwaukee	57–56	Jim Pollard (18)	26–15
42	January 27	Milwaukee	62–91	Vern Mikkelsen (19)	27–15
43	January 30	New York	65–77	Martin, Pollard (14)	28–15
44	January 31	@ Fort Wayne	85–78	Mikan, Pollard (23)	29–15
45	February 1	@ Indianapolis	77–85	George Mikan (25)	29–16
46	February 3	Rochester	75–77	George Mikan (25)	30–16
47	February 7	Rochester	75–86	George Mikan (27)	31–16
48	February 9	Fort Wayne	70–67	George Mikan (29)	31–17
49	February 10	@ Milwaukee	69–70 (2OT)	Frank Saul (14)	31–18
50	February 14	N Milwaukee	109–74	Jim Pollard (25)	32–18
51	February 16	N Boston	75–77	Slater Martin (17)	32–19
52	February 17	@ Fort Wayne	87–99	Howie Schultz (19)	32–20
53	February 19	@ New York	96–98	George Mikan (26)	32–21
54	February 20	@ Baltimore	93–78	Vern Mikkelsen (28)	33–21
55	February 21	@ Syracuse	80–88	George Mikan (25)	33–22
56	February 23	@ Rochester	83–73	George Mikan (26)	34–22
57	February 24	@ Fort Wayne	70–83	Jim Pollard (19)	34–23
58	February 25	Philadelphia	95–108	George Mikan (28)	35–23
59	March 1	N Indianapolis	98–88	George Mikan (26)	36–23
60	March 2	@ Milwaukee	96–85	Jim Pollard (26)	37–23
61	March 4	@ Philadelphia	81–83	George Mikan (41)	37–24
62	March 5	@ Boston	74–82	Slater Martin (20)	37–25
63	March 8	@ Rochester	92–94 (OT)	Mikan, Pollard (21)	37–26
64	March 9	Rochester	90–96	Jim Pollard (32)	38–26
65	March 12	New York	83–85	Jim Pollard (22)	39–26
66	March 16	Baltimore	82–126	Vern Mikkelsen (23)	40–26

== Player stats ==
Note: GP= Games played; REB= Rebounds; AST= Assists; STL = Steals; BLK = Blocks; PTS = Points; AVG = Average

Player	GP	REB	AST	STL	BLK	PTS	AVG

== Playoffs ==
1952 playoff game log
Division Semi-finals: 2–0 (home: 1–0; road: 1–0)

Game	Date	Team	Score	High points	Location	Series
1	March 23	Indianapolis	W 78–70	George Mikan (24)	Minneapolis Auditorium	1–0
2	March 25	@ Indianapolis	W 94–87	George Mikan (36)	Butler Fieldhouse	2–0

Division Finals: 3–1 (home: 2–0; road: 1–1)

Game	Date	Team	Score	High points	Location	Series
1	March 29	@ Rochester	L 78–88	George Mikan (47)	Edgerton Park Arena	0–1
2	March 30	@ Rochester	W 83–78 (OT)	Vern Mikkelsen (19)	Edgerton Park Arena	1–1
3	April 5	Rochester	W 77–67	Jim Pollard (22)	Minneapolis Auditorium	2–1
4	April 6	Rochester	W 82–80	Saul, Mikkelsen (18)	Minneapolis Auditorium	3–1

NBA Finals: 4–3 (home: 3–1; road: 1–2)

Game	Date	Team	Score	High points	High rebounds	High assists	Location Attendance	Series
1	April 12	New York	W 83–79 (OT)	Jim Pollard (34)	George Mikan (16)	Pollard, Mikan (4)	St. Paul Auditorium; 8,722	1–0
2	April 13	New York	L 72–80	George Mikan (18)	George Mikan (21)	Slater Martin (4)	St. Paul Auditorium	1–1
3	April 16	@ New York	W 82–77	George Mikan (26)	George Mikan (17)	Pep Saul (8)	69th Regiment Armory; 4,500	2–1
4	April 18	@ New York	L 89–90 (OT)	Slater Martin (32)	George Mikan (17)	Pep Saul (5)	69th Regiment Armory; 5,200	2–2
5	April 20	New York	W 102–89	Mikkelsen, Mikan (32)	George Mikan (17)	Pep Saul (5)	St. Paul Auditorium; 7,244	3–2
6	April 23	@ New York	L 68–76	George Mikan (28)	George Mikan (15)	Slater Martin (9)	69th Regiment Armory; 3,000	3–3
7	April 25	New York	W 82–65	George Mikan (22)	George Mikan (19)	Slater Martin (6)	Minneapolis Auditorium; 8,612	4–3

1952 schedule

== Awards and honors ==
- George Mikan, All-NBA First Team
- Vern Mikkelsen, All-NBA Second Team
- Jim Pollard, All-NBA Second Team
- George Mikan, NBA All-Star Game
- Vern Mikkelsen, NBA All-Star Game
- Jim Pollard, NBA All-Star Game
