= 1951–52 NBA season =

Sixth NBA season

- League: National Basketball Association
- Sport: Basketball
- Duration: November 1, 1951 – March 16, 1952; March 18 – April 8, 1952 (Playoffs); April 12–25, 1952 (Finals)
- Games: 66
- Teams: 10

Draft
- Top draft pick: Gene Melchiorre
- Picked by: Baltimore Bullets

Regular season
- Top seed: Rochester Royals
- Top scorer: Paul Arizin (Philadelphia)

Playoffs
- Eastern champions: New York Knicks
- Eastern runners-up: Syracuse Nationals
- Western champions: Minneapolis Lakers
- Western runners-up: Rochester Royals

Finals
- Champions: Minneapolis Lakers
- Runners-up: New York Knicks

NBA seasons
- ← 1950–51 1952–53 →

The 1951–52 NBA season was the sixth season of the National Basketball Association. The season ended with the Minneapolis Lakers winning the NBA championship, beating the New York Knicks 4 games to 3 in the NBA Finals.

== Notable occurrences ==
- The Tri-Cities Blackhawks relocated from the "Tri-Cities" area (Moline, Illinois, Rock Island, Illinois & Davenport, Iowa) to Milwaukee, Wisconsin and became the Milwaukee Hawks.
- The 1952 NBA All-Star Game was played in Boston, Massachusetts, with the East beating the West 108–91. Paul Arizin of the Philadelphia Warriors won the game's MVP award.

Coaching changes
Offseason
Team	1950–51 coach	1951–52 coach
Baltimore Bullets	Walt Budko	Fred Scolari
Fort Wayne Pistons	Murray Mendenhall	Paul Birch
Indianapolis Olympians	Wally Jones	Herm Schaefer
In-season
Team	Outgoing coach	Incoming coach
Baltimore Bullets	Fred Scolari	Chick Reiser

== Final standings ==
=== Eastern Division ===
Eastern Division	W	L	PCT	GB	Home	Road	Neutral	Div
x-Syracuse Nationals	40	26	.606	–	26–7	12–18	2–1	21–15
x-Boston Celtics	39	27	.591	1	22–7	10–19	7–1	22–14
x-New York Knicks	37	29	.561	3	21–4	12–22	4–3	23–13
x-Philadelphia Warriors	33	33	.500	7	24–7	6–25	3–1	14–22
Baltimore Bullets	20	46	.303	20	17–15	2–22	1–9	10–26

=== Western Division ===
Western Division	W	L	PCT	GB	Home	Road	Neutral	Div
x-Rochester Royals	41	25	.621	–	28–5	12–18	1–2	22–14
x-Minneapolis Lakers	40	26	.606	1	21–5	13–20	6–1	24–12
x-Indianapolis Olympians	34	32	.515	7	25–6	4–24	5–2	18–18
x-Fort Wayne Pistons	29	37	.439	12	22–11	6–24	1–2	17–19
Milwaukee Hawks	17	49	.258	24	8–13	3–22	6–14	9–27

x – Clinched playoff spot

== Playoffs ==
Division Semifinals
E1	Syracuse*	2
E4	Philadelphia	1
Eastern Division
E3	New York	2
E2	Boston	1
W1	Rochester*	2
W4	Fort Wayne	0
Western Division
W3	Indianapolis	0
W2	Minneapolis	2

Division Finals
E1	Syracuse*	1
E3	New York	3
W1	Rochester*	1
W2	Minneapolis	3

NBA Finals
E3	New York	3
W2	Minneapolis	4

- * Division winner
- Bold Series winner
- Italic Team with home-court advantage in NBA Finals

== Statistics leaders ==
Category	Player	Team	Stat
Points	Paul Arizin	Philadelphia Warriors	1,674
Rebounds	Larry Foust; Mel Hutchins	Fort Wayne Pistons; Milwaukee Hawks	880
Assists	Andy Phillip	Philadelphia Warriors	539
FG%	Paul Arizin	Philadelphia Warriors	.448
FT%	Bobby Wanzer	Rochester Royals	.904

Note: Prior to the 1969–70 season, league leaders in points, rebounds, and assists were determined by totals rather than averages.

== NBA awards ==
- All-NBA First Team:
  - Paul Arizin, Philadelphia Warriors
  - Bob Cousy, Boston Celtics
  - Ed Macauley, Boston Celtics
  - Bob Davies, Rochester Royals
  - Dolph Schayes, Syracuse Nationals
  - George Mikan, Minneapolis Lakers
- All-NBA Second Team:
  - Larry Foust, Fort Wayne Pistons
  - Vern Mikkelsen, Minneapolis Lakers
  - Andy Phillip, Philadelphia Warriors
  - Jim Pollard, Minneapolis Lakers
  - Bobby Wanzer, Rochester Royals
- NBA Rookie of the Year
  - G Bill Tosheff, Indianapolis Olympians & F/C Mel Hutchins, Milwaukee Hawks

== See also ==
- List of NBA regular season records
