= List of 1952–53 NBA season transactions =

== Events ==
=== July 30, 1952 ===
- The Boston Celtics signed Kenny Rollins as a free agent.

=== August 8, 1952 ===
- The Milwaukee Hawks sold Cal Christensen to the Rochester Royals.

=== August 9, 1952 ===
- The Milwaukee Hawks hired Andrew Levane as head coach.

=== September 11, 1952 ===
The Indianapolis Olympians traded Don Lofgran to the Philadelphia Warriors for Mel Payton.

=== October 9, 1952 ===
- The Baltimore Bullets traded Bill Calhoun to the Syracuse Nationals for George Ratkovicz.

=== November 12, 1952 ===
- The Baltimore Bullets fired Chick Reiser as head coach.
- The Baltimore Bullets hired Clair Bee as head coach.

=== November 17, 1952 ===
- The Boston Celtics sold Kleggie Hermsen to the Indianapolis Olympians.

=== November 19, 1952 ===
- The Milwaukee Hawks traded Mark Workman to the Philadelphia Warriors for Don Sunderlage.

=== November 20, 1952 ===
- The New York Knicks sold George Kaftan to the Baltimore Bullets.

=== November 24, 1952 ===
- The Milwaukee Hawks traded Eddie Miller to the Baltimore Bullets for George Ratkovicz.

=== November 25, 1952 ===
- The Syracuse Nationals sold Jim Brasco to the Milwaukee Hawks.

=== November 28, 1952 ===
- The New York Knicks traded Ray Lumpp to the Baltimore Bullets for cash.
- The Philadelphia Warriors sold Andy Phillip to the Fort Wayne Pistons.

=== December 1, 1952 ===
- The Baltimore Bullets sold Frank Kudelka to the Philadelphia Warriors.

=== December 2, 1952 ===
- The Syracuse Nationals sold Bill Calhoun to the Milwaukee Hawks.

=== December 11, 1952 ===
- The Philadelphia Warriors sold Ed Mikan to the Indianapolis Olympians.
- The New York Knicks sold Ralph Polson to the Philadelphia Warriors.

=== January 2, 1953 ===
- The Milwaukee Hawks traded Don Boven, Pete Darcey and George McLeod to the Baltimore Bullets for Stan Miasek and Dave Minor.

=== January 14, 1953 ===
- The Indianapolis Olympians waived Ralph O'Brien.

=== January 19, 1953 ===
- The Fort Wayne Pistons claimed Ralph O'Brien on waivers from the Indianapolis Olympians.

=== January 20, 1953 ===
- The Philadelphia Warriors waived Frank Kudelka.
- The Philadelphia Warriors waived Jerry Fleishman.

=== February 16, 1953 ===
- The Baltimore Bullets traded Don Boven and Fred Scolari to the Fort Wayne Pistons for Jack Kerris and Ralph O'Brien.

=== April 7, 1953 ===
- The New York Knicks signed Jerry Fleishman as a free agent.

=== May ?, 1953 ===
- The Baltimore Bullets selected Leo Barnhorst from the Indianapolis Olympians in the dispersal draft.
- The Philadelphia Warriors selected Joe Graboski from the Indianapolis Olympians in the dispersal draft.
- The Milwaukee Hawks selected Bob Lavoy from the Indianapolis Olympians in the dispersal draft.
- The Milwaukee Hawks selected Bill Tosheff from the Indianapolis Olympians in the dispersal draft.
- The Philadelphia Warriors selected Paul Walther from the Indianapolis Olympians in the dispersal draft.

== Notes ==
- ^{a} Number of years played in the NBA prior to the draft
- ^{b} Career with the franchise that drafted the player
- ^{c} Never played a game for the franchise
