= George McLeod (basketball) =

American basketball player (1931–2021)

Personal information
- Born: January 3, 1931 Greenville, Texas, U.S.
- Died: January 15, 2023 (aged 92)
- Listed height: 6 ft 7 in (2.01 m)
- Listed weight: 200 lb (91 kg)

Career information
- College: TCU (1949–1952)
- NBA draft: 1952: 5th round, 40th overall pick
- Drafted by: Milwaukee Hawks
- Playing career: 1952–1953
- Position: Forward
- Number: 10

Career history
- 1953: Baltimore Bullets

Career NBA statistics
- Points: 12 (1.2 ppg)
- Rebounds: 21 (2.1 rpg)
- Assists: 4 (0.4 apg)
- Stats at NBA.com
- Stats at Basketball Reference

George Lee McLeod (January 3, 1931 – January 15, 2023) was an American basketball player. A forward, he played in the National Basketball Association (NBA), and was drafted by the Milwaukee Hawks in the 1952 NBA draft. In 1953, he was traded along with Don Boven and Pete Darcey to the Baltimore Bullets for Stan Miasek and Dave Minor.

McLeod died on January 15, 2023, at the age of 92.

== Career statistics ==
Legend
GP	Games played	GS	Games started	MPG	Minutes per game
FG%	Field goal percentage	3P%	3-point field goal percentage	FT%	Free throw percentage
RPG	Rebounds per game	APG	Assists per game	SPG	Steals per game
BPG	Blocks per game	PPG	Points per game	**Bold**	Career high

=== NBA ===
==== Regular season ====
Year	Team	GP	MPG	FG%	FT%	RPG	APG	PPG
1952–53	Baltimore	10	8.5	.125	.533	2.1	.4	1.2
