= 1951–52 New York Knicks season =

Season of National Basketball Association team the New York Knicks

- Head coach: Joe Lapchick
- General manager: Ned Irish
- Arena: Madison Square Garden

Results
- Record: 37–29 (.561)
- Place: Division: 3rd (Eastern)
- Playoff finish: NBA Finals (lost to Lakers 3–4)
- Stats at Basketball Reference

Local media
- Television: WPIX
- Radio: WMGM

The 1951–52 New York Knickerbockers season was the sixth season for the team in the National Basketball Association (NBA). The Knickerbockers finished third in the Eastern Division with a 37–29 record, and advanced to the NBA Playoffs for the sixth consecutive season.

In the first round of the Eastern Division playoffs, the Knickerbockers defeated the Boston Celtics in a best-of-three series, two games to one, to move on to the Eastern Division finals. New York won 3–1 in a best-of-five series with the Syracuse Nationals to reach its second straight NBA Finals. In the Finals, the Knickerbockers lost to the Minneapolis Lakers in seven games. The Knickerbockers became the first NBA team to erase a 3–0 deficit in a best-of-seven series and force a deciding game 7.

== NBA draft ==
Note: This is not an extensive list; it only covers the first and second rounds, and any other players picked by the franchise that played at least one game in the league.

Round	Pick	Player	Position	Nationality	School/Club team
1	6	Ed Smith	F	United States	Harvard
2	15	Roland Minson	G	United States	Brigham Young
6	55	Al McGuire	G/F	United States	St. John's

== Roster ==
1951-52 New York Knicks roster
Players

Pos.	No.	Player	Height	Weight	DOB	From
SF	12	Vince Boryla	6 ft 5 in (1.96 m)	210 lb (95 kg)	1927-03-11	Denver
PF	8	Nat Clifton	6 ft 6 in (1.98 m)	220 lb (100 kg)	1922-10-13	Xavier (LA)
PF	11	Harry Gallatin	6 ft 6 in (1.98 m)	210 lb (95 kg)	1927-04-26	Truman State
SF	6, 17	George Kaftan	6 ft 3 in (1.91 m)	190 lb (86 kg)	1928-02-22	Holy Cross
SG	7	Ray Lumpp	6 ft 1 in (1.85 m)	178 lb (81 kg)	1923-07-11	NYU
PG	3, 16	Al McGuire	6 ft 2 in (1.88 m)	180 lb (82 kg)	1928-09-07	St. John's
PG	15	Dick McGuire	6 ft 0 in (1.83 m)	180 lb (82 kg)	1926-01-25	St. John's
C	19, 22	Herb Scherer	6 ft 9 in (2.06 m)	212 lb (96 kg)	1928-12-21	Long Island
C	18	Connie Simmons	6 ft 8 in (2.03 m)	222 lb (101 kg)	1925-03-15	Flushing High School
SF	9	Ernie Vandeweghe	6 ft 3 in (1.91 m)	195 lb (88 kg)	1928-09-12	Colgate
SG	10	Max Zaslofsky	6 ft 2 in (1.88 m)	170 lb (77 kg)	1925-12-07	St. John's

Coaches
Head coach
- Joe Lapchick

Legend
- (DP) Unsigned draft pick
- (FA) Free agent
- (S) Suspended
- Injured

Roster

== Regular season ==
=== Season standings ===
Eastern Division	W	L	PCT	GB	Home	Road	Neutral	Div
x-Syracuse Nationals	40	26	.606	–	26–7	12–18	2–1	21–15
x-Boston Celtics	39	27	.591	1	22–7	10–19	7–1	22–14
x-New York Knicks	37	29	.561	3	21–4	12–22	4–3	23–13
x-Philadelphia Warriors	33	33	.500	7	24–7	6–25	3–1	14–22
Baltimore Bullets	20	46	.303	20	17–15	2–22	1–9	10–26

x = clinched playoff spot

=== Game log ===
1951–52 game log
#	Date	Opponent	Score	High points	Record
1	November 3	@ Milwaukee	68–66	Vince Boryla (25)	1–0
2	November 4	@ Fort Wayne	75–84	Vince Boryla (23)	1–1
3	November 6	@ Indianapolis	83–73	Harry Gallatin (19)	2–1
4	November 10	Minneapolis	89–73	Nathaniel Clifton (15)	2–2
5	November 11	@ Rochester	78–80	Ray Lumpp (22)	2–3
6	November 13	@ Philadelphia	85–82	Max Zaslofsky (19)	3–3
7	November 17	Syracuse	79–72	Ernie Vandeweghe (17)	3–4
8	November 18	@ Boston	93–87	Ernie Vandeweghe (21)	4–4
9	November 20	N Baltimore	88–86	Max Zaslofsky (21)	5–4
10	November 22	Philadelphia	88–102	Nathaniel Clifton (23)	6–4
11	November 24	Boston	70–68	Max Zaslofsky (14)	6–5
12	November 23	@ Syracuse	73–100	Vince Boryla (19)	6–6
13	November 27	@ Philadelphia	81–83	Nathaniel Clifton (22)	6–7
14	November 29	Rochester	78–74	Nathaniel Clifton (17)	6–8
15	December 1	@ Baltimore	82–84	Max Zaslofsky (20)	6–9
16	December 2	Philadelphia	72–86	Vince Boryla (30)	7–9
17	December 7	@ Philadelphia	91–93	Boryla, Gallatin (19)	7–10
18	December 9	@ Boston	94–103	Dick McGuire (20)	7–11
19	December 11	Milwaukee	83–88	Gallatin, Zaslofsky (19)	8–11
20	December 14	@ Indianapolis	79–83	Max Zaslofsky (21)	8–12
21	December 16	@ Fort Wayne	80–71	Max Zaslofsky (16)	9–12
22	December 18	Minneapolis	86–77	Max Zaslofsky (14)	10–12
23	December 22	Syracuse	73–92	Dick McGuire (21)	11–12
24	December 23	@ Syracuse	75–72	Harry Gallatin (19)	12–12
25	December 25	Fort Wayne	65–72	Max Zaslofsky (23)	13–12
26	December 26	N Milwaukee	76–78	Vince Boryla (16)	13–13
27	December 27	@ Rochester	85–98	Connie Simmons (20)	13–14
28	December 30	@ Boston	90–100	Connie Simmons (16)	13–15
29	December 31	Boston	86–87 (OT)	Max Zaslofsky (30)	14–15
30	January 1	@ Milwaukee	68–65	Vince Boryla (16)	15–15
31	January 2	N Milwaukee	89–67	Max Zaslofsky (27)	16–15
32	January 4	@ Indianapolis	73–83	Dick McGuire (15)	16–16
33	January 6	@ Minneapolis	92–107	Max Zaslofsky (18)	16–17
34	January 8	Rochester	74–107	Ernie Vandeweghe (18)	17–17
35	January 10	@ Syracuse	96–110	Connie Simmons (15)	17–18
36	January 12	Indianapolis	77–86	Harry Gallatin (23)	18–18
37	January 13	@ Rochester	70–97	Dick McGuire (15)	18–19
38	January 19	Philadelphia	88–94	Vandeweghe, Zaslofsky (20)	19–19
39	January 21	@ Baltimore	99–83	Dick McGuire (22)	20–19
40	January 22	@ Philadelphia	82–78	Simmons, Zaslofsky (17)	21–19
41	January 26	Indianapolis	93–99	Connie Simmons (25)	22–19
42	January 27	@ Fort Wayne	92–100	Max Zaslofsky (25)	22–20
43	January 29	N Indianapolis	72–100	George Kaftan (13)	22–21
44	January 30	@ Minneapolis	65–77	Max Zaslofsky (14)	22–22
45	February 2	Boston	83–91	Dick McGuire (21)	23–22
46	February 3	@ Boston	95–100	Harry Gallatin (23)	23–23
47	February 4	@ Baltimore	81–82	Nathaniel Clifton (16)	23–24
48	February 6	Baltimore	70–73	McGuire, Zaslofsky (14)	24–24
49	February 8	N Baltimore	103–83	Ray Lumpp (23)	25–24
50	February 9	Philadelphia	86–96	Connie Simmons (18)	26–24
51	February 12	Syracuse	69–78	Connie Simmons (15)	27–24
52	February 16	Baltimore	82–102	Max Zaslofsky (26)	28–24
53	February 17	@ Syracuse	61–66	Harry Gallatin (11)	28–25
54	February 19	Minneapolis	96–98	Max Zaslofsky (23)	29–25
55	February 22	@ Philadelphia	95–118	Harry Gallatin (22)	29–26
56	February 23	Fort Wayne	77–82 (OT)	Max Zaslofsky (24)	30–26
57	February 25	@ Baltimore	89–84	Dick McGuire (17)	31–26
58	March 1	Boston	84–78	Ernie Vandeweghe (22)	32–26
59	March 2	@ Boston	89–87	Harry Gallatin (21)	33–26
60	March 4	Rochester	90–92 (OT)	George Kaftan (30)	34–26
61	March 5	N Baltimore	88–82	Simmons, Zaslofsky (19)	35–26
62	March 8	N Milwaukee	99–103	Max Zaslofsky (24)	35–27
63	March 9	@ Fort Wayne	79–80	Harry Gallatin (25)	35–28
64	March 12	@ Minneapolis	83–85	Harry Gallatin (19)	35–29
65	March 15	Syracuse	90–97	Harry Gallatin (24)	36–29
66	March 16	@ Syracuse	90–84	Ernie Vandeweghe (19)	37–29

== Playoffs ==
1952 playoff game log
Division semifinals: 2–1 (home: 1–0; road: 1–1)

Game	Date	Team	Score	High points	High assists	Location	Series
1	March 19	@ Boston	L 94–105	Max Zaslofsky (20)	Dick McGuire (7)	Boston Garden	0–1
2	March 23	Boston	W 101–97	Connie Simmons (22)	Dick McGuire (7)	Madison Square Garden III	1–1
3	March 26	@ Boston	W 88–87 (2OT)	Max Zaslofsky (21)	Dick McGuire (9)	Boston Garden	2–1

Division finals: 3–1 (home: 2–0; road: 1–1)

Game	Date	Team	Score	High points	Location	Series
1	April 2	@ Syracuse	W 87–85	Max Zaslofsky (26)	Onondaga War Memorial	1–0
2	April 3	@ Syracuse	L 92–102	Harry Gallatin (16)	Onondaga War Memorial	1–1
3	April 5	Syracuse	W 99–92	Max Zaslofsky (20)	Madison Square Garden III	2–1
4	April 6	Syracuse	W 100–93	Max Zaslofsky (20)	Madison Square Garden III	3–1

NBA Finals: 3–4 (home: 2–1; road: 1–3)

Game	Date	Team	Score	High points	High rebounds	High assists	Location Attendance	Series
1	April 12	@ Minneapolis	L 79–83 (OT)	Simmons, McGuire (15)	Nat Clifton (12)	Dick McGuire (5)	St. Paul Auditorium; 8,722	0–1
2	April 13	@ Minneapolis	W 80–72	Harry Gallatin (18)	Harry Gallatin (11)	Dick McGuire (5)	St. Paul Auditorium	1–1
3	April 16	Minneapolis	L 77–82	Max Zaslofsky (17)	Nat Clifton (10)	Dick McGuire (10)	69th Regiment Armory; 4,500	1–2
4	April 18	Minneapolis	W 90–89 (OT)	Connie Simmons (30)	Nat Clifton (12)	Dick McGuire (6)	69th Regiment Armory; 5,200	2–2
5	April 20	@ Minneapolis	L 89–102	Nat Clifton (17)	Clifton, Gallatin (8)	six players tied (1)	St. Paul Auditorium; 7,244	2–3
6	April 23	Minneapolis	W 76–68	Max Zaslofsky (23)	Harry Gallatin (13)	Ernie Vandeweghe (7)	69th Regiment Armory; 3,000	3–3
7	April 25	@ Minneapolis	L 65–82	Max Zaslofsky (21)	Nat Clifton (10)	Nat Clifton (3)	Minneapolis Auditorium; 8,612	3–4

1952 schedule

== See also ==
- 1951–52 NBA season
