= 1951–52 Philadelphia Warriors season =

NBA professional basketball team season

- Head coach: Edward Gottlieb
- Arena: Philadelphia Arena

Results
- Record: 33–33 (.500)
- Place: Division: 4th (Eastern)
- Playoff finish: East Division Semifinals (eliminated 1–2)
- Stats at Basketball Reference
- Radio: WCAU

The 1951–52 Philadelphia Warriors season was the Warriors' 6th season in the NBA.

== Offseason ==
=== Draft picks ===
| Round | Pick | Player | Position | Nationality | College |

== Regular season ==
=== Season standings ===
| Eastern Division | W | L | PCT | GB | Home | Road | Neutral | Div |
|---|---|---|---|---|---|---|---|---|
| x-Syracuse Nationals | 40 | 26 | .606 | – | 26–7 | 12–18 | 2–1 | 21–15 |
| x-Boston Celtics | 39 | 27 | .591 | 1 | 22–7 | 10–19 | 7–1 | 22–14 |
| x-New York Knicks | 37 | 29 | .561 | 3 | 21–4 | 12–22 | 4–3 | 23–13 |
| x-Philadelphia Warriors | 33 | 33 | .500 | 7 | 24–7 | 6–25 | 3–1 | 14–22 |
| Baltimore Bullets | 20 | 46 | .303 | 20 | 17–15 | 2–22 | 1–9 | 10–26 |

x – clinched playoff spot

=== Game log ===
1951–52 Game log
| # | Date | Opponent | Score | High points | Record |
| 1 | November 3 | Fort Wayne | 70–69 | Paul Arizin (22) | 1–0 |
| 2 | November 5 | @ Baltimore | 90–96 | Paul Arizin (23) | 1–1 |
| 3 | November 9 | Minneapolis | 98–86 | Paul Arizin (29) | 2–1 |
| 4 | November 10 | vs. Boston | 69–83 | Paul Arizin (29) | 2–2 |
| 5 | November 13 | New York | 82–85 | Arizin, Fulks (28) | 2–3 |
| 6 | November 16 | Syracuse | 90–97 | Paul Arizin (26) | 2–4 |
| 7 | November 17 | @ Rochester | 72–86 | Paul Arizin (19) | 2–5 |
| 8 | November 20 | Milwaukee | 80–64 | Paul Arizin (18) | 3–5 |
| 9 | November 22 | @ New York | 88–102 | Paul Arizin (32) | 3–6 |
| 10 | November 23 | Boston | 100–102 (OT) | Paul Arizin (28) | 3–7 |
| 11 | November 24 | @ Baltimore | 74–81 | Ed Mikan (18) | 3–8 |
| 12 | November 25 | @ Boston | 85–103 | Neil Johnston (18) | 3–9 |
| 13 | November 27 | New York | 83–81 | Ed Mikan (20) | 4–9 |
| 14 | November 30 | Syracuse | 82–75 | Paul Arizin (30) | 5–9 |
| 15 | December 2 | @ New York | 72–86 | Joe Fulks (27) | 5–10 |
| 16 | December 4 | Rochester | 96–80 | Joe Fulks (26) | 6–10 |
| 17 | December 7 | @ New York | 93–91 | Paul Arizin (23) | 7–10 |
| 18 | December 9 | @ Syracuse | 74–93 | Paul Arizin (15) | 7–11 |
| 19 | December 11 | Boston | 79–78 | Paul Arizin (28) | 8–11 |
| 20 | December 14 | Fort Wayne | 72–62 | Paul Arizin (35) | 9–11 |
| 21 | December 16 | @ Boston | 79–83 (OT) | Joe Fulks (29) | 9–12 |
| 22 | December 18 | vs. Baltimore | 82–78 | Andy Phillip (23) | 10–12 |
| 23 | December 21 | Minneapolis | 105–103 (3OT) | Paul Arizin (34) | 11–12 |
| 24 | December 22 | @ Rochester | 89–105 | Joe Fulks (30) | 11–13 |
| 25 | December 26 | @ Baltimore | 99–103 (3OT) | Paul Arizin (22) | 11–14 |
| 26 | December 29 | @ Milwaukee | 68–61 | Paul Arizin (25) | 12–14 |
| 27 | December 30 | @ Minneapolis | 64–93 | Paul Arizin (24) | 12–15 |
| 28 | January 1 | @ Fort Wayne | 74–89 | Paul Arizin (19) | 12–16 |
| 29 | January 4 | Baltimore | 92–79 | Paul Arizin (23) | 13–16 |
| 30 | January 5 | @ Rochester | 94–103 | Paul Arizin (26) | 13–17 |
| 31 | January 6 | @ Syracuse | 93–98 | Nelson Bobb (22) | 13–18 |
| 32 | January 11 | Rochester | 85–83 | Paul Arizin (27) | 14–18 |
| 33 | January 13 | @ Minneapolis | 98–73 | Arizin, Fulks (27) | 15–18 |
| 34 | January 15 | @ Indianapolis | 68–101 | Paul Arizin (22) | 15–19 |
| 35 | January 17 | @ Fort Wayne | 78–82 | Paul Arizin (20) | 15–20 |
| 36 | January 18 | Indianapolis | 98–83 | Paul Arizin (20) | 16–20 |
| 37 | January 19 | @ New York | 88–94 | Paul Arizin (29) | 16–21 |
| 38 | January 22 | New York | 78–82 | Joe Fulks (33) | 16–22 |
| 39 | January 25 | Syracuse | 95–94 (OT) | Paul Arizin (22) | 17–22 |
| 40 | January 26 | @ Boston | 89–85 | Paul Arizin (30) | 18–22 |
| 41 | January 29 | Boston | 97–96 | Paul Arizin (32) | 19–22 |
| 42 | February 1 | Baltimore | 81–79 | Paul Arizin (25) | 20–22 |
| 43 | February 3 | @ Milwaukee | 73–83 | Paul Arizin (19) | 20–23 |
| 44 | February 5 | @ Indianapolis | 85–94 | Paul Arizin (32) | 20–24 |
| 45 | February 7 | @ Fort Wayne | 105–91 | Joe Fulks (36) | 21–24 |
| 46 | February 8 | Syracuse | 87–96 | Paul Arizin (31) | 21–25 |
| 47 | February 9 | @ New York | 86–96 | Paul Arizin (31) | 21–26 |
| 48 | February 10 | @ Syracuse | 84–91 | Paul Arizin (20) | 21–27 |
| 49 | February 12 | Rochester | 75–86 | Paul Arizin (26) | 21–28 |
| 50 | February 15 | Indianapolis | 112–91 | Paul Arizin (26) | 22–28 |
| 51 | February 17 | @ Baltimore | 90–83 | Paul Arizin (29) | 23–28 |
| 52 | February 19 | Fort Wayne | 98–80 | Paul Arizin (28) | 24–28 |
| 53 | February 22 | New York | 118–95 | Paul Arizin (36) | 25–28 |
| 54 | February 24 | vs. Milwaukee | 76–71 | Paul Arizin (21) | 26–28 |
| 55 | February 25 | @ Minneapolis | 95–108 | Paul Arizin (36) | 26–29 |
| 56 | February 26 | @ Indianapolis | 88–86 | Paul Arizin (31) | 27–29 |
| 57 | February 27 | Indianapolis | 97–89 | Paul Arizin (25) | 28–29 |
| 58 | February 29 | Baltimore | 103–86 | Paul Arizin (40) | 29–29 |
| 59 | March 1 | @ Baltimore | 77–90 | Paul Arizin (28) | 29–30 |
| 60 | March 4 | Minneapolis | 83–81 | Paul Arizin (27) | 30–30 |
| 61 | March 8 | Syracuse | 92–83 | Paul Arizin (31) | 31–30 |
| 62 | March 9 | @ Syracuse | 82–99 | Paul Arizin (30) | 31–31 |
| 63 | March 11 | Boston | 84–88 | Paul Arizin (27) | 31–32 |
| 64 | March 14 | Milwaukee | 85–82 | Paul Arizin (22) | 32–32 |
| 65 | March 15 | vs. Milwaukee | 105–86 | Paul Arizin (38) | 33–32 |
| 66 | March 16 | @ Boston | 89–96 | Paul Arizin (21) | 33–33 |

== Playoffs ==
1952 playoff game log
Division Semifinals: 1–2 (home: 1–0; road: 0–2)

| Game | Date | Team | Score | High points | High rebounds | High assists | Location | Series |
|---|---|---|---|---|---|---|---|---|
| 1 | March 20 | @ Syracuse | L 83–102 | Paul Arizin (22) | Paul Arizin (13) | Andy Phillip (6) | Onondaga War Memorial | 0–1 |
| 2 | March 22 | Syracuse | W 100–95 | Paul Arizin (29) | Paul Arizin (10) | Andy Phillip (9) | Philadelphia Arena | 1–1 |
| 3 | March 23 | @ Syracuse | L 73–84 | Paul Arizin (26) | Paul Arizin (15) | Andy Phillip (7) | Onondaga War Memorial | 1–2 |

1952 schedule

== Awards and records ==
- Paul Arizin, NBA All-Star Game
- Joe Fulks, NBA All-Star Game
- Andy Phillip, NBA All-Star Game
- Paul Arizin, NBA Scoring Champion
- Paul Arizin, All-NBA First Team
- Andy Phillip, All-NBA Second Team

== See also ==
- 1951–52 NBA season
