= 1951–52 Boston Celtics season =

Sixth season of the Boston Celtics in the National Basketball Association

- Head coach: Red Auerbach
- Arena: Boston Arena; Boston Garden

Results
- Record: 39–27 (.591)
- Place: Division: 2nd (Eastern)
- Playoff finish: East Division semifinals (lost to Knicks 1–2)
- Stats at Basketball Reference
- Radio: WHDH

The 1951–52 Boston Celtics season was the sixth season of the Boston Celtics in the National Basketball Association (NBA).

== Draft picks ==
Round	Pick	Player	Position	Nationality	College
1	7	Ernie Barrett	G/F	United States	Kansas State
2	16	Bill Garrett	F	United States	Indiana
6	56	James Luisi	G	United States	St. Francis (NY)

== Roster ==
Boston Celtics roster
Players

Pos.	No.	Player	Height	Weight	DOB	From
F/C	18	Bob Brannum	6 ft 5 in (1.96 m)	215 lb (98 kg)		Michigan State
F	11	Chuck Cooper	6 ft 5 in (1.96 m)	210 lb (95 kg)		Duquesne
G	14	Bob Cousy	6 ft 1 in (1.85 m)	175 lb (79 kg)		Holy Cross
F/C	23	Dick Dickey	6 ft 1 in (1.85 m)	175 lb (79 kg)		NC State
G/F	12	Bob Donham	6 ft 2 in (1.88 m)	190 lb (86 kg)		Ohio State
F/C	13	Bob Harris	6 ft 7 in (2.01 m)	195 lb (88 kg)		Oklahoma State
F/C	22	Ed Macauley	6 ft 8 in (2.03 m)	185 lb (84 kg)		Saint Louis
C	16	John Mahnken	6 ft 8 in (2.03 m)	220 lb (100 kg)		Georgetown
F/C	17	Bones McKinney	6 ft 6 in (1.98 m)	185 lb (84 kg)		North Carolina
G	21	Bill Sharman	6 ft 1 in (1.85 m)	175 lb (79 kg)		USC

Coaches
Head coach
- Red Auerbach

Legend
- (DP) Unsigned draft pick
- (FA) Free agent
- (S) Suspended
- Injured

Roster
Updated: 2011-03-14

== Pre-season ==
1951 Pre-season game log: 6–2 (home: 4–1; road: 2–1)
#	Date	Visitor	Score	Home	OT	Attendance	Record	Recap
1	October 18 (in Houlton, Maine)	Baltimore Bullets	71–90	Boston Celtics			1–0
2	October 16 (in Bangor, Maine)	Baltimore Bullets	85–99	Boston Celtics			2–0
3	October 17 (in Waterville, Maine)	Baltimore Bullets	87–100	Boston Celtics		1,200	3–0
4	October 19 (in Albany, New York)	Boston Celtics	82–98	New York Knicks			3–1
5	October 22 (in Barre, Vermont)	Baltimore Bullets	91–75	Boston Celtics			3–2
6	October 22 (in Berlin, New Hampshire)	Boston Celtics	90–55	College All-Stars		600	4–2
7	October 27 (in Washington D.C.)	Boston Celtics	90–89	Baltimore Bullets			5–2
8	October 28	New York Knicks	78–79	Boston Celtics			6–2

== Regular season ==
=== Season standings ===
Eastern Division	W	L	PCT	GB	Home	Road	Neutral	Div
x-Syracuse Nationals	40	26	.606	–	26–7	12–18	2–1	21–15
x-Boston Celtics	39	27	.591	1	22–7	10–19	7–1	22–14
x-New York Knicks	37	29	.561	3	21–4	12–22	4–3	23–13
x-Philadelphia Warriors	33	33	.500	7	24–7	6–25	3–1	14–22
Baltimore Bullets	20	46	.303	20	17–15	2–22	1–9	10–26

=== Game log ===
1951–52 game log
#	Date	Opponent	Score	High points	Record
1	November 4	Indianapolis	65–97	Bob Cousy (25)	1–0
2	November 10	N Philadelphia	69–83	Bob Cousy (24)	2–0
3	November 11	Minneapolis	72–77	Ed Macauley (21)	3–0
4	November 14	Fort Wayne	91–98 (OT)	Bob Cousy (28)	4–0
5	November 15	@ Syracuse	95–97	Ed Macauley (26)	4–1
6	November 17	@ Baltimore	88–75	Bob Cousy (26)	5–1
7	November 18	New York	78–75	Ed Macauley (35)	5–2
8	November 22	Milwaukee	72–103	Bob Cousy (19)	6–2
9	November 23	@ Philadelphia	102–100 (OT)	Ed Macauley (26)	7–2
10	November 24	@ New York	70–68	Bob Cousy (14)	8–2
11	November 25	Philadelphia	85–103	Bob Cousy (20)	9–2
12	November 28	@ Minneapolis	76–90	Cousy, Macauley (14)	9–3
13	November 30	@ Indianapolis	87–92	Ed Macauley (22)	9–4
14	December 2	Baltimore	82–103	Bob Cousy (21)	10–4
15	December 5	Fort Wayne	91–88	Bob Cousy (32)	10–5
16	December 9	New York	94–103	Bob Cousy (31)	11–5
17	December 11	@ Philadelphia	78–79	Bones McKinney (16)	11–6
18	December 12	Milwaukee	84–89	Bill Sharman (21)	12–6
19	December 16	Philadelphia	90–92 (OT)	Ed Macauley (32)	13–6
20	December 17	@ Baltimore	80–92	Ed Macauley (20)	13–7
21	December 19	Syracuse	97–103	Bob Cousy (29)	14–7
22	December 21	N Baltimore	106–89	Bob Cousy (25)	15–7
23	December 23	Indianapolis	88–91	Bob Cousy (18)	16–7
24	December 25	@ Minneapolis	93–100	Bob Cousy (22)	16–8
25	December 26	@ Fort Wayne	86–94	Ed Macauley (25)	16–9
26	December 30	New York	90–100	Ed Macauley (32)	17–9
27	December 31	@ New York	86–87 (OT)	Ed Macauley (27)	17–10
28	January 1	@ Rochester	91–106	Bob Cousy (22)	17–11
29	January 3	@ Syracuse	81–107	Bob Cousy (27)	17–12
30	January 5	@ Baltimore	94–73	Bob Cousy (27)	18–12
31	January 6	Rochester	80–91	Ed Macauley (22)	19–12
32	January 8	@ Milwaukee	83–76	Ed Macauley (24)	20–12
33	January 10	@ Fort Wayne	94–85	Bob Cousy (27)	21–12
34	January 11	@ Indianapolis	79–100	Ed Macauley (19)	21–13
35	January 16	Minneapolis	108–94	Cousy, Macauley (25)	21–14
36	January 20	Indianapolis	98–117	Bob Cousy (30)	22–14
37	January 23	Baltimore	75–117	Bob Cousy (26)	23–14
38	January 26	Philadelphia	89–85	Ed Macauley (29)	23–15
39	January 27	@ Syracuse	86–91	Bob Cousy (25)	23–16
40	January 29	@ Philadelphia	96–97	Bob Cousy (27)	23–17
41	February 1	N Milwaukee	77–100	Bob Cousy (29)	24–17
42	February 2	@ New York	83–91	Ed Macauley (26)	24–18
43	February 3	New York	95–100	Bob Cousy (30)	25–18
44	February 6	Syracuse	88–99	Bob Cousy (33)	26–18
45	February 9	@ Rochester	100–104	Bob Cousy (26)	26–19
46	February 10	@ Rochester	111–97	Bill Sharman (24)	26–20
47	February 14	@ Fort Wayne	90–94	Bob Cousy (31)	26–21
48	February 16	N Minneapolis	75–77	Bob Cousy (24)	27–21
49	February 17	N Milwaukee	97–95	Bob Cousy (22)	27–22
50	February 18	N Milwaukee	84–106	Bob Cousy (31)	28–22
51	February 19	@ Indianapolis	81–82	Ed Macauley (27)	28–23
52	February 21	Fort Wayne	67–88	Bob Cousy (24)	29–23
53	February 24	@ Syracuse	77–75	Bob Cousy (18)	30–23
54	February 27	Syracuse	81–88	Bob Cousy (22)	31–23
55	February 28	N Rochester	72–91	Ed Macauley (20)	32–23
56	March 1	@ New York	86–105	Cousy, Macauley (19)	32–24
57	March 2	New York	89–87	Bob Cousy (23)	32–25
58	March 4	N Baltimore	91–80	Bob Cousy (31)	33–25
59	March 5	Minneapolis	74–82	Ed Macauley (26)	34–25
60	March 8	@ Baltimore	100–77	Ed Macauley (21)	35–25
61	March 9	Baltimore	72–89	Bob Brannum (21)	36–25
62	March 11	@ Philadelphia	88–84	Bob Cousy (26)	37–25
63	March 12	Syracuse	89–71	Bill Sharman (15)	37–26
64	March 13	@ Syracuse	70–89	McKinney, Sharman (11)	37–27
65	March 15	@ Rochester	118–106	Bob Cousy (32)	38–27
66	March 16	Philadelphia	89–96	Ed Macauley (18)	39–27

== Playoffs ==
1952 playoff game log
Division semifinals: 1–2 (home: 1–1; road: 0–1)

Game	Date	Team	Score	High points	High assists	Location	Series
1	March 19	New York	W 105–94	Bob Cousy (31)	Bill Sharman (7)	Boston Garden	1–0
2	March 23	@ New York	L 97–101	Ed Macauley (36)	Bob Donham (9)	Madison Square Garden III	1–1
3	March 26	New York	L 87–88 (2OT)	Bob Cousy (34)	Bob Cousy (8)	Boston Garden	1–2

1952 schedule

== Awards and records ==
- Ed Macauley, All-NBA First Team
- Bob Cousy, All-NBA First Team

== See also ==
- 1951–52 NBA season
