= Jim Slaughter =

American basketball player

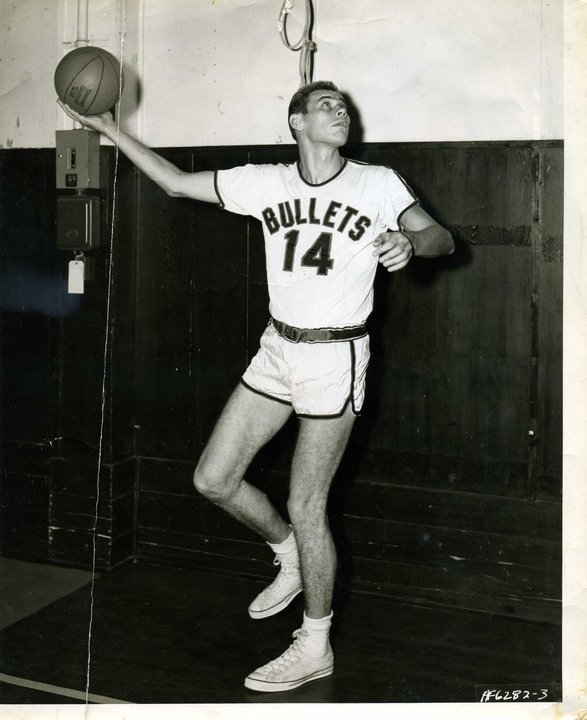

Personal information
- Born: May 13, 1928 Bristol, Tennessee, U.S.
- Died: August 2, 1999 (aged 71) Central, South Carolina, U.S.
- Listed height: 6 ft 11 in (2.11 m)
- Listed weight: 210 lb (95 kg)

Career information
- High school: Jefferson (Roanoke, Virginia); Augusta Military Academy (Fort Defiance, Virginia)
- College: South Carolina (1947–1951)
- NBA draft: 1951: 4th round, 31st overall pick
- Drafted by: Tri-Cities Blackhawks
- Position: Center
- Number: 11

Career history
- 1951–1952: Baltimore Bullets
- 1952: Washington Capitols

Career highlights
- AP honorable mention All-American (1951)
- Stats at NBA.com
- Stats at Basketball Reference

James Walker Slaughter (May 13, 1928 – August 2, 1999) was an American professional basketball player. Slaughter was selected in the 1951 NBA draft by the Tri-Cities Blackhawks after a collegiate career at South Carolina. He played for the Baltimore Bullets in 1951–52 and averaged 5.3 points, 5.3 rebounds and 0.9 assists per contest in 28 career games.

== Career statistics ==
Legend
GP	Games played	GS	Games started	MPG	Minutes per game
FG%	Field goal percentage	3P%	3-point field goal percentage	FT%	Free throw percentage
RPG	Rebounds per game	APG	Assists per game	SPG	Steals per game
BPG	Blocks per game	PPG	Points per game	**Bold**	Career high

=== NBA ===
==== Regular season ====
Year	Team	GP	MPG	FG%	FT%	RPG	APG	PPG
1951–52	Baltimore	28	18.8	.321	.603	5.3	.9	5.3
