= Wally Osterkorn =

American basketball player

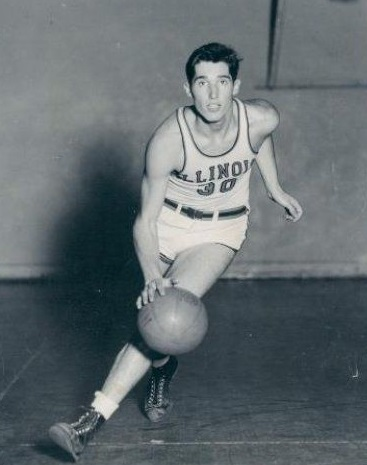
- Osterkorn in 1948

Personal information
- Born: July 6, 1928 Chicago, Illinois, U.S.
- Died: January 11, 2012 (aged 83) Phoenix, Arizona, U.S.
- Listed height: 6 ft 5 in (1.96 m)
- Listed weight: 215 lb (98 kg)

Career information
- High school: Amundsen (Chicago, Illinois)
- College: Illinois (1946–1950)
- NBA draft: 1950: 2nd round, 17th overall pick
- Drafted by: Chicago Stags
- Playing career: 1950–1955
- Position: Power forward / center
- Number: 17, 8

Career history
- 1950–1951: Saint Paul Lights
- 1951: Sheboygan Red Skins
- 1951–1955: Syracuse Nationals

Career highlights
- NBA champion (1955)

Career NBA statistics
- Points: 1,436 (7.0 ppg)
- Rebounds: 1,218 (6.0 rpg)
- Assists: 346 (1.7 apg)
- Stats at NBA.com
- Stats at Basketball Reference

Walter Raymond Osterkorn (July 6, 1928 – January 11, 2012) was an American professional basketball player.

A 6'5" forward from the University of Illinois, Osterkorn began his pro career with the St. Paul Lights of the National Professional Basketball League during the 1950–51 season. When St. Paul folded 20 games into the season, he was obtained by the Sheboygan Red Skins, who at that time were in their 13th season of operation, the longest-running professional basketball franchise in the nation. Osterkorn played the final 19 games for Sheboygan and helped the Red Skins to a league-best 29–16 record. He was named to the NPBL's second team as a forward after averaging 13 points per game, sixth-best in the league.

Osterkorn then played four seasons (1951–1955) in the National Basketball Association as a member of the Syracuse Nationals. He averaged 7.0 points per game and won a league championship in 1955. He died in 2012.

== Career statistics ==
Legend
GP	Games played	GS	Games started	MPG	Minutes per game
FG%	Field goal percentage	3P%	3-point field goal percentage	FT%	Free throw percentage
RPG	Rebounds per game	APG	Assists per game	SPG	Steals per game
BPG	Blocks per game	PPG	Points per game	**Bold**	Career high
†	Won an NBA championship	*	Led the league

=== NBA ===
==== Regular season ====
Year	Team	GP	MPG	FG%	FT%	RPG	APG	PPG
1951–52	Syracuse	66*	26.1	**.351**	.594	6.7	1.8	7.4
1952–53	Syracuse	49	20.7	.324	**.631**	4.4	1.2	5.6
1953–54	Syracuse	**70**	**30.9**	.346	.579	**7.0**	**2.2**	**8.8**
1954–55†	Syracuse	19	15.1	.206	.500	3.7	.9	2.9
Career		204	25.4	.334	.592	6.0	1.7	7.0

==== Playoffs ====
Year	Team	GP	MPG	FG%	FT%	RPG	APG	PPG
1952	Syracuse	7	35.6	.343	.596	8.1	**2.9**	10.6
1953	Syracuse	2	21.0	**.444**	.333	2.0	1.0	4.5
1954	Syracuse	**13***	**41.7**	.369	.556	**9.6**	2.8	**10.8**
1955†	Syracuse	11*	6.8	.324	**.765**	1.9	1.0	3.2
Career		33	27.5	.358	.586	6.3	2.1	7.6
