= 1951–52 Syracuse Nationals season =

Season for the Nationals in the National Basketball Association

- Division champions
- Head coach: Al Cervi
- Arena: Onondaga War Memorial

Results
- Record: 40–26 (.606)
- Place: Division: 1st (Eastern)
- Playoff finish: East Division Finals (eliminated 1–3)
- Stats at Basketball Reference

The 1951–52 Syracuse Nationals season was the Nationals' 3rd season in the NBA.

== Draft picks ==
Round	Pick	Player	Position	Nationality	College
7	64	Roy Reardon	Forward	USA	St. Francis (NY)

== Roster ==
1951–52 Syracuse Nationals roster
Players

Pos.	No.	Player	Height	Weight	DOB	From
G		Gerry Calabrese	6 ft 1 in (1.85 m)	175 lb (79 kg)	1925-02-04	St. John's
G/F		Al Cervi	5 ft 11 in (1.80 m)	170 lb (77 kg)	1917-02-12	East HS (NY)
G/F		Bill Gabor	5 ft 11 in (1.80 m)	170 lb (77 kg)	1922-05-13	Syracuse
C		Noble Jorgensen	6 ft 9 in (2.06 m)	228 lb (103 kg)	1925-05-18	Iowa
G		George King	6 ft 0 in (1.83 m)	175 lb (79 kg)	1928-08-16	College of Charleston
F/C		Wally Osterkorn	6 ft 4 in (1.93 m)	205 lb (93 kg)	1928-07-06	Illinois
F/C		George Ratkovicz	6 ft 6 in (1.98 m)	220 lb (100 kg)	1922-11-13	Lindblom (IL)
F/C		Red Rocha	6 ft 8 in (2.03 m)	185 lb (84 kg)	1923-09-18	Oregon State
G/F		Don Savage	6 ft 3 in (1.91 m)	190 lb (86 kg)	1928-04-09	Le Moyne
F/C		Dolph Schayes	6 ft 7 in (2.01 m)	195 lb (88 kg)	1928-05-19	NYU
G/F		Paul Seymour	6 ft 1 in (1.85 m)	180 lb (82 kg)	1928-01-30	Toledo

Coaches
Head coach

Al Cervi

Legend
- (DP) Unsigned draft pick
- (FA) Free agent
- (S) Suspended
- Injured

Roster

== Regular season ==
=== Season standings ===
Eastern Division	W	L	PCT	GB	Home	Road	Neutral	Div
x-Syracuse Nationals	40	26	.606	–	26–7	12–18	2–1	21–15
x-Boston Celtics	39	27	.591	1	22–7	10–19	7–1	22–14
x-New York Knicks	37	29	.561	3	21–4	12–22	4–3	23–13
x-Philadelphia Warriors	33	33	.500	7	24–7	6–25	3–1	14–22
Baltimore Bullets	20	46	.303	20	17–15	2–22	1–9	10–26

x – clinched playoff spot

=== Game log ===
1951–52 Game log
#	Date	Opponent	Score	High points	Record
1	November 1	Fort Wayne	W 90–75	Dolph Schayes (18)	1–0
2	November 4	Minneapolis	W 98–67	Dolph Schayes (23)	2–0
3	November 10	@ Baltimore	L 82–91	Billy Gabor (18)	2–1
4	November 11	Indianapolis	W 93–79	Red Rocha (21)	3–1
5	November 15	Boston	W 97–95	Osterkorn, Schayes (15)	4–1
6	November 16	@ Philadelphia	W 97–90	Dolph Schayes (35)	5–1
7	November 17	@ New York	W 79–72	Dolph Schayes (20)	6–1
8	November 18	Baltimore	W 71–68	Al Cervi (26)	7–1
9	November 22	@ Fort Wayne	W 96–72	Red Rocha (23)	8–1
10	November 23	@ Indianapolis	L 68–82	Dolph Schayes (14)	8–2
11	November 25	New York	W 100–73	Al Cervi (19)	9–2
12	November 29	Fort Wayne	W 82–78	Red Rocha (21)	10–2
13	November 30	@ Philadelphia	L 75–82	King, Seymour (15)	10–3
14	December 2	Rochester	L 79–81	Dolph Schayes (29)	10–4
15	December 4	@ Indianapolis	L 77–83	Al Cervi (16)	10–5
16	December 5	@ Minneapolis	W 83–81 (OT)	Dolph Schayes (24)	11–5
17	December 6	vs.Milwaukee	L 70–73	Paul Seymour (15)	11–6
18	December 8	@ Rochester	W 95–75	Dolph Schayes (24)	12–6
19	December 9	Philadelphia	W 93–74	Wally Osterkorn (17)	13–6
20	December 11	vs.Fort Wayne	W 80–62	Red Rocha (17)	14–6
21	December 13	Milwaukee	W 89–82	Billy Gabor (23)	15–6
22	December 16	Indianapolis	L 92–96	Dolph Schayes (21)	15–7
23	December 19	@ Boston	L 97–103	Wally Osterkorn (19)	15–8
24	December 22	@ New York	L 73–92	Dolph Schayes (15)	15–9
25	December 23	New York	L 72–75	Noble Jorgensen (18)	15–10
26	December 25	vs.Milwaukee	W 70–65	Red Rocha (16)	16–10
27	December 27	Milwaukee	69–68	Ratkovicz, Rocha (13)	16–11
28	December 30	Baltimore	91–108	Red Rocha (20)	17–11
29	January 1	@ Minneapolis	80–82	Red Rocha (18)	17–12
30	January 3	Boston	81–107	George King (17)	18–12
31	January 6	Philadelphia	93–98	Dolph Schayes (26)	19–12
32	January 10	New York	96–110	Billy Gabor (27)	20–12
33	January 12	@ Baltimore	92–88	Dolph Schayes (22)	21–12
34	January 13	Indianapolis	85–103	Billy Gabor (23)	22–12
35	January 17	Minneapolis	105–110 (3OT)	Dolph Schayes (41)	23–12
36	January 20	Baltimore	80–99	Billy Gabor (21)	24–12
37	January 22	@ Milwaukee	93–82	Ratkovicz, Rocha, Seymour (17)	25–12
38	January 23	@ Minneapolis	99–97 (OT)	George King (22)	26–12
39	January 25	@ Philadelphia	94–95 (OT)	Dolph Schayes (27)	26–13
40	January 26	@ Baltimore	78–73	Red Rocha (21)	27–13
41	January 27	Boston	86–91	Dolph Schayes (29)	28–13
42	January 31	Milwaukee	79–88	Jorgensen, Rocha (16)	29–13
43	February 3	Baltimore	73–95	Dolph Schayes (27)	30–13
44	February 6	@ Boston	88–99	Dolph Schayes (20)	30–14
45	February 8	@ Philadelphia	96–87	George King (19)	31–14
46	February 9	@ Baltimore	76–84	Red Rocha (21)	31–15
47	February 10	Philadelphia	84–91	Paul Seymour (21)	32–15
48	February 12	@ New York	69–78	Gerald Calabrese (14)	32–16
49	February 14	Rochester	78–76	Red Rocha (21)	32–17
50	February 16	@ Rochester	84–92	Red Rocha (18)	32–18
51	February 17	New York	61–66	George King (17)	33–18
52	February 21	Minneapolis	80–88	George King (21)	34–18
53	February 23	@ Baltimore	80–81	Red Rocha (21)	34–19
54	February 24	Boston	77–75	George King (17)	34–20
55	February 27	@ Boston	81–88	Wally Osterkorn (19)	34–21
56	February 28	Fort Wayne	83–88	George King (18)	35–21
57	March 1	@ Rochester	83–98	Noble Jorgensen (21)	35–22
58	March 2	Rochester	72–76	George Ratkovicz (15)	36–22
59	March 6	@ Fort Wayne	83–81 (2OT)	Red Rocha (20)	37–22
60	March 7	@ Indianapolis	76–81	George King (15)	37–23
61	March 8	@ Philadelphia	83–92	Al Cervi (21)	37–24
62	March 9	Philadelphia	82–99	Paul Seymour (15)	38–24
63	March 12	@ Boston	89–71	George King (25)	39–24
64	March 13	Boston	82–81	Wally Osterkorn (16)	40–24
65	March 15	@ New York	90–97	Noble Jorgensen (16)	40–25
66	March 16	New York	90–84	Rocha, Schayes (19)	40–26

== Playoffs ==
1952 playoff game log
Division Semifinals: 2–1 (home: 2–0; road: 0–1)

Game	Date	Team	Score	High points	High rebounds	High assists	Location	Series
1	March 20	Philadelphia	W 102–83	Dolph Schayes (31)	Dolph Schayes (18)	Seymour, Osterkorn (4)	Onondaga War Memorial	1–0
2	March 22	@ Philadelphia	L 95–100	Osterkorn, Seymour (16)	Schayes, Ratkovicz (12)	Wally Osterkorn (7)	Philadelphia Arena	1–1
3	March 23	Philadelphia	W 84–73	Red Rocha (20)	Wally Osterkorn (12)	Paul Seymour (4)	Onondaga War Memorial	2–1

Division Finals: 1–3 (home: 1–1; road: 0–2)

Game	Date	Team	Score	High points	Location	Series
1	April 2	New York	L 85–87	Dolph Schayes (25)	Onondaga War Memorial	0–1
2	April 3	New York	W 102–92	Paul Seymour (21)	Onondaga War Memorial	1–1
3	April 5	@ New York	L 92–99	Red Rocha (22)	Madison Square Garden III	1–2
4	April 6	@ New York	L 93–100	Dolph Schayes (22)	Madison Square Garden III	1–3

1952 schedule

== Awards and records ==
Dolph Schayes, All-NBA First Team

== See also ==
- 1951–52 NBA season
