= Pete Darcey =

American basketball player (1930–2009)

Personal information
- Born: March 3, 1930 Oklahoma City, Oklahoma, U.S.
- Died: August 31, 2009 (aged 79) Oklahoma City, Oklahoma, U.S.
- Listed height: 6 ft 8 in (2.03 m)
- Listed weight: 217 lb (98 kg)

Career information
- High school: Classen (Oklahoma City, Oklahoma)
- College: Oklahoma State (1949–1952)
- NBA draft: 1952: undrafted
- Playing career: 1952–1953
- Position: Center
- Number: 10

Career history
- 1952–1953: Milwaukee Hawks

Career statistics
- Points: 11
- Rebounds: 10
- Assists: 2
- Stats at NBA.com
- Stats at Basketball Reference

Henry Joseph "Pete" Darcey III (March 3, 1930 – August 31, 2009) was a center in the National Basketball Association. Darcey played with the Milwaukee Hawks before being traded along with Don Boven and George McLeod to the Baltimore Bullets for Stan Miasek and Dave Minor.

Darcey died in 2009.

== Career statistics ==
Legend
| GP | Games played | GS | Games started | MPG | Minutes per game |
| FG% | Field goal percentage | 3P% | 3-point field goal percentage | FT% | Free throw percentage |
| RPG | Rebounds per game | APG | Assists per game | SPG | Steals per game |
| BPG | Blocks per game | PPG | Points per game | **Bold** | Career high |

=== NBA ===
==== Regular season ====
| Year | Team | GP | MPG | FG% | FT% | RPG | APG | PPG |
|---|---|---|---|---|---|---|---|---|
| 1952–53 | Milwaukee | 12 | 7.5 | .167 | .556 | .8 | .2 | .9 |
