= Bob Donham =

American basketball player (1926–1983)

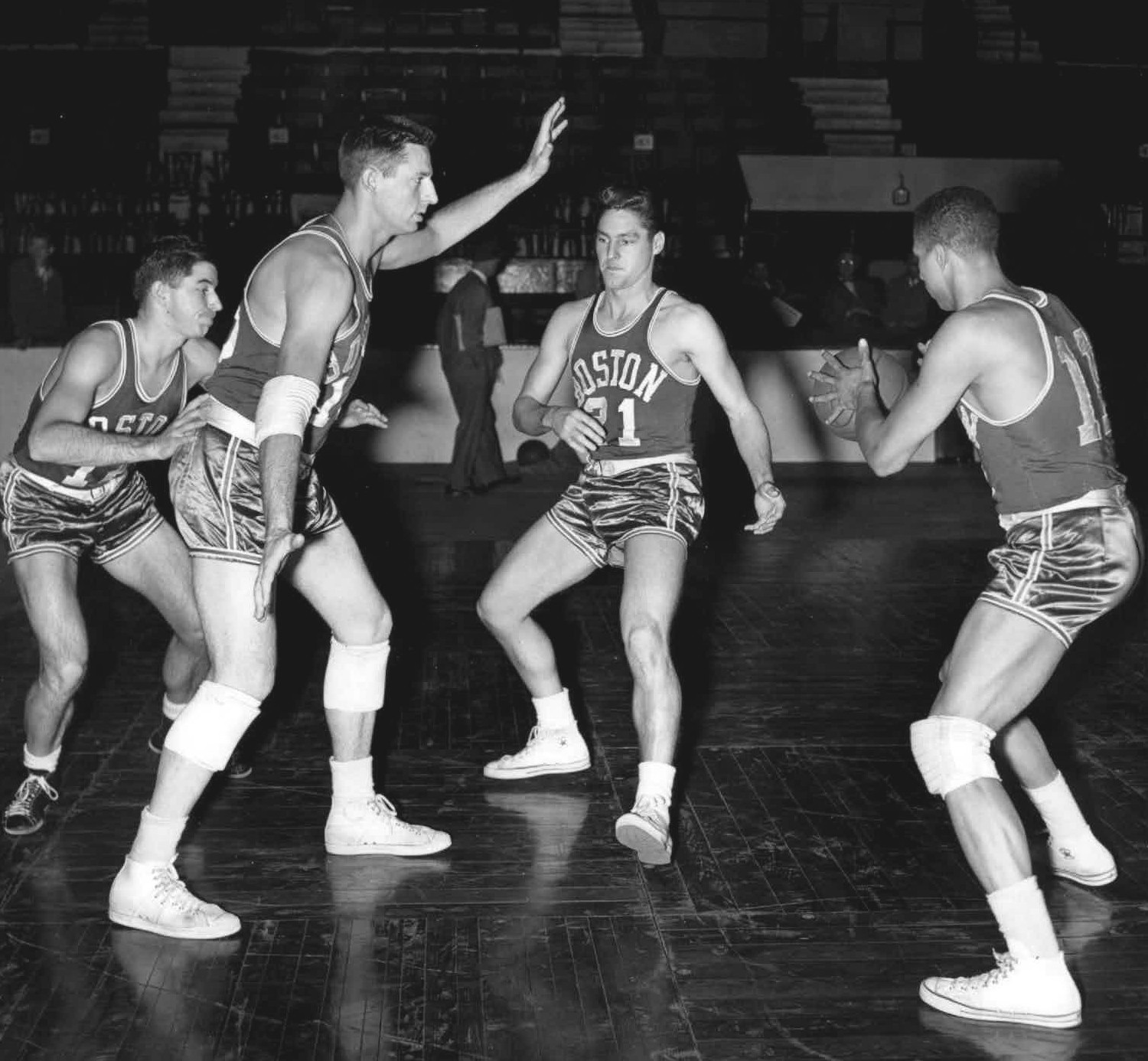
- Donham (far left) during a Boston Celtics practice

Personal information
- Born: October 11, 1926 Hammond, Indiana, U.S.
- Died: September 21, 1983 (aged 56) Seattle, Washington, U.S.
- Listed height: 6 ft 2 in (1.88 m)
- Listed weight: 190 lb (86 kg)

Career information
- High school: Clark (Hammond, Indiana)
- College: Ohio State (1946–1950)
- NBA draft: 1950: 3rd round, 24th overall pick
- Drafted by: Boston Celtics
- Playing career: 1950–1954
- Position: Shooting guard
- Number: 12

Career history

Playing
- 1950–1954: Boston Celtics

Coaching
- 1954–1957: Washington (assistant)
- 1957–1962: Bowdoin

Career highlights
- First-team All-Big Ten (1950)

Career NBA statistics
- Points: 1,818 (6.7 ppg)
- Rebounds: 1,071 (3.9 rpg)
- Assists: 706 (2.6 apg)
- Stats at NBA.com
- Stats at Basketball Reference

Robert E. Donham (October 11, 1926 – September 21, 1983) was an American professional basketball player. Donham was selected in the third round of the 1950 NBA draft by the Boston Celtics after a collegiate career at Ohio State. In four NBA seasons, all with the Celtics, Donham recorded 1,818 points, 1,071 rebounds and 706 assists. After his playing career ended, Donham became the junior varsity basketball coach at the University of Washington, where he was working on his doctorate in physical education. In 1957, he became the head coach at Bowdoin College. He resigned in 1962 to enter the securities business.

== NBA career statistics ==
Legend
GP	Games played	MPG	Minutes per game
FG%	Field-goal percentage	FT%	Free-throw percentage
RPG	Rebounds per game	APG	Assists per game
PPG	Points per game	**Bold**	Career high

=== Regular season ===
Year	Team	GP	MPG	FG%	FT%	RPG	APG	PPG
1950–51	Boston	68	–	**.507**	.498	3.5	2.0	6.1
1951–52	Boston	66	**30.0**	.487	.509	**5.0**	**3.5**	**8.3**
1952–53	Boston	**71**	20.2	.479	.471	3.4	2.2	6.4
1953–54	Boston	68	21.3	.448	**.554**	3.9	2.7	5.9
Career		273	23.7	.480	.507	3.9	2.6	6.7

=== Playoffs ===
Year	Team	GP	MPG	FG%	FT%	RPG	APG	PPG
1951	Boston	2	–	.444	.417	4.0	1.0	6.5
1952	Boston	3	**37.3**	**.474**	**.500**	**4.3**	**5.7**	**9.0**
1953	Boston	**6**	23.0	.289	.407	3.5	2.2	5.5
1954	Boston	**6**	16.3	.467	.316	2.0	1.0	3.3
Career		17	23.2	.383	.408	3.2	2.2	5.5
