= Dave Minor =

American basketball player (1922–1998)

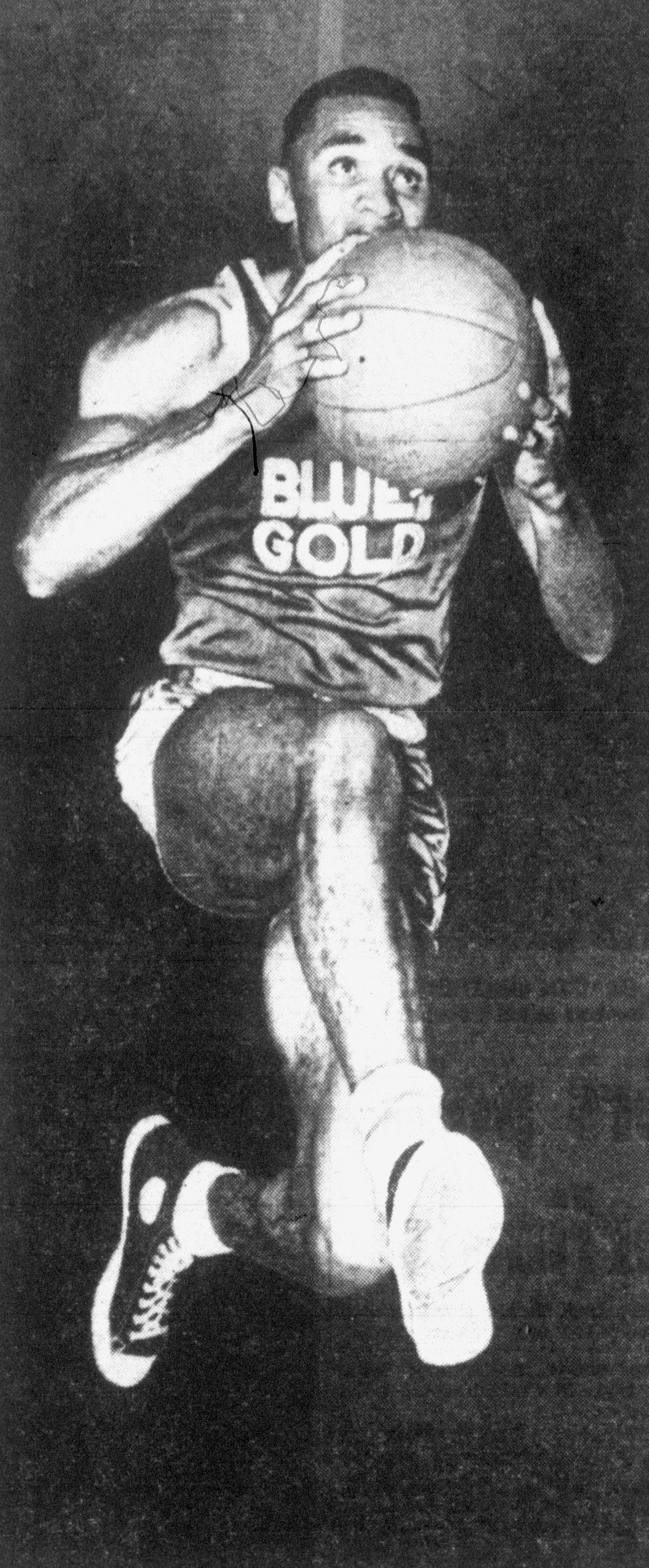
- Minor circa 1950

Personal information
- Born: February 23, 1922 Ruleville, Mississippi, U.S.
- Died: March 14, 1998 (aged 76)
- Listed height: 6 ft 2 in (1.88 m)
- Listed weight: 185 lb (84 kg)

Career information
- High school: Froebel (Gary, Indiana)
- College: Toledo (1942–1943); UCLA (1946–1948)
- Playing career: 1951–1953
- Position: Point guard / shooting guard
- Number: 10, 8

Career history
- 1951–1953: Baltimore Bullets
- 1953: Milwaukee Hawks

Career highlights
- Second-team All-American – SN (1943); 2× First-team All-PCC (1947, 1948)

Career statistics
- Points: 877 (7.6 ppg)
- Rebounds: 527 (4.5 rpg)
- Assists: 288 (2.5 apg)
- Stats at NBA.com
- Stats at Basketball Reference

Davage T. Minor (February 23, 1922 – March 14, 1998) was an American basketball player in the National Basketball Association (NBA). He played with the Baltimore Bullets before being traded along with Stan Miasek to the Milwaukee Hawks for Don Boven, Pete Darcey and George McLeod. He began his college career with the Toledo Rockets, it was interrupted by World War II; following the war, he enrolled at UCLA. In 1947–1948, Minor was honored as an All-Conference guard basketball player at UCLA. Sportswriters in Gary, Indiana called him "The Wheelhorse of Steel City." He began shooting the first jumpers seen around the Great Lakes in December 1937 in his high school gym in Gary. By 1941, the shot was so unstoppable he used it to take the Froebel High School Blue Devils all the way to the Final Four of the Indiana state tournament, the "mother of them all." Eventually, he starred with the old Oakland Bittners of the AAU, and he was one of the first five African Americans signed in the NBA. Minor died in 1998.

In December 2019, he was announced as a member of the 2020 Class in the Indiana Basketball Hall of Fame.

== Career statistics ==
Legend
GP	Games played	GS	Games started	MPG	Minutes per game
FG%	Field goal percentage	3P%	3-point field goal percentage	FT%	Free throw percentage
RPG	Rebounds per game	APG	Assists per game	SPG	Steals per game
BPG	Blocks per game	PPG	Points per game	**Bold**	Career high

=== NBA ===
==== Regular season ====
Year	Team	GP	MPG	FG%	FT%	RPG	APG	PPG
1951–52	Baltimore	**57**	27.3	.354	.765	4.8	**2.8**	**8.3**
1952–53	Baltimore	19	15.8	.358	**.769**	2.2	1.2	4.6
1952–53	Milwaukee	40	**32.7**	**.369**	.736	**5.3**	2.6	8.0
Career		116	27.3	.360	.754	4.5	2.5	7.6
