= 1951–52 Baltimore Bullets season =

- Head coach: Fred Scolari; Chick Reiser
- Arena: Baltimore Coliseum

Results
- Record: 20–46 (.303)
- Place: Division: 5th (Eastern)
- Playoff finish: Did not qualify
- Stats at Basketball Reference

Local media
- Television: WAAM
- Radio: WITH

The 1951–52 Baltimore Bullets season was the Bullets' 5th season in the NBA and eighth overall season of existence.

== Draft picks ==
Round	Pick	Player	Position(s)	Nationality	College
1	1	Gene Melchiorre	PG	United States	Bradley
2	10	Jack Stone	SG/SF	United States	Kansas State
3	20	Billy Mann	F	United States	Bradley
4	30	Billy Hagler	F	United States	California
5	40	Leroy Ishman	F	United States	American
6	50	Glenn Duggins	G	United States	Utah
7	60	Tom Riach	G	United States	USC
8	70	Bill Harper	PG	United States	Oregon State
9	78	Bobby Crowe	PG	United States	San Jose State
10	82	Dan Torrey	G	United States	Oregon State
11	85	Clem Pavilonis	PF/C	United States	DePaul
12	86	John Burke	G	United States	International YMCA College

The Bullets were the only team to use all twelve rounds of this year's draft. Despite that, none of the players they drafted would end up playing for them, though the Bullets would at least acquire Jim Slaughter and James Luisi by trades with the Tri-Cities Blackhawks turned Milwaukee Hawks and New York Knicks respectively. Rather infamously, the #1 pick they had in this year's draft, Gene Melchiorre, would later be revealed to be involved in the CCNY point-shaving scandal of 1951 alongside fellow Bullets draft pick Billy Mann, leaving Melchiorre with the notable distinction of being the only #1 draft pick to ever be permanently banned by the NBA, though he wouldn't be the only #1 draft pick to never play in the NBA at all.

== Roster ==
1951–52 Baltimore Bullets roster
Players

Pos.	No.	Player	Height	Weight	DOB	From
Pos.	#	Name	Ht.	Wt.	From
PF	6	Don Barksdale	6 ft 6 in (1.98 m)	200 lb (91 kg)		UCLA
SG	5	Bill Calhoun	6 ft 3 in (1.91 m)	180 lb (82 kg)		San Francisco
PF	11	Alex Hannum	6 ft 7 in (2.01 m)	210 lb (95 kg)		USC
SF	8	Frank Kudelka	6 ft 2 in (1.88 m)	193 lb (88 kg)		Saint Mary's
SF	13	Joe McNamee	6 ft 6 in (1.98 m)	210 lb (95 kg)		San Francisco
PF	12	Stan Miasek	6 ft 5 in (1.96 m)	210 lb (95 kg)		Textile HS (NY)
SG	10	Dave Minor	6 ft 2 in (1.88 m)	185 lb (84 kg)		UCLA
PG	7	Kevin O'Shea	6 ft 2 in (1.88 m)	175 lb (79 kg)		Notre Dame
SG	16	Red Owens	6 ft 3 in (1.91 m)	185 lb (84 kg)		Baylor
SF	11	Don Rehfeldt	6 ft 7 in (2.01 m)	210 lb (95 kg)		Wisconsin
SG	9	Pep Saul	6 ft 2 in (1.88 m)	185 lb (84 kg)		Seton Hall
PG	20	Fred Scolari	5 ft 10 in (1.78 m)	180 lb (82 kg)		San Francisco
C	11	Jim Slaughter	6 ft 11 in (2.11 m)	210 lb (95 kg)		South Carolina
SG	5	Belus Smawley	6 ft 1 in (1.85 m)	195 lb (88 kg)		Appalachian State
PF	7	Brady Walker	6 ft 6 in (1.98 m)	180 lb (82 kg)		BYU

Coaches
Head coach
- Fred Scolari
  Chick Reiser

Legend
- (DP) Unsigned draft pick
- (FA) Free agent
- (S) Suspended
- Injured

== Regular season ==
=== Season standings ===
Eastern Division	W	L	PCT	GB	Home	Road	Neutral	Div
x-Syracuse Nationals	40	26	.606	–	26–7	12–18	2–1	21–15
x-Boston Celtics	39	27	.591	1	22–7	10–19	7–1	22–14
x-New York Knicks	37	29	.561	3	21–4	12–22	4–3	23–13
x-Philadelphia Warriors	33	33	.500	7	24–7	6–25	3–1	14–22
Baltimore Bullets	20	46	.303	20	17–15	2–22	1–9	10–26

=== Game log ===
1951–52 Game log
#	Date	Opponent	Score	High points	Record
1	November 1	@ Rochester	97–101	Fred Scolari (26)	0–1
2	November 3	Indianapolis	90–86	Minor, Scolari (15)	0–2
3	November 5	Philadelphia	90–96	Frank Saul (18)	1–2
4	November 10	Syracuse	82–91	Hannum, Minor, Scolari (12)	2–2
5	November 12	Minneapolis	90–80	Fred Scolari (16)	2–3
6	November 17	Boston	88–75	Stan Miasek (18)	2–4
7	November 18	@ Syracuse	68–71	Stan Miasek (13)	2–5
8	November 19	Milwaukee	70–71	Frank Kudelka (16)	3–5
9	November 20	N New York	88–86	Barksdale, Scolari (23)	3–6
10	November 24	Philadelphia	74–81	Don Barksdale (20)	4–6
11	November 25	@ Fort Wayne	66–83	Don Barksdale (14)	4–7
12	November 29	N Milwaukee	64–77	Don Barksdale (15)	5–7
13	December 1	New York	82–84	Stan Miasek (20)	6–7
14	December 2	@ Boston	82–103	Stan Miasek (14)	6–8
15	December 3	Rochester	77–70	Don Barksdale (18)	6–9
16	December 7	@ Indianapolis	80–88	Red Owens (20)	6–10
17	December 8	N Minneapolis	85–64	Don Barksdale (13)	6–11
18	December 9	@ Milwaukee	73–71	Frank Kudelka (22)	7–11
19	December 12	@ Minneapolis	79–99	Frank Kudelka (14)	7–12
20	December 15	Fort Wayne	80–90	Stan Miasek (25)	8–12
21	December 16	@ Rochester	95–99	Hannum, Miasek (26)	8–13
22	December 17	Boston	80–92	Fred Scolari (22)	9–13
23	December 18	N Philadelphia	82–78	Stan Miasek (17)	9–14
24	December 21	N Boston	106–89	Alex Hannum (25)	9–15
25	December 22	Minneapolis	96–90 (3OT)	Stan Miasek (29)	9–16
26	December 26	Philadelphia	99–103 (3OT)	Miasek, Scolari (18)	10–16
27	December 29	Indianapolis	65–75	Stan Miasek (24)	11–16
28	December 30	@ Syracuse	91–108	Stan Miasek (22)	11–17
29	December 31	Fort Wayne	95–86	Fred Scolari (27)	11–18
30	January 4	@ Philadelphia	79–92	Fred Scolari (17)	11–19
31	January 5	Boston	94–73	Stan Miasek (20)	11–20
32	January 12	Syracuse	92–88	Don Barksdale (20)	11–21
33	January 13	@ Fort Wayne	71–81	Fred Scolari (26)	11–22
34	January 16	N Milwaukee	77–71	Don Barksdale (24)	11–23
35	January 17	N Milwaukee	87–76	Fred Scolari (15)	11–24
36	January 19	Indianapolis	78–81	Stan Miasek (27)	12–24
37	January 20	@ Syracuse	80–99	Miasek, Scolari (17)	12–25
38	January 21	New York	99–83	Stan Miasek (19)	12–26
39	January 23	@ Boston	75–117	Calhoun, Minor (13)	12–27
40	January 26	Syracuse	78–73	Don Barksdale (18)	12–28
41	February 1	@ Philadelphia	79–81	Fred Scolari (16)	12–29
42	February 2	Fort Wayne	76–63	Don Barksdale (21)	12–30
43	February 3	@ Syracuse	73–95	Dave Minor (15)	12–31
44	February 4	New York	81–82	Don Barksdale (22)	13–31
45	February 6	@ New York	70–73	Don Barksdale (20)	13–32
46	February 8	N New York	103–83	Don Barksdale (19)	13–33
47	February 9	Syracuse	76–84	Fred Scolari (21)	14–33
48	February 10	@ Fort Wayne	82–77	Frank Kudelka (23)	15–33
49	February 13	Rochester	91–96	Fred Scolari (29)	16–33
50	February 14	@ Indianapolis	66–89	Miasek, Minor (17)	16–34
51	February 16	@ New York	82–102	Fred Scolari (19)	16–35
52	February 17	Philadelphia	90–83	Don Barksdale (24)	16–36
53	February 20	Minneapolis	93–78	Kevin O'Shea (16)	16–37
54	February 23	Syracuse	80–81	Fred Scolari (18)	17–37
55	February 24	@ Rochester	100–124	Dave Minor (21)	17–38
56	February 25	New York	69–72	Fred Scolari (25)	17–39
57	February 29	@ Philadelphia	86–103	Don Barksdale (20)	17–40
58	March 1	Philadelphia	77–90	Frank Kudelka (19)	18–40
59	March 3	Rochester	96–99	Don Barksdale (25)	19–40
60	March 4	N Boston	91–80	Frank Kudelka (16)	19–41
61	March 5	N New York	88–82	Don Barksdale (21)	19–42
62	March 8	Boston	100–77	Don Barksdale (18)	19–43
63	March 9	@ Boston	72–89	Joe McNamee (16)	19–44
64	March 10	Milwaukee	80–91	Fred Scolari (25)	20–44
65	March 14	@ Indianapolis	87–103	Fred Scolari (18)	20–45
66	March 16	Minneapolis	82–126	Don Barksdale (18)	20–46

== Player statistics ==
Legend
GP	Games played	GS	Games started	MPG	Minutes per game
FG%	Field-goal percentage	3P%	3-point field-goal percentage	FT%	Free-throw percentage
RPG	Rebounds per game	APG	Assists per game	SPG	Steals per game
BPG	Blocks per game	PPG	Points per game
