= George Ratkovicz =

American basketball player (1922–2008)

Personal information
- Born: November 13, 1922 Chicago, Illinois, U.S.
- Died: November 10, 2008 (aged 85) Webster, New York, U.S.
- Listed height: 6 ft 6 in (1.98 m)
- Listed weight: 220 lb (100 kg)

Career information
- High school: Lindblom (Chicago, Illinois)
- Playing career: 1941–1955
- Position: Center / power forward
- Number: 65, 6, 10, 13

Career history
- 1941–1942: Chicago Bruins
- 1945–1947: Chicago American Gears
- 1947–1948: Rochester Royals
- 1948–1949: Tri-Cities Blackhawks
- 1949–1952: Syracuse Nationals
- 1952: Baltimore Bullets
- 1952–1955: Milwaukee Hawks

Career highlights
- NBL champion (1947)

Career NBA statistics
- Points: 3,141
- Rebounds: 1,937
- Assists: 791
- Stats at NBA.com
- Stats at Basketball Reference

George Ratkovicz (November 13, 1922 – November 10, 2008) was an American basketball player who played for five seasons in the National Basketball League and for six seasons in the National Basketball Association (NBA). He played center and power forward during his career.

== Career ==
=== National Basketball League ===
Ratkovicz's pro career began when he was 19 years old, playing 13 games for the Chicago Bruins of the National Basketball League during the 1941–1942 season. Ratkovicz missed the next three seasons due to military service, then returned to Chicago in time for the 1945–1946 season, this time playing for the Chicago American Gears. He spent two seasons with the Gears, then went on to play for the NBL's Rochester Royals and Tri-Cities Blackhawks for one season apiece.

=== Syracuse Nationals ===
When the NBL merged with the Basketball Association of America and formed the National Basketball Association, Ratkovicz joined the Syracuse Nationals for the 1949–1950 season. Playing alongside future Basketball Hall of Famers Dolph Schayes and Al Cervi, Ratkovicz averaged eight and a half points per game in his first NBA season and played in the NBA Finals, where the Nationals lost to the Minneapolis Lakers in six games.

Statistically, Ratkovicz's best season came the following year during the 1950–1951 season. Playing in all 66 of the Nationals' team games, he averaged thirteen points and over eight rebounds per game. His 41.5% field goal percentage was the sixth highest in the NBA that season, and he also ranked in the top ten in free throws and free throw attempts.

Ratkovicz's role was reduced during the 1951–1952 season; playing in twenty and a half minutes a game, he averaged seven and a half points and five rebounds per game while serving as a backup to Dolph Schayes.

=== Milwaukee Hawks ===
For the 1952–1953 season, Ratkovicz joined the Milwaukee Hawks. His playing time increased with the Hawks, and he averaged over thirty minutes a game in his first year with the Hawks. That season, he averaged nine-and-a-half points and nearly seven-and-a-half rebounds per game. He recorded similar numbers during the 1953–1954 season. During the 1954–1955 season, his final year in the NBA, he played in just nine games. He retired with over 3,000 points and nearly 2,000 rebounds in his career.

== Death ==
Ratkovicz died in Webster, New York on November 10, 2008, three days before his 86th birthday.

== Career statistics ==
Legend
| GP | Games played | GS | Games started | MPG | Minutes per game |
| FG% | Field goal percentage | 3P% | 3-point field goal percentage | FT% | Free throw percentage |
| RPG | Rebounds per game | APG | Assists per game | SPG | Steals per game |
| BPG | Blocks per game | PPG | Points per game | **Bold** | Career high |

=== NBA ===
==== Regular season ====
| Year | Team | GP | MPG | FG% | FT% | RPG | APG | PPG |
|---|---|---|---|---|---|---|---|---|
| 1949–50 | Syracuse | 62 | – | .369 | .606 | – | 2.0 | 8.6 |
| 1950–51 | Syracuse | 66 | – | **.415** | **.731** | **8.3** | 2.9 | **12.9** |
| 1951–52 | Syracuse | 66* | 20.5 | .349 | .674 | 5.0 | 1.4 | 7.5 |
| 1952–53 | Baltimore | 10 | 19.7 | .372 | .514 | 5.2 | 1.8 | 5.1 |
| 1952–53 | Milwaukee | 61 | **33.4** | .333 | .723 | 7.7 | **3.3** | 10.3 |
| 1953–54 | Milwaukee | **69** | 31.4 | .393 | .645 | 7.6 | 2.2 | 8.3 |
| 1954–55 | Milwaukee | 9 | 11.3 | .158 | .435 | 1.9 | 1.4 | 1.8 |
| Career | | 343 | 27.3 | .372 | .673 | 6.9 | 2.3 | 9.2 |

==== Playoffs ====
| Year | Team | GP | MPG | FG% | FT% | RPG | APG | PPG |
|---|---|---|---|---|---|---|---|---|
| 1950 | Syracuse | **11** | – | .388 | .685 | – | 1.9 | 13.1 |
| 1951 | Syracuse | 7 | – | **.475** | **.745** | **9.0** | **2.0** | **13.9** |
| 1952 | Syracuse | 6 | 9.8 | .333 | .400 | 3.7 | .5 | 3.0 |
| Career | | 24 | 9.8 | .410 | .669 | 6.5 | 1.6 | 10.8 |
