= Don Boven =

American basketball player (1925-2011)

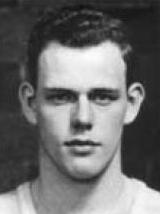

Personal information
- Born: March 6, 1925 Kalamazoo, Michigan, U.S.
- Died: March 10, 2011 (aged 86) Kalamazoo, Michigan, U.S.
- Listed height: 6 ft 4 in (1.93 m)
- Listed weight: 210 lb (95 kg)

Career information
- High school: Kalamazoo Central (Kalamazoo, Michigan)
- College: Western Michigan (1946–1949)
- BAA draft: 1949: 6th round, —
- Drafted by: Indianapolis Jets
- Playing career: 1949–1953
- Position: Small forward / shooting guard
- Number: 12, 18, 13
- Coaching career: 1953–1966

Career history

Playing
- 1949–1951: Waterloo Hawks
- 1951–1953: Milwaukee Hawks
- 1953: Baltimore Bullets
- 1953: Fort Wayne Pistons

Coaching
- 1953–1958: Western Michigan (assistant)
- 1958–1966: Western Michigan
- Stats at NBA.com
- Stats at Basketball Reference

Donald Edwin Boven (March 6, 1925 – March 10, 2011) was an American basketball player, coach, and university instructor. He was a World War II veteran who was a standout athlete at Western Michigan University. After playing professional basketball, he served as an instructor at the university for more than 30 years. In the 1980s, Boven retired from his teaching duties but remained active in sporting circles and became involved in public service in his Michigan township.

== Early life and military ==
Boven was born in Kalamazoo, Michigan in 1925. He was the second of four sons born to Thomas Boven and Jessie Knapper. His parents were immigrants from the Netherlands, having come from Groningen. Boven was raised on the north side of Kalamazoo and attended Lincoln Junior High School. He then developed into a successful athlete at Kalamazoo Central High School where he lettered in football, baseball, and basketball. He graduated from Central in 1943 and, after his graduation, enlisted in the United States Army to serve in Europe during World War II. He was a Gunnery Sergeant with the American Third Army and arrived at Utah Beach on D-Day plus two. He also fought with the Third Army at the Battle of the Bulge. Following World War II, Boven returned to Kalamazoo where he enrolled at Western Michigan University with the help of the G.I. Bill to study for a degree in education.

== College career ==
Boven attended Western Michigan University from 1946 to 1949. He was an athletic standout while at Western and earned 11 varsity letters in football, basketball and baseball. In his final year at Western, he received the university's Academic-Athletic Excellence Honor Medal. On the basketball court at Western Michigan, Boven set the career scoring record with 1099 points between 1946 and 1949, though this record has since been broken. He is remembered as having successfully competed against players that were much taller than he was, such as Bowling Green's Don Otten. Boven also remains among the top ten for free throws made and free throws attempted. As a junior, Boven was named a second team All-American and in 1949, the senior was named a first team All-American. After college, Boven received offers to play professionally from the Cleveland Browns in football, the Chicago Cubs in baseball, and several professional basketball teams. He chose to play basketball and was selected by the Indianapolis Jets in the 6th round of the 1949 BAA draft.

== Professional career ==
=== Waterloo Hawks (1949–1951) ===
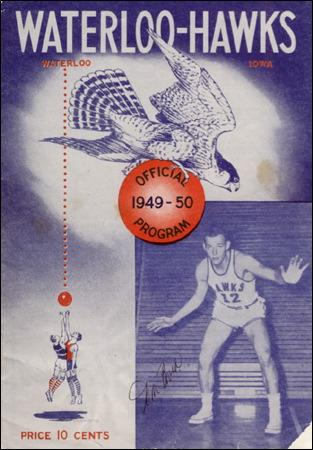
Don Boven shown on the lower right cover of the Waterloo Hawks' 1949–1950 program

Boven began his career playing for the Waterloo Hawks in 1949. During his college and professional playing days, he stood 6 ft 4 in (1.93 m), weighed 210 pounds (95 kg), and played most of his career as a small forward. The team finished fifth in the NBA Western Division with a 19–43 record. Boven averaged about 10 points and two assists per game and was in the top 20 in the league making 37% of his field goals. The following season, the Waterloo franchise left the NBA to join the original National Professional Basketball League during its only season in existence. Boven led the entire league in scoring with 781 points. He was also named a member of the league's all-star team. More than half of the league's teams folded over the course of the year and no championship game was played. Boven's Hawks and the Sheboygan Red Skins made claims to being the champions, but the league was dissolved before the matter could be resolved. Waterloo finished the season with the most wins of any team behind Boven's scoring, but Sheboygan defeated the Hawks in 8 of their fifteen meetings.

=== Milwaukee Hawks (1951–1953) ===
When the Waterloo franchise folded along with the NPBL, Boven was signed with the Milwaukee Hawks for one season. This team finished fifth in the NBA's western division and Boven put up numbers similar to his first year in the NBA. One lasting distinction came during that season. Boven was tied for third most personal fouls in the NBA behind George Mikan and Vern Mikkelsen. He also set a league record by fouling out of six consecutive games that season. Though this record was nearly broken in 1982 and skirted by Shaquille O'Neal in 2007, it still stands as of 2016.

=== Baltimore Bullets and Fort Wayne Pistons (1953) ===
For the 1952–53 season, Boven was traded to the Fort Wayne Pistons by way of the Baltimore Bullets. Though his stats were slightly lower than his previous seasons, the Pistons made it to the playoffs after finishing with a record of 36–33. Boven and the Pistons competed in the Western Division semifinals, beating the Rochester Royals two games to one. The Pistons then lost to George Mikan and the eventual NBA champion Minneapolis Lakers in the western division finals. This was Boven's last season in the NBA and he finished his professional career with averages of 10.2 points, 2.0 assists, and 4.2 rebounds per game.

== Coaching and later life ==
=== Western Michigan University ===
After retiring from professional basketball, Boven began a long career as a coach and instructor at Western Michigan University. He initially taught sports and physical education classes while serving as assistant coach for the football, basketball, and baseball teams. During the 1958–59 season, Boven was promoted to head coach of the Bronco's basketball team. Boven's first season was not very successful and the Broncos went 2–20. In 1959–60 Boven put together the first of two winning seasons (12–11). The other came in 1961–62 when the team went 13–11. Boven coached at Western Michigan until 1966 ending his coaching career with a record of 75–112 (.401). His record in the Mid-American conference was 36–60 (.375). His relatively poor winning percentage has been explained by the fact that he scheduled his team to play the best competition available in order to improve their skills on the court.

While he was working at Western, Boven also earned a Master of Arts degree in education from the university. He also played semi-professional baseball during the summer months for the Sutherland Paper Company team until the late 1950s. After his semi-professional career ended, Boven worked during the summers for the Kalamazoo Parks and Recreation Department as the director of the city's summer playground program. Boven was inducted into Western Michigan's hall of fame in 1975, at which time the school's athletic director noted "He commands respect with the history he represents in our university. He was an outstanding teacher and coach who continued to support Western."

=== Retirement and personal life ===
Boven retired from Western Michigan University in 1985 after 32 years of working with the institution. After he had completed his professional basketball career, Boven married Charlotte Kniese on April 25, 1953, and the couple had three children. The two had met while both were students at Western Michigan University. The family lived on a small lake near Mattawan, Michigan. He served as Texas Township Clerk for 12 years and was very active in his retirement. He was also a member of the National Basketball Retired Players Association. Charlotte Boven died in June 2010 and Donald died as a result of amyloidosis in his heart on March 10, 2011.

== Career statistics ==
Legend
GP	Games played	GS	Games started	MPG	Minutes per game
FG%	Field goal percentage	3P%	3-point field goal percentage	FT%	Free throw percentage
RPG	Rebounds per game	APG	Assists per game	SPG	Steals per game
BPG	Blocks per game	PPG	Points per game	**Bold**	Career high
*	Led the league

=== NBA ===
==== Regular season ====
Year	Team	GP	MPG	FG%	FT%	RPG	APG	PPG
1949–50	Waterloo	62	–	.373	.688	–	2.2	**10.6**
1951–52	Milwaukee	**66***	**30.0**	.299	.731	**5.1**	**2.7**	9.9
1952–53	Milwaukee	27	24.7	**.397**	.626	3.6	1.3	8.9
1952–53	Baltimore	23	14.3	.309	**.780**	2.7	1.0	4.6
1952–53	Fort Wayne	17	22.2	.324	.744	3.4	1.2	6.1
Career		195	25.2	.339	.706	4.2	2.0	9.0

==== Playoffs ====
Year	Team	GP	MPG	FG%	FT%	RPG	APG	PPG
1953	Fort Wayne	8	13.9	.250	.563	2.0	.3	2.9
